= Guilherme Oliveira (racing driver) =

Portuguese racing driver (born 2005)

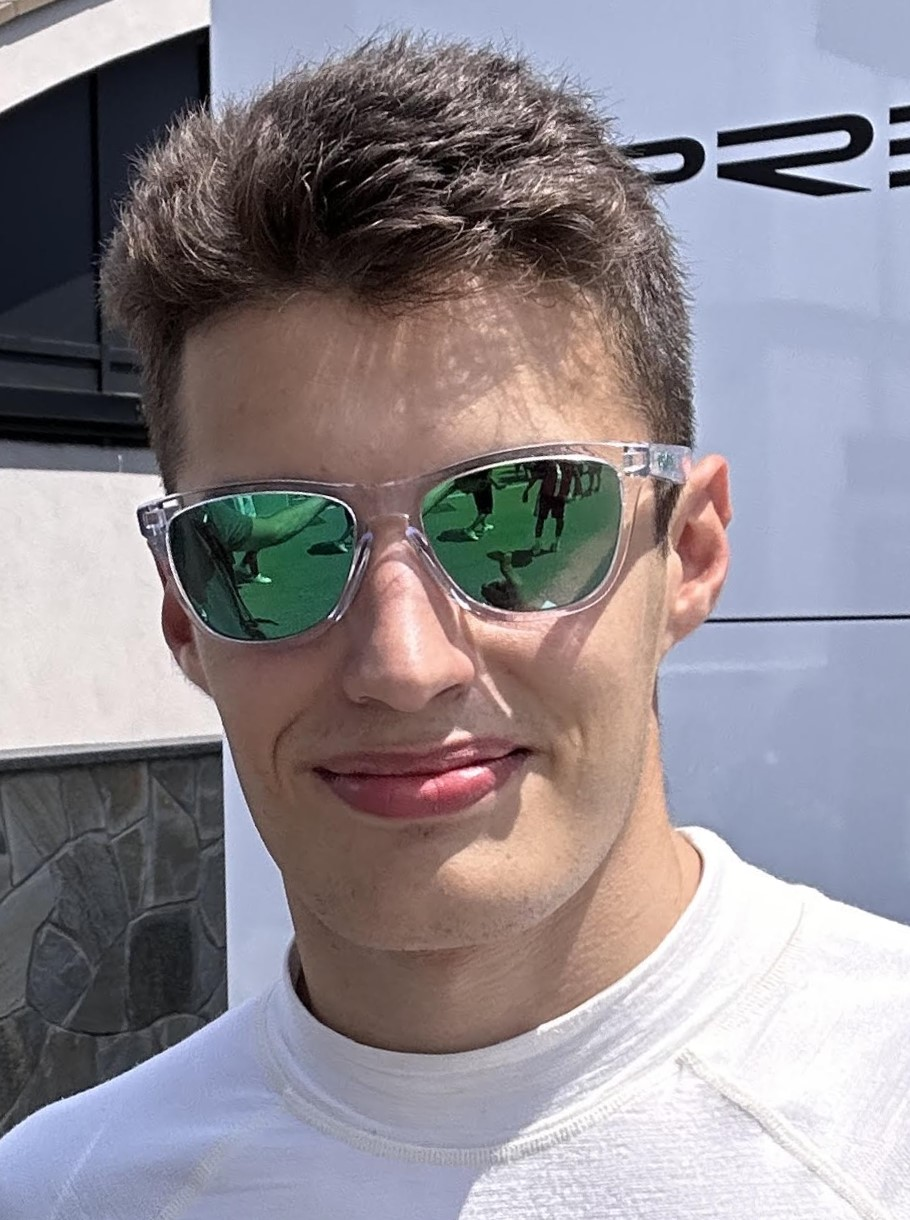
- Oliveira in 2023
- Nationality: (Portugal) Portuguese
- Born: Guilherme Moura de Oliveira; 7 January 2005 (age 21) Vila Nova de Gaia, Portugal

European Le Mans Series career
- Debut season: 2021
- Current team: Inter Europol Competition
- Categorisation: FIA Silver
- Car number: 13
- Former teams: Racing Experience
- Starts: 7 (7 entries)
- Wins: 3
- Podiums: 3
- Poles: 0
- Fastest laps: 0
- Best finish: 2nd (LMP3) in 2022

Previous series
- 2022 2020-2021: Asian Le Mans Series; F4 Spanish Championship

Guilherme Moura de Oliveira (born 7 January 2005) is a Portuguese racing driver currently competing in the GT World Challenge Europe Endurance Cup with Garage 59.

== Early career ==
=== Lower formulae ===
Near the end of 2020, Oliveira made his car racing debut, competing in the penultimate round of the F4 Spanish Championship with Drivex. He finished all three races in the top ten, with a best result of fourth in Race 2, but was unable to score points due to his status as a guest driver

Oliveira returned to Spanish F4 the following year, once again racing for Drivex alongside Maksim Arkhangelskiy, Branden Lee Oxley, Noam Abramczyk and Lola Lovinfosse. After a disappointing opening round in Spa-Francorchamps, he took his first points in Navarra. Having withdrawn from his home round at Portimão due to the COVID-19 pandemic, Oliveira bounced back by scoring his maiden podium in Race 3 at Aragón, after defending successfully from eventual champion Dilano van 't Hoff. He ended his season with a pair of points finishes at Jerez and Barcelona respectively, which left him 13th in the drivers' standings.

== Sportscar career ==
=== 2021: Endurance debut ===
In October 2021, Oliveira competed with Racing Experience in the season finale of the European Le Mans Series, driving in the LMP3 category.

=== 2022: ELMS title challenge ===
At the start of the following year, it was announced that Oliveira would be teaming up with Inter Europol Competition for the four-round long Asian Le Mans Series. Despite the team's struggles, exemplified by their failure to score a single podium during the campaign, Oliveira remained with Inter Europol for the European Le Mans Series, partnering Charles Crews and Nico Pino. Their season started out with a second place at Le Castellet, however the outfit would be disqualified from the results, after the Belleville washers in the differential of the car were found to not have complied with the championship's regulations during post-race scrutineering. The team struggled at Imola, having to settle for an eighth-placed finish after an early collision with a GTE car, but Oliveira and his teammates would score their first victory of the season in Monza, where he took the lead during the final stint, crossing the line for his maiden win in car racing. The positive momentum continued as the squad won again at Barcelona, with Oliveira managing to build up enough of a gap on his rivals to make up for a ten-second time penalty. Oliveira, Pino and Crews capped off their winning streak at Spa, dominating the race and winning with a margin of 41 seconds, which put the team first in the championship going into the season finale in Portimão. However, a collision between Pino and the LMP2 car of Mathias Beche put Inter Europol on the back foot, with their title assault eventually ending mere laps before the finish when Oliveira hit the No. 95 TF Sport Aston Martin after exiting the pitlane, as the steering of Oliveira's car seized. The team finished second in the standings, seven points behind the No. 17 Cool Racing car.

=== 2023 ===
Oliveira began his 2023 season by competing in the 24 Hours of Daytona with MRS GT-Racing in the LMP3 class, partnering Sebastián Álvarez, Danial Frost and Alex Vogel.

== Karting record ==
=== Karting career summary ===
Season	Series	Team	Position
2015	Taça de Portugal de Karting — Juvenis		3rd
2017	Campeonato Nacional de Karting — Junior		1st
2018	Rotax Max Challenge Grand Finals — Junior	Paulo de Oliveira	30th
2020	IAME Winter Cup — X30 Senior		11th

== Racing record ==
=== Racing career summary ===
Season	Series	Team	Races	Wins	Poles	F/Laps	Podiums	Points	Position
2020	F4 Spanish Championship	Drivex School	3	0	0	0	0	0	NC†
2021	F4 Spanish Championship	Drivex School	18	0	0	1	1	48	13th
2021	European Le Mans Series - LMP3	Racing Experience	1	0	0	0	0	0.5	38th
2022	Asian Le Mans Series - LMP3	Inter Europol Competition	4	0	0	0	0	38	7th
2022	European Le Mans Series - LMP3	Inter Europol Competition	6	3	0	0	3	79	**2nd**
2023	FIA World Endurance Championship - GTE Am	Project 1 – AO	2	0	0	0	0	12	23rd
2023	Le Mans Cup - LMP3	M Racing	3	0	0	0	1	18	12th
2023	IMSA SportsCar Championship - LMP3	MRS GT-Racing	1	0	0	0	0	315	28th
2023	IMSA SportsCar Championship - LMP3	Jr III Motorsports	1	0	0	0	0	315	28th
2023	Prototype Cup Germany	MRS-GT Racing	2	0	0	0	1	26	20th
2024	GT World Challenge Europe Endurance Cup	Dinamic GT	4	0	0	0	0	0	NC
2024	European Le Mans Series - LMP3	DKR Engineering	2	0	0	0	0	10	17th
2025	GT World Challenge Europe Endurance Cup	Garage 59	5	0	0	0	0	0	NC
2025	ADAC GT Masters	Dörr Motorsport	2	1	0	0	2	0	NC†
2026	Nürburgring Langstrecken-Serie - VT2-RWD	Manheller Racing							
2026	Nürburgring Langstrecken-Serie - SP10	PROsport-Racing							
2026	GT World Challenge Europe Endurance Cup	Optimum Motorsport	5	0	0	0	0	0	NC
2026	GT World Challenge Europe Sprint Cup	Optimum Motorsport	10	0	0	0	0	0	NC

^{†} As Oliveira was a guest driver, he was ineligible to score points.
^{*} Season still in progress.

=== Complete F4 Spanish Championship results ===
(key) (Races in bold indicate pole position) (Races in italics indicate fastest lap)

Year	Team	1	2	3	4	5	6	7	8	9	10	11	12	13	14	15	16	17	18	19	20	21	DC	Points
2020	Drivex School	NAV; 1	NAV; 2	NAV; 3	LEC; 1	LEC; 2	LEC; 3	JER; 1	JER; 2	JER; 3	CRT; 1	CRT; 2	CRT; 3	ARA; 1	ARA; 2	ARA; 3	JAR; 1; 7	JAR; 2; 4	JAR; 3; 9	CAT; 1	CAT; 2	CAT; 3	NC†	0
2021	Drivex School	SPA; 1 Ret	SPA; 2; 22	SPA; 3; 20	NAV; 1; 8	NAV; 2; 9	NAV; 3; 20	ALG; 1 WD	ALG; 2 WD	ALG; 3 WD	ARA; 1; 4	ARA; 2; 10	ARA; 3; 3	CRT; 1; 22	CRT; 2; 16	CRT; 3; 16	JER; 1 Ret	JER; 2; 6	JER; 3; 9	CAT; 1; 13	CAT; 2; 6	CAT; 3; 7	13th	48

=== Complete European Le Mans Series results ===
(key) (Races in bold indicate pole position; results in italics indicate fastest lap)

Year	Entrant	Class	Chassis	Engine	1	2	3	4	5	6	Rank	Points
2021	Racing Experience	LMP3	Duqueine M30 – D-08	Nissan VK56DE 5.6L V8	CAT	RBR	LEC	MNZ	SPA	ALG; 13	38th	0.5
2022	Inter Europol Competition	LMP3	Ligier JS P320	Nissan VK56DE 5.6L V8	LEC; DSQ	IMO; 8	MNZ; 1	CAT; 1	SPA; 1	ALG; Ret	2nd	79
2024	DKR Engineering	LMP3	Duqueine M30 – D-08	Nissan VK56DE 5.6L V8	CAT	LEC	IMO	SPA	MUG; Ret	ALG; 5	17th	10

=== Complete WeatherTech SportsCar Championship results ===
(key) (Races in bold indicate pole position; results in italics indicate fastest lap)

Year	Team	Class	Make	Engine	1	2	3	4	5	6	7	Pos.	Points
2023	MRS GT-Racing	LMP3	Ligier JS P320	Nissan VK56DE 5.6 L V8	DAY; 8	SEB	WGL	MOS	ELK			28th	315
2023	Jr III Motorsports	LMP3	Ligier JS P320	Nissan VK56DE 5.6 L V8						IMS; 4	PET	28th	315

=== Complete FIA World Endurance Championship results ===
(key) (Races in bold indicate pole position; results in italics indicate fastest lap)

Year	Entrant	Class	Car	Engine	1	2	3	4	5	6	7	Pos.	Points
2023	Project 1 – AO	LMGTE Am	Porsche 911 RSR-19	Porsche M97/80 4.2 L Flat-6	SEB	PRT; 6	SPA	LMS	MNZ; 8	FUJ	BHR	23th	12

=== Complete GT World Challenge Europe results ===
==== GT World Challenge Europe Endurance Cup ====
(key) (Races in bold indicate pole position; results in italics indicate fastest lap)

Year	Team	Car	Class	1	2	3	4	5	6	7	Pos.	Points
2024	Dinamic GT	Porsche 911 GT3 R (992)	Bronze	LEC; 35	SPA; 6H; Ret	SPA; 12H; Ret	SPA; 24H; Ret				NC	0
2024	Dinamic GT	Porsche 911 GT3 R (992)	Silver					NÜR; 27	MNZ; 28	JED	19th	27
2025	Garage 59	McLaren 720S GT3 Evo	Bronze	**LEC**; 54	**MNZ**; 17	SPA; 6H; 49	SPA; 12H; 22	SPA; 24H; 22			11th	34
2025	Garage 59	McLaren 720S GT3 Evo	Silver						**NÜR**; 18	**CAT**; 36	19th	21
2026	Optimum Motorsport	McLaren 720S GT3 Evo	Silver	LEC; Ret	MNZ; Ret	SPA; 6H; 30	SPA; 12H; 11	SPA; 24H; 17	NÜR; Ret	ALG; 19	7th	41

==== GT World Challenge Europe Sprint Cup ====
(key) (Races in bold indicate pole position; results in italics indicate fastest lap)

Year	Team	Car	Class	1	2	3	4	5	6	7	8	9	10	Pos.	Points
2026	Optimum Motorsport	McLaren 720S GT3 Evo	Silver	BRH; 1; 13	BRH; 2; 13	MIS; 1; 29	MIS; 2; 33	MAG; 1; 42	MAG; 2; 13	ZAN; 1; 25	ZAN; 2; 29	CAT; 1; 21	CAT; 2; 18	3rd	79.5
