= Francesco Braschi =

Italian racing driver (born 2004)

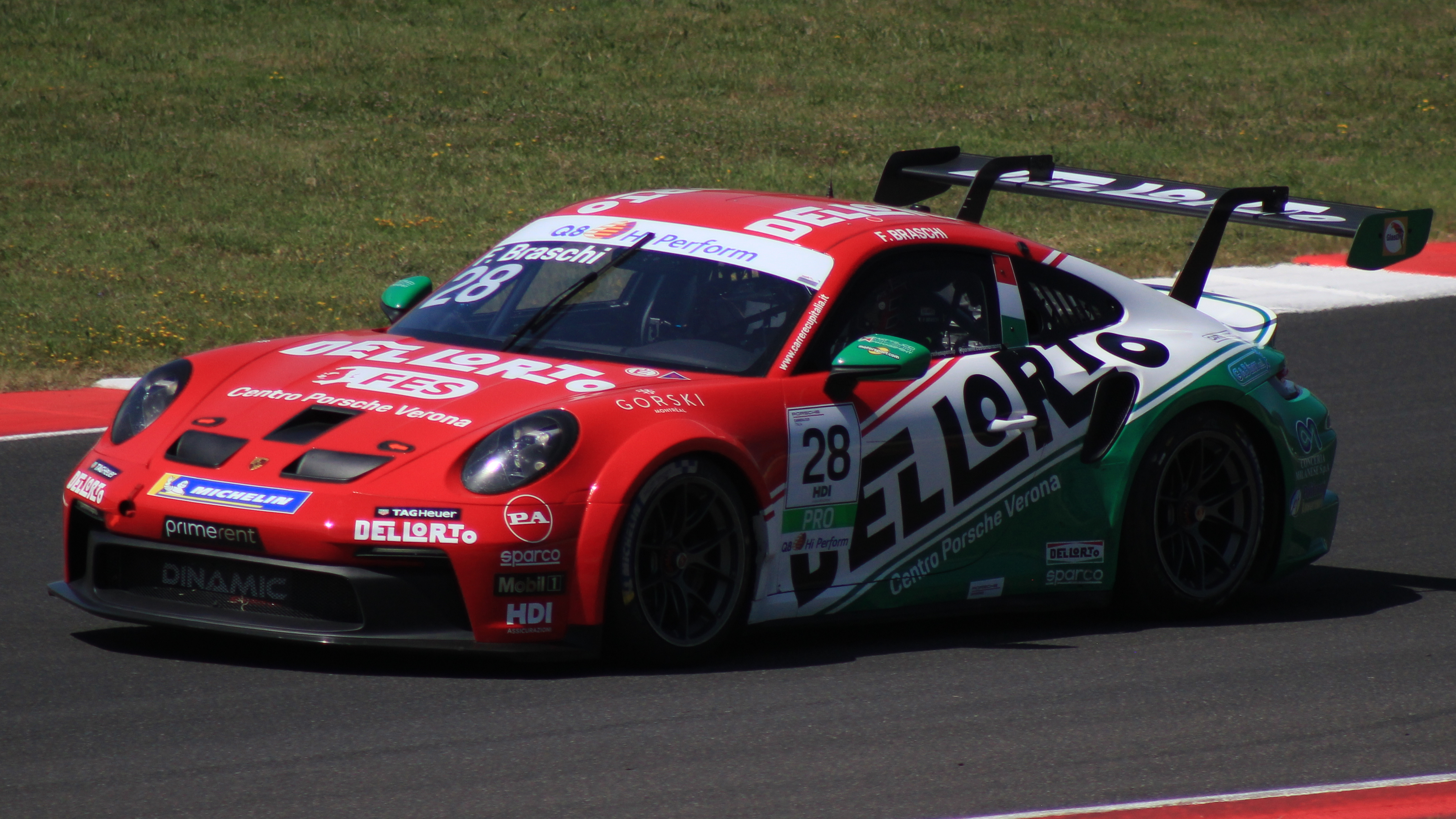
- Braschi racing at the Mugello Circuit during the 2024 Porsche Carrera Cup Italy.
- Nationality: (Italy) Italian
- Born: 27 November 2004 (age 21) Pesaro, Italy

Eurocup-3 career
- Debut season: 2023
- Current team: Campos Racing
- Categorisation: FIA Silver
- Car number: 28
- Starts: 16 (16 entries)
- Wins: 2
- Podiums: 6
- Poles: 1
- Fastest laps: 1
- Best finish: 5th in 2023

Previous series
- 2022 2022 2021, 2020 2021 2021 2021: FR European Championship; FR Asian Championship; Italian F4 Championship; ADAC Formula 4 F4 Spanish Championship; F4 UAE Championship

Francesco Braschi (born 27 November 2004) is an Italian racing driver who currently competes in the Porsche Supercup as well as the Porsche Carrera Cup Italia. He was previously active in single-seaters, winning two races in the inaugural Eurocup-3 season.

== Early career ==
=== Formula 4 ===
After several tests, Braschi made his car racing debut in the 2020 Italian F4 Championship with Jenzer Motorsport from round 4, partnering Santiago Ramos. He finished 35th in the standings. After driving in the F4 UAE series at the start of 2021, Braschi would remain at Jenzer in Italian F4, finishing 16th in the standings with a best race finish of fifth. He also competed in two rounds of ADAC F4 as a guest entrant and drove in the Spanish F4 season opener.

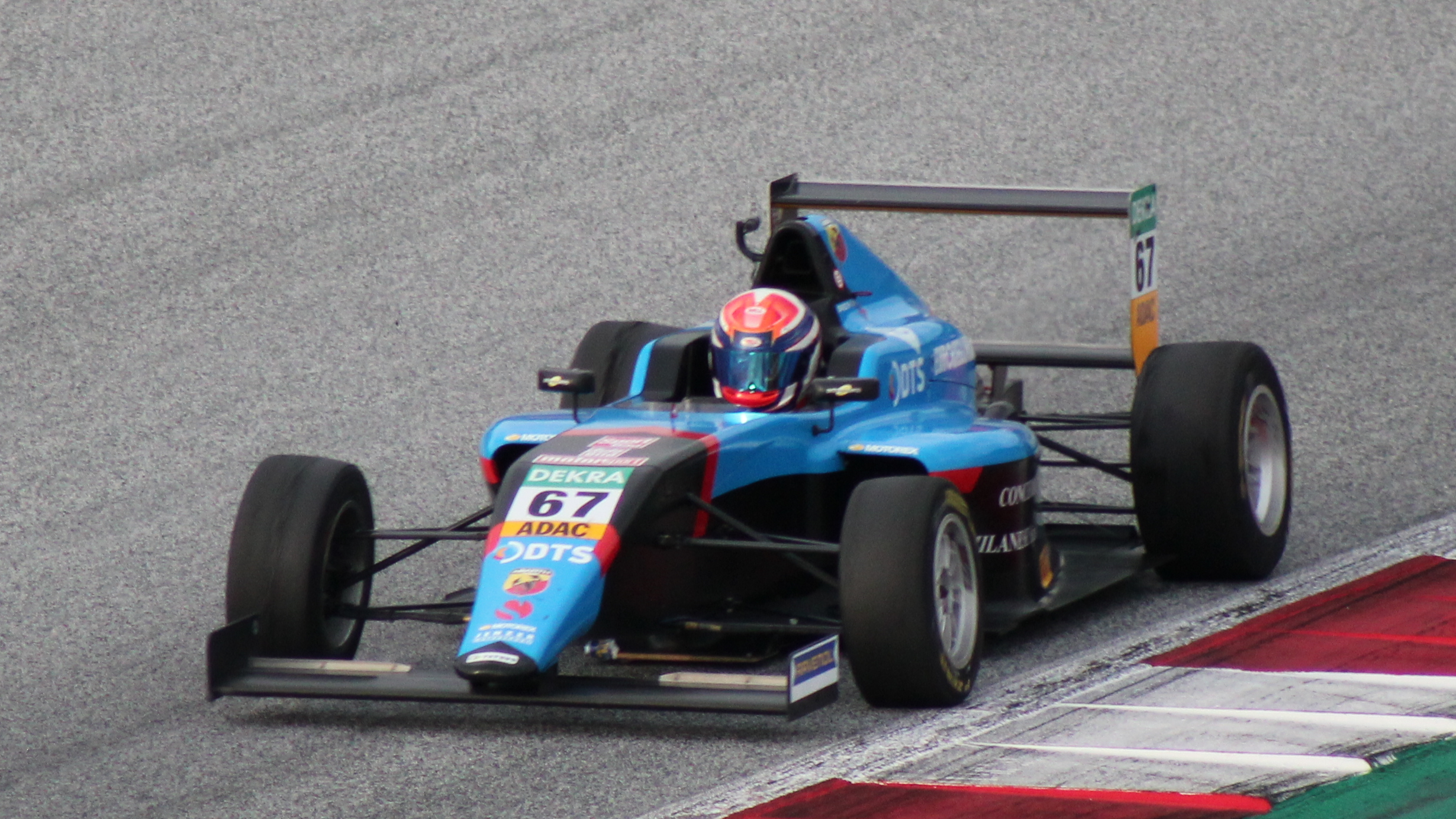
Braschi racing in the 2021 ADAC Formula 4 Championship.

=== Formula Regional & Eurocup-3 ===
Moving up to the Formula Regional category in 2022, Braschi would first drive in three rounds of the Formula Regional Asian Championship with 3Y by R-ace GP. Thanks to two points finishes at Dubai Braschi ended up 22nd in the standings. Subsequently, Braschi joined KIC Motorsport at the start of the Formula Regional European season. However, he would leave the team after a scoreless first half of the campaign, moving to MP Motorsport for a round to replace the injured Dilano van 't Hoff. From the round at Spa onward Braschi would join FA Racing by MP, for whom he scored a lone point near the end of the year, thereby placing himself 26th overall.

After contesting the opening two events of the FRMEC championship in the winter of 2023, Braschi joined the newly-founded Eurocup-3 series with Campos Racing during the main season. He began the year well, scoring successive podiums in the first four races, including taking the first win in series history at Spa. He would fall behind teammate Esteban Masson and other title contenders soon after though, only taking one further victory at Jerez and a second place at Estoril to finish fifth in the standings.

== Sportscar career ==
=== Porsche Cup ===
Braschi made his sportscar debut in 2023, competing for Dinamic Motorsport in two rounds of the Porsche Carrera Cup Italy. Braschi would make the Porsche series his home in 2024, as he embarked on a double campaign in both the PCCI and the main Porsche Supercup, both of which he contested with Dinamic.

== Racing record ==
=== Racing career summary ===
Season	Series	Team	Races	Wins	Poles	F/Laps	Podiums	Points	Position
2020	Italian F4 Championship	Jenzer Motorsport	10	0	0	0	0	0	35th
2021	Formula 4 UAE Championship	BWT Mücke Motorsport	8	0	0	0	2	77	8th
2021	Italian F4 Championship	Jenzer Motorsport	20	0	0	1	0	27	16th
2021	ADAC Formula 4 Championship	Jenzer Motorsport	6	0	0	0	0	0	NC†
2021	F4 Spanish Championship	Jenzer Motorsport	3	0	0	0	0	4	21st
2021	FIA Central European Zone Formula 4	Jenzer Motorsport	2	0	?	?	1	28	5th
2022	Formula Regional Asian Championship	3Y by R-ace GP	9	0	0	0	0	3	22nd
2022	Formula Regional European Championship	KIC Motorsport	9	0	0	0	0	1	26th
2022	Formula Regional European Championship	MP Motorsport	2	0	0	0	0	1	26th
2022	Formula Regional European Championship	FA Racing by MP	8	0	0	0	0	1	26th
2023	Formula Regional Middle East Championship	R-ace GP	6	0	0	0	0	6	27th
2023	Eurocup-3	Campos Racing	16	2	1	1	6	156	5th
2023	Porsche Carrera Cup Italy	Dinamic Motorsport	3	0	0	0	0	0	36th
2024	Porsche Supercup	Dinamic Motorsport	7	0	0	0	0	15	17th
2024	Porsche Carrera Cup Italy	Dinamic Motorsport	12	0	0	0	2	89	8th
2024	Porsche Carrera Cup France	Martinet/Forestier Racing	2	0	0	0	0	0	NC†
2025	Porsche Carrera Cup Italy	Ombra Racing	12	2	2	0	3	122	4th
2025	Porsche Supercup	Ombra Racing	8	0	0	1	0	13	18th
2026	Italian GT Championship Endurance Cup - GT3	Spirit of Race	4	0	0	0	1	27	8th
2026	Italian GT Championship Sprint Cup - GT3	Spirit of Race	8	0	1	1	0	36	7th
2026	GT World Challenge Europe Endurance Cup	AF Corse	1	0	0	0	0	0	NC

^{†} As Braschi was a guest driver, he was ineligible for championship points.
* Season still in progress.

=== Complete Italian F4 Championship results ===
(key) (Races in bold indicate pole position) (Races in italics indicate fastest lap)

Year	Team	1	2	3	4	5	6	7	8	9	10	11	12	13	14	15	16	17	18	19	20	21	Pos	Points
2020	Jenzer Motorsport	MIS; 1	MIS; 2	MIS; 3	IMO1; 1	IMO1; 2	IMO1; 3	RBR; 1	RBR; 2	RBR; 3	MUG; 1; 14	MUG; 2 Ret	MUG; 3; 16	MNZ; 1 DNS	MNZ; 2; 16	MNZ; 3; 14	IMO2; 1; 31†	IMO2; 2 Ret	IMO2; 3 NC	VLL; 1; 16	VLL; 2 C	VLL; 3; 32	35th	0
2021	Jenzer Motorsport	LEC; 1; 20	LEC; 2 Ret	LEC; 3; 16	MIS; 1; 17	MIS; 2; 17	MIS; 3; 13	VLL; 1; 24	VLL; 2 Ret	VLL; 3 Ret	IMO; 1; 24†	IMO; 2 Ret	IMO; 3; 5	RBR; 1; 10	RBR; 2; 6	RBR; 3 Ret	MUG; 1; 11	MUG; 2 Ret	MUG; 3; 6	MNZ; 1; 25	MNZ; 2; 31†	MNZ; 3 WD	16th	27

=== Complete Formula 4 UAE Championship results ===
(key) (Races in bold indicate pole position) (Races in italics indicate fastest lap)

Year	Team	1	2	3	4	5	6	7	8	9	10	11	12	13	14	15	16	17	18	19	20	Pos	Points
2021	BWT Mücke Motorsport	DUB1; 1; 5	DUB1; 2; 2	DUB1; 3; 5	DUB1; 4; 7	YMC1; 1	YMC1; 2	YMC1; 3	YMC1; 4	DUB2; 1; 11	DUB2; 2; 6	DUB2; 3; 7	DUB2; 4; 2	YMC2; 1	YMC2; 2	YMC2; 3	YMC2; 4	DUB3; 1	DUB3; 2	DUB3; 3	DUB3; 4	8th	77

=== Complete F4 Spanish Championship results ===
(key) (Races in bold indicate pole position) (Races in italics indicate fastest lap)

Year	Team	1	2	3	4	5	6	7	8	9	10	11	12	13	14	15	16	17	18	19	20	21	Pos	Points
2021	Jenzer Motorsport	SPA; 1; 8	SPA; 2; 19	SPA; 3; 23	NAV; 1	NAV; 2	NAV; 3	ALG; 1	ALG; 2	ALG; 3	ARA; 1	ARA; 2	ARA; 3	CRT; 1	CRT; 2	CRT; 3	JER; 1	JER; 2	JER; 3	CAT; 1	CAT; 2	CAT; 3	28th	0

=== Complete ADAC Formula 4 Championship results ===
(key) (Races in bold indicate pole position) (Races in italics indicate fastest lap)

Year	Team	1	2	3	4	5	6	7	8	9	10	11	12	13	14	15	16	17	18	Pos	Points
2021	Jenzer Motorsport	RBR; 1; 20	RBR; 2; 10	RBR; 3; 14	ZAN; 1; 10	ZAN; 2 Ret	ZAN; 3 Ret	HOC1; 1	HOC1; 2	HOC1; 3	SAC; 1	SAC; 2	SAC; 3	HOC2; 1	HOC2; 2	HOC2; 3	NÜR; 1	NÜR; 2	NÜR; 3	NC	–

† As Braschi was a guest driver, he was ineligible for points

=== Complete Formula Regional Asian/Middle East Championship results ===
(key) (Races in bold indicate pole position) (Races in italics indicate fastest lap)

Year	Entrant	1	2	3	4	5	6	7	8	9	10	11	12	13	14	15	DC	Points
2022	3Y by R-ace GP	ABU1; 1	ABU1; 2	ABU1; 3	DUB1; 1	DUB1; 2	DUB1; 3	DUB2; 1 Ret	DUB2; 2; 15	DUB2; 3; 14	DUB3; 1; 10	DUB3; 2; 19	DUB3; 3; 9	ABU2; 1; 11	ABU2; 2; 23	ABU2; 3; 19	22nd	3
2023	R-ace GP	DUB1; 1; 13	DUB1; 2; 7	DUB1; 3; 16	KUW1; 1 Ret	KUW1; 2; 15	KUW1; 3; 18	KUW2; 1	KUW2; 2	KUW2; 3	DUB2; 1	DUB2; 2	DUB2; 3	ABU; 1	ABU; 2	ABU; 3	27th	6

=== Complete Formula Regional European Championship results ===
(key) (Races in bold indicate pole position) (Races in italics indicate fastest lap)

Year	Team	1	2	3	4	5	6	7	8	9	10	11	12	13	14	15	16	17	18	19	20	DC	Points
2022	KIC Motorsport	MNZ; 1; 29	MNZ; 2; 30	IMO; 1; 27	IMO; 2; 24	MCO; 1; 24	MCO; 2 DNQ	LEC; 1; 24	LEC; 2; 17	ZAN; 1; 26	ZAN; 2; 23											26th	1
2022	MP Motorsport											HUN; 1; 23	HUN; 2; 23									26th	1
2022	FA Racing by MP													SPA; 1; 23	SPA; 2; 23	RBR; 1; 18	RBR; 2; 27	CAT; 1; 26	CAT; 2; 11	MUG; 1 Ret	MUG; 2 Ret	26th	1

* Season still in progress.

=== Complete Eurocup-3 results ===
(key) (Races in bold indicate pole position) (Races in italics indicate fastest lap)

Year	Team	1	2	3	4	5	6	7	8	9	10	11	12	13	14	15	16	DC	Points
2023	Campos Racing	SPA; 1; 1	SPA; 2; 2	ARA; 1; 3	ARA; 2; 2	MNZ; 1; 11	**MNZ**; **2**; 8	ZAN; 1 Ret	ZAN; 2; 7	JER; 1; 1	JER; 2 Ret	EST; 1; 2	EST; 2; 7	CRT; 1; 12	CRT; 2; 7	CAT; 1; 5	CAT; 2; 9	5th	156

=== Complete Porsche Carrera Cup Italia results ===
(key) (Races in bold indicate pole position) (Races in italics indicate fastest lap)

Year	Team	1	2	3	4	5	6	7	8	9	10	11	12	Pos	Points
2023	Dinamic Motorsport	MIS1; 1	MIS1; 2	VLL; 1	VLL; 2	MUG; 1	MUG; 2	MNZ; 1	MNZ; 2	MIS2; 1; 16	MIS2; 2; 17	IMO; 1 Ret	IMO; 2 DNS	36th	0
2024	Dinamic Motorsport	MIS; 1; 3	MIS; 2; 4	IMO1; 1; 4	IMO1; 2; 12	MUG; 1; 15	MUG; 2; 18	IMO2; 1; 29	IMO2; 2; 2	VLL; 1; 9	VLL; 2; 7	MNZ; 1; 13	MNZ; 2 Ret	8th	89

^{*}Season still in progress.

=== Complete Porsche Supercup results ===
(key) (Races in bold indicate pole position) (Races in italics indicate fastest lap)

Year	Team	1	2	3	4	5	6	7	8	Pos.	Points
2024	Dinamic Motorsport SRL	IMO; 16	MON; 16	RBR; 11	SIL; 26	HUN	SPA; 16	ZAN; Ret	MNZ; 10	15th	16
2025	Ombra S.R.L.	IMO; Ret	MON; 10‡	CAT; 19	RBR; 27	SPA; 20	HUN; 8	ZAN; 22	MNZ; 15	18th	13

^{‡} Half points awarded as less than 75% of race distance was completed.
^{*} Season still in progress.
