= Rik Koen =

Dutch racing driver (born 2004)

- Nationality: (Netherlands) Dutch
- Born: 5 May 2004 (age 22) Arnhem, Netherlands

European Le Mans Series career
- Debut season: 2025
- Current team: Rossa Racing by Virage
- Categorisation: FIA Silver
- Starts: 6
- Wins: 1
- Podiums: 2
- Poles: 0
- Fastest laps: 0
- Best finish: 2nd in 2025 (LMP3)

Previous series
- 2024–2025 2024 2022–2023 2021–2022 2021 2019–2020: Le Mans Cup; Prototype Winter Series; Porsche Carrera Cup Benelux; Formula 4 UAE Championship; F4 Spanish Championship; Ford Fiesta Sprint Cup Belgium

Rik Koen (born 5 May 2004) is a Dutch racing driver who currently competes in the European Le Mans Series for Rossa Racing by Virage in the LMP2 Pro-Am class.

== Sportscar racing career ==
=== Prototype Winter Series ===
Following two years competing in the Porsche Carrera Cup Benelux series, Koen transitioned to prototypes. He signed with Inter Europol Competition to compete in final round of the 2024 Prototype Winter Series. Race one of the final round at Barcelona was cancelled, so Koen only partook in race two. He impressed on his debut, finishing on the podium in third.

=== Le Mans Cup ===
==== 2024 ====
For 2024, Koen committed to a full season in the Le Mans Cup, driving in the LMP3 class for Inter Europol Competition. On his debut in the series, he finished in third alongside his teammate Alexander Bukhantsov.

==== 2025 ====
Midway through the 2025 Le Mans Cup, Koen participated in the third round at Le Mans driving for Team Virage. He had a best result of sixth between the two races.

=== European Le Mans Series ===
==== 2025 ====
In 2025, Koen moved up to the European Le Mans Series, driving the full season in the LMP3 class for Team Virage. At the 4 Hours of Spa-Francorchamps, he won his first race in the series alongside teammates and his teammates Daniel Nogales and Julien Gerbi. He secured another podium for the team at the 4 Hours of Portimão finishing second.

==== 2026 ====
Koen returned for the 2026 European Le Mans Series, signing with Rossa Racing by Virage, and moving up to the LMP2 Pro-Am class to drive with John Falb and Manuel Espírito Santo.

== Karting record ==
=== Karting career summary ===
Season	Series	Team	Position
2012	Dutch 4-Stroke Sprint Championship – Cadet 160		12th
2012	GK4 Four-Stroke Kart Series – Honda Cadet		11th
2013	Winter Gold Cup – Cadet 160		11th
2016	RMC Grand Finals – Mini Max		18th

== Racing record ==
=== Racing career summary ===
Season	Series	Team	Races	Wins	Poles	F/Laps	Podiums	Points	Position
2019	Ford Fiesta Sprint Cup Belgium		?	?	?	?	?	0	NC
2020	Ford Fiesta Sprint Cup Belgium		?	?	?	?	?	?	**3rd**
2021	F4 Spanish Championship	MP Motorsport	21	0	1	4	3	121	6th
2021	Formula 4 UAE Championship – Trophy Round	MP Motorsport	1	0	0	0	0	N/A	DSQ
2022	Formula 4 UAE Championship	MP Motorsport	8	0	0	0	0	22	18th
2022	Porsche Carrera Cup Benelux	Parker Revs Motorsport	6	0	0	0	2	77	7th
2023	Porsche Carrera Cup Benelux	Revs Motorsport	10	0	0	0	1	53	12th
2024	Prototype Winter Series – LMP3	Inter Europol Competition	1	0	0	0	1	6.43	17th
2024	Le Mans Cup – LMP3	Inter Europol Competition	6	0	1	1	0	21	11th
2025	European Le Mans Series – LMP3	Team Virage	6	1	0	0	2	69	**2nd**
2025	Le Mans Cup – LMP3	Team Virage	2	0	0	0	0	0	NC†
2026	European Le Mans Series – LMP2 Pro-Am	Rossa Racing by Virage	6	0	0	0	1	59	6th

* Season still in progress.
† As Koen was a guest driver, he was ineligible for points

=== Complete F4 Spanish Championship results ===
(key) (Races in bold indicate pole position) (Races in italics indicate fastest lap)

Year	Team	1	2	3	4	5	6	7	8	9	10	11	12	13	14	15	16	17	18	19	20	21	DC	Points
2021	MP Motorsport	SPA; 1; 16	SPA; 2; 11	SPA; 3; 4	NAV; 1; 6	NAV; 2; 13	NAV; 3; 18	ALG; 1 Ret	ALG; 2; 7	ALG; 3; 3	ARA; 1; 6	ARA; 2 Ret	ARA; 3; 6	CRT; 1; 9	CRT; 2; 3	CRT; 3; 5	JER; 1; 6	JER; 2; 10	JER; 3; 5	CAT; 1; 4	**CAT**; **2**; 2	CAT; 3; 18	6th	121

=== Complete Formula 4 UAE Championship results ===
(key) (Races in bold indicate pole position) (Races in italics indicate fastest lap)

Year	Team	1	2	3	4	5	6	7	8	9	10	11	12	13	14	15	16	17	18	19	20	DC	Points
2022	MP Motorsport	YAS1; 1; 5	YAS1; 2; 11	YAS1; 3; 8	YAS1; 4; 7	DUB1; 1; 12	DUB1; 2; 10	DUB1; 3; 10	DUB1; 4; 13	DUB2; 1	DUB2; 2	DUB2; 3	DUB2; 4	DUB3; 1	DUB3; 2	DUB3; 3	DUB3; 4	YAS2; 1	YAS2; 2	YAS2; 3	YAS2; 4	18th	22

=== Complete Le Mans Cup results ===
(key) (Races in bold indicate pole position; results in italics indicate fastest lap)

Year	Entrant	Class	Chassis	1	2	3	4	5	6	7	Rank	Points
2024	Inter Europol Competition	LMP3	Ligier JS P320	CAT; 3	LEC; 8	LMS; 1 Ret	LMS; 2; 11	SPA; Ret	MUG; 9	ALG; 16	11th	21
2025	Team Virage	LMP3	Ligier JS P325	CAT	LEC	LMS; 1; 6	LMS; 2; 19	SPA	SIL	ALG	NC†	0

^{*} Season still in progress.

=== Complete European Le Mans Series results ===
(key) (Races in bold indicate pole position; results in italics indicate fastest lap)

Year	Entrant	Class	Chassis	Engine	1	2	3	4	5	6	Rank	Points
2025	Team Virage	LMP3	Ligier JS P325	Toyota V35A-FTS 3.5 L V6	CAT; 8	LEC; Ret	IMO; 5	SPA; 1	SIL; 4	ALG; 2	2nd	69
2026	Rossa Racing by Virage	LMP2 Pro-Am	Oreca 07	Gibson GK428 4.2 L V8	CAT; 5	LEC; 7	IMO; 4	SPA; 6	SIL; 3	ALG; 6	6th	59

^{*} Season still in progress.
