= Jonas Ried =

German racing driver (born 2004)

- Ried at Silverstone Circuit in 2026
- Nationality: (Germany) German
- Born: 18 December 2004 (age 21) Ehingen, Germany
- Relatives: Christian Ried (father); Lenny Ried (brother)

European Le Mans Series career
- Debut season: 2023
- Current team: Iron Lynx - Proton
- Categorisation: FIA Silver
- Car number: 9
- Co-driver: Matteo Cairoli, Macéo Capietto
- Starts: 15 (15 entries)
- Wins: 1
- Podiums: 1
- Poles: 2
- Fastest laps: 0
- Best finish: 8th in 2024

Previous series
- 2023 2022 2021–2022 2021–2022: Asian Le Mans Series; ADAC Formula 4 Italian F4 Championship; Formula 4 UAE Championship

Jonas Ried (born 18 December 2004) is a German racing driver currently competing in the European Le Mans Series for Proton Competition.

Ried is the son of FIA World Endurance Championship driver and Proton Competition team owner Christian Ried.

== Early career ==
=== Karting ===
Having finished second in the Bavarian-based Kart Trophy Weiß-Blau in 2014, Ried began karting at a national level the following year, taking part in the ADAC Kart Masters in the Bambini class. Parallel to that, he would also compete in the South German ADAC Kart Cup, finishing third in 2016, while also becoming runner-up in the ADAC Kart Bundesendlauf during his first year of OK Junior karting in 2017. Ried would remain in karting until 2020, where he made a first foray into gearbox karts.

=== Lower formulae ===
==== 2021 ====
Ried progressed into single-seaters in 2021, racing for BWT Mücke Motorsport in the Formula 4 UAE Championship at the start of the year. There he would take his first podiums in car racing, one at Yas Island and Dubai respectively, and finished ninth in the standings.

That season, Ried would compete full-time in the Italian F4 Championship with the same team, partnering Joshua Dürksen and Erick Zúñiga. His best finish came during Race 1 in Misano, where he also took the fastest lap, and another points finish the race before at Le Castellet meant that Ried ended up 23rd overall.

==== 2022 ====
Having begun the 2022 season by racing in the F4 UAE Championship during the winter, Ried teamed up with Taylor Barnard and Niktia Bedrin for a season in Italian and ADAC F4 with new team PHM Racing. Ried would experience a challenging campaign in the former, managing to score points on just one occasion in Monza, whereas the season in Germany proved to bear more fruit, with Ried taking points in all but four races, which meant he took ninth in the drivers' standings.

== Sportscar career ==
In 2023, Ried would make a switch to endurance racing, first driving for Rinaldi Racing in the LMP3 class of the Asian Le Mans Series, before joining his father's team, Proton Competition, for a season in the European Le Mans Series as part of the LMP2 category. The campaign in Asia started off promisingly, as Ried, Matthias Lüthen and Lorcan Hanafin finished Race 1 at Dubai in fourth place, however three subsequent, successive retirements caused by reliability issues and a collision in the final race meant that the trio ended up twelfth in the drivers' standings.

At the start of June 2023, it was announced that Ried would partner Harry Tincknell and Donald Yount at Proton in the LMGTE Am category in the centenary edition of the 24 Hours of Le Mans. Ried would crash out of the race during the early stages of Sunday morning, losing control of his Porsche 911 RSR-19 under braking on the approach to Indianapolis. In the ELMS, Ried and Proton scored a best Pro-Am finish of fifth and ended up eighth in the teams' standings.

Having competed in the Asian Le Mans Series with ARC Bratislava during the winter, Ried entered the European Le Mans Series with Iron Lynx - Proton to partner Matteo Cairoli and Macéo Capietto in the LMP2 Pro class.

== Karting record ==
=== Karting career summary ===
Season	Series	Team	Position
2014	Kart Trophy Weiß-Blau – Raket RT		**2nd**
2015	Süddeutscher ADAC Kart Cup – Bambini	AMC Ehingen	NC†
2015	ADAC Kart Masters – Bambini	Solgat Motorsport	29th
2016	Süddeutscher ADAC Kart Cup – Bambini	AMC Ehingen	**3rd**
2016	ADAC Kart Masters – Bambini	Solgat Motorsport	8th
2017	Süddeutscher ADAC Kart Cup – OKJ	Solgat Motorsport	NC†
2017	ADAC Kart Bundesendlauf – OKJ	Solgat Motorsport	**2nd**
2017	ADAC Kart Masters – OKJ	Solgat Motorsport	23rd
2018	Süddeutscher ADAC Kart Cup – OKJ	Solgat Motorsport	NC†
2018	ADAC Kart Masters – OKJ	Solgat Motorsport	5th
2018	WSK Champions Cup — OKJ	Solgat Motorsport	75th
2018	WSK Super Master Series — OKJ	Solgat Motorsport	NC†
2018	Andrea Margutti Trophy – OKJ	Solgat Motorsport	7th
2018	Deutsche Kart Meisterschaft — OKJ	Solgat Motorsport	28th
2018	CIK-FIA European Championship — OKJ	Solgat Motorsport	NC†
2018	WSK Final Cup — OKJ	Solgat Motorsport	NC†
2019	WSK Super Master Series — OK	Solgat Motorsport	NC†
2019	Andrea Margutti Trophy – OK	Solgat Motorsport	9th
2019	WSK Euro Series — OK	Solgat Motorsport	NC†
2019	Deutsche Kart Meisterschaft — OK	Solgat Motorsport	23rd
2020	ADAC Kart Masters – KZ2	Solgat Motorsport	12th
2020	DMSB-Schalt-Kart-Cup – KZ2	Solgat Motorsport	?

^{†} As Ried was a guest driver, he was ineligible to be classified in the standings.

=== Complete CIK-FIA Karting European Championship results ===
(key) (Races in bold indicate pole position) (Races in italics indicate fastest lap)

Year	Team	Class	1	2	3	4	5	6	7	8	DC	Points
2018	Solgat Motorsport	OKJ	SAR; QH	SAR; R	PFI; QH	PFI; R	AMP; QH; 46	AMP; R DNQ	ESS; QH	ESS; R	NC†	0

^{†} As Ried was a guest driver, he was ineligible to be classified in the standings.

== Racing record ==
=== Racing career summary ===
Season	Series	Team	Races	Wins	Poles	F/Laps	Podiums	Points	Position
2021	Formula 4 UAE Championship	BWT Mücke Motorsport	20	0	0	0	2	77	9th
2021	Italian F4 Championship	BWT Mücke Motorsport	21	0	0	1	0	13	25th
2022	Formula 4 UAE Championship	PHM Racing	20	0	0	0	0	4	23rd
2022	Italian F4 Championship	PHM Racing	20	0	0	0	0	1	25th
2022	ADAC Formula 4 Championship	PHM Racing	18	0	0	1	0	71	9th
2022	F4 Spanish Championship	Monlau Motorsport	3	0	0	0	0	0	NC†
2023	Asian Le Mans Series - LMP3	Rinaldi Racing	4	0	0	0	0	12	12nd
2023	European Le Mans Series - LMP2 Pro-Am	Proton Competition	6	0	0	0	0	33	11st
2023	FIA World Endurance Championship - GTE Am	Proton Competition	1	0	0	0	0	0	NC
2023	24 Hours of Le Mans - LMGTE Am	Proton Competition	1	0	0	0	0	N/A	DNF
2023-24	Asian Le Mans Series - LMP2	ARC Bratislava	5	0	0	0	0	7	14th
2024	European Le Mans Series - LMP2	Iron Lynx - Proton	6	1	1	0	1	36	8th
2024	24 Hours of Le Mans - LMP2	Proton Competition	1	0	0	0	0	N/A	DNF
2024-25	Asian Le Mans Series - LMP2	Proton Competition	6	0	0	0	0	26	10th
2025	European Le Mans Series - LMP2	Iron Lynx - Proton	6	0	1	1	0	35	9th
2025	24 Hours of Le Mans - LMP2	Iron Lynx - Proton	1	0	0	0	0	N/A	4th
2025-26	Asian Le Mans Series - LMP2	Proton Competition	6	0	0	0	0	0	18th
2026	European Le Mans Series - LMP2	Proton Competition	6	0	0	0	0	21	15th
2026	24 Hours of Le Mans - LMP2	Proton Competition	1	0	0	0	0	N/A	8th
2026-27	Asian Le Mans Series - GT3	Proton Competition							

^{*} Season still in progress.

=== Complete F4 UAE Championship results ===
(key) (Races in bold indicate pole position) (Races in italics indicate fastest lap)

Year	Team	1	2	3	4	5	6	7	8	9	10	11	12	13	14	15	16	17	18	19	20	Pos	Points
2021	BWT Mücke Motorsport	DUB1; 1; 9	DUB1; 2; 9	DUB1; 3; 12	DUB1; 4; 8	YMC1; 1 Ret	YMC1; 2; 10	YMC1; 3; 9	YMC1; 4; 10	DUB2; 1; 10	DUB2; 2; 10	DUB2; 3; 8	DUB2; 4; 9	YMC2; 1; 8	YMC2; 2; 8	YMC2; 3; 7	YMC2; 4; 3	DUB3; 1 Ret	DUB3; 2; 8	DUB3; 3; 7	DUB3; 4; 2	9th	77
2022	PHM Racing	YMC1; 1; 16	YMC1; 2; 13	YMC1; 3; 16	YMC1; 4; 19	DUB1; 1; 15	DUB1; 2; 14	DUB1; 3; 26	DUB1; 4; 11	DUB2; 1; 26	DUB2; 2; 17	DUB2; 3; 20	DUB2; 4; 19	DUB3; 1; 18	DUB3; 2; 13	DUB3; 3; 22	DUB3; 4; 19	YMC2; 1; 9	YMC2; 2; 24†	YMC2; 3; 9	YMC2; 4; 18	23rd	4

=== Complete Italian F4 Championship results ===
(key) (Races in bold indicate pole position) (Races in italics indicate fastest lap)

Year	Team	1	2	3	4	5	6	7	8	9	10	11	12	13	14	15	16	17	18	19	20	21	22	DC	Points
2021	BWT Mücke Motorsport	LEC; 1; 18	LEC; 2; 26	LEC; 3; 10	MIS; 1; 4	MIS; 2; 16	MIS; 3; 24	VLL; 1; 22	VLL; 2; 24	VLL; 3; 23	IMO; 1; 19	IMO; 2 Ret	IMO; 3; 23	RBR; 1; 26	RBR; 2 Ret	RBR; 3 Ret	MUG; 1; 22	MUG; 2; 27	MUG; 3; 20	MNZ; 1 Ret	MNZ; 2; 23	MNZ; 3; 16		25th	13
2022	PHM Racing	IMO; 1; 14	IMO; 2; 14	IMO; 3; 16	MIS; 1 Ret	MIS; 2; 32	MIS; 3 Ret	SPA; 1; 14	SPA; 2 Ret	SPA; 3; 33	VLL; 1 Ret	VLL; 2; 18	VLL; 3; 12	RBR; 1; 11	RBR; 2; 21	RBR; 3	RBR; 4 Ret	MNZ; 1; 10	MNZ; 2; 37†	MNZ; 3 C	MUG; 1 Ret	MUG; 2; 20	MUG; 3; 21	25th	1

=== Complete ADAC Formula 4 Championship results ===
(key) (Races in bold indicate pole position) (Races in italics indicate fastest lap)

Year	Team	1	2	3	4	5	6	7	8	9	10	11	12	13	14	15	16	17	18	Pos	Points
2022	PHM Racing	SPA; 1; 9	SPA; 2; 7	SPA; 3 Ret	HOC; 1; 6	HOC; 2; 9	HOC; 3; 5	ZAN; 1 Ret	ZAN; 2; 14	ZAN; 3; 13	NÜR1; 1; 10	NÜR1; 2 Ret	NÜR1; 3; 9	LAU; 1; 7	LAU; 2; 5	LAU; 3; 7	NÜR2; 1 Ret	NÜR2; 2; 7	NÜR2; 3; 11	9th	71

=== Complete Asian Le Mans Series results ===
(key) (Races in bold indicate pole position) (Races in italics indicate fastest lap)

Year	Team	Class	Car	Engine	1	2	3	4	5	6	Pos.	Points
2023	Rinaldi Racing	LMP3	Duqueine M30 – D08	Nissan VK56DE 5.6L V8	DUB; 1; 4	DUB; 2 Ret	ABU; 1 Ret	ABU; 2 Ret			12nd	12
2023–24	ARC Bratislava	LMP2	Oreca 07	Gibson GK428 4.2 L V8	SEP; 1; 10	SEP; 2; 10	DUB; 10	ABU; 1; 11	ABU; 2; 8		14th	7
2024–25	Proton Competition	LMP2	Oreca 07	Gibson GK428 4.2 L V8	SEP; 1; 9	SEP; 2; 10	DUB; 1; 9	DUB; 2 Ret	ABU; 1; 5	ABU; 2; 5	10th	25
2025–26	Proton Competition	LMP2	Oreca 07	Gibson GK428 4.2 L V8	SEP; 1; 16	SEP; 2; 11	DUB; 1; 14	DUB; 2; 12	ABU; 1; 13	ABU; 2; 11	19th	0

=== Complete European Le Mans Series results ===
(key) (Races in bold indicate pole position; results in italics indicate fastest lap)

Year	Entrant	Class	Chassis	Engine	1	2	3	4	5	6	Rank	Points
2023	Proton Competition	LMP2 Pro-Am	Oreca 07	Gibson GK428 V8	CAT; 6	LEC; 6	ARA; 5	SPA; Ret	PRT; Ret	**ALG**; 7	11st	33
2024	Iron Lynx - Proton	LMP2	Oreca 07	Gibson GK428 4.2 L V8	CAT; Ret	LEC; 9	IMO; Ret	SPA; 7	**MUG**; 1	ALG; 9	8th	36
2025	Iron Lynx - Proton	LMP2	Oreca 07	Gibson GK428 4.2 L V8	CAT; 11	LEC; Ret	IMO; 4	SPA; 8	SIL; 7	**ALG**; 4	9th	35
2026	Proton Competition	LMP2	Oreca 07	Gibson GK428 4.2 L V8	CAT; Ret	LEC; 8	IMO; 8	SPA; 6	SIL; 8	ALG; 10	15th	21

^{*} Season still in progress.

=== Complete 24 Hours of Le Mans results ===
Year	Team	Co-Drivers	Car	Class	Laps	Pos.	Class Pos.
2023	(Germany) Proton Competition	(United Kingdom) Harry Tincknell (United States) Don Yount	Porsche 911 RSR-19	GTE; Am	170	DNF	DNF
2024	(Germany) Proton Competition	(France) Macéo Capietto (Netherlands) Bent Viscaal	Oreca 07-Gibson	LMP2	86	DNF	DNF
2025	(Germany) Iron Lynx – Proton	(France) Macéo Capietto (France) Reshad de Gerus	Oreca 07-Gibson	LMP2	365	21st	4th
2026	(Germany) Proton Competition	(United Kingdom) Harry King (Japan) Kakunoshin Ohta	Oreca 07-Gibson	LMP2	356	25th	8th
