= 2021 F4 Spanish Championship =

6th season of the Spanish F4 Championship

The 2021 F4 Spanish Championship was the sixth season of the Spanish F4 Championship. It was a multi-event motor racing championship for open wheel, formula racing cars regulated according to FIA Formula 4 regulations, based in Spain. The championship featured drivers competing in 1.4 litre Tatuus-Abarth single seat race cars that conformed to the technical regulations for the championship. The series was organised by RFEDA.

This was the last season of using Tatuus F4-T014 car. Starting from the next season, the series will feature Tatuus F4-T421.

== Entry list ==
Team	No.	Driver	Class	Rounds
(Spain) Drivex School	1	(Russia) Maksim Arkhangelskiy	R	All
(Spain) Drivex School	10	(France) Lola Lovinfosse	R F	All
(Spain) Drivex School	14	(Portugal) Guilherme Oliveira	R	All
(Spain) Drivex School	68	(United Kingdom) Branden Lee Oxley (Note: Branden Lee Oxley is a British-Thai driver who races under the British flag.)	R	All
(Spain) Drivex School	75	(France) Noam Abramczyk (Note: Noam Abramczyk is a French-Israeli driver who races under the French flag.)	R	All
(Spain) Drivex School	79	(Slovakia) Lukáš Málek	R	6
(Spain) Drivex School	79	(United Kingdom) Georgi Dimitrov (Note: Dimitrov is a British-Bulgarian driver racing under the British flag.)	R	7
(Spain) Teo Martín Motorsport	3	(Austria) Oliver Michl (Note: Oliver Michl is an Austrian-Hungarian driver who races under the Austrian flag.)	R	1–5, 7
(Spain) Teo Martín Motorsport	18	(Mexico) Jorge Campos	R	2–7
(Spain) Teo Martín Motorsport	19	(Serbia) Filip Jenić	R	All
(Switzerland) Jenzer Motorsport	4	(Switzerland) Samir Ben	R	1
(Switzerland) Jenzer Motorsport	5	(Mexico) Jorge Garciarce	R	1
(Switzerland) Jenzer Motorsport	6	(Italy) Francesco Braschi	R	1
(Switzerland) Jenzer Motorsport	8	(Mexico) Santiago Ramos	R	1
(Netherlands) MP Motorsport	7	(Netherlands) Emely de Heus	R F	All
(Netherlands) MP Motorsport	9	(Netherlands) Rik Koen	R	All
(Netherlands) MP Motorsport	12	(Mexico) Gil Molina	R	All
(Netherlands) MP Motorsport	13	(Italy) Santiago Trisini (Note: Santiago Trisini is an American-Venezuelan driver who races under the Italian flag.)	R	1–2
(Netherlands) MP Motorsport	17	(Netherlands) Dilano van 't Hoff	R	All
(Netherlands) MP Motorsport	29	(Denmark) Georg Kelstrup	R	All
(Netherlands) MP Motorsport	44	(Portugal) Manuel Espírito Santo	R	All
(Netherlands) MP Motorsport	52	(Morocco) Suleiman Zanfari		All
(Netherlands) MP Motorsport	55	(Russia) Miron Pingasov	R	5–7
(Netherlands) MP Motorsport	77	(Denmark) Noah Degnbol	R	All
(Republic of Ireland) Pinnacle Motorsport	11	(Republic of Ireland) Alex Dunne	R	1–3
(Spain) GRS Team	15	(India) Anshul Gandhi	R	5
(Spain) GRS Team	15	(Slovakia) Lukáš Málek	R	7
(Spain) GRS Team	26	(Russia) Vladislav Ryabov	R	All
(Spain) Campos Racing	23	(Spain) Pepe Martí	R	All
(Spain) Campos Racing	24	(Mexico) Alejandro García		All
(Spain) Campos Racing	25	(Denmark) Sebastian Øgaard		All
(Spain) Campos Racing	27	(Ukraine) Oleksandr Partyshev	R	All
(Spain) Fórmula de Campeones	28	(Spain) Daniel Maciá	R	All
(Spain) Fórmula de Campeones	34	(Spain) Enric Bordás		All
(Spain) Fórmula de Campeones	93	(Switzerland) Eron Rexhepi	R	5

- Enzo Trulli and Enzo Scionti were scheduled to compete for Drivex School, but withdrew prior to the start of the season and switched to Euroformula Open.

== Race calendar and results ==
Five rounds organized by RFEDA were announced on 17 October 2020. Another 2 rounds set to take place abroad were revealed on 19 October with their places and dates to be confirmed. An updated version with the round at Circuit de Spa-Francorchamps and one in Portugal added was published on 17 December 2020. Moreover, there were some tweaks to the dates of the national rounds. Autódromo Internacional do Algarve as the host of the Portuguese round was confirmed on 28 January 2021. Due to more travel restrictions, the planned season opener at Circuito del Jarama in April was cancelled and replaced with a round at Circuito de Navarra in May. As the official pre-season test of FIA World Endurance Championship was scheduled to take place at Circuit de Spa-Francorchamps and 24H Series moved its round to Circuit Paul Ricard, the series season opener was held one week later at the same location.

Round		Circuit	Date	Supporting
1	R1	(Belgium) Circuit de Spa-Francorchamps, Stavelot	30 April	FIA World Endurance Championship
1	R2	(Belgium) Circuit de Spa-Francorchamps, Stavelot	1 May (Note: The 18-minute race in Round 1 was scheduled for 30 April, but was moved to 1 May due to a schedule change with the WEC. The race is still considered Race 2, and the 25-minute Race 3 was held on 30 April instead of 1 May to compensate.)	FIA World Endurance Championship
1	R3	(Belgium) Circuit de Spa-Francorchamps, Stavelot	30 April	FIA World Endurance Championship
2	R1	(Spain) Circuito de Navarra, Los Arcos	29 May	GT-CER; TCR Spain CEST
2	R2	(Spain) Circuito de Navarra, Los Arcos	30 May	GT-CER; TCR Spain CEST
2	R3	(Spain) Circuito de Navarra, Los Arcos	30 May	GT-CER; TCR Spain CEST
3	R1	(Portugal) Algarve International Circuit, Portimão	16 July	
3	R2	(Portugal) Algarve International Circuit, Portimão	17 July	
3	R3	(Portugal) Algarve International Circuit, Portimão	17 July	
4	R1	(Spain) MotorLand Aragón, Alcañiz	1 August	GT-CER; TCR Spain CEST
4	R2	(Spain) MotorLand Aragón, Alcañiz	1 August	GT-CER; TCR Spain CEST
4	R3	(Spain) MotorLand Aragón, Alcañiz	1 August	GT-CER; TCR Spain CEST
5	R1	(Spain) Circuit Ricardo Tormo, Cheste	18 September	GT-CER; TCR Spain CEST
5	R2	(Spain) Circuit Ricardo Tormo, Cheste	19 September	GT-CER; TCR Spain CEST
5	R3	(Spain) Circuit Ricardo Tormo, Cheste	19 September	GT-CER; TCR Spain CEST
6	R1	(Spain) Circuito de Jerez, Jerez de la Frontera	2 October	GT-CER
6	R2	(Spain) Circuito de Jerez, Jerez de la Frontera	3 October	GT-CER
6	R3	(Spain) Circuito de Jerez, Jerez de la Frontera	3 October	GT-CER
7	R1	(Spain) Circuit de Barcelona-Catalunya	13 November	GT-CER; TCR Spain CEST
7	R2	(Spain) Circuit de Barcelona-Catalunya	14 November	GT-CER; TCR Spain CEST
7	R3	(Spain) Circuit de Barcelona-Catalunya	14 November	GT-CER; TCR Spain CEST

== Results ==
Races denoted with a blue background were 18-minute races, which yield less points than 25-minute races.

Round		Circuit	Pole position	Fastest lap	Winning driver	Winning team	Secondary class winner
1	R1	(Belgium) Circuit de Spa-Francorchamps	(Republic of Ireland) Alex Dunne	(Spain) Daniel Maciá	(Netherlands) Dilano van 't Hoff	(Netherlands) MP Motorsport	R: (Netherlands) Dilano van 't Hoff; F: (France) Lola Lovinfosse
1	R2	(Belgium) Circuit de Spa-Francorchamps	(Netherlands) Dilano van 't Hoff	(Netherlands) Dilano van 't Hoff	(Denmark) Georg Kelstrup	(Netherlands) MP Motorsport	R: (Denmark) Georg Kelstrup; F: (France) Lola Lovinfosse
1	R3	(Belgium) Circuit de Spa-Francorchamps	(Netherlands) Dilano van 't Hoff	(Netherlands) Rik Koen	(Netherlands) Dilano van 't Hoff	(Netherlands) MP Motorsport	R: (Netherlands) Dilano van 't Hoff; F: (Netherlands) Emely de Heus
2	R1	(Spain) Circuito de Navarra	(Netherlands) Dilano van 't Hoff	(Denmark) Noah Degnbol	(Spain) Enric Bordás	(Spain) Fórmula de Campeones	R: (Netherlands) Dilano van 't Hoff; F: (France) Lola Lovinfosse
2	R2	(Spain) Circuito de Navarra	(Spain) Enric Bordás	(Netherlands) Dilano van 't Hoff	(Spain) Enric Bordás	(Spain) Fórmula de Campeones	R: (Spain) Daniel Maciá; F: (Netherlands) Emely de Heus
2	R3	(Spain) Circuito de Navarra	(Spain) Enric Bordás	(Spain) Enric Bordás	(Netherlands) Dilano van 't Hoff	(Netherlands) MP Motorsport	R: (Netherlands) Dilano van 't Hoff; F: (France) Lola Lovinfosse
3	R1	(Portugal) Algarve International Circuit	(Netherlands) Dilano van 't Hoff	(Denmark) Sebastian Øgaard	(Denmark) Sebastian Øgaard	(Spain) Campos Racing	R: (Spain) Daniel Maciá; F: (France) Lola Lovinfosse
3	R2	(Portugal) Algarve International Circuit	(Netherlands) Dilano van 't Hoff	(France) Noam Abramczyk	(Denmark) Sebastian Øgaard	(Spain) Campos Racing	R: (Netherlands) Dilano van 't Hoff; F: (France) Lola Lovinfosse
3	R3	(Portugal) Algarve International Circuit	(Netherlands) Dilano van 't Hoff	(Spain) Pepe Martí	(Netherlands) Dilano van 't Hoff	(Netherlands) MP Motorsport	R: (Netherlands) Dilano van 't Hoff; F: (France) Lola Lovinfosse
4	R1	(Spain) MotorLand Aragón	(Netherlands) Dilano van 't Hoff	(Netherlands) Dilano van 't Hoff	(Netherlands) Dilano van 't Hoff	(Netherlands) MP Motorsport	R: (Netherlands) Dilano van 't Hoff; F: (France) Lola Lovinfosse
4	R2	(Spain) MotorLand Aragón	(Spain) Pepe Martí	(Spain) Pepe Martí	(Spain) Pepe Martí	(Spain) Campos Racing	R: (Spain) Pepe Martí; F: (Netherlands) Emely de Heus
4	R3	(Spain) MotorLand Aragón	(Spain) Pepe Martí	(Portugal) Guilherme Oliveira	(Spain) Pepe Martí	(Spain) Campos Racing	R: (Spain) Pepe Martí; F: (France) Lola Lovinfosse
5	R1	(Spain) Circuit Ricardo Tormo, Cheste	(Netherlands) Dilano van 't Hoff	(Netherlands) Dilano van 't Hoff	(Denmark) Sebastian Øgaard	(Spain) Campos Racing	R: (Spain) Pepe Martí; F: (Netherlands) Emely de Heus
5	R2	(Spain) Circuit Ricardo Tormo, Cheste	(Netherlands) Dilano van 't Hoff	(Netherlands) Rik Koen	(Netherlands) Dilano van 't Hoff	(Netherlands) MP Motorsport	R: (Netherlands) Dilano van 't Hoff; F: (France) Lola Lovinfosse
5	R3	(Spain) Circuit Ricardo Tormo, Cheste	(Netherlands) Dilano van 't Hoff	(Spain) Pepe Martí	(Denmark) Sebastian Øgaard	(Spain) Campos Racing	R: (Netherlands) Dilano van 't Hoff; F: (France) Lola Lovinfosse
6	R1	(Spain) Circuito de Jerez	(Netherlands) Dilano van 't Hoff	(Netherlands) Dilano van 't Hoff	(Netherlands) Dilano van 't Hoff	(Netherlands) MP Motorsport	R: (Netherlands) Dilano van 't Hoff; F: (Netherlands) Emely de Heus
6	R2	(Spain) Circuito de Jerez	(Netherlands) Dilano van 't Hoff	(Russia) Vladislav Ryabov	(Netherlands) Dilano van 't Hoff	(Netherlands) MP Motorsport	R: (Netherlands) Dilano van 't Hoff; F: (France) Lola Lovinfosse
6	R3	(Spain) Circuito de Jerez	(Netherlands) Dilano van 't Hoff	(Netherlands) Dilano van 't Hoff	(Netherlands) Dilano van 't Hoff	(Netherlands) MP Motorsport	R: (Netherlands) Dilano van 't Hoff; F: (Netherlands) Emely de Heus
7	R1	(Spain) Circuit de Barcelona-Catalunya	(Spain) Daniel Maciá	(Netherlands) Rik Koen	(Netherlands) Dilano van 't Hoff	(Netherlands) MP Motorsport	R: (Netherlands) Dilano van 't Hoff; F: (Netherlands) Emely de Heus
7	R2	(Spain) Circuit de Barcelona-Catalunya	(Netherlands) Rik Koen	(Netherlands) Rik Koen	(Serbia) Filip Jenić	(Spain) Teo Martín Motorsport	R: (Serbia) Filip Jenić; F: (Netherlands) Emely de Heus
7	R3	(Spain) Circuit de Barcelona-Catalunya	(Spain) Pepe Martí	(Spain) Pepe Martí	(Denmark) Sebastian Øgaard	(Spain) Campos Racing	R: (Denmark) Noah Degnbol; F: (France) Lola Lovinfosse

== Championship standings ==
Points were awarded to the top ten classified finishers in 25-minute races and for the top eight classified finishers in 18-minute races.

Races	Position, points per race											
Races	**1st**	**2nd**	**3rd**	**4th**	**5th**	**6th**	**7th**	**8th**	**9th**	**10th**	**Pole**	**FL**
25-minute races	25	18	15	12	10	8	6	4	2	1	2	1
18-minute races	15	12	10	8	6	4	2	1				1

=== Drivers' championship ===
Pos	Driver	SPA (Belgium)			NAV (Spain)			ALG (Portugal)			ARA (Spain)			CRT (Spain)			JER (Spain)			CAT (Spain)			Pts
1	(Netherlands) Dilano van 't Hoff	1	**2**	**1**	**2**	4	1	**3**	**2**	**1**	**1**	2	4	**20**	**1**	**2**	**1**	**1**	**1**	1	13	Ret	361
2	(Denmark) Sebastian Øgaard	9	3	7	5	22	3	1	1	6	9	3	5	1	4	1	4	5	7	5	NC	1	231
3	(Spain) Pepe Martí	5	6	2	12	10	9	Ret	3	12	3	**1**	**1**	2	11	7	5	3	3	2	11	**4**	196
4	(Spain) Enric Bordás	4	16	9	1	**1**	**19**	4	4	10	10	6	13	5	5	4	3	4	2	18	14	12	152
5	(Spain) Daniel Maciá	2	Ret	6	11	2	4	2	12	2	7	21	2	Ret	2	Ret	8	7	19	**Ret**	9	10	132
6	(Netherlands) Rik Koen	16	11	4	6	13	18	Ret	7	3	6	Ret	6	9	3	5	6	10	5	4	**2**	18	121
7	(Denmark) Noah Degnbol	14	8	5	4	3	2	21	13	8	Ret	7	9	12	9	13	Ret	11	8	3	3	2	107
8	(Russia) Vladislav Ryabov	19	7	Ret	25†	19	11	13	5	4	2	4	8	21	6	19†	2	2	Ret	Ret	17	5	95
9	(Russia) Maksim Arkhangelskiy	18	9	8	15	11	6	5	8	5	5	5	20	3	18	Ret	Ret	Ret	12	9	24	3	81
10	(Denmark) Georg Kelstrup	7	1	11	3	6	Ret	9	6	11	8	Ret	7	15	12	8	9	9	11	10	12	9	65
11	(Morocco) Suleiman Zanfari	12	12	Ret	10	8	15	20	10	9	11	14	15	4	14	6	7	8	4	21	8	6	52
12	(Serbia) Filip Jenić	10	17	14	9	7	14	7	9	15	20	19	18	11	8	3	11	Ret	13	8	1	8	50
13	(Portugal) Guilherme Oliveira	Ret	22	20	8	9	20	WD	WD	WD	4	10	3	22	16	16	Ret	6	9	13	6	7	48
14	(France) Noam Abramczyk	Ret	Ret	18	24†	15	10	6	11	7	Ret	12	11	8	7	Ret	10	Ret	17	6	4	11	39
15	(Mexico) Santiago Ramos	6	4	3																			31
16	(Republic of Ireland) Alex Dunne	**3**	5	25	14	14	7	10	15	Ret													30
17	(Portugal) Manuel Espírito Santo	13	18	10	7	5	8	8	22	22†	12	11	23†	Ret	Ret	10	12	Ret	6	12	Ret	19	30
18	(Mexico) Gil Molina	Ret	20	19	16	12	5	11	23†	16	13	9	22†	6	22	11	18	13	10	16	23	17	19
19	(United Kingdom) Branden Lee Oxley	17	Ret	26†	18	18	12	14	16	14	14	13	14	7	Ret	14	Ret	18	16	19	5	13	12
20	(Russia) Miron Pingasov													13	23	20†	16	12	Ret	7	10	23	6
21	(Italy) Francesco Braschi	8	19	23†																			4
22	(Mexico) Jorge Campos				21	17	16	19	18	17	21	16	10	19	21	9	13	14	Ret	22	21	Ret	3
23	(Austria) Oliver Michl	Ret	10	12	17	16	Ret	15	19	18	15	15	21	17	13	15				17	7	14	2
24	(Mexico) Alejandro García	11	15	24†	19	Ret	Ret	12	14	21†	19	8	19	10	10	Ret	15	15	15	11	22	Ret	2
25	(Ukraine) Oleksandr Partyshev	20	Ret	17	23	Ret	Ret	16	20	20†	17	17	12	16	15	12	14	16	14	Ret	15	15	0
26	(Italy) Santiago Trisini	21	13	13	13	Ret	13																0
27	(France) Lola Lovinfosse	23	21	22	20	21	17	17	17	13	18	18	16	Ret	17	17	19	17	Ret	Ret	20	20	0
28	(Mexico) Jorge Garciarce	22	14	15																			0
29	(Netherlands) Emely de Heus	24	23	21	22	20	21	18	21	19	16	20	17	14	19	21†	17	19	20	20	16	22	0
30	(Switzerland) Samir Ben	15	Ret	16																			0
31	(India) Anshul Gandhi													18	20	18							0
–	(Switzerland) Eron Rexhepi													WD	WD	WD							–
Guest drivers ineligible to score points
–	(Slovakia) Lukáš Málek																20	20	18	14	18	16	–
–	(United Kingdom) Georgi Dimitrov																			15	19	21	–
Pos	Driver	SPA (Belgium)			NAV (Spain)			ALG (Portugal)			ARA (Spain)			CRT (Spain)			JER (Spain)			CAT (Spain)			Pts

Colour	Result
Gold	Winner
Silver	Second place
Bronze	Third place
Green	Points classification
Blue	Non-points classification
Blue	Non-classified finish (NC)
Purple	Retired, not classified (Ret)
Red	Did not qualify (DNQ)
Red	Did not pre-qualify (DNPQ)
Black	Disqualified (DSQ)
White	Did not start (DNS)
White	Withdrew (WD)
White	Race cancelled (C)
Blank	Did not practice (DNP)
Blank	Did not arrive (DNA)
Blank	Excluded (EX)

**Bold** – Pole
Italics – Fastest Lap
† — Did not finish but classified

=== Secondary Classes' standings ===
Pos	Driver	SPA (Belgium)			NAV (Spain)			ALG (Portugal)			ARA (Spain)			CRT (Spain)			JER (Spain)			CAT (Spain)			Pts
Rookie Trophy
1	(Netherlands) Dilano van 't Hoff	1	2	1	1	3	1	2	1	1	1	2	4	16	1	1	1	1	1	1	12	Ret	359
2	(Spain) Pepe Martí	4	5	2	9	8	8	Ret	2	9	3	1	1	1	8	4	3	3	2	2	10	3	226
3	(Spain) Daniel Maciá	2	Ret	6	8	1	3	1	9	2	7	17	2	Ret	2	Ret	5	5	15	Ret	8	8	160
4	(Netherlands) Rik Koen	12	10	4	4	11	16	Ret	5	3	6	Ret	5	6	3	3	4	7	3	4	2	15	149
5	(Denmark) Noah Degnbol	10	7	5	3	2	2	17	10	7	Ret	5	8	8	7	10	Ret	8	5	3	3	1	142
6	(Denmark) Georg Kelstrup	6	1	9	2	5	Ret	7	4	8	8	Ret	6	11	9	5	6	6	8	9	11	7	113
7	(Russia) Vladislav Ryabov	15	6	Ret	21†	17	10	10	3	4	2	3	7	17	4	16†	2	2	Ret	Ret	15	4	112
8	(Russia) Maksim Arkhangelskiy	14	8	7	12	9	5	3	6	5	5	4	16	2	14	Ret	Ret	Ret	9	8	21	2	106
9	(Serbia) Filip Jenić	8	13	12	7	6	13	5	7	12	16	15	15	7	6	2	8	Ret	10	7	1	6	88
10	(Portugal) Guilherme Oliveira	Ret	18	18	6	7	17	WD	WD	WD	4	7	3	18	12	13	Ret	4	6	11	6	5	69
11	(France) Noam Abramczyk	Ret	Ret	16	20†	13	9	4	8	6	Ret	9	10	5	5	Ret	7	Ret	13	5	4	9	66
12	(Portugal) Manuel Espírito Santo	9	14	8	5	4	7	6	18	18†	9	8	19†	Ret	Ret	7	9	Ret	4	10	Ret	16	62
13	(Mexico) Gil Molina	Ret	16	17	13	10	4	9	19†	13	10	6	18†	3	18	8	14	10	7	14	20	14	44
14	(Mexico) Santiago Ramos	5	3	3																			35
15	(Republic of Ireland) Alex Dunne	3	4	22	11	12	6	8	11	Ret													35
16	(United Kingdom) Branden Lee Oxley	13	Ret	23†	15	16	11	11	12	11	11	10	12	4	Ret	11	Ret	14	12	16	5	10	19
17	(Mexico) Jorge Campos				17	15	14	16	14	14	17	12	9	15	17	6	10	11	Ret	18	19	Ret	11
18	(Russia) Miron Pingasov													9	19	17†	12	9	Ret	6	9	20	10
19	(Italy) Francesco Braschi	7	15	21†																			6
20	(Austria) Oliver Michl	Ret	9	10	14	14	Ret	12	15	15	12	11	17	13	10	12				15	7	11	3
21	(Ukraine) Oleksandr Partyshev	16	Ret	15	19	Ret	Ret	13	16	17†	14	13	11	12	11	9	11	12	11	Ret	13	12	2
22	(Italy) Santiago Trisini	17	11	11	10	Ret	12																1
23	(France) Lola Lovinfosse	19	17	20	16	19	15	14	13	10	15	14	13	Ret	13	14	15	13	Ret	Ret	18	17	1
24	(Netherlands) Emely de Heus	20	19	19	18	18	18	15	17	16	13	16	14	10	15	18†	13	15	16	17	14	19	1
25	(Switzerland) Samir Ben	11	Ret	14																			0
26	(Slovakia) Lukáš Málek																16	16	14	12	16	13	0
27	(Mexico) Jorge Garciarce	18	12	13																			0
28	(United Kingdom) Georgi Dimitrov																			13	17	18	0
29	(India) Anshul Gandhi													14	16	15							0
—	(Switzerland) Eron Rexhepi													WD	WD	WD							—
Female Trophy
1	(Netherlands) Emely de Heus	2	2	1	2	1	2	2	2	2	1	2	2	1	2	2†	1	2	1	1	1	2	384
2	(France) Lola Lovinfosse	1	1	2	1	2	1	1	1	1	2	1	1	Ret	1	1	2	1	Ret	Ret	2	1	353
Pos	Driver	SPA (Belgium)			NAV (Spain)			ALG (Portugal)			ARA (Spain)			CRT (Spain)			JER (Spain)			CAT (Spain)			Pts

Colour	Result
Gold	Winner
Silver	Second place
Bronze	Third place
Green	Points classification
Blue	Non-points classification
Blue	Non-classified finish (NC)
Purple	Retired, not classified (Ret)
Red	Did not qualify (DNQ)
Red	Did not pre-qualify (DNPQ)
Black	Disqualified (DSQ)
White	Did not start (DNS)
White	Withdrew (WD)
White	Race cancelled (C)
Blank	Did not practice (DNP)
Blank	Did not arrive (DNA)
Blank	Excluded (EX)

† — Did not finish but classified

=== Teams' standings ===
Two best finishers scored points for their team. Bonus points were not counted.

Pos	Driver	Points
1	(Netherlands) MP Motorsport	586
2	(Spain) Campos Racing	416
3	(Spain) Fórmula de Campeones	277
4	(Spain) Drivex School	172
5	(Spain) GRS Team	94
6	(Spain) Teo Martín Motorsport	60
7	(Switzerland) Jenzer Motorsport	35
8	(Republic of Ireland) Pinnacle Motorsport	28
