= 2022 Formula 4 UAE Championship =

Motor racing competition

The 2022 Formula 4 UAE Championship was the sixth season of the Formula 4 UAE Championship, a motor racing series for the United Arab Emirates regulated according to FIA Formula 4 regulations, and organised and promoted by the Emirates Motorsport Organization (EMSO) and AUH Motorsports. This was the first season of using Tatuus F4-T421 chassis.

It commenced on 20 January at Yas Marina Circuit and concluded at the same venue on 19 February.

== Teams and drivers ==
Team	No.	Drivers	Class	Rounds
(United Kingdom) Hitech GP	4	(Republic of Ireland) Alex Dunne		All
(United Kingdom) Hitech GP	5	(United Kingdom) Oliver Gray		1–2
(United Kingdom) Hitech GP	5	(United Kingdom) Luke Browning		3–4
(United Arab Emirates) Xcel Motorsport (Note: Cars No. 6, 11, 24, 57 and 89 entered as Xcel Motorsport and cars No. 17, 28, 37 and 100 entered as Mumbai Falcons by Xcel.) (India) Mumbai Falcons by Xcel	6	(Thailand) Nandhavud Bhirombhakdi	R	All
(United Arab Emirates) Xcel Motorsport (India) Mumbai Falcons by Xcel	11	(Uzbekistan) Ismoilkhuja Akhmedkhodjaev	R	All
(United Arab Emirates) Xcel Motorsport (India) Mumbai Falcons by Xcel	17	(India) Yash Aradhya		3–4
(United Arab Emirates) Xcel Motorsport (India) Mumbai Falcons by Xcel	24	(United Arab Emirates) Jamie Day		TR, All
(United Arab Emirates) Xcel Motorsport (India) Mumbai Falcons by Xcel	28	(India) Sohil Shah		1–3, 5
(United Arab Emirates) Xcel Motorsport (India) Mumbai Falcons by Xcel	37	(India) Ruhaan Alva	R	4
(United Arab Emirates) Xcel Motorsport (India) Mumbai Falcons by Xcel	57	(United Kingdom) Aiden Neate		TR
(United Arab Emirates) Xcel Motorsport (India) Mumbai Falcons by Xcel	89	(Portugal) Ivan Domingues	R	All
(United Arab Emirates) Xcel Motorsport (India) Mumbai Falcons by Xcel	100	(United Arab Emirates) Kyle Kumaran (Note: Kumaran is an Indian driver racing under an Emirati licence.)	R	5
(United Arab Emirates) Abu Dhabi Racing by Prema	7	(Austria) Charlie Wurz		TR
(United Arab Emirates) Abu Dhabi Racing by Prema	13	(Australia) James Wharton	R	1–2, 4–5
(United Arab Emirates) Abu Dhabi Racing by Prema	20	(Denmark) Conrad Laursen		TR, 4–5
(United Arab Emirates) Abu Dhabi Racing by Prema	57	(United Kingdom) Aiden Neate		All
(United Arab Emirates) Abu Dhabi Racing by Prema	88	(United Arab Emirates) Hamda Al Qubaisi		TR
(United Arab Emirates) Abu Dhabi Racing by Prema	99	(Italy) Andrea Kimi Antonelli		TR, 3
(Italy) Prema Racing	7	(Austria) Charlie Wurz		All
(Italy) Prema Racing	88	(Brazil) Rafael Câmara	R	2–5
(Italy) Prema Racing	99	(Italy) Andrea Kimi Antonelli		1
(Netherlands) MP Motorsport	9	(Netherlands) Rik Koen		TR, 1–2
(Netherlands) MP Motorsport	10	(Italy) Valerio Rinicella	R	3–5
(Netherlands) MP Motorsport	14	(Thailand) Tasanapol Inthraphuvasak		All
(Netherlands) MP Motorsport	17	(Netherlands) Dilano van 't Hoff		TR
(Netherlands) MP Motorsport	25	(Morocco) Suleiman Zanfari		All
(Netherlands) MP Motorsport	26	(Russia) Vladislav Ryabov		TR
(Netherlands) MP Motorsport	51	(Singapore) Christian Ho	R	3–5
(Netherlands) MP Motorsport	55	(Spain) Miron Pingasov (Note: Pingasov is a Russian driver racing under a Spanish licence.)		TR, All
(Germany) PHM Racing	15	(Russia) Nikita Bedrin		All
(Germany) PHM Racing	41	(Germany) Jonas Ried		All
(Germany) PHM Racing	77	(United Kingdom) Taylor Barnard		All
(San Marino) AKM Motorsport	19	(Italy) Brando Badoer	R	1–4
(San Marino) AKM Motorsport	91	(Italy) Loris Spinelli		2
(Republic of Ireland) Pinnacle Motorsport	22	(Netherlands) Robert de Haan		3–5
(Republic of Ireland) Pinnacle Motorsport	52	(Belgium) Jef Machiels	R	3–5
(Republic of Ireland) Pinnacle Motorsport	96	(Belgium) Jules Castro	R	1–2
(Spain) GRS Team	26	(Russia) Vladislav Ryabov		All
(Italy) Cram – Hitech GP	27	(Mexico) Ricardo Escotto	R	All
(Italy) Cram – Hitech GP	33	(India) Anshul Gandhi		All
(United Kingdom) JHR Developments	42	(South Korea) Michael Shin	R	All
(United Kingdom) JHR Developments	84	(United Kingdom) Joseph Loake		2–3
(United Arab Emirates) 3Y by R-ace GP	45	(Norway) Martinius Stenshorne	R	All
(United Arab Emirates) 3Y by R-ace GP	46	(Russia) Victoria Blokhina	R	1–4
(United Arab Emirates) 3Y by R-ace GP	46	(Russia) Maksim Arkhangelskiy		5
(United Arab Emirates) 3Y by R-ace GP	47	(Singapore) Nikhil Bohra (Note: Bohra is an American-Indian driver racing under a Singaporean licence.)	R	All

Icon	Legend
R	Rookie

- Lucas Alanen was scheduled to compete for Xcel Motorsport, but did not appear in any rounds.
- Eron Rexhepi was scheduled to compete for AKM Motorsport, but did not appear in any rounds.
- Carlin were scheduled to enter the championship with two cars, but did not appear in any rounds.

== Race calendar ==
All rounds were held in the United Arab Emirates. The schedule consisted of 20 races over 5 rounds. Prior to the start of the season, a non-championship Trophy Round was planned be held in the support of the 2021 Abu Dhabi Grand Prix but due to delays in cargo it was turned into an exhibition-style event with a grid of only 10 cars. Further tweaks in the calendar were published on 2 January 2022, which included postponing the first round at Dubai Autodrome from 12 to 14 January by two weeks.

Round		Circuit	Date	Pole position	Fastest lap	Winning driver	Winning team	Supporting
2021
TR		Yas Marina Circuit, Abu Dhabi (Grand Prix Circuit)	12 December	(Italy) Andrea Kimi Antonelli	(Austria) Charlie Wurz	(Austria) Charlie Wurz	(United Arab Emirates) Abu Dhabi Racing by Prema	Formula One
2022
1	R1	Yas Marina Circuit, Abu Dhabi (Grand Prix Circuit)	21 January	(Thailand) Tasanapol Inthraphuvasak	(Thailand) Tasanapol Inthraphuvasak	(Italy) Andrea Kimi Antonelli	(Italy) Prema Racing	6 Hours of Abu Dhabi; Formula Regional Asian Championship; Gulf Radical Cup
1	R2	Yas Marina Circuit, Abu Dhabi (Grand Prix Circuit)	22 January	(Thailand) Tasanapol Inthraphuvasak	(Italy) Andrea Kimi Antonelli	(Italy) Andrea Kimi Antonelli	(Italy) Prema Racing	6 Hours of Abu Dhabi; Formula Regional Asian Championship; Gulf Radical Cup
1	R3	Yas Marina Circuit, Abu Dhabi (Grand Prix Circuit)	22 January	(Italy) Andrea Kimi Antonelli	(Australia) James Wharton	(Thailand) Tasanapol Inthraphuvasak (Note: Antonelli and Neate finished first and second but were given 10 and 5-second time penalties respectively for crossing the pit exit blend line during racing conditions. Inthraphuvasak inherited the win.)	(Netherlands) MP Motorsport	6 Hours of Abu Dhabi; Formula Regional Asian Championship; Gulf Radical Cup
1	R4	Yas Marina Circuit, Abu Dhabi (Grand Prix Circuit)	23 January		(Italy) Andrea Kimi Antonelli	(United Kingdom) Taylor Barnard	(Germany) PHM Racing	6 Hours of Abu Dhabi; Formula Regional Asian Championship; Gulf Radical Cup
2	R1	Dubai Autodrome, Dubai (International Circuit)	29 January	(Australia) James Wharton	(Australia) James Wharton	(Australia) James Wharton	(United Arab Emirates) Abu Dhabi Racing by Prema	Formula Regional Asian Championship; UAE Touring Car Championship
2	R2	Dubai Autodrome, Dubai (International Circuit)	29 January	(Australia) James Wharton	(United Kingdom) Aiden Neate	(Australia) James Wharton	(United Arab Emirates) Abu Dhabi Racing by Prema	Formula Regional Asian Championship; UAE Touring Car Championship
2	R3	Dubai Autodrome, Dubai (International Circuit)	30 January	(Australia) James Wharton	(Australia) James Wharton	(Australia) James Wharton	(United Arab Emirates) Abu Dhabi Racing by Prema	Formula Regional Asian Championship; UAE Touring Car Championship
2	R4	Dubai Autodrome, Dubai (International Circuit)	30 January		(Australia) James Wharton	(Russia) Nikita Bedrin	(Germany) PHM Racing	Formula Regional Asian Championship; UAE Touring Car Championship
3	R1	Dubai Autodrome, Dubai (Grand Prix Circuit)	5 February	(Austria) Charlie Wurz	(Russia) Nikita Bedrin	(Brazil) Rafael Câmara	(Italy) Prema Racing	Formula Regional Asian Championship; Gulf Radical Cup; UAE Touring Car Championship
3	R2	Dubai Autodrome, Dubai (Grand Prix Circuit)	6 February	(Austria) Charlie Wurz	(Austria) Charlie Wurz	(Austria) Charlie Wurz	(Italy) Prema Racing	Formula Regional Asian Championship; Gulf Radical Cup; UAE Touring Car Championship
3	R3	Dubai Autodrome, Dubai (Grand Prix Circuit)	6 February	(Brazil) Rafael Câmara	(United Kingdom) Aiden Neate	(Brazil) Rafael Câmara	(Italy) Prema Racing	Formula Regional Asian Championship; Gulf Radical Cup; UAE Touring Car Championship
3	R4	Dubai Autodrome, Dubai (Grand Prix Circuit)	6 February		(Italy) Andrea Kimi Antonelli	(Republic of Ireland) Alex Dunne (Note: Antonelli finished first but was given a 5-second time penalty for breaching the red flag procedure. Dunne inherited the win.)	(United Kingdom) Hitech GP	Formula Regional Asian Championship; Gulf Radical Cup; UAE Touring Car Championship
4	R1	Dubai Autodrome, Dubai (Grand Prix Circuit)	12 February	(Brazil) Rafael Câmara	(Brazil) Rafael Câmara	(Brazil) Rafael Câmara	(Italy) Prema Racing	Asian Le Mans Series; Formula Regional Asian Championship
4	R2	Dubai Autodrome, Dubai (Grand Prix Circuit)	12 February	(Austria) Charlie Wurz	(Brazil) Rafael Câmara	(Brazil) Rafael Câmara	(Italy) Prema Racing	Asian Le Mans Series; Formula Regional Asian Championship
4	R3	Dubai Autodrome, Dubai (Grand Prix Circuit)	13 February	(Portugal) Ivan Domingues	(Austria) Charlie Wurz	(Austria) Charlie Wurz	(Italy) Prema Racing	Asian Le Mans Series; Formula Regional Asian Championship
4	R4	Dubai Autodrome, Dubai (Grand Prix Circuit)	13 February		(Brazil) Rafael Câmara	(Brazil) Rafael Câmara	(Italy) Prema Racing	Asian Le Mans Series; Formula Regional Asian Championship
5	R1	Yas Marina Circuit, Abu Dhabi (Grand Prix Circuit)	18 February	(Brazil) Rafael Câmara	(Russia) Vladislav Ryabov	(Brazil) Rafael Câmara	(Italy) Prema Racing	Asian Le Mans Series; Formula Regional Asian Championship
5	R2	Yas Marina Circuit, Abu Dhabi (Grand Prix Circuit)	18 February	(Russia) Nikita Bedrin	(Brazil) Rafael Câmara	(Russia) Nikita Bedrin (Note: Câmara finished first but was given a 5-second time penalty for breaching the red flag procedure. Bedrin inherited the win.)	(Germany) PHM Racing	Asian Le Mans Series; Formula Regional Asian Championship
5	R3	Yas Marina Circuit, Abu Dhabi (Grand Prix Circuit)	19 February	(Brazil) Rafael Câmara	(Republic of Ireland) Alex Dunne	(Republic of Ireland) Alex Dunne	(United Kingdom) Hitech GP	Asian Le Mans Series; Formula Regional Asian Championship
5	R4	Yas Marina Circuit, Abu Dhabi (Grand Prix Circuit)	19 February		(Brazil) Rafael Câmara	(Australia) James Wharton	(United Arab Emirates) Abu Dhabi Racing by Prema	Asian Le Mans Series; Formula Regional Asian Championship

== Championship standings ==
Points were awarded to the top 10 classified finishers in each race.

Position	**1st**	**2nd**	**3rd**	**4th**	**5th**	**6th**	**7th**	**8th**	**9th**	**10th**	**FL**
Points	25	18	15	12	10	8	6	4	2	1	1

=== Drivers' Championship ===
Pos	Driver	YMC TR	YMC1				DUB1				DUB2				DUB3				YMC2				Pts
Pos	Driver	YMC TR	R1	R2	R3	R4	R1	R2	R3	R4	R1	R2	R3	R4	R1	R2	R3	R4	R1	R2	R3	R4	Pts
1	(Austria) Charlie Wurz	1	8	7	2	6	3	4	2	7	**3**	**1**	3	9	2	**2**	1	8	5	4	2	8	255
2	(Brazil) Rafael Câmara						17	12	9	3	1	4	**1**	7	**1**	1	9	1	**1**	2	**Ret**	24	210
3	(United Kingdom) Aiden Neate	7	2	2	4	Ret	4	2	3	8	17	3	2	3	Ret	7	5	7	3	3	19	12	199
4	(Russia) Nikita Bedrin		6	6	Ret	DNS	8	11	7	1	2	2	7	6	3	6	4	5	2	**1**	Ret	6	198
5	(Australia) James Wharton		3	5	24	9	**1**	**1**	**1**	6					8	11	10	4	Ret	14	4	1	168
6	(Republic of Ireland) Alex Dunne		4	9	23	10	9	6	6	21	8	8	8	1	4	3	7	9	4	5	1	3	168
7	(Thailand) Tasanapol Inthraphuvasak		**14**	**4**	1	4	2	3	4	17	6	6	6	8	5	5	Ret	12	7	8	6	9	163
8	(Italy) Andrea Kimi Antonelli	**3**	1	1	**3**	2					4	Ret	10	2									117
9	(United Kingdom) Taylor Barnard		12	8	6	1	6	8	16	Ret	7	Ret	Ret	13	Ret	9	6	15	6	7	21	10	80
10	(Norway) Martinius Stenshorne		7	Ret	Ret	16	5	DNS	12	2	5	Ret	9	4	6	8	13	17	Ret	9	14	11	72
11	(United Kingdom) Luke Browning										12	5	4	5	9	4	2	Ret					64
12	(Denmark) Conrad Laursen	2													10	12	8	3	Ret	6	5	2	56
13	(United Arab Emirates) Jamie Day	5	Ret	15	7	3	7	9	19	15	16	10	19	11	17	19	11	2	22	21	13	13	48
14	(Spain) Miron Pingasov	8	24	20	9	5	25	Ret	8	10	19	9	Ret	Ret	11	27†	12	6	8	Ret	8	4	47
15	(United Kingdom) Oliver Gray		11	3	11	8	Ret	5	5	9													41
16	(Portugal) Ivan Domingues		17	12	12	11	22	20	13	20	9	25	13	10	7	17	**3**	Ret	26	11	3	Ret	39
17	(Morocco) Suleiman Zanfari		Ret	14	10	12	13	13	11	4	11	22	12	26†	Ret	Ret	15	14	11	10	7	7	26
18	(Netherlands) Rik Koen	DSQ	5	11	8	7	12	10	10	13													22
19	(Russia) Vladislav Ryabov	4	9	24†	5	Ret	11	7	24	22	20	12	17	Ret	15	25	21	21	10	25†	17	23	20
20	(Singapore) Nikhil Bohra		15	Ret	Ret	14	14	17	14	25	Ret	7	16	12	Ret	26	29	24	14	18	10	5	17
21	(Singapore) Christian Ho										10	24	5	27†	12	10	16	10	20	16	11	Ret	13
22	(Italy) Loris Spinelli						Ret	Ret	17	5													10
23	(Germany) Jonas Ried		16	13	16	19	15	14	26	11	26	17	20	19	18	13	22	19	9	24†	9	18	4
24	(India) Sohil Shah		10	10	15	Ret	10	15	15	16	13	15	18	17					16	20	18	14	3
25	(Mexico) Ricardo Escotto		13	16	14	15	18	16	23	18	14	Ret	14	14	16	18	19	11	17	Ret	16	25	0
26	(Italy) Valerio Rinicella										Ret	Ret	11	18	14	15	Ret	13	15	17	Ret	17	0
27	(United Kingdom) Joseph Loake						16	Ret	18	24	18	11	23	16									0
28	(Italy) Brando Badoer		Ret	23†	17	23	20	Ret	25	12	25	14	15	25	13	14	14	16					0
29	(South Korea) Michael Shin		18	18	20	13	24	18	28	14	Ret	26	Ret	15	20	21	18	22	12	19	15	20	0
30	(Netherlands) Robert de Haan										15	16	22	21	19	16	23	20	13	Ret	12	26	0
31	(Russia) Maksim Arkhangelskiy																		19	12	20	15	0
32	(India) Anshul Gandhi		22	17	18	18	27	19	21	19	21	13	21	20	25	20	17	18	23	13	Ret	27†	0
33	(Belgium) Jules Castro		19	Ret	13	22	21	21	27	27†													0
34	(Thailand) Nandhavud Bhirombhakdi		20	22	21	17	19	23	20	26	28†	19	24	Ret	Ret	22	20	Ret	18	15	22	16	0
35	(India) Yash Aradhya										27	18	25	22	22	DSQ	25	26					0
36	(Uzbekistan) Ismoilkhuja Akhmedkhodjaev		23	21	19	20	26	24	29†	Ret	24	20	27	23	26	Ret	27	27	25	23	25†	22	0
37	(Russia) Victoria Blokhina		21	19	22	21	23	22	22	23	23	21	28	Ret	23	24	26	25					0
38	(United Arab Emirates) Kyle Kumaran																		24	22	23	19	0
39	(Belgium) Jef Machiels										22	23	26	24	24	23	28	28	21	Ret	24	21	0
40	(India) Ruhaan Alva														21	DSQ	24	23					0
Trophy Round-only drivers
	(United Arab Emirates) Hamda Al Qubaisi	6																					
	(Netherlands) Dilano van 't Hoff	Ret																					
Pos	Driver	YMC TR	R1	R2	R3	R4	R1	R2	R3	R4	R1	R2	R3	R4	R1	R2	R3	R4	R1	R2	R3	R4	Pts
Pos	Driver	YMC TR	YMC1				DUB1				DUB2				DUB3				YMC2				Pts

Colour	Result
Gold	Winner
Silver	Second place
Bronze	Third place
Green	Points classification
Blue	Non-points classification
Blue	Non-classified finish (NC)
Purple	Retired, not classified (Ret)
Red	Did not qualify (DNQ)
Red	Did not pre-qualify (DNPQ)
Black	Disqualified (DSQ)
White	Did not start (DNS)
White	Withdrew (WD)
White	Race cancelled (C)
Blank	Did not practice (DNP)
Blank	Did not arrive (DNA)
Blank	Excluded (EX)

**Bold** – Pole
Italics – Fastest Lap
† — Did not finish, but classified

=== Rookies' Championship ===
Pos	Driver	YMC TR	YMC1				DUB1				DUB2				DUB3				YMC2				Pts
Pos	Driver	YMC TR	R1	R2	R3	R4	R1	R2	R3	R4	R1	R2	R3	R4	R1	R2	R3	R4	R1	R2	R3	R4	Pts
1	(Brazil) Rafael Câmara						17	12	9	3	1	4	1	7	1	1	9	1	1	2	Ret	24	303
2	(Australia) James Wharton		3	5	24	9	1	1	1	6					8	11	10	4	Ret	14	4	1	279
3	(Norway) Martinius Stenshorne		7	Ret	25‡	16	5	DNS	12	2	5	Ret	9	4	6	8	13	17	Ret	9	14	11	240
4	(Portugal) Ivan Domingues		17	12	12	11	22	20	13	20	9	25	13	10	7	17	3	Ret	26	11	3	Ret	227
5	(Mexico) Ricardo Escotto		13	16	14	15	18	16	23	18	14	Ret	14	14	16	18	19	11	17	Ret	16	25	160
6	(Singapore) Nikhil Bohra		15	25‡	Ret	14	14	17	14	25	Ret	7	16	12	Ret	26	29	24	14	18	10	5	152
7	(South Korea) Michael Shin		18	18	20	13	24	18	28	14	Ret	26	Ret	15	20	21	18	22	12	19	15	20	120
8	(Singapore) Christian Ho										10	24	5	27†	12	10	16	10	20	16	11	Ret	108
9	(Italy) Brando Badoer		Ret	23†	17	23	20	Ret	25	12	25	14	15	25	13	14	14	16					96
10	(Thailand) Nandhavud Bhirombhakdi		20	22	21	17	19	23	20	26	28†	19	24	Ret	Ret	22	20	Ret	18	15	22	16	93
11	(Italy) Valerio Rinicella										Ret	Ret	11	18	14	15	Ret	13	15	17	Ret	17	70
12	(Russia) Victoria Blokhina		21	19	22	21	23	22	22	23	23	21	28	Ret	23	24	26	25					47
13	(Uzbekistan) Ismoilkhuja Akhmedkhodjaev		23	21	19	20	26	24	29†	Ret	24	20	27	23	26	Ret	27	27	25	23	25†	22	45
14	(Belgium) Jules Castro		19	26‡	13	22	21	21	27	27†													37
15	(Belgium) Jef Machiels										22	23	26	24	24	23	28	28	21	Ret	24	21	26
16	(United Arab Emirates) Kyle Kumaran																		24	22	23	19	13
17	(India) Ruhaan Alva														21	DSQ	24	23					4
Pos	Driver	YMC TR	R1	R2	R3	R4	R1	R2	R3	R4	R1	R2	R3	R4	R1	R2	R3	R4	R1	R2	R3	R4	Pts
Pos	Driver	YMC TR	YMC1				DUB1				DUB2				DUB3				YMC2				Pts

Colour	Result
Gold	Winner
Silver	Second place
Bronze	Third place
Green	Points classification
Blue	Non-points classification
Blue	Non-classified finish (NC)
Purple	Retired, not classified (Ret)
Red	Did not qualify (DNQ)
Red	Did not pre-qualify (DNPQ)
Black	Disqualified (DSQ)
White	Did not start (DNS)
White	Withdrew (WD)
White	Race cancelled (C)
Blank	Did not practice (DNP)
Blank	Did not arrive (DNA)
Blank	Excluded (EX)

† — Did not finish, but classified
‡ — Classified only in the rookies'

=== Teams' Championship ===
Ahead of each event, the teams nominate two drivers that accumulate teams' points.

Pos	Team	Points
1	(Italy) Prema Racing	550
2	(United Arab Emirates) Abu Dhabi Racing by Prema	385
3	(Germany) PHM Racing	278
4	(United Kingdom) Hitech GP	273
5	(Netherlands) MP Motorsport	224
6	(United Arab Emirates) Xcel Motorsport	90
7	(United Arab Emirates) 3Y by R-ace GP	89
8	(Spain) GRS Team	18
9	(San Marino) AKM Motorsport	10
10	(Italy) Cram – Hitech GP	0
11	(United Kingdom) JHR Developments	0
12	(Republic of Ireland) Pinnacle Motorsport	0
