= 2021 Formula 4 UAE Championship =

Motor racing competition

The 2021 Formula 4 UAE Championship was the fifth season of the Formula 4 UAE Championship, a motor racing series for the United Arab Emirates regulated according to FIA Formula 4 regulations, and organised and promoted by the Emirates Motorsport Organization (EMSO) – formerly known as Automobile & Touring Club of the UAE (ATCUAE) and AUH Motorsports. This was the last season that used Tatuus F4-T014 chassis.

The season commenced on 13 January at Dubai Autodrome and concluded on 13 February at the same venue.

== Teams and drivers ==
Team	No.	Drivers	Class	Rounds
(United Arab Emirates) 3Y Technology	3	(Saudi Arabia) Saud al Saud	R	1–3
(United Arab Emirates) Xcel Motorsport	7	(Russia) Kirill Smal		All
(United Arab Emirates) Xcel Motorsport	8	(Peru) Matías Zagazeta		1–2
(United Arab Emirates) Xcel Motorsport	13	(Spain) Pepe Martí	R	All
(United Arab Emirates) Xcel Motorsport	14	(Thailand) Tasanapol Inthraphuvasak	R	All
(United Arab Emirates) Xcel Motorsport	15	(Russia) Nikita Bedrin	R	1–3
(United Arab Emirates) Xcel Motorsport	17	(Netherlands) Dilano van 't Hoff	R	All
(United Arab Emirates) Xcel Motorsport	23	(Ukraine) Oleksandr Partyshev	R	All
(United Arab Emirates) Xcel Motorsport	24	(United Arab Emirates) Jamie Day	R	All
(United Arab Emirates) Xcel Motorsport	75	(France) Noam Abramczyk	R	3–4
(Germany) BWT Mücke Motorsport	28	(Italy) Francesco Braschi	R	1, 3
(Germany) BWT Mücke Motorsport	69	(Russia) Vladislav Lomko		5
(Germany) BWT Mücke Motorsport	77	(Germany) Jonas Ried	R	All
(Italy) Cram Durango	29	(United States) Enzo Scionti	R	All
(Italy) Cram Durango	34	(Italy) Enzo Trulli	R	All
(United Arab Emirates) Abu Dhabi Racing by Prema	88	(United Arab Emirates) Hamda Al Qubaisi		All

== Race calendar ==
The schedule announced on 7 September 2020 consisted of 20 races over 5 rounds. All rounds will be held in the United Arab Emirates. The final round scheduled to take place on 4–6 March was anticipated to 28–30 January.

Round		Circuit	Date	Pole position	Fastest lap	Winning driver	Winning team	Supporting
1	R1	Dubai Autodrome, Dubai (Grand Prix Circuit)	14 January	(Netherlands) Dilano van 't Hoff	(Italy) Enzo Trulli	(Italy) Enzo Trulli	(Italy) Cram Durango	Dubai 24 Hour
1	R2	Dubai Autodrome, Dubai (Grand Prix Circuit)	14 January	(Netherlands) Dilano van 't Hoff	(Netherlands) Dilano van 't Hoff	(Netherlands) Dilano van 't Hoff	(United Arab Emirates) Xcel Motorsport	Dubai 24 Hour
1	R3	Dubai Autodrome, Dubai (Grand Prix Circuit)	15 January	(Netherlands) Dilano van 't Hoff	(Netherlands) Dilano van 't Hoff	(Netherlands) Dilano van 't Hoff	(United Arab Emirates) Xcel Motorsport	Dubai 24 Hour
1	R4	Dubai Autodrome, Dubai (Grand Prix Circuit)	15 January		(Netherlands) Dilano van 't Hoff	(Russia) Kirill Smal	(United Arab Emirates) Xcel Motorsport	Dubai 24 Hour
2	R1	Yas Marina Circuit, Abu Dhabi (Grand Prix Circuit)	22 January	(Netherlands) Dilano van 't Hoff	(Netherlands) Dilano van 't Hoff	(Italy) Enzo Trulli	(Italy) Cram Durango	Abu Dhabi 6 Hour; Gulf Radical Cup
2	R2	Yas Marina Circuit, Abu Dhabi (Grand Prix Circuit)	22 January	(Netherlands) Dilano van 't Hoff	(Italy) Enzo Trulli	(Netherlands) Dilano van 't Hoff	(United Arab Emirates) Xcel Motorsport	Abu Dhabi 6 Hour; Gulf Radical Cup
2	R3	Yas Marina Circuit, Abu Dhabi (Grand Prix Circuit)	23 January	(Netherlands) Dilano van 't Hoff	(Netherlands) Dilano van 't Hoff	(Netherlands) Dilano van 't Hoff	(United Arab Emirates) Xcel Motorsport	Abu Dhabi 6 Hour; Gulf Radical Cup
2	R4	Yas Marina Circuit, Abu Dhabi (Grand Prix Circuit)	23 January		(Russia) Kirill Smal	(United Arab Emirates) Hamda Al Qubaisi	(United Arab Emirates) Abu Dhabi Racing by Prema	Abu Dhabi 6 Hour; Gulf Radical Cup
3	R1	Dubai Autodrome, Dubai (International Circuit)	29 January	(Netherlands) Dilano van 't Hoff	(Netherlands) Dilano van 't Hoff	(Netherlands) Dilano van 't Hoff	(United Arab Emirates) Xcel Motorsport	F3 Asian Championship; Waleed Alshemais National Sportsbike Championship; Gulf Radical Cup; UAE Touring Car Championship
3	R2	Dubai Autodrome, Dubai (International Circuit)	30 January	(Netherlands) Dilano van 't Hoff	(Italy) Enzo Trulli	(Italy) Enzo Trulli	(Italy) Cram Durango	F3 Asian Championship; Waleed Alshemais National Sportsbike Championship; Gulf Radical Cup; UAE Touring Car Championship
3	R3	Dubai Autodrome, Dubai (International Circuit)	30 January	(Netherlands) Dilano van 't Hoff	(United Arab Emirates) Hamda Al Qubaisi	(Russia) Kirill Smal	(United Arab Emirates) Xcel Motorsport	F3 Asian Championship; Waleed Alshemais National Sportsbike Championship; Gulf Radical Cup; UAE Touring Car Championship
3	R4	Dubai Autodrome, Dubai (International Circuit)	30 January		(Italy) Francesco Braschi	(Russia) Kirill Smal	(United Arab Emirates) Xcel Motorsport	F3 Asian Championship; Waleed Alshemais National Sportsbike Championship; Gulf Radical Cup; UAE Touring Car Championship
4	R1	Yas Marina Circuit, Abu Dhabi (Corkscrew Circuit)	5 February	(Netherlands) Dilano van 't Hoff	(Italy) Enzo Trulli	(Italy) Enzo Trulli	(Italy) Cram Durango	F3 Asian Championship
4	R2	Yas Marina Circuit, Abu Dhabi (Corkscrew Circuit)	6 February	(Spain) Pepe Martí (Note: Al Qubaisi received a 3 place grid penalty for causing an avoidable collision in Race 1. Pepe Martí was promoted to the pole position.)	(Italy) Enzo Trulli	(Spain) Pepe Martí	(United Arab Emirates) Xcel Motorsport	F3 Asian Championship
4	R3	Yas Marina Circuit, Abu Dhabi (Corkscrew Circuit)	6 February	(Netherlands) Dilano van 't Hoff	(Netherlands) Dilano van 't Hoff	(United Arab Emirates) Hamda Al Qubaisi	(United Arab Emirates) Abu Dhabi Racing by Prema	F3 Asian Championship
4	R4	Yas Marina Circuit, Abu Dhabi (Corkscrew Circuit)	6 February		(Russia) Kirill Smal	(United Arab Emirates) Jamie Day	(United Arab Emirates) Xcel Motorsport	F3 Asian Championship
5	R1	Dubai Autodrome, Dubai (Grand Prix Circuit)	12 February	(Russia) Vladislav Lomko	(United Arab Emirates) Hamda Al Qubaisi	(United Arab Emirates) Hamda Al Qubaisi	(United Arab Emirates) Abu Dhabi Racing by Prema	Asian Le Mans Series; F3 Asian Championship; Waleed Alshemais National Sportsbike Championship; Gulf Radical Cup
5	R2	Dubai Autodrome, Dubai (Grand Prix Circuit)	12 February	(Netherlands) Dilano van 't Hoff	(Netherlands) Dilano van 't Hoff	(Russia) Vladislav Lomko	(Germany) BWT Mücke Motorsport	Asian Le Mans Series; F3 Asian Championship; Waleed Alshemais National Sportsbike Championship; Gulf Radical Cup
5	R3	Dubai Autodrome, Dubai (Grand Prix Circuit)	13 February	(Netherlands) Dilano van 't Hoff	(Netherlands) Dilano van 't Hoff	(Russia) Vladislav Lomko	(Germany) BWT Mücke Motorsport	Asian Le Mans Series; F3 Asian Championship; Waleed Alshemais National Sportsbike Championship; Gulf Radical Cup
5	R4	Dubai Autodrome, Dubai (Grand Prix Circuit)	13 February		(Netherlands) Dilano van 't Hoff	(Russia) Kirill Smal	(United Arab Emirates) Xcel Motorsport	Asian Le Mans Series; F3 Asian Championship; Waleed Alshemais National Sportsbike Championship; Gulf Radical Cup

== Championship standings ==
Points were awarded to the top 10 classified finishers in each race.

Position	**1st**	**2nd**	**3rd**	**4th**	**5th**	**6th**	**7th**	**8th**	**9th**	**10th**	**FL**
Points	25	18	15	12	10	8	6	4	2	1	1

=== Drivers' Championship ===
Pos	Driver	DUB1				YMC1				DUB2				YMC2				DUB3				Pts
Pos	Driver	R1	R2	R3	R4	R1	R2	R3	R4	R1	R2	R3	R4	R1	R2	R3	R4	R1	R2	R3	R4	Pts
1	(Italy) Enzo Trulli	1	6	8	2	1	2	2	4	2	1	2	4	1	2	3	5	2	DNS	4	3	319
2	(Netherlands) Dilano van 't Hoff	**2**	**1**	**1**	4	**2**	**1**	**1**	5	**1**	**5**	**3**	3	**4**	3	**2**	DSQ	8	**7**	**2**	4	318
3	(Russia) Kirill Smal	4	3	3	1	9	5	Ret	2	3	3	1	1	2	5	8	4	3	2	6	1	289
4	(United Arab Emirates) Hamda Al Qubaisi	3	5	2	6	5	3	5	1	Ret	4	4	DNS	Ret	4	1	8	1	9	3	10	221
5	(Thailand) Tasanapol Inthraphuvasak	7	8	6	3	6	7	7	3	4	7	9	6	6	Ret	10	2	4	6	10	5	154
6	(United Arab Emirates) Jamie Day	12	4	4	Ret	4	Ret	6	9	7	Ret	11	5	5	9	5	1	9	3	5	7	142
7	(Spain) Pepe Martí	Ret	DNS	Ret	Ret	3	4	11	8	6	2	5	8	3	**1**	4	Ret	Ret	4	11	Ret	135
8	(Italy) Francesco Braschi	5	2	5	7					11	6	7	2									77
9	(Germany) Jonas Ried	9	9	12	8	Ret	10	9	10	10	10	8	9	8	8	7	3	Ret	8	7	2	77
10	(Ukraine) Oleksandr Partyshev	10	12	10	Ret	10	8	8	7	8	8	6	7	10	7	11	9	7	5	8	8	72
11	(Russia) Nikita Bedrin	8	7	7	5	8	6	3	6	5	WD	WD	WD									71
12	(Russia) Vladislav Lomko																	**6**	1	1	6	66
13	(United States) Enzo Scionti	11	10	Ret	11	Ret	Ret	10	11	9	9	12	11	7	10	6	6	5	Ret	9	9	43
14	(Peru) Matías Zagazeta	6	11	9	9	7	9	4	12													32
15	(France) Noam Abramczyk									12	11	10	10	9	6	9	7					20
16	(Saudi Arabia) Saud al Saud	Ret	DNS	11	10	Ret	DNS	12	13	13	12	13	12									1
Pos	Driver	R1	R2	R3	R4	R1	R2	R3	R4	R1	R2	R3	R4	R1	R2	R3	R4	R1	R2	R3	R4	Pts
Pos	Driver	DUB1				YMC1				DUB2				YMC2				DUB3				Pts

Colour	Result
Gold	Winner
Silver	Second place
Bronze	Third place
Green	Points classification
Blue	Non-points classification
Blue	Non-classified finish (NC)
Purple	Retired, not classified (Ret)
Red	Did not qualify (DNQ)
Red	Did not pre-qualify (DNPQ)
Black	Disqualified (DSQ)
White	Did not start (DNS)
White	Withdrew (WD)
White	Race cancelled (C)
Blank	Did not practice (DNP)
Blank	Did not arrive (DNA)
Blank	Excluded (EX)

**Bold** – Pole
Italics – Fastest Lap
† — Did not finish, but classified

=== Teams' Championship ===
Ahead of each event, the teams nominate two drivers that accumulate teams' points.

Pos	Team	Points
1	(United Arab Emirates) Xcel Motorsport	1233
2	(Italy) Cram Durango	362
3	(United Arab Emirates) Abu Dhabi Racing by Prema	221
4	(Germany) BWT Mücke Motorsport	220
5	(United Arab Emirates) 3Y Technology	1
