= Lola Lovinfosse =

French racing driver (born 2005)

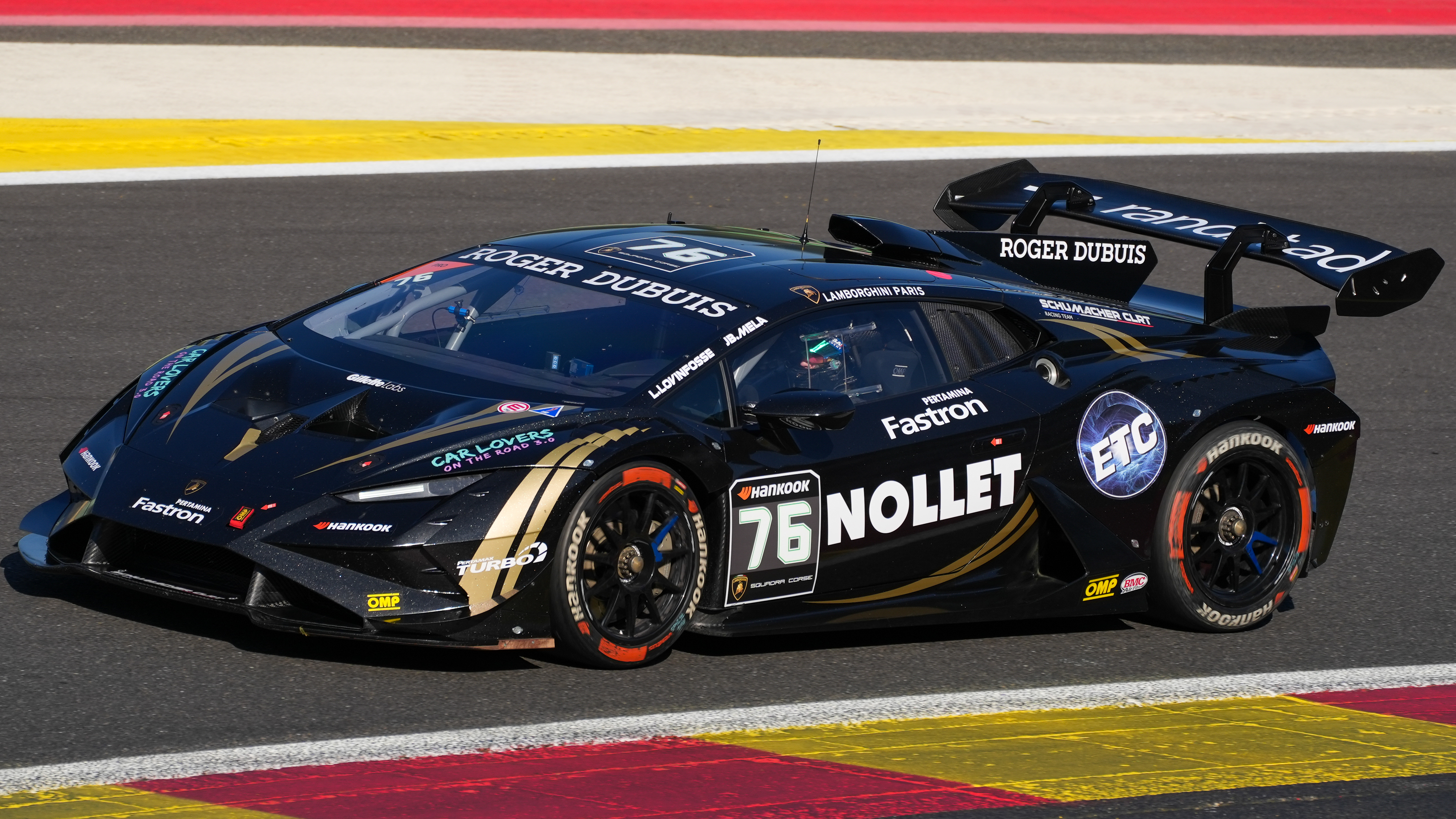
- Nationality: French
- Born: 17 October 2005 (age 21) Rouen, France

F1 Academy
- Years active: 2023–2024
- Car number: 3
- Former teams: Campos Racing, Rodin Motorsport
- Starts: 35
- Wins: 0
- Podiums: 3
- Poles: 0
- Fastest laps: 0
- Best finish: 10th in 2023

Previous series
- 2023–2024; 2023; 2022; 2021–2022: F1 Academy; Formula Winter Series; Indian Racing League; F4 Spanish

Lola Lovinfosse (French pronunciation: [lɔ.la lɔ.vɛ̃.fos]; born 17 October 2005) is a French former racing driver who competed in Lamborghini Super Trofeo Europe for Leipert Motorsport. She previously competed in F1 Academy for Campos and Rodin with support from Charlotte Tilbury Beauty Products.

== Career ==
=== Karting ===
Lovinfosse began her karting career in 2018, competing in the X30 Junior class of the IAME Winter Cup. In 2019 she competed in the OK Junior category and competed in the World and European Championships, the WSK Euro Series and the WSK Champions Cup, among others. Her best result that year was eighth place in the Andrea Margutti Trophy. In 2020 she rode in the OK class in the World and European Championships, the WSK Super Master Series and the WSK Champions Cup.

=== Formula 4 ===
In 2021, Lovinfosse moved to formula racing, where she competed for the Drivex School team in the F4 Spanish Championship. She had a difficult season, in which a thirteenth place at the Autódromo Internacional do Algarve was her best result. She finished in 23rd place in the rookie standings with one point. She also qualified for the Female Trophy, along with Emely de Heus. In this class, she won 13 of the 21 races, but due to a number of retirements she still finished behind de Heus.

From 31 January to 4 February 2022, Lovinfosse competed in a W Series test in Arizona, United States along with 14 other prospective drivers. Also in 2022, Lovinfosse remained in Spanish F4. She was originally supposed to drive for GRS Racing, but shortly before the start of the season she switched to Teo Martín Motorsport. She was again unable to score: two nineteenth places at the Circuito Permanente de Jerez and the Circuit Ricardo Tormo Valencia were her best results. She left the class after four of the seven weekends. She again scored no points and finished in 37th place in the standings. She won the Female Trophy, even though the races at Spa were the only ones that counted towards points, as the addition of Aurelia Nobels meant it was the only weekend with multiple female drivers.

=== F1 Academy ===
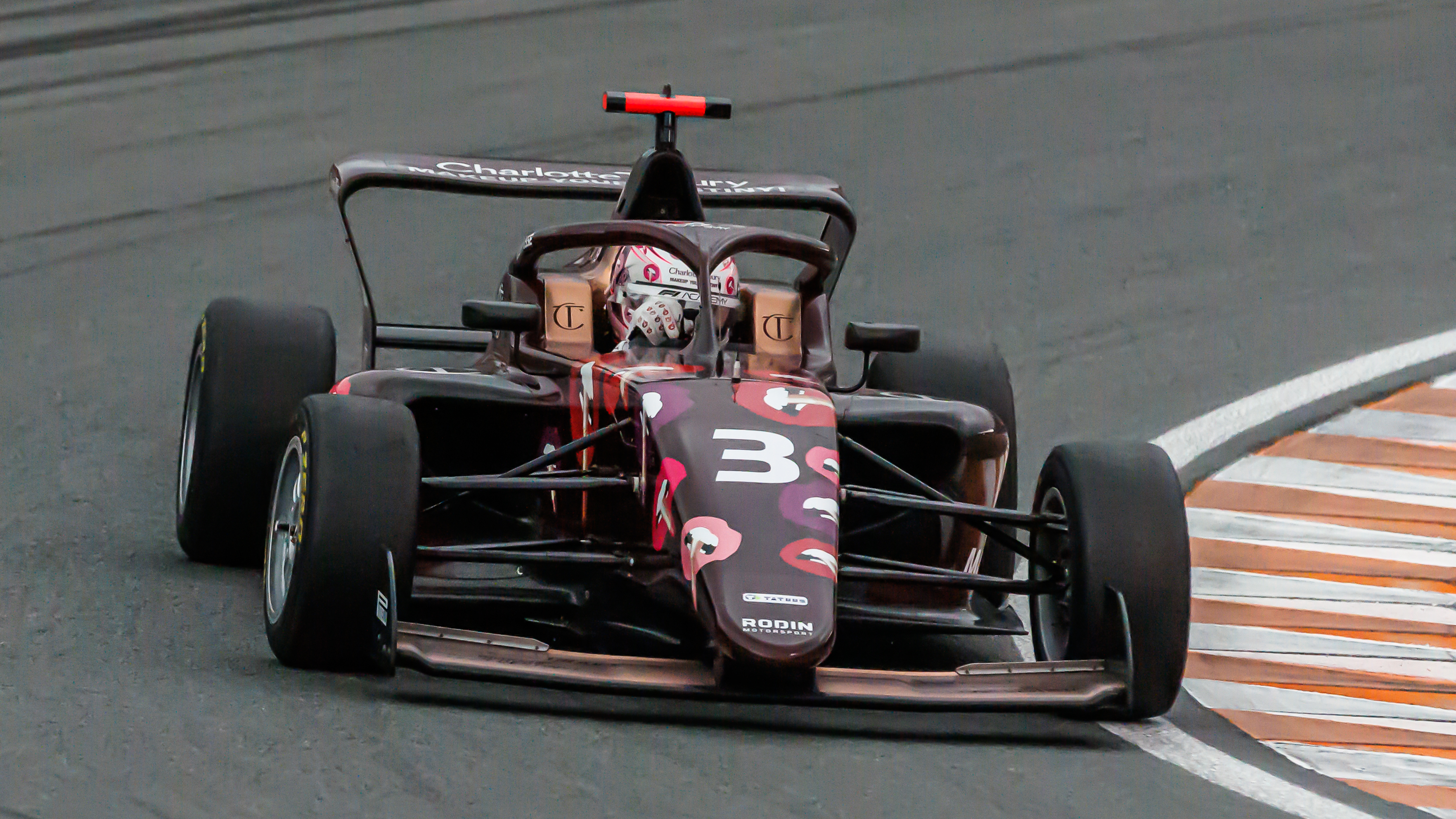
Lovinfosse competing in an F1 Academy race at Zandvoort in 2024.

Lovinfosse switched to F1 Academy in 2023, a new series for women organized by Formula One, where she drove for Campos Racing. In 2024, she moved to Rodin Motorsport and is supported by Charlotte Tilbury.

=== GT racing ===
Lovinfosse joined Schumacher CLRT for the 2024 Lamborghini Super Trofeo Europe season. She missed the second round due to a fractured wrist from the F1 Academy race in Miami. In July, Lamborghini Squadra Corse announced Lovinfosse was one of 28 drivers selected for the 2024 Super Trofeo Junior Driver Program. In the fourth round of the championship she switched from the Pro class to the Pro-Am class, earning her first podium in the series with a third place finish.

In 2025, Lovinfosse returned to the Lamborghini Super Trofeo Europe series, competing for Leipert Motorsport alongside Pablo Schumm in the Pro class. Lovinfosse retired from racing after 2025 in an announcement on Instagram.

== Racing record ==
=== Career summary ===
Season	Series	Team	Races	Wins	Poles	F/Laps	Podiums	Points	Position
2021	F4 Spanish Championship	Drivex School	21	0	0	0	0	0	27th
2022	F4 Spanish Championship	Teo Martín Motorsport	12	0	0	0	0	0	37th
2022	Indian Racing League	Hyderabad Blackbirds	4	0	0	0	1	13.5	23rd
2023	Formula Winter Series	Campos Racing	2	0	0	0	0	4	18th
2023	F1 Academy	Campos Racing	21	0	0	0	3	65	10th
2024	F1 Academy	Rodin Motorsport	14	0	0	0	0	19	14th
2024	Lamborghini Super Trofeo Europe - Pro	Schumacher CLRT	8	0	0	0	1	23	13th
2025	Lamborghini Super Trofeo Europe - Pro	Leipert Motorsport	2	0	0	0	0	1	20th

=== Complete F4 Spanish Championship results ===
(key) (Races in bold indicate pole position) (Races in italics indicate fastest lap)

Year	Team	1	2	3	4	5	6	7	8	9	10	11	12	13	14	15	16	17	18	19	20	21	DC	Points
2021	Drivex School	SPA; 1; 23	SPA; 2; 21	SPA; 3; 22	NAV; 1; 20	NAV; 2; 21	NAV; 3; 17	ALG; 1; 17	ALG; 2; 17	ALG; 3; 13	ARA; 1; 18	ARA; 2; 18	ARA; 3; 16	CRT; 1 Ret	CRT; 2; 17	CRT; 3; 17	JER; 1; 19	JER; 2; 17	JER; 3 Ret	CAT; 1 Ret	CAT; 2; 20	CAT; 3; 20	29th	0
2022	Teo Martín Motorsport	ALG; 1; 28†	ALG; 2; 22	ALG; 3; 25	JER; 1; 19	JER; 2; 23	JER; 3; 21	CRT; 1; 22	CRT; 2; 19	CRT; 3 Ret	SPA; 1; 21	SPA; 2; 22	SPA; 3; 20	ARA; 1	ARA; 2	ARA; 3	NAV; 1	NAV; 2	NAV; 3	CAT; 1	CAT; 2	CAT; 3	37th	0

=== Complete Indian Racing League results ===
(key) (Races in bold indicate pole position) (Races in italics indicate fastest lap)

Year	Franchise	1	2	3	4	5	6	7	8	9	10	11	12	Pos.	Pts
2022	Hyderabad Blackbirds	HYD1; 1 C	HYD1; 2 C	HYD1; 3 C	IRU1; 1; 7	IRU1; 2	IRU1; 3 Ret	IRU2; 1; 3	IRU2; 2	IRU2; 3 Ret	HYD2; 1 WD	HYD2; 2	HYD2; 3 WD	23rd	13.5

=== Complete Formula Winter Series results ===
(key) (Races in bold indicate pole position; races in italics indicate fastest lap)

Year	Team	1	2	3	4	5	6	7	8	DC	Points
2023	Campos Racing	JER; 1	JER; 2	CRT; 1	CRT; 2	NAV; 1	NAV; 2	CAT; 2 Ret	CAT; 2; 8	18th	4

=== Complete F1 Academy results ===
(key) (Races in bold indicate pole position; races in italics indicate fastest lap)

Year	Team	1	2	3	4	5	6	7	8	9	10	11	12	13	14	15	16	17	18	19	20	21	DC	Points
2023	Campos Racing	RBR; 1; 9	RBR; 2; 3	RBR; 3; 13	CRT; 1; 10	CRT; 2; 8	CRT; 3 Ret	CAT; 1; 8	CAT; 2; 9	CAT; 3; 5	ZAN; 1; 9	ZAN; 2; 11	ZAN; 3 Ret	MNZ; 1; 10	MNZ; 2; 13†	MNZ; 3; 7	LEC; 1; 3	LEC; 2 Ret	LEC; 3; 3	COA; 1; 10	COA; 2; 8	COA; 3; 15	10th	65
2024	Rodin Motorsport	JED; 1; 8	JED; 2 Ret	MIA; 1; 10	MIA; 2; 15	CAT; 1; 11	CAT; 2; 9	ZAN; 1; 13	ZAN; 2; 7	SIN; 1; 11	SIN; 2; 13	LSL; 1; 14	LSL; 2 C	YMC; 1; 13	YMC; 2 Ret	YMC; 3; 7							14th	19
