= Dilano van 't Hoff =

Dutch racing driver (2004–2023)

- Van 't Hoff in 2022
- Born: 26 July 2004; Dordrecht, South Holland, Netherlands
- Died: 1 July 2023 (aged 18); Circuit de Spa-Francorchamps, Stavelot, Belgium
- Cause of death: Injuries sustained at the 2023 Spa-Francorchamps Formula Regional round
- Nationality: (Netherlands) Dutch

Formula Regional European Championship career
- Years active: 2021–2023
- Teams: MP Motorsport
- Starts: 27
- Wins: 0
- Podiums: 1
- Poles: 0
- Fastest laps: 0
- Best finish: 19th in 2022

Previous series
- 2022; 2021; 2021: FR Asian; F4 Spanish; F4 UAE

Championship titles
- 2021: F4 Spanish

Dilano van 't Hoff (Dutch: [diˈlaːnoː vɑn (ə)t ˈɦɔf]; 26 July 2004 – 1 July 2023) was a Dutch racing driver who competed in the Formula Regional European Championship from 2021 to 2023.

Van 't Hoff won the F4 Spanish Championship in 2021 with MP Motorsport. He died in a multi-car collision in the 2023 Formula Regional European Championship round at Spa-Francorchamps.

== Racing career ==
=== Karting (2015–2020) ===
Van 't Hoff started his international karting career at the age of eleven, competing in the SKUSA SuperNationals. Van 't Hoff finished third in both the IAME Euro Series and IAME International Final in 2018, the same year in which he finished sixth in his first season of the European Championship. He ended the following year fifth in the same series, this time in the OK class, and won the Trofeo delle Industrie with Forza Racing.

=== Formula 4 (2021) ===
In 2021, van 't Hoff made his single-seater debut with Xcel Motorsport in the Formula 4 UAE Championship. His season started successfully, as, despite stalling at the start of the first race, van 't Hoff was able to come back to second in that race and would go on to win the following two races, having started both from pole position. Van 't Hoff was then able to extend his gap to his nearest rival Enzo Trulli by winning two more races at the next round at Yas Marina. After another win at round three in Dubai, van 't Hoff would lose his gap to Trulli thanks to a disqualification in the final race of the penultimate event, stripping him off another podium and more crucial points for the championship. He would go on to eventually lose out to Trulli by just one point in the final round.

For his main campaign, van 't Hoff joined MP Motorsport in the F4 Spanish Championship. His first two wins came at the first round of the series at the Circuit de Spa-Francorchamps, and van 't Hoff then went on a run of six podiums in a row, including three wins and a triple podium at Algarve. He scored his next victory in the sprint race at the Circuit Ricardo Tormo after original winner Daniel Maciá had been given a penalty for extending track limits, and followed this up with another podium in the third race. At the penultimate round of the season, van 't Hoff completed a hattrick of poles and race wins, thus winning the championship.

=== Formula Regional European (2021–2023) ===
==== 2021 ====
In September 2021, van 't Hoff made his debut in the Formula Regional European Championship, racing for MP Motorsport on the Circuit Ricardo Tormo as a guest driver.

==== 2022 ====
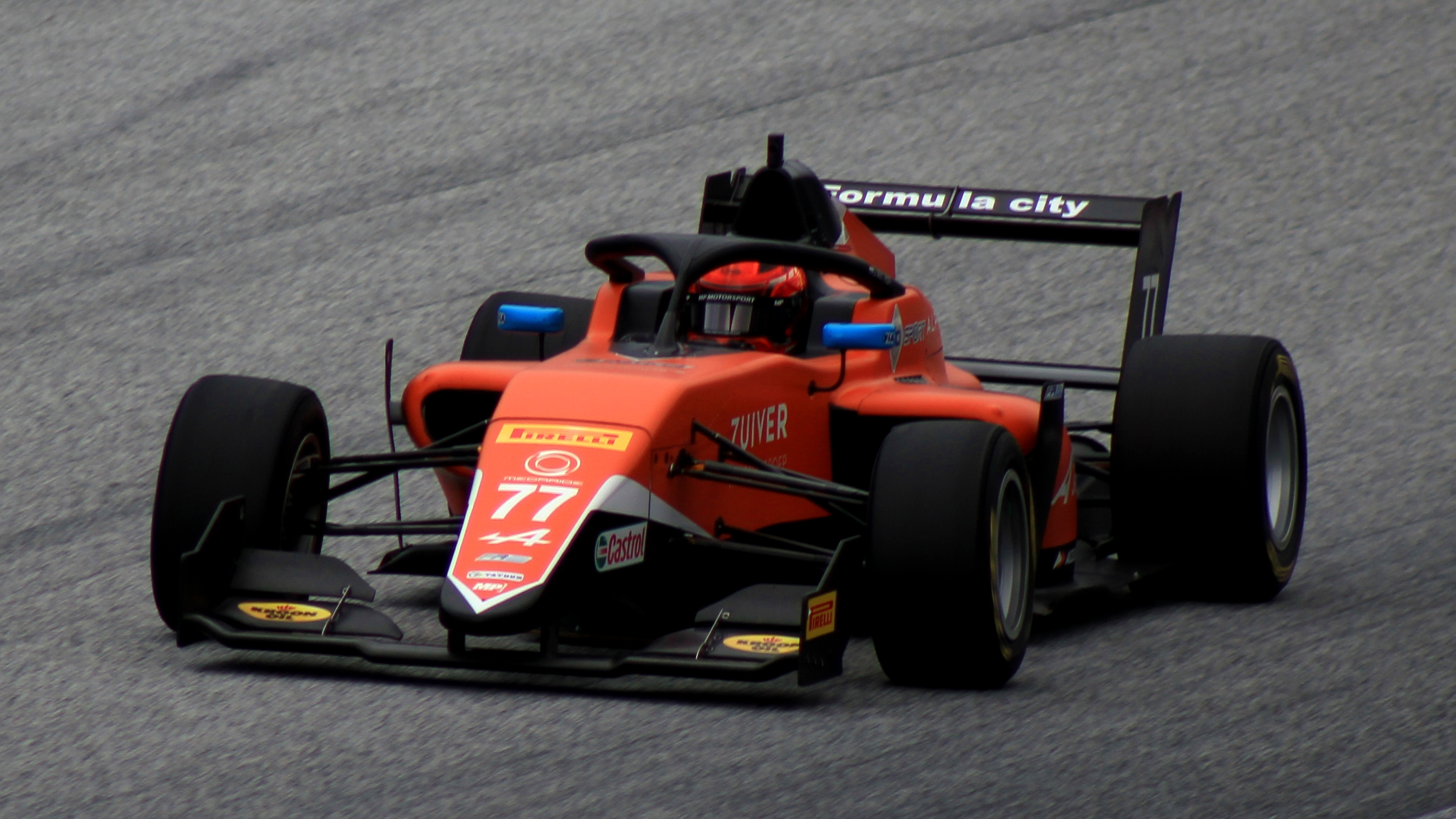
Van 't Hoff racing in the 2022 Formula Regional European Championship at the Red Bull Ring

For 2022, van 't Hoff competed in the Formula Regional European Championship for the full season with MP Motorsport. A shoulder injury forced him to undergo an operation during the season, causing van 't Hoff to miss several weekends. When he returned, he managed to score a podium at Barcelona, which helped him to 19th in the standings. It would later be revealed that van 't Hoff had been driving the car effectively one-handed, as the original surgery had caused complications, with a loose plate and broken screws forcing him to undergo a second surgery during the winter.

==== 2023 ====
Van 't Hoff returned to FRECA with MP Motorsport for the 2023 season. Before the Spa weekend, van 't Hoff had scored two points finishes, taking a best result of seventh at Imola.

== Death ==
On 1 July 2023, van 't Hoff died in a multi-car crash in a Formula Regional European Championship (FRECA) race at Spa-Francorchamps in heavy rain. The multi-car crash, which occurred at the exit of Raidillon, just before the Kemmel straight, also involved Joshua Dufek, Adam Fitzgerald, Enzo Scionti, and Tim Tramnitz.

Van 't Hoff lost control entering the Kemmel straight, before being struck on the side by Fitzgerald's car. A minute of silence was observed at the 24 Hours of Spa race that weekend, along with the coinciding Austrian Grand Prix. Many people in the motorsport community paid respect to van 't Hoff.

Lance Stroll said that the accident was unnecessary and called for changes to the Spa-Francorchamps circuit, referencing the fatal accident of Anthoine Hubert at the same corner in 2019. Max Verstappen joined him in calling the accident "sad and unnecessary" but stopped short of blaming the circuit's design, saying "it is easy to blame the track but looking at how wet it was and these kind of things we have to look at it for the future to look at what we can do better to protect drivers".

== Karting record ==
=== Karting career summary ===
Season	Series	Team	Position
2015	SKUSA SuperNationals — TaG Cadet	CRG Nordam	54th
2016	WSK Champions Cup — 60 Mini	WJS Racing	NC
2016	WSK Super Master Series — 60 Mini	Gamoto SNC	NC
2016	SKUSA SuperNationals — Mini Swift	Team Benik Kart	32nd
2017	WSK Champions Cup — OK-J	Alexander van 't Hoff	27th
2017	IAME Euro Series — X30 Junior	Alexander van 't Hoff	7th
2017	KNAF Cup Benelux Open — X30 Junior	WJS Racing	3rd
2017	IAME International Final — X30 Junior	Alexander van 't Hoff	15th
2017	WSK Final Cup — OK-J	Forza Racing	NC
2018	WSK Champions Cup — OK-J	Forza Racing	31st
2018	South Garda Winter Cup — OK-J	Forza Racing	29th
2018	IAME Euro Series — X30 Junior	Fusion Motorsport	3rd
2018	WSK Super Master Series — OK-J	Forza Racing	38th
2018	CIK-FIA European Championship — OK-J	Forza Racing	6th
2018	Deutsche Kart-Meisterschaft — OK-J	Forza Racing	30th
2018	CIK-FIA World Championship — OK-J	Forza Racing	18th
2018	IAME International Final — X30 Junior	Fusion Motorsport	3rd
2018	WSK Final Cup — OK-J	Forza Racing	13th
2018	WSK Final Cup — OK	Forza Racing	13th
2019	WSK Champions Cup — OK	Forza Racing	5th
2019	South Garda Winter Cup — OK	Forza Racing	16th
2019	WSK Super Master Series — OK	Forza Racing	10th
2019	Italian Championship — OK	Forza Racing	6th
2019	WSK Euro Series — OK	Forza Racing	5th
2019	French Championship — OK	Forza Racing	10th
2019	CIK-FIA European Championship — OK	Forza Racing	5th
2019	CIK-FIA World Championship — OK	Forza Racing	32nd
2019	Trofeo delle Industrie — OK	Forza Racing	1st
2019	WSK Open Cup — OK	Forza Racing	4th
2019	WSK Final Cup — OK	Forza Racing	7th
2020	WSK Champions Cup — OK	Forza Racing	NC
2020	South Garda Winter Cup — OK	Forza Racing	17th
2020	WSK Super Master Series — OK	Forza Racing	10th
2020	CIK-FIA European Championship — OK	Forza Racing	16th
2020	Italian Championship — OK	Forza Racing	8th
2020	WSK Euro Series — OK	Forza Racing	10th
2020	Champions of the Future — OK	Forza Racing	4th
2020	CIK-FIA World Championship — OK	Forza Racing	15th

=== Complete CIK-FIA results ===
==== Complete CIK-FIA Karting World Championship results ====
Year	Entrant	Class	Circuit	QH	F
2018	Forza Racing	OK-J	(Sweden) Kristianstad	13th	18th
2019	Forza Racing	OK	(Finland) Alahärmä	2nd	Ret (Note: Did not finish, but was classified 32nd.)
2020	Forza Racing	OK	(Portugal) Portimão	28th	15th

==== Complete CIK-FIA Karting European Championship results ====
(key) (Races in bold indicate pole position; races in italics indicate fastest lap)

Year	Entrant	Class	1	2	3	4	5	6	7	8	Pos	Points
2018	Forza Racing	OK-J	SAR; QH; 35	SAR; F DNQ	PFI; QH; 1	**PFI**; **F** 1	AMP; QH; 12	AMP; F 8	ESS; QH; 30	ESS; F Ret	6th	43
2019	Forza Racing	OK	ANG; QH; 4	ANG; F 5	GEN; QH; 5	GEN; F 11	KRI; QH; 38	KRI; F DNQ	LEM; QH; 16	LEM; F 8	5th	38
2020	Forza Racing	OK	ZUE; QH; 30	ZUE; F 17	SAR; QH; 10	SAR; F 8	WAC; QH; 17	WAC; F 15			16th	11

== Racing record ==
=== Racing career summary ===
Season	Series	Team	Races	Wins	Poles	F/Laps	Podiums	Points	Position
2021	Formula 4 UAE Championship	Xcel Motorsport	20	5	13	10	12	318	2nd
2021	F4 Spanish Championship	MP Motorsport	21	10	13	6	16	361	1st
2021	Formula Regional European Championship	MP Motorsport	6	0	0	0	0	—N/a	NC†
2021	Formula 4 UAE Championship – Trophy Round	MP Motorsport	1	0	0	0	0	—N/a	DNF
2022	Formula Regional Asian Championship	Pinnacle Motorsport	12	0	1	0	1	51	13th
2022	Formula Regional European Championship	MP Motorsport	13	0	0	0	1	16	19th
2023	Formula Regional European Championship	MP Motorsport	8	0	0	0	0	8	23rd

^{†} As Van 't Hoff was a guest driver, he was ineligible for championship points.

=== Complete Formula 4 UAE Championship results ===
(key) (Races in bold indicate pole position) (Races in italics indicate fastest lap)

Year	Team	1	2	3	4	5	6	7	8	9	10	11	12	13	14	15	16	17	18	19	20	Pos	Points
2021	Xcel Motorsport	**DUB1**; **1**; 2	**DUB1**; **2**; 1	**DUB1**; **3**; 1	DUB1; 4; 4	**YMC1**; **1**; 2	**YMC1**; **2**; 1	**YMC1**; **3**; 1	YMC1; 4; 5	**DUB2**; **1**; 1	**DUB2**; **2**; 5	**DUB2**; **3**; 3	DUB2; 4; 3	**YMC2**; **1**; 4	YMC2; 2; 3	**YMC2**; **3**; 2	YMC2; 4 DSQ	DUB3; 1; 8	**DUB3**; **2**; 7	**DUB3**; **3**; 2	DUB3; 4; 4	2nd	318

=== Complete F4 Spanish Championship results ===
(key) (Races in bold indicate pole position) (Races in italics indicate fastest lap)

Year	Team	1	2	3	4	5	6	7	8	9	10	11	12	13	14	15	16	17	18	19	20	21	Pos	Points
2021	MP Motorsport	SPA; 1; 1	**SPA**; **2**; 2	**SPA**; **3**; 1	**NAV**; **1**; 2	NAV; 2; 4	NAV; 3; 1	**ALG**; **1**; 3	**ALG**; **2**; 2	**ALG**; **3**; 1	**ARA**; **1**; 1	ARA; 2; 2	ARA; 3; 4	**CRT**; **1**; 20	**CRT**; **2**; 1	**CRT**; **3**; 2	**JER**; **1**; 1	**JER**; **2**; 1	**JER**; **3**; 1	CAT; 1; 1	CAT; 2; 13	CAT; 3 Ret	1st	361

=== Complete Formula Regional European Championship results ===
(key) (Races in bold indicate pole position) (Races in italics indicate fastest lap)

Year	Team	1	2	3	4	5	6	7	8	9	10	11	12	13	14	15	16	17	18	19	20	DC	Points
2021	MP Motorsport	IMO; 1	IMO; 2	CAT; 1	CAT; 2	MCO; 1	MCO; 2	LEC; 1	LEC; 2	ZAN; 1	ZAN; 2	SPA; 1	SPA; 2	RBR; 1	RBR; 2	VAL; 1; 20	VAL; 2 Ret	MUG; 1; 25	MUG; 2; 21	MNZ; 1; 24	MNZ; 2; 15	NC†	0
2022	MP Motorsport	MNZ; 1 Ret	MNZ; 2; 19	IMO; 1; 21	IMO; 2; 18	MCO; 1 DNQ	MCO; 2; 20	LEC; 1	LEC; 2	ZAN; 1 WD	ZAN; 2 WD	HUN; 1	HUN; 2	SPA; 1; 27	SPA; 2; 24	RBR; 1; 20	RBR; 2 Ret	CAT; 1; 3	CAT; 2 Ret	MUG; 1; 20	MUG; 2; 9	19th	17
2023	MP Motorsport	IMO; 1; 14	IMO; 2; 7	CAT; 1 Ret	CAT; 2; 22	HUN; 1; 23	HUN; 2; 9	SPA; 1; 30‡	SPA; 2; 19	MUG; 1	MUG; 2	LEC; 1	LEC; 2	RBR; 1	RBR; 2	MNZ; 1	MNZ; 2	ZAN; 1	ZAN; 2	HOC; 1	HOC; 2	23rd	8

^{†} As Van 't Hoff was a guest driver, he was ineligible to score points.
^{‡} Did not finish, but classified.

=== Complete Formula Regional Asian Championship results ===
(key) (Races in bold indicate pole position) (Races in italics indicate the fastest lap of top ten finishers)

Year	Entrant	1	2	3	4	5	6	7	8	9	10	11	12	13	14	15	DC	Points
2022	Pinnacle Motorsport	ABU; 1 DNS	ABU; 2 DNS	ABU; 3 DNS	DUB; 1; 7	DUB; 2 Ret	DUB; 3; 24†	DUB; 1; 7	DUB; 2; 6	**DUB**; **3**; 3	DUB; 1; 8	DUB; 2; 13	DUB; 3; 12	ABU; 1; 9	ABU; 2; 5	ABU; 3; 11	13th	51

^{†} Did not finish, but classified.

== Notes ==
Sporting positions
Preceded by Kas Haverkort	F4 Spanish Championship; Champion; 2021	Succeeded by Nikola Tsolov
