= 2022 FIA Motorsport Games Formula 4 Cup =

Motor race in France

Race details
Date	26–30 October
Official name	FIA Motorsport Games Formula 4 Cup
Location	Circuit Paul Ricard, France
Course	Permanent circuit 5.842 km (3.630 mi)
Distance	Qualifying; 20 minutes
- Qualifying Race

Pole
Driver	(Italy) Andrea Kimi Antonelli	Team Italy
Time	2:07.460

Fastest lap
Driver	(Italy) Andrea Kimi Antonelli	Team Italy
Time	2:08.816

Podium
First	(Italy) Andrea Kimi Antonelli	Team Italy
Second	(Portugal) Manuel Espírito Santo	Team Portugal
Third	(Switzerland) Dario Cabanelas	Team Switzerland
- Main race

Pole
Driver	(Italy) Andrea Kimi Antonelli	Team Italy

Fastest lap
Driver	(Italy) Andrea Kimi Antonelli	Team Italy
Time	2:07.002

Medalists
1st place, gold medalist(s)	(Italy) Andrea Kimi Antonelli	Team Italy
2nd place, silver medalist(s)	(Portugal) Manuel Espírito Santo	Team Portugal
3rd place, bronze medalist(s)	(Spain) Bruno del Pino	Team Spain

The 2022 FIA Motorsport Games Formula 4 Cup was the second FIA Motorsport Games Formula 4 Cup, to be held at Circuit Paul Ricard, France on 26 October to 30 October 2022. The race was contested with identical Formula 4 cars. The event was the part of the 2022 FIA Motorsport Games.

The event featured two 45-minute practice sessions on 28 October, with 20-minute Qualifying session on 29 October for the Qualifying race, while the Main race was held on 30 October.

== Entry list ==
All drivers utilized KCMG KC MG-01 cars, which were operated by Hitech GP. It was the first Formula 4 car to feature Halo safety device. Also, drivers will not only be chasing medals. KCMG will provide a €10,000 prize fund for the race winner.

Team	Entrant	No.	Drivers
Team Australia	CAMS	43	Costa Toparis
Team Austria	ÖAMTC	22	Charlie Wurz
Team Belgium	RACB	23	Lorens Lecertua
Team Brazil	CBA	5	Pedro Clerot
Team Chile	FADECH	15	María José Pérez
Team Chinese Taipei	CTMS	9	Ethan Ho
Team Denmark	DASU	7	Julius Dinesen
Team France	FFSA	17	Pablo Sarrazin
(Georgia (country)) Team Georgia	GASF	19	Sandro Tavartkiladze
Team Germany	DMSB	11	Valentin Kluss
Team Hong Kong	HKAA	20	Jasper Thong
Team Hungary	MNASZ	12	Zeno Kovacs
Team India	FMSCI	2	Ruhaan Alva
Team Italy	ACI	3	Andrea Kimi Antonelli
Team Malaysia	MAM	24	Alister Yoong
Team Mozambique	ATCM	16	Guilherme Rocha
Team Panama	AATDP	77	Valentino Mini
Team Portugal	FPAK	8	Manuel Espírito Santo
Team Serbia	AMSS	10	Filip Jenic
Team South Korea	KARA	18	Michael Shin
Team Spain	RFEDA	6	Bruno del Pino
Team Switzerland	ASS	4	Dario Cabanelas
Team Ukraine	FAU	14	Oleksandr Partyshev
Team Uzbekistan	NACU	1	Ismail Akhmedkhodjaev

== Results ==
=== Qualifying ===
Pos	No.	Driver	Team	Time	Gap	Grid
1	3	Andrea Kimi Antonelli	Team Italy	2:07.460	—	1
2	22	Charlie Wurz	Team Austria	2:08.141	+ 0.681	2
3	11	Valentin Kluss	Team Germany	2:08.208	+ 0.748	3
4	5	Pedro Clerot	Team Brazil	2:08.317	+ 0.857	4
5	8	Manuel Espírito Santo	Team Portugal	2:08.408	+ 0.948	5
6	10	Filip Jenic	Team Serbia	2:08.621	+ 1.161	6
7	4	Dario Cabanelas	Team Switzerland	2:08.724	+ 1.264	7
8	23	Lorens Lecertua	Team Belgium	2:08.901	+ 1.441	8
9	19	Sandro Tavartkiladze	(Georgia (country)) Team Georgia	2:08.949	+ 1.489	9
10	43	Costa Toparis	Team Australia	2:08.966	+ 1.506	10
11	6	Bruno del Pino	Team Spain	2:09.083	+ 1.623	11
12	17	Pablo Sarrazin	Team France	2:09.146	+ 1.686	12
13	18	Michael Shin	Team South Korea	2:09.418	+ 1.958	13
14	14	Oleksandr Partyshev	Team Ukraine	2:09.603	+ 2.143	24
15	24	Alister Yoong	Team Malaysia	2:09.703	+ 2.243	14
16	7	Julius Dinesen	Team Denmark	2:09.720	+ 2.260	15
17	9	Ethan Ho	Team Chinese Taipei	2:09.802	+ 2.342	16
18	2	Ruhaan Alva	Team India	2:09.980	+ 2.520	17
19	12	Zeno Kovacs	Team Hungary	2:10.155	+ 2.695	18
20	16	Guilherme Rocha	Team Mozambique	2:10.868	+ 3.408	19
21	1	Ismail Akhmedkhodjaev	Team Uzbekistan	2:11.218	+ 3.758	20
22	20	Jasper Thong	Team Hong Kong	2:11.344	+ 3.884	21
23	77	Valentino Mini	Team Panama	2:11.810	+ 4.350	23
24	15	María José Pérez	Team Chile	2:12.857	+ 5.397	22

=== Qualifying Race ===
Pos.	No.	Driver	Team	Laps	Time	Gap	Grid
1	3	Andrea Kimi Antonelli	Team Italy	10	23:00.001	—	1
2	8	Manuel Espírito Santo	Team Portugal	10	23:00.830	+ 0.829	5
3	4	Dario Cabanelas	Team Switzerland	10	23:02.246	+ 2.245	7
4	5	Pedro Clerot	Team Brazil	10	23:03.029	+ 3.028	4
5	6	Bruno del Pino	Team Spain	10	23:04.236	+ 4.235	11
6	18	Michael Shin	Team South Korea	10	23:05.044	+ 5.043	13
7	7	Julius Dinesen	Team Denmark	10	23:05.492	+ 5.491	15
8	77	Valentino Mini	Team Panama	10	23:05.925	+ 5.924	23
9	24	Alister Yoong	Team Malaysia	10	23:07.696	+ 7.695	14
10	14	Oleksandr Partyshev	Team Ukraine	10	23:11.458	+ 11.457	24
11	23	Lorens Lecertua	Team Belgium	10	23:12.433	+ 12.432	8
12	12	Zeno Kovacs	Team Hungary	10	23:14.442	+ 14.441	18
13	2	Ruhaan Alva	Team India	10	23:14.926	+ 14.925	17
14	19	Sandro Tavartkiladze	(Georgia (country)) Team Georgia	10	23:16.174	+ 16.173	9
15	16	Guilherme Rocha	Team Mozambique	10	23:16.759	+ 16.758	19
16	17	Pablo Sarrazin	Team France	10	23:17.545	+ 17.544	12
17	1	Ismail Akhmedkhodjaev	Team Uzbekistan	10	23:18.179	+ 18.178	20
18	20	Jasper Thong	Team Hong Kong	10	23:19.053	+ 19.052	21
19	43	Costa Toparis	Team Australia	10	23:28.116	+ 28.115	10
20	11	Valentin Kluss	Team Germany	10	23:58.982	+ 58.981	3
21	15	María José Pérez	Team Chile	9	23:07.255	+ 1 LAP	22
NC	9	Ethan Ho	Team Chinese Taipei	7	15:38.250	+ 3 LAPS	16
NC	10	Filip Jenic	Team Serbia	6	13:55.936	+ 4 LAPS	6
NC	22	Charlie Wurz	Team Austria	0	Puncture		2
Fastest lap: Andrea Kimi Antonelli ( Team Italy) – 2:08.816 (Lap 4)

=== Race ===
Pos.	No.	Driver	Team	Laps	Time	Gap	Grid
1st place, gold medalist(s)	3	Andrea Kimi Antonelli	Team Italy	14	31:22.351	—	1
2nd place, silver medalist(s)	8	Manuel Espírito Santo	Team Portugal	14	31:29.253	+ 6.902	2
3rd place, bronze medalist(s)	6	Bruno del Pino	Team Spain	14	31:33.900	+ 11.549	5
4	7	Julius Dinesen	Team Denmark	14	31:34.700	+ 12.349	7
5	23	Lorens Lecertua	Team Belgium	14	31:35.783	+ 13.432	11
6	11	Valentin Kluss	Team Germany	14	31:41.148	+ 18.797	20
7	14	Oleksandr Partyshev	Team Ukraine	14	31:43.760	+ 21.319	10
8	77	Valentino Mini	Team Panama	14	31:43.974	+ 21.623	8
9	5	Pedro Clerot	Team Brazil	14	31:45.181	+ 22.830 ^{1}	4
10	17	Pablo Sarrazin	Team France	14	31:45.370	+ 23.019	16
11	22	Charlie Wurz	Team Austria	14	31:47.948	+ 25.597 ^{2}	24
12	10	Filip Jenic	Team Serbia	14	31:48.820	+ 26.469	23
13	43	Costa Toparis	Team Australia	14	31:49.268	+ 26.917	19
14	24	Alister Yoong	Team Malaysia	14	31:50.392	+ 28.041	9
15	19	Sandro Tavartkiladze	(Georgia (country)) Team Georgia	14	31:51.624	+ 29.273	14
16	9	Ethan Ho	Team Chinese Taipei	14	31:55.122	+ 32.771	22
17	12	Zeno Kovacs	Team Hungary	14	31:56.726	+ 34.375	12
18	2	Ruhaan Alva	Team India	14	31:59.510	+ 37.159	13
19	1	Ismail Akhmedkhodjaev	Team Uzbekistan	14	32:09.435	+ 47.084	17
20	16	Guilherme Rocha	Team Mozambique	14	32:09.843	+ 47.492	15
21	20	Jasper Thong	Team Hong Kong	14	32:17.154	+ 54.803	18
22	15	María José Pérez	Team Chile	14	32:18.669	+ 56.318	21
23	18	Michael Shin	Team South Korea	13	31:45.821	+ 1 LAP	6
NC	4	Dario Cabanelas	Team Switzerland	0	Collision		3
Fastest lap: Andrea Kimi Antonelli ( Team Italy) – 2:07.002 (Lap 4)

Notes

- ^1 Pedro Clerot got a 5 seconds time penalty added to the total race time for having exceeded track limits on 6 separate occasions during the Main Race.
- ^2 Charlie Wurz got a 10 seconds time penalty added to the total race time for having gone off track at Turn 3 without following the Race Director Event Notes item 11 regarding the safe method to rejoin the track.
