= Michael Shin =

South Korean racing driver (born 2004)

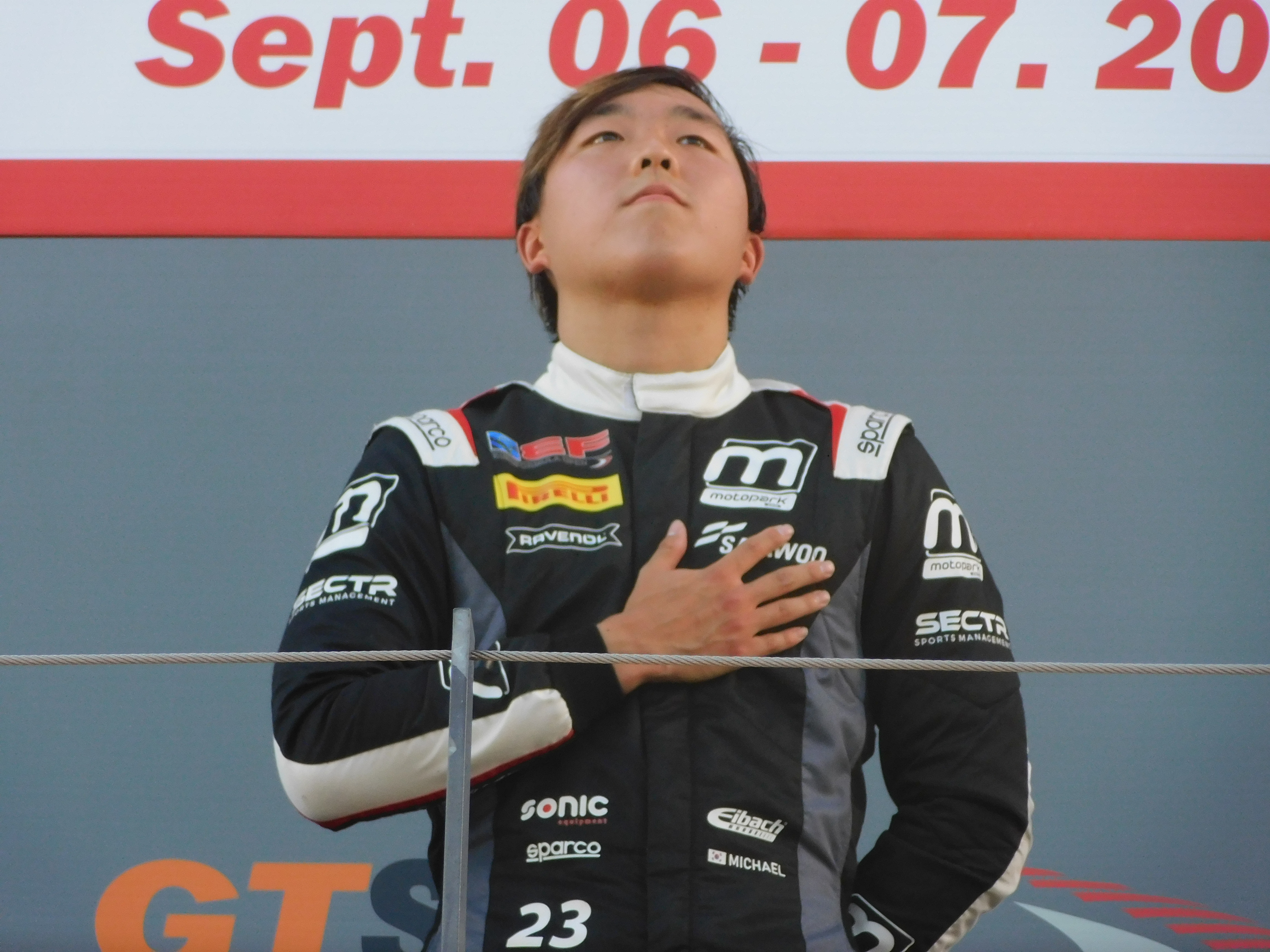
- Shin on the podium at the Red Bull Ring in 2025
- Nationality: (South Korea) South Korean
- Born: Shin Woo-hyun; 23 August 2004 (age 22) Seoul, South Korea
- Relatives: Chung Eui-sun (uncle)

FIA Formula 3 Championship career
- Debut season: 2023
- Current team: Hitech
- Car number: 23
- Former teams: PHM Racing
- Starts: 25
- Wins: 0
- Podiums: 0
- Poles: 0
- Fastest laps: 0
- Best finish: 32nd in 2023

Previous series
- 2024–2025; 2024–2025; 2024; 2023, 2025; 2023; 2022; 2022: Euroformula Open; FR Oceania; Eurocup-3; GB3; FR Middle East F4 British; F4 UAE

Korean name
- Hangul: 신우현
- RR: Sin Uhyeon
- MR: Sin Uhyŏn
- Statistics up to date as of 15 September 2026.

Shin Woo-hyun (Korean: 신우현; born 23 August 2004), better known as Michael Shin, is a South Korean racing driver who is set to compete in the FIA Formula 3 Championship with Hitech.

Shin made his competitive racing debut in the 2022 Formula 4 UAE Championship with JHR Developments, and competed in the 2022 F4 British Championship. The following year, he competed in the Formula Regional Middle East Championship with Prema Racing, and the GB3 Championship with Hitech Grand Prix, before making his debut in the FIA Formula 3 Championship later that year with PHM Racing by Charouz. Shin finished third in the 2025 Euroformula Open Championship and is the first driver from South Korea to race in the FIA Formula 3 Championship.

== Personal life ==
Shin is the nephew of the executive chairman and CEO of the Hyundai Motor Group, Chung Eui-sun.

== Career ==
=== Karting ===
Shin did one year of karting in South Korea, before moving to the United Kingdom to test Formula 4 machinery with JHR Developments, stating that karting in South Korea "was not a good enough environment for me to progress".

=== Formula 4 ===
==== 2021 ====
Shin began testing Formula Renault 2.0 and Formula 4 cars in the United Kingdom with JHR Developments in 2021, being coached by former racing driver Callan O'Keeffe. He took part in the official test day of the Brands Hatch GP round of the 2021 F4 British Championship with JHR Developments, finishing 17th out of 18 competitors.

==== 2022 ====
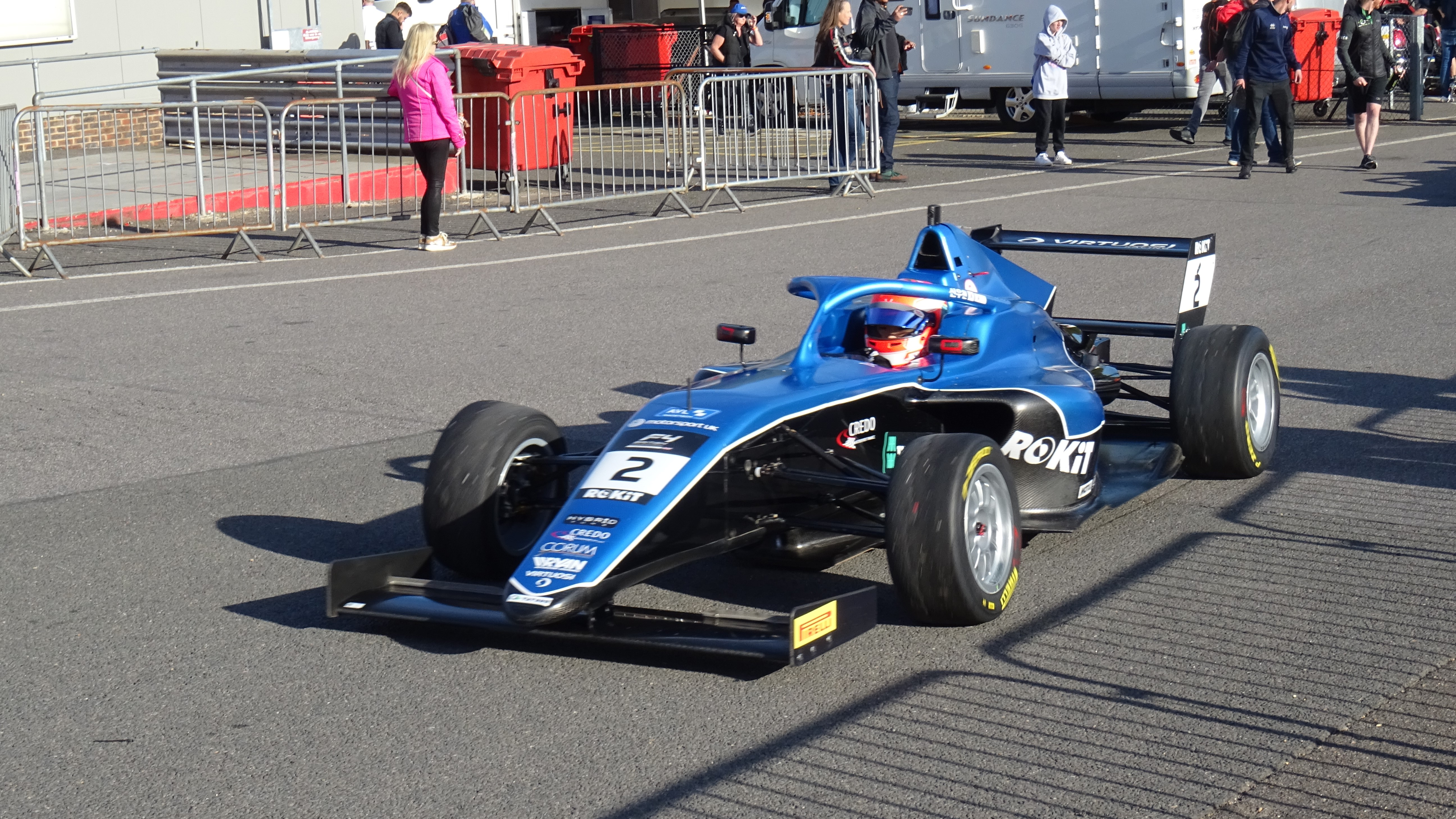
Shin racing in the 2022 F4 British Championship at Brands Hatch

On 1 December 2021, it was announced that Shin would compete in the 2022 Formula 4 UAE Championship with JHR Developments. He finished 29th in the overall standings, and 7th in the Rookies’ Championship.

On 9 March 2022, it was announced that Shin would compete in the 2022 F4 British Championship with Virtuosi Racing alongside Edward Pearson. He achieved his first win in Race 2 of Round 2 at the Brands Hatch Indy circuit, and finished 11th in the standings.

=== FIA Motorsport Games ===
==== Formula 4 ====
Shin represented his native South Korea in the 2022 FIA Motorsport Games Formula 4 Cup. He qualified 13th out of 24 drivers in qualifying, and made up positions to finish sixth in the qualifying race. However, in the main race, Shin made contact with another car, damaging his front wing and forcing him to pit for repairs, resulting in him finishing in last place of the finishers, one lap behind the leader.

=== Formula Regional Middle East Championship ===
On 20 December 2022, it was announced that Shin would be competing in the 2023 Formula Regional Middle East Championship with Prema Racing. Shin scored a second-placed podium during the penultimate race at Abu Dhabi, and finished 14th in the standings.

=== GB3 Championship ===
==== 2023 ====
Shin made the step up to GB3 in 2023 with Hitech Grand Prix. Shin did not score a podium in the championship, but scored consistently and ended the standings in 18th.

==== 2025 ====
In August 2025, Shin returned to GB3 in a one-off appearance in Silverstone with Hillspeed.

=== FIA Formula 3 ===
==== 2023 ====
In July 2023, it was announced that Shin would drive for PHM Racing by Charouz for the remainder of the 2023 FIA Formula 3 Championship, replacing McKenzy Cresswell. Shin achieved his best finish of 11th in the Monza feature race, but was demoted to 17th following a post-race penalty. He was classified 32nd in the standings, just behind his full-time teammate Roberto Faria and ahead of three other competitors.

==== 2026 ====
For 2026, Shin returned to Formula 3 full-time with Hitech, as a new member of the Genesis Magma Racing Trajectory Programme.

==== 2027 ====
Shin continued with Hitech for a second Formula 3 season in 2027.

=== Formula Regional Oceania Championship ===
==== 2024 ====
Shin made his debut in the championship in 2024 with M2 Competition. He scored a third place in the opening race, later taking his first Formula Regional win at Euromarque Motorsport Park. Shin scored three more podiums in that campaign and placed fourth in the standings.

==== 2025 ====
Shin returned to the Formula Regional Oceania Championship for 2025, once again with M2 Competition. With consistent points scores, Shin scored two podiums throughout the season with second in Teretonga and third at Highlands Motorsport Park, finishing eighth in the standings with 197 points.

=== Eurocup-3 ===
Shin would move to Eurocup-3 for 2024, joining forces with Campos Racing. He started his season rather slowly, but scored his first podium with third place during the second race in Portimão. He was involved in a serious crash in Zandvoort where Shin's car barrel-rolled seven times after a collision with Alexander Abkhazava, but both emerged unscathed. Despite that, he returned to the podium just a round later in Aragón, and even secured a double third place finish in Jerez. With four podiums in total, Shin placed seventh in the driver standings with 98 points.

=== Euroformula Open ===
==== 2024 ====
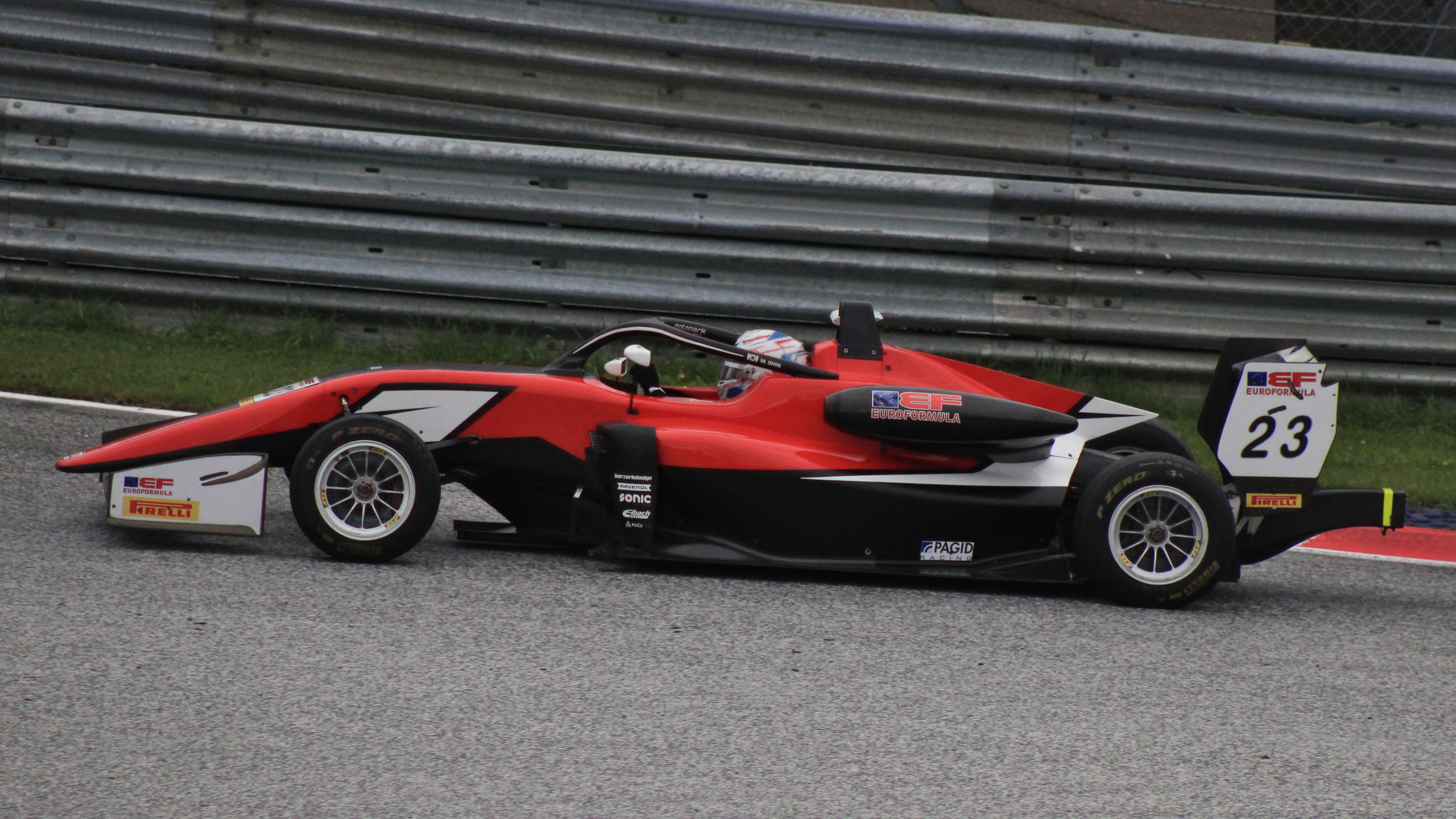
Shin driving at the Red Bull Ring during the 2024 Euroformula Open

In 2024, Shin also raced in selected rounds of the Euroformula Open for Team Motopark, earning his first win during the second round in Hockenheim. He again won later in the season at the Red Bull Ring, and he eventually finished sixth in the standings.

==== 2025 ====
Shin continued in Euroformula Open for the 2025 season, remaining with Team Motopark.

== Racing record ==
=== Racing career summary ===
Season	Series	Team	Races	Wins	Poles	F/Laps	Podiums	Points	Position
2022	Formula 4 UAE Championship	JHR Developments	20	0	0	0	0	0	29th
2022	F4 British Championship	Virtuosi Racing	30	1	0	1	2	87	11th
2022	FIA Motorsport Games Formula 4 Cup	Team South Korea	1	0	0	0	0	N/A	23rd
2023	Formula Regional Middle East Championship	Prema Racing	15	0	0	0	1	35	14th
2023	GB3 Championship	Hitech Grand Prix	21	0	0	0	0	144	18th
2023	FIA Formula 3 Championship	PHM Racing by Charouz	6	0	0	0	0	0	32nd
2024	Formula Regional Oceania Championship	M2 Competition	15	1	0	1	5	245	4th
2024	Eurocup-3	Campos Racing	16	0	0	0	4	98	7th
2024	Euroformula Open Championship	Team Motopark	12	2	1	1	6	187	6th
2025	Formula Regional Oceania Championship	M2 Competition	15	0	0	1	2	197	8th
2025	Euroformula Open Championship	Team Motopark	24	4	0	7	12	317	**3rd**
2025	GB3 Championship	Hillspeed	3	0	0	0	1	40	24th
2026	FIA Formula 3 Championship	Hitech	19	0	0	0	0	0	33rd
2027	FIA Formula 3 Championship	Hitech	0	0	0	0	0	0	TBD

=== Complete Formula 4 UAE Championship results ===
(key) (Races in bold indicate pole position) (Races in italics indicate fastest lap)

Year	Team	1	2	3	4	5	6	7	8	9	10	11	12	13	14	15	16	17	18	19	20	DC	Points
2022	JHR Developments	YMC1; 1; 18	YMC1; 2; 18	YMC1; 3; 20	YMC1; 4; 13	DUB1; 1; 24	DUB1; 2; 18	DUB1; 3; 28	DUB1; 4; 14	DUB2; 1 Ret	DUB2; 2; 26	DUB2; 3 Ret	DUB2; 4; 15	DUB3; 1; 20	DUB3; 2; 21	DUB3; 3; 18	DUB3; 4; 22	YMC2; 1; 12	YMC2; 2; 19	YMC3; 3; 15	YMC4; 4; 20	29th	0

=== Complete F4 British Championship results ===
(key) (Races in bold indicate pole position) (Races in italics indicate fastest lap)

Year	Team	1	2	3	4	5	6	7	8	9	10	11	12	13	14	15	16	17	18	19	20	21	22	23	24	25	26	27	28	29	30	DC	Points
2022	Virtuosi Racing	DON; 1; 13	DON; 2; 4	DON; 3; 8	BHI; 1; 5	BHI; 2; 1	BHI; 3; 6	THR1; 1; 9	THR1; 2; 13	THR1; 3 Ret	OUL; 1; 9	OUL; 2; 15	OUL; 3; 12	CRO; 1; 12	CRO; 2 Ret	CRO; 3; 8	KNO; 1; 13	KNO; 2; 14	KNO; 3; 8	SNE; 1; 13	SNE; 2; 12^{1}	SNE; 3; 7	THR2; 1; 10	THR2; 2; 12	THR2; 3; 13	SIL; 1; 10	SIL; 2 Ret	SIL; 3; 14	BHGP; 1; 8	BHGP; 2; 2	BHGP; 3; 8	11th	87

=== Complete FIA Motorsport Games results ===
Year	Team	Cup	Qualifying	Quali Race	Main Race
2022	Team South Korea	**Formula 4**	13th	6th	23rd

=== Complete Formula Regional Middle East Championship results ===
(key) (Races in bold indicate pole position) (Races in italics indicate fastest lap)

Year	Entrant	1	2	3	4	5	6	7	8	9	10	11	12	13	14	15	DC	Points
2023	Prema Racing	DUB1; 1; 18	DUB1; 2; 19	DUB1; 3; 19	KUW1; 1; 5	KUW1; 2; 11	KUW1; 3 Ret	KUW2; 1; 18	KUW2; 2; 8	KUW2; 3; 17	DUB2; 1; 17	DUB2; 2; 17	DUB2; 3; 14	ABU; 1; 10	ABU; 2; 2	ABU; 3; 9	14th	35

=== Complete GB3 Championship results ===
(key) (Races in bold indicate pole position) (Races in italics indicate fastest lap)

Year	Team	1	2	3	4	5	6	7	8	9	10	11	12	13	14	15	16	17	18	19	20	21	22	23	24	DC	Points
2023	Hitech Pulse-Eight	OUL; 1; 10	OUL; 2; 5	OUL; 3; 4^{9}	SIL1; 1; 20	SIL1; 2; 11	SIL1; 3; 19	SPA; 1; 16	SPA; 2 Ret	SPA; 3 Ret	SNE; 1; 12	SNE; 2; 8	SNE; 3; 19	SIL2; 1	SIL2; 2	SIL2; 3	BRH; 1; 8	BRH; 2; 17	BRH; 3; 6^{7}	ZAN; 1 Ret	ZAN; 2; 18	ZAN; 3; 15^{10}	DON; 1; 16	DON; 2; 20	DON; 3; 17	18th	144
2025	Hillspeed	SIL1; 1	SIL1; 2	SIL1; 3	ZAN; 1	ZAN; 2	ZAN; 3	SPA; 1	SPA; 2	SPA; 3	HUN; 1	HUN; 2	HUN; 3	SIL2; 1; 11	SIL2; 2; 3	SIL2; 3; 10	BRH; 1	BRH; 2	BRH; 3	DON; 1	DON; 2	DON; 3	MNZ; 1	MNZ; 2	MNZ; 3	24th	40

=== Complete FIA Formula 3 Championship results ===
(key) (Races in bold indicate pole position) (Races in italics indicate fastest lap)

Year	Entrant	1	2	3	4	5	6	7	8	9	10	11	12	13	14	15	16	17	18	19	20	DC	Points
2023	PHM Racing by Charouz	BHR; SPR	BHR; FEA	MEL; SPR	MEL; FEA	MON; SPR	MON; FEA	CAT; SPR	CAT; FEA	RBR; SPR	RBR; FEA	SIL; SPR	SIL; FEA	HUN; SPR; 26	HUN; FEA; 28	SPA; SPR; 21	SPA; FEA; 25	MNZ; SPR; Ret	MNZ; FEA; 17			32nd	0
2026	Hitech	MEL; SPR; 25	MEL; FEA; 26†	MON; SPR; 18	MON; FEA; 26	CAT; SPR; 21	CAT; FEA; 29	RBR; SPR; 25	RBR; FEA; Ret	SIL; SPR; 27	SIL; FEA; 23	SPA; SPR; 24	SPA; FEA; 19	HUN; SPR; 23	HUN; FEA; 22	MNZ; SPR; Ret	MNZ; FEA; 22	MAD; SPR; 26	MAD; FEA1; Ret	MAD; FEA2; 25		33rd	0
2027	Hitech	BHR; SPR	BHR; FEA	JED; SPR	JED; FEA	MEL; SPR	MEL; FEA	MTL; SPR	MTL; FEA	MON; SPR	MON; FEA	SIL; SPR	SIL; FEA	RBR; SPR	RBR; FEA	MNZ; SPR	MNZ; FEA	MAD; SPR	MAD; FEA	IST; SPR	IST; FEA	TBD	TBD

† Driver did not finish the race, but was classified as he completed over 90% of the race distance.

=== Complete Formula Regional Oceania Championship results ===
(key) (Races in bold indicate pole position) (Races in italics indicate fastest lap)

Year	Team	1	2	3	4	5	6	7	8	9	10	11	12	13	14	15	DC	Points
2024	M2 Competition	TAU; 1; 3	TAU; 2; 7	TAU; 3; 5	MAN; 1; 17	MAN; 2; 12	MAN; 3 Ret	HMP; 1; 6	HMP; 2; 2	HMP; 3; 3	RUA; 1; 8	RUA; 2; 1	RUA; 3; 7	HIG; 1; 4	HIG; 2; 7	HIG; 3; 3	4th	245
2025	M2 Competition	TAU; 1; 6	TAU; 2; 6	TAU; 3; 7	HMP; 1; 9	HMP; 2; 9	HMP; 3; 7	MAN; 1; 11	MAN; 2; 15	MAN; 3; 10	TER; 1 Ret	TER; 2; 9	TER; 3; 2	HIG; 1; 3	HIG; 2 Ret	HIG; 3; 5	8th	197

=== Complete Eurocup-3 results ===
(key) (Races in bold indicate pole position) (Races in italics indicate fastest lap)

Year	Team	1	2	3	4	5	6	7	8	9	10	11	12	13	14	15	16	17	DC	Points
2024	Campos Racing	SPA; 1; 11	SPA; 2 C	RBR; 1; 9	RBR; 2; 7	POR; 1 Ret	POR; 2; 3	POR; 3; 6	LEC; 1; 9	LEC; 2; 8	ZAN; 1 Ret	ZAN; 2; 9	ARA; 1; 3	ARA; 2; 8	JER; 1; 3	JER; 2; 3	CAT; 1; 8	CAT; 2; 10	7th	96

=== Complete Euroformula Open Championship results ===
(key) (Races in bold indicate pole position) (Races in italics indicate fastest lap)

Year	Team	1	2	3	4	5	6	7	8	9	10	11	12	13	14	15	16	17	18	19	20	21	22	23	24	Pos	Points
2024	Team Motopark	PRT; 1	PRT; 2	PRT; 3	HOC; 1; 5	HOC; 2; 5*	HOC; 3; 1	SPA; 1; 5	SPA; 2; 3	SPA; 3; 2	**HUN**; **1**; 2	HUN; 2; 4	HUN; 3; 4	LEC; 1	LEC; 2	LEC; 3	RBR; 1; 5	RBR; 2; 2	RBR; 3; 1	CAT; 1	CAT; 2	CAT; 3	MNZ; 1	MNZ; 2	MNZ; 3	6th	187
2025	Team Motopark	PRT; 1; 2	PRT; 2; 2	PRT; 3; 2	SPA; 1; 6	SPA; 2; 7	SPA; 3; 4	HOC; 1; 1	HOC; 2; 2	HOC; 3; 2	HUN; 1; 4	HUN; 2; 1	HUN; 3; 3	LEC; 1 Ret	LEC; 2; 4	LEC; 3; 9	RBR; 1; 1	RBR; 2; 2	RBR; 3; 5	CAT; 1; 11	CAT; 2; 7	CAT; 3; 1	MNZ; 1 Ret	MNZ; 2; 8	MNZ; 3; 3	3rd	317
