= Lorens Lecertua =

Belgian and Spanish racing driver (born 2006)

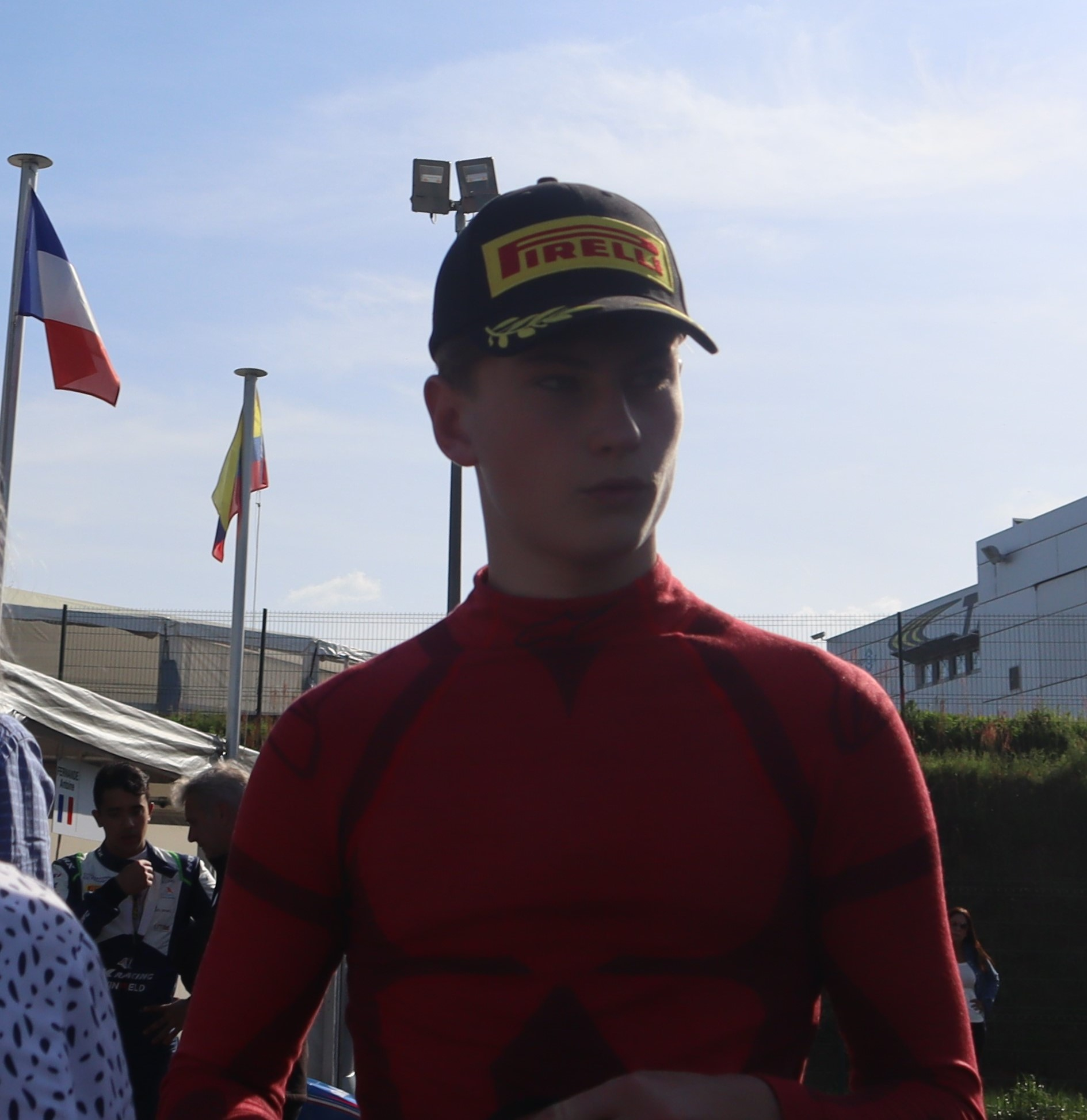
- Lecertua in 2022
- Nationality: (Belgium) Belgian
- Born: Lorens Lecertua García; 23 November 2006 (age 19) Namur, Belgium

GT World Challenge Europe Sprint Cup career
- Debut season: 2024
- Current team: Saintéloc Racing
- Categorisation: FIA Silver
- Former teams: Comtoyou Racing
- Starts: 17
- Wins: 0
- Podiums: 1
- Fastest laps: 1
- Best finish: 14th in 2025

Championship titles
- 2023: Alpine Elf Europa Cup

Awards
- 2023: RACB Rookie of the Year

Lorens Lecertua García (born 23 November 2006) is a Belgian and Spanish racing driver competing in GT World Challenge Europe for CSA Racing.

== Early career ==
=== Karting ===
Lecertua began competitively karting in 2015, winning the Vega Trofeo in the Mini class. From 2019 to 2021 he competed in WSK and CIK-FIA sanctioned events, but achieved the most success outside of those series, finishing third in the X30 Junior category of the 2020 IAME International Games.

=== Formula 4 ===
Lecertua contested his only season of Formula 4 in the 2022 French F4 Championship, getting a lone podium in the second race of the opening round at Circuit Paul Armagnac. He finished the championship in twelfth.

At the end of the year, he represented Team Belgium in the 2022 FIA Motorsport Games Formula 4 Cup, qualifying eighth, coming eleventh in the qualifying race and finishing the main race in fifth.

== Sportscar career ==
=== 2023 ===
Lecertua switched to the one-make Alpine Elf Europa Cup in 2023 with Chazel Technologie Course, winning the overall and junior championships with five wins, five pole positions, eight podiums and 170 points. He took part in the first round of the 2023 Ultimate Cup Series in the C4B class, winning one race. Lecertua became 2023 RACB Rookie of the Year.

=== 2024 ===
Lecertua stepped up to GT3 in 2024, driving an Aston Martin for Belgian outfit Comtoyou Racing in the GT World Challenge Europe Sprint Cup. He finished eleventh in the Silver Cup class with 28.5 points. He also made a one-off cameo in the International GT Open, collecting a podium at the Spa enduro with Matisse Lismont.

Back with Chazel Technologie Course, Lecertua took park in two separate GT4 events at the wheel of an Alpine: one in the French GT4 Cup, winning on debut, and another in the GT4 European Series, where he retired from both races.

=== 2025 ===
In 2025, Lecertua signed with Saintéloc Racing to compete in the Silver category of both the GT World Challenge Europe Endurance Cup and Sprint Cup aboard an Audi R8 LMS Evo II. He partnered Ivan Klymenko in both and ended the Endurance Cup fifth in their category, coming third in the first race at Circuit Paul Ricard and finishing second in the 2025 24 Hours of Spa.

Their Sprint Cup campaign brought more silverware, getting five podiums through the year and even a win at Circuit Zandvoort, where they also came second overall in the race. Lecertua and Klymenko ended the Silver class in fifth and the overall championship in fourteenth. Lecertua and Saintéloc also participated in the first three rounds of the French GT4 Cup.

=== 2026 ===
For the 2026 season, Lecertua switched to another French outfit, CSA Racing, where he contested the GT World Challenge Europe Endurance Cup in the Silver category as a new McLaren junior driver. He partnered Romain Andriolo and Baptiste Moulin and achieved his first outright podium with third overall and second in class at Monza.

== Personal life ==
Lecertua's mother is Belgian, whilst his father is Basque. He is mentored by LMP2 driver Reshad de Gerus.

== Karting record ==
=== Karting career summary ===
Season	Series	Team	Position
2015	Vega Trofeo – Super Mini		16th
2015	Vega Trofeo – Mini		1st
2016	X30 Challenge Europa – X30 Mini	Ward Racing	5th
2016	Andrea Margutti Trophy – 60 Mini	DCK Karting	NC
2016	Vega Trofeo – Super Mini		4th
2017	WSK Champions Cup – 60 Mini	DCK Racing	NC
2017	WSK Super Master Series – 60 Mini	DCK Racing	57th
2017	Andrea Margutti Trophy – 60 Mini	DCK Racing	NC
2017	WSK Final Cup – 60 Mini	Ravet Racing	34th
2017	Vega Trofeo – Super Mini		6th
2018	WSK Champions Cup – 60 Mini	Ravet Racing	NC
2018	WSK Super Master Series – 60 Mini	Ravet Racing	62nd
2018	IAME International Open – X30 Mini	Ravet Racing	2nd
2018	23° South Garda Winter Cup – Mini ROK	Lecertua Luis	27th
2018	WSK Final Cup – OK Junior	Lecertua Luis	45th
2018	Vega Trofeo – Junior		16th
2019	WSK Champions Cup – OK Junior	Luis Lecertua	26th
2019	WSK Super Master Series – OK Junior	Luis Lecertua	38th
2019	WSK Euro Series – OK Junior	Luis Lecertua	52nd
2019	24° South Garda Winter Cup – OK Junior	Luis Lecertua	NC
2019	CIK-FIA Karting European Championship – OK Junior	Luis Lecertua	34th
2019	48° Trofeo delle Industrie – OK Junior	Luis Lecertua	9th
2019	WSK Open Cup – OK Junior	Luis Lecertua	31st
2019	WSK Final Cup – OK Junior	Luis Lecertua	NC
2019	Coupe de France – OK Junior	Lecertua	44th
2020	WSK Champions Cup – OK Junior	LLK	NC
2020	WSK Super Master Series – OK Junior	LLK	41st
2020	CIK-FIA Karting European Championship – OK Junior	LLK	25th
2020	CIK-FIA World Championship – OK Junior	LLK	NC
2020	Champions of the Future – OK Junior	LLK Belgium	20th
2020	IAME International Games – X30 Junior	LLK Belgium	3rd
2021	WSK Champions Cup – OK	VDK Racing	NC
2021	WSK Euro Series – OK	LLK Lecertua	45th
2021	CIK-FIA World Championship – OK	LLK Lecertua	NC
2021	IAME Euro Series – X30 Senior	LLK Lecertua	19th
2021	Champions of the Future – OK	LLK Lecertua	24th
2021	CIK-FIA Karting European Championship – OK	LLK Lecertua	22nd
2021	WSK Open Cup – OK	LLK Lecertua	27th

== Racing record ==
=== Racing career summary ===
Season	Series	Team	Races	Win	Poles	F/Laps	Podiums	Points	Position
2022	French F4 Championship	FFSA Academy	21	0	0	0	1	51	12th
2022	FIA Motorsport Games Formula 4 Cup	Team Belgium	1	0	0	0	0	N/A	5th
2023	Alpine Elf Europa Cup	Chazel Technologie Course	12	5	5	4	8	170	1st
2023	Ultimate Cup Series – C4B	Chazel Technologie Course	3	1	0	0	1	16	10th
2024	French GT4 Cup – Silver	Chazel Technologie Course	2	1	0	0	2	40	8th
2024	GT4 European Series – Pro-Am	Chazel Technologie Course	2	0	0	0	0	0	NC
2024	International GT Open	Comtoyou Racing	1	0	0	0	1	20	21st
2024	GT World Challenge Europe Sprint Cup	Comtoyou Racing	7	0	0	0	0	0	NC
2024	GT World Challenge Europe Sprint Cup – Silver	Comtoyou Racing	7	0	0	0	0	28.5	11th
2025	GT World Challenge Europe Sprint Cup	Saintéloc Racing	10	0	0	1	1	12	14th
2025	GT World Challenge Europe Sprint Cup – Silver	Saintéloc Racing	10	1	2	1	5	72	5th
2025	GT World Challenge Europe Endurance Cup	Saintéloc Racing	5	0	0	0	0	0	NC
2025	GT World Challenge Europe Endurance Cup – Silver	Saintéloc Racing	5	0	0	0	2	57	5th
2025	French GT4 Cup – Pro-Am	Saintéloc Racing	5	0	0	1	0	20	12th
2026	GT World Challenge Europe Endurance Cup	CSA Racing	3	0	0	0	1	15	17th
2026	GT World Challenge Europe Endurance Cup	Saintéloc Racing	1	0	0	0	0	15	17th
2026	GT World Challenge Europe Endurance Cup – Silver	CSA Racing	3	0	0	0	1	21	21st
2026	GT World Challenge Europe Endurance Cup – Silver	Saintéloc Racing	1	0	0	0	0	21	21st

^{*} Season still in progress.

=== Complete French F4 Championship results ===
(key) (Races in bold indicate pole position) (Races in italics indicate fastest lap)

Year	1	2	3	4	5	6	7	8	9	10	11	12	13	14	15	16	17	18	19	20	21	Pos	Points
2022	NOG; 1; 9	NOG; 2; 3	NOG; 3; 7	PAU; 1; 13	PAU; 2; 13	PAU; 3 Ret	MAG; 1; 18	MAG; 2; 4	MAG; 3; 9	SPA; 1; 9	SPA; 2; 12	SPA; 3; 7	LÉD; 1; 11	LÉD; 2; 7	LÉD; 3; 9	CRT; 1 Ret	CRT; 2; 11	CRT; 3; 8	LEC; 1; 12	LEC; 2 Ret	LEC; 3; 10	12th	51

=== Complete FIA Motorsport Games results ===
Year	Team	Cup	Qualifying	Quali Race	Main race
2022	Team Belgium	**Formula 4**	8th	11th	5th

=== Complete GT World Challenge Europe results ===
==== GT World Challenge Europe Sprint Cup ====
(key) (Races in bold indicate pole position) (Races in italics indicate fastest lap)

Year	Team	Car	Class	1	2	3	4	5	6	7	8	9	10	Pos.	Points
2024	Comtoyou Racing	Aston Martin Vantage AMR GT3 Evo	Silver	BRH; 1	BRH; 2	MIS; 1; 27	MIS; 2; 19	HOC; 1; 29	HOC; 2; 29	MAG; 1; 25	MAG; 2 DNS	CAT; 1 Ret	CAT; 2; 18	11th	28.5
2025	Saintéloc Racing	Audi R8 LMS Evo II	Silver	**BRH**; **1**; 17	BRH; 2; 13	ZAN; 1; 14	**ZAN**; **2**; 2	MIS; 1; 11	MIS; 2; 39	MAG; 1; 21	MAG; 2; 18	VAL; 1 Ret	VAL; 2; 21	5th	72

==== GT World Challenge Europe Endurance Cup ====
(Races in bold indicate pole position) (Races in italics indicate fastest lap)

Year	Team	Car	Class	1	2	3	4	5	6	7	Pos.	Points
2025	Saintéloc Racing	Audi R8 LMS Evo II	Silver	LEC; 22	MNZ; Ret	SPA; 6H; 27	SPA; 12H; 33	SPA; 24H; 18	NÜR; 49	CAT; 20	5th	57
2026	CSA Racing	McLaren 720S GT3 Evo	Silver	LEC; Ret	MNZ; 3	SPA; 6H; 45	SPA; 12H; 33	SPA; 24H; 40			21st	21
2026	Saintéloc Racing	Audi R8 LMS Evo II	Silver						NÜR; Ret	ALG	21st	21

^{*} Season still in progress.
