= Valentin Kluss =

German racing driver (born 2007)

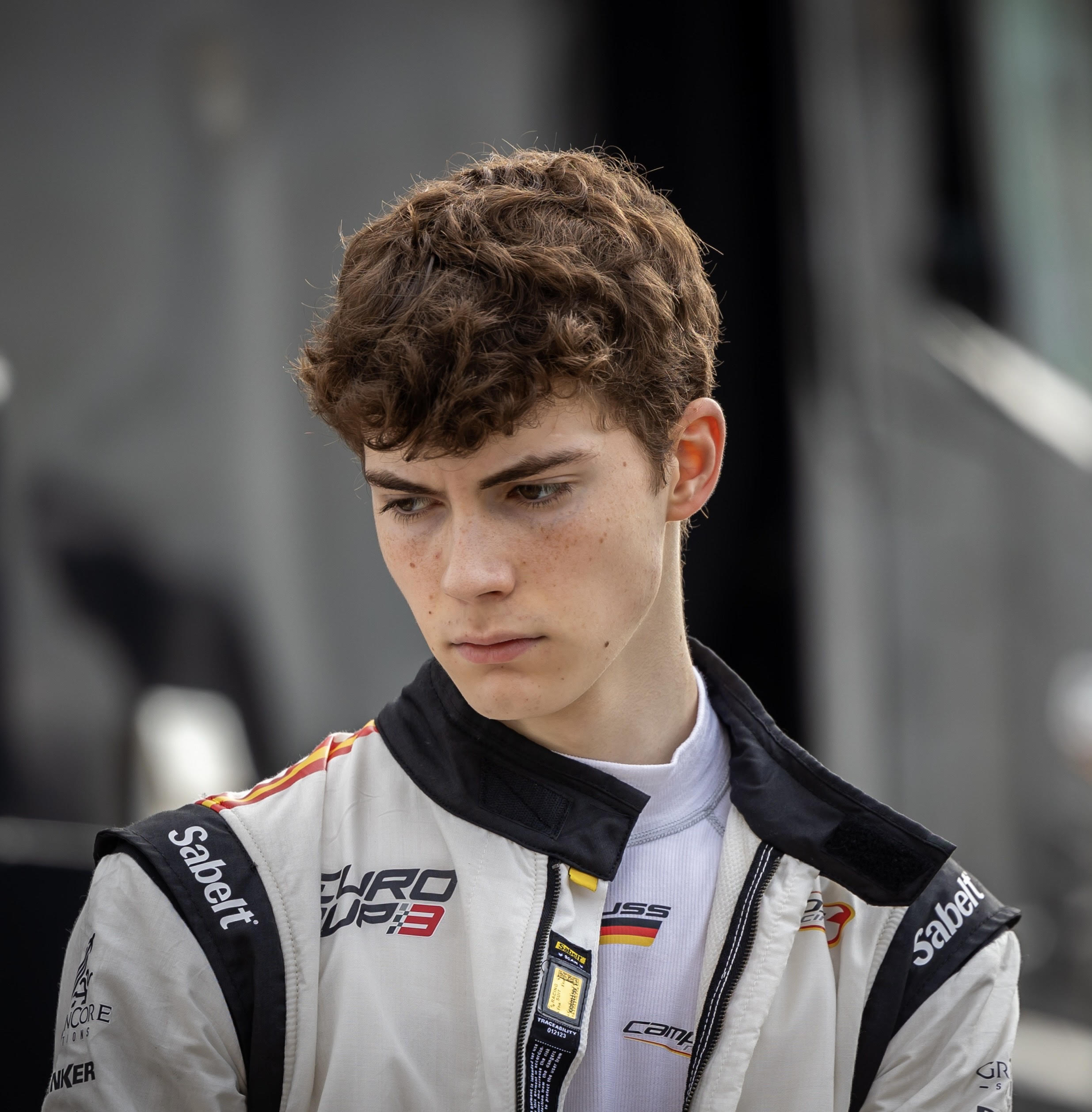
- Kluss in 2024
- Nationality: (Germany) German
- Born: 25 May 2007 (age 19) Bad Mergentheim, Germany

Eurocup-3 career
- Debut season: 2024
- Current team: Campos Racing
- Car number: 5
- Starts: 20 (21 entries)
- Wins: 0
- Podiums: 3
- Poles: 1
- Fastest laps: 1
- Best finish: 6th in 2024

Previous series
- 2023 2023 2023 2022 2022 2022–2023: FR European Championship; F4 Spanish Championship; Formula 4 UAE Championship; FIA Motorsport Games Formula 4 Cup; ADAC Formula 4 Italian F4 Championship

Valentin Kluss (alternatively spelt Kluß, born 25 May 2007) is a German racing driver who last competed in the Eurocup-3 series for Campos Racing. He previously competed in the 2023 Italian F4 Championship with PHM Racing.

== Career ==
=== Karting ===
Having been bought a kart by his father after completing the challenge of beating the laptime record at his local track by over a second, Kluss started competing in regional competitions at the age of six. After winning the Kart-Cup of his local federal state Baden-Württemberg in 2017, alongside the ACV Kart Nationals during the same year, Kluss progressed into national competitions, taking third in the Rotax Max Challenge Germany in 2018. He would spend the following three years in the junior category, where he won the Rotax Max Challenge in 2020, securing the title with five races to go, and the ADAC Kart Masters in 2021, both in the junior class. Kluss also took part in European series from 2019 onwards, managing to finish third in the Rotax Euro Trophy, as well as competing in the 2021 Karting World Championship with RS Competition.

=== Formula 4 ===
==== 2022 ====
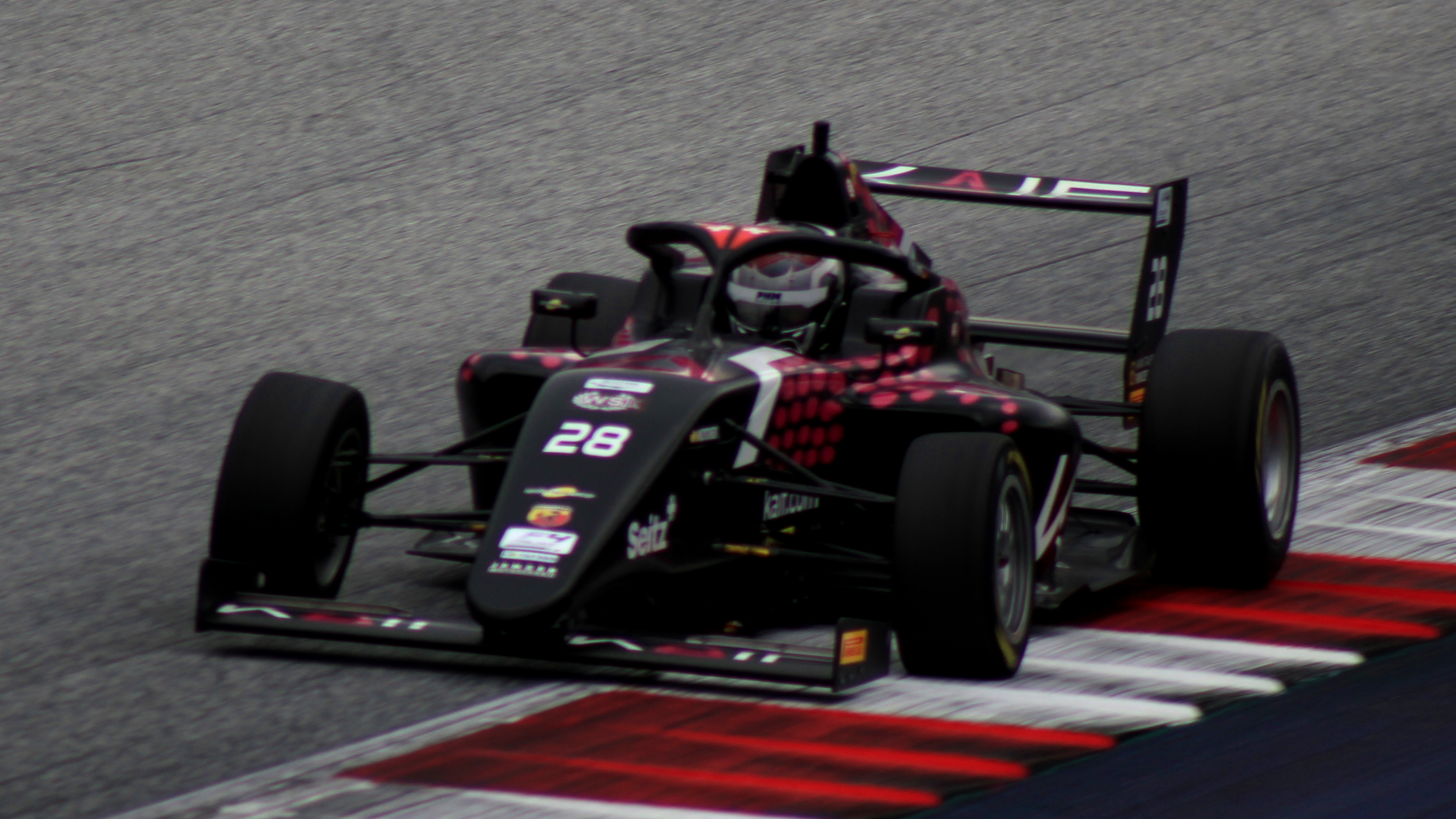
Kluss driving at the Red Bull Ring in 2022.

Having completed tests in Formula 4 with Teo Martín Motorsport at Aragón and at the Hockenheimring with Mücke Motorsport, Kluss progressed into single-seater racing in 2022 thanks to PHM Racing, a newly-founded non-profit racing organization. Having been introduced into the newly formed Motorsport Team Germany, Kluss competed with PHM in the ADAC Formula 4 Championship, whilst being loaned out to Jenzer Motorsport in the Italian F4 Championship. Due to his age, he would only make his debut in the second round of the latter series, where he immediately scored his maiden point in the rookies' championship. In the German Championship, Kluss scored points on debut at Zandvoort, although two collisions would lead to a pair of retirements the following day. More points would follow at the Nürburgring, before Kluss took his first ever podium in single-seaters during a rain-affected Race 3 at the Lausitzring, beating Rasmus Joutsimies by three thousandths of a second across the finish line.

Kluss was nominated by the German Motor Sport Federation as their Formula 4 representative for the FIA Motorsport Games held at the end of the year. He went on to finish sixth in the FIA Motorsport Games Formula 4 Cup.

==== 2023 ====
In 2023, Kluss remained with PHM Racing to compete in the Formula 4 UAE Championship and the Italian F4 Championship. He finished the season tenth in the UAE championship and fifteenth in the Italian championship. In 2023 Kluss also joined MP Motorsport to compete in the Estoril round of the F4 Spanish Championship.

=== Formula Regional ===
In October 2023, Kluss also joined Monolite Racing to compete in the final round of the Formula Regional European Championship at the Hockenheimring.

=== Eurocup-3 ===
==== 2024 ====
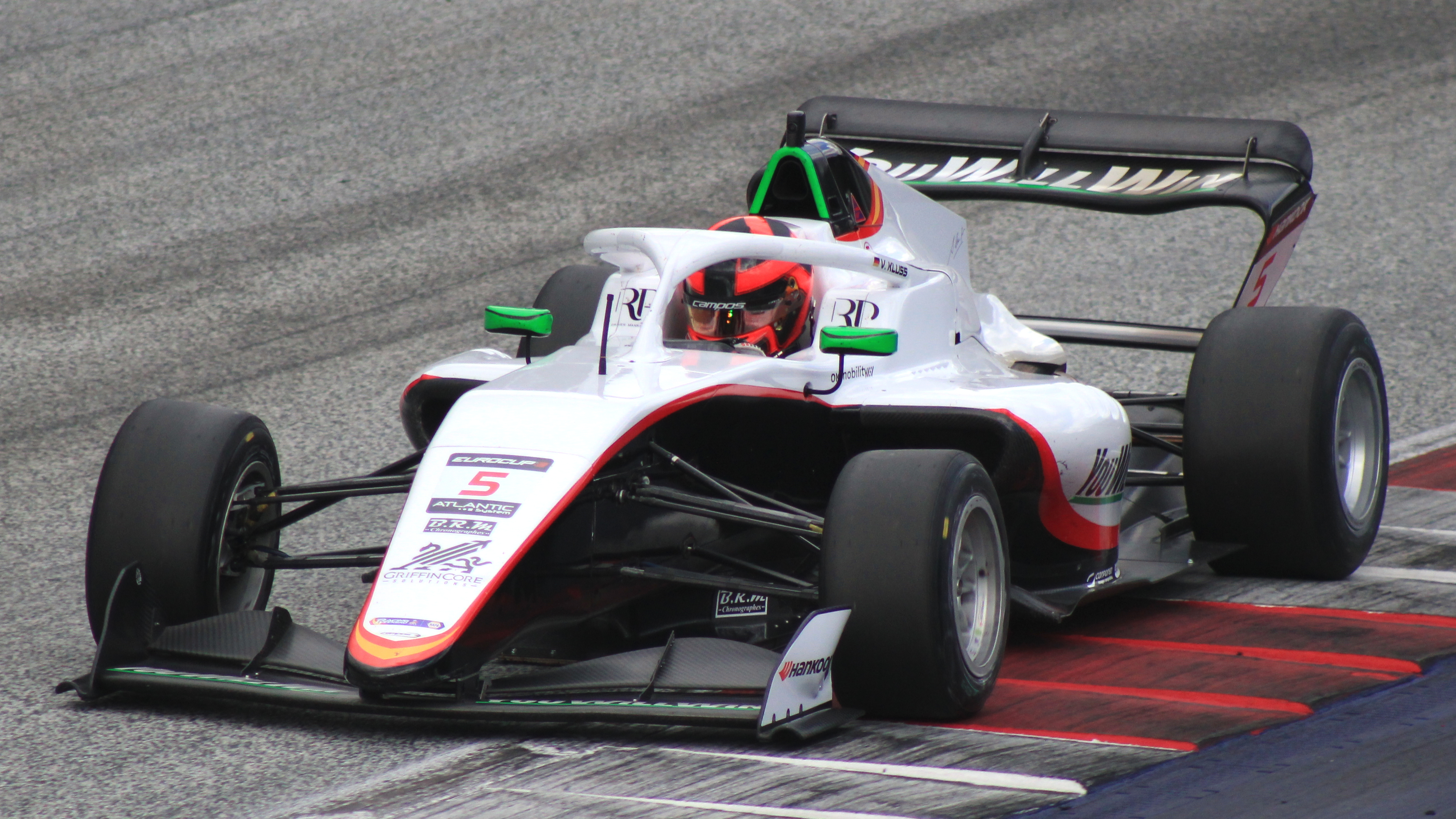
Kluss racing at the Red Bull Ring during the 2024 Eurocup-3 season

In 2024, Kluss joined Campos Racing for a full-time step up to the Formula Regional-level Eurocup-3 series. He had a slow start to the season, but managed to earn his first pole and podiums in Portimão with second and third. Kluss also took another third place during the second race in Zandvoort. After that, he scored in every race until the end of the season, meaning that Kluss finished sixth in the standings with 121 points, securing three podiums.

==== 2026 ====
Kluss made a one-off return in Eurocup-3 in 2026 with TC Racing during the Silverstone round.

== Karting record ==
=== Karting career summary ===
Season	Series	Team	Position
2015	Baden-Württemberg Kart-Cup — Rotax Micro	Nees Racing	6th
2016	Baden-Württemberg Kart-Cup — Rotax Micro	Nees Racing	2nd
2016	Rotax Max Challenge Germany — Rotax Micro	Nees Racing	11th
2017	Baden-Württemberg Kart-Cup — Rotax Micro	Nees Racing	1st
2017	ACV Kart Nationals — Rotax Micro	Nees Racing	1st
2017	Rotax Max Challenge Germany — Rotax Micro	Nees Racing	6th
2018	Rotax Max Challenge Germany — Rotax Mini	Nees Racing	3rd
2018	Rotax Max Challenge Clubsport — Mini	Nees Racing	8th
2019	BNL Karting Series — Junior Max	RS Competition	31st
2019	Rotax Max Challenge Germany — Junior	RS Competition	10th
2019	Rotax Max Challenge Euro Trophy — Junior	RS Competition	25th
2019	Rotax Max Challenge International Trophy — Junior	RS Competition	NC
2019	Rotax Max Challenge Clubsport — Junior National	RS Competition	2nd
2020	BNL Karting Series - Kick-Off — Junior Max	RS Competition	17th
2020	Rotax Max Euro Winter Cup — Junior	RS Competition	25th
2020	ADAC Kart Masters — OKJ	RS Competition	NC
2020	Rotax Max Challenge Germany — Junior	RS Competition	1st
2020	Rotax Max Challenge Euro Trophy — Junior	RS Competition	3rd
2020	Rotax Max Challenge International Trophy — Junior	RS Competition	13th
2020	Rotax Max Challenge Clubsport — Junior National	RS Competition	2nd
2020	Deutsche Kart Meisterschaft — OKJ	RS Competition	NC†
2021	WSK Champions Cup — OKJ	RS Competition	NC
2021	WSK Super Master Series — OKJ	RS Competition	NC†
2021	Deutsche Kart Meisterschaft — OKJ	RS Competition	8th
2021	ADAC Kart Masters — OKJ	KSM Official Racing Team	1st
2021	CIK-FIA World Championship — OKJ	RS Competition	58th

^{†} As Kluss was a guest driver, he was ineligible to be classified in the standings.

=== Complete Karting World Championship results ===
Year	Team	Car	Quali Heats	Main race
2021	(Germany) RS Competition	OKJ	58th	DNQ

== Racing record ==
=== Racing career summary ===
Season	Series	Team	Races	Wins	Poles	F/Laps	Podiums	Points	Position
2022	Italian F4 Championship	Jenzer Motorsport	17	0	0	0	0	4	21st
2022	ADAC Formula 4 Championship	PHM Racing	12	0	0	0	1	61	11th
2022	FIA Motorsport Games Formula 4 Cup	Team Germany	1	0	0	0	0	N/A	6th
2023	Formula 4 UAE Championship	PHM Racing	15	0	0	0	0	50	10th
2023	Italian F4 Championship	PHM Racing	15	0	0	0	0	34	15th
2023	F4 Spanish Championship	MP Motorsport	3	0	0	0	0	8	16th
2023	Formula Regional European Championship	Monolite Racing	2	0	0	0	0	0	NC†
2024	Eurocup-3	Campos Racing	16	0	1	1	3	121	6th
2026	GT4 Winter Series	NM Racing Team							
2026	Eurocup-3	TC Racing	2	0	0	0	0	0	40th

^{*} Season still in progress.

=== Complete Italian F4 Championship results ===
(key) (Races in bold indicate pole position) (Races in italics indicate fastest lap)

Year	Team	1	2	3	4	5	6	7	8	9	10	11	12	13	14	15	16	17	18	19	20	21	22	DC	Points
2022	Jenzer Motorsport	IMO; 1	IMO; 2	IMO; 3	MIS; 1; 15	MIS; 2; 20	MIS; 3; 23	SPA; 1; 20	SPA; 2; 15	SPA; 3; 19	VLL; 1; 16	VLL; 2; 14	VLL; 3; 15	RBR; 1; 14	RBR; 2	RBR; 3; 11	RBR; 4; 16	MNZ; 1; 8	MNZ; 2; 20	MNZ; 3 C	MUG; 1; 16	MUG; 2; 19	MUG; 3; 12	21st	4
2023	PHM Racing	IMO; 1	IMO; 2; 6	IMO; 3; 6	IMO; 4; 6	MIS; 1; 10	MIS; 2; 18	MIS; 3; 17	SPA; 1; 11	SPA; 2; 14	SPA; 3; 10	MNZ; 1; 27†	MNZ; 2; 6	MNZ; 3; 12	LEC; 1; 16	LEC; 2; 14	LEC; 3 Ret	MUG; 1	MUG; 2	MUG; 3	VLL; 1	VLL; 2	VLL; 3	15th	34

^{*} Season still in progress.

=== Complete ADAC Formula 4 Championship results ===
(key) (Races in bold indicate pole position) (Races in italics indicate fastest lap)

Year	Team	1	2	3	4	5	6	7	8	9	10	11	12	13	14	15	16	17	18	DC	Points
2022	PHM Racing	SPA; 1	SPA; 2	SPA; 3	HOC; 1	HOC; 2	HOC; 3	ZAN; 1; 11	ZAN; 2 Ret	ZAN; 3 Ret	NÜR1; 1; 8	NÜR1; 2; 10	NÜR1; 3 Ret	LAU; 1 Ret	LAU; 2; 4	LAU; 3; 3	NÜR2; 1; 8	NÜR2; 2; 6	NÜR2; 3; 7	11th	61

=== Complete FIA Motorsport Games results ===
Year	Team	Cup	Qualifying	Quali Race	Main race
2022	Team Germany	**Formula 4**	**3rd**	20th	6th

=== Complete Formula 4 UAE Championship results ===
(key) (Races in bold indicate pole position) (Races in italics indicate fastest lap)

Year	Team	1	2	3	4	5	6	7	8	9	10	11	12	13	14	15	Pos	Points
2023	PHM Racing	DUB1; 1; 4	DUB1; 2; 9	DUB1; 3; 19	KMT1; 1; 9	KMT1; 2; 7	KMT1; 3; 4	KMT2; 1; 7	KMT2; 2; 5	KMT2; 3; 18	DUB2; 1 Ret	DUB2; 2 Ret	DUB2; 3; 15	YMC; 1; 35†	YMC; 2; 14	YMC; 3; 13	10th	50

=== Complete F4 Spanish Championship results ===
(key) (Races in bold indicate pole position) (Races in italics indicate fastest lap)

Year	Team	1	2	3	4	5	6	7	8	9	10	11	12	13	14	15	16	17	18	19	20	21	DC	Points
2023	MP Motorsport	SPA; 1	SPA; 2	SPA; 3	ARA; 1	ARA; 2	ARA; 3	NAV; 1	NAV; 2	NAV; 3	JER; 1	JER; 2	JER; 3	EST; 1 Ret	EST; 2; 8	EST; 3; 7	CRT; 1	CRT; 2	CRT; 3	CAT; 1	CAT; 2	CAT; 3	16th	8

=== Complete Formula Regional European Championship results ===
(key) (Races in bold indicate pole position) (Races in italics indicate fastest lap)

Year	Team	1	2	3	4	5	6	7	8	9	10	11	12	13	14	15	16	17	18	19	20	DC	Points
2023	Monolite Racing	IMO; 1	IMO; 2	CAT; 1	CAT; 2	HUN; 1	HUN; 2	SPA; 1	SPA; 2	MUG; 1	MUG; 2	LEC; 1	LEC; 2	RBR; 1	RBR; 2	MNZ; 1	MNZ; 2	ZAN; 1	ZAN; 2	HOC; 1 Ret	HOC; 2; 19	NC†	0

^{†} As Kluss was a guest driver, he was ineligible to score point.

=== Complete Eurocup-3 results ===
(key) (Races in bold indicate pole position) (Races in italics indicate fastest lap)

Year	Team	1	2	3	4	5	6	7	8	9	10	11	12	13	14	15	16	17	18	19	DC	Points
2024	Campos Racing	SPA; 1; 7	SPA; 2 C	RBR; 1; 19	RBR; 2; 6	POR; 1; 6	**POR**; **2**; 2	POR; 3; 3	LEC; 1; 7	LEC; 2; 4	ZAN; 1; 12	ZAN; 2; 3	ARA; 1; 7	ARA; 2; 7	JER; 1; 9	JER; 2; 10	CAT; 1; 9	CAT; 2; 8			6th	119
2026	TC Racing	LEC; 1	LEC; SR	LEC; 2	POR; 1	POR; 2	IMO; 1	IMO; SR	IMO; 2	MNZ; 1	MNZ; 2	SIL; 1; 22	SIL; 2; 18	JER; 1	JER; SR	JER; 2	HUN; 1	HUN; 2	CAT; 1	CAT; 2	40th	0

* Season still in progress.
