= 2022 F4 British Championship =

The 2022 RoKit F4 British Championship was a multi-event, Formula 4 open-wheel single seater motor racing championship held across United Kingdom. The championship featured a mix of professional motor racing teams and privately funded drivers, competing in Formula 4 cars that conformed to the technical regulations for the championship. This, the eighth season, following on from the British Formula Ford Championship, was the eighth year that the cars conform to the FIA's Formula 4 regulations. Part of the TOCA tour, it forms part of the extensive program of support categories built up around the BTCC centrepiece.

The season commenced on 23 April at Donington Park and concluded on 9 October at Brands Hatch, utilising the Grand Prix circuit, after thirty races held at ten meetings, all in the support of the 2022 British Touring Car Championship.

This was the first season of the championship using the combination of Tatuus chassis and the engines supplied by Abarth.

== Teams and drivers ==
All teams were British-registered. Seven teams were chosen initially to compete in the series.

Team	No.	Drivers	Class	Rounds
Virtuosi Racing	2	(South Korea) Michael Shin		All
Virtuosi Racing	3	(United Kingdom) Edward Pearson		All
Hitech Grand Prix	4	(United Kingdom) Oliver Stewart	R	All
Hitech Grand Prix	5	(United Kingdom) Daniel Mavlyutov (Note: Mavlyutov is a Turkish-Russian driver competing under a British licence.)	R	All
Hitech Grand Prix	16	(Philippines) Eduardo Coseteng		All
Hitech Grand Prix	22	(Republic of Ireland) Alex Dunne		1–9
Chris Dittmann Racing	8	(India) Jaden Pariat	R	9–10
Chris Dittmann Racing	29	(United Kingdom) Joel Pearson		1–5
Chris Dittmann Racing	55	(India) Divy Nandan		7–8
Chris Dittmann Racing	78	(United Kingdom) Jack Sherwood		7–10
Fortec Motorsports	9	(Australia) Marcos Flack		9–10
Fortec Motorsports	18	(United Kingdom) James Higgins		9–10
Carlin	11	(New Zealand) Louis Sharp		2–10
Carlin	31	(United States) Ugo Ugochukwu	R	All
Carlin	63	(United Kingdom) Oliver Gray		All
JHR Developments	14	(Australia) Noah Lisle	R	All
JHR Developments	23	(Bulgaria) Georgi Dimitrov (Note: Dimitrov is a British-Bulgarian driver competing under a Bulgarian licence.)		All
JHR Developments	84	(United Kingdom) Joseph Loake		All
Phinsys by Argenti	26	(Israel) Isaac Barashi (Note: Barashi is a British-Israeli-Portuguese driver competing under an Israeli licence.)	R	9–10
Phinsys by Argenti	49	(United Kingdom) Daniel Guinchard	R	All
Phinsys by Argenti	57	(United Kingdom) Aiden Neate		All
Phinsys by Argenti	88	(Republic of Ireland) Adam Fitzgerald	R	All

Icon	Class
R	Rookie

== Race calendar ==
All races were held in the United Kingdom. All rounds supported 2022 British Touring Car Championship. The provisional calendar was announced by BTCC on 30 June 2021 and Motorsport UK, the new organiser of the Formula 4 series, confirmed its presence alongside on 24 September 2021.

Round		Circuit	Date	Pole position	Fastest lap	Winning driver	Winning team	Rookie winner
1	R1	Donington Park (National Circuit, Leicestershire)	23 April	(United States) Ugo Ugochukwu	(United States) Ugo Ugochukwu	(Republic of Ireland) Alex Dunne	Hitech Grand Prix	(United States) Ugo Ugochukwu
1	R2	Donington Park (National Circuit, Leicestershire)	24 April		(South Korea) Michael Shin	(Bulgaria) Georgi Dimitrov	JHR Developments	(United Kingdom) Daniel Guinchard
1	R3	Donington Park (National Circuit, Leicestershire)	24 April	(Republic of Ireland) Alex Dunne	(Republic of Ireland) Alex Dunne	(Republic of Ireland) Alex Dunne	Hitech Grand Prix	(United States) Ugo Ugochukwu
2	R4	Brands Hatch (Indy Circuit, Kent)	14 May	(Republic of Ireland) Alex Dunne	(Republic of Ireland) Alex Dunne	(Republic of Ireland) Alex Dunne	Hitech Grand Prix	(United States) Ugo Ugochukwu
2	R5	Brands Hatch (Indy Circuit, Kent)	14 May		(United Kingdom) Oliver Stewart	(South Korea) Michael Shin	Virtuosi Racing	(United States) Ugo Ugochukwu
2	R6	Brands Hatch (Indy Circuit, Kent)	15 May	(Republic of Ireland) Alex Dunne	(Philippines) Eduardo Coseteng	(United States) Ugo Ugochukwu	Carlin	(United States) Ugo Ugochukwu
3	R7	Thruxton Circuit (Hampshire)	28 May	(Republic of Ireland) Alex Dunne	(United States) Ugo Ugochukwu	(Republic of Ireland) Alex Dunne	Hitech Grand Prix	(United States) Ugo Ugochukwu
3	R8	Thruxton Circuit (Hampshire)	29 May		(United Kingdom) Aiden Neate	(United Kingdom) Aiden Neate	Phinsys by Argenti	(United Kingdom) Daniel Guinchard
3	R9	Thruxton Circuit (Hampshire)	29 May	(Republic of Ireland) Alex Dunne	(Republic of Ireland) Alex Dunne	(Republic of Ireland) Alex Dunne	Hitech Grand Prix	(United States) Ugo Ugochukwu
4	R10	Oulton Park (Island Circuit, Cheshire)	11 June	(Republic of Ireland) Alex Dunne	(Republic of Ireland) Alex Dunne	(Republic of Ireland) Alex Dunne	Hitech Grand Prix	(United Kingdom) Daniel Guinchard
4	R11	Oulton Park (Island Circuit, Cheshire)	12 June		(Republic of Ireland) Alex Dunne	(United Kingdom) Daniel Guinchard	Phinsys by Argenti	(United Kingdom) Daniel Guinchard
4	R12	Oulton Park (Island Circuit, Cheshire)	12 June	(Republic of Ireland) Alex Dunne	(Republic of Ireland) Alex Dunne	(New Zealand) Louis Sharp	Carlin	(United Kingdom) Daniel Guinchard
5	R13	Croft Circuit (North Yorkshire)	25 June	(United Kingdom) Aiden Neate	(United States) Ugo Ugochukwu	(United Kingdom) Aiden Neate	Phinsys by Argenti	(United States) Ugo Ugochukwu
5	R14	Croft Circuit (North Yorkshire)	25 June		(Republic of Ireland) Alex Dunne	(Republic of Ireland) Alex Dunne	Hitech Grand Prix	(Australia) Noah Lisle
5	R15	Croft Circuit (North Yorkshire)	26 June	(United Kingdom) Aiden Neate	(New Zealand) Louis Sharp	(United Kingdom) Oliver Gray	Carlin	(United Kingdom) Oliver Stewart
6	R16	Knockhill Racing Circuit (Fife)	30 July	(United States) Ugo Ugochukwu	(Republic of Ireland) Alex Dunne	(United Kingdom) Joseph Loake	JHR Developments	(United Kingdom) Oliver Stewart
6	R17	Knockhill Racing Circuit (Fife)	31 July		(Philippines) Eduardo Coseteng	(Bulgaria) Georgi Dimitrov	JHR Developments	(United Kingdom) Daniel Guinchard
6	R18	Knockhill Racing Circuit (Fife)	31 July	(United States) Ugo Ugochukwu	(United States) Ugo Ugochukwu	(United States) Ugo Ugochukwu	Carlin	(United States) Ugo Ugochukwu
7	R19	Snetterton Motor Racing Circuit (300 Circuit, Norfolk)	13 August	(Republic of Ireland) Alex Dunne	(Republic of Ireland) Alex Dunne	(Republic of Ireland) Alex Dunne	Hitech Grand Prix	(United Kingdom) Daniel Guinchard
7	R20	Snetterton Motor Racing Circuit (300 Circuit, Norfolk)	13 August		(United States) Ugo Ugochukwu	(United Kingdom) Joseph Loake	JHR Developments	(United States) Ugo Ugochukwu
7	R21	Snetterton Motor Racing Circuit (300 Circuit, Norfolk)	14 August	(Republic of Ireland) Alex Dunne	(Republic of Ireland) Alex Dunne	(Republic of Ireland) Alex Dunne	Hitech Grand Prix	(United Kingdom) Oliver Stewart
8	R22	Thruxton Circuit (Hampshire)	27 August	(Republic of Ireland) Alex Dunne	(United States) Ugo Ugochukwu	(Republic of Ireland) Alex Dunne	Hitech Grand Prix	(United States) Ugo Ugochukwu
8	R23	Thruxton Circuit (Hampshire)	27 August		(Republic of Ireland) Alex Dunne	(United Kingdom) Oliver Stewart	Hitech Grand Prix	(United Kingdom) Oliver Stewart
8	R24	Thruxton Circuit (Hampshire)	28 August	(Republic of Ireland) Alex Dunne	(United States) Ugo Ugochukwu	(Republic of Ireland) Alex Dunne	Hitech Grand Prix	(United States) Ugo Ugochukwu
9	R25	Silverstone Circuit (National Circuit, Northamptonshire)	24 September	(United Kingdom) Oliver Gray	(United Kingdom) Joseph Loake	(New Zealand) Louis Sharp	Carlin	(United Kingdom) Daniel Guinchard
9	R26	Silverstone Circuit (National Circuit, Northamptonshire)	25 September		(United States) Ugo Ugochukwu	(Bulgaria) Georgi Dimitrov	JHR Developments	(United States) Ugo Ugochukwu
9	R27	Silverstone Circuit (National Circuit, Northamptonshire)	25 September	(United Kingdom) Oliver Gray	(United Kingdom) Joseph Loake	(United Kingdom) Oliver Gray	Carlin	(United States) Ugo Ugochukwu
10	R28	Brands Hatch (Grand Prix Circuit, Kent)	8 October	(United Kingdom) Joseph Loake	(United Kingdom) Joseph Loake	(United Kingdom) Joseph Loake	JHR Developments	(United Kingdom) Daniel Guinchard
10	R29	Brands Hatch (Grand Prix Circuit, Kent)	9 October		(Philippines) Eduardo Coseteng	(Philippines) Eduardo Coseteng	Hitech Grand Prix	(United States) Ugo Ugochukwu
10	R30	Brands Hatch (Grand Prix Circuit, Kent)	9 October	(United Kingdom) Joseph Loake	(United Kingdom) Joseph Loake	(United Kingdom) Joseph Loake	JHR Developments	(United States) Ugo Ugochukwu

== Championship standings ==
Points were awarded to the top ten classified finishers in races 1 and 3 and for the top eight classified finishers in race 2. Race two, which had its grid formed by reversing the order of the ten best drivers from the qualifying session, awarded extra points for positions gained from the drivers' respective starting positions. Bonus points counted towards only the drivers' standings.

Races	Position, points per race										
Races	**1st**	**2nd**	**3rd**	**4th**	**5th**	**6th**	**7th**	**8th**	**9th**	**10th**	**FL**
Races 1 & 3	25	18	15	12	10	8	6	4	2	1	1
Race 2	15	12	10	8	6	4	2	1			1

=== Drivers' standings ===
Pos	Driver	DON			BHI			THR1			OUL			CRO			KNO			SNE			THR2			SIL			BHGP			Pen.	Pts
1	(Republic of Ireland) Alex Dunne	1	2^{7}	**1**	**1**	14	**14**	**1**	5^{5}	**1**	**1**	9^{1}	**3**	7	1^{1}	3	2	4^{4}	14	**1**	6^{4}	**1**	**1**	10	**1**	3	11	3					412
2	(United Kingdom) Oliver Gray	2	Ret	3	3	2^{3}	2	3	4^{4}	Ret	6	4^{2}	6	3	3^{5}	1	3	5^{2}	2	3	7	2	Ret	6^{7}	12	**4**	10	**1**	2	Ret	3	3	343
3	(United States) Ugo Ugochukwu	**3**	9^{1}	5	4	4^{3}	1	2	6^{3}	2	Ret	3^{1}	10	2	13†	13†	**11**	8^{2}	**1**	15	2^{2}	6	2	9	2	Ret	2^{3}	6	4	5	6		290
4	(New Zealand) Louis Sharp				10	6	3	13	9	3	2	2^{5}	1	4	6	2	4	6	4	7	4	17	3	7^{1}	3	1	3^{3}	Ret	Ret	3^{1}	2		272
5	(United Kingdom) Joseph Loake	5	3	9	2	5^{1}	10	4	8	Ret	7	Ret	9	8	2^{2}	Ret	1	10	3	5	1^{2}	8	6	4^{1}	4	Ret	5^{2}	2	**1**	7^{3}	**1**		271
6	(United Kingdom) Aiden Neate	4	Ret	2	12	10	5	14	1^{5}	4	3	11	5	**1**	4^{6}	**11**	6	3^{2}	5	12	9	14	4	8	6	Ret	4^{5}	4	6	6	4	3	234
7	(Philippines) Eduardo Coseteng	8	5^{1}	4	NC	3^{1}	13	6	Ret	12	10	5^{10}	7	6	7	6	5	2^{2}	6	4	8	4	Ret	2^{1}	Ret	7	6	5	15	1^{1}	7		198
8	(Bulgaria) Georgi Dimitrov	9	1	6	6	7^{1}	11	5	7	11	4	6^{3}	2	10	Ret	5	8	1^{1}	9	2	10	3	11	Ret	7	5	1^{1}	Ret	7	4	11		197
9	(United Kingdom) Daniel Guinchard	7	6	10	11	9	7	7	2	5	5	1^{4}	4	5	9	14†	15†	7^{4}	10	6	3^{2}	13	5	3^{1}	5	2	14	7	3	8	13	3	191
10	(United Kingdom) Oliver Stewart	12	10^{3}	11	8	8^{3}	8	12	14^{1}	9	8	7^{5}	14†	9	14†	4	7	9	7	8	5	5	7	1	9	9	Ret	8	11	12^{3}	12		108
11	(South Korea) Michael Shin	13	4	8	5	1	6	9	13	Ret	9	15	12	12	Ret	8	13	14	8	13	12^{1}	7	10	12	13	10	Ret	14	8	2	8		87
12	(United Kingdom) Edward Pearson	6	7	7	7	11^{1}	9	8	Ret	6	12	8^{3}	Ret	14	8^{5}	10	9	12^{2}	11	9	14^{1}	10	8	11	10	16	Ret	Ret	5	10	5		81
13	(Australia) Noah Lisle	10	11^{1}	12	9	Ret	Ret	11	3	10	11	12	8	13	5^{7}	9	10	13	15	11	13	11	12	Ret	Ret	6	Ret	11	9	11	9		47
14	(Republic of Ireland) Adam Fitzgerald	11	12^{2}	15	13	12^{1}	12	10	11^{3}	8	14	10	11	11	11	7	12	11	12	10	17	12	9	5	8	12	13^{2}	10	10	9^{3}	16		37
15	(United Kingdom) Daniel Mavlyutov	15	13^{2}	14	15	13^{2}	15	16	12^{4}	13	15	13^{3}	13	16	12^{4}	12†	14	15	13	16	15^{1}	15	15	14^{3}	14	15	9^{10}	17†	16	15^{3}	18		32
16	(United Kingdom) Joel Pearson	14	8^{3}	13	14	Ret	4	15	10^{3}	7	13	14	15	15	10^{5}	Ret																	30
17	(Israel) Isaac Barashi																									13	8^{12}	16	17	16^{3}	17		16
18	(United Kingdom) Jack Sherwood																			14	11^{3}	9	13	13^{2}	11	8	15^{2}	12	13	14	10		14
19	(India) Jaden Pariat																									11	7^{11}	15	18	17	15		13
20	(Australia) Marcos Flack																									17	12^{2}	9	14	Ret	Ret		4
21	(India) Divy Nandan																			17	16^{1}	16	14	15^{1}	15								2
22	(United Kingdom) James Higgins																									14	16	13	12	13	14		0
Pos	Driver	DON			BHI			THR1			OUL			CRO			KNO			SNE			THR2			SIL			BHGP			Pen.	Pts

Colour	Result
Gold	Winner
Silver	Second place
Bronze	Third place
Green	Points classification
Blue	Non-points classification
Blue	Non-classified finish (NC)
Purple	Retired, not classified (Ret)
Red	Did not qualify (DNQ)
Red	Did not pre-qualify (DNPQ)
Black	Disqualified (DSQ)
White	Did not start (DNS)
White	Withdrew (WD)
White	Race cancelled (C)
Blank	Did not practice (DNP)
Blank	Did not arrive (DNA)
Blank	Excluded (EX)

**Bold** – Pole
Italics – Fastest Lap
^{x} – Positions Gained

=== Rookie Cup ===
Pos	Driver	DON			BHI			THR1			OUL			CRO			KNO			SNE			THR2			SIL			BHGP			Pen.	Pts
1	(United States) Ugo Ugochukwu	3	9	5	4	4	1	2	6	2	Ret	3	10	2	13†	13†	11	8	1	15	2	6	2	9	2	Ret	2	6	4	5	6		506
2	(United Kingdom) Daniel Guinchard	7	6	10	11	9	7	7	2	5	5	1	4	5	9	14†	15†	7	10	6	3	13	5	3	5	2	14	7	3	8	13	3	471
3	(United Kingdom) Oliver Stewart	12	10	11	8	8	8	12	14	9	8	7	14†	9	14†	4	7	9	7	8	5	5	7	1	9	9	Ret	8	11	12	12		395
4	(Republic of Ireland) Adam Fitzgerald	11	12	15	13	12	12	10	11	8	14	10	11	11	11	7	12	11	12	10	17	12	9	5	8	12	13	10	10	9	16		324
5	(Australia) Noah Lisle	10	11	12	9	Ret	Ret	11	3	10	11	12	8	13	5	9	10	13	15	11	13	11	12	Ret	Ret	6	Ret	11	9	11	9		309
6	(United Kingdom) Daniel Mavlyutov	15	13	14	15	13	15	16	12	13	15	13	14	16	12	12†	14	15	13	16	15	15	15	14	14	15	9	17	16	15	18		224
7	(India) Jaden Pariat																									11	7	15	18	17	15		47
8	(Israel) Isaac Barashi																									13	8	16	17	16	17		38
Pos	Driver	DON			BHI			THR1			OUL			CRO			KNO			SNE			THR2			SIL			BHGP			Pen.	Pts

=== Teams Cup ===
Pos	Team	Pts
1	Carlin	789
2	Hitech Grand Prix	636
3	JHR Developments	506
4	Phinsys by Argenti	438
5	Virtuosi Racing	187
6	Chris Dittmann Racing	39
7	Fortec Motorsports	5
