= Dario Cabanelas (racing driver) =

Swiss-Spanish-Ukrainian racing driver (born 2006)

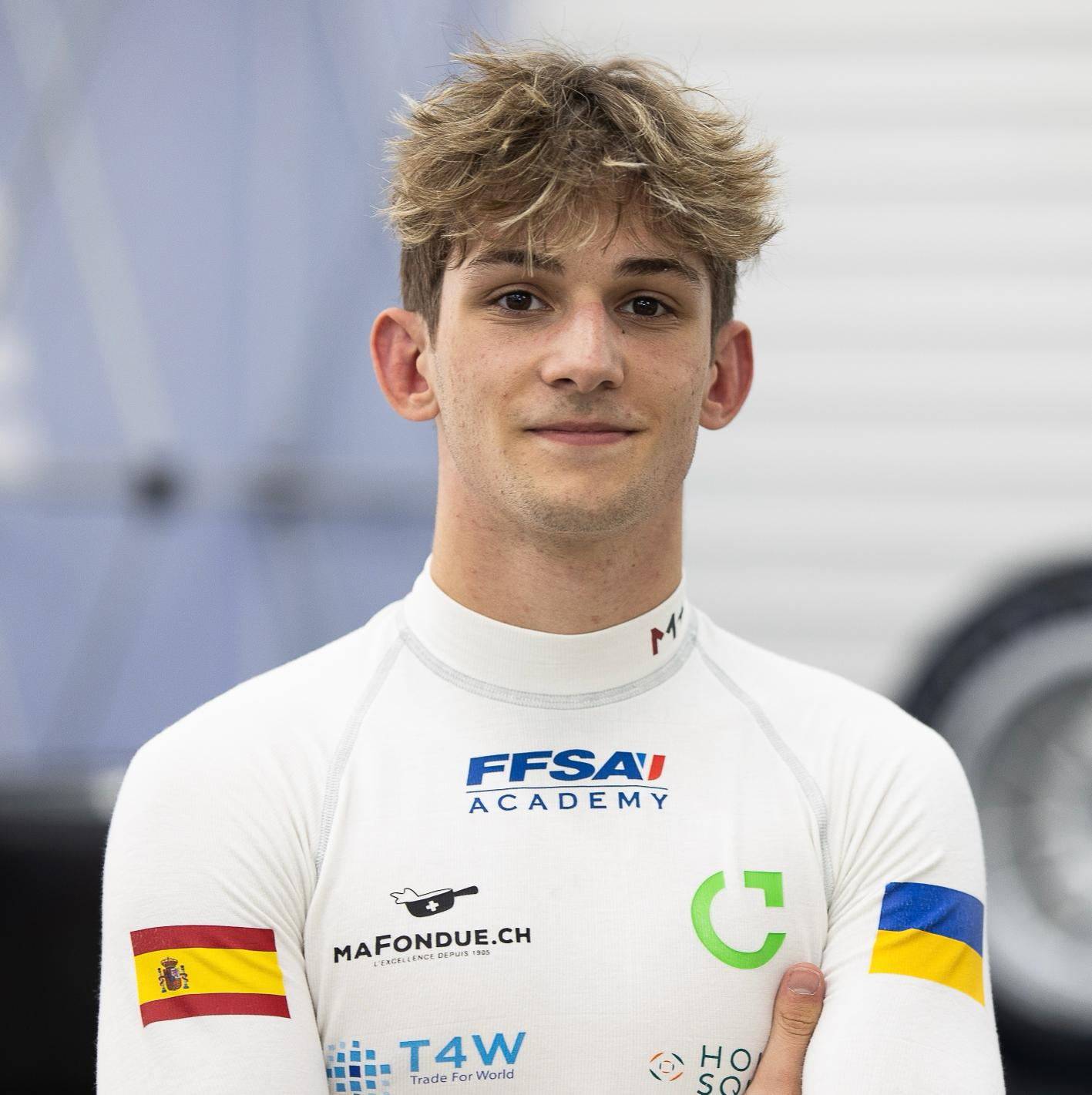
- Cabanelas in 2024
- Nationality: (Switzerland) Swiss (Spain) Spanish (Ukraine) Ukrainian
- Born: 21 July 2006 (age 20) Lausanne, Switzerland
- Categorisation: FIA Silver

Dario Cabanelas Altukhov (born 21 July 2006) is a Swiss, Spanish and Ukrainian racing driver who most recently competed for Team Virage in the JS P4 class of the Ligier European Series.

== Career ==
Cabanelas began karting at the age of six. Competing in karting until 2020, he most notably won the Vega Trophy in 2020 before stepping up to French F4 the following year. In his first season in single-seaters, Cabanelas scored a best result of fourth in the reverse-grid race at Le Castellet, which helped him finish eighth in the standings at season's end.

Remaining in the French F4 Championship for 2022, Cabanelas took two third-place finishes at Pau and Lédenon, en route to a ninth-place points finish. During 2022, Cabanelas also represented Switzerland in the FIA Motorsport Games Formula 4 Cup.

Having spent most of 2023 testing for Saintéloc Racing, Cabanelas remained with them to race in the final four rounds of that year's Eurocup-3 season. Taking his maiden points on his debut round at Jerez, Cabanelas then finished ninth and tenth in both races at Estoril, before taking his fourth and final points finish of the season at Barcelona.

Remaining in Eurocup-3 for 2024, Cabanelas joined MP Motorsport for his only full-time season in the series. Taking points in a wet season opening race at Spa by finishing eighth, Cabanelas then finished tenth in race one at the Red Bull Ring and seventh in race one at Algarve. However, that turned out to be Cabanelas' best result of the season as he scored just one points finish across the next three rounds, a tenth at Zandvoort, before leaving the team and the series with two rounds to spare.

Cabanelas then switched to sports car racing for 2025, joining Team Virage to compete in the JS P4 class of the Ligier European Series. In the season-opening round at Barcelona, Cabanelas fought for the lead in his stints in both of the races, but finished no higher than 13th alongside Laura Villars. After Villars left the team after the round at Le Mans, Cabanelas finished fifth in both races at Spa before leaving the team with two rounds left.

== Karting record ==
=== Karting career summary ===
Season	Series	Team	Position
2017	Asturias Karting Championship – Cadet	La Morgal Sports	2nd
2018	Asturias Karting Championship – Cadet	DPK Racing	2nd
2018	Spanish Championship Karting – Cadet	DPK Racing	20th
2019	Asturias Karting Championship – Junior	DPK Racing	2nd
2019	Spanish Championship Karting – Junior	DPK Racing	15th
2019	Karting European Championship – OK-J	DPK Racing	113th
2019	WSK Open Cup – OK-J	DPK Racing	67th
2020	25° South Garda Winter Cup – OK-J	DPK Racing	NC
2020	WSK Euro Series – OK Junior	DPK Racing	57th
2020	WSK Super Master Series – OK-J	Spirit-Racing.CH	108th
2020	Swiss Kart Championship – OK-J	Spirit Racing	3rd
2020	IAME International Games – X30 Junior	Spirit Racing	13th
2020	Vega Trofeo – Junior	Spirit Racing	1st

== Racing record ==
=== Racing career summary ===
Season	Series	Team	Races	Wins	Poles	F/Laps	Podiums	Points	Position
2021	French F4 Championship	FFSA Academy	20	0	0	0	0	93	8th
2022	French F4 Championship	FFSA Academy	21	0	0	2	2	90	9th
2022	FIA Motorsport Games Formula 4 Cup	Team Switzerland	1	0	0	0	0	—N/a	DNF
2023	Eurocup-3	Saintéloc Racing	8	0	0	0	0	5	18th
2024	Eurocup-3	MP Motorsport	12	0	0	1	0	13	16th
2025	Ligier European Series - JS P4	Team Virage	7	0	0	1	0	22	17th

=== Complete French F4 Championship results ===
(key) (Races in bold indicate pole position) (Races in italics indicate fastest lap)

Year	1	2	3	4	5	6	7	8	9	10	11	12	13	14	15	16	17	18	19	20	21	DC	Points
2021	NOG; 1; 6	NOG; 2; 9	NOG; 3; 6	MAG1; 1; 5	MAG1; 2; 5	MAG1; 3; 7	HUN; 1; 6	HUN; 2; 10	HUN; 3; 6	LÉD; 1; 8	LÉD; 2; 11	LÉD; 3; 8	MON; 1 Ret	MON; 2; 11	MON; 3 C	LEC; 1; 8	LEC; 2; 4	LEC; 3; 9	MAG2; 1; 6	MAG2; 2; 9	MAG2; 3; 7	8th	102
2022	NOG; 1; 11	NOG; 2; 4	NOG; 3; 8	PAU; 1; 6	PAU; 2; 3	PAU; 3; 8	MAG; 1; 24†	MAG; 2; 8	MAG; 3; 6	SPA; 1; 19	SPA; 2; 8	SPA; 3; 8	LÉD; 1; 8	LÉD; 2; 8	LÉD; 3; 3	CRT; 1 Ret	CRT; 2; 9	CRT; 3; 6	LEC; 1; 19	LEC; 2; 5	LEC; 3; 16	9th	90

=== Complete FIA Motorsport Games results ===
Year	Team	Cup	Qualifying	Quali Race	Main Race
2022	Team Switzerland	**Formula 4**	7th	**3rd**	NC

=== Complete Eurocup-3 results ===
(key) (Races in bold indicate pole position) (Races in italics indicate fastest lap)

Year	Team	1	2	3	4	5	6	7	8	9	10	11	12	13	14	15	16	17	DC	Points
2023	Saintéloc Racing	SPA; 1	SPA; 2	ARA; 1	ARA; 2	MON; 1	MON; 2	ZAN; 1	ZAN; 2	JER; 1; 13	JER; 2; 10	EST; 1; 9	EST; 2; 10	CRT; 1; 13	CRT; 2 Ret	BAR; 1; 13	BAR; 2; 10		18th	5
2024	MP Motorsport	SPA; 1; 8	SPA; 2 C	RBR; 1; 10	RBR; 2; 16	ALG; 1; 7	ALG; 2; 21	ALG; 3; 12	LEC; 1; 20	LEC; 2; 22	ZAN; 1 Ret	ZAN; 2; 10	ARA; 1; 19	ARA; 2 Ret	JER; 1 WD	JER; 2 WD	CAT; 1	CAT; 2	16th	13

=== Complete Ligier European Series results ===
(key) (Races in bold indicate pole position; results in italics indicate fastest lap)

Year	Entrant	Class	Chassis	1	2	3	4	5	6	7	8	9	10	11	Rank	Points
2025	Team Virage	JS P4	Ligier JS P4	BAR; 1; 13	BAR; 2; 13	LEC; 1; 13	LEC; 2; 12	LMS; 10	SPA; 1; 5	SPA; 2; 5	SIL; 1	SIL; 2	ALG; 1	ALG; 2	17th	22
