= Costa Toparis =

Australian racing driver (born 2007)

- Nationality: (Australia) Australian
- Born: Costa Santino Toparis; 6 April 2007 (age 19) Australia

Formula Regional European Championship career
- Debut season: 2024
- Current team: KIC Motorsport
- Starts: 4 (4 entries)
- Wins: 0
- Podiums: 0
- Poles: 0
- Fastest laps: 0
- Best finish: 34th in 2024

Costa Santino Toparis (born 6 April 2007) is an Australian racing driver who last competed in the 2024 Formula Regional European Championship for KIC Motorsport.

== Career ==
=== Karting ===
Toparis had a successful karting career in his native Australia and in the Rotax Max Challenge Grand Finals. He came fifth in the 2018 Rotax Max Challenge Grand Finals in the Mini MAX category, and then came in third the following year.

Toparis came runner up to the 2021 Australian Karting Championship in KA2 machinery and won the championship the following season.

=== Formula Ford ===
Toparis made his debut in Formula Ford machinery in the 2022 New South Wales Formula Race Car Championship, where he finished second in eight out of nine races and winning one race at Wakefield.

=== Formula 4 ===
==== FIA Motorsport Games ====
Toparis was announced to be competing in the 2022 FIA Motorsport Games representing Team Australia in the Formula 4 race. He qualified in tenth, finished the Quali race in 19th, and came 13th in the Main race.

==== Formula 4 UAE Championship ====
At the end of the 2022 season, Toparis drove for Carlin in the trophy round at the Formula 4 UAE Championship. He finished the races in fourth and eighth.

==== Formula 4 Australian Championship ====
At the near end of 2024, Toparis would get some racing activity in the 2024 Formula 4 Australian Championship for AGI Sport after having an early exit from the 2024 Formula Regional European Championship. He drove in the final round of the championship at the Sepang International Circuit, the only international round in the championship year and came fourth in the first race and second in the second the third races. Toparis finished the championship in ninth with 48 points.

=== GB3 Championship ===
Instead of competing in Formula 4 full time, Toparis would make a leap to the 2023 GB3 Championship for Rodin Carlin. Despite not scoring any podiums, he would have a consistent maiden campaign and finish the championship 15th in the standings with 151 points.

=== Formula Regional ===
==== Formula Regional Middle East Championship ====
At the start of the 2024 season, Toparis would compete in the 2024 Formula Regional Middle East Championship for Australian team, Evans GP. He started off his campaign poorly, scoring no points in the first three rounds, but his luck would change in the fourth round at the Yas Marina Circuit, where he got his maiden podium in Formula Regional machinery. Toparis scored points in the next two races, but he wouldn't score any points in the final round. He finished the championship in 14th.

==== Formula Regional European Championship ====
Toparis would compete for KIC Motorsport in the 2024 Formula Regional European Championship with technical support from Evans GP. His best result of the season was 19th, which came in the first race of the second round at the Circuit de Spa-Francorchamps. After this round, he exited the championship and positioned 34th overall in the standings.

=== Formula One ===
In late 2024, Toparis partook in the Ferrari World Scouting Finals in Maranello.

== Karting record ==
=== Karting career summary ===
Season	Series	Team	Position
2016	Australian Karting Championship - Cadet 9		10th
2018	Australian Karting Championship - Cadet 12		16th
2018	Rotax Max Challenge Grand Finals - Mini MAX	Ian Black IKD	5th
2019	Australian Karting Championship - Cadet 12		23rd
2019	Rotax Max Challenge Grand Finals - Mini MAX	Ian Black	3rd
2020	Australian Karting Championship - KA2		8th
2021	Australian Karting Championship - KA2		2nd
2022	Australian Karting Championship - KA2		1st

== Racing record ==
=== Racing career summary ===
Season	Series	Team	Races	Wins	Poles	F/Laps	Podiums	Points	Position
2022	New South Wales Formula Race Car Championship	AGI Sport	9	1	1	4	9	230	**3rd**
2022	FIA Motorsport Games Formula 4 Cup	Team Australia	1	0	0	0	0	N/A	13th
2022	Formula 4 UAE Championship - Trophy Round	Carlin	2	0	0	0	0	N/A	NC
2023	GB3 Championship	Rodin Carlin	23	0	0	0	0	151	15th
2024	Formula Regional Middle East Championship	Evans GP	15	0	0	0	1	21	14th
2024	Formula Regional European Championship	KIC Motorsport	4	0	0	0	0	0	34th
2024	Formula 4 Australian Championship	AGI Sport	3	0	0	0	2	48	9th

^{*} Season in progress

=== Complete FIA Motorsport Games results ===
Year	Team	Cup	Qualifying	Quali Race	Main race
2022	Team Australia	**Formula 4**	10th	19th	13th

=== Complete GB3 Championship results ===
(key) (Races in bold indicate pole position) (Races in italics indicate fastest lap)

Year	Team	1	2	3	4	5	6	7	8	9	10	11	12	13	14	15	16	17	18	19	20	21	22	23	24	DC	Points
2023	Rodin Carlin	OUL; 1; 22	OUL; 2; 7	OUL; 3; 6^{8}	SIL1; 1; 8	SIL1; 2; 6	SIL1; 3; 14^{3}	SPA; 1; 10	SPA; 2; 13	SPA; 3; 12	SNE; 1; 21	SNE; 2; 6	SNE; 3; 15^{1}	SIL2; 1; 20	SIL2; 2; 15	SIL2; 3 C	BRH; 1; 17	BRH; 2; 12	BRH; 3; 17	ZAN; 1; 17	ZAN; 2; 15	ZAN; 3; 20	DON; 1; 15	DON; 2; 16	DON; 3 Ret	15th	151

=== Complete Formula Regional Middle East Championship results ===
(key) (Races in bold indicate pole position) (Races in italics indicate fastest lap)

Year	Entrant	1	2	3	4	5	6	7	8	9	10	11	12	13	14	15	DC	Points
2024	Evans GP	YMC1; 1; 21	YMC1; 2; 25	YMC1; 3; 18	YMC2; 1; 14	YMC2; 2; 18	YMC2; 3 Ret	DUB1; 1; 12	DUB1; 2; 14	DUB1; 3; 21	YMC3; 1; 3	YMC3; 2; 8	YMC3; 3; 9	DUB2; 1; 14	DUB2; 2; 15	DUB2; 3; 12	14th	21

=== Complete Formula Regional European Championship results ===
(key) (Races in bold indicate pole position) (Races in italics indicate fastest lap)

Year	Team	1	2	3	4	5	6	7	8	9	10	11	12	13	14	15	16	17	18	19	20	DC	Points
2024	KIC Motorsport	HOC; 1; 28	HOC; 2 Ret	SPA; 1; 19	SPA; 2; 22	ZAN; 1	ZAN; 2	HUN; 1	HUN; 2	MUG; 1	MUG; 2	LEC; 1	LEC; 2	IMO; 1	IMO; 2	RBR; 1	RBR; 2	CAT; 1	CAT; 2	MNZ; 1	MNZ; 2	34th	0

=== Complete Formula 4 Australian Championship results ===
(key) (Races in bold indicate pole position; races in italics indicate fastest lap)

Year	Team	1	2	3	4	5	6	7	8	9	10	11	12	DC	Points
2024	AGI Sport	BEN1; 1	BEN1; 2	BEN1; 3	BEN2; 1	BEN2; 2	BEN2; 3	SYD; 1	SYD; 2	SYD; 3	SEP; 1; 4	SEP; 2; 2	SEP; 3; 2	9th	48
