= Aiden Neate =

British racing driver (born 2006)

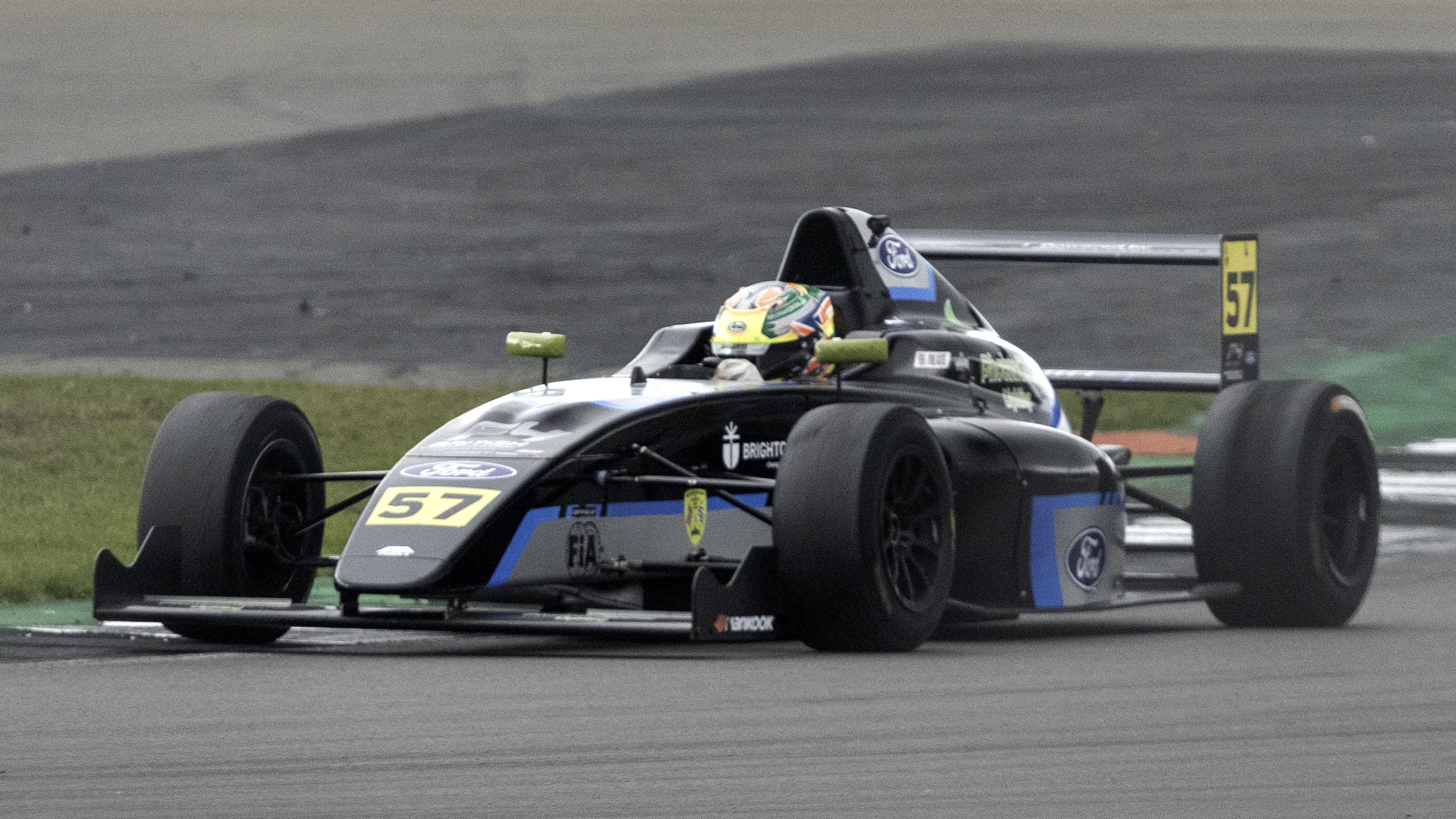
- Neate in 2021
- Nationality: British
- Born: 25 June 2006 (age 20) United Kingdom
- Relatives: Andy Neate (father)

British GT Championship career
- Debut season: 2025
- Categorisation: FIA Silver
- Car number: 57
- Former teams: Mahiki Racing
- Starts: 4 (4 entries)
- Wins: 0
- Podiums: 0
- Poles: 2
- Fastest laps: 0
- Best finish: 14th in 2025

Previous series
- 2024 2023 2021 2023 2021–2022 2021: Porsche Carrera Cup Great Britain; Formula Regional Middle East Championship; F4 British Championship; Formula 4 UAE Championship; French F4 Championship

Aiden Neate (born 25 June 2006) is a British racing driver who last competed in the 2025 British GT Championship for Mahiki Racing. He is a former member of the Alpine Academy.

== Career ==
=== Karting ===
Neate started karting competitively in 2015. In 2018, he scored his first win in the Super 1 National Kart Championships.

=== Formula 4 ===
In 2021, Neate made his car racing debut in the French F4 Championship. After contesting the first two rounds of the season he switched to the F4 British Championship with Phinsys by Argenti, which he contested from the third round onwards. Having scored three podiums, the Briton finished ninth in the drivers' standings.

Having raced in the Trophy Round supporting the 2021 Abu Dhabi Grand Prix with Xcel Motorsport, Neate planted himself into the Formula 4 UAE Championship at the start of the following year, driving for Abu Dhabi Racing by Prema. He finished the season in third after taking a total of nine podiums.

With his sights set on a championship challenge, Neate remained with Phinsys by Argenti for the 2022 F4 British Championship. He took his first Formula 4 win at Thruxton Circuit. After taking another win at Croft Circuit he finished the season in sixth.

In 2023, Neate joined Fortec Motorsport for his third season in the F4 British Championship. Neate announced mid-season that he would leave the F4 British Championship.

=== Formula Regional ===
In 2023, Neate rejoined Prema Racing to compete in the Formula Regional Middle East Championship. After taking his only podium in the opening round at Dubai Autodrome he finished the season in twelfth.

=== Formula One ===
Neate became a member of the Alpine Academy at the start of 2023. He was removed from the academy later that year.

== Personal life ==
Neate is the son of the former British Touring Car Championship driver Andy Neate.

== Karting record ==
=== Karting career summary ===
Season	Series	Team	Position
2015	LGM Series — IAME Cadet		29th
2015	Super 1 National Championship — IAME Cadet		37th
2016	Super 1 National Championship — IAME Cadet		19th
2016	ABkC British Open Championship — IAME Cadet		12th
2017	Super 1 National Championship — IAME Cadet		19th
2018	MSA British Kart Championship — IAME Cadet		5th
2018	LGM Series — IAME Cadet		5th
2018	Kartmasters British Grand Prix — IAME Cadet	Fusion Motorsport	6th
2019	LGM Series — IAME Cadet		11th
2019	Kartmasters British Grand Prix — IAME Cadet	Fusion Motorsport	9th
2019	British Kart Championship — IAME Cadet	Fusion Motorsport	16th
2019	British Kart Championship — X30 Junior	Fusion Motorsport	43rd
2019	WSK Open Cup — OKJ	Tony Kart Racing Team	24th
2019	WSK Final Cup — OKJ		NC
2019	IAME International Final — X30 Junior		10th
2019	SKUSA SuperNationals — X30 Junior		NC
2020	South Garda Winter Cup — OKJ	Tony Kart Racing Team	26th
2020	WSK Champions Cup — OKJ	Tony Kart Racing Team	NC
2020	WSK Euro Series — OKJ	Tony Kart Racing Team	27th
2020	WSK Super Master Series — OKJ	Tony Kart Racing Team	22nd

== Racing record ==
=== Racing career summary ===
Season	Series	Team	Races	Wins	Poles	F/Laps	Podiums	Points	Position
2021	French F4 Championship	FFSA Academy	6	0	0	0	0	30	12th
2021	F4 British Championship	Phinsys by Argenti	24	0	0	2	3	128	9th
2021	Formula 4 UAE Championship - Trophy Round	Xcel Motorsport	1	0	0	0	0	N/A	7th
2022	Formula 4 UAE Championship	Abu Dhabi Racing by Prema	20	0	0	2	9	199	**3rd**
2022	F4 British Championship	Phinsys by Argenti	30	2	2	1	5	234	6th
2023	Formula Regional Middle East Championship	Prema Racing	15	0	0	0	1	58	12th
2023	F4 British Championship	Fortec Motorsport	13	0	0	0	3	91	14th
2024	Porsche Carrera Cup Great Britain - Pro	Eden Race Drive	4	0	0	0	0	0	NC†
2025	British GT Championship - GT4	Mahiki Racing	4	0	2	0	0	23	14th

^{†} As Neate was a guest driver, he was ineligible for points.

=== Complete French F4 Championship results ===
(key) (Races in bold indicate pole position) (Races in italics indicate fastest lap)

Year	1	2	3	4	5	6	7	8	9	10	11	12	13	14	15	16	17	18	19	20	21	DC	Points
2021	NOG; 1; 5	NOG; 2; 4	NOG; 3; 4	MAG1; 1 Ret	MAG1; 2; 9	MAG1; 3; 12	HUN; 1	HUN; 2	HUN; 3	LÉD; 1	LÉD; 2	LÉD; 3	MNZ; 1	MNZ; 2	MNZ; 3	LEC; 1	LEC; 2	LEC; 3	MAG2; 1	MAG2; 2	MAG2; 3	12th	30

=== Complete F4 British Championship results ===
(key) (Races in bold indicate pole position) (Races in italics indicate fastest lap)

Year	Team	1	2	3	4	5	6	7	8	9	10	11	12	13	14	15	16	17	18	19	20	21	22	23	24	25	26	27	28	29	30	DC	Points
2021	Phinsys by Argenti	THR1; 1	THR1; 2	THR1; 3	SNE; 1	SNE; 2	SNE; 3	BHI; 1; 6^{4}	BHI; 2; 16	BHI; 3; 9	OUL; 1; 7	OUL; 2; 15	OUL; 3; 9	KNO; 1 Ret	KNO; 2; 12	KNO; 3; 6	THR2; 1; 5	THR2; 2; 6^{2}	THR2; 3; 4	CRO; 1; 7	CRO; 2 Ret	CRO; 3; 3	SIL; 1; 3	SIL; 2; 10^{6}	SIL; 3 Ret	DON; 1; 5	DON; 2; 9^{5}	DON; 3; 16	BHGP; 1; 11	BHGP; 2 Ret	BHGP; 3; 3	9th	128
2022	Phinsys by Argenti	DON; 1; 4	DON; 2 Ret	DON; 3; 2	BHI; 1; 12	BHI; 2; 10	BHI; 3; 5	THR1; 1; 14	THR1; 2; 1^{5}	THR1; 3; 4	OUL; 1; 3	OUL; 2; 11	OUL; 3; 5	**CRO**; **1**; 1	CRO; 2; 4^{6}	**CRO**; **3**; 11	KNO; 1; 6	KNO; 2; 3	KNO; 3; 5	SNE; 1; 12	SNE; 2; 9	SNE; 3; 14	THR2; 1; 4	THR2; 2; 8	THR2; 3; 6	SIL; 1 Ret	SIL; 2; 4^{5}	SIL; 3; 4	BHGP; 1; 6	BHGP; 2; 6	BHGP; 3; 4	6th	234
2023	Fortec Motorsport	DON; 1; 11	DON; 2; 2^{10}	DON; 3; 11	BHI; 1; 8	BHI; 2; 2	BHI; 3; 12	SNE; 1 C	SNE; 2; 7^{5}	SNE; 3; 6	THR; 1; 4	THR; 2; 13^{8}	THR; 3; 2	OUL; 1 Ret	OUL; 2 Ret	OUL; 3 DNS	SIL; 1 WD	SIL; 2 WD	SIL; 3 WD	CRO; 1	CRO; 2	CRO; 3	KNO; 1	KNO; 2	KNO; 3	DPGP; 1	DPGP; 2	DPGP; 3	BHGP; 1	BHGP; 2	BHGP; 3	14th	91

=== Complete Formula 4 UAE Championship results ===
(key) (Races in bold indicate pole position) (Races in italics indicate fastest lap)

Year	Team	1	2	3	4	5	6	7	8	9	10	11	12	13	14	15	16	17	18	19	20	Pos	Points
2022	Abu Dhabi Racing by Prema	YMC1; 1; 2	YMC1; 2; 2	YMC1; 3; 4	YMC1; 4 Ret	DUB1; 1; 4	DUB1; 2; 2	DUB1; 3; 3	DUB1; 4; 8	DUB2; 1; 17	DUB2; 2; 3	DUB2; 3; 2	DUB2; 4; 3	DUB3; 1 Ret	DUB3; 2; 7	DUB3; 3; 5	DUB3; 4; 7	YMC2; 1; 3	YMC2; 2; 3	YMC2; 3; 19	YMC2; 4; 12	3rd	199

=== Complete Formula Regional Middle East Championship results ===
(key) (Races in bold indicate pole position) (Races in italics indicate fastest lap)

Year	Entrant	1	2	3	4	5	6	7	8	9	10	11	12	13	14	15	DC	Points
2023	Prema Racing	DUB1; 1; 9	DUB1; 2; 2	DUB1; 3; 12	KUW1; 1; 4	KUW1; 2; 8	KUW1; 3; 9	KUW2; 1; 8	KUW2; 2; 16	KUW2; 3; 16	DUB2; 1; 9	DUB2; 2; 5	DUB2; 3; 15	ABU; 1 Ret	ABU; 2; 12	ABU; 3; 8	12th	58

=== Complete British GT Championship results ===
(key) (Races in bold indicate pole position) (Races in italics indicate fastest lap)

Year	Team	Car	Class	1	2	3	4	5	6	7	8	9	DC	Points
2025	Mahiki Racing	Lotus Emira GT4	GT4	DON; 1; 17	**SIL**; **1** Ret	**OUL**; **1** Ret	OUL; 2; 18	SPA; 1	SNE; 1	SNE; 2	BRH; 1	DON; 1	14th	23
