= 2021 French F4 Championship =

French motorsport season

The 2021 French F4 Championship was the 11th season to run under the guise of the French F4 Championship and the fourth under the FIA Formula 4 regulations. The championship used Mygale M14-F4 chassis. The series began on 3 April at Circuit Paul Armagnac and ended on 24 October at Circuit de Nevers Magny-Cours.

== Driver lineup ==
| No. | Driver | Class | Rounds |
|---|---|---|---|
| 5 | (France) Macéo Capietto | | All |
| 6 | (France) Paul Trojani | G | 4 |
| 6 | (United States) Luciano Morano | G | 6–7 |
| 7 | (Switzerland) Dario Cabanelas | J | All |
| 8 | (France) Romain Andriolo | G | 5–6 |
| 9 | (France) Esteban Masson | | All |
| 10 | (France) Alessandro Giusti | J | All |
| 11 | (France) Pierre-Alexandre Provost | J | All |
| 14 | (Thailand) Tasanapol Inthraphuvasak | G | 3 |
| 14 | (France) Louis Pelet | G | 6 |
| 16 | (France) Paul Jerome | G | 6 |
| 17 | (France) Noah Andy | | All |
| 22 | (France) Daniël Ligier | | All |
| 30 | (France) Gaël Julien | | All |
| 35 | (Poland) Adam Szydłowski | | 1–2 |
| 36 | (France) Enzo Géraci | J | All |
| 46 | (France) Elliott Vayron | G | 3, 5–7 |
| 46 | (France) Pablo Sarrazin | G | 4 |
| 51 | (France) Angélina Favario | | All |
| 53 | (India) Vignesh Kadarabad | | 1–2 |
| 57 | (United Kingdom) Aiden Neate | J | 1–2 |
| 66 | (France) Enzo Richer | G | 3, 5–7 |
| 68 | (Australia) Hugh Barter | | All |
| 74 | (France) Enzo Peugeot | G | 7 |
| 77 | (Thailand) Thanapongpan Sutumno | | 1 |
| 77 | (Thailand) Thanapongpan Sutumno | G | 6 |
| 79 | (France) Owen Tangavelou | | All |

| Icon | Status |
|---|---|
| J | Drivers that compete for the Junior Championship |
| G | Guest drivers ineligible for Drivers' Championship |

== Race calendar ==
On 27 November 2020 French Federation of Automobile Sport announced a seven-round calendar with the round supporting provisionally 2021 French Grand Prix. On 20 January 2021, FFSA Academy announced another round at Magny-Cours in October instead as the idea was dropped. The round at Circuit de Lédenon was postponed from 27 to 29 August to 10–12 September due to the clash of FFSA GT Championship, the main event, with 2021 GT World Challenge Europe.

| Round | | Circuit | Date | Pole position | Fastest lap | Winning driver | Junior Winner |
|---|---|---|---|---|---|---|---|
| 1 | R1 | (France) Circuit Paul Armagnac, Nogaro | 4 April | (France) Esteban Masson | (France) Esteban Masson | (France) Esteban Masson | (United Kingdom) Aiden Neate |
| 1 | R2 | (France) Circuit Paul Armagnac, Nogaro | 4 April | | (France) Macéo Capietto | (Thailand) Thanapongpan Sutumno | (France) Alessandro Giusti |
| 1 | R3 | (France) Circuit Paul Armagnac, Nogaro | 5 April | (France) Esteban Masson | (France) Macéo Capietto | (Australia) Hugh Barter | (United Kingdom) Aiden Neate |
| 2 | R1 | (France) Circuit de Nevers Magny-Cours, Magny-Cours | 8 May | (France) Esteban Masson | (France) Esteban Masson | (France) Macéo Capietto | (Switzerland) Dario Cabanelas |
| 2 | R2 | (France) Circuit de Nevers Magny-Cours, Magny-Cours | 8 May | | (France) Esteban Masson | (France) Esteban Masson | (Switzerland) Dario Cabanelas |
| 2 | R3 | (France) Circuit de Nevers Magny-Cours, Magny-Cours | 9 May | (France) Esteban Masson | (Australia) Hugh Barter | (France) Esteban Masson | (France) Alessandro Giusti |
| 3 | R1 | (Hungary) Hungaroring, Mogyoród | 10 July | (France) Esteban Masson | (France) Esteban Masson | (France) Esteban Masson | (Switzerland) Dario Cabanelas |
| 3 | R2 | (Hungary) Hungaroring, Mogyoród | 10 July | | (France) Elliott Vayron | (France) Alessandro Giusti | (France) Alessandro Giusti |
| 3 | R3 | (Hungary) Hungaroring, Mogyoród | 11 July | (France) Macéo Capietto | (France) Macéo Capietto | (France) Macéo Capietto | (Switzerland) Dario Cabanelas |
| 4 | R1 | (France) Circuit de Lédenon, Lédenon | 11 September | (France) Macéo Capietto | (France) Macéo Capietto | (France) Macéo Capietto | (France) Alessandro Giusti |
| 4 | R2 | (France) Circuit de Lédenon, Lédenon | 11 September | | (France) Esteban Masson | (France) Pierre-Alexandre Provost | (France) Pierre-Alexandre Provost |
| 4 | R3 | (France) Circuit de Lédenon, Lédenon | 12 September | (France) Gaël Julien | (France) Gaël Julien | (France) Gaël Julien | (France) Alessandro Giusti |
| 5 | R1 | (Italy) Autodromo Nazionale di Monza, Monza | 25 September | (France) Macéo Capietto | (France) Macéo Capietto | (France) Elliott Vayron | (France) Enzo Géraci |
| 5 | R2 | (Italy) Autodromo Nazionale di Monza, Monza | 26 September | | (France) Elliott Vayron | (France) Elliott Vayron | (France) Alessandro Giusti |
| 5 | R3 | (Italy) Autodromo Nazionale di Monza, Monza | 26 September | (France) Alessandro Giusti | Cancelled due to bad weather conditions | | |
| 6 | R1 | (France) Circuit Paul Ricard, Le Castellet | 2 October | (France) Esteban Masson | (France) Macéo Capietto | (France) Macéo Capietto | (France) Alessandro Giusti |
| 6 | R2 | (France) Circuit Paul Ricard, Le Castellet | 2 October | | (France) Owen Tangavelou | (France) Elliott Vayron | (Switzerland) Dario Cabanelas |
| 6 | R3 | (France) Circuit Paul Ricard, Le Castellet | 3 October | (France) Esteban Masson | (France) Alessandro Giusti | (France) Esteban Masson | (France) Alessandro Giusti |
| 7 | R1 | (France) Circuit de Nevers Magny-Cours, Magny-Cours | 23 October | (France) Esteban Masson | (Australia) Hugh Barter | (France) Esteban Masson | (France) Alessandro Giusti |
| 7 | R2 | (France) Circuit de Nevers Magny-Cours, Magny-Cours | 24 October | | (France) Owen Tangavelou | (France) Alessandro Giusti | (France) Alessandro Giusti |
| 7 | R3 | (France) Circuit de Nevers Magny-Cours, Magny-Cours | 24 October | (France) Esteban Masson | (Australia) Hugh Barter | (Australia) Hugh Barter | (France) Alessandro Giusti |

== Championship standings ==
Each driver's lowest scoring meeting was omitted from their final point tally. To have points dropped from a round, the driver must have competed in all three races.

Points were awarded as follows:

| Races | Position | | | | | | | | | | Bonus | |
| Races | 1st | 2nd | 3rd | 4th | 5th | 6th | 7th | 8th | 9th | 10th | PP | FL |
|---|---|---|---|---|---|---|---|---|---|---|---|---|
| Races 1 & 3 | 25 | 18 | 15 | 12 | 10 | 8 | 6 | 4 | 2 | 1 | **1** | 1 |
| Race 2 | 15 | 12 | 10 | 8 | 6 | 4 | 2 | 1 | | | – | 1 |

=== Drivers' standings – FFSA Academy ===
| Pos | Driver | NOG (France) | | | MAG1 (France) | | | HUN (Hungary) | | | LÉD (France) | | | MNZ (Italy) | | | LEC (France) | | | MAG2 (France) | | | Pts |
|---|---|---|---|---|---|---|---|---|---|---|---|---|---|---|---|---|---|---|---|---|---|---|---|
| 1 | (France) Esteban Masson | **1** | 6 | **3** | **4** | 1 | **1** | **1** | Ret | 2 | 2 | 6 | 5 | Ret | 4 | C | **2** | 18 | **1** | **1** | Ret | **13**† | 236 |
| 2 | (Australia) Hugh Barter | 4 | 7 | 1 | 2 | 3 | 2 | 8 | 7 | 7 | 4 | 4 | 3 | Ret | 6 | C | 4 | 6 | 3 | 2 | 5 | 1 | 213 |
| 3 | (France) Macéo Capietto | DNS | 8 | 2 | 1 | 13 | 3 | 2 | 8 | **1** | **1** | 7 | 2 | **2** | 2 | C | 1 | 5 | 4 | DSQ (Note: Disqualified from the round for causing a collision in Race 3.) | | | 203 |
| 4 | (France) Daniël Ligier | 3 | 5 | Ret | 3 | 4 | 5 | 5 | 2 | 15 | 3 | 3 | 6 | 3 | 3 | C | 3 | 3 | 5 | DSQ | Ret | 3 | 172 |
| 5 | (France) Owen Tangavelou | 2 | 11 | Ret | Ret | 10 | 4 | 4 | 5 | 4 | 6 | 5 | 4 | 4 | 5 | C | 7 | 2 | 7 | 5 | 8 | 5 | 160 |
| 6 | (France) Alessandro Giusti | 8 | 2 | 8 | 6 | 8 | 6 | 9 | 1 | 9 | 7 | Ret | 7 | 11 | 7 | **C** | 5 | 9 | 2 | 3 | 1 | 2 | 147 |
| 7 | (France) Gaël Julien | 7 | 3 | 5 | 7 | 6 | Ret | 7 | 3 | 5 | 5 | 13 | **1** | 5 | 8 | C | 6 | 7 | Ret | 4 | 3 | Ret | 141 |
| 8 | (Switzerland) Dario Cabanelas | 6 | 9 | 6 | 5 | 5 | 7 | 6 | 10 | 6 | 8 | 11 | 8 | Ret | 11 | C | 8 | 4 | 9 | 6 | 9 | 7 | 93 |
| 9 | (France) Enzo Géraci | 11 | 13 | 11 | 8 | 7 | 14 | 10 | 6 | 12 | 9 | 2 | 9 | 6 | Ret | C | Ret | 10 | 8 | 8 | 7 | 6 | 65 |
| 10 | (France) Noah Andy | 9 | 16† | 10 | 9 | 2 | 8 | 13 | 12 | 10 | 12 | 10 | 11 | 9 | Ret | C | Ret | 8 | 6 | 7 | Ret | 10 | 51 |
| 11 | (France) Pierre-Alexandre Provost | 12 | 10 | 14† | 10 | 12 | 10 | 11 | 11 | 11 | 10 | 1 | 12 | 8 | 9 | C | Ret | 11 | 16 | 9 | 2 | 8 | 50 |
| 12 | (United Kingdom) Aiden Neate | 5 | 4 | 4 | Ret | 9 | 12 | | | | | | | | | | | | | | | | 30 |
| 13 | (France) Angélina Favario | 13† | 14 | 13 | 13 | 11 | 13 | 14 | 13 | 14 | 14 | 12 | 14 | 10 | 12 | C | 16 | 17 | 14 | 10 | 11 | Ret | 9 |
| 14 | (Poland) Adam Szydłowski | Ret | 12 | 9 | 12 | Ret | 9 | | | | | | | | | | | | | | | | 2 |
| 15 | (Thailand) Thanapongpan Sutumno (Note: Sutumno was ineligible to score points at Le Castellet as he competed as a guest driver.) | 10 | 1 | 7 | | | | | | | | | | | | | 10 | 12 | 12 | | | | 0 |
| 16 | (India) Vignesh Kadarabad | 14† | 15 | 12 | 11 | 14 | 11 | | | | | | | | | | | | | | | | 0 |
Guest drivers ineligible to score points
| | (France) Elliott Vayron | | | | | | | 12 | 9 | 8 | | | | 1 | 1 | C | 9 | 1 | 17 | 11 | 4 | 4 | |
| | (Thailand) Tasanapol Inthraphuvasak | | | | | | | 3 | 4 | 3 | | | | | | | | | | | | | |
| | (France) Enzo Peugeot | | | | | | | | | | | | | | | | | | | 12 | 6 | 9 | |
| | (France) Enzo Richer | | | | | | | 15 | 14 | 13 | | | | 7 | Ret | C | 12 | 19† | 13 | Ret | 10 | 12 | |
| | (France) Pablo Sarrazin | | | | | | | | | | 11 | 8 | 10 | | | | | | | | | | |
| | (France) Paul Trojani | | | | | | | | | | 13 | 9 | 13 | | | | | | | | | | |
| | (France) Romain Andriolo | | | | | | | | | | | | | 12† | 10 | C | 11 | 13 | 15 | | | | |
| | (France) Louis Pelet | | | | | | | | | | | | | | | | 13 | 14 | 10 | | | | |
| | (United States) Luciano Morano | | | | | | | | | | | | | | | | 14 | 16 | 11 | Ret | Ret | 11 | |
| | (France) Paul Jerome | | | | | | | | | | | | | | | | 15 | 15 | Ret | | | | |

| Colour | Result |
|---|---|
| Gold | Winner |
| Silver | Second place |
| Bronze | Third place |
| Green | Points classification |
| Blue | Non-points classification |
| Blue | Non-classified finish (NC) |
| Purple | Retired, not classified (Ret) |
| Red | Did not qualify (DNQ) |
| Red | Did not pre-qualify (DNPQ) |
| Black | Disqualified (DSQ) |
| White | Did not start (DNS) |
| White | Withdrew (WD) |
| White | Race cancelled (C) |
| Blank | Did not practice (DNP) |
| Blank | Did not arrive (DNA) |
| Blank | Excluded (EX) |

**Bold** – Pole
Italics – Fastest Lap
† — Did not finish but classified

=== Drivers' standings – FIA Formula 4 ===
| Pos | Driver | NOG (France) | | | MAG1 (France) | | | HUN (Hungary) | | | LÉD (France) | | | MNZ (Italy) | | | LEC (France) | | | MAG2 (France) | | | Pts |
|---|---|---|---|---|---|---|---|---|---|---|---|---|---|---|---|---|---|---|---|---|---|---|---|
| 1 | (France) Esteban Masson | 1 | 4 | 3 | 4 | 1 | 1 | 1 | Ret | 2 | 2 | 4 | 5 | Ret | 3 | C | 2 | 8 | 1 | 1 | Ret | 5† | 233 |
| 2 | (Australia) Hugh Barter | 4 | 5 | 1 | 2 | 3 | 2 | 6 | 4 | 5 | 4 | 2 | 3 | Ret | 5 | C | 4 | 4 | 2 | 2 | 2 | 1 | 227 |
| 3 | (France) Macéo Capietto | DNS | 6 | 2 | 1 | 8 | 3 | 2 | 5 | 1 | 1 | 5 | 2 | 1 | 1 | C | 1 | 3 | 3 | DSQ | | | 210 |
| 4 | (France) Daniël Ligier | 3 | 3 | Ret | 3 | 4 | 5 | 4 | 1 | 8 | 3 | 1 | 6 | 2 | 2 | C | 3 | 2 | 4 | DSQ | Ret | 2 | 189 |
| 5 | (France) Owen Tangavelou | 2 | 7 | Ret | Ret | 6 | 4 | 3 | 3 | 3 | 6 | 3 | 4 | 3 | 4 | C | 6 | 1 | 6 | 4 | 3 | 3 | 181 |
| 6 | (France) Gaël Julien | 5 | 2 | 4 | 5 | 5 | Ret | 5 | 2 | 4 | 5 | 8 | 1 | 4 | 6 | C | 5 | 5 | Ret | 3 | 1 | Ret | 167 |
| 7 | (France) Noah Andy | 6 | 11† | 7 | 6 | 2 | 6 | 7 | 6 | 6 | 7 | 6 | 7 | 5 | Ret | C | Ret | 6 | 5 | 5 | Ret | 4 | 108 |
| 8 | (France) Angélina Favario | 8† | 9 | 9 | 9 | 7 | 9 | 8 | 7 | 7 | 8 | 7 | 8 | 6 | 7 | C | 7 | 7 | 7 | 6 | 4 | Ret | 68 |
| 9 | (Poland) Adam Szydłowski | Ret | 8 | 6 | 8 | Ret | 7 | | | | | | | | | | | | | | | | 10 |
| 10 | (India) Vignesh Kadarabad | 9† | 10 | 8 | 7 | 9 | 8 | | | | | | | | | | | | | | | | 10 |
| 11 | (Thailand) Thanapongpan Sutumno | 7 | 1 | 5 | | | | | | | | | | | | | | | | | | | 0 |

=== Juniors' standings ===
| Pos | Driver | NOG (France) | | | MAG1 (France) | | | HUN (Hungary) | | | LÉD (France) | | | MNZ (Italy) | | | LEC (France) | | | MAG2 (France) | | | Pts |
|---|---|---|---|---|---|---|---|---|---|---|---|---|---|---|---|---|---|---|---|---|---|---|---|
| 1 | (France) Alessandro Giusti | 3 | 1 | 3 | 2 | 3 | 1 | 2 | 1 | 2 | 1 | Ret | 1 | 3 | 1 | C | 1 | 2 | 1 | 1 | 1 | 1 | 311 |
| 2 | (Switzerland) Dario Cabanelas | 2 | 3 | 2 | 1 | 1 | 2 | 1 | 3 | 1 | 2 | 3 | 2 | Ret | 3 | C | 2 | 1 | 3 | 2 | 4 | 3 | 268 |
| 3 | (France) Enzo Géraci | 4 | 5 | 4 | 3 | 2 | 5 | 3 | 2 | 4 | 3 | 2 | 3 | 1 | Ret | C | Ret | 3 | 2 | 3 | 3 | 2 | 216 |
| 4 | (France) Pierre-Alexandre Provost | 5 | 4 | 5† | 4 | 5 | 3 | 4 | 4 | 3 | 4 | 1 | 4 | 2 | 2 | C | Ret | 4 | 4 | 4 | 2 | 4 | 201 |
| 5 | (United Kingdom) Aiden Neate | 1 | 2 | 1 | 5† | 4 | 4 | | | | | | | | | | | | | | | | 62 |
