= Korea Automobile Racing Association =

Korean nonprofit organization

The Korea Automobile Racing Association (KARA) (Korean: 대한자동차경주협회) is a non-profit organization that serves as the governing body of motor sport in South Korea. It was founded in May 1996 under Article 32 of the Civil Act, with the approval of the Ministry of Culture and Sports. Its primary objective is to promote automobile racing as a popular national sport.

KARA is the national sporting authority (ASN) exclusively delegated by the Fédération Internationale de l'Automobile (FIA, English: International Automobile Federation), which follows the principle of 'one country, one organization'. It is responsible for licensing racing drivers and officials in Korea, and for authorizing auto racing events.

KARA, along with over 120 other ASNs across more than 100 countries, is dedicated to fulfilling the mission of the FIA: ensuring that motor sport is conducted under the highest safety standards, fairness, and social responsibility. KARA also strives to develop Korean motor sport and foster local talent through education, training, and organizing races.

In 2015, KARA was officially recognized by the Korean Olympic Committee. The current president of the organization is Kwan Soo Shon.

On May 26, 2024, the 2024 KARA Gymkhana Championship was held at Inje Speedium.
