= Royal Automobile Club of Belgium =

Association of Belgian motorists

- Royal Automobile Club de Belgique
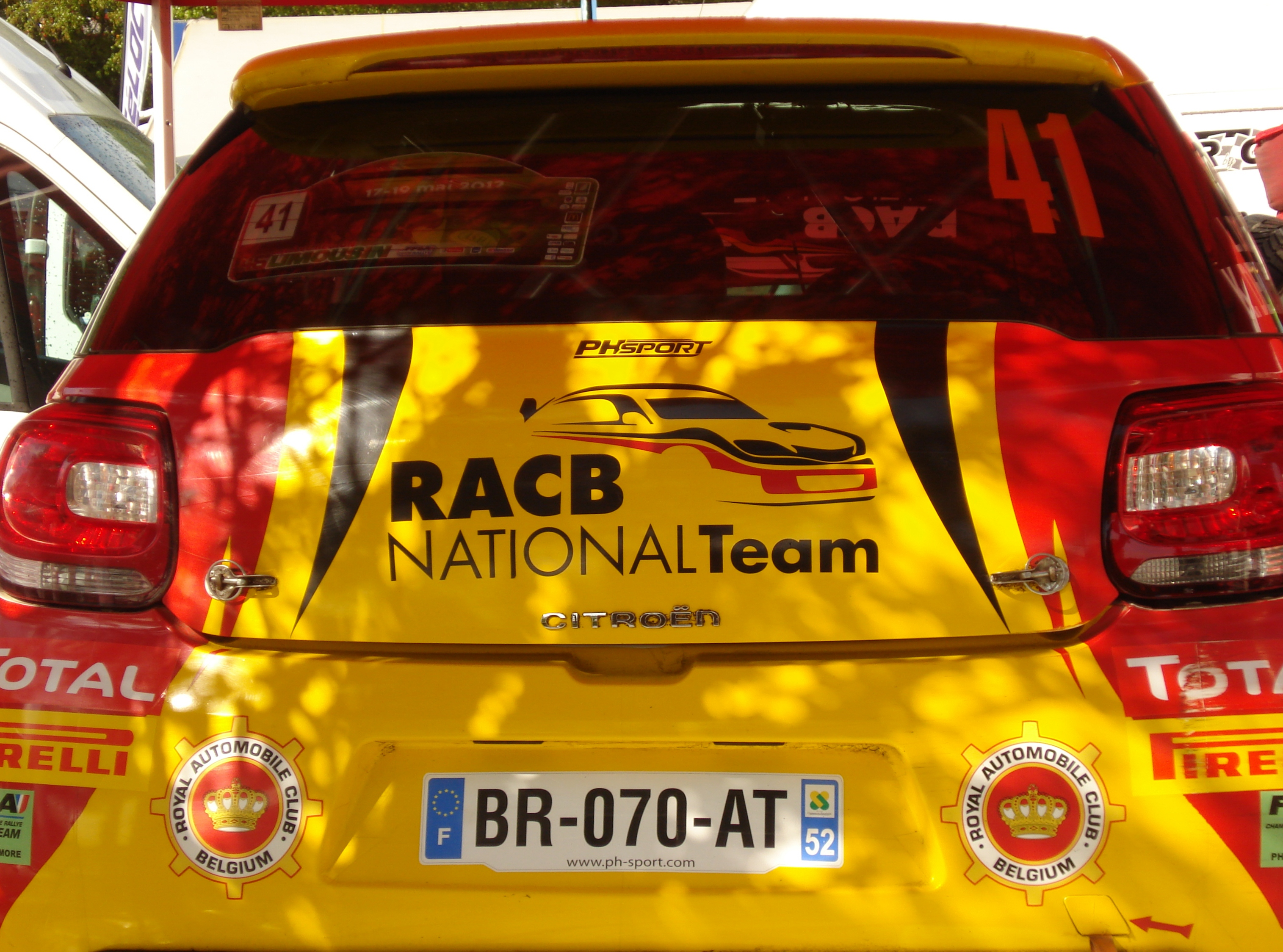
- DS3 of Kevin Demaerschalk at Rallye du Limousin 2012
- Formation: January 1896; 130 years ago
- Headquarters: Rue d'Arlon 53, 1040
- Location: Brussels, Belgium
- Leader: François Cornélis

The Royal Automobile Club of Belgium (RACB) is an association of Belgian motorists founded in January 1896. Their missions are focused on assistance, advice and sport.

== Championships ==
- Belcar
- Belgian Rally Championship
- Belgian Rallycross Championship
- Belgian Hill Climb Championship
- Belgian Karting Championship

== Presidents ==
- Count François van der Straten Ponthoz (1896–1902)
- Count Arthur de Hemricourt de Grunne (1902–1911)
- Robert d'Ursel (1911–1955)
- Amaury de Merode (1955–????)
- Pierre Ugeux (????–????)
- Count Gérard de Liedekerke (1979–1994) / John Dils (1991–1999)
- Philippe Roberti de Winghe (1997–2001) / Charles de Fierlant (1999–2001)
- Baron John J. Goossens (2001–2002)
- Baron François Cornélis (2002–)
