= Joseph Loake =

British racing driver (born 2005)

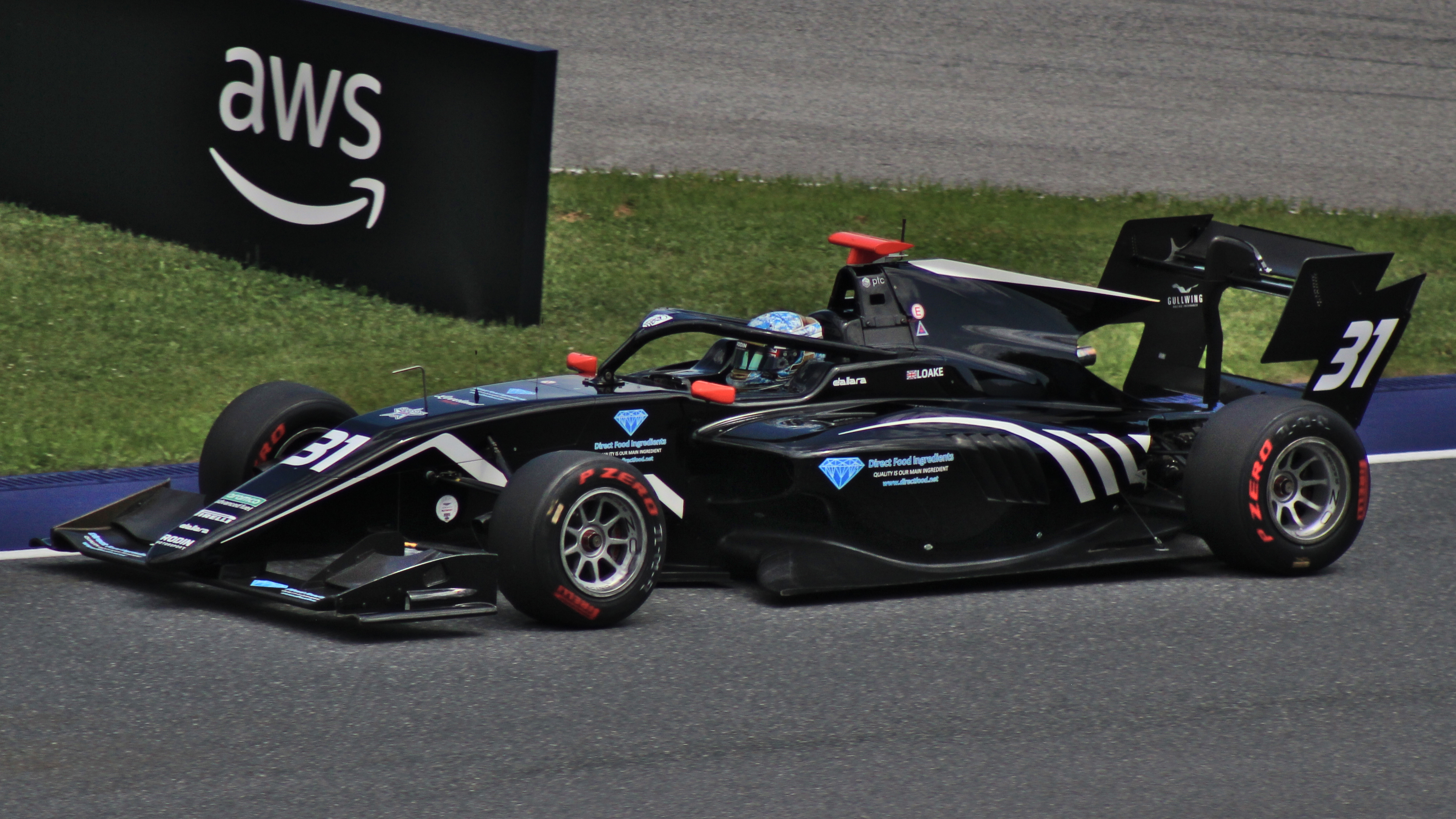
- Loake driving the Dallara F3 2019 during the 2024 Spielberg Formula 3 round
- Nationality: (United Kingdom) British
- Born: Joseph Thomas Eric Loake; 17 April 2005 (age 21) Macclesfield, Cheshire, United Kingdom

GTWC Europe Endurance Cup career
- Debut season: 2025
- Current team: Garage 59
- Categorisation: FIA Silver (2025–2026); FIA Gold (2027–)
- Car number: 59
- Starts: 6 (6 entries)
- Wins: 0
- Podiums: 1
- Poles: 0
- Fastest laps: 0
- Best finish: 7th in 2025

Previous series
- 2024 2023 2022 2021–2022 2019–2020: FIA Formula 3 Championship; GB3 Championship; Formula 4 UAE Championship; F4 British Championship; BRSCC Fiesta Junior Championship

Championship titles
- 2020: BRSCC Fiesta Junior Championship

Awards
- 2023: Aston Martin Autosport BRDC Award

Joseph Thomas Eric Loake (born 17 April 2005) is a British racing driver who competes in the GT World Challenge Europe Endurance Cup for Garage 59 as a McLaren factory driver. He previously competed in FIA Formula 3 for Rodin Motorsport, and won in GB3 and British F4. He is also the 2023 winner of the Aston Martin Autosport BRDC Award.

== Early career ==
=== Karting ===
Loake began karting in 2016 at the Macclesfield Kart Club, and spent most of his karting career in the NatSKA championship, joining Class 11 in 2016 following the championship win of his debut year (2015). In 2017, he moved up to Class 12 and came fourth in the championship, winning multiple races against often older and more practiced opponents. Of his early career, his most notable karting achievement was coming second in the NatSKA Class 15 Junior Rotax Championship.

=== BRSCC Fiesta Junior Championship ===
==== 2019 ====
Unlike other young drivers who started out in Formula 4 or Formula Ford, Loake made his car racing debut in 2019 in the BRSCC Fiesta Junior Championship, a support series for the TCR UK Touring Car Championship. The series was designed as an opportunity to launch drivers (typically aged fourteen–seventeen) into their careers within circuit racing. Despite missing the opening round of the championship, Loake came second in the championship, and took a double win at Anglesey.

==== 2020 ====
In 2020, Loake returned to BRSCC Fiesta's Junior Series, where he put in an impressive performance, winning eight of eight races, taking the championship title at Croft, the young racer won a staggering 50 points ahead of his nearest rival. At the end of the season, Loake was nominated for the Teen Racer of the Year and came fourth overall.

=== Formula 4 ===
==== 2021 ====
Loake's first taste of Formula 4 machinery was in late November 2020 at Snetterton Circuit. He made his debut with single-seaters in the 2021 F4 British Championship for JHR Developments, partnering Abbi Pulling, McKenzy Cresswell and Matthew Rees.

On his debut weekend at Thruxton Circuit, he scored no points between his first two races. Despite the rocky start, Loake drover better and he won in the rain, finishing nearly one second ahead of his teammate, McKenzy Cresswell. The second and third rounds were uneventful, as he scored inconsistent points but managed to get two fastest laps in the third race weekend at Brands Hatch. The fourth round at Oulton Park proved to be another weekend to remember for Loake, as he scored two podiums in the race weekend, taking third place in the first race and a dominant win in the final race.

After quiet a few rounds, he won the chaotic final race at Silverstone Circuit, as only eleven out of seventeen cars finished the race. Loake capitalised on the misfortune of other drivers and took his third race win in the series. For the final two rounds, he retired from most of them, and only had two points finishes, a fourth place in the first race at Donington Park and a final podium in the first race at Brands Hatch. He finished the season in sixth place, with 199 points.

==== 2022 ====
During the start of 2022, Loake drove for JHR Developments in the Formula 4 UAE Championship in order to gain extra mileage of the new Tatuus F4-T421. He entered eight races and scored no points, finishing the championship in 27th place.

Loake was retained for the 2022 F4 British Championship at JHR Developments, with new teammates, Georgi Dimitrov and Noah Lisle. Hoping to turn over the unfortunate results of the start of the year, he got to work on his pursuit of the title. Scoring two podiums in the first two rounds, and consistently scoring points throughout the season he was off to a strong start. Balanced with a podium-less third and fourth round at Thruxton Circuit and Oulton Park, little points and two retirements seemed to dampen his chances at the title. Loake's luck however turned to improve at the familiar Croft Circuit, where he attained podium finish in the second race.

Knockhill Circuit was a notable round of Loake's season, as in the first race he beat pole sitter and McLaren Junior Driver, Ugo Ugochukwu. Loake scored no points in the second race, but bounced back with a podium in the final race. In the next round at Snetterton Circuit, Loake claimed another win in the reversed grid format at the second race of the round.

The next two rounds at Thruxton Circuit and Silverstone Circuit were uneventful, as Loake scored consistent points and a fastest lap and podium in Silverstone, but the final round of Brands Hatch was the highlight of his season, getting his first two poles of the season, getting a double pole and converting them into wins, as he also got double fastest laps in his winning races. Following the strong final round of the season he finished fifth in the championship.

=== GB3 Championship ===
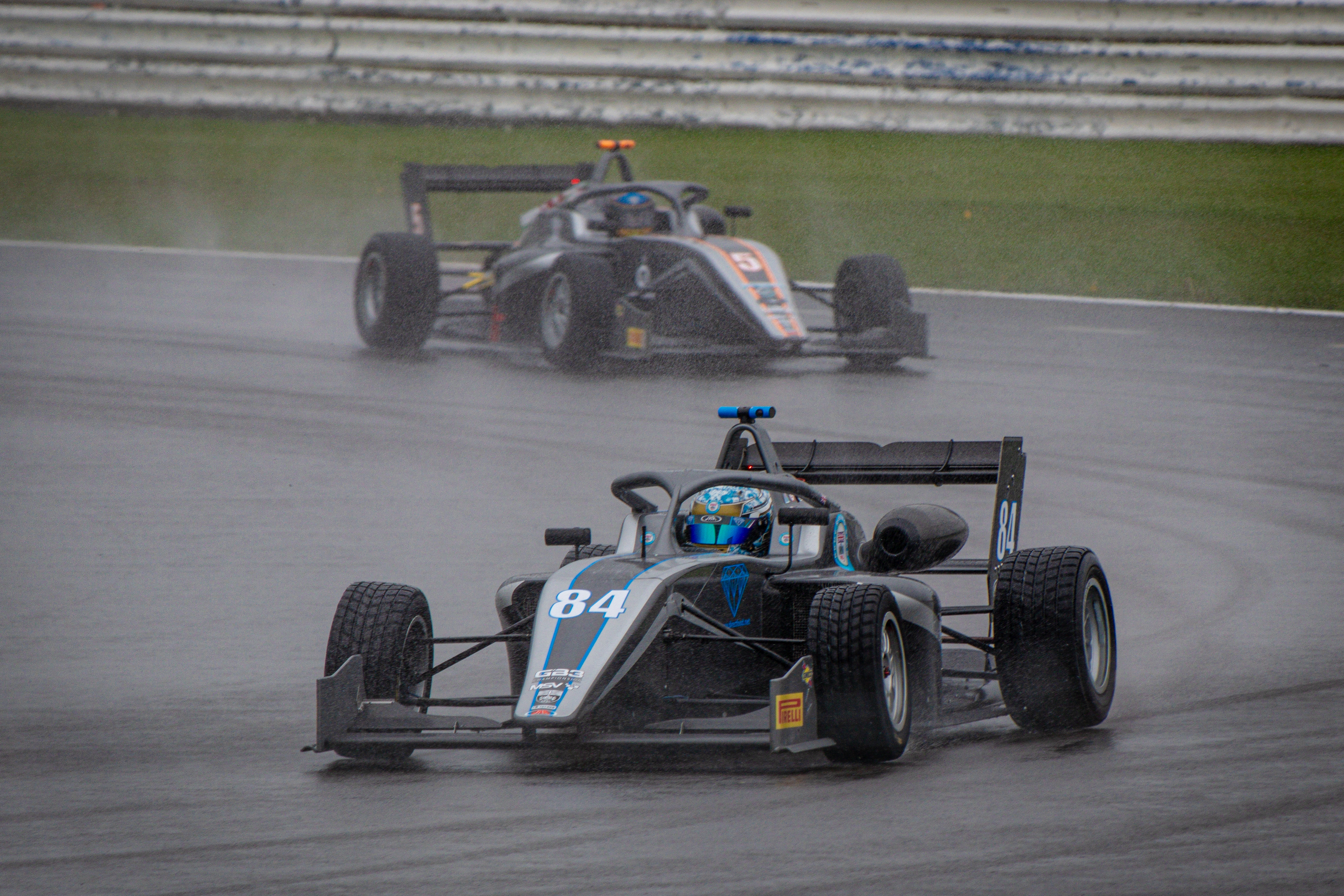
Loake racing in the 2023 GB3 Championship at Silverstone

For the 2023 season, Loake was promoted to the GB3 Championship following his decision to stick with JHR Developments. Loake was paired with David Morales and his former teammate, Matthew Rees. He kicked off his debut round at Oulton Park with a hat-trick in the first round, followed by another pole in the next round, which was converted to a podium finish.

Loake's performance continued at Silverstone Circuit where he won two bouts, and again at Spa-Francorchamps where he scored another podium. The momentum continued for the next two rounds, leading to his benchmark performance at Brands Hatch, where he scored his second hat-trick of the season, grabbing another podium the next race.

Loake achieved his final podium of the season in Circuit Zandvoort. At the final round of the season in Donington Park, Loake was tipped for the title alongside Callum Voisin and Alex Dunne.

While Loake finished the first two races with points to his name, he was forced to retire the third, relegating his contention for the title; the win eventually going to his competitor Voisin. Loake ended his maiden season in third place with 417 points.

=== FIA Formula 3 Championship ===
In 2024, Loake was promoted to FIA Formula 3 with Rodin Motorsport. The only points finishes of the season for him were at the fourth round at Monaco, he achieved his highest finish of fifth place in the sprint race, and was ninth in the feature race. Loake finished 26th in the drivers' championship with a total of eight points.

=== USF Pro 2000 Championship ===
In June 2025, Loake made his debut in the 2025 USF Pro 2000 Championship with Turn 3 Motorsport at Road America.

=== Formula One ===
In December 2023, Loake was named as the winner of the Aston Martin Autosport BRDC Young Driver of the Year Award for 2023, thus winning a test drive with the Aston Martin Aramco Formula One Team. He successfully completed the test in the Aston Martin AMR22 in August 2024 at Silverstone Circuit.

== Sportscar career ==
=== 2025 ===
Loake made his venture into sportscar racing in the 2025 GT World Challenge Europe Endurance Cup with McLaren-affiliated Garage 59, who fielded a Pro entry consisting of him and Germans Benjamin Goethe and Marvin Kirchhöfer. The trio got a podium in the second round at Monza, and started the 24 Hours of Spa on pole position courtesy of Kirchhöfer. They finished the championship seventh in the overall standings.

=== 2026 ===
In January 2026, Loake was promoted to McLaren factory driver, and continued with Garage 59 for his sophomore year in the GT World Challenge Europe Endurance Cup, still in the Pro class and partnering Kirchhöfer and Briton Dean MacDonald. His best result was a fifth in the first round at Circuit Paul Ricard, he ended his sophomore campaign in twelfth.

He also replaced Kirchhöfer and partnered MacDonald in the final round of the Sprint Cup at Barcelona. The duo recorded fourth in race one but, as Loake was a guest driver, he was ineligible for points.

== Racing record ==
=== Racing career summary ===
Season	Series	Team	Races	Wins	Poles	F/Laps	Podiums	Points	Position
2019	BRSCC Fiesta Junior Championship		?	?	?	?	?	446	2nd
2020	BRSCC Fiesta Junior Championship		8	8	4	4	8	412	1st
2021	F4 British Championship	JHR Developments	30	3	0	3	5	199	6th
2022	Formula 4 UAE Championship	JHR Developments	8	0	0	0	0	0	27th
2022	F4 British Championship	JHR Developments	30	4	2	4	9	271	5th
2023	GB3 Championship	JHR Developments	23	4	3	3	8	417	3rd
2024	FIA Formula 3 Championship	Rodin Motorsport	20	0	0	0	0	8	26th
2025	GT World Challenge Europe Endurance Cup	Garage 59	5	0	1	0	1	39	7th
2025	USF Pro 2000 Championship	Turn 3 Motorsport	3	0	0	0	0	33	23rd
2026	GT World Challenge Europe Endurance Cup	Garage 59	5	0	0	1	0	21	12th
2026	GT World Challenge Europe Sprint Cup	Garage 59	2	0	0	0	0	0	NC†
2026	International GT Open	Greystone GT	2	0	0	1	0	5	38th
2026-27	Asian Le Mans Series - GT3	Garage 59							

^{†} As Loake was a guest driver, he was ineligible for points.

* Season still in progress.

=== Complete F4 British Championship results ===
(key) (Races in bold indicate pole position) (Races in italics indicate fastest lap)

Year	Team	1	2	3	4	5	6	7	8	9	10	11	12	13	14	15	16	17	18	19	20	21	22	23	24	25	26	27	28	29	30	DC	Points
2021	JHR Developments	THR1; 1; 15	THR1; 2; 10	THR1; 3; 1	SNE; 1; 7	SNE; 2 Ret	SNE; 3; 9	BHI; 1; 14^{1}	BHI; 2 Ret	BHI; 3; 7	OUL; 1; 3	OUL; 2; 13^{4}	OUL; 3; 1	KNO; 1; 5	KNO; 2; 6^{3}	KNO; 3 Ret	THR2; 1 Ret	THR2; 2; 9	THR2; 3; 6	CRO; 1; 5	CRO; 2; 10^{1}	CRO; 3; 7	SIL; 1 Ret	SIL; 2; 4^{7}	SIL; 3; 1	DON; 1; 4	DON; 2 Ret	DON; 3; 13	BHGP; 1; 2	BHGP; 2 Ret	BHGP; 3 Ret	6th	199
2022	JHR Developments	DON; 1; 5	DON; 2; 3	DON; 3; 9	BHI; 1; 2	BHI; 2; 5^{1}	BHI; 3; 10	THR1; 1; 4	THR1; 2; 8	THR1; 3 Ret	OUL; 1; 7	OUL; 2 Ret	OUL; 3; 9	CRO; 1; 8	CRO; 2; 2^{2}	CRO; 3 Ret	KNO; 1; 1	KNO; 2; 10	KNO; 3; 3	SNE; 1; 5	SNE; 2; 1^{2}	SNE; 3; 8	THR2; 1; 6	THR2; 2; 4^{1}	THR2; 3; 4	SIL; 1 Ret	SIL; 2; 5^{2}	SIL; 3; 2	**BHGP**; **1**; 1	BHGP; 2; 7^{3}	**BHGP**; **3**; 1	5th	271

=== Complete Formula 4 UAE Championship results ===
(key) (Races in bold indicate pole position) (Races in italics indicate fastest lap)

Year	Team	1	2	3	4	5	6	7	8	9	10	11	12	13	14	15	16	17	18	19	20	DC	Points
2022	JHR Developments	YAS1; 1	YAS1; 2	YAS1; 3	YAS1; 4	DUB1; 1; 16	DUB1; 2 Ret	DUB1; 3; 18	DUB1; 4; 24	DUB2; 1; 18	DUB2; 2; 11	DUB2; 3; 23	DUB2; 4; 16	DUB3; 1	DUB3; 2	DUB3; 3	DUB3; 4	YAS2; 1	YAS2; 2	YAS2; 3	YAS2; 4	27th	0

=== Complete GB3 Championship results ===
(key) (Races in bold indicate pole position) (Races in italics indicate fastest lap)

Year	Team	1	2	3	4	5	6	7	8	9	10	11	12	13	14	15	16	17	18	19	20	21	22	23	24	DC	Points
2023	JHR Developments	**OUL**; **1**; 1	**OUL**; **2**; 3	OUL; 3; 13^{12}	SIL1; 1; 1	SIL1; 2; 1	SIL1; 3; 20	SPA; 1; 9	SPA; 2; 10	SPA; 3; 2^{10}	SNE; 1; 6	SNE; 2; 22	SNE; 3; 10^{8}	SIL2; 1; 6	SIL2; 2; 4	SIL2; 3 C	**BRH**; **1**; 1	BRH; 2; 2	BRH; 3; 15^{9}	ZAN; 1; 3	ZAN; 2; 5	ZAN; 3; 13^{8}	DON; 1; 10	DON; 2; 8	DON; 3 Ret	3rd	417

=== Complete FIA Formula 3 Championship results ===
(key) (Races in bold indicate pole position) (Races in italics indicate fastest lap)

Year	Entrant	1	2	3	4	5	6	7	8	9	10	11	12	13	14	15	16	17	18	19	20	DC	Points
2024	Rodin Motorsport	BHR; SPR; 27	BHR; FEA; 23	MEL; SPR; 14	MEL; FEA; Ret	IMO; SPR; 21	IMO; FEA; 25	MON; SPR; 5	MON; FEA; 9	CAT; SPR; 15	CAT; FEA; 22	RBR; SPR; 19	RBR; FEA; 24	SIL; SPR; 15	SIL; FEA; 24	HUN; SPR; 26	HUN; FEA; 26	SPA; SPR; 11	SPA; FEA; 25	MNZ; SPR; 15	MNZ; FEA; 19	26th	8

=== Complete GT World Challenge Europe results ===
==== GT World Challenge Europe Endurance Cup ====
(key) (Races in bold indicate pole position) (Races in italics indicate fastest lap)

Year	Entrant	Car	Class	1	2	3	4	5	6	7	DC	Points
2025	Garage 59	McLaren 720S GT3 Evo	Pro	LEC; Ret	MNZ; 2	SPA; 6H; 22	SPA; 12H; 4	**SPA**; **24H**; 6	NÜR; 8	BAR; Ret	7th	39
2026	Garage 59	McLaren 720S GT3 Evo	Pro	LEC; 5	MNZ; Ret	SPA; 6H; 13	SPA; 12H; Ret	SPA; 24H; Ret	NÜR; 10	ALG; 6	12th	21

* Season still in progress.

==== GT World Challenge Europe Sprint Cup ====
(key) (Races in bold indicate pole position) (Races in italics indicate fastest lap)

Year	Entrant	Car	Class	1	2	3	4	5	6	7	8	9	10	Pos.	Points
2026	Garage 59	McLaren 720S GT3 Evo	Pro	BRH; 1	BRH; 2	MIS; 1	MIS; 2	MAG; 1	MAG; 2	ZAN; 1	ZAN; 2	CAT; 1; 4	CAT; 2; 9	NC‡	0‡

=== American open-wheel racing results ===
==== USF Pro 2000 Championship ====
(key) (Races in bold indicate pole position) (Races in italics indicate fastest lap)

Year	Team	1	2	3	4	5	6	7	8	9	10	11	12	13	14	15	16	17	18	Position	Points
2025	Turn 3 Motorsport	STP; 1	STP; 2	LOU; 1	LOU; 2	LOU; 3	IMS; 1	IMS; 2	IMS; 3	IRP	ROA; 1; 5	ROA; 2; 8	ROA; 3; 18	MOH; 1	MOH; 2	TOR; 1	TOR; 2	POR; 1	POR; 2	23rd	33

* Season still in progress.
