= Matías Zagazeta =

Peruvian racing driver (born 2003)

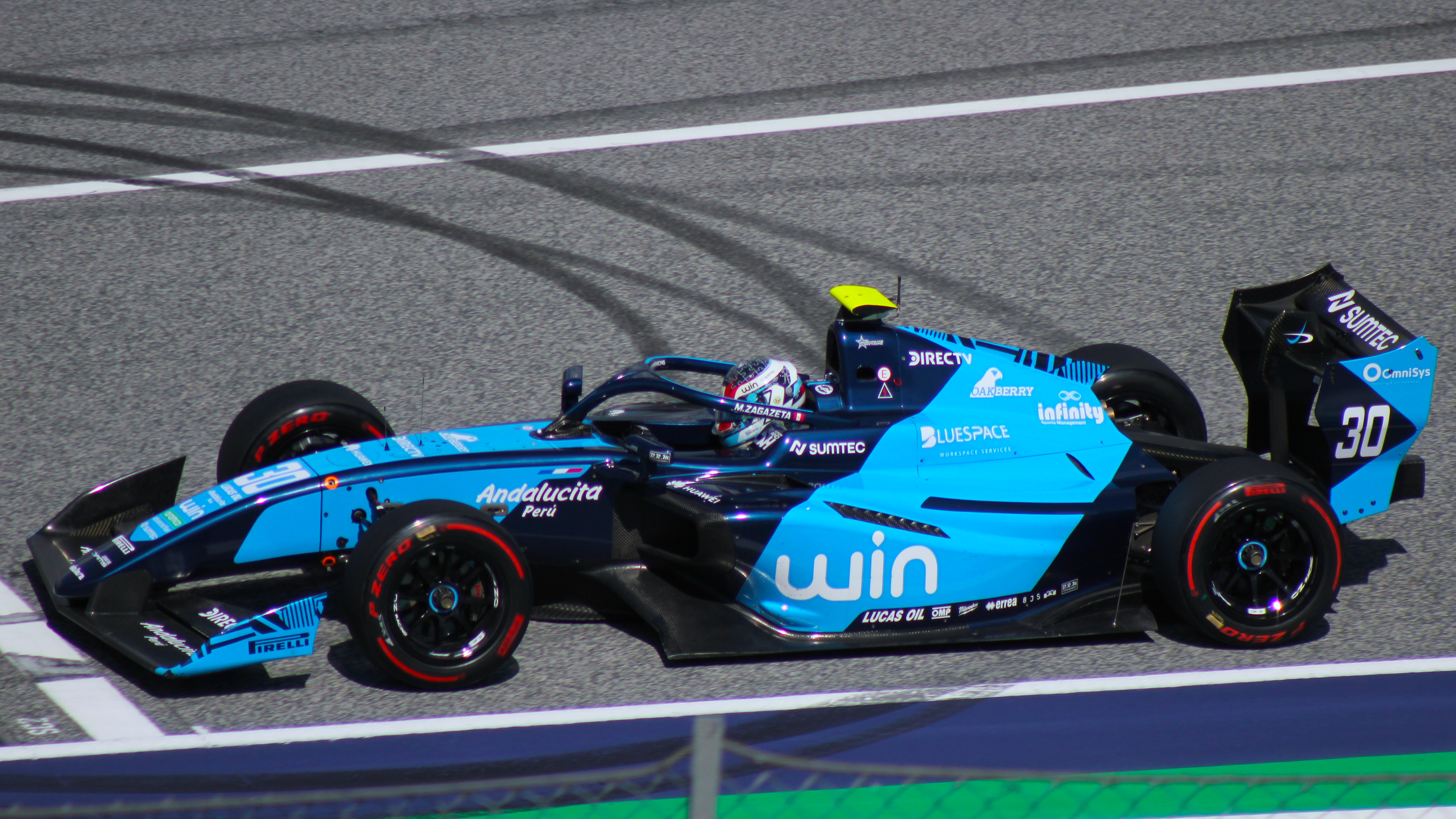
- Zagazeta driving the Dallara F3 2025 during the 2025 Spielberg Formula 3 round
- Nationality: (Peru) Peruvian
- Born: 8 September 2003 (age 23) Lima, Peru

GT World Challenge Europe career
- Debut season: 2026
- Current team: AF Corse
- Categorisation: FIA Silver
- Car number: 51
- Starts: 0
- Wins: 1
- Podiums: 2
- Poles: 0
- Fastest laps: 0
- Best finish: TBD in 2026

Previous series
- 2025 2024–2025 2023 2022–2023 2021 2020–2021: FIA Formula 3 Championship; FR Oceania Championship; FIA Formula 3 Championship; FR Middle East Championship; FR European Championship; Formula 4 UAE; F4 British Championship

Matías Zagazeta (born 8 September 2003) is a Peruvian racing driver who is set to compete in the GT World Challenge Europe for AF Corse.

Zagazeta is the 2021 F4 British Championship runner-up, and debuted in FIA Formula 3 in 2024 with Jenzer. He raced in the 2025 season of Formula 3 for DAMS.

== Early and personal life ==
Zagazeta was born on 8 September 2003 in Lima, where he grew up. He moved to England at the end of 2019 just before his single-seater debut in the 2020 F4 British Championship.

Away from racing, Zagazeta is an Arsenal F.C. supporter.

== Early career ==
=== Karting ===
A three-time national karting champion having begun his career at the age of eight, Zagazeta quickly switched to international competition, primarily in America. He crossed the pond in 2017, competing in various IAME and WSK events, as well as the CIK-FIA Karting European Championship. He finished 14th in the X30 Senior class of the IAME Winter Cup in 2019, his last year of karting.

=== Formula 4 ===
==== 2020 ====
After testing Formula 4 machinery for the first time in late 2019, Zagazeta signed with British F4 giants Carlin for his single-seater debut the following year. Having left behind all his family in Lima and racing in unfamiliar tracks, Zagazeta endured a difficult season, eventually only scoring 34 points. He finished a lowly 12th in the championship, as the second last full-time driver, far from his teammates Zak O'Sullivan and Christian Mansell, second and seventh respectively.

==== 2021 ====
Zagazeta started 2021 by racing part-time in the Formula 4 UAE Championship with Xcel Motorsport, for the opening two rounds. He got a best finish of fourth from eight races, and finished 14th in the standings with 32 points. Switching to Phinsys by Argenti for his second British F4 campaign, Zagazeta's results improved drastically, as he got a maiden single-seater podium in the season opener at Thruxton. Two rounds later, Zagazeta earned his maiden single-seater victory during the final race in Brands Hatch. His best weekend came in Knockhill with a double victory. A double rostrum followed in the second Thruxton round, although he lost the victory in the first race after a corner cut inflicted a one-second penalty. Zagazeta took a double pole in Silverstone and won the opening race, and sat at the top of the standings with just two rounds to go despite a race retirement in the third race. He would eventually lose out on the title to JHR's Matthew Rees by 25 points, after only two further podiums in the remaining two podiums.

=== Formula Regional ===
==== 2022 ====
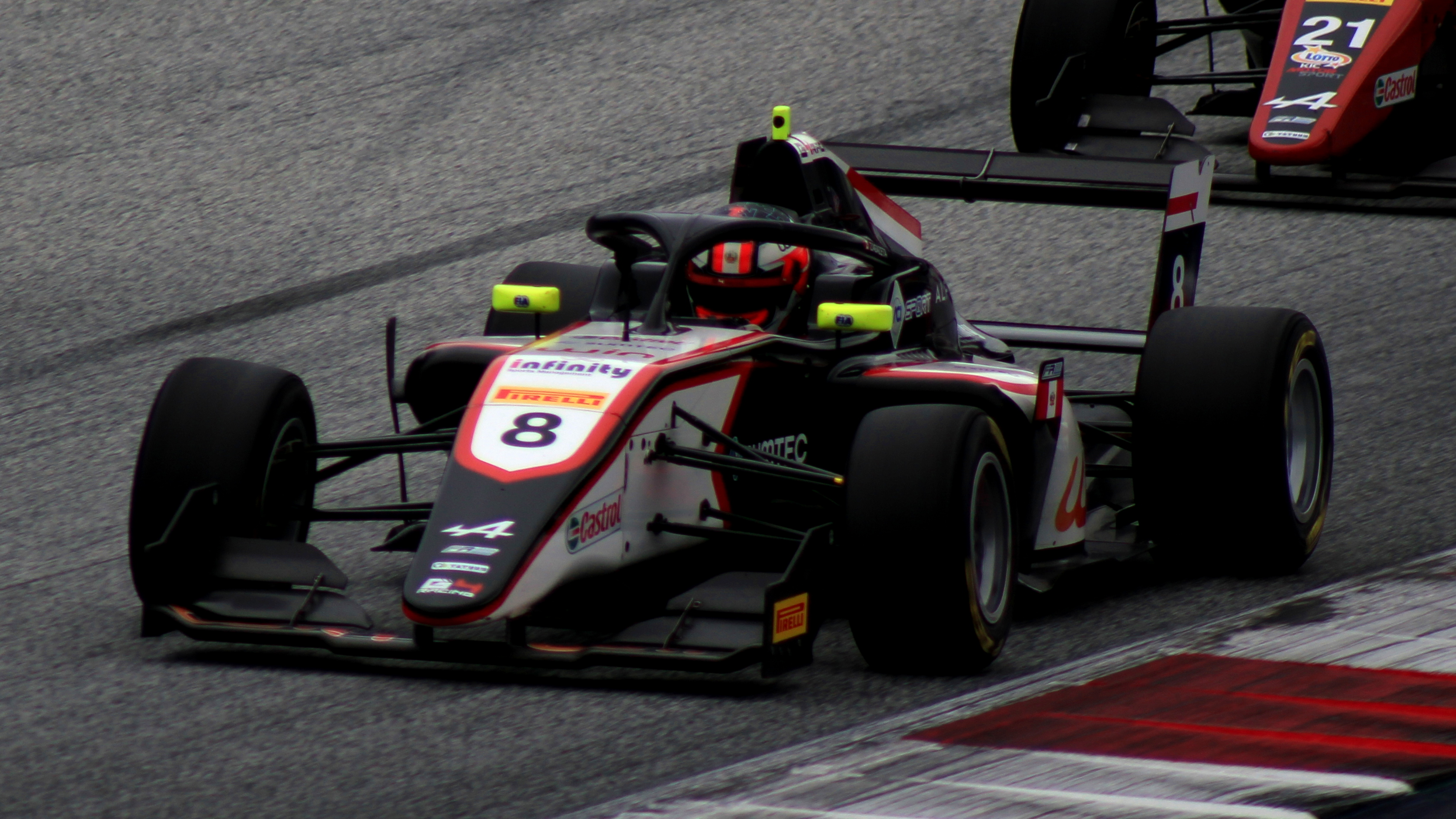
Zagazeta racing in the 2022 Formula Regional European Championship at the Red Bull Ring.

In 2022, Zagazeta joined G4 Racing to progress into the Formula Regional European Championship. He immediately impressed in pre-season testing, leading the final session of the Barcelona collective test. However, this was a false dawn, as Zagazeta struggled throughout the season; he finished 32nd in the standings with no points scored, his best finish being a 19th in Paul Ricard.

==== 2023 ====
Zagazeta partook in the 2023 Formula Regional Middle East Championship with R-ace GP during the first three rounds. He took a second place podium during the opening race in Dubai. Zagazeta took three more points finishes in the remaining races and placed 17th in the standings with 28 points.

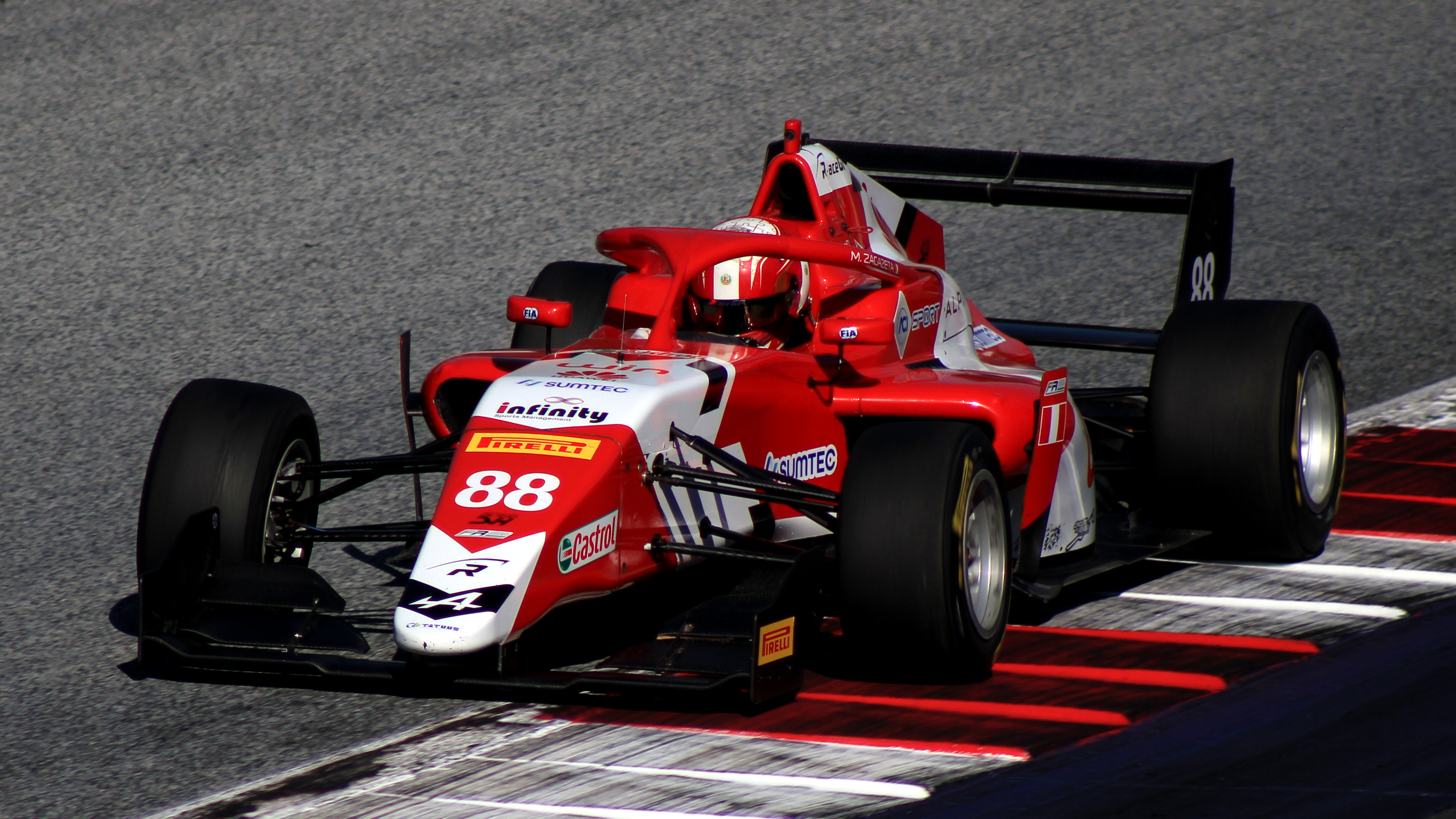
Zagazeta racing in the 2023 Formula Regional European Championship at the Red Bull Ring.

For his main campaign, Zagazeta remained in the Formula Regional European Championship, but moved to R-ace GP. He opened his account with fifth place in the Imola opener, but only returned to the points again during the penultimate round in Zandvoort. Zagazeta finished the season 22nd in the standings with 11 points, far behind teammates Martinius Stenshorne and Tim Tramnitz.

In November 2023, Zagazeta competed in the Macau Grand Prix with Jenzer Motorsport, he finished the race in 17th place.

==== 2025 ====
During the 2025 pre-season, Zagazeta competed in the Formula Regional Oceania Championship with M2 Competition. He impressed in the opening round in Taupo, taking a win and a further podium. He next won again during the first race in Teretonga, whilst finishing third in the final race. By scoring in all but one race, Zagazeta finished fifth in the standings, with 244 points.

=== FIA Formula 3 Championship ===
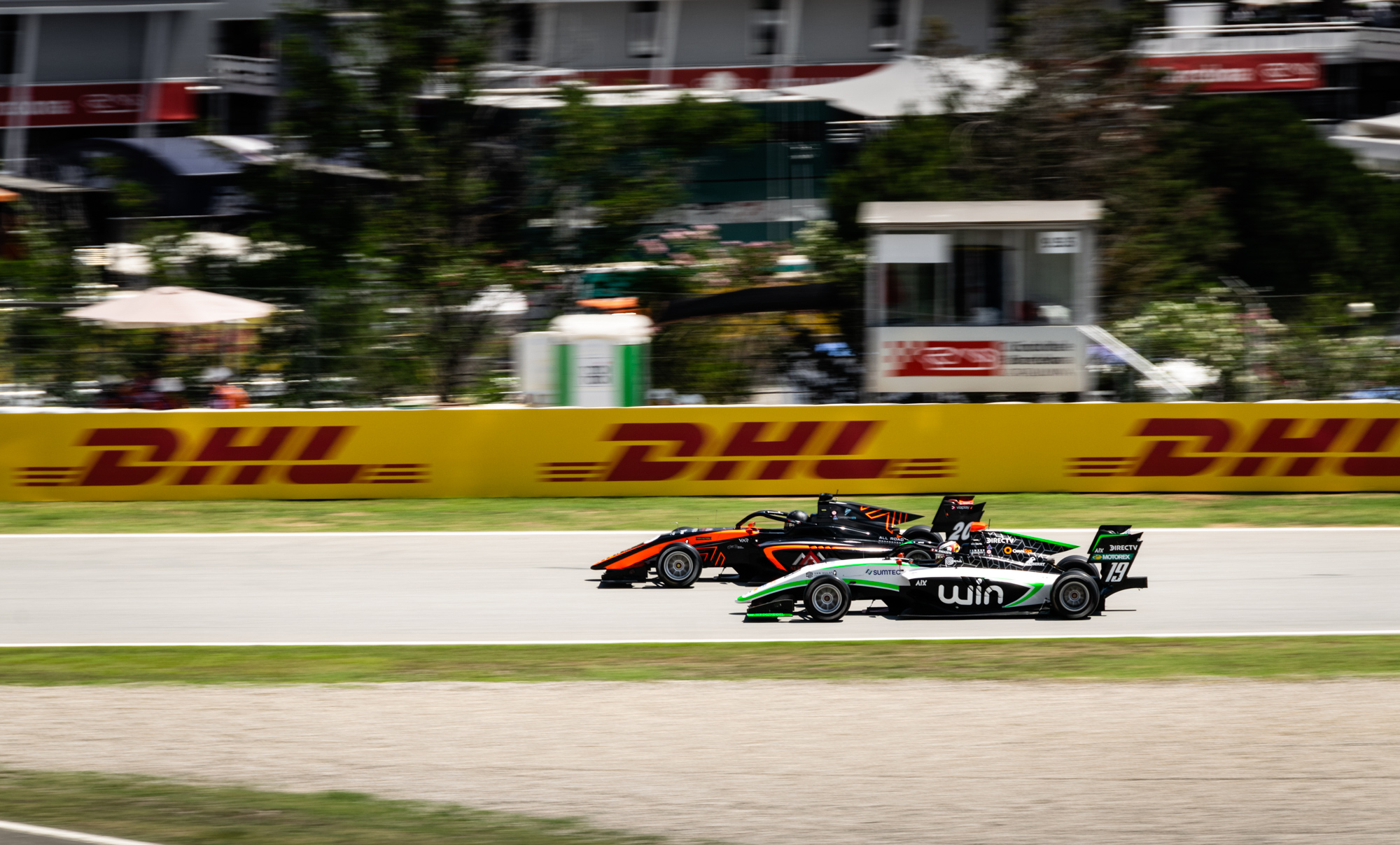
Zagazeta racing Noel León in the 2024 FIA Formula 3 Championship at Circuit de Barcelona-Catalunya.

Zagazeta took part in the FIA Formula 3 post-season test in 2022, driving for Charouz Racing System during the final two days.

The following year, Zagazeta partook in post-season testing at Jerez with Jenzer Motorsport.

==== 2024 ====
In 2024, Jenzer Motorsport signed Zagazeta to participate with them in the full 2024 FIA Formula 3 season. He missed the Monaco round due to appendicitis and was replaced by James Hedley. In general, he had a difficult season, but managed to secure his first podium in the series with a third place during the Silverstone sprint race; it was Jenzer's only podium of the year. That was his only points of the season, as Zagazeta finished 25th in the standings, behind teammates Max Esterson and Charlie Wurz.

==== 2025 ====
Zagazeta remained in Formula 3 for 2025, but switched to new entrants DAMS Lucas Oil as Jenzer Motorsport departed the championship. He began the season with points in fifth place during the Melbourne sprint race, having started in second. However, the team proved to be the least competitive throughout the campaign, and Zagazeta had to wait until the final round in Monza to score again, finishing fourth place in the sprint after qualifying seventh. He was set for more points the next day, but contact with another driver forced him off-track, sustaining race-ending damage. Zagazeta finished the season 24th in the standings with 13 points, behind teammate Christian Ho but well ahead of Nicola Lacorte.

== Sportscar career ==
In November 2025, Zagazeta joined the FIA World Endurance Championship rookie test at the Bahrain International Circuit, driving the Ferrari 296 GT3 for AF Corse.

Zagazeta entered the GT World Challenge Europe series in 2026 with AF Corse, partnering Tommaso Mosca in the Gold Cup class of the Sprint Cup, while driving in the Silver Cup category of the Endurance Cup alongside Jef Machiels and Gilles Stadsbader.

== Karting record ==
=== Karting career summary ===
Season	Series	Team	Position
2014	Argentine championship - Promocional		30th
2015	SKUSA SuperNationals XIX - TaG Cadet	BBR Karting	56th
2017	IAME International Open - X30 Junior		14th
2017	SKUSA SuperNationals XXI - X30 Junior	BBR Karting	12th
2017	IAME Euro Series - X30 Junior		13th
2017	IAME International Final - X30 Junior		18th
2017	CIK-FIA Karting Academy Trophy		21st
2018	WSK Champions Cup - OK	Lennox Racing Team	24th
2018	23° South Garda Winter Cup - [[[Original Kart|OK]]	Lennox Racing Team	33rd
2018	WSK Super Master Series - OK	Lennox Racing Team	58th
2018	CIK-FIA European Championship - OK	Lennox Racing Team	45th
2019	IAME Euro Series - X30 Senior	Fusion Motorsport	
2019	IAME Winter Cup - X30 Senior	Fusion Motorsport	14th
2019	British Kart Championship - X30 Senior	Fusion Motorsport	39th
2019	CIK-FIA European Championship - OK	Forza Racing	

== Racing record ==
=== Racing career summary ===
Season	Series	Team	Races	Wins	Poles	F/Laps	Podiums	Points	Position
2020	F4 British Championship	Carlin	26	0	0	0	0	34	12th
2021	Formula 4 UAE Championship	Xcel Motorsport	8	0	0	0	0	32	14th
2021	F4 British Championship	Phinsys by Argenti	30	4	4	3	11	306	**2nd**
2022	Formula Regional European Championship	G4 Racing	19	0	0	0	0	0	32nd
2023	Formula Regional Middle East Championship	R-ace GP	9	0	0	0	1	28	17th
2023	Formula Regional European Championship	R-ace GP	20	0	0	0	0	12	22nd
2023	Macau Grand Prix	Jenzer Motorsport	1	0	0	0	0	N/A	17th
2024	FIA Formula 3 Championship	Jenzer Motorsport	18	0	0	0	1	8	25th
2025	Formula Regional Oceania Championship	M2 Competition	15	2	1	1	4	244	5th
2025	FIA Formula 3 Championship	DAMS Lucas Oil	19	0	0	0	0	13	24th
2026	GT World Challenge Europe Endurance Cup	AF Corse	5	0	0	0	0	0	NC
2026	GT World Challenge Europe Sprint Cup	AF Corse	10	0	0	0	0	13	21st

* Season still in progress.

=== Complete F4 British Championship results ===
(key) (Races in bold indicate pole position) (Races in italics indicate fastest lap)

Year	Team	1	2	3	4	5	6	7	8	9	10	11	12	13	14	15	16	17	18	19	20	21	22	23	24	25	26	27	28	29	30	DC	Points
2020	Carlin	DON; 1; 13	DON; 2; 9	DON; 3; 5	BHGP; 1; 10	BHGP; 2; 8	BHGP; 3; 11	OUL; 1; 12	OUL; 2; 13	OUL; 3; 11	KNO; 1; 13	KNO; 2; 9	KNO; 3; 13	THR; 1 Ret	THR; 2; 9	THR; 3; 11	SIL; 1; 6	SIL; 2; 11	SIL; 3; 10	CRO; 1; 12	CRO; 2; 9	SNE; 1; 12	SNE; 2; 11	SNE; 3; 11	BHI; 1; 9	BHI; 2 Ret	BHI; 3; 11					12th	34
2021	Phinsys by Argenti	THR1; 1; 3	THR1; 2; 9	THR1; 3 Ret	SNE; 1; 9	SNE; 2; 13	SNE; 3; 6	BHI; 1; 12^{5}	BHI; 2; 4	BHI; 3; 1	OUL; 1 Ret	OUL; 2 Ret	OUL; 3; 2	**KNO**; **1**; 1	KNO; 2; 9^{7}	**KNO**; **3**; 1	THR2; 1; 2	THR2; 2; 12^{3}	THR2; 3; 2	CRO; 1; 4	CRO; 2; 7^{5}	CRO; 3; 2	**SIL**; **1**; 1	SIL; 2; 11^{6}	**SIL**; **3** Ret	DON; 1; 6	DON; 2; 6^{3}	DON; 3; 2	BHGP; 1 Ret	BHGP; 2; 9^{3}	BHGP; 3; 2	2nd	306

=== Complete Formula 4 UAE Championship results ===
(key) (Races in bold indicate pole position) (Races in italics indicate fastest lap)

Year	Team	1	2	3	4	5	6	7	8	9	10	11	12	13	14	15	16	17	18	19	20	Pos	Points
2021	Xcel Motorsport	DUB1; 1; 6	DUB1; 2; 11	DUB1; 3; 9	DUB1; 4; 9	YMC1; 1; 7	YMC1; 2; 9	YMC1; 3; 4	YMC1; 4; 12	DUB2; 1	DUB2; 2	DUB2; 3	DUB2; 4	YMC2; 1	YMC2; 2	YMC2; 3	YMC2; 4	DUB3; 1	DUB3; 2	DUB3; 3	DUB3; 4	14th	32

=== Complete Formula Regional European Championship results ===
(key) (Races in bold indicate pole position) (Races in italics indicate fastest lap)

Year	Team	1	2	3	4	5	6	7	8	9	10	11	12	13	14	15	16	17	18	19	20	DC	Points
2022	G4 Racing	MNZ; 1; 20	MNZ; 2; 28	IMO; 1; 26	IMO; 2; 28	MCO; 1 DNQ	MCO; 2; 21	LEC; 1; 19	LEC; 2; 22	ZAN; 1; 20	ZAN; 2; 20	HUN; 1; 25	HUN; 2; 21	SPA; 1; 24	SPA; 2; 25	RBR; 1; 31	RBR; 2; 26	CAT; 1; 24	CAT; 2; 18	MUG; 1; 30	MUG; 2; 29	32nd	0
2023	R-ace GP	IMO; 1; 13	IMO; 2; 5	CAT; 1; 14	CAT; 2; 23	HUN; 1; 27	HUN; 2 Ret	SPA; 1; 20	SPA; 2; 23	MUG; 1; 20	MUG; 2; 24†	LEC; 1; 24	LEC; 2; 19	RBR; 1; 22	RBR; 2; 21	MNZ; 1; 21	MNZ; 2; 27	ZAN; 1; 15	ZAN; 2; 10	HOC; 1 Ret	HOC; 2; 23	22nd	12

=== Complete Formula Regional Middle East Championship results ===
(key) (Races in bold indicate pole position) (Races in italics indicate fastest lap)

Year	Entrant	1	2	3	4	5	6	7	8	9	10	11	12	13	14	15	DC	Points
2023	R-ace GP	DUB1; 1; 2	DUB1; 2; 12	DUB1; 3 Ret	KUW1; 1; 9	KUW1; 2; 13	KUW1; 3; 7	KUW2; 1; 23	KUW2; 2 Ret	KUW2; 3; 9	DUB2; 1	DUB2; 2	DUB2; 3	ABU; 1	ABU; 2	ABU; 3	17th	28

=== Complete Macau Grand Prix results ===
Year	Team	Car	Qualifying	Quali Race	Main race
2023	(Switzerland) Jenzer Motorsport	Dallara F3 2019	25th	24th	17th

=== Complete FIA Formula 3 Championship results ===
(key) (Races in bold indicate pole position) (Races in italics indicate fastest lap)

Year	Entrant	1	2	3	4	5	6	7	8	9	10	11	12	13	14	15	16	17	18	19	20	DC	Points
2024	Jenzer Motorsport	BHR; SPR; Ret	BHR; FEA; 18	MEL; SPR; 15	MEL; FEA; 17	IMO; SPR; 17	IMO; FEA; 17	MON; SPR	MON; FEA	CAT; SPR; 19	CAT; FEA; 19	RBR; SPR; 17	RBR; FEA; 14	SIL; SPR; 3	SIL; FEA; 22	HUN; SPR; Ret	HUN; FEA; 27†	SPA; SPR; 17	SPA; FEA; 17	MNZ; SPR; 14	MNZ; FEA; Ret	25th	8
2025	DAMS Lucas Oil	MEL; SPR; 5	MEL; FEA; 22	BHR; SPR; 17	BHR; FEA; 29	IMO; SPR; Ret	IMO; FEA; 22	MON; SPR; 17	MON; FEA; 15	CAT; SPR; 18	CAT; FEA; 15	RBR; SPR; 17	RBR; FEA; 18	SIL; SPR; 25	SIL; FEA; 24	SPA; SPR; Ret	SPA; FEA; C	HUN; SPR; 26	HUN; FEA; 16	MNZ; SPR; 4	MNZ; FEA; Ret	24th	13

=== Complete Formula Regional Oceania Championship results ===
(key) (Races in bold indicate pole position) (Races in italics indicate fastest lap)

Year	Team	1	2	3	4	5	6	7	8	9	10	11	12	13	14	15	DC	Points
2025	M2 Competition	TAU; 1; 5	TAU; 2; 1	TAU; 3; 2	HMP; 1; 16	HMP; 2; 11	HMP; 3; 5	MAN; 1; 12	MAN; 2; 13	MAN; 3; 5	TER; 1; 1	TER; 2; 7	**TER**; **3**; 3	HIG; 1; 4	HIG; 2; 6	HIG; 3 Ret	5th	244

=== Complete GT World Challenge Europe results ===
==== GT World Challenge Europe Endurance Cup ====
(key) (Races in bold indicate pole position) (Races in italics indicate fastest lap)

Year	Team	Car	Class	1	2	3	4	5	6	7	Pos.	Points
2026	AF Corse	Ferrari 296 GT3 Evo	Silver	LEC; 31	MNZ; Ret	SPA; 6H; 26	SPA; 12H; 13	SPA; 24H; 16	NÜR; 32	ALG; 28	6th	47

==== GT World Challenge Europe Sprint Cup ====
(key) (Races in bold indicate pole position) (Races in italics indicate fastest lap)

Year	Team	Car	Class	1	2	3	4	5	6	7	8	9	10	Pos.	Points
2026	AF Corse	Ferrari 296 GT3 Evo	Gold	BRH; 1; 7	BRH; 2; 19	MIS; 1; 15	MIS; 2; 14	MAG; 1; 10	MAG; 2; 10	ZAN; 1; 7	ZAN; 2; 6	CAT; 1; 30	CAT; 2; 17	1st	106
