= Eduardo Coseteng =

Filipino racing driver (born 2003)

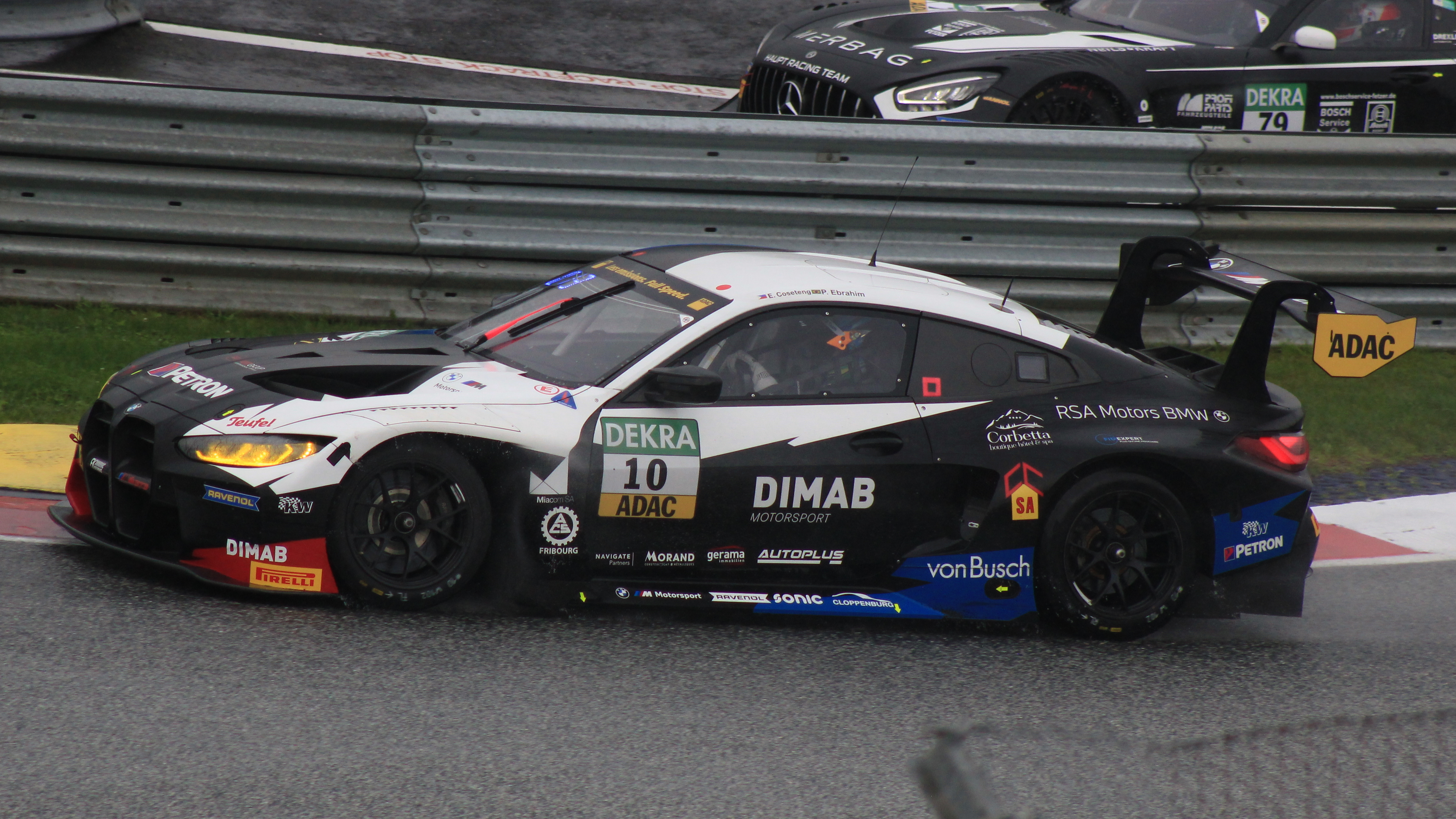
- Nationality: (Philippines) Filipino
- Born: Eduardo Castro Coseteng Jr. September 27, 2003 (age 23) Philippines

GB3 Championship career
- Debut season: 2021
- Current team: Fortec Motorsports
- Categorisation: FIA Silver
- Car number: 16
- Starts: 0
- Wins: 0
- Podiums: 0
- Poles: 0
- Fastest laps: 0
- Best finish: 27th in 2021

Previous series
- 2021: F4 British Championship

Eduardo Castro Coseteng Jr. (born 27 September 2003) is a Filipino racing driver competing in the GT World Challenge Europe Endurance Cup for HRT Ford Racing. He previously raced in ADAC GT Masters for BMW and was a race winner in British F4.

== Career ==
=== Karting ===
Coseteng won the 2019 Macau Karting Grand Prix.

=== F4 British Championship ===
Coseteng made his single-seater racing debut by competing in the 2021 F4 British Championship with Phinsys by Argenti. In his rookie season, he claimed two podiums and finished 12th in the overall standings.

In 2022, Coseteng joined Hitech Grand Prix in the F4 British Championship. He finished seventh in the standings after taking his maiden win in the final round of the season at Brands Hatch.

=== GB3 Championship ===
In October 2021, Coseteng joined Fortec Motorsports to compete in the final round of the GB3 Championship.

=== ADAC GT Masters ===
In 2023, Coseteng made a switch to sports car racing. He raced in the ADAC GT Masters in a BMW M4 GT3 for Schubert Motorsport with Ben Green being his teammate. Throughout the season the pair took three second places and finished seventh in the standings.

For the 2024 ADAC GT Masters season, Coseteng joined FK Performance Motorsport.

== Personal life ==
Coseteng's father Jody Coseteng was a touring car racing driver, who raced in the Macau Grand Prix.

== Racing record ==
=== Racing career summary ===
Season	Series	Team	Races	Wins	Poles	F/Laps	Podiums	Points	Position
2021	F4 British Championship	Phinsys by Argenti	30	0	1	3	1	11	12th
2021	GB3 Championship	Fortec Motorsports	3	0	0	0	0	13	27th
2021	Giti Formula V1 Race Challenge	Eagle Cement Racing Team	?	?	?	?	?	102	**3rd**
2022	F4 British Championship	Hitech Grand Prix	30	1	0	3	4	198	7th
2022	Gulf 12 Hours - GT3 Pro-Am	Century Motorsport	1	0	0	0	0	N/A	7th
2023	ADAC GT Masters	Schubert Motorsport	12	0	0	1	3	136	7th
2024	ADAC GT Masters	FK Performance Motorsport	12	0	0	0	0	53	14th
2025	ADAC GT Masters	FK Performance Motorsport	12	0	0	0	1	117	9th
2026	GT World Challenge Europe Endurance Cup	HRT Ford Racing	5	0	0	0	0	0	NC

* Season still in progress.

=== Complete F4 British Championship results ===
(key) (Races in bold indicate pole position) (Races in italics indicate fastest lap)

Year	Team	1	2	3	4	5	6	7	8	9	10	11	12	13	14	15	16	17	18	19	20	21	22	23	24	25	26	27	28	29	30	DC	Points
2021	Phinsys by Argenti	THR1; 1; 4	THR1; 2; 15	THR1; 3; 11	SNE; 1; 13	SNE; 2 Ret	SNE; 3; 14	BHI; 1 Ret	BHI; 2; 11	BHI; 3; 10	OUL; 1; 9	OUL; 2; 10^{6}	OUL; 3; 7	KNO; 1; 4	KNO; 2; 13	KNO; 3; 7	THR2; 1 Ret	THR2; 2; 4^{10}	THR2; 3 Ret	CRO; 1; 9	CRO; 2; 13	CRO; 3 Ret	SIL; 1; 7	SIL; 2 Ret	SIL; 3; 11	DON; 1; 3	DON; 2 Ret	DON; 3; 9	**BHGP**; **1**; 3	BHGP; 2; 12^{5}	BHGP; 3; 12	12th	111
2022	Hitech Grand Prix	DON; 1; 8	DON; 2; 5^{1}	DON; 3; 4	BHI; 1 NC	BHI; 2; 3^{1}	BHI; 3; 13	THR1; 1; 6	THR1; 2 Ret	THR1; 3; 12	OUL; 1; 10	OUL; 2; 5^{10}	OUL; 3; 7	CRO; 1; 6	CRO; 2; 7	CRO; 3; 6	KNO; 1; 5	KNO; 2; 2^{2}	KNO; 3; 6	SNE; 1; 4	SNE; 2; 8	SNE; 3; 4	THR2; 1 Ret	THR2; 2; 2^{1}	THR2; 3 Ret	SIL; 1; 7	SIL; 2; 6	SIL; 3; 5	BHGP; 1; 15	BHGP; 2; 1^{1}	BHGP; 3; 7	7th	198

=== Complete GB3 Championship results ===
(key) (Races in bold indicate pole position) (Races in italics indicate fastest lap)

Year	Entrant	1	2	3	4	5	6	7	8	9	10	11	12	13	14	15	16	17	18	19	20	21	22	23	24	DC	Points
2021	Fortec Motorsports	BRH; 1	BRH; 2	BRH; 3	SIL; 1	SIL; 2	SIL; 3	DON1; 1	DON1; 2	DON1; 3	SPA; 1	SPA; 2	SPA; 3	SNE; 1	SNE; 2	SNE; 3	SIL2; 1	SIL2; 2	SIL2; 3	OUL; 1	OUL; 2	OUL; 3	DON2; 1; 16	DON2; 2; 17	DON2; 3; 12	27th	13

=== Complete ADAC GT Masters results ===
(key) (Races in bold indicate pole position) (Races in italics indicate fastest lap)

Year	Team	Car	1	2	3	4	5	6	7	8	9	10	11	12	DC	Points
2023	Schubert Motorsport	BMW M4 GT3	HOC1; 1; 2	HOC1; 2; 4	NOR; 1; 9	NOR; 2; 9	NÜR; 1; 8	NÜR; 2; 6^{2}	SAC; 1; 2	SAC; 2; 4	RBR; 1; 2	RBR; 2; 9	HOC2; 1; 7	HOC2; 2 Ret	7th	136
2024	FK Performance Motorsport	BMW M4 GT3	OSC; 1; 13†	OSC; 2; 11	ZAN; 1; 12	ZAN; 2; 9	NÜR; 1; 11	NÜR; 2; 16	SPA; 1 Ret	SPA; 2; 15	RBR; 1; 13	RBR; 2; 15	HOC; 1; 15	HOC; 2; 14	14th	53
2025	FK Performance Motorsport	BMW M4 GT3 Evo	LAU; 1; 9^{3}	LAU; 2; 6	ZAN; 1; 4	ZAN; 2; 2	NÜR; 1; 12	NÜR; 2; 6	SAL; 1; 10	SAL; 2; 5	RBR; 1; 9	RBR; 2; 12^{2}	HOC; 1; 11^{3}	HOC; 2; 6	9th	117

=== Complete GT World Challenge Europe results ===
==== GT World Challenge Europe Endurance Cup ====
(Races in bold indicate pole position) (Races in italics indicate fastest lap)

Year	Team	Car	Class	1	2	3	4	5	6	7	Pos.	Points
2026	HRT Ford Racing	Ford Mustang GT3 Evo	Silver	LEC; 26	**MNZ**; Ret	SPA; 6H; 37	SPA; 12H; 19	SPA; 24H; 18	NÜR; 13	ALG; 20	2nd	66
