= Marcos Flack =

Australian racing driver (born 2006)

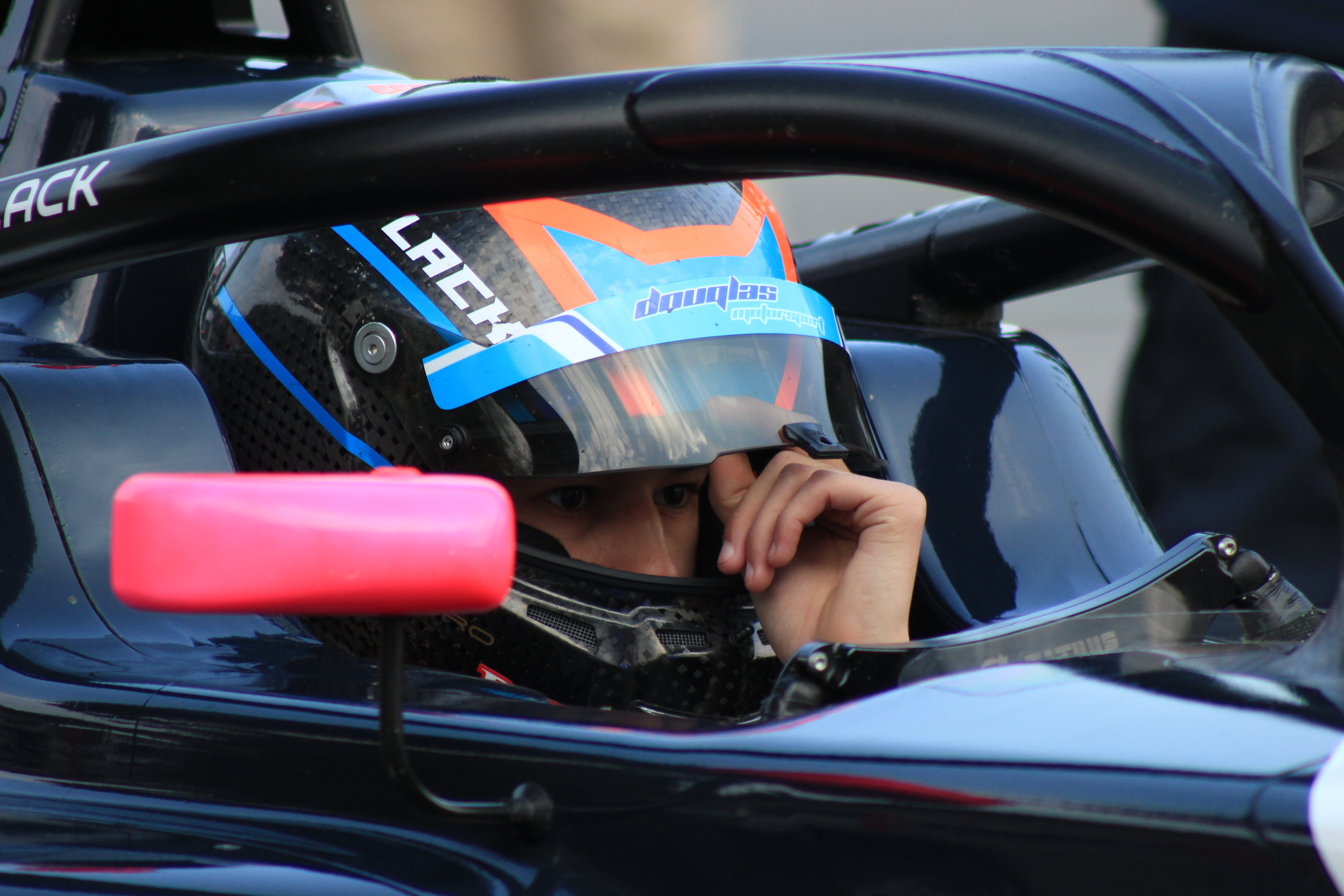
- Flack at Spa-Francorchamps in 2022.
- Nationality: (Australia) Australian
- Born: Marcos Lachlan Flack; 8 March 2006 (age 20) Brisbane, Queensland, Australia

GB3 Championship career
- Debut season: 2022
- Current team: Douglas Motorsport
- Car number: 11
- Starts: 18 (18 entries)
- Wins: 0
- Podiums: 1
- Poles: 0
- Fastest laps: 0
- Best finish: TBC in 2022

Previous series
- 2022, 2021 2021: ADAC Formula 4 F4 British Championship

Marcos Lachlan Flack (born 8 March 2006) is an Australian racing driver currently competing in the GB3 Championship with Douglas Motorsport, and the Italian F4 Championship with R-ace GP.

He is the son of former Porsche Carrera Cup Australia Championship amateur driver Damien Flack and is currently coached by British Touring Car Championship driver Dan Cammish.

== Career ==
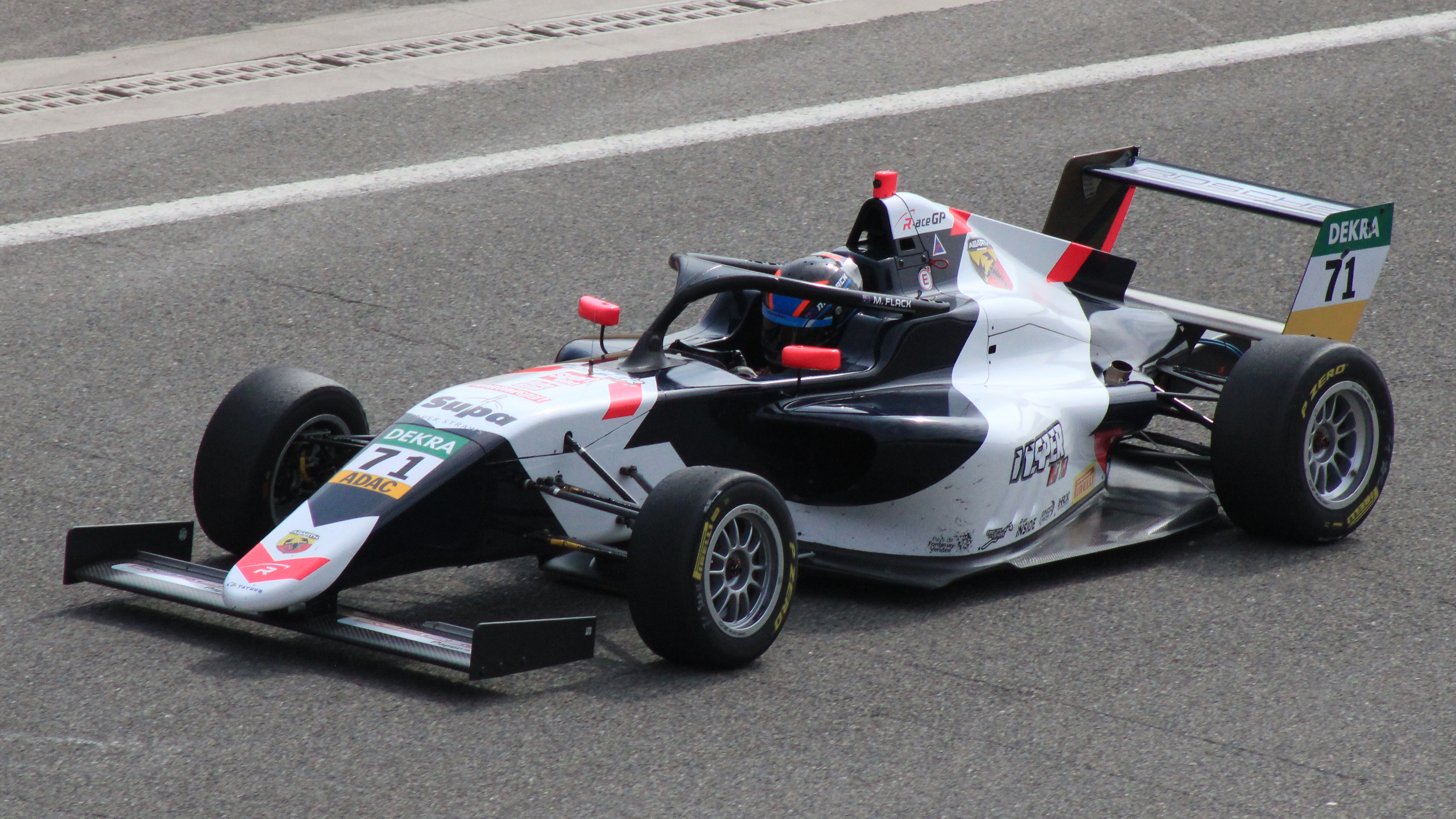
Flack driving at Spa-Francorchamps in 2022.

=== Karting ===
Flack made his karting debut in 2011 in the Bambino Queensland Cup, which he won in that year and in 2012. In 2014, he became a factory driver for CRG, and began karting internationally alongside in Australia. In 2016, he won the Macau International Kart Grand Prix, and began competing in World Series Karting the same year. Switching to the Energy Course team in 2019, Flack won in the IAME International Final in the Junior ROK category, and also competed in the FIA European Karting European Championship in the OK Junior class in this year.

In 2020, Flack was announced as one of two drivers to be representing Asia, Pacific and Oceania at the Ferrari Driver Academy scouting world final, alongside James Wharton. He was a finalist in the event.

=== Formula 4 ===
Prior to his competitive debut in 2021, Flack spent time in New Zealand in 2020 working as an engineer in the Toyota Racing Series to understand the mechanical side of racing better.

Flack made his car racing debut in the 2021 F4 British Championship driving for Phinsys by Argenti, following his participation in official British F4 tests in 2020 and tests with MTEC Motorsport. He also competed in select rounds of ADAC Formula 4 and the Italian F4 Championship. He finished 11th in the British F4 season, with three overall podiums.

Flack moved to R-ace GP for his first full season in Italian F4 in 2022, and also competed in the Spa-Francorchamps round of ADAC Formula 4.

Flack returned to British F4 in the 2022 season from Round 9, driving for Fortec Motorsports.

=== GB3 Championship ===
Flack made his debut in the GB3 Championship in 2022, driving for Douglas Motorsport alongside Max Esterson and Tommy Smith. He achieved his first podium during Race 3 at the Snetterton round, and his first win during Race 3 at the second Silverstone Circuit round.

=== Indy Pro 2000 ===
Flack joined Jay Howard Driver Development for the final two rounds of the 2022 Indy Pro 2000 Championship. With a best finish of fourth, he finished 17th in the standings.

== Karting record ==
=== Karting career summary ===
Season	Series	Team	Position
2011	Bambino Queensland Cup		1st
2012	Bambino Queensland Cup		1st
2013	Ipswich Cadet Championship		1st
2015	Andrea Margutti Trophy - 60 Mini		22nd
2016	Andrea Margutti Trophy - 60 Mini		22nd
2017	SKUSA SuperNationals XXI - Mini Swift Class	CRG Nordam	35th
2017	Australian Kart Championship - Cadet 12		3rd
2017	WSK Champions Cup - 60 Mini		11th
2017	WSK Final Cup - 60 Mini	Gamoto ASD	6th
2017	WSK Super Master Series - 60 Mini		33rd
2018	WSK Master Series - 60 Mini		13th
2018	WSK Champions Cup - 60 Mini		8th
2019	WSK Final Cup - OK Junior	Energy Course	28th
2019	WSK Open Cup - OK Junior	Energy Course	76th
2019	IAME International Final - X30 Junior	Energy Course	N/A
2019	German Junior Kart Championship	Energy Course	N/A
2019	48° Trofeo delle Industrie- OK Junior	Energy Course	14th
2019	ROK Cup Superfinal - Junior ROK	Energy Course	21st
2019	CIK-FIA Karting European Championship - OK Junior	Energy Course	N/A
2019	WSK Euro Series - OK Junior	Energy Course	N/A
2019	WSK Super Master Series - OK Junior	Energy Course	N/A
2020	Australian Kart Championship - KA2		N/A

== Racing record ==
=== Racing career summary ===
Season	Series	Team	Races	Wins	Poles	F/Laps	Podiums	Points	Position
2021	F4 British Championship	Phinsys by Argenti	30	0	0	2	3	117	11th
2021	Italian F4 Championship	Cram Motorsport	3	0	0	0	0	0	42nd
2021	ADAC Formula 4 Championship	Van Amersfoort Racing	3	0	0	0	0	1	20th
2022	GB3 Championship	Douglas Motorsport	18	1	0	0	2	136.5	20th
2022	Italian F4 Championship	R-ace GP	6	0	0	0	0	0	39th
2022	ADAC Formula 4 Championship	R-ace GP	3	0	0	0	0	0	NC†
2022	F4 Spanish Championship	GRS Team	9	0	0	0	0	8	20th
2022	Indy Pro 2000 Championship	Jay Howard Driver Development	4	0	0	0	0	51	17th
2022	F4 British Championship	Fortec Motorsports	6	0	0	0	0	4	20th
2023	Porsche Michelin Sprint Challenge Australia	Sonic Motor Racing Services	12	0	1	0	2	291*	11th*
2023	GT World Challenge Australia - GT Trophy	Sonic Motor Racing Services	2	2	1	2	2	50	**3rd***
2023	Porsche Carrera Cup Australia - Pro	Sonic Motor Racing Services	3	0	0	0	0	50	26th
2024	GT4 Australia Series	Method Motorsport							
2025	Porsche Carrera Cup Australia - Pro	Sonic Motor Racing Services	23	0	1	0	3	641	7th
2025	Porsche Carrera Cup Germany	ID Racing	2	0	0	0	0	0	NC†
2026	Porsche Carrera Cup Australia	Sonic Motor Racing Services							

^{†} As Flack was a guest driver, he was ineligible for championship points.
* Season still in progress.

=== Complete F4 British Championship results ===
(key) (Races in bold indicate pole position) (Races in italics indicate fastest lap)

Year	Team	1	2	3	4	5	6	7	8	9	10	11	12	13	14	15	16	17	18	19	20	21	22	23	24	25	26	27	28	29	30	DC	Points
2021	Phinsys by Argenti	THR1; 1 Ret	THR1; 2; 12	THR1; 3; 10	SNE; 1; 5	SNE; 2; 7	SNE; 3; 2	BHI; 1 Ret	BHI; 2; 13	BHI; 3; 16	OUL; 1; 8	OUL; 2; 7^{2}	OUL; 3; 17	KNO; 1 Ret	KNO; 2; 11	KNO; 3; 12	THR2; 1; 13	THR2; 2 Ret	THR2; 3; 11	CRO; 1; 11	CRO; 2; 3^{3}	CRO; 3 Ret	SIL; 1; 6	SIL; 2; 9^{4}	SIL; 3; 2	DON; 1; 9	DON; 2; 5	DON; 3; 7	BHGP; 1; 6	BHGP; 2; 11^{4}	BHGP; 3; 5	11th	117
2022	Fortec Motorsports	DON; 1	DON; 2	DON; 3	BHI; 1	BHI; 2	BHI; 3	THR1; 1	THR1; 2	THR1; 3	OUL; 1	OUL; 2	OUL; 3	CRO; 1	CRO; 2	CRO; 3	KNO; 1	KNO; 2	KNO; 3	SNE; 1	SNE; 2	SNE; 3	THR2; 1	THR2; 2	THR2; 3	SIL; 1; 17	SIL; 2; 12^{2}	SIL; 3; 9	BHGP; 1; 14	BHGP; 2 Ret	BHGP; 3 Ret	20th	4

=== Complete Italian F4 Championship results ===
(key) (Races in bold indicate pole position) (Races in italics indicate fastest lap)

Year	Team	1	2	3	4	5	6	7	8	9	10	11	12	13	14	15	16	17	18	19	20	21	22	DC	Points
2021	Cram Motorsport	LEC; 1	LEC; 2	LEC; 3	MIS; 1	MIS; 2	MIS; 3	VLL; 1	VLL; 2	VLL; 3	IMO; 1	IMO; 2	IMO; 3	RBR; 1	RBR; 2	RBR; 3	RBR; 4	MUG; 1	MUG; 2	MUG; 3	MNZ; 1; 28†	MNZ; 2; 24	MNZ; 3; 19	42nd	0
2022	R-ace GP	IMO; 1; 19	IMO; 2; 21	IMO; 3; 29†	MIS; 1; 23	MIS; 2; 14	MIS; 3; 24	SPA; 1 WD	SPA; 2 WD	SPA; 3 WD	VLL; 1	VLL; 2	VLL; 3	RBR; 1	RBR; 2	RBR; 3	RBR; 4	MNZ; 1	MNZ; 2	MNZ; 3	MUG; 1	MUG; 2	MUG; 3	39th	0

=== Complete ADAC Formula 4 Championship results ===
(key) (Races in bold indicate pole position) (Races in italics indicate fastest lap)

Year	Team	1	2	3	4	5	6	7	8	9	10	11	12	13	14	15	16	17	18	DC	Points
2021	R-ace GP	RBR; 1	RBR; 2	RBR; 3	ZAN; 1	ZAN; 2	ZAN; 3	HOC1; 1	HOC1; 2	HOC1; 3	SAC; 1	SAC; 2	SAC; 3	HOC2; 1	HOC2; 2	HOC2; 3	NÜR; 1; 12	NÜR; 2; 13	NÜR; 3; 10	20th	1

=== Complete F4 Spanish Championship results ===
(key) (Races in bold indicate pole position) (Races in italics indicate fastest lap)

Year	Team	1	2	3	4	5	6	7	8	9	10	11	12	13	14	15	16	17	18	19	20	21	DC	Points
2022	GRS Team	ALG; 1	ALG; 2	ALG; 3	JER; 1	JER; 2	JER; 3	CRT; 1	CRT; 2	CRT; 3	SPA; 1 Ret	SPA; 2; 20	SPA; 3; 6	ARA; 1	ARA; 2	ARA; 3	NAV; 1; 20	NAV; 2; 24	NAV; 3 Ret	CAT; 1; 22	CAT; 2; 23	CAT; 3; 16	20th	8

=== Complete GB3 Championship results ===
(key) (Races in bold indicate pole position) (Races in italics indicate fastest lap)

Year	Team	1	2	3	4	5	6	7	8	9	10	11	12	13	14	15	16	17	18	19	20	21	22	23	24	DC	Points
2022	Douglas Motorsport	OUL; 1; 9	OUL; 2; 14	OUL; 3; 19	SIL1; 1	SIL1; 2	SIL1; 3	DON1; 1; 11	DON1; 2; 14	DON1; 3; 17	SNE; 1; 15	SNE; 2; 15	SNE; 3; 2^{2}	SPA; 1; 10	SPA; 2; 6	SPA; 3; 9	SIL2; 1; 22	SIL2; 2; 13	SIL2; 3; 1^{5}	BRH; 1; 17	BRH; 2; 20	BRH; 3; 16	DON2; 1	DON2; 2	DON2; 3	20th	136.5

=== American open-wheel racing results ===
==== Indy Pro 2000 Championship ====
(key) (Races in bold indicate pole position) (Races in italics indicate fastest lap) (Races with * indicate most race laps led)

Year	Team	1	2	3	4	5	6	7	8	9	10	11	12	13	14	15	16	17	18	Ran	Points
2022	Jay Howard Driver Development	STP; 1	STP; 2	ALA; 1	ALA; 2	IMS; 1	IMS; 2	IMS; 3	IRP	ROA; 1	ROA; 2	MOH; 1	MOH; 2	TOR; 1	TOR; 2	GMP; 8	POR; 1; 4	POR; 2; 15	POR; 3; 15	17th	51

* Season still in progress.
