= 2021 F4 British Championship =

The 2021 F4 British Championship was a multi-event, Formula 4 open-wheel single seater motor racing championship held across United Kingdom. The championship featured a mix of professional motor racing teams and privately funded drivers, competing in Formula 4 cars that conformed to the technical regulations for the championship. This, the seventh season, following on from the British Formula Ford Championship, was the seventh year that the cars conformed to the FIA's Formula 4 regulations. Part of the TOCA tour, it formed part of the extensive program of support categories built up around the BTCC centrepiece.

The season commenced on 8 May at Thruxton Circuit and concluded on 24 October at Brands Hatch, utilising the Grand Prix circuit, after thirty races held at ten meetings, all in the support of the 2021 British Touring Car Championship.

From this season forward, the grid for race 2 is a full reverse grid based on the results of qualifying, instead of reversing the top half drivers from race 1.

This was the last season of the championship using the combination of Mygale M14-F4 chassis and the engines supplied by Ford.

== Teams and drivers ==
All teams were British-registered.

Team	No.	Drivers	Class	Rounds
Fortec Motorsport	5	(Sweden) Joel Granfors		All
Fortec Motorsport	63	(United Kingdom) Oliver Gray	R	1–8, 10
Fortec Motorsport	67	(United Kingdom) James Hedley		1–5
Phinsys by Argenti	8	(Peru) Matías Zagazeta		All
Phinsys by Argenti	11	(Australia) Marcos Flack	R	All
Phinsys by Argenti	36	(Philippines) Eduardo Coseteng	R	All
Phinsys by Argenti	57	(United Kingdom) Aiden Neate	R	3–10
TRS Arden Junior Team	10	(United Kingdom) Thomas Ikin	R	1–4
TRS Arden Junior Team	23	(United Kingdom) Georgi Dimitrov (Note: Georgi Dimitrov is a British-Bulgarian driver racing under the British-Bulgarian flag.)		7–10
TRS Arden Junior Team	50	(Australia) Cameron McLeod		8–10
TRS Arden Junior Team	77	(United States) David Morales		2–10
TRS Arden Junior Team	99	(United Kingdom) Zak Taylor		All
Carlin	15	(United Kingdom) Kai Askey	R	All
Carlin	21	(Thailand) Tasanapol Inthraphuvasak		All
Carlin	25	(Japan) Dougie Bolger	R	1–9
Carlin	31	(Poland) Roman Biliński		1–4
Carlin	67	(United Kingdom) James Hedley		6–10
JHR Developments	16	(United Kingdom) McKenzy Cresswell	R	All
JHR Developments	25	(Japan) Dougie Bolger	R	10
JHR Developments	35	(United Kingdom) Matthew Rees	R	All
JHR Developments	49	(United Kingdom) Abbi Pulling		1–6
JHR Developments	84	(United Kingdom) Joseph Loake		All
Richardson Racing	23	(United Kingdom) Georgi Dimitrov		2–4

Icon	Class
R	Rookie

== Race calendar ==
All races were held in the United Kingdom. All rounds supported 2021 British Touring Car Championship. The provisional calendar was announced on 20 July 2020. An amended version was unveiled on 14 January 2021 with the season opener moving to 8 May at Thruxton Circuit. Further changes were published on 15 March 2021.

Round		Circuit	Date	Pole position	Fastest lap	Winning driver	Winning team	Rookie winner
1	R1	Thruxton Circuit (Hampshire)	8 May	(United Kingdom) Matthew Rees	(Peru) Matías Zagazeta	(United Kingdom) James Hedley	Fortec Motorsport	(Philippines) Eduardo Coseteng
1	R2	Thruxton Circuit (Hampshire)	9 May		(Philippines) Eduardo Coseteng	(United Kingdom) James Hedley	Fortec Motorsport	(United Kingdom) Thomas Ikin
1	R3	Thruxton Circuit (Hampshire)	9 May	(United Kingdom) Matthew Rees	(Philippines) Eduardo Coseteng	(United Kingdom) Joseph Loake	JHR Developments	(United Kingdom) McKenzy Cresswell
2	R4	Snetterton Motor Racing Circuit (300 Circuit, Norfolk)	12 June	(United Kingdom) Matthew Rees	(Australia) Marcos Flack	(United Kingdom) Matthew Rees	JHR Developments	(United Kingdom) Matthew Rees
2	R5	Snetterton Motor Racing Circuit (300 Circuit, Norfolk)	12 June		(Sweden) Joel Granfors	(United Kingdom) Georgi Dimitrov	Richardson Racing	(United Kingdom) Thomas Ikin
2	R6	Snetterton Motor Racing Circuit (300 Circuit, Norfolk)	13 June	(United Kingdom) Matthew Rees	(United Kingdom) McKenzy Cresswell	(United Kingdom) Matthew Rees	JHR Developments	(United Kingdom) Matthew Rees
3	R7	Brands Hatch (Indy Circuit, Kent)	26 June		(United Kingdom) Joseph Loake	(United Kingdom) Zak Taylor	TRS Arden Junior Team	(United Kingdom) Thomas Ikin
3	R8	Brands Hatch (Indy Circuit, Kent)	27 June	(United Kingdom) Matthew Rees (Note: The starting grids between the first two races of the round were swapped.)	(United Kingdom) McKenzy Cresswell	(United Kingdom) James Hedley	Fortec Motorsport	(United Kingdom) Matthew Rees
3	R9	Brands Hatch (Indy Circuit, Kent)	27 June	(United Kingdom) McKenzy Cresswell	(United Kingdom) Joseph Loake	(Peru) Matías Zagazeta	Phinsys by Argenti	(United Kingdom) McKenzy Cresswell
4	R10	Oulton Park (Island Circuit, Cheshire)	31 July	(United Kingdom) James Hedley	(United Kingdom) James Hedley	(United Kingdom) James Hedley	Fortec Motorsport	(United Kingdom) Matthew Rees
4	R11	Oulton Park (Island Circuit, Cheshire)	31 July		(United Kingdom) Oliver Gray	(United Kingdom) McKenzy Cresswell	JHR Developments	(United Kingdom) McKenzy Cresswell
4	R12	Oulton Park (Island Circuit, Cheshire)	1 August	(United Kingdom) James Hedley	(United Kingdom) Aiden Neate	(United Kingdom) Joseph Loake	JHR Developments	(Japan) Dougie Bolger
5	R13	Knockhill Racing Circuit (Fife)	14 August	(Peru) Matías Zagazeta	(Peru) Matías Zagazeta	(Peru) Matías Zagazeta	Phinsys by Argenti	(United Kingdom) Matthew Rees
5	R14	Knockhill Racing Circuit (Fife)	15 August		(United Kingdom) Kai Askey	(United Kingdom) McKenzy Cresswell	JHR Developments	(United Kingdom) McKenzy Cresswell
5	R15	Knockhill Racing Circuit (Fife)	15 August	(Peru) Matías Zagazeta	(Sweden) Joel Granfors	(Peru) Matías Zagazeta	Phinsys by Argenti	(United Kingdom) Matthew Rees
6	R16	Thruxton Circuit (Hampshire)	28 August	(United Kingdom) Oliver Gray	(United Kingdom) Aiden Neate	(United Kingdom) Oliver Gray (Note: Matías Zagazeta finished as the first but was given 1 second time penalty. Gray inherited the win.)	Fortec Motorsport	(United Kingdom) Oliver Gray
6	R17	Thruxton Circuit (Hampshire)	28 August		(Sweden) Joel Granfors	(Sweden) Joel Granfors	Fortec Motorsport	(Philippines) Eduardo Coseteng
6	R18	Thruxton Circuit (Hampshire)	29 August	(United Kingdom) Oliver Gray	(Sweden) Joel Granfors	(United Kingdom) Oliver Gray	Fortec Motorsport	(United Kingdom) Oliver Gray
7	R19	Croft Circuit (North Yorkshire)	18 September	(United Kingdom) McKenzy Cresswell	(United Kingdom) McKenzy Cresswell	(United Kingdom) McKenzy Cresswell	JHR Developments	(United Kingdom) McKenzy Cresswell
7	R20	Croft Circuit (North Yorkshire)	18 September		(Philippines) Eduardo Coseteng	(Japan) Dougie Bolger	Carlin	(Japan) Dougie Bolger
7	R21	Croft Circuit (North Yorkshire)	19 September	(United Kingdom) McKenzy Cresswell	(United Kingdom) McKenzy Cresswell	(United Kingdom) McKenzy Cresswell	JHR Developments	(United Kingdom) McKenzy Cresswell
8	R22	Silverstone Circuit (National Circuit, Northamptonshire)	25 September	(Peru) Matías Zagazeta	(United Kingdom) Matthew Rees	(Peru) Matías Zagazeta	Phinsys by Argenti	(United Kingdom) Matthew Rees
8	R23	Silverstone Circuit (National Circuit, Northamptonshire)	26 September		(United Kingdom) Joseph Loake	(United Kingdom) Georgi Dimitrov	TRS Arden Junior Team	(United Kingdom) Kai Askey
8	R24	Silverstone Circuit (National Circuit, Northamptonshire)	26 September	(Peru) Matías Zagazeta	(United Kingdom) McKenzy Cresswell	(United Kingdom) Joseph Loake	JHR Developments	(Australia) Marcos Flack
9	R25	Donington Park (National Circuit, Leicestershire)	9 October	(United Kingdom) Matthew Rees	(United Kingdom) McKenzy Cresswell	(United Kingdom) Matthew Rees	JHR Developments	(United Kingdom) Matthew Rees
9	R26	Donington Park (National Circuit, Leicestershire)	10 October		(Australia) Marcos Flack	(United Kingdom) Georgi Dimitrov	TRS Arden Junior Team	(United Kingdom) Kai Askey
9	R27	Donington Park (National Circuit, Leicestershire)	10 October	(United Kingdom) Matthew Rees	(United Kingdom) Matthew Rees	(United Kingdom) Matthew Rees	JHR Developments	(United Kingdom) Matthew Rees
10	R28	Brands Hatch (Grand Prix Circuit, Kent)	23 October	(Philippines) Eduardo Coseteng	(United Kingdom) Matthew Rees	(United Kingdom) McKenzy Cresswell	JHR Developments	(United Kingdom) McKenzy Cresswell
10	R29	Brands Hatch (Grand Prix Circuit, Kent)	23 October		(Australia) Cameron McLeod	(Thailand) Tasanapol Inthraphuvasak	Carlin	(United Kingdom) Oliver Gray
10	R30	Brands Hatch (Grand Prix Circuit, Kent)	24 October	(United Kingdom) McKenzy Cresswell	(Peru) Matías Zagazeta	(United Kingdom) McKenzy Cresswell	JHR Developments	(United Kingdom) McKenzy Cresswell

== Championship standings ==
Points were awarded to the top ten classified finishers in races 1 and 3 and for the top eight classified finishers in race 2. During the round at Brands Hatch utilising the Indy circuit, the race awarding 15 points for the winner was run as the first one. From this round onwards, an extra point was awarded for every position a competitor gained during a reverse grid race.

Races	Position, points per race										
Races	**1st**	**2nd**	**3rd**	**4th**	**5th**	**6th**	**7th**	**8th**	**9th**	**10th**	**FL**
Races 1 & 3	25	18	15	12	10	8	6	4	2	1	1
Race 2	15	12	10	8	6	4	2	1			1

=== Drivers' standings ===
Pos	Driver	THR1			SNE			BHI			OUL			KNO			THR2			CRO			SIL			DON			BHGP			Pen.	Pts
1	(United Kingdom) Matthew Rees	**13**	13	**5**	**1**	12	**1**	9^{10}	**2**	4	2	9^{9}	5	3	14	3	9	7^{6}	5	3	12^{3}	5	2	NC	Ret	**1**	7^{9}	**1**	5	5^{6}	4		331
2	(Peru) Matías Zagazeta	3	9	Ret	9	13	6	12^{5}	4	1	Ret	Ret	2	**1**	9^{7}	**1**	2	12^{3}	2	4	7^{5}	2	**1**	11^{6}	**Ret**	6	6^{3}	2	Ret	9^{3}	2		306
3	(United Kingdom) McKenzy Cresswell	9	7	2	3	14	3	10^{8}	6	**2**	13	1^{4}	14	8	1^{3}	9	4	Ret	WD	**1**	Ret	**1**	5	8^{6}	9	2	12^{3}	4	1	10^{6}	**1**		305
4	(Sweden) Joel Granfors	2	2	8	8	5	Ret	8^{3}	8	6	11	5^{3}	10	2	Ret	2	7	1^{9}	3	2	8^{6}	4	4	Ret	Ret	8	8^{4}	3	4	Ret	WD		240
5	(United Kingdom) James Hedley	1	1	3	2	11	4	15	1	5	**1**	12^{7}	**6**	10	DNS	11	Ret	3^{3}	8	12	5	12	15	6	Ret	7	4^{3}	8	12	2^{4}	13		226
6	(United Kingdom) Joseph Loake	15	10	1	7	Ret	9	14^{1}	Ret	7	3	13^{4}	1	5	6^{3}	Ret	Ret	9	6	5	10^{1}	7	Ret	4^{7}	1	4	Ret	13	2	Ret	Ret		199
7	(United Kingdom) Oliver Gray	6	11	4	4	10	11	5^{7}	9	11	5	6^{6}	Ret	9	7	Ret	**1**	5^{11}	**1**	8	6^{3}	9	Ret	7^{3}	Ret				10	4^{1}	7		173
8	(United Kingdom) Kai Askey	10	Ret	9	14	4	13	11^{3}	7	3	10	17	8	7	3^{3}	8	8	13	12	13	4^{1}	10	10	3^{5}	3	12	2^{3}	10	9	6	10		132
9	(United Kingdom) Aiden Neate							6^{4}	16	9	7	15	9	Ret	12	6	5	6^{2}	4	7	Ret	3	3	10^{6}	Ret	5	9^{5}	16	11	Ret	3		128
10	(Thailand) Tasanapol Inthraphuvasak	14	4	DSQ	12	8	7	13	10	14	17	2^{1}	13	6	4^{4}	10	6	Ret	9	10	2^{5}	6	8	5^{2}	6	11	Ret	11	13	1	9		123
11	(Australia) Marcos Flack	Ret	12	10	5	7	2	Ret	13	16	8	7^{2}	17	Ret	11	12	13	Ret	11	11	3^{3}	Ret	6	9^{4}	2	9	5	7	6	11^{4}	5	3	117
12	(Philippines) Eduardo Coseteng	4	15	11	13	Ret	14	Ret	11	10	9	10^{6}	7	4	13	7	Ret	4^{10}	Ret	9	13	Ret	7	Ret	11	3	Ret	9	**3**	12^{5}	12		111
13	(United Kingdom) Zak Taylor	5	3	14	11	3	8	1^{4}	17	13	12	8	11	Ret	2^{3}	14	12	8	Ret	6	11	11	11	12	4	13	3	6	Ret	Ret	Ret		108
14	(United Kingdom) Abbi Pulling	12	5	12	6	9	5	3^{5}	3	8	Ret	4^{2}	16	13	8^{3}	4	3	11	10													3	97
15	(Japan) Dougie Bolger	8	14	6	18	6	Ret	4	12	15	6	11^{2}	4	11	10	5	10	10	7	15	1	13	13	Ret	10	10	11	5	8	13	11	15	79
16	(United Kingdom) Georgi Dimitrov				16	1	10	Ret	Ret	Ret	15	14	Ret							16	9	14	12	1^{1}	5	14	1^{1}	14	7	8^{2}	6		75
17	(Poland) Roman Biliński	7	8	7	10	Ret	12	7^{6}	5	12	4	16	3																			9	50
18	(United States) David Morales				17	Ret	16	Ret	14	18	16	18	15	12	5	13	11	2	13	14	Ret	8	9	Ret	7	15	10	15	14	3	14		40
19	(United Kingdom) Thomas Ikin	11	6	13	15	2	15	2^{1}	15	17	14	3	12																				39
20	(Australia) Cameron McLeod																						14	2	8	16	13	12	15	7	8		23
Pos	Driver	THR1			SNE			BHI			OUL			KNO			THR2			CRO			SIL			DON			BHGP			Pen.	Pts

Colour	Result
Gold	Winner
Silver	Second place
Bronze	Third place
Green	Points classification
Blue	Non-points classification
Blue	Non-classified finish (NC)
Purple	Retired, not classified (Ret)
Red	Did not qualify (DNQ)
Red	Did not pre-qualify (DNPQ)
Black	Disqualified (DSQ)
White	Did not start (DNS)
White	Withdrew (WD)
White	Race cancelled (C)
Blank	Did not practice (DNP)
Blank	Did not arrive (DNA)
Blank	Excluded (EX)

**Bold** – Pole
Italics – Fastest Lap
^{x} – Positions Gained

=== Rookie Cup ===
Pos	Driver	THR1			SNE			BHI			OUL			KNO			THR2			CRO			SIL			DON			BHGP			Pen.	Pts
1	(United Kingdom) Matthew Rees	13	13	5	1	12	1	9	2	4	2	9	5	3	14	3	9	7	5	3	12	5	2	NC	Ret	1	7	1	5	5	4		426
2	(United Kingdom) McKenzy Cresswell	9	7	2	3	14	3	10	6	2	13	1	14	8	1	9	4	Ret	WD	1	Ret	1	5	8	9	2	12	4	1	10	1		397
3	(United Kingdom) Oliver Gray	6	11	4	4	10	11	5	9	11	5	6	Ret	9	7	Ret	1	5	1	8	6	9	Ret	7	Ret				10	4	7		294
4	(United Kingdom) Kai Askey	10	Ret	9	14	4	13	11	7	3	10	17	8	7	3	8	8	13	12	13	4	10	10	3	3	12	2	10	9	6	10		286
5	(Japan) Dougie Bolger	8	14	6	18	6	Ret	4	12	15	6	11	4	11	10	5	10	10	7	15	1	13	13	Ret	10	10	11	5	8	13	11	15	250
6	(Australia) Marcos Flack	Ret	12	10	5	7	2	Ret	13	16	8	7	17	Ret	11	12	13	Ret	11	11	3	Ret	6	9	2	9	5	7	6	11	5	3	240
7	(Philippines) Eduardo Coseteng	4	15	11	13	Ret	14	Ret	11	10	9	10	7	4	13	7	Ret	4	Ret	9	13	Ret	7	Ret	11	3	Ret	9	3	12	12		230
8	(United Kingdom) Aiden Neate							6	16	9	7	15	9	Ret	12	6	5	6	4	7	Ret	3	3	10	Ret	5	9	16	11	Ret	3		212
9	(United Kingdom) Thomas Ikin	11	6	13	15	2	15	2	15	17	14	3	12																				97
Pos	Driver	THR1			SNE			BHI			OUL			KNO			THR2			CRO			SIL			DON			BHGP			Pen.	Pts

=== Teams Cup ===
Each team nominated two drivers to score points before every round. All non-nominated drivers were ignored.

Pos	Team	Pts
1	JHR Developments	648
2	Fortec Motorsport	575
3	Phinsys by Argenti	493
4	Carlin	434
5	TRS Arden Junior Team	369
6	Richardson Racing	26
