= Oliver Gray =

British racing driver (born 2005)

- Gray at Silverstone Circuit in 2026
- Nationality: (United Kingdom) British
- Born: 28 April 2005 (age 21) Woking, Surrey, England

European Le Mans Series career
- Debut season: 2024
- Current team: VDS Panis Racing
- Categorisation: FIA Silver (2024–2025); FIA Gold (2026–)
- Car number: 48
- Former teams: Inter Europol Competition
- Starts: 12 (12 entries)
- Wins: 3
- Podiums: 5
- Poles: 0
- Fastest laps: 1
- Best finish: 1st in 2025

Previous series
- 2024 2023 2022 2021–2022 2021: Porsche Carrera Cup Italy; FIA Formula 3 Championship; F4 British Championship; Formula 4 UAE Championship; Italian F4 Championship

Championship titles
- 2025: European Le Mans Series - LMP2

Oliver "Ollie" Gray (born 28 April 2005) is a British racing driver competing in the European Le Mans Series for Forestier Racing by Panis. He won the 2025 European Le Mans Series in LMP2 with VDS Panis Racing, partnering Esteban Masson and Charles Milesi. Gray was previously a Williams F1 junior, finishing runner-up in British F4 and racing in FIA Formula 3 for Carlin.

== Early career ==
=== Karting ===
Gray began his karting career at Buckmore Park in 2015. After winning the British Championship in 2019, he moved into international competition in 2020, driving for Leclerc by Lennox Racing. He also narrowly missed out on winning the 2019 IAME International Final at Le Mans, losing victory to Oliver Bearman due to a last-lap engine failure.

=== Formula 4 ===
==== 2021 ====
Gray began his single-seater career in 2021, driving for Fortec Motorsport in the F4 British Championship. He had a solid season, taking his maiden wins in Thruxton Circuit. However, those were his only wins of the year, let alone standing on the podium. Despite missing a round, Gray placed seventh in the standings.

Gray also took part in two rounds of the Italian F4 Championship with BVM Racing. He had a best finish of 12th and placed 37th in the championship.

==== 2022 ====
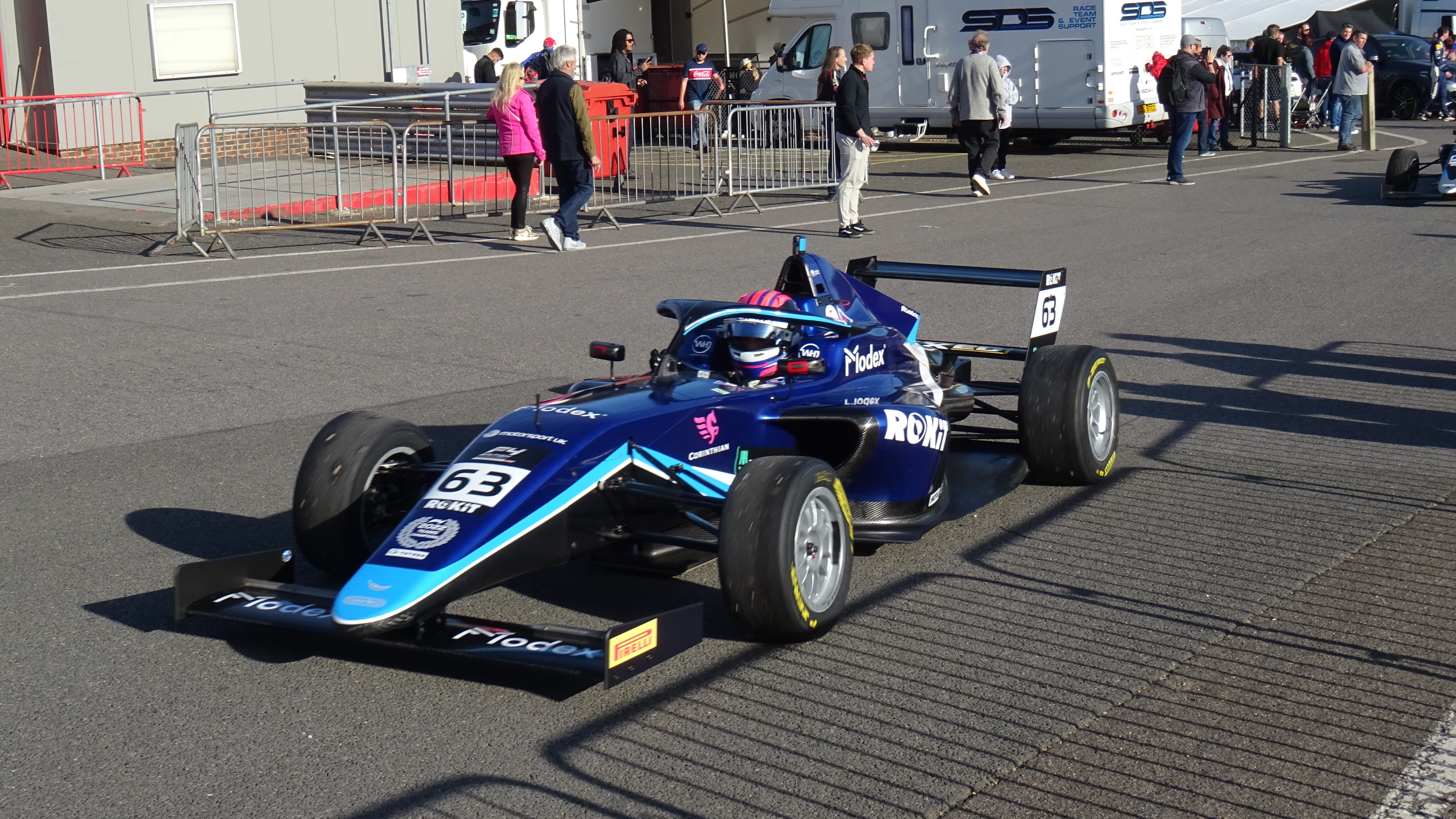
Gray racing at Brands Hatch during the 2022 F4 British Championship

Gray partook in the 2022 Formula 4 UAE Championship with Hitech GP. He raced in only the first two rounds, scoring a podium in the second race, which put him 15th overall.

For his main campaign, Gray switched to Carlin for his second F4 British season. The season was largely dominated by Alex Dunne, but Gray was able to notch up two wins at Croft Circuit and Silverstone. He did however, score 14 further podiums throughout the season, securing vice-champion following the conclusion of the season. He was also nominated for the Autosport BRDC Award.

=== FIA Formula 3 Championship ===
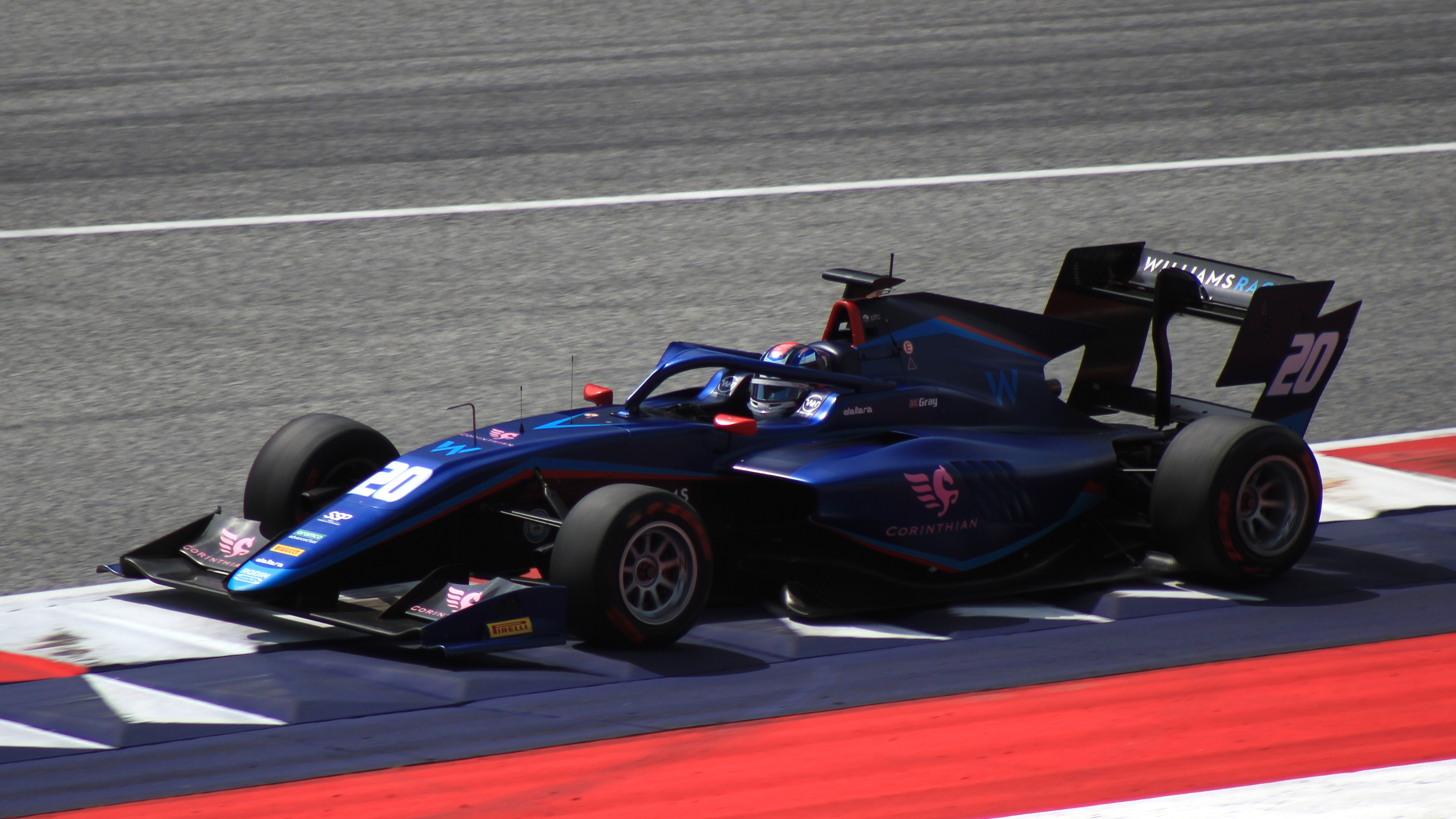
Gray driving the Dallara F3 2019 during the 2023 Spielberg Formula 3 round

Gray was promoted to FIA Formula 3 for 2023, staying with Rodin Carlin. He had a disappointing season, failing to score points and having a best finish of 14th, which placed him 28th overall in the standings.

=== Formula One ===
Gray was part of the Williams Driver Academy from 2022 to 2023.

== Sportscar career ==
=== 2024: ELMS debut ===
Following a sub-par Formula 3 campaign, Gray switched to racing in the 2024 European Le Mans Series with Inter Europol Competition alongside Luca Ghiotto and Clément Novalak. Gray experienced a consistent campaign in the series, finishing fourth during the 4 Hours of Spa-Francorchamps before a first podium in Mugello with third place. He finished the season with fifth place for the 4 Hours of Portimão, as his team finished seventh in the LMP2 standings.

Gray also partook in the Porsche Carrera Cup Italia for Ombra Racing from the second round onwards; he had a highest finish of fourth place twice and finished 14th in the standings.

=== 2025: ELMS title ===
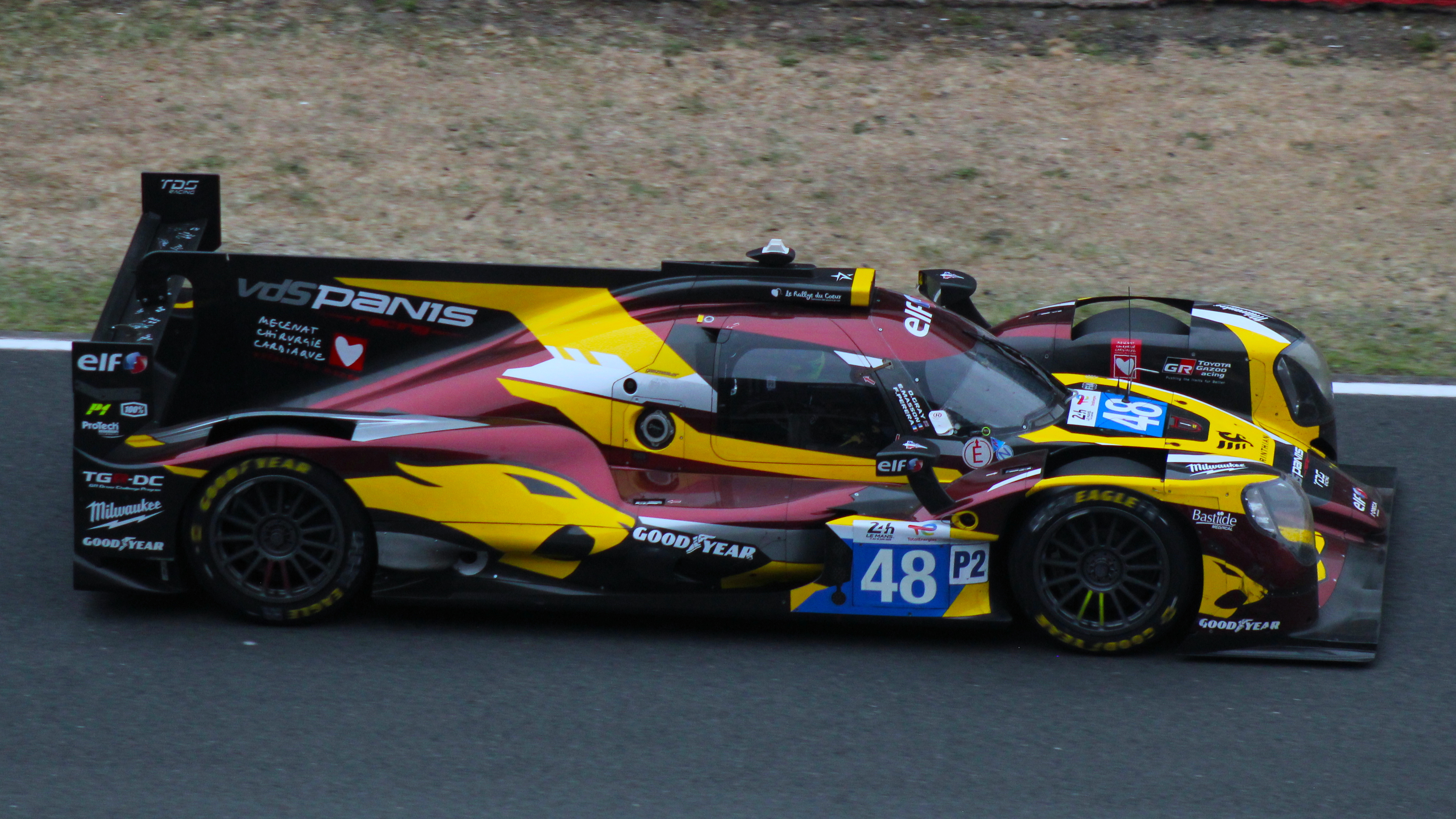
Gray's No. 48 car at the 2025 24 Hours of Le Mans

Gray switched to VDS Panis Racing for 2025 in the European Le Mans Series, where his teammates are Esteban Masson and Charles Milesi. The trio began the campaign by finishing third overall at Barcelona, which netted them second in the Pro class. Despite Milesi qualifying second at Le Castellet, the team finished sixth in the Pro class and a lowly 12th overall. Gray subsequently made his 24 Hours of Le Mans debut alongside Masson and Franck Perera. He inherited the lead during the fifth hour and remained there during the night. This lead, once over a minute long, was lost once a safety car was called to bunch up the field. The race for the LMP2 lead became a two-way fight between Gray's No. 48 and the No. 43 of Inter Europol, but despite a late penalty for the No. 43, the win was lost as Masson slowed with a suspension problem during the final hour and nursed the car home in second place.

At Imola, the VDS Panis crew bounced back: Gray took the lead from Jamie Chadwick at the end of the first hour and drove out a commanding lead, one which his teammates retained to give Gray his first sportscar victory. After creating an initial 12-second gap at the front in Spa, Gray and his teammates won again in dominant fashion. This looked to be the case again at Silverstone, where the No. 48 started from pole. However, a stop-and-go penalty for Gray, handed out for crossing a red light on pit exit, caused the team to finish down the order. Nevertheless, Gray and his teammates clinched the ELMS title at Portimão with their third win of the season; Gray contributed by taking the lead from Jonas Ried in the opening stint.

In October 2025, Gray was announced to be taking part in the FIA World Endurance Championship rookie test at the Bahrain International Circuit, where he sampled the championship-winning Ferrari 499P Hypercar.

== Personal life ==
Gray labels Michael Schumacher as his racing hero.

== Karting record ==
=== Karting career summary ===
Season	Series	Team	Position
2017	LGM Series - IAME Cadet		10th
2017	Super 1 National Championship - IAME Cadet		17th
2019	IAME International Final - X30 Junior	Dan Holland Racing	32nd
2019	Kartmasters British GP - X30 Junior	Dan Holland Racing	1st
2019	British Kart Championship - X30 Junior	Dan Holland Racing	1st
2019	IAME Euro Series - X30 Junior	Dan Holland Racing	2nd
2019	IAME Winter Cup - X30 Junior	Dan Holland Racing	5th
2019	WSK Euro Series - OK Junior	Lennox Racing Team	33rd
2020	CIK-FIA World Championship - OK	Leclerc by Lennox Racing	
2020	WSK Euro Series - OK	Leclerc by Lennox Racing	6th
2020	CIK-FIA European Championship - OK	Leclerc by Lennox Racing	10th
2020	25° South Garda Winter Cup - OK	Leclerc by Lennox Racing	
2020	WSK Super Master Series - OK	Leclerc by Lennox Racing	14th

== Racing record ==
=== Racing career summary ===
Season	Series	Team	Races	Wins	Poles	F/Laps	Podiums	Points	Position
2021	F4 British Championship	Fortec Motorsport	27	2	2	1	2	173	7th
2021	Italian F4 Championship	BVM Racing	6	0	0	0	0	0	37th
2022	Formula 4 UAE Championship	Hitech GP	8	0	0	0	1	41	15th
2022	F4 British Championship	Carlin	30	2	2	0	16	343	**2nd**
2023	FIA Formula 3 Championship	Rodin Carlin	18	0	0	0	0	0	28th
2024	European Le Mans Series - LMP2	Inter Europol Competition	6	0	0	0	1	47	7th
2024	Porsche Sprint Challenge Southern Europe - Pro	Ombra Racing	4	0	0	0	0	11	22nd
2024	Porsche Carrera Cup Italy	Ombra Racing	10	0	0	0	0	65	14th
2025	European Le Mans Series - LMP2	VDS Panis Racing	6	3	0	1	4	106	**1st**
2025	24 Hours of Le Mans - LMP2	VDS Panis Racing	1	0	0	0	1	—N/a	**2nd**
2026	European Le Mans Series - LMP2	Forestier Racing by Panis	6	2	2	1	3	84	**2nd**
2026	24 Hours of Le Mans – LMP2	Forestier Racing by Panis	1	0	0	0	1	—N/a	**3rd**

=== Complete F4 British Championship results ===
(key) (Races in bold indicate pole position) (Races in italics indicate fastest lap)

Year	Team	1	2	3	4	5	6	7	8	9	10	11	12	13	14	15	16	17	18	19	20	21	22	23	24	25	26	27	28	29	30	DC	Points
2021	Fortec Motorsport	THR1; 1; 6	THR1; 2; 11	THR1; 3; 4	SNE; 1; 4	SNE; 2; 10	SNE; 3; 11	BHI; 1; 5^{7}	BHI; 2; 9	BHI; 3; 11	OUL; 1; 5	OUL; 2; 6^{6}	OUL; 3 Ret	KNO; 1; 9	KNO; 2; 7	KNO; 3 Ret	**THR2**; **1**; 1	THR2; 2; 5^{11}	**THR2**; **3**; 1	CRO; 1; 8	CRO; 2; 6^{3}	CRO; 3; 9	SIL; 1 Ret	SIL; 2; 7^{3}	SIL; 3 Ret	DON; 1	DON; 2	DON; 3	BHGP; 1; 10	BHGP; 2; 4^{1}	BHGP; 3; 7	7th	173
2022	Carlin	DON; 1; 2	DON; 2 Ret	DON; 3; 3	BHI; 1; 3	BHI; 2; 2^{3}	BHI; 3; 2	THR1; 1; 3	THR1; 2; 4^{4}	THR1; 3 Ret	OUL; 1; 6	OUL; 2; 4^{2}	OUL; 3; 6	CRO; 1; 3	CRO; 2; 3^{5}	CRO; 3; 1	KNO; 1; 3	KNO; 2; 5	KNO; 3; 2	SNE; 1; 3	SNE; 2; 7	SNE; 3; 2	THR2; 1 Ret	THR2; 2; 6^{7}	THR2; 3; 12	**SIL**; **1**; 4	SIL; 2; 10	**SIL**; **3**; 1	BHGP; 1; 2	BHGP; 2 Ret	BHGP; 3; 3	2nd	343

=== Complete Italian F4 Championship results ===
(key) (Races in bold indicate pole position) (Races in italics indicate fastest lap)

Year	Team	1	2	3	4	5	6	7	8	9	10	11	12	13	14	15	16	17	18	19	20	21	DC	Points
2021	BVM Racing	LEC; 1	LEC; 2	LEC; 3	MIS; 1	MIS; 2	MIS; 3	VLL; 1	VLL; 2	VLL; 3	IMO; 1	IMO; 2	IMO; 3	RBR; 1	RBR; 2	RBR; 3	MUG; 1; 18	MUG; 2; 21	MUG; 3; 21	MNZ; 1; 12	MNZ; 2; 26	MNZ; 3; 12	37th	0

=== Complete Formula 4 UAE Championship results ===
(key) (Races in bold indicate pole position) (Races in italics indicate fastest lap)

Year	Team	1	2	3	4	5	6	7	8	9	10	11	12	13	14	15	16	17	18	19	20	DC	Points
2022	Hitech GP	YAS1; 1; 11	YAS1; 2; 3	YAS1; 3; 11	YAS1; 4; 8	DUB1; 1 Ret	DUB1; 2; 5	DUB1; 3; 5	DUB1; 4; 9	DUB2; 1	DUB2; 2	DUB2; 3	DUB2; 4	DUB3; 1	DUB3; 2	DUB3; 3	DUB3; 4	YAS2; 1	YAS2; 2	YAS3; 3	YAS4; 4	15th	41

=== Complete FIA Formula 3 Championship results ===
(key) (Races in bold indicate pole position) (Races in italics indicate fastest lap)

Year	Entrant	1	2	3	4	5	6	7	8	9	10	11	12	13	14	15	16	17	18	DC	Points
2023	Rodin Carlin	BHR; SPR; 21	BHR; FEA; 21	MEL; SPR; 20	MEL; FEA; 14	MON; SPR; 22	MON; FEA; 19	CAT; SPR; 15	CAT; FEA; 18	RBR; SPR; Ret	RBR; FEA; 14	SIL; SPR; 25	SIL; FEA; 20	HUN; SPR; 14	HUN; FEA; 27	SPA; SPR; 20	SPA; FEA; Ret	MNZ; SPR; Ret	MNZ; FEA; 16	28th	0

=== Complete European Le Mans Series results ===
(key) (Races in bold indicate pole position; results in italics indicate fastest lap)

Year	Entrant	Class	Chassis	Engine	1	2	3	4	5	6	Rank	Points
2024	Inter Europol Competition	LMP2	Oreca 07	Gibson GK428 4.2 L V8	CAT; 8	LEC; Ret	IMO; 7	SPA; 4	MUG; 3	ALG; 5	7th	47
2025	VDS Panis Racing	LMP2	Oreca 07	Gibson GK428 4.2 L V8	CAT; 2	LEC; 6	IMO; 1	SPA; 1	**SIL**; 8	ALG; 1	1st	106
2026	Forestier Racing by Panis	LMP2	Oreca 07	Gibson GK428 4.2 L V8	CAT; 1	**LEC**; Ret	**IMO**; 1	SPA; 2	SIL; 9	ALG; 4	2nd	84

=== Complete Porsche Carrera Cup Italy results ===
(key) (Races in bold indicate pole position) (Races in italics indicate fastest lap)

Year	Team	1	2	3	4	5	6	7	8	9	10	11	12	DC	Points
2024	Ombra Racing	MIS; 1	MIS; 2	IMO; 1; 15	IMO; 2 Ret	MUG; 1; 9	MUG; 2; 8	IMO; 1; 22	IMO; 2; 4	VLL; 1; 7	VLL; 2; 8	MNZ; 1; 12	MNZ; 2; 4	14th	65

=== Complete 24 Hours of Le Mans results ===
Year	Team	Co-Drivers	Car	Class	Laps	Pos.	Class Pos.
2025	(France) VDS Panis Racing	(France) Esteban Masson (France) Franck Perera	Oreca 07-Gibson	LMP2	367	19th	**2nd**
2026	(France) Forestier Racing by Panis	(France) Esteban Masson (France) Louis Rousset	Oreca 07-Gibson	LMP2	360	17th	**3rd**

Sporting positions
Preceded by Louis Delétraz; Robert Kubica; Jonny Edgar	European Le Mans Series; LMP2 Champion; 2025; With: Esteban Masson & Charles Milesi	Succeeded by Incumbent
