= David Morales (racing driver) =

American racing driver (born 2003)

- Nationality: (United States) American
- Born: 29 September 2003 (age 23) Fort Lauderdale, Florida, U.S.

GB3 Championship career
- Debut season: 2022
- Current team: JHR Developments
- Car number: 77
- Former teams: Arden Motorsport
- Starts: 47 (48 entries)
- Wins: 0
- Podiums: 1
- Poles: 0
- Fastest laps: 1
- Best finish: 13th in 2023

Previous series
- 2022 2021 2019-20 2019: Formula Regional Asian Championship; F4 British Championship; NACAM Formula 4 Championship; Lucas Oil Formula Car Race Series

David Morales (born 29 September 2003) is an American racing driver who last competed in the 2024 USF Pro 2000 Championship with TJ Speed Motorsports. He previously competed in the GB3 Championship.

== Career ==
=== Karting ===
From 2012 to 2014, Morales competed in various karting championships in his home state of Florida. His best result was eighth, in the Rotax Micro Max category of the 2012 Florida Winter Tour.

=== Lucas Oil Formula Car Race Series ===
Morales made his car racing debut in the 2019 Lucas Oil Formula Car Race Series.

=== NACAM Formula 4 Championship ===
Morales competed in the 2019-20 NACAM Formula 4 Championship with Euromotor Sport, where he finished ninth in the standings with one podium.

=== F4 British Championship ===
In 2021, Morales stepped up to the F4 British Championship with Arden International. He came 18th in the standings with two podiums.

=== Formula Regional Asian Championship ===
Morales raced in the 2022 Formula Regional Asian Championship with Evans GP Academy. He finished 33rd in the standings.

=== GB3 Championship ===
Morales competed in the 2022 GB3 Championship with Arden International. He claimed third place at Oulton Park for his one and only podium finish, and finished 22nd in the overall standings.

=== Formula Regional Oceania Championship ===
On 10 December 2022, it was announced that Morales would compete in the 2023 Formula Regional Oceania Championship with M2 Competition. He won race 3 of round 1 at Highlands Motorsport Park, the Dorothy Smith Memorial Cup, his first win of his single-seater racing career.

=== USF Pro 2000 Championship ===
In February 2024, Morales was announced to be returning to the United States to contest the USF Pro 2000 Championship, racing with TJ Speed Motorsports.

== Karting record ==
=== Karting career summary ===
Season	Series	Position
2012	Florida Winter Tour - Rotax Micro Max	8th
2012	Florida Winter Tour - Vortex TaG Cadet	20th
2013	Florida Winter Tour - Rotax Micro Max	12th
2013	Florida Winter Tour - AM Engines Formula Vortex TaG Cadet	17th
2014	SKUSA Pro Tour - TaG Cadet	19th
2014	Mini ROK International Final - Bridgestone Final	13th
2014	Florida Winter Tour - AM Racing Kart Formula TaG Cadet	16th
2014	Florida Winter Tour - Rotax Micro Max	22nd
2014	Florida Winter Tour - AM Engines Rotax Mini Max	33rd

== Racing record ==
=== Racing career summary ===
Season	Series	Team	Races	Wins	Poles	F/Laps	Podiums	Points	Position
2019	Lucas Oil Formula Car Race Series		18	0	0	0	3	N/A	N/A
2019-20	NACAM Formula 4 Championship	Euromotor Sport	20	0	0	0	1	74	9th
2021	F4 British Championship	TRS Arden Junior Team	27	0	0	0	2	40	18th
2022	Formula Regional Asian Championship	Evans GP Academy	15	0	0	0	0	0	33rd
2022	GB3 Championship	Arden Motorsport	24	0	0	1	1	130	22nd
2022	Praga Cup	Arden by Idola	2	0	0	1	0	37	18th
2022	Prototype Challenge - Radical	Valour Performance Technology	2	0	0	0	0	0	NC†
2023	Formula Regional Oceania Championship	M2 Competition	15	1	0	1	2	200	6th
2023	GB3 Championship	JHR Developments	23	0	0	0	0	178	13th
2023	Eurocup-3	Drivex	2	0	0	0	0	0	21st
2024	USF Pro 2000 Championship	TJ Speed Motorsports	2	0	0	0	0	7	31st

* Season still in progress.

=== Complete NACAM Formula 4 Championship results ===
(key) (Races in bold indicate pole position) (Races in italics indicate fastest lap)

Year	Team	1	2	3	4	5	6	7	8	9	10	11	12	13	14	15	16	17	18	19	20	DC	Points
2019-20	Euromotor Sport	AHR; 1; 5	AHR; 2; 13	AGS; 1; 10	AGS; 2; 11	AGS; 3 Ret	PUE; 1; 6	PUE; 2; 12	PUE; 3; 12†	MER; 1 Ret	MER; 2; 6	MER; 3; 6	QUE1; 1; 11	QUE1; 2; 3	QUE1; 3; 6	QUE2; 1; 9	QUE2; 2; 7	QUE2; 3; 11	MTY; 1; 8	MTY; 2; 8	MTY; 3 Ret	9th	74

=== Complete F4 British Championship results ===
(key) (Races in bold indicate pole position) (Races in italics indicate fastest lap)

Year	Team	1	2	3	4	5	6	7	8	9	10	11	12	13	14	15	16	17	18	19	20	21	22	23	24	25	26	27	28	29	30	DC	Points
2021	TRS Arden Junior Team	THR1; 1	THR1; 2	THR1; 3	SNE; 1; 17	SNE; 2 Ret	SNE; 3; 16	BHI; 1 Ret	BHI; 2; 14	BHI; 3; 18	OUL; 1; 16	OUL; 2; 18	OUL; 3; 15	KNO; 1; 12	KNO; 2; 5	KNO; 3; 13	THR2; 1; 11	THR2; 2; 2	THR2; 3; 13	CRO; 1; 14	CRO; 2 Ret	CRO; 3; 8	SIL; 1; 9	SIL; 2 Ret	SIL; 3; 7	DON; 1; 15	DON; 2; 10	DON; 3; 15	BHGP; 1; 14	BHGP; 2; 3	BHGP; 3; 14	18th	40

=== Complete Formula Regional Asian Championship results ===
(key) (Races in bold indicate pole position) (Races in italics indicate the fastest lap of top ten finishers)

Year	Entrant	1	2	3	4	5	6	7	8	9	10	11	12	13	14	15	DC	Points
2022	Evans GP Academy	ABU; 1; 20†	ABU; 2; 17†	ABU; 3 Ret	DUB; 1; 17	DUB; 2; 15	DUB; 3 Ret	DUB; 1; 24	DUB; 2; 20	DUB; 3; 19	DUB; 1; 19	DUB; 2; 25	DUB; 3; 19	ABU; 1; 22	ABU; 2; 19	ABU; 3; 18	33rd	0

=== Complete GB3 Championship results ===
(key) (Races in bold indicate pole position) (Races in italics indicate fastest lap)

Year	Team	1	2	3	4	5	6	7	8	9	10	11	12	13	14	15	16	17	18	19	20	21	22	23	24	DC	Points
2022	Arden Motorsport	OUL; 1; 10	OUL; 2; 16	OUL; 3; 3^{1}	SIL1; 1; 18	SIL1; 2; 19	SIL1; 3; 4	DON1; 1; 15	DON1; 2; 22	DON1; 3 Ret	SNE; 1 Ret	SNE; 2; 21	SNE; 3; 8	SPA; 1; 13	SPA; 2; 16	SPA; 3 Ret	SIL2; 1; 18	SIL2; 2; 14	SIL2; 3; 9	BRH; 1; 12	BRH; 2; 14	BRH; 3; 12	DON2; 1 Ret	DON2; 2; 11	DON2; 3; 10	22nd	130
2023	JHR Developments	OUL; 1; 8	OUL; 2 Ret	OUL; 3; 9^{7}	SIL1; 1; 11	SIL1; 2 Ret	SIL1; 3 Ret	SPA; 1; 4	SPA; 2; 14	SPA; 3; 15^{6}	SNE; 1; 14	SNE; 2; 13	SNE; 3; 21	SIL2; 1; 14	SIL2; 2; 22	SIL2; 3 C	BRH; 1 Ret	BRH; 2; 10	BRH; 3; 7^{3}	ZAN; 1; 14	ZAN; 2; 11	ZAN; 3; 4^{5}	DON; 1; 12	DON; 2; 10	DON; 3; 10	13th	178

=== Complete Formula Regional Oceania Championship results ===
(key) (Races in bold indicate pole position) (Races in italics indicate fastest lap)

Year	Team	1	2	3	4	5	6	7	8	9	10	11	12	13	14	15	DC	Points
2023	M2 Competition	HIG; 1; 3	HIG; 2; 5	HIG; 3; 1	TER; 1; 9	TER; 2 Ret	TER; 3 Ret	MAN; 1; 4	MAN; 2; 9	MAN; 3; 5	HMP; 1; 10	HMP; 2; 10	HMP; 3; 9	TAU; 1; 14	TAU; 2; 13	TAU; 3; 10	6th	200

=== Complete Eurocup-3 results ===
(key) (Races in bold indicate pole position) (Races in italics indicate fastest lap)

Year	Team	1	2	3	4	5	6	7	8	9	10	11	12	13	14	15	16	DC	Points
2023	Drivex	SPA; 1	SPA; 2	ARA; 1	ARA; 2	MNZ; 1	MNZ; 2	ZAN; 1; 11	ZAN; 2; 15	JER; 1	JER; 2	EST; 1	EST; 2	CRT; 1	CRT; 2	CAT; 1	CAT; 2	21st	0

=== American open-wheel racing results ===
==== USF Pro 2000 Championship ====
(key) (Races in bold indicate pole position) (Races in italics indicate fastest lap) (Races with * indicate most race laps led)

Year	Team	1	2	3	4	5	6	7	8	9	10	11	12	13	14	15	16	17	18	Rank	Points
2024	TJ Speed Motorsports	STP; 1; 22	STP; 2 DNS	LOU; 1; 15	LOU; 2 DNS	LOU; 3 DNS	IMS; 1	IMS; 2	IMS; 3	IRP	ROA; 1	ROA; 2	ROA; 3	MOH; 1	MOH; 2	TOR; 1	TOR; 2	POR; 1	POR; 2	31st	7

^{*} Season still in progress.
