= Matthew Rees (racing driver) =

British racing driver (born 2005)

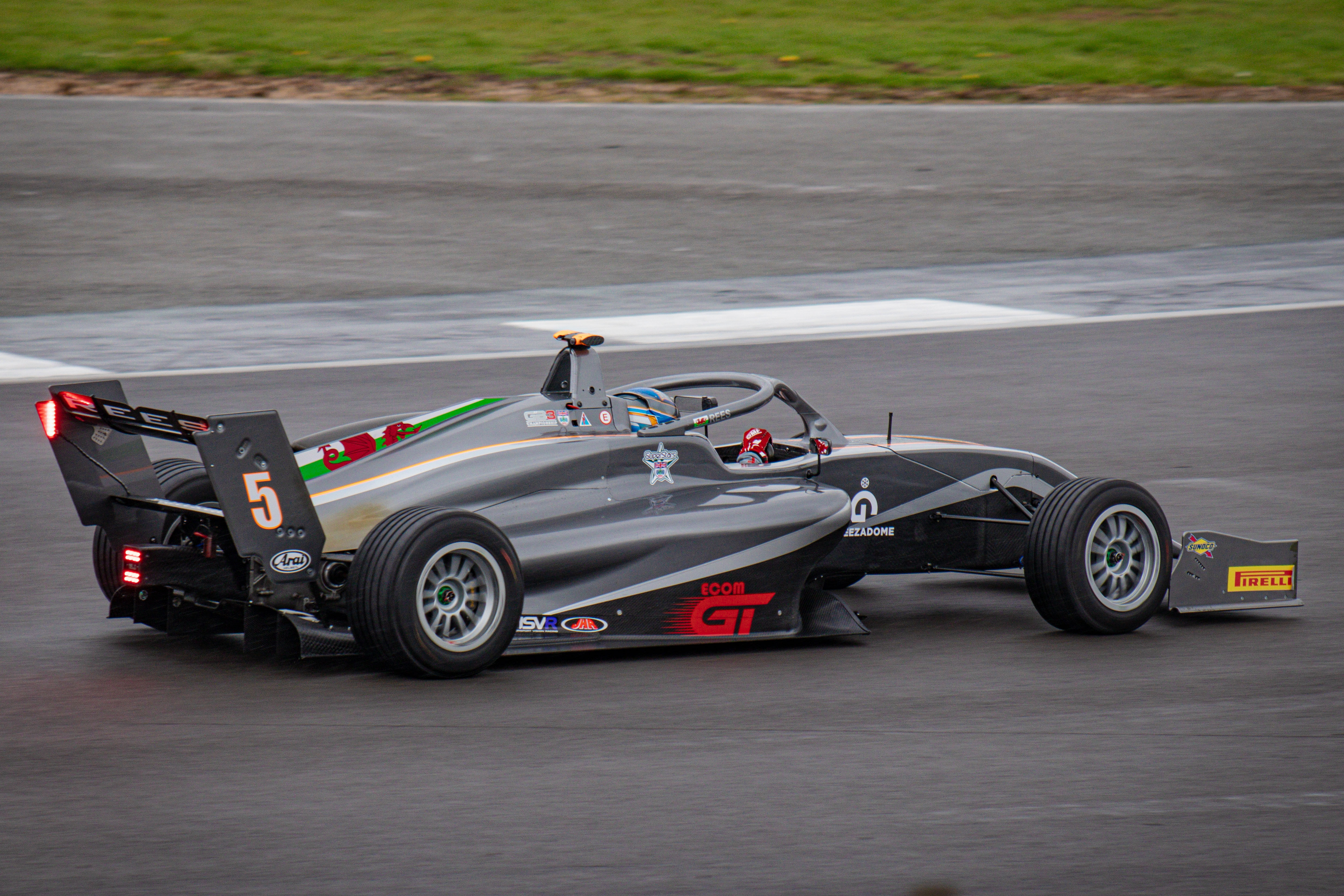
- Rees driving at Silverstone during the 2023 GB3 Championship
- Nationality: (United Kingdom) British
- Born: Matthew Owain Rees; 27 July 2005 (age 21) Cardiff, Wales

GB3 Championship career
- Debut season: 2022
- Current team: JHR Developments
- Car number: 5
- Starts: 47 (48 entries)
- Wins: 2
- Podiums: 9
- Poles: 3
- Fastest laps: 2
- Best finish: 5th in 2023

Previous series
- 2022-2023 2022 2021: GB3 Championship; Prototype Challenge; F4 British Championship

Championship titles
- 2021: F4 British Championship

Matthew Owain Rees (born 27 July 2005) is a British racing driver from Wales who most recently competed in the 2024 Porsche Carrera Cup Great Britain, having previously competed in the GB3 Championship from 2022 to 2023. He was the 2021 F4 British Championship champion, and is a BRDC Superstar.

== Career ==
=== Karting ===
Rees competed in various karting championships across the United Kingdom, before he drove in international karting in 2018 and 2019, including in the FIA European Karting Championship and the FIA Karting World Championship.

=== F4 British Championship ===
Rees made his car racing debut in the 2021 F4 British Championship, driving for JHR Developments. He took double pole position at round 1, but finished 13th in race 1 after an unsuccessful tyre gamble. After taking another double pole at the second round at Snetterton Circuit, he converted this into victory in race 1 and race 3. He took pole position for race 1 at the third round at Brands Hatch, making it his fifth consecutive pole of the season.

After a quieter middle of the season, Rees took double pole position at the penultimate round at Donington Park, and converted it into wins in the first and third race. Entering the final round of the season in the championship lead, Rees finished in the top-five in all three races, enough to seal the overall title and rookie title.

=== GB3 Championship ===
==== 2022 ====
On 12 January 2022, it was announced that Rees would step up to the 2022 GB3 Championship, driving again for JHR Developments. He finished third in his debut race, and took two other podiums finished across the season, including a win at Brands Hatch, and pole at the same weekend after Tom Lebbon received a grid penalty from the previous round. He finished sixth in the standings.

==== 2023 ====
Rees re-signed with JHR Developments for the 2023 GB3 Championship.

== Karting record ==
=== Karting career summary ===
Season	Series	Team	Position
2014	Super 1 National Championship — IAME Cadet	Soixante Racing Team	35th
2015	Super 1 National Championship — IAME Cadet	CKS	30th
2016	LGM Series — IAME Cadet		15th
2016	Super 1 National Championship — IAME Cadet	AIM Motorsport	9th
2016	ABkC British Open Championship — IAME Cadet		9th
2017	LGM Series — IAME Cadet		13th
2017	Super 1 National Championship — IAME Cadet		6th
2018	23° South Garda Winter Cup — OKJ	Ricky Flynn Motorsport	19th
2018	German Karting Championship — OKJ	Ricky Flynn Motorsport	13th
2018	CIK-FIA European Junior Championship — OKJ	Ricky Flynn Motorsport	34th
2018	CIK-FIA Karting World Championship — OKJ	Ricky Flynn Motorsport	20th
2018	WSK Final Cup — OKJ	Ricky Flynn Motorsport	14th
2019	WSK Champions Cup — OKJ	KR Motorsport	40th
2019	24° South Garda Winter Cup — OKJ	KR Motorsport	23rd
2019	WSK Super Masters Series — OKJ	KR Motorsport	13th
2019	CIK-FIA Karting European Championship — OKJ	KR Motorsport	NC

== Racing record ==
=== Racing career summary ===
Season	Series	Team	Races	Wins	Poles	F/Laps	Podiums	Points	Position
2021	F4 British Championship	JHR Developments	30	4	7	3	10	331	**1st**
2022	GB3 Championship	JHR Developments	24	1	1	2	3	310.5	6th
2022	Prototype Challenge - Radical	Valour Performance Technology	2	0	0	0	0	0	NC†
2023	GB3 Championship	JHR Developments	23	1	3	2	6	370	5th
2024	Porsche Carrera Cup Great Britain - Pro	Team Parker Racing	16	1	2	1	4	62	5th

=== Complete F4 British Championship results ===
(key) (Races in bold indicate pole position) (Races in italics indicate fastest lap)

Year	Team	1	2	3	4	5	6	7	8	9	10	11	12	13	14	15	16	17	18	19	20	21	22	23	24	25	26	27	28	29	30	DC	Points
2021	JHR Developments	**THR1**; **1**; 13	THR1; 2; 13	**THR1**; **3**; 5	**SNE**; **1**; 1	SNE; 2; 12	**SNE**; **3**; 1	BHI; 1; 9^{10}	**BHI**; **2**; 2	BHI; 3; 4	OUL; 1; 2	OUL; 2; 9^{9}	OUL; 3; 5	KNO; 1; 3	KNO; 2; 14	KNO; 3; 3	THR2; 1; 9	THR2; 2; 7^{6}	THR2; 3; 5	CRO; 1; 3	CRO; 2; 12^{3}	CRO; 3; 5	SIL; 1; 2	SIL; 2 NC	SIL; 3 Ret	**DON**; **1**; 1	DON; 2; 7^{9}	**DON**; **3**; 1	BHGP; 1; 5	BHGP; 2; 5^{6}	BHGP; 3; 4	1st	331

=== Complete GB3 Championship results ===
(key) (Races in bold indicate pole position) (Races in italics indicate fastest lap)

Year	Team	1	2	3	4	5	6	7	8	9	10	11	12	13	14	15	16	17	18	19	20	21	22	23	24	DC	Points
2022	JHR Developments	OUL; 1; 3	OUL; 2; 4	OUL; 3; 16	SIL1; 1; 12	SIL1; 2; 8	SIL1; 3 Ret	DON1; 1; 8	DON1; 2; 6	DON1; 3; 7^{13}	SNE; 1 Ret	SNE; 2; 4	SNE; 3; 12^{7}	SPA; 1 DSQ	SPA; 2; 7	SPA; 3; 15	SIL2; 1; 8	SIL2; 2; 6	SIL2; 3; 6^{6}	**BRH**; **1**; 1	BRH; 2; 3	BRH; 3; 13^{2}	DON2; 1; 17	DON2; 2; 6	DON2; 3; 9^{6}	6th	310.5
2023	JHR Developments	OUL; 1; 2	OUL; 2; 11	OUL; 3; 14^{10}	SIL1; 1; 3	SIL1; 2; 7	SIL1; 3; 23	SPA; 1 Ret	SPA; 2; 9	SPA; 3 Ret	**SNE**; **1**; 2	SNE; 2; 4	SNE; 3; 18^{6}	**SIL2**; **1**; 1	**SIL2**; **2**; 2	SIL2; 3 C	BRH; 1; 6	BRH; 2; 5	BRH; 3; 12^{8}	ZAN; 1; 6	ZAN; 2; 7	ZAN; 3; 14^{5}	DON; 1; 2	DON; 2; 4	DON; 3; 13^{8}	5th	370
