= Ugo (given name) =

Ugo is the Italian form of Hugh, a name of Germanic origin. Its diminutive form is Ugolino. It is also a Nigerian Igbo first name.

People with the name include:

- Vgo (stonemason) (fl. 12th century), a medieval stonemason
- Ugo Bassi (1800–1849), a Roman Catholic priest and Italian nationalist
- Ugo Betti (1892–1953), Italian judge and author
- Ugo Boncompagni (1502–1585), the birth name of Pope Gregory XIII, pope from 1572 to 1585
- Ugo Cavallero (1880-1943), Italian military commander
- Ugo Correani (1935–1992), Italian/German fashion designer
- Ugo da Carpi (fl. 1502–1532), Italian printmaker
- Ugo Coccia (1895–1932), Italian journalist and politician
- Ugo Didier (born 2001), French Paralympic swimmer
- Ugo Ehiogu (1972–2017), English football player
- Ugo Fano (1912–2001), Italian physicist
- Ugo Foscolo (1778-1827), Italian poet and writer
- Ugo Gabrieli (born 1989), Italian footballer
- Ugo Giachery (1896–1989), Italian convert to the Bahá'í faith
- Ugo Humbert (born 1998), French tennis player
- Ugo La Malfa (1903–1979), an Italian politician of the PRI
- Ugo Mattei (born 1961), professor of international and comparative law at UC Hastings
- Ugo Monneret de Villard (1881–1954), Italian archeologist and art historian
- Ugo Monye (born 1983), English international rugby union player
- Ugo Mulas (1928–1973), Italian photographer
- Ugo Panziera (fl. late 13th – early 14th century), Italian theologian and friar
- Ugo Rondinone (born 1964), contemporary artist
- Ugo Sansonetti (1919–2019), Italian businessman and athlete
- Ugo Tognazzi (1922–1990), Italian actor
- Ugo Ugochukwu (born 2007), American racing driver
- Ugo Zagato (1890–1968), Italian automobile designer
