= Ugolino =

Ugolino is an Italian masculine given name that is a diminutive form of Ugo. It also occurs as a surname. Notable people with the name include:

== Artists, writers and musicians ==
- Ugolino di Nerio (1280?–1349), Italian painter active in Siena and Florence
- Ugolino di Tedice (died after 1277), Italian painter
- Ugolino Brunforte (c. 1262–c. 1348), Italian Friar Minor and chronicler
- Ugolino di Prete Ilario, 14th-century Italian painter
- Ugolino di Vieri (sculptor) (fl. 1328–1380), Italian sculptor and goldsmith
- Ugolino di Vieri (poet) (1438–1516), Italian poet and notary
- Ugolino of Forlì (c. 1380–c. 1457), Italian composer and musical theorist
- Giuseppe Ugolino (1826–1897), Italian sculptor and painter
- Mariví Ugolino (1943–2024), Uruguayan sculptor

== Other people ==
- Ugolino di Conti (c. 1170–1241), head of the Catholic Church and ruler of the Papal States as Pope Gregory IX
- Ugolino da Gualdo Cattaneo (1200–1260), Italian Roman Catholic professed religious and friar of the Order of Saint Augustine
- Ugolino della Gherardesca (c. 1220–1289), Italian nobleman who features prominently in Canto 32 of Dante's Inferno
- Ugolino of Gallura (Nino Visconti; died 1298), Sardinian judge
- Ugolino de Vivaldo (fl. 1291), Genoese explorer
- Ugolino Gonzaga (1320–1362), Italian condottiero
- Ugolino II Trinci, Lord of Foligno (1343–1353)
- Ugolino III Trinci, Lord of Foligno (1386–1415)
- Ugolino Giugni (died 1470), Italian Roman Catholic prelate
- Tiberio Ugolino (fl. 1483–1519), Italian Roman Catholic prelate
- Ugolino Martelli (bishop) (died 1523), Italian Roman Catholic prelate
- Nicola Ugolino (fl. 1720s), Italian lute player and composer
- Blaisio Ugolino, 18th-century Italian polyhistor
- Ugolino Martelli (1860–1934), Italian botanist, biologist and mycologist
- Ugolino Vivaldi Pasqua (1885–1910), Italian aviator

== See also ==
- Ugolini (disambiguation)
- Ugolino and His Sons (disambiguation)
