= Ugolino di Vieri =

Ugolino di Vieri may refer to:

- Ugolino di Vieri (sculptor) (fl. 1328–1380), Italian sculptor and goldsmith
- Ugolino di Vieri (poet) (1438–1516), Italian poet and notary

== See also ==
- Ugolino
- Vieri (surname)
