= Américo Murolo =

Brazilian footballer

Personal information
- Full name: Américo Murolo
- Date of birth: 28 April 1932
- Place of birth: São Paulo, Brazil
- Date of death: 10 December 2014 (aged 82)
- Place of death: Bragança Paulista, Brazil
- Height: 1.70 m (5 ft 7 in)
- Position: Forward

Youth career
- Jabaquara

Senior career*
Years	Team	Apps	(Gls)
1951–1952	XV de Jaú		
1952–1954	Linense		
1955–1956	Vicenza	25	(10)
1958–1962	Palmeiras	176	(102)
1962–1966	Guarani		
1967	Flamengo	28	(3)
1968–1969	Portuguesa Santista		
- * Club domestic league appearances and goals as of 4 October 2024

Américo Murolo (28 April 1932 – 10 December 2014) was a Brazilian professional footballer who played as a forward.

== Career ==
Revealed by the Jabaquara AC aspirants, Amérilo Murolo played professionally for XV de Jaú and CA Linense, where in 1952 he won the second tier of football in São Paulo. In 1955 he moved to Vicenza, playing the season in Italy, and returning in 1958 to SE Palmeiras, a team whose team became an idol as it was one of the highlights in winning the 1959 state championship.

He also marked a season for Guarani FC, and played for Flamengo and Portuguesa Santista before retiring.

== Death ==
Murolo died on 10 December 2014 at the age of 82, from respiratory failure.

== Honours ==
Linense

- Campeonato Paulista Série A2: 1952

Palmeiras

- Campeonato Paulista: 1959
- Taça Brasil: 1960
- Troféu Roberto Ugolini: 1960
