= Panziera =

Panziera is an Italian surname. Notable people with the surname include:

- Margherita Panziera (born 1995), Italian swimmer
- Ugo Panziera (circa 1260 – circa 1330), Italian theologian, Franciscan friar, missionary, and writer

== See also ==
- Panzeri
