= Ugolini =

Ugolini is an Italian surname, derived from the given name Ugolino. Notable people with the surname include:

- Agostino Ugolini (1758–1824), Italian painter
- Ascanio Ugolini (died 1660), Italian Roman Catholic prelate
- Augusto Ugolini (1887–1977), Italian army officer
- Gérard Ugolini (born 1949), French athlete
- Giovanni Francesco Ugolini (born 1953), Sammarinese politician
- Loredano Ugolini (born 1927), Italian comic artist and illustrator
- Luigi Ugolini (1891–1980), Italian writer
- Luigi Maria Ugolini (1895–1936), Italian archaeologist
- Massimo Andrea Ugolini (born 1978), Sammarinese politician
- Rolando Ugolini (1924–2014), Italian-British footballer
- Stefano Ugolini (died 1681), Italian Roman Catholic prelate
- Vincenzo Ugolini (1578–1638), Italian composer

== Places ==
- Ugolini Peak, New Zealand

== See also ==
- Troféu Roberto Ugolini, former Brazilian football tournament
- Ugolino, given name and surname
