= Francesco Pitti =

Italian poet (fl. 1497)

Francesco Pitti (fl. 1497), also known as Pizio da Montevarchi, was an Italian poet and humanist, best remembered for his translation of Seneca the Younger's Hippolytus in 1497, which was remarked for its hendecasyllable. A student of Ugolino di Vieri, he was a member of the Order of Friars Minor Capuchin. Together with Giovanni Badoer and Filippo Galli, he formed an Arcadian Greek literary society in Venice, and published several eclogues. His archives are preserved by the Biblioteca Classense.
