= Tina Hausmann =

Swiss racing driver (born 2006)

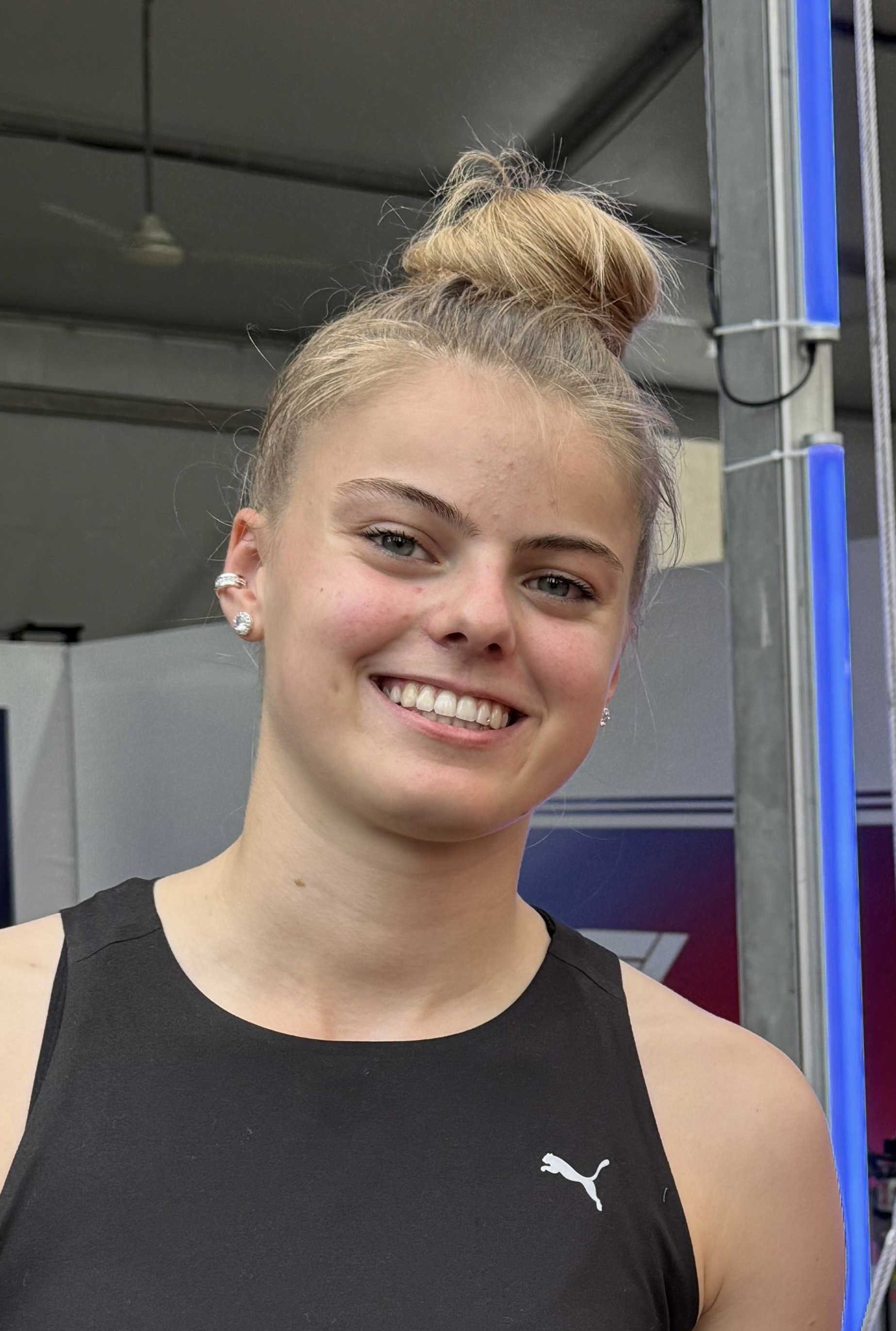
- Hausmann at the 2025 Singapore Grand Prix
- Nationality: (Switzerland) Swiss
- Born: Tina Larissa Hausmann; 5 October 2006 (age 20) Zürich, Switzerland

F1 Academy
- Years active: 2024–2025
- Teams: Prema Racing
- Car number: 78
- Starts: 27 (28 entries)
- Wins: 0
- Podiums: 0
- Poles: 0
- Fastest laps: 1
- Best finish: 8th in 2025

Previous series
- 2024–2025; 2023; 2023; 2023: F1 Academy; Italian F4; Euro 4; Formula Winter Series

Championship titles
- 2023; 2023: Italian F4 Woman Trophy; Euro 4 Woman Trophy

Tina Larissa Hausmann (born 5 October 2006) is a Swiss racing driver.

Hausmann previously competed for AKM Motorsport in Formula 4, scoring an overall podium in the Formula Winter Series and winning the women's trophy in both Italian F4 and Euro 4. She also competed in F1 Academy for Prema Racing representing Aston Martin.

== Junior career ==
=== Karting ===
Hausmann made her competitive karting debut in the 2019 Rotax Max Challenge Switzerland in the Mini and Junior categories, finishing in eighth and fourth. She returned to karting in 2021 and competed in the ADAC Kart Masters in the OK category. She has also competing in a handful of races in her home country of Switzerland and in Germany as well.

=== Formula 4 ===
Hausmann made her debut in Formula 4 machinery in the inaugural season of the Formula Winter Series with AKM Motorsport. In her first F4 race at Circuito de Jerez, she came in fourth and in the second race, she scored her first single-seater podium coming in third.

Hausmann also drove in the 2023 Italian F4 Championship and the 2023 Euro 4 Championship for AKM Motorsport, coming up pointless in both series, as she finished in the Italian F4 championship in 40th, she was only the only full time entrant for the team. She won the women's title. Hausmann finished in 20th in the Euro 4 Championship, her highest position was 11th and she beat Aurelia Nobels as the best placed woman in the championship.

==== F1 Academy ====
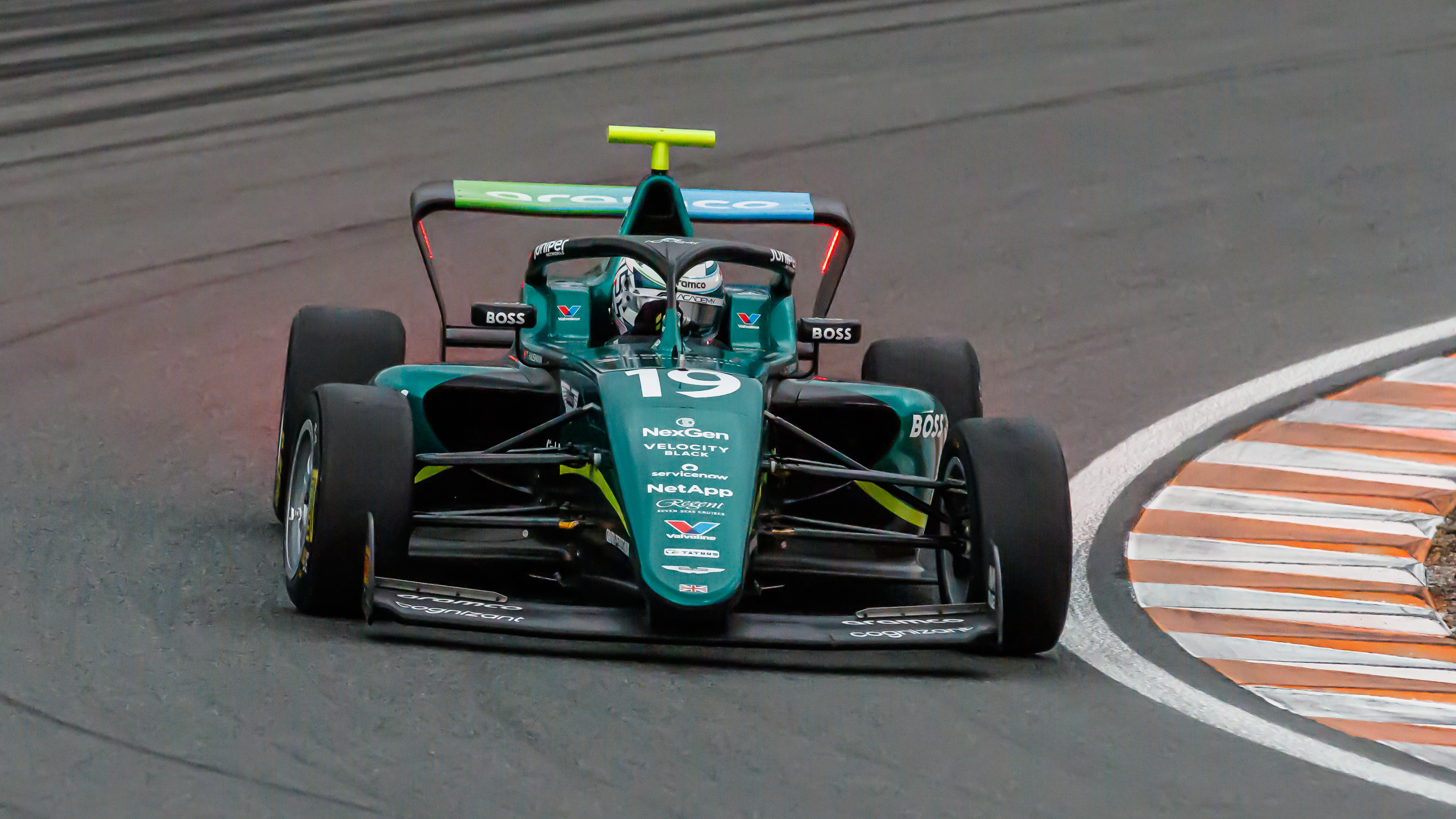
Hausmann competing in an F1 Academy race at Zandvoort in 2024.

Hausmann was announced to compete in the 2024 season of F1 Academy, an all-female racing series in Formula 4 machinery, with Prema Racing representing Aston Martin. Hausmann ended the season by finishing Race 3 at Abu Dhabi in fourth, her highest finishing place of the season.

Hausmann remained with Prema Racing and Aston Martin for the 2025 season. At Montreal, she scored her first points for the fastest lap in Race 2 as she finished in seventh. Chloe Chambers set the fastest lap in the race but did not finish in the top 8 and was ineligible to score the point for it. Hausmann scored the point for setting the fastest lap amongst the top 8. Hausmann then finished Race 3 in fourth, her highest finishing place of the season. For the first time in the series, Hausmann started in the front row in second position for the reverse grid Race 1 at Zandvoort but crashed in lap 2. In the final round of the season at Las Vegas, Hausmann effectively started in second for the reverse grid Race 1 after Emma Felbermayr suffered clutch issues at the beginning of the formation lap. However, Hausmann was taken out by Maya Weug during the formation lap. Hausmann departed Aston Martin after the season ended.

== Personal life ==
Hausmann studied in a Swiss gymnasium from 2019 until 2025, where she completed a bilingual matura in German and English. Her final thesis was related to fuel sustainability in Formula One and was completed in partnership with Saudi Aramco. She received a grade of 6.0, the highest grade in the Swiss system. As of September 2026, Hausmann is studying a bachelor's degree in business administration and management at University of St. Gallen.

Hausmann also works as a keynote speaker.

== Karting record ==
=== Karting career summary ===
Season	Series	Team	Position
2019	Swiss Rotax Max Challenge - Mini	Speed-Racing	8th
2019	Swiss Rotax Max Challenge - Junior	Speed-Racing	4th
2021	ADAC Kart Masters — OK	CRG Holland	NC

== Racing record ==
=== Racing career summary ===
Season	Series	Team	Races	Wins	Poles	F/Laps	Podiums	Points	Position
2023	Formula Winter Series	AKM Motorsport	4	0	0	0	1	27	10th
2023	Italian F4 Championship	AKM Motorsport	19	0	0	0	0	0	40th
2023	Euro 4 Championship	AKM Motorsport	9	0	0	0	0	0	20th
2024	F1 Academy	Prema Racing	14	0	0	0	0	31	10th
2024	Formula 4 UAE Championship	Xcel Motorsport	3	0	0	0	0	0	40th
2025	F1 Academy	Prema Racing	13	0	0	0	0	50	8th

* Season still in progress.

=== Complete Formula Winter Series results ===
(key) (Races in bold indicate pole position; races in italics indicate fastest lap)

Year	Team	1	2	3	4	5	6	7	8	DC	Points
2023	AKM Motorsport	JER; 1; 4	JER; 2; 3	CRT; 1; 15†	CRT; 2 Ret	NAV; 1	NAV; 2	CAT; 1	CAT; 2	10th	27

=== Complete Italian F4 Championship results ===
(key) (Races in bold indicate pole position) (Races in italics indicate fastest lap)

Year	Team	1	2	3	4	5	6	7	8	9	10	11	12	13	14	15	16	17	18	19	20	21	22	DC	Points
2023	AKM Motorsport	IMO; 1; 19	IMO; 2; 20	IMO; 3	IMO; 4 Ret	MIS; 1 Ret	MIS; 2 WD	MIS; 3 WD	SPA; 1; 24	SPA; 2 Ret	SPA; 3; 23	MNZ; 1; 20	MNZ; 2; 21	MNZ; 3; 22	LEC; 1; 27	LEC; 2; 16	LEC; 3; 20	MUG; 1; 19	MUG; 2; 27	MUG; 3; 20	VLL; 1; 25	VLL; 2 Ret	VLL; 3; 25	40th	0

=== Complete Euro 4 Championship results ===
(key) (Races in bold indicate pole position; races in italics indicate fastest lap)

Year	Team	1	2	3	4	5	6	7	8	9	DC	Points
2023	AKM Motorsport	MUG; 1; 23	MUG; 2; 21	MUG; 3; 17	MNZ; 1; 11	MNZ; 2; 23	MNZ; 3; 16	CAT; 1; 16	CAT; 2; 13	CAT; 3; 13	20th	0

=== Complete Formula 4 UAE Championship results ===
(key) (Races in bold indicate pole position; races in italics indicate fastest lap)

Year	Team	1	2	3	4	5	6	7	8	9	10	11	12	13	14	15	DC	Points
2024	Xcel Motorsport	YMC1; 1	YMC1; 2	YMC1; 3	YMC2; 1 Ret	YMC2; 2; 27	YMC2; 3; 21	DUB1; 1	DUB1; 2	DUB1; 3	YMC3; 1	YMC3; 2	YMC3; 3	DUB2; 1	DUB2; 2	DUB2; 3	40th	0

=== Complete F1 Academy results ===
(key) (Races in bold indicate pole position; races in italics indicate fastest lap)

Year	Team	1	2	3	4	5	6	7	8	9	10	11	12	13	14	15	DC	Points
2024	Prema Racing	JED; 1; 6	JED; 2; 13	MIA; 1 Ret	MIA; 2 Ret	CAT; 1; 9	CAT; 2; 8	ZAN; 1; 11	ZAN; 2; 9	SIN; 1; 10	SIN; 2; 16	LSL; 1; 15	LSL; 2 C	YMC; 1; 15	YMC; 2; 9	YMC; 3; 4	10th	31
2025	Prema Racing	SHA; 1; 13	SHA; 2; 15	JED; 1; 6	JED; 2; 6	MIA; 1; 7	MIA; 2 C	MTL; 1; 6	MTL; 2; 7	MTL; 2; 4	ZAN; 1 Ret	ZAN; 2; 5	SIN; 1; 10	SIN; 2; 14	LVG; 1 DNS	LVG; 2; 8	8th	50

Sporting positions
Preceded by Maya Weug	Italian F4 Championship; Women's Champion; 2023	Succeeded by Defunct
