= Kabir Anurag =

Singaporean racing driver (born 2007)

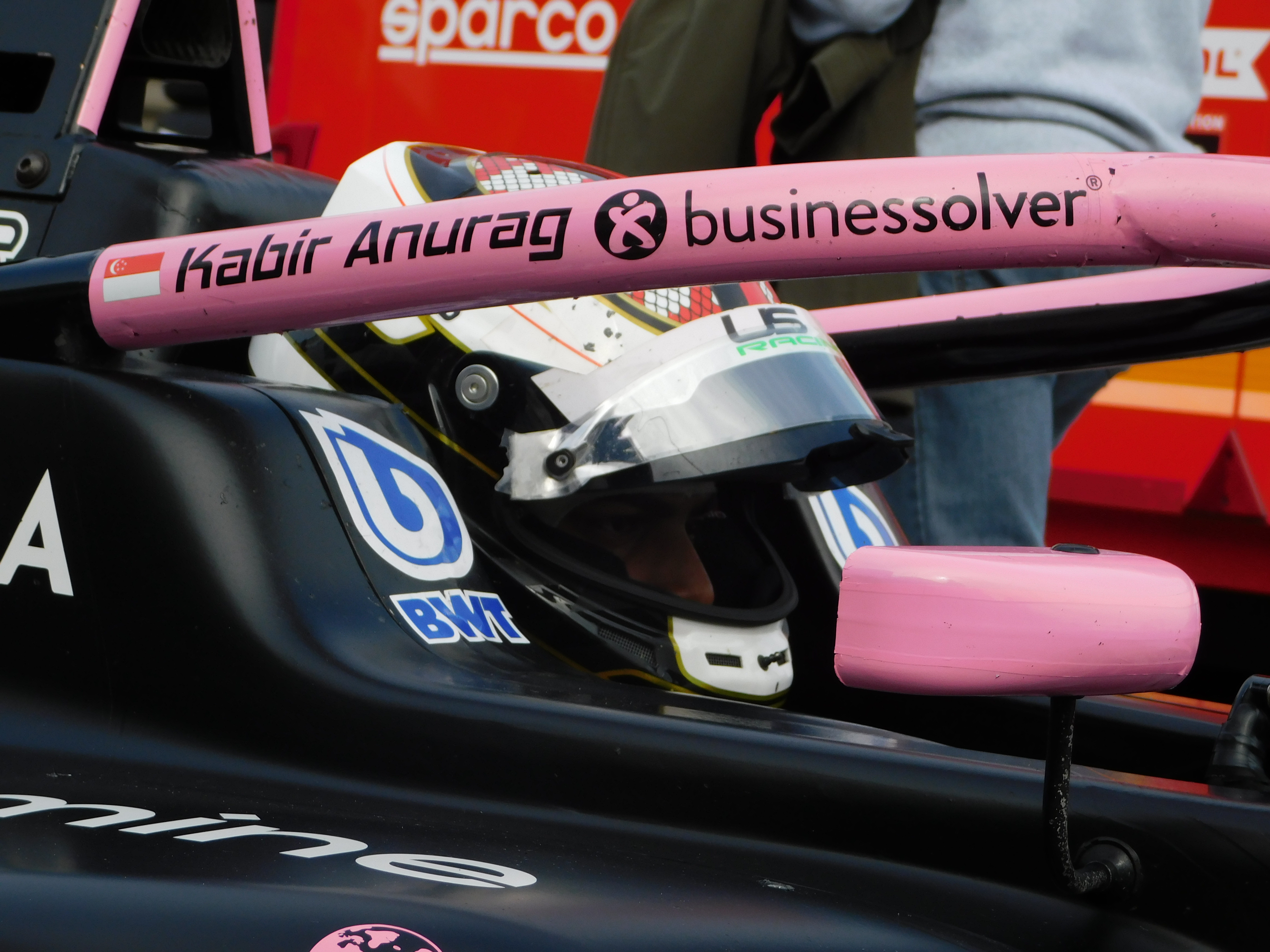
- Anurag in 2024
- Nationality: Singapore
- Born: 8 August 2007 (age 19) Singapore

Formula Regional European Championship career
- Debut season: 2026
- Current team: ART Grand Prix
- Car number: 19
- Starts: 19
- Wins: 0
- Podiums: 0
- Poles: 0
- Fastest laps: 0
- Best finish: 21st in 2026

Previous series
- 2026 2026 2025 2024 2024 2024–2025 2023–2025: Eurocup-3; FR Middle East; GB3; Formula Trophy UAE; Euro 4 / E4; Formula Winter Series; Italian F4
- Statistics up to date as of 15 November 2026.

Kabir Anurag (born 8 August 2007) is a Singaporean racing driver who last competed in the Formula Regional European Championship with ART Grand Prix as part of the Alpine Academy.

Anurag previously raced in Italian F4 from 2023 to 2025. He is a member of the Alpine Academy.

== Career ==
=== Karting ===
Anurag started karting in Europe in 2022, with a best race result of eighth in the finale of the WSK Open Cup, in the KZ2 category.

=== Formula 4 ===
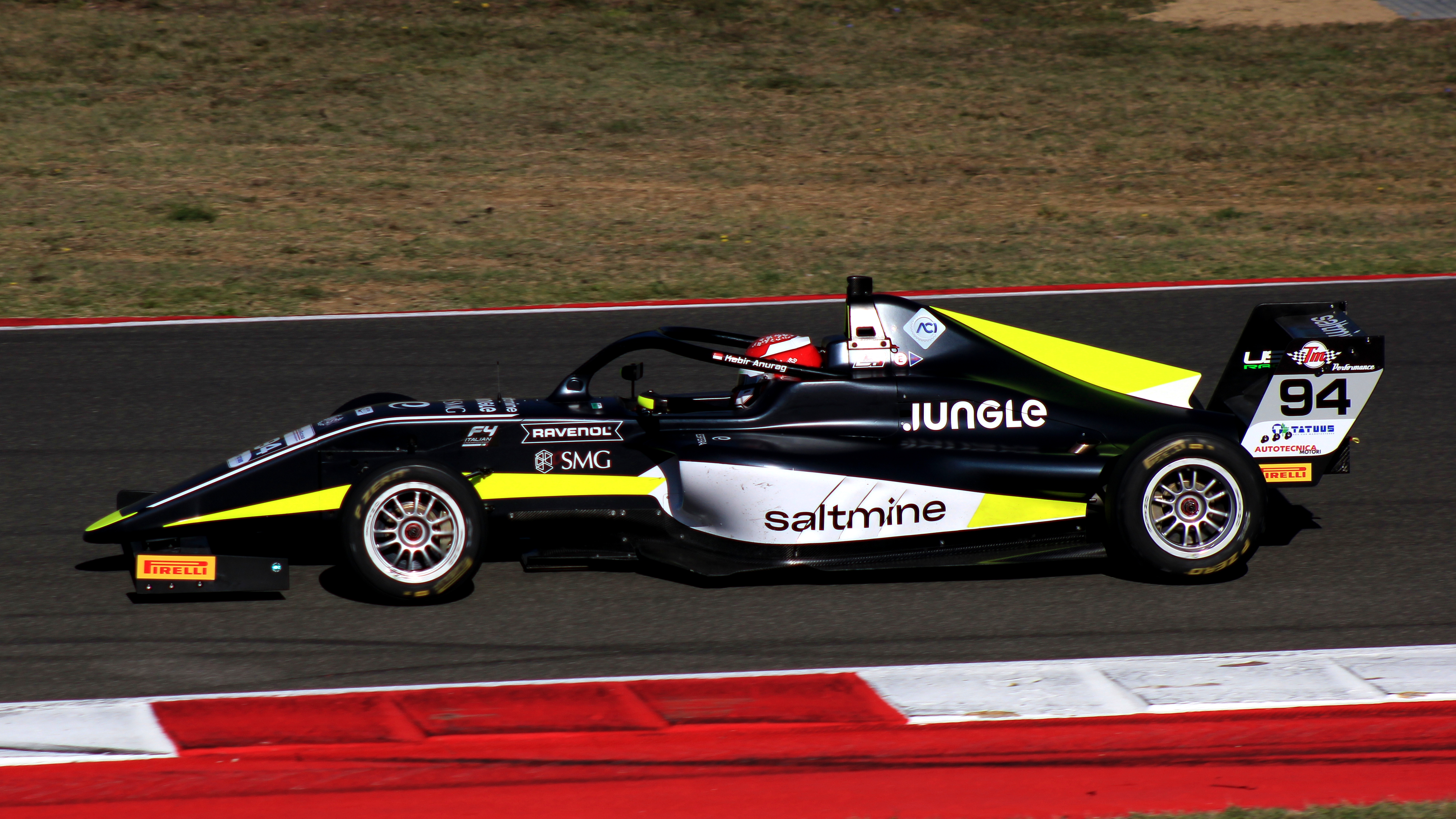
Anurag driving at the Mugello Circuit during the 2023 Italian F4 Championship

==== 2023 ====
Anurag made his F4 debut in the latter stages of the 2023 season, driving for R-ace GP in round 5 of the Italian F4 Championship. He scored a best result of 17th, in the second race of round 5 at Circuit Paul Ricard. Anurag then joined US Racing from round 6 until the end of the season.

==== 2024 ====
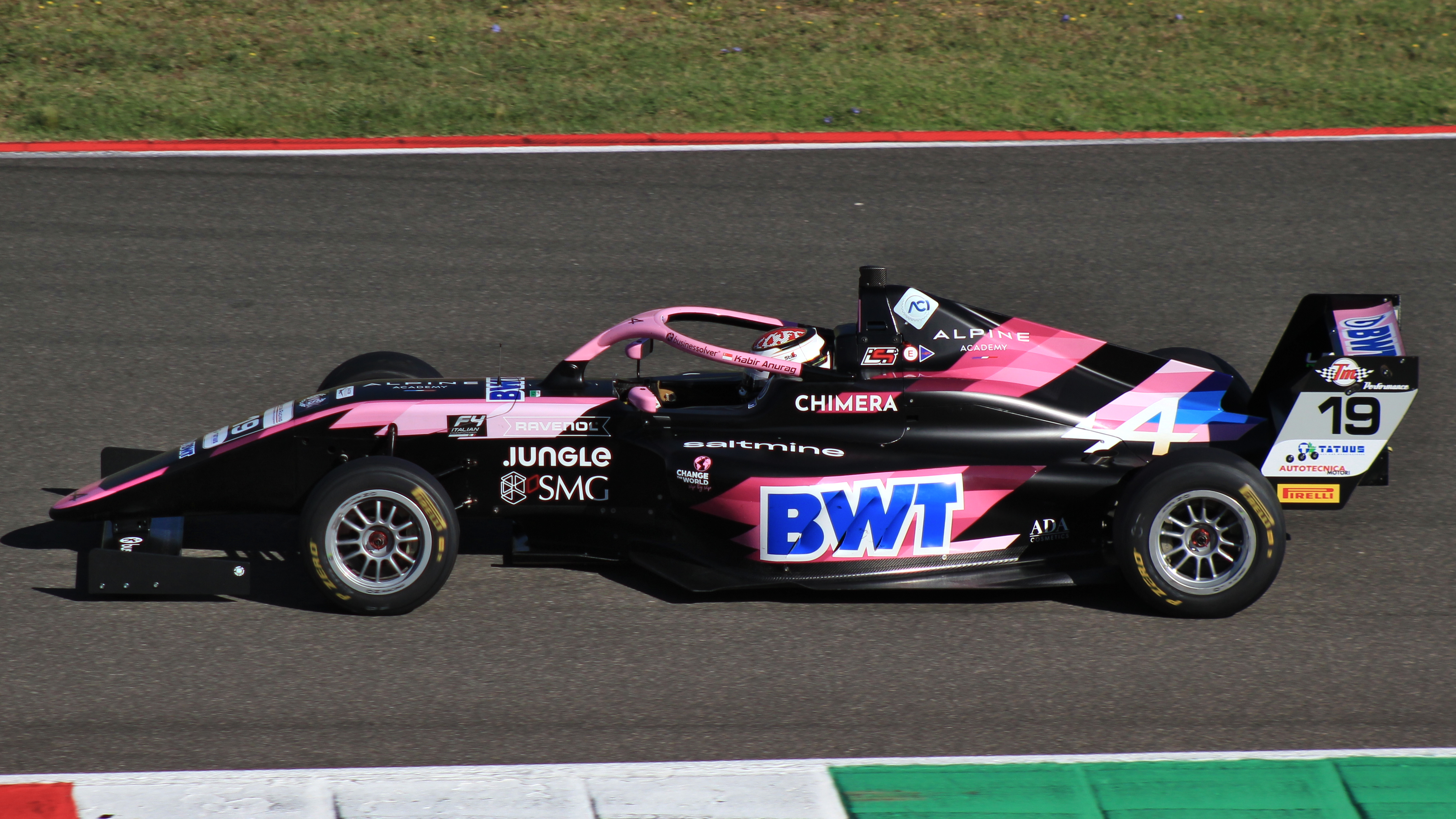
Anurag driving at the Mugello Circuit during the 2024 Italian F4 Championship

Anurag was then announced to be joining the 2024 Formula Winter Series in preparation for a full Italian F4 season with US Racing. He had a strong season, with his most notable result being a fifth place, along with a fastest lap in the third round at MotorLand Aragón. He ended the season 14th in the standings, placing himself high amongst a competitive grid.

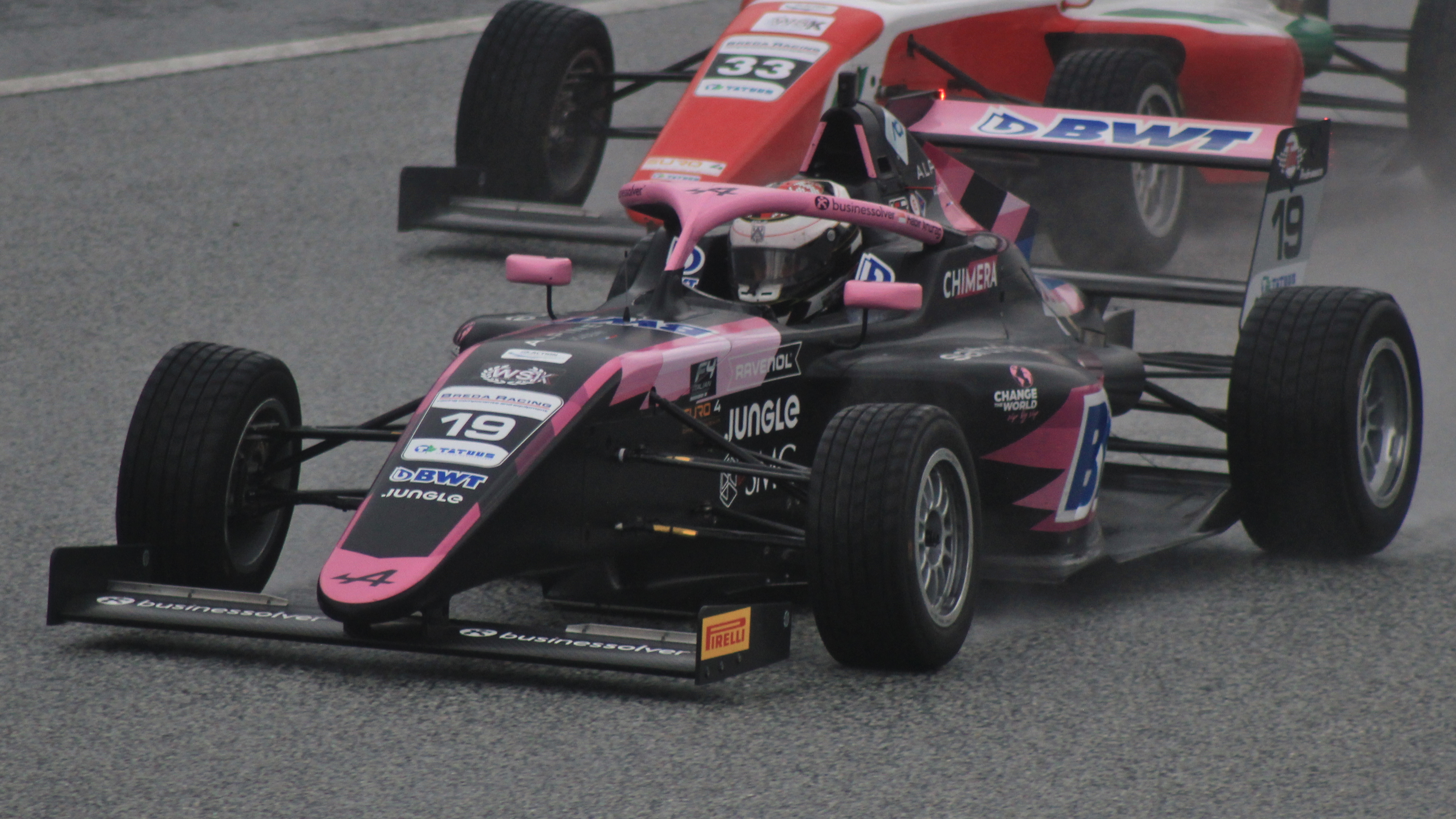
Anurag driving at the Red Bull Ring during the 2024 Euro 4 Championship

In Italian F4, Anurag finished in the points twice throughout the season and finished 20th in the standings, with ten points.

==== 2025 ====
Anurag remained with US Racing for the 2025 Italian F4 Championship. Later that year, Anurag also raced in the E4 Championship with the team.

=== Formula Regional ===
==== 2025 ====
In October 2025, Anurag stepped up to GB3 to compete in the final two rounds with Xcel Motorsport.

==== 2026 ====
In 2026, Anurag stepped up to race for ART Grand Prix in the Formula Regional Middle East and Formula Regional Europe. At the end of November, he moved to RPM to compete in the Macau Grand Prix.

=== Formula One ===
In April 2024, it was confirmed that Anurag was signed by the Alpine Academy as their latest junior driver, becoming the first Singaporean to join the Academy.

== Karting record ==
=== Karting career summary ===
Season	Series	Team	Position
2022	WSK Open Cup - OK	Ricky Flynn Motorsport	26th
2023	WSK Super Master Series - KZ2	KR Motorsport	85th
2023	WSK Open Series - KZ2	KR Motorsport	30th

== Racing record ==
=== Racing career summary ===
Season	Series	Team	Races	Wins	Poles	F/Laps	Podiums	Points	Position
2023	Italian F4 Championship	R-ace GP	3	0	0	0	0	0	41st
2023	Italian F4 Championship	US Racing	6	0	0	0	0	0	41st
2024	Formula Winter Series	US Racing	11	0	0	1	0	25	14th
2024	Italian F4 Championship	US Racing	21	0	0	0	0	10	20th
2024	Euro 4 Championship	US Racing	9	0	0	0	0	4	18th
2024	Formula Trophy UAE	Xcel Motorsport	7	2	0	1	2	80	**3rd**
2025	Formula Winter Series	US Racing	11	2	1	3	4	138	4th
2025	Italian F4 Championship	US Racing	20	0	0	1	0	35	16th
2025	E4 Championship	US Racing	9	0	0	0	2	68	6th
2025	GB3 Championship	Xcel Motorsport	6	0	0	0	0	38	27th
2026	Formula Regional Middle East Trophy	ART Grand Prix	11	0	0	0	0	62	9th
2026	Formula Regional European Championship	ART Grand Prix	19	0	0	0	0	21	21st
2026	Eurocup-3	Griffin Core	2	0	0	0	0	0	NC†
2026	Macau Grand Prix	RPM	0	0	0	0	0	—N/a	TBD

* Season still in progress.

† As Anurag was a guest driver, he was ineligible for points.

=== Complete Italian F4 Championship results ===
(key) (Races in bold indicate pole position; races in italics indicate fastest lap)

Year	Team	1	2	3	4	5	6	7	8	9	10	11	12	13	14	15	16	17	18	19	20	21	22	23	24	25	DC	Points
2023	R-ace GP	IMO; 1	IMO; 2	IMO; 3	IMO; 4	MIS; 1	MIS; 2	MIS; 3	SPA; 1	SPA; 2	SPA; 3	MON; 1	MON; 2	MON; 3	LEC; 1; 26	LEC; 2; 17	LEC; 3 Ret										41st	0
2023	US Racing																	MUG; 1 Ret	MUG; 2; 24	MUG; 3 Ret	VAL; 1; 26	VAL; 2 Ret	VAL; 3; 26				41st	0
2024	US Racing	MIS; 1; 29	MIS; 2; 23	MIS; 3 Ret	IMO; 1 Ret	IMO; 2; 22	IMO; 3; 16	VAL; 1; 29†	VAL; 2; 18	VAL; 3; 33†	MUG; 1; 17	MUG; 2 Ret	MUG; 3; 15	LEC; 1; 13	LEC; 2; 19	LEC; 3; 29	CAT; 1; 6	CAT; 2 Ret	CAT; 3 Ret	MNZ; 1; 9	MNZ; 2; 25	MNZ; 3; 29					20th	10
2025	US Racing	MIS1; 1	MIS1; 2; 7	MIS1; 3; 5	MIS1; 4; 7	VLL; 1 Ret	VLL; 2; 18	VLL; 3	VLL; 4; 31	MNZ; 1; 8	MNZ; 2; 32†	MNZ; 3 Ret	MUG; 1; 10	MUG; 2; 9	MUG; 3; 15	IMO; 1; 21	IMO; 2 C	IMO; 3; 8	CAT; 1; 9	CAT; 2; 17	CAT; 3 C	MIS2; 1	MIS2; 2; 11	MIS2; 3 Ret	MIS2; 4; 14	MIS2; 5; 29†	16th	35

=== Complete Formula Winter Series results ===
(key) (Races in bold indicate pole position; races in italics indicate fastest lap)

Year	Team	1	2	3	4	5	6	7	8	9	10	11	12	DC	Points
2024	US Racing	JER; 1; 37	JER; 2; 12	JER; 3; 18	CRT; 1; 16	CRT; 2; 24	CRT; 3; 8	ARA; 1; 33	ARA; 2; 5	ARA; 3 DSQ	BAR; 1 C	BAR; 2; 29	BAR; 3; 5	14th	25
2025	US Racing	POR; 1 Ret	POR; 2 DNS	POR; 3; 8	CRT; 1; 4	CRT; 2; 4	CRT; 3; 4	ARA; 1; 1	ARA; 2; 2	**ARA**; **3**; 5	CAT; 1; 3	CAT; 2 Ret	CAT; 3; 1	4th	138

=== Complete Euro 4/E4 Championship results ===
(key) (Races in bold indicate pole position; races in italics indicate fastest lap)

Year	Team	1	2	3	4	5	6	7	8	9	DC	Points
2024	US Racing	MUG; 1 Ret	MUG; 2; 14	MUG; 3 Ret	RBR; 1; 22	RBR; 2; 27	RBR; 3; 15	MNZ; 1; 8	MNZ; 2; 18	MNZ; 3; 13	18th	4
2025	US Racing	LEC; 1; 4	LEC; 2; 5	LEC; 3; 21	MUG; 1; 30†	MUG; 2; 6	MUG; 3; 12	MNZ; 1; 3	MNZ; 2; 6	MNZ; 3; 3	6th	68

=== Complete Formula Trophy UAE results ===
(key) (Races in bold indicate pole position; races in italics indicate fastest lap)

Year	Team	1	2	3	4	5	6	7	DC	Points
2024	Xcel Motorsport	DUB; 1; 6	DUB; 2; 1	DUB; 3; 11	YMC1; 1; 8	YMC1; 2; 4	YMC2; 1; 7	YMC2; 2; 1	3rd	80

=== Complete GB3 Championship results ===
(key) (Races in bold indicate pole position) (Races in italics indicate fastest lap)

Year	Team	1	2	3	4	5	6	7	8	9	10	11	12	13	14	15	16	17	18	19	20	21	22	23	24	DC	Points
2025	Xcel Motorsport	SIL1; 1	SIL1; 2	SIL1; 3	ZAN; 1	ZAN; 2	ZAN; 3	SPA; 1	SPA; 2	SPA; 3	HUN; 1	HUN; 2	HUN; 3	SIL2; 1	SIL2; 2	SIL2; 3	BRH; 1	BRH; 2	BRH; 3	DON; 1; 17	DON; 2; 14	DON; 3; 13	MNZ; 1; 13	MNZ; 2; 8	MNZ; 3; 13	27th	38

=== Complete Formula Regional Middle East Trophy results ===
(key) (Races in bold indicate pole position) (Races in italics indicate fastest lap)

Year	Entrant	1	2	3	4	5	6	7	8	9	10	11	12	DC	Points
2026	ART Grand Prix	YMC1; 1; 22	YMC1; 2; 14	YMC1; 3; 4	YMC2; 1; 6	YMC2; 2; 5	YMC2; 3; 5	DUB; 1; 16	DUB; 2; 9	DUB; 3; 20	LUS; 1; 5	LUS; 2 C	LUS; 3; 4	9th	62

=== Complete Formula Regional European Championship results ===
(key) (Races in bold indicate pole position) (Races in italics indicate fastest lap)

Year	Team	1	2	3	4	5	6	7	8	9	10	11	12	13	14	15	16	17	18	19	20	DC	Points
2026	ART Grand Prix	RBR; 1; 16	RBR; 2; 16	RBR; 3; 18	ZAN; 1; 26	ZAN; 2; 18	SPA; 1; 21	SPA; 2 C	SPA; 3; 25	MNZ; 1; 20	MNZ; 2; 8	MNZ; 3; 25†	HUN; 1; 9	HUN; 2; 12	LEC; 1; 12	LEC; 2; 10	IMO; 1; 6	IMO; 2; 5	IMO; 3; 20	HOC; 1; 20	HOC; 2; 10	21st	21

=== Complete Eurocup-3 results ===
(key) (Races in bold indicate pole position; races in italics indicate fastest lap)

Year	Team	1	2	3	4	5	6	7	8	9	10	11	12	13	14	15	16	17	18	19	Pos	Points
2026	Griffin Core	LEC; 1	LEC; SR	LEC; 2	POR; 1	POR; 2	IMO; 1	IMO; SR	IMO; 2	MNZ; 1	MNZ; 2	SIL; 1	SIL; 2	JER; 1	JER; SPR	JER; 2	HUN; 1; 12	HUN; 2; 15	CAT; 1	CAT; 2	NC†	0

^{†} As Anurag was a guest driver, he was ineligible to score points.

=== Complete Macau Grand Prix results ===
Year	Team	Car	Qualifying	Quali Race	Main Race
2026	(Italy) RPM	Tatuus T-326	TBD	TBD	TBD
