= Panzeri =

Panzeri is an Italian surname. Notable people with the surname include:

- Antonio Panzeri (born 1955), Italian politician
- Emanuele Panzeri (born 1993), Italian footballer
- Ginevra Panzeri (born 2008), Italian racing driver
- Mario Panzeri (1911–1991), Italian lyricist and composer

== See also ==
- Panziera
