= 2023 Italian F4 Championship =

Motorsport event

The 2023 Italian F4 Championship Powered by Abarth was the tenth season of the Italian F4 Championship.

== Teams and drivers ==
Team	No.	Driver	Class	Rounds
(Italy) Prema Racing	3	(United States) Ugo Ugochukwu		All
(Italy) Prema Racing	8	(Finland) Tuukka Taponen	R	All
(Italy) Prema Racing	13	(Australia) James Wharton		All
(Italy) Prema Racing	14	(United Arab Emirates) Rashid Al Dhaheri	R	All
(Italy) Prema Racing	16	(Brazil) Aurelia Nobels (Note: Nobels is a Belgian-Brazilian driver competing under a Brazilian licence.)	W	1–2, 4–7
(Italy) Prema Racing	23	(United Kingdom) Arvid Lindblad	R	All
(Italy) Prema Racing	47	(Italy) Nicola Lacorte	R	All
(Italy) Prema Racing	51	(Philippines) Bianca Bustamante	W	3
(Italy) Prema Racing	80	(Jamaica) Alex Powell	R	6–7
(Netherlands) Van Amersfoort Racing	4	(France) Pablo Sarrazin		5
(Netherlands) Van Amersfoort Racing	7	(Brazil) Matheus Ferreira	R	All
(Netherlands) Van Amersfoort Racing	11	(Uzbekistan) Ismoilkhuja Akhmedkhodjaev		1–5
(Netherlands) Van Amersfoort Racing	15	(Italy) Brando Badoer		All
(Netherlands) Van Amersfoort Racing	17	(Portugal) Ivan Domingues		1–6
(Netherlands) Van Amersfoort Racing	45	(Australia) Jack Beeton	R	All
(Netherlands) Van Amersfoort Racing	77	(United Kingdom) Freddie Slater	R	6–7
(Germany) PHM Racing	5	(Italy) Davide Larini	R	6–7
(Germany) PHM Racing	10	(Germany) Valentin Kluss		1–5
(Germany) PHM Racing	48	(Italy) James Egozi (Note: Egozi is an American driver competing under an Italian licence.)	R	All
(Germany) PHM Racing	53	(Italy) Giacomo Pedrini	R	6–7
(Germany) PHM Racing	57	(Thailand) Nandhavud Bhirombhakdi		1–6
(Germany) PHM Racing	78	(Italy) Victoria Blokhina (Note: Blokhina is Russian, but she competes under an Italian licence as Russian national emblems were banned by the FIA following the Russian invasion of Ukraine.)	W	All
(Germany) PHM Racing	81	(Germany) Tom Kalender	R	7
(San Marino) AKM Motorsport	5	(Italy) Davide Larini	R	1–4
(San Marino) AKM Motorsport	6	(Australia) Kamal Mrad		7
(San Marino) AKM Motorsport	21	(Switzerland) Tina Hausmann	R W	All
(San Marino) AKM Motorsport	22	(France) Enzo Deligny (Note: Deligny is a French-Chinese driver competing under a Spanish licence in the first round and under a French licence in the fifth round.)	R	1, 5
(San Marino) AKM Motorsport	86	(Mexico) Diego de la Torre		4–7
(San Marino) AKM Motorsport	87	(Costa Rica) Frederik Lund (Note: Lund is a Danish-Nicaraguan driver competing under a Costa Rican licence.)		2–6
(San Marino) AKM Motorsport	88	(Australia) Griffin Peebles (Note: Peebles is an Australian driver who competed under an Italian licence in the first round.)	R	1
(Italy) BVM Racing	9	(Italy) Alfio Spina		All
(Italy) BVM Racing	18	(Italy) Andrea Frassineti		1–2, 4
(Italy) BVM Racing	19	(Mexico) Jesse Carrasquedo Jr.		1
(Italy) BVM Racing	72	(Italy) Alvise Rodella	R	5
(Germany) US Racing	12	(Australia) Gianmarco Pradel	R	All
(Germany) US Racing	20	(Malta) Zachary David	R	All
(Germany) US Racing	31	(United Kingdom) Akshay Bohra (Note: Bohra is an American-Indian driver competing under a British licence.)	R	All
(Germany) US Racing	37	(Poland) Kacper Sztuka		All
(Germany) US Racing	66	(China) Ruiqi Liu	R	All
(Germany) US Racing	94	(Singapore) Kabir Anurag	R	6–7
(Switzerland) Jenzer Motorsport	24	(China) Shimo Zhang	R	7
(Switzerland) Jenzer Motorsport	26	(South Korea) Hwarang Kim		1–3, 5–6
(Switzerland) Jenzer Motorsport	27	(Switzerland) Ethan Ischer		All
(Switzerland) Jenzer Motorsport	29	(Israel) Ariel Elkin	R	All
(Switzerland) Jenzer Motorsport	61	(Germany) Finn Wiebelhaus	R	4, 7
(Switzerland) Jenzer Motorsport	88	(Australia) Griffin Peebles	R	5
(Switzerland) Maffi Racing	55	(Venezuela) Gabriel Holguin	R	5
(Slovenia) AS Motorsport	61	(Germany) Finn Wiebelhaus	R	1
(Slovenia) AS Motorsport	62	(Italy) Manuel Quondamcarlo	R	1–2
(Italy) Airflow Racing	63	(Italy) Guido Luchetti	R	All
(France) R-ace GP	76	(France) Raphaël Narac	R (Note: Narac was not registered as a rookie until Round 5.)	All
(France) R-ace GP	85	(Italy) Matteo De Palo	R	1
(France) R-ace GP	93	(United Arab Emirates) Matteo Quintarelli (Note: Quintarelli is an Italian-Emirati driver competing under an Emirati licence.)	R	All
(France) R-ace GP	94	(Singapore) Kabir Anurag	R	5

Icon	Legend
R	Rookie
W	Woman Trophy

- Aurelia Nobels was initially confirmed to be racing for Iron Dames, but was later placed in its sister team Prema Racing.

== Race calendar and results ==
The calendar was revealed on 24 October 2022. The four race format was used when the number of the entrants exceeded the circuit's capacity.

Round		Circuit	Date	Pole position	Fastest lap	Winning driver	Winning team	Secondary class winner	Supporting
1	R1	(Italy) Imola Circuit	22 April	(Poland) Kacper Sztuka	(Italy) Brando Badoer	(Poland) Kacper Sztuka	(Germany) US Racing	R: (Italy) Nicola Lacorte; W: (Switzerland) Tina Hausmann	Formula Regional European Championship; TCR Italy Touring Car Championship; Italian Prototype Championship; Drexler-Automotive Formula Cup; F2000 Italian Formula Trophy
1	R2	(Italy) Imola Circuit	22 April	(United States) Ugo Ugochukwu	(United States) Ugo Ugochukwu	(United States) Ugo Ugochukwu	(Italy) Prema Racing	R: (United Kingdom) Arvid Lindblad; W: (Brazil) Aurelia Nobels	Formula Regional European Championship; TCR Italy Touring Car Championship; Italian Prototype Championship; Drexler-Automotive Formula Cup; F2000 Italian Formula Trophy
1	R3	(Italy) Imola Circuit	23 April	(United States) Ugo Ugochukwu	(Australia) James Wharton	(Italy) Nicola Lacorte	(Italy) Prema Racing	R: (Italy) Nicola Lacorte; W: no participants	Formula Regional European Championship; TCR Italy Touring Car Championship; Italian Prototype Championship; Drexler-Automotive Formula Cup; F2000 Italian Formula Trophy
1	R4	(Italy) Imola Circuit	23 April	(Italy) Nicola Lacorte	(Italy) Brando Badoer	(United Kingdom) Arvid Lindblad	(Italy) Prema Racing	R: (United Kingdom) Arvid Lindblad; W: (Brazil) Aurelia Nobels	Formula Regional European Championship; TCR Italy Touring Car Championship; Italian Prototype Championship; Drexler-Automotive Formula Cup; F2000 Italian Formula Trophy
2	R1	(Italy) Misano World Circuit	6 May	(Finland) Tuukka Taponen	(Poland) Kacper Sztuka	(Finland) Tuukka Taponen	(Italy) Prema Racing	R: (Finland) Tuukka Taponen; W: (Italy) Victoria Blokhina	Italian GT Championship; TCR Italy Touring Car Championship; Porsche Carrera Cup Italy
2	R2	(Italy) Misano World Circuit	6 May	(United Kingdom) Arvid Lindblad	(United Kingdom) Arvid Lindblad	(United Kingdom) Arvid Lindblad	(Italy) Prema Racing	R: (United Kingdom) Arvid Lindblad; W: (Italy) Victoria Blokhina	Italian GT Championship; TCR Italy Touring Car Championship; Porsche Carrera Cup Italy
2	R3	(Italy) Misano World Circuit	7 May	(United Kingdom) Arvid Lindblad	(Malta) Zachary David	(United Kingdom) Arvid Lindblad	(Italy) Prema Racing	R: (United Kingdom) Arvid Lindblad; W: (Italy) Victoria Blokhina	Italian GT Championship; TCR Italy Touring Car Championship; Porsche Carrera Cup Italy
3	R1	(Belgium) Circuit de Spa-Francorchamps	27 May	(Australia) James Wharton	(United Kingdom) Arvid Lindblad	(Australia) James Wharton	(Italy) Prema Racing	R: (Malta) Zachary David; W: (Switzerland) Tina Hausmann	International GT Open; Euroformula Open; GT Cup Open Europe; TCR World Tour; TCR Europe Touring Car Series
3	R2	(Belgium) Circuit de Spa-Francorchamps	28 May	(Australia) James Wharton	(Australia) James Wharton	(Australia) James Wharton	(Italy) Prema Racing	R: (United Kingdom) Arvid Lindblad; W: (Philippines) Bianca Bustamante	International GT Open; Euroformula Open; GT Cup Open Europe; TCR World Tour; TCR Europe Touring Car Series
3	R3	(Belgium) Circuit de Spa-Francorchamps	28 May	(Poland) Kacper Sztuka	(Malta) Zachary David	(United States) Ugo Ugochukwu	(Italy) Prema Racing	R: (Malta) Zachary David; W: (Philippines) Bianca Bustamante	International GT Open; Euroformula Open; GT Cup Open Europe; TCR World Tour; TCR Europe Touring Car Series
4	R1	(Italy) Monza Circuit	24 June	(Italy) Brando Badoer	(United States) Ugo Ugochukwu	(United Kingdom) Arvid Lindblad (Note: Ugochukwu finished first but received multiple time penalties for overtakes over the track limits and dangerous behavior on the track. Lindblad inherited the win.)	(Italy) Prema Racing	R: (United Kingdom) Arvid Lindblad; W: (Switzerland) Tina Hausmann	Italian GT Championship; Italian Prototype Championship
4	R2	(Italy) Monza Circuit	25 June	(United Kingdom) Arvid Lindblad	(United States) Ugo Ugochukwu	(United Kingdom) Arvid Lindblad	(Italy) Prema Racing	R: (United Kingdom) Arvid Lindblad; W: (Italy) Victoria Blokhina	Italian GT Championship; Italian Prototype Championship
4	R3	(Italy) Monza Circuit	25 June	(United Kingdom) Arvid Lindblad	(United Kingdom) Arvid Lindblad	(United Kingdom) Arvid Lindblad	(Italy) Prema Racing	R: (United Kingdom) Arvid Lindblad; W: (Brazil) Aurelia Nobels	Italian GT Championship; Italian Prototype Championship
5	R1	(France) Circuit Paul Ricard	22 July	(United States) Ugo Ugochukwu	(Poland) Kacper Sztuka	(Poland) Kacper Sztuka	(Germany) US Racing	R: (Finland) Tuukka Taponen; W: (Brazil) Aurelia Nobels	International GT Open; Euroformula Open; GT Cup Open Europe; Formula Regional European Championship; TCR Europe Touring Car Series
5	R2	(France) Circuit Paul Ricard	23 July	(Poland) Kacper Sztuka	(United States) Ugo Ugochukwu	(Poland) Kacper Sztuka	(Germany) US Racing	R: (Finland) Tuukka Taponen; W: (Switzerland) Tina Hausmann	International GT Open; Euroformula Open; GT Cup Open Europe; Formula Regional European Championship; TCR Europe Touring Car Series
5	R3	(France) Circuit Paul Ricard	23 July	(Australia) James Wharton	(Poland) Kacper Sztuka	(Poland) Kacper Sztuka	(Germany) US Racing	R: (Finland) Tuukka Taponen; W: (Brazil) Aurelia Nobels	International GT Open; Euroformula Open; GT Cup Open Europe; Formula Regional European Championship; TCR Europe Touring Car Series
6	R1	(Italy) Mugello Circuit	30 September	(Poland) Kacper Sztuka	(Poland) Kacper Sztuka	(Poland) Kacper Sztuka	(Germany) US Racing	R: (Australia) Gianmarco Pradel; W: (Switzerland) Tina Hausmann	Italian GT Championship; Italian Prototype Championship; Euroformula Open Championship
6	R2	(Italy) Mugello Circuit	1 October	(Poland) Kacper Sztuka	(Poland) Kacper Sztuka	(Poland) Kacper Sztuka	(Germany) US Racing	R: (United Kingdom) Akshay Bohra; W: (Switzerland) Tina Hausmann	Italian GT Championship; Italian Prototype Championship; Euroformula Open Championship
6	R3	(Italy) Mugello Circuit	1 October	(Poland) Kacper Sztuka	(Poland) Kacper Sztuka	(Poland) Kacper Sztuka	(Germany) US Racing	R: (United Kingdom) Akshay Bohra; W: (Switzerland) Tina Hausmann	Italian GT Championship; Italian Prototype Championship; Euroformula Open Championship
7	R1	(Italy) Vallelunga Circuit	14 October	(Poland) Kacper Sztuka	(Italy) Brando Badoer	(United States) Ugo Ugochukwu	(Italy) Prema Racing	R: (Finland) Tuukka Taponen; W: (Brazil) Aurelia Nobels	Italian GT Championship; TCR Italy Touring Car Championship; Italian Prototype Championship
7	R2	(Italy) Vallelunga Circuit	14 October	(Poland) Kacper Sztuka	(Poland) Kacper Sztuka	(Poland) Kacper Sztuka	(Germany) US Racing	R: (Finland) Tuukka Taponen; W: (Brazil) Aurelia Nobels	Italian GT Championship; TCR Italy Touring Car Championship; Italian Prototype Championship
7	R3	(Italy) Vallelunga Circuit	15 October	(Poland) Kacper Sztuka	(Poland) Kacper Sztuka	(Poland) Kacper Sztuka	(Germany) US Racing	R: (Finland) Tuukka Taponen; W: (Brazil) Aurelia Nobels	Italian GT Championship; TCR Italy Touring Car Championship; Italian Prototype Championship

== Championship standings ==
Points were awarded to the top 10 classified finishers in each race. No points were awarded for pole position or fastest lap. The final classifications for the individual standings was obtained by summing up the scores on the 16 best results obtained during the races held.

Position	**1st**	**2nd**	**3rd**	**4th**	**5th**	**6th**	**7th**	**8th**	**9th**	**10th**
Points	25	18	15	12	10	8	6	4	2	1

=== Drivers' championship ===
Pos	Driver	IMO (Italy)				MIS (Italy)			SPA (Belgium)			MNZ (Italy)			LEC (France)			MUG (Italy)			VLL (Italy)			Pts
Pos	Driver	R1	R2	R3	R4	R1	R2	R3	R1	R2 (Note: Half points were awarded as less than 75% of the race distance was completed.)	R3	R1	R2	R3	R1	R2	R3	R1	R2	R3	R1	R2	R3	Pts
1	(Poland) Kacper Sztuka	**1**	Ret		Ret	4	Ret	4	6	2	**24**	4	4	2	1	**1**	1	**1**	**1**	**1**	**3**	**1**	**1**	315
2	(United States) Ugo Ugochukwu		**1**	**Ret**	3	6	3	2	4	7	1	25	2	8	**2**	3	5	2	2	2	1	4	2	280
3	(United Kingdom) Arvid Lindblad		2	2	1	2	**1**	**1**	5	3	Ret	1	**1**	**1**	8	4	6	5	31†	10	6	9	14	263.5
4	(Australia) James Wharton	23†		5	12	3	2	28	**1**	**1**	3	6	5	5	3	Ret	**2**	8	9	3	5	6	4	205.5
5	(Finland) Tuukka Taponen	9	9		28†	**1**	4	5	7	18	7	3	27†	17	4	2	3	15	4	5	2	2	3	196
6	(Italy) Brando Badoer	2		4	27†	5	8	Ret	3	Ret	4	**2**	3	Ret	7	Ret	4	7	32†	6	8	3	5	165
7	(Malta) Zachary David	6	3		5	Ret	6	3	2	6	2	26†	11	6	34†	5	14	Ret	8	7	4	23	6	144
8	(United Kingdom) Akshay Bohra	4	19		7	Ret	7	10	8	4	6	7	26†	3	Ret	6	12	6	3	4	Ret	Ret	7	113
9	(Italy) Nicola Lacorte	3		1	**4**	8	11	8	16	13	8	11	7	9	32	12	15	29†	10	17	9	24	12	75
10	(United Arab Emirates) Rashid Al Dhaheri	7	7		30†	7	DNS	6	9	8	Ret	29†	10	4	11	9	25	4	5	26	17	10	21	68
11	(Portugal) Ivan Domingues		4	3	24	23	5	7	20	11	DNS	16	Ret	29†	6	30	23	10	19	8				56
12	(Italy) Alfio Spina	5	5		2	11	9	9	12	21	11	5	12	Ret	10	11	11	13	20	Ret	20	13	28	53
13	(Australia) Gianmarco Pradel		Ret	11	9	9	10	12	29	9	20	9	8	7	9	10	18	3	7	15	11	16	22	42
14	(Italy) James Egozi	8		9	11	12	12	11	14	12	9	8	Ret	20	5	7	Ret	12	17	11	10	7	9	37
15	(Germany) Valentin Kluss		6	6	6	10	18	17	11	14	10	27†	6	12	16	14	Ret							34
16	(United Kingdom) Freddie Slater																	9	6	27†	15	5	8	24
17	(Israel) Ariel Elkin	11		Ret	13	20	14	Ret	13	10	Ret	13	9	Ret	15	21	8	14	15	12	7	8	15	16.5
18	(Brazil) Matheus Ferreira		12	DSQ	Ret	26†	Ret	14	10	Ret	5	10	13	15	20	19	10	11	11	9	12	12	Ret	15
19	(France) Raphaël Narac	13		15	18	Ret	25†	19	26	5	15	14	Ret	11	Ret	25	7	16	12	28†	16	11	31	11
20	(Italy) Matteo De Palo	24†		7	8																			10
21	(Thailand) Nandhavud Bhirombhakdi		18	8	29†	13	16	18	19	25	12	12	15	28	13	8	13	Ret	16	Ret				8
22	(France) Enzo Deligny	10	8		10										18	13	9							8
23	(Australia) Jack Beeton		13	10	26	17	17	Ret	28	DSQ	EX	18	16	10	17	Ret	32†	21	14	14	13	Ret	11	2
24	(Jamaica) Alex Powell																	28	18	Ret	14	22	10	1
25	(Mexico) Jesse Carrasquedo Jr.		10	14	Ret																			1
26	(Brazil) Aurelia Nobels	21	11		17	27†	DNS	WD				21	Ret	18	14	Ret	19	22	Ret	22	22	17	24	0
27	(South Korea) Hwarang Kim	12		12	31†	25†	20	21	22	17	18				23	20	17	20	25	18				0
28	(France) Pablo Sarrazin														12	23	33†							0
29	(Switzerland) Ethan Ischer	20		18	14	22	13	16	17	16	14	15	14	13	24	15	21	17	13	19	23	19	19	0
30	(China) Ruiqi Liu	18		Ret	Ret	28†	15	13	15	23	13	28†	18	14	19	Ret	26	18	21	13	32	14	20	0
31	(United Arab Emirates) Matteo Quintarelli		16	13	15	19	24	22	21	15	25	Ret	23	16	22	Ret	31	Ret	Ret	16	19	Ret	13	0
32	(Italy) Davide Larini		17	17	25	14	Ret	15	18	20	17	WD	WD	WD				26	26	29	18	15	16	0
33	(Australia) Griffin Peebles	14		16	20										33	24	16							0
34	(Italy) Andrea Frassineti		14	Ret	WD	21	19	27				17	28†	19										0
35	(Italy) Victoria Blokhina	22	15		19	15	21	26	Ret	WD	WD	24	20	21	25	22	22	25	28	23	28	20	33	0
36	(Germany) Finn Wiebelhaus	15		19	16							19	19	23							29	Ret	17	0
37	(Costa Rica) Frederik Lund					Ret	Ret	24	23	22	16	Ret	17	25	Ret	18	Ret	23	23	Ret				0
38	(Italy) Manuel Quondamcarlo	17	21		21	16	22	20																0
39	(Uzbekistan) Ismoilkhuja Akhmedkhodjaev	16	22		22	18	Ret	25	27	24	22	23	25	24	29	27	28							0
40	(Switzerland) Tina Hausmann	19	20		Ret	Ret	WD	WD	24	Ret	23	20	21	22	27	16	20	19	27	20	25	Ret	25	0
41	(Singapore) Kabir Anurag														26	17	Ret	Ret	24	Ret	26	Ret	26	0
42	(Italy) Giacomo Pedrini																	Ret	22	21	24	18	30	0
43	(China) Shimo Zhang																				21	Ret	18	0
44	(Philippines) Bianca Bustamante								25	19	19													0
45	(Italy) Guido Luchetti		23	20	23	24	23	23	Ret	Ret	21	Ret	24	27	30	26	27	27	29	24	31	Ret	29	0
46	(Italy) Alvise Rodella														21	Ret	24							0
47	(Australia) Kamal Mrad																				33	21	32	0
48	(Mexico) Diego de la Torre											22	22	26	28	28	29	24	30	25	30	Ret	27	0
49	(Germany) Tom Kalender																				27	Ret	23	0
50	(Venezuela) Gabriel Holguin														31	29	30							0
Pos	Driver	R1	R2	R3	R4	R1	R2	R3	R1	R2	R3	R1	R2	R3	R1	R2	R3	R1	R2	R3	R1	R2	R3	Pts
Pos	Driver	IMO (Italy)				MIS (Italy)			SPA (Belgium)			MNZ (Italy)			LEC (France)			MUG (Italy)			VLL (Italy)			Pts

Colour	Result
Gold	Winner
Silver	Second place
Bronze	Third place
Green	Points classification
Blue	Non-points classification
Blue	Non-classified finish (NC)
Purple	Retired, not classified (Ret)
Red	Did not qualify (DNQ)
Red	Did not pre-qualify (DNPQ)
Black	Disqualified (DSQ)
White	Did not start (DNS)
White	Withdrew (WD)
White	Race cancelled (C)
Blank	Did not practice (DNP)
Blank	Did not arrive (DNA)
Blank	Excluded (EX)

**Bold** – Pole
Italics – Fastest Lap
† — Did not finish, but classified

=== Secondary classes standings ===
Pos	Driver	IMO (Italy)				MIS (Italy)			SPA (Belgium)			MNZ (Italy)			LEC (France)			MUG (Italy)			VLL (Italy)			Pts
Pos	Driver	R1	R2	R3	R4	R1	R2	R3	R1	R2	R3	R1	R2	R3	R1	R2	R3	R1	R2	R3	R1	R2	R3	Pts
Rookies' championship
1	(United Kingdom) Arvid Lindblad		1	2	1	2	1	1	2	1	Ret	1	1	1	3	2	2	3	20†	5	3	5	10	322.5
2	(Finland) Tuukka Taponen	6	5		17†	1	2	3	3	10	4	2	15†	11	1	1	1	9	2	2	1	1	1	307
3	(Malta) Zachary David	3	2		3	Ret	3	2	1	3	1	12†	6	4	19†	3	8	Ret	6	3	2	14	2	236.5
4	(United Kingdom) Akshay Bohra	2	10		4	Ret	4	6	4	2	3	3	14†	2	Ret	4	7	4	1	1	Ret	Ret	3	215
5	(Italy) Nicola Lacorte	1		1	2	4	6	5	10	8	5	7	2	6	17	8	9	17†	7	12	5	15	8	169
6	(United Arab Emirates) Rashid Al Dhaheri	4	3		18†	3	DNS	4	5	4	Ret	14†	5	3	5	6	14	2	3	16	13	6	16	154
7	(Italy) James Egozi	5		4	8	6	7	7	8	7	6	4	Ret	12	2	5	Ret	7	12	6	6	3	5	148
8	(Australia) Gianmarco Pradel		Ret	6	6	5	5	8	15	5	9	5	3	5	4	7	11	1	5	10	7	11	17	142
9	(Brazil) Matheus Ferreira		6	DSQ	Ret	13†	Ret	10	6	Ret	2	6	7	9	10	12	6	6	8	4	8	8	Ret	92
10	(Israel) Ariel Elkin	8		Ret	9	11	8	Ret	7	6	Ret	8	4	Ret	6	13	4	8	11	7	4	4	11	90
11	(United Kingdom) Freddie Slater																	5	4	17†	11	2	4	52
12	(Australia) Jack Beeton		7	5	16	9	10	Ret	12	DSQ	EX	9	8	7	7	Ret	19†	13	10	9	9	Ret	7	48
13	(France) Enzo Deligny	7	4		7										8	9	5							40
14	(China) Ruiqi Liu	12		Ret	Ret	14†	9	9	9	12	7	13†	9	8	9	Ret	15	11	14	8	23	9	15	26
15	(Italy) Matteo De Palo	14†		3	5																			25
16	(France) Raphaël Narac														Ret	15	3	10	9	18†	12	7	23	24
17	(United Arab Emirates) Matteo Quintarelli		8	7	10	10	13	13	13	9	11	Ret	12	10	12	Ret	18	Ret	Ret	11	15	Ret	9	16
18	(Italy) Davide Larini		9	9	15	7	Ret	11	11	11	8	WD	WD	WD				14	17	19	14	10	12	15
19	(Jamaica) Alex Powell																	16	13	Ret	10	13	6	9
20	(Australia) Griffin Peebles	9		8	12										18	14	10							7
21	(Italy) Manuel Quondamcarlo	11	12		13	8	11	12																4
22	(Germany) Finn Wiebelhaus	10		10	11							10	10	14							21	Ret	13	4
23	(Switzerland) Tina Hausmann	13	11		Ret	Ret	WD	WD	14	Ret	12	11	11	13	14	10	12	12	18	13	18	Ret	19	1
24	(Italy) Guido Luchetti		13	11	14	12	12	14	Ret	Ret	10	Ret	13	15	15	16	16	15	19	15	22	Ret	21	1
25	(Singapore) Kabir Anurag														13	11	Ret	Ret	16	Ret	19	Ret	20	0
26	(Italy) Alvise Rodella														11	Ret	13							0
27	(Italy) Giacomo Pedrini																	Ret	15	14	17	12	22	0
28	(China) Shimo Zhang																				16	Ret	14	0
29	(Venezuela) Gabriel Holguin														16	17	17							0
30	(Germany) Tom Kalender																				20	Ret	18	0
Women's championship
1	(Switzerland) Tina Hausmann	1	3		Ret	Ret	WD	WD	1	Ret	2	1	2	3	3	1	2	1	1	1	2	Ret	2	310
2	(Italy) Victoria Blokhina	3	2		2	1	1	1	Ret	WD	WD	3	1	2	2	2	3	3	2	3	3	2	3	301
3	(Brazil) Aurelia Nobels	2	1		1	2†	DNS	WD				2	Ret	1	1	Ret	1	2	Ret	2	1	1	1	290
4	(Philippines) Bianca Bustamante								2	1	1													55.5
Pos	Driver	R1	R2	R3	R4	R1	R2	R3	R1	R2	R3	R1	R2	R3	R1	R2	R3	R1	R2	R3	R1	R2	R3	Pts
Pos	Driver	IMO (Italy)				MIS (Italy)			SPA (Belgium)			MNZ (Italy)			LEC (France)			MUG (Italy)			VLL (Italy)			Pts

=== Teams' championship ===
Each team acquired the points earned by their two best drivers in each race.

Pos	Team	IMO (Italy)				MIS (Italy)			SPA (Belgium)			MNZ (Italy)			LEC (France)			MUG (Italy)			VLL (Italy)			Pts
Pos	Team	R1	R2	R3	R4	R1	R2	R3	R1	R2	R3	R1	R2	R3	R1	R2	R3	R1	R2	R3	R1	R2	R3	Pts
1	(Italy) Prema Racing	3	1	1	1	1	1	1	1	1	1	1	1	1	2	2	2	2	2	2	1	2	2	791
1	(Italy) Prema Racing	7	2	2	3	2	2	2	4	3	3	3	2	4	3	3	3	4	4	3	2	4	3	791
2	(Germany) US Racing	1	3	11	5	4	6	3	2	2	2	4	4	2	1	1	1	1	1	1	3	1	1	546
2	(Germany) US Racing	4	19	Ret	7	9	7	4	6	4	6	7	8	3	9	5	12	3	3	4	4	14	6	546
3	(Netherlands) Van Amersfoort Racing	2	4	3	22	5	5	7	3	11	4	2	3	10	6	19	4	7	6	6	8	3	5	258
3	(Netherlands) Van Amersfoort Racing	16	12	4	24	17	8	14	10	24	5	10	13	15	7	23	10	9	11	8	12	5	8	258
4	(Germany) PHM Racing	8	6	6	6	10	12	11	11	12	9	8	6	12	5	7	13	12	16	11	10	7	9	77
4	(Germany) PHM Racing	22	15	8	11	12	16	17	14	14	10	12	15	20	13	8	22	25	17	21	18	15	16	77
5	(Italy) BVM Racing	5	5	14	2	11	9	9	12	21	11	5	12	19	10	11	11	13	20	Ret	20	13	28	54
5	(Italy) BVM Racing		10	Ret	Ret	21	19	27				17	28†	Ret	21	Ret	24							54
6	(France) R-ace GP	13	16	7	8	19	24	19	21	5	15	14	23	11	22	17	7	16	12	16	16	11	13	21
6	(France) R-ace GP	24†		13	15	Ret	25†	22	26	15	25	Ret	Ret	16	26	25	31	Ret	Ret	29†	19	Ret	31	21
7	(Switzerland) Jenzer Motorsport	11		12	13	20	13	16	13	10	14	13	9	13	15	15	8	14	13	12	7	8	15	16.5
7	(Switzerland) Jenzer Motorsport	12		18	14	22	14	21	17	16	18	15	14	23	23	20	16	17	15	18	21	19	17	16.5
8	(San Marino) AKM Motorsport	10	8	16	10	14	Ret	15	18	20	16	20	17	22	18	13	9	19	23	20	25	21	25	8
8	(San Marino) AKM Motorsport	14	17	17	20	Ret	Ret	24	23	22	17	22	21	25	27	16	20	23	27	25	30	Ret	27	8
9	(Slovenia) AS Motorsport	15	21	19	16	16	22	20																0
9	(Slovenia) AS Motorsport	17			21																			0
10	(Italy) Airflow Racing		22	20	23	24	23	23	Ret	Ret	21	Ret	24	27	30	26	27	27	29	24	31	Ret	29	0
11	(Switzerland) Maffi Racing														31	29	30							0
Pos	Team	R1	R2	R3	R4	R1	R2	R3	R1	R2	R3	R1	R2	R3	R1	R2	R3	R1	R2	R3	R1	R2	R3	Pts
Pos	Team	IMO (Italy)				MIS (Italy)			SPA (Belgium)			MNZ (Italy)			LEC (France)			MUG (Italy)			VLL (Italy)			Pts

Colour	Result
Gold	Winner
Silver	Second place
Bronze	Third place
Green	Points classification
Blue	Non-points classification
Blue	Non-classified finish (NC)
Purple	Retired, not classified (Ret)
Red	Did not qualify (DNQ)
Red	Did not pre-qualify (DNPQ)
Black	Disqualified (DSQ)
White	Did not start (DNS)
White	Withdrew (WD)
White	Race cancelled (C)
Blank	Did not practice (DNP)
Blank	Did not arrive (DNA)
Blank	Excluded (EX)

**Bold** – Pole
Italics – Fastest Lap
† — Did not finish, but classified

== See also ==
- 2023 Euro 4 Championship
