= Crinitus =

Italian humanist (1474–1507)

Pietro Crinito (22 May 1474 – 5 July 1507), known as Crinitus, or Pietro Del Riccio Baldi (derived from riccio, 'curly', translated into Latin as crinitus), was a Florentine humanist scholar and poet who was a disciple of Poliziano.

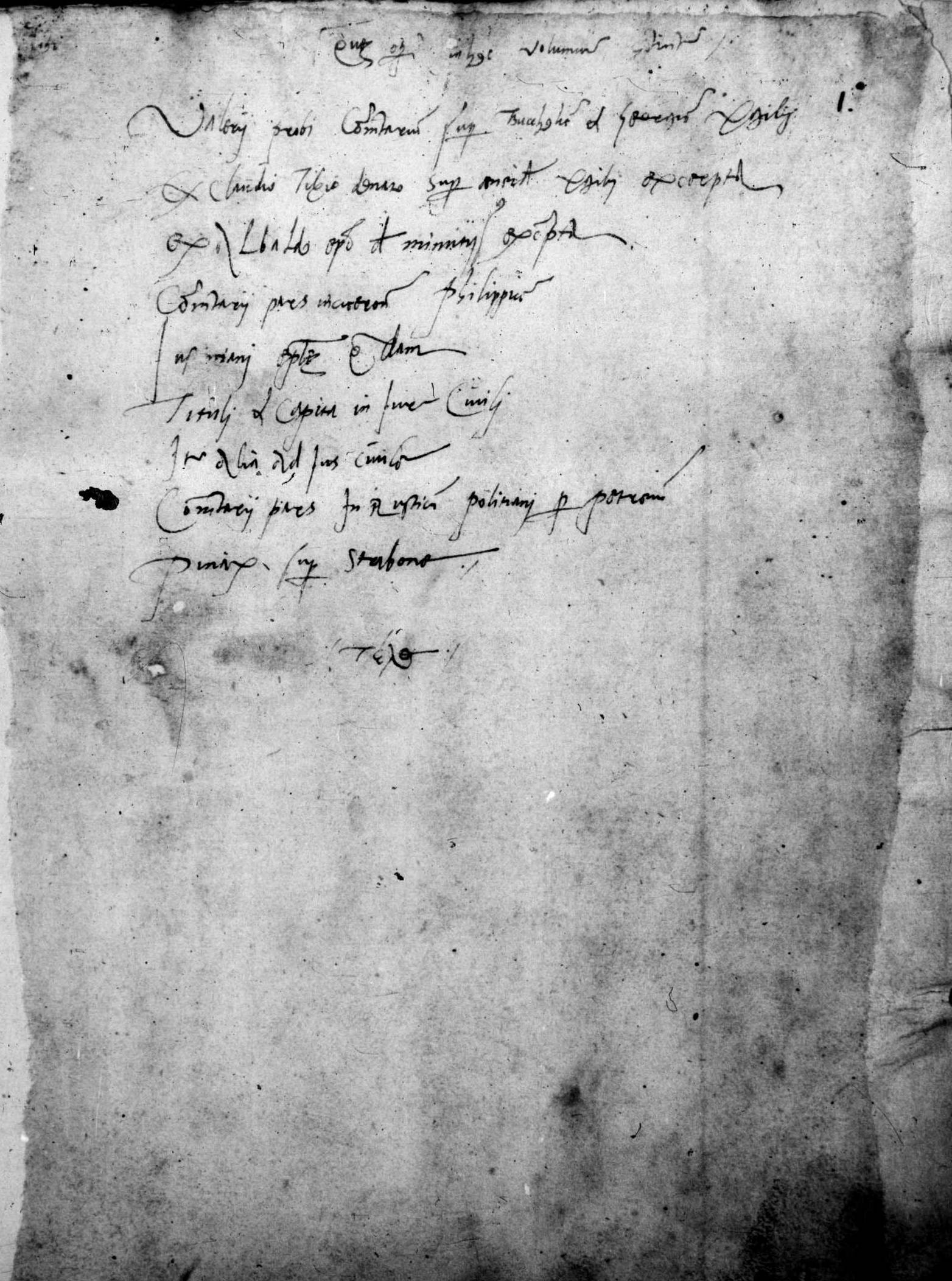
Collatio Litterae Florentinae, 15th-century manuscript. Bayerische Staatsbibliothek, Munich

He is best known for his 1504 commonplace book, De honesta disciplina. This has been taken to be a source for the work of Nostradamus.

== Biography ==
He studied Grammar in Florence i.e. Latin language, with the priest Paolo Sassi da Ronciglione with whom he remained until May 22, 1487 when he went to the school of Ugolino di Vieri. Then in 1491 he joined the circle of Poliziano disciples.

Just following his master's example he also decided to change his Patronymic inherited from his father's thick hair, which he translated Latinically into crinito (curly). From Pietro Baldi del Riccio (that is, “son of the curl”) he became for everyone Pietro Crinito or Petrus Crinitus.

After Poliziano's death, he gave lectures in Santo Spirito, Florence Studio and then began a long series of peregrinations that took him to Bologna, Ferrara, Venice, Padua, Rome and Naples. He finally returned to Florence where, under the patronage of Bernardo Rucellai, he joined the Platonic Academy that met at the Orti Oricellari.

He published in 1504 the Commentarii de honesta disciplina, a mammoth Essay of erudition in 25 books that, along the lines of Aulus Gellius, dealt with Linguistics, Politics, Jurisprudence, and Religion institutions. Despite some brilliant insights, however, the work is confusing and at times obscure, and the author often falls into the ridiculous or fabulous.

The following year De Poetis Latinis in five books came out, which set out in 93 short chapters to encyclopedically catalogue Latin writers from Livius Andronicus to Sidonius Apollinaris, which, while full of inaccuracies, is by far the first modern Biography compilation of classical authors.

Although a learned and committed Renaissance humanism his work, like his life, was not exactly marked by intellectual rigor. Lapidary about him is the judgment of Giovan Battista Corniani:

In Poliziano's school he had learned eloquence and taste, but not modesty, not sobriety of manners. These good and bad qualities combined in him could make him appear a good-looking garzone, an amiable libertine, and therefore his society was eagerly sought after by the brilliant young men of the primary Florentine families. When a learned man keeps gravity in his manners, he will demand the esteem, but not already the intimacy of the great ones of the beautiful world. If he then dilutes his eyebrow and becomes a beautiful spirit, then he will be honored with their domesticity and made a partaker of the vices and frequent orgies of their class. Such was the case with Peter Crinito

He died just 32 years old of Pneumonia after a singular accident:

An intemperate joviality was to him the cause of contumelia and later even of death. Finding himself one evening in Pier Martelli's Scandiana villa at a genial extravaganza, and reveling in the guests with petulant license, a whole bucket of water was poured on him by playful brawl, which stiffened his limbs. The regret he conceived at such an affront, coupled with some physical indisposition contracted from the excessive dampness, drew him, to the grave.

In addition to a collection of his Latin Prose and rhymes, two other works were printed posthumously: in 1527 the Poematum libri duo, or the life of Sallust, and, in 1552, the commentary on Book XVI of Cicero Familiari. Unpublished is his Zibaldone preserved today in manuscript at the Bavarian State Library in Munich.
