= Giuseppe Ugolino =

Italian sculptor and painter (1826–1897)

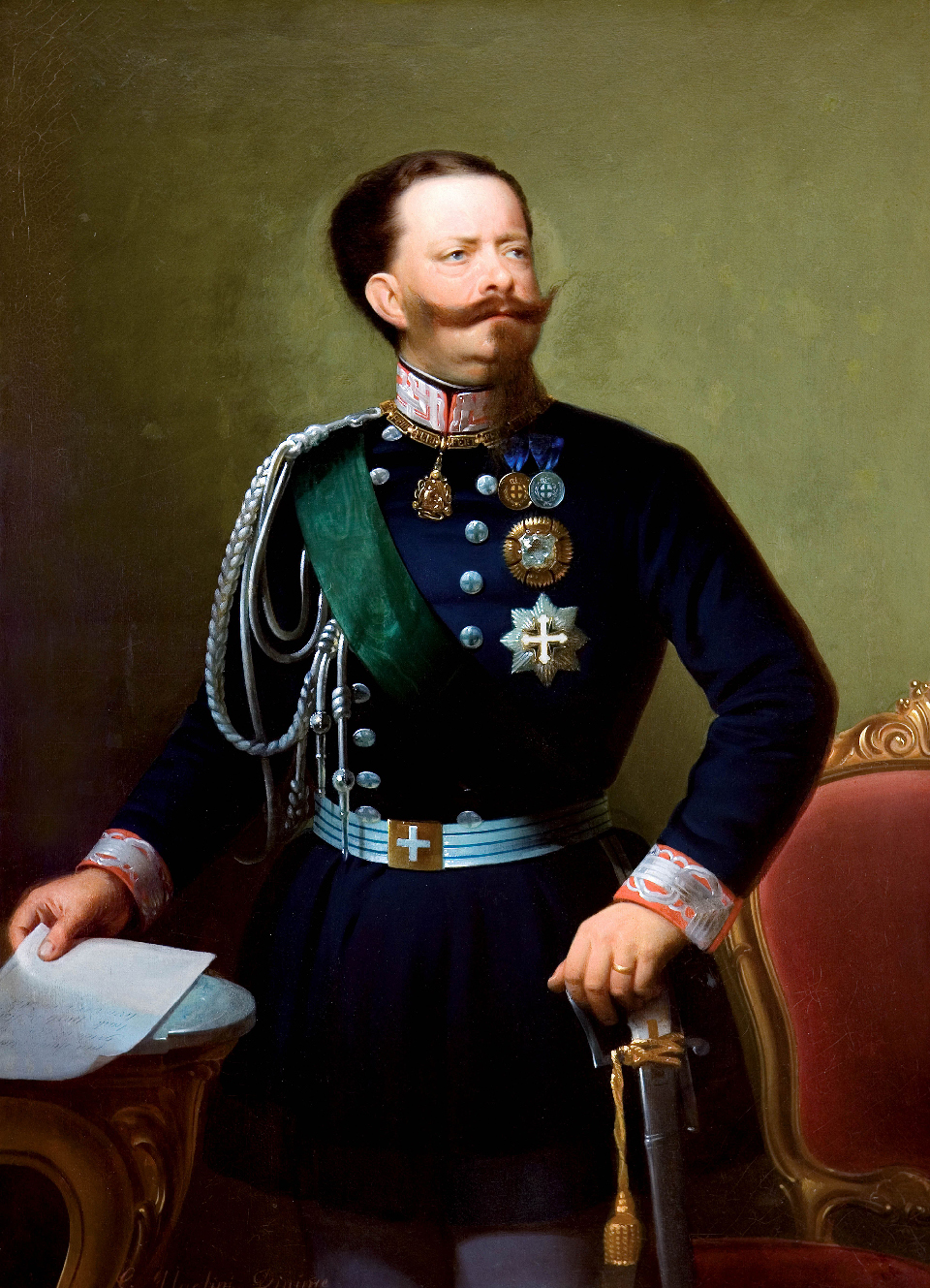
Giuseppe Ugolini, Vittorio Emanuele II, Tricolour Flag Museum, Reggio Emilia

Giuseppe Ugolino (Reggio Emilia, 1826 – San Felice Circeo, 1897) was an Italian sculptor and painter.

He was a pupil in Reggio of Prospero Minghetti, but traveled to Rome and Milan to pursue his work as a portraitist in both oil or marble. He also made engravings.

He completed two large frescoes (now lost) for the church of San Nazzaro e Celso, Milan. He also painted an altarpiece of the Death of Santa Monica for the church of Sant'Agostino in Reggio Emilia. He painted the Portrait of Giovanni Pagani, found in the painting gallery of the Ospedale Maggiore of Milan. Ugolini also painted portraits from photographs of the Taikun (shōgun) of Japan and the shōgun's wife. For the shōgun, he completed his portraits of the principal monarchs of Europe.

In Milan he completed an oil portrait of King Umberto I and Vittorio Emanuele II. In Rome he completed two marble portraits of queen Margherita. He sculpted busts of the painter Hayez, Father Secchi, Alessandro Manzoni, and Marco Minghetti. Other works by Ugolini are: Il messaggero inconscio and II fido messaggero, exhibited at Rome and Turin. He was made a knight of the Order of the Crown of Italy.
