= Ugo Ugochukwu =

American racing driver (born 2007)

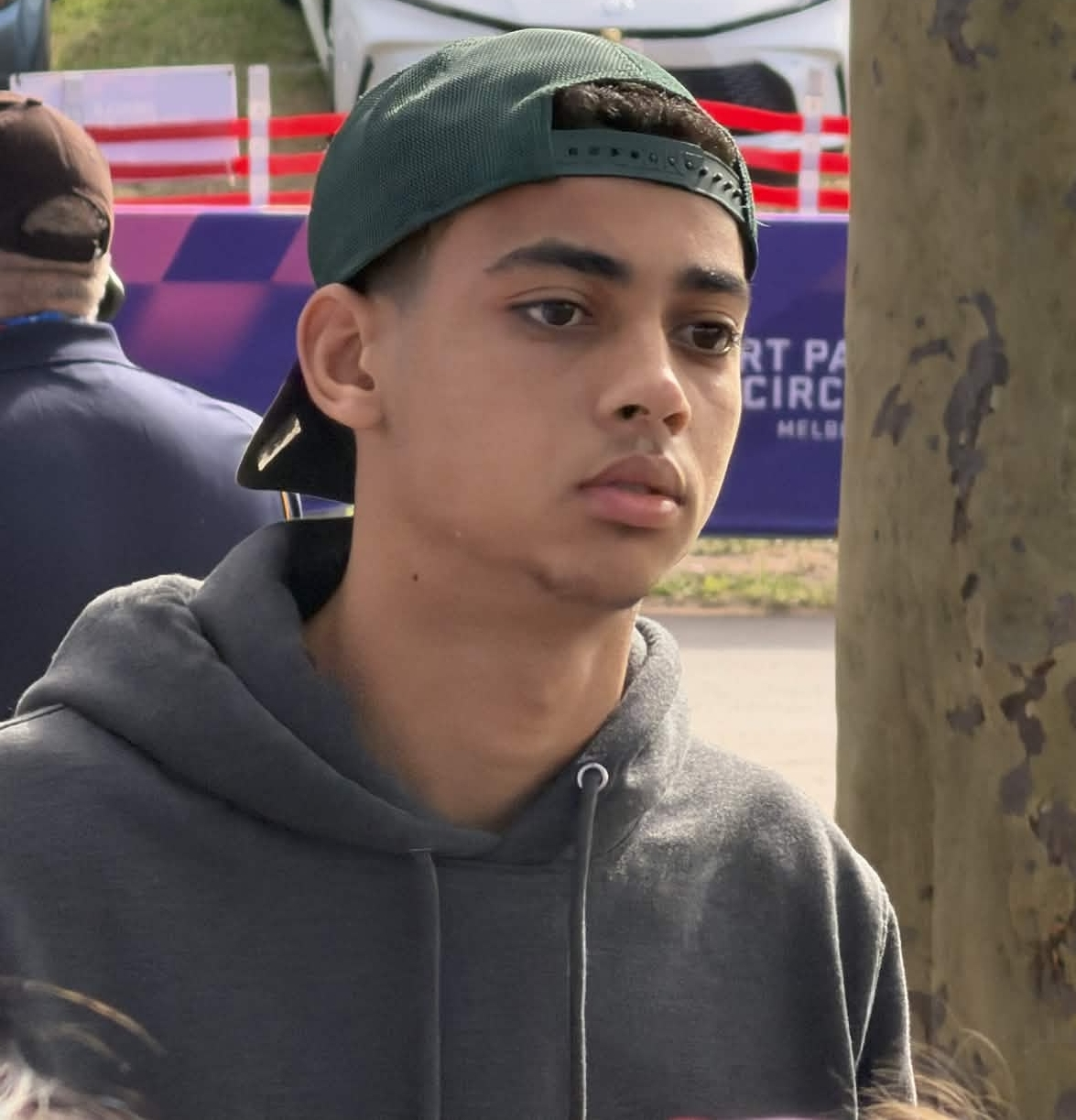
- Ugochukwu at the Melbourne F3 round in 2026
- Born: Ugo Ugochukwu Orlandi; April 23, 2007 (age 19); New York City, U.S.
- Parent: Oluchi Onweagba (mother)
- Nationality: (United States) American

FIA Formula 3 Championship career
- Debut season: 2025
- Current team: Campos
- Car number: 2
- Former teams: Prema
- Starts: 38
- Wins: 2
- Podiums: 9
- Poles: 0
- Fastest laps: 3
- Best finish: 1st in 2026

Previous series
- 2026; 2025–2026; 2024; 2024; 2024; 2023; 2023; 2022–2023; 2022; 2022: FR Oceania; FIA Formula 3; FR European; FR Middle East; GB3; Euro 4; F4 UAE; Italian F4; ADAC F4; F4 British

Championship titles
- 2026; 2026; 2024; 2023: FIA Formula 3; FR Oceania; Macau Grand Prix; Euro 4
- Statistics up to date as of 13 September 2026.

Ugo Ugochukwu Orlandi (Igbo pronunciation: [ù.ɡó ù.ɡò.t͡ʃú.kwú]; born April 23, 2007) is an American racing driver, set to compete in FIA Formula 2 for Campos Racing. He was crowned the FIA Formula 3 Drivers' Champion in 2026. Born and raised in New York City, Ugochukwu is the son of Nigerian fashion model Oluchi Onweagba and her Italian husband.

After early success in karting with Sauber, Ugochukwu got signed to the McLaren Driver Development Programme aged 13. Noted for his tall height since his single-seater debut in 2022, Ugochukwu finished third in British F4 for Carlin and second in Italian F4 for Prema. He graduated to the Formula Regional European Championship in 2024, and became the first American victor of the Macau Grand Prix in 43 years. Ugochukwu moved up to FIA Formula 3 with Prema in 2025, but was dropped by McLaren and Prema after a winless season. The following year he won the title with Campos, becoming the first American in history to do so. He is set to compete in FIA Formula 2 with Campos in 2027.

== Early and personal life ==
Ugo Ugochukwu Orlandi was born in New York City on April 23, 2007. His father, Luca Orlandi, is an Italian fashion designer and his mother, Oluchi Onweagba, is a Nigerian fashion model.

Ugochukwu is noted for his tall height relative to his competitors.

== Career ==
=== Karting ===
Ugochukwu began his karting career in USA, winning the Micro ROK Cup USA in 2014 and the Florida Winter Tour in 2015 before moving to Italy to compete in European championships. He went on to win the X30 Mini category of the IAME International Open in 2017 and the Junior ROK category of the Challenge of the Americas in 2018. In 2020 he took victory in the FIA OK-Junior European Karting Championship.

=== Formula 4 ===
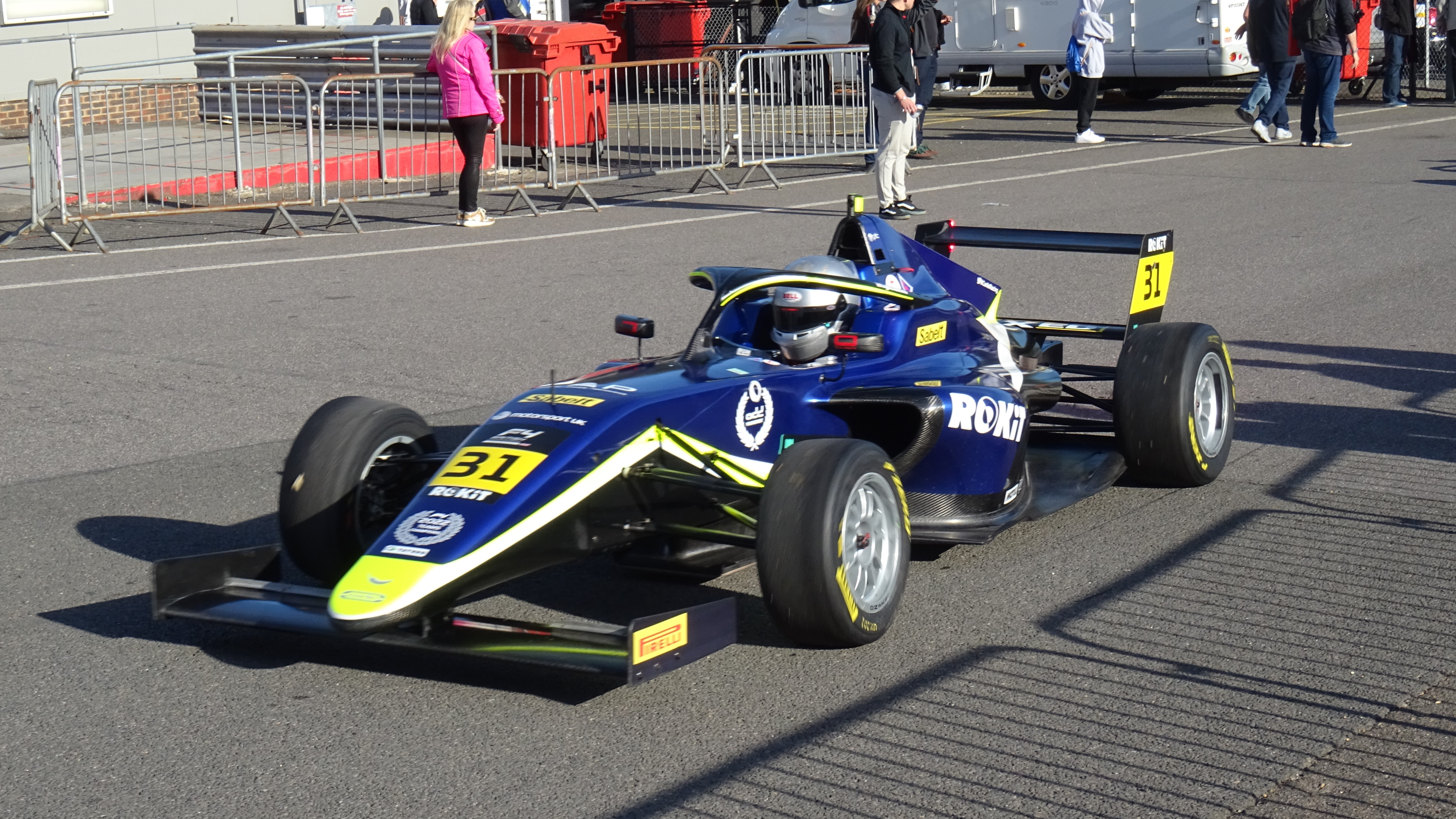
Ugochukwu racing at Brands Hatch during the 2022 F4 British Championship

==== 2022 ====
In 2021, Ugochukwu took part in an F4 testing program with Motopark, including tracks like Estoril and Oschersleben. In 2022 he progressed onto the junior formula ladder, driving for Carlin in British F4 alongside Williams junior Oliver Gray and New Zealander Louis Sharp. On the day of his first weekend, when Ugochukwu turned fifteen which allowed him to be eligible to race in Formula 4, Ugochukwu took his first pole position. He would be unable to convert it into a victory, taking third place along with the fastest lap in race 1 at Donington Park. In the remainder of the season, Ugochukwu took two race wins at Brands Hatch and Knockhill to finish third in the championship behind Alex Dunne and Oliver Gray and also became Rookie Cup champion.

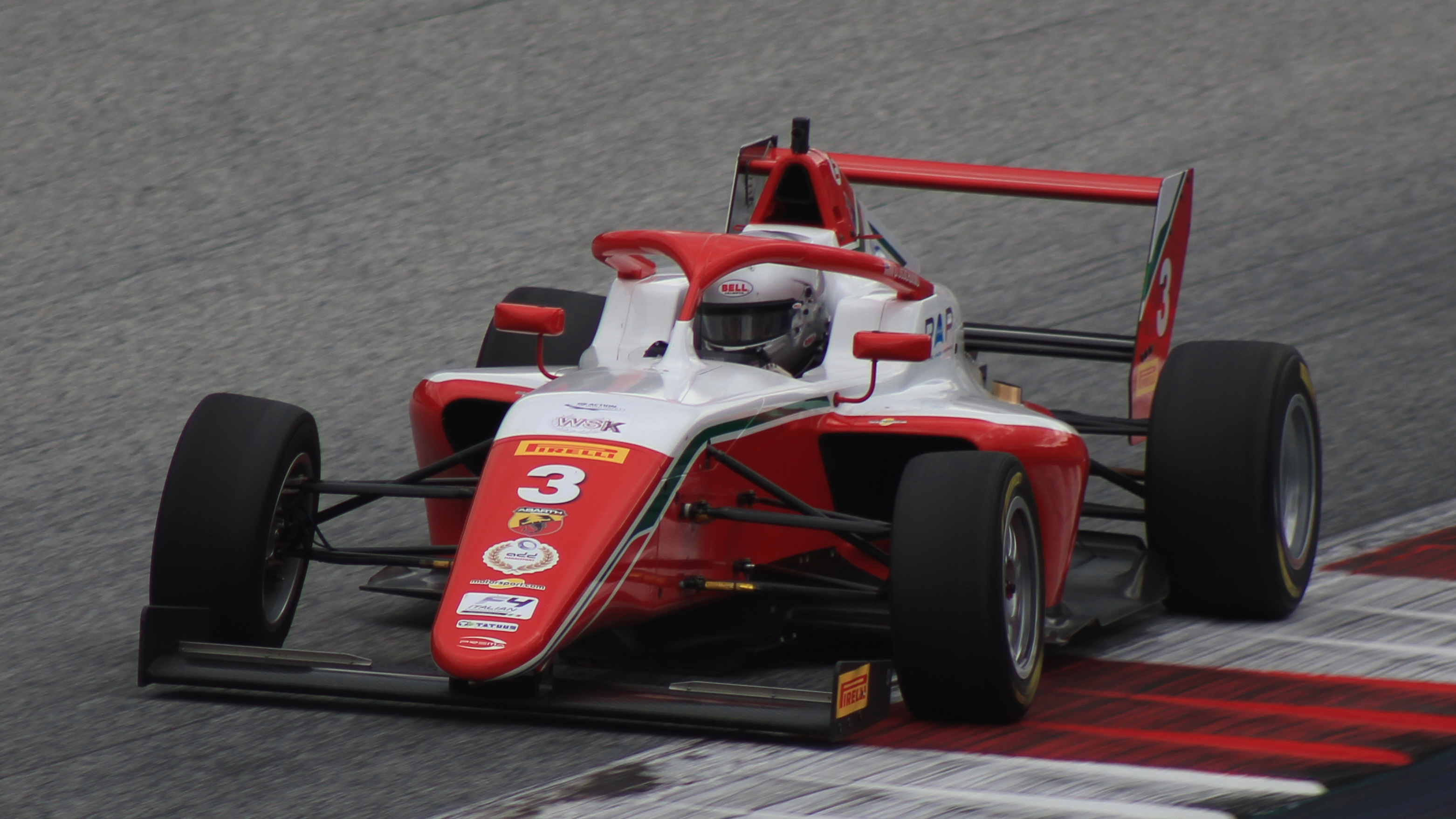
Ugochukwu driving at the Red Bull Ring during the 2022 Italian F4 Championship

In August, Ugochukwu joined Prema Racing to race in some of the remaining rounds of the Italian F4 Championship and ADAC Formula 4 Championship, where he achieved multiple podium finishes.

==== 2023 ====
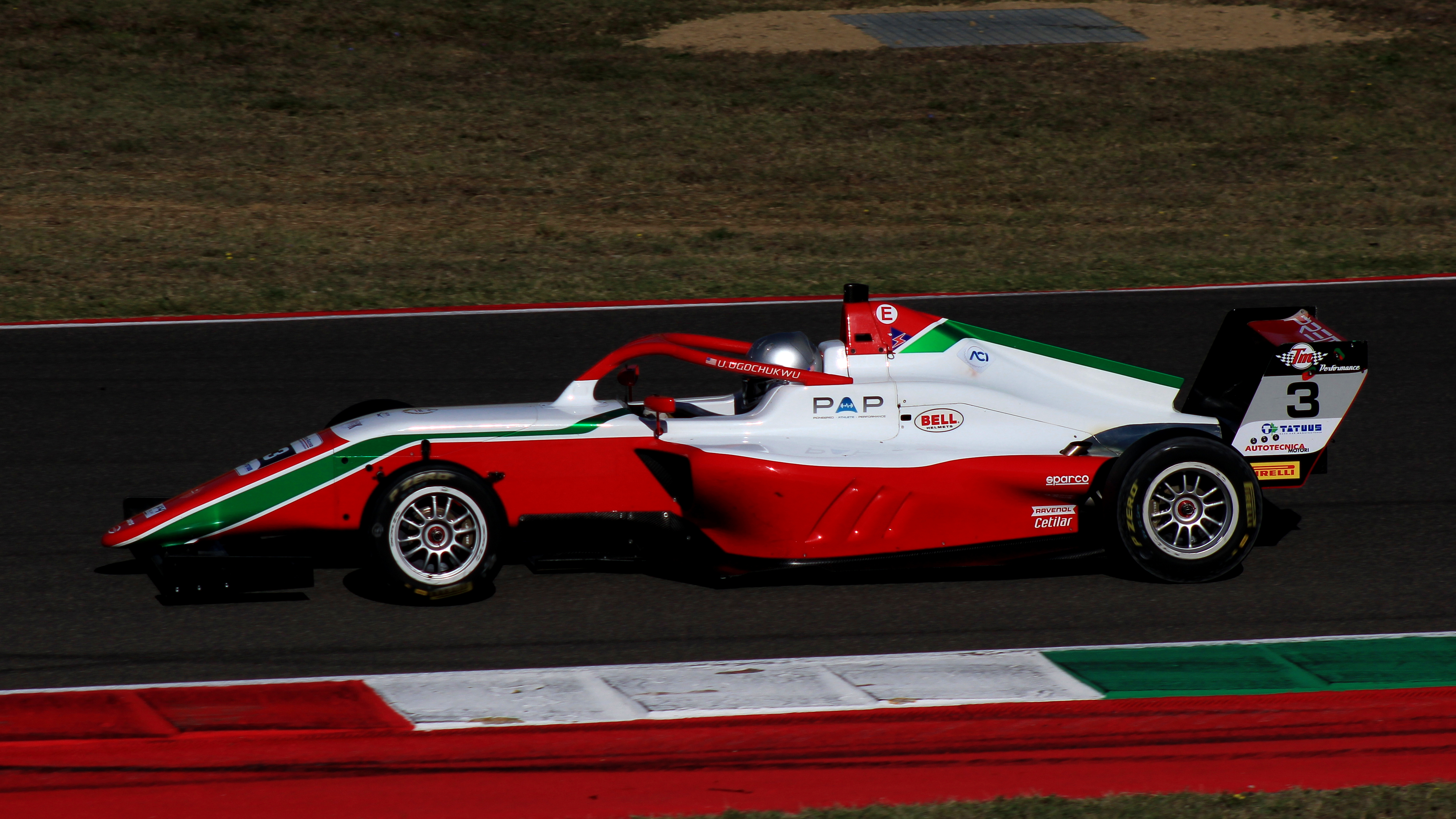
Ugochukwu driving at the Mugello Circuit during the 2023 Italian F4 Championship

Ugochukwu remained with Prema for 2023 competing in the Formula 4 UAE Championship and Italian F4 Championship. In the UAE championship, he took five wins en route to third in the standings. In the Italian championship he became vice-champion after fighting Kacper Sztuka for the title until the final round at Vallelunga Circuit. In 2023 Ugochukwu also became the first champion of the new Euro 4 Championship.

=== Formula Regional ===
==== 2024 ====
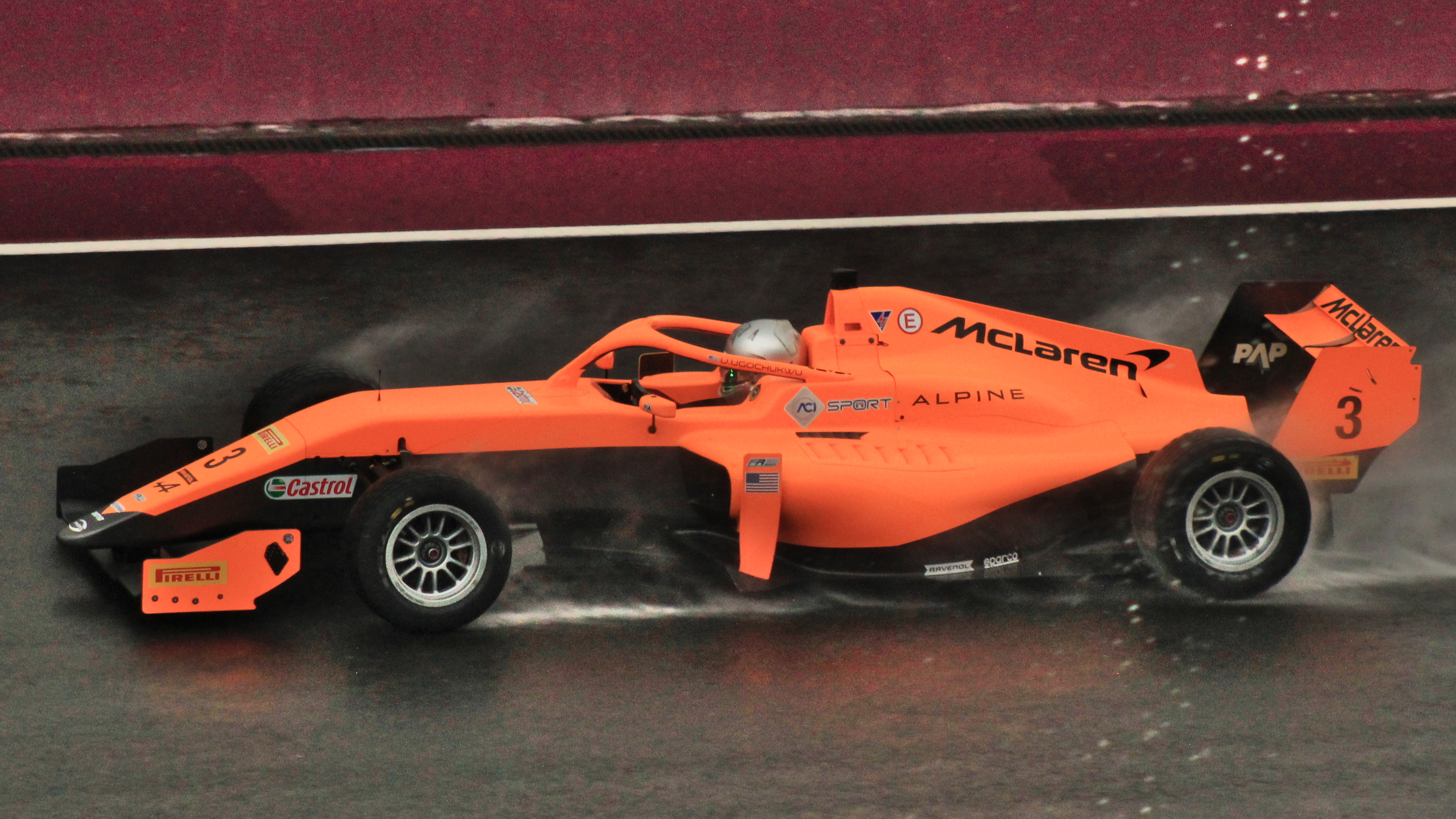
Ugochukwu driving at the Hungaroring during the 2024 Formula Regional European Championship

In 2024, Ugochukwu remained with Prema Racing to compete in the Formula Regional European Championship where he finished eleventh, taking a race win at the season finale at Monza. Ugochukwu also competed in the Formula Regional Middle East Championship with the Mumbai Falcons, placing seventh overall.

Alongside his main campaign in Formula Regional European Championship, Ugochukwu competed in four rounds of the 2024 GB3 Championship with Rodin Motorsport. He scored three podiums over eleven races, finishing 13th in the overall standings.

Later that year, Ugochukwu joined R-ace GP to contest the Macau Grand Prix. He qualified on pole position and won the race, becoming the first American winner of the event since Bob Earl in 1981.

==== 2025 ====
In preparation for his Formula 3 season, Ugochukwu competed in the Formula Regional Middle East Championship with R-ace GP. He took his maiden FR Middle East victory in the first race at the Dubai Autodrome, having started from third position. With an additional five podiums, he finished third in the overall standings.

=== FIA Formula 3 ===
Ugochukwu took part in post-season testing of the 2023 FIA Formula 3 Championship with Rodin Carlin. He also competed in the non-championship Macau Grand Prix with Trident. A collision in the qualifying race meant he started the main race from the back row. He managed to improve to 15th position overall.

==== 2025 ====
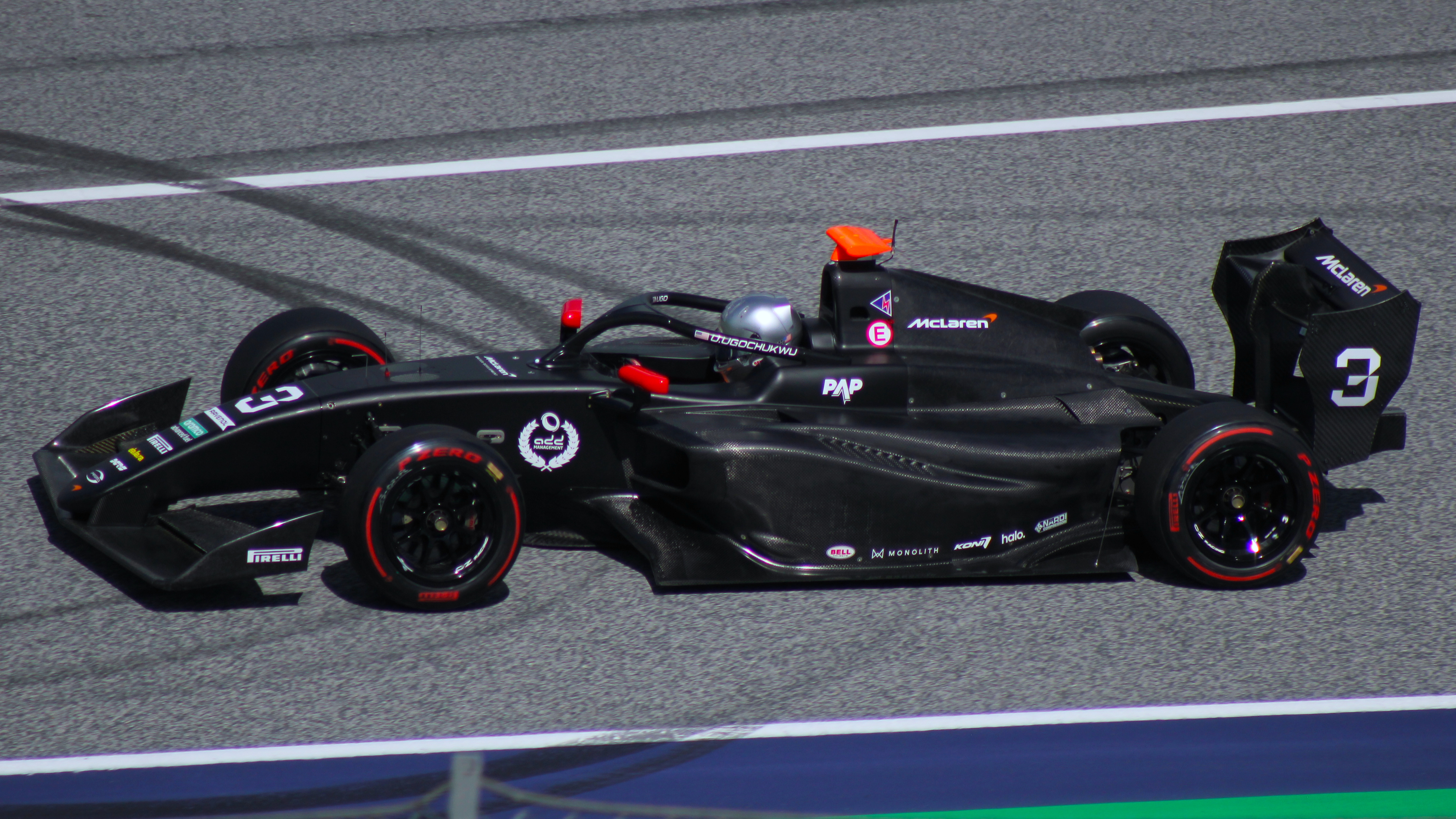
Ugochukwu driving the Dallara F3 2025 during the 2025 Spielberg Formula 3 round

In October 2024, Ugochukwu was announced to be stepping up to FIA Formula 3, whilst continuing his relationship with Prema Racing. Ugochukwu struggled during the first half of the campaign, only scoring two points finishes at Melbourne and Imola. At the same time as Prema stripped away his car's livery, Ugochukwu's form improved, as he took third on the road during the Spielberg sprint race. Though he was later given a ten-second penalty for leaving the track and gaining an advantage that demoted him from third to 16th, he finished fifth in the feature race and got promoted to fourth after a disqualification ahead. Ugochukwu then qualified second at Silverstone and took fifth on Saturday, but finished out of the points on Sunday after starting on dry tyres in a race that got progressively wetter, necessitating a pit stop.

Nonetheless, Ugochukwu continued his strong performances at Spa, where he charged up to second in the sprint race following passes on Charlie Wurz and Freddie Slater. He then executed another charging drive in the Budapest sprint to come second, though his run for a podium on Sunday was ended by a collision caused by Gerrard Xie. Ugochukwu qualified second for the season finale in Monza. He finished ninth in the sprint race but spun into the gravel in the feature, ending his race. Ugochukwu finished 16th in the drivers' standings, ahead of his teammates Noel León and Brando Badoer.

==== 2026 ====
Ugochukwu moved to reigning champions' Campos Racing for the 2026 season, alongside Théophile Naël and Ernesto Rivera. He went on to win the series with 159 points, 14 points ahead of his nearest rival Freddie Slater. They entered the final race on equal points. During the season, Ugochukwu won the Melbourne Feature race as well as the Silverstone Sprint race.

=== FIA Formula 2 ===
Ugochukwu will remain with Campos as he steps up to FIA Formula 2 in 2027.

=== Formula One ===
Following his victory in the FIA OK-Junior European Karting Championship with the Sauber Karting Team in 2020, Ugochukwu signed a long-term deal with the McLaren Driver Development Programme in 2021 to facilitate his transition from junior motorsport to professional racing driver. Ugochukwu departed McLaren in November 2025 amidst a major shakeup in the roster. In June 2026, he tested a Formula One car for the first time, driving the Alpine A524 during a private test session in Monza.

=== Formula E ===
In May 2024, McLaren Formula E Team announced that Ugochukwu and Grégoire Saucy would drive for the team at the official rookie test at the Berlin ePrix.

== Karting record ==
=== Karting career summary ===
Season	Series	Team	Position
2015	SKUSA Pro Tour — TaG Cadet		12th
2015	SKUSA SuperNationals — TaG Cadet	Team Koene USA	34th
2015	Florida Winter Tour — Rotax Micro Max		**1st**
2016	WSK Champions Cup — 60 Mini	Orlandi, Luca	NC
2016	WSK Super Master Series — 60 Mini	Energy Corse	28th
2016	WSK Night Edition — 60 Mini	Energy Corse	27th
2016	Italian Championship — 60 Mini		6th
2016	ROK Cup Italy Area Nord — Mini ROK		56th
2016	ROK Cup International Final — Mini ROK	Energy Corse	12th
2016	SKUSA SuperNationals — Mini Swift		18th
2016	WSK Final Cup — 60 Mini	Energy Corse	32nd
2017	WSK Champions Cup — 60 Mini	ASD Giugliano Kart	22nd
2017	WSK Super Master Series — 60 Mini	ASD Giugliano Kart	7th
2017	IAME International Open — X30 Mini		**1st**
2017	IAME Euro Series — X30 Mini		10th
2017	Italian Championship — 60 Mini		**2nd**
2017	IAME International Final — X30 Mini		15th
2018	Florida Winter Tour — Junior ROK		**2nd**
2018	Challenge of the Americas — Junior ROK		**1st**
2018	Italian Championship — ROK Junior		**2nd**
2018	Italian Championship — X30 Junior		10th
2019	WSK Champions Cup — OKJ	Ricky Flynn Motorsport	9th
2019	WSK Super Master Series — OKJ	Ricky Flynn Motorsport	17th
2019	Coupe de France — OKJ		**3rd**
2019	WSK Euro Series — OKJ	Ricky Flynn Motorsport	4th
2019	Italian Championship — OKJ		5th
2019	CIK-FIA European Championship — OKJ	Ricky Flynn Motorsport	8th
2019	CIK-FIA World Championship — OKJ	Ricky Flynn Motorsport	30th
2019	WSK Open Cup — OKJ	Ricky Flynn Motorsport	4th
2019	WSK Final Cup — OKJ	Ricky Flynn Motorsport	4th
2020	WSK Champions Cup — OKJ	Ricky Flynn Motorsport	25th
2020	South Garda Winter Cup — OKJ	Ricky Flynn Motorsport	32nd
2020	WSK Super Master Series — OKJ	Ricky Flynn Motorsport	5th
2020	CIK-FIA European Championship — OKJ	KR Motorsport	**1st**
2020	WSK Euro Series — OKJ	Sauber Karting Team	9th
2020	Champions of the Future — OKJ	Sauber Karting Team	**2nd**
2020	CIK-FIA World Championship — OKJ	Sauber Karting Team	8th
2020	WSK Open Cup — OKJ	Sauber Karting Team	33rd
2021	WSK Champions Cup — OK	Sauber ORLEN Karting Team	6th
2021	WSK Super Master Series — OK	Sauber ORLEN Karting Team	11th
2021	WSK Euro Series — OK	KR Motorsport	**2nd**
2021	CIK-FIA European Championship — OK	KR Motorsport	7th
2021	WSK Open Cup — OK	KR Motorsport	7th
2021	Champions of the Future — OK	KR Motorsport	13th
2021	CIK-FIA World Championship — OK	KR Motorsport	4th

=== Complete CIK-FIA Karting European Championship results ===
(key) (Races in bold indicate pole position) (Races in italics indicate fastest lap)

Year	Team	Class	1	2	3	4	5	6	7	8	DC	Points
2019	Ricky Flynn Motorsport	OKJ	ANG; QH; 4	ANG; R 5	GEN; QH; 45	GEN; R DNQ	KRI; QH; 35	KRI; R DNQ	LEM; QH; 7	LEM; R 3	8th	38
2020	KR Motorsport	OKJ	ZUE; QH; 13	ZUE; R 2							1st	65
2020	Sauber Karting Team	OKJ			SAR; QH; 1	**SAR**; **R** 1	WAC; QH; 1	**WAC**; **R** (2)			1st	65
2021	KR Motorsport	OK	GEN; QH; 13	GEN; R 10	AUB; QH; 7	AUB; R 7	SAR; QH; 10	SAR; R 8	ZUE; QH; 22	ZUE; R 35	7th	28

== Racing record ==
=== Racing career summary ===
Season	Series	Team	Races	Wins	Poles	F/Laps	Podiums	Points	Position
2022	F4 British Championship	Carlin	30	2	3	8	11	290	**3rd**
2022	ADAC Formula 4 Championship	Prema Racing	6	0	0	0	2	—N/a	NC†
2022	Italian F4 Championship	Prema Racing	6	0	0	0	4	84	10th
2023	Formula 4 UAE Championship	Prema Racing	15	5	2	4	8	185	**3rd**
2023	Italian F4 Championship	Prema Racing	21	3	3	4	13	280	**2nd**
2023	Euro 4 Championship	Prema Racing	9	3	1	2	5	193	**1st**
2023	Macau Grand Prix	Trident	1	0	0	0	0	—N/a	15th
2024	Formula Regional Middle East Championship	Mumbai Falcons Racing Limited	15	0	0	0	3	105	7th
2024	Formula Regional European Championship	Prema Racing	20	1	1	0	2	76	11th
2024	GB3 Championship	Rodin Motorsport	11	0	0	0	3	185	13th
2024	Macau Grand Prix	R-ace GP	1	1	1	0	1	—N/a	**1st**
2025	Formula Regional Middle East Championship	R-ace GP	15	1	1	2	6	205	**3rd**
2025	FIA Formula 3 Championship	Prema Racing	19	0	0	0	2	43	16th
2026	Formula Regional Oceania Trophy	M2 Competition	15	4	2	4	8	326	**1st**
2026	FIA Formula 3 Championship	Campos Racing	19	2	0	3	7	159	**1st**
2027	FIA Formula 2 Championship	Campos Racing	0	0	0	0	0	0	TBD

^{†} Driver participated as a guest driver and was thus ineligible to score points.
* Season still in progress.

=== Complete F4 British Championship results ===
(key) (Races in bold indicate pole position) (Races in italics indicate fastest lap)

Year	Team	1	2	3	4	5	6	7	8	9	10	11	12	13	14	15	16	17	18	19	20	21	22	23	24	25	26	27	28	29	30	DC	Points
2022	Carlin	**DON**; **1**; 3	DON; 2; 9^{1}	DON; 3; 5	BHI; 1; 4	BHI; 2; 4^{3}	BHI; 3; 1	THR1; 1; 2	THR1; 2; 6^{3}	THR1; 3; 2	OUL; 1 Ret	OUL; 2; 3^{1}	OUL; 3; 10	CRO; 1; 2	CRO; 2; 13†	CRO; 3; 13†	**KNO**; **1**; 11	KNO; 2; 8	**KNO**; **3**; 1	SNE; 1; 15	SNE; 2; 2^{2}	SNE; 3; 6	THR2; 1; 2	THR2; 2; 9	THR2; 3; 2	SIL; 1 Ret	SIL; 2; 2^{3}	SIL; 3; 6	BHGP; 1; 4	BHGP; 2; 5	BHGP; 3; 6	3rd	290

=== Complete Italian F4 Championship results ===
(key) (Races in bold indicate pole position) (Races in italics indicate fastest lap)

Year	Team	1	2	3	4	5	6	7	8	9	10	11	12	13	14	15	16	17	18	19	20	21	22	DC	Points
2022	Prema Racing	IMO; 1	IMO; 2	IMO; 3	MIS; 1	MIS; 2	MIS; 3	SPA; 1	SPA; 2	SPA; 3	VLL; 1	VLL; 2	VLL; 3	RBR; 1; 3	RBR; 2	RBR; 3; 2	RBR; 4; 3	MNZ; 1	MNZ; 2	MNZ; 3	MUG; 1; 6	MUG; 2; 5	MUG; 3; 2	10th	84
2023	Prema Racing	IMO; 1	**IMO**; **2**; 1	**IMO**; **3** DNS	IMO; 4; 3	MIS; 1; 6	MIS; 2; 3	MIS; 3; 2	SPA; 1; 4	SPA; 2; 7	SPA; 3; 1	MNZ; 1; 25†	MNZ; 2; 2	MNZ; 3; 8	**LEC**; **1**; 2	LEC; 2; 3	LEC; 3; 5	MUG; 1; 2	MUG; 2; 2	MUG; 3; 2	VLL; 1; 1	VLL; 2; 4	VLL; 3; 2	2nd	280

† Ugochukwu finished 1st on track, but received three post-race penalties - one ten-second penalty for dangerous driving, and two five-second penalties for overtaking off-track.

=== Complete Formula 4 UAE Championship results ===
(key) (Races in bold indicate pole position) (Races in italics indicate fastest lap)

Year	Team	1	2	3	4	5	6	7	8	9	10	11	12	13	14	15	Pos	Points
2023	Prema Racing	**DUB1**; **1**; 1	DUB1; 2; 1	DUB1; 3; 3	KMT1; 1; 3	KMT1; 2; 1	KMT1; 3; 18	**KMT2**; **1**; 1	KMT2; 2; 4	KMT2; 3; 35†	DUB2; 1; 9	DUB2; 2 Ret	DUB2; 3; 10	YMC; 1; 11	YMC; 2; 3	YMC; 3; 1	3rd	185

=== Complete Euro 4 Championship results ===
(key) (Races in bold indicate pole position; races in italics indicate fastest lap)

Year	Team	1	2	3	4	5	6	7	8	9	DC	Points
2023	Prema Racing	MUG; 1; 1	MUG; 2; 1	MUG; 3; 2	MNZ; 1; 4	MNZ; 2; 7	MNZ; 3; 21	CAT; 1; 4	CAT; 2; 2	**CAT**; **3**; 1	1st	193

=== Complete Macau Grand Prix results ===
Year	Team	Car	Qualifying	Quali Race	Main race
2023	(Italy) Trident Motorsport	Dallara F3 2019	9th	DNF	15th
2024	(France) R-ace GP	Tatuus F3 T318	**1st**	**1st**	**1st**

=== Complete Formula Regional Middle East Championship results ===
(key) (Races in bold indicate pole position) (Races in italics indicate fastest lap)

Year	Entrant	1	2	3	4	5	6	7	8	9	10	11	12	13	14	15	DC	Points
2024	Mumbai Falcons Racing Limited	YMC1; 1; 16	YMC1; 2; 11	YMC1; 3; 3	YMC2; 1; 10	YMC2; 2 Ret	YMC2; 3; 7	DUB1; 1; 6	DUB1; 2; 4	DUB1; 3; 9	YMC3; 1; 6	YMC3; 2; 2	YMC3; 3 Ret	DUB2; 1; 3	DUB2; 2; 4	DUB2; 3; 6	7th	105
2025	R-ace GP	YMC1; 1; 10	YMC1; 2; 4	YMC1; 3 Ret	YMC2; 1; 7	YMC2; 2; 4	YMC2; 3; 19†	DUB; 1; 1	DUB; 2; 5	DUB; 3; 2	YMC3; 1; 2	YMC3; 2; 8	YMC3; 3; 3	LUS; 1; 2	LUS; 2; 7	**LUS**; **3**; 2	3rd	205

=== Complete GB3 Championship results ===
(key) (Races in bold indicate pole position) (Races in italics indicate fastest lap)

Year	Team	1	2	3	4	5	6	7	8	9	10	11	12	13	14	15	16	17	18	19	20	21	22	23	24	DC	Points
2024	Rodin Motorsport	OUL; 1; 3	OUL; 2; 4	OUL; 3; 3^{7}	SIL1; 1; 6	SIL1; 2; 2	SIL1; 3 C	SPA; 1; 4	SPA; 2; 4	SPA; 3 Ret	HUN; 1	HUN; 2	HUN; 3	ZAN; 1	ZAN; 2	ZAN; 3	SIL2; 1; 8	SIL2; 2; 6	SIL2; 3; 21	DON; 1	DON; 2	DON; 3	BRH; 1	BRH; 2	BRH; 3	13th	185

=== Complete Formula Regional European Championship results ===
(key) (Races in bold indicate pole position) (Races in italics indicate fastest lap)

Year	Team	1	2	3	4	5	6	7	8	9	10	11	12	13	14	15	16	17	18	19	20	DC	Points
2024	Prema Racing	HOC; 1; 7	HOC; 2 Ret	SPA; 1; 15	SPA; 2; 21	ZAN; 1; 28	ZAN; 2; 10	HUN; 1; 8	HUN; 2; 3	MUG; 1; 10	MUG; 2; 13	LEC; 1 DSQ	LEC; 2 DSQ	IMO; 1; 15	IMO; 2; 5	RBR; 1; 8	RBR; 2; 20	CAT; 1 Ret	CAT; 2; 8	**MNZ**; **1**; 1	MNZ; 2; 7	11th	76

=== Complete FIA Formula 3 Championship results ===
(key) (Races in bold indicate pole position) (Races in italics indicate fastest lap)

Year	Entrant	1	2	3	4	5	6	7	8	9	10	11	12	13	14	15	16	17	18	19	20	DC	Points
2025	Prema Racing	MEL; SPR; 12	MEL; FEA; 10	BHR; SPR; Ret	BHR; FEA; 27	IMO; SPR; 8	IMO; FEA; 14	MON; SPR; 13	MON; FEA; 14	CAT; SPR; 22	CAT; FEA; 20	RBR; SPR; 16	RBR; FEA; 4	SIL; SPR; 5	SIL; FEA; 21	SPA; SPR; 2	SPA; FEA; C	HUN; SPR; 2	HUN; FEA; Ret	MNZ; SPR; 9	MNZ; FEA; Ret	16th	43
2026	Campos Racing	MEL; SPR; 8	MEL; FEA; 1	MON; SPR; 6	MON; FEA; 4	CAT; SPR; Ret	CAT; FEA; 3	RBR; SPR; 9	RBR; FEA; 2	SIL; SPR; 1	SIL; FEA; 3	SPA; SPR; 29	SPA; FEA; 20	HUN; SPR; 17	HUN; FEA; 2	MNZ; SPR; 13	MNZ; FEA; 8	MAD; SPR; 8	MAD; FEA1; 4	MAD; FEA2; 2		1st	159

=== Complete Formula Regional Oceania Trophy results ===
(key) (Races in bold indicate pole position) (Races in italics indicate fastest lap)

Year	Team	1	2	3	4	5	6	7	8	9	10	11	12	13	14	15	16	DC	Points
2026	M2 Competition	**HMP**; **1**; 2	HMP; 2; 5	HMP; 3; 1	**HMP**; **4**; 1	TAU; 1; 2	TAU; 2; 3	TAU; 3; 11	TAU; 4; 4	TER; 1; 8	TER; 2; 1	TER; 3 C	TER; 4; 14	HIG; 1; 2	HIG; 2; 1	HIG; 3; 7	HIG; 3; 9	1st	326

=== Complete New Zealand Grand Prix results ===
Year	Team	Car	Qualifying	Main race
2026	(New Zealand) M2 Competition	Tatuus FT-60 - Toyota	13th	9th

=== Complete FIA Formula 2 Championship results ===
(key) (Races in bold indicate pole position) (Races in italics indicate fastest lap)

Year	Entrant	1	2	3	4	5	6	7	8	9	10	11	12	13	14	15	16	17	18	19	20	21	22	23	24	25	26	27	28	DC	Points
2027	Campos Racing	BHR; SPR	BHR; FEA	JED; SPR	JED; FEA	MEL; SPR	MEL; FEA	MTL; SPR	MTL; FEA	MON; SPR	MON; FEA	SIL; SPR	SIL; FEA	RBR; SPR	RBR; FEA	MNZ; SPR	MNZ; FEA	MAD; SPR	MAD; FEA	BAK; SPR	BAK; FEA	IST; SPR	IST; FEA	MXC; SPR	MXC; FEA	LSL; SPR	LSL; FEA	YMC; SPR	YMC; FEA	TBD	TBD

Sporting positions
Preceded by Inaugural	Euro 4 Championship; Champion; 2023	Succeeded by Akshay Bohra
Preceded by Luke Browning	Macau Grand Prix; Winner; 2024	Succeeded by Théophile Naël
Preceded by Rafael Câmara	FIA Formula 3 Championship; Champion; 2026	Succeeded by Incumbent
