= Filippo Galli (poet) =

Italian poet (c. 1465–1503)

Filippo Galli (c. 1465 in Monticiano – 26 November 1503 in Monte San Savino), also known as Filenio Gallo, was an Italian poet, best remembered for his pastoral poetry in the vernacular, and for a poem dedicated to Catherine Cornaro. He was a member of the Order of Saint Augustine and was magister at Sant'Elena, Venice.
