= Ugolino and His Sons =

Ugolino and His Sons may refer to the following sculptures:

- Ugolino and His Sons (Carpeaux)
- Ugolino and His Sons (Rodin)

== See also ==
- Ugolino della Gherardesca
