= Troféu Roberto Ugolini =

- Organiser(s): CA Juventus
- Founded: 1959
- Abolished: 1960
- Region: São Paulo, Brazil
- Teams: 5
- Related competitions: Campeonato Paulista
- Most championships: Palmeiras (2 titles)

The Troféu Roberto Ugolini was a professional football tournament organized by Clube Atlético Juventus held in 1959 and 1960. The main teams in the city of São Paulo participated: Corinthians, Portuguesa, Palmeiras and São Paulo.

Palmeiras won the tournament both editions.

== List of champions ==
The Troféu Roberto Ugolini winners:

Season	Champions	Runners-up
1959	Palmeiras	São Paulo
1960	Palmeiras	Corinthians
