= Ugo Panziera =

Italian theologian

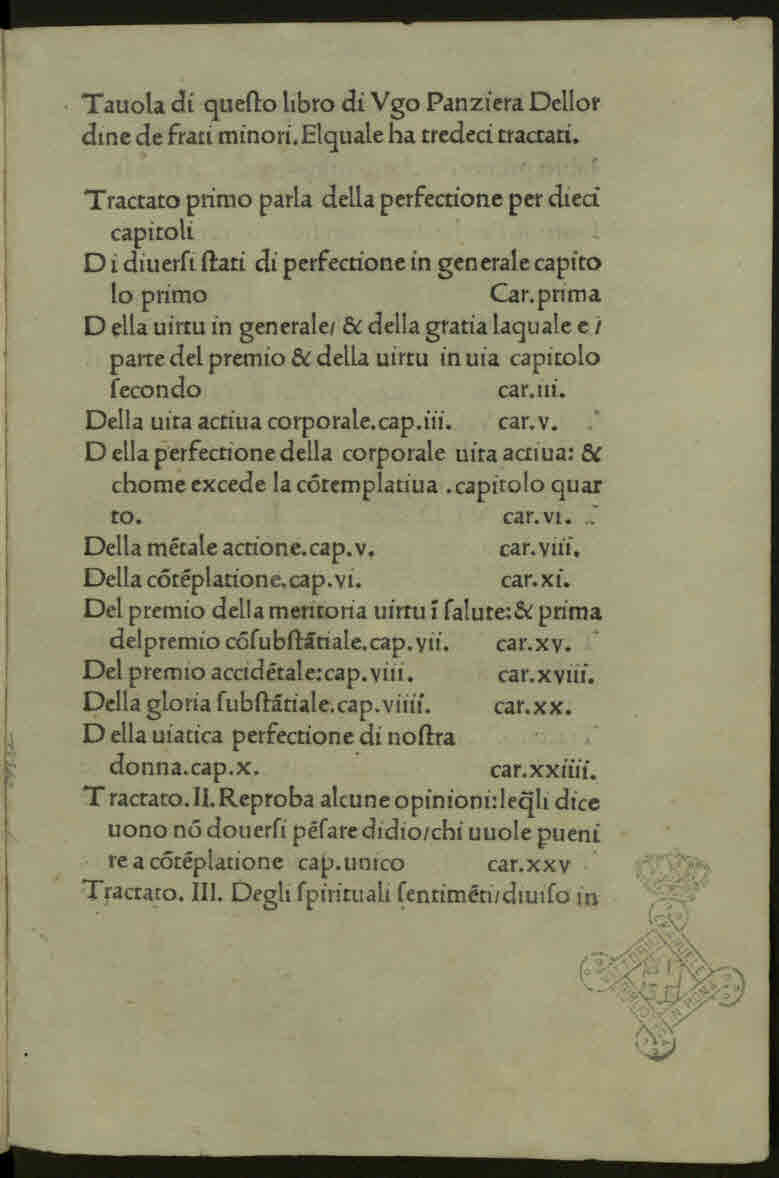
Spiritual Treatises

Blessed Ugo Panziera, or Panciera, also known as Ugo da Prato (circa 1260 – circa 1330), was an Italian theologian, Franciscan friar, missionary, and writer.

He wrote epistles, laude of Jacoponic inspiration, and thirteen spiritual treatises of Bonaventurian inspiration.

== Works ==
- Trattati spirituali [Spiritual Treatises] (in Italian). Firenze: Antonio Mischomini. 1492.
- Guasti, Cesare, ed. (1861). I cantici spirituali del beato Ugo Panziera [The Spiritual Canticles of the Blessed Ugo Panziera] (in Italian). Prato: Tipografia Guasti.
