= Ugolino di Vieri (poet) =

Italian poet (1438–1516)

Ugolino in the historiated initial at the start of his Carlias in manuscript 838 of the Biblioteca Riccardiana, a presentation copy from the workshop of Gherardo and Monte del Flora.

Ugolino di Vieri (1438 – 10 May 1516), also known as Verino, was an Italian notary and poet in the Republic of Florence, best remembered for his Latin dactylic hexameter. Born in Florence to a noble family of magistrates, he was trained under Cristoforo Landino, and served as a court poet to Lorenzo de' Medici. He was a humanist and humanities teacher to Pope Leo X, Francesco Pitti, and Crinitus. He was also given patronage by Girolamo Savonarola and the Piagnoni. He died in Florence.

His major poetical work, Flametta, was dedicated to Cosimo I de' Medici (1463) and then rededicated to Lorenzo de' Medici (1464). His Paradisus (1468–1469) was written in memory of Cosimo. Between 1469 and 1480, he composed an epic on Charlemagne entitled De gestis Magni Caroli, better known as Carlias. After a religious conversion, he dedicated his Carmen de christiana religione ac vitae monasticae felicitate (1491) to Savonarola and rejected secular poetry.

Ugolino's son, Michele di Vieri, known for his letters, predeceased his father at the age of eighteen.
