= McKenzy Cresswell =

British racing driver (born 2006)

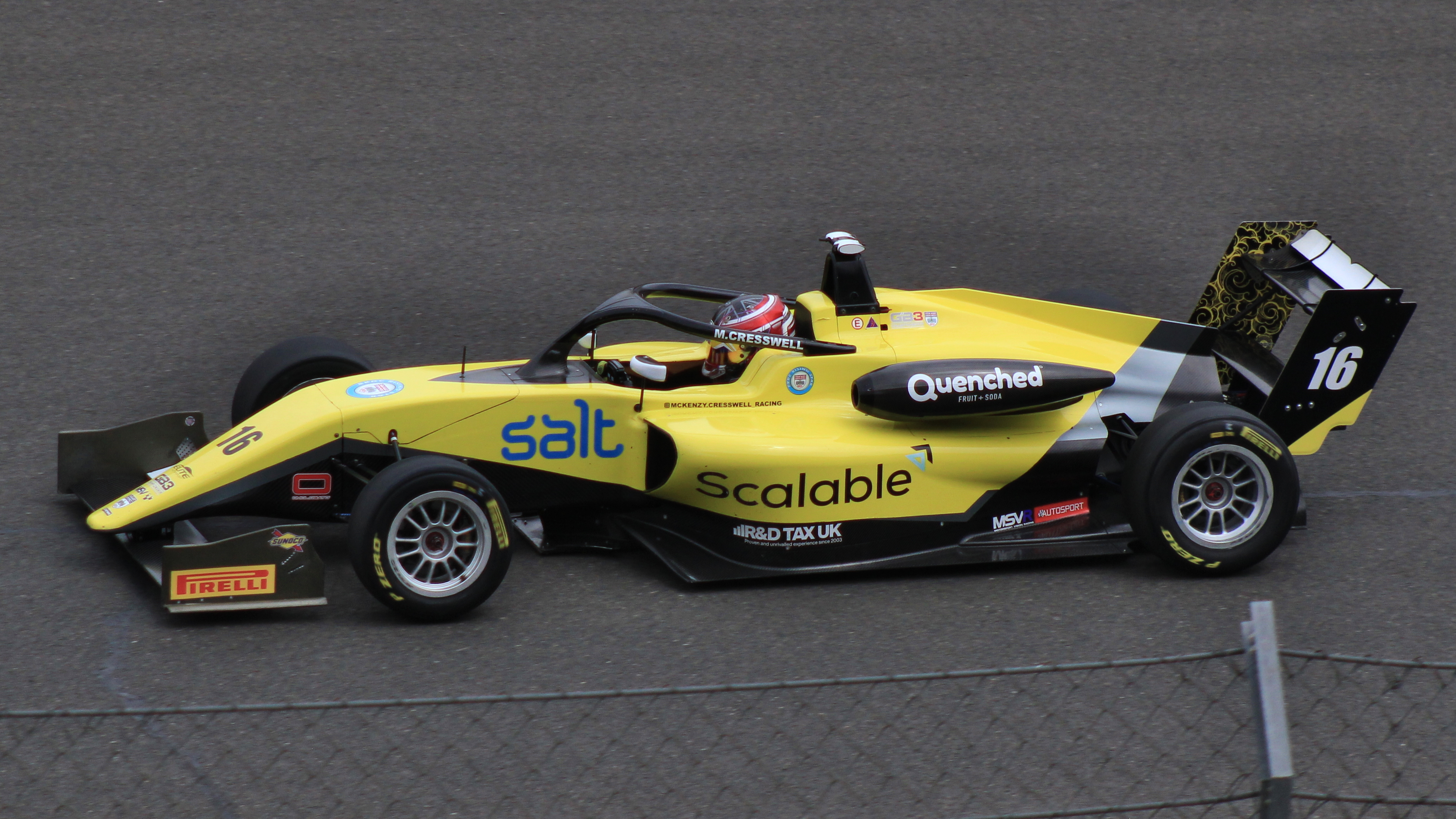
- Cresswell at the Hungaroring in 2024
- Nationality: (United Kingdom) British
- Born: 16 January 2006 (age 20) Kingston upon Thames, United Kingdom

GT4 European Series career
- Debut season: 2025
- Current team: Elite Motorsport
- Categorisation: FIA Silver
- Car number: 78
- Starts: 24 (24 entries)
- Championships: 1
- Wins: 4
- Podiums: 6
- Poles: 6
- Fastest laps: 0
- Best finish: 1st in 2026

Previous series
- 2025 2024 2024 2023 2022 2021: GT4 Winter Series; GB3 Championship; FIA Formula 3 Championship; GB3 Championship; GB3 Championship; F4 British Championship

McKenzy Cresswell (born 16 January 2006) is a British racing driver who last competed in the GT4 European Championship with Elite Motorsport. He previously finished fourth in the 2024 GB3 Championship, and is part of the BRDC Rising Star Programme. Cresswell was a substitute driver in the 2023 FIA Formula 3 Championship with PHM Racing by Charouz for two rounds. Cresswell was selected to join the McLaren GT3 Junior program in April 2026 and spearheads the McLaren Elite Talent Pathway.

== Career ==
=== Karting ===
Cresswell began karting at seven years old at the Austin, Texas location of K1 Speed, where he competed in the Junior League events. He subsequently competed in SKUSA karting events in the United States.

Upon his return to the UK, Cresswell competed with DSM-Sport in several British karting events.

=== F4 British Championship ===
==== 2021 ====
In December 2020, Cresswell signed for JHR Developments to race in the 2021 British F4 Championship. As a build up to the transition from karting, Cresswell spent time at iZone Performance at Silverstone, where in addition to practice on the simulator, he worked on mindfulness training.

On his debut weekend at Thruxton, Cresswell scored a best result of second having claimed third on the starting grid for the final race of the weekend. Thruxton was followed by two third-place finishes at the Snetterton round and a best result of second in changeable conditions at the Brands Hatch Indy weekend. The first victory of the season occurred in the reverse grid race in the following round at Oulton Park. Similarly at the next round at Knockhill in Scotland, Cresswell secured victory in the reverse grid. With a return to qualifying form at the Croft round, Cresswell had his most successful weekend of the season; scoring a double pole, double win, leading every lap and two fastest laps. At the final event of the 2021 season at Brands Hatch, Cresswell scored a double victory to finish third in the championship.

=== GB3 Championship ===
==== 2022 ====
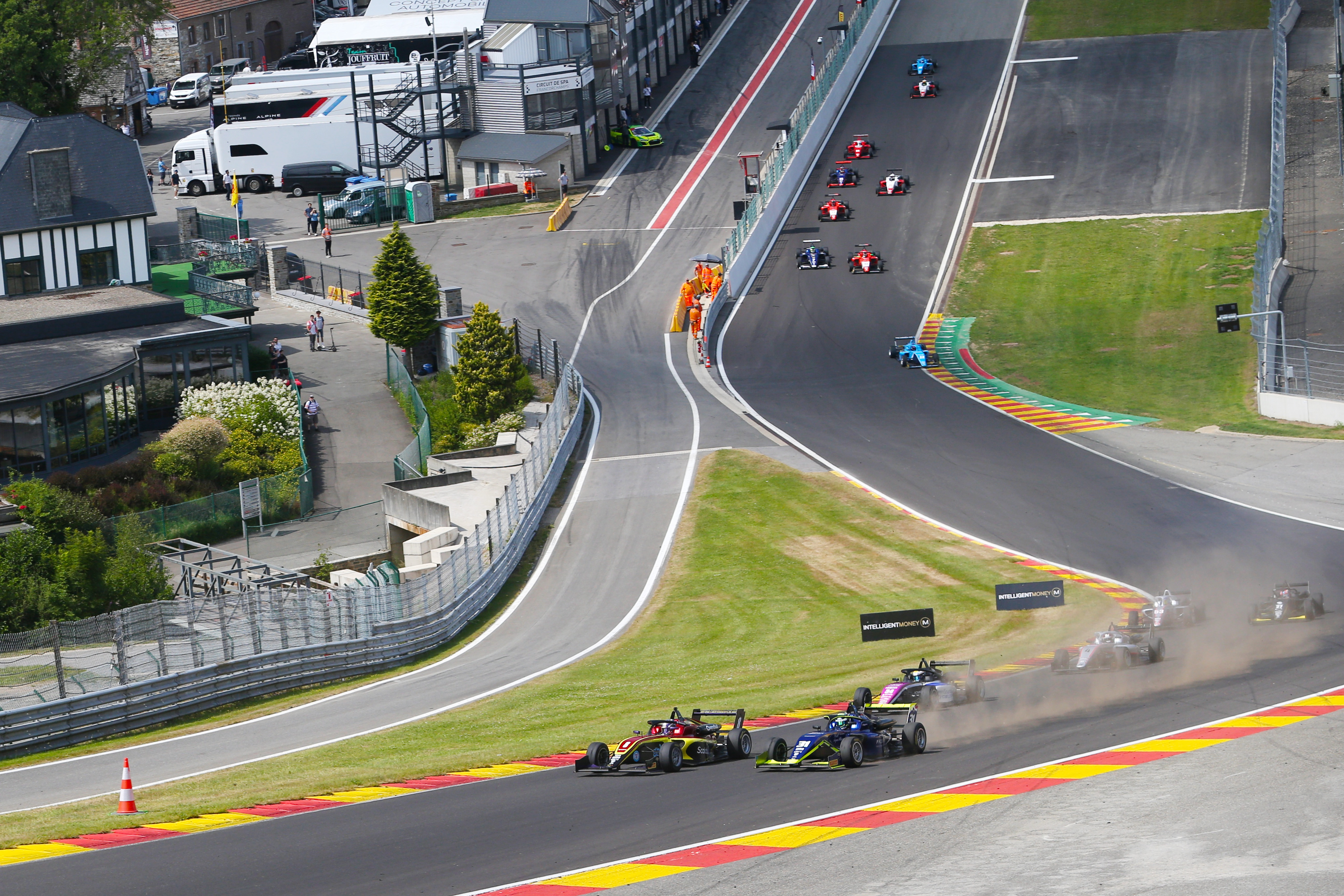
Cresswell on Eau Rouge during the 2022 GB3 Championship. at Spa Francorchamps

For 2022, Cresswell switched teams to Chris Dittmann Racing to compete in the GB3 Championship.

The season started with fourth place at Oulton Park over the Easter Weekend. A series of disappointing qualifying sessions was brought to an end with sixth on the grid at Spa Francorchamps, where the highlight of the season followed in race 2. Despite an incident on lap 1, which left Cresswell in ninth position, he recovered to finish fourth. on the road which became third after penalties were applied. The subsequent event at Silverstone saw Cresswell have another lap 1 incident in race 2 which resulted in the car rolling twice at Abbey curve. Cresswell was uninjured but was unable to continue for the weekend and did not start race 3.

==== 2023 ====
For the 2023 season, Cresswell remained in the GB3 Championship, largely due to the increase in the minimum weight of the car but switched teams to Elite Motorsport. The season started with a disastrous weekend, triggered by a mechanical failure in qualifying, at Oulton Park. With only four points from all three races Cresswell finished the weekend last in the Championship. Thereafter Cresswell rose to finally finish fourth, thanks to consistent performance and a late season podium run where he scored more points that anyone else.

==== 2024 ====
Cresswell opted to remain with Elite Motorsport for a third GB3 season in 2024. Budget issues prevented a move into FIA F3.

=== FIA Formula 3 Championship ===
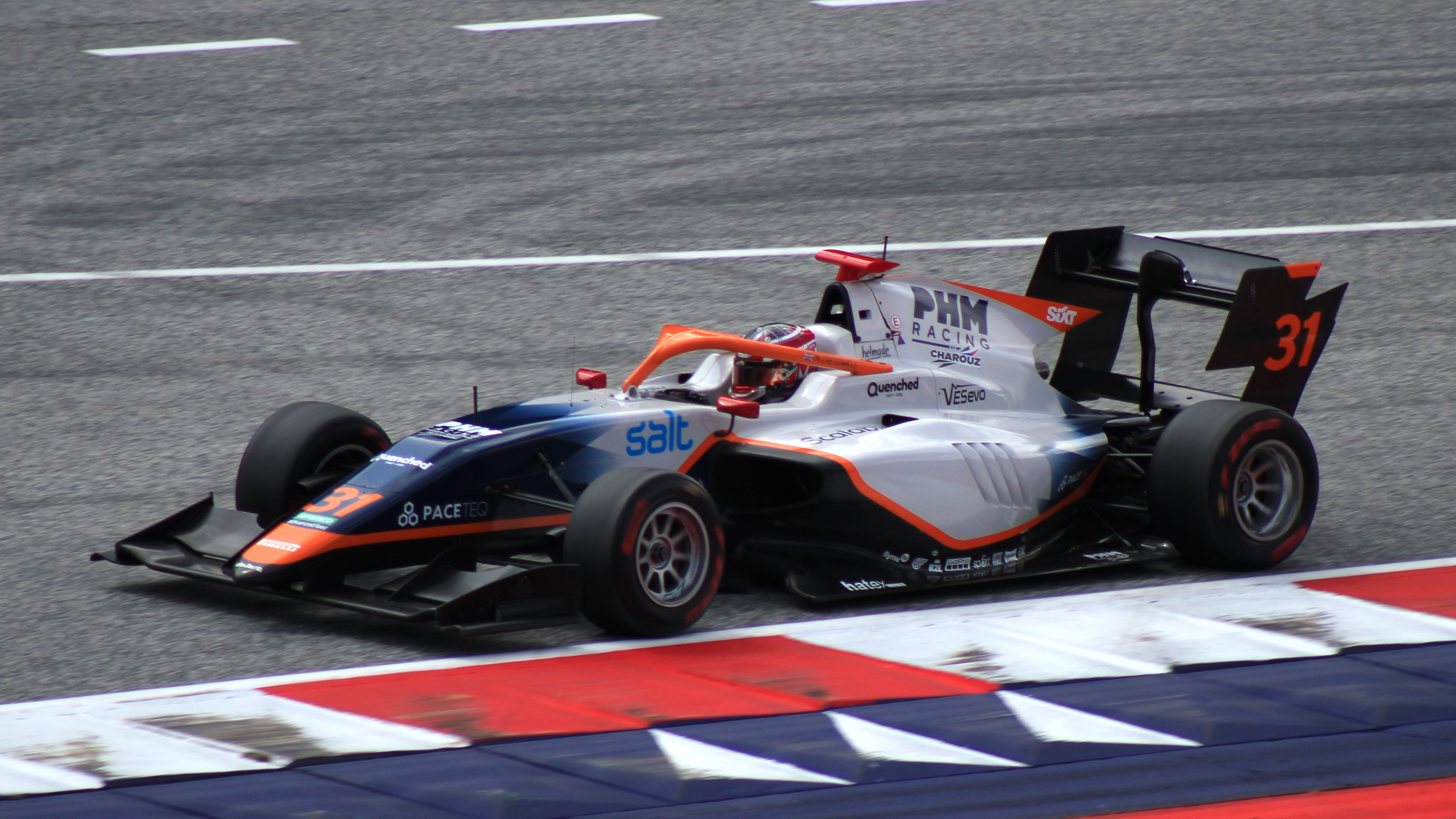
Cresswell driving for PHM Racing by Charouz at the 2023 Spielberg Formula 3 round.

Cresswell was drafted in to replace Piotr Wiśnicki at PHM Racing by Charouz during the 2023 FIA Formula 3 Championship, for the Austrian and Silverstone rounds. He achieved a best finish of 17th in his second race at Austria, which at that time lifted him ahead of teammates Wiśnicki and Roberto Faria in the standings. Cresswell returned to his main GB3 campaign and was replaced by Michael Shin for the final three rounds.

=== GT4 ===
==== 2025 ====
Due the rising costs of single seater racing and desire to move into sports car racing, Cresswell switched to GT4 with Elite Motorsport at the beginning of 2025. Initially for the first two rounds of the GT4 Winter Series alongside Josh Rattican.

Cresswell elected to continue participation in the Championship after the success of the first two rounds. He partnered with Tom Lebbon for the remaining three events.

In the final race weekend in Barcelona, Cresswell needed only to finish seventh in his individual race to win the championship. Taking a conservative approach, he finished fourth. The championship was awarded to him individually as he has partnered with both Josh Rattican and Tom Lebbon during the series.

On 3 April, the organizers of GT4 European Series announced Cresswell would be contesting the championship with Elite alongside Josh Rattican following the performance in the Winter Series.

==== 2026 ====
Cresswell returned to GT4 European Series with Elite Motorsport for the 2026 season partnering Charlie Hart. This announcement was made shortly after Elite Motorsport partnered with McLaren to for the McLaren Elite Talent Pathway, aimed at tapping into Elite's history of nurturing young drivers into GT racing.

=== GT3 ===
==== 2025 ====
2 Seas Motorsport participated in the Barcelona round of the GTOpen Championship and drafted Cresswell into partner Charles Dawson in the ProAm category.

==== 2026 ====
Greystone GT announced Cresswell would be running in their second pro car at the Spa 500 International GT Open event.

== Personal life ==
Cresswell was born in Kingston upon Thames, but moved to Austin, Texas when he was four years old. Returning to the UK just before his 12th birthday, Cresswell lives in Weybridge, Surrey.

Alongside his racing commitments, Cresswell studies Motorsports Engineering at Oxford Brookes University as of 2025.

== Karting record ==
=== Karting career summary ===
Season	Series	Team	Position
2019	British Kart Championship - Rotax Junior	DSM-Sport	32nd
2019	IAME Winter Cup - X30 Junior	MLR	
2020	Rotax Max Euro Winter Cup - Junior		
2020	Rotax Max Euro Trophy - Junior Max	DSM Msport	31st

== Racing record ==
=== Racing career summary ===
Season	Series	Team	Races	Wins	Poles	F/Laps	Podiums	Points	Position
2021	F4 British Championship	JHR Developments	29	6	4	6	11	305	**3rd**
2022	GB3 Championship	Chris Dittmann Racing	23	0	0	0	1	221	11th
2023	GB3 Championship	Elite Motorsport	23	1	1	2	8	390	4th
2023	FIA Formula 3 Championship	PHM Racing by Charouz	4	0	0	0	0	0	33rd
2024	GB3 Championship	Elite Motorsport	23	2	3	1	8	376	4th
2025	GT4 Winter Series	Elite Motorsport	15	6	6	4	14	303	**1st**
2025	GT4 European Series - Silver	Elite Motorsport with Entire Race Engineering	12	1	3	0	3	106	5th
2025	International GT Open	2 Seas Motorsport	2	0	0	0	0	0	47th
2025	International GT Open - Pro-Am	2 Seas Motorsport	2	0	0	0	1	10	19th
2026	GT4 Winter Series	Elite Motorsport	2	1	1	0	0	50	14th
2026	GT4 European Series - Silver	Elite Motorsport with Entire Racing Engineering	12	3	3	0	3	145	**1st**
2026	International GT Open	Greystone GT	5	0	0	1	1	44	10th

^{*} Season still in progress.

=== Complete F4 British Championship results ===
(key) (Races in bold indicate pole position) (Races in italics indicate fastest lap)

Year	Team	1	2	3	4	5	6	7	8	9	10	11	12	13	14	15	16	17	18	19	20	21	22	23	24	25	26	27	28	29	30	DC	Points
2021	JHR Developments	THR; 1; 9	THR; 2; 7	THR; 3; 2	SNE; 1; 3	SNE; 2; 14	SNE; 3; 3	BHI; 1; 10^{8}	BHI; 2; 6	**BHI**; **3**; 2	OUL; 1; 13	OUL; 2; 1^{4}	OUL; 3; 14	KNO; 1; 8	KNO; 2; 1^{3}	KNO; 3; 9	THR; 1; 4	THR; 2 Ret	THR; 3 WD	**CRO**; **1**; 1	CRO; 2 Ret	**CRO**; **3**; 1	SIL; 1; 5	SIL; 2; 8^{6}	SIL; 3; 9	DON; 1; 2	DON; 2; 12^{3}	DON; 3; 4	BHGP; 1; 1	BHGP; 2; 10^{6}	**BHGP**; **3**; 1	3rd	305

=== Complete GB3 Championship results ===
(key) (Races in bold indicate pole position) (Races in italics indicate fastest lap)

Year	Team	1	2	3	4	5	6	7	8	9	10	11	12	13	14	15	16	17	18	19	20	21	22	23	24	DC	Points
2022	Chris Dittmann Racing	OUL; 1; 4	OUL; 2; 7	OUL; 3; 10^{3}	SIL; 1; 9	SIL; 2 Ret	SIL; 3; 6^{6}	DON; 1; 7	DON; 2; 12	DON; 3; 16	SNE; 1; 9	SNE; 2; 16	SNE; 3; 5^{4}	SPA; 1; 18	SPA; 2; 3	SPA; 3; 20	SIL; 1; 11	SIL; 2 Ret	SIL; 3 DNS	BHGP; 1; 16	BHGP; 2; 12	BHGP; 3; 7	DON; 1 Ret	DON; 2; 4	DON; 3; 8^{1}	11th	221
2023	Elite Motorsport	OUL; 1; 20	OUL; 2; 18	OUL; 3 Ret	SIL1; 1; 5	SIL1; 2; 2	SIL1; 3; 5^{8}	SPA; 1; 7	SPA; 2; 3	SPA; 3; 11^{12}	SNE; 1; 9	SNE; 2; 5	SNE; 3 Ret	SIL2; 1; 2	SIL2; 2; 1	SIL2; 3 C	BHGP; 1; 3	BHGP; 2; 3	BHGP; 3; 16^{6}	ZAN; 1; 2	**ZAN**; **2**; 2	ZAN; 3; 11^{12}	DON; 1 Ret	DON; 2; 5	DON; 3; 6^{10}	4th	390
2024	Elite Motorsport	OUL; 1; 5	OUL; 2; 3	OUL; 3; 8	SIL1; 1; 2	SIL1; 2; 4	SIL1; 3 C	SPA; 1; 7	SPA; 2 Ret	SPA; 3; 6^{1}	HUN; 1; 6	HUN; 2; 3	HUN; 3; 9	ZAN; 1 Ret	ZAN; 2; 3	ZAN; 3; 2^{3}	**SIL2**; **1**; 7	**SIL2**; **2**; 1	SIL2; 3; 11^{1}	DON; 1; 10	DON; 2; 10	DON; 3; 2	**BRH**; **1**; 1	BRH; 2; 4	BRH; 3; 11^{1}	4th	376

=== Complete FIA Formula 3 Championship results ===
(key) (Races in bold indicate pole position) (Races in italics indicate fastest lap)

Year	Entrant	1	2	3	4	5	6	7	8	9	10	11	12	13	14	15	16	17	18	DC	Points
2023	PHM Racing by Charouz	BHR; SPR	BHR; FEA	MEL; SPR	MEL; FEA	MON; SPR	MON; FEA	CAT; SPR	CAT; FEA	RBR; SPR; 23	RBR; FEA; 17	SIL; SPR; 23	SIL; FEA; 22	HUN; SPR	HUN; FEA	SPA; SPR	SPA; FEA	MNZ; SPR	MNZ; FEA	33rd	0

=== Complete GT4 Winter Series results ===
(key) (Races in bold indicate pole position) (Races in italics indicate fastest lap)

Year	Entrant	Car	Class	1	2	3	4	5	6	7	8	9	10	11	12	13	14	15	DC	Points
2025	Elite Motorsport	McLaren Artura GT4	Pro	EST; 1; 1	EST; 2; 1	EST; 3; 1	**ALG**; **1**; 1	ALG; 2; 2	**ALG**; **3**; 2	CRT; 1; 2	CRT; 2; 3	CRT; 3; 2	**ARA**; **1**; 2	ARA; 2; 2	**ARA**; **3**; 1	CAT; 1; 2	CAT; 2; 4	**CAT**; **3**; 1	1st	303
2026	Elite Motorsport	McLaren Artura GT4	Pro	EST; 1	EST; 2	EST; 3	ALG; 1	ALG; 2	ALG; 3	CRT; 1	CRT; 2	CRT; 3	ARA; 1	ARA; 2	ARA; 3	CAT; 1; 1	CAT; 2 Ret	CAT; 3; 1	14th	50

=== Complete GT4 European Series results ===
(key) (Races in bold indicate pole position) (Races in italics indicate fastest lap)

Year	Team	Car	Class	1	2	3	4	5	6	7	8	9	10	11	12	Pos	Points
2025	Elite Motorsport with Entire Race Engineering	McLaren Artura GT4	Silver	LEC; 1; 4	LEC; 2; 36†	ZAN; 1; 6	ZAN; 2 Ret	**SPA**; **1**; 8	**SPA**; **2**; 2	**MIS**; **1**; 5	MIS; 2; 7	NÜR; 1; 1	NÜR; 2 Ret	CAT; 1; 12	CAT; 2; 2	5th	106
2026	Elite Motorsport with Entire Race Engineering	McLaren Artura GT4	Silver	LEC; 1; 23	LEC; 2; 8	MNZ; 1; 20	MNZ; 2; 6	**SPA**; **1**; 2	**SPA**; **2**; 2	MIS; 1; 1	MIS; 2 Ret	ZAN; 1; 1	**ZAN**; **2**; 1	ALG; 1 Ret	**ALG**; **2**; 2	1st	145

=== Complete International GT Open Results ===
(key) (Races in bold indicate pole position) (Races in italics indicate fastest lap)

Year	Team	Car	Class	1	2	3	4	5	6	7	8	9	10	11	12	13	14	Pos.	Points
2025	2 Seas Motorsport	Mercedes-AMG GT3 Evo	Pro-Am	ALG; 1	ALG; 2	SPA	HOC; 1	HOC; 2	HUN; 1	HUN; 2	LEC; 1	LEC; 2	RBR; 1	RBR; 2	CAT; 1; 5	CAT; 2; 3	MNZ	19th	10
2026	Greystone GT	McLaren 720S GT3 Evo	Pro	ALG; 1	ALG; 2	SPA; 1; 5	MIS; 1	MIS; 2	HUN; 1	HUN; 2	LEC; 1	LEC; 1	HOC; 1; 5	HOC; 2; 2	MNZ	CAT; 1; 5	CAT; 2; 4	10th	44

^{*} Season still in progress.
