= Vicinelli =

Vicinelli is an Italian surname, a diminutive of the surname Voisin. Notable people with the surname include:

- Odoardo Vicinelli (1684–1755), Italian painter
- Patrizia Vicinelli (1943–1991), Italian poet, writer, artist and actress
