= Lebbon =

Lebbon is a surname. Notable people with the surname include:

- Tim Lebbon (born 1969), British writer
- Tom Lebbon (born 2005), British racing driver
