= Voisin (surname) =

Voisin is a surname, and may refer to:

- André Voisin (1903–1964), French biochemist, farmer and author
- André Voisin (chess player) (fl.1928), French chess player
- Adrien Voisin (1890–1979), American sculptor
- Auguste Voisin
- Bailey Voisin (born 2003), British racing driver
- Benjamin Voisin (born 1996), French actor
- Callum Voisin (born 2006), British-Swiss racing driver
- Charles Voisin (1882–1912), French aviator
- Charles Voisin (governor) (1887–1942), Belgian lawyer and colonial administrator
- Charles-Joseph Voisin (1802–1872), Belgian Catholic priest and art historian
- Claire Voisin (born 1962), French mathematician
- Daisy Voisin (1924–1991), Trinidadian Parang singer
- Devin Voisin (born 2001), American football player
- Dexter R. Voisin (born 1963), American-Trinidadian social work scientist and author
- Félix Voisin (1794–1872), French psychiatrist
- François Philippe Voisin (1821–1918), French engineer
- Gabriel Voisin (1880–1973), French aviation pioneer, brother of Charles Voisin
- Gerald Voisin, Jersey politician
- Gérard Voisin (born 1945), French politician
- Jaden Voisin (born 2001), American football player
- Jean-Pierre Voisin (1932–2014), Swiss basketball player
- Lancelot Voisin de La Popelinière (1541–1608), French historian
- Maggie Voisin (born 1998), American freeskier
- Michel Voisin (born 1944), French politician
- Pierre Voisin (1910–1987), French journalist
- René Voisin (1893–1952), French trumpeter
- Roger Voisin (1918–2008), American trumpeter

== See also ==
- Roch Voisine (born 1963), Canadian singer-songwriter, actor, and radio and TV host
- Catherine Monvoisin, known as "La Voisin" (1640–1680), French sorceress during the reign of Louis XIV
- Marie Taglioni, Comtesse de Voisins (1804–1884), Swedish ballet dancer
