= Voisin =

Voisin (French for "neighbour") may refer to:

== Companies ==
- Avions Voisin, the French automobile company

- Voisin Laboratoire, a car manufactured by Avions Voisin

- Voisin (aircraft), the French aircraft manufacturer
- Voisin, a Lyon-based chocolatier, owned by the Boucaud family, which manufactures Coussin de Lyon

== Buildings ==
- Château de Voisins (Louveciennes), French palace

== People ==
- Voisin (surname)
