= 2020 Ginetta Junior Championship =

The 2020 Michelin Ginetta Junior Championship was a multi-event, one make motor racing championship held across England and Scotland. The championship featured a mix of professional teams and privately funded drivers, aged between 14 and 17, competing in Ginetta G40s that conformed to the technical regulations for the championship. It formed part of the extensive program of support categories built up around the British Touring Car Championship centrepiece. It was the fourteenth Ginetta Junior Championship, commencing on 1 August 2020 at Donington Park and concluding on 15 November 2020 at Brands Hatch, utilising the Grand Prix circuit. After nine meetings, all in support of the 2020 British Touring Car Championship, Tom Lebbon was crowned champion.

== Teams and drivers ==
Team	No.	Driver	Rounds
Total Control Racing	11	(United Kingdom) William Rochford	1–4, 6–8
Total Control Racing	52	(United Kingdom) Tom Edgar	All
Total Control Racing	95	(United Kingdom) Joe Warhurst	7–8
Preptech UK	12	(United Kingdom) James Higgins	5, 7–8
Elite Motorsport	14	(United Kingdom) Josh Miller	All
Elite Motorsport	16	(United Kingdom) William Aspin	All
Elite Motorsport	18	(United Kingdom) Seb Hopkins	All
Elite Motorsport	34	(United Kingdom) Tom Lebbon	All
Elite Motorsport	46	(United Kingdom) William Vincent	All
Elite Motorsport	77	(Spain) Tommy Pintos	All
Richardson Racing	19	(United Kingdom) Rowan Vincent	All
Richardson Racing	23	(United Kingdom) Georgi Dimitrov	All
Richardson Racing	41	(South Africa) Trennon Bettany	1–5, 7–8
R Racing	21	(United Kingdom) Josh Rattican	All
R Racing	22	(Switzerland) Bailey Voisin	All
R Racing	29	(United Kingdom) Joel Pearson	All
R Racing	62	(United Kingdom) Freddie Tomlinson	All
R Racing	70	(United Kingdom) Aston Millar	All
Team HARD	26	(United Kingdom) Luke Constantine	6
Privateer	30	(United Kingdom) Will Jenkins	All
Fox Motorsport	48	(United Kingdom) Liam McNeilly	All
Assetto Motorsport	88	(United Kingdom) Joe Wheeler	All
Alastair Rushforth Motorsport	99	(United Kingdom) Zak Taylor	1–6

== Race calendar ==
Round	Circuit	Date	Map of circuit locations
1	(United Kingdom) Donington Park, Leicestershire (National Circuit)	1–2 August	2020 Ginetta Junior Championship (the United Kingdom)
2	(United Kingdom) Brands Hatch, Kent (Grand Prix Circuit)	8–9 August	2020 Ginetta Junior Championship (the United Kingdom)
3	(United Kingdom) Knockhill Circuit, Fife	29–30 August	2020 Ginetta Junior Championship (the United Kingdom)
4	(United Kingdom) Thruxton Circuit, Hampshire	19–20 September	2020 Ginetta Junior Championship (the United Kingdom)
5	(United Kingdom) Silverstone, Northamptonshire (National Circuit)	26–27 September	2020 Ginetta Junior Championship (the United Kingdom)
6	(United Kingdom) Croft Circuit, North Yorkshire	10–11 October	2020 Ginetta Junior Championship (the United Kingdom)
7	(United Kingdom) Snetterton, Norfolk (300 Circuit)	24–25 October	2020 Ginetta Junior Championship (the United Kingdom)
8	(United Kingdom) Brands Hatch, Kent (Indy Circuit)	14–15 November	2020 Ginetta Junior Championship (the United Kingdom)

Calendar Changes

The Ginetta Junior Championship will not support every round of the British Touring Car Championship in 2020. The series will miss the third round of the BTCC season, Oulton Park.

== Race results ==
Round	Circuit	Date	Pole position	Fastest lap	Winning driver	Winning team	Rookie Winner
1	Donington Park, Leicestershire (National Circuit)	1 August	(United Kingdom) Tom Lebbon	(United Kingdom) Joel Pearson	(Switzerland) Bailey Voisin	R Racing	(United Kingdom) Georgi Dimitrov
1	Donington Park, Leicestershire (National Circuit)	1 August	(United Kingdom) Tom Lebbon	(United Kingdom) Tom Lebbon	(United Kingdom) Georgi Dimitrov	Richardson Racing	(United Kingdom) Georgi Dimitrov
1	Donington Park, Leicestershire (National Circuit)	2 August		(United Kingdom) Aston Millar	(United Kingdom) Georgi Dimitrov	Richardson Racing	(United Kingdom) Georgi Dimitrov
2	Brands Hatch, Kent (GP Circuit)	8 August	(United Kingdom) Tom Lebbon	(Switzerland) Bailey Voisin	(Switzerland) Bailey Voisin	R Racing	(United Kingdom) Tom Lebbon
2	Brands Hatch, Kent (GP Circuit)	8 August	(Switzerland) Bailey Voisin	(United Kingdom) Zak Taylor	(Switzerland) Bailey Voisin	R Racing	(United Kingdom) Tom Lebbon
2	Brands Hatch, Kent (GP Circuit)	9 August		(Switzerland) Bailey Voisin	(United Kingdom) Tom Lebbon	Elite Motorsport	(United Kingdom) Tom Lebbon
3	Knockhill Circuit, Fife	29 August	(Switzerland) Bailey Voisin	(Switzerland) Bailey Voisin	(Switzerland) Bailey Voisin	R Racing	(United Kingdom) Tom Lebbon
3	Knockhill Circuit, Fife	30 August	(United Kingdom) Georgi Dimitrov	(Switzerland) Bailey Voisin	(United Kingdom) Georgi Dimitrov	Richardson Racing	(United Kingdom) Georgi Dimitrov
3	Knockhill Circuit, Fife	30 August		(Switzerland) Bailey Voisin	(United Kingdom) Josh Rattican	R Racing	(United Kingdom) Tom Lebbon
4	Thruxton Circuit, Hampshire	19 September	(United Kingdom) Tom Lebbon	(United Kingdom) Freddie Tomlinson	(Switzerland) Bailey Voisin	R Racing	(United Kingdom) Tom Lebbon
4	Thruxton Circuit, Hampshire	20 September	(United Kingdom) Tom Lebbon	(United Kingdom) Tom Lebbon	(United Kingdom) Josh Rattican	R Racing	(United Kingdom) Tom Lebbon
5	Silverstone Circuit, Northamptonshire (National Circuit)	26 September	(Switzerland) Bailey Voisin	(Switzerland) Bailey Voisin	(Switzerland) Bailey Voisin	R Racing	(United Kingdom) William Vincent
5	Silverstone Circuit, Northamptonshire (National Circuit)	27 September	(Switzerland) Bailey Voisin	(United Kingdom) Seb Hopkins	(United Kingdom) Georgi Dimitrov	Richardson Racing	(United Kingdom) Georgi Dimitrov
5	Silverstone Circuit, Northamptonshire (National Circuit)	27 September		(United Kingdom) Tom Edgar	(Switzerland) Bailey Voisin	R Racing	(United Kingdom) Georgi Dimitrov
6	Croft Circuit, North Yorkshire	10 October	(United Kingdom) Tom Lebbon	(United Kingdom) Josh Rattican	(United Kingdom) Josh Rattican	Elite Racing	(United Kingdom) Tom Lebbon
6	Croft Circuit, North Yorkshire	11 October	(United Kingdom) Tom Lebbon	(United Kingdom) Josh Rattican	(United Kingdom) Tom Lebbon	Elite Motorsport	(United Kingdom) Tom Lebbon
7	Snetterton Circuit, Norfolk (300 Circuit)	24 October	(Switzerland) Bailey Voisin	(Switzerland) Bailey Voisin	(United Kingdom) Tom Lebbon	Elite Motorsport	(United Kingdom) Tom Lebbon
7	Snetterton Circuit, Norfolk (300 Circuit)	24 October	(Switzerland) Bailey Voisin	(Switzerland) Bailey Voisin	(United Kingdom) Tom Lebbon	Elite Motorsport	(United Kingdom) Tom Lebbon
7	Snetterton Circuit, Norfolk (300 Circuit)	25 October		(United Kingdom) Joel Pearson	(United Kingdom) Tom Lebbon	Elite Motorsport	(United Kingdom) Tom Lebbon
8	Brands Hatch, Kent (Indy Circuit)	14 November	(United Kingdom) Josh Miller	(United Kingdom) Tom Edgar	(United Kingdom) Josh Rattican	Elite Racing	(United Kingdom) Tom Lebbon
8	Brands Hatch, Kent (Indy Circuit)	15 November	(United Kingdom) Josh Miller	(Switzerland) Bailey Voisin	(United Kingdom) Josh Miller	Elite Motorsport	(United Kingdom) Josh Miller

== Championship standings ==
Points system
1st	2nd	3rd	4th	5th	6th	7th	8th	9th	10th	11th	12th	13th	14th	15th	16th	17th	18th	19th	20th	R1 PP	FL
35	30	26	22	20	18	16	14	12	11	10	9	8	7	6	5	4	3	2	1	1	1

=== Drivers' championship ===
- A driver's best 19 scores counted towards the championship, with any other points being discarded.

Pos	Driver	DON			BHGP			KNO			THR		SIL			CRO		SNE			BHI		Points
1	(United Kingdom) Tom Lebbon (R)	5	2	9	2	3	1	2	3	2	3	2	11	Ret	(13)	2	1	1	1	1	2	2	528
2	(United Kingdom) Josh Rattican	3	4	(15)	3	2	3	5	2	1	2	1	2	3	4	1	3	21	4	2	1	3	519
3	(Switzerland) Bailey Voisin	1	19	6	1	1	2	1	5	3	1	Ret	1	2	1	10	Ret	2	2	3	8	4	516
4	(United Kingdom) Georgi Dimitrov (R)	2	1	1	5	9	8	6	1	7	12	Ret	Ret	1	3	15	11	3	7	12	7	6	386
5	(United Kingdom) Seb Hopkins (R)	Ret	7	11	9	6	6	10	9	(20)	5	8	4	6	7	9	10	5	5	6	3	5	320
6	(United Kingdom) Tom Edgar (R)	8	(13)	8	12	11	7	4	Ret	11	8	4	8	5	2	3	6	7	9	7	6	7	304
7	(Spain) Tommy Pintos (R)	(12)	11	4	8	7	10	11	10	10	(19)	7	10	10	11	8	10	4	3	5	Ret	8	269
8	(United Kingdom) Joel Pearson	4	5	2	10	17	Ret	3	6	6	4	9	18	Ret	Ret	7	4	14	8	4	11	9	267
9	(United Kingdom) Freddie Tomlinson	13	8	7	7	5	5	7	Ret	13	10	5	12	Ret	10	6	2	13	(16)	8	9	14	249
10	(United Kingdom) Aston Millar (R)	7	3	5	11	16	Ret	(19)	3	5	9	10	9	7	6	12	18	10	10	13	7	16	240
11	(United Kingdom) Josh Miller (R)	9	10	Ret	14	10	13	9	14	9	7	3	6	Ret	14	Ret	8	15	11	17	4	1	239
12	(United Kingdom) William Vincent (R)	6	Ret	(17)	6	13	9	17	17	17	15	6	3	4	5	4	17	17	17	10	12	Ret	209
13	(United Kingdom) Zak Taylor (R)	10	6	3	4	4	4	12	8	12	6	Ret	5	8	8	18	12						202
14	(United Kingdom) Will Jenkins (R)	11	16	13	16	Ret	Ret	Ret	7	4	11	12	15	9	15	5	5	6	13	9	10	Ret	198
15	(United Kingdom) William Aspin (R)	18	9	10	13	8	Ret	15	15	19	14	11	7	Ret	16	13	9	8	6	21	Ret	15	158
16	(United Kingdom) Liam McNeilly (R)	14	14	12	15	19	11	8	13	8	17	Ret	14	13	Ret	16	13	11	14	11	Ret	Ret	136
17	(United Kingdom) Joe Wheeler (R)	17	18	16	19	12	14	13	16	16	18	13	17	Ret	18	11	14	9	(20)	15	15	12	107
18	(United Kingdom) Rowan Vincent (R)	16	12	18	17	14	12	16	18	15	20	Ret	13	12	17	Ret	15	19	18	18	17	Ret	91
19	(South Africa) Trennon Bettany (R)	19	17	14	18	15	15	14	11	14	16	Ret	16	11	9			18	12	20	Ret	Ret	88
20	(United Kingdom) William Rochford	15	15	Ret	Ret	18	16	18	12	18	13	Ret				14	19	16	15	16	13	11	77
21	(United Kingdom) James Higgins (R)												19	Ret	12			12	19	14	16	10	45
22	(United Kingdom) Joe Warhurst (R)																	20	21	19	14	13	18
23	(United Kingdom) Luke Constantine (R)															17	16						9
