= Bailey Voisin =

British racing driver (born 2003)

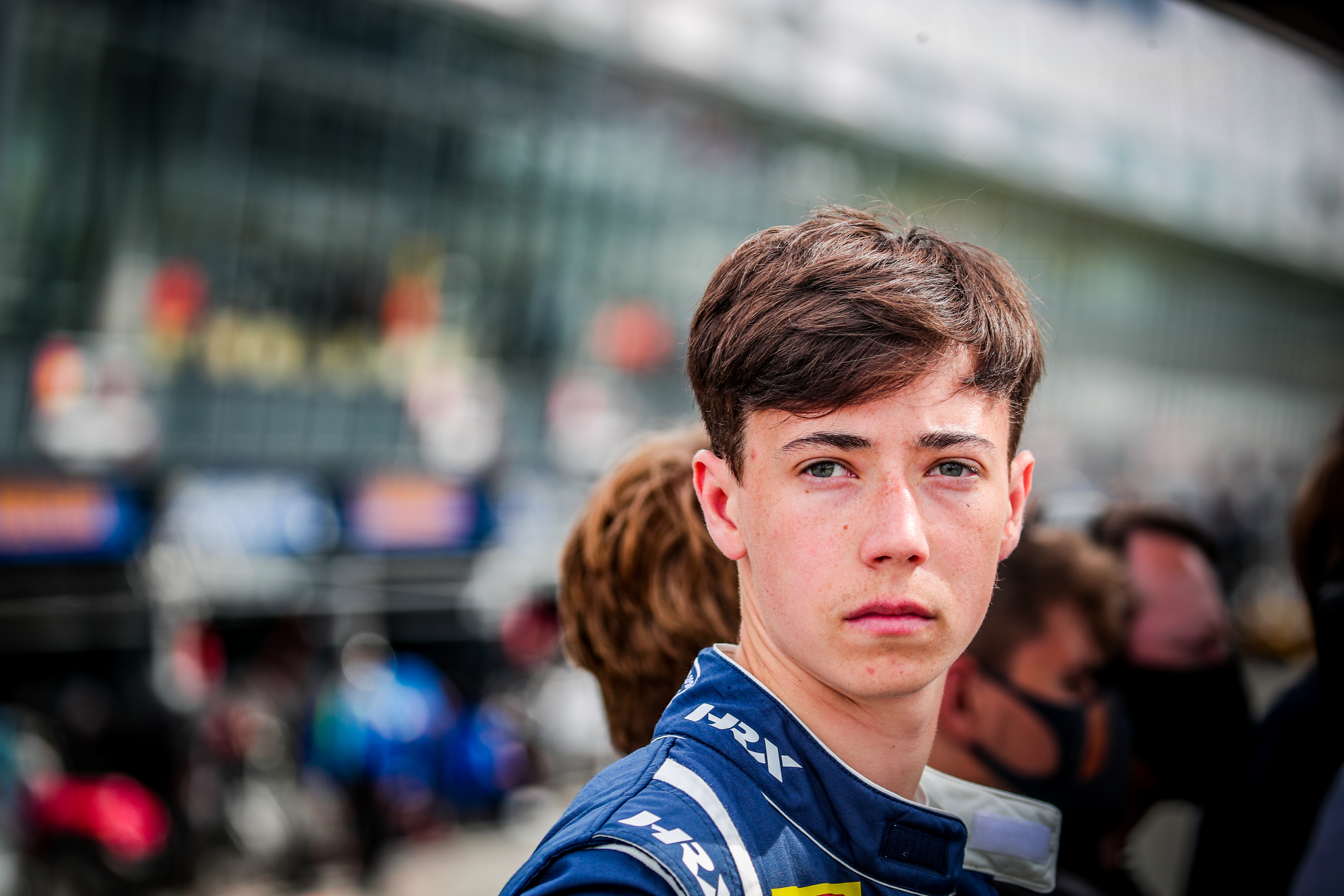
- Bailey Voisin at the GT4 European Series Zandvoort round in 2021
- Nationality: (United Kingdom) British (Switzerland) Swiss via double nationality
- Born: Bailey Dominic George Voisin; 20 February 2003 (age 23) Geneva, Switzerland
- Relatives: Callum Voisin (brother)

European Le Mans Series career
- Debut season: 2022
- Current team: Inter Europol Competition
- Categorisation: FIA Silver
- Car number: 2
- Starts: 6 (6 entries)
- Wins: 0
- Podiums: 2
- Poles: 0
- Fastest laps: 0
- Best finish: 8th (LMP3) in 2022

Previous series
- 2021 2019–2020: GT4 European Series; Ginetta Junior Championship

Championship titles
- 2021: GT4 European Series

Bailey Dominic George Voisin (born 20 February 2003) is a British-Swiss racing driver currently competing in the European Le Mans Series with United Autosports. He is a champion of the GT4 European Series, having won the title alongside Charlie Fagg in 2021.

== Career ==
=== Ginetta Junior ===
Voisin made his car racing debut, competing for Douglas Motorsport in the Ginetta Junior Championship. His season proved to be a challenge, as the Swiss driver ended up 13th overall, having scored a best race finish of seventh at Thruxton.

The following season, Voisin returned to the Ginetta Junior series, this time driving for R Racing. The start of the campaign brought immediate success, with Voisin winning the season opener in Donington and taking a pair of victories, as well as a podium, during round two at Brands Hatch. More wins at Knockhill and Thruxton elevated Voisin into the title battle, before he claimed another double, this time at Silverstone. Despite a triple of podiums at the penultimate round, Voisin would miss out on the title at Brands Hatch, ending up third, a mere twelve points behind championship winner Tom Lebbon.

=== GT4 European Series ===
In 2021, it was announced that Voisin would be making a switch to the GT4 European Series, pairing up with Charlie Fagg at United Autosports. At the season opener in Monza, Voisin and Fagg took a pair of victories, surging into the lead of the championship. A podium at Paul Ricard followed before a pair of points finishes came in Zandvoort, which put the team behind the Nr.8 CMR entry in the standings. This would not deter the British pairing, who bounced back with pole position and a race win in Belgium, as well as two podiums at the Nürburgring. Voisin, along with Fagg, clinched the title at the final round in Barcelona, having finished Race 1 in fifth place, thus creating an unreachable lead in the overall championship.

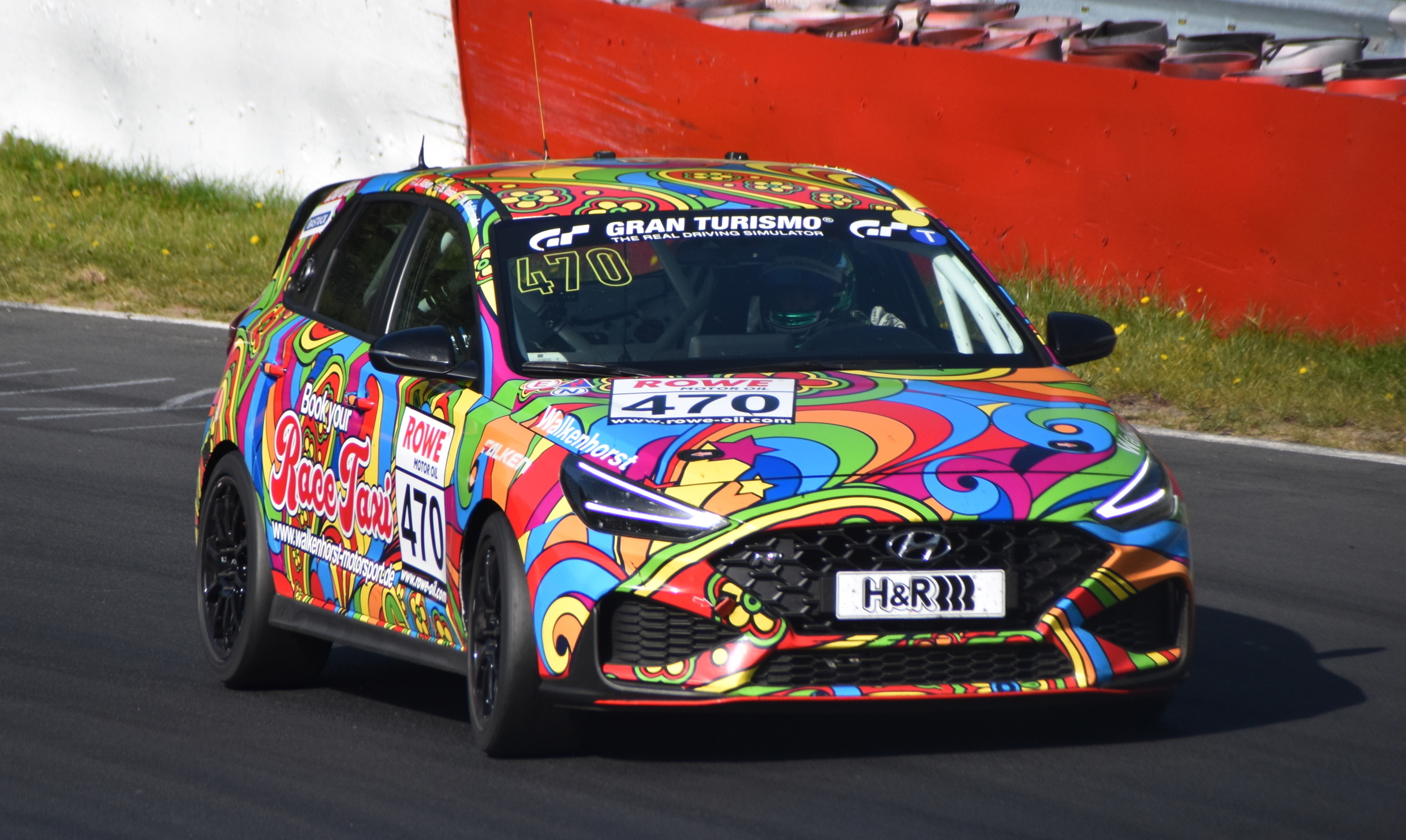
Bailey Voisin driving a Hyundai i30N at the 2023 Nürburgring Endurance Series

=== European Le Mans Series ===
Voisin progressed to the European Le Mans Series in 2022, returning to United Autosports, with whom he would compete in the LMP3 category alongside Josh Caygill and Finn Gehrsitz. Their season started in strong fashion, as the team finished third at Le Castellet, which turned into second once a car ahead had been disqualified. However, the outfit were unable to match that result for the following four rounds, with two retirements sandwiching a pair of points finishes. The season ended positively, with Voisin, Gehrsitz and Caygill taking another second place in the Algarve, which elevated them to eighth in the championship.

== Racing record ==
=== Racing career summary ===
Season	Series	Team	Races	Wins	Poles	F/Laps	Podiums	Points	Position
2019	Ginetta Junior Championship	Douglas Motorsport	23	0	0	0	0	161	13th
2019	Ginetta Junior Winter Championship	R Racing	4	0	0	0	1	0	NC†
2020	Ginetta Junior Championship	R Racing	21	7	7	9	13	516	**3rd**
2021	GT4 European Series - Silver	United Autosports	12	3	2	1	6	191	**1st**
2022	European Le Mans Series - LMP3	United Autosports	6	0	0	0	2	48	8th
2023	GT4 European Series - Silver	GPA Racing	8	0	0	0	0	2*	29th*
2023	GT World Challenge Europe Endurance Cup	Walkenhorst Motorsport	1	0	0	0	0	0	NC
2024	European Le Mans Series - LMP3	RLR MSport	6	0	0	0	0	21	13th

^{†} As Voisin was a guest driver, he was ineligible to score points.^{*} Season still in progress.

=== Complete GT4 European Series results ===
(key) (Races in bold indicate pole position; results in italics indicate fastest lap)

Year	Entrant	Class	Chassis	1	2	3	4	5	6	7	8	9	10	11	12	Rank	Points
2021	United Autosports	Silver Cup	McLaren 570S GT4	MNZ; 1; 1	MNZ; 2; 1	LEC; 1; 3	LEC; 2; 6	ZAN; 1; 10	ZAN; 2; 7	**SPA**; **1**; 1	SPA; 2; 4	**NÜR**; **1**; 2	NÜR; 2; 2	CAT; 1; 10	CAT; 2; 10	1st	191

=== Complete European Le Mans Series results ===
Year	Team	Class	Car	Engine	1	2	3	4	5	6	Rank	Points
2022	United Autosports	LMP3	Ligier JS P320	Nissan VK56DE 5.6L V8	LEC; 2	IMO; Ret	MNZ; 5	CAT; 9	SPA; Ret	ALG; 2	8th	48
2024	RLR MSport	LMP3	Ligier JS P320	Nissan VK56DE 5.6L V8	CAT; Ret	LEC; 8	IMO; 7	SPA; 10	MUG; 8	ALG; 7	13th	21
