= 2023 Spielberg Formula 3 round =

Motor racing event

(Austria) 2023 Spielberg Formula 3 round
Round details
- Round 5 of 9 in the 2023 FIA Formula 3 Championship.
- Location: Red Bull Ring, Spielberg, Styria, Austria
- Course: Permanent racing facility 4.318 km (2.683 mi)

Sprint Race
- Date: 1 July 2023
- Laps: 20
Podium
First	(Estonia) Paul Aron	Prema Racing
Second	(Italy) Gabriele Minì	Hitech Pulse-Eight
Third	(Brazil) Caio Collet	Van Amersfoort Racing
Fastest lap
Driver	(Estonia) Paul Aron	Prema Racing
- Time: 1:33.061 (on lap 19)

Feature Race
- Date: 2 July 2023
- Laps: 26
Pole position
Driver	(Switzerland) Grégoire Saucy	ART Grand Prix
Time	1:20.457	
Podium
First	(United Kingdom) Zak O'Sullivan	Prema Racing
Second	(Brazil) Gabriel Bortoleto	Trident
Third	(Brazil) Caio Collet	Van Amersfoort Racing
Fastest lap
Driver	(Sweden) Dino Beganovic	Prema Racing
- Time: 1:22.774 (on lap 7)

The 2023 Spielberg Formula 3 round was a motor racing event held between 30 June and 2 July at the Red Bull Ring. It was the fifth round of the 2023 FIA Formula 3 Championship and was held in support of the 2023 Austrian Grand Prix.

== Background ==
=== Driver changes ===
GB3 racer McKenzy Cresswell took over Piotr Wiśnicki's seat at PHM Racing by Charouz for this round and the following Silverstone round.

== Classification ==
=== Qualifying ===
Pos.	No.	Driver	Team	Time/Gap	Grid SR	Grid FR
1	8	(Switzerland) Grégoire Saucy	ART Grand Prix	1:20.457	12	1
2	2	(Sweden) Dino Beganovic	Prema Racing	+0.004	11	2
3	5	(Brazil) Gabriel Bortoleto	Trident	+0.017	9	3
4	1	(Estonia) Paul Aron	Prema Racing	+0.064	8	4
5	17	(Brazil) Caio Collet	Van Amersfoort Racing	+0.090	7	5
6	3	(United Kingdom) Zak O'Sullivan	Prema Racing	+0.109	10^{1}	6
7	10	(Argentina) Franco Colapinto	MP Motorsport	+0.147	5	7
8	6	(Germany) Oliver Goethe	Trident	+0.185	4	8
9	7	(United States) Kaylen Frederick	ART Grand Prix	+0.196	3	9
10	24	(United Kingdom) Christian Mansell (Note: Mansell is an Australian driver competing under a British licence.)	Campos Racing	+0.287	6^{2}	10
11	15	(Italy) Gabriele Minì	Hitech Pulse-Eight	+0.341	2	11
12	23	(Spain) Pepe Martí	Campos Racing	+0.362	1	12
13	11	(Spain) Mari Boya	MP Motorsport	+0.367	13	13
14	16	(United Kingdom) Luke Browning	Hitech Pulse-Eight	+0.523	14	14
15	14	(Colombia) Sebastián Montoya	Hitech Pulse-Eight	+0.527	15	15
16	12	(United Kingdom) Jonny Edgar	MP Motorsport	+0.615	16	16
17	9	(Bulgaria) Nikola Tsolov	ART Grand Prix	+0.626	17	17
18	27	(United Kingdom) Taylor Barnard	Jenzer Motorsport	+0.670	18	18
19	25	(Australia) Hugh Barter	Campos Racing	+0.685	19	19
20	20	(United Kingdom) Oliver Gray	Rodin Carlin	+0.750	20	25^{3}
21	29	(Germany) Sophia Flörsch	PHM Racing by Charouz	+0.810	21	20
22	26	(Italy) Nikita Bedrin (Note: Bedrin is a Russian driver competing under an Italian licence.)	Jenzer Motorsport	+0.863	22	21
23	31	(United Kingdom) McKenzy Cresswell	PHM Racing by Charouz	+0.905	23	22
24	21	(United States) Hunter Yeany	Rodin Carlin	+1.052	29^{4}	23
25	22	(Israel) Ido Cohen	Rodin Carlin	+1.061	24	24
26	18	(Mexico) Rafael Villagómez	Van Amersfoort Racing	+1.063	25	26
27	28	(Mexico) Alex García	Jenzer Motorsport	+1.477	26	27
28	19	(Australia) Tommy Smith	Van Amersfoort Racing	+1.805	27	28
29	30	(Brazil) Roberto Faria	PHM Racing by Charouz	+1.918	28	29
107% time: 1:26.089 (+5.632)
—	4	(Italy) Leonardo Fornaroli	Trident	+25.983	30	30

Notes

- ^1 – Zak O'Sullivan originally qualified seventh, but received a three-place grid drop for the sprint race due to impeding Tommy Smith.
- ^2 – Christian Mansell originally qualified third, but due to crossing the white line at pit entry, he was given a three-place grid drop for the sprint race.
- ^3 - Oliver Gray was given a five-place grid drop for the feature race due to causing a collision with Rafael Villagómez in the sprint race.
- ^4 - Hunter Yeany received a five-place grid drop for the sprint race due to causing a collision with Rafael Villagómez at the Barcelona feature race.

=== Sprint race ===
Pos.	No.	Driver	Team	Laps	Time/Gap	Grid	Pts.
1	1	(Estonia) Paul Aron	Prema Racing	20	33:18.970	8	10 (1)
2	15	(Italy) Gabriele Minì	Hitech Pulse-Eight	20	+1.469	2	9
3	17	(Brazil) Caio Collet	Van Amersfoort Racing	20	+4.978	7	8
4	3	(United Kingdom) Zak O'Sullivan	Prema Racing	20	+5.486	10	7
5	12	(United Kingdom) Jonny Edgar	MP Motorsport	20	+6.372	16	6
6	23	(Spain) Pepe Martí	Campos Racing	20	+7.651	1	5
7	7	(United States) Kaylen Frederick	ART Grand Prix	20	+8.332	3	4
8	2	(Sweden) Dino Beganovic	Prema Racing	20	+8.490	11	3
9	14	(Colombia) Sebastián Montoya	Hitech Pulse-Eight	20	+9.679	15	2
10	5	(Brazil) Gabriel Bortoleto	Trident	20	+10.157	9	1
11	16	(United Kingdom) Luke Browning	Hitech Pulse-Eight	20	+10.985	14	
12	11	(Spain) Mari Boya	MP Motorsport	20	+11.343	13	
13	10	(Argentina) Franco Colapinto	MP Motorsport	20	+12.311	5	
14	24	(United Kingdom) Christian Mansell	Campos Racing	20	+14.374	6	
15	4	(Italy) Leonardo Fornaroli	Trident	20	+15.175	30	
16	9	(Bulgaria) Nikola Tsolov	ART Grand Prix	20	+16.057	17	
17	22	(Israel) Ido Cohen	Rodin Carlin	20	+17.620	24	
18	29	(Germany) Sophia Flörsch	PHM Racing by Charouz	20	+18.265	21	
19	21	(United States) Hunter Yeany	Rodin Carlin	20	+18.507	29	
20	8	(Switzerland) Grégoire Saucy	ART Grand Prix	20	+19.415	12	
21	19	(Australia) Tommy Smith	Van Amersfoort Racing	20	+20.160	27	
22	25	(Australia) Hugh Barter	Campos Racing	20	+21.705	19	
23	31	(United Kingdom) McKenzy Cresswell	PHM Racing by Charouz	20	+22.749	23	
24	30	(Brazil) Roberto Faria	PHM Racing by Charouz	20	+25.292	28	
25	26	(Italy) Nikita Bedrin	Jenzer Motorsport	20	+26.873^{1}	22	
26	6	(Germany) Oliver Goethe	Trident	20	+1:28.610	4	
27	27	(United Kingdom) Taylor Barnard	Jenzer Motorsport	18	+2 laps	18	
DNF	20	(United Kingdom) Oliver Gray	Rodin Carlin	10	Collision	20	
DNF	18	(Mexico) Rafael Villagómez	Van Amersfoort Racing	10	Collision	25	
DNF	28	(Mexico) Alex García	Jenzer Motorsport	1	Retired	26	
Fastest lap set by (Estonia) Paul Aron: 1:33.061 (lap 19)

Notes

- ^1 – Nikita Bedrin originally finished seventeenth, but later received a ten-second time penalty for an incident with Leonardo Fornaroli, dropping him to down to twenty-fifth.

=== Feature race ===
Pos.	No.	Driver	Team	Laps	Time/Gap	Grid	Pts.
1	3	(United Kingdom) Zak O'Sullivan	Prema Racing	26	37:59.535	6	25
2	5	(Brazil) Gabriel Bortoleto	Trident	26	+0.844	3	18
3	17	(Brazil) Caio Collet	Van Amersfoort Racing	26	+1.696	5	15
4	10	(Argentina) Franco Colapinto	MP Motorsport	26	+2.458	7	12
5	2	(Sweden) Dino Beganovic	Prema Racing	26	+4.460	2	10 (1)
6	12	(United Kingdom) Jonny Edgar	MP Motorsport	26	+4.723	16	8
7	24	(United Kingdom) Christian Mansell	Campos Racing	26	+5.296	10	6
8	25	(Australia) Hugh Barter	Campos Racing	26	+5.676	19	4
9	23	(Spain) Pepe Martí	Campos Racing	26	+9.530	12	2
10	4	(Italy) Leonardo Fornaroli	Trident	26	+10.624	30	1
11	6	(Germany) Oliver Goethe	Trident	26	+12.441	8	
12	27	(United Kingdom) Taylor Barnard	Jenzer Motorsport	26	+13.883	18	
13	26	(Italy) Nikita Bedrin	Jenzer Motorsport	26	+14.601	PL	
14	20	(United Kingdom) Oliver Gray	Rodin Carlin	26	+15.148	25	
15	18	(Mexico) Rafael Villagómez	Van Amersfoort Racing	26	+15.803	26	
16	9	(Bulgaria) Nikola Tsolov	ART Grand Prix	26	+16.236	17	
17	31	(United Kingdom) McKenzy Cresswell	PHM Racing by Charouz	26	+16.584	22	
18	19	(Australia) Tommy Smith	Van Amersfoort Racing	26	+16.921	28	
19	30	(Brazil) Roberto Faria	PHM Racing by Charouz	26	+17.355	29	
20	14	(Colombia) Sebastián Montoya	Hitech Pulse-Eight	26	+18.814^{1}	15	
21	21	(United States) Hunter Yeany	Rodin Carlin	26	+23.510^{2}	23	
22	16	(United Kingdom) Luke Browning	Hitech Pulse-Eight	26	+38.170	14	
23	28	(Mexico) Alex García	Jenzer Motorsport	26	+53.151	PL	
24	11	(Spain) Mari Boya	MP Motorsport	26	+53.750	13	
25	1	(Estonia) Paul Aron	Prema Racing	26	+1:06.265	4	
26	7	(United States) Kaylen Frederick	ART Grand Prix	26	+1:07.566	9	
27	8	(Switzerland) Grégoire Saucy	ART Grand Prix	24	+2 laps	1	(2)
DNF	22	(Israel) Ido Cohen	Rodin Carlin	14	Retired	24	
DNF	15	(Italy) Gabriele Minì	Hitech Pulse-Eight	0	Collision	11	
DSQ	29	(Germany) Sophia Flörsch	PHM Racing by Charouz	26	Disqualified^{3}	20	
Fastest lap set by (Sweden) Dino Beganovic: 1:22.774 (lap 7)

Notes

- ^1 - Sebastián Montoya initially finished tenth, however, he was given a ten-second time penalty for causing a collision with Franco Colapinto, dropping him down to twentieth.
- ^2 - Hunter Yeany originally finished thirteenth but was handed a ten-second time penalty for unsafely rejoining the track, dropping him to twenty-first.
- ^3 – Sophia Flörsch was disqualified from the feature race after it was found that her car's front wing endplates were less than the required 70mm above the reference plane. As a result, Pepe Martí moved up to ninth while Leonardo Fornaroli was promoted to the final point scoring position.

== Standings after the event ==
Drivers' Championship standings

	Pos.	Driver	Points
	1	(Brazil) Gabriel Bortoleto	111
	2	(Spain) Pepe Martí	75
	3	(Sweden) Dino Beganovic	75
4	4	(United Kingdom) Zak O'Sullivan	73
1	5	(Italy) Gabriele Minì	65

Teams' Championship standings

Pos.	Team	Points
1	(Italy) Prema Racing	213
2	(Italy) Trident	171
3	(United Kingdom) Hitech Pulse-Eight	128
4	(Spain) Campos Racing	90
5	(Netherlands) MP Motorsport	88

- Note: Only the top five positions are included for both sets of standings.

== See also ==
- 2023 Austrian Grand Prix
- 2023 Spielberg Formula 2 round

== Notes ==
Previous round: 2023 Barcelona Formula 3 round	FIA Formula 3 Championship; 2023 season	Next round: 2023 Silverstone Formula 3 round
Previous round: 2022 Spielberg Formula 3 round	Spielberg Formula 3 round	Next round: 2024 Spielberg Formula 3 round
