= 2025 GT4 Winter Series =

Scheduled motorsport season

The 2025 GT4 Winter Series was the second season of GT4 Winter Series. It started on 16 January 2025 in Circuito do Estoril and finished on 9 March in Circuit de Barcelona-Catalunya.

== Calendar ==
Round	Circuit	Date	Supporting	Map of circuit locations
1	Circuito do Estoril, Estoril, Portugal	16–19 January	GT Winter Series; Prototype Winter Series	2025 GT4 Winter Series is located in Iberia
2	Algarve International Circuit, Portimão, Portugal	23–26 January	GT Winter Series; Prototype Winter Series	2025 GT4 Winter Series is located in Iberia
3	Circuit Ricardo Tormo, Cheste, Spain	13–16 February	Formula Winter Series; GT Winter Series; TCR Spain	2025 GT4 Winter Series is located in Iberia
4	MotorLand Aragón, Alcañiz, Spain	27 February–2 March	Formula Winter Series; GT Winter Series; Prototype Winter Series	2025 GT4 Winter Series is located in Iberia
5	Circuit de Barcelona-Catalunya, Montmeló, Spain	6–9 March	Formula Winter Series; GT Winter Series; Prototype Winter Series	2025 GT4 Winter Series is located in Iberia

== Entry list ==
Team	Car	Engine	No.	Drivers	Class	Rounds
(Portugal) Araújo Competição	Aston Martin Vantage AMR GT4 Evo	Aston Martin M177 4.0 L Twin-Turbo V8	007	(Portugal) Gonçalo Araújo	PA	5
(Portugal) Araújo Competição	Aston Martin Vantage AMR GT4 Evo	Aston Martin M177 4.0 L Twin-Turbo V8	007	(Portugal) Bruno Pereira	PA	5
(Germany) SR Motorsport by Schnitzelalm	Mercedes-AMG GT4	Mercedes-AMG M178 4.0 L Twin-Turbo V8	11	(Germany) Enrico Förderer	P	All
(Germany) SR Motorsport by Schnitzelalm	Mercedes-AMG GT4	Mercedes-AMG M178 4.0 L Twin-Turbo V8	11	(Germany) Jay Mo Härtling	P	All
(Germany) SR Motorsport by Schnitzelalm	Porsche 718 Cayman GT4 RS Clubsport	Porsche MDG 4.0 L Flat-6	110	(Germany) Cedric Fuchs	CT	All
(Germany) SR Motorsport by Schnitzelalm	Porsche 718 Cayman GT4 RS Clubsport	Porsche MDG 4.0 L Flat-6	110	(Germany) Wilhelm Kühne	CT	All
(Germany) SR Motorsport by Schnitzelalm	Porsche 718 Cayman GT4 RS Clubsport	Porsche MDG 4.0 L Flat-6	111	(Germany) Luisa Kahler	CT	All
(Germany) SR Motorsport by Schnitzelalm	Porsche 718 Cayman GT4 RS Clubsport	Porsche MDG 4.0 L Flat-6	111	(Germany) Michael Sander	CT	All
(Austria) Razoon - more than racing	Porsche 718 Cayman GT4 RS Clubsport	Porsche MDG 4.0 L Flat-6	14	(Germany) Denny Berndt	P	5
(Austria) Razoon - more than racing	Porsche 718 Cayman GT4 RS Clubsport	Porsche MDG 4.0 L Flat-6	14	(Austria) Daniel Drexel	P	5
(Austria) Razoon - more than racing	BMW M4 GT4 (G82)	BMW S58B30T0 3.0 L Twin-Turbo I6	60	(Austria) Luis Moser	P	5
(Austria) Razoon - more than racing	BMW M4 GT4 (G82)	BMW S58B30T0 3.0 L Twin-Turbo I6	60	(Germany) Laurenz Rühl	P	5
(Austria) Razoon - more than racing	Porsche 718 Cayman GT4 RS Clubsport	Porsche MDG 4.0 L Flat-6	192	(Austria) Clemens Drexel	PA	5
(Austria) Razoon - more than racing	Porsche 718 Cayman GT4 RS Clubsport	Porsche MDG 4.0 L Flat-6	192	(Austria) Daniel Drexel	PA	5
(Spain) NM Racing	Mercedes-AMG GT4	Mercedes-AMG M178 4.0 L Twin-Turbo V8	16	(United Kingdom) Jonathan Currie	PA	5
(Spain) NM Racing	Mercedes-AMG GT4	Mercedes-AMG M178 4.0 L Twin-Turbo V8	16	(United Kingdom) Phil Keen	PA	5
(Spain) NM Racing	Mercedes-AMG GT4	Mercedes-AMG M178 4.0 L Twin-Turbo V8	88	(United States) Keith Gatehouse	PA	5
(Spain) NM Racing	Mercedes-AMG GT4	Mercedes-AMG M178 4.0 L Twin-Turbo V8	88	(Switzerland) Max Huber	PA	5
(Germany) PROsport Racing	Aston Martin Vantage AMR GT4 Evo	Aston Martin M177 4.0 L Twin-Turbo V8	17	(Germany) Anton Abée	P	5
(Germany) PROsport Racing	Aston Martin Vantage AMR GT4 Evo	Aston Martin M177 4.0 L Twin-Turbo V8	17	(Germany) Roman Fellner-Feldegg	P	5
(Germany) BWT Mücke Motorsport	Mercedes-AMG GT4	Mercedes-AMG M178 4.0 L Twin-Turbo V8	18	(Sweden) Axel Bengtsson	P	2–3
(Germany) BWT Mücke Motorsport	Mercedes-AMG GT4	Mercedes-AMG M178 4.0 L Twin-Turbo V8	18	(Denmark) Tobias Bille Clausen	P	2–3
(Germany) BWT Mücke Motorsport	Aston Martin V8 Vantage GT4	Aston Martin 4.7L V8	700	(Germany) Thilo Goos	C	1–4
(Germany) BWT Mücke Motorsport	Aston Martin V8 Vantage GT4	Aston Martin 4.7L V8	700	(Germany) Mattis Pluschkell	C	3
(Germany) Lionspeed GP	Porsche 718 Cayman GT4 RS Clubsport	Porsche MDG 4.0 L Flat-6	24	(Brazil) José Garcia	Am	2
(Germany) Lionspeed GP	Porsche 718 Cayman GT4 RS Clubsport	Porsche MDG 4.0 L Flat-6	24	(Spain) Steven Berndtson Ammat	Am	2
(Germany) W&S Motorsport	Porsche 718 Cayman GT4 RS Clubsport	Porsche MDG 4.0 L Flat-6	30	(Germany) Nico Gründel	PA	All
(Germany) W&S Motorsport	Porsche 718 Cayman GT4 RS Clubsport	Porsche MDG 4.0 L Flat-6	30	(United States) Tim Horrell	PA	All
(Germany) W&S Motorsport	Porsche 718 Cayman GT4 RS Clubsport	Porsche MDG 4.0 L Flat-6	31	(Germany) Alon Gabbay	P	All
(Germany) W&S Motorsport	Porsche 718 Cayman GT4 RS Clubsport	Porsche MDG 4.0 L Flat-6	31	(Germany) Maximilian Schreyer	P	All
(Germany) W&S Motorsport	Porsche 718 Cayman GT4 RS Clubsport	Porsche MDG 4.0 L Flat-6	32	(Turkey) Kuzey Çitak	P	3
(Germany) W&S Motorsport	Porsche 718 Cayman GT4 RS Clubsport	Porsche MDG 4.0 L Flat-6	32	(United States) Ismaeel Ellahi	P	3
(Germany) W&S Motorsport	Porsche 718 Cayman GT4 RS Clubsport	Porsche MDG 4.0 L Flat-6	32	(Germany) Daniel Blickle	Am	4–5
(Germany) W&S Motorsport	Porsche 718 Cayman GT4 RS Clubsport	Porsche MDG 4.0 L Flat-6	32	(Germany) Max Kronberg	Am	5
(Germany) W&S Motorsport	Porsche 718 Cayman GT4 RS Clubsport	Porsche MDG 4.0 L Flat-6	33	(Sweden) Daniel Nilsson	PA	5
(Germany) W&S Motorsport	Porsche 718 Cayman GT4 RS Clubsport	Porsche MDG 4.0 L Flat-6	33	(Germany) Luciano Schneider	PA	5
(Portugal) Monteiros Competições	BMW M4 GT4 (F82)	BMW N55 3.0 L Twin-Turbo I6	32	(Portugal) Rui Miritta	C	1
(Portugal) Monteiros Competições	BMW M4 GT4 (F82)	BMW N55 3.0 L Twin-Turbo I6	32	(Portugal) Henrique Moura Oliveira	C	1
(Germany) Plusline Racing Team	Porsche 718 Cayman GT4 RS Clubsport	Porsche MDG 4.0 L Flat-6	38	(Germany) Joachim Bölting	Am 1–3, 5 PA 4	All
(Germany) Plusline Racing Team	Porsche 718 Cayman GT4 RS Clubsport	Porsche MDG 4.0 L Flat-6	38	(Germany) Peter Terting	Am 1–3, 5 PA 4	4
(Germany) Plusline Racing Team	Porsche 718 Cayman GT4 RS Clubsport	Porsche MDG 4.0 L Flat-6	69	(Germany) Peter Lobeck	PA	1–2
(Germany) Plusline Racing Team	Porsche 718 Cayman GT4 RS Clubsport	Porsche MDG 4.0 L Flat-6	69	(Germany) Peter Terting	PA	1–2
(Switzerland) Racing Spirit of Léman	Aston Martin Vantage AMR GT4 Evo	Aston Martin M177 4.0 L Twin-Turbo V8	39	(France) Baudouin Detout	P	All
(Switzerland) Racing Spirit of Léman	Aston Martin Vantage AMR GT4 Evo	Aston Martin M177 4.0 L Twin-Turbo V8	39	(Germany) Maximilian Hewitt	P	All
(Poland) Förch Racing by Atlas Ward	Porsche 718 Cayman GT4 RS Clubsport	Porsche MDG 4.0 L Flat-6	41	(Poland) Marcin Karczewski	CT	3
(Poland) Förch Racing by Atlas Ward	Porsche 718 Cayman GT4 RS Clubsport	Porsche MDG 4.0 L Flat-6	41	(Poland) Jakub Litwin	CT	3
(Poland) Förch Racing by Atlas Ward	Porsche 718 Cayman GT4 RS Clubsport	Porsche MDG 4.0 L Flat-6	41	(Poland) Karol Kręt	CT	5
(Poland) Förch Racing by Atlas Ward	Porsche 718 Cayman GT4 RS Clubsport	Porsche MDG 4.0 L Flat-6	41	(Poland) Jakub Twaróg	CT	5
(Sweden) Wileco Motorsport	Porsche 718 Cayman GT4 RS Clubsport	Porsche MDG 4.0 L Flat-6	56	(Sweden) Andreas Andersson	Am	5
(Sweden) Wileco Motorsport	Porsche 718 Cayman GT4 RS Clubsport	Porsche MDG 4.0 L Flat-6	56	(Sweden) Richard Andemark	Am	5
(Germany) Speedworxx Automotive	Porsche 718 Cayman GT4 RS Clubsport	Porsche MDG 4.0 L Flat-6	66	(Germany) Arne Hoffmeister	CT	2–3, 5
(Germany) Speedworxx Automotive	Porsche 718 Cayman GT4 RS Clubsport	Porsche MDG 4.0 L Flat-6	66	(Germany) Franz Linden	CT	2–3, 5
(United Kingdom) Century Motorsport	BMW M4 GT4 Evo (G82)	BMW S58B30T0 3.0 L Twin-Turbo I6	71	(India) Ravi Ramyead	INV	All
(United Kingdom) Century Motorsport	BMW M4 GT4 Evo (G82)	BMW S58B30T0 3.0 L Twin-Turbo I6	71	(United Kingdom) Charlie Robertson	INV	All
(United Kingdom) Elite Motorsport	McLaren Artura GT4	McLaren M630 3.0 L Twin-Turbo V6	77	(United Kingdom) McKenzy Cresswell	P	All
(United Kingdom) Elite Motorsport	McLaren Artura GT4	McLaren M630 3.0 L Twin-Turbo V6	77	(United Kingdom) Josh Rattican	P	1–2
(United Kingdom) Elite Motorsport	McLaren Artura GT4	McLaren M630 3.0 L Twin-Turbo V6	77	(United Kingdom) Tom Lebbon	P	3–5
(Germany) Mertel Motorsport	Porsche 718 Cayman GT4 RS Clubsport	Porsche MDG 4.0 L Flat-6	80	(United Kingdom) Oscar Ryndziewicz	CT	3
(United Kingdom) SVG Motorsport	Ginetta G56 GT4 Evo	GM LS3 6.2 L V8	82	(United Kingdom) Marc Elman	PA	1–2, 4–5
(United Kingdom) SVG Motorsport	Ginetta G56 GT4 Evo	GM LS3 6.2 L V8	82	(United Kingdom) Owen Hizzey	PA	1–2, 4–5
(Germany) Schubert Motorsport	BMW M4 GT4 Evo (G82)	BMW S58B30T0 3.0 L Twin-Turbo I6	98	(Sweden) Victor Bouveng	INV	5
(Germany) Schubert Motorsport	BMW M4 GT4 Evo (G82)	BMW S58B30T0 3.0 L Twin-Turbo I6	98	(Sweden) Joakim Walde	INV	5
(Germany) East Racing Motorsport	Porsche 718 Cayman GT4 RS Clubsport	Porsche MDG 4.0 L Flat-6	99	(Germany) Florian Bauer	PA	5
(Germany) East Racing Motorsport	Porsche 718 Cayman GT4 RS Clubsport	Porsche MDG 4.0 L Flat-6	99	(Germany) Manuel Lauck	PA	5
(Switzerland) Hofor Racing by Bonk Motorsport	BMW M4 GT4 (G82)	BMW S58B30T0 3.0 L Twin-Turbo I6	127	(Switzerland) Martin Kroll	Am	2
(Switzerland) Hofor Racing by Bonk Motorsport	BMW M4 GT4 (G82)	BMW S58B30T0 3.0 L Twin-Turbo I6	127	(Switzerland) Michael Bonk	Am	2
(Switzerland) Hofor Racing by Bonk Motorsport	BMW M4 GT4 Evo (G82)	BMW S58B30T0 3.0 L Twin-Turbo I6	127	(Switzerland) Martin Kroll	INV	5
(Switzerland) Hofor Racing by Bonk Motorsport	BMW M4 GT4 Evo (G82)	BMW S58B30T0 3.0 L Twin-Turbo I6	127	(Switzerland) Michael Bonk	INV	5
(Germany) FK Performance Motorsport	BMW M4 GT4 (G82)	BMW S58B30T0 3.0 L Twin-Turbo I6	187	(South Africa) Joseph Ellerine	P	2, 5
(Germany) FK Performance Motorsport	BMW M4 GT4 (G82)	BMW S58B30T0 3.0 L Twin-Turbo I6	187	(Finland) Benjamin Sylvestersson	P	2, 5
(United States) RAFA Racing by Race Lab	McLaren Artura GT4	McLaren M630 3.0 L Twin-Turbo V6	812	(United Kingdom) Callum Davies	P	All
(United States) RAFA Racing by Race Lab	McLaren Artura GT4	McLaren M630 3.0 L Twin-Turbo V6	812	(United Kingdom) Charlie Hart	P	All

Icon	Class
P	Pro
PA	Pro-Am
Am	Am
CT	Cayman Trophy
C	Club
INV	Invited

== Results ==
Bold indicates overall winner.

Round		Circuit	Pole position	Pro Winners	Pro-Am Winners	Am Winners	Cayman Trophy Winners	Club Winners	Invited Winners
1	R1	(Portugal) Circuito do Estoril	(United Kingdom) No. 77 Elite Motorsport	**(United Kingdom) No. 77 Elite Motorsport**	(Germany) No. 30 W&S Motorsport	(Germany) No. 38 Plusline Racing Team	(Germany) No. 111 SR Motorsport by Schnitzelalm	(Germany) No. 700 BWT Mücke Motorsport	(United Kingdom) No. 71 Century Motorsport
1	R1	(Portugal) Circuito do Estoril	(United Kingdom) McKenzy Cresswell (United Kingdom) Josh Rattican	**(United Kingdom) McKenzy Cresswell** **(United Kingdom) Josh Rattican**	(Germany) Nico Gründel (United States) Tim Horrell	(Germany) Joachim Bölting	(Germany) Luisa Kahler (Germany) Michael Sander	(Germany) Thilo Goos	(India) Ravi Ramyead (United Kingdom) Charlie Robertson
1	R2	(Portugal) Circuito do Estoril	(Germany) No. 11 SR Motorsport by Schnitzelalm	**(United Kingdom) No. 77 Elite Motorsport**	(Germany) No. 69 Plusline Racing Team	No starters	(Germany) No. 110 SR Motorsport by Schnitzelalm	(Portugal) No. 32 Monteiros Competições	(United Kingdom) No. 71 Century Motorsport
1	R2	(Portugal) Circuito do Estoril	(Germany) Enrico Förderer (Germany) Jay Mo Härtling	**(United Kingdom) McKenzy Cresswell** **(United Kingdom) Josh Rattican**	(Germany) Peter Lobeck (Germany) Peter Terting	No starters	(Germany) Cedric Fuchs (Germany) Wilhelm Kühne	(Portugal) Riu Miritta (Portugal) Henrique Moura Oliveira	(India) Ravi Ramyead (United Kingdom) Charlie Robertson
1	R3	(Portugal) Circuito do Estoril	(Germany) No. 11 SR Motorsport by Schnitzelalm	**(United Kingdom) No. 77 Elite Motorsport**	(Germany) No. 30 W&S Motorsport	No starters	(Germany) No. 110 SR Motorsport by Schnitzelalm	(Portugal) No. 32 Monteiros Competições	(United Kingdom) No. 71 Century Motorsport
1	R3	(Portugal) Circuito do Estoril	(Germany) Enrico Förderer (Germany) Jay Mo Härtling	**(United Kingdom) McKenzy Cresswell** **(United Kingdom) Josh Rattican**	(Germany) Nico Gründel (United States) Tim Horrell	No starters	(Germany) Cedric Fuchs (Germany) Wilhelm Kühne	(Portugal) Riu Miritta (Portugal) Henrique Moura Oliveira	(India) Ravi Ramyead (United Kingdom) Charlie Robertson
2	R1	(Portugal) Algarve International Circuit	(United Kingdom) No. 77 Elite Motorsport	**(United Kingdom) No. 77 Elite Motorsport**	(Germany) No. 69 Plusline Racing Team	(Germany) No. 38 Plusline Racing Team	(Germany) No. 66 Speedworxx Automotive	(Germany) No. 700 BWT Mücke Motorsport	(United Kingdom) No. 71 Century Motorsport
2	R1	(Portugal) Algarve International Circuit	(United Kingdom) McKenzy Cresswell (United Kingdom) Josh Rattican	**(United Kingdom) McKenzy Cresswell** **(United Kingdom) Josh Rattican**	(Germany) Peter Lobeck (Germany) Peter Terting	(Germany) Joachim Bölting	(Germany) Arne Hoffmeister (Germany) Franz Linden	(Germany) Thilo Goos	(India) Ravi Ramyead (United Kingdom) Charlie Robertson
2	R2	(Portugal) Algarve International Circuit	(United States) No. 812 RAFA Racing by Race Lab	**(Germany) No. 11 SR Motorsport by Schnitzelalm**	(Germany) No. 69 Plusline Racing Team	(Germany) No. 38 Plusline Racing Team	(Germany) No. 110 SR Motorsport by Schnitzelalm	(Germany) No. 700 BWT Mücke Motorsport	(United Kingdom) No. 71 Century Motorsport
2	R2	(Portugal) Algarve International Circuit	(United Kingdom) Callum Davies (United Kingdom) Charlie Hart	**(Germany) Enrico Förderer** **(Germany) Jay Mo Härtling**	(Germany) Peter Lobeck (Germany) Peter Terting	(Germany) Joachim Bölting	(Germany) Cedric Fuchs (Germany) Wilhelm Kühne	(Germany) Thilo Goos	(India) Ravi Ramyead (United Kingdom) Charlie Robertson
2	R3	(Portugal) Algarve International Circuit	(United Kingdom) No. 77 Elite Motorsport	**(United States) No. 812 RAFA Racing by Race Lab**	(Germany) No. 30 W&S Motorsport	(Germany) No. 38 Plusline Racing Team	(Germany) No. 66 Speedworxx Automotive	(Germany) No. 700 BWT Mücke Motorsport	(United Kingdom) No. 71 Century Motorsport
2	R3	(Portugal) Algarve International Circuit	(United Kingdom) McKenzy Cresswell (United Kingdom) Josh Rattican	**(United Kingdom) Callum Davies** **(United Kingdom) Charlie Hart**	(Germany) Nico Gründel (United States) Tim Horrell	(Germany) Joachim Bölting	(Germany) Arne Hoffmeister (Germany) Franz Linden	(Germany) Thilo Goos	(India) Ravi Ramyead (United Kingdom) Charlie Robertson
3	R1	(Spain) Circuit Ricardo Tormo	(United States) No. 812 RAFA Racing by Race Lab	**(Germany) No. 11 SR Motorsport by Schnitzelalm**	(Germany) No. 30 W&S Motorsport	(Germany) No. 38 Plusline Racing Team	(Germany) No. 80 Mertel Motorsport	(Germany) No. 700 BWT Mücke Motorsport	(United Kingdom) No. 71 Century Motorsport
3	R1	(Spain) Circuit Ricardo Tormo	(United Kingdom) Callum Davies (United Kingdom) Charlie Hart	**(Germany) Enrico Förderer** **(Germany) Jay Mo Härtling**	(Germany) Nico Gründel (United States) Tim Horrell	(Germany) Joachim Bölting	(United Kingdom) Oscar Ryndziewicz	(Germany) Thilo Goos (Germany) Mattis Pluschkell	(India) Ravi Ramyead (United Kingdom) Charlie Robertson
3	R2	(Spain) Circuit Ricardo Tormo	(Germany) No. 11 SR Motorsport by Schnitzelalm	**(Germany) No. 11 SR Motorsport by Schnitzelalm**	(Germany) No. 30 W&S Motorsport	(Germany) No. 38 Plusline Racing Team	(Germany) No. 110 SR Motorsport by Schnitzelalm	(Germany) No. 700 BWT Mücke Motorsport	(United Kingdom) No. 71 Century Motorsport
3	R2	(Spain) Circuit Ricardo Tormo	(Germany) Enrico Förderer (Germany) Jay Mo Härtling	**(Germany) Enrico Förderer** **(Germany) Jay Mo Härtling**	(Germany) Nico Gründel (United States) Tim Horrell	(Germany) Joachim Bölting	(Germany) Cedric Fuchs (Germany) Wilhelm Kühne	(Germany) Thilo Goos (Germany) Mattis Pluschkell	(India) Ravi Ramyead (United Kingdom) Charlie Robertson
3	R3	(Spain) Circuit Ricardo Tormo	(Germany) No. 11 SR Motorsport by Schnitzelalm	**(Germany) No. 11 SR Motorsport by Schnitzelalm**	(Germany) No. 30 W&S Motorsport	(Germany) No. 38 Plusline Racing Team	(Germany) No. 66 Speedworxx Automotive	(Germany) No. 700 BWT Mücke Motorsport	(United Kingdom) No. 71 Century Motorsport
3	R3	(Spain) Circuit Ricardo Tormo	(Germany) Enrico Förderer (Germany) Jay Mo Härtling	**(Germany) Enrico Förderer** **(Germany) Jay Mo Härtling**	(Germany) Nico Gründel (United States) Tim Horrell	(Germany) Joachim Bölting	(Germany) Arne Hoffmeister (Germany) Franz Linden	(Germany) Thilo Goos (Germany) Mattis Pluschkell	(India) Ravi Ramyead (United Kingdom) Charlie Robertson
4	R1	(Spain) MotorLand Aragón	(United Kingdom) No. 77 Elite Motorsport	**(Germany) No. 11 SR Motorsport by Schnitzelalm**	(Germany) No. 38 Plusline Racing Team	(Germany) No. 32 W&S Motorsport	(Germany) No. 111 SR Motorsport by Schnitzelalm	(Germany) No. 700 BWT Mücke Motorsport	(United Kingdom) No. 71 Century Motorsport
4	R1	(Spain) MotorLand Aragón	(United Kingdom) McKenzy Cresswell (United Kingdom) Tom Lebbon	**(Germany) Enrico Förderer** **(Germany) Jay Mo Härtling**	(Germany) Joachim Bölting (Germany) Peter Terting	(Germany) Daniel Blickle	(Germany) Luisa Kahler (Germany) Michael Sander	(Germany) Thilo Goos	(India) Ravi Ramyead (United Kingdom) Charlie Robertson
4	R2	(Spain) MotorLand Aragón	(Germany) No. 11 SR Motorsport by Schnitzelalm	**(Germany) No. 31 W&S Motorsport**	(United Kingdom) No. 82 SVG Motorsport	No finishers	(Germany) No. 110 SR Motorsport by Schnitzelalm	No finishers	(United Kingdom) No. 71 Century Motorsport
4	R2	(Spain) MotorLand Aragón	(Germany) Enrico Förderer (Germany) Jay Mo Härtling	**(Germany) Alon Gabbay** **(Germany) Maximilian Schreyer**	(United Kingdom) Marc Elman (United Kingdom) Owen Hizzey	No finishers	(Germany) Cedric Fuchs (Germany) Wilhelm Kühne	No finishers	(India) Ravi Ramyead (United Kingdom) Charlie Robertson
4	R3	(Spain) MotorLand Aragón	(United Kingdom) No. 77 Elite Motorsport	**(United Kingdom) No. 77 Elite Motorsport**	(United Kingdom) No. 82 SVG Motorsport	(Germany) No. 32 W&S Motorsport	(Germany) No. 111 SR Motorsport by Schnitzelalm	No starters	(United Kingdom) No. 71 Century Motorsport
4	R3	(Spain) MotorLand Aragón	(United Kingdom) McKenzy Cresswell (United Kingdom) Tom Lebbon	**(United Kingdom) McKenzy Cresswell** **(United Kingdom) Tom Lebbon**	(United Kingdom) Marc Elman (United Kingdom) Owen Hizzey	(Germany) Daniel Blickle	(Germany) Luisa Kahler (Germany) Michael Sander	No starters	(India) Ravi Ramyead (United Kingdom) Charlie Robertson
5	R1	(Spain) Circuit de Barcelona-Catalunya	(United States) No. 812 RAFA Racing by Race Lab	**(United States) No. 812 RAFA Racing by Race Lab**	(Germany) No. 30 W&S Motorsport	(Germany) No. 38 Plusline Racing Team	(Poland) No. 41 Förch Racing by Atlas Ward	No entries	(United Kingdom) No. 71 Century Motorsport
5	R1	(Spain) Circuit de Barcelona-Catalunya	(United Kingdom) Callum Davies (United Kingdom) Charlie Hart	**(United Kingdom) Callum Davies** **(United Kingdom) Charlie Hart**	(Germany) Nico Gründel (United States) Tim Horrell	(Germany) Joachim Bölting	(Poland) Karol Kręt (Poland) Jakub Twaróg	No entries	(India) Ravi Ramyead (United Kingdom) Charlie Robertson
5	R2	(Spain) Circuit de Barcelona-Catalunya	(Austria) No. 14 Razoon - more than racing	**(Austria) No. 14 Razoon - more than racing**	(United Kingdom) No. 82 SVG Motorsport	(Germany) No. 32 W&S Motorsport	(Germany) No. 110 SR Motorsport by Schnitzelalm	No entries	(United Kingdom) No. 71 Century Motorsport
5	R2	(Spain) Circuit de Barcelona-Catalunya	(Germany) Denny Berndt (Austria) Daniel Drexel	**(Germany) Denny Berndt** **(Austria) Daniel Drexel**	(United Kingdom) Marc Elman (United Kingdom) Owen Hizzey	(Germany) Daniel Blickle (Germany) Max Kronberg	(Germany) Cedric Fuchs (Germany) Wilhelm Kühne	No entries	(India) Ravi Ramyead (United Kingdom) Charlie Robertson
5	R3	(Spain) Circuit de Barcelona-Catalunya	(United Kingdom) No. 77 Elite Motorsport	**(United Kingdom) No. 77 Elite Motorsport**	(Spain) No. 16 NM Racing	(Germany) No. 32 W&S Motorsport	(Germany) No. 111 SR Motorsport by Schnitzelalm	No entries	(Germany) No. 98 Schubert Motorsport
5	R3	(Spain) Circuit de Barcelona-Catalunya	(United Kingdom) McKenzy Cresswell (United Kingdom) Tom Lebbon	**(United Kingdom) McKenzy Cresswell** **(United Kingdom) Tom Lebbon**	(United Kingdom) Jonathan Currie (United Kingdom) Phil Keen	(Germany) Daniel Blickle (Germany) Max Kronberg	(Germany) Luisa Kahler (Germany) Michael Sander	No entries	(Sweden) Victor Bouveng (Sweden) Joakim Walde

== Championship standings ==
=== Scoring system ===
For overall classification top 10 gets points, from 25 points for 1st place, to 1 point for 10th place.

Position	**1st**	**2nd**	**3rd**	**4th**	**5th**	**6th**	**7th**	**8th**	**9th**	**10th**
Points	25	18	15	12	10	8	6	4	2	1

In class classifications number of points awarded to the competitors is based on the number of entrants in that class.

Position in class	Number of starters per class						
Position in class	1	2	3	4	5	6	7+
1st	10	12	14	16	18	20	20
2nd		10	12	14	16	18	18
3rd			10	12	14	16	16
4th				10	12	14	14
5th					10	12	12
6th						10	10
7th+							8

=== Overall ===
Pos.	Driver	Team	EST (Portugal)			ALG (Portugal)			CRT (Spain)			ARA (Spain)			BAR (Spain)			Points
Pos.	Driver	Team	RC1	RC2	RC3	RC1	RC2	RC3	RC1	RC2	RC3	RC1	RC2	RC3	RC1	RC2	RC3	Points
1	(United Kingdom) McKenzy Cresswell	(United Kingdom) Elite Motorsport	**1**	1	1	**1**	2	**2**	2	3	2	**2**	2	**1**	2	4	**1**	303
2	(Germany) Enrico Förderer (Germany) Jay Mo Härtling	(Germany) SR Motorsport by Schnitzelalm	3	**3**	**3**	5	1	Ret	1	**1**	**1**	1	**3**	2	3	7	2	252
3	(United Kingdom) Callum Davies (United Kingdom) Charlie Hart	(United States) RAFA Racing by Race Lab	2	9	4	3	**5**	1	**DNS**	2	3	5	6	3	**1**	3	14	188
4	(Germany) Alon Gabbay (Germany) Maximilian Schreyer	(Germany) W&S Motorsport	4	6	2	Ret	4	3	3	6	6	4	1	5	5	2	4	183
5	(United Kingdom) Tom Lebbon	(United Kingdom) Elite Motorsport							2	3	2	2	2	1	2	4	**1**	167
6	(United Kingdom) Josh Rattican	(United Kingdom) Elite Motorsport	**1**	1	1	**1**	2	**2**										136
7	(France) Baudouin Detout (Germany) Maximilian Hewitt	(Switzerland) Racing Spirit of Léman	6	8	10	9	9	8	6	16	14	3	10	4	6	Ret	11	65
8	(Germany) Peter Terting	(Germany) Plusline Racing Team	9	2	WD	7	3	6				6	8	10				62
9	(Sweden) Axel Bengtsson (Denmark) Tobias Bille Clausen	(Germany) BWT Mücke Motorsport				4	DSQ	4	4	5	4							58
10	(United Kingdom) Marc Elman (United Kingdom) Owen Hizzey	(United Kingdom) SVG Motorsport	10	4	9	12	6	16				10	4	7	16	5	Ret	52
11	(Germany) Nico Gründel (United States) Tim Horrell	(Germany) W&S Motorsport	5	7	5	10	11	5	13	9	9	8	9	9	10	20	16	50
12	(Germany) Peter Lobeck	(Germany) Plusline Racing Team	9	2	WD	7	3	6										49
13	(Germany) Joachim Bölting	(Germany) Plusline Racing Team	11	WD	WD	8	13	7	7	7	5	6	8	10	9	18	Ret	47
14	(South Africa) Joseph Ellerine (Finland) Benjamin Sylvestersson	(Germany) FK Performance Motorsport				2	10	Ret							4	17	3	46
15	(Germany) Cedric Fuchs (Germany) Wilhelm Kühne	(Germany) SR Motorsport by Schnitzelalm	12	5	7	13	7	10	12	8	8	12	5	12	22	8	17	45
16	(Germany) Denny Berndt (Austria) Daniel Drexel	(Austria) Razoon - more than racing													8	**1**	6	37
17	(Germany) Luisa Kahler (Germany) Michael Sander	(Germany) SR Motorsport by Schnitzelalm	8	11	8	14	12	11	10	10	12	11	11	11	Ret	9	15	12
18	(Sweden) Daniel Nilsson (Germany) Luciano Schneider	(Germany) W&S Motorsport													15	6	9	10
19	(Germany) Daniel Blickle	(Germany) W&S Motorsport										9	Ret	8	12	13	8	10
20	(Germany) Arne Hoffmeister (Germany) Franz Linden	(Germany) Speedworxx Automotive				11	14	9	15	12	7				Ret	DSQ	19	8
21	(Germany) Anton Abée (Germany) Roman Fellner-Feldegg	(Germany) PROsport Racing													7	12	22	6
22	(United Kingdom) Jonathan Currie (United Kingdom) Phil Keen	(Spain) NM Racing													21	24	7	6
23	(Turkey) Kuzey Çitak (United States) Ismaeel Ellahi	(Germany) W&S Motorsport							8	11	10							5
24	(Germany) Max Kronberg	(Germany) W&S Motorsport													12	13	8	4
25	(United Kingdom) Oscar Ryndziewicz	(Germany) Mertel Motorsport							9	13	11							2
26	(Germany) Florian Bauer (Germany) Manuel Lauck	(Germany) East Racing Motorsport													11	10	Ret	1
27	(Portugal) Gonçalo Araújo (Portugal) Bruno Pereira	(Portugal) Araújo Competição													14	15	10	1
28	(Portugal) Rui Miritta (Portugal) Henrique Moura Oliveira	(Portugal) Monteiros Competições	14	12	11													0
29	(Poland) Marcin Karczewski (Poland) Jakub Litwin	(Poland) Förch Racing by Atlas Ward							11	14	16							0
30	(Germany) Thilo Goos	(Germany) BWT Mücke Motorsport	13	13	12	15	16	13	14	15	15	13	Ret	DNS				0
31	(Austria) Luis Moser (Germany) Laurenz Rühl	(Austria) Razoon - more than racing													18	16	12	0
32	(Brazil) José Garcia (Spain) Steven Berndtson Ammat	(Germany) Lionspeed GP				17	17	12										0
33	(Austria) Clemens Drexel	(Austria) Razoon - more than racing													23	19	13	0
34	(Germany) Mattis Pluschkell	(Germany) BWT Mücke Motorsport							14	15	15							0
35	(Switzerland) Martin Kroll (Note: Bonk and Kroll were entered in the Invited class for the round at Circuit de Barcelona-Catalunya.) (Switzerland) Michael Bonk	(Switzerland) Hofor Racing by Bonk Motorsport				16	15	14							25	23	23	0
36	(United States) Keith Gatehouse (Switzerland) Max Huber	(Spain) NM Racing													17	25	20	0
37	(Sweden) Andreas Andersson (Sweden) Richard Andemark	(Sweden) Wileco Motorsport													19	22	Ret	0
38	(Poland) Karol Kręt (Poland) Jakub Twaróg	(Poland) Förch Racing by Atlas Ward													20	21	21	0
Invited entries ineligible for points
–	(India) Ravi Ramyead (United Kingdom) Charlie Robertson	(United Kingdom) Century Motorsport	7	10	6	6	8	15	5	4	13	7	7	6	13	11	18	–
–	(Sweden) Victor Bouveng (Sweden) Joakim Walde	(Germany) Schubert Motorsport													24	14	5	–
Pos.	Driver	Team	EST (Portugal)			ALG (Portugal)			CRT (Spain)			ARA (Spain)			BAR (Spain)			Points

Colour	Result
Gold	Winner
Silver	Second place
Bronze	Third place
Green	Points classification
Blue	Non-points classification
Blue	Non-classified finish (NC)
Purple	Retired, not classified (Ret)
Red	Did not qualify (DNQ)
Red	Did not pre-qualify (DNPQ)
Black	Disqualified (DSQ)
White	Did not start (DNS)
White	Withdrew (WD)
White	Race cancelled (C)
Blank	Did not practice (DNP)
Blank	Did not arrive (DNA)
Blank	Excluded (EX)

**Bold** – Pole

Italics – Fastest Lap

† — Did not finish, but classified
