= 2023 Silverstone Formula 3 round =

(United Kingdom) 2023 Silverstone Formula 3 round
Round details
- Round 6 of 9 in the 2023 FIA Formula 3 Championship.
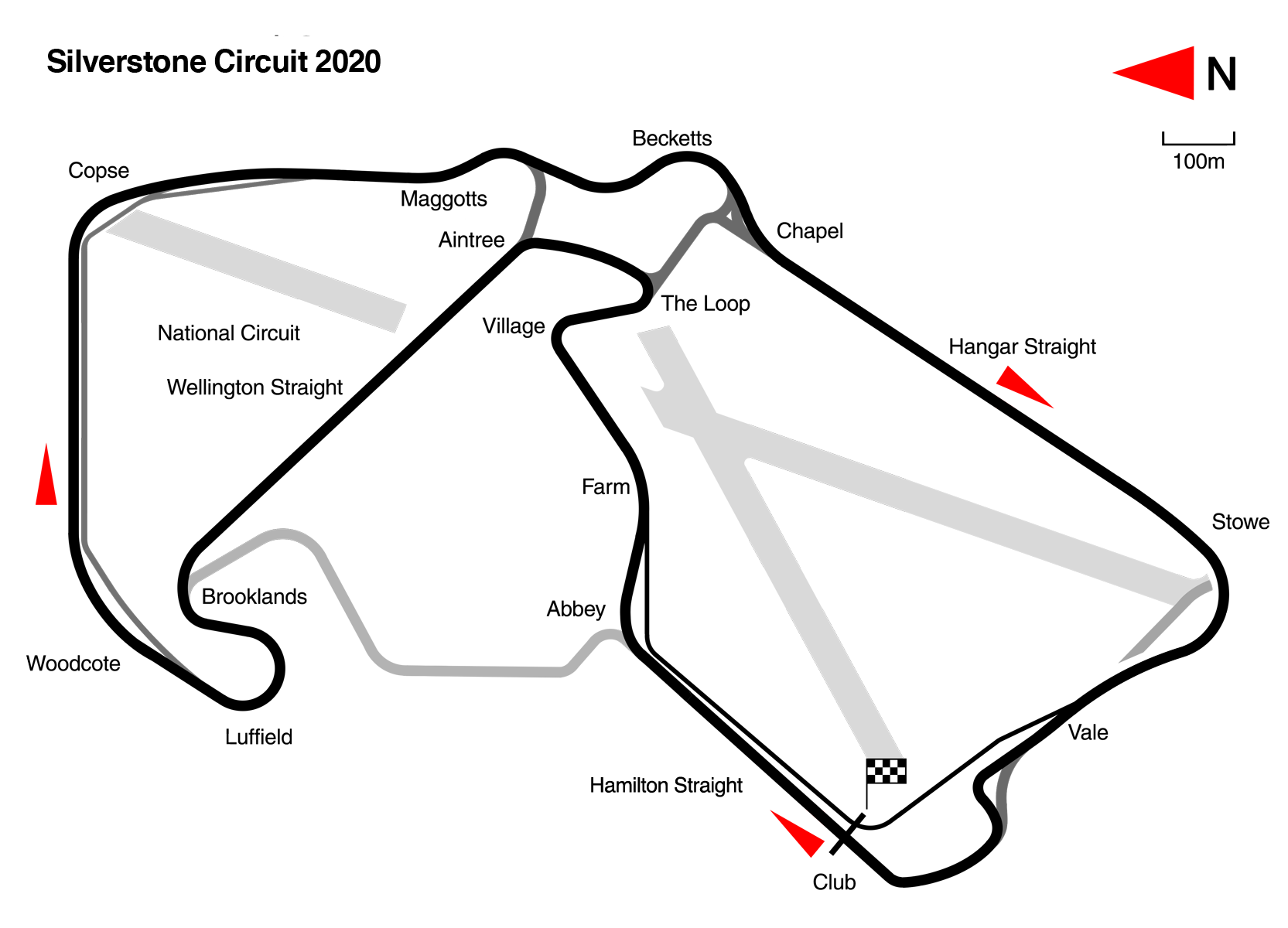
- Location: Silverstone Circuit, Silverstone, United Kingdom
- Course: Permanent Circuit; 5.891 km (3.661 mi)

Sprint Race
- Date: 8 July 2023
- Laps: 18
Podium
First	(Argentina) Franco Colapinto	MP Motorsport
Second	(Brazil) Gabriel Bortoleto	Trident
Third	(United Kingdom) Christian Mansell	Campos Racing
Fastest lap
Driver	(Estonia) Paul Aron	Prema Racing
- Time: 1:48.510 (on lap 3)

Feature Race
- Date: 9 July 2023
- Laps: 22
Pole position
Driver	(Italy) Leonardo Fornaroli	Trident
Time	1:45.520	
Podium
First	(Germany) Oliver Goethe	Trident
Second	(Italy) Leonardo Fornaroli	Trident
Third	(Spain) Pepe Martí	Campos Racing
Fastest lap
Driver	(United Kingdom) Zak O'Sullivan	Prema Racing
- Time: 1:47.309 (on lap 9)

The 2023 Silverstone Formula 3 round was a motor racing event held between 7 and 9 July at the Silverstone Circuit, Silverstone, United Kingdom. It was the sixth round of the 2023 FIA Formula 3 Championship, and was held in support of the 2023 British Grand Prix.

== Background ==
=== Driver changes ===
Prior to the round at the Silverstone, Rodin Carlin announced that GB3 racer Max Esterson had taken over Hunter Yeany's seat for the Silverstone and Budapest rounds.

== Classification ==
=== Qualifying ===
Pos.	No.	Driver	Team	Time/Gap	R1	R2
1	4	(Italy) Leonardo Fornaroli	Trident	1:45.520	12	1
2	6	(Germany) Oliver Goethe	Trident	+0.126	11	2
3	23	(Spain) Pepe Martí	Campos Racing	+0.354	10	3
4	24	(Australia) Christian Mansell (Note: Mansell is an Australian driver competing under a British licence.)	Campos Racing	+0.389	9	4
5	5	(Brazil) Gabriel Bortoleto	Trident	+0.390	8	5
6	1	(Estonia) Paul Aron	Prema Racing	+0.425	7	6
7	15	(Italy) Gabriele Minì	Hitech Pulse-Eight	+0.520	6	7
8	16	(United Kingdom) Luke Browning	Hitech Pulse-Eight	+0.526	5	8
9	10	(Argentina) Franco Colapinto	MP Motorsport	+0.544	4	9
10	27	(United Kingdom) Taylor Barnard	Jenzer Motorsport	+0.635	3	10
11	12	(United Kingdom) Jonny Edgar	MP Motorsport	+0.649	2	11
12	14	(Colombia) Sebastián Montoya	Hitech Pulse-Eight	+0.729	1	12
13	8	(Switzerland) Grégoire Saucy	ART Grand Prix	+0.750	13	13
14	25	(Australia) Hugh Barter	Campos Racing	+0.757	14	14
15	3	(United Kingdom) Zak O'Sullivan	Prema Racing	+0.812	15	15
16	11	(Spain) Mari Boya	MP Motorsport	+0.826	16	16
17	17	(Brazil) Caio Collet	Van Amersfoort Racing	+0.948	17	17
18	7	(United States) Kaylen Frederick	ART Grand Prix	+1.100	18	18
19	26	(Italy) Nikita Bedrin (Note: Bedrin is a Russian driver competing under an Italian licence.)	Jenzer Motorsport	+1.212	19	19
20	31	(United Kingdom) McKenzy Cresswell	PHM Racing by Charouz	+1.386	20	20
21	18	(Mexico) Rafael Villagómez	Van Amersfoort Racing	+1.451	21	21
22	19	(Australia) Tommy Smith	Van Amersfoort Racing	+1.517	22	22
23	9	(Bulgaria) Nikola Tsolov	ART Grand Prix	+1.534	23	23
24	21	(United States) Max Esterson	Rodin Carlin	+1.587	24	24
25	20	(United Kingdom) Oliver Gray	Rodin Carlin	+1.750	25	25
26	22	(Israel) Ido Cohen	Rodin Carlin	+1.927	26	26
27	28	(Mexico) Alex García	Jenzer Motorsport	+2.040	27	27
28	29	(Germany) Sophia Flörsch	PHM Racing by Charouz	+2.093	28	28
29	30	(Brazil) Roberto Faria	PHM Racing by Charouz	+2.258	29	29
107% time:
—	2	(Sweden) Dino Beganovic	Prema Racing	+1:00.442	30	30

=== Sprint race ===
Pos.	No.	Driver	Team	Laps	Time/Gap	Grid	Pts.
1	10	(Argentina) Franco Colapinto	MP Motorsport	18	37:17.100	4	10
2	5	(Brazil) Gabriel Bortoleto	Trident	18	+3.730	8	9
3	24	(Australia) Christian Mansell	Campos Racing	18	+5.840	9	8
4	17	(Brazil) Caio Collet	Van Amersfoort Racing	18	+6.243	17	7
5	15	(Italy) Gabriele Minì	Hitech Pulse-Eight	18	+14.554	6	6
6	25	(Australia) Hugh Barter	Campos Racing	18	+17.495	14	5
7	4	(Italy) Leonardo Fornaroli	Trident	18	+19.601	12	4 (1)
8	14	(Colombia) Sebastián Montoya	Hitech Pulse-Eight	18	+23.634	1	3
9	22	(Israel) Ido Cohen	Rodin Carlin	18	+42.079^{1}	28	2
10	23	(Spain) Pepe Martí	Campos Racing	18	+52.727	10	1
11	28	(Mexico) Alex García	Jenzer Motorsport	18	+52.817	27	
12	1	(Estonia) Paul Aron	Prema Racing	18	+53.389	7	
13	2	(Sweden) Dino Beganovic	Prema Racing	18	+54.288	30	
14	16	(United Kingdom) Luke Browning	Hitech Pulse-Eight	18	+54.842	5	
15	9	(Bulgaria) Nikola Tsolov	ART Grand Prix	18	+55.953	23	
16	3	(United Kingdom) Zak O'Sullivan	Prema Racing	18	+57.494	15	
17	6	(Germany) Oliver Goethe	Trident	18	+58.394	11	
18	26	(Italy) Nikita Bedrin	Jenzer Motorsport	18	+1:06.489^{2}	19	
19	29	(Germany) Sophia Flörsch	PHM Racing by Charouz	18	+1:07.775	29	
20	18	(Mexico) Rafael Villagómez	Van Amersfoort Racing	18	+1:08.865	21	
21	8	(Switzerland) Grégoire Saucy	ART Grand Prix	18	+1:11.791	13	
22	7	(United States) Kaylen Frederick	ART Grand Prix	18	+1:13.999	18	
23	31	(United Kingdom) McKenzy Cresswell	PHM Racing by Charouz	18	+1:14.957	20	
24	21	(United States) Max Esterson	Rodin Carlin	18	+1:16.445	24	
25	20	(United Kingdom) Oliver Gray	Rodin Carlin	18	+1:16.642^{2}	25	
26	19	(Australia) Tommy Smith	Van Amersfoort Racing	18	+1:31.965	22	
27	30	(Brazil) Roberto Faria	PHM Racing by Charouz	18	+1:32.004^{2}	29	
28	12	(United Kingdom) Jonny Edgar	MP Motorsport	18	+1:43.046	2	
29	11	(Spain) Mari Boya	MP Motorsport	18	+1:46.077^{3}	16	
30	27	(United Kingdom) Taylor Barnard	Jenzer Motorsport	18	+2:00.622^{4}	3	
Fastest lap set by (Estonia) Paul Aron: 1:48.510 (lap 3)

Notes:

- ^1 - Ido Cohen received a 10-second time penalty for causing a collision with Tommy Smith.
- ^2 - Nikita Bedrin, Oliver Gray and Roberto Faria received a 5-second time penalty for track limits violations.
- ^3 - Mari Boya received a 35-second time penalty for track limits violations.
- ^4 - Taylor Barnard received a 10-second time penalty for causing a collision with Sebastián Montoya.

=== Feature race ===
Pos.	No.	Driver	Team	Laps	Time/Gap	Grid	Pts.
1	6	(Germany) Oliver Goethe	Trident	22	47:40.009	2	25
2	4	(Italy) Leonardo Fornaroli	Trident	22	+1.720	1	18 (2)
3	23	(Spain) Pepe Martí	Campos Racing	22	+2.128	3	15 (1)
4	1	(Estonia) Paul Aron	Prema Racing	22	+4.384	6	12
5	24	(Australia) Christian Mansell	Campos Racing	22	+5.968	4	10
6	5	(Brazil) Gabriel Bortoleto	Trident	22	+7.334	5	8
7	15	(Italy) Gabriele Minì	Hitech Pulse-Eight	22	+7.997	7	6
8	10	(Argentina) Franco Colapinto	MP Motorsport	22	+8.529	9	4
9	8	(Switzerland) Grégoire Saucy	ART Grand Prix	22	+10.018	13	2
10	14	(Colombia) Sebastián Montoya	Hitech Pulse-Eight	22	+11.758	12	1
11	9	(Bulgaria) Nikola Tsolov	ART Grand Prix	22	+12.148	23	
12	11	(Spain) Mari Boya	MP Motorsport	22	+12.700	16	
13	25	(Australia) Hugh Barter	Campos Racing	22	+13.169	14	
14	2	(Sweden) Dino Beganovic	Prema Racing	22	+14.075	30	
15	17	(Brazil) Caio Collet	Van Amersfoort Racing	22	+14.680^{1}	17	
16	18	(Mexico) Rafael Villagómez	Van Amersfoort Racing	22	+14.767	21	
17	26	(Italy) Nikita Bedrin	Jenzer Motorsport	22	+15.496	19	
18	3	(United Kingdom) Zak O'Sullivan	Prema Racing	22	+15.808	15	
19	7	(United States) Kaylen Frederick	ART Grand Prix	22	+16.481	18	
20	20	(United Kingdom) Oliver Gray	Rodin Carlin	22	+18.067	25	
21	27	(United Kingdom) Taylor Barnard	Jenzer Motorsport	22	+18.914	10	
22	31	(United Kingdom) McKenzy Cresswell	PHM Racing by Charouz	22	+20.308	20	
23	29	(Germany) Sophia Flörsch	PHM Racing by Charouz	22	+20.723	28	
24	22	(Israel) Ido Cohen	Rodin Carlin	22	+22.913	26	
25	19	(Australia) Tommy Smith	Van Amersfoort Racing	22	+25.192^{2}	22	
26	28	(Mexico) Alex García	Jenzer Motorsport	22	+26.901	27	
DNF	30	(Brazil) Roberto Faria	PHM Racing by Charouz	16	Accident	29	
DNF	21	(United States) Max Esterson	Rodin Carlin	14	Retired	24	
NC	12	(United Kingdom) Jonny Edgar	MP Motorsport	11	+11 laps	11	
DNF	16	(United Kingdom) Luke Browning	Hitech Pulse-Eight	1	Spun off	9	
Fastest lap set by: (United Kingdom) Zak O'Sullivan 1:47.309 (lap 9)

Notes:

- ^1 - Caio Collet received a 5-second time penalty for overtaking Ido Cohen off track.
- ^2 - Tommy Smith received a 15-second time penalty for track limits violations.

== Standings after the event ==
Drivers' Championship standings

	Pos.	Driver	Points
	1	(Brazil) Gabriel Bortoleto	128
	2	(Spain) Pepe Martí	92
2	3	(Italy) Gabriele Mini	77
2	4	(Estonia) Paul Aron	77
2	5	(Sweden) Dino Beganovic	75

Teams' Championship standings

	Pos.	Team	Points
1	1	(Italy) Trident	238
1	2	(Italy) Prema Racing	225
	3	(United Kingdom) Hitech Pulse-Eight	143
	4	(Spain) Campos Racing	130
	5	(Netherlands) MP Motorsport	102

- Note: Only the top five positions are included for both sets of standings.

== See also ==
- 2023 British Grand Prix
- 2023 Silverstone Formula 2 round

== Notes ==
Previous round: 2023 Spielberg Formula 3 round	FIA Formula 3 Championship; 2023 season	Next round: 2023 Budapest Formula 3 round
Previous round: 2022 Silverstone Formula 3 round	Silverstone Formula 3 round	Next round: 2024 Silverstone Formula 3 round
