= Dexter R. Voisin =

American-Trinidadian social work scientist and author (born 1963)

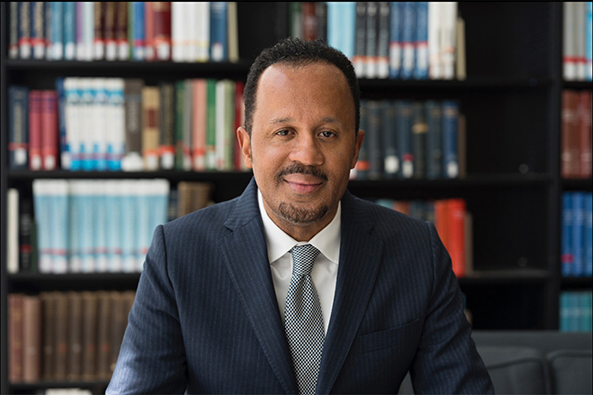
- Born: Dexter Rommell Voisin; Trinidad, West Indies
- Education: Columbia University, Ph.D., Columbia University, M. Phil, University of Michigan, M.S.W. St. Andrew's College, B.A.
- Scientific career
- Fields: Clinical social work; Social scientist; Behavioral science
- Workplaces: Case Western Reserve University (2022–present)

Dexter Rommell Voisin (born September 1963) is an American-Trinidadian social work scientist, professor, author, psychotherapist, and public speaker.

Voisin is the president of the National Association of Deans and Directors. He focuses on the impact of interpersonal, community and structural violence on the health and mental health of racialized youth and the factors that promote resiliency.

Voisin is ranked among the world's most-cited researchers. He has been recognized as one of the most influential Black scholars in social work. In 2024, Voisin was described as a 'social work pioneer' by the National Association of Social Workers.

== History ==
Voisin was born in Trinidad, West Indies, to a working-class family and moved to the United States at an early age.

From 2019 to 2021 he was Dean and held the Sandra Rotman Chair in Social Work at the University of Toronto's Factor-Inwentash Faculty of Social Work (FIFSW), which is ranked #1 nationally and #2 globally. He was the first person of color to be appointed dean at FIFSW. Prior to this appointment, he was a professor at the University of Chicago's School of Social Service Administration (SSA) for two decades and director and co-director at the STI/HIV Intervention Network and the Chicago Center for HIV Elimination, also at the University of Chicago.

Voisin was the first person of color to be promoted through the ranks of assistant professor to full professor in SSA's 120-year history. He is recognized as one of the most influential and cited Black scholars in premier schools of social work in the United States. His scholarship has informed public health policy in Illinois.

In January 2022, Voisin began his tenure as Dean of the Jack, Joseph and Morton Mandel School of Applied Social Sciences at Case Western Reserve University in Cleveland, Ohio.

== Tenures ==
In 2020, Voisin was elected a board member of the Society for Social Work and Research (SSWR) and became a SSWR Fellow in 2022. In 2021, he was inducted as a fellow into the American Academy of Social Work and Social Welfare (AASWSW) and was appointed to their board in 2022. In 2023, Voisin was elected president of the National Association of Deans and Directors (NADD), and in 2024, he was named a Social Work Pioneer by the National Association of Social Workers Foundation (NASWF), among the highest honors in the social work profession.

- President of the National Association of Deans and Directors
- Board Member of the American Academy of Social Work and Social Welfare
- Dean of the Factor-Inwentash Faculty of Social Work (University of Toronto)
- Director of the STI/HIV Intervention Network (University of Chicago)

== Books ==
Voisin wrote the book America the Beautiful and Violent: Black Youth and Neighborhood Trauma in Chicago, published by Columbia University Press.

== Media excerpts ==
Voisin's expertise and research findings have been frequently cited by numerous members of the international, national, and local media:

- "American social worker Dexter Voisin chats with Joey Florez about community violence," El Español, December 19, 2024, (es)
- "The Inquiry: Why are murder rates in Chicago so high?," BBC, May 20, 2021
- "Gun violence steadily increasing across Us," WGN NewsNation, October 13, 2020
- "Concerns about China's influence don't end at the WHO, experts say. They're calling for sweeping reviews of international bodies," Toronto Star, April 16, 2020
- “America the beautiful tackles structural issues in Chicago,” WTTW, PBS, Chicago, January 29, 2020
- “'We all pay the cost' of city violence," Chicago Sun Times, January 21, 2020
- "U of T's Dexter Voisin takes a deep dive into the issues that drive neighborhood violence in Chicago and beyond," U of T News, August 14, 2019
- "Dexter Voisin to become new dean at Factor-Inwentish School of Social Work," U of T News, May 17, 2019
- "Confab examines STIs and HIV among youth," Windy City Times, November 11, 2013
- "A Chicago reporter questions news about the city's violence," StarTribune, March 16, 2013
- “Impact of street violence on Chicago youth," Chicago Tonight, PBS, February 28, 2013
- “Teens exposed to gun violence face tough road," NPR, March 26, 2011
- In Chicago, stopping crime before it happens," NPR, March 25, 2011
- “Professor's goal: Separate HIV facts from fiction," Chicago Tribune, December 28, 2009
- “36 Chicago area students killed sets record," Washington Times, May 13, 2009
- “Deadly Lessons: 24 Hours in Chicago," Anderson Cooper 360 Degrees, CNN, June 3, 2007
