= Josh Rattican =

British racing driver (born 2004)

- Nationality: (United Kingdom) British
- Born: Joshua Paul Rattican; 21 February 2004 (age 22) Sheffield, England

GT4 European Series career
- Debut season: 2023
- Current team: Elite Motorsport
- Categorisation: FIA Silver
- Car number: 78
- Starts: 20 (20 entries)
- Wins: 3
- Podiums: 6
- Poles: 2
- Fastest laps: 4
- Best finish: 9th in 2023

Previous series
- 2021–22 2019–20: Ginetta GT4 Supercup; Ginetta Junior Championship

Joshua Paul Rattican (born 21 February 2004) is a British racing driver competing in GT World Challenge Europe for Greystone GT as a McLaren junior.

Having driven in the Ginetta Junior Championship in his formative years, finishing second in 2020, Rattican went on to claim the runner-up spot of the Ginetta GT4 Supercup the following year. He since moved into the GT4 European Series, winning a race at Barcelona in 2023 before experiencing a dominant 2024 season alongside Tom Lebbon.

Rattican is a member of the BRDC's "Rising Stars" programme.

== Racing record ==
=== Racing career summary ===
Season	Series	Team	Races	Wins	Poles	F/Laps	Podiums	Points	Position
2019	Ginetta Junior Championship	In2Racing	10	0	0	0	0	316	9th
2019	Ginetta Junior Championship	R Racing	13	0	0	0	0	316	9th
2020	Ginetta Junior Championship	R Racing	21	4	0	2	15	519	**2nd**
2021	Ginetta GT4 Supercup - Pro	Elite Motorsport	20	2	0	4	14	577	**2nd**
2022	Ginetta GT4 Supercup - Pro	Elite Motorsport	5	0	0	2	1	90	6th
2023	GT4 European Series - Silver	Elite Motorsport with Entire Race Engineering	12	1	1	1	1	55	9th
2024	GT4 European Series - Silver	Elite Motorsport with Entire Race Engineering	12	2	3	3	7	186	**1st**
2025	GT4 Winter Series	Elite Motorsport	6	4	3	3	6	136	6th
2025	GT4 European Series - Silver	Elite Motorsport with Entire Race Engineering							
2025	International GT Open	Greystone GT	5	0	1	0	2	36	10th
2026	GT World Challenge Europe Endurance Cup	Greystone GT	5	0	0	0	0	0	NC

* Season still in progress.

=== Complete Ginetta Junior Championship results ===
(key) (Races in bold indicate pole position) (Races in italics indicate fastest lap)

Year	Team	1	2	3	4	5	6	7	8	9	10	11	12	13	14	15	16	17	18	19	20	21	22	23	24	25	26	27	DC	Points
2019	In2Racing	BHI; 1; 11	BHI; 2; 7	DON; 1; 6	DON; 2; 9	DON; 3; 15	THR1; 1; 8	THR1; 2; 8	CRO; 1 C	CRO; 2 Ret	OUL; 1; 6	OUL; 2; 6																	9th	316
2019	R Racing												SNE; 1; 13	SNE; 2; 12	SNE; 3; 6	SNE; 4; 5	THR2; 1 Ret	THR2; 2; 6	THR2; 3; 6	KNO; 1; 9	KNO; 2; 9	KNO; 3; 11	SIL; 1; 8	SIL; 2; 9	SIL; 3; 7	BHGP; 1; 9	BHGP; 2 Ret	BHGP; 3; 10	9th	316
2020	R Racing	DON; 1; 3	DON; 2; 4	DON; 3 (15)	BHGP; 1; 3	BHGP; 2; 2	BHGP; 3; 3	KNO; 1; 5	KNO; 2; 2	KNO; 3; 1	THR; 1; 2	THR; 2; 1	SIL; 1; 2	SIL; 2; 3	SIL; 3; 4	CRO; 1; 1	CRO; 2; 3	SNE; 1; 21	SNE; 2; 4	SNE; 3; 2	BHI; 1; 1	BHI; 2; 3							2nd	519

=== Complete GT4 European Series results ===
(key) (Races in bold indicate pole position) (Races in italics indicate fastest lap)

Year	Team	Car	Class	1	2	3	4	5	6	7	8	9	10	11	12	Pos	Points
2023	Elite Motorsport with Entire Race Engineering	McLaren Artura GT4	Silver	MNZ; 1; 7	MNZ; 2; 35	LEC; 1 Ret	LEC; 2; 5	SPA; 1; 25	SPA; 2; 40	MIS; 1; 20	MIS; 2; 26	HOC; 1; 5	HOC; 2; 14	CAT; 1; 1	CAT; 2; 37†	9th	55
2024	Elite Motorsport with Entire Race Engineering	McLaren Artura GT4	Silver	LEC; 1; 2	LEC; 2; 3	MIS; 1; 3	MIS; 2; 4	**SPA**; **1**; 1	**SPA**; **2**; 1	HOC; 1; 5	**HOC**; **2**; 4	MNZ; 1; 6	MNZ; 2; 2	JED; 1; 3	JED; 2; 5	1st	186
2025	Elite Motorsport with Entire Race Engineering	McLaren Artura GT4	Silver	LEC; 1; 4	LEC; 2; 36†	ZAN; 1; 6	ZAN; 2 Ret	**SPA**; **1**; 8	**SPA**; **2**; 2	**MIS**; **1**; 5	MIS; 2; 7	NÜR; 1; 1	NÜR; 2 Ret	**CAT**; **1**; 27	**CAT**; **2**; 2	5th	106

=== Complete GT World Challenge Europe results ===
==== GT World Challenge Europe Endurance Cup ====
(key) (Races in bold indicate pole position) (Races in italics indicate fastest lap)

Year	Team	Car	Class	1	2	3	4	5	6	7	Pos.	Points
2026	Greystone GT	McLaren 720S GT3 Evo	Silver	LEC; Ret	MNZ; 42†	SPA; 6H; 34	SPA; 12H; 52	SPA; 24H; 37	NÜR; Ret	ALG; Ret	35th	2
