= Tom Lebbon =

British racing driver (born 2005)

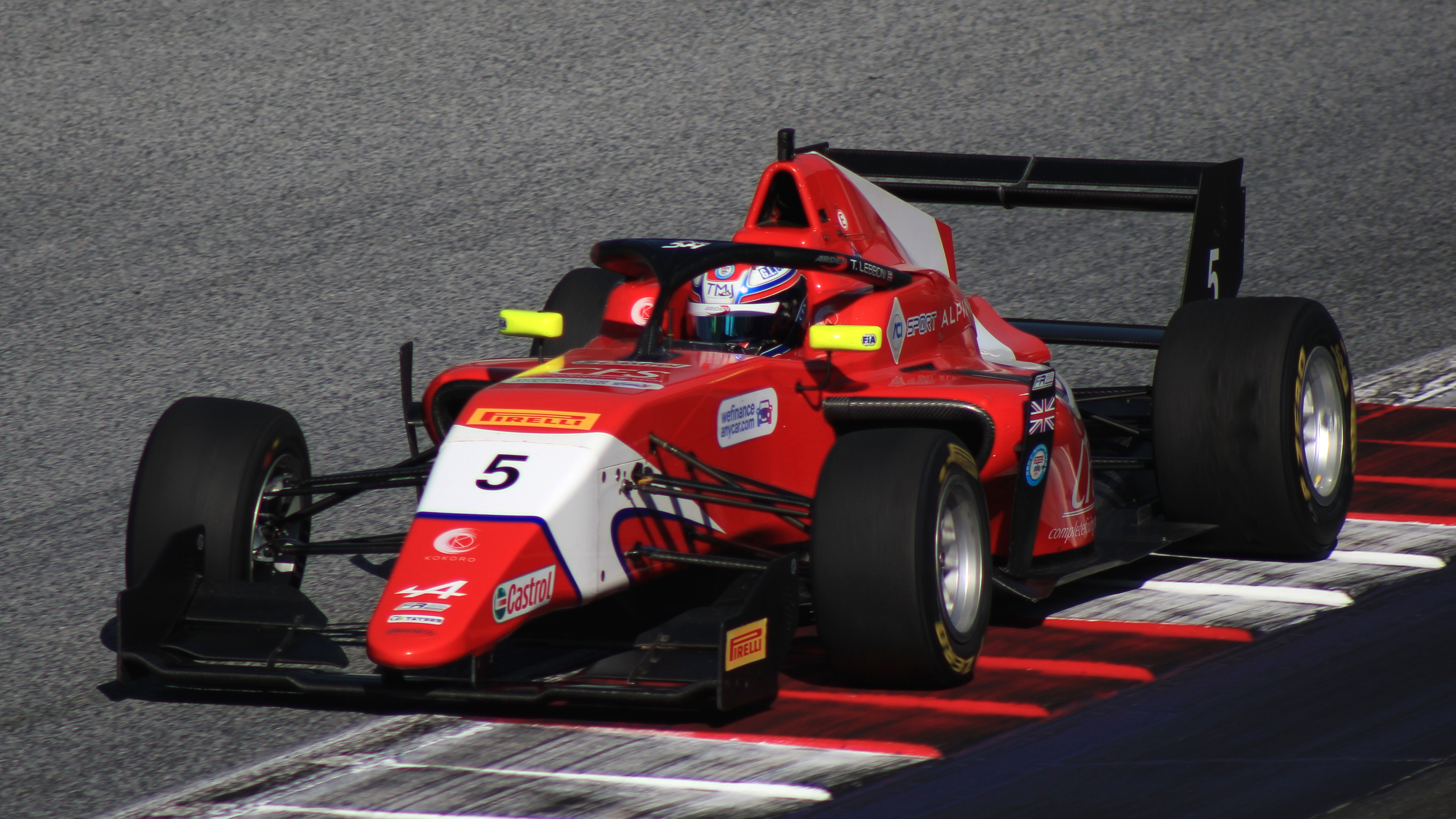
- Racing in the 2023 Formula Regional European Championship at the Red Bull Ring
- Nationality: (United Kingdom) British
- Born: Thomas Jeffrey Beaumont Lebbon; 16 May 2005 (age 21) Bury St Edmunds, United Kingdom

GB3 Championship career
- Debut season: 2021
- Current team: Elite Motorsport
- Categorisation: FIA Silver
- Car number: 34
- Starts: 27 (27 entries)
- Wins: 0
- Podiums: 1
- Poles: 0
- Fastest laps: 0
- Best finish: 9th in 2021

Previous series
- 2020: Ginetta Junior Championship

Championship titles
- 2020: Ginetta Junior Championship

Thomas Jeffrey Beaumont Lebbon (born 16 May 2005) is a British racing driver who is currently competing in the GT4 European Series with Elite Motorsport. He was the champion of the 2020 Ginetta Junior Championship and finished third in the 2022 GB3 Championship.

== Early career ==
Lebbon started competing in national karting competitions in 2016. The Brit would stay in karts until 2019, when he finished second to Joshua McLean in the LGM Series.

After racing in the Ginetta Junior Winter Championship at the end of 2019, Lebbon signed up to race for Elite Motorsport in the 2020 Ginetta Junior Championship. Despite being a series rookie, Lebbon won five races, four of which he won consecutively, and won the title with a nine-point gap to the experienced Josh Rattican. Through that, he became the first ever driver to win the overall championship whilst being classed as a rookie.

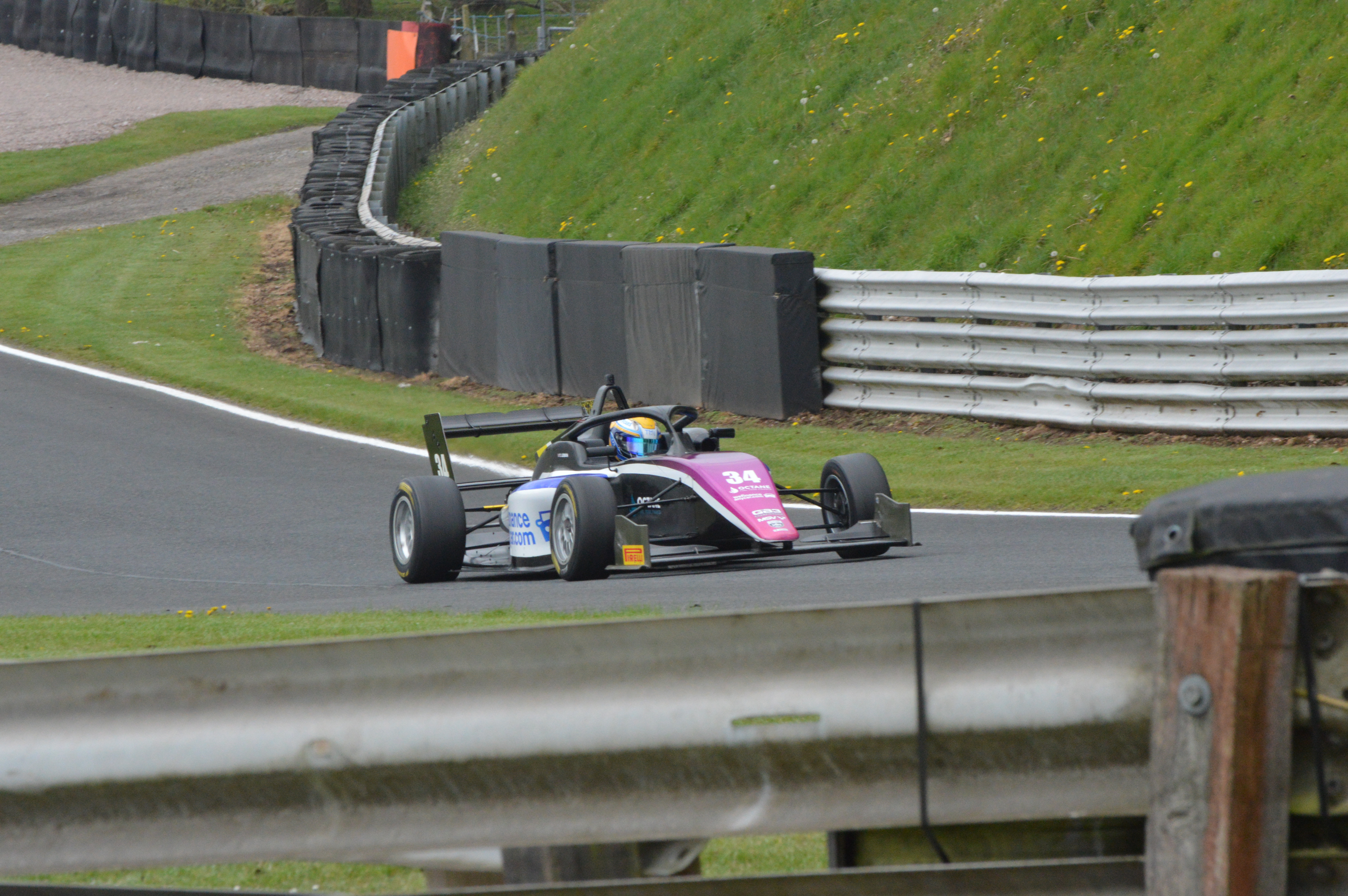
Lebbon racing at Oulton Park during the 2022 GB3 Championship.

For 2021, Lebbon elected to skip Formula 4, the standard entry point for upstarting single-seater drivers, and re-joined Elite Motorsport in the GB3 Championship, partnering Javier Sagrera and José Garfias. Lebbon enjoyed a strong debut campaign, as he regularly finished in the top-ten in races and even scored his first podium in the reversed-grid race at Donington Park. Lebbon remained with Elite Motorsport for the 2022 season. He scored four wins and finished third in the championship. The following year, Lebbon sidestepped to the Formula Regional European Championship, teaming up with Arden Motorsport. However, the season proved to be a struggle and Lebbon failed to score any points throughout the year.

== Sportscar career ==
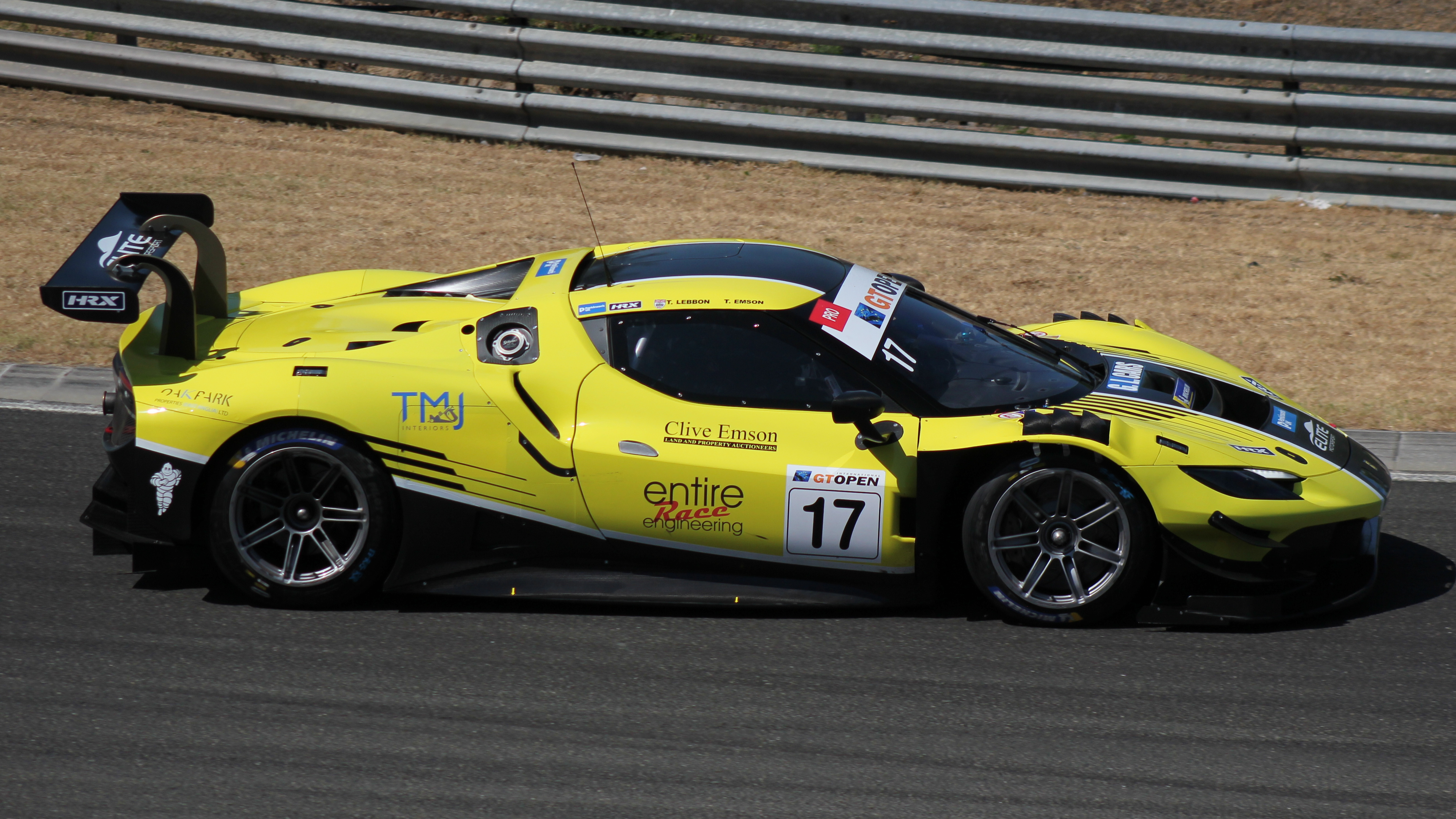
Lebbon racing at the Hungaroring during the 2025 International GT Open.

Having made his GT4 debut at the Hockenheimring at the back end of 2023, Lebbon entered a full season of the GT4 European Series in 2024, partnering former Ginetta title rival Rattican at Elite Motorsport.

== Personal life ==
Lebbon was in a relationship with GB4 Championship driver Chloe Grant until late 2025. Lebbon attended Culford School, located near Bury St. Edmunds.

== Karting record ==
=== Karting career summary ===
Season	Series	Team	Position
2016	Super 1 National Championship — Cadet		13th
2016	British Open Championship — Cadet		9th
2018	LGM Series — Junior X30		8th
2018	IAME Euro Series — X30 Junior		13th
2019	LGM Series — Junior X30		2nd
2019	IAME Euro Series — X30 Junior	MLR	4th
2019	Motorsport UK Kartmasters Grand Prix — X30 Junior	MLR	29th
2019	British Kart Championship — X30 Junior	MLR	7th
2019	IAME International Final — X30 Junior	MLR	NC

== Racing record ==
=== Racing career summary ===
Season	Series	Team	Races	Wins	Poles	F/Laps	Podiums	Points	Position
2019	Ginetta Junior Winter Championship	Elite Motorsport	4	0	0	0	0	0	NC
2020	Ginetta Junior Championship	Elite Motorsport	21	5	5	2	15	528	**1st**
2021	GB3 Championship	Elite Motorsport	24	0	0	0	1	288	9th
2022	GB3 Championship	Elite Motorsport	24	4	1	1	5	363.5	**3rd**
2023	Formula Regional European Championship	Arden Motorsport	20	0	0	0	0	0	27th
2023	GT4 European Series - Silver	Elite Motorsport with Entire Race Engineering	2	0	0	0	0	0	NC
2024	GT4 Winter Series	Elite Motorsport	18	4	4	5	12	271	**3rd**
2024	French GT4 Cup - Silver	Elite Motorsport with Entire Race Engineering	2	0	1	0	1	28	12th
2024	GT4 European Series - Silver	Elite Motorsport with Entire Race Engineering	12	2	3	1	7	186	**1st**
2025	GT4 Winter Series	Elite Motorsport	9	2	1	1	8	167	5th
2025	International GT Open	Elite Motorsport with Entire Race Engineering	14	1	1	2	5	123	4th
2025	GT World Challenge Europe Endurance Cup	2 Seas Motorsport	2	0	0	0	0	0	NC
2026	International GT Open	Elite Motorsport with Entire Race Engineering	14	5	3	2	8	148	**1st**

* Season still in progress.

=== Complete Ginetta Junior Championship results ===
(key) (Races in bold indicate pole position) (Races in italics indicate fastest lap)

Year	Team	1	2	3	4	5	6	7	8	9	10	11	12	13	14	15	16	17	18	19	20	21	DC	Points
2020	Elite Motorsport	**DON**; **1**; 5	**DON**; **2**; 2	DON; 3; 9	**BHGP**; **1**; 2	BHGP; 2; 3	BHGP; 3; 1	KNO; 1; 2	KNO; 2; 3	KNO; 3; 2	**THR**; **1**; 3	**THR**; **2**; 2	SIL; 1; 11	SIL; 2 Ret	SIL; 3 (13)	**CRO**; **1**; 2	**CRO**; **2**; 1	SNE; 1; 1	SNE; 2; 1	**SNE**; **3**; 1	BHI; 1; 2	BHI; 2; 2	1st	528

=== Complete GB3 Championship results ===
(key) (Races in bold indicate pole position) (Races in italics indicate fastest lap)

Year	Team	1	2	3	4	5	6	7	8	9	10	11	12	13	14	15	16	17	18	19	20	21	22	23	24	DC	Points
2021	Elite Motorsport	BRH; 1; 9	BRH; 2; 7	BRH; 3; 10^{1}	SIL1; 1 Ret	SIL1; 2; 8	SIL1; 3; 6^{2}	DON1; 1; 6	DON1; 2; 10	DON1; 3; 3^{7}	SPA; 1; 4	SPA; 2; 8	SPA; 3; 12	SNE; 1; 16	SNE; 2; 4	SNE; 3; 5^{4}	SIL2; 1; 14	SIL2; 2; 14	SIL2; 3; 5^{2}	OUL; 1; 10	OUL; 2; 7	OUL; 3; 8	DON2; 1; 5	DON2; 2; 20	DON2; 3; 5^{8}	9th	288
2022	Elite Motorsport	OUL; 1; 14	OUL; 2; 6	OUL; 3 DSQ	SIL1; 1; 3	SIL1; 2; 1	SIL1; 3; 13^{6}	DON1; 1; 5	DON1; 2; 8	DON1; 3; 14	SNE; 1; 5	SNE; 2; 5	SNE; 3; 20	SPA; 1; 6	SPA; 2 Ret	SPA; 3; 12^{1}	SIL2; 1; 6	SIL2; 2; 1	SIL2; 3; 13^{3}	BRH; 1; 6	**BRH**; **2**; 1	BRH; 3; 18	DON2; 1; 4	DON2; 2; 1	DON2; 3; 12^{7}	3rd	363.5

=== Complete Formula Regional European Championship results ===
(key) (Races in bold indicate pole position) (Races in italics indicate fastest lap)

Year	Team	1	2	3	4	5	6	7	8	9	10	11	12	13	14	15	16	17	18	19	20	DC	Points
2023	Arden Motorsport	IMO; 1; 30	IMO; 2; 23	CAT; 1; 27	CAT; 2; 25	HUN; 1; 25	HUN; 2; 23	SPA; 1; 18	SPA; 2; 31	MUG; 1; 21	MUG; 2; 20	LEC; 1; 17	LEC; 2; 22	RBR; 1; 14	RBR; 2; 15	MNZ; 1; 12	MNZ; 2; 32	ZAN; 1; 20	ZAN; 2; 18	HOC; 1; 21	HOC; 2; 22	27th	0

=== Complete GT4 European Series results ===
(key) (Races in bold indicate pole position) (Races in italics indicate fastest lap)

Year	Team	Car	Class	1	2	3	4	5	6	7	8	9	10	11	12	Pos.	Points
2023	Elite Motorsport with Entire Race Engineering	McLaren Artura GT4	Silver	MNZ; 1	MNZ; 2	LEC; 1	LEC; 2	SPA; 1	SPA; 2	MIS; 1	MIS; 2	HOC; 1; 29	HOC; 2; 23	CAT; 1	CAT; 2	NC	0
2024	Elite Motorsport with Entire Race Engineering	McLaren Artura GT4	Silver	LEC; 1; 2	LEC; 2; 3	MIS; 1; 3	MIS; 2; 4	**SPA**; **1**; 1	**SPA**; **2**; 1	HOC; 1; 5	**HOC**; **2**; 4	MNZ; 1; 6	MNZ; 2; 2	**JED**; **1**; 3	JED; 2; 5	1st	186

=== Complete International GT Open results ===
(key) (Races in bold indicate pole position) (Races in italics indicate fastest lap)

Year	Team	Car	Class	1	2	3	4	5	6	7	8	9	10	11	12	13	14	Pos.	Points
2025	Elite Motorsport with Entire Race Engineering	Ferrari 296 GT3	Pro	ALG; 1; 5	ALG; 2; 3	SPA; 7	HOC; 1; 3	HOC; 2; 4	**HUN**; **1**; 1	HUN; 2; 4	LEC; 1; 5	LEC; 2; 4	RBR; 1; 25	RBR; 2; 2	CAT; 1 Ret	CAT; 2; 4	MNZ; 2	4th	123
2026	Elite Motorsport with Entire Race Engineering	Ferrari 296 GT3 Evo	Pro	ALG; 1; 4	ALG; 2; 3	SPA; 2	MIS; 1; 1	**MIS**; **2**; 1	HUN; 1; 25†	**HUN**; **2**; 1	LEC; 1 Ret	**LEC**; **2**; 1	HOC; 1; 6	HOC; 2; 1	MNZ; 4	CAT; 1; 14	CAT; 2; 3	1st	148
