= 2024 Ginetta Junior Championship =

British one make automobile racing championship

The 2024 Michelin Ginetta Junior Championship was a multi-event, one make motor racing championship held across England. The championship included a mix of professional teams and privately funded drivers, aged between 14 and 17, competing in Ginetta G40s that conformed to the technical regulations for the championship.

== Teams and drivers ==
Team	No.	Driver	Rounds
MDD Racing	4	(United Kingdom) James Ellis	All
MDD Racing	21	(United Kingdom) Jovarni Cassell Joseph	1–3
MDD Racing	31	(United Kingdom) Felix Livesey	All
R Racing	5	(United Kingdom) Thomas Ingram Hill	All
R Racing	25	(United Kingdom) Ethan Jeff-Hall	All
R Racing	27	(United Kingdom) Alfie Slater	2–8
R Racing	28	(United Kingdom) Harry Moss	All
R Racing	67	(Norway) Marcus Sæter	All
R Racing	90	(United Kingdom) Chase Fernandez	3–8
Elite Motorsport	7	(Isle of Man) Nick Ellis	1–5
Elite Motorsport	11	(Australia) Ruben Dan	All
Elite Motorsport	34	(United Kingdom) Max Cuthbert	1–3
Elite Motorsport	35	(United Kingdom) Isaac Phelps	All
Elite Motorsport	43	(United Kingdom) Archie Clark	All
Elite Motorsport	50	(United Kingdom) Charlie Hart	All
Fox Motorsport	17	(United Kingdom) James Shotton	1–5
Fox Motorsport	23	(United Kingdom) Holly Miall	All
Fox Motorsport	45	(United Kingdom) Jack Robinson	All
Fox Motorsport	75	(Republic of Ireland) Colin Cronin	All
Pace Performance	18	(United Kingdom) Torrin Byrne	All
Pace Performance	19	(South Africa) Mahlori Mabunda	2, 4–6
Pace Performance	20	(South Africa) Ntiyiso Mabunda	2, 4–6
Preptech UK	26	(United Kingdom) Henry Joslyn	All
Preptech UK	53	(United States) Ethan Carney	All
Preptech UK	74	(United Kingdom) Alfie Davies	1–6
E3 Sport	70	(United Kingdom) Jude Peters	All
E3 Sport	90	(United Kingdom) Chase Fernandez	1–2

== Race calendar ==
All rounds are scheduled to run alongside the British GT Championship apart from the round at Anglesey.

Round	Circuit	Date	Map of circuit locations
1	(United Kingdom) Oulton Park, Cheshire (International Circuit)	30 March – 1 April	2024 Ginetta Junior Championship (England)
2	(United Kingdom) Silverstone, Northamptonshire (Grand Prix Circuit)	27–28 April	2024 Ginetta Junior Championship (England)
3	(United Kingdom) Donington Park, Leicestershire (Grand Prix Circuit)	25–26 May	2024 Ginetta Junior Championship (England)
4	(United Kingdom) Anglesey Circuit, Anglesey	29–30 June	2024 Ginetta Junior Championship (England)
5	(United Kingdom) Snetterton, Norfolk (300 Circuit)	13–14 July	2024 Ginetta Junior Championship (England)
6	(United Kingdom) Silverstone, Northamptonshire (National Circuit)	17–18 August	2024 Ginetta Junior Championship (England)
7	(United Kingdom) Donington Park, Leicestershire (Grand Prix Circuit)	7–8 September	2024 Ginetta Junior Championship (England)
8	(United Kingdom) Brands Hatch, Kent (Grand Prix Circuit)	28–29 September	2024 Ginetta Junior Championship (England)

== Race results ==
Round		Circuit	Date	Pole position	Fastest lap	Winning driver	Winning team	Rookie Winner
1	R1	Oulton Park, Cheshire (International Circuit)	30 March – 1 April	(United Kingdom) Ethan Jeff-Hall	(United Kingdom) Henry Joslyn	(United Kingdom) Ethan Jeff-Hall	R Racing	(United Kingdom) Ethan Jeff-Hall
1	R2	Oulton Park, Cheshire (International Circuit)	30 March – 1 April	(United Kingdom) Ethan Jeff-Hall	(United Kingdom) Chase Fernandez	(United Kingdom) Isaac Phelps	Elite Motorsport	(United Kingdom) Isaac Phelps
1	R3	Oulton Park, Cheshire (International Circuit)	30 March – 1 April		(United Kingdom) Isaac Phelps	(United Kingdom) Isaac Phelps	Elite Motorsport	(United Kingdom) Isaac Phelps
2	R1	Silverstone, Northamptonshire (Grand Prix Circuit)	27 – 28 April	(United Kingdom) Henry Joslyn	(United Kingdom) Ethan Jeff-Hall	(United Kingdom) Henry Joslyn	Preptech UK	(United Kingdom) James Shotton
2	R2	Silverstone, Northamptonshire (Grand Prix Circuit)	27 – 28 April	(United Kingdom) Charlie Hart	(United Kingdom) Isaac Phelps	(Norway) Marcus Sæter	R Racing	(Norway) Marcus Sæter
2	R3	Silverstone, Northamptonshire (Grand Prix Circuit)	27 – 28 April		(United Kingdom) Henry Joslyn	(United Kingdom) Ethan Jeff-Hall	R Racing	(United Kingdom) Ethan Jeff-Hall
3	R1	Donington Park, Leicestershire (Grand Prix Circuit)	25 – 26 May	(United Kingdom) Chase Fernandez	(United Kingdom) Charlie Hart	(United Kingdom) Henry Joslyn	Preptech UK	(United Kingdom) Ethan Jeff-Hall
3	R2	Donington Park, Leicestershire (Grand Prix Circuit)	25 – 26 May	(United Kingdom) Henry Joslyn	(United Kingdom) Isaac Phelps	(United Kingdom) Henry Joslyn	Preptech UK	(Norway) Marcus Sæter
3	R3	Donington Park, Leicestershire (Grand Prix Circuit)	25 – 26 May		(United Kingdom) Isaac Phelps	(United Kingdom) Chase Fernandez	R Racing	(United Kingdom) Isaac Phelps
4	R1	Anglesey Circuit, Anglesey	29 – 30 June	(United Kingdom) Ethan Jeff-Hall	(United Kingdom) Ethan Jeff-Hall	(United Kingdom) Ethan Jeff-Hall	R Racing	(United Kingdom) Ethan Jeff-Hall
4	R2	Anglesey Circuit, Anglesey	29 – 30 June	(United Kingdom) Ethan Jeff-Hall	(Norway) Marcus Sæter	(Norway) Marcus Sæter	R Racing	(Norway) Marcus Sæter
4	R3	Anglesey Circuit, Anglesey	29 – 30 June	(United Kingdom) Ethan Jeff-Hall	(United Kingdom) Ethan Jeff-Hall	(United Kingdom) Ethan Jeff-Hall	R Racing	(United Kingdom) Ethan Jeff-Hall
4	R4	Anglesey Circuit, Anglesey	29 – 30 June	(United Kingdom) Ethan Jeff-Hall	(United Kingdom) Ethan Jeff-Hall	(United Kingdom) Ethan Jeff-Hall	R Racing	(United Kingdom) Ethan Jeff-Hall
5	R1	Snetterton, Norfolk (300 Circuit)	13 – 14 July	(United Kingdom) Alfie Slater	(United Kingdom) Chase Fernandez	(United Kingdom) Chase Fernandez	R Racing	(United Kingdom) Ethan Jeff-Hall
5	R2	Snetterton, Norfolk (300 Circuit)	13 – 14 July	(United Kingdom) Chase Fernandez	(United Kingdom) Ethan Jeff-Hall	(United Kingdom) Chase Fernandez	R Racing	(United Kingdom) Ethan Jeff-Hall
5	R3	Snetterton, Norfolk (300 Circuit)	13 – 14 July		(United Kingdom) Henry Joslyn	(United Kingdom) Chase Fernandez	R Racing	(United Kingdom) Ethan Jeff-Hall
6	R1	Silverstone, Northamptonshire (National Circuit)	17 – 18 August	(United Kingdom) Chase Fernandez	(United Kingdom) Archie Clark	(United Kingdom) Ethan Jeff-Hall	R Racing	(United Kingdom) Ethan Jeff-Hall
6	R2	Silverstone, Northamptonshire (National Circuit)	17 – 18 August	(United Kingdom) Ethan Jeff-Hall	(United Kingdom) Archie Clark	(United Kingdom) Chase Fernandez	R Racing	(United Kingdom) Ethan Jeff-Hall
6	R3	Silverstone, Northamptonshire (National Circuit)	17 – 18 August		(United Kingdom) Ethan Jeff-Hall	(United Kingdom) Charlie Hart	Elite Motorsport	(United Kingdom) Archie Clark
7	R1	Donington Park, Leicestershire (Grand Prix Circuit)	7 – 8 September	(United Kingdom) Chase Fernandez	(United Kingdom) Ethan Jeff-Hall	(Republic of Ireland) Colin Cronin	Fox Motorsport	(Republic of Ireland) Colin Cronin
7	R2	Donington Park, Leicestershire (Grand Prix Circuit)	7 – 8 September	(United Kingdom) Chase Fernandez	(United Kingdom) Ethan Jeff-Hall	(United Kingdom) Chase Fernandez	R Racing	(United Kingdom) Ethan Jeff-Hall
7	R3	Donington Park, Leicestershire (Grand Prix Circuit)	7 – 8 September		(United Kingdom) Ethan Jeff-Hall	(United Kingdom) Chase Fernandez	R Racing	(United Kingdom) Ethan Jeff-Hall
8	R1	Brands Hatch, Kent (Grand Prix Circuit)	28 – 29 September	(United Kingdom) Isaac Phelps	(United Kingdom) Chase Fernandez	(United Kingdom) Isaac Phelps	Elite Motorsport	(United Kingdom) Isaac Phelps
8	R2	Brands Hatch, Kent (Grand Prix Circuit)	28 – 29 September	(United Kingdom) Isaac Phelps	(United Kingdom) Archie Clark	(United Kingdom) Charlie Hart	Elite Motorsport	(United Kingdom) Isaac Phelps
8	R3	Brands Hatch, Kent (Grand Prix Circuit)	28 – 29 September		(United Kingdom) Chase Fernandez	(United Kingdom) Henry Joslyn	Preptech UK	(Norway) Marcus Sæter

== Championship standings ==
Points system
**1st**	**2nd**	**3rd**	**4th**	**5th**	**6th**	**7th**	**8th**	**9th**	**10th**	**11th**	**12th**	**13th**	**14th**	**15th**	**16th**	**17th**	**18th**	**19th**	**20th**	R1 PP	FL
35	30	26	22	20	18	16	14	12	11	10	9	8	7	6	5	4	3	2	1	1	1

=== Drivers' championship ===
Pos	Driver	OUL			SIL1			DON1			ANG				SNE			SIL2			DON2			BRA			Total	Drop	Pen.	Points
1	(United Kingdom) Ethan Jeff-Hall **(R)**	**1**	**7**	5	6	5	1	4	5	8	**1**	**2**	**1**	**1**	2	2	2	1	**2**	4	3	3	2	4	9	DNS	628	12	-9	607
2	(United Kingdom) Chase Fernandez	5	3	3	3	4	8	**2**	2	1	11	9	6	2	1	**1**	1	**17**	1	2	**Ret**	**1**	1	6	3	3	605	6	-9	590
3	(United Kingdom) Charlie Hart	2	2	2	2	**2**	6	3	4	6	3	6	4	6	3	6	5	2	5	1	6	8	13	18	1	2	568	11		557
4	(United Kingdom) Henry Joslyn	12	5	4	**1**	3	3	1	**1**	2	4	3	9	3	DSQ	3	4	5	10	5	4	2	14	2	4	1	565	17	-12	536
5	(United Kingdom) Isaac Phelps **(R)**	3	1	1	5	7	5	8	6	3	6	4	11	4	14	8	Ret	3	3	6	Ret	4	4	**1**	**2**	7	503			503
6	(Norway) Marcus Sæter **(R)**	4	22	13	13	1	2	5	3	4	2	1	2	15	6	5	3	4	4	8	2	7	12	5	5	4	502	6	-6	490
7	(United Kingdom) Archie Clark **(R)**	6	6	6	7	6	9	6	7	5	5	5	5	9	5	11	Ret	8	6	3	5	6	3	7	6	15	421	6		415
8	(Australia) Ruben Dan **(R)**	15	4	7	12	8	7	14	13	9	7	11	10	16	11	22	13	7	8	10	Ret	9	7	9	7	5	283	4	-9	270
9	(United Kingdom) Alfie Slater **(R)**				Ret	12	Ret	9	14	Ret	18	12	16	5	**4**	4	6	13	7	7	8	Ret	6	3	8	6	251	6	-9	242
10	(Republic of Ireland) Colin Cronin **(R)**	16	16	Ret	8	11	15	13	Ret	14	15	21	Ret	10	8	7	8	14	13	13	1	5	9	12	11	12	229		-6	223
11	(United Kingdom) Thomas Ingram Hill **(R)**	10	8	9	9	15	13	17	18	13	8	8	13	17	17	9	12	9	11	12	9	13	11	14	16	13	220	7		213
12	(United Kingdom) Jude Peters **(R)**	17	12	12	16	Ret	16	11	9	10	13	10	7	11	16	Ret	Ret	10	12	17	7	10	8	8	10	9	211		-6	211
13	(United Kingdom) James Shotton **(R)**	14	10	21	4	9	4	7	11	11	9	15	3	7	7	20	9										195			195
14	(United Kingdom) Felix Livesey	11	Ret	10	14	Ret	18	16	Ret	12	19	Ret	8	8	12	12	7	11	14	9	DSQ	11	5	10	14	8	194		-12	182
15	(United Kingdom) Torrin Byrne **(R)**	7	13	15	15	13	12	19	15	17	22	16	15	14	Ret	10	Ret	12	17	14	14	12	16	13	13	10	162			162
16	(United Kingdom) Harry Moss	13	8	17	11	14	20	15	8	7	10	7	14	19	9	13	15	20	21	21	13	Ret	15	15	17	16	166		-15	151
17	(United States) Ethan Carney **(R)**	21	17	16	18	18	21	18	17	16	14	13	17	18	20	15	10	6	9	11	10	14	18	16	15	14	142			142
18	(United Kingdom) Alfie Davies **(R)**	9	11	8	17	17	11	10	10	Ret	16	17	18	13	10	14	Ret	21	16	16							124			124
19	(Isle of Man) Nick Ellis **(R)**	8	14	20	10	10	10	12	12	22	12	14	12	12	13	Ret	14										118		-6	112
20	(United Kingdom) James Ellis **(R)**	22	21	19	22	21	22	22	19	20	24	20	21	21	22	16	16	16	18	15	11	15	10	11	12	11	82			82
21	(United Kingdom) Jack Robinson **(R)**	19	20	14	20	19	14	21	Ret	18	17	23	20	22	15	17	11	18	20	19	15	16	17	17	DNS	17	73		-9	64
22	(United Kingdom) Holly Miall	20	18	18	21	22	23	23	16	19	20	18	19	20	18	18	19	19	15	18	12	17	19	19	18	18	61			61
23	(United Kingdom) Max Cuthbert **(R)**	18	15	11	19	16	17	20	20	15																	38			38
24	(South Africa) Ntiyiso Mabunda **(R)**				23	20	19				21	19	22	23	19	19	17	15	19	20							18			18
25	(United Kingdom) Jovarni Cassell Joseph **(R)**	23	19	Ret	24	23	24	24	DSQ	21																	2			2
26	(South Africa) Mahlori Mabunda **(R)**				Ret	24	DNS				23	22	23	24	21	21	18	WD	WD	WD							0			0

Colour	Result
Gold	Winner
Silver	Second place
Bronze	Third place
Green	Points classification
Blue	Non-points classification
Blue	Non-classified finish (NC)
Purple	Retired, not classified (Ret)
Red	Did not qualify (DNQ)
Red	Did not pre-qualify (DNPQ)
Black	Disqualified (DSQ)
White	Did not start (DNS)
White	Withdrew (WD)
White	Race cancelled (C)
Blank	Did not practice (DNP)
Blank	Did not arrive (DNA)
Blank	Excluded (EX)

**Bold** – Pole

Italics – Fastest Lap

† — Did not finish, but classified (completed more than 75% of race distance)

**(R)** - Rookie

== Ginetta Junior Winter Series ==
The 2024 Ginetta Junior Winter Series was a multi-event race weekend across the 2nd and 3rd November at the Silverstone circuit the same weekend as the HSCC Walter Hayes Trophy.

=== Teams and drivers ===
Team	No.	Driver
MDD Racing	4	(United Kingdom) James Ellis
MDD Racing	31	(United Kingdom) Felix Livesey
MDD Racing	95	(United Kingdom) Hamish Forrest
R Racing	8	(Sweden) Scott Lindblom
R Racing	23	(Netherlands) Rocco Coronel
R Racing	27	(United Kingdom) Alfie Slater
R Racing	34	(United Kingdom) Max Cuthbert
R Racing	55	(United Kingdom) Jarrett Clark
Fox Motorsport	11	(United Kingdom) Henry Cameron
Fox Motorsport	75	(Republic of Ireland) Colin Cronin
Elite Motorsport	15	(United Kingdom) Joseph Smith
Elite Motorsport	22	(United Kingdom) Josh Watts
Elite Motorsport	35	(United Kingdom) Isaac Phelps
Elite Motorsport	53	(United States) Ethan Carney

=== Championship standings ===
Points system
**1st**	**2nd**	**3rd**	**4th**	**5th**	**6th**	**7th**	**8th**	**9th**	**10th**	**11th**	**12th**	**13th**	**14th**	**15th**	**16th**	**17th**	**18th**	**19th**	**20th**	R1 PP	FL
35	30	26	22	20	18	16	14	12	11	10	9	8	7	6	5	4	3	2	1	1	1

==== Drivers' championship ====
Pos	Driver	SIL			Points
1	(United Kingdom) Isaac Phelps	1	**1**	5	90
2	(Republic of Ireland) Colin Cronin	2	5	1	85
3	(United Kingdom) Alfie Slater	3	2	3	82
4	(United Kingdom) Joseph Smith **(R)**	5	4	2	72
5	(United Kingdom) Max Cuthbert **(R)**	**4**	3	4	72
6	(United Kingdom) James Ellis	7	8	6	48
7	(Netherlands) Rocco Coronel **(R)**	6	6	11	46
8	(United Kingdom) Josh Watts	8	10	8	39
9	(United States) Ethan Carney	10	7	12	36
10	(United Kingdom) Hamish Forrest **(R)**	14	12	7	32
11	(United Kingdom) Felix Livesey	9	9	14	31
12	(United Kingdom) Jarrett Clark **(R)**	11	11	10	31
13	(United Kingdom) Henry Cameron **(R)**	12	13	9	29
14	(Sweden) Scott Lindblom **(R)**	13	Ret	13	16

Colour	Result
Gold	Winner
Silver	Second place
Bronze	Third place
Green	Points classification
Blue	Non-points classification
Blue	Non-classified finish (NC)
Purple	Retired, not classified (Ret)
Red	Did not qualify (DNQ)
Red	Did not pre-qualify (DNPQ)
Black	Disqualified (DSQ)
White	Did not start (DNS)
White	Withdrew (WD)
White	Race cancelled (C)
Blank	Did not practice (DNP)
Blank	Did not arrive (DNA)
Blank	Excluded (EX)

**Bold** – Pole

Italics – Fastest Lap

† — Did not finish, but classified (completed more than 75% of race distance)

**(R)** - Rookie
