= Isaac Phelps (racing driver) =

British racing driver (born 2009)

- Phelps in 2026
- Born: Isaac Phelps; 14 May 2009 (age 17); Berkhamsted, United Kingdom
- Nationality: (United Kingdom) British

Championship titles
- 2024: Ginetta Junior Winter Series

Isaac Phelps (born 14 May 2009) is a British racing driver who last competed in Porsche Carrera Cup Great Britain for Rosland Gold Racing by Century Motorsport.

== Career ==
Phelps started karting in 2020 and continued karting until 2023, most notably winning the 2021 Shenington Kart Racing Club title in the Mini X class. Stepping up to car racing in 2024, Phelps joined Elite Motorsport to race in the Ginetta Junior Championship. In the season-opening round at Oulton Park, Phelps finished third in race one before winning the other two races. Phelps then scored just three podiums in the following six rounds, before taking his third and final win of the season in race one at the season-ending round at Brands Hatch. At the end of the year, Phelps participated in the Ginetta Junior Winter Series, in which he took two wins and took the title by edging out Colin Cronin by five points.

The following year, Phelps remained with Elite Motorsport to step up to drive in the GB4 Championship. In the season-opening round at Donington Park, Phelps won race one and finished second in race two before finishing 19th in race three after a first-lap accident and leaving the round second in points. In the following round at Silverstone, Phelps took his second win of the season in race two to remain second in points after finishing fifth and 12th in the other two races. Phelps then finished no higher than fourth at Oulton Park, before taking his fourth podium of the season at Snetterton by finishing second in race one. A difficult round at Silverstone then ensued, with Phelps finishing seventh, sixth and fifth in the three races and entering the final two rounds third in points. In the second-to-last round at Brands Hatch, Phelps won both races while race three was cancelled, to climb up to second in the standings ahead of the season-finale at Donington Park. Phelps then took pole for the first two races at Donington, but finished no higher than fourth throughout the weekend as he ended the year runner-up to Ary Bansal by 11 points. At the end of the year, Phelps made his debut in GB3 for the same team at the season-ending Monza round.

The following year, Phelps switched to sportscar racing as he joined Rosland Gold Racing by Century Motorsport to compete in Porsche Carrera Cup Great Britain. In his first season in sportscar racing, Phelps took a lone win at Silverstone, as well as seven other podiums to secure third in the Pro standings.

== Karting record ==
=== Karting career summary ===
Season	Series	Team	Position
2020	Shenington Kart Racing Club – Mini X		7th
2021	Shenington Kart Racing Club – Mini X		1st
2021	British Kart Championship – X30 Mini	Jade Racing Team	15th
2022	Shenington Kart Racing Club – X30 Junior		5th
2023	British Kart Championship – X30 Junior	Jamie Green Racing	29th
2023	IAME Euro Series – X30 Junior	Jamie Green Racing	13th
2023	Shenington Kart Racing Club – X30 Junior		17th

== Racing record ==
=== Racing career summary ===
Season	Series	Team	Races	Wins	Poles	F/Laps	Podiums	Points	Position
2024	Ginetta Junior Championship	Elite Motorsport	21	3	0	4	8	503	5th
2024	Ginetta Junior Winter Series	Elite Motorsport	3	2	1	0	2	90	**1st**
2025	GB4 Championship	Elite Motorsport	21	4	5	4	6	391	**2nd**
2025	GB3 Championship	Elite Motorsport	3	0	0	0	0	0	NC†
2026	Porsche Carrera Cup Great Britain – Pro	Rosland Gold Racing by Century Motorsport	16	1	1	1	8	99	**3rd**

=== Complete Ginetta Junior Championship results ===
(key) (Races in bold indicate pole position) (Races in italics indicate fastest lap)

Year	Team	1	2	3	4	5	6	7	8	9	10	11	12	13	14	15	16	17	18	19	20	21	22	23	24	25	DC	Points
2024	Elite Motorsport	OUL; 1; 3	OUL; 2; 1	OUL; 3; 1	SIL1; 1; 5	SIL1; 2; 7	SIL1; 3; 5	DON1; 1; 8	DON1; 2; 6	DON1; 3; 3	ANG; 1; 6	ANG; 2; 4	ANG; 3; 11	ANG; 4; 4	SNE; 1; 14	SNE; 2; 8	SNE; 3 Ret	SIL2; 1; 3	SIL2; 2; 3	SIL2; 3; 6	DON2; 1 Ret	DON2; 2; 4	DON2; 3; 4	**BRH**; **1**; 1	**BRH**; **2**; 2	BRH; 3; 7	5th	503

=== Complete GB4 Championship results ===
(key) (Races in bold indicate pole position) (Races in italics indicate fastest lap)

Year	Entrant	1	2	3	4	5	6	7	8	9	10	11	12	13	14	15	16	17	18	19	20	21	22	DC	Points
2025	Elite Motorsport	**DON**; **1**; 1	**DON**; **2**; 2	DON; 3; 19	SIL1; 1; 5	SIL1; 2; 1	SIL1; 3; 12	OUL; 1; 17	OUL; 2; 4	OUL; 3; 22	SNE; 1; 2	SNE; 2; 4	SNE; 3; 9^{2}	SIL2; 1; 7	SIL2; 2; 6	SIL2; 3; 5^{1}	**BRH**; **1**; 1	**BRH**; **2**; 1	BRH; 3 C	**DON2**; **1**; 9	**DON2**; **2**; 4	DON2; 3; 4^{8}	DON2; 4; 5^{6}	2nd	391

=== Complete GB3 Championship results ===
(key) (Races in bold indicate pole position) (Races in italics indicate fastest lap)

Year	Team	1	2	3	4	5	6	7	8	9	10	11	12	13	14	15	16	17	18	19	20	21	22	23	24	DC	Points
2025	Elite Motorsport	SIL1; 1	SIL1; 2	SIL1; 3	ZAN; 1	ZAN; 2	ZAN; 3	SPA; 1	SPA; 2	SPA; 3	HUN; 1	HUN; 2	HUN; 3	SIL2; 1	SIL2; 2	SIL2; 3	BRH; 1	BRH; 2	BRH; 3	DON; 1	DON; 2	DON; 3	MNZ; 1 Ret	MNZ; 2; 11	MNZ; 3; 16	NC†	0†
