= Charlie Hart =

British racing driver (born 2008)

- Nationality: (United Kingdom) British
- Born: 26 August 2008 (age 18) Rivington, England
- Categorisation: FIA Silver

Championship titles
- 2026: GT4 European Series – Silver

Charlie Hart (born 26 August 2008) is a British racing driver who last competed in the GT4 European Series for Elite Motorsport with Entire Race Engineering.

== Personal life ==
Hart is the son of Chris Hart, a former racing driver.

== Career ==
Hart began testing karts at the age of six with Sam Pollitt Racing, before making his competitive debut two years later. During his karting career, Hart most notably finished sixth in the 2022 British Kart Championships' Junior Max standings, which gave him an invitation to the RMC Grand Finals.

Towards the end of 2022, Hart made his car racing debut for Elite Motorsport in the Ginetta Junior Winter Series. Staying with Elite for the main Ginetta Junior Championship in 2023, Hart finished second on debut at Oulton Park, before taking three other podiums en route to a seventh-place points finish. Continuing with Elite through 2024, Hart won at Silverstone and Brands Hatch, as well as scoring ten other podiums to end the year third overall.

In 2025, Hart stepped up to GT4 competition, joining RAFA Racing by Race Lab to drive a McLaren Artura GT4 in the GT4 Winter Series and GT4 European Series alongside Callum Davies. In the former, Hart took wins at Algarve and Barcelona to end the winter third in the Pro standings. In the latter, he scored a lone podium at Barcelona to end the year 10th among the Silver Cup entrants. Reuniting with Elite Motorsport for 2026, Hart began the year with two wins on a one-off outing in the GT4 Winter Series at Barcelona. Hart then linked up with McKenzy Cresswell for his second season in the GT4 European Series, as a new member of the Elite McLaren Talent Pathway. After taking pole at Spa and finishing second in both races, Hart broke through at Misano to clinch his maiden series win in race one. Following that, Hart won both races at Zandvoort and took another podium at Algarve to seal the Silver class title.

== Karting record ==
=== Karting career summary ===
Season	Series	Team	Position
2019	Kartmasters British GP – IAME Cadet		
2021	Rotax Max Euro Golden Trophy – Junior Max	Charlie Hart	16th
2022	Rotax British 'O' Plate – Junior		5th
2022	British Kart Championship – Junior Max		6th
2022	RMC Grand Finals – Junior Max		20th

== Racing record ==
=== Racing career summary ===
Season	Series	Team	Races	Wins	Poles	F/Laps	Podiums	Points	Position
2022	Ginetta Junior Winter Series	Elite Motorsport	4	0	0	0	0	39	12th
2023	Ginetta Junior Championship	Elite Motorsport	27	0	1	0	4	474	7th
2024	Ginetta Junior Championship	Elite Motorsport	25	2	1	1	12	557	**3rd**
2025	GT4 Winter Series – Pro	RAFA Racing by Race Lab	14	2	3	1	9	188	**3rd**
2025	GT4 European Series – Silver	RAFA Racing by Race Lab	12	0	0	0	1	47	10th
2026	GT4 Winter Series – Pro	Elite Motorsport with Entire Race Engineering	3	2	1	1	2	40	9th
2026	GT4 European Series – Silver	Elite Motorsport with Entire Race Engineering	12	3	1	0	6	145	**1st**

* Season still in progress.

^{†} As Hart was a guest driver, he was ineligible for points.

=== Complete Ginetta Junior Championship results ===
(key) (Races in bold indicate pole position) (Races in italics indicate fastest lap)

Year	Team	1	2	3	4	5	6	7	8	9	10	11	12	13	14	15	16	17	18	19	20	21	22	23	24	25	26	27	DC	Points
2023	Elite Motorsport	OUL; 1; 2	OUL; 2; 5	OUL; 3 Ret	SIL1; 1; 3	SIL1; 2; 6	SIL1; 3; 9	DON1; 1; 9	DON1; 2; 3	DON1; 3; 4	**SIL2**; **1** Ret	SIL2; 2; 6	SIL2; 3; 6	SIL2; 4; 6	SIL2; 5; 5	SIL2; 6; 4	SNE; 1; 6	SNE; 2; 5	SNE; 3; 4	CAD; 1; 5	CAD; 2; 4	CAD; 3; 3	BRH; 1; 11	BRH; 2; 4	BRH; 3; 5	DON2; 1; 6	DON2; 2; 9	DON2; 3; 6	7th	474
2024	Elite Motorsport	OUL; 1; 2	OUL; 2; 2	OUL; 3; 2	SIL1; 1; 2	**SIL1**; **2**; 2	SIL1; 3; 6	DON1; 1; 3	DON1; 2; 4	DON1; 3; 6	ANG; 1; 3	ANG; 2; 6	ANG; 3; 4	ANG; 4; 6	SNE; 1; 3	SNE; 2; 6	SNE; 3; 5	SIL2; 1; 2	SIL2; 2; 5	SIL2; 3; 1	DON2; 1; 6	DON2; 2; 8	DON2; 3; 13	BRH; 1; 18	BRH; 2; 1	BRH; 3; 2			3rd	557

=== Complete GT4 European Series results ===
(key) (Races in bold indicate pole position) (Races in italics indicate fastest lap)

Year	Team	Car	Class	1	2	3	4	5	6	7	8	9	10	11	12	Pos	Points
2025	RAFA Racing by Race Lab	McLaren Artura GT4	Silver	LEC; 1 Ret	LEC; 2; 20	ZAN; 1; 11	ZAN; 2; 9	SPA; 1; 5	SPA; 2; 5	MIS; 1; 14	MIS; 2; 18	NÜR; 1 Ret	NÜR; 2; 5	CAT; 1; 3	CAT; 2 Ret	10th	47
2026	Elite Motorsport with Entire Race Engineering	McLaren Artura GT4	Silver	LEC; 1; 23	LEC; 2; 8	MNZ; 1; 20	MNZ; 2; 6	**SPA**; **1**; 2	**SPA**; **2**; 2	MIS; 1; 1	MIS; 2 Ret	ZAN; 1; 1	**ZAN**; **2**; 1	ALG; 1 Ret	**ALG**; **2**; 2	1st	145
