= Ethan Jeff-Hall =

British racing driver (born 2008)

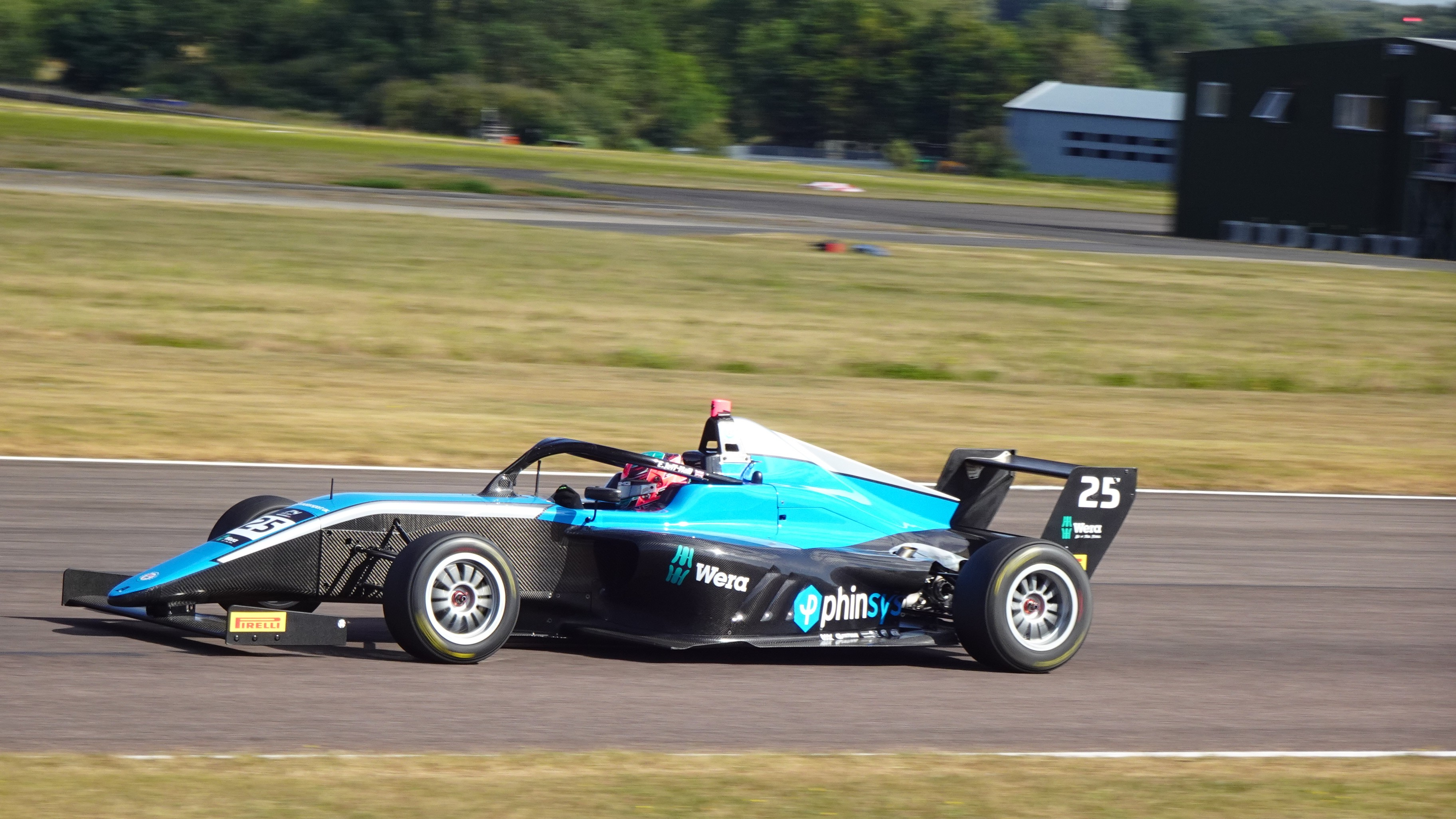
- Jeff-Hall in 2026
- Born: Ethan Matthew Jeff-Hall; 25 August 2008 (age 18); Lancaster, Lancashire, England
- Nationality: (United Kingdom) British

F4 British Championship career
- Debut season: 2025
- Current team: Argenti Motorsport
- Car number: 25
- Starts: 42
- Wins: 2
- Podiums: 9
- Poles: 0
- Fastest laps: 1
- Best finish: 5th in 2025

Previous series
- 2024: Ginetta Junior

Championship titles
- 2024: Ginetta Junior
- Statistics up to date as of 22 June 2026.

Ethan Matthew Jeff-Hall (born 25 August 2008) is a British racing driver who competes in the F4 British Championship with Argenti Motorsport as part of the Mercedes Junior Team.

In 2024, Jeff-Hall won the Karting World Championship in the OK class, and became the Ginetta Junior champion. Jeff-Hall is a member of the Mercedes Junior Team and a BRDC rising star.

== Career ==
=== Karting ===
Jeff-Hall began karting at the age of 6. His first major title win was the 2021 Mini Max British Championship. He had a successful follow-up year in 2022, when he became the Rotax Junior Max World Vice-Champion, British Open O-Plate Champion and the 2022 Rotax Max Euro Trophy Winner.

His senior karting honours included 2023 & 2024 Back-to-Back RMCIT Senior MAX Champion. Progressing to the senior OK class in 2024, he won the Karting World Championship after a final-lap overtake, aged 16. Later in 2024, Jeff-Hall partook in the Ferrari World Scouting Finals in Maranello.

=== Ginetta Junior Championship ===
Jeff-Hall made his car racing debut during the 2024 Ginetta Junior Championship, winning the championship in his rookie season.

=== British F4 ===
==== 2025 ====
For his 2025 campaign, Jeff-Hall drove for Argenti Motorsport in the 2025 F4 British Championship. He finished third during race one at the Snetterton Circuit round after battling with Rowan Campbell-Pilling for a majority of the race. Jeff-Hall finished in second during race one at the non-championship Silverstone Circuit round, which was held in support of the 2025 British Grand Prix. After qualifying in second, Jeff-Hall lost a position at the beginning of the race due to a poor start, but regained it later on. He claimed another podium at Zandvoort, finishing in third during race three. After a battle with August Raber and Arjen Kraling, Jeff-Hall finished third during the Donington Park (GP layout) round. Jeff-Hall's maiden win in the series came during race two of Silverstone's national layout round after overtaking Raber and Adam Al Azhari. For the final round at Brands Hatch, he claimed two podiums during races one and three. Jeff-Hall finished the season in fifth for the drivers' championship.

==== 2026 ====
Jeff-Hall continued with Argenti for the 2026 season.

=== Formula One ===
In February 2025, it was announced that Jeff-Hall had joined the Mercedes Junior Team.

== Karting record ==
=== Karting career summary ===
Season	Series	Team	Position
2019	LGM Series — IAME Cadet		5th
2019	British Karting Championship — IAME Cadet	Strawberry Racing	5th
2020	Kartmasters British Grand Prix — IAME Cadet	Strawberry Racing	4th
2020	British Karting Championship — IAME Cadet	Strawberry Racing	4th
2020	IAME International Final — X30 Mini	Strawberry Racing	4th
2020	Rotax Max Challenge International Trophy — Mini	Strawberry Racing	22nd
2021	British Karting Championship — Rotax Mini Max	Strawberry Racing	1st
2021	BNL Karting Series — Rotax Junior	Strawberry Racing	20th
2021	Rotax Max Euro Trophy — Junior	Strawberry Racing	5th
2021	Rotax Max Challenge Grand Finals — Junior	Strawberry Racing	39th
2022	British Karting Championship — Rotax Junior	Strawberry Racing	5th
2022	O Plate — Rotax Junior	Strawberry Racing	1st
2022	Rotax Max Euro Trophy — Junior	Strawberry Racing	1st
2022	IAME Warriors Final — X30 Junior	Strawberry Racing	20th
2022	Rotax Max Challenge Grand Finals — Junior	Strawberry Racing	2nd
2023	Rotax Euro Winter Cup — Senior	Strawberry Racing	3rd
2023	Kartmasters British Grand Prix — Rotax Junior	Strawberry Racing	3rd
2023	British Karting Championship — Rotax Junior	Strawberry Racing	2nd
2023	O Plate — Rotax Junior	Strawberry Racing	7th
2023	BNL Karting Series — Rotax Junior	Strawberry Racing	7th
2023	Rotax Max Euro Trophy — Senior	Strawberry Racing	10th
2023	Rotax Max Challenge International Trophy — Senior	Strawberry Racing	1st
2023	Rotax Max Challenge Grand Finals — Senior	Strawberry Racing	11th
2024	CIK-FIA European Championship — OK	CRG	NC†
2024	CIK-FIA World Championship — OK	CRG	1st
2024	Rotax Max Challenge International Trophy — Senior	Sam Pollitt Racing	1st

^{†} As Jeff-Hall was a guest driver, he was ineligible for championship points.

== Racing record ==
=== Racing career summary ===
Season	Series	Team	Races	Wins	Poles	F/Laps	Podiums	Points	Position
2024	Ginetta Junior Championship	R Racing	24	6	7	9	14	607	**1st**
2025	F4 British Championship	Phinsys by Argenti	30	1	0	0	6	206	5th
2026	F4 British Championship	Argenti Motorsport	24	1	0	1	6	181.5	5th

* Season still in progress.

=== Complete Ginetta Junior Championship results ===
(key) (Races in bold indicate pole position) (Races in italics indicate fastest lap)

Year	Team	1	2	3	4	5	6	7	8	9	10	11	12	13	14	15	16	17	18	19	20	21	22	23	24	25	DC	Points
2024	R Racing	**OUL**; **1**; 1	**OUL**; **2**; 7	OUL; 3; 5	SIL1; 1; 6	SIL1; 2; 5	SIL1; 3; 1	DON1; 1; 4	DON1; 2; 5	DON1; 3; 8	**ANG**; **1**; 1	**ANG**; **2**; 2	**ANG**; **3**; 1	**ANG**; **4**; 1	SNE; 1; 2	SNE; 2; 2	SNE; 3; 2	SIL2; 1; 1	**SIL2**; **2**; 2	SIL2; 3; 4	DON2; 1; 3	DON2; 2; 3	DON2; 3; 2	BRH; 1; 4	BRH; 2; 9	BRH; 3 DNS	1st	607

=== Complete F4 British Championship results ===
(key) (Races in bold indicate pole position) (Races in italics indicate fastest lap)

Year	Team	1	2	3	4	5	6	7	8	9	10	11	12	13	14	15	16	17	18	19	20	21	22	23	24	25	26	27	28	29	30	31	32	DC	Points
2025	Phinsys by Argenti	DPN; 1; 4	DPN; 2; 18	DPN; 3; 10	SILGP; 1; 7	SILGP; 2; 7^{4}	SILGP; 3; 4	SNE; 1; 3	SNE; 2; 7	SNE; 3; 13	THR; 1 Ret	THR; 2; 10	THR; 3; 9	OUL; 1; 7	OUL; 2; 4	OUL; 3; 17	SILGP; 1; 2	SILGP; 2; 7	ZAN; 1; 5	ZAN; 2; 6	ZAN; 3; 3	KNO; 1; 4	KNO; 2; 13	KNO; 3 Ret	DPGP; 1; 8	DPGP; 2; 3	DPGP; 3; 4	SILN; 1; 5	SILN; 2; 1^{3}	SILN; 3; 8	BHGP; 1; 3	BHGP; 2; 5^{4}	BHGP; 3; 3	5th	206
2026	Argenti Motorsport	DPN; 1; 2	DPN; 2; 9	DPN; 3; 2	BHI; 1; 1	BHI; 2; 10	BHI; 3; 13	SNE; 1; 8	SNE; 2; 5^{1}	SNE; 3; 8	SILGP; 1; 6	SILGP; 2; 12	SILGP; 3; 4	ZAN; 1; 4	ZAN; 2; 12	ZAN; 3; 9	THR; 1; 10	THR; 2; 3^{6}	THR; 3; 4	DPGP; 1; 3	DPGP; 2; 10	DPGP; 3 Ret	CRO; 1; 2	CRO; 2; 4^{2}	CRO; 3; 6	SILN; 1	SILN; 2	SILN; 3	BHGP; 1	BHGP; 2	BHGP; 3			5th	181.5

* Season still in progress.
