= Marcus Sæter =

Norwegian racing driver (born 2008)

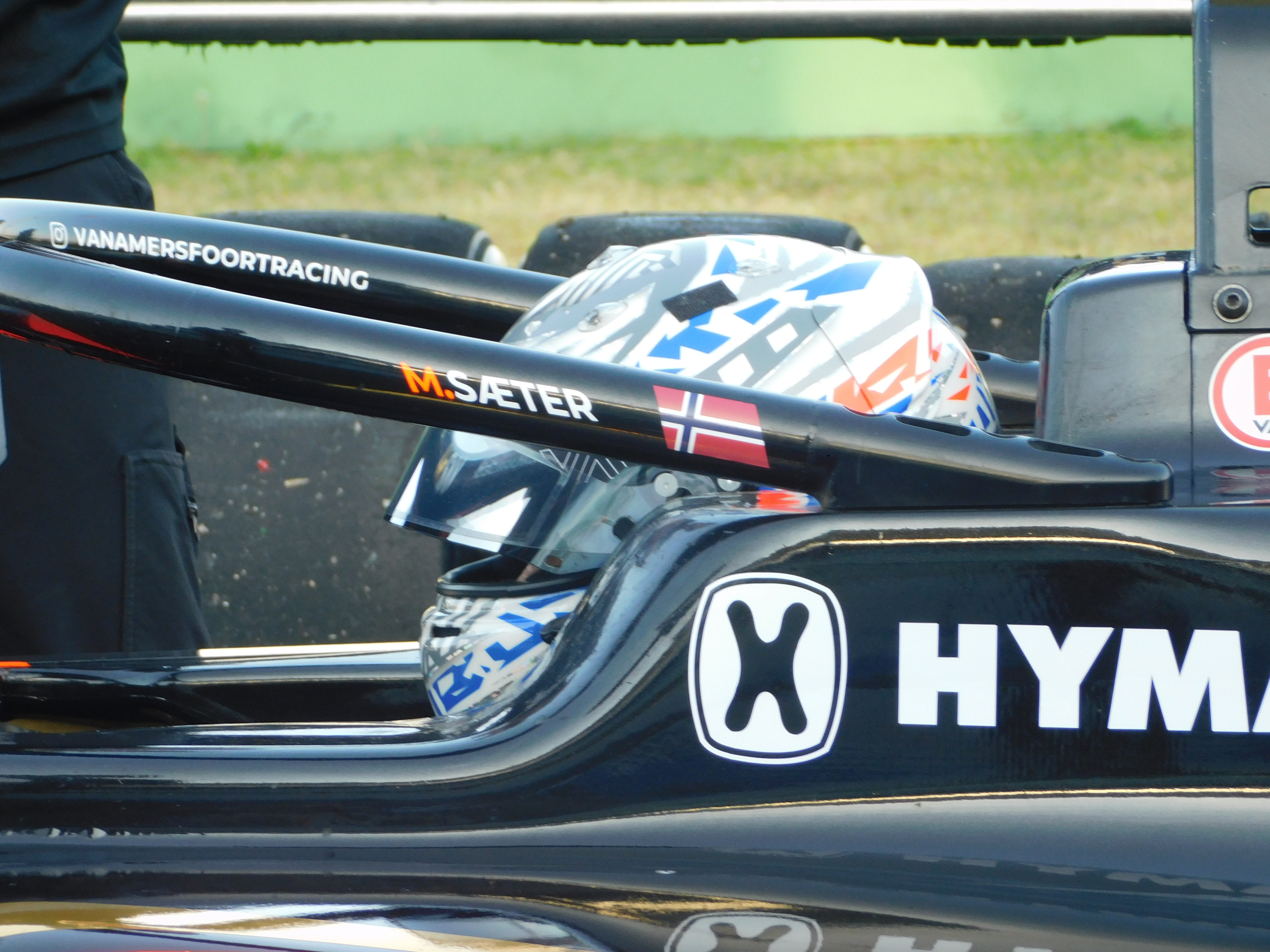
- Sæter in 2025
- Born: Marcus Ahlmann Sæter; 21 October 2008 (age 18); Norway
- Nationality: (Norway) Norwegian

Formula Regional European Championship career
- Debut season: 2026
- Current team: G4 Racing
- Car number: 67
- Starts: 19
- Wins: 0
- Podiums: 0
- Poles: 0
- Fastest laps: 0
- Best finish: 18th in 2026

Previous series
- 2025 2025 2024: Italian F4; Formula Winter Series; Ginetta Junior
- Statistics up to date as of 14 September 2026.

Marcus Ahlmann Sæter (born 21 October 2008) is a Norwegian racing driver who last competed in the Formula Regional European Championship for G4 Racing.

He has previously raced in the Italian F4 Championship for Van Amersfoort Racing.

== Career ==
=== Karting (2018–2023) ===
Sæter began karting in 2018. During his time in karts, Sæter most notably finished second in the 2021 South Garda Winter Cup in OK-J and in the 2022 Trofeo Delle Industrie in X30 Junior, before joining Team Norway in 2023.

=== Ginetta Junior and Formula 4 (2024–2025) ===
Stepping up to cars in 2024, Sæter joined R Racing to compete in the Ginetta Junior Championship. In the second round of the season at Silverstone, Sæter took his maiden series win in race two before closing out the weekend by finishing second in race three. Over the rest of the season, Sæter took his second win of the season at Anglesey, which helped him finish sixth in points after taking five more podiums.

The following year, Sæter transitioned to single-seaters by joining AKM Motorsport to race in the Aragón round of the Formula Winter Series. After taking a best result of 17th in race two, Sæter joined Van Amersfoort Racing for his maiden season in Italian F4. In the season-opening round at Misano, Sæter finished 13th in race two, also taking his maiden rookie podium of the season by finishing third in class. The following round at Vallelunga was a step forward for Sæter, as he took a rookie win by finishing fourth overall in race three, and taking two rookie podiums whilst finishing seventh and fifth in the other two races. At Monza, Sæter finished seventh in race two, which gave him his second rookie win of the year, enabling him to enter the final four rounds of the season second in the rookie standings. However, Sæter wasn't able to score points in the following two rounds at Mugello and Imola, as he finished no higher than twelfth across both rounds, before scoring a tenth-place finish in race three at Misano to end the year 15th in points.

=== Formula Regional (2026–present) ===
In 2026, Sæter joined G4 Racing to step up to the Formula Regional European Championship. After a quiet start fo the season, Sæter posted five points finishes in the second half of the season to take 18th in the overall standings with a best result of sixth at Monza.

== Karting record ==
=== Karting career summary ===
Season	Series	Team	Position
2018	South Garda Winter Cup — Mini Rok	Revolution Motorsport	NC
2018	WSK Final Cup — 60 Mini	Revolution Motorsport	108th
2019	WSK Champions Cup — 60 Mini	Revolution Motorsport	19th
2019	WSK Super Master Series — 60 Mini	Revolution Motorsport	34th
2019	South Garda Winter Cup — Mini Rok	Revolution Motorsport	29th
2019	Andrea Margutti Trophy — 60 Mini	Revolution Motorsport	7th
2019	WSK Euro Series — 60 Mini	Revolution Motorsport	30th
2019	WSK Open Cup — 60 Mini	Revolution Motorsport	11th
2019	WSK Final Cup — 60 Mini	Revolution Motorsport	NC
2019	Rok Cup Superfinal — Mini Rok	Revolution Motorsport	23rd
2019	Italian Karting Championship — Mini		7th
2020	WSK Champions Cup — 60 Mini	Revolution Motorsport	10th
2020	WSK Super Master Series — 60 Mini	Revolution Motorsport	16th
2020	South Garda Winter Cup — Mini Rok	Revolution Motorsport	5th
2020	WSK Euro Series — 60 Mini	Revolution Motorsport	8th
2020	Rok Cup International Final — Mini Rok	Revolution Motorsport	NC
2020	WSK Open Cup — 60 Mini	Revolution Motorsport	18th
2021	WSK Champions Cup — OK-J	Leclerc by Lennox Racing	NC
2021	WSK Super Master Series — OK-J	Leclerc by Lennox Racing	55th
2021	WSK Euro Series — OK-J	Leclerc by Lennox Racing	52nd
2021	Karting European Championship — OK-J	Leclerc by Lennox Racing	59th
2021	Champions of the Future — OK-J	Leclerc by Lennox Racing; Ward Racing (Note: Sæter competed for Leclerc by Lennox Racing in Rounds 1-2 and for Ward Racing in round 3.)	62nd
2021	Swedish Karting Championship — Junior	Ward Racing	4th
2021	WSK Final Cup — OK-J	Ward Racing	10th
2021	Karting World Championship — OK-J	Ward Racing	6th
2021	South Garda Winter Cup — OK-J	Ward Racing	2nd
2021	WSK Open Cup — OK-J	Ward Racing	41st
2022	WSK Super Master Series — OK-J	Ward Racing	10th
2022	Champions of the Future — OK-J	Ward Racing	37th
2022	Karting European Championship — OK-J	Ward Racing	14th
2022	WSK Euro Series — OK-J	Ward Racing	24th
2022	Karting World Championship — OK-J	Ward Racing	25th
2022	WSK Open Cup — OK	Ward Racing	28th
2022	Trofeo delle Industrie — X30 Senior	Ward Racing	2nd
2022	WSK Final Cup — OK	Ward Racing	24th
2023	South Garda Winter Cup — OK	Ward Racing	8th
2023	WSK Champions Cup — OK	Ward Racing	7th
2023	WSK Super Master Series — OK	Ward Racing	21st
2023	Champions of the Future — OK	Ward Racing; DPK Racing (Note: Sæter competed for Ward Racing in Rounds 1-4 and for DPK Racing in round 5.)	48th
2023	Karting European Championship — OK	Ward Racing; DPK Racing (Note: Sæter competed for Ward Racing in Rounds 1-2 and for DPK Racing in round 4.)	48th
2023	WSK Euro Series — OK	DPK Racing	64th
2023	Karting World Championship — OK	DPK Racing	11th
2023	WSK Final Cup — OK	DPK Racing	36th

== Racing record ==
=== Racing career summary ===
Season	Series	Team	Races	Wins	Poles	F/Laps	Podiums	Points	Position
2024	Ginetta Junior Championship	R Racing	25	2	0	1	8	490	6th
2025	Formula Winter Series	AKM Motorsport	3	0	0	0	0	0	35th
2025	Italian F4 Championship	Van Amersfoort Racing	20	0	0	0	0	35	15th
2026	Formula Regional European Championship	G4 Racing	19	0	0	0	0	29	18th

* Season still in progress.

=== Complete Ginetta Junior Championship results ===
(key) (Races in bold indicate pole position) (Races in italics indicate fastest lap)

Year	Team	1	2	3	4	5	6	7	8	9	10	11	12	13	14	15	16	17	18	19	20	21	22	23	24	25	DC	Points
2024	R Racing	OUL; 1; 4	OUL; 2; 22	OUL; 3; 13	SIL1; 1; 13	SIL1; 2; 1	SIL1; 3; 2	DON1; 1; 5	DON1; 2; 3	DON1; 3; 4	ANG; 1; 2	ANG; 2; 1	ANG; 3; 2	ANG; 4; 15	SNE; 1; 6	SNE; 2; 5	SNE; 3; 3	SIL2; 1; 4	SIL2; 2; 4	SIL2; 3; 8	DON2; 1; 2	DON2; 2; 7	DON2; 3; 12	BRH; 1; 5	BRH; 2; 5	BRH; 3; 4	6th	490

=== Complete Formula Winter Series results ===
(key) (Races in bold indicate pole position) (Races in italics indicate fastest lap)

Year	Team	1	2	3	4	5	6	7	8	9	10	11	12	DC	Points
2025	AKM Motorsport	POR; 1	POR; 2	POR; 3	CRT; 1	CRT; 2	CRT; 3	ARA; 1; 18	ARA; 2; 17	ARA; 3; 19	CAT; 1	CAT; 2	CAT; 3	35th	0

=== Complete Italian F4 Championship results ===
(key) (Races in bold indicate pole position; races in italics indicate fastest lap)

Year	Team	1	2	3	4	5	6	7	8	9	10	11	12	13	14	15	16	17	18	19	20	21	22	23	24	25	DC	Points
2025	Van Amersfoort Racing	MIS1; 1	MIS1; 2; 13	MIS1; 3; 15	MIS1; 4; 18	VLL; 1; 7	VLL; 2	VLL; 3; 4	VLL; 4; 5	MNZ; 1; 13	MNZ; 2; 7	MNZ; 3; 21	MUG; 1; 23	MUG; 2; 24	MUG; 3; 12	IMO; 1; 25	IMO; 2 C	IMO; 3; 14	CAT; 1; 18	CAT; 2 Ret	CAT; 3 C	MIS2; 1; 28	MIS2; 2	MIS2; 3; 10	MIS2; 4; 22	MIS2; 5; 23	15th	35

=== Complete Formula Regional European Championship results ===
(key) (Races in bold indicate pole position) (Races in italics indicate fastest lap)

Year	Team	1	2	3	4	5	6	7	8	9	10	11	12	13	14	15	16	17	18	19	20	DC	Points
2026	G4 Racing	RBR; 1; 15	RBR; 2 Ret	RBR; 3; 14	ZAN; 1; 22	ZAN; 2; 22	SPA; 1; 12	SPA; 2 C	SPA; 3; 7	MNZ; 1; 13	MNZ; 2; 6	MNZ; 3 Ret	HUN; 1; 7	HUN; 2; 7	LEC; 1; 8	LEC; 2; 15	IMO; 1; 24†	IMO; 2; 23	IMO; 3; 11	HOC; 1; 17	HOC; 2; 9	18th	29
