= Ducati Sporting Club DesmoDue Championship =

United Kingdom motorcycle racing series

The 'DesmoDue Championship' is a one-make motorcycle racing series in the United Kingdom. The series was started by the Ducati Sporting Club in 2005 and is administered by them. The series has been hosted by various clubs and is currently run at NG Road Racing meetings.

The motorcycles must be based on an air-cooled 2-valve Ducati twin-cylinder engine produced since 1992. The machines are allowed limited modifications in order to maintain parity. The series also uses a spec / control which is currently the Dunlop Sportsmart TT (Dunlop Wets are also allowed).

There are two engine capacity classes;

1. Class A - 618cc fuel injection based machines
2. Class B - 583cc carburettor based machines

Riders must hold an ACU racing licence.

== Lap records ==
Anglesey (Coastal)
| Class A | Chris Norris | 1:17.157 | 2022 |
| Class B | Jim Brian | 1:19.800 | 2013 |

Assen
| Class A | Dominic Cann | 2:01.965 | 2007 |
| Class B | Dominic Clegg | 2:09.777 | 2007 |

Brands Hatch (Indy)
| Class A | Darryl Silk | 0:54.330 | 2026 |
| Class B | Chris Clarke | 0:55.999 | 2012 |

Cadwell Park (Full)
| Class A | Dominic Cann | 1:43.999 | 2022 |
| Class B | Chris Clarke | 1:47.068 | 2012 |

Cadwell Park (Woodlands)
| Class A | Geoff Spencer | 0:47.810 | 2005 |
| Class B | Andy Johnson | 0.50.200 | 2005 |

Castle Combe
| Class A | Dominic Cann | 1:19.400 | 2022 |
| Class B | Brian Tipple | 1:25.055 | 2022 |

Donington Park (GP)
| Class A | Tim Pritchard | 1:54.100 | 2009 |
| Class B | Sam West | 1:58.770 | 2009 |

Donington Park (National)
| Class A | Dominic Cann | 1:19.909 | 2023 |
| Class B | Floyd Moody | 1:24.670 | 2023 |

Mallory Park
| Class A | Neil Appleby | 59.369 | 2011 |
| Class B | Sam West | 1:02.670 | 2009 |

Oulton Park
| Class A | Chris Norris | 1:56.070 | 2022 |
| Class B | Jack Younge | 2:01.612 | 2017 |

Pembrey
| Class A | Scott Wilson | 1:05.309 | 2022 |
| Class B | Hugh Simpson | 1:08.910 | 2011 |

Silverstone (National)
| Class A | Tom Parkes | 1:08.940 | 2010 |
| Class B | Matt Lawson | 1:12.270 | 2010 |

Snetterton 200
| Class A | Philip Murden | 1:27.195 | 2018 |
| Class B | Austin Lachlan | 1:34.274 | 2019 |

Snetterton 300
| Class A | Andy Challis | 2:13.621 | 2012 |
| Class B | Chris Clarke | 2:18.337 | 2012 |

Thruxton
| Class A | Andy Blomfield | 1:32.761 | 2017 |
| Class B | Jack Younge | 1:39.630 | 2016 |

== Champions - Class A ==
| 2025 | Dominic Cann | 620cc |
| 2024 | Dominic Cann | 620cc |
| 2023 | Dominic Cann | 620cc |
| 2022 | Dominic Cann | 620cc |
| 2021 | Chris Norris | 620cc |
| 2020 | Dan James | 620cc |
| 2019 | Duncan Baillie | 620cc |
| 2018 | Andy Blomfield | 620cc |
| 2017 | Andy Blomfield | 620cc |
| 2016 | Andy Blomfield | 620cc |
| 2015 | Dallas Hornblow | 620cc |
| 2014 | Matt Lawson | 620cc |
| 2013 | Dave Wood Jr | 620cc |
| 2012 | Andy Challis | 620cc |
| 2011 | Neil Appleby | 620cc |
| 2010 | Mark Lister | 620cc |
| 2009 | Andy Sheppard | 620cc |
| 2008 | Ian Cobby | 620cc |
| 2007 | Kyle Hinton | 620cc |
| 2006 | Dominic Cann | 620cc |
| 2005 | Geoff Spencer | 620cc |

== Champions - Class B ==
| 2025 | Andy Hind | 583cc |
| 2024 | Sean Coyle | 583cc |
| 2023 | Floyd Moody | 583cc |
| 2022 | Floyd Moody | 583cc |
| 2021 | Brian Tipple | 583cc |
| 2020 | Brian Tipple | 583cc |
| 2019 | Martin Tomkins | 583cc |
| 2018 | Rodney King | 583cc |
| 2017 | Jack Younge | 583cc |
| 2016 | Pete Pritchard | 583cc |
| 2015 | Scott Wilson | 583cc |
| 2014 | Andy Blomfield | 583cc |
| 2013 | Tom Halifax | 583cc |
| 2012 | Chris Clarke | 583cc |
| 2011 | Phil Wilcock | 583cc |
| 2010 | Matt Larrett | 583cc |
| 2009 | Sam West | 583cc |
| 2008 | Matt Traynar | 583cc |
| 2007 | Andy Sheppard | 583cc |
| 2006 | Phil Huntley | 583cc |
