= 2026 GT4 European Series =

Nineteenth season of the GT4 European Series

The 2026 GT4 European Series was the 19th season of the GT4 European Series organised by the SRO Motorsports Group. The races were contested with GT4-spec cars. The season started on 10 April at Circuit Paul Ricard and finished on 18 October at the Algarve International Circuit.

== Calendar ==
The calendar for the 2026 season was unveiled on 27 June 2025 during the 2025 24 Hours of Spa. All six race weekends supported the 2026 GT World Challenge Europe.

Round	Circuit	Date	Supporting	Map
1	Circuit Paul Ricard, Le Castellet, France	10–12 April	GT World Challenge Europe Endurance Cup	2026 GT4 European Series is located in Europe
2	Monza Circuit, Monza, Italy	29–31 May	GT World Challenge Europe Endurance Cup	2026 GT4 European Series is located in Europe
3	Circuit de Spa-Francorchamps, Stavelot, Belgium	23–27 June	Intercontinental GT Challenge; GT World Challenge Europe Endurance Cup	2026 GT4 European Series is located in Europe
4	Misano World Circuit, Misano, Italy	16–19 July	GT World Challenge Europe Sprint Cup	2026 GT4 European Series is located in Europe
5	Circuit Zandvoort, Zandvoort, Netherlands	18–20 September	GT World Challenge Europe Sprint Cup	2026 GT4 European Series is located in Europe
6	Algarve International Circuit, Portimão, Portugal	16–18 October	GT World Challenge Europe Endurance Cup	2026 GT4 European Series is located in Europe

== Entries ==
Team	Car	Engine	No.	Drivers	Class	Rounds
(France) Team Speedcar	Audi R8 LMS GT4 Evo	Audi DAR 5.2 L V10	1	(France) Robert Consani	S	All
(France) Team Speedcar	Audi R8 LMS GT4 Evo	Audi DAR 5.2 L V10	1	(France) Benjamin Lariche	S	All
(France) Team Speedcar	Audi R8 LMS GT4 Evo	Audi DAR 5.2 L V10	3	(France) Viny Beltramelli	PA	All
(France) Team Speedcar	Audi R8 LMS GT4 Evo	Audi DAR 5.2 L V10	3	(France) Sacha Bottemanne	PA	All
(France) Team Speedcar	Audi R8 LMS GT4 Evo	Audi DAR 5.2 L V10	8	(France) Grégory Guilvert	S	All
(France) Team Speedcar	Audi R8 LMS GT4 Evo	Audi DAR 5.2 L V10	8	(France) Paul Petit	S	All
(France) Team Speedcar	Audi R8 LMS GT4 Evo	Audi DAR 5.2 L V10	44	(France) Julien Ripert	Am	1–3
(Netherlands) JW Raceservice	Porsche 718 Cayman GT4 RS Clubsport	Porsche MDG.GA 4.0 L Flat-6	2	(Netherlands) Leon van Verseveld	S	1–5
(Netherlands) JW Raceservice	Porsche 718 Cayman GT4 RS Clubsport	Porsche MDG.GA 4.0 L Flat-6	2	(Netherlands) Bas Visser	S	1–5
(Portugal) Speedy Motorsport	Toyota GR Supra GT4 Evo2	Toyota B58H 3.0 L Turbo I6	4	(Australia) Lachlan Evennett	S	All
(Portugal) Speedy Motorsport	Toyota GR Supra GT4 Evo2	Toyota B58H 3.0 L Turbo I6	4	(Netherlands) Mees Houben	S	All
(Portugal) Speedy Motorsport	Toyota GR Supra GT4 Evo2	Toyota B58H 3.0 L Turbo I6	6	(Portugal) Tomás Guedes	S	All
(Portugal) Speedy Motorsport	Toyota GR Supra GT4 Evo2	Toyota B58H 3.0 L Turbo I6	6	(Portugal) Pedro Perino	S	All
(Spain) Mirage Racing	Toyota GR Supra GT4 Evo2	Toyota B58H 3.0 L Turbo I6	5	(Netherlands) Ruben del Sarte	S	All
(Spain) Mirage Racing	Toyota GR Supra GT4 Evo2	Toyota B58H 3.0 L Turbo I6	5	(United Kingdom) James Sherrington	S	All
(Spain) Mirage Racing	Toyota GR Supra GT4 Evo2	Toyota B58H 3.0 L Turbo I6	9	(France) Roméo Leurs	S	All
(Spain) Mirage Racing	Toyota GR Supra GT4 Evo2	Toyota B58H 3.0 L Turbo I6	9	(France) Hugo Conde	S	1
(Spain) Mirage Racing	Toyota GR Supra GT4 Evo2	Toyota B58H 3.0 L Turbo I6	9	(Denmark) Victor Nielsen	S	2
(Spain) Mirage Racing	Toyota GR Supra GT4 Evo2	Toyota B58H 3.0 L Turbo I6	9	(Brazil) Roberto Faria	S	3–6
(Turkey) Borusan Otomotiv Motorsport	BMW M4 GT4 Evo (G82)	BMW S58B30T0 3.0 L Turbo I6	11	(Turkey) Bati Ege Yildirim	S	1–2, 4–6
(Turkey) Borusan Otomotiv Motorsport	BMW M4 GT4 Evo (G82)	BMW S58B30T0 3.0 L Turbo I6	11	(Turkey) Yağiz Gedik	S	1–2, 4–6
(Turkey) Borusan Otomotiv Motorsport	BMW M4 GT4 Evo (G82)	BMW S58B30T0 3.0 L Turbo I6	11	(Turkey) Bati Ege Yildirim	PA	3
(Turkey) Borusan Otomotiv Motorsport	BMW M4 GT4 Evo (G82)	BMW S58B30T0 3.0 L Turbo I6	11	(Turkey) Yağiz Gedik	PA	3
(Turkey) Borusan Otomotiv Motorsport	BMW M4 GT4 Evo (G82)	BMW S58B30T0 3.0 L Turbo I6	12	(Italy) Gabriele Piana	S	All
(Turkey) Borusan Otomotiv Motorsport	BMW M4 GT4 Evo (G82)	BMW S58B30T0 3.0 L Turbo I6	12	(Germany) Thomas Rackl	S	All
(Spain) NM Racing Team	Mercedes-AMG GT4	Mercedes-AMG M178 4.0 L Turbo V8	15	(Spain) Lluc Ibáñez	S	All
(Spain) NM Racing Team	Mercedes-AMG GT4	Mercedes-AMG M178 4.0 L Turbo V8	15	(United States) Alexandre Papadopulos	S	All
(Spain) NM Racing Team	Mercedes-AMG GT4	Mercedes-AMG M178 4.0 L Turbo V8	16	(Spain) Max Huber	PA	All
(Spain) NM Racing Team	Mercedes-AMG GT4	Mercedes-AMG M178 4.0 L Turbo V8	16	(Spain) Maximus Mayer	PA	All
(Spain) NM Racing Team	Mercedes-AMG GT4	Mercedes-AMG M178 4.0 L Turbo V8	17	(Australia) Diesel Thomas	S	3
(Spain) NM Racing Team	Mercedes-AMG GT4	Mercedes-AMG M178 4.0 L Turbo V8	17	(Australia) Joshua Thomas	S	3
Toyota Gazoo Racing Caetano Portugal	Toyota GR Supra GT4 Evo2	Toyota B58H 3.0 L Turbo I6	21	(Portugal) Francisco Mora	PA	6
Toyota Gazoo Racing Caetano Portugal	Toyota GR Supra GT4 Evo2	Toyota B58H 3.0 L Turbo I6	21	(Portugal) José Carlos Pires	PA	6
(United Kingdom) Grange Racing by FSR	Aston Martin Vantage AMR GT4 Evo	Aston Martin M177 4.0 L Turbo V8	23	(United Kingdom) Daniel Lavery	PA	3
(United Kingdom) Grange Racing by FSR	Aston Martin Vantage AMR GT4 Evo	Aston Martin M177 4.0 L Turbo V8	23	(United Kingdom) Darren Turner	PA	3
(France) JSB Compétition	Porsche 718 Cayman GT4 RS Clubsport	Porsche MDG.GA 4.0 L Flat-6	24	(France) Julien Briché	Am	1
(France) JSB Compétition	Porsche 718 Cayman GT4 RS Clubsport	Porsche MDG.GA 4.0 L Flat-6	24	(France) Nicco Ferrarin	Am	1
(France) JSB Compétition	Porsche 718 Cayman GT4 RS Clubsport	Porsche MDG.GA 4.0 L Flat-6	24	(France) Julien Briché	PA	2–6
(France) JSB Compétition	Porsche 718 Cayman GT4 RS Clubsport	Porsche MDG.GA 4.0 L Flat-6	24	(France) Nicco Ferrarin	PA	2–6
(Italy) Lotus PB Racing	Lotus Emira GT4	Toyota 2GR-FE 3.5 L V6	26	(Italy) Massimo Abbati	PA	1–4
(Italy) Lotus PB Racing	Lotus Emira GT4	Toyota 2GR-FE 3.5 L V6	26	(Italy) Stefano d'Aste	PA	1–4
(Italy) Lotus PB Racing	Lotus Emira GT4	Toyota 2GR-FE 3.5 L V6	56	(Italy) Maurizio Copetti	PA	1–4
(Italy) Lotus PB Racing	Lotus Emira GT4	Toyota 2GR-FE 3.5 L V6	56	(Italy) Massimiliano Schiavone	PA	1–4
(Sweden) Nova Racing	Porsche 718 Cayman GT4 RS Clubsport	Porsche MDG.GA 4.0 L Flat-6	27	(Sweden) Edvin Hellsten	PA	All
(Sweden) Nova Racing	Porsche 718 Cayman GT4 RS Clubsport	Porsche MDG.GA 4.0 L Flat-6	27	(Sweden) Daniel Nilsson	PA	All
(Germany) W&S Motorsport	Porsche 718 Cayman GT4 RS Clubsport	Porsche MDG.GA 4.0 L Flat-6	30	(Germany) Daniel Blickle	Am	All
(Germany) W&S Motorsport	Porsche 718 Cayman GT4 RS Clubsport	Porsche MDG.GA 4.0 L Flat-6	30	(Germany) Moritz Berrenberg	Am	1
(Germany) W&S Motorsport	Porsche 718 Cayman GT4 RS Clubsport	Porsche MDG.GA 4.0 L Flat-6	30	(Germany) Max Kronberg	Am	2–6
(Germany) W&S Motorsport	Porsche 718 Cayman GT4 RS Clubsport	Porsche MDG.GA 4.0 L Flat-6	31	(Israel) Alon Gabbay	PA	All
(Germany) W&S Motorsport	Porsche 718 Cayman GT4 RS Clubsport	Porsche MDG.GA 4.0 L Flat-6	31	(United States) Tim Horrell	PA	All
(Germany) W&S Motorsport	Porsche 718 Cayman GT4 RS Clubsport	Porsche MDG.GA 4.0 L Flat-6	32	(Germany) Joachim Bölting	PA	1–5
(Germany) W&S Motorsport	Porsche 718 Cayman GT4 RS Clubsport	Porsche MDG.GA 4.0 L Flat-6	32	(Germany) Hendrik Still	PA	1–5
(Germany) W&S Motorsport	Porsche 718 Cayman GT4 RS Clubsport	Porsche MDG.GA 4.0 L Flat-6	32	(Germany) Joachim Bölting	Am	6
(Portugal) Racar Motorsport	Aston Martin Vantage AMR GT4 Evo	Aston Martin M177 4.0 L Turbo V8	28	(France) Mathieu Martins	PA	6
(Portugal) Racar Motorsport	Aston Martin Vantage AMR GT4 Evo	Aston Martin M177 4.0 L Turbo V8	28	(Portugal) Vasco Oliveira	PA	6
Toyota Gazoo Racing Sweden	Toyota GR Supra GT4 Evo2	Toyota B58H 3.0 L Turbo I6	29	(Sweden) Maximilian Boström	S	All
Toyota Gazoo Racing Sweden	Toyota GR Supra GT4 Evo2	Toyota B58H 3.0 L Turbo I6	29	(United Kingdom) Henry Joslyn	S	1–4
Toyota Gazoo Racing Sweden	Toyota GR Supra GT4 Evo2	Toyota B58H 3.0 L Turbo I6	29	(Spain) Javier Sagrera	S	5
Toyota Gazoo Racing Sweden	Toyota GR Supra GT4 Evo2	Toyota B58H 3.0 L Turbo I6	29	(Italy) Simone Bianco	S	6
Toyota Gazoo Racing Sweden	Toyota GR Supra GT4 Evo2	Toyota B58H 3.0 L Turbo I6	55	(Sweden) Christoffer Brunnhagen	Am	All
Toyota Gazoo Racing Sweden	Toyota GR Supra GT4 Evo2	Toyota B58H 3.0 L Turbo I6	55	(Sweden) Mikael Brunnhagen	Am	All
(France) CMR	Ginetta G56 GT4 Evo	GM LS3 6.2 L V8	51	(France) Hugo Mogica	PA	1–3
(France) CMR	Ginetta G56 GT4 Evo	GM LS3 6.2 L V8	51	(France) Thibaut Mogica	PA	1–3
(France) CMR	Ginetta G56 GT4 Evo	GM LS3 6.2 L V8	65	(United Kingdom) Georgi Dimitrov	S	2
(France) CMR	Ginetta G56 GT4 Evo	GM LS3 6.2 L V8	65	(United Kingdom) Jack Mitchell	S	2
(San Marino) W&D Racing Team	BMW M4 GT4 Evo (G82)	BMW S58B30T0 3.0 L Turbo I6	53	(San Marino) Davide Meloni	PA	All
(San Marino) W&D Racing Team	BMW M4 GT4 Evo (G82)	BMW S58B30T0 3.0 L Turbo I6	53	(San Marino) Paolo Meloni	PA	All
(Austria) Razoon – more than racing	BMW M4 GT4 Evo (G82)	BMW S58B30T0 3.0 L Turbo I6	60	(Turkey) Önder Erdem	PA	1–5
(Austria) Razoon – more than racing	BMW M4 GT4 Evo (G82)	BMW S58B30T0 3.0 L Turbo I6	60	(Switzerland) Gustavo Xavier	PA	1–5
(Austria) Razoon – more than racing	BMW M4 GT4 Evo (G82)	BMW S58B30T0 3.0 L Turbo I6	70	(Austria) Daniel Drexel	PA	All
(Austria) Razoon – more than racing	BMW M4 GT4 Evo (G82)	BMW S58B30T0 3.0 L Turbo I6	70	(United Kingdom) Chris Salkeld	PA	All
(United Kingdom) Academy Motorsport	Ford Mustang GT4 (S650)	Ford Coyote 5.0 L V8	61	(United States) Erik Evans	S	All
(United Kingdom) Academy Motorsport	Ford Mustang GT4 (S650)	Ford Coyote 5.0 L V8	61	(Belgium) Nathan Vanspringel	S	1–5
(United Kingdom) Academy Motorsport	Ford Mustang GT4 (S650)	Ford Coyote 5.0 L V8	61	(Australia) Cameron McLeod	S	6
(United Kingdom) Academy Motorsport	Ford Mustang GT4 (S650)	Ford Coyote 5.0 L V8	62	(Canada) Marco Signoretti	S	1–2
(United Kingdom) Academy Motorsport	Ford Mustang GT4 (S650)	Ford Coyote 5.0 L V8	62	(United States) Jenson Altzman	S	1
(United Kingdom) Academy Motorsport	Ford Mustang GT4 (S650)	Ford Coyote 5.0 L V8	62	(Australia) Cameron McLeod	S	2
(United Kingdom) Academy Motorsport	Ford Mustang GT4 (S650)	Ford Coyote 5.0 L V8	62	(United Kingdom) William Lucas	S	5
(United Kingdom) Academy Motorsport	Ford Mustang GT4 (S650)	Ford Coyote 5.0 L V8	62	(Belgium) Michiel Haverans	S	5
(United Kingdom) Academy Motorsport	Ford Mustang GT4 (S650)	Ford Coyote 5.0 L V8	62	(United States) Michael Tosi	PA	6
(United Kingdom) Academy Motorsport	Ford Mustang GT4 (S650)	Ford Coyote 5.0 L V8	62	(Belgium) Nathan Vanspringel	PA	6
(Germany) ME Motorsport	BMW M4 GT4 Evo (G82)	BMW S58B30T0 3.0 L Turbo I6	66	(Germany) Philip Wiskirchen	S	3, 5
(Germany) ME Motorsport	BMW M4 GT4 Evo (G82)	BMW S58B30T0 3.0 L Turbo I6	66	(Germany) Linus Hahne	S	3
(Germany) ME Motorsport	BMW M4 GT4 Evo (G82)	BMW S58B30T0 3.0 L Turbo I6	66	(Austria) Lukas Stiefelhagen	S	5
(Belgium) TeamFloral	Ford Mustang GT4 (S650)	Ford Coyote 5.0 L V8	68	(United States) Sam Paley	S	All
(Belgium) TeamFloral	Ford Mustang GT4 (S650)	Ford Coyote 5.0 L V8	68	(Belgium) Michiel Haverans	S	1–4
(Belgium) TeamFloral	Ford Mustang GT4 (S650)	Ford Coyote 5.0 L V8	68	(Austria) Kiano Blum	S	5–6
(United Kingdom) Elite Motorsport with Entire Race Engineering	McLaren Artura GT4	McLaren M630 3.0 L Turbo V6	71	(United Kingdom) Ravi Ramyead	PA	All
(United Kingdom) Elite Motorsport with Entire Race Engineering	McLaren Artura GT4	McLaren M630 3.0 L Turbo V6	71	(United Kingdom) Charlie Robertson	PA	All
(United Kingdom) Elite Motorsport with Entire Race Engineering	McLaren Artura GT4	McLaren M630 3.0 L Turbo V6	77	(Belgium) Yani Stevenheydens	S	All
(United Kingdom) Elite Motorsport with Entire Race Engineering	McLaren Artura GT4	McLaren M630 3.0 L Turbo V6	77	(United Kingdom) Harri Reynolds	S	1–4
(United Kingdom) Elite Motorsport with Entire Race Engineering	McLaren Artura GT4	McLaren M630 3.0 L Turbo V6	77	(United Kingdom) Henry Joslyn	S	5–6
(United Kingdom) Elite Motorsport with Entire Race Engineering	McLaren Artura GT4	McLaren M630 3.0 L Turbo V6	78	(United Kingdom) McKenzy Cresswell	S	All
(United Kingdom) Elite Motorsport with Entire Race Engineering	McLaren Artura GT4	McLaren M630 3.0 L Turbo V6	78	(United Kingdom) Charlie Hart	S	All
(Switzerland) Racing Spirit of Léman	Aston Martin Vantage AMR GT4 Evo	Aston Martin M177 4.0 L Turbo V8	72	(France) Florent Grizaud	PA	1–5
(Switzerland) Racing Spirit of Léman	Aston Martin Vantage AMR GT4 Evo	Aston Martin M177 4.0 L Turbo V8	72	(France) Louka Desgranges	PA	1
(Switzerland) Racing Spirit of Léman	Aston Martin Vantage AMR GT4 Evo	Aston Martin M177 4.0 L Turbo V8	72	(Switzerland) David Kullmann	PA	2–5
(Switzerland) Racing Spirit of Léman	Aston Martin Vantage AMR GT4 Evo	Aston Martin M177 4.0 L Turbo V8	74	(Luxembourg) Clément Seyler	S	All
(Switzerland) Racing Spirit of Léman	Aston Martin Vantage AMR GT4 Evo	Aston Martin M177 4.0 L Turbo V8	74	(Brazil) Pedro Garcia	S	1–5
(Switzerland) Racing Spirit of Léman	Aston Martin Vantage AMR GT4 Evo	Aston Martin M177 4.0 L Turbo V8	74	(Switzerland) David Kullman	S	6
(United Kingdom) Race Lab	McLaren Artura GT4	McLaren M630 3.0 L Turbo V6	75	(Republic of Ireland) Colin Cronin	S	All
(United Kingdom) Race Lab	McLaren Artura GT4	McLaren M630 3.0 L Turbo V6	75	(Republic of Ireland) Robert Cronin	S	1–3
(United Kingdom) Race Lab	McLaren Artura GT4	McLaren M630 3.0 L Turbo V6	75	(Australia) Jayden Kelly	S	4
(United Kingdom) Race Lab	McLaren Artura GT4	McLaren M630 3.0 L Turbo V6	75	(United Kingdom) George King	S	5–6
(Germany) SRS Team Sorg Rennsport	Porsche 718 Cayman GT4 RS Clubsport	Porsche MDG.GA 4.0 L Flat-6	85	(Netherlands) Calvin De Groot	PA	2–3
(Germany) SRS Team Sorg Rennsport	Porsche 718 Cayman GT4 RS Clubsport	Porsche MDG.GA 4.0 L Flat-6	85	(United States) Ross Poole	PA	2–3
(Belgium) CRT-Sport	Toyota GR Supra GT4 Evo2	Toyota B58H 3.0 L Turbo I6	87	(Belgium) Lucas Cartelle	S	All
(Belgium) CRT-Sport	Toyota GR Supra GT4 Evo2	Toyota B58H 3.0 L Turbo I6	87	(United States) Hudson Schwartz	S	All
(Portugal) Gianfranco Motorsport	Toyota GR Supra GT4 Evo2	Toyota B58H 3.0 L Turbo I6	88	(Portugal) Nuno Afonso	PA	6
(Portugal) Gianfranco Motorsport	Toyota GR Supra GT4 Evo2	Toyota B58H 3.0 L Turbo I6	88	(Portugal) Alexandre Areia	PA	6
(France) Chazel Technologie Course	Alpine A110 GT4+	Alpine M5P400 1.8 L Turbo I4	93	(France) Laurent Hurgon	PA	3
(France) Chazel Technologie Course	Alpine A110 GT4+	Alpine M5P400 1.8 L Turbo I4	93	(France) Lazare Lartigau	PA	3
(Sweden) Lestrup Racing Team	BMW M4 GT4 Evo (G82)	BMW S58B30T0 3.0 L Turbo I6	97	(Sweden) Stefan Nilsson	PA	3
(Sweden) Lestrup Racing Team	BMW M4 GT4 Evo (G82)	BMW S58B30T0 3.0 L Turbo I6	97	(Sweden) Daniel Varverud	PA	3
(Germany) Schubert Motorsport	BMW M4 GT4 Evo (G82)	BMW S58B30T0 3.0 L Turbo I6	98	(Sweden) Victor Bouveng	PA	All
(Germany) Schubert Motorsport	BMW M4 GT4 Evo (G82)	BMW S58B30T0 3.0 L Turbo I6	98	(Sweden) Joakim Walde	PA	All
(Germany) SR Motorsport by Schnitzelalm	Mercedes-AMG GT4	Mercedes-AMG M178 4.0 L Turbo V8	110	(Switzerland) Julien Apotheloz	S	2–3
(Germany) SR Motorsport by Schnitzelalm	Mercedes-AMG GT4	Mercedes-AMG M178 4.0 L Turbo V8	110	(Germany) Marcel Marchewicz	S	2
(Germany) SR Motorsport by Schnitzelalm	Mercedes-AMG GT4	Mercedes-AMG M178 4.0 L Turbo V8	110	(Germany) Joel Mesch	S	3–4, 6
(Germany) SR Motorsport by Schnitzelalm	Mercedes-AMG GT4	Mercedes-AMG M178 4.0 L Turbo V8	110	(Macau) Weng Hin Liu	S	4
(Germany) SR Motorsport by Schnitzelalm	Mercedes-AMG GT4	Mercedes-AMG M178 4.0 L Turbo V8	110	(Germany) Jay Mo Härtling	S	6
(Germany) SR Motorsport by Schnitzelalm	Mercedes-AMG GT4	Mercedes-AMG M178 4.0 L Turbo V8	111	(Germany) Enrico Förderer	S	All
(Germany) SR Motorsport by Schnitzelalm	Mercedes-AMG GT4	Mercedes-AMG M178 4.0 L Turbo V8	111	(Germany) Cedric Fuchs	S	All
(Romania) Willi Motorsport	Audi R8 LMS GT4 Evo	Audi DAR 5.2 L V10	127	(Romania) Eric Bodgan Ciorioanu	PA	1–2
(Romania) Willi Motorsport	Audi R8 LMS GT4 Evo	Audi DAR 5.2 L V10	127	(Romania) Adrian Zelca	PA	1–2
(Romania) Willi Motorsport	Audi R8 LMS GT4 Evo	Audi DAR 5.2 L V10	310	(Romania) Tudor Tudurachi	S	1–5
(Romania) Willi Motorsport	Audi R8 LMS GT4 Evo	Audi DAR 5.2 L V10	310	(Romania) Sergiu Nicolae	S	1–4
(Romania) Willi Motorsport	Audi R8 LMS GT4 Evo	Audi DAR 5.2 L V10	310	(Ukraine) Ivan Klymenko	S	5
(Italy) Ebimotors	Porsche 718 Cayman GT4 RS Clubsport	Porsche MDG.GA 4.0 L Flat-6	151	(Italy) Paolo Gnemmi	PA	2
(Italy) Ebimotors	Porsche 718 Cayman GT4 RS Clubsport	Porsche MDG.GA 4.0 L Flat-6	151	(Italy) Riccardo Pera	PA	2

Icon	Class
S	Silver Cup
PA	Pro-Am Cup
Am	Am Cup

== Results and standings ==
=== Race results ===
Bold indicates overall winner.

Round		Circuit	Pole position	Silver Winners	Pro-Am Winners	Am Winners
1	R1	(France) Paul Ricard	(Spain) No. 15 NM Racing Team	**(Germany) No. 111 SR Motorsport by Schnitzelalm**	(Germany) No. 98 Schubert Motorsport	(France) No. 24 JSB Compétition
1	R1	(France) Paul Ricard	**(Spain) Lluc Ibáñez** (United States) Alexandre Papadopulos	**(Germany) Enrico Förderer** **(Germany) Cedric Fuchs**	(Sweden) Victor Bouveng (Sweden) Joakim Walde	(France) Julien Briché (France) Nicco Ferrarin
1	R2	(France) Paul Ricard	(Turkey) No. 12 Borusan Otomotiv Motorsport	**(Belgium) No. 87 CRT-Sport**	(Austria) No. 70 Razoon – more than racing	(France) No. 24 JSB Compétition
1	R2	(France) Paul Ricard	**(Italy) Gabriele Piana** (Germany) Thomas Rackl	**(Belgium) Lucas Cartelle** **(United States) Hudson Schwartz**	(Austria) Daniel Drexel (United Kingdom) Chris Salkeld	(France) Julien Briché (France) Nicco Ferrarin
2	R1	(Italy) Monza	(France) No. 1 Team Speedcar	**(Germany) No. 111 SR Motorsport by Schnitzelalm**	(Italy) No. 56 Lotus PB Racing	(Germany) No. 30 W&S Motorsport
2	R1	(Italy) Monza	(France) Robert Consani **(France) Benjamin Lariche**	**(Germany) Enrico Förderer** **(Germany) Cedric Fuchs**	(Italy) Maurizio Copetti (Italy) Massimiliano Schiavone	(Germany) Daniel Blickle (Germany) Max Kronberg
2	R2	(Italy) Monza	(France) No. 1 Team Speedcar	**(Germany) No. 111 SR Motorsport by Schnitzelalm**	(France) No. 3 Team Speedcar	(France) No. 44 Team Speedcar
2	R2	(Italy) Monza	**(France) Robert Consani** (France) Benjamin Lariche	**(Germany) Enrico Förderer** **(Germany) Cedric Fuchs**	(France) Viny Beltramelli (France) Sacha Bottemanne	(France) Julien Ripert
3	R1	(Belgium) Spa	(United Kingdom) No. 78 Elite Motorsport with Entire Race Engineering	**(Turkey) No. 12 Borusan Otomotiv Motorsport**	(Germany) No. 98 Schubert Motorsport	(Germany) No. 30 W&S Motorsport
3	R1	(Belgium) Spa	(United Kingdom) McKenzy Cresswell **(United Kingdom) Charlie Hart**	**(Italy) Gabriele Piana** **(Germany) Thomas Rackl**	(Sweden) Victor Bouveng (Sweden) Joakim Walde	(Germany) Daniel Blickle (Germany) Max Kronberg
3	R2	(Belgium) Spa	(United Kingdom) No. 78 Elite Motorsport with Entire Race Engineering	**(Turkey) No. 12 Borusan Otomotiv Motorsport**	(Austria) No. 70 Razoon – more than racing	(Germany) No. 30 W&S Motorsport
3	R2	(Belgium) Spa	**(United Kingdom) McKenzy Cresswell** (United Kingdom) Charlie Hart	**(Italy) Gabriele Piana** **(Germany) Thomas Rackl**	(Austria) Daniel Drexel (United Kingdom) Chris Salkeld	(Germany) Daniel Blickle (Germany) Max Kronberg
4	R1	(Italy) Misano	(France) No. 1 Team Speedcar	**(United Kingdom) No. 78 Elite Motorsport with Entire Race Engineering**	(United Kingdom) No. 71 Elite Motorsport with Entire Race Engineering	(Germany) No. 30 W&S Motorsport
4	R1	(Italy) Misano	(France) Robert Consani **(France) Benjamin Lariche**	**(United Kingdom) McKenzy Cresswell** **(United Kingdom) Charlie Hart**	(United Kingdom) Ravi Ramyead (United Kingdom) Charlie Robertson	(Germany) Daniel Blickle (Germany) Max Kronberg
4	R2	(Italy) Misano	(France) No. 8 Team Speedcar	**(France) No. 8 Team Speedcar**	(France) No. 3 Team Speedcar	No. 55 Toyota Gazoo Racing Sweden
4	R2	(Italy) Misano	(France) Grégory Guilvert **(France) Paul Petit**	**(France) Grégory Guilvert** **(France) Paul Petit**	(France) Viny Beltramelli (France) Sacha Bottemanne	(Sweden) Christoffer Brunnhagen (Sweden) Mikael Brunnhagen
5	R1	(Netherlands) Zandvoort	(France) No. 8 Team Speedcar	**(United Kingdom) No. 78 Elite Motorsport with Entire Race Engineering**	(France) No. 3 Team Speedcar	No. 55 Toyota Gazoo Racing Sweden
5	R1	(Netherlands) Zandvoort	**(France) Grégory Guilvert** (France) Paul Petit	**(United Kingdom) McKenzy Cresswell** **(United Kingdom) Charlie Hart**	(France) Viny Beltramelli (France) Sacha Bottemanne	(Sweden) Christoffer Brunnhagen (Sweden) Mikael Brunnhagen
5	R2	(Netherlands) Zandvoort	(United Kingdom) No. 78 Elite Motorsport with Entire Race Engineering	**(United Kingdom) No. 78 Elite Motorsport with Entire Race Engineering**	(France) No. 3 Team Speedcar	(Germany) No. 30 W&S Motorsport
5	R2	(Netherlands) Zandvoort	**(United Kingdom) McKenzy Cresswell** (United Kingdom) Charlie Hart	**(United Kingdom) McKenzy Cresswell** **(United Kingdom) Charlie Hart**	(France) Viny Beltramelli (France) Sacha Bottemanne	(Germany) Daniel Blickle (Germany) Max Kronberg
6	R1	(Portugal) Portimão	(Germany) No. 31 W&S Motorsport	**(Germany) No. 110 SR Motorsport by Schnitzelalm**	(United Kingdom) No. 71 Elite Motorsport with Entire Race Engineering	(Germany) No. 30 W&S Motorsport
6	R1	(Portugal) Portimão	**(Israel) Alon Gabbay** (United States) Tim Horrell	**(Germany) Jay Mo Härtling** **(Germany) Joel Mesch**	(United Kingdom) Ravi Ramyead (United Kingdom) Charlie Robertson	(Germany) Daniel Blickle (Germany) Max Kronberg
6	R2	(Portugal) Portimão	(United Kingdom) No. 78 Elite Motorsport with Entire Race Engineering	**(France) No. 8 Team Speedcar**	(France) No. 3 Team Speedcar	(Germany) No. 30 W&S Motorsport
6	R2	(Portugal) Portimão	**(United Kingdom) McKenzy Cresswell** (United Kingdom) Charlie Hart	**(France) Grégory Guilvert** **(France) Paul Petit**	(France) Viny Beltramelli (France) Sacha Bottemanne	(Germany) Daniel Blickle (Germany) Max Kronberg

=== Scoring system ===
Championship points are awarded for the first ten positions in each race. Entries are required to complete 75% of the winning car's race distance in order to be classified and earn points.

Position	**1st**	**2nd**	**3rd**	**4th**	**5th**	**6th**	**7th**	**8th**	**9th**	**10th**	**Pole**
Points	25	18	15	12	10	8	6	4	2	1	1

=== Drivers' standings ===
==== Silver drivers' standings ====
Pos.	Driver	Team	LEC (France)		MON (Italy)		SPA (Belgium)		MIS (Italy)		ZAN (Netherlands)		POR (Portugal)		Points
1	(United Kingdom) McKenzy Cresswell (United Kingdom) Charlie Hart	(United Kingdom) Elite Motorsport with Entire Race Engineering	23	8	20	6	2**^{P}**	2**^{P}**	1	Ret	1	1**^{P}**	Ret	2**^{P}**	145
2	(Germany) Enrico Förderer (Germany) Cedric Fuchs	(Germany) SR Motorsport by Schnitzelalm	1	4	1	1	9	5	12	8	10	13	6	3	137
3	(Italy) Gabriele Piana (Germany) Thomas Rackl	(Turkey) Borusan Otomotiv Motorsport	Ret	5**^{P}**	9	12	1	1	Ret	4	7	3	Ret	6	112
4	(France) Grégory Guilvert (France) Paul Petit	(France) Team Speedcar	5	6	4	33	38	36	2	1**^{P}**	32**^{P}**	Ret	10	1	108
5	(United States) Sam Paley	(Belgium) TeamFloral	Ret	19	2	14	4	3	26	3	6	2	5	Ret	102
6	(Australia) Lachlan Evennett (Netherlands) Mees Houben	(Portugal) Speedy Motorsport	2	16	Ret	WD	10	8	3	7	2	5	7	7	91
7	(Belgium) Lucas Cartelle (United States) Hudson Schwartz	(Belgium) CRT-Sport	Ret	1	3	5	37	9	6	6	Ret	22	Ret	5	80
8	(France) Robert Consani (France) Benjamin Lariche	(France) Team Speedcar	8	Ret	37**^{P}**	2**^{P}**	Ret	4	Ret**^{P}**	2	4	4	23	22	79
9	(Belgium) Yani Stevenheydens	(United Kingdom) Elite Motorsport with Entire Race Engineering	7	36	10	24	3	13	5	27	3	27	2**^{P}**	11	71
10	(Spain) Lluc Ibáñez (United States) Alexandre Papadopulos	(Spain) NM Racing Team	3**^{P}**	3	11	15	6	6	30	11	8	6	25	16	62
11	(Belgium) Michiel Haverans	(Belgium) TeamFloral	Ret	19	2	14	4	3	26	3					61
11	(Belgium) Michiel Haverans	(United Kingdom) Academy Motorsport									23	26			61
12	(Luxembourg) Clément Seyler	(Switzerland) Racing Spirit of Léman	6	2	38	WD	16	20	4	5	19	16	Ret	23	48
12	(Brazil) Pedro Garcia	(Switzerland) Racing Spirit of Léman	6	2	38	WD	16	20	4	5	19	16			48
13	(United Kingdom) Henry Joslyn	Toyota Gazoo Racing Sweden	15	9	15	Ret	35	Ret	Ret	Ret					38
13	(United Kingdom) Henry Joslyn	(United Kingdom) Elite Motorsport with Entire Race Engineering									3	27	2**^{P}**	11	38
14	(Germany) Joel Mesch	(Germany) SR Motorsport by Schnitzelalm					15	Ret	15	18			1	4	37
15	(United Kingdom) Harri Reynolds	(United Kingdom) Elite Motorsport with Entire Race Engineering	7	36	10	24	3	13	5	27					35
16	(United States) Erik Evans	(United Kingdom) Academy Motorsport	4	7	12	18	7	35	16	29	11	7	Ret	8	35
17	(Belgium) Nathan Vanspringel	(United Kingdom) Academy Motorsport	4	7	12	18	7	35	16	29	11	7			31
18	(Australia) Cameron McLeod	(United Kingdom) Academy Motorsport			7	3							Ret	8	29
19	(Canada) Marco Signoretti	(United Kingdom) Academy Motorsport	9	15	7	3									27
20	(France) Roméo Leurs	(Spain) Mirage Racing	28	33	24	21	5	21	17	9	5	Ret	Ret	Ret	22
20	(Brazil) Roberto Faria	(Spain) Mirage Racing					5	21	17	9	5	Ret	Ret	Ret	22
21	(Netherlands) Leon van Verseveld (Netherlands) Bas Visser	(Netherlands) JW Raceservice	18	21	8	13	13	12	28	21	12	8			15
22	(Portugal) Tomás Guedes (Portugal) Pedro Perino	(Portugal) Speedy Motorsport	13	10	14	17	12	Ret	10	12	9	15	13	15	14
23	(Switzerland) Julien Apotheloz	(Germany) SR Motorsport by Schnitzelalm			19	4	15	Ret							12
23	(Germany) Marcel Marchewicz	(Germany) SR Motorsport by Schnitzelalm			19	4									12
24	(Netherlands) Ruben del Sarte (United Kingdom) James Sherrington	(Spain) Mirage Racing	17	18	Ret	Ret	20	11	18	19	16	18	12	31	8
25	(United Kingdom) Georgi Dimitrov (United Kingdom) Jack Mitchell	(France) CMR			16	8									6
25	(Republic of Ireland) Colin Cronin	(United Kingdom) Race Lab	31	Ret	25	Ret	26	32	8	Ret	33	Ret	Ret	14	6
25	(Australia) Jayden Kelly	(United Kingdom) Race Lab							8	Ret					6
26	(Turkey) Bati Ege Yildirim (Turkey) Yağiz Gedik	(Turkey) Borusan Otomotiv Motorsport	Ret	17	36	Ret			13	13	13	19	14	13	4
27	(Sweden) Maximilian Boström	Toyota Gazoo Racing Sweden	15	9	15	Ret	35	Ret	Ret	Ret	21	28	20	20	3
28	(United States) Jenson Altzman	(United Kingdom) Academy Motorsport	9	15											2
–	(Romania) Sergiu Nicolae	(Romania) Willi Motorsport	25	22	30	WD	27	25	14	24					0
–	(Romania) Tudor Tudurachi	(Romania) Willi Motorsport	25	22	30	WD	27	25	14	24	31	25			0
–	(Macau) Weng Hin Liu	(Germany) SR Motorsport by Schnitzelalm							15	18					0
–	(Denmark) Victor Nielsen	(Spain) Mirage Racing			24	21									0
–	(Germany) Philip Wiskirchen	(Germany) ME Motorsport					36	Ret			22	Ret			0
–	(Republic of Ireland) Robert Cronin	(United Kingdom) Race Lab	31	Ret	25	Ret	26	32							0
–	(France) Hugo Conde	(Spain) Mirage Racing	28	33											0
–	(Germany) Linus Hahne	(Germany) ME Motorsport					36	Ret							0
Guest drivers ineligible to score points
–	(Germany) Jay Mo Härtling	(Germany) SR Motorsport by Schnitzelalm											1	4	0
–	(Austria) Kiano Blum	(Belgium) TeamFloral									6	2	5	Ret	0
–	(United Kingdom) George King	(United Kingdom) Race Lab									33	Ret	Ret	14	0
–	(Italy) Simone Bianco	Toyota Gazoo Racing Sweden											20	20	0
–	(Spain) Javier Sagrera	Toyota Gazoo Racing Sweden									21	28			0
–	(Austria) Lukas Stiefelhagen	(Germany) ME Motorsport									22	Ret			0
–	(United Kingdom) William Lucas	(United Kingdom) Academy Motorsport									23	26			0
–	(Switzerland) David Kullmann	(Switzerland) Racing Spirit of Léman											Ret	23	0
–	(Ukraine) Ivan Klymenko	(Romania) Willi Motorsport									31	25			0
Pos.	Driver	Team	LEC (France)		MON (Italy)		SPA (Belgium)		MIS (Italy)		ZAN (Netherlands)		POR (Portugal)		Points

Key
Colour	Result
Gold	Race winner
Silver	2nd place
Bronze	3rd place
Green	Points finish
Blue	Non-points finish
Blue	Non-classified finish (NC)
Purple	Did not finish (Ret)
Black	Disqualified (DSQ)
Black	Excluded (EX)
White	Did not start (DNS)
White	Race cancelled (C)
White	Withdrew (WD)
Blank	Did not participate

**^{P}** – Pole

==== Pro-Am drivers' standings ====
Pos.	Driver	Team	LEC (France)		MON (Italy)		SPA (Belgium)		MIS (Italy)		ZAN (Netherlands)		POR (Portugal)		Points
1	(Sweden) Victor Bouveng (Sweden) Joakim Walde	(Germany) Schubert Motorsport	10**^{P}**	13	6	9	8	14	9	16	27	14	16	21	182
2	(France) Viny Beltramelli (France) Sacha Bottemanne	(France) Team Speedcar	36	Ret	Ret**^{P}**	7**^{P}**	14	17	25	10**^{P}**	14**^{P}**	9**^{P}**	4	9**^{P}**	176
3	(United Kingdom) Ravi Ramyead (United Kingdom) Charlie Robertson	(United Kingdom) Elite Motorsport with Entire Race Engineering	24	23	18	26	22**^{P}**	10	7**^{P}**	Ret	15	12	3	12	151
4	(Austria) Daniel Drexel (United Kingdom) Chris Salkeld	(Austria) Razoon – more than racing	19	11	22	23	29	7	24	22	24	17	18	24	116
5	(San Marino) Davide Meloni (San Marino) Paolo Meloni	(San Marino) W&D Racing Team	20	25	17	16	23	16	11	15	28	Ret	19	26	96
6	(Sweden) Edvin Hellsten (Sweden) Daniel Nilsson	(Sweden) Nova Racing	16	14	29	29	25	18	Ret	17	18	10	Ret	17	87
7	(Israel) Alon Gabbay (United States) Tim Horrell	(Germany) W&S Motorsport	21	30	27	25	Ret	28	29	Ret	17	11	8**^{P}**	16	73
8	(Germany) Joachim Bölting (Germany) Hendrik Still	(Germany) W&S Motorsport	12	20	33	Ret	18	24	21	20	20	23			73
9	(Turkey) Önder Erdem (Switzerland) Gustavo Xavier	(Austria) Razoon – more than racing	14	28	21	32	Ret	22	20	23	26	21			59
10	(Italy) Maurizio Copetti (Italy) Massimiliano Schiavone	(Italy) Lotus PB Racing	30	Ret	5	20	Ret	37	22	Ret					41
11	(Spain) Max Huber (Spain) Maximus Mayer	(Spain) NM Racing Team	27	31	26	22	24	Ret	Ret	DNS	25	Ret	15	27	35
12	(Turkey) Bati Ege Yildirim (Turkey) Yağiz Gedik	(Turkey) Borusan Otomotiv Motorsport					11	15**^{P}**							31
13	(France) Florent Grizaud	(Switzerland) Racing Spirit of Léman	29	34	32	27	28	26	27	14	Ret	24			22
13	(Switzerland) David Kullmann	(Switzerland) Racing Spirit of Léman			32	27	28	26	27	14	Ret	24			22
14	(France) Julien Briché (France) Nicco Ferrarin	(France) JSB Compétition			34	11	Ret	34	Ret	Ret	Ret	Ret	26	32	18
15	(Italy) Paolo Gnemmi (Italy) Riccardo Pera	(Italy) Ebimotors			30	10									15
16	(United Kingdom) Daniel Lavery (United Kingdom) Darren Turner	(United Kingdom) Full Send Racing Limited					17	Ret							12
16	(Italy) Massimo Abbati (Italy) Stefano d'Aste	(Italy) Lotus PB Racing	26	24	Ret	28	39	33	Ret	25					12
17	(France) Laurent Hurgon (France) Lazare Lartigau	(France) Chazel Technologie Course					21	23							10
18	(Netherlands) Calvin De Groot (United States) Ross Poole	(Germany) SRS Team Sorg Rennsport			23	30	33	29							6
19	(France) Hugo Mogica (France) Thibaut Mogica	(France) CMR	35	29**^{P}**	DNS	WD	31	Ret							3
–	(Australia) Diesel Thomas (Australia) Joshua Thomas	(Spain) NM Racing Team					32	27							0
–	(France) Louka Desgranges	(Switzerland) Racing Spirit of Léman	29	34											0
–	(Sweden) Stefan Nilsson (Sweden) Daniel Varverud	(Sweden) Lestrup Racing Team					30	30							0
–	(Romania) Eric Bodgan Ciorioanu (Romania) Adrian Zelca	(Romania) Willi Motorsport	34	35											0
Guest drivers ineligible to score points
–	(Portugal) Francisco Mora (Portugal) José Carlos Pires	Toyota Gazoo Racing Caetano Portugal											9	10	0
–	(United States) Michael Tosi (Belgium) Nathan Vanspringel	(United Kingdom) Academy Motorsport											11	29	0
–	(Portugal) Nuno Afonso (Portugal) Alexandre Areia	(Portugal) Gianfranco Motorsport											24	19	0
–	(France) Mathieu Martins (Portugal) Vasco Oliveira	(Portugal) Racar Motorsport											22	33	0
Pos.	Driver	Team	LEC (France)		MON (Italy)		SPA (Belgium)		MIS (Italy)		ZAN (Netherlands)		POR (Portugal)		Points

==== Am drivers' standings ====
Pos.	Driver	Team	LEC (France)		MON (Italy)		SPA (Belgium)		MIS (Italy)		ZAN (Netherlands)		POR (Portugal)		Points
1	(Germany) Daniel Blickle	(Germany) W&S Motorsport	22	26	13**^{P}**	Ret	19	19**^{P}**	19	28**^{P}**	30	20**^{P}**	17**^{P}**	25**^{P}**	217
1	(Germany) Max Kronberg	(Germany) W&S Motorsport			13**^{P}**	Ret	19	19**^{P}**	19	28**^{P}**	30	20**^{P}**	17**^{P}**	25**^{P}**	217
2	(Sweden) Christoffer Brunnhagen (Sweden) Mikael Brunnhagen	Toyota Gazoo Racing Sweden	32	27	28	31	34**^{P}**	Ret	23**^{P}**	26	29**^{P}**	DSQ	Ret	28	173
3	(France) Julien Ripert	(France) Team Speedcar	33	32	31	19**^{P}**	Ret	31							83
4	(France) Julien Briché (France) Nicco Ferrarin	(France) JSB Compétition	11**^{P}**	11**^{P}**											52
5	(Germany) Moritz Berrenberg	(Germany) W&S Motorsport	22	26											36
6	(Germany) Joachim Bölting	(Germany) W&S Motorsport											21	30	33
Pos.	Driver	Team	LEC (France)		MON (Italy)		SPA (Belgium)		MIS (Italy)		ZAN (Netherlands)		POR (Portugal)		Points

=== Teams' standings ===
==== Silver teams' standings ====
Pos.	Team	LEC (France)		MON (Italy)		SPA (Belgium)		MIS (Italy)		ZAN (Netherlands)		POR (Portugal)		Points
1	(United Kingdom) Elite Motorsport with Entire Race Engineering	7	8	10	6	2**^{P}**	2**^{P}**	1	27	1	1**^{P}**	2**^{P}**	2**^{P}**	176
2	(France) Team Speedcar	5	6	4**^{P}**	2**^{P}**	38	4	2**^{P}**	1**^{P}**	4**^{P}**	4	10	1	170
3	(Germany) SR Motorsport by Schnitzelalm	1	4	1	1	9	5	12	8	10	13	1	3	161
4	(Turkey) Borusan Otomotiv Motorsport	Ret	5**^{P}**	9	12	1	1	13	4	7	3	14	6	131
5	(Belgium) TeamFloral	Ret	19	2	14	4	3	26	3	6	2	5	Ret	111
6	(Portugal) Speedy Motorsport	2	10	14	17	10	8	3	7	2	5	7	7	101
7	(Belgium) CRT-Sport	Ret	1	3	5	37	9	6	6	Ret	22	Ret	5	88
8	(Spain) NM Racing Team	3**^{P}**	3	11	15	6	6	30	11	8	6	25	16	72
9	(United Kingdom) Academy Motorsport	4	7	7	3	7	35	16	29	11	7	Ret	8	66
10	(Switzerland) Racing Spirit of Léman	6	2	38	WD	16	20	4	5	19	16	Ret	23	52
11	(Spain) Mirage Racing	17	18	24	21	5	11	17	9	5	18	12	31	40
12	(Netherlands) JW Raceservice	18	21	8	13	13	12	28	21	12	8			22
13	(United Kingdom) Race Lab	31	Ret	25	Ret	26	32	8	Ret	33	Ret	Ret	14	12
14	Toyota Gazoo Racing Sweden	15	9	15	Ret	35	Ret	Ret	Ret	21	28	20	20	11
15	(France) CMR			16	8									8
16	(Romania) Willi Motorsport	25	22	35	WD	27	25	14	24	31	25			2
–	(Germany) ME Motorsport					36	Ret			22	Ret			0
Pos.	Team	LEC (France)		MON (Italy)		SPA (Belgium)		MIS (Italy)		ZAN (Netherlands)		POR (Portugal)		Points

==== Pro-Am teams' standings ====
Pos.	Team	LEC (France)		MON (Italy)		SPA (Belgium)		MIS (Italy)		ZAN (Netherlands)		POR (Portugal)		Points
1	(Germany) Schubert Motorsport	10**^{P}**	13	6	9	8	14	9	16	27	14	16	21	182
2	(France) Team Speedcar	36	Ret	Ret**^{P}**	7**^{P}**	14	17	25	10**^{P}**	14**^{P}**	9**^{P}**	4	9**^{P}**	178
3	(United Kingdom) Elite Motorsport with Entire Race Engineering	24	23	18	26	22**^{P}**	10	7**^{P}**	Ret	15	12	3	12	159
4	(Germany) W&S Motorsport	12	14	27	25	18	18	21	17	17	11	8**^{P}**	16	136
5	(Austria) Razoon – more than racing	14	11	21	23	29	7	20	22	24	17	18	24	129
6	(San Marino) W&D Racing Team	20	25	17	16	23	16	11	15	28	Ret	19	26	101
7	(Italy) Lotus PB Racing	26	24	5	20	39	33	22	25					65
8	(Spain) NM Racing Team	27	31	26	22	24	27	Ret	DNS	25	Ret	15	27	45
9	(Switzerland) Racing Spirit of Léman	29	34	32	27	28	26	27	14	Ret	24			38
10	(Turkey) Borusan Otomotiv Motorsport					11	15**^{P}**							31
11	(Sweden) Nova Racing									18	10	Ret	17	30
12	(Italy) Ebimotors			30	10									17
13	(France) JSB Compétition			34	11	Ret	34	Ret	Ret	Ret	Ret	26	32	14
14	(United Kingdom) Full Send Racing Limited					17	Ret							12
14	Toyota Gazoo Racing Caetano Portugal											9	10	12
15	(France) Chazel Technologie Course					21	23							12
16	(United Kingdom) Academy Motorsport											11	29	10
17	(France) CMR	35	29**^{P}**	DNS	WD	31	Ret							8
18	(Germany) SRS Team Sorg Rennsport			23	30	33	29							8
19	(Romania) Willi Motorsport	34	35											3
20	(Portugal) Racar Motorsport											22	33	1
–	(Portugal) Gianfranco Motorsport											24	19	0
–	(Sweden) Lestrup Racing Team					30	30							0
Pos.	Team	LEC (France)		MON (Italy)		SPA (Belgium)		MIS (Italy)		ZAN (Netherlands)		POR (Portugal)		Points

==== Am teams' standings ====
Pos.	Team	LEC (France)		MON (Italy)		SPA (Belgium)		MIS (Italy)		ZAN (Netherlands)		POR (Portugal)		Points
1	(Germany) W&S Motorsport	22	26	13**^{P}**	Ret	19	19**^{P}**	19	28**^{P}**	30	20**^{P}**	17**^{P}**	25**^{P}**	253
2	Toyota Gazoo Racing Sweden	32	27	28	31	34**^{P}**	Ret	23**^{P}**	26	29**^{P}**	DSQ	Ret	28	173
3	(France) Team Speedcar	33	32	31	19**^{P}**	Ret	31							83
4	(France) JSB Compétition	11**^{P}**	11**^{P}**											52
Pos.	Team	LEC (France)		MON (Italy)		SPA (Belgium)		MIS (Italy)		ZAN (Netherlands)		POR (Portugal)		Points

== See also ==
- 2026 British GT Championship
- 2026 French GT4 Cup
- 2026 GT4 Italian Series
- 2026 GT4 America Series
- 2026 GT4 Australia Series
- 2026 SRO GT Cup
- 2026 SRO Japan Cup
