= 2026 Porsche Carrera Cup Great Britain =

One-make motor racing series in the UK

The 2026 Porsche Carwow Carrera Cup Great Britain was a multi-event, one-make motor racing championship held across England and Scotland. The championship featured a mix of professional motor racing teams and privately funded drivers. It formed a part of the extensive program of support categories built up around the BTCC centrepiece.

== Race calendar ==
Round		Circuit	Date
1	R1	Donington Park (National Circuit, Leicestershire)	18–19 April
1	R2	Donington Park (National Circuit, Leicestershire)	18–19 April
2	R3	Brands Hatch (Indy Circuit, Kent)	9–10 May
2	R4	Brands Hatch (Indy Circuit, Kent)	9–10 May
3	R5	Snetterton Circuit (Norfolk)	23–24 May
3	R6	Snetterton Circuit (Norfolk)	23–24 May
4	R7	Thruxton Circuit (Hampshire)	25–26 July
4	R8	Thruxton Circuit (Hampshire)	25–26 July
5	R9	Donington Park (Grand Prix Circuit, Leicestershire)	22–23 August
5	R10	Donington Park (Grand Prix Circuit, Leicestershire)	22–23 August
6	R11	Croft (North Yorkshire)	5–6 September
6	R12	Croft (North Yorkshire)	5–6 September
7	R13	Silverstone Circuit (National Circuit, Northamptonshire)	26–27 September
7	R14	Silverstone Circuit (National Circuit, Northamptonshire)	26–27 September
8	R15	Brands Hatch (Grand Prix Circuit, Kent)	10–11 October
8	R16	Brands Hatch (Grand Prix Circuit, Kent)	10–11 October

== Team and drivers ==
Team	No.	Driver	Class	Rounds
(United Kingdom) Century Motorsport	9	(Republic of Ireland) Michael Keohane	M	1–7
(United Kingdom) Century Motorsport	22	(United Kingdom) Carl Cavers	M	1–7
(United Kingdom) Century Motorsport	58	(United Kingdom) Henry Dawes	M	1–2, 5
(United Kingdom) JTR	12	(United Kingdom) Jonathan Moore	PA	1–7
(United Kingdom) JTR	48	(United Kingdom) Ollie Jackson	PA	1–7
(United Kingdom) Graves Motorsport	27	(United Kingdom) Jacob Tofts	PA	1–7
(United Kingdom) Graves Motorsport	71	(United Kingdom) Max Coates	P	1–7
(United Kingdom) Graves Motorsport	99	(United Kingdom) Sid Smith	P	1–7
(United Kingdom) Rosland Gold by Century Motorsport	29	(United Kingdom) Isaac Phelps	P	1–7
(United Kingdom) Rosland Gold by Century Motorsport	35	(United Kingdom) Callum Voisin	P	1–7
(United Kingdom) Team Parker Racing	30	(United Kingdom) Will Jenkins	P	1–7
(United Kingdom) Team Parker Racing	43	(United Kingdom) Archie Clark	P	1–7
(United Kingdom) Team Parker Racing	78	(United Kingdom) Jack Sherwood	P	1–7
(United Kingdom) Team Parker Racing	88	(United Kingdom) Oliver Meadows	PA	1–7
(United Kingdom) XQS Team Parker Racing	67	(United Kingdom) Stephen Jelley	PA	1–7

Icon	Class
P	Pro Cup
PA	Pro-Am Cup
M	Masters Cup
	Guest Starter

== Race results ==
Round		Circuit	Pole position	Pro winner	Pro-Am winner	Masters winner
1	R1	Donington Park (National Circuit)	(United Kingdom) Will Jenkins	(United Kingdom) Callum Voisin	(United Kingdom) Ollie Jackson	(United Kingdom) Henry Dawes
1	R2	Donington Park (National Circuit)		(United Kingdom) Will Jenkins	(United Kingdom) Ollie Jackson	(United Kingdom) Henry Dawes
2	R3	Brands Hatch (Indy Circuit)	(United Kingdom) Will Jenkins	(United Kingdom) Callum Voisin	(United Kingdom) Stephen Jelley	(United Kingdom) Carl Cavers
2	R4	Brands Hatch (Indy Circuit)	(United Kingdom) Callum Voisin	(United Kingdom) Callum Voisin	(United Kingdom) Jacob Tofts	(Republic of Ireland) Michael Keohane
3	R5	Snetterton Circuit	(United Kingdom) Sid Smith	(United Kingdom) Callum Voisin	(United Kingdom) Ollie Jackson	(United Kingdom) Carl Cavers
3	R6	Snetterton Circuit	(United Kingdom) Will Jenkins	(United Kingdom) Will Jenkins	(United Kingdom) Stephen Jelley	(United Kingdom) Carl Cavers
4	R7	Thruxton Circuit	(United Kingdom) Callum Voisin	(United Kingdom) Callum Voisin	(United Kingdom) Stephen Jelley	(United Kingdom) Carl Cavers
4	R8	Thruxton Circuit	(United Kingdom) Max Coates	(United Kingdom) Max Coates	(United Kingdom) Stephen Jelley	(Republic of Ireland) Michael Keohane
5	R9	Donington Park (Grand Prix Circuit)	(United Kingdom) Callum Voisin	(United Kingdom) Callum Voisin	(United Kingdom) Stephen Jelley	(United Kingdom) Henry Dawes
5	R10	Donington Park (Grand Prix Circuit)	(United Kingdom) Callum Voisin	(United Kingdom) Callum Voisin	(United Kingdom) Jacob Tofts	(United Kingdom) Henry Dawes
6	R11	Croft	(United Kingdom) Callum Voisin	(United Kingdom) Callum Voisin	(United Kingdom) Stephen Jelley	(Republic of Ireland) Michael Keohane
6	R12	Croft		(United Kingdom) Sid Smith	(United Kingdom) Stephen Jelley	(Republic of Ireland) Michael Keohane
7	R13	Silverstone Circuit (National Circuit)	(United Kingdom) Isaac Phelps	(United Kingdom) Isaac Phelps	(United Kingdom) Jonathan Moore	(United Kingdom) Carl Cavers
7	R14	Silverstone Circuit (National Circuit)	(United Kingdom) Jonathan Moore	(United Kingdom) Jack Sherwood	(United Kingdom) Ollie Jackson	(Republic of Ireland) Michael Keohane
8	R15	Brands Hatch (Grand Prix Circuit)	(United Kingdom) Callum Voisin	(United Kingdom) Callum Voisin	(United Kingdom) Jacob Tofts	(United Kingdom) Henry Dawes
8	R16	Brands Hatch (Grand Prix Circuit)	(United Kingdom) Will Jenkins	(United Kingdom) Callum Voisin	(United Kingdom) Jacob Tofts	(United Kingdom) Henry Dawes

== Results and standings ==
Points system
	1st	2nd	3rd	4th	5th	6th	7th	8th	Pole	FL
Race 1 (Pro)	12	10	8	6	4	3	2	1	2	1
Race 2 (All Classes)	10	8	6	5	4	3	2	1	0	1

=== Drivers' championships ===
Pos.	Driver	Team	DON		BHI		SNE		THR		DON	CRO	SIL	BHGP	Pen	Pts
Pro Class
1	(United Kingdom) Callum Voisin	(United Kingdom) Rosland Gold by Century Motorsport	1	3	1	1	1	2	1	3					0	80
2	(United Kingdom) Will Jenkins	(United Kingdom) Team Parker Racing	2	2	2	4	2	1	2	10					0	68
3	(United Kingdom) Max Coates	(United Kingdom) Graves Motorsport	3	5	4	8	7	7	9	1					4	38
4	(United Kingdom) Jack Sherwood	(United Kingdom) Team Parker Racing	9	4	5	12	3	6	5	2					6	32
5	(United Kingdom) Sid Smith	(United Kingdom) Graves Motorsport	8	13	9	2	4	9	6	5					0	32
6	(United Kingdom) Isaac Phelps	(United Kingdom) Rosland Gold by Century Motorsport	4	7	10	5	5	3	3	8					4	32
7	(United Kingdom) Archie Clark	(United Kingdom) Team Parker Racing	7	6	6	10	6	5	4	9					0	31
Pro-Am Class
1	(United Kingdom) Stephen Jelley	(United Kingdom) XQS Team Parker Racing	6	14	3	7	9	4	7	3					0	74
2	(United Kingdom) Ollie Jackson	(United Kingdom) JTR	5	1	7	6	8	10	11	7					4	61
3	(United Kingdom) Jacob Tofts	(United Kingdom) Graves Motorsport	Ret	8	8	3	10	8	8	6					0	59
4	(United Kingdom) Oliver Meadows	(United Kingdom) Team Parker Racing	10	9	11	13	11	11	10	11					0	43
5	(United Kingdom) Jonathan Moore	(United Kingdom) JTR	11	11	Ret	9	12	Ret	12	12					4	23
Master Class
1	(United Kingdom) Carl Cavers	(United Kingdom) Century Motorsport	13	12	12	14	13	12	13	14					0	79
2	(Republic of Ireland) Michael Keohane	(United Kingdom) Century Motorsport	Ret	Ret	Ret	11	Ret	13	14	13					0	39
3	(United Kingdom) Henry Dawes	(United Kingdom) Century Motorsport	12	10	WD	WD									0	22
Pos.	Driver	Team	DON		BHI		SNE		THR		DON	CRO	SIL	BHGP	Pen	Pts
