= Elite Motorsport =

British auto racing team

(United Kingdom) Elite Motorsport
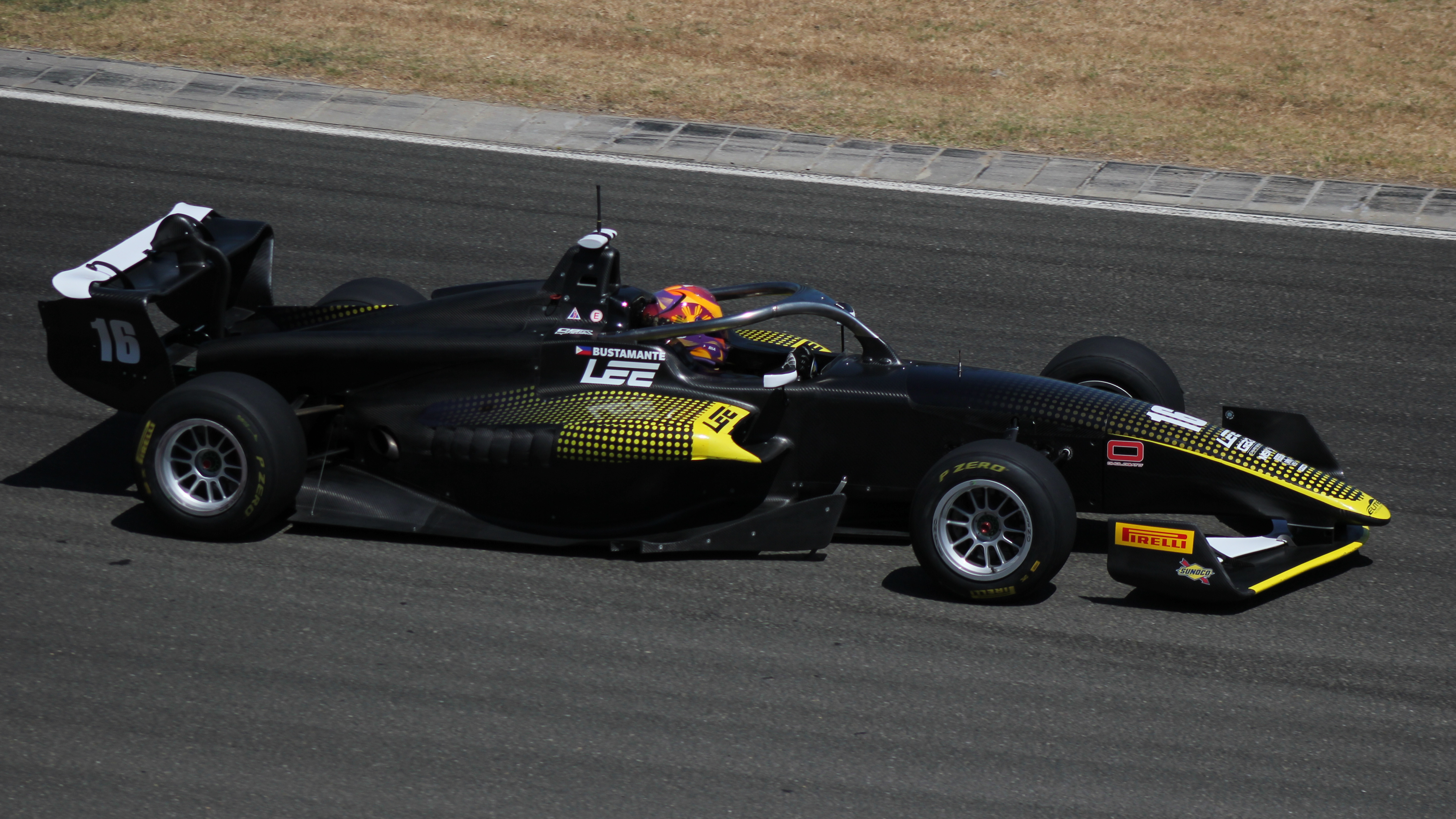
- Founded: 2011
- Base: Norfolk, England
- Team principal(s): Eddie Ives
- Founder(s): Eddie Ives
- Current series: GB3 Championship; GB4 Championship; Ginetta Junior Championship; Ginetta GT Championship; GT4 European Series; International GT Open
- Current drivers: See § Current drivers
- Teams' Championships: GB4 Championship: 2025, 2026
- Drivers' Championships: GB4 Championship: 2025: Ary Bansal
- Website: www.elitemotorsport.co.uk

Elite Motorsport is a British auto racing team. A mainstay in the national junior single-seater scene, it participates in the GB3 Championship, GB4 Championship as well as Ginetta one-make series, including the Ginetta Junior Championship. It is also active in sports car racing, fielding a McLaren in the GT4 European Series before stepping up to the International GT Open with Ferrari.

Notable past drivers for the team include Adam Smalley, Harry King, Louis Foster, John Bennett, and Will Macintyre.

== History ==
=== Early years ===
According to Elite Motorsport's website, the team was established in late 2011 by Eddie Ives to design, develop and build their purposed race cars, as well as compete in 750 Motor Club's racing series.

In 2014, Elite Motorsport ran their chassis (named Elite Pulse) in Sport Specials, before purchasing a Ginetta G40 and entering Ginetta Junior Championship in the following year.

=== 2020–2021 ===
In November 2020, Elite Motorsport announced its GB3 Championship (then known as BRDC British Formula 3 Championship) debut in 2021, replacing Lanan Racing. In its BRDC F3 debut season, Elite Motorsport signed Javier Sagrera, Tom Lebbon and José Garfias.

In October 2021, it was announced that Elite Motorsport was one of the first eight teams committed with GB4 for the 2022 season.

=== 2022–2024 ===
For the 2022 GB3 season, Tom Lebbon remained with Elite Motorsport. The team signed James Hedley and John Bennett for remaining two cars. Later, James Hedley switched to JHR Developments from the fifth round. Ayato Iwasaki joined Elite Motorsport for the final round.

In 2023, the team signed Oliver Stewart and McKenzy Cresswell for the GB3 campaign, while Ayato Iwasaki remained with Elite Motorsport for a full season. However, Patrick Heuzenroeder replaced Ayato Iwasaki for the last two rounds.

In 2024 GB3 season, the team signed Jarrod Waberski and Hugo Schwarze, while retaining McKenzy Cresswell. The team also competed in GT4 European Series under partnership with Entire Race Engineering, fielding two McLaren Artura GT4s.

=== 2025–2026 ===
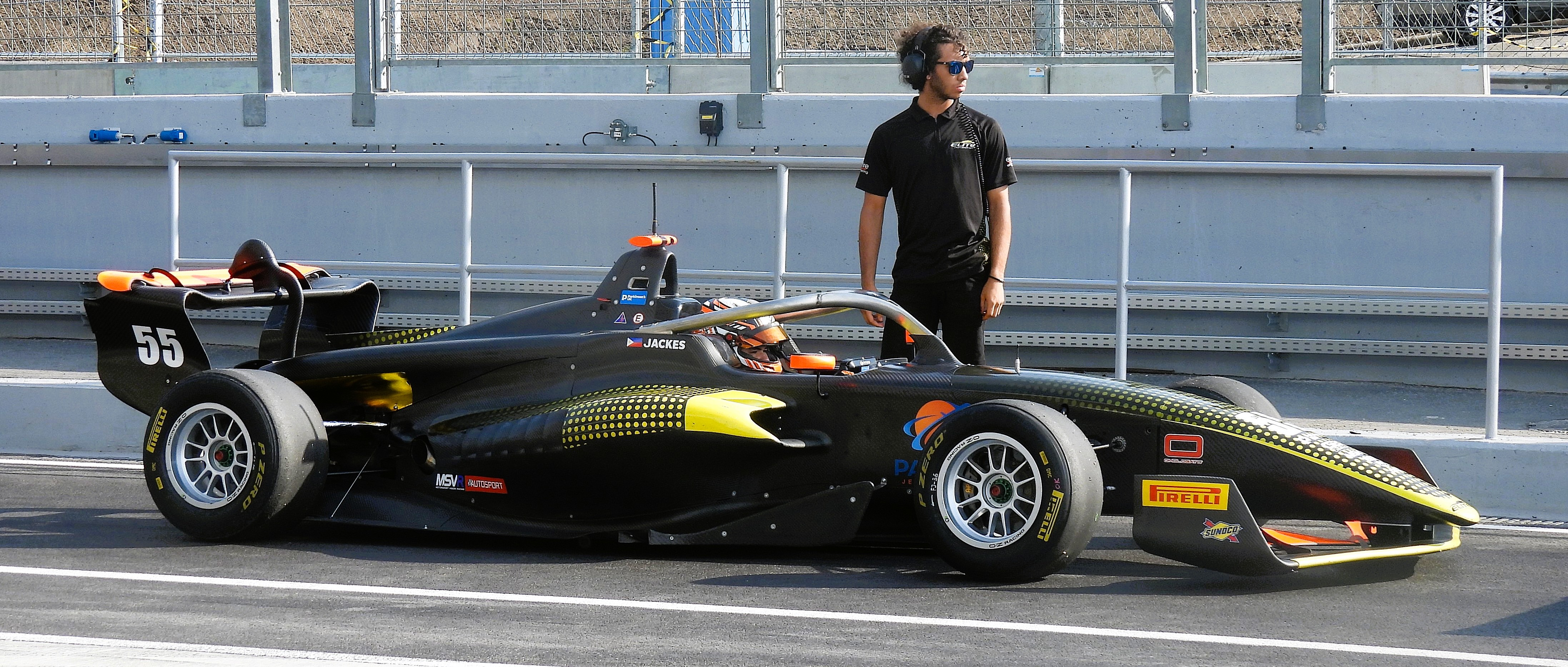
Elite Motorsport's Flynn Jackes in the Hungaroring's pit lane during the 2025 GB3 Championship.

For the GB3 campaign, the team signed Will Macintyre and two Filipina drivers: Bianca Bustamante and Flynn Jackes. Midway through the season, Macintyre was forced to step away from racing following diagnoses of lung and brain cancer, having won a race and scored two podiums. For the final round, Elite Motorsport promoted Isaac Phelps from its GB4 outfit to replace Macintyre.

Elite Motorsport also made its International GT Open debut, having purchased a Ferrari 296 GT3 in September 2024. In its debut season, Elite Motorsport signed Tom Emson and Tom Lebbon. Meanwhile, the team also competed in GT4 European Series, fielding Josh Rattican and McKenzy Cresswell in a McLaren Artura GT4.

In 2025 GB4 Championship, Ary Bansal won the Drivers' championship, driving for Elite Motorsport. The team also won the Teams' championship, ending KMR Sport's winning streak from 2022 to 2024.

For 2026, Elite Motorsport entered GB3 with Flynn Jackes, Kyuho Lee and Kirill Kutskov; GT4 European Series with a three-car entry using McLaren Artura GT4s; as well as International GT Open with Tom Emson and Tom Lebbon. In GB4, the team clinched the second consecutive team title.

== Current drivers ==
Drivers competing with Elite Motorsport in 2026
Current series	No.	Driver
GB3 Championship	17	(Kazakhstan) Kirill Kutskov
GB3 Championship	18	(Philippines) Flynn Jackes
GB3 Championship	19	(South Korea) Kyuho Lee
GB4 Championship	5	(Venezuela) Emmilio Valentino Del Grosso
GB4 Championship	51	(United Kingdom) Fred Green
GB4 Championship	77	(Israel) Matan Achituv
GT4 European Series	71	(United Kingdom) Ravi Ramyead (United Kingdom) Charlie Robertson
GT4 European Series	77	(United Kingdom) Harri Reynolds (Belgium) Yani Stevenheydens
GT4 European Series	78	(United Kingdom) McKenzy Cresswell (United Kingdom) Charlie Hart
International GT Open	17	(United Kingdom) Tom Emson (United Kingdom) Tom Lebbon
Ginetta Junior Championship	7	(Romania) Ian Danicska
Ginetta Junior Championship	8	(Netherlands) Devon Hagelen
Ginetta Junior Championship	11	(United Kingdom) Henry Cameron
Ginetta Junior Championship	12	(Spain) Daniel Oliver
Ginetta Junior Championship	24	(United Kingdom) Harrison Mackie
Ginetta Junior Championship	46	(United Kingdom) Jacob Ashcroft
Ginetta Junior Championship	67	(Ukraine) Vladislav Tomenchuk

== Current series results ==
=== GB3 Championship ===
Year	Car	Drivers	Races	Wins	Poles	F/Laps	Podiums	Points	D.C.	T.C.
2021	Tatuus-Cosworth F4-016	(United Kingdom) Tom Lebbon	24	0	0	0	1	288	9th	5th
2021	Tatuus-Cosworth F4-016	(Spain) Javier Sagrera	24	0	0	1	1	265	10th	5th
2021	Tatuus-Cosworth F4-016	(Mexico) José Garfias	15	0	0	0	0	117	17th	5th
2021	Tatuus-Cosworth F4-016	(United Kingdom) James Hedley	3	0	0	0	0	23	26th	5th
2022	Tatuus-Cosworth MSV-022	(United Kingdom) Tom Lebbon	24	4	1	1	5	363.5	3rd	3rd
2022	Tatuus-Cosworth MSV-022	(United Kingdom) John Bennett	24	0	0	0	1	262.5	8th	3rd
2022	Tatuus-Cosworth MSV-022	(United Kingdom) James Hedley†	21	0	0	0	1	156	17th	3rd
2022	Tatuus-Cosworth MSV-022	(Japan) Ayato Iwasaki	3	0	0	0	0	24	23rd	3rd
2023	Tatuus-Cosworth MSV-022	(United Kingdom) McKenzy Cresswell	23	1	1	2	8	390	4th	5th
2023	Tatuus-Cosworth MSV-022	(United Kingdom) Oliver Stewart	22	1	0	1	1	150	16th	5th
2023	Tatuus-Cosworth MSV-022	(Japan) Ayato Iwasaki	12	0	0	0	1	85	24th	5th
2023	Tatuus-Cosworth MSV-022	(Australia) Patrick Heuzenroeder	6	0	0	0	1	21	26th	5th
2024	Tatuus-Cosworth MSV-022	(United Kingdom) McKenzy Cresswell	23	2	3	1	8	376	4th	3rd
2024	Tatuus-Cosworth MSV-022	(South Africa) Jarrod Waberski	23	0	0	0	3	286	6th	3rd
2024	Tatuus-Cosworth MSV-022	(Germany) Hugo Schwarze	23	0	0	0	0	219	9th	3rd
2025	Tatuus-Cosworth MSV-025	(United Kingdom) William Macintyre	18	1	0	1	3	240	9th	7th
2025	Tatuus-Cosworth MSV-025	(Philippines) Flynn Jackes	24	0	0	0	0	94	20th	7th
2025	Tatuus-Cosworth MSV-025	(Philippines) Bianca Bustamante	24	0	0	0	0	75	22nd	7th
2025	Tatuus-Cosworth MSV-025	(United Kingdom) Isaac Phelps	3	0	0	0	0	0	NC	7th
2026	Tatuus-Cosworth MSV-2026	(Philippines) Flynn Jackes	23	1	0	1	3	255	9th	5th
2026	Tatuus-Cosworth MSV-2026	(South Korea) Kyuho Lee	23	0	0	0	0	229	10th	5th
2026	Tatuus-Cosworth MSV-2026	(Spain) Edu Robinson	6	0	0	0	1	44	23rd	5th
2026	Tatuus-Cosworth MSV-2026	(Kazakhstan) Kirill Kutskov	5	0	0	0	0	40	24th	5th
2026	Tatuus-Cosworth MSV-2026	(United Kingdom) Fred Green	3	0	0	0	0	0	NC	5th

† Hedley drove for JHR Developments from round 5 onwards.

=== GB4 Championship ===
Year	Car	Drivers	Races	Wins	Poles	F/Laps	Podiums	Points	D.C.	T.C.
2022	Tatuus F4-T014	(United Kingdom) Jack Sherwood	23	2	1	5	9	417	5th	N/A
2022	Tatuus F4-T014	(United Kingdom) Alex Walker	12	3	3	2	5	244	8th	N/A
2022	Tatuus F4-T014	(United Kingdom) William Macintyre	3	0	0	1	2	71	13th	N/A
2023	Tatuus F4-T014	(United Kingdom) Harri Reynolds	9	1	0	1	2	125	12th	6th
2023	Tatuus F4-T014	(United Kingdom) Josh Irfan	9	0	0	0	1	117	13th	6th
2023	Tatuus F4-T014	(United Kingdom) Theo Micouris	3	0	0	0	0	44	19th	6th
2023	Tatuus F4-T014	(United Kingdom) Finn Harrison	3	0	0	0	0	29	21st	6th
2024	Tatuus F4-T014	(United Kingdom) Alisha Palmowski	20	3	2	1	11	422	2nd	2nd
2024	Tatuus F4-T014	(United Kingdom) Finn Harrison	20	2	4	1	5	291	6th	2nd
2024	Tatuus F4-T014	(Isle of Man) Nick Ellis	3	0	0	0	0	29	18th	2nd
2025	Tatuus MSV GB4-025	(India) Ary Bansal	21	4	2	4	11	402	1st	1st
2025	Tatuus MSV GB4-025	(United Kingdom) Isaac Phelps	21	4	5	4	6	391	2nd	1st
2025	Tatuus MSV GB4-025	(Japan) Alexandros Kattoulas	21	1	2	2	5	319	4th	1st
2026	Tatuus MSV GB4-025	(United Kingdom) Fred Green	21	5	7	5	10	412	2nd	1st
2026	Tatuus MSV GB4-025	(Israel) Matan Achituv	21	0	0	0	2	216	10th	1st
2026	Tatuus MSV GB4-025	(Venezuela) Emmilio Valentino Del Grosso	18	0	0	1	3	209	11th	1st
2026	Tatuus MSV GB4-025	(Belgium) Yani Stevenheydens	3	1	2	2	2	75	22nd	1st

== Timeline ==
Current series
Ginetta Junior Championship	2015–present
Ginetta GT Championship	2019–present
GB3 Championship	2021–present
GB4 Championship	2022–present
GT4 European Series	2023–present
GT4 Winter Series	2024–present
International GT Open	2025–present
Former series
Ginetta GT4 Supercup	2018–2022
Mini Challenge UK	2020
French GT4 Cup	2024
