= Anglesey Circuit =

Motor racing circuit in Ty Croes, Anglesey, Wales

Anglesey Circuit (Trac Môn)

- International GP Circuit (2006–present)
- Location: Anglesey, United Kingdom
- Coordinates: 53°11′24.15″N 4°29′51.58″W
- Opened: 1997
- Major events: Current: Race of Remembrance (2014–present)
- Website: http://www.angleseycircuit.com/

International GP Circuit (2006–present)
- Length: 3.380 km (2.100 mi)
- Turns: 11
- Race lap record: 1.21.287 ( (United Kingdom) Sean Walkinshaw, Dallara F302, 2012, F3)

Coastal Circuit (2006–present)
- Length: 2.494 km (1.550 mi)
- Turns: 10
- Race lap record: 1:01.741 ( (United Kingdom) Sylvester Mullins, Gould GR37, 2009)

National Circuit (2006–present)
- Length: 1.931 km (1.200 mi)
- Turns: 6

Club Circuit (2006–present)
- Length: 1.287 km (0.800 mi)
- Turns: 4

Original Circuit (1997–2005)
- Length: 1.701 km (1.057 mi)
- Turns: 11
- Race lap record: 0:43.08 ( (United Kingdom) Luke Kidsley, Jedi MK 6, 2003)

The Anglesey Circuit (Welsh: Trac Môn) is a motor racing circuit located in Ty Croes, Anglesey, Wales. It plays host to a variety of motorsport events including car racing, motorcycle racing, car sprints, stage rallies and drifting.

It opened as a fully licensed MSA and ACU championship racing circuit in 1997. The circuit was significantly redeveloped in 2006, and as of 2019 further plans for additional development have been in place.

== History ==
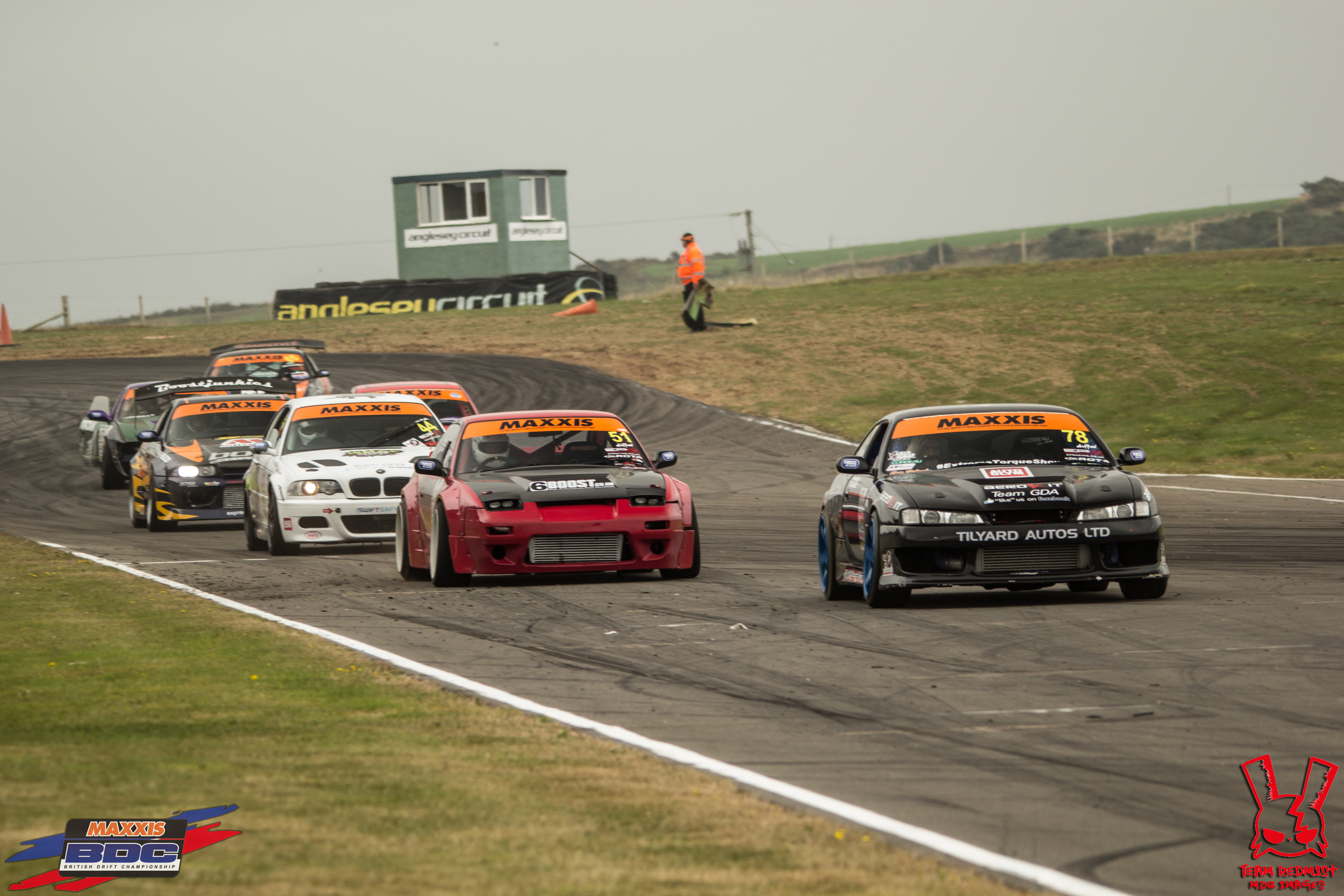
British Drift Championship at Anglesey Circuit in 2014

Anglesey Circuit is located on a former British Army and RAF facility on the island of Anglesey, just off the North coast of Wales. The facilities were decommissioned in 1992, and it would be the Wirral 100 motor racing club that first identified the opportunity for racing at Anglesey. Early races were primarily motorcycles, however it developed into being part of the British Rallycross Championship. In 1997, the facilities were upgraded and the circuit developed, along with the installation of a small permanent pitlane. It would be at this stage the circuit gained its Motor Sports Association license.

In 2006, the motorsports venue saw a major overhaul, with the majority of its 1.057 mi (1.701 km) circuit being scrapped in favour of a radical new development that includes four different track layouts: a 2.100 mi (3.380 km) International Circuit; 1.550 mi (2.494 km) Coastal Circuit, 1.200 mi (1.931 km) National Circuit and 0.800 mi (1.287 km) Club Circuit. Racing motorcyclist Peter Williams described the circuit in 2006: "The journey there is breathtaking and the circuit itself is the most scenic in the UK".

The late Welsh F1 driver, Tom Pryce, is remembered at the circuit through both having a straight named after him and since 2019 the running of the Tom Pryce Memorial Trophy at Anglesey.

In 2019, plans were submitted to redesign the circuit, and add additional paddock, garaging and hospitality facilities at the venue.

== Television ==
The TV motoring programme Fifth Gear regularly used the Anglesey circuit for the 'Shoot Out' segment of the show. The track also features as Catie's track on the CBeebies series Catie's Amazing Machines.

== Layout history ==
Original Circuit (1997–2005)

International GP Circuit (2006–present)

Coastal Circuit (2006–present)

National Circuit (2006–present)

Club Circuit (2006–present)
