= List of FIA Formula 3 Championship drivers =

This is a List of FIA Formula 3 Championship drivers, that is, a list of drivers who have made at least one race start in the FIA Formula 3 Championship, which was established in 2019.

This list is accurate up to and including the Monza round of the 2026 FIA Formula 3 Championship.

== By name ==
Key
Symbol	Meaning
*	Driver has competed in the most recent round.
^{F2}	Driver has competed in the FIA Formula 2 Championship
^{F1}	Driver has competed in Formula One
†	Driver has won the FIA Formula 3 Championship

Drivers in bold have competed in the 2026 FIA Formula 3 Championship.

Name	License	Seasons	Championship titles	Entries	Starts	Poles (Note: Reverse-grid pole positions not included.)	Wins	Podiums	Fastest Laps	Points
Enaam Ahmed	United Kingdom	2020	0	6	6	0	0	0	0	0
William Alatalo	Finland	2022	0	18	18	0	0	0	0	24
Keyvan Andres	Iran (Note: Andres is a German driver who competed under an Irani racing license.)	2019	0	16	15	0	0	0	0	0
Marcus Armstrong^{F2}	New Zealand	2019	0	16	16	1	3	7	4	158
Paul Aron^{F2}	Estonia	2023	0	18	18	0	1	4	2	112
Nazim Azman	Malaysia	2022	0	18	18	0	0	0	0	0
**Brando Badoer***	Italy	2025–2026	0	36	35	0	1	4	0	84
Taylor Barnard^{F2}	United Kingdom	2023	0	18	18	0	1	3	0	72
Ben Barnicoat	United Kingdom	2020	0	4	4	0	0	0	0	1
**Fernando Barrichello***	Brazil	2025–2026	0	18	18	0	0	0	0	2
Hugh Barter	Australia	2023	0	16	16	0	0	0	0	14
Oliver Bearman^{F2} ^{F1}	United Kingdom	2022	0	18	18	0	1	8	1	132
David Beckmann^{F2}	Germany	2019–2020	0	34	32	0	2	6	0	159.5
Nikita Bedrin	Italy (Note: Bedrin is a Russian driver competing under an Italian racing license.)	2023–2025	0	40	40	0	1	3	1	66
Dino Beganovic^{F2}	Sweden	2023–2024	0	38	38	1	2	8	3	205
Michael Belov	Russia	2020	0	6	6	0	0	0	0	1
**Brad Benavides**^{F2}	United States	2022, 2025–2026	0	38	36	2	0	0	0	27
**Nandhavud Bhirombhakdi***	Thailand	2026	0	16	15	0	0	0	0	0
Roman Bilinski^{F2}	Poland	2025	0	20	19	0	1	3	0	65
Gabriel Bortoleto^{F2} ^{F1}†	Brazil	2023	1 (2023)	18	18	1	2	6	3	164
Mari Boya^{F2}	Spain	2023–2025	0	58	57	0	2	7	2	190
Luke Browning^{F2}	United Kingdom	2023–2024	0	38	38	2	2	4	3	169
Olli Caldwell^{F2}	United Kingdom	2020–2021	0	39	38	0	1	4	1	111
Rafael Câmara^{F2}	Brazil	2025	1 (2025)	20	19	5	4	5	4	166
Giorgio Carrara	Switzerland (Note: Carrara is an Argentine driver who competed under a Swiss racing license.)	2019	0	8	8	0	0	0	0	0
Jesse Carrasquedo Jr.	Mexico	2025	0	4	4	0	0	0	0	0
Zdeněk Chovanec	Portugal (Note: Chovanec is a Czech-Venezuelan driver who competed under a Portuguese racing license.)	2021–2022	0	13	12	0	0	0	0	0
Pierre-Louis Chovet	France	2020–2021	0	10	10	0	0	0	0	5
**Pedro Clerot***	Brazil	2026	0	16	16	0	0	3	0	48
Ido Cohen	Israel	2021–2023	0	57	56	0	0	0	0	4
Franco Colapinto^{F2} ^{F1}	Argentina	2022–2023	0	36	36	1	4	10	0	186
Caio Collet	Brazil	2021–2023	0	57	56	1	3	11	3	254
**Mattia Colnaghi***	Argentina	2026	0	16	16	0	0	0	0	44
Lorenzo Colombo	Italy	2021	0	21	20	0	1	1	2	32
Amaury Cordeel^{F2}	Belgium	2021	0	21	20	0	0	0	0	0
Juan Manuel Correa^{F2}	United States	2021–2022	0	37	36	0	0	1	0	50
Jak Crawford^{F2}	United States	2021–2022	0	39	38	0	1	6	2	154
McKenzy Cresswell	United Kingdom	2023	0	4	4	0	0	0	0	0
Jehan Daruvala^{F2}	India	2019	0	16	16	1	2	7	2	157
Cameron Das	United States	2020	0	18	18	0	0	0	0	0
**Yevan David***	Sri Lanka	2026	0	16	16	0	0	1	0	34
Devlin DeFrancesco	Canada	2019	0	16	16	0	0	0	0	0
Reshad de Gerus	France	2021	0	12	12	0	0	0	1	0
**Matteo De Palo***	Italy	2026	0	16	16	0	0	0	1	7
**Bruno del Pino***	Spain	2025–2026	0	36	35	0	1	3	2	66
Alessio Deledda^{F2}	Italy	2019–2020	0	34	34	0	0	0	0	0
**Enzo Deligny***	France	2026	0	16	16	0	0	1	0	34
Ivan Domingues	Portugal	2025	0	20	19	0	1	1	1	18
Jack Doohan^{F2} ^{F1}	Australia	2020–2021	0	39	38	2	4	7	1	179
Felipe Drugovich^{F2}	Brazil	2019	0	16	16	0	0	0	0	8
Joshua Dufek	Austria	2023–2025	0	30	30	0	0	0	0	1
Alex Dunne^{F2}	Ireland	2024	0	20	20	0	0	2	0	50
Lukas Dunner	Austria	2020	0	18	18	0	0	0	0	0
Jonny Edgar	United Kingdom	2021–2023	0	53	52	0	1	1	2	124
**Ricardo Escotto***	Mexico	2026	0	8	8	0	0	0	0	0
Max Esterson^{F2}	United Kingdom	2023–2024	0	24	24	0	0	0	0	11
Andreas Estner	Germany	2019–2020	0	18	18	0	0	0	0	0
Alessandro Famularo	Italy	2022	0	2	2	0	0	0	0	0
Roberto Faria	Brazil	2023	0	18	18	0	0	0	0	0
Sebastián Fernández	Spain (Note: Fernandez is a Venezuelan driver who competed under a Spanish racing license.)	2019–2020	0	34	34	1	0	0	0	31
Max Fewtrell	United Kingdom	2019–2020	0	28	28	0	0	2	0	62
Enzo Fittipaldi^{F2}	Brazil	2020–2021	0	30	30	0	0	1	0	52
Sophia Flörsch	Germany	2020, 2023–2024	0	54	54	0	0	0	0	6
Leonardo Fornaroli^{F2}†	Italy	2023–2024	1 (2024)	38	38	3	0	10	2	222
Igor Fraga	Brazil	2020	0	16	16	0	0	0	0	1
Kaylen Frederick	United States	2021–2023	0	51	49	0	0	0	0	40
Alex García	Mexico	2023	0	18	18	0	0	0	0	12
**José Garfias***	Mexico	2025–2026	0	18	18	0	0	0	0	1
**Alessandro Giusti***	France	2025–2026	0	36	35	0	0	2	1	90
**Maciej Gładysz***	Poland	2026	0	16	16	0	1	1	0	54
Oliver Goethe^{F2}	Germany	2022–2024	0	40	40	1	2	5	3	184
Oliver Gray	United Kingdom	2023	0	18	18	0	0	0	0	0
Isack Hadjar^{F2} ^{F1}	France	2022	0	18	18	1	3	5	2	123
**Salim Hanna**	Colombia	2026	0	4	4	0	0	0	0	0
Dennis Hauger^{F2}†	Norway	2020–2021	1 (2021)	39	38	3	4	10	4	219
James Hedley	United Kingdom	2024–2025	0	16	14	0	0	0	0	7
**Patrick Heuzenroeder**	Australia	2026	0	2	2	0	0	0	0	0
**Christian Ho***	Singapore	2025–2026	0	36	35	0	0	0	0	19
Johnathan Hoggard	United Kingdom	2021	0	18	17	0	0	0	0	14
Jake Hughes^{F2}	United Kingdom	2019–2021	0	37	37	1	3	8	5	201.5
Raoul Hyman	United Kingdom (Note: Hyman is a South African driver who competed under a British racing license.)	2019	0	16	16	0	0	0	0	2
Tasanapol Inthraphuvasak^{F2}	Thailand	2024–2025	0	40	39	0	3	4	1	83
Ayumu Iwasa^{F2}	Japan	2021	0	21	20	0	1	2	0	52
Nikita Johnson	United States	2025	0	8	8	0	0	0	0	0
Niko Kari	Finland	2019, 2022	0	18	18	0	0	2	0	36
**Taito Kato***	Japan	2026	0	16	16	0	1	3	0	71
Simo Laaksonen	Finland	2019	0	16	16	0	0	0	0	2
**Nicola Lacorte***	Italy	2025–2026	0	34	33	0	1	1	0	33
Liam Lawson^{F2} ^{F1}	New Zealand	2019–2020	0	34	34	1	3	8	1	184
**Kanato Le***	Japan	2026	0	16	16	0	0	1	0	30
Arthur Leclerc^{F2}	Monaco	2021–2022	0	39	38	1	3	5	3	193
Noel León^{F2}	Mexico	2024–2025	0	40	39	0	0	5	2	115
Hon Chio Leong	Macau	2019	0	2	2	0	0	0	0	0
Arvid Lindblad^{F2}^{F1}	United Kingdom	2024	0	20	20	0	4	5	1	113
Joseph Loake	United Kingdom	2024	0	20	20	0	0	0	0	8
Christian Lundgaard^{F2}	Denmark	2019	0	16	16	2	1	2	2	97
Kush Maini^{F2}	India	2022	0	18	18	0	0	1	0	31
Zane Maloney^{F2}	Barbados	2022	0	18	18	2	3	4	3	134
Federico Malvestiti	Italy	2019–2020, 2022	0	36	36	0	0	0	0	0
Christian Mansell^{F2}	Australia	2022–2024	0	42	42	1	0	7	2	172
Nicola Marinangeli	Italy	2025	0	20	19	0	0	0	0	0
Pepe Martí^{F2}	Spain	2022–2023	0	36	36	2	3	4	3	107
Victor Martins^{F2}†	France	2021–2022	1 (2022)	39	38	0	3	12	5	270
**Fionn McLaughlin***	Ireland	2026	0	16	16	0	0	0	0	2
Sami Meguetounif^{F2}	France	2024	0	20	20	0	2	0	2	84
Gabriele Minì^{F2}	Italy	2023–2024	0	38	37	3	3	9	2	222
Sebastián Montoya^{F2}	Colombia	2022–2024	0	40	40	0	0	2	0	84
**Théophile Naël***	France	2025–2026	0	36	35	3	2	5	1	147
**Jin Nakamura***	Japan	2026	0	16	16	0	1	2	0	39
Matteo Nannini^{F2}	Italy	2020–2021	0	39	38	0	1	3	0	55
Teppei Natori	Japan	2019	0	16	16	0	0	0	0	1
Clément Novalak^{F2}	France	2020–2021	0	39	38	0	0	6	4	192
Zak O'Sullivan^{F2}	United Kingdom	2022–2023	0	36	36	2	4	7	2	173
Alex Peroni	Australia	2019–2020	0	32	31	0	0	3	2	69
Artem Petrov	Russia	2019	0	2	2	0	0	0	0	0
Oscar Piastri^{F2} ^{F1}†	Australia	2020	1 (2020)	18	18	0	2	6	4	164
Pedro Piquet^{F2}	Brazil	2019	0	16	16	0	1	3	1	98
Francesco Pizzi	Italy	2022	0	18	18	0	0	0	0	1
Théo Pourchaire^{F2}	France	2020	0	18	18	0	2	8	0	161
**Alex Powell***	United States	2026	0	2	2	0	0	0	0	0
Leonardo Pulcini	Italy	2019–2020	0	18	18	0	1	2	0	78
Santiago Ramos	Mexico	2024–2025	0	38	37	1	2	4	1	90
Oliver Rasmussen	Denmark	2021–2022	0	24	24	0	0	0	0	4
**Ernesto Rivera***	Mexico	2026	0	14	14	0	2	3	1	76
Javier Sagrera	Spain	2025	0	4	4	0	0	0	0	0
Logan Sargeant^{F2} ^{F1}	United States	2019–2021	0	55	54	3	3	10	2	267
Grégoire Saucy	Switzerland	2022–2023	0	36	36	0	0	3	1	84
Fabio Scherer	Switzerland	2019	0	16	16	0	0	0	0	7
David Schumacher	Germany	2019–2022	0	45	44	0	1	2	0	55
**Louis Sharp**	New Zealand	2025–2026	0	34	33	0	0	0	2	32
Cian Shields^{F2}	United Kingdom	2024	0	20	20	0	0	0	0	0
**Michael Shin***	South Korea	2023, 2026	0	22	22	0	0	0	0	0
Robert Shwartzman^{F2}†	Russia	2019	1 (2019)	16	16	2	3	10	2	212
Ayrton Simmons	United Kingdom	2021–2022	0	5	4	0	0	0	0	0
Francesco Simonazzi	Italy	2023	0	4	4	0	0	0	0	0
**Freddie Slater***	United Kingdom	2025–2026	0	18	17	3	1	9	1	151
Tommy Smith	Australia	2023–2024	0	38	38	0	0	0	0	12
Aleksandr Smolyar	Russia	2020–2022	0	55	54	3	3	8	3	242
Roman Staněk^{F2}	Czech Republic	2020–2022	0	57	56	1	1	6	2	149
Martinius Stenshorne^{F2}	Norway	2024–2025	0	38	37	0	3	6	4	127
**Noah Strømsted***	Denmark	2024–2026	0	38	37	0	2	4	3	149
Kacper Sztuka	Poland	2024	0	20	20	0	0	0	0	6
**Tuukka Taponen***	Finland	2024–2026	0	38	37	1	0	4	2	131
László Tóth	Hungary	2021–2022	0	36	35	0	0	0	0	0
Tim Tramnitz	Germany	2024–2025	0	40	39	0	2	7	0	175
Enzo Trulli	Italy	2022	0	18	18	0	0	0	0	0
Nikola Tsolov^{F2}	Bulgaria	2023–2025	0	56	55	2	5	9	2	205
Yuki Tsunoda^{F2} ^{F1}	Japan	2019	0	16	16	0	1	3	1	67
**Ugo Ugochukwu***	United States	2025–2026	0	36	35	0	2	8	3	169
Filip Ugran	Romania	2021–2022	0	23	22	0	0	0	0	0
Reece Ushijima	United Kingdom	2022	0	18	18	0	0	1	0	13
Tijmen van der Helm	Netherlands	2021	0	21	20	0	0	0	0	0
Laurens van Hoepen^{F2}	Netherlands	2024–2025	0	40	39	1	0	5	3	118
Richard Verschoor^{F2}	Netherlands	2019–2020	0	34	34	0	0	1	1	103
Frederik Vesti^{F2}	Denmark	2020–2021	0	39	38	2	4	9	3	284.5
David Vidales	Spain	2022	0	18	17	0	1	1	0	29
Rafael Villagómez^{F2}	Mexico	2021–2023	0	57	56	0	0	0	0	4
Jüri Vips^{F2}	Estonia	2019	0	16	16	1	3	4	1	141
Bent Viscaal^{F2}	Netherlands	2019–2020	0	34	34	0	1	2	1	50
Callum Voisin	United Kingdom	2024–2025	0	40	39	1	1	3	1	119
**James Wharton***^{F2}	Australia	2024–2026	0	38	36	0	2	2	3	54
Calan Williams^{F2}	Australia	2020–2021	0	39	38	0	0	1	0	15
Piotr Wiśnicki	Poland	2023–2024	0	28	28	0	0	0	0	10
Charlie Wurz	Austria	2024–2025	0	40	39	0	0	2	0	63
**Gerrard Xie***	China	2025–2026	0	36	35	0	1	2	0	21
**Hiyu Yamakoshi***	Japan	2026	0	16	16	1	0	3	1	71
Hunter Yeany	United States	2021–2023	0	28	27	0	0	0	0	0
Yifei Ye	China	2019	0	16	16	0	0	0	0	4
Matías Zagazeta	Peru	2024–2025	0	38	37	0	0	1	0	21
Lirim Zendeli^{F2}	Germany	2019–2020, 2022	0	36	34	2	1	3	1	110

== By racing license ==
License	Total drivers	Champions	Championships	Current	First driver(s)	Most recent driver(s)/ current driver(s)
Argentina	2	0	0	1	Franco Colapinto (2022 Sakhir Formula 3 round)	Mattia Colnaghi (2026 Monza Formula 3 round)
Australia	9	1 (Piastri)	1 (2020)	1	Alex Peroni (2019 Barcelona FIA Formula 3 round)	James Wharton (2026 Monza Formula 3 round)
Austria	3	0	0	0	Lukas Dunner (2020 Spielberg Formula 3 round)	Charlie Wurz (2025 Monza Formula 3 round)
Barbados	1	0	0	0	Zane Maloney (2022 Sakhir Formula 3 round)	Zane Maloney (2022 Monza Formula 3 round)
Belgium	1	0	0	0	Amaury Cordeel (2021 Barcelona Formula 3 round)	Amaury Cordeel (2021 Sochi Formula 3 round)
Brazil	10	2 (Bortoleto, Câmara)	2 (2023, 2025)	2	Felipe Drugovich, Pedro Piquet (2019 Barcelona Formula 3 round)	Fernando Barrichello, Pedro Clerot (2026 Monza Formula 3 round)
Bulgaria	1	0	0	0	Nikola Tsolov (2023 Sakhir Formula 3 round)	Nikola Tsolov (2025 Monza Formula 3 round)
Canada	1	0	0	0	Devlin DeFrancesco (2019 Barcelona Formula 3 round)	Devlin DeFrancesco (2019 Sochi Formula 3 round)
China	2	0	0	1	Yifei Ye (2019 Barcelona Formula 3 round)	Gerrard Xie (2026 Monza Formula 3 round)
Colombia	2	0	0	0	Sebastián Montoya (2022 Zandvoort Formula 3 round)	Salim Hanna (2026 Budapest Formula 3 round)
Czech Republic	1	0	0	0	Roman Staněk (2020 Spielberg Formula 3 round)	Roman Staněk (2022 Monza Formula 3 round)
Denmark	4	0	0	1	Christian Lundgaard (2019 Barcelona Formula 3 round)	Noah Strømsted (2026 Budapest Formula 3 round)
Estonia	2	0	0	0	Jüri Vips (2019 Barcelona Formula 3 round)	Paul Aron (2023 Monza Formula 3 round)
Finland	4	0	0	1	Niko Kari, Simo Laaksonen (2019 Barcelona Formula 3 round)	Tuukka Taponen (2026 Monza Formula 3 round)
France	10	1 (Martins)	1 (2022)	3	Théo Pourchaire (2020 Spielberg Formula 3 round)	Enzo Deligny, Alessandro Giusti, Théophile Naël (2026 Monza Formula 3 round)
Germany	7	0	0	0	David Beckmann, Andreas Estner, Lirim Zendeli (2019 Barcelona Formula 3 round)	Tim Tramnitz (2025 Monza Formula 3 round)
Hungary	1	0	0	0	László Tóth (2021 Barcelona Formula 3 round)	László Tóth (2022 Monza Formula 3 round)
India	2	0	0	0	Jehan Daruvala (2019 Barcelona Formula 3 round)	Kush Maini (2022 Monza Formula 3 round)
Iran	1	0	0	0	Keyvan Andres (2019 Barcelona Formula 3 round)	Keyvan Andres (2019 Sochi Formula 3 round)
Ireland	2	0	0	1	Alex Dunne (2024 Sakhir Formula 3 round)	Fionn McLaughlin (2026 Monza Formula 3 round)
Israel	1	0	0	0	Ido Cohen (2021 Barcelona Formula 3 round)	Ido Cohen (2023 Monza Formula 3 round)
Italy	16	1 (Fornaroli)	1 (2024)	3	Alessio Deledda, Leonardo Pulcini (2019 Barcelona Formula 3 round)	Brando Badoer, Nicola Lacorte, Matteo De Palo (2026 Monza Formula 3 round)
Japan	7	0	0	4	Teppei Natori, Yuki Tsunoda (2019 Barcelona Formula 3 round)	Taito Kato, Kanato Le, Jin Nakamura, Hiyu Yamakoshi (2026 Monza Formula 3 round)
Macau	1	0	0	0	Hon Chio Leong (2019 Sochi Formula 3 round)	Hon Chio Leong (2019 Sochi Formula 3 round)
Malaysia	1	0	0	0	Nazim Azman (2022 Sakhir Formula 3 round)	Nazim Azman (2022 Monza Formula 3 round)
Mexico	8	0	0	3	Rafael Villagómez (2021 Barcelona Formula 3 round)	Ricardo Escotto, José Garfias, Ernesto Rivera (2026 Monza Formula 3 round)
Monaco	1	0	0	0	Arthur Leclerc (2021 Barcelona Formula 3 round)	Arthur Leclerc (2022 Monza Formula 3 round)
Netherlands	4	0	0	0	Richard Verschoor, Bent Viscaal (2019 Barcelona Formula 3 round)	Laurens van Hoepen (2025 Monza Formula 3 round)
New Zealand	3	0	0	0	Marcus Armstrong, Liam Lawson (2019 Barcelona Formula 3 round)	Louis Sharp (2026 Budapest Formula 3 round)
Norway	2	1 (Hauger)	1 (2021)	0	Dennis Hauger (2020 Spielberg Formula 3 round)	Martinius Stenshorne (2025 Monza Formula 3 round)
Peru	1	0	0	0	Matías Zagazeta (2024 Sakhir Formula 3 round)	Matías Zagazeta (2025 Monza Formula 3 round)
Poland	4	0	0	1	Piotr Wiśnicki (2023 Sakhir Formula 3 round)	Maciej Gładysz (2026 Monza Formula 3 round)
Portugal	2	0	0	0	Zdeněk Chovanec (2021 Spa-Francorchamps Formula 3 round)	Ivan Domingues (2025 Monza Formula 3 round)
Romania	1	0	0	0	Filip Ugran (2021 Barcelona Formula 3 round)	Filip Ugran (2022 Silverstone Formula 3 round)
Russia	4	1 (Shwartzman)	1 (2019)	0	Artem Petrov, Robert Shwartzman (2019 Barcelona Formula 3 round)	Aleksandr Smolyar (2022 Monza Formula 3 round)
Singapore	1	0	0	1	Christian Ho (2025 Melbourne Formula 3 round)	Christian Ho (2026 Monza Formula 3 round)
South Korea	1	0	0	1	Michael Shin (2023 Budapest Formula 3 round)	Michael Shin (2026 Monza Formula 3 round)
Spain	6	0	0	1	Sebastián Fernández (2019 Barcelona Formula 3 round)	Bruno del Pino (2026 Monza Formula 3 round)
Sri Lanka	1	0	0	1	Yevan David (2026 Melbourne Formula 3 round)	Yevan David (2026 Monza Formula 3 round)
Sweden	1	0	0	0	Dino Beganovic (2023 Sakhir Formula 3 round)	Dino Beganovic (2024 Monza Formula 3 round)
Switzerland	4	0	0	0	Fabio Scherer (2019 Barcelona Formula 3 round)	Joshua Dufek, Grégoire Saucy (2023 Monza Formula 3 round)
Thailand	2	0	0	1	Tasanapol Inthraphuvasak (2024 Sakhir Formula 3 round)	Nandhavud Bhirombhakdi (2026 Monza Formula 3 round)
United Kingdom	23	0	0	1	Max Fewtrell, Raoul Hyman, Jake Hughes (2019 Barcelona Formula 3 round)	Freddie Slater (2026 Monza Formula 3 round)
United States	10	0	0	2	Logan Sargeant (2019 Barcelona Formula 3 round)	Alex Powell, Ugo Ugochukwu (2026 Monza Formula 3 round)

== See also ==
- List of FIA Formula 3 Championship race winners
