= FIA Formula 3 Championship =

Single-Seater Racing Championship

- Category: One-make open-wheel single-seater Formula auto racing
- Country: International
- Inaugural season: 2019
- Chassis suppliers: Dallara
- Engine suppliers: Mecachrome
- Tyre suppliers: Pirelli
- Drivers' champion: (United States) Ugo Ugochukwu
- Teams' champion: (Spain) Campos Racing
- Official website: fiaformula3.com

The FIA Formula 3 Championship (FIA F3) is a third-tier international single-seater racing championship organised by the Fédération Internationale de l'Automobile (FIA). The championship launched in 2019 as a feeder series for the FIA Formula 1 World Championship and FIA Formula 2 Championships. It was the result of a merger between two third-tier single-seater racing championships, the GP3 Series and the FIA Formula 3 European Championship. This championship is part of the FIA Global Pathway consolidation project plan. Unlike its co-predecessor, the Formula 3 European Championship, the series runs exclusively in support of Formula One races.

== Origins and history ==
On 13 March 2017 it was announced that the GP3 Series would merge with the FIA and DMSB's FIA Formula 3 European Championship and as such, both bodies would merge their both third-tier open-wheel single seater formula racing series, the GP3 Series and FIA Formula 3 European Championship respectively, with plans to début in 2019. On 1 September 2017 the merger committee announced that World Motor Sport Council were selected to develop the name, logo and identity of the new series. The reveal date for the new series was 10 March 2018 at the FIA headquarters at Paris, France. GP3 Series CEO Bruno Michel announced the new sanctioning body would be sanctioned by FIA from 2019 season and thus become Formula One's sole support Grand Prix weekends mostly in Europe. FIA President Jean Todt then announced the new FIA Formula 3 Championship title and logo later in October 2018.

== Race weekend ==
Pit stops are optional if there is a major event like a change in weather conditions, tyre puncture, front or rear wing damage or others.

On Friday, there is one Free Practice session of 45 minutes and one Qualifying session of 30 minutes.

On Saturday, one Sprint Race will take place and will consist of 40 minutes + one lap. The starting grid will be determined by reversing the top 12 finishers of Friday's Qualifying session.

On Sunday, the Feature Race will take place ahead of the Formula 1 Grand Prix and will consist of 45 minutes + one lap.

=== Points system ===
The top 10 finishers in the Sprint Race receive points as follows:

Point system for Sprint Race
1st	2nd	3rd	4th	5th	6th	7th	8th	9th	10th
10	9	8	7	6	5	4	3	2	1

The top 10 finishers in the Feature Race receive points as follows:

Point system for Feature Race
1st	2nd	3rd	4th	5th	6th	7th	8th	9th	10th
25	18	15	12	10	8	6	4	2	1

The driver who qualified in pole position for the Feature race during Friday's qualifying session receives an additional 2 points.

In each race, one point will be awarded to the driver who achieves the fastest lap time, provided the driver was in the top 10 positions of the final race classification.

The maximum number of points a driver can score at any round will be 39.

A count-back system is used to decide places of drivers with equal points in the championship with the driver with most wins ranking highest of those with equal points totals. If there is still a tie, the most second-place finishes, then the most third-place finishes, etc., is used to split the tied drivers. This count-back system is applied at all stages of the championship.

== Car ==
The FIA Formula 3 Championship car is used by all of the teams, and features a Dallara carbon-fiber monocoque chassis powered by a Mecachrome naturally-aspirated direct-injected V6 engine and Pirelli dry slick and rain treaded tyres.

=== Chassis ===
==== First-generation (fourth-generation overall — 2019–2024) ====
The F3 Championship will use the 2019 specification F3 2019 car which has been designed by Dallara Automobili. The new FIA Formula 3 Championship chassis material is Carbon/aluminium honeycomb structure and also Carbon Aramid honeycomb bodywork structure. The new FIA Formula 3 Championship car's front wings are slightly wider and also wider-lower rear wing.

=== Engine ===
==== First generation (second-generation overall — 2016–present) ====
The series will remain using the 3.4-litre V6 naturally-aspirated direct-injected engines supplied by Mecachrome until at least the 2024 season due to FIA Formula 3 Championship not being interested in a turbocharged engine. The horsepower would be scaled down from 400 to 380 hp (298 to 283 kW).

Mecachrome V634 F3 V6 engines were crated and shipped to all FIA Formula 3 Championship teams on a serial-number basis as determined by the FIA to ensure equality and fairness in distribution and sells for up to over €60,000 per unit by leasing and rebuilding.

==== Fuel and lubricants components ====
All Formula 3 cars currently use ordinary unleaded racing gasoline as fuel (similar to commercial vehicle unleaded street gasoline), which has been the de facto standard in third tier single-seater formula racing since the introduction of GP3 Series in 2010. Since 2019, Elf has continued to be the exclusive provider of the LMS 102 RON unleaded fuel and also Elf HTX 840 0W-40 lubricants for all FIA Formula 3 Championship cars until 2022.

In 2023, Aramco became the official fuel and lubricant partner and supplier of all FIA Formula 3 Championship entrants.

=== Transmission, gearbox and clutches ===
The current gearbox has been manufactured by Hewland and features an 8-position barrel with ratchet body and software upgrades as well as a new transverse shafts fixing system designed to facilitate improved gear selection. Currently, the FIA Formula 3 Championship gearbox uses a 6-speed sequential gearbox configuration with electro-hydraulic control via paddle-shifters, with reverse operated by a reverse button on the steering wheel. The clutches of all FIA Formula 3 Championship cars are supplied by AP Racing with the multi-plate clutch operated by a hand-paddle lever.

=== Wheels and tyres ===
O.Z. Racing exclusively supply wheel rims for all FIA Formula 3 Championship cars.

Pirelli will continue supplying tyres for all FIA Formula 3 Championship cars as they have done since the GP3 Series era. The tyre size of all cars will still remain the same as in the GP3 Series. The tyre sizes are 250/575-R13 on the fronts and 290/590-R13 on the rears. The compounds of Pirelli Formula 3 tyres are currently three dry compounds (red soft, yellow medium and white hard) carrying the "P Zero" brand and one wet compound (blue wet) carrying the "Cinturato" brand.

=== Brakes ===
Brembo supplies monobloc brake calipers and disc bells, which are exclusive to the FIA Formula 3 Championship. Carbone Industrie also supplies carbon brake discs and pads for the championship.

=== Suspension ===
The suspension of all FIA Formula 3 Championship cars is upper and lower steel wishbones, pushrod operated, coupled with twin Koni dampers and torsion bars suspension (front) and spring suspension (rear) similar to current Formula One car suspension.

=== Steering wheel ===
From the 2019 season, all FIA Formula 3 Championship cars will utilize the all-new XAP Single-seat Formula 2451 S3 steering wheel with a larger dash screen and also three new rotary switches (similar to the current FIA Formula E and FIA Formula 2 steering wheel).

=== Safety ===
The current safety innovation of FIA Formula 3 Championship is the top priority. Front, side, rear and steering column impact tests are the FIA safety standards. All of the FIA Formula 3 Championship cars include front and rear roll hoop, impact structures and monocoque push tests. Anti-intrusion survival cell protection panels are also featured since 2019. Wheel retainer safety cables are also featured to avoid wheel flying similar to Formula One, IndyCar Series (known as SWEMS) and other single-seater Formula racing series. The seat belts of all FIA Formula 3 Championship cars are supplied by Sabelt with 6-point seat belt configuration similar to Formula One. From 2019 onwards the “halo” cockpit protection system was added.

=== Other components ===
All FIA Formula 3 cars carry a Magneti Marelli-provided electronic control unit as well as Magneti Marelli power supply management unit. Live telemetry is used only for television broadcasts, but the data can be recorded from the ECU to the computer if the car is in the garage and not on the track.

Rear view mirrors for all FIA Formula 3 cars are mandated for easy viewing of opponents behind.

=== Aerodynamics ===
The aerodynamics of current FIA Formula 3 Championship cars are resembling the Formula One 2017-style aerodynamic with wider and curved front wing and also lower rear wing with parallelogram rear wing plate. Side winglets are also banned. The undertrays of all FIA Formula 3 Championship cars are grounds-effect underbody as opposed to flat-bottom underbody that usually utilized in Formula One.

==== Drag Reduction Systems (DRS) ====
Since 2017 GP3 Series season, the Drag Reduction Systems (DRS) were introduced in a purpose for overtaking maneuver assist by tilting the upper-element rear wing while approaching the opponent less than a second away by activating the DRS paddle behind the steering wheel. The upper-element rear wing angle of FIA Formula 3 car rear wing is the same angle as Formula One car which has over 40 degrees of angle. In an event of rainy conditions, Drag Reduction Systems are automatically deactivated for safety reasons.

=== Other parts ===
The car also features internal cooling upgrades, a new water radiator, radiator duct, oil/water heat exchanger, modified oil degasser, new oil and water pipes and new heat exchanger fixing brackets.

=== Specifications ===
==== 2019—2024 ====
- Engine displacement: 3.4 L (207 cu in) DOHC V6
- Gearbox: 6-speed paddle shift sequential semi-automatic gearbox (must have reverse)
- Weight: 1,484 lb (673 kg) including driver and fuel
- Power output: 380 hp (283 kW)
- Fuel: Elf LMS 102 RON unleaded (2019–2022) later Aramco Advanced 55% sustainable fuels (2023–2024)
- Fuel capacity: 65 litres (17 US gallons)
- Fuel delivery: Direct fuel injection
- Aspiration: Naturally-aspirated
- Length: 4,965 mm (195 in)
- Width: 1,885 mm (74 in)
- Wheelbase: 2,880 mm (113 in)
- Steering: Manual, rack and pinion (no power steering)
- Tyres: Pirelli P Zero slick dry and Pirelli Cinturato treaded wet

== Performance ==
Formula 3 cars have a top speed around 300 km/h, and can accelerate from 0–100 km/h in 3 seconds. These straight-line acceleration figures are similar to high-end road-going sports cars. However, their cornering and braking capabilities far exceed road cars, with peak lateral acceleration of 2.6 g and peak deceleration of 1.9 g.

Consequently, while Formula 3 cars lap considerably slower than Formula One and Formula 2, they are still much faster than most categories based on road cars. As a point of comparison, the fastest lap for the 2023 Melbourne Formula 3 round was 1:34.405, roughly 14 seconds per lap slower than the fastest lap of 1:20.235 in the 2023 Australian Grand Prix. The premier domestic touring car racing category in Australia, Supercars, also held support races; the fastest qualifying time (likely faster than the fastest race lap) was 1:49.317, 15 seconds slower.

== Costs ==
While intended as a comparatively low cost development series, the absolute costs of competing in the championship are well beyond the personal financial means of most individuals.

One estimate puts the cost of competing in the FIA Formula 3 championship at approximately US$1.2 million per season. This is approximately half the cost of competing in the F2 championship. Typically, most of these costs must be paid by the driver, through personal sponsorship, or personal or family wealth.

A number of cost control measures were introduced by the FIA for the 2021 season.

== Seasons ==
=== 2019 ===
The inaugural season of the FIA Formula 3 Championship consisted of 16 races held across eight rounds at European circuits, beginning on 11 May at the Circuit de Barcelona-Catalunya and ending on 29 September at the Sochi Autodrom. 2019 marked the debut of the new Dallara F3 2019 chassis, powered by a naturally-aspirated 3.4L V6 engine developed by Mecachrome, the same engine used in the car's GP3 Series predecessor the Dallara GP3/16. This also marked the debut of the halo safety device, bodywork that had been introduced in Formula 1 and Formula 2 in 2018.

Prema Racing won the teams' championship, scoring over twice as many points as runners-up Hitech Grand Prix and extending their streak to seven consecutive teams' championships from the predecessor FIA Formula 3 European Championship. The three Prema Racing drivers finished in the top three positions in the drivers' championship. Robert Shwartzman finished the season as champion, having finished third in the predecessor series the year prior. He took three race wins and secured the championship with one race remaining. Marcus Armstrong finished as runner-up with Jehan Daruvala in third.

=== 2020 ===
The 2020 championship was due to begin at the Bahrain International Circuit on 21 March, with Circuit Paul Ricard being dropped from the calendar in favour of Circuit Zandvoort. However, the first three rounds of the championship were postponed in response to the COVID-19 pandemic. A revised calendar was published in June, consisting of 18 races across nine rounds held alongside the first nine races of the Formula One World Championship. The season began at the Red Bull Ring on 4 July and concluded at the Mugello Circuit on 13 September.

Prema Racing secured their eighth consecutive teams' championship with three races to go. Prema Racing driver and series debutant Oscar Piastri ended the season as champion, securing the title at the final race having claimed two race victories. He finished three points ahead of ART Grand Prix driver Théo Pourchaire, with Prema Racing's Logan Sargeant one point further behind in third place.

=== 2021 ===
As a cost-cutting measure, the 2021 championship calendar was reduced to seven rounds with each round consisting of three races, featuring twenty-one races in total, in line with changes made to the 2021 FIA Formula 2 Championship. The rounds at Silverstone Circuit, Autodromo Nazionale di Monza and Mugello Circuit were dropped from the calendar, and the rounds at Circuit Paul Ricard and Circuit Zandvoort returned, having been cancelled in 2020. The championship began on 8 May at the Circuit de Barcelona-Catalunya. The season was initially intended to conclude on 24 October at the Circuit of the Americas, however this was cancelled and replaced with a round at the Sochi Autodrom, ending on 26 September.

The Drivers' Championship was won by Prema Racing's Dennis Hauger in his second year in the series; he took four race victories and claimed the title with two races remaining. Trident drivers Jack Doohan and Clément Novalak finished second and third respectively. Trident ended Prema Racing's streak of Teams' Championship victories, claiming the title at the final race by a margin of four points.

=== 2022 ===
The series took returned to its pre-2021 race format with two races per round, (Note: The two-race format was altered; the sprint race now took place before the feature race with its starting grid based on the reversal of the top twelve in qualifying.) and featured nine rounds. The rounds at Silverstone and Monza returned to the calendar, whilst the rounds at Circuit Paul Ricard and Sochi were removed. The calendar featured two new venues, with Bahrain and Imola Circuit hosting races for the first time. The scoring format was also changed, reducing the number of points on offer for sprint races, fastest laps and pole positions. The series' first team change took place in 2022; HWA Racelab left the championship and was replaced by Van Amersfoort Racing. The championship began in Bahrain on 19 March and concluded at Monza on 11 September.

ART Grand Prix driver Victor Martins, who finished fifth the previous year, took two race victories on his way to winning the Drivers' Championship. He clinched the title at the final race, prior to which there were six drivers mathematically in title contention. Runner-up was Trident's Zane Maloney followed by Prema Racing driver Oliver Bearman. Prema Racing reclaimed the Teams' Championship ahead of second-placed Trident.

=== 2023 ===
For 2023, Circuit Zandvoort was removed from the calendar and two new rounds were added; the category returned to the Circuit de Monaco for the first time since 2005 and made its debut at the Albert Park Circuit supporting the Australian Grand Prix. The championship was thus set to feature ten rounds, however the round at Imola Circuit was cancelled along with the Emilia Romagna Grand Prix after severe flooding in the area. Two teams changed ownership for 2023. New Zealand-based car manufacturer Rodin Cars became the majority shareholder in Carlin and the team was renamed Rodin Carlin. Charouz Racing System sold their operation to PHM Racing whilst continuing to support the entry under the name PHM Racing by Charouz. The season began in Bahrain on 4 March and concluded at Monza on 3 September.

Trident driver and FIA Formula 3 rookie Gabriel Bortoleto sealed the Drivers' Championship with two races remaining, becoming the first South American and consequently Brazilian driver to win the title and first to win with Trident. Prema Racing drivers Zak O'Sullivan and Paul Aron were second and third respectively. Prema Racing secured their fourth Teams' Championship in the category at the final race, ahead of Trident.

=== 2024 ===
Imola Circuit returned to the schedule after its cancellation in 2023, bringing the calendar back to ten rounds. The season began in Bahrain on 1 March and concluded at Monza on 1 September. Rodin Cars completed their takeover of Carlin and the team became Rodin Motorsport. PHM Racing now operated independently of Charouz Racing System, but the team was acquired by Dubai-based finance firm AIX Investment Group early in the season and was rebranded to AIX Racing.

Trident's Leonardo Fornaroli won the Drivers' Championship; he clinched the title at the final race and won without taking any race victories over the season. Prema Racing driver Gabriele Minì finished second and Hitech Pulse-Eight's Luke Browning was third. Prema Racing secured the Teams' Championship at the penultimate round, taking their fifth title in the category, with Trident in second place.

=== 2025 ===
The 2025 season began in Australia on 15 March and concluded at Monza on 7 September. Jenzer Motorsport, which had raced in the championship since its inception and had competed in the predecessor GP3 Series since 2010, left the series to focus on its Formula 4 operations. Their place was taken by DAMS, which competes in Formula 2 but had not raced at Formula 3 level since 2017.

Trident won their third consecutive Drivers' Championship in the series with Rafael Câmara, who clinched the title at the penultimate round at Hungary, taking four wins and five poles throughout the season. Nikola Tsolov, Mari Boya and Tasanapol Inthraphuvasak finished second, third and seventh for Campos Racing respectively, allowing them to win the Team's Championship at the final round over Trident, their first in the category.

=== 2026 ===
The 2026 season began in Australia on 7 March and concluded at the new Madring track on 13 September. Due to the fallout of the 2026 Iran war, the round that was set to be held at Bahrain was cancelled and replaced with a second feature race and qualifying session at the Madring. Ahead of running, the new circuit hosted two Formula 3 test days, the first of which was marred by nineteen red flag periods.

== Champions ==
=== Drivers ===
Season	Driver	Team	Poles	Wins	Podiums	Fastest laps	Points	% points achievable	Clinched	Margin	Ref
2019	(Russia) Robert Shwartzman	(Italy) Prema Racing	2	3	10	2	212	55.208	2019 Sochi Feature Race	54	
2020	(Australia) Oscar Piastri	(Italy) Prema Racing	0	2	6	3	164	39.188	2020 Mugello Sprint Race	3	
2021	(Norway) Dennis Hauger	(Italy) Prema Racing	3	4	9	5	205	46.804	2021 Sochi Sprint Race 1	26	
2022	(France) Victor Martins	(France) ART Grand Prix	0	2	6	1	139	39.601	2022 Monza Feature Race	5	
2023	(Brazil) Gabriel Bortoleto	(Italy) Trident	1	2	6	3	164	46.724	2023 Monza Sprint Race (Note: Gabriel Bortoleto mathematically clinched the championship in qualifying for the final round, after 16 races had been completed.)	45	
2024	(Italy) Leonardo Fornaroli	(Italy) Trident	2	0	7	2	153	39.231	2024 Monza Feature Race	23	
2025	(Brazil) Rafael Câmara	(Italy) Trident	5	4	5	4	166	46.369	2025 Hungaroring Feature Race	42	
2026	(United States) Ugo Ugochukwu	(Spain) Campos Racing	0	2	7	3	159	42.627	2026 Madring Feature Race	14	

=== Teams ===
Season	Team	Poles	Wins	Podiums	Fastest laps	Points	% points achievable	Clinched	Margin	Ref
2019	(Italy) Prema Racing	4	8	24	7	527	63.956	2019 Spa-Francorchamps Sprint Race	304	
2020	(Italy) Prema Racing (2)	4	7	16	7	470.5	52.453	2020 Monza Feature Race	209	
2021	(Italy) Trident	2	5	13	3	381	39.895	2021 Sochi Feature Race	4	
2022	(Italy) Prema Racing (3)	0	3	15	4	355	44.320	2022 Monza Sprint Race	54	
2023	(Italy) Prema Racing (4)	1	5	13	6	327	40.824	2023 Monza Sprint Race	19	
2024	(Italy) Prema Racing (5)	2	7	14	5	352	39.551	2024 Spa-Francorchamps Feature Race	71	
2025	(Spain) Campos Racing	3	6	14	2	314	38.386	2025 Monza Feature Race	11	
2026	(Spain) Campos Racing (2)	3	7	15	6	334	39.480	2026 Madring Feature Race	117	

== Drivers who graduated to Formula One ==
- **Bold** denotes an active Formula One driver.

Driver	Formula 3					Formula 1					
Driver	Seasons	Races	Wins	Podiums	Best pos.	Seasons	First team	Races	Wins	Podiums	Points
(Japan) **Yuki Tsunoda**	2019	16	1	3	9th	2021–2026	AlphaTauri	114	0	0	125
(Australia) **Oscar Piastri**	2020	18	2	6	**1st**	2023–2026	McLaren	89	9	29	966
(United States) Logan Sargeant	2019–2021	54	3	10	**3rd**	2023–2024	Williams	36	0	0	1
(New Zealand) **Liam Lawson**	2019–2020	34	3	8	5th	2023–2026	AlphaTauri	56	0	0	133
(United Kingdom) **Oliver Bearman**	2022	18	1	8	**3rd**	2024–2026	Ferrari	48	0	0	71
**(Argentina) Franco Colapinto**	2022–2023	36	4	10	4th	2024–2026	Williams	47	0	0	40
(Australia) Jack Doohan	2020–2021	38	4	7	**2nd**	2024–2025	Alpine	7	0	0	0
(Brazil) **Gabriel Bortoleto**	2023	18	2	6	**1st**	2025–2026	Sauber	44	0	0	33
(France) **Isack Hadjar**	2022	18	3	5	4th	2025–2026	Racing Bulls	41	0	4	173
(United Kingdom) **Arvid Lindblad**	2024	20	4	5	4th	2026	Racing Bulls	20	0	0	38

== Circuits ==
- **Bold** denotes a circuit is used in 2026 FIA Formula 3 season.
- **Italic** a circuit will be used in 2027 FIA Formula 3 season.

Number	Circuits	Rounds	Years
1	(Austria) **Red Bull Ring**	9 (Note: Red Bull Ring hosted 2 rounds in 2020.)	2019–present
2	(Spain) **Circuit de Barcelona-Catalunya**	8	2019–2026
2	(United Kingdom) **Silverstone Circuit**	8 (Note: Silverstone Circuit hosted 2 rounds in 2020.)	2019–2020, 2022–present
2	(Hungary) **Hungaroring**	8	2019–2026
2	(Belgium) **Circuit de Spa-Francorchamps**	8	2019–2026
6	(Italy) **Monza Circuit**	7	2019–2020, 2022–present
7	**Bahrain International Circuit**	4	2022–2025, 2027
7	(Australia) **Albert Park Circuit**	4	2023–present
7	**Circuit de Monaco**	4	2023–present
10	(Italy) Imola Circuit	3	2022, 2024–2025
11	(France) Circuit Paul Ricard	2	2019, 2021
11	(Russia) Sochi Autodrom	2	2019, 2021
11	(Netherlands) Circuit Zandvoort	2	2021–2022
14	(Italy) Mugello Circuit	1	2020
14	(Spain) **Madring**	1	2026
16	(Saudi Arabia) **Jeddah Corniche Circuit**	0	2027
16	(Canada) **Circuit Gilles Villeneuve**	0	2027
16	(Turkey) **Istanbul Park**	0	2027

== See also ==
- List of FIA Formula 3 Championship drivers
- List of FIA Formula 3 Championship race winners
- Formula Three
- Formula One
- Formula Two
