= List of FIA Formula 3 Championship race winners =

FIA Formula 3 Championship, is the support series of the FIA Formula One World Championship. The FIA Formula 3 Championship season consists of a series of races, divided to Feature (long distance) and Sprint (short races). Each winner is presented with a trophy and the results of each race are combined to determine two annual Championships, one for drivers and one for teams.

The first Formula 3 race winner was Robert Shwartzman in the 2019 Barcelona Feature race, and the most recent driver to score his first Formula 3 race win was Tuukka Taponen in the 2026 Madrid Feature Race 2.

== Drivers' total wins ==
#	Driver	Seasons	Races	Wins	First win	Last win
1	(Bulgaria) Nikola Tsolov	2023–2025	56	5	2024 Monte Carlo Sprint Race	2025 Monte Carlo Feature Race
2	(Denmark) Frederik Vesti	2020–2021	38	4	2020 2nd Spielberg Feature Race	2021 Spielberg Feature Race
2	(United Kingdom) Arvid Lindblad	2024	20	4	2024 Sakhir Sprint Race	2024 Silverstone Feature Race
2	(Norway) Dennis Hauger	2020–2021	38	4	2021 Barcelona Feature Race	2021 Zandvoort Feature Race
2	(Australia) Jack Doohan	2020–2021	38	4	2021 Le Castellet Feature Race	2021 Sochi Feature Race
2	(Argentina) Franco Colapinto	2022–2023	34	4	2022 Imola Sprint Race	2023 Monza Sprint Race
2	(United Kingdom) Zak O'Sullivan	2022–2023	32	4	2023 Melbourne Sprint Race	2023 Budapest Feature Race
2	(Brazil) Rafael Câmara	2025	20	4	2025 Melbourne Feature Race	2025 Budapest Feature Race
9	(Russia) Robert Shwartzman	2019	16	3	2019 Barcelona Feature Race	2019 Monza Feature Race
9	(New Zealand) Marcus Armstrong	2019	16	3	2019 Budapest Sprint Race	2019 Sochi Feature Race
9	(Estonia) Jüri Vips	2019	16	3	2019 Spielberg Feature Race	2019 Sochi Sprint Race
9	(France) Isack Hadjar	2022	18	3	2022 Sakhir Sprint Race	2022 Spielberg Feature Race
9	(Barbados) Zane Maloney	2022	18	3	2022 Spa-Francorchamps Feature Race	2022 Monza Feature Race
9	(United Kingdom) Jake Hughes	2019–2020	34	3	2019 Spielberg Sprint Race	2020 Monza Sprint Race
9	(New Zealand) Liam Lawson	2019–2020	34	3	2020 Spielberg Sprint Race	2020 Mugello Sprint Race
9	(United States) Logan Sargeant	2019–2021	54	3	2020 2nd Silverstone Feature Race	2021 Sochi Sprint Race
9	(Russia) Alexander Smolyar	2020–2022	54	3	2021 Barcelona Sprint Race 1	2022 Budapest Feature Race
9	(Spain) Josep María Martí	2022–2023	32	3	2023 Sakhir Sprint Race	2023 Monte Carlo Sprint Race
9	(France) Victor Martins	2021–2022	41	3	2021 Zandvoort Sprint Race 2	2022 Barcelona Feature Race
9	(Monaco) Arthur Leclerc	2021–2022	41	3	2021 Paul Ricard Sprint Race 2	2022 Silverstone Feature Race
9	(Brazil) Caio Collet	2021–2023	54	3	2022 Budapest Sprint Race	2023 Spa-Francorchamps Sprint Race
9	(Italy) Gabriele Mini	2023–2024	38	3	2023 Monte Carlo Feature Race	2024 Monte Carlo Sprint Race
9	(Thailand) Tasanapol Inthraphuvasak	2024–2025	40	3	2025 Silverstone Sprint Race	2025 Monza Sprint Race
9	(France) Théophile Naël	2025–2026	38	3	2026 Barcelona Feature Race	2026 Madrid Sprint Race
25	(Australia) Oscar Piastri	2020	18	2	2020 Spielberg Feature Race	2020 Barcelona Sprint Race
25	(France) Théo Pourchaire	2020	18	2	2020 2nd Spielberg Sprint Race	2020 Budapest Feature Race
25	(Germany) David Beckmann	2019–2020	32	2	2020 Budapest Sprint Race	2020 Silverstone Sprint Race
25	(Brazil) Gabriel Bortoleto	2023	16	2	2023 Sakhir Feature Race	2023 Melbourne Feature Race
25	(India) Jehan Daruvala	2019	16	2	2019 Barcelona Sprint Race	2019 Paul Ricard Feature Race
25	(Germany) Oliver Goethe	2023–2024	40	2	2023 Silverstone Feature Race	2024 Imola Sprint Race
25	(United Kingdom) Luke Browning	2023–2024	38	2	2024 Sakhir Feature Race	2024 Spielberg Feature Race
25	(Sweden) Dino Beganovic	2023–2024	38	2	2024 Melbourne Feature Race	2024 Spa-Francorchamps Sprint Race
25	(France) Sami Meguetounif	2024	20	2	2024 Imola Feature Race	2024 Monza Feature Race
25	(Germany) Tim Tramnitz	2024–2025	40	2	2024 Monza Sprint Race	2025 Imola Sprint Race
25	(Mexico) Santiago Ramos	2024–2025	40	2	2025 Melbourne Sprint Race	2025 Imola Feature Race
25	(Norway) Martinius Stenshorne	2024–2025	38	2	2025 Monte Carlo Sprint Race	2025 Spielberg Feature Race
25	(Spain) Mari Boya	2023–2025	58	2	2024 Barcelona Sprint Race	2025 Silverstone Feature Race
25	(Australia) James Wharton	2024–2026	39	2	2025 Spielberg Sprint Race	2026 Barcelona Sprint Race
25	(Denmark) Noah Strømsted	2024–2026	40	2	2025 Spa-Francorchamps Sprint Race	2026 Spielberg Feature Race
25	(United States) Ugo Ugochukwu	2025–2026	38	2	2026 Melbourne Feature Race	2026 Silverstone Sprint Race
25	(Mexico) Ernesto Rivera	2026	17	2	2026 Spielberg Sprint Race	2026 Spa-Francorchamps Feature Race
42	(United States) Jak Crawford	2021–2022	38	1	2022 Spielberg Sprint Race	
42	(Brazil) Pedro Piquet	2019	16	1	2019 Spa-Francorchamps Feature Race	
42	(Germany) Lirim Zendeli	2019–2020	34	1	2020 Spa-Francorchamps Feature Race	
42	(Japan) Yuki Tsunoda	2019	16	1	2019 Monza Sprint Race	
42	(Italy) Lorenzo Colombo	2021	20	1	2021 Spa-Francorchamps Sprint Race 1	
42	(Japan) Ayumu Iwasa	2021	20	1	2021 Budapest Sprint Race 1	
42	(United Kingdom) Olli Caldwell	2020–2021	38	1	2021 Barcelona Sprint Race 2	
42	(Netherlands) Bent Viscaal	2019–2020	34	1	2020 2nd Silverstone Sprint Race	
42	(Spain) David Vidales	2022	18	1	2022 Barcelona Sprint Race	
42	(Italy) Matteo Nannini	2021	20	1	2021 Budapest Sprint Race 2	
42	(Denmark) Christian Lundgaard	2019	16	1	2019 Budapest Feature Race	
42	(United Kingdom) Oliver Bearman	2022	18	1	2022 Spa-Francorchamps Sprint Race	
42	(Czech Republic) Roman Stanek	2020–2022	56	1	2022 Imola Feature Race	
42	(Germany) David Schumacher	2019–2022	44	1	2021 Spielberg Sprint Race 2	
42	(Italy) Leonardo Pulcini	2019	19	1	2019 Silverstone Sprint Race	
42	(Estonia) Paul Aron	2023	16	1	2023 Spielberg Sprint Race	
42	(United Kingdom) Taylor Barnard	2023	16	1	2023 Spa-Francorchamps Feature Race	
42	(Italy) Nikita Bedrin	2023–2025	42	1	2024 Budapest Sprint Race	
42	(United Kingdom) Callum Voisin	2024–2025	40	1	2024 Spa-Francorchamps Feature Race	
42	(Portugal) Ivan Domingues	2025	20	1	2025 Barcelona Sprint Race	
42	(Poland) Roman Bilinski	2025	20	1	2025 Monza Sprint Race	
42	(Spain) Bruno del Pino	2025–2026	38	1	2026 Melbourne Sprint Race	
42	(China) Gerrard Xie	2025–2026	35	1	2026 Monte Carlo Sprint Race	
42	(Italy) Brando Badoer	2025–2026	38	1	2026 Monte Carlo Feature Race	
42	(Poland) Maciej Gładysz	2026	19	1	2026 Silverstone Feature Race	
42	(Japan) Jin Nakamura	2026	19	1	2026 Spa-Francorchamps Sprint Race	
42	(United Kingdom) Freddie Slater	2025–2026	22	1	2026 Budapest Feature Race	
42	(Japan) Taito Kato	2026	19	1	2026 Monza Sprint Race	
42	(Italy) Nicola Lacorte	2025–2026	36	1	2026 Monza Feature Race	
42	(Brazil) Pedro Clerot	2026	19	1	2026 Madrid Feature Race 1	
42	(Finland) Tuukka Taponen	2024–2026	40	1	2026 Madrid Feature Race 2	

== Teams' total wins ==
#	Team	Seasons	Entries	Wins	First win	Last win
1	(Italy) Prema Racing	2019–present	148	38	2019 Barcelona Feature Race	2026 Barcelona Sprint Race
2	(Italy) Trident	2019–present	148	25	2019 Spa-Francorchamps Feature Race	2026 Budapest Feature Race
3	(Spain) Campos Racing	2019–present	148	20	2021 Spa-Francorchamps Sprint Race 1	2026 Madrid Sprint Race
4	(United Kingdom) Hitech Grand Prix	2019–present	148	19	2019 Spielberg Feature Race	2026 Spa-Francorchamps Sprint Race
5	(France) ART Grand Prix	2019–present	148	14	2019 Budapest Feature Race	2026 Monza Sprint Race
6	(Netherlands) MP Motorsport	2019–present	148	11	2020 2nd Silverstone Sprint Race	2026 Madrid Feature Race 2
7	(Netherlands) Van Amersfoort Racing	2022–present	94	7	2022 Imola Sprint Race	2026 Melbourne Sprint Race
8	(Germany) HWA Racelab	2019–2021	54	4	2019 Spielberg Sprint Race	2021 Budapest Sprint Race 2
8	(New Zealand) Rodin Motorsport	2024–present	58	4	2024 Spa-Francorchamps Feature Race	2026 Madrid Feature Race 1
10	(Switzerland) Jenzer Motorsport	2019–2024	110	2	2019 Monza Sprint Race	2023 Spa-Francorchamps Feature Race
10	(France) DAMS	2025–present	38	2	2026 Monte Carlo Sprint Race	2026 Monza Feature Race
12	(Czech Republic) Charouz Racing System	2019–2022	88	1	2021 Sochi Sprint Race	
12	(Germany) AIX Racing	2024–present	58	1	2024 Budapest Sprint Race	
