= 2023 FIA Formula 3 Championship =

Motor racing championship held in 2023

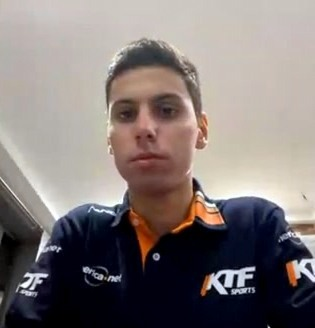
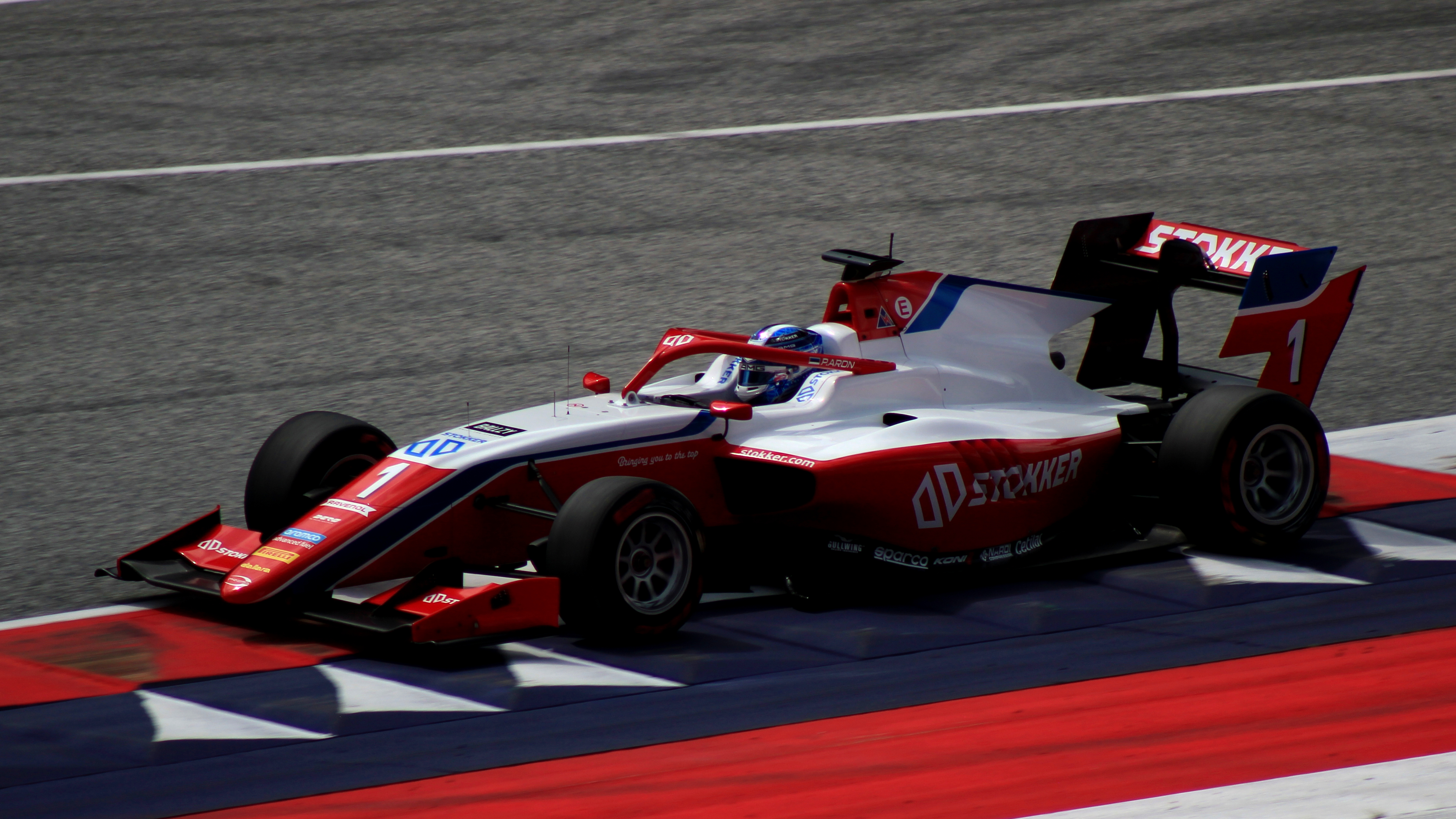
Gabriel Bortoleto (left, pictured in 2020), driving for Trident was the FIA Formula 3 Drivers' Champion. Prema Racing (right) won their fourth Teams' Championship.

The 2023 FIA Formula 3 Championship was a motor racing championship for Formula 3 cars sanctioned by the Fédération Internationale de l'Automobile (FIA). The championship was the fourteenth season of Formula 3 racing and the fifth season run under the FIA Formula 3 Championship moniker. It was an open-wheel racing category serving as the third tier of formula racing in the FIA Global Pathway. The category was run in support of selected rounds of the 2023 Formula One World Championship. As the championship was a spec series, all teams and drivers competing in the championship ran the same car, the Dallara F3 2019.

After all 18 races were completed in this season (the round in Imola being cancelled due to the 2023 Emilia-Romagna floods). Ten different drivers won races: Zak O'Sullivan took four victories, while Pepe Martí won three races this season. Franco Colapinto, Gabriele Minì and eventual Drivers' Champion Gabriel Bortoleto each won two races. Paul Aron had one victory to his name in the season, as did Oliver Goethe and Caio Collet. Taylor Barnard took his first Formula 3 win in Belgium, with Jonny Edgar following suit in the last race of the year at Monza.

Prema Racing entered the championship as the reigning Teams' Champions, having secured their title at the final race of the 2022 season in Monza. They also secured the Teams' Championship title in 2023.

Gabriel Bortoleto, driving for Trident, claimed the Drivers' Championship after qualifying at the final round at Monza.

== Entries ==
The following teams and drivers were under contract to compete in the 2023 FIA Formula 3 Championship. As the championship was a spec series, all teams competed with an identical Dallara F3 2019 chassis with a 3.4 L (207 cu in) naturally-aspirated V6 engine developed by Mecachrome. All teams competed with tyres supplied by Pirelli.

Entrant	No.	Driver name	Rounds
(Italy) Prema Racing	1	(Estonia) Paul Aron	All
(Italy) Prema Racing	2	(Sweden) Dino Beganovic	All
(Italy) Prema Racing	3	(United Kingdom) Zak O'Sullivan	All
(Italy) Trident	4	(Italy) Leonardo Fornaroli	All
(Italy) Trident	5	(Brazil) Gabriel Bortoleto	All
(Italy) Trident	6	(Germany) Oliver Goethe	All
(France) ART Grand Prix	7	(United States) Kaylen Frederick	All
(France) ART Grand Prix	8	(Switzerland) Grégoire Saucy	All
(France) ART Grand Prix	9	(Bulgaria) Nikola Tsolov	All
(Netherlands) MP Motorsport	10	(Argentina) Franco Colapinto	All
(Netherlands) MP Motorsport	11	(Spain) Mari Boya	All
(Netherlands) MP Motorsport	12	(United Kingdom) Jonny Edgar	All
(United Kingdom) Hitech Pulse-Eight	14	(Colombia) Sebastián Montoya	All
(United Kingdom) Hitech Pulse-Eight	15	(Italy) Gabriele Minì	All
(United Kingdom) Hitech Pulse-Eight	16	(United Kingdom) Luke Browning	All
(Netherlands) Van Amersfoort Racing	17	(Brazil) Caio Collet	All
(Netherlands) Van Amersfoort Racing	18	(Mexico) Rafael Villagómez	All
(Netherlands) Van Amersfoort Racing	19	(Australia) Tommy Smith	All
(United Kingdom) Rodin Carlin	20	(United Kingdom) Oliver Gray	All
(United Kingdom) Rodin Carlin	21	(United States) Hunter Yeany	1–5
(United Kingdom) Rodin Carlin	21	(United States) Max Esterson	6–7
(United Kingdom) Rodin Carlin	21	(Italy) Francesco Simonazzi	8–9
(United Kingdom) Rodin Carlin	22	(Israel) Ido Cohen	All
(Spain) Campos Racing	23	(Spain) Pepe Martí	All
(Spain) Campos Racing	24	(Australia) Christian Mansell (Note: Mansell is an Australian driver who competed under a British licence in rounds 1–6 and an Australian licence in rounds 7–9.)	All
(Spain) Campos Racing	25	(Australia) Hugh Barter	1–8
(Spain) Campos Racing	25	(Switzerland) Joshua Dufek	9
(Switzerland) Jenzer Motorsport	26	(Italy) Nikita Bedrin (Note: Bedrin is a Russian driver who competed under an Italian licence as Russian national emblems were banned by the FIA due to the Russian invasion of Ukraine.)	All
(Switzerland) Jenzer Motorsport	27	(United Kingdom) Taylor Barnard	All
(Switzerland) Jenzer Motorsport	28	(Mexico) Alex García	All
(Germany) PHM Racing by Charouz	29	(Germany) Sophia Flörsch	All
(Germany) PHM Racing by Charouz	30	(Brazil) Roberto Faria	All
(Germany) PHM Racing by Charouz	31	(Poland) Piotr Wiśnicki	1–4
(Germany) PHM Racing by Charouz	31	(United Kingdom) McKenzy Cresswell	5–6
(Germany) PHM Racing by Charouz	31	(South Korea) Michael Shin	7–9

=== Team changes ===
German Formula 4 team PHM Racing took over the entry and assets of Charouz Racing System at the end of the 2022 season, and ran in cooperation with the Czech squad under the PHM Racing by Charouz moniker.

Carlin competed under new ownership in 2023. The New Zealand-based car manufacturer Rodin Cars became majority shareholder of the team. With that, the team's name changed to Rodin Carlin.

Hitech partnered with hardware company Pulse-Eight during the off-season, changing the official name of the team to Hitech Pulse-Eight.

=== Driver changes ===
Reigning Teams' Champions Prema Racing completely changed their driver lineup, as Oliver Bearman, Arthur Leclerc and Jak Crawford all stepped up to the Formula 2 Championship. The team promoted two of their Formula Regional European Championship drivers to replace them: Ferrari Driver Academy member Dino Beganovic, who won the championship, and Mercedes junior Paul Aron, who came third in the championship. Partnering Beganovic and Aron was Williams Academy driver Zak O'Sullivan, moving from Carlin, with whom he came eleventh in the FIA Formula 3 Championship standings in 2022.

Trident also fully changed their driver lineup, as Roman Staněk and Zane Maloney moved up to Formula 2 and Jonny Edgar switched to MP Motorsport. Gabriel Bortoleto made the step up from the Formula Regional European Championship, where he came sixth in the standings in 2022. 2022 Euroformula Open Champion Oliver Goethe, who deputised for Hunter Yeany at Campos Racing at two events in 2022, joined him, and Formula Regional European rookie champion Leonardo Fornaroli took the final spot.

ART Grand Prix replaced Victor Martins, who won the Drivers' Championship with the team in 2022, with the reigning F4 Spanish Champion and Alpine affiliate Nikola Tsolov. Juan Manuel Correa also left the team to return to the Formula 2 Championship. His seat was filled by Kaylen Frederick, 2020 BRDC British F3 Champion, who came 17th with Hitech Grand Prix in his second season in FIA F3 in 2022.

MP Motorsport's three drivers from last season were all replaced. Kush Maini joined Campos Racing in Formula 2, with Mari Boya promoted from MP's Formula Regional European Championship team to replace him after the Spaniard came tenth in 2022. Jonny Edgar took over Alexander Smolyar's seat, moving over from Trident, with whom he came 12th in his second F3 season in 2022. The lineup was completed by Williams Academy driver Franco Colapinto, who came ninth in 2022 with Van Amersfoort Racing and swapped teams with Caio Collet.

Hitech Pulse-Eight recruited 2022 Formula Regional European runner-up Gabriele Minì, who replaced Red Bull junior Isack Hadjar, who left the series to join Formula 2. Kaylen Frederick also left the team and joined ART Grand Prix. His seat was filled by Sebastián Montoya, who made his championship debut in 2022 when he replaced the injured Yeany at Campos Racing in Zandvoort. The teams' lineup was completed by 2022 GB3 Champion Luke Browning.

Van Amersfoort Racing signed Caio Collet, 8th in 2022 with MP Motorsport, to replace Franco Colapinto. Reece Ushijima was superseded by Tommy Smith, who had been driving in regional F3-level series since 2019, most recently GB3 in 2022, where he took one win on the way to 19th with Douglas Motorsport.

Carlin fielded an all-new driver lineup, with Zak O'Sullivan switching to Prema, Brad Benavides graduating to Formula 2, and Enzo Trulli switching to Super Formula Lights. The latter two were replaced by 2020 F4 US Champion Hunter Yeany, moving over from Campos Racing after an injury-curtailed season, and Ido Cohen, who drove for Jenzer Motorsport in 2022 and returned to Carlin, with whom he competed in 2021 and in the 2020 Euroformula Open Championship. The team also signed one Williams Academy driver to replace another, with O'Sullivan's seat being taken over by 2022 British F4 vice-champion Oliver Gray.

Campos Racing signed Christian Mansell, who had already contested two Formula 3 rounds with Charouz Racing System in 2022, to replace David Vidales, who also moved to Super Formula Lights. Hunter Yeany also left the team to join Carlin and was replaced by 2022 Spanish F4 and French F4 vice-champion Hugh Barter.

Jenzer Motorsport had an all-rookie lineup in 2023, replacing Carlin-bound Ido Cohen, Federico Malvestiti and William Alatalo. Alex García made his Formula 3 debut after a seventh place in the 2022 Euroformula Open Championship with Motopark. Alongside him was PHM-backed Nikita Bedrin, who stepped up to the category after two years in Formula 4, with a high point of fourth place in the 2022 ADAC and UAE F4 Championships. The last seat was filled by another PHM-supported F4 graduate in Taylor Barnard, last years' ADAC F4 vice-champion.

New entrant PHM Racing by Charouz hired Sophia Flörsch for their first season in the championship, a move partially funded by FIA Formula 3 promoter Formula Motorsport. Flörsch previously drove for Campos Racing in 2020 and had competed in endurance and sportscar racing since then. She replaced Francesco Pizzi, who left FIA F3 to join TJ Speed in USF Pro 2000. Their second seat, which was shared by a handful of drivers in 2022, was filled by Roberto Faria, who competed in GB3 for the last three years, coming fifth in the latter two. The final seat was taken by Piotr Wiśnicki, who graduated to FIA F3 after a season in the Formula Regional European Championship, to replace László Tóth.

==== Mid-season changes ====
Prior to the fifth round at the Red Bull Ring, PHM Racing by Charouz announced that GB3 racer McKenzy Cresswell would take over Piotr Wiśnicki's seat for the Spielberg and Silverstone rounds.

Ahead of the sixth round at Silverstone, Hunter Yeany announced that he would leave the championship due to 'unforeseen circumstances'. His replacement for the Silverstone and Hungaroring rounds was Formula Ford Festival Champion and GB3 driver Max Esterson.

PHM Racing by Charouz hired GB3 driver Michael Shin for the remainder of the season prior to the seventh round at the Hungaroring, taking the seat previously occupied by Wiśnicki and Cresswell.

Rodin Carlin hired Euroformula Open driver Francesco Simonazzi for the remainder of the season prior to the penultimate round at the Circuit de Spa-Francorchamps, taking the seat previously occupied by Yeany and Esterson.

Joshua Dufek, whose main campaign in 2023 was the Formula Regional European Championship with Van Amersfoort Racing, replaced Hugh Barter at Campos Racing for the final round at Monza.

== Race calendar ==
Round	Circuit	Sprint race (Note: The non-championship round in Macau featured a different race weekend format, holding a "Qualifying race" on Saturday, and a "Main race" on Sunday.)	Feature race
1	Bahrain International Circuit, Sakhir	4 March	5 March
2	(Australia) Albert Park Circuit, Melbourne	1 April	2 April
3	Circuit de Monaco, Monaco	27 May	28 May
4	(Spain) Circuit de Barcelona-Catalunya, Montmeló	3 June	4 June
5	(Austria) Red Bull Ring, Spielberg	1 July	2 July
6	(United Kingdom) Silverstone Circuit, Silverstone	8 July	9 July
7	(Hungary) Hungaroring, Mogyoród	22 July	23 July
8	(Belgium) Circuit de Spa-Francorchamps, Stavelot	29 July	30 July
9	(Italy) Monza Circuit, Monza	2 September	3 September
NC	Guia Circuit, Macau	18 November	19 November

=== Calendar changes ===
- The FIA Formula 3 Championship made its debut in Australia, supporting the Australian Grand Prix at the Albert Park Circuit.
- Formula 3 returned to the Circuit de Monaco for the first time since 2012, known at the time as the GP3 Series.
- The round at Circuit Zandvoort, in support of the Dutch Grand Prix, was removed from the calendar.
- The championship was originally scheduled to feature ten rounds, but the round at Imola, in support of the Emilia Romagna Grand Prix, was cancelled along with the Formula 1 and Formula 2 rounds as a result of mass flooding which affected the region.
- The Macau Grand Prix returned to the Formula Three category for the first time since 2019, serving as a non-championship round of the FIA Formula 3 Championship.

== Regulation changes ==
=== Technical regulations ===
Formula 3 ran with 55% sustainable fuel in 2023, supplied by Aramco, who replaced Elf Aquitaine as an official fuel partner and supplier. In a bid to decrease the championships' carbon footprint, an incremental gain in usage is planned until the 2027 season, where usage of 100% sustainable fuel is planned.

== Season report ==
=== Round 1: Bahrain ===
Gabriele Minì claimed feature race pole position with the fastest qualifying time at the Bahrain International Circuit. Franco Colapinto qualified twelfth to start the reverse-grid sprint race from first place. Contact between Gabriel Bortoleto and Rafael Villagómez on lap two sent Villagómez into the barriers and brought out the safety car. As racing resumed, Pepe Martí improved to second place and later passed race leader Colapinto to take his first victory in FIA Formula 3.

On the opening lap of the feature race, pole-sitter Minì lost positions to Bortoleto and Grégoire Saucy. He reclaimed second place from Saucy shortly before the safety car was deployed to recover Tommy Smith's car, which had stalled after contact with Mari Boya. When the race restarted, Minì was issued a five-second time penalty for his car being outside the lines at the race start. He soon passed Bortoleto for the lead, and by the penultimate lap was far enough ahead of fourth-placed Dino Beganovic to stay on the podium despite his penalty, however a final-lap safety car to recover Alex García's retired Jenzer bunched the cars together and dropped Minì to eighth at the finish line. Bortoleto was awarded the victory, followed by Oliver Goethe and Beganovic, all claiming their first podiums in the category. At the end of Round 1, Bortoleto led the Drivers' Championship by three points over Goethe.

=== Round 2: Australia ===
Championship leader Bortoleto qualified fastest at the Albert Park Circuit and Sebastián Montoya started the sprint race on pole position. The safety car was deployed on the opening lap when second-placed starter Goethe received a puncture and got stuck in the gravel. Luke Browning challenged Montoya for the lead at the restart but lost positions after being launched over a kerb; Montoya was then passed by Franco Colapinto. Two more safety car periods followed to recover the crashed cars of Ido Cohen and Tommy Smith in separate incidents. One more lap of racing took place in which Montoya dropped to third place behind Zak O'Sullivan, however the race ended under a fourth safety car period when Alex García stopped in the gravel. Colapinto crossed the line first, however all three MP Motorsport cars were later disqualified for breaches of the technical regulations, handing O'Sullivan his first victory in FIA Formula 3.

Pole-sitter Bortoleto held the lead on the first lap of the feature race ahead of Grégoire Saucy and Gabriele Minì. Colapinto and Mari Boya were involved in separate accidents on lap two and the safety car was deployed, under which Kaylen Frederick also crashed. A second safety car period began on lap twelve to recover Ido Cohen's car after a collision with Rafael Villagómez; the top three maintained their positions through both restarts and to the end of the race, with Bortoleto taking a second consecutive feature race victory and Minì his first FIA Formula 3 podium. Pepe Martí, who started 30th, came through the field to finish seventh. Bortoleto's victory extended his lead in the Drivers' Championship to 20 points over Saucy.

=== Round 3: Monaco ===
Monaco became Round 3 after flooding in the Emilia-Romagna region of Italy forced the cancellation of the scheduled round at the Imola Circuit. Gabriele Minì took his second feature race pole position in qualifying at the Circuit de Monaco. Pepe Martí started the sprint race on reverse-grid pole. The safety car was deployed on the first lap of the sprint race when Jonny Edgar hit the wall at turn one and other cars received punctures. Martí held his lead at the restart and took his second victory of the year, followed by Leonardo Fornaroli with his first FIA Formula 3 podium. Taylor Barnard had started third but dropped to fifth by the end; Grégoire Saucy completed the podium.

Minì, Beganovic and Paul Aron held their top three positions through the start of the feature race and at the safety car restart after a crash by Ido Cohen. A close battle for fifth place between Sebastián Montoya and Caio Collet ended in contact and dropped both drivers to the back. Minì, Beganovic and Aron made up the podium, with Minì claiming his first win in the category, moving him to second place in the Drivers' Championship. Points leader Bortoleto was classified fifth in the feature race and now held a 17-point lead in the standings.

=== Round 4: Spain ===
Pepe Martí set the fastest time in qualifying at the Circuit de Barcelona-Catalunya and Zak O'Sullivan started the sprint race from pole position. O'Sullivan led for the entire race distance despite challenges from Luke Browning and two safety car restarts, one for a collision involving Ido Cohen and Rafael Villagómez and the second after separate incidents in which Christian Mansell and Dino Beganovic were beached in the gravel. O'Sullivan's win was his second of the season.

On the opening lap of the feature race, pole-sitter Martí held off attacks from second-placed Taylor Barnard, and a collision between Browning and Leonardo Fornaroli resulted in Browning's retirement. Martí led for the rest of the race to claim his third victory of the year. His win lifted him to second place in the Drivers' Championship, 24 points adrift of championship leader Bortoleto, who finished fourth in both races.

=== Round 5: Austria ===
Grégoire Saucy claimed feature race pole at the Red Bull Ring and Martí started first in the sprint race, which took place in wet conditions. Martí led the majority of the sprint race whilst Paul Aron, who had started eighth, made his way up the order to second place. Racing was paused during a safety car period to recover the collided cars of Rafael Villagómez and Oliver Gray, and Aron began to pressure Martí for the lead when racing resumed. Aron took first place with three laps remaining to claim his first victory in the series, whilst Martí dropped to sixth place in the closing laps.

Contact between teammates Gabriele Minì and Luke Browning brought out the safety car on the first lap of the feature race. Soon after racing resumed, Dino Beganovic overtook pole-sitter Saucy for first place. Beganovic, Saucy, Aron and championship leader Bortoleto fought closely for the lead in the following laps, but contact between Saucy and Aron gave both drivers damage and dropped them down the order. Beganovic complained of tyre wear and began to fall back; the lead was taken by Bortoleto and then O'Sullivan, who had started sixth, soon after. The final podium position was contested by Franco Colapinto, Sebastián Montoya and Caio Collet in a close final-lap battle. Contact between the former two demoted Montoya out of contention and allowed Collet through to third place. O'Sullivan crossed the finish line to achieve his third win of the year, followed by Bortoleto, whose championship advantage now stood at 36 points over Martí.

=== Round 6: United Kingdom ===
Leonardo Fornaroli set the fastest qualifying time at Silverstone Circuit and Sebastián Montoya started the sprint race from first place. Franco Colapinto, who started fourth, improved to second place on the opening lap but dropped behind Taylor Barnard shortly after. Rain began to fall on lap 8 of 18 and the safety car was deployed due to the conditions; some drivers opted to switch to wet-weather tyres but the top three stayed out on slicks. As racing resumed, Barnard made contact with Montoya, allowing Colapinto to pass both of them for the lead. The wet tyre runners had an early advantage but dropped back in the closing laps as the track dried. Colapinto claimed his first win of the year and Christian Mansell his first FIA Formula 3 podium.

Fornaroli built a lead on the first lap of the feature race before racing was paused to recover the car of Luke Browning after a collision with Hugh Barter. Oliver Goethe, who started second, passed Fornaroli for the lead with seven laps remaining. Rain started to fall shortly after and a crash involving Roberto Faria and Tommy Smith prompted a second safety car. Smith was the only driver to switch to wet tyres, and rose from the back of the field to 11th place in the two remaining racing laps, but was later demoted with a time penalty. The order of the top three remained unchanged, and Goethe took his first win in the category. At the end of the round, Bortoleto's lead in the championship remained at 36 points ahead of Martí.

=== Round 7: Hungary ===
Feature race pole position at the Hungaroring was claimed by Zak O'Sullivan, his first of the season. Gabriele Minì qualified 12th to start the sprint race on pole position. Minì was overtaken by Nikita Bedrin at the first corner, but later reclaimed the lead on lap eight. The top two built a gap to Bortoleto in third, but their advantage was nullified in the closing laps when the safety car was deployed to recover Sebastián Montoya's broken-down car. Bortoleto passed Bedrin for second place at the final corner of the last lap. Minì took his second win of the season and Bedrin claimed Jenzer Motorsport's first podium of the year.

The feature race was shortened due to concerns over excessive tyre wear. O'Sullivan led the entire race distance and set the fastest lap on his way to his fourth victory of the season. He was followed by teammate Dino Beganovic and fellow Williams junior Franco Colapinto. O'Sullivan's victory promoted him to second place in the standings, one point ahead of Pepe Martí and 43 points behind championship leader Bortoleto.

=== Round 8: Belgium ===
Martí took pole position at the Circuit de Spa-Francorchamps whilst Bortoleto qualified 15th. Hugh Barter started first in the sprint race, but dropped positions on the opening lap. The lead passed to Taylor Barnard who was soon overtaken by Caio Collet, who had started fourth. The 12-lap race was interrupted by three safety car periods; firstly when Rafael Villagómez collided with Sebastián Montoya, secondly when Martí hit the car of Ido Cohen whilst rejoining the track, and thirdly when Bortoleto came to a halt on the Kemmel straight. The race ended behind the safety car. Collet's victory was his first of the season.

The feature race began in damp conditions and the drivers were split on tyre choice, most starting on slicks and some on wets. The wet tyre runners had an immediate advantage and Paul Aron, who started 11th, was in the lead before the end of the first lap. Oliver Goethe crashed on lap 5 of 15 and brought out the safety car, prompting some of the wet tyre runners, including Aron, to switch to slick tyres. The lead passed to Barnard as racing resumed. Aron had emerged from the pits ahead of the original slick runners, but they were unable to catch up to the wet tyre runners before the end of the race. Barnard was challenged by Christian Mansell for the lead in the closing laps, but Barnard held the position to claim his first victory in the series. Bortoleto's championship lead now stood at 38 points ahead of Aron with 39 points possible in the final round.

=== Round 9: Italy ===
Oliver Goethe set the fastest qualifying time at Monza Circuit prior to crashing and causing a red flag, securing his pole position. As neither of Bortoleto's remaining championship rivals, Aron and Martí, claimed the two points on offer for pole position, Bortoleto secured the title after qualifying and became Trident's first FIA Formula 3 champion. Franco Colapinto started on sprint race pole after five drivers were disqualified from the results due to parc fermé regulation breaches. Mari Boya, who started second, passed Colapinto for the lead off the start line. Contact between Aron and Caio Collet gave Aron a puncture, which caused a first-corner collision that eliminated Aron, Martí and Jonny Edgar from the race. On lap 10, Colapinto regained the lead and third-placed Grégoire Saucy received a puncture after contact with Zak O'Sullivan, promoting Bortoleto to the podium places. The lead was traded between Colapinto and Boya over the next few laps, until Colapinto ultimately built a gap and Boya was passed by Bortoleto for second place. Colapinto's win was his second of the season and Boya claimed his first podium in the series. Goethe, Luke Browning and Gabriele Minì finished in the points positions despite all starting outside the top 20, but fifth-placed Browning was later disqualified for a technical infringement.

A throttle issue forced feature race pole-sitter Goethe out of the race on the formation lap, allowing Caio Collet to start from the front. The race was interrupted by four safety car periods as Grégoire Saucy, Sebastián Montoya, and championship runner-up contenders Colapinto and Martí were all forced into the gravel in separate incidents. Jonny Edgar gained second place from Aron on the opening lap and later passed Collet for the lead on lap six. The two drivers swapped the lead over the next few laps before Collet ultimately fell behind Zak O'Sullivan and Taylor Barnard to finish fourth. Edgar's race win was his first podium finish in three years of FIA Formula 3. O'Sullivan's podium lifted him to second place in the Drivers' Championship. Champion Bortoleto finished fifth and claimed the fastest lap, extending his lead to 45 points. Despite Trident driver Bortoleto's championship victory, Prema Racing clinched the Teams' Championship at the final race.

== Results and standings ==
=== Season summary ===
Round		Circuit	Pole position	Fastest lap	Winning driver	Winning team	Report
1	SR	Bahrain International Circuit		(Spain) Pepe Martí	(Spain) Pepe Martí	(Spain) Campos Racing	Report
1	FR	Bahrain International Circuit	(Italy) Gabriele Minì	(Brazil) Gabriel Bortoleto	(Brazil) Gabriel Bortoleto (Note: Gabriele Minì finished first on track, but was handed a 5-second time penalty for a starting procedure infringement. Bortoleto inherited the win.)	(Italy) Trident	Report
2	SR	(Australia) Albert Park Circuit		(United Kingdom) Luke Browning (Note: Franco Colapinto set the fastest lap, but was later disqualified from the race, and with that had all his lap times deleted, for a technical non-conformity. Luke Browning therefore set the fastest lap of the race but did not finish in the top ten, so was ineligible to score the point for it. Christian Mansell scored the point for setting the fastest lap of those finishing in the top ten.)	(United Kingdom) Zak O'Sullivan (Note: Franco Colapinto originally won the race, but was later disqualified from the race for a technical non-conformity. Zak O'Sullivan inherited the win.)	(Italy) Prema Racing	Report
2	FR	(Australia) Albert Park Circuit	(Brazil) Gabriel Bortoleto	(Switzerland) Grégoire Saucy	(Brazil) Gabriel Bortoleto	(Italy) Trident	Report
3	SR	Circuit de Monaco		(Australia) Hugh Barter (Note: Hugh Barter set the fastest lap of the race but did not finish in the top ten, so was ineligible to score the point for it. Sebastián Montoya scored the point for setting the fastest lap of those finishing in the top ten.)	(Spain) Pepe Martí	(Spain) Campos Racing	Report
3	FR	Circuit de Monaco	(Italy) Gabriele Minì	(Italy) Gabriele Minì	(Italy) Gabriele Minì	(United Kingdom) Hitech Pulse-Eight	Report
4	SR	(Spain) Circuit de Barcelona-Catalunya		(United Kingdom) Zak O'Sullivan	(United Kingdom) Zak O'Sullivan	(Italy) Prema Racing	Report
4	FR	(Spain) Circuit de Barcelona-Catalunya	(Spain) Pepe Martí	(Spain) Pepe Martí	(Spain) Pepe Martí	(Spain) Campos Racing	Report
5	SR	(Austria) Red Bull Ring		(Estonia) Paul Aron	(Estonia) Paul Aron	(Italy) Prema Racing	Report
5	FR	(Austria) Red Bull Ring	(Switzerland) Grégoire Saucy	(Sweden) Dino Beganovic	(United Kingdom) Zak O'Sullivan	(Italy) Prema Racing	Report
6	SR	(United Kingdom) Silverstone Circuit		(Estonia) Paul Aron (Note: Paul Aron set the fastest lap of the race but did not finish in the top ten, so was ineligible to score the point for it. Leonardo Fornaroli scored the point for setting the fastest lap of those finishing in the top ten.)	(Argentina) Franco Colapinto	(Netherlands) MP Motorsport	Report
6	FR	(United Kingdom) Silverstone Circuit	(Italy) Leonardo Fornaroli	(United Kingdom) Zak O'Sullivan (Note: Zak O'Sullivan set the fastest lap of the race but did not finish in the top ten, so was ineligible to score the point for it. Pepe Martí scored the point for setting the fastest lap of those finishing in the top ten.)	(Germany) Oliver Goethe	(Italy) Trident	Report
7	SR	(Hungary) Hungaroring		(Brazil) Gabriel Bortoleto	(Italy) Gabriele Minì	(United Kingdom) Hitech Pulse-Eight	Report
7	FR	(Hungary) Hungaroring	(United Kingdom) Zak O'Sullivan	(United Kingdom) Zak O'Sullivan	(United Kingdom) Zak O'Sullivan	(Italy) Prema Racing	Report
8	SR	(Belgium) Circuit de Spa-Francorchamps		(Brazil) Caio Collet	(Brazil) Caio Collet	(Netherlands) Van Amersfoort Racing	Report
8	FR	(Belgium) Circuit de Spa-Francorchamps	(Spain) Pepe Martí	(Switzerland) Grégoire Saucy (Note: Grégoire Saucy set the fastest lap of the race but did not finish in the top ten, so was ineligible to score the point for it. Pepe Martí scored the point for setting the fastest lap of those finishing in the top ten.)	(United Kingdom) Taylor Barnard	(Switzerland) Jenzer Motorsport	Report
9	SR	(Italy) Monza Circuit		(Germany) Oliver Goethe	(Argentina) Franco Colapinto	(Netherlands) MP Motorsport	Report
9	FR	(Italy) Monza Circuit	(Germany) Oliver Goethe	(Brazil) Gabriel Bortoleto	(United Kingdom) Jonny Edgar	(Netherlands) MP Motorsport	Report
NC	QR	(Macau) Guia Circuit	(United Kingdom) Luke Browning	(United Kingdom) Luke Browning	(United Kingdom) Luke Browning	(United Kingdom) Hitech Pulse-Eight	Report
NC	MR	(Macau) Guia Circuit	(United Kingdom) Luke Browning	(United Kingdom) Luke Browning	(United Kingdom) Luke Browning	(United Kingdom) Hitech Pulse-Eight	Report

=== Scoring system ===
Points were awarded to the top ten classified finishers in both races. The pole-sitter in the feature race also received two points, and one point was given to the driver who set the fastest lap in both the feature and sprint races, provided that driver finished inside the top ten. If the driver who set the fastest lap was classified outside the top ten, the point was given to the driver who set the fastest lap of those inside the top ten. No extra points where awarded to the pole-sitter in the sprint race as the grid for it was set by reversing the top twelve qualifiers.

Sprint race points

Points were awarded to the top ten classified finishers. A bonus point was awarded to the driver who set the fastest lap and finished in the top ten.

Position	1st	2nd	3rd	4th	5th	6th	7th	8th	9th	10th	FL
Points	10	9	8	7	6	5	4	3	2	1	1

Feature race points

Points were awarded to the top ten classified finishers. Bonus points were awarded to the pole-sitter and to the driver who set the fastest lap and finished in the top ten.

Position	1st	2nd	3rd	4th	5th	6th	7th	8th	9th	10th	Pole	FL
Points	25	18	15	12	10	8	6	4	2	1	2	1

=== Drivers' Championship standings ===
Pos.	Driver	BHR (Bahrain)		ALB (Australia)		MON (Monaco)		CAT (Spain)		RBR (Austria)		SIL (United Kingdom)		HUN (Hungary)		SPA (Belgium)		MNZ (Italy)		Points
Pos.	Driver	SR	FR	SR	FR	SR	FR	SR	FR	SR	FR	SR	FR	SR	FR	SR	FR	SR	FR	Points
1	(Brazil) Gabriel Bortoleto	19	1^{F}	6	1^{P}	6	5	4	4	10	2	2	6	2^{F}	7	Ret	11	2	5^{F}	164
2	(United Kingdom) Zak O'Sullivan	12	11	1	5	13	7	1^{F}	8	4	1	16	18	22	1^{P F}	15	12	11	2	119
3	(Estonia) Paul Aron	5	12	3	6	10	3	5	5	1^{F}	25	12	4	4	5	3	8	Ret	7	112
4	(Argentina) Franco Colapinto	2	10	DSQ	Ret	4	6	6	2	13	4	1	8	7	3	5	10	1	Ret	110
5	(Spain) Pepe Martí	1^{F}	6	13	7	1	9	8	1^{P F}	6	9	10	3^{F}	20	6	Ret	9^{P F}	Ret	Ret	105
6	(Sweden) Dino Beganovic	4	3	5	13	12	2	Ret	3	8	5^{F}	13	14	10	2	22	16	13	9	96
7	(Italy) Gabriele Minì	17	8^{P}	4	3	11	1^{P F}	20	14	2	Ret	5	7	1	16	Ret	DNS	6	19	92
8	(Germany) Oliver Goethe	6	2	Ret	22	17	13	11	16	26	11	17	1	5	4	Ret	Ret	5^{F}	Ret^{P}	75
9	(Brazil) Caio Collet	3	14	21	16	9	Ret	17	12	3	3	4	15	23	19	1^{F}	5	19	4	73
10	(United Kingdom) Taylor Barnard	14	16	12	9	5	8	9	9	27	12	30	21	11	14	2	1	4	3	72
11	(Italy) Leonardo Fornaroli	8	27	7	4	2	24	3	NC	15	10	7^{F}	2^{P}	13	9	9	14	8	15	69
12	(Australia) Christian Mansell	13	13	9^{F}	10	20	17	Ret	10	14	7	3	5	6	11	19	2	7	8	60
13	(United Kingdom) Jonny Edgar	9	23	DSQ	11	Ret	14	12	15	5	6	28	NC	8	8	4	19	Ret	1	55
14	(Switzerland) Grégoire Saucy	7	4	8	2^{F}	3	10	23	27	20	27^{P}	21	9	9	15	10	20	22	Ret	54
15	(United Kingdom) Luke Browning	Ret	5	17	8	8	4	2	Ret	11	22	14	Ret	16	12	8	23	DSQ	18	41
16	(Colombia) Sebastián Montoya	10	9	2	Ret	7^{F}	DSQ	26	7	9	20	8	10	Ret	24	Ret	6	12	Ret	37
17	(Spain) Mari Boya	15	Ret	DSQ	Ret	Ret	18	7	6	12	24	29	12	21	10	16	13	3	6	29
18	(Italy) Nikita Bedrin	16	17	15	23†	15	12	10	11	25	13	18	17	3	23	11	3	15	Ret	24
19	(Australia) Hugh Barter	11	26	19	15	25	26	19	13	22	8	6	13	25	13	6	22			14
20	(Mexico) Alex García	27	29†	Ret	20	26	21	22	22	Ret	23	11	26	27†	26	18	4	17	21	12
21	(United States) Kaylen Frederick	28	7	10	Ret	24	25	14	17	7	26	22	19	12	Ret	13	15	20	Ret	11
22	(Bulgaria) Nikola Tsolov	26	15	11	21	14	11	13	19	16	16	15	11	Ret	25	7	17	9	12	6
23	(Germany) Sophia Flörsch	22	20	16	18	23	23	21	20	18	DSQ	19	23	15	18	12	7	16	13	6
24	(Israel) Ido Cohen	18	18	Ret	Ret	19	Ret	Ret	26	17	Ret	9	24	Ret	22	Ret	Ret	21	Ret	2
25	(Mexico) Rafael Villagómez	Ret	19	14	19	16	16	27	25	Ret	15	20	16	17	17	23	21	10	10	2
26	(Italy) Francesco Simonazzi															14	24	18	11	0
27	(Australia) Tommy Smith	23	28†	Ret	12	21	15	18	23	21	18	26	25	24	29	24	18	Ret	20	0
28	(United Kingdom) Oliver Gray	21	21	20	14	22	19	15	18	Ret	14	25	20	14	27	20	Ret	Ret	16	0
29	(Switzerland) Joshua Dufek																	14	14	0
30	(United States) Hunter Yeany	20	22	22	17	27	20	16	Ret	19	21									0
31	(Brazil) Roberto Faria	24	25	18	Ret	Ret	27	25	24	24	19	27	Ret	19	20	17	Ret	NC	22†	0
32	(South Korea) Michael Shin													26	28	21	25	Ret	17	0
33	(United Kingdom) McKenzy Cresswell									23	17	23	22							0
34	(Poland) Piotr Wiśnicki	25	24	23	Ret	18	22	24	21											0
35	(United States) Max Esterson											24	Ret	18	21					0
Pos.	Driver	SR	FR	SR	FR	SR	FR	SR	FR	SR	FR	SR	FR	SR	FR	SR	FR	SR	FR	Points
Pos.	Driver	BHR (Bahrain)		ALB (Australia)		MON (Monaco)		CAT (Spain)		RBR (Austria)		SIL (United Kingdom)		HUN (Hungary)		SPA (Belgium)		MNZ (Italy)		Points

Key
Colour	Result
Gold	Winner
Silver	Second place
Bronze	Third place
Green	Other points position
Blue	Other classified position
Blue	Not classified, finished (NC)
Purple	Not classified, retired (Ret)
Red	Did not qualify (DNQ)
Black	Disqualified (DSQ)
White	Did not start (DNS)
White	Race cancelled (C)
Blank	Did not practice (DNP)
Blank	Excluded (EX)
Blank	Did not arrive (DNA)
Blank	Withdrawn (WD)
Blank	Did not enter (empty cell)
Annotation	Meaning
P	Pole position
F	Fastest lap

Notes:

- † – Driver did not finish the race, but was classified as he completed more than 90% of the race distance.

=== Teams' Championship standings ===
Pos.	Team	BHR (Bahrain)		ALB (Australia)		MON (Monaco)		CAT (Spain)		RBR (Austria)		SIL (United Kingdom)		HUN (Hungary)		SPA (Belgium)		MNZ (Italy)		Points
Pos.	Team	SR	FR	SR	FR	SR	FR	SR	FR	SR	FR	SR	FR	SR	FR	SR	FR	SR	FR	Points
1	(Italy) Prema Racing	4	3	1	5	10	2	1^{F}	3	1^{F}	1	12	4	4	1^{P F}	3	8	11	2	327
1	(Italy) Prema Racing	5	11	3	6	12	3	5	5	4	5^{F}	13	14	10	2	15	12	13	7	327
1	(Italy) Prema Racing	12	12	5	13	13	7	Ret	8	8	25	16	18	22	5	22	16	Ret	9	327
2	(Italy) Trident	6	1^{F}	6	1^{P}	2	5	3	4	10	2	2	1	2^{F}	4	9	11	2	5^{F}	308
2	(Italy) Trident	8	2	7	4	6	13	4	16	15	10	7^{F}	2^{P}	5	7	Ret	14	5^{F}	15	308
2	(Italy) Trident	19	27	Ret	22	17	24	11	NC	26	11	17	6	13	9	Ret	Ret	8	Ret^{P}	308
3	(Netherlands) MP Motorsport	2	10	DSQ	11	4	6	6	2	5	4	1	8	7	3	4	10	1	1	194
3	(Netherlands) MP Motorsport	9	23	DSQ	Ret	Ret	14	7	6	12	6	28	12	8	8	5	13	3	6	194
3	(Netherlands) MP Motorsport	15	Ret	DSQ	Ret	Ret	18	12	15	13	24	29	NC	21	10	16	19	Ret	Ret	194
4	(Spain) Campos Racing	1^{F}	6	9^{F}	7	1	9	8	1^{P F}	6	7	3	3^{F}	6	6	6	2	7	8	179
4	(Spain) Campos Racing	11	13	13	10	20	17	19	10	14	8	6	5	20	11	19	9^{P F}	14	14	179
4	(Spain) Campos Racing	13	26	19	15	25	26	Ret	13	22	9	10	13	25	13	Ret	22	Ret	Ret	179
5	(United Kingdom) Hitech Pulse-Eight	10	5	2	3	7^{F}	1^{P F}	2	7	2	20	5	7	1	12	8	6	6	18	170
5	(United Kingdom) Hitech Pulse-Eight	17	8^{P}	4	8	8	4	20	14	9	22	8	10	16	16	Ret	23	12	19	170
5	(United Kingdom) Hitech Pulse-Eight	Ret	9	17	Ret	11	DSQ	26	Ret	11	Ret	14	Ret	Ret	24	Ret	DNS	DSQ	Ret	170
6	(Switzerland) Jenzer Motorsport	14	16	12	9	5	8	9	9	25	12	11	17	3	14	2	1	4	3	108
6	(Switzerland) Jenzer Motorsport	16	17	15	20	15	12	10	11	27	13	18	21	11	23	11	3	15	21	108
6	(Switzerland) Jenzer Motorsport	27	29†	Ret	23†	26	21	22	22	Ret	23	30	26	27†	26	18	4	17	Ret	108
7	(Netherlands) Van Amersfoort Racing	3	14	14	12	9	15	17	12	3	3	4	15	17	17	1^{F}	5	10	4	75
7	(Netherlands) Van Amersfoort Racing	23	19	21	16	16	16	18	23	21	15	20	16	23	19	23	18	19	10	75
7	(Netherlands) Van Amersfoort Racing	Ret	28†	Ret	19	21	Ret	27	25	Ret	18	26	25	24	29	24	21	Ret	20	75
8	(France) ART Grand Prix	7	4	8	2^{F}	3	10	13	17	7	16	15	9	9	15	7	15	9	12	71
8	(France) ART Grand Prix	26	7	10	21	14	11	14	19	16	26	21	11	12	25	10	17	20	Ret	71
8	(France) ART Grand Prix	28	15	11	Ret	24	25	23	27	20	27^{P}	22	19	Ret	Ret	13	20	22	Ret	71
9	(Germany) PHM Racing by Charouz	22	20	16	18	18	22	21	20	18	17	19	22	15	18	12	7	16	13	6
9	(Germany) PHM Racing by Charouz	24	24	18	Ret	23	23	24	21	23	19	23	23	19	20	17	25	NC	17	6
9	(Germany) PHM Racing by Charouz	25	25	23	Ret	Ret	27	25	24	24	DSQ	27	Ret	26	28	21	Ret	Ret	22†	6
10	(United Kingdom) Rodin Carlin	18	18	20	14	19	19	15	18	17	14	9	20	14	21	14	24	18	11	2
10	(United Kingdom) Rodin Carlin	20	21	22	17	22	20	16	26	19	21	24	24	18	22	20	Ret	21	16	2
10	(United Kingdom) Rodin Carlin	21	22	Ret	Ret	27	Ret	Ret	Ret	Ret	Ret	25	Ret	Ret	27	Ret	Ret	Ret	Ret	2
Pos.	Team	SR	FR	SR	FR	SR	FR	SR	FR	SR	FR	SR	FR	SR	FR	SR	FR	SR	FR	Points
Pos.	Team	BHR (Bahrain)		ALB (Australia)		MON (Monaco)		CAT (Spain)		RBR (Austria)		SIL (United Kingdom)		HUN (Hungary)		SPA (Belgium)		MNZ (Italy)		Points

Key
Colour	Result
Gold	Winner
Silver	Second place
Bronze	Third place
Green	Other points position
Blue	Other classified position
Blue	Not classified, finished (NC)
Purple	Not classified, retired (Ret)
Red	Did not qualify (DNQ)
Black	Disqualified (DSQ)
White	Did not start (DNS)
White	Race cancelled (C)
Blank	Did not practice (DNP)
Blank	Excluded (EX)
Blank	Did not arrive (DNA)
Blank	Withdrawn (WD)
Blank	Did not enter (empty cell)
Annotation	Meaning
P	Pole position
F	Fastest lap

Notes:

- † – Driver did not finish the race, but was classified as he completed more than 90% of the race distance.
- Rows are not related to the drivers: within each team, individual race standings are sorted purely based on the final classification in the race (not by total points scored in the event, which includes points awarded for fastest lap and pole position).
