= Nikola Tsolov =

Bulgarian racing driver (born 2006)

- Никола Цолов
- Tsolov in 2026
- Born: Nikola Dimitrov Tsolov; 21 December 2006 (age 19); Sofia, Bulgaria
- Nationality: (Bulgaria) Bulgarian

FIA Formula 2 Championship career
- Debut season: 2025
- Current team: Campos Racing
- Car number: 6
- Starts: 29
- Wins: 6
- Podiums: 10
- Poles: 0
- Fastest laps: 3
- Best finish: 18th in 2025

Previous series
- 2023–2025; 2023–2024; 2023; 2022: FIA Formula 3; Eurocup-3; FR Middle East; F4 Spanish

Championship titles
- 2022: F4 Spanish
- Statistics up to date as of 26 September 2026.
- Website: nikolatsolov.com

Nikola Dimitrov Tsolov (Bulgarian: Никола Димитров Цолов, pronounced [ni'kɔɫa dimiˈtrɔf ˈt͡sɔɫɔf]; born 21 December 2006) is a Bulgarian racing driver who competes in the FIA Formula 2 Championship for Campos Racing as part of the Red Bull Junior Team.

Born and raised in Sofia, Tsolov began competitive kart racing aged nine, winning several national and continental titles before graduating to junior formulae in 2022. He won the F4 Spanish Championship in his rookie season. Nicknamed "the Bulgarian Lion", (Note: Following his successes in FIA Formula 3, Tsolov was nicknamed the Bulgarian Lion (Bulgarian: Българският лъв) in domestic media, in reference to the national animal of Bulgaria, which features on the coat of arms.) he won 5 times in FIA Formula 3 (3 sprints and 2 feature races) from 2023 to 2025, finishing runner-up to Rafael Câmara in the latter.

A member of the Alpine Academy from 2022 to 2024 and the Red Bull Junior Team since 2025, Tsolov will serve as the reserve driver for both Red Bull Racing and Racing Bulls during the 2027 Formula One season.

== Early life and family background ==
Nikola Dimitrov Tsolov was born on 21 December 2006 in Sofia, Bulgaria. His father, Dimitar, works as an IT specialist, while his mother, Miroslava, is a music teacher. He also has an older sister, Violeta.

Tsolov became interested in motorsport at the age of nine, when his father took him to an indoor karting track at Sofia Ring Mall, before enrolling him in a children's sports camp at the National Sports Academy. During the camp, former Formula BMW Germany driver Nikolay Varbitsaliev recognised Tsolov's potential and told his father that his son had talent. Following Varbitsaliev's recommendation, Tsolov's father took him to an audition for the young drivers' karting academy at the track in Kyustendil.

== Junior racing career ==
=== Karting (2016–2021) ===
Tsolov began his karting career in 2016, competing in the Bulgarian Republic Championship. He won the Republican championship in the Bulgarian Mini class in 2016 and 2017.

In 2018, Tsolov moved to the Italian championships. He won the WSK Open Cup in 60 Mini karts in 2019. He then came seventh in the CIK-FIA World Championship in OKJ in 2020, and was second in the 2021 WSK Final Cup in OK, driving for DPK Racing as part of Fernando Alonso's FA Racing team. Tsolov was invited by Alonso to drive alongside him, Pedro de la Rosa, Ángel Burgueño, and Alberto Fernandez in the 2021 edition of 24h Endurance race in Dubai, where they finished 3rd.

=== Formula 4 (2022) ===
After competing for Fernando Alonso's karting team for two years, Tsolov became one of the first drivers to join A14 Management along with Clément Novalak. Tsolov joined the F4 Spanish Championship for 2022 with Campos. He started the season at Algarve with a double pole. In the first race, he finished 14th after a problem at the start, but he finished in fifth in the second race and won the third, along with setting the fastest lap in every race. He kept the good pace in the second round at the Circuito de Jerez by setting a pole position and a fastest lap in all three races, finishing second in the first race and winning second and third races, which took him to the lead of the championship. The next weekend at Circuit Ricardo Tormo he dominated the field, winning all three starts along with two pole-positions and another three fastest laps. Tsolov secured his championship win on 2 October, after finishing second in the third race at Circuito de Navarra, winning the title three races before the end of season.

=== Formula 3 (2023–2025) ===
==== 2023: Debut in FIA Formula 3 ====
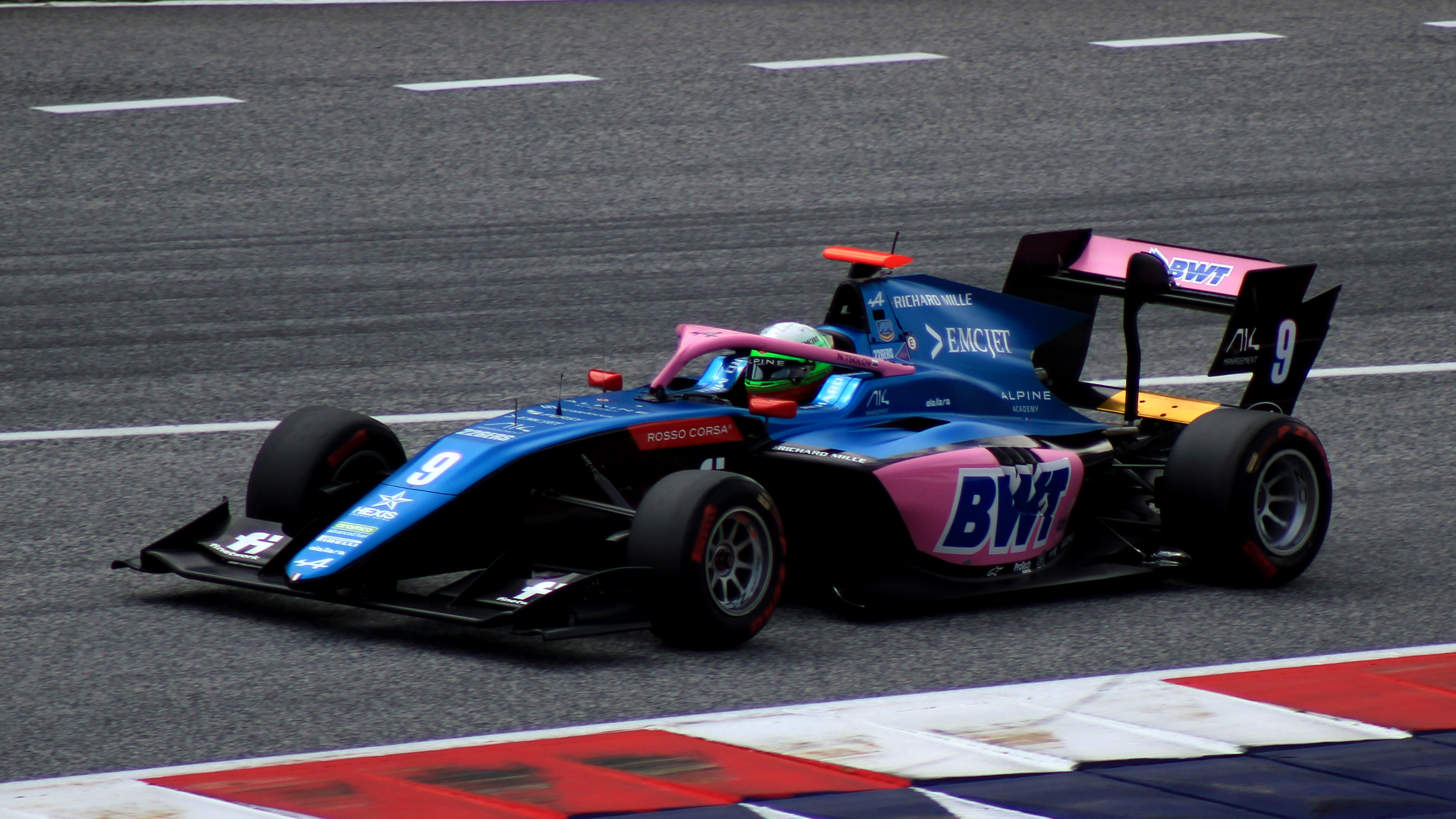
Tsolov driving the Dallara F3 2019 during the 2023 Spielberg Formula 3 round

In September 2022, Tsolov took part in the FIA Formula 3 post-season test, driving for ART Grand Prix. On 19 December it was announced that he would be one of ART Grand Prix drivers for the 2023 season. In February 2023, Tsolov took part in the last round of Formula Regional Middle East Championship driving for R&B Racing by GRS, as part of his preparation for F3. In the first race of the weekend, he finished in ninth place, finished sixth place in the second race and 15th in the third one. He was the only driver to score points for R&B Racing in the championship.

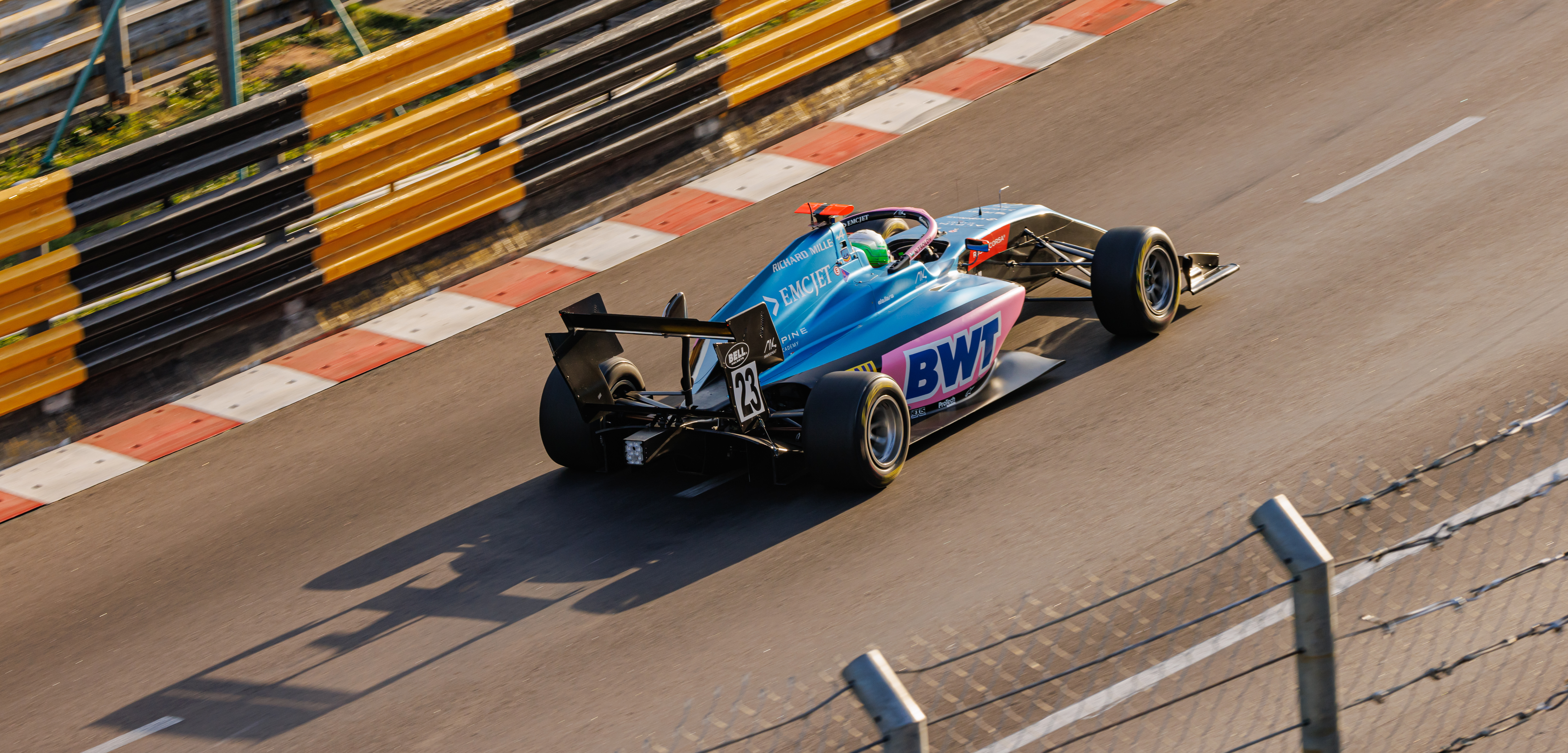
Tsolov at the 2023 Macau Grand Prix

Across his campaign in FIA Formula 3, Tsolov scored two points finishes in the sprint races in Spa-Francorchamps and Monza. He finished the season in 22nd place. Shortly after the season, Tsolov contested Eurocup-3 with GRS Team. He entered two of the eight rounds, finishing the championship in tenth place with two podiums.

==== 2024: Maiden victories ====
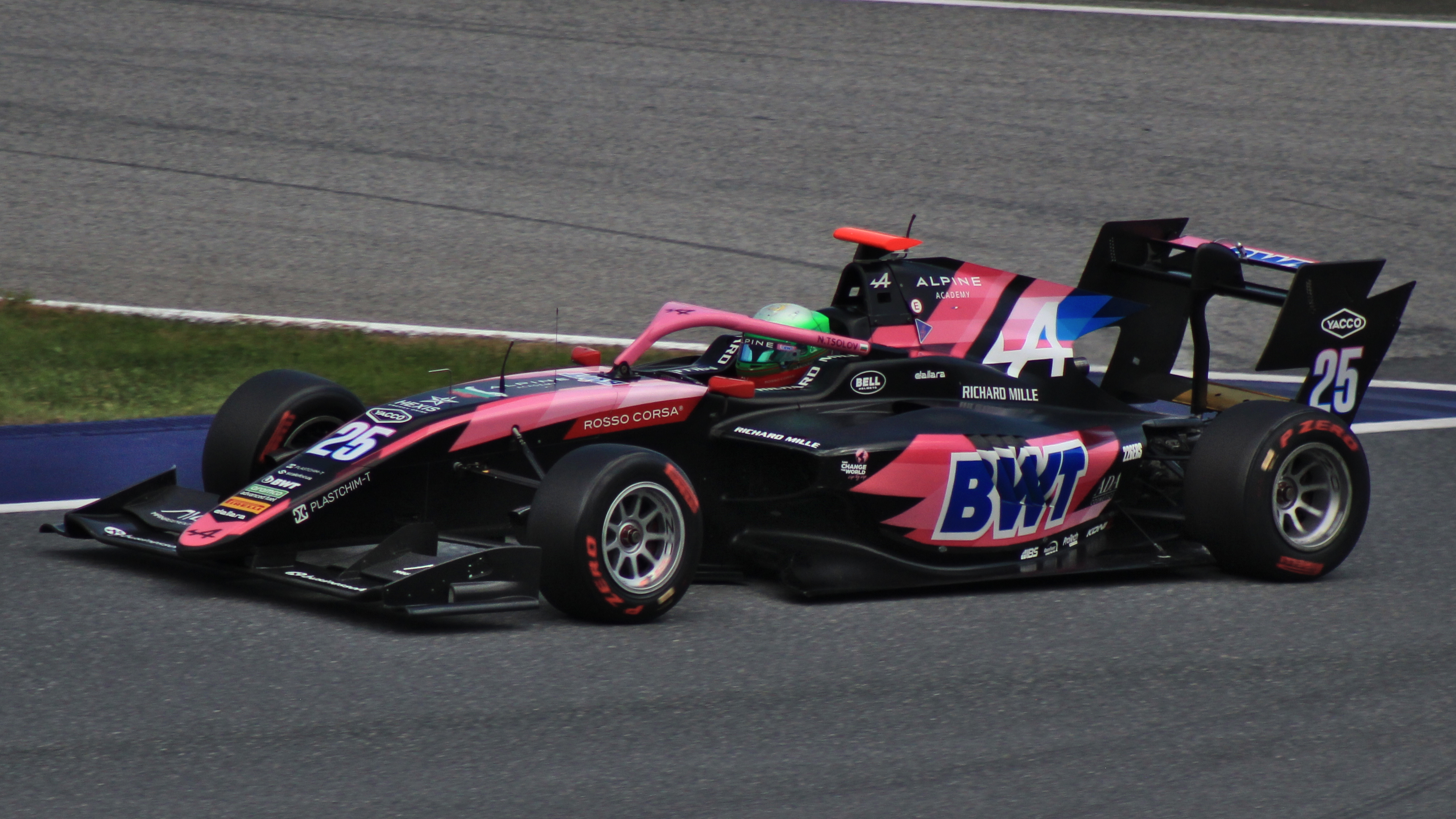
Tsolov driving for ART Grand Prix during the 2024 Spielberg Formula 3 round

ART Grand Prix retained Tsolov for the 2024 season. His first victory came in Monaco, where he won the sprint race. He was the first Bulgarian driver to win a race in the series. His second win of the season came in the sprint race in round 6 of the championship in Spielberg, and he took a third in the Hungary feature race. Tsolov would miss the round at Spa-Francorchamps due to racing there in Eurocup-3 because of the rule that you cannot drive at an circuit on the F3 or F2 calendar if you race there earlier in the year. Because Tsolov was barred from competing, he was replaced by Tuukka Taponen. He finished the season in 11th overall. Alongside his FIA Formula 3 campaign, Tsolov signed with GRS Team to compete in the full 2024 Eurocup-3 season. He finished 11th in the championship with only one podium.

==== 2025: Runner-up in F3 ====
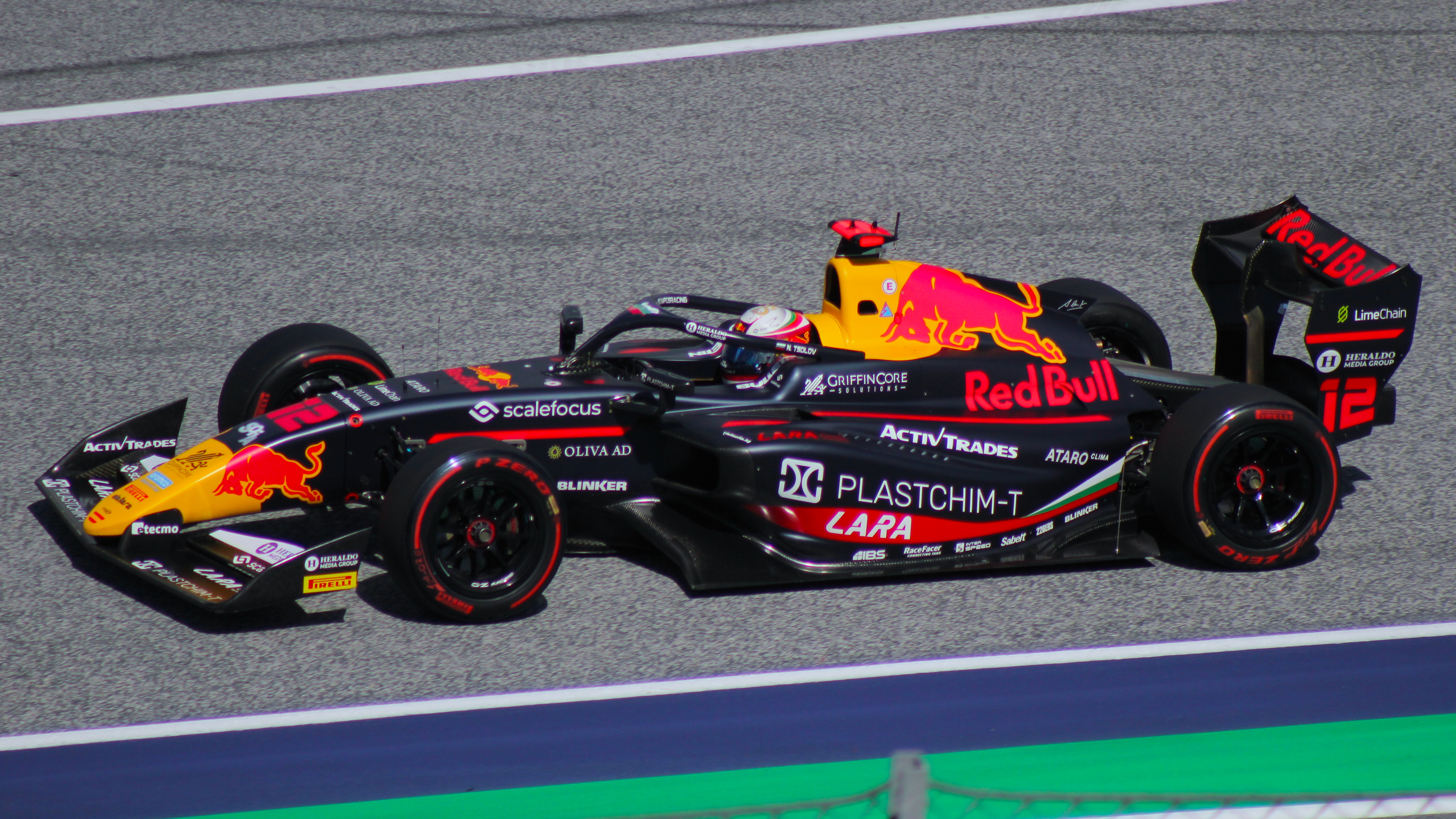
Tsolov driving the Dallara F3 2025 during the 2025 Spielberg Formula 3 round

In the 2025 off-season, Tsolov competed in one round of the 2025 Eurocup-3 Spanish Winter Championship with Campos Racing. He finished races one and two in fourth place, and retired from race three. He finished 12th in the standings with 22 points. Tsolov returned to Campos Racing, the team he won the 2022 F4 Spanish Championship with, for his third FIA Formula 3 season, partnering Mari Boya and Tasanapol Inthraphuvasak. He took his first win of the season in Bahrain, equalling the record for most wins in the series. In Monaco, Tsolov took his maiden F3 pole position, topping the Group A session ahead of teammate Boya. He went on to win the feature race, making him the first driver to win five races in FIA Formula 3.

=== FIA Formula 2 (2025–present) ===
==== 2025: Debut ====
Tsolov made an early debut in FIA Formula 2 in 2025, replacing Formula E–bound Pepe Martí at Campos Racing for the closing two rounds. On debut in Lusail, he qualified seventh. At the sprint race in Abu Dhabi, Tsolov finished third, getting his first podium finish in Formula 2.

==== 2026: Rookie season ====
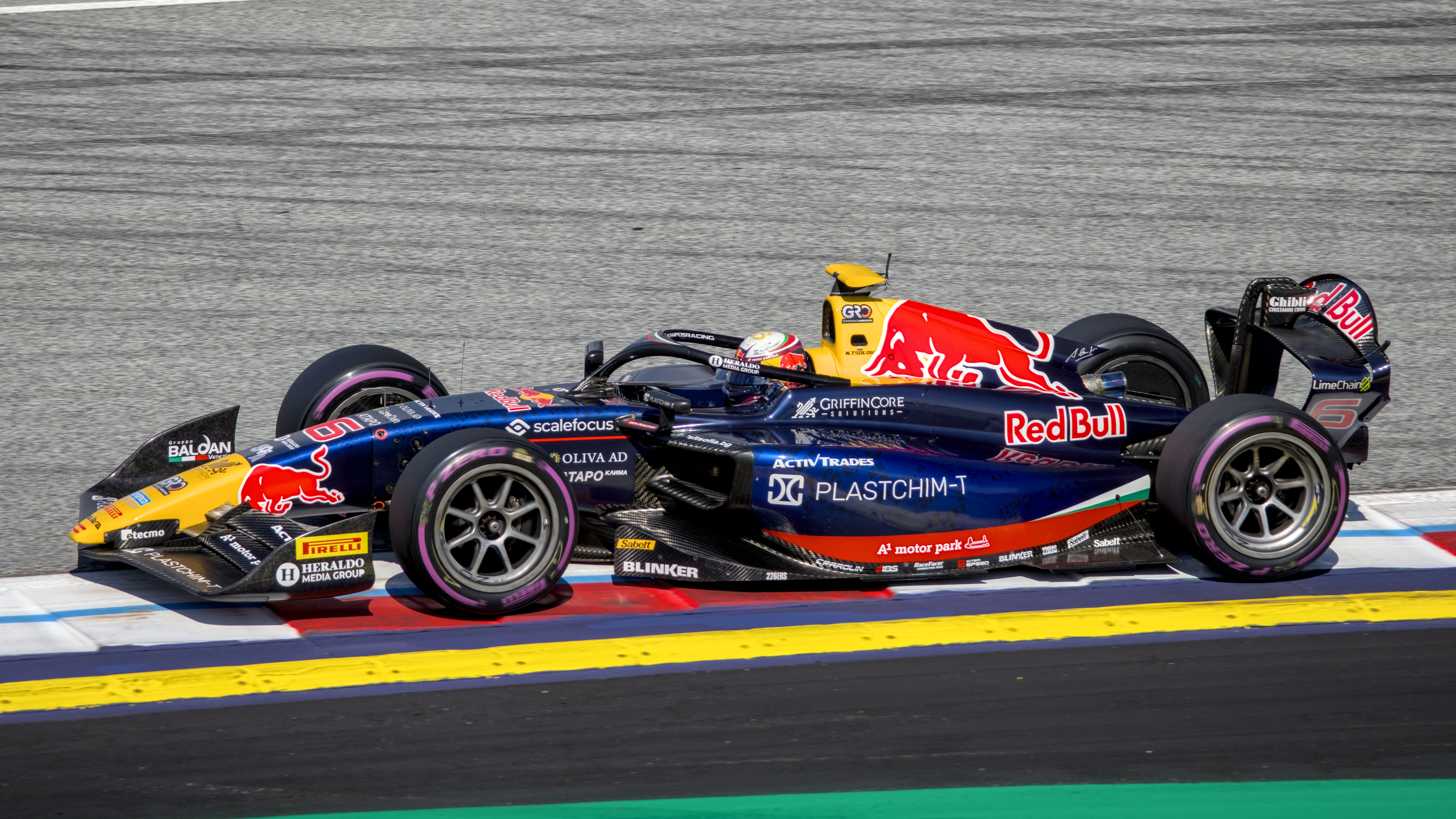
Tsolov driving the Dallara F2 2024 during the 2026 Spielberg Formula 2 round

In September 2025, Tsolov was announced as a full-time driver for 2026, remaining with Campos. Tsolov won the feature race at the opening round at Melbourne, getting his first victory in Formula 2. His next win came in the sprint race of the Miami Grand Prix, making him the first ever F2 winner in Miami after a skirmish with Van Hoepen who was 0.170 seconds behind Tsolov. His third win of the season came in the Feature Race in Monaco, starting in second behind his 2025 F3 rival Rafael Camara, who was on pole position. Camara led the race until lap 34, when, after a pit stop, he struggled to bring his cold tyres up to temperature and locked up, running wide at Sainte-Dévote and retiring from the race. This allowed Tsolov to take the lead and win the race. He also set the fastest lap. The next weekend in the sprint race in Barcelona, he ended with a podium on third. After that in the Feature race in Austria at the Red Bull Ring, he got his fourth win starting from third. Then his most dominant weekend of his career came at Silverstone, where he ended up qualifying fifth for the feature race and sixth for the sprint. In the sprint Tsolov made a good start, going up to third by turn 1. He overtook Rafael Villagómez on lap 9, taking second, and overtook Gabriele Minì on the last lap to take the win. In the feature race he again made a good launch of the line and went up to second, behind Kush Maini, whom he overtook on lap 20 to win the feature race. He was the first driver to win both the sprint and feature races in a weekend since Zane Maloney, who won the 2024 Sakhir Formula 2 round. Tsolov also became the first driver in FIA Formula 2 history to win three races in a row.

== Formula One ==
Tsolov became a member of the Alpine Affiliate programme in March 2022. On 14 February 2023, he was promoted to a full member of Alpine Academy. On 4 November 2024, Tsolov announced on social media that he would leave the academy with immediate effect. One day later, he was announced to be joining the Red Bull Junior Team for 2025. He debuted in Formula One machinery at a Sofia Red Bull showrun that June, driving the Red Bull RB7.

In June 2026, Spanish media SoyMotor alleged that Tsolov has a guaranteed seat at Racing Bulls for the 2027 Formula One season, in place of Liam Lawson, but that was later dismissed by the Racing Bulls team principal Alan Permane.

In July, it was revealed by Racing Bulls CEO Peter Bayer that the team are planning to hold a Testing of Previous Cars (TPC) test with Tsolov later in the year.

Tsolov's second running in Formula One machinery was at the 2026 Goodwood Festival of Speed, where he drove the Red Bull RB8 painted with a Racing Bulls livery.

On 27 August 2026, Tsolov completed his first Formula 1 Testing of Previous Cars (TPC) test at Imola, driving the Racing Bulls VCARB 02. He completed 690 km, more than double the required 300 km for participation in an FP1 session, with his best time being reported as 1:16.95.

On 30 October 2026, Tsolov made his debut in F1 at the Friday free practice session 1 (FP1) of the Mexico City Grand Prix, finishing 12th fastest, and the fastest out of all the junior drivers that made an FP1 outside the top 4 teams. Tsolov is the first driver from Bulgaria to participate in an F1 weekend.

On 11 and 12 November 2026, Tsolov completed his second Formula 1 Testing of Previous Cars (TPC) session at the Hungaroring, driving the same Racing Bulls VCARB 02 used during his first test at Imola in August.

On 12 November 2026, Red Bull Racing and Racing Bulls announced that Tsolov would serve as their shared reserve driver for the 2027 Formula 1 season, with responsibilities including simulator and development work, further FP1 appearances and Testing of Previous Cars (TPC) programmes.

== Karting record ==
=== Karting career summary ===
Season	Series	Team	Position
2016	Bulgarian Republic Championship — Mini		**1st**
2017	Bulgarian Republic Championship — Mini		**1st**
2017	ROK Cup Italy — Mini ROK	Speed Kart	25th
2018	WSK Open Cup — 60 Mini	Birel ART Racing	33rd
2018	WSK Final Cup — 60 Mini	Birel ART Racing	21st
2019	South Garda Winter Cup — Mini ROK	Newman Motorsport	14th
2019	WSK Super Master Series — 60 Mini	Newman Motorsport	14th
2019	Italian Championship — 60 Mini	Team Driver Racing Kart	12th
2019	Trofeo delle Industrie — 60 Mini	Team Driver Racing Kart	11th
2019	WSK Euro Series — 60 Mini	Team Driver Racing Kart	11th
2019	ROK Cup Superfinal — Mini ROK	Team Driver Racing Kart	12th
2019	WSK Open Cup — 60 Mini	Team Driver Racing Kart	**1st**
2019	WSK Final Cup — 60 Mini	Team Driver Racing Kart	13th
2020	WSK Champions Cup — OK-J	DPK Racing	11th
2020	South Garda Winter Cup — OK-J	DPK Racing	11th
2020	WSK Super Master Series — OK-J	DPK Racing	NC
2020	CIK-FIA European Championship — OK-J	DPK Racing	19th
2020	WSK Euro Series — OK-J	DPK Racing	11th
2020	Champions of the Future — OK-J	DPK Racing	15th
2020	CIK-FIA World Championship — OK-J	DPK Racing	7th
2020	WSK Open Cup — OK	DPK Racing	5th
2021	WSK Champions Cup — OK	DPK Racing	8th
2021	Trofeo del Grifone — OK	DPK Racing	**1st**
2021	WSK Super Master Series — OK	DPK Racing	8th
2021	WSK Euro Series — OK	DPK Racing	4th
2021	Italian Championship — X30 Senior	DPK Racing	**2nd**
2021	CIK-FIA European Championship — OK	DPK Racing	4th
2021	WSK Open Cup — OK	DPK Racing	5th
2021	Champions of the Future — OK	DPK Racing	**3rd**
2021	CIK-FIA World Championship — OK	DPK Racing	5th
2021	South Garda Winter Cup — OK	DPK Racing	4th
2021	WSK Final Cup — OK	DPK Racing	**2nd**
2021	24 Hours of Dubai — Superkarts	MD Racing	**3rd**

=== Complete CIK-FIA Karting European Championship results ===
(key) (Races in bold indicate pole position) (Races in italics indicate fastest lap)

Year	Team	Class	1	2	3	4	5	6	7	8	DC	Points
2020	DPK Racing	OKJ	ZUE; QH; 15	ZUE; R 8	SAR; QH; 13	SAR; R NR	WAC; QH; 43	WAC; R DNQ			19th	8
2021	DPK Racing	OK	GEN; QH; 7	GEN; R 5	AUB; QH; 14	AUB; R 29	SAR; QH; 1	**SAR**; **R** 2	ZUE; QH; 2	ZUE; R 17	4th	55

=== Complete Karting World Championship results ===
Year	Team	Class	Quali Heats	Main race
2020	(Spain) DPK Racing	OKJ	4th	**7th**
2021	(Spain) DPK Racing	OK	7th	**5th**

== Racing record ==
=== Racing career summary ===
Season	Series	Team	Races	Wins	Poles	F/Laps	Podiums	Points	Position
2022	F4 Spanish Championship	Campos Racing	21	13	15	17	18	400	**1st**
2023	Formula Regional Middle East Championship	R&B Racing by GRS	3	0	0	0	0	10	23rd
2023	FIA Formula 3 Championship	ART Grand Prix	18	0	0	0	0	6	22nd
2023	Macau Grand Prix	ART Grand Prix	1	0	0	0	0	—N/a	DNF
2023	Eurocup-3	GRS Team	4	0	2	2	2	44	10th
2024	FIA Formula 3 Championship	ART Grand Prix	18	3	0	1	3	75	11th
2024	Eurocup-3	GRS Team	10	0	0	0	1	47	11th
2025	Eurocup-3 Spanish Winter Championship	Campos Racing	3	0	0	0	0	22	12th
2025	FIA Formula 3 Championship	Campos Racing	19	2	3	1	6	124	**2nd**
2025	FIA Formula 2 Championship	Campos Racing	4	0	0	0	1	12	18th
2026	FIA Formula 2 Championship	Campos Racing	25	6	0	3	9	200*	**2nd***
2026	Formula One	Visa Cash App Racing Bulls F1 Team	Test driver						

* Season still in progress.

=== Complete F4 Spanish Championship results ===
(key) (Races in bold indicate pole position) (Races in italics indicate fastest lap)

Year	Team	1	2	3	4	5	6	7	8	9	10	11	12	13	14	15	16	17	18	19	20	21	Pos	Points	Ref
2022	Campos Racing	**ALG**; **1**; 14	**ALG**; **2**; 1	ALG; 3; 5	**JER**; **1**; 2	**JER**; **2**; 1	**JER**; **3**; 1	**CRT**; **1**; 1	**CRT**; **2**; 1	CRT; 3; 1	**SPA**; **1**; 1	**SPA**; **2**; 1	**SPA**; **3**; 1	**ARA**; **1**; 2	**ARA**; **2**; 1	ARA; 3; 4	NAV; 1; 3	NAV; 2; 2	NAV; 3; 3	**CAT**; **1**; 1	**CAT**; **2**; 1	**CAT**; **3**; 1	1st	400	

=== Complete Formula Regional Middle East Championship results ===
(key) (Races in bold indicate pole position) (Races in italics indicate fastest lap)

Year	Entrant	1	2	3	4	5	6	7	8	9	10	11	12	13	14	15	DC	Points	Ref
2023	R&B Racing (GRS)	DUB1; 1	DUB1; 2	DUB1; 3	KUW1; 1	KUW1; 2	KUW1; 3	KUW2; 1	KUW2; 2	KUW2; 3	DUB2; 1	DUB2; 2	DUB2; 3	ABU; 1; 9	ABU; 2; 6	ABU; 3; 15	23rd	10	

† – Driver did not finish the race but was classified, as he completed more than 90% of the race distance.

=== Complete FIA Formula 3 Championship results ===
(key) (Races in bold indicate pole position; races in italics indicate points for the fastest lap of the top-10 finishers)

Year	Entrant	1	2	3	4	5	6	7	8	9	10	11	12	13	14	15	16	17	18	19	20	Pos	Points	Ref
2023	ART Grand Prix	BHR; SPR; 26	BHR; FEA; 15	MEL; SPR; 11	MEL; FEA; 21	MON; SPR; 14	MON; FEA; 11	CAT; SPR; 13	CAT; FEA; 19	RBR; SPR; 16	RBR; FEA; 16	SIL; SPR; 15	SIL; FEA; 11	HUN; SPR; Ret	HUN; FEA; 25	SPA; SPR; 7	SPA; FEA; 17	MNZ; SPR; 9	MNZ; FEA; 12			22nd	6	
2024	ART Grand Prix	BHR; SPR; 4	BHR; FEA; 11	MEL; SPR; 20	MEL; FEA; 19	IMO; SPR; 13	IMO; FEA; 26	MON; SPR; 1	MON; FEA; 27	CAT; SPR; 13	CAT; FEA; 6	RBR; SPR; 1	RBR; FEA; 6	SIL; SPR; 5	SIL; FEA; 15	HUN; SPR; 29	HUN; FEA; 1	SPA; SPR	SPA; FEA	MNZ; SPR; 19	MNZ; FEA; 17	11th	75	
2025	Campos Racing	MEL; SPR; 8	MEL; FEA; Ret	BHR; SPR; 1	BHR; FEA; 5	IMO; SPR; 3	IMO; FEA; 9	MON; SPR; 24	**MON**; **FEA**; 1	CAT; SPR; 3	CAT; FEA; 5	RBR; SPR; 3	**RBR**; **FEA**; DSQ	SIL; SPR; 29	**SIL**; **FEA**; 20	SPA; SPR; 4	SPA; FEA; C	HUN; SPR; 15	HUN; FEA; 6	MNZ; SPR; 22	MNZ; FEA; 2	2nd	124	

=== Complete Macau Grand Prix results ===
Year	Team	Car	Qualifying	Quali Race	Main race
2023	(France) ART Grand Prix	Dallara F3 2019	15th	13th	DNF

=== Complete Eurocup-3 results ===
(key) (Races in bold indicate pole position) (Races in italics indicate fastest lap)

Year	Team	1	2	3	4	5	6	7	8	9	10	11	12	13	14	15	16	17	DC	Points	Ref
2023	GRS Team	SPA; 1	SPA; 2	ARA; 1	ARA; 2	MNZ; 1	MNZ; 2	ZAN; 1	ZAN; 2	**JER**; **1**; 2	**JER**; **2**; 2	EST; 1	EST; 2	CRT; 1; 9	CRT; 2 Ret	CAT; 1 WD	CAT; 2 WD		10th	44	
2024	GRS Team	SPA; 1 Ret	SPA; 2 C	RBR; 1	RBR; 2	POR; 1; 9	POR; 2; 9	POR; 3; 8	LEC; 1	LEC; 2	ZAN; 1; 6	ZAN; 2; 8	ARA; 1; 5	ARA; 2; 3	JER; 1; 10	JER; 2 Ret	CAT; 1	CAT; 2	11th	47	

=== Complete Eurocup-3 Spanish Winter Championship results ===
(key) (Races in bold indicate pole position) (Races in italics indicate fastest lap)

Year	Team	1	2	3	4	5	6	7	8	DC	Points	Ref
2025	Campos Racing	JER; 1; 4	JER; 2; 4	JER; 3 Ret	POR; 1	POR; 2	POR; 3	ARA; 1	ARA; 2	12th	22	

=== Complete FIA Formula 2 Championship results ===
(key) (Races in bold indicate pole position; races in italics indicate points for the fastest lap of the top-10 finishers)

Year	Entrant	1	2	3	4	5	6	7	8	9	10	11	12	13	14	15	16	17	18	19	20	21	22	23	24	25	26	27	28	29	Pos	Points	Ref
2025	Campos Racing	MEL; SPR	MEL; FEA	BHR; SPR	BHR; FEA	JED; SPR	JED; FEA	IMO; SPR	IMO; FEA	MON; SPR	MON; FEA	CAT; SPR	CAT; FEA	RBR; SPR	RBR; FEA	SIL; SPR	SIL; FEA	SPA; SPR	SPA; FEA	HUN; SPR	HUN; FEA	MNZ; SPR	MNZ; FEA	BAK; SPR	BAK; FEA	LSL; SPR; 10	LSL; FEA; 7	YMC; SPR; 3	YMC; FEA; 12		18th	12	
2026	Campos Racing	MEL; SPR; 17	MEL; FEA; 1	MIA; SPR; 1	MIA; FEA; Ret	MTL; SPR; 14	MTL; FEA; 12	MON; SPR; 10	MON; FEA; 1	CAT; SPR; 3	CAT; FEA; 4	RBR; SPR; 8	RBR; FEA; 1	SIL; SPR; 1	SIL; FEA; 1	SPA; SPR; 4	SPA; FEA; 3	HUN; SPR; Ret	HUN; FEA; 7	MNZ; SPR; 5	MNZ; FEA; 7	MAD; SPR; Ret	MAD; FEA; 18	BAK; SPR; 5	BAK; FEA1; Ret	BAK; FEA2; 2	LSL; SPR	LSL; FEA	YMC; SPR	YMC; FEA	2nd*	200*	

* Season still in progress.

=== Complete Formula One participations ===
(key) (Races in bold indicate pole position) (Races in italics indicate fastest lap)

Year	Entrant	Chassis	Engine	1	2	3	4	5	6	7	8	9	10	11	12	13	14	15	16	17	18	19	20	21	22	23	WDC	Points	Ref
2026	Visa Cash App Racing Bulls F1 Team	Racing Bulls VCARB 03	Red Bull Ford DM01 1.6 V6 t	AUS	CHN	JPN	MIA	CAN	MON	BCN	AUT	GBR	BEL	HUN	NED	ITA	ESP	AZE	BHR	SIN	USA	MXC; TD	SAP	LVG	QAT	ABU	–	–	

== Notes ==
Sporting positions
Preceded by Dilano van 't Hoff	F4 Spanish Championship; Champion; 2022	Succeeded by Théophile Naël
