= Pierre-Alexandre Provost =

Luxembourgish-French racing driver

- Provost at Silverstone Circuit in 2026
- Nationality: (Luxembourg) Luxembourgish
- Born: 11 April 2006 (age 20) Luxembourg

European Le Mans Series career
- Debut season: 2026
- Current team: R-ace GP
- Categorisation: FIA Silver
- Car number: 85
- Starts: 1
- Wins: 0
- Podiums: 1
- Poles: 1
- Fastest laps: 0

Previous series
- 2025–26 2025 2024 2023 2021–22: Asian Le Mans Series; Le Mans Cup; Ultimate Cup Series - NP02; FR European Championship; French F4 Championship

Pierre-Alexandre Provost (born 11 April 2006) is a Luxembourgish racing driver currently competing in the Le Mans Cup. He also competes in the Asian Le Mans Series for R-ace GP.

== Career ==
=== Junior formulae ===
Provost began his car racing career in 2021, competing in the French F4 Championship. After struggling in the opening three rounds, Provost benefited from the reversed-top-ten format for race 2 at Lédenon, as he started from pole and took victory. The same format later helped him towards another podium — second place at Magny-Cours — on his way to 11th in the standings. Provost later admitted that he "was lost at first", having started the season at the age of fourteen and with minimal karting experience; he also began studying at a boarding school in Le Mans as part of a sports-study programme.

In 2022, Provost remained in French F4. At the season opener in Nogaro, Provost scored his first main-race podium with second in race 3. His next podium came in the reversed-grid race at Magny-Cours, finishing second after losing the lead to Yuto Nomura. Provost then endured a retirement-laden streak in four of the next five races; he clipped a stalled Souta Arao at the start in Magny-Cours race 3, got stranded in the gravel at turn one of race 1 at Spa-Francorchamps and was collected at the same turn in race 3, and spun out of the opening Lédenon event. The tables turned in race 2, as Provost took the lead at the start and remained ahead of Hugh Barter for his second win in the series. In race 3, Provost finished eighth after clipping Nomura into a spin. The final incident of Provost's season came in Valencia, where he retired after colliding with Edgar Pierre. He concluded the season with third and fourth places in the Le Castellet feature races, results that helped him towards eighth in the championship.

During the latter months of 2022, Provost partook in the Formula Regional European Championship post-season tests with G4 Racing. After focusing on his studies during the first half of 2023, Provost joined G4 ahead of the sixth round of the 2023 FRECA season. Provost finished 26th in his series debut at Le Castellet. His best result ended up being 14th in Monza, and Provost finished 30th in the standings with no points to his name.

=== Sports car career ===
In 2024, Provost joined MV2S for his maiden sports car season, driving in the NP02 class of the Ultimate Cup Series alongside Christophe Cresp. The pair claimed two class podiums, finishing third at Portimão and Paul Ricard, and ended up eighth in the NP02 drivers' standings. The Portimão race proved a highlight, as Provost climbed from 20th to the lead during his first stint.

Provost stepped up to the LMP3 category in 2025, piloting a Ligier JS P325 in the Le Mans Cup. He was joined by youngster Alvise Rodella at CLX Motorsport. During the season opener in Barcelona-Catalunya, Provost and Rodella finished second in a 1-2 finish for CLX. At the following round in Le Castellet, Provost scored the first pole of his career. He drove out a gap early on during the race and claimed victory.

== Racing record ==
=== Racing career summary ===
Season	Series	Team	Races	Wins	Poles	F/Laps	Podiums	Points	Position
2021	French F4 Championship	FFSA Academy	20	1	0	0	2	50	11st
2022	French F4 Championship	FFSA Academy	21	1	0	0	4	95	8th
2023	Formula Regional European Championship	G4 Racing	9	0	0	0	0	0	30th
2024	Ultimate Cup Series - NP02	MV2S	6	0	0	1	2	52	8th
2025	Le Mans Cup - LMP3	CLX Motorsport	7	1	1	1	3	62	4th
2025–26	Asian Le Mans Series - LMP3	R-ace GP	4	0	0	0	0	30	13rd
2026	European Le Mans Series - LMP3	R-ace GP	6	1	2	1	3	76	4th

* Season still in progress.

=== Complete French F4 Championship results ===
(key) (Races in bold indicate pole position) (Races in italics indicate fastest lap)

Year	1	2	3	4	5	6	7	8	9	10	11	12	13	14	15	16	17	18	19	20	21	Pos	Points
2021	NOG; 1; 12	NOG; 2; 10	NOG; 3; 14†	MAG1; 1; 10	MAG1; 2; 12	MAG1; 3; 10	HUN; 1; 11	HUN; 2; 11	HUN; 3; 11	LÉD; 1; 10	LÉD; 2; 1	LÉD; 3; 12	MNZ; 1; 8	MNZ; 2; 9	MNZ; 3 C	LEC; 1 Ret	LEC; 2; 11	LEC; 3; 16	MAG2; 1; 9	MAG2; 2; 2	MAG2; 3; 8	11th	50
2022	NOG; 1; 4	NOG; 2; 10	NOG; 3; 2	PAU; 1 Ret	PAU; 2; 17	PAU; 3; 7	MAG; 1; 10	MAG; 2; 2	MAG; 3 Ret	SPA; 1 Ret	SPA; 2; 14	SPA; 3 Ret	LÉD; 1 Ret	LÉD; 2; 1	LÉD; 3; 8	CRT; 1; 12	CRT; 2 Ret	CRT; 3; 17	LEC; 1; 3	LEC; 2; 11	LEC; 3; 4	8th	95

=== Complete Formula Regional European Championship results ===
(key) (Races in bold indicate pole position) (Races in italics indicate fastest lap)

Year	Team	1	2	3	4	5	6	7	8	9	10	11	12	13	14	15	16	17	18	19	20	DC	Points
2023	G4 Racing	IMO; 1	IMO; 2	CAT; 1	CAT; 2	HUN; 1	HUN; 2	SPA; 1	SPA; 2	MUG; 1	MUG; 2	LEC; 1; 26	LEC; 2 Ret	RBR; 1; 32	RBR; 2 Ret	MNZ; 1; 14	MNZ; 2; 31	ZAN; 1 DNS	ZAN; 2 Ret	HOC; 1; 20	HOC; 2; 25	30th	0

=== Complete Ultimate Cup Series results ===
(key) (Races in bold indicate pole position; results in italics indicate fastest lap)

Year	Entrant	Class	Chassis	1	2	3	4	5	6	Rank	Points
2024	MV2S	NP02	Nova Proto NP02	LEC1; Ret	ALG; 4	HOC; 8	MUG; 14	MAG; 4	LEC2; 4	8th	52

^{*} Season still in progress.

=== Complete Le Mans Cup results ===
(key) (Races in bold indicate pole position; results in italics indicate fastest lap)

Year	Entrant	Class	Chassis	1	2	3	4	5	6	7	Rank	Points
2025	CLX Motorsport	LMP3	Ligier JS P325	CAT; 2	**LEC**; 1	LMS; 1; 9	LMS; 2; 21	SPA; 11	SIL; 3	ALG; Ret	4th	62

=== Complete Asian Le Mans Series results ===
(key) (Races in bold indicate pole position) (Races in italics indicate fastest lap)

Year	Team	Class	Car	Engine	1	2	3	4	5	6	Pos.	Points
2025–26	R-ace GP	LMP3	Duqueine D09	Toyota V35A 3.5 L V6	SEP; 1; 8	SEP; 2; 6	DUB; 1	DUB; 2	ABU; 1; 4	ABU; 2; 7	13th	30

=== Complete European Le Mans Series results ===
(key) (Races in bold indicate pole position; results in italics indicate fastest lap)

Year	Entrant	Class	Chassis	Engine	1	2	3	4	5	6	Rank	Points
2026	R-ace GP	LMP3	Duqueine D09	Toyota V35A 3.5 L V6	**CAT**; 2	LEC; 6	IMO; 8	SPA; 2	SIL; 1	ALG; 10	4th	76

^{*} Season still in progress.
