= 2022 French F4 Championship =

French motorsport season

The 2022 French F4 Championship was the 12th season to run under the guise of the French F4 Championship and the fifth under the FIA Formula 4 regulations. The championship switched to Mygale M21-F4 chassis. The series began on 16 April at Circuit Paul Armagnac and ended on 16 October at Circuit Paul Ricard.

Alessandro Giusti won the championship with two races to spare.

== Driver lineup ==
No.	Driver	Class	Rounds
4	(France) Pablo Sarrazin		All
5	(Andorra) Pol López		All
6	(India) Amir Sayed		1–4
6	(United States) Garrett Berry	G	7
7	(Switzerland) Dario Cabanelas		All
8	(France) Romain Andriolo		All
9	(France) Lény Réveillère		All
10	(France) Alessandro Giusti		All
11	(France) Pierre-Alexandre Provost		All
15	(Japan) Yuto Nomura		All
16	(France) Luciano Morano		1–4, 7
23	(Belgium) Lorens Lecertua		All
25	(France) Louis Pelet		All
27	(France) Edgar Pierre		All
28	(Germany) Max Reis		All
33	(Japan) Souta Arao		All
36	(France) Enzo Géraci		All
37	(France) Antoine Fernande		All
46	(France) Elliott Vayron		All
66	(France) Enzo Richer		All
68	(Australia) Hugh Barter		All
69	(Colombia) Jerónimo Berrío		All
72	(Ecuador) Mateo Villagómez		All
74	(France) Enzo Peugeot		All
77	(Panama) Valentino Mini		All

Icon	Status
G	Guest drivers ineligible for Drivers' Championship

== Race calendar ==
Alongside the provisional entry list for the championship, the schedule was announced on 22 December 2021.

Round		Circuit	Date	Pole position	Fastest lap	Winning driver
1	R1	(France) Circuit Paul Armagnac, Nogaro	17 April	(Australia) Hugh Barter	(Japan) Souta Arao	(Australia) Hugh Barter
1	R2	(France) Circuit Paul Armagnac, Nogaro	17 April		(Japan) Yuto Nomura	(Japan) Yuto Nomura
1	R3	(France) Circuit Paul Armagnac, Nogaro	18 April	(Australia) Hugh Barter	(Australia) Hugh Barter	(Australia) Hugh Barter
2	R1	(France) Circuit de Pau-Ville, Pau	7 May	(Japan) Souta Arao	(Australia) Hugh Barter	(Australia) Hugh Barter
2	R2	(France) Circuit de Pau-Ville, Pau	7 May		(Australia) Hugh Barter	(France) Romain Andriolo
2	R3	(France) Circuit de Pau-Ville, Pau	8 May	(Australia) Hugh Barter	(Australia) Hugh Barter	(Japan) Souta Arao
3	R1	(France) Circuit de Nevers Magny-Cours, Magny-Cours	14 May	(Australia) Hugh Barter	(Switzerland) Dario Cabanelas	(Australia) Hugh Barter
3	R2	(France) Circuit de Nevers Magny-Cours, Magny-Cours	14 May		(Japan) Yuto Nomura	(Japan) Yuto Nomura
3	R3	(France) Circuit de Nevers Magny-Cours, Magny-Cours	15 May	(Australia) Hugh Barter	(Australia) Hugh Barter	(Australia) Hugh Barter
4	R1	(Belgium) Circuit de Spa-Francorchamps, Stavelot	29 July	(Australia) Hugh Barter	(Australia) Hugh Barter	(Australia) Hugh Barter
4	R2	(Belgium) Circuit de Spa-Francorchamps, Stavelot	29 July		(Australia) Hugh Barter	(France) Enzo Peugeot
4	R3	(Belgium) Circuit de Spa-Francorchamps, Stavelot	30 July	(Australia) Hugh Barter	(Australia) Hugh Barter	(Australia) Hugh Barter
5	R1	(France) Circuit de Lédenon, Lédenon	10 September	(France) Alessandro Giusti	(Australia) Hugh Barter	(Australia) Hugh Barter
5	R2	(France) Circuit de Lédenon, Lédenon	10 September		(Australia) Hugh Barter	(France) Pierre-Alexandre Provost
5	R3	(France) Circuit de Lédenon, Lédenon	11 September	(France) Alessandro Giusti	(France) Alessandro Giusti	(France) Alessandro Giusti
6	R1	(Spain) Circuit Ricardo Tormo, Cheste	17 September	(France) Alessandro Giusti	(Australia) Hugh Barter	(Australia) Hugh Barter
6	R2	(Spain) Circuit Ricardo Tormo, Cheste	17 September		(France) Enzo Peugeot	(France) Enzo Peugeot
6	R3	(Spain) Circuit Ricardo Tormo, Cheste	18 September	(France) Alessandro Giusti	(Australia) Hugh Barter	(Australia) Hugh Barter
7	R1	(France) Circuit Paul Ricard, Le Castellet	15 October	(France) Alessandro Giusti	(France) Alessandro Giusti	(Japan) Souta Arao
7	R2	(France) Circuit Paul Ricard, Le Castellet	15 October		(Switzerland) Dario Cabanelas	(Colombia) Jerónimo Berrío
7	R3	(France) Circuit Paul Ricard, Le Castellet	16 October	(France) Alessandro Giusti	(Japan) Souta Arao	(France) Alessandro Giusti

== Championship standings ==
Points were awarded as follows:

Races	Position										Bonus	
Races	1st	2nd	3rd	4th	5th	6th	7th	8th	9th	10th	PP	FL
Races 1 & 3	25	18	15	12	10	8	6	4	2	1	**1**	1
Race 2	15	12	10	8	6	4	2	1			–	1

=== Drivers' standings ===
Pos	Driver	NOG (France)			PAU (France)			MAG (France)			SPA (Belgium)			LÉD (France)			CRT (Spain)			LEC (France)			Pts
1	(France) Alessandro Giusti	6	6	3	3	4	3	4	DNS	3	2	9	3	**2**	4	**1**	**2**	5	**2**	**2**	6	**1**	300
2	(Australia) Hugh Barter (Note: Hugh Barter is ineligible to score points in the rounds at Spa-Francorchamps and at the Circuit Ricardo Tormo, as he previously competed at both tracks as part of the F4 Spanish Championship earlier in 2022.)	**1**	7	**1**	1	5	**2**	**1**	20	**1**	**1**	6	**1**	1	2	2	1	4	1	Ret	4	3	241
3	(Japan) Souta Arao	2	9	5	**2**	20†	1	3	5	Ret	4	5	2	3	9	7	3	7	18	1	9	2	227
4	(France) Elliott Vayron	3	8	4	5	15	5	2	14	2	3	7	4	4	3	6	4	3	Ret	8	2	5	202
5	(France) Enzo Peugeot	8	2	13	4	14	17	6	6	7	5	1	11	19	6	4	6	1	5	4	8	6	149
6	(Colombia) Jerónimo Berrío	15	17	16	7	Ret	6	5	3	4	20	3	Ret	Ret	10	11	5	2	19†	6	1	17	103
7	(Japan) Yuto Nomura	7	1	10	Ret	DNS	DNS	9	1	Ret	7	10	6	5	5	Ret	Ret	6	4	9	7	11	100
8	(France) Pierre-Alexandre Provost	4	10	2	Ret	17	7	10	2	Ret	Ret	14	Ret	Ret	1	8	12	Ret	17	3	11	4	95
9	(Switzerland) Dario Cabanelas	11	4	8	6	3	8	24†	8	6	19	8	8	8	8	3	Ret	9	6	19	5	16	90
10	(France) Romain Andriolo	12	14	9	10	1	15	11	17	8	8	2	9	20†	Ret	Ret	9	8	3	7	13	23†	74
11	(France) Louis Pelet	14	19	11	21†	18	DNS	8	7	16	6	13	5	14	Ret	19	7	17†	9	5	3	7	66
12	(Belgium) Lorens Lecertua	9	3	7	13	13	Ret	18	4	9	9	12	7	11	7	9	Ret	11	8	12	Ret	10	51
13	(France) Edgar Pierre	10	11	6	Ret	11	10	7	12	5	10	Ret	Ret	9	17	5	Ret	16	7	13	12	9	50
14	(France) Enzo Géraci	5	5	19	9	8	4	12	11	Ret	11	15	Ret	6	Ret	12	13	Ret	14	15	17	8	44
15	(Germany) Max Reis	13	15	21	8	2	20	14	9	11	21†	11	13	7	Ret	10	15	14	13	10	Ret	21	24
16	(Ecuador) Mateo Villagómez	19	13	24	18	Ret	11	13	16	10	Ret	4	10	12	12	14	16†	Ret	Ret	22†	15	12	11
17	(France) Enzo Richer	17	Ret	18	17	16	13	19	15	18	22†	16	16	16	13	15	8	10	10	14	14	13	8
18	(France) Pablo Sarrazin	18	12	22	11	6	9	15	18	Ret	15	17	17	13	Ret	13	17†	12	11	11	10	20	7
19	(France) Lény Réveillère	16	Ret	12	14	19†	21†	16	23	19†	13	20	12	10	Ret	20	10	Ret	16	16	18	15	3
20	(Panama) Valentino Mini	20	16	15	12	7	18	23†	13	12	14	Ret	Ret	18	14	17	14	13	12	Ret	Ret	14	2
21	(Andorra) Pol López	21	21	20	15	10	12	17	10	17	12	18	14	15	11	16	11	15	Ret	20	16	Ret	1
22	(India) Amir Sayed	22	Ret	14	16	9	16	20	19	15	18	19	15										0
23	(France) Antoine Fernande	24	20	23	20	12	19	22	22	14	16	21	18	17	15	18	18†	Ret	15	21	21	19	0
24	(France) Luciano Morano	23	18	17	19	DSQ	14	21	21	13	17	Ret	19							18	19	18	0
Guest drivers ineligible to score points
–	(United States) Garrett Berry																			17	20	22†	–
Pos	Driver	NOG (France)			PAU (France)			MAG (France)			SPA (Belgium)			LÉD (France)			CRT (Spain)			LEC (France)			Pts

Colour	Result
Gold	Winner
Silver	Second place
Bronze	Third place
Green	Points classification
Blue	Non-points classification
Blue	Non-classified finish (NC)
Purple	Retired, not classified (Ret)
Red	Did not qualify (DNQ)
Red	Did not pre-qualify (DNPQ)
Black	Disqualified (DSQ)
White	Did not start (DNS)
White	Withdrew (WD)
White	Race cancelled (C)
Blank	Did not practice (DNP)
Blank	Did not arrive (DNA)
Blank	Excluded (EX)

**Bold** – Pole
Italics – Fastest Lap
† — Did not finish but classified
