= 2023 Monte Carlo Formula 3 round =

Third round of the 2023 Formula 3 season

(Monaco) 2023 Monte Carlo Formula 3 round
Round details
- Round 3 of 9 in the 2023 FIA Formula 3 Championship.
- Location: Circuit de Monaco; Monte Carlo, Monaco
- Course: Street circuit 3.337 km (2.074 mi)

Sprint race
- Date: 27 May 2023
- Laps: 23
Podium
First	(Spain) Pepe Martí	Campos Racing
Second	(Italy) Leonardo Fornaroli	Trident
Third	(Switzerland) Grégoire Saucy	ART Grand Prix
Fastest lap
Driver	(Australia) Hugh Barter	Campos Racing
- Time: 1:25.678 (on lap 9)

Feature Race
- Date: 28 May 2023
- Laps: 27
Pole position
Driver	(Italy) Gabriele Minì	Hitech Pulse-Eight
Time	1:23.278	
Podium
First	(Italy) Gabriele Minì	Hitech Pulse-Eight
Second	(Sweden) Dino Beganovic	Prema Racing
Third	(Estonia) Paul Aron	Prema Racing
Fastest lap
Driver	(Italy) Gabriele Minì	Hitech Pulse-Eight
- Time: 1:25.165 (on lap 13)

The 2023 Monte Carlo FIA Formula 3 round was a motor racing event held between 25 and 28 May 2023 at the Circuit de Monaco. It was the third round of the 2023 FIA Formula 3 Championship and was held in support of the 2023 Monaco Grand Prix.

== Classification ==
=== Qualifying ===
==== Group A ====
Pos.	No.	Driver	Team	Time	Gap	Grid
1	2	(Sweden) Dino Beganovic	Prema Racing	1:23.880	–	2
2	16	(United Kingdom) Luke Browning	Hitech Pulse-Eight	1:23.883	+0.003	4
3	14	(Colombia) Sebastián Montoya	Hitech Pulse-Eight	1:24.122	+0.242	6
4	10	(Argentina) Franco Colapinto	MP Motorsport	1:24.242	+0.362	8
5	4	(Italy) Leonardo Fornaroli	Trident	1:25.264	+1.384	10
6	8	(Switzerland) Grégoire Saucy	ART Grand Prix	1:25.456	+1.576	12
7	26	(Italy) Nikita Bedrin (Note: Bedrin is a Russian driver competing under an Italian licence.)	Jenzer Motorsport	1:25.742	+1.862	14
8	12	(United Kingdom) Jonny Edgar	MP Motorsport	1:25.749	+1.869	16
9	6	(Germany) Oliver Goethe	Trident	1:25.870	+1.990	18
10	24	(United Kingdom) Christian Mansell (Note: Mansell is an Australian driver competing under a British licence.)	Campos Racing	1:26.055	+2.175	20
11	18	(Mexico) Rafael Villagómez	Van Amersfoort Racing	1:26.141	+2.261	22
12	20	(United Kingdom) Oliver Gray	Rodin Carlin	1:26.542	+2.662	24
13	22	(Israel) Ido Cohen	Rodin Carlin	1:27.041	+3.161	26
14	28	(Mexico) Alex García	Jenzer Motorsport	1:27.147	+3.267	28
15	30	(Brazil) Roberto Faria	PHM Racing by Charouz	1:29.556	+5.676	30

==== Group B ====
Pos.	No.	Driver	Team	Time	Gap	Grid
1	15	(Italy) Gabriele Minì	Hitech Pulse-Eight	1:23.278	–	1
2	1	(Estonia) Paul Aron	Prema Racing	1:24.152	+0.874	3
3	17	(Brazil) Caio Collet	Van Amersfoort Racing	1:24.357	+1.079	5
4	5	(Brazil) Gabriel Bortoleto	Trident	1:24.679	+1.401	7
5	27	(United Kingdom) Taylor Barnard	Jenzer Motorsport	1:24.763	+1.485	9
6	23	(Spain) Pepe Martí	Campos Racing	1:24.770	+1.492	11
7	3	(United Kingdom) Zak O'Sullivan	Prema Racing	1:24.873	+1.595	13
8	9	(Bulgaria) Nikola Tsolov	ART Grand Prix	1:24.911	+1.633	15
9	11	(Spain) Mari Boya	MP Motorsport	1:25.123	+1.845	17
10	19	(Australia) Tommy Smith	Van Amersfoort Racing	1:25.158	+1.880	19
11	25	(Australia) Hugh Barter	Campos Racing	1:25.267	+1.989	21
12	7	(United States) Kaylen Frederick	ART Grand Prix	1:25.888	+2.610	23
13	31	(Poland) Piotr Wiśnicki	PHM Racing by Charouz	1:26.040	+3.161	25
14	21	(United States) Hunter Yeany	Rodin Carlin	1:26.303	+3.025	27
15	29	(Germany) Sophia Flörsch	PHM Racing by Charouz	1:26.390	+3.112	29

=== Sprint race ===
Pos.	No.	Driver	Team	Laps	Time/Gap	Grid	Pts.
1	23	(Spain) Pepe Martí	Campos Racing	23	35:47.957	1	10
2	4	(Italy) Leonardo Fornaroli	Trident	23	+8.123	2	9
3	8	(Switzerland) Grégoire Saucy	ART Grand Prix	23	+8.835	4^{1}	8
4	10	(Argentina) Franco Colapinto	MP Motorsport	23	+9.324	5	7
5	27	(United Kingdom) Taylor Barnard	Jenzer Motorsport	23	+11.589	3	6
6	5	(Brazil) Gabriel Bortoleto	Trident	23	+13.646	6	5
7	14	(Colombia) Sebastián Montoya	Hitech Pulse-Eight	23	+13.946	7	4 (1)
8	16	(United Kingdom) Luke Browning	Hitech Pulse-Eight	23	+14.579	9	3
9	17	(Brazil) Caio Collet	Van Amersfoort Racing	23	+15.985	8	2
10	1	(Estonia) Paul Aron	Prema Racing	23	+17.915	10	1
11	15	(Italy) Gabriele Minì	Hitech Pulse-Eight	23	+18.439	12	
12	2	(Sweden) Dino Beganovic	Prema Racing	23	+19.999	11	
13	3	(United Kingdom) Zak O'Sullivan	Prema Racing	23	+20.939	13	
14	9	(Bulgaria) Nikola Tsolov	ART Grand Prix	23	+22.291	15	
15	26	(Italy) Nikita Bedrin	Jenzer Motorsport	23	+23.258	14	
16	18	(Mexico) Rafael Villagómez	Van Amersfoort Racing	23	+24.028	21	
17	6	(Germany) Oliver Goethe	Trident	23	+35.846	17	
18	31	(Poland) Piotr Wiśnicki	PHM Racing by Charouz	23	+38.467	23	
19	22	(Israel) Ido Cohen	Rodin Carlin	23	+40.369	25	
20	24	(United Kingdom) Christian Mansell	Campos Racing	23	+40.812	19	
21	19	(Australia) Tommy Smith	Van Amersfoort Racing	23	+42.397	18	
22	20	(United Kingdom) Oliver Gray	Rodin Carlin	23	+43.720	22	
23	29	(Germany) Sophia Flörsch	PHM Racing by Charouz	23	+45.145	28	
24	7	(United States) Kaylen Frederick	ART Grand Prix	23	+47.393	29^{3}	
25	25	(Australia) Hugh Barter	Campos Racing	23	+50.076	20	
26	28	(Mexico) Alex García	Jenzer Motorsport	23	+1:01.393	27	
27	21	(United States) Hunter Yeany	Rodin Carlin	20	+3 laps	26	
DNF	12	(United Kingdom) Jonny Edgar	MP Motorsport	0	Collision	16	
DNF	11	(Spain) Mari Boya	MP Motorsport	0	Collision	24^{2} ^{4}	
DNF	30	(Brazil) Roberto Faria	PHM Racing by Charouz	0	Collision	30^{4}	
Fastest lap set by (Australia) Hugh Barter: 1:25.678 (lap 9)

Notes

- ^1 – Grégoire Saucy received a three-place grid drop for Saturday's Sprint race for failing to slow down under yellow flag conditions, demoting him from reverse grid pole down to fourth.
- ^2 – Mari Boya received a three-place grid drop for impeding Zak O'Sullivan during qualifying.
- ^3 - Kaylen Frederick received a ten-place grid drop for causing a collision with Nikola Tsolov during the Melbourne Feature Race.
- ^4 - Mari Boya and Roberto Faria received a five-place grid drop for causing a collision with Nikola Tsolov during the Melbourne Feature Race.

=== Feature race ===
Pos.	No.	Driver	Team	Laps	Time/Gap	Grid	Pts.
1	15	(Italy) Gabriele Minì	Hitech Pulse-Eight	27	41:45.651	1	25 (3)
2	2	(Sweden) Dino Beganovic	Prema Racing	27	+0.452	2	18
3	1	(Estonia) Paul Aron	Prema Racing	27	+7.214	4	15
4	16	(United Kingdom) Luke Browning	Hitech Pulse-Eight	27	+7.563	3	12
5	5	(Brazil) Gabriel Bortoleto	Trident	27	+19.495	8	10
6	10	(Argentina) Franco Colapinto	MP Motorsport	27	+19.900	7	8
7	3	(United Kingdom) Zak O'Sullivan	Prema Racing	27	+20.978	13	6
8	27	(United Kingdom) Taylor Barnard	Jenzer Motorsport	27	+25.764	9	4
9	23	(Spain) Pepe Martí	Campos Racing	27	+26.192	11	2
10	8	(Switzerland) Grégoire Saucy	ART Grand Prix	27	+27.276	12	1
11	9	(Bulgaria) Nikola Tsolov	ART Grand Prix	27	+27.726	15	
12	26	(Italy) Nikita Bedrin	Jenzer Motorsport	27	+28.514	14	
13	6	(Germany) Oliver Goethe	Trident	27	+29.340	18	
14	12	(United Kingdom) Jonny Edgar	MP Motorsport	27	+32.109	15	
15	19	(Australia) Tommy Smith	Van Amersfoort Racing	27	+32.825	19	
16	18	(Mexico) Rafael Villagómez	Van Amersfoort Racing	27	+36.420	22	
17	24	(United Kingdom) Christian Mansell	Campos Racing	27	+39.675	20	
18	11	(Spain) Mari Boya	MP Motorsport	27	+40.818	17	
19	20	(United Kingdom) Oliver Gray	Rodin Carlin	27	+47.339	24	
20	21	(United States) Hunter Yeany	Rodin Carlin	27	+47.869	26	
21	28	(Mexico) Alex García	Jenzer Motorsport	27	+48.867	27	
22	31	(Poland) Piotr Wiśnicki	PHM Racing by Charouz	27	+49.536	PL^{1}	
23	29	(Germany) Sophia Flörsch	PHM Racing by Charouz	27	+50.182	PL^{1}	
24	4	(Italy) Leonardo Fornaroli	Trident	27	+50.570	10	
25	7	(United States) Kaylen Frederick	ART Grand Prix	27	+56.762	23	
26	25	(Australia) Hugh Barter	Campos Racing	27	+1:18.372	21	
27	30	(Brazil) Roberto Faria	PHM Racing by Charouz	27	+1:22.120	PL^{1}	
DNF	17	(Brazil) Caio Collet	Van Amersfoort Racing	17	Collision damage	6	
DNF	22	(Israel) Ido Cohen	Rodin Carlin	0	Accident	25	
DSQ	14	(Colombia) Sebastián Montoya	Hitech Pulse-Eight	26	Disqualified^{2}	5	
Fastest lap set by (Italy) Gabriele Minì: 1:25.165 (lap 13)

Notes

- ^1 – Piotr Wiśnicki, Sophia Flörsch and Roberto Faria all have been required to start from the pit lane after their team were found to have exceeded the total of 11 personnel working on their cars by allowing a representative to scan their tyres after Parc Ferme.
- ^2 – Sebastián Montoya has been penalised twice during the Feature Race. Firstly, he was given a five-second time-penalty for speeding in the pit lane. He later got disqualified after a left tyre was found to have been used on the wrong side of his car following his pit stop.

== Standings after the event ==
Drivers' Championship standings

	Pos.	Driver	Points
	1	(Brazil) Gabriel Bortoleto	73
2	2	(Italy) Gabriele Minì	56
1	3	(Switzerland) Grégoire Saucy	47
1	4	(Sweden) Dino Beganovic	46
2	5	(Estonia) Paul Aron	38

Teams' Championship standings

Pos.	Team	Points
1	(Italy) Trident	124
2	(Italy) Prema Racing	110
3	(United Kingdom) Hitech Pulse-Eight	102
4	(France) ART Grand Prix	54
5	(Spain) Campos Racing	41

- Note: Only the top five positions are included for both sets of standings.

== See also ==
- 2023 Monaco Grand Prix
- 2023 Monte Carlo Formula 2 round

== Notes ==
Previous round: 2023 Melbourne Formula 3 round	FIA Formula 2 Championship; 2023 season	Next round: 2023 Barcelona Formula 3 round
Previous round: 2012 Monaco GP3 Series round	Monte Carlo Formula 3 round	Next round: 2024 Monte Carlo Formula 3 round
