= Roberto Faria =

Brazilian racing driver (born 2004)

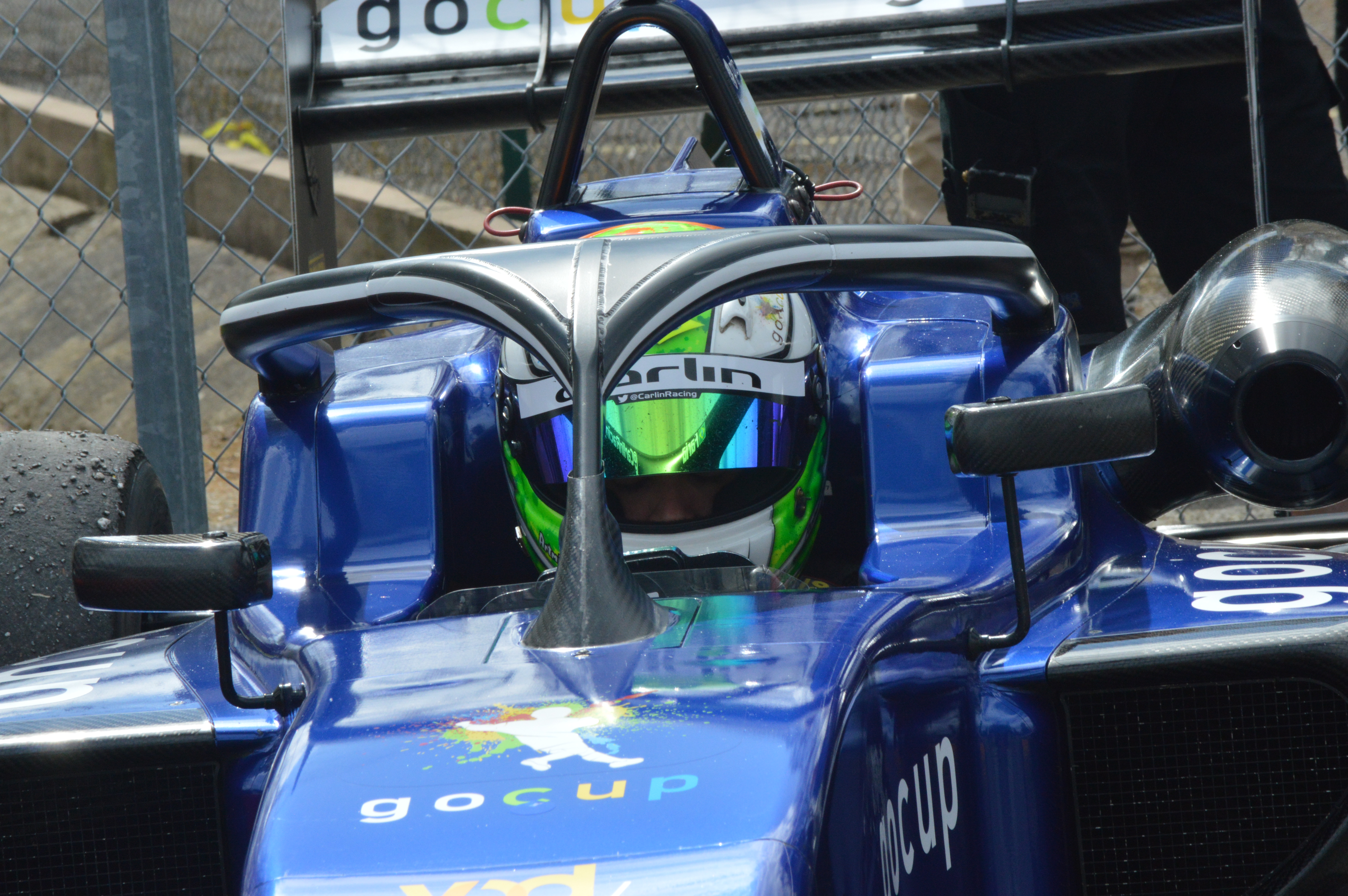
- Faria in 2022
- Nationality: (Brazil) Brazilian
- Born: 15 January 2004 (age 22) Rio de Janeiro, Brazil

FIA Formula 3 Championship career
- Debut season: 2023
- Current team: PHM Racing by Charouz
- Categorisation: FIA Silver
- Car number: 30
- Starts: 18 (18 entries)
- Wins: 0
- Podiums: 0
- Poles: 0
- Fastest laps: 0
- Best finish: 31st in 2023

Previous series
- 2021–22 2021 2019–20: GB3 Championship; F3 Asian Championship; F4 British Championship

Roberto Innocent Faria (born 15 January 2004) is a Brazilian racing driver who last raced in the 2023 FIA Formula 3 Championship with PHM Racing by Charouz. He previously raced in the GB3 Championship with Fortec Motorsports. He was a member of the Sauber Academy.

== Career ==
=== Karting ===
Having begun karting at the age of eleven, Faria soon moved into European competitions, racing in the Karting World Championship in 2017. He would compete for KR Motorsport in 2018, racing in the European and World championships.

=== Lower formulae ===
Faria made his single-seater racing debut in 2019, competing for Fortec Motorsports in the F4 British Championship alongside Mariano Martínez. He would experience a difficult season, scoring a best finish of fourth at Silverstone and finishing eleventh in the standings, one place and fifty points ahead of his teammate.

=== FIA Formula 3 Championship ===
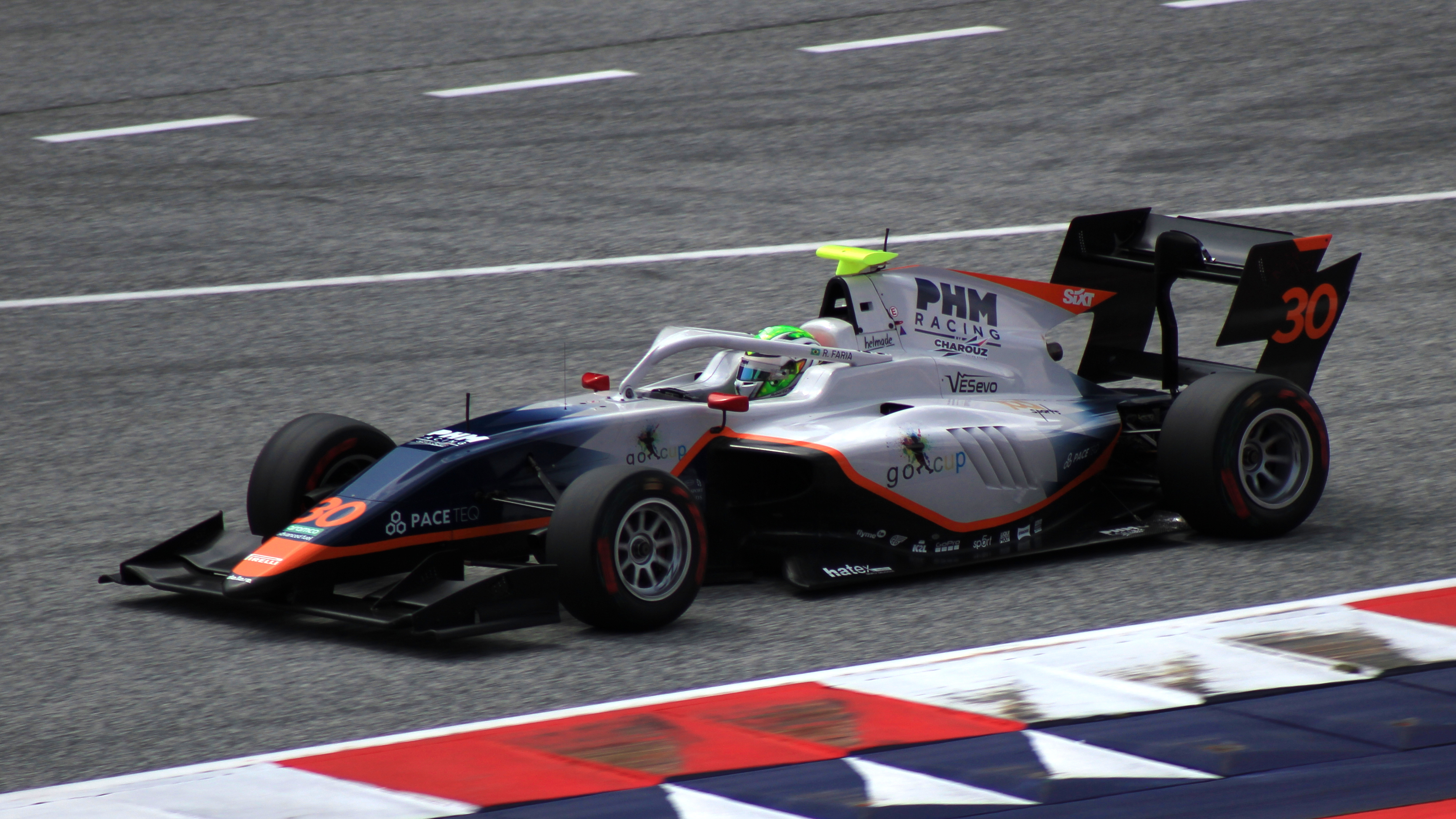
Faria driving the Dallara F3 2019 during the 2023 Spielberg Formula 3 round.

In September 2022, Faria partook in the FIA Formula 3 post-season test with Van Amersfoort Racing during the first day. In February 2023, Faria was announced as a PHM Racing by Charouz driver for the 2023 FIA Formula 3 Championship.

=== Formula One ===
In 2022, Faria became a member of the Sauber Academy.

== Karting record ==
=== Karting career summary ===
Season	Series	Team	Position
2017	CIK-FIA European Championship — OKJ	Chiesa Corse	NC†
2017	CIK-FIA World Championship — OKJ	Chiesa Corse	92nd
2018	WSK Champions Cup — OKJ	TB Racing Team	NC
2018	WSK Super Master Series — OKJ	KR Motorsport Srl	42nd
2018	CIK-FIA European Championship — OKJ	KR Motorsport Srl	51st
2018	CIK-FIA World Championship — OKJ	KR Motorsport Srl	71st

^{†} As Faria was a guest driver, he was ineligible to score points.

== Racing record ==
=== Racing career summary ===
Season	Series	Team	Races	Wins	Poles	F/Laps	Podiums	Points	Position
2019	F4 British Championship	Fortec Motorsports	30	0	0	0	0	99	11th
2020	F4 British Championship	Fortec Motorsports	15	0	1	0	2	106	10th
2020	BRDC British Formula 3 Championship	Fortec Motorsports	13	0	0	0	1	152	14th
2021	GB3 Championship	Fortec Motorsports	24	1	0	3	9	360	5th
2021	F3 Asian Championship	Motorscape	15	0	0	0	0	6	17th
2022	GB3 Championship	Carlin	24	0	0	3	6	316.5	5th
2023	FIA Formula 3 Championship	PHM Racing by Charouz	18	0	0	0	0	0	32nd
2024	GT4 Winter Series	RACAR Motorsport	6	0	0	2	3	58	9th
2024	Ultimate Cup Series - GT Sprint Cup - UCS4	RACAR Motorsport	2	2	2	2	2	32	7th
2024	GT4 European Series - Silver	GPA Racing							
2024	GT4 European Series - Silver	Racing Spirit of Léman							
2025	GT4 European Series - Silver	Mirage Racing							
2025	Supercars Endurance Series - GT4	Racar Motorsport							
2026	GT4 European Series - Silver	Mirage Racing							

^{*} Season still in progress.

=== Complete F4 British Championship results ===
(key) (Races in bold indicate pole position) (Races in italics indicate fastest lap)

Year	Team	1	2	3	4	5	6	7	8	9	10	11	12	13	14	15	16	17	18	19	20	21	22	23	24	25	26	27	28	29	30	DC	Points
2019	Fortec Motorsports	BHI; 1; 10	BHI; 2; 5	BHI; 3; 8	DON; 1; 6	DON; 2 DNS	DON; 3; 10	THR1; 1; 8	THR1; 2; 6	THR1; 3; 13	CRO; 1; 8	CRO; 2; 8	CRO; 3; 10	OUL; 1; 9	OUL; 2; 11	OUL; 3 Ret	SNE; 1; 7	SNE; 2; 6	SNE; 3; 11	THR2; 1; 10	THR2; 2; 7	THR2; 3; 10	KNO; 1; 5	KNO; 2; 11	KNO; 3; 11	SIL; 1; 9	SIL; 2; 4	SIL; 3; 7	BHGP; 1 Ret	BHGP; 2 Ret	BHGP; 3; 9	11th	99
2020	Fortec Motorsports	DON; 1; 3	DON; 2 Ret	**DON**; **3**; 4	BHGP; 1; 5	BHGP; 2; 2	BHGP; 3; 4	OUL; 1; 14	OUL; 2; 7	OUL; 3; 4	KNO; 1; 7	KNO; 2 Ret	KNO; 3; 6	THR; 1	THR; 2	THR; 3	SIL; 1	SIL; 2	SIL; 3	CRO; 1	CRO; 2	SNE; 1	SNE; 2	SNE; 3	BHI; 1; 10	BHI; 2 Ret	BHI; 3; 4					10th	106

=== Complete BRDC British F3/GB3 Championship results ===
(key) (Races in bold indicate pole position) (Races in italics indicate fastest lap)

Year	Entrant	1	2	3	4	5	6	7	8	9	10	11	12	13	14	15	16	17	18	19	20	21	22	23	24	DC	Points
2020	Fortec Motorsports	OUL; 1	OUL; 2	OUL; 3	OUL; 4	DON1; 1	DON1; 2	DON1; 3	BRH; 1	BRH; 2	BRH; 3	BRH; 4	DON2; 1; 16	DON2; 2; 5	DON2; 3; 12	SNE; 1; 12	SNE; 2; 18	SNE; 3; 12	SNE; 4; 15	DON3; 1; 5	DON3; 2; 8	DON3; 3; 9	SIL; 1; 4	SIL; 2; 8^{6}	SIL; 3; 2	14th	152
2021	Fortec Motorsports	BRH; 1 Ret	BRH; 2; 6	BRH; 3; 12^{4}	SIL; 1; 5	SIL; 2; 3	SIL; 3; 3^{7}	DON1; 1; 14	DON1; 2; 3	DON1; 3; 13	SPA; 1; 12	SPA; 2; 9	SPA; 3; 1^{3}	SNE; 1; 2	SNE; 2; 8	SNE; 3; 3^{5}	SIL2; 1; 2	SIL2; 2; 3	SIL2; 3 Ret	OUL; 1; 3	OUL; 2 Ret	OUL; 3; 10^{3}	DON2; 1; 12	DON2; 2; 10	DON2; 3; 4^{11}	5th	360
2022	Carlin	OUL; 1; 2	OUL; 2; 2	OUL; 3; 14^{3}	SIL1; 1; 7	SIL1; 2; 6	SIL1; 3 Ret	DON1; 1; 2	DON1; 2; 5	DON1; 3; 20	SNE; 1; 4	SNE; 2; 7	SNE; 3; 14^{4}	SPA; 1; 11	SPA; 2 Ret	SPA; 3; 4	SIL2; 1; 3	SIL2; 2; 5	SIL2; 3; 2^{11}	BRH; 1; 18	BRH; 2; 9	BRH; 3; 3^{1}	DON2; 1 Ret	DON2; 2; 14	DON2; 3; 15	5th	316.5

=== Complete F3 Asian Championship results ===
(key) (Races in bold indicate pole position) (Races in italics indicate fastest lap)

Year	Entrant	1	2	3	4	5	6	7	8	9	10	11	12	13	14	15	DC	Points
2021	Motorscape	DUB; 1; 11	DUB; 2; 15	DUB; 3; 19	ABU; 1; 16	ABU; 2; 20	ABU; 3; 9	ABU; 1; 11	ABU; 2; 9	ABU; 3; 17	DUB; 1; 16	DUB; 2 Ret	DUB; 3; 9	ABU; 1 Ret	ABU; 2; 11	ABU; 2 Ret	18th	6

^{†} Driver did not finish the race, but was classified as they completed over 75% of the race distance.

=== Complete FIA Formula 3 Championship results ===
(key) (Races in bold indicate pole position) (Races in italics indicate fastest lap)

Year	Entrant	1	2	3	4	5	6	7	8	9	10	11	12	13	14	15	16	17	18	DC	Points
2023	PHM Racing by Charouz	BHR; SPR; 24	BHR; FEA; 25	MEL; SPR; 18	MEL; FEA; Ret	MON; SPR; Ret	MON; FEA; 27	CAT; SPR; 25	CAT; FEA; 24	RBR; SPR; 24	RBR; FEA; 19	SIL; SPR; 27	SIL; FEA; Ret	HUN; SPR; 19	HUN; FEA; 20	SPA; SPR; 17	SPA; FEA; Ret	MNZ; SPR; NC	MNZ; FEA; 22†	31st	0

=== Complete GT4 European Series results ===
(key) (Races in bold indicate pole position) (Races in italics indicate fastest lap)

Year	Team	Car	Class	1	2	3	4	5	6	7	8	9	10	11	12	Pos	Points
2024	GPA Racing	Aston Martin Vantage AMR GT4	Silver	LEC; 1; 32†	LEC; 2; 7	MIS; 1; 26	MIS; 2; 22									22nd	6
2024	Racing Spirit of Léman	Aston Martin Vantage AMR GT4 Evo	Silver					SPA; 1; 27	SPA; 2; 30	HOC; 1 Ret	HOC; 2; 41†	MNZ; 1 DNS	MNZ; 2 WD	JED; 1	JED; 2	22nd	6
2025	Mirage Racing	Aston Martin Vantage AMR GT4 Evo	Silver	LEC; 1; 8	LEC; 2; 10	ZAN; 1; 7	ZAN; 2 Ret	SPA; 1; 11	SPA; 2; 9	MIS; 1; 11	MIS; 2; 18	NÜR; 1	NÜR; 2	CAT; 1	CAT; 2	12th*	16*
