= 2023 Spa-Francorchamps Formula 3 round =

(Belgium) 2023 Spa-Francorchamps Formula 3 round
Round details
- Round 8 of 9 in the 2023 FIA Formula 3 Championship.
- Layout of the Circuit de Spa-Francorchamps
- Location: Circuit de Spa-Francorchamps, Stavelot, Belgium
- Course: Permanent racing facility 7.004 km (4.352 mi)

Sprint Race
- Date: 29 July 2023
- Laps: 12 (Note: Sprint race has been shortened from 15 to 12 laps and feature race has been shortened from 18 to 15 laps due to too high tyre wear.)
Podium
First	(Brazil) Caio Collet	Van Amersfoort Racing
Second	(United Kingdom) Taylor Barnard	Jenzer Motorsport
Third	(Estonia) Paul Aron	Prema Racing
Fastest lap
Driver	(Brazil) Caio Collet	Van Amersfoort Racing
- Time: 2:14.585 (on lap 8)

Feature Race
- Date: 30 July 2023
- Laps: 15
Pole position
Driver	(Spain) Pepe Martí	Campos Racing
Time	2:22.160	
Podium
First	(United Kingdom) Taylor Barnard	Jenzer Motorsport
Second	(United Kingdom) Christian Mansell	Campos Racing
Third	(Italy) Nikita Bedrin	Jenzer Motorsport
Fastest lap
Driver	(Switzerland) Grégoire Saucy	ART Grand Prix
- Time: 2:18.289 (on lap 15)

The 2023 Spa-Francorchamps Formula 3 round was a motor racing event held between 28 and 30 July 2023 at the Circuit de Spa-Francorchamps, Stavelot, Belgium. It was the penultimate race of the 2023 FIA Formula 3 Championship, and was held in support of the 2023 Belgian Grand Prix.

== Driver changes ==
Prior to the round at the Spa-Francorchamps, Rodin Carlin announced that Euroformula Open racer Francesco Simonazzi had taken over Max Esterson's seat for the rest of the season.

== Classification ==
=== Qualifying ===
Pos.	No.	Driver	Team	Time/Gap	R1	R2
1	23	(Spain) Pepe Martí	Campos Racing	2:22.160	12	1
2	4	(Italy) Leonardo Fornaroli	Trident	+0.016	11	2
3	15	(Italy) Gabriele Minì	Hitech Pulse-Eight	+0.094	10	8^{1}
4	10	(Argentina) Franco Colapinto	MP Motorsport	+0.242	9	3
5	9	(Bulgaria) Nikola Tsolov	ART Grand Prix	+0.357	8	4
6	3	(United Kingdom) Zak O'Sullivan	Prema Racing	+0.391	7	5
7	2	(Sweden) Dino Beganovic	Prema Racing	+0.562	6	6
8	12	(United Kingdom) Jonny Edgar	MP Motorsport	+0.579	5	7
9	17	(Brazil) Caio Collet	Van Amersfoort Racing	+0.632	4	9
10	27	(United Kingdom) Taylor Barnard	Jenzer Motorsport	+0.656	3	10
11	1	(Estonia) Paul Aron	Prema Racing	+0.782	2	11
12	25	(Australia) Hugh Barter	Campos Racing	+0.944	1	12
13	16	(United Kingdom) Luke Browning	Hitech Pulse-Eight	+0.983	13	13
14	11	(Spain) Mari Boya	MP Motorsport	+1.015	14	14
15	5	(Brazil) Gabriel Bortoleto	Trident	+1.091	15	15
16	8	(Switzerland) Grégoire Saucy	ART Grand Prix	+1.185	16	16
17	7	(United States) Kaylen Frederick	ART Grand Prix	+1.275	17	17
18	26	(Italy) Nikita Bedrin (Note: Bedrin is a Russian driver competing under an Italian licence.)	Jenzer Motorsport	+1.754	18	18
19	18	(Mexico) Rafael Villagómez	Van Amersfoort Racing	+1.785	19	19
20	19	(Australia) Tommy Smith	Van Amersfoort Racing	+1.815	20	20
21	14	(Colombia) Sebastián Montoya	Hitech Pulse-Eight	+1.846	21	21
22	28	(Mexico) Alex García	Jenzer Motorsport	+2.116	22	22
23	24	(Australia) Christian Mansell (Note: Mansell is an Australian driver who competed under a British licence in rounds 1–6 and an Australian licence in rounds 7–9.)	Campos Racing	+2.174	23	23
24	29	(Germany) Sophia Flörsch	PHM Racing by Charouz	+2.792	24	24
25	20	(United Kingdom) Oliver Gray	Rodin Carlin	+2.859	25	25
26	22	(Israel) Ido Cohen	Rodin Carlin	+3.572	26	26
27	6	(Germany) Oliver Goethe	Trident	+3.978	27	27
28	31	(South Korea) Woohyun Shin	PHM Racing by Charouz	+4.160	28	28
29	21	(Italy) Francesco Simonazzi	Rodin Carlin	+4.207	29	29
30	30	(Brazil) Roberto Faria	PHM Racing by Charouz	+4.650	30	30

Notes:

- ^1 - Gabriele Minì received a 5-place grid penalty for the feature race for causing a collision with Pepe Martí in the sprint race.

=== Sprint Race ===
No points were awarded after this race as there was no two consecutive laps under green flag. However, prior to the evening full points were awarded to all drivers, who finished in top 10 as all 12 racing laps were completed.

Pos.	No.	Driver	Team	Laps	Time/Gap	Grid	Pts.
1	17	(Brazil) Caio Collet	Van Amersfoort Racing	12	36:16.106	4	10 (1)
2	27	(United Kingdom) Taylor Barnard	Jenzer Motorsport	12	+0.559	3	9
3	1	(Estonia) Paul Aron	Prema Racing	12	+0.998	2	8
4	12	(United Kingdom) Jonny Edgar	MP Motorsport	12	+1.536	5	7
5	10	(Argentina) Franco Colapinto	MP Motorsport	12	+1.689	9	6
6	25	(Australia) Hugh Barter	Campos Racing	12	+2.206	1	5
7	9	(Bulgaria) Nikola Tsolov	ART Grand Prix	12	+2.512	8	4
8	16	(United Kingdom) Luke Browning	Hitech Pulse-Eight	12	+3.382	13	3
9	4	(Italy) Leonardo Fornaroli	Trident	12	+3.538	11	2
10	8	(Switzerland) Grégoire Saucy	ART Grand Prix	12	+4.446	16	1
11	26	(Italy) Nikita Bedrin	Jenzer Motorsport	12	+4.728	18	
12	29	(Germany) Sophia Flörsch	PHM Racing by Charouz	12	+5.352	24	
13	7	(United States) Kaylen Frederick	ART Grand Prix	12	+5.642	17	
14	21	(Italy) Francesco Simonazzi	Rodin Carlin	12	+6.206	29	
15	3	(United Kingdom) Zak O'Sullivan	Prema Racing	12	+6.316^{1}	7	
16	11	(Spain) Mari Boya	MP Motorsport	12	+6.528	14	
17	30	(Brazil) Roberto Faria	PHM Racing by Charouz	12	+7.623	30	
18	28	(Mexico) Alex García	Jenzer Motorsport	12	+10.371	22	
19	24	(Australia) Christian Mansell	Campos Racing	12	+11.889	23	
20	20	(United Kingdom) Oliver Gray	Rodin Carlin	12	+12.672	25	
21	31	(South Korea) Woohyun Shin	PHM Racing by Charouz	12	+13.135	28	
22	2	(Sweden) Dino Beganovic	Prema Racing	12	+13.242^{2}	6	
23	18	(Mexico) Rafael Villagómez	Van Amersfoort Racing	12	+18.848^{3}	19	
24	19	(Australia) Tommy Smith	Van Amersfoort Racing	12	+20.833^{4}	20	
DNF	5	(Brazil) Gabriel Bortoleto	Trident	8	Collision/Puncture	15	
DNF	15	(Italy) Gabriele Minì	Hitech Pulse-Eight	3	Collision	10	
DNF	23	(Spain) Pepe Martí	Campos Racing	3	Collision	12	
DNF	22	(Israel) Ido Cohen	Rodin Carlin	3	Collision	26	
DNF	6	(Germany) Oliver Goethe	Trident	3	Suspension	27	
DNF	14	(Colombia) Sebastián Montoya	Hitech Pulse-Eight	0	Collision	21	
Fastest lap set by (Brazil) Caio Collet: 2:14.585 (lap 8)

Notes:

- ^1 - Zak O'Sullivan received a 5-second time penalty for overtaking Hugh Barter off track.
- ^2 - Dino Beganovic received a 10-second time penalty for causing a collision with Gabriel Bortoleto.
- ^3 - Rafael Villagómez received a 10-second time penalty for causing a collision with Sebastián Montoya.
- ^4 - Tommy Smith received a 10-second time penalty for causing a collision with Oliver Goethe.

=== Feature Race ===
Pos.	No.	Driver	Team	Laps	Time/Gap	Grid	Pts.
1	27	(United Kingdom) Taylor Barnard	Jenzer Motorsport	15	39:50.104	10	25
2	24	(Australia) Christian Mansell	Campos Racing	15	+1.529	23	18
3	26	(Italy) Nikita Bedrin	Jenzer Motorsport	15	+7.703	18	15
4	28	(Mexico) Alex García	Jenzer Motorsport	15	+8.915	22	12
5	17	(Brazil) Caio Collet	Van Amersfoort Racing	15	+20.053	9	10
6	14	(Colombia) Sebastián Montoya	Hitech Pulse-Eight	15	+20.172	21	8
7	29	(Germany) Sophia Flörsch	PHM Racing by Charouz	15	+20.533	24	6
8	1	(Estonia) Paul Aron	Prema Racing	15	+28.760	11	4
9	23	(Spain) Pepe Martí	Campos Racing	15	+30.172	1	2 (3)
10	10	(Argentina) Franco Colapinto	MP Motorsport	15	+31.547	3	1
11	5	(Brazil) Gabriel Bortoleto	Trident	15	+32.595	15	
12	3	(United Kingdom) Zak O'Sullivan	Prema Racing	15	+33.068	5	
13	11	(Spain) Mari Boya	MP Motorsport	15	+34.910	14	
14	4	(Italy) Leonardo Fornaroli	Trident	15	+35.731	2	
15	7	(United States) Kaylen Frederick	ART Grand Prix	15	+35.959	17	
16	2	(Sweden) Dino Beganovic	Prema Racing	15	+37.752	6	
17	9	(Bulgaria) Nikola Tsolov	ART Grand Prix	15	+40.127	9	
18	19	(Australia) Tommy Smith	Van Amersfoort Racing	15	+43.351	20	
19	12	(United Kingdom) Jonny Edgar	MP Motorsport	15	+45.093	7	
20	8	(Switzerland) Grégoire Saucy	ART Grand Prix	15	+45.875	16	
21	18	(Mexico) Rafael Villagómez	Van Amersfoort Racing	15	+51.388	19	
22	25	(Australia) Hugh Barter	Campos Racing	15	+1:09.043	12	
23	16	(United Kingdom) Luke Browning	Hitech Pulse-Eight	15	+1:48.817^{1}	13	
24	21	(Italy) Francesco Simonazzi	Rodin Carlin	15	+2:17.172^{2}	29	
25	31	(South Korea) Woohyun Shin	PHM Racing by Charouz	14	+1 lap	28	
DNF	20	(United Kingdom) Oliver Gray	Rodin Carlin	12	Collision damage	25	
DNF	22	(Israel) Ido Cohen	Rodin Carlin	12	Puncture damage	26	
DNF	30	(Brazil) Roberto Faria	PHM Racing by Charouz	4	Spun off	30	
DNF	6	(Germany) Oliver Goethe	Trident	3	Accident	27	
DNS	15	(Italy) Gabriele Minì	Hitech Pulse-Eight	–	Did not start^{3}	8	
Fastest lap set by (Switzerland) Grégoire Saucy: 2:18.289 (lap 15)

Notes:

- ^1 - Luke Browning received a 10-second time penalty for causing a collision with Ido Cohen.
- ^2 - Francesco Simonazzi received a 30-second time penalty for his mechanics leaving the starting grid too late.
- ^3 – Gabriele Minì crashed out on the sighting lap and was therefore unable to start the race.

== Standings after the event ==
Drivers' Championship standings

	Pos.	Driver	Points
	1	(Brazil) Gabriel Bortoleto	144
2	2	(Estonia) Paul Aron	106
	3	(Spain) Pepe Martí	105
2	4	(United Kingdom) Zak O'Sullivan	101
1	5	(Argentina) Franco Colapinto	100

Teams' Championship standings

	Pos.	Team	Points
	1	(Italy) Prema Racing	301
	2	(Italy) Trident	276
1	3	(Spain) Campos Racing	171
1	4	(United Kingdom) Hitech Pulse-Eight	165
	5	(Netherlands) MP Motorsport	143

- Note: Only the top five positions are included for both sets of standings

== See also ==
- 2023 Belgian Grand Prix
- 2023 Spa-Francorchamps Formula 2 round

== Notes ==
Previous round: 2023 Budapest Formula 3 round	FIA Formula 3 Championship; 2023 season	Next round: 2023 Monza Formula 3 round
Previous round: 2022 Spa-Francorchamps Formula 3 round	Spa-Francorchamps Formula 3 round	Next round: 2024 Spa-Francorchamps Formula 3 round
