= 2023 Melbourne Formula 3 round =

Second round of the 2023 Formula 3 season

(Australia) 2023 Melbourne Formula 3 round
Round details
- Round 2 of 9 in the 2023 FIA Formula 3 Championship.
- Location: Albert Park Circuit; Melbourne, Australia
- Course: Temporary street circuit 5.278 km (3.280 mi)

Sprint race
- Date: 1 April 2023
- Laps: 20
Podium
First	(United Kingdom) Zak O'Sullivan	Prema Racing
Second	(Colombia) Sebastián Montoya	Hitech Pulse-Eight
Third	(Estonia) Paul Aron	Prema Racing
Fastest lap
Driver	(United Kingdom) Luke Browning	Hitech Pulse-Eight
- Time: 1:34.880 (on lap 18)

Feature Race
- Date: 2 April 2023
- Laps: 23
Pole position
Driver	(Brazil) Gabriel Bortoleto	Trident
Time	1:33.025	
Podium
First	(Brazil) Gabriel Bortoleto	Trident
Second	(Switzerland) Grégoire Saucy	ART Grand Prix
Third	(Italy) Gabriele Minì	Hitech Pulse-Eight
Fastest lap
Driver	(Switzerland) Grégoire Saucy	ART Grand Prix
- Time: 1:34.405 (on 17)

The 2023 Melbourne FIA Formula 3 round was a motor racing event held between 31 March and 2 April 2023 at the Albert Park Circuit. It was the second round of the 2023 FIA Formula 3 Championship and was held in support of the 2023 Australian Grand Prix.

Franco Colapinto won the sprint race behind the safety car, in which resulted as a 1-2 finish for the Williams Academy. However, Colapinto, and his two teammates, Mari Boya and Jonny Edgar, have all been disqualified from the sprint as it was found the suspension keels on all three MP Motorsport cars did not conform to regulations.

As a result, Zak O'Sullivan inherited the win and Luke Browning was credited with the fastest lap. However, ninth-placed finisher Christian Mansell received the fastest lap point as he posted the fastest lap among the drivers classified among the top ten.

== Classification ==
=== Qualifying ===
Pos.	No.	Driver	Team	Time/Gap	Grid SR	Grid FR
1	5	(Brazil) Gabriel Bortoleto	Trident	1:33.025	12	1
2	8	(Switzerland) Grégoire Saucy	ART Grand Prix	+0.171	11	2
3	15	(Italy) Gabriele Minì	Hitech Pulse-Eight	+0.282	10	3
4	4	(Italy) Leonardo Fornaroli	Trident	+0.345	9	4
5	3	(United Kingdom) Zak O'Sullivan	Prema Racing	+0.348	8	5
6	1	(Estonia) Paul Aron	Prema Racing	+0.383	7	6
7	10	(Argentina) Franco Colapinto	MP Motorsport	+0.563	6	7
8	2	(Sweden) Dino Beganovic	Prema Racing	+0.579	5	8
9	16	(United Kingdom) Luke Browning	Hitech Pulse-Eight	+0.740	4	9
10	17	(Brazil) Caio Collet	Van Amersfoort Racing	+0.851	3	10
11	6	(Germany) Oliver Goethe	Trident	+0.992	2	11
12	14	(Colombia) Sebastián Montoya	Hitech Pulse-Eight	+1.069	1	12
13	24	(United Kingdom) Christian Mansell (Note: Mansell is an Australian driver competing under a British licence.)	Campos Racing	+1.202	13	13
14	12	(United Kingdom) Jonny Edgar	MP Motorsport	+1.251	14	14
15	9	(Bulgaria) Nikola Tsolov	ART Grand Prix	+1.265	15	15
16	11	(Spain) Mari Boya	MP Motorsport	+1.301	16	16
17	7	(United States) Kaylen Frederick	ART Grand Prix	+1.339	17	17
18	27	(United Kingdom) Taylor Barnard	Jenzer Motorsport	+1.369	18	18
19	18	(Mexico) Rafael Villagómez	Van Amersfoort Racing	+1.521	19	19
20	26	(Italy) Nikita Bedrin (Note: Bedrin is a Russian driver competing under an Italian licence.)	Jenzer Motorsport	+1.743	20	20
21	20	(United Kingdom) Oliver Gray	Rodin Carlin	+2.077	21	21
22	25	(Australia) Hugh Barter	Campos Racing	+2.108	22	22
23	22	(Israel) Ido Cohen	Rodin Carlin	+2.334	23	28
24	29	(Germany) Sophia Flörsch	PHM Racing by Charouz	+2.494	24	23
25	30	(Brazil) Roberto Faria	PHM Racing by Charouz	+2.663	25	24
26	21	(United States) Hunter Yeany	Rodin Carlin	+2.755^{1}	29^{1}	25
27	31	(Poland) Piotr Wiśnicki	PHM Racing by Charouz	+2.994	26	26
28	19	(Australia) Tommy Smith	Van Amersfoort Racing	+3.289	28^{2}	27
29	28	(Mexico) Alex García	Jenzer Motorsport	+3.571	27	29
107% time: 1:39.536 (+6.511)
—	23	(Spain) Pepe Martí	Campos Racing	No time set	30^{3}	30^{3}

Notes:

- ^1 – Hunter Yeany originally qualified 22nd by setting a lap time of 1:35.132, but was given a 10-place grid drop for Saturday's Sprint Race and his time was deleted as he was found to be significantly speeding under double yellow flag conditions while setting his fastest lap time. As a result, the penalty dropped him to P26 in the final classification and to P29 for the Sprint Race.
- ^2 – Tommy Smith originally qualified 28th, but was given a carrying penalty from the Sakhir Feature Race for his involvement in two incidents. For both, he was assigned a three-place grid drop and a ten-second time-penalty, with the latter being converted into another three-place grid drop. However, the penalty will not have any effect of his grid position as Yeany got penalised and Pepe Martí did not set a time during qualifying.
- ^3 – Pepe Martí failed to set any valid time after crashing at the opening stages of qualifying, but was later given permission to start both races from the back of the grid.

=== Sprint race ===
Pos.	No.	Driver	Team	Laps	Time/Gap	Grid	Pts.
1	3	(United Kingdom) Zak O'Sullivan	Prema Racing	20	42:06.098	8	10
2	14	(Colombia) Sebastián Montoya	Hitech Pulse-Eight	20	+0.219	1	9
3	1	(Estonia) Paul Aron	Prema Racing	20	+0.593	7	8
4	15	(Italy) Gabriele Minì	Hitech Pulse-Eight	20	+0.778	10	7
5	2	(Sweden) Dino Beganovic	Prema Racing	20	+1.369	5	6
6	5	(Brazil) Gabriel Bortoleto	Trident	20	+1.542	12	5
7	4	(Italy) Leonardo Fornaroli	Trident	20	+1.969	9	4
8	8	(Switzerland) Grégoire Saucy	ART Grand Prix	20	+3.498	6	3
9	24	(United Kingdom) Christian Mansell	Campos Racing	20	+7.327	13	2 (1)
10	7	(United States) Kaylen Frederick	ART Grand Prix	20	+8.523	17	1
11	9	(Bulgaria) Nikola Tsolov	ART Grand Prix	20	+8.816	15	
12	27	(United Kingdom) Taylor Barnard	Jenzer Motorsport	20	+9.913	18	
13	23	(Spain) Pepe Martí	Campos Racing	20	+11.009	30	
14	18	(Mexico) Rafael Villagómez	Van Amersfoort Racing	20	+13.025	19	
15	26	(Italy) Nikita Bedrin	Jenzer Motorsport	20	+13.136	20	
16	29	(Germany) Sophia Flörsch	PHM Racing by Charouz	20	+14.102	24	
17	16	(United Kingdom) Luke Browning	Hitech Pulse-Eight	20	+15.112	4	
18	30	(Brazil) Roberto Faria	PHM Racing by Charouz	20	+15.813	25	
19	25	(Australia) Hugh Barter	Campos Racing	20	+16.332	22	
20	20	(United Kingdom) Oliver Gray	Rodin Carlin	20	+17.662	21	
21	17	(Brazil) Caio Collet	Van Amersfoort Racing	20	+18.802	3	
22	21	(United States) Hunter Yeany	Rodin Carlin	20	+19.981	29	
23	31	(Poland) Piotr Wiśnicki	PHM Racing by Charouz	20	+20.545	26	
DNF	28	(Mexico) Alex García	Jenzer Motorsport	17	Accident	27	
DNF	19	(Australia) Tommy Smith	Van Amersfoort Racing	12	Accident	22	
DNF	22	(Israel) Ido Cohen	Rodin Carlin	5	Collision damage	23	
DNF	6	(Germany) Oliver Goethe	Trident	0	Puncture damage	2	
DSQ	10	(Argentina) Franco Colapinto	MP Motorsport	20	Disqualified^{1}	6	
DSQ	11	(Spain) Mari Boya	MP Motorsport	20	Disqualified^{1}	16	
DSQ	12	(United Kingdom) Jonny Edgar	MP Motorsport	20	Disqualified^{1}	14	
Fastest lap set by (United Kingdom) Luke Browning: 1:34.880 (lap 18)

Notes

- ^1 – Franco Colapinto, Mari Boya and Jonny Edgar all have been disqualified from the Sprint Race as it was found the suspension keels on all three MP Motorsport cars did not conform to regulations. Colapinto had finished the race in first place, so following his disqualification Zak O'Sullivan inherited the win and Luke Browning was credited with the fastest lap. However, Christian Mansell received the fastest lap point as he posted the fastest lap among the drivers classified among the top ten.

=== Feature race ===
Pos.	No.	Driver	Team	Laps	Time/Gap	Grid	Pts.
1	5	(Brazil) Gabriel Bortoleto	Trident	23	43:41.950	1	25 (2)
2	8	(Switzerland) Grégoire Saucy	ART Grand Prix	23	+0.596	2	18 (1)
3	15	(Italy) Gabriele Minì	Hitech Pulse-Eight	23	+3.032	3	15
4	4	(Italy) Leonardo Fornaroli	Trident	23	+3.216	4	12
5	3	(United Kingdom) Zak O'Sullivan	Prema Racing	23	+3.564	5	10
6	1	(Estonia) Paul Aron	Prema Racing	23	+4.393	6	8
7	23	(Spain) Pepe Martí	Campos Racing	23	+8.738	30	6
8	16	(United Kingdom) Luke Browning	Hitech Pulse-Eight	23	+9.191^{1}	9	4
9	27	(United Kingdom) Taylor Barnard	Jenzer Motorsport	23	+13.589	18	2
10	24	(United Kingdom) Christian Mansell	Campos Racing	23	+14.356	13	1
11	12	(United Kingdom) Jonny Edgar	MP Motorsport	23	+14.928	14	
12	19	(Australia) Tommy Smith	Van Amersfoort Racing	23	+15.582	27	
13	2	(Sweden) Dino Beganovic	Prema Racing	23	+18.557^{2}	8	
14	20	(United Kingdom) Oliver Gray	Rodin Carlin	23	+18.766	21	
15	25	(Australia) Hugh Barter	Campos Racing	23	+19.034	22	
16	17	(Brazil) Caio Collet	Van Amersfoort Racing	23	+19.426	10	
17	21	(United States) Hunter Yeany	Rodin Carlin	23	+19.645	25	
18	29	(Germany) Sophia Flörsch	PHM Racing by Charouz	23	+23.606	23	
19	18	(Mexico) Rafael Villagómez	Van Amersfoort Racing	23	+28.676	19	
20	28	(Mexico) Alex García	Jenzer Motorsport	23	+30.035	29	
21	9	(Bulgaria) Nikola Tsolov	ART Grand Prix	23	+30.064	15	
22	6	(Germany) Oliver Goethe	Trident	23	+56.084	11	
23^{3}	26	(Italy) Nikita Bedrin	Jenzer Motorsport	22	Accident	20	
DNF	22	(Israel) Ido Cohen	Rodin Carlin	11	Collision damage	28	
DNF	30	(Brazil) Roberto Faria	PHM Racing by Charouz	8	Collision	24	
DNF	31	(Poland) Piotr Wiśnicki	PHM Racing by Charouz	6	Accident	26	
DNF	7	(United States) Kaylen Frederick	ART Grand Prix	4	Collision damage	17	
DNF	10	(Argentina) Franco Colapinto	MP Motorsport	1	Collision	7	
DNF	11	(Spain) Mari Boya	MP Motorsport	1	Accident	16	
DNF	14	(Colombia) Sebastián Montoya	Hitech Pulse-Eight	0	Collision damage	12	
Fastest lap set by (Switzerland) Grégoire Saucy: 1:34.405 (lap 17)

Notes

- ^1 – Luke Browning originally finished sixth, but was later given a five-second penalty for causing a collision with Franco Colapinto, dropping him down to eighth.
- ^2 – Dino Beganovic originally finished eighth, but was later given a ten-second time-penalty for causing a collision with Caio Collet, dropping him out of the points in thirteenth.
- ^3 – Nikita Bedrin retired from the race, but was classified as he completed over 90% of the race distance.

== Standings after the event ==
Drivers' Championship standings

	Pos.	Driver	Points
	1	(Brazil) Gabriel Bortoleto	58
3	2	(Switzerland) Grégoire Saucy	38
	3	(Sweden) Dino Beganovic	28
7	4	(Italy) Gabriele Minì	28
1	5	(Spain) Pepe Martí	25

Teams' Championship standings

	Pos.	Team	Points
	1	(Italy) Trident	100
	2	(Italy) Prema Racing	70
2	3	(United Kingdom) Hitech Pulse-Eight	54
1	4	(France) ART Grand Prix	45
1	5	(Spain) Campos Racing	29

- Note: Only the top five positions are included for both sets of standings.

== See also ==
- 2023 Australian Grand Prix
- 2023 Melbourne Formula 2 round

== Notes ==
Previous round: 2023 Sakhir Formula 3 round	FIA Formula 3 Championship; 2023 season	Next round: 2023 Monte Carlo Formula 3 round
Previous round: None	Melbourne Formula 3 round	Next round: 2024 Melbourne Formula 3 round
