= 2023 Budapest Formula 3 round =

Motor racing competition

(Hungary) 2023 Budapest Formula 3 round
Round details
- Round 7 of 9 in the 2023 FIA Formula 3 Championship.
- Layout of the Hungaroring
- Location: Hungaroring; Mogyoród, Hungary
- Course: Permanent racing circuit 4.381 km (2.722 mi)

Sprint Race
- Date: 22 July 2023
- Laps: 19
Podium
| First | (Italy) Gabriele Mini | Hitech Pulse-Eight |
| Second | (Brazil) Gabriel Bortoleto | Trident |
| Third | (Italy) Nikita Bedrin | Jenzer Motorsport |
Fastest lap
| Driver | (Brazil) Gabriel Bortoleto | Trident |
- Time: 1:36.474 (on lap 3)

Feature Race
- Date: 23 July 2023
- Laps: 19 (Note: Feature race has been shortened from 24 to 19 laps due to too high tyre wear.)
Pole position
| Driver | (United Kingdom) Zak O'Sullivan | Prema Racing |
| Time | 1:31.091 | |
Podium
| First | (United Kingdom) Zak O'Sullivan | Prema Racing |
| Second | (Sweden) Dino Beganovic | Prema Racing |
| Third | (Argentina) Franco Colapinto | MP Motorsport |
Fastest lap
| Driver | (United Kingdom) Zak O'Sullivan | Prema Racing |
- Time: 1:35.685 (on lap 3)

The 2023 Budapest Formula 3 round was a motor racing event held between 21 and 23 July at the Hungaroring, Mogyoród, Hungary. It was the seventh round of the 2023 FIA Formula 3 Championship, and was held in support of the 2023 Hungarian Grand Prix.

== Driver changes ==
Prior to the round at the Hungaroring, PHM Racing by Charouz announced that GB3 racer Woohyun Shin had taken over McKenzy Cresswell's seat for the rest of the season.

== Classification ==
=== Qualifying ===
| Pos. | No. | Driver | Team | Time/Gap | R1 | R2 |
|---|---|---|---|---|---|---|
| 1 | 3 | (United Kingdom) Zak O'Sullivan | Prema Racing | 1:31.091 | 12 | 1 |
| 2 | 2 | (Sweden) Dino Beganovic | Prema Racing | +0.403 | 11 | 2 |
| 3 | 4 | (Italy) Leonardo Fornaroli | Trident | +0.506 | 10 | 3 |
| 4 | 10 | (Argentina) Franco Colapinto | MP Motorsport | +0.535 | 9 | 4 |
| 5 | 6 | (Germany) Oliver Goethe | Trident | +0.615 | 7 | 5 |
| 6 | 1 | (Estonia) Paul Aron | Prema Racing | +0.653 | 6 | 6 |
| 7 | 9 | (Bulgaria) Nikola Tsolov | ART Grand Prix | +0.718 | 5 | 10^{2} |
| 8 | 12 | (United Kingdom) Jonny Edgar | MP Motorsport | +0.766 | 8^{1} | 7 |
| 9 | 5 | (Brazil) Gabriel Bortoleto | Trident | +0.785 | 4 | 8 |
| 10 | 24 | (Australia) Christian Mansell (Note: Mansell is an Australian driver who competed under a British licence in rounds 1–6 and an Australian licence in rounds 7–9.) | Campos Racing | +0.789 | 3 | 9 |
| 11 | 26 | (Italy) Nikita Bedrin (Note: Bedrin is a Russian driver competing under an Italian licence.) | Jenzer Motorsport | +1.030 | 2 | 11 |
| 12 | 15 | (Italy) Gabriele Minì | Hitech Pulse-Eight | +1.072 | 1 | 12 |
| 13 | 23 | (Spain) Pepe Martí | Campos Racing | +1.082 | 13 | 13 |
| 14 | 8 | (Switzerland) Grégoire Saucy | ART Grand Prix | +1.091 | 14 | 14 |
| 15 | 11 | (Spain) Mari Boya | MP Motorsport | +1.096 | 15 | 15 |
| 16 | 7 | (United States) Kaylen Frederick | ART Grand Prix | +1.177 | 16 | 16 |
| 17 | 27 | (United Kingdom) Taylor Barnard | Jenzer Motorsport | +1.224 | 17 | 17 |
| 18 | 16 | (United Kingdom) Luke Browning | Hitech Pulse-Eight | +1.234 | 18 | 18 |
| 19 | 17 | (Brazil) Caio Collet | Van Amersfoort Racing | +1.372 | 19 | 24^{3} |
| 20 | 18 | (Mexico) Rafael Villagómez | Van Amersfoort Racing | +1.633 | 20 | 25^{3} |
| 21 | 14 | (Colombia) Sebastián Montoya | Hitech Pulse-Eight | +1.687 | 21 | 19 |
| 22 | 25 | (Australia) Hugh Barter | Campos Racing | +1.814 | 22 | 20 |
| 23 | 22 | (Israel) Ido Cohen | Rodin Carlin | +2.077 | 23 | 21 |
| 24 | 19 | (Australia) Tommy Smith | Van Amersfoort Racing | +2.503 | 24 | 29^{3} |
| 25 | 21 | (United States) Max Esterson | Rodin Carlin | +2.806 | 25 | 22 |
| 26 | 28 | (Mexico) Alex García | Jenzer Motorsport | +3.324 | 26 | 23 |
| 27 | 31 | (South Korea) Woohyun Shin | PHM Racing by Charouz | +3.432 | 27 | 26 |
| 28 | 29 | (Germany) Sophia Flörsch | PHM Racing by Charouz | +3.675 | 28 | 27 |
| 29 | 30 | (Brazil) Roberto Faria | PHM Racing by Charouz | +3.876 | 29 | 28 |
107% time: 1:37.467 (+6.376)
| — | 20 | (United Kingdom) Oliver Gray | Rodin Carlin | +36.884 | 30 | 30 |

Notes:

- ^1 - Jonny Edgar received a 5-second penalty for causing a collision with Caio Collet at Silverstone, which carried over and got converted into a 3-place grid penalty for the sprint race here.
- ^2 - Nikola Tsolov received a 3-place grid penalty for the feature race for causing a collision with Pepe Martí in the sprint race.
- ^3 - Caio Collet, Rafael Villagómez and Tommy Smith received a 5-place grid penalty for the feature race for Van Amersfoort Racing not bringing their tyres to Parc Ferme after sprint race.

=== Sprint race ===
| Pos. | No. | Driver | Team | Laps | Time/Gap | Grid | Pts. |
|---|---|---|---|---|---|---|---|
| 1 | 15 | (Italy) Gabriele Minì | Hitech Pulse-Eight | 19 | 33:38.243 | 1 | 10 |
| 2 | 5 | (Brazil) Gabriel Bortoleto | Trident | 19 | +4.292 | 4 | 9 (1) |
| 3 | 26 | (Italy) Nikita Bedrin | Jenzer Motorsport | 19 | +4.961 | 2 | 8 |
| 4 | 1 | (Estonia) Paul Aron | Prema Racing | 19 | +5.105 | 6 | 7 |
| 5 | 6 | (Germany) Oliver Goethe | Trident | 19 | +8.239 | 7 | 6 |
| 6 | 24 | (Australia) Christian Mansell | Campos Racing | 19 | +8.862 | 3 | 5 |
| 7 | 10 | (Argentina) Franco Colapinto | MP Motorsport | 19 | +9.942 | 9 | 4 |
| 8 | 12 | (United Kingdom) Jonny Edgar | MP Motorsport | 19 | +10.194 | 8 | 3 |
| 9 | 8 | (Switzerland) Grégoire Saucy | ART Grand Prix | 19 | +10.367 | 14 | 2 |
| 10 | 2 | (Sweden) Dino Beganovic | Prema Racing | 19 | +11.087 | 11 | 1 |
| 11 | 27 | (United Kingdom) Taylor Barnard | Jenzer Motorsport | 19 | +13.579 | 17 | |
| 12 | 7 | (United States) Kaylen Frederick | ART Grand Prix | 19 | +13.838 | 16 | |
| 13 | 4 | (Italy) Leonardo Fornaroli | Trident | 19 | +16.142 | 10 | |
| 14 | 20 | (United Kingdom) Oliver Gray | Rodin Carlin | 19 | +16.844 | 30 | |
| 15 | 29 | (Germany) Sophia Flörsch | PHM Racing by Charouz | 19 | +17.021 | 28 | |
| 16 | 16 | (United Kingdom) Luke Browning | Hitech Pulse-Eight | 19 | +17.051^{1} | 18 | |
| 17 | 18 | (Mexico) Rafael Villagómez | Van Amersfoort Racing | 19 | +17.626 | 20 | |
| 18 | 21 | (United States) Max Esterson | Rodin Carlin | 19 | +18.008 | 25 | |
| 19 | 30 | (Brazil) Roberto Faria | PHM Racing by Charouz | 19 | +18.525 | 29 | |
| 20 | 23 | (Spain) Pepe Martí | Campos Racing | 19 | +18.891 | 13 | |
| 21 | 3 | (United Kingdom) Zak O'Sullivan | Prema Racing | 19 | +21.936 | 12 | |
| 22 | 11 | (Spain) Mari Boya | MP Motorsport | 19 | +22.832 | 15 | |
| 23 | 17 | (Brazil) Caio Collet | Van Amersfoort Racing | 19 | +23.997^{2} | 19 | |
| 24 | 19 | (Australia) Tommy Smith | Van Amersfoort Racing | 19 | +49.820 | 24 | |
| 25 | 25 | (Australia) Hugh Barter | Campos Racing | 19 | +1:00.361^{3} | 22 | |
| 26 | 31 | (South Korea) Woohyun Shin | PHM Racing by Charouz | 18 | +1 lap^{4} | 27 | |
| 27 | 28 | (Mexico) Alex García | Jenzer Motorsport | 18 | +1 lap | 26 | |
| DNF | 9 | (Bulgaria) Nikola Tsolov | ART Grand Prix | 16 | Collision | 5 | |
| DNF | 14 | (Colombia) Sebastián Montoya | Hitech Pulse-Eight | 10 | Retired | 21 | |
| DNF | 22 | (Israel) Ido Cohen | Rodin Carlin | 1 | Collision | 23 | |
Fastest lap set by (Brazil) Gabriel Bortoleto: 1:36.474 (lap 3)

Notes:

- ^1 - Luke Browning received a 5-second time penalty for overtaking Oliver Gray off track.
- ^2 - Caio Collet received a 10-second time penalty for causing a collision with Ido Cohen.
- ^3 - Hugh Barter received a 10-second time penalty for causing a collision with Roberto Faria.
- ^4 - Woohyun Shin received a 5-second time penalty for track limits violations.

=== Feature race ===
| Pos. | No. | Driver | Team | Laps | Time/Gap | Grid | Pts. |
|---|---|---|---|---|---|---|---|
| 1 | 3 | (United Kingdom) Zak O'Sullivan | Prema Racing | 19 | 31:27.598 | 1 | 25 (3) |
| 2 | 2 | (Sweden) Dino Beganovic | Prema Racing | 19 | +2.320 | 2 | 18 |
| 3 | 10 | (Argentina) Franco Colapinto | MP Motorsport | 19 | +6.471 | 4 | 15 |
| 4 | 6 | (Germany) Oliver Goethe | Trident | 19 | +13.276 | 5 | 12 |
| 5 | 1 | (Estonia) Paul Aron | Prema Racing | 19 | +19.068 | 6 | 10 |
| 6 | 23 | (Spain) Pepe Martí | Campos Racing | 19 | +20.272 | 13 | 8 |
| 7 | 5 | (Brazil) Gabriel Bortoleto | Trident | 19 | +27.734 | 8 | 6 |
| 8 | 12 | (United Kingdom) Jonny Edgar | MP Motorsport | 19 | +27.844 | 7 | 4 |
| 9 | 4 | (Italy) Leonardo Fornaroli | Trident | 19 | +29.855 | 3 | 2 |
| 10 | 11 | (Spain) Mari Boya | MP Motorsport | 19 | +30.585 | 15 | 1 |
| 11 | 24 | (Australia) Christian Mansell | Campos Racing | 19 | +35.615 | 9 | |
| 12 | 16 | (United Kingdom) Luke Browning | Hitech Pulse-Eight | 19 | +36.764 | 18 | |
| 13 | 25 | (Australia) Hugh Barter | Campos Racing | 19 | +36.948 | 20 | |
| 14 | 27 | (United Kingdom) Taylor Barnard | Jenzer Motorsport | 19 | +37.161 | 17 | |
| 15 | 8 | (Switzerland) Grégoire Saucy | ART Grand Prix | 19 | +37.681 | 14 | |
| 16 | 15 | (Italy) Gabriele Minì | Hitech Pulse-Eight | 19 | +37.987 | 12 | |
| 17 | 18 | (Mexico) Rafael Villagómez | Van Amersfoort Racing | 19 | +49.097 | 25 | |
| 18 | 29 | (Germany) Sophia Flörsch | PHM Racing by Charouz | 19 | +54.344 | 27 | |
| 19 | 17 | (Brazil) Caio Collet | Van Amersfoort Racing | 19 | +55.451 | 24 | |
| 20 | 30 | (Brazil) Roberto Faria | PHM Racing by Charouz | 19 | +57.491 | 28 | |
| 21 | 21 | (United States) Max Esterson | Rodin Carlin | 19 | +58.661^{1} | 22 | |
| 22 | 22 | (Israel) Ido Cohen | Rodin Carlin | 19 | +1:04.788 | 21 | |
| 23 | 26 | (Italy) Nikita Bedrin | Jenzer Motorsport | 19 | +1.05.415 | 11 | |
| 24 | 14 | (Colombia) Sebastián Montoya | Hitech Pulse-Eight | 19 | +1:09.357 | 19 | |
| 25 | 9 | (Bulgaria) Nikola Tsolov | ART Grand Prix | 19 | +1:10.950^{2} | 10 | |
| 26 | 28 | (Mexico) Alex García | Jenzer Motorsport | 19 | +1:12.726 | 23 | |
| 27 | 20 | (United Kingdom) Oliver Gray | Rodin Carlin | 19 | +1:14.245 | 30 | |
| 28 | 31 | (South Korea) Woohyun Shin | PHM Racing by Charouz | 19 | +1:19.452^{3} | 26 | |
| 29 | 19 | (Australia) Tommy Smith | Van Amersfoort Racing | 19 | +1:24.896 | 29 | |
| DNF | 7 | (United States) Kaylen Frederick | ART Grand Prix | 9 | Suspension failure | 16 | |
Fastest lap set by (United Kingdom) Zak O'Sullivan: 1:35.686 (lap 3)

Notes:

- ^1 - Max Esterson received a 5-second time penalty for forcing Sebastián Montoya off track.
- ^2 - Nikola Tsolov received a 10-second time penalty for causing a collision with Taylor Barnard.
- ^3 - Woohyun Shin received a 5-second time penalty for track limits violations.

== Standings after the event ==
Drivers' Championship standings

| | Pos. | Driver | Points |
|---|---|---|---|
| | 1 | (Brazil) Gabriel Bortoleto | 144 |
| 5 | 2 | (United Kingdom) Zak O'Sullivan | 101 |
| 1 | 3 | (Spain) Pepe Martí | 100 |
| | 4 | (Estonia) Paul Aron | 94 |
| | 5 | (Sweden) Dino Beganovic | 94 |

Teams' Championship standings

| | Pos. | Team | Points |
|---|---|---|---|
| 1 | 1 | (Italy) Prema Racing | 289 |
| 1 | 2 | (Italy) Trident | 274 |
| | 3 | (United Kingdom) Hitech Pulse-Eight | 154 |
| | 4 | (Spain) Campos Racing | 143 |
| | 5 | (Netherlands) MP Motorsport | 129 |

- Note: Only the top five positions are included for both sets of standings.

== See also ==
- 2023 Hungarian Grand Prix
- 2023 Budapest Formula 2 round

== Notes ==
| Previous round: 2023 Silverstone Formula 3 round | FIA Formula 3 Championship; 2023 season | Next round: 2023 Spa-Francorchamps Formula 3 round |
| Previous round: 2022 Budapest Formula 3 round | Budapest Formula 3 round | Next round: 2024 Budapest Formula 3 round |
