= 2023 Monza Formula 3 round =

Motor racing event

(Italy) 2023 Monza Formula 3 round
Round details
- Round 9 of 9 in the 2023 FIA Formula 3 Championship.
- Location: Monza Circuit; Monza, Italy
- Course: Permanent racing facility 5.793 km (3.599 mi)

Sprint Race
- Date: 2 September 2023
- Laps: 18
Podium
First	(Argentina) Franco Colapinto	MP Motorsport
Second	(Brazil) Gabriel Bortoleto	Trident
Third	(Spain) Mari Boya	MP Motorsport
Fastest lap
Driver	(Germany) Oliver Goethe	Trident
- Time: 1:39.743 (on lap 8)

Feature Race
- Date: 3 September 2023
- Laps: 21
Pole position
Driver	(Germany) Oliver Goethe	Trident
Time	1:38.909	
Podium
First	(United Kingdom) Jonny Edgar	MP Motorsport
Second	(United Kingdom) Zak O'Sullivan	Prema Racing
Third	(United Kingdom) Taylor Barnard	Jenzer Motorsport
Fastest lap
Driver	(Brazil) Gabriel Bortoleto	Trident
- Time: 1:40.042 (on 11)

The 2023 Monza Formula 3 round was a motor racing event held between 1 and 3 September at the Monza Circuit. It was the final race of the 2023 FIA Formula 3 Championship and was held in support of the 2023 Italian Grand Prix.

Heading into the final round with a 38-point-margin over his nearest rivals Paul Aron and Pepe Martí, Gabriel Bortoleto was crowned the 2023 Drivers' Champion after qualifying on Friday as Aron and Martí both failed to score pole position in order two secure two vital points for their respective championship hopes. Bortoleto became the next series' champion as a rookie since Oscar Piastri in 2020.

== Classification ==
After Paul Aron and Pepe Martí failed to secure the feature race pole position and the two points that came with it Gabriel Bortoleto became the 2023 FIA formula 3 champion becoming the 5th FIA Formula 3 champion, the first Brazilian driver and first driver for Trident to win the FIA Formula 3 Championship.

=== Qualifying ===
Pos.	No.	Driver	Team	Time/Gap	Grid SR	Grid FR
1	6	(Germany) Oliver Goethe	Trident	1:38.909	22^{1}	1
2	17	(Brazil) Caio Collet	Van Amersfoort Racing	+0.092	11	2
3	1	(Estonia) Paul Aron	Prema Racing	+0.134	10	3
4	12	(United Kingdom) Jonny Edgar	MP Motorsport	+0.228	9	4
5	5	(Brazil) Gabriel Bortoleto	Trident	+0.352	8	5
6	3	(United Kingdom) Zak O'Sullivan	Prema Racing	+0.410	7	6
7	4	(Italy) Leonardo Fornaroli	Trident	+0.431	6	7
8	27	(United Kingdom) Taylor Barnard	Jenzer Motorsport	+0.664	5	8
9	9	(Bulgaria) Nikola Tsolov	ART Grand Prix	+0.671	4	9
10	8	(Switzerland) Grégoire Saucy	ART Grand Prix	+0.692	3	10
11	11	(Spain) Mari Boya	MP Motorsport	+0.875	2	11
12	10	(Argentina) Franco Colapinto	MP Motorsport	+0.970	1	12
13	23	(Spain) Pepe Martí	Campos Racing	+1.205	12	13
14	24	(Australia) Christian Mansell (Note: Mansell is an Australian driver who competed under a British licence in rounds 1–6 and an Australian licence in rounds 7–9.)	Campos Racing	+1.267	13	14
15	19	(Australia) Tommy Smith	Van Amersfoort Racing	+1.294	14	15
16	7	(United States) Kaylen Frederick	ART Grand Prix	+1.302	15	16
17	18	(Mexico) Rafael Villagómez	Van Amersfoort Racing	+1.731	16	17
18	29	(Germany) Sophia Flörsch	PHM Racing by Charouz	+2.286	17	18
19	31	(South Korea) Woohyun Shin	PHM Racing by Charouz	+2.330	18	22^{4}
20	25	(Switzerland) Joshua Dufek	Campos Racing	+2.510	19	19
21	28	(Mexico) Alex García	Jenzer Motorsport	+2.513	20	20
22	30	(Brazil) Roberto Faria	PHM Racing by Charouz	+3.602	21	21
107% time: 1:45.832 (+6.923)
—	2	(Sweden) Dino Beganovic	Prema Racing	No time set	23	23
—	26	(Italy) Nikita Bedrin (Note: Bedrin is a Russian driver competing under an Italian licence.)	Jenzer Motorsport	No time set	24	24
—	20	(United Kingdom) Oliver Gray	Rodin Carlin	No time set	25^{2}	25
DSQ	15	(Italy) Gabriele Minì	Hitech Pulse Eight	Disqualified^{3}	26	26
DSQ	16	(United Kingdom) Luke Browning	Hitech Pulse Eight	Disqualified^{3}	27	27
DSQ	14	(Colombia) Sebastián Montoya	Hitech Pulse Eight	Disqualified^{3}	28	28
DSQ	22	(Israel) Ido Cohen	Rodin Carlin	Disqualified^{3}	29	29
DSQ	21	(Italy) Francesco Simonazzi	Rodin Carlin	Disqualified^{3}	30	30

Notes

- ^1 – Oliver Goethe received a 10-place grid penalty due to Trident team personnel remaining on the grid after the 15-second signal in the Spa-Francorchamps feature race.
- ^2 - Oliver Gray was handed a 8-place grid penalty for the sprint race for causing a collision with Hugh Barter in the Spa-Francorchamps feature race and for causing a collision with Ido Cohen in the qualifying.
- ^3 - Gabriele Minì, Luke Browning, Sebastián Montoya, Ido Cohen, and Francesco Simonazzi were all disqualified from qualifying after it was found that their tyres were changed under parc fermé regulations, breaching Article 2.5.5 of the FIA International Sporting Code.
- ^4 - Woohyun Shin received a 5-place grid penalty for the feature race for speeding in the pit lane in the sprint race.

=== Sprint race ===
Pos.	No.	Driver	Team	Laps	Time/Gap	Grid	Pts.
1	10	(Argentina) Franco Colapinto	MP Motorsport	18	34:06.988	1	10
2	5	(Brazil) Gabriel Bortoleto	Trident	18	+1.325	8	9
3	11	(Spain) Mari Boya	MP Motorsport	18	+2.118	2	8
4	27	(United Kingdom) Taylor Barnard	Jenzer Motorsport	18	+2.322	5	7
5	6	(Germany) Oliver Goethe	Trident	18	+8.012	22	6 (1)
6	15	(Italy) Gabriele Minì	Hitech Pulse-Eight	18	+9.885	26	5
7	24	(Australia) Christian Mansell	Campos Racing	18	+11.086	13	4
8	4	(Italy) Leonardo Fornaroli	Trident	18	+11.197^{1}	6	3
9	9	(Bulgaria) Nikola Tsolov	ART Grand Prix	18	+11.467	4	2
10	18	(Mexico) Rafael Villagómez	Van Amersfoort Racing	18	+12.133	16	1
11	3	(United Kingdom) Zak O'Sullivan	Prema Racing	18	+12.461^{2}	7	
12	14	(Colombia) Sebastián Montoya	Hitech Pulse-Eight	18	+12.766	28	
13	2	(Sweden) Dino Beganovic	Prema Racing	18	+16.276	23	
14	25	(Switzerland) Joshua Dufek	Campos Racing	18	+16.532	19	
15	26	(Italy) Nikita Bedrin	Jenzer Motorsport	18	+20.035	24	
16	29	(Germany) Sophia Flörsch	PHM Racing by Charouz	18	+20.338	17	
17	28	(Mexico) Alex García	Jenzer Motorsport	18	+21.291	20	
18	21	(Italy) Francesco Simonazzi	Rodin Carlin	18	+21.784	30	
19	17	(Brazil) Caio Collet	Van Amersfoort Racing	18	+23.684^{3}	11	
20	7	(United States) Kaylen Frederick	ART Grand Prix	18	+30.923^{4}	15	
21	22	(Israel) Ido Cohen	Rodin Carlin	18	+33.316	29	
22	8	(Switzerland) Grégoire Saucy	ART Grand Prix	18	+1:36.911	3	
NC	30	(Brazil) Roberto Faria	PHM Racing by Charouz	15	Not classified	21	
DNF	20	(United Kingdom) Oliver Gray	Rodin Carlin	11	Collision	25	
DNF	19	(Australia) Tommy Smith	Van Amersfoort Racing	10	Collision	14	
DNF	31	(South Korea) Woohyun Shin	PHM Racing by Charouz	2	Collision	18	
DNF	1	(Estonia) Paul Aron	Prema Racing	0	Collision	10	
DNF	23	(Spain) Pepe Martí	Campos Racing	0	Collision	12	
DNF	12	(United Kingdom) Jonny Edgar	MP Motorsport	0	Collision	9	
DSQ	16	(United Kingdom) Luke Browning	Hitech Pulse-Eight	18	Disqualified	27	
Fastest lap set by (Germany) Oliver Goethe: 1:39.743 (lap 8)

Notes:

- ^1 - Leonardo Fornaroli received a 5-secomd time penalty for track limits violations.
- ^2 - Zak O'Sullivan received a 10-second time penalty for causimg a collision with Grégoire Saucy.
- ^3 - Caio Collet received a 10-second time penalty for causing a collision with Paul Aron.
- ^4 - Kaylen Frederick received a 10-second time penalty for causing a collision with Tommy Smith.

=== Feature race ===
Pos.	No.	Driver	Team	Laps	Time/Gap	Grid	Pts.
1	12	(United Kingdom) Jonny Edgar	MP Motorsport	21	47:05.178	4	25
2	3	(United Kingdom) Zak O'Sullivan	Prema Racing	21	+0.287	6	18
3	27	(United Kingdom) Taylor Barnard	Jenzer Motorsport	21	+0.825	8	15
4	17	(Brazil) Caio Collet	Van Amersfoort Racing	21	+1.047	2	12
5	5	(Brazil) Gabriel Bortoleto	Trident	21	+1.515	5	10 (1)
6	11	(Spain) Mari Boya	MP Motorsport	21	+1.945	11	8
7	1	(Estonia) Paul Aron	Prema Racing	21	+2.136	3	6
8	24	(Australia) Christian Mansell	Campos Racing	21	+2.911	14	4
9	2	(Sweden) Dino Beganovic	Prema Racing	21	+3.383	23	2
10	18	(Mexico) Rafael Villagómez	Van Amersfoort Racing	21	+3.692	17	1
11	21	(Italy) Francesco Simonazzi	Rodin Carlin	21	+6.735	30	
12	9	(Bulgaria) Nikola Tsolov	ART Grand Prix	21	+6.936	9	
13	29	(Germany) Sophia Flörsch	PHM Racing by Charouz	21	+7.616	18	
14	25	(Switzerland) Joshua Dufek	Campos Racing	21	+7.655	19	
15	4	(Italy) Leonardo Fornaroli	Trident	21	+8.198^{1}	7	
16	20	(United Kingdom) Oliver Gray	Rodin Carlin	21	+8.405	25	
17	31	(South Korea) Woohyun Shin	PHM Racing by Charouz	21	+11.107^{2}	22	
18	16	(United Kingdom) Luke Browning	Hitech Pulse-Eight	21	+11.276^{3}	27	
19	15	(Italy) Gabriele Minì	Hitech Pulse-Eight	21	+21.142^{4}	26	
20	19	(Australia) Tommy Smith	Van Amersfoort Racing	21	+53.990	15	
21	28	(Mexico) Alex García	Jenzer Motorsport	20	+1 lap	20	
22	30	(Brazil) Roberto Faria	PHM Racing by Charouz	18	Collision	21	
DNF	26	(Italy) Nikita Bedrin	Jenzer Motorsport	16	Collision	24	
DNF	23	(Spain) Pepe Martí	Campos Racing	15	Collision	13	
DNF	22	(Israel) Ido Cohen	Rodin Carlin	15	Crash	29	
DNF	14	(Colombia) Sebastián Montoya	Hitech Pulse-Eight	12	Collision	28	
DNF	7	(United States) Kaylen Frederick	ART Grand Prix	12	Collision	PL	
DNF	8	(Switzerland) Grégoire Saucy	ART Grand Prix	5	Collision	10	
DNF	10	(Argentina) Franco Colapinto	MP Motorsport	0	Collision	12	
DNS	6	(Germany) Oliver Goethe	Trident	0	Engine	1	
Fastest lap set by (Brazil) Gabriel Bortoleto: 1:40.042 (lap 11)

Notes:

- ^1 - Leonardo Fornaroli received a 5-secomd time penalty for forcing Paul Aron off track.
- ^2 - Woohyun Shin received a 5-second time penalty for overtaking Francesco Simonazzi off track.
- ^3 - Luke Browning received a 5-second time penalty for speeding under safety car conditions.
- ^4 - Gabriele Minì received a 5-second time penalty for overtaking Oliver Gray off track and a 10-second time penalty for causing a collision with Sebastián Montoya.
- Oilver Goethe Did Not Start Due To Suffering a Engine Problem His Grid Slot was Vacant

== Standings after the event ==
Drivers' Championship standings

	Pos.	Driver	Points
	1	(Brazil) **Gabriel Bortoleto**	164
2	2	(United Kingdom) Zak O'Sullivan	119
1	3	(Estonia) Paul Aron	112
1	4	(Argentina) Franco Colapinto	110
2	5	(Spain) Pepe Martí	105

Teams' Championship standings

	Pos.	Team	Points
	1	(Italy) **Prema Racing**	327
	2	(Italy) Trident	306
2	3	(Netherlands) MP Motorsport	194
1	4	(Spain) Campos Racing	179
1	5	(United Kingdom) Hitech Pulse-Eight	170

- Note: Only the top five positions are included for both sets of standings
- Note: Bold text indicates both the Drivers' and Teams' Champion respectively.

== See also ==
- 2023 Italian Grand Prix
- 2023 Monza Formula 2 round

== Notes ==
Previous round: 2023 Spa-Francorchamps Formula 3 round	FIA Formula 3 Championship; 2023 season	Next round: 2024 Sakhir Formula 3 round
Previous round: 2022 Monza Formula 3 round	Monza Formula 3 round	Next round: 2024 Monza Formula 3 round
