= Hugh Barter =

Australian-Japanese racing driver (born 2005)

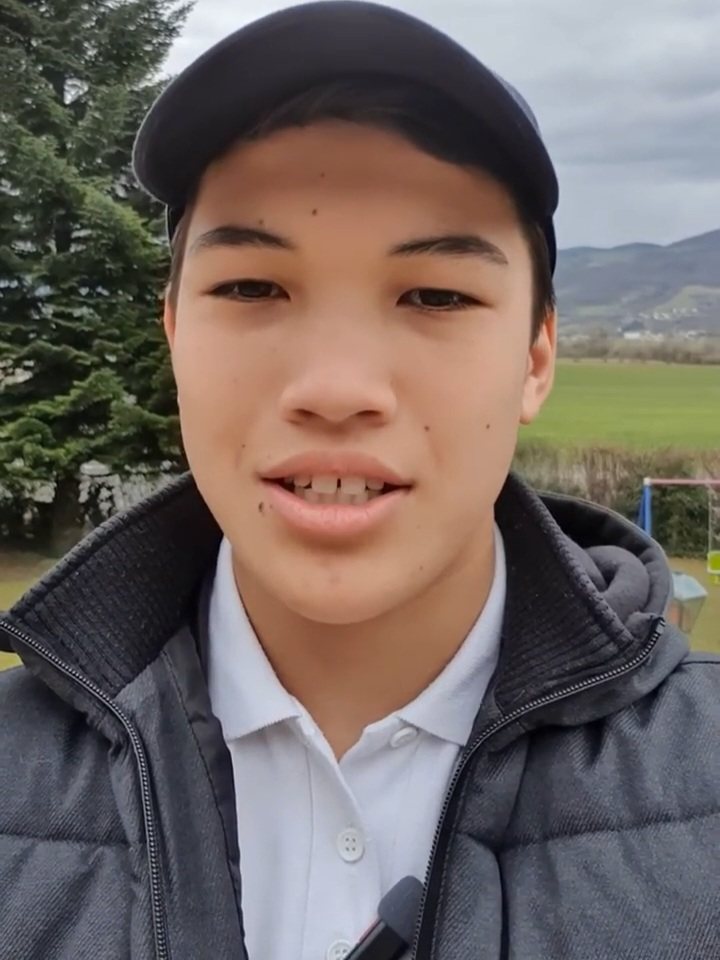
- Barter in 2021
- Nationality: (Australia) Australian (Japan) Japanese via dual nationality
- Born: 15 September 2005 (age 21) Nagoya, Aichi, Japan

FIA Formula 3 Championship career
- Debut season: 2023
- Former teams: Campos Racing
- Starts: 16 (16 entries)
- Wins: 0
- Podiums: 0
- Poles: 0
- Fastest laps: 0
- Best finish: 19th in 2023

Previous series
- 2022 2021–22: Spanish F4 Championship; French F4 Championship

Hugh Barter (飛雲・バーター, Hyū Bātā; born 15 September 2005) is an Australian-Japanese racing driver who serves as a test and simulator driver for Lola Yamaha ABT Formula E Team. He last raced in the 2025 Ultimate Cup Series for Winfield Racing. Barter competed in both the Spanish F4 and French F4 Championship, finishing runner-up in French F4 in 2021 and 2022 respectively as well as in the 2022 F4 Spanish Championship. In 2024, he took part in the Indian Racing League and the F4 Indian Championship.

== Career ==
=== Karting ===
After starting to race in karts at the age of six, Barter progressed into national competitions, where he came second in the Australian Kart Championship in 2019 and won the opening round of the 2020 season, prior to the season being abandoned due to the COVID-19 pandemic. He also competed in the Rotax Max Challenge Grand Finals on two occasions, where he achieved eighth and ninth places in 2016 and 2019 respectively.

=== Lower formulae ===
==== 2021 ====
Barter began racing in cars in 2021, having signed up for the French F4 Championship. The first round at Nogaro brought immediate success, as the Australian took victory on Sunday, whilst the following event at Magny-Cours heralded a triple of podiums, bringing Barter into the championship fight. However, the middle part of the season would not yield the strongest results, with just two podiums coming his way in the space of four rounds, which meant that Barter had lost a lot of ground to fellow contenders Esteban Masson and Macéo Capietto going into the season finale. There, Barter showed some more good form, scoring a pair of podiums in the main races, and after a disqualification for Capietto, Barter inherited the win of the final race, which put him second in the standings.

==== 2022 ====
For the 2022 season, Barter opted to remain in Formula 4, citing his lack of pole positions and their importance in higher-level championships, such as Formula Regional, as a main reason for him to stay in the category. The Australian remained in French F4, whilst also competing for Campos Racing in the F4 Spanish Championship. In the latter, Barter started his campaign out strongly, being victorious in the season opener at Portimão. After this however, teammate Nikola Tsolov would become the dominant force within the championship, leading Barter to only take one podium from the subsequent two rounds. He would experience a more successful weekend at Spa-Francorchamps, finishing second in all three races to Tsolov, cementing himself in second place overall. At the next round in Aragón, Barter would add to his tally with two victories, as well as a third place in Race 2, before taking a hattrick of wins at Navarra, where he also took a pair of pole positions. By this stage, Tsolov had been crowned as the champion, with Barter ending his season by scoring two further podiums at Barcelona, securing himself the runner-up spot.

In the latter championship, Barter proved his experience within the category by taking pole position for and winning the main races in Nogaro, before following that up with a win at the tricky Pau Circuit, taking the overall lead which he extended with another podium in Race 3 on the same weekend. Throughout the next four events, Barter would win seven races and take two more podiums in a dominant display at Lédenon, but he would be hindered from taking any points from the weekends at Spa and Valencia, as he had competed at those tracks during his Spanish F4 campaign, which meant that Barter went into the season finale with a 32-point deficit to Alessandro Giusti. An early retirement in Race 1 meant an end for Barter's title ambitions, as, despite taking another podium on Sunday, he finished second in the championship.

=== FIA Formula 3 Championship ===
In late September 2022, Barter partook in the FIA Formula 3 post-season test with Campos Racing during the second and third days. In January 2023, Campos announced that Barter had signed with the team for the full 2023 season. Barter had a difficult season, having to wait until the fifth round at the Red Bull Ring to score points, placing eighth in the feature race. He finished sixth in the Silverstone sprint race after a right gamble, and again finished sixth in the Spa sprint race having started on reverse pole. Shortly before the Monza finale, it was announced that Barter would be unable to complete the season due to unspecified issues, and was replaced by FRECA racer Joshua Dufek. He placed 19th overall, with 14 points.

=== Formula E ===
In April 2023, Barter participated in the Formula E Berlin rookie test with Maserati MSG Racing. Two years later in July 2025, Barter returned to the Berlin rookie test, driving for Lola Yamaha ABT. He made another appearance with the team the next year during the 2026 Miami ePrix, whilst also being announced as their test and simulator driver. He will make a further appearance with the team during the rookie test at the Madrid ePrix.

=== E-Sports ===
Barter races for Drago Racing Esports Team in iRacing.

== Personal life ==
Barter was born in Nagoya to a Japanese mother and Australian father and grew up in Melbourne.

== Karting record ==
=== Karting career summary ===
Season	Series	Team	Position
2016	Australian Kart Championship — Cadet 12		10th
2016	Rotax Max Challenge Grand Finals — Mini MAX	International Karting Distribution	8th
2018	Australian Kart Championship — KA4 Junior		3rd
2019	Australian Kart Championship — KA4		2nd
2019	Rotax Pro Tour Championship — J-Max		3rd
2019	Victoria Kart Championship — KA4		1st
2019	Victoria Kart Championship — KA3		2nd
2019	Rotax Max Challenge Grand Finals — Rotax Junior		9th
2020	Australian Kart Championship — KA2		NC‡

^{‡} The championship was cancelled after two rounds due to the COVID-19 pandemic.

== Racing record ==
=== Racing career summary ===
Season	Series	Team	Races	Wins	Poles	F/Laps	Podiums	Points	Position
2021	French F4 Championship	FFSA Academy	20	2	0	3	8	213	**2nd**
2022	French F4 Championship	FFSA Academy	21	10	7	12	14	241	**2nd**
2022	F4 Spanish Championship	Campos Racing	21	6	4	4	13	287	**2nd**
2023	FIA Formula 3 Championship	Campos Racing	16	0	0	1	0	14	19th
2024	F4 Indian Championship	Godspeed Kochi	5	3	3	5	3	95	5th
2025	Ultimate Cup European Series - Hoosier Formula Cup	Winfield Racing	12	9	6	6	11	296	4th
2025–26	Formula E	Lola Yamaha ABT Formula E Team	Test and Simulator driver						

^{*} Season still in progress.

=== Complete French F4 Championship results ===
(key) (Races in bold indicate pole position) (Races in italics indicate fastest lap)

Year	1	2	3	4	5	6	7	8	9	10	11	12	13	14	15	16	17	18	19	20	21	Pos	Points
2021	NOG; 1; 4	NOG; 2; 7	NOG; 3; 1	MAG1; 1; 2	MAG1; 2; 3	MAG1; 3; 2	HUN; 1; 8	HUN; 2; 7	HUN; 3; 7	LÉD; 1; 4	LÉD; 2; 4	LÉD; 3; 3	MNZ; 1 Ret	MNZ; 2; 6	MNZ; 3 C	LEC; 1; 4	LEC; 2; 6	LEC; 3; 3	MAG2; 1; 2	MAG2; 2; 5	MAG2; 3; 1	2nd	213
2022	**NOG**; **1**; 1	NOG; 2; 7	**NOG**; **3**; 1	PAU; 1; 1	PAU; 2; 5	**PAU**; **3**; 2	**MAG**; **1**; 1	MAG; 2; 20	**MAG**; **3**; 1	**SPA**; **1**; 1	SPA; 2; 6	**SPA**; **3**; 1	LÉD; 1; 1	LÉD; 2; 2	LÉD; 3; 2	CRT; 1; 1	CRT; 2; 4	CRT; 3; 1	LEC; 1 Ret	LEC; 2; 4	LEC; 3; 3	2nd	241

=== Complete F4 Spanish Championship results ===
(key) (Races in bold indicate pole position) (Races in italics indicate fastest lap)

Year	Team	1	2	3	4	5	6	7	8	9	10	11	12	13	14	15	16	17	18	19	20	21	Pos	Points
2022	Campos Racing	ALG; 1; 1	ALG; 2; 4	ALG; 3; 4	JER; 1; 10	JER; 2; 6	JER; 3; 3	CRT; 1; 18	CRT; 2; 7	**CRT**; **3**; 13	SPA; 1; 2	SPA; 2; 2	SPA; 3; 2	ARA; 1; 1	ARA; 2; 3	**ARA**; **3**; 1	**NAV**; **1**; 1	**NAV**; **2**; 1	NAV; 3; 1	CAT; 1; 5	CAT; 2; 2	CAT; 3; 3	2nd	287

=== Complete FIA Formula 3 Championship results ===
(key) (Races in bold indicate pole position) (Races in italics indicate points for the fastest lap of top ten finishers)

Year	Entrant	1	2	3	4	5	6	7	8	9	10	11	12	13	14	15	16	17	18	DC	Points
2023	Campos Racing	BHR; SPR; 11	BHR; FEA; 26	MEL; SPR; 19	MEL; FEA; 15	MON; SPR; 25	MON; FEA; 26	CAT; SPR; 19	CAT; FEA; 13	RBR; SPR; 22	RBR; FEA; 8	SIL; SPR; 6	SIL; FEA; 13	HUN; SPR; 25	HUN; FEA; 13	SPA; SPR; 6	SPA; FEA; 22	MNZ; SPR	MNZ; FEA	19th	14

=== Complete F4 Indian Championship results ===
(key) (Races in bold indicate pole position) (Races in italics indicate fastest lap)

Year	Entrant	1	2	3	4	5	6	7	8	9	10	11	12	13	14	15	Pos	Points
2024	Godspeed Kochi	**MAD1**; **1** Ret	MAD1; 2; 1	**MAD1**; **3**; 1	**CHE**; **1**; 1	CHE; 2; 5	MAD2; 1	MAD2; 2	MAD2; 3	MAD2; 4	KAR1; 1	KAR1; 2	KAR1; 3	KAR2; 1	KAR2; 2	KAR2; 3	5th	95
