= 2022 F4 Spanish Championship =

7th season of the Spanish F4 Championship

The 2022 F4 Spanish Championship was the seventh season of the Spanish F4 Championship. It was a multi-event motor racing championship for open wheel, formula racing cars regulated according to FIA Formula 4 regulations, based in Spain. It was the first season to use the Tatuus F4-T421 car. It was also the first full season in which the series is partnered with the Richard Mille Young Talent Academy. The Championship was won by Bulgarian driver Nikola Tsolov with a round to spare, at Navarra.

== Entry list ==
Campos Racing and MP Motorsport split their teams in order to follow the four-car limit per entrant.

Team	No.	Driver	Class	Rounds
(Spain) Drivex School	1	(Spain) Maksim Arkhangelskiy (Note: Arkhangelskiy, Ryabov and Pingasov are Russian, but they competed under a Spanish licence as Russian national emblems were banned by the FIA following the Russian invasion of Ukraine. Smal and Blokhina, also Russians, competed under a Kyrgyz and an Italian licence respectively for the same reason. Mavlyutov, a Turkish-Russian, competed under a British licence.)		All
(Spain) Drivex School	11	(Spain) Bruno del Pino	R	All
(Spain) Drivex School	13	(Spain) Daniel Nogales	R	5–7
(Spain) Drivex School	20	(Italy) Victoria Blokhina	F G	7
(Spain) Drivex School	30	(France) Gaël Julien		All
(Spain) Drivex School	71	(Australia) Noah Lisle	R	1
(Spain) Fórmula de Campeones	2	(Spain) Max Mayer	R	All
(Spain) Fórmula de Campeones	8	(Spain) Álvaro García	R	All
(Spain) Fórmula de Campeones	17	(Brazil) Aurelia Nobels	R F	4
(Spain) Fórmula de Campeones	18	(Mexico) Jorge Campos		1
(Spain) Fórmula de Campeones	95	(Denmark) Julius Dinesen	R G	6–7
(Spain) / Campos (Note: Cars No. 3, No. 9, No. 12 (Round 1) and No. 44 entered as Campos, cars No. 12 (Round 2 onwards), No. 19, No. 29 and No. 68 entered as Campos Racing.); (Spain) / Campos Racing	3	(Mexico) Jesse Carrasquedo Jr.	R	1, 6–7
(Spain) / Campos; (Spain) / Campos Racing	9	(Austria) Charlie Wurz		2
(Spain) / Campos; (Spain) / Campos Racing	12	(Bulgaria) Nikola Tsolov	R	All
(Spain) / Campos; (Spain) / Campos Racing	19	(Serbia) Filip Jenić		1–5
(Spain) / Campos; (Spain) / Campos Racing	29	(Denmark) Georg Kelstrup		All
(Spain) / Campos; (Spain) / Campos Racing	44	(Portugal) Manuel Espírito Santo		3–7
(Spain) / Campos; (Spain) / Campos Racing	68	(Australia) Hugh Barter		All
(Spain) / Campos; (Spain) / Campos Racing	75	(Denmark) Noah Strømsted	R G	6–7
(Spain) Monlau Motorsport	4	(Norway) Martinius Stenshorne		5
(Spain) Monlau Motorsport	25	(Belgium) Jef Machiels		All
(Spain) Monlau Motorsport	31	(Netherlands) Niels Koolen	G	6
(Spain) Monlau Motorsport	41	(Germany) Jonas Ried	G	7
(Spain) Monlau Motorsport	46	(Netherlands) Robert de Haan		All
(Spain) GRS Team	5	(Brazil) Ricardo Gracia Filho	R	1–4, 6–7
(Spain) GRS Team	15	(Slovakia) Lukáš Málek	R	1
(Spain) GRS Team	26	(Spain) Vladislav Ryabov		All
(Spain) GRS Team	72	(Australia) Marcos Flack		4, 6–7
(Spain) GRS Team	99	(United Kingdom) Daniel Mavlyutov		5–7
(France) Saintéloc Racing	6	(France) Théophile Naël	R	4–7
(France) Saintéloc Racing	22	(Thailand) Carl Bennett	R G	7
(France) Saintéloc Racing	27	(Switzerland) Ethan Ischer		4
(France) Saintéloc Racing	34	(Denmark) Theodor Jensen	R	5–7
(Netherlands) / MP Motorsport (Note: Cars No. 7, No. 14, No. 23 and No. 55 entered as MP Motorsport, cars No. 24, No. 35, No. 51 and No. 52 entered as MP Motorsports.); (Netherlands) / MP Motorsports	7	(Poland) Tymoteusz Kucharczyk	R	All
(Netherlands) / MP Motorsport; (Netherlands) / MP Motorsports	14	(Thailand) Tasanapol Inthraphuvasak		All
(Netherlands) / MP Motorsport; (Netherlands) / MP Motorsports	23	(Kyrgyzstan) Kirill Smal		All
(Netherlands) / MP Motorsport; (Netherlands) / MP Motorsports	24	(Spain) Miron Pingasov		All
(Netherlands) / MP Motorsport; (Netherlands) / MP Motorsports	35	(Denmark) Sebastian Gravlund	R	All
(Netherlands) / MP Motorsport; (Netherlands) / MP Motorsports	51	(Singapore) Christian Ho		All
(Netherlands) / MP Motorsport; (Netherlands) / MP Motorsports	52	(Morocco) Suleiman Zanfari		1–5
(Netherlands) / MP Motorsport; (Netherlands) / MP Motorsports	55	(Italy) Valerio Rinicella		All
(Spain) Teo Martín Motorsport	10	(France) Lola Lovinfosse	F	1–4
(Spain) Teo Martín Motorsport	13	(Spain) Daniel Nogales	R	1–4
(Spain) Teo Martín Motorsport	28	(Spain) Daniel Maciá		3
(Spain) Teo Martín Motorsport	44	(Portugal) Manuel Espírito Santo		1–2
(Italy) Cram-Pinnacle	33	(India) Anshul Gandhi		1–4
(Italy) Cram-Pinnacle	77	(Mexico) Ricardo Escotto		1–6
(Italy) Cram-Pinnacle	78	(Australia) Gianmarco Pradel	R G	7
(Italy) Cram-Pinnacle	80	(Argentina) Juan Francisco Soldavini	R G	7
(Italy) Cram-Pinnacle	81	(Brazil) Nelson Neto	R	4
(United Kingdom) JHR Developments	49	(United Kingdom) Daniel Guinchard	G	7
(United Kingdom) JHR Developments	71	(Australia) Noah Lisle	R	5, 7

Icon	Legend
R	Rookie
F	Female Trophy
G	Guest drivers ineligible to score points

- Andrea Frassineti was scheduled to compete for Cars Racing, but withdrew prior to the start of the season.
- Lola Lovinfosse was originally scheduled to compete for GRS Team, but switched to Teo Martín Motorsport prior to the start of the season.

== Race calendar and results ==
The calendar was announced on 3 December 2021. The five rounds in Spain were organized by the RFEDA. The season opener at Portimão was held in support of the Deutsche Tourenwagen Masters and the second abroad event took place at Circuit de Spa-Francorchamps.

Round		Circuit	Date	Pole position	Fastest lap	Winning driver	Winning team	Rookie winner	Supporting
1	R1	(Portugal) Algarve International Circuit, Portimão	30 April	(Bulgaria) Nikola Tsolov	(Bulgaria) Nikola Tsolov	(Australia) Hugh Barter	(Spain) Campos Racing	(Poland) Tymoteusz Kucharczyk	Deutsche Tourenwagen Masters; TCR Europe; GT-CER
1	R2	(Portugal) Algarve International Circuit, Portimão	1 May (Note: The 18-minute race was held after the second 25-minute race but is still considered Race 2, and the 25-minute Race 3.)	(Bulgaria) Nikola Tsolov	(Bulgaria) Nikola Tsolov	(Bulgaria) Nikola Tsolov	(Spain) Campos Racing	(Bulgaria) Nikola Tsolov	Deutsche Tourenwagen Masters; TCR Europe; GT-CER
1	R3	(Portugal) Algarve International Circuit, Portimão	1 May	(Thailand) Tasanapol Inthraphuvasak	(Bulgaria) Nikola Tsolov	(Thailand) Tasanapol Inthraphuvasak	(Netherlands) MP Motorsport	(Poland) Tymoteusz Kucharczyk	Deutsche Tourenwagen Masters; TCR Europe; GT-CER
2	R1	(Spain) Circuito de Jerez, Jerez de la Frontera	28 May	(Bulgaria) Nikola Tsolov	(Bulgaria) Nikola Tsolov	(Poland) Tymoteusz Kucharczyk	(Netherlands) MP Motorsport	(Poland) Tymoteusz Kucharczyk	RFEDA Racing Weekend
2	R2	(Spain) Circuito de Jerez, Jerez de la Frontera	29 May	(Bulgaria) Nikola Tsolov	(Bulgaria) Nikola Tsolov	(Bulgaria) Nikola Tsolov	(Spain) Campos Racing	(Bulgaria) Nikola Tsolov	RFEDA Racing Weekend
2	R3	(Spain) Circuito de Jerez, Jerez de la Frontera	29 May	(Bulgaria) Nikola Tsolov	(Bulgaria) Nikola Tsolov	(Bulgaria) Nikola Tsolov	(Spain) Campos Racing	(Bulgaria) Nikola Tsolov	RFEDA Racing Weekend
3	R1	(Spain) Circuit Ricardo Tormo, Cheste	11 June	(Bulgaria) Nikola Tsolov	(Bulgaria) Nikola Tsolov	(Bulgaria) Nikola Tsolov	(Spain) Campos Racing	(Bulgaria) Nikola Tsolov	RFEDA Racing Weekend
3	R2	(Spain) Circuit Ricardo Tormo, Cheste	12 June	(Bulgaria) Nikola Tsolov	(Bulgaria) Nikola Tsolov	(Bulgaria) Nikola Tsolov	(Spain) Campos Racing	(Bulgaria) Nikola Tsolov	RFEDA Racing Weekend
3	R3	(Spain) Circuit Ricardo Tormo, Cheste	12 June	(Australia) Hugh Barter	(Bulgaria) Nikola Tsolov	(Bulgaria) Nikola Tsolov	(Spain) Campos Racing	(Bulgaria) Nikola Tsolov	RFEDA Racing Weekend
4	R1	(Belgium) Circuit de Spa-Francorchamps, Stavelot	8 July	(Bulgaria) Nikola Tsolov	(Bulgaria) Nikola Tsolov	(Bulgaria) Nikola Tsolov	(Spain) Campos Racing	(Bulgaria) Nikola Tsolov	25 Hours VW Fun Cup
4	R2	(Belgium) Circuit de Spa-Francorchamps, Stavelot	9 July	(Bulgaria) Nikola Tsolov	(Australia) Hugh Barter	(Bulgaria) Nikola Tsolov	(Spain) Campos Racing	(Bulgaria) Nikola Tsolov	25 Hours VW Fun Cup
4	R3	(Belgium) Circuit de Spa-Francorchamps, Stavelot	9 July	(Bulgaria) Nikola Tsolov	(Bulgaria) Nikola Tsolov	(Bulgaria) Nikola Tsolov	(Spain) Campos Racing	(Bulgaria) Nikola Tsolov	25 Hours VW Fun Cup
5	R1	(Spain) MotorLand Aragón, Alcañiz	3 September	(Bulgaria) Nikola Tsolov	(Bulgaria) Nikola Tsolov	(Australia) Hugh Barter	(Spain) Campos Racing	(Bulgaria) Nikola Tsolov	RFEDA Racing Weekend
5	R2	(Spain) MotorLand Aragón, Alcañiz	4 September	(Bulgaria) Nikola Tsolov	(Bulgaria) Nikola Tsolov	(Bulgaria) Nikola Tsolov	(Spain) Campos Racing	(Bulgaria) Nikola Tsolov	RFEDA Racing Weekend
5	R3	(Spain) MotorLand Aragón, Alcañiz	4 September	(Australia) Hugh Barter	(Bulgaria) Nikola Tsolov	(Australia) Hugh Barter	(Spain) Campos Racing	(Poland) Tymoteusz Kucharczyk	RFEDA Racing Weekend
6	R1	(Spain) Circuito de Navarra, Los Arcos	1 October	(Australia) Hugh Barter	(Australia) Hugh Barter	(Australia) Hugh Barter	(Spain) Campos Racing	(Bulgaria) Nikola Tsolov	RFEDA Racing Weekend
6	R2	(Spain) Circuito de Navarra, Los Arcos	2 October	(Australia) Hugh Barter	(Australia) Hugh Barter	(Australia) Hugh Barter	(Spain) Campos Racing	(Bulgaria) Nikola Tsolov	RFEDA Racing Weekend
6	R3	(Spain) Circuito de Navarra, Los Arcos	2 October	(Denmark) Noah Strømsted	(Australia) Hugh Barter	(Australia) Hugh Barter	(Spain) Campos Racing	(Poland) Tymoteusz Kucharczyk	RFEDA Racing Weekend
7	R1	(Spain) Circuit de Barcelona-Catalunya, Montmeló	12 November	(Bulgaria) Nikola Tsolov	(Bulgaria) Nikola Tsolov	(Bulgaria) Nikola Tsolov	(Spain) Campos Racing	(Bulgaria) Nikola Tsolov	RFEDA Racing Weekend
7	R2	(Spain) Circuit de Barcelona-Catalunya, Montmeló	13 November	(Bulgaria) Nikola Tsolov	(Bulgaria) Nikola Tsolov	(Bulgaria) Nikola Tsolov	(Spain) Campos Racing	(Bulgaria) Nikola Tsolov	RFEDA Racing Weekend
7	R3	(Spain) Circuit de Barcelona-Catalunya, Montmeló	13 November	(Bulgaria) Nikola Tsolov	(Bulgaria) Nikola Tsolov	(Bulgaria) Nikola Tsolov	(Spain) Campos Racing	(Bulgaria) Nikola Tsolov	RFEDA Racing Weekend

== Championship standings ==
Points are awarded to the top ten classified finishers in 25-minute races and for the top eight classified finishers in 18-minute races.

Races	Position, points per race											
Races	**1st**	**2nd**	**3rd**	**4th**	**5th**	**6th**	**7th**	**8th**	**9th**	**10th**	**Pole**	**FL**
25-minute races	25	18	15	12	10	8	6	4	2	1	2	1
18-minute races	15	12	10	8	6	4	2	1				1

=== Drivers' championship ===
Pos	Driver	ALG (Portugal)			JER (Spain)			CRT (Spain)			SPA (Belgium)			ARA (Spain)			NAV (Spain)			CAT (Spain)			Pts
1	(Bulgaria) Nikola Tsolov	**14**	**1**	5	**2**	**1**	**1**	**1**	**1**	1	**1**	**1**	**1**	**2**	**1**	4	3	2	3	**1**	**1**	**1**	400
2	(Australia) Hugh Barter	1	4	4	10	6	3	18	7	**13**	2	2	2	1	3	**1**	**1**	**1**	1	5	2	3	287
3	(Poland) Tymoteusz Kucharczyk	3	2	3	1	2	24	3	14	2	Ret	16	8	5	2	2	4	4	2	3	3	6	227
4	(Kyrgyzstan) Kirill Smal	9	7	11	6	5	8	7	5	3	4	3	13	3	Ret	3	2	3	23†	2	4	2	173
5	(Denmark) Georg Kelstrup	7	11	9	5	4	2	Ret	8	4	5	5	4	7	11	Ret	10	19	9	14	6	8	105
6	(Italy) Valerio Rinicella	25	8	7	4	3	16	10	13	10	3	4	21	Ret	6	5	6	7	4	10	10	5	104
7	(Morocco) Suleiman Zanfari	5	3	6	14	15	4	6	6	17	10	13	5	Ret	8	7							70
8	(Serbia) Filip Jenić	6	13	2	8	9	7	5	4	9	13	11	11	17	4	14							64
9	(Thailand) Tasanapol Inthraphuvasak	2	5	**1**	12	8	12	8	11	11	12	8	23	Ret	15	17	Ret	16	21	9	8	15	63
10	(Netherlands) Robert de Haan	11	6	Ret	7	10	10	9	10	14	6	6	3	4	Ret	8	9	11	Ret	12	9	29	61
11	(France) Gaël Julien	8	Ret	15	11	11	5	4	2	8	8	9	10	19†	14	19	5	8	10	Ret	14	12	60
12	(Portugal) Manuel Espírito Santo	17	14	Ret	13	13	Ret	2	3	5	7	7	9	Ret	7	22†	13	13	16	7	16	10	59
13	(Singapore) Christian Ho	10	12	27†	9	14	14	16	15	7	9	14	18	Ret	9	10	14	14	5	4	7	4	50
14	(Spain) Daniel Nogales	20	16	10	21	Ret	26†	14	23	15	20	29	Ret	10	10	11	7	6	7	8	15	11	26
15	(Austria) Charlie Wurz				3	7	6																25
16	(Spain) Bruno del Pino	15	9	28†	16	12	9	12	12	6	11	10	7	Ret	13	12	15	12	6	Ret	17	18	24
17	(Norway) Martinius Stenshorne													6	5	6							22
18	(Spain) Miron Pingasov	4	15	8	Ret	22	15	Ret	Ret	16	Ret	21	25	Ret	Ret	15	18	17	Ret	17	13	14	16
19	(France) Théophile Naël										24	12	Ret	8	23	21†	11	10	8	15	11	9	11
20	(Australia) Marcos Flack										Ret	20	6				20	24	Ret	22	23	16	8
21	(Denmark) Sebastian Gravlund	13	20	12	Ret	17	22	11	26	23	19	Ret	19	16	17	Ret	12	9	22	11	12	7	8
22	(Mexico) Ricardo Escotto	16	Ret	26	20	18	17	17	25	Ret	Ret	15	Ret	9	12	9	Ret	Ret	EX				4
23	(Spain) Max Mayer	18	21	17	18	16	25	20	9	18	Ret	18	16	11	21	18	19	15	11	Ret	26	19	0
24	(Spain) Maksim Arkhangelskiy	12	10	13	Ret	Ret	13	15	18	21	Ret	23	14	14	16	16	16	18	Ret	21	30	22	0
25	(Spain) Álvaro García	19	19	22	Ret	20	11	Ret	16	24†	22	Ret	22	Ret	25†	Ret	25	25	19	20	Ret	20	0
26	(Belgium) Jef Machiels	24	Ret	19	15	24	23	13	17	22	14	17	27†	12	18	23†	17	28†	12	Ret	24	13	0
27	(Spain) Vladislav Ryabov	26	Ret	14	17	19	20	21	22	Ret	Ret	19	12	18†	19	13	Ret	20	13	23	20	Ret	0
28	(India) Anshul Gandhi	27	24	21	Ret	21	19	19	20	12	15	27	26										0
29	(Australia) Noah Lisle	29	18	20										13	24	Ret				16	Ret	24	0
30	(Denmark) Theodor Jensen													15	20	20	23	22	14	26	22	Ret	0
31	(Brazil) Ricardo Gracia Filho	22	Ret	18	Ret	Ret	18	23	24	19	18	24	15				22	27†	15	18	25	21	0
32	(Mexico) Jesse Carrasquedo Jr.	23	23	16													24	23	Ret	29†	21	23	0
33	(Brazil) Nelson Neto										16	25	Ret										0
34	(Switzerland) Ethan Ischer										17	26	17										0
35	(Slovakia) Lukáš Málek	21	17	23																			0
36	(United Kingdom) Daniel Mavlyutov													Ret	22	Ret	27	26	17	27	27	26	0
37	(France) Lola Lovinfosse	28†	22	25	19	23	21	22	19	Ret	21	22	20										0
38	(Spain) Daniel Maciá							Ret	21	20													0
39	(Brazil) Aurelia Nobels										23	28	24										0
40	(Mexico) Jorge Campos	Ret	Ret	24																			0
Guest drivers ineligible to score points
–	(Denmark) Noah Strømsted																8	5	**Ret**	6	5	30†	–
–	(Germany) Jonas Ried																			13	29	25	–
–	(United Kingdom) Daniel Guinchard																			Ret	19	17	–
–	(Australia) Gianmarco Pradel																			19	18	28	–
–	(Denmark) Julius Dinesen																21	29	18	WD	WD	WD	–
–	(Netherlands) Niels Koolen																26	21	20				–
–	(Thailand) Carl Bennett																			24	Ret	Ret	–
–	(Argentina) Juan Francisco Soldavini																			25	28	Ret	–
–	(Italy) Victoria Blokhina																			28	Ret	27	–
Pos	Driver	ALG (Portugal)			JER (Spain)			CRT (Spain)			SPA (Belgium)			ARA (Spain)			NAV (Spain)			CAT (Spain)			Pts

Colour	Result
Gold	Winner
Silver	Second place
Bronze	Third place
Green	Points classification
Blue	Non-points classification
Blue	Non-classified finish (NC)
Purple	Retired, not classified (Ret)
Red	Did not qualify (DNQ)
Red	Did not pre-qualify (DNPQ)
Black	Disqualified (DSQ)
White	Did not start (DNS)
White	Withdrew (WD)
White	Race cancelled (C)
Blank	Did not practice (DNP)
Blank	Did not arrive (DNA)
Blank	Excluded (EX)

**Bold** – Pole
Italics – Fastest Lap
† — Did not finish but classified

=== Secondary Classes' standings ===
Pos	Driver	ALG (Portugal)			JER (Spain)			CRT (Spain)			SPA (Belgium)			ARA (Spain)			NAV (Spain)			CAT (Spain)			Pts
Rookie Trophy
1	(Bulgaria) Nikola Tsolov	3	1	2	2	1	1	1	1	1	1	1	1	1	1	2	1	1	2	1	1	1	417
2	(Poland) Tymoteusz Kucharczyk	1	2	1	1	2	6	2	4	2	Ret	4	3	2	2	1	2	2	1	2	2	2	332
3	(Spain) Bruno del Pino	4	3	11†	3	3	2	4	3	3	2	2	2	Ret	4	4	7	7	3	Ret	7	6	209
4	(Spain) Daniel Nogales	7	4	3	5	Ret	8†	5	6	4	6	9	Ret	4	3	3	3	4	4	4	6	5	182
5	(Denmark) Sebastian Gravlund	2	8	4	Ret	5	5	3	8	7	5	Ret	6	7	5	Ret	6	5	11	5	5	3	153
6	(Spain) Max Mayer	5	9	7	4	4	7	6	2	5	Ret	5	5	5	7	5	8	8	6	Ret	11	7	132
7	(France) Théophile Naël										9	3	Ret	3	8	7†	5	6	5	6	4	4	94
8	(Brazil) Ricardo Gracia Filho	9	Ret	6	Ret	Ret	4	7	7	6	4	6	4				10	12†	8	7	11	9	84
9	(Spain) Álvaro García	6	7	9	Ret	6	3	Ret	5	8†	7	Ret	7	Ret	9†	Ret	13	11	10	9	Ret	8	65
10	(Denmark) Theodor Jensen													6	6	6	11	9	7	12	10	Ret	34
11	(Brazil) Nelson Neto										3	7	Ret										17
12	(Mexico) Jesse Carrasquedo Jr.	10	10	5													12	10	Ret	13†	9	10	17
13	(Slovakia) Lukáš Málek	8	5	10																			11
14	(Brazil) Aurelia Nobels										8	8	8										9
15	(Australia) Noah Lisle	11	6	8																			8
Guest drivers ineligible to score points
–	(Denmark) Noah Strømsted																4	3	Ret	3	3	12†	–
–	(Australia) Gianmarco Pradel																			8	8	11	–
–	(Denmark) Julius Dinesen																9	13	9	WD	WD	WD	–
–	(Thailand) Carl Bennett																			10	Ret	Ret	–
–	(Argentina) Juan Francisco Soldavini																			11	12	Ret	–
Female Trophy (TBC)
1	(France) Lola Lovinfosse	1†	1	1	1	1	1	1	1	Ret	1	1	1										65
2	(Brazil) Aurelia Nobels										2	2	2										48
Guest drivers ineligible to score points
–	(Italy) Victoria Blokhina																			1	Ret	1	–
Pos	Driver	ALG (Portugal)			JER (Spain)			CRT (Spain)			SPA (Belgium)			ARA (Spain)			NAV (Spain)			CAT (Spain)			Pts

Colour	Result
Gold	Winner
Silver	Second place
Bronze	Third place
Green	Points classification
Blue	Non-points classification
Blue	Non-classified finish (NC)
Purple	Retired, not classified (Ret)
Red	Did not qualify (DNQ)
Red	Did not pre-qualify (DNPQ)
Black	Disqualified (DSQ)
White	Did not start (DNS)
White	Withdrew (WD)
White	Race cancelled (C)
Blank	Did not practice (DNP)
Blank	Did not arrive (DNA)
Blank	Excluded (EX)

**Bold** – Pole
Italics – Fastest Lap
† — Did not finish but classified

=== Teams' standings ===
Two best finishers score points for their team. Bonus points are not counted.

Pos	Driver	Points
1	(Spain) Campos Racing	687
2	(Netherlands) MP Motorsport	494
3	(Netherlands) MP Motorsports	141
4	(Spain) Drivex School	104
5	(Spain) Campos	100
6	(Spain) Monlau Motorsport	83
7	(France) Saintéloc Racing	11
8	(Spain) GRS Team	8
9	(Italy) Cram-Pinnacle	4
10	(Spain) Teo Martín Motorsport	1
11	(Spain) Fórmula de Campeones	0
12	(United Kingdom) JHR Developments	0
