= Valentin Hasse-Clot =

French racing driver (born 1996)

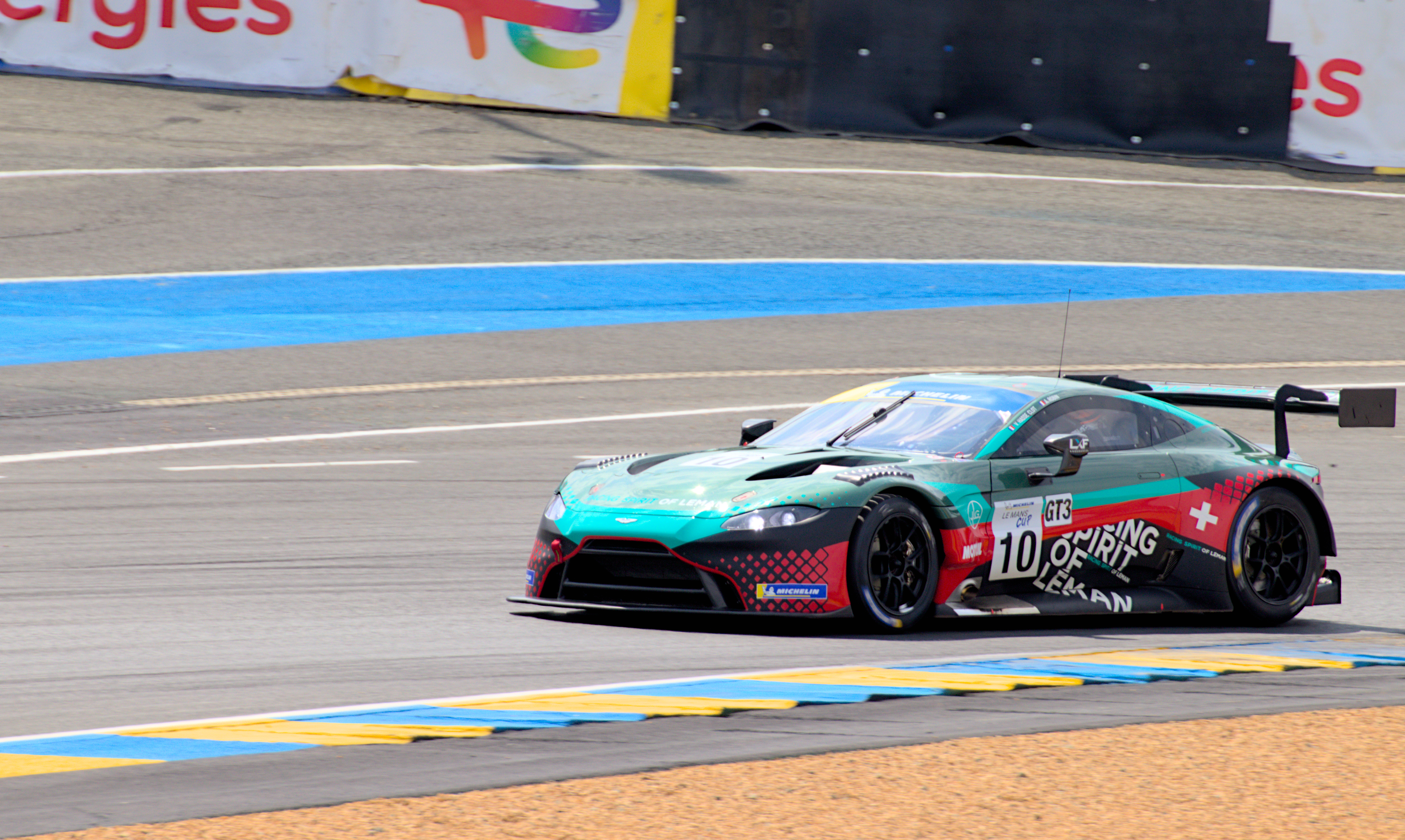
- Nationality: (France) French
- Born: 27 February 1996 (age 30) Paris, France

European Le Mans Series career
- Debut season: 2023
- Current team: Racing Spirit of Léman
- Categorisation: FIA Silver (until 2021); FIA Gold (2022–)
- Car number: 59
- Former teams: TF Sport
- Starts: 23
- Wins: 1
- Podiums: 3
- Poles: 3
- Fastest laps: 1
- Best finish: 3rd (LMGT3) in 2024, 2025

Championship titles
- 2020 2021 2023: GT4 European Series - Silver Cup; French GT4 Cup - Silver Cup; Le Mans Cup - GT3
- Statistics up to date as of 20 October 2026.

Valentin Hasse-Clot (born 27 February 1996) is a French racing driver who competes in the European Le Mans Series for Racing Spirit of Léman.

Hasse-Clot is a champion of the Silver class in both the GT4 European Series and French GT4 Cup in 2020 and 2021, respectively. In 2023, he won the GT3 title in the Le Mans Cup for Racing Spirit of Léman. As of 2026, Hasse-Clot is an Aston Martin Racing factory driver.

== Career ==
=== Early career ===
Hasse-Clot's motorsport career began at the age of six, where he competed on his family's karting track in Vaudoy-en-Brie. He graduated to local karting competitions in 2009, receiving mentorship from Henri Pescarolo, and continued into national karting competitions through 2013.

In 2014, Hasse-Clot graduated to single-seaters, taking part in the 2014 French F4 Championship. In his opening season of formula racing, he claimed two podium finishes – at Magny-Cours and Nogaro – en route to a tenth-place finish in the championship. At the end of the season, Hasse-Clot was quoted as saying that he aimed to step up to Formula Renault 2.0 competition for 2015.

=== Single-seaters ===
Hasse-Clot graduated to Formula Renault competition in 2015, beginning the season with Strakka Racing in both the Eurocup and Northern European Cup competitions. After claiming a podium in the opening NEC round at Monza, Hasse-Clot was left without a ride following Strakka placing their Formula Renault 2.0 program on hold for the year. He continued in Eurocup with Manor MP Motorsport at Spa and the Hungaroring, before switching again to Fortec Motorsport to complete the season. Hasse-Clot had tested with Fortec prior to the 2015 season, but joined Strakka due to a lack of available seats at Fortec. Through the 17-race season, Hasse-Clot earned a best finish of ninth, scoring just two championship points.

In 2016, Hasse-Clot returned to Formula 4 competition, taking part in the Italian F4 Championship with Kiteviola Motorsport. However, he would only take part in the first two rounds at Misano and Adria, finishing as high as fifth. Following his campaign, Hasse-Clot stated that he realized he wouldn't have the budget to continue to progress through the single-seater ladder, leading him to pursue a career in sports car racing.

=== Sports car racing ===
During 2016, Hasse-Clot made his endurance racing debut, competing in the Spa 24 Hours for Saintéloc Racing. He drove in the Am class alongside Michael Blanchemain, Jean-Paul Buffin, and Gilles Lallemant, finishing 51st overall. At the end of the year, he took part in a shootout-style competition at Circuit Paul Ricard, looking to earn a €30,000 scholarship and support for the 2017 Porsche Carrera Cup France season. At the end of the weekend, Hasse-Clot was named Espoir Porsche Carrera Cup France, earning support from a local Porsche dealership alongside tires and a cash bonus for the coming season.

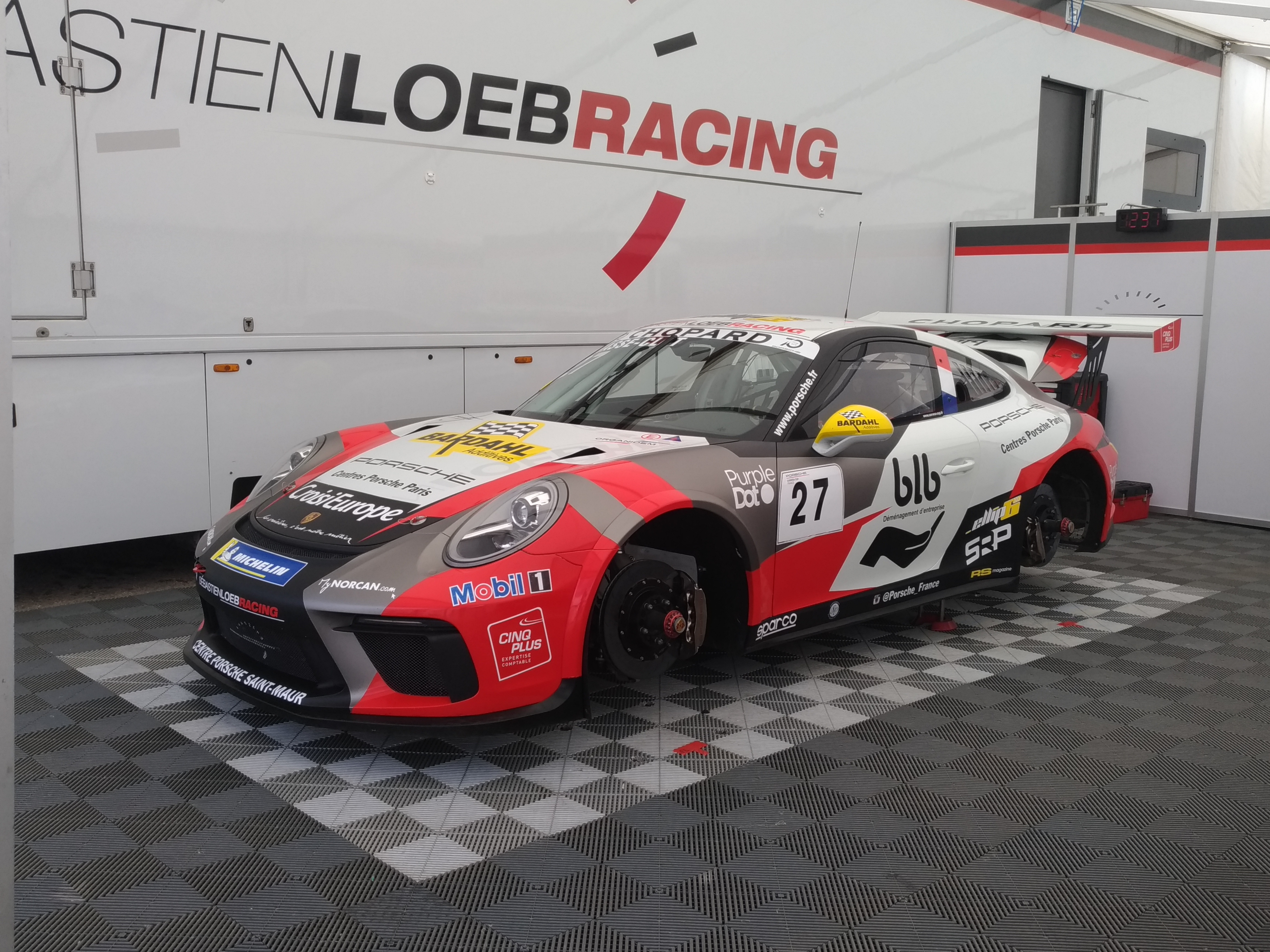
Hasse-Clot's Porsche 911 GT3 Cup in 2018.

For 2017, Hasse-Clot joined Sébastien Loeb Racing, taking part in a full-season campaign with the team. His immediate goal was to graduate through the Porsche pyramid, and he aimed to work towards a ride in the Porsche Supercup in 2018. In his opening season of Porsche Cup competition, Hasse-Clot claimed a sole race victory at Barcelona, finishing fifth in the championship and claiming Rookie of the Year honors. Hasse-Clot returned to the team in 2018, joined by teammate Jérémy Sarhy. The season proved a pivotal one for Hasse-Clot, as he stated that his budget would likely prevent him from funding a 2019 campaign if he didn't receive financial support. Despite a difficult start to the season, Hasse-Clot rebounded to finish fifth in the drivers championship. Later in the season, he took part in a one-off weekend in the Porsche Carrera Cup Great Britain, driving for Motorbase Performance.

==== Aston Martin Racing ====
In 2019, Hasse-Clot began competing in Aston Martin machinery, beginning with a part-time program in the ADAC GT Masters, driving for PROpeak Performance. After only competing in the first two race weekends of the season, Hasse-Clot made his British GT Championship debut later in the year, driving for the Beechdean AMR team.

Hasse-Clot returned to a full-time program the following year, lining up for Garage 59 in the GT World Challenge Europe Endurance Cup and AGS Events in the GT4 European Series. In the former series, Hasse-Clot and co-drivers Andrew Watson and James Pull claimed a Silver Cup class victory at the Nürburgring, as Hasse-Clot and Watson finished fourth in the class championship. In GT4, Hasse-Clot and Théo Nouet claimed four class and two overall victories, taking the Silver Cup title at season's end. At the end of the 2020 season, Hasse-Clot was named as a graduate from the Aston Martin Racing Driver Academy, receiving both career and financial assistance from the Aston Martin factory throughout the 2021 season. The first non-British driver to obtain the accolade, Hasse-Clot stated that it was his goal from day one to progress through the ranks within the manufacturer's programs.

Hasse-Clot began the 2021 season with a drive in the Asian Le Mans Series, where he claimed a sole podium alongside Maxime Martin and Alexander West, finishing fifth in the GT class championship. He also continued full-time in GT World Challenge, driving again for Garage 59. Hasse-Clot's entry scored a class pole at Paul Ricard and a podium at Spa, but finished 14th in the Silver Cup. He also competed full-time in the FFSA GT Championship, winning the Silver title alongside Romain Leroux.

Hasse-Clot's Aston Martin Vantage GT3 in 2022.

Ahead of the 2022 season, Hasse-Clot officially became an Aston Martin factory driver, becoming the first French driver to race in a factory role for the brand since Frédéric Makowiecki in 2013. In line with his factory duties, Hasse-Clot lined up for the brand's customers throughout the season, beginning with a GT World Challenge Europe Endurance Cup drive with Beechdean AMR alongside Nouet and Andrew Howard. However, Hasse-Clot would only participate in the first two races, shifting focus towards the Le Mans Cup, where he claimed two podiums in four races alongside co-driver Stephen Pattrick. He also returned to the FFSA GT Championship, claiming four podiums in ten races for Mirage Racing.

In 2023, Hasse-Clot made his LM GTE debut, taking part in the full European Le Mans Series season for TF Sport, joining brothers Arnold and Maxime Robin. Later that season, the trio competed in the 2023 24 Hours of Le Mans, marking Hasse-Clot's long-awaited debut in the race, 19 years after he first attended it as a spectator. However, the team wouldn't finish the race, retiring after 58 laps due to an accident. Hasse-Clot continued to pair full-time with Arnold Robin in the Le Mans Cup, driving for reigning LMP3-class champions Racing Spirit of Léman. The duo claimed a GT3-class victory at Barcelona, adding four additional podiums during the season en route to the series title.

Hasse-Clot also competed part time in the GT World Challenge America, deputizing for Ross Gunn in TRG-AMR's Pro-Am entry. In his first weekend of competition at NOLA Motorsports Park, Hasse-Clot claimed a maiden pole position and two class podiums alongside co-driver Derek DeBoer. Despite missing four of the thirteen total races, Hasse-Clot finished fifth in the Pro-Am championship, while DeBoer took third.

== Racing record ==
=== Career summary ===
Season	Series	Team	Races	Wins	Poles	F/Laps	Podiums	Points	Position
2014	French F4 Championship	Auto Sport Academy	21	0	0	1	2	83	10th
2015	Formula Renault 2.0 Eurocup	Strakka Racing	3	0	0	0	0	2	19th
2015	Formula Renault 2.0 Eurocup	Manor MP Motorsport	4	0	0	0	0	2	19th
2015	Formula Renault 2.0 Eurocup	Fortec Motorsports	10	0	0	0	0	2	19th
2015	Formula Renault 2.0 NEC	Strakka Racing	2	0	0	0	1	28	26th
2016	Italian F4 Championship	Kiteviola Motorsport	6	0	0	0	0	16	24th
2016	Blancpain GT Series Endurance Cup	Saintéloc Racing	1	0	0	0	0	0	NC
2016	Blancpain GT Series Endurance Cup - Am	Saintéloc Racing	1	0	0	0	0	15	26th
2017	Porsche Carrera Cup France	Sébastien Loeb Racing	11	1	0	2	1	124	5th
2017	Nürburgring Endurance Series - CUP5	Walkenhorst Motorsport	2	0	0	0	0	10	32nd
2018	Porsche Carrera Cup France	Sébastien Loeb Racing	12	1	?	?	3	123	5th
2018	Porsche GT3 Cup Challenge Benelux - Cup	Sébastien Loeb Racing	2	1	0	0	1	0	NC†
2018	Porsche Carrera Cup Great Britain - Pro	Motorbase Performance	2	0	0	0	0	2	11th
2019	ADAC GT Masters	PROpeak Performance	4	0	0	0	0	0	NC
2019	Blancpain GT Series Endurance Cup	Attempto Racing	1	0	0	0	0	1	34th
2019	British GT Championship - GT3	Beechdean AMR	2	0	0	0	0	6	21st
2020	GT World Challenge Europe Endurance Cup	Garage 59	4	0	0	0	0	0	NC
2020	GT World Challenge Europe Endurance Cup - Silver Cup	Garage 59	4	1	0	0	2	58	4th
2020	GT4 European Series - Silver	AGS Events	12	4	3	2	7	184	**1st**
2021	Asian Le Mans Series - GT	Garage 59	4	0	0	0	1	35	5th
2021	GT World Challenge Europe Endurance Cup	Garage 59	5	0	0	0	0	0	NC
2021	GT World Challenge Europe Endurance Cup - Silver Cup	Garage 59	5	0	1	0	1	32	14th
2021	French GT4 Cup - Silver	AGS Events	12	4	?	?	9	209	**1st**
2021	GT4 America Series - Pro-Am	WR Racing	2	0	1	0	1	15	18th
2022	GT World Challenge Europe Endurance Cup	Beechdean AMR	2	0	0	0	0	0	NC
2022	GT World Challenge Europe Endurance Cup - Gold	Beechdean AMR	2	0	0	1	0	4	27th
2022	French GT4 Cup - Pro-Am	Mirage Racing	10	0	0	0	4	84	7th
2022	Le Mans Cup - GT3	Bullitt Racing	4	0	1	3	2	42	8th
2023	Asian Le Mans Series - GT	Bullitt Racing	4	0	0	0	0	0	21st
2023	European Le Mans Series - LMGTE	TF Sport	6	0	1	0	0	28	10th
2023	24 Hours of Le Mans - LMGTE Am	TF Sport	1	0	0	0	0	N/A	DNF
2023	Le Mans Cup - GT3	Racing Spirit of Léman	7	1	1	0	5	97	**1st**
2023	GT World Challenge America - Pro-Am	TRG-AMR	9	0	1	1	4	124	5th
2023	GT4 European Series - Pro-Am	GPA Racing	2	0	0	0	1	25	19th
2023	Michelin Pilot Challenge - GS	van der Steur Racing	1	0	0	0	0	190	54th
2024	European Le Mans Series - LMGT3	Racing Spirit of Léman	6	0	1	0	2	66	**3rd**
2024	Le Mans Cup - GT3	Racing Spirit of Léman	2	0	1	0	0	0	NC†
2024	Michelin Pilot Challenge - GS	van der Steur Racing	5	0	0	0	2	1380	20th
2024	GT World Challenge Europe Endurance Cup	Walkenhorst Racing	1	0	0	0	0	0	NC
2025	FIA World Endurance Championship - LMGT3	Racing Spirit of Léman	8	0	2	1	1	32	15th
2025	European Le Mans Series - LMGT3	Racing Spirit of Léman	6	1	1	0	1	64	**3rd**
2025	IMSA SportsCar Championship - GTD	van der Steur Racing	5	0	0	1	0	991	30th
2025	GT World Challenge Europe Endurance Cup	Beechdean Motorsport	1	0	0	0	0	0	NC
2025	Le Mans Cup - GT3	Code Racing Development	1	0	0	0	0	8	13th
2026	IMSA SportsCar Championship - GTD	van der Steur Racing	3	0	0	0	0	1308	23rd
2026	IMSA SportsCar Championship - GTD	Car Blanche	2	0	0	0	2	1308	23rd
2026	IMSA SportsCar Championship - GTD Pro	Car Blanche	4	1	0	0	1	1134	14th
2026	European Le Mans Series - LMGT3	Racing Spirit of Léman	5	0	0	1	0	14	24th
2026	Le Mans Cup - GT3	Racing Spirit of Léman	5	2	0	2	3	88	4th
2026	24 Hours of Le Mans - LMGT3	Racing Spirit of Léman	1	0	0	0	0	N/A	11th
2026	GT World Challenge Europe Endurance Cup	Comtoyou Racing	1	0	0	0	0	0	NC
2026–27	Asian Le Mans Series - GT3	Car Blanche by RSL							

^{*} Season still in progress.

=== Complete French F4 Championship results ===
(key) (Races in bold indicate pole position) (Races in italics indicate fastest lap)

Year	1	2	3	4	5	6	7	8	9	10	11	12	13	14	15	16	17	18	19	20	21	Pos	Points
2014	LMS; 1; 13	LMS; 2; 6	LMS; 3; 9	PAU; 1 Ret	PAU; 2; 10	PAU; 3 Ret	VDV; 1; 10	VDV; 2 Ret	VDV; 3; 9	MAG; 1; 7	MAG; 2; 2	MAG; 3; 4	NOG; 1; 5	NOG; 2; 3	NOG; 3; 7	JER; 1; 11	JER; 2; 10	JER; 3; 14	LEC; 1 Ret	LEC; 2; 15	LEC; 3 Ret	10th	83

=== Complete Formula Renault 2.0 NEC results ===
(key) (Races in bold indicate pole position) (Races in italics indicate fastest lap)

Year	Entrant	1	2	3	4	5	6	7	8	9	10	11	12	13	14	15	16	DC	Points
2015	Strakka Racing	MNZ; 1; 13	MNZ; 2; 3	SIL; 1	SIL; 2	RBR; 1	RBR; 2	RBR; 3	SPA; 1	SPA; 2	ASS; 1	ASS; 2	NÜR; 1	NÜR; 2	HOC; 1	HOC; 2	HOC; 3	26th	28

=== Complete Formula Renault 2.0 Eurocup results ===
(key) (Races in bold indicate pole position) (Races in italics indicate fastest lap)

Year	Team	1	2	3	4	5	6	7	8	9	10	11	12	13	14	15	16	17	Pos	Points
2015	Manor MP Motorsport	ALC; 1; 19	ALC; 2; 14	ALC; 3 Ret	SPA; 1 Ret	SPA; 2 Ret	HUN; 1 Ret	HUN; 2; 20†	SIL; 1; 23	SIL; 2; 18	SIL; 3; 23	NÜR; 1 Ret	NÜR; 2; 28	LMS; 1; 9	LMS; 2; 12	JER; 1 Ret	JER; 2 Ret	JER; 3; 19	19th	2

=== Complete Italian F4 Championship results ===
(key) (Races in bold indicate pole position) (Races in italics indicate fastest lap)

Year	Team	1	2	3	4	5	6	7	8	9	10	11	12	13	14	15	16	17	18	19	20	21	22	23	Pos	Points
2016	Kiteviola Motorsport	MIS; 1	MIS; 2; 5	MIS; 3; 18	MIS; 4; 7	ADR; 1; 11	ADR; 2	ADR; 3 DSQ	ADR; 4 Ret	IMO1; 1	IMO1; 2	IMO1; 3	MUG; 1	MUG; 2	MUG; 3	VAL; 1	VAL; 2	VAL; 3	IMO2; 1	IMO2; 2	IMO2; 3	MNZ; 1	MNZ; 2	MNZ; 3	24th	16

=== Complete GT World Challenge Europe Endurance Cup results ===
(key) (Races in bold indicate pole position; races in italics indicate fastest lap)

Year	Team	Car	Class	1	2	3	4	5	6	7	Pos.	Points
2016	Saintéloc Racing	Audi R8 LMS ultra	Am	MNZ	SIL	LEC	SPA; 6H; 53	SPA; 12H; 56	SPA; 24H; 51	CAT	26th	15
2019	Attempto Racing	Audi R8 LMS Evo	Pro	MNZ	SIL	LEC	SPA; 6H	SPA; 12H	SPA; 24H	CAT; 10	34th	1
2020	Garage 59	Aston Martin Vantage AMR GT3	Silver	IMO; 14	NÜR; 12	SPA; 6H; 25	SPA; 12H; 44	SPA; 24H; Ret	LEC; Ret		4th	58
2021	Garage 59	Aston Martin Vantage AMR GT3	Silver	MNZ; 19	**LEC**; 27	SPA; 6H; 31	SPA; 12H; 22	SPA; 24H; 14	NÜR; 19	CAT; 30	14th	32
2022	Beechdean AMR	Aston Martin Vantage AMR GT3	Gold	IMO; Ret	LEC; 31	SPA; 6H	SPA; 12H	SPA; 24H	HOC	CAT	27th	4
2024	Walkenhorst Racing	Aston Martin Vantage AMR GT3 Evo	Pro	LEC	SPA; 6H	SPA; 12H	SPA; 24H	NÜR	MNZ; 23	JED	NC	0
2025	Beechdean Motorsport	Aston Martin Vantage AMR GT3 Evo	Pro-Am	LEC	MNZ	SPA; 6H; 24	SPA; 12H; 34	SPA; 24H; 32	NÜR	CAT	NC	0
2026	Comtoyou Racing	Aston Martin Vantage AMR GT3 Evo	Bronze	LEC	MNZ	SPA; 6H	SPA; 12H	SPA; 24H	NÜR	ALG; 38	NC‡	0‡

=== Complete Asian Le Mans Series results ===
(key) (Races in bold indicate pole position; races in italics indicate fastest lap)

Year	Team	Class	Car	Engine	1	2	3	4	Pos.	Points
2021	Garage 59	GT	Aston Martin Vantage AMR GT3	Aston Martin 4.0 L Turbo V8	DUB; 1; 5	DUB; 2; 3	ABU; 1; 6	ABU; 2; 9	5th	35
2023	Bullitt Racing	GT	Aston Martin Vantage AMR GT3	Aston Martin 4.0 L Turbo V8	DUB; 1 Ret	DUB; 2; 17	ABU; 1 Ret	ABU; 2; 13	21st	0

=== Complete Le Mans Cup results ===
(key) (Races in bold indicate pole position; races in italics indicate fastest lap)

Year	Entrant	Car	Class	1	2	3	4	5	6	7	Pos.	Points
2022	Bullitt Racing	Aston Martin Vantage AMR GT3	GT3	LEC	IMO	LMS; 1; 7	LMS; 2; 3	MNZ; 3	SPA; DNS	ALG	9th	30
2023	Racing Spirit of Léman	Aston Martin Vantage AMR GT3	GT3	**CAT**; 1	LMS; 1; 3	LMS; 2; 13	LEC; 2	ARA; 3	SPA; 5	ALG; 2	1st	97
2024	Racing Spirit of Léman	Aston Martin Vantage AMR GT3 Evo	GT3	CAT	LEC	**LMS**; **1**; 5	LMS; 2; 4	SPA	MUG	ALG	NC‡	0‡
2025	Code Racing Development	Aston Martin Vantage AMR GT3 Evo	GT3	CAT	LEC	LMS; 1	LMS; 2	SPA	SIL; 6	ALG	13th	8
2026	Racing Spirit of Léman	Aston Martin Vantage AMR GT3 Evo	GT3	CAT; 1	LEC; 3	LMS; 1	SPA	SIL; 9	ALG; 6		4th	88

^{*} Season still in progress.

=== Complete 24 Hours of Le Mans results ===
Year	Team	Co-Drivers	Car	Class	Laps	Pos.	Class Pos.
2023	(United Kingdom) TF Sport	(France) Arnold Robin (France) Maxime Robin	Aston Martin Vantage AMR GTE	LMGTE Am	58	DNF	DNF
2025	(France) Racing Spirit of Léman	(Brazil) Eduardo Barrichello (United States) Derek DeBoer	Aston Martin Vantage AMR GT3 Evo	LMGT3	336	45th	13th
2026	(France) Racing Spirit of Léman	(France) Marius Fossard (France) Clément Mateu	Aston Martin Vantage AMR GT3 Evo	LMGT3	332	43rd	11th

=== Complete European Le Mans Series results ===
(key) (Races in bold indicate pole position; races in italics indicate fastest lap)

Year	Team	Class	Car	Engine	1	2	3	4	5	6	Pos.	Points
2023	TF Sport	LMGTE	Aston Martin Vantage AMR GTE	Aston Martin M177 4.0 L Turbo V8	CAT; Ret	LEC; 7	ARA; 9	SPA; 6	**ALG**; 5	POR; 10	10th	28
2024	Racing Spirit of Léman	LMGT3	Aston Martin Vantage AMR GT3 Evo	Aston Martin M177 4.0 L Turbo V8	CAT; 6	LEC; 3	IMO; 2	SPA; 4	**MUG**; 5	POR; 9	3rd	66
2025	Racing Spirit of Léman	LMGT3	Aston Martin Vantage AMR GT3 Evo	Aston Martin M177 4.0 L Turbo V8	CAT; 7	**LEC**; 6	IMO; 7	SPA; 1	SIL; 6	POR; 5	3rd	64
2026	Racing Spirit of Léman	LMGT3	Aston Martin Vantage AMR GT3 Evo	Aston Martin M177 4.0 L Turbo V8	CAT; 10	LEC; 9	IMO; Ret	SPA	SIL; 10	ALG; 4	24nd	14

=== Complete IMSA SportsCar Championship results ===
(key) (Races in bold indicate pole position) (Races in italics indicate fastest lap)

Year	Team	Class	Make	Engine	1	2	3	4	5	6	7	8	9	10	11	Pos.	Points
2025	van der Steur Racing	GTD	Aston Martin Vantage AMR GT3 Evo	Aston Martin M177 4.0 L Turbo V8	DAY; 6	SEB; 15	LBH	LGA	WGL; 18	MOS	ELK	VIR	IMS; 15	PET; 11		30th	991
2026	van der Steur Racing	GTD	Aston Martin Vantage AMR GT3 Evo	Aston Martin M177 4.0 L Turbo V8	DAY; 11	SEB; 13	LBH; 8	LGA								23rd	1308
2026	Car Blanche	GTD	Aston Martin Vantage AMR GT3 Evo	Aston Martin M177 4.0 L Turbo V8						WGL; 3		ELK; 3				23rd	1308
2026	Car Blanche	GTD Pro	Aston Martin Vantage AMR GT3 Evo	Aston Martin M177 4.0 L Turbo V8					DET		MOS; 10		VIR; 4	IMS; 9	PET; 1	14th	1134

=== Complete FIA World Endurance Championship results ===
(key) (Races in bold indicate pole position; races in italics indicate fastest lap)

Year	Entrant	Class	Car	Engine	1	2	3	4	5	6	7	8	Rank	Points
2025	Racing Spirit of Léman	LMGT3	Aston Martin Vantage AMR GT3 Evo	Aston Martin M177 4.0 L Turbo V8	QAT; 9	IMO; 11	SPA; 6	LMS; 9	**SÃO**; 3	COA; 11	**FUJ**; 17	BHR; 14	15th	32

Sporting positions
Preceded by Simon Knap; Alec Udell	GT4 European Series; Silver Cup Champion; 2020; With: Théo Nouet	Succeeded by Charlie Fagg; Bailey Voisin
Preceded by Ricardo van der Ende; Benjamin Lessennes	French GT4 Cup; Silver Cup Champion; 2021; With: Romain Leroux	Succeeded by Roee Meyuhas; Erwan Bastard
