= Timothé Buret =

French racing driver (born 1995)

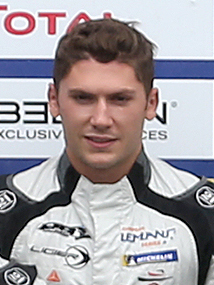
- Buret in 2018
- Nationality: (France) French
- Born: Timothé Arnaud Buret; 31 May 1995 (age 31) Montpellier, France
- Categorisation: FIA Silver

Timothé Arnaud Buret (born 31 May 1995) is a French racing driver who last competed for Switch Racing in the European Endurance Prototype Cup.

== Career ==
Buret made his car racing debut in 2013, racing in the V de V Challenge Monoplace and V de V Challenge Endurance Proto series for Equipe Palmyr. In 2014, Buret returned to both series, finishing runner-up in the Challenge Endurance Proto series and fifth in the Monoplace championship. During 2014, Buret also tested Formula E machinery for China Racing at Donington Park. The following year, Buret joined Juncos Racing to compete in the Pro Mazda Championship. In his only season in the series, Buret won at Indianapolis and scored seven more podiums en route to a fifth-place points finish.

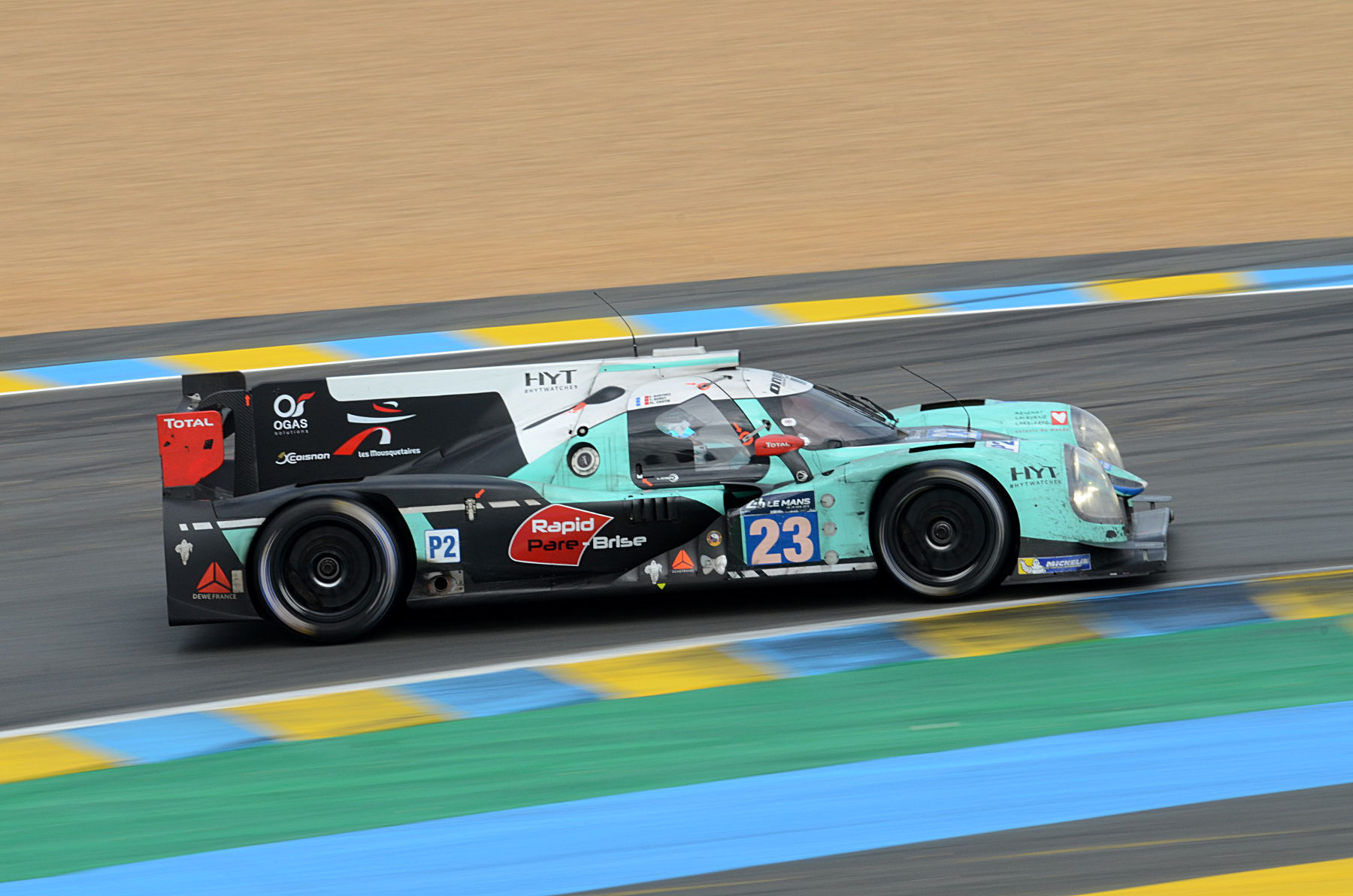
Buret on his 24 Hours of Le Mans debut for Panis Barthez Compétition in 2016.

At the start of 2016, Buret joined ETEC Motorsport to race in Toyota Racing Series, in which he scored a best result of sixth at Ruapuna to end the winter 15th in points. For the rest of 2016, Buret joined Panis Barthez Compétition to race in the LMP2 class of the European Le Mans Series. In his rookie year in the series, Buret scored a best result of seventh four times as he rounded out the year 12th in points. During 2016, Buret also competed in the 24 Hours of Spa for Classic & Modern Racing. Buret remained with Panis Barthez Compétition for 2017, as he returned to the LMP2 class of the European Le Mans Series. In his sophomore year, Buret scored a best result of fourth at Le Castellet to end the year tenth in points.

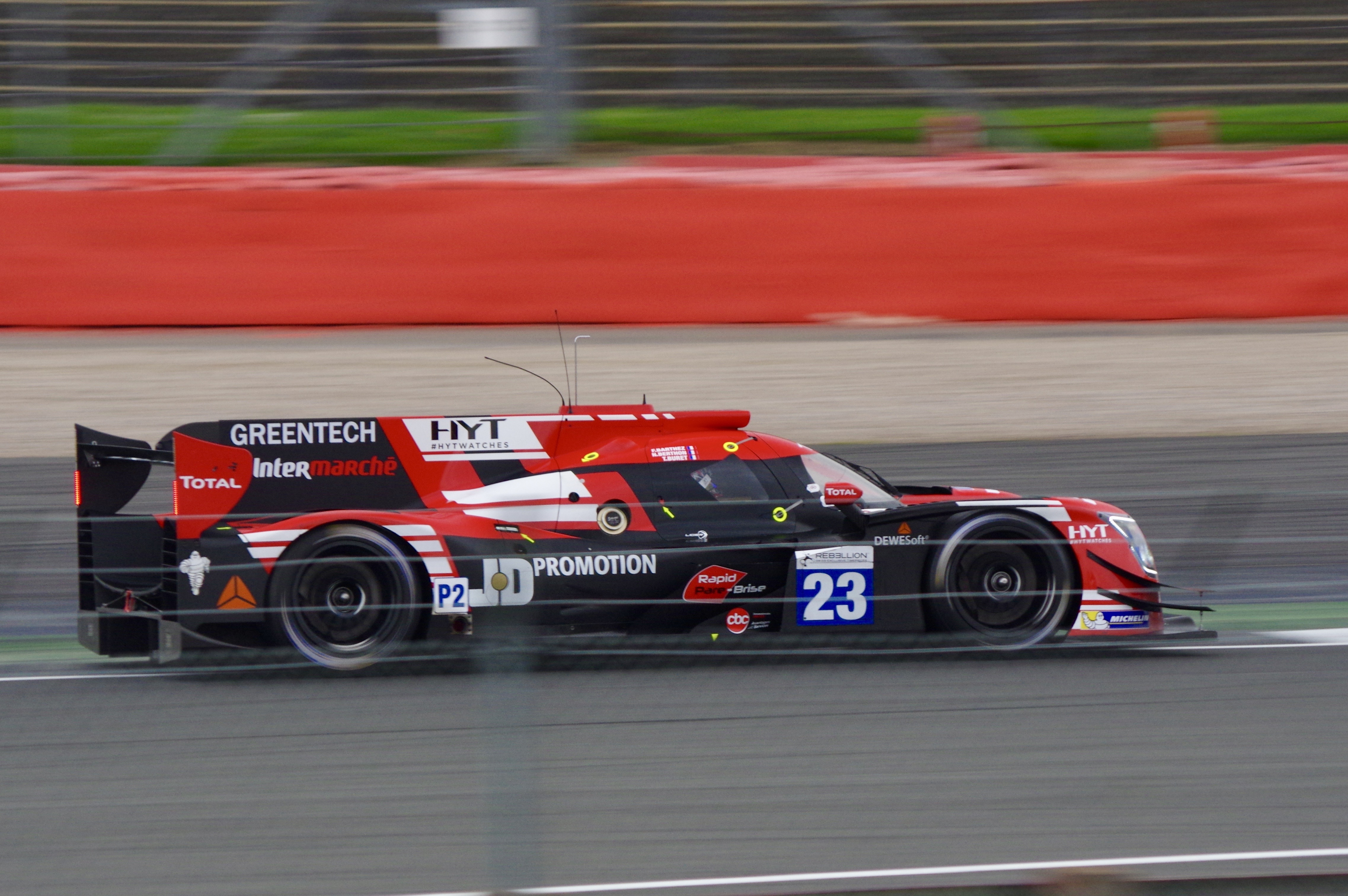
Buret's Panis Barthez Compétition Ligier JS P217 at Silverstone in 2017.

The following year, Buret returned to Panis Barthez Compétition for his third season in the LMP2 class of the European Le Mans Series. In the six-race season, Buret finished third at Spa and second at Algarve to end the year ninth in points. Remaining with Panis Barthez Compétition for 2019, scoring a best result of fifth at Silverstone to end the year 17th in the LMP2 standings. During 2019, Buret also raced in the 24 Hours of Spa for Tech 1 Racing.

In 2020, Buret remained with Tech 1 Racing for a full season in GT World Challenge Europe Endurance Cup, along with a campaign in the GT4 European Series with CMR. In the former, Buret scored a lone Silver Cup podium at Le Castellet to take eighth in the class standings, whereas in the latter, Buret scored two podiums to end the year seventh in the Silver Cup points. During 2020, Buret also made a one-off appearance in the European Le Mans Series and the 24 Hours of Le Mans in the LMP2 class for DragonSpeed.

The following year, Buret joined AKKA ASP Team to race in both the GT4 European Series and the French GT4 Cup. In the former, Buret won at Nogaro and Albi and scored five more podiums to secure third in the Silver standings. In the latter, Buret scored a lone Silver Cup win at Zandvoort and ended the year tenth in points. During 2021, Buret also competed in the first two rounds of the IMSA SportsCar Championship in the LMP2 class with Tower Motorsport By Starworks. In 2022, Buret only raced in the French GT4 Cup with K-Worx in the Pro-Am class, scoring class wins at Spa, Val de Vienne and Le Castellet to end the year sixth in points.

The following year, Buret raced in the first three rounds of the GT4 European Series with AGS Events, before making one-off appearances in the French GT4 Cup and the European Endurance Prototype Challenge. After not racing in 2024, Buret raced for Switch Racing in the first two rounds of the 2025 European Endurance Prototype Cup, before leaving the team and series ahead of the round in Algarve.

== Racing record ==
=== Racing career summary ===
Season	Series	Team	Races	Wins	Poles	F/Laps	Podiums	Points	Position
2013	V de V Challenge Endurance Proto - Scratch	Equipe Palmyr	7	0	0	0	0	35.5	28th
2013	V de V Challenge Monoplace	Equipe Palmyr	16	0	0	1	1	415	6th
2013	V de V Michelin Endurance Series - GT	Equipe Palmyr	1	0	0	0	0	0	NC
2014	V de V Challenge Endurance Proto - Scratch	Equipe Palmyr	7	0	0	0	5	144.5	**2nd**
2014	V de V Challenge Monoplace	Equipe Palmyr	18	3	1	3	5	546	5th
2015	Pro Mazda Winterfest	Juncos Racing	5	0	0	0	0	77	9th
2015	Pro Mazda Championship	Juncos Racing	16	1	1	2	8	281	5th
2015	Walter Hayes Trophy		1	0	0	0	0	—N/a	11th
2016	Toyota Racing Series	ETEC Motorsport	15	0	0	0	0	349	15th
2016	European Le Mans Series – LMP2	Panis Barthez Compétition	6	0	1	0	0	27.5	12th
2016	24 Hours of Le Mans – LMP2	Panis Barthez Compétition	1	0	0	0	0	—N/a	8th
2016	Blancpain GT Series Endurance Cup	Classic & Modern Racing	1	0	0	0	0	0	NC
2016	Blancpain GT Series Endurance Cup – Am	Classic & Modern Racing	1	0	0	0	0	9	31st
2016	Intercontinental GT Challenge	Classic & Modern Racing	1	0	0	0	0	0	NC
2017	European Le Mans Series – LMP2	Panis Barthez Compétition	6	0	1	0	0	41	10th
2017	24 Hours of Le Mans – LMP2	Panis Barthez Compétition	1	0	0	0	0	—N/a	DNF
2017–18	Andros Trophy – Électrique		26	0	0	1	0	235	7th
2018	European Le Mans Series – LMP2	Panis Barthez Compétition	6	0	1	0	2	45.5	9th
2018	24 Hours of Le Mans – LMP2	Panis Barthez Compétition	1	0	0	0	0	—N/a	9th
2019	European Le Mans Series – LMP2	Panis Barthez Compétition	6	0	0	0	0	20	17th
2019	Ultimate Cup Series - CN	Palmyr	1	0	0	0	1	0	NC
2019	Blancpain GT Series Endurance Cup	Tech 1 Racing	1	0	0	0	0	0	NC
2019	Blancpain GT Series Endurance Cup – Am	Tech 1 Racing	1	0	0	0	0	14	24th
2020	GT World Challenge Europe Endurance Cup	Tech 1 Racing	4	0	0	0	0	0	NC
2020	GT World Challenge Europe Endurance Cup – Silver	Tech 1 Racing	4	0	1	0	1	44	8th
2020	GT4 European Series – Silver	CMR	9	0	0	1	2	76	7th
2020	European Le Mans Series – LMP2	DragonSpeed USA	1	0	0	0	0	1	27th
2020	24 Hours of Le Mans – LMP2	DragonSpeed USA	1	0	0	0	0	—N/a	DNF
2021	IMSA SportsCar Championship – LMP2	Tower Motorsport by Starworks	2	0	0	0	2	326	10th
2021	GT4 European Series – Silver	AKKA ASP Team	12	1	0	0	2	67	10th
2021	French GT4 Cup – Silver	AKKA ASP Team	12	2	0	0	7	169	**3rd**
2022	French GT4 Cup – Pro-Am	K-Worx	12	3	0	0	3	95	6th
2023	GT4 European Series – Silver	AGS Events	6	0	0	0	0	0	NC
2023	French GT4 Cup – Silver	CMR	2	0	0	0	0	4	17th
2023	Endurance Prototype Challenge – CN	Wolf Racing France	2	0	0	0	1	0	NC
2025	European Endurance Prototype Cup	Switch Racing	2	0	0	0	0	1	60th

=== American open–wheel racing ===
(key) (Races in bold indicate pole position; races in italics indicate fastest lap)

==== Pro Mazda Championship ====
Year	Team	1	2	3	4	5	6	7	8	9	10	11	12	13	14	15	16	17	Rank	Points
2015	Juncos Racing	STP; 1; 17	STP; 2; 13	LOU; 1; 3	LOU; 2 C	BAR; 1; 2	BAR; 2; 8	IMS; 1; 2	**IMS**; **2**; 1*	IMS; 3; 3	LOR; 12	TOR; 1; 3	TOR; 2; 7	IOW; 9	MOH; 1; 3	MOH; 2; 2	LAG; 1; 11	LAG; 2; 7	5th	281

=== Complete Toyota Racing Series results ===
(key) (Races in bold indicate pole position) (Races in italics indicate fastest lap)

Year	Team	1	2	3	4	5	6	7	8	9	10	11	12	13	14	15	DC	Points
2016	ETEC Motorsport	RUA; 1; 10	RUA; 2; 6	RUA; 3; 15	TER; 1; 14	TER; 2; 11	TER; 3 Ret	HMP; 1; 13	HMP; 2; 15	HMP; 3; 13	TAU; 1; 16	TAU; 2 Ret	TAU; 3; 13	MAU; 1; 10	MAU; 2; 13	MAU; 3; 18	15th	349

=== Complete European Le Mans Series results ===
(key) (Races in bold indicate pole position; results in italics indicate fastest lap)

Year	Entrant	Class	Chassis	Engine	1	2	3	4	5	6	Rank	Points
2016	Panis Barthez Compétition	LMP2	Ligier JS P2	Nissan VK45DE 4.5 L V8	SIL; 9	IMO; 7	**RBR**; 7	LEC; 10	SPA; 7	EST; 7	12th	27.5
2017	Panis Barthez Compétition	LMP2	Ligier JS P217	Gibson GK428 4.2 L V8	SIL; 9	MNZ; 7	RBR; 5	LEC; 4	SPA; 9	**ALG**; 6	10th	41
2018	Panis Barthez Compétition	LMP2	Ligier JS P217	Gibson GK428 4.2 L V8	LEC; 8	MNZ; 7	RBR; 10	**SIL**; 6	SPA; 3‡	ALG; 2	9th	45.5
2019	Panis Barthez Compétition	LMP2	Ligier JS P217	Gibson GK428 4.2 L V8	LEC; Ret	MNZ; 7	CAT; Ret	SIL; 5	SPA; Ret	ALG; 8	17th	20
2020	DragonSpeed USA	LMP2	Oreca 07	Gibson GK428 4.2 L V8	LEC	SPA	LEC; 10	MNZ	ALG		27th	1

=== 24 Hours of Le Mans results ===
Year	Team	Co-Drivers	Car	Class	Laps	Pos.	Class Pos.
2016	(France) Panis Barthez Compétition	(France) Fabien Barthez (France) Paul-Loup Chatin	Ligier JS P2-Nissan	LMP2	347	12th	8th
2017	(France) Panis Barthez Compétition	(France) Fabien Barthez (France) Nathanaël Berthon	Ligier JS P217-Gibson	LMP2	296	DNF	DNF
2018	(France) Panis Barthez Compétition	(France) Julien Canal (United Kingdom) Will Stevens	Ligier JS P217-Gibson	LMP2	352	13th	9th
2020	(United States) DragonSpeed USA	(Colombia) Juan Pablo Montoya (Mexico) Memo Rojas	Oreca 07-Gibson	LMP2	192	DNF	DNF

=== Complete GT World Challenge Europe results ===
==== GT World Challenge Europe Endurance Cup ====
(Races in bold indicate pole position) (Races in italics indicate fastest lap)

Year	Team	Car	Class	1	2	3	4	5	6	7	Pos.	Points
2016	Classic & Modern Racing	Ferrari 458 Italia GT3	Am	MNZ	SIL	LEC	SPA; 6H; 51	SPA; 12H; 50	SPA; 24H; Ret	NÜR	31st	9
2019	Tech 1 Racing	Lexus RC F GT3	Am	MON	SIL	LEC	SPA; 6H; 51	SPA; 12H; 47	SPA; 24H; 44	CAT	24th	14
2020	Tech 1 Racing	Lexus RC F GT3	Silver	**IMO**; 19	NÜR; 39	SPA; 6H; 28	SPA; 12H; 43	SPA; 24H; Ret	LEC; 16		8th	44

=== Complete GT4 European Series results ===
(key) (Races in bold indicate pole position) (Races in italics indicate fastest lap)

Year	Team	Car	Class	1	2	3	4	5	6	7	8	9	10	11	12	Pos	Points
2020	CMR	Toyota GR Supra GT4	Silver	IMO; 1; 9	IMO; 2 DNS	MIS; 1 Ret	MIS; 2; 6	NÜR; 1; 9	NÜR; 2; 11	ZAN; 1; 8	ZAN; 2; 9	SPA; 1	SPA; 2	LEC; 1; 3	LEC; 2; 3	7th	76
2021	AKKA ASP	Mercedes-AMG GT4	Silver	MNZ; 1; 32	MNZ; 2; 37	LEC; 1; 7	LEC; 2; 9	ZAN; 1; 32	ZAN; 2; 3	SPA; 1; 2	SPA; 2; 18	NÜR; 1; 11	NÜR; 2; 13	CAT; 1; 17	CAT; 2; 14	10th	67
2023	AGS Events	Aston Martin Vantage AMR GT4	Silver	MNZ; 1; 30	MNZ; 2 Ret	LEC; 1; 32	LEC; 2; 20	SPA; 1; 26	SPA; 2; 23	MIS; 1	MIS; 2	HOC; 1	HOC; 2	CAT; 1	CAT; 2	NC	0

=== Complete IMSA SportsCar Championship results ===
(key) (Races in bold indicate pole position; races in italics indicate fastest lap)

Year	Entrant	Class	Make	Engine	1	2	3	4	5	6	7	Rank	Points
2021	Tower Motorsport by Starworks	LMP2	Oreca 07	Gibson GK428 4.2 L V8	DAY; 2†	SEB; 3	WGL	WGL	ELK	LGA	PET	10th	326

^{†} Points only counted towards the Michelin Endurance Cup, and not the overall LMP2 Championship.
