= 2020 GT4 European Series =

The 2020 GT4 European Series was the thirteenth season of the GT4 European Series, a sports car championship organised by Stéphane Ratel Organisation (SRO). The season began at Imola on 25 July and ended at the Circuit Paul Ricard on 15 November.

== Calendar ==
A 2020 calendar was announced on 29 July 2019 at SRO's annual press conference at the 2019 24 Hours of Spa. However, as a result of the coronavirus crisis SRO had to revise its schedule and an updated calendar was released on 15 May 2020.

Round	Circuit	Date	Supporting
1	Autodromo Enzo e Dino Ferrari, Imola, Italy	25–26 July	GT World Challenge Europe Endurance Cup
2	Misano World Circuit Marco Simoncelli, Misano Adriatico, Italy	8–9 August	GT World Challenge Europe Sprint Cup
3	Nürburgring, Nürburg, Germany	5–6 September	GT World Challenge Europe Endurance Cup
4	Circuit Zandvoort, Zandvoort, Netherlands	26–27 September	GT World Challenge Europe Sprint Cup
5	Circuit de Spa-Francorchamps, Stavelot, Belgium	24–25 October	GT World Challenge Europe Endurance Cup
6	Circuit Paul Ricard, Le Castellet, France	14–15 November	GT World Challenge Europe Endurance Cup
Cancelled due to the COVID-19 pandemic
Circuit			Original Date
(United Kingdom) Silverstone Circuit, Silverstone, Great Britain			9–10 May
Hungaroring, Mogyoród, Hungary			26–27 September

== Entry list ==
Team	Car	No.	Drivers	Class	Rounds
(France) CMR	Toyota GR Supra GT4	8	(Belgium) Stéphane Lémeret	S	All
(France) CMR	Toyota GR Supra GT4	8	(France) Gael Castelli	S	All
(France) CMR	Toyota GR Supra GT4	66	(France) Timothé Buret	S	1–4, 6
(France) CMR	Toyota GR Supra GT4	66	(Belgium) Antoine Potty	S	1–4, 6
(France) CMR	Toyota GR Supra GT4	66	(Belgium) Antoine Potty	PA	5
(France) CMR	Toyota GR Supra GT4	66	(France) Wilfried Cazalbon	PA	5
(Turkey) Borusan Otomotiv Motorsport	BMW M4 GT4	12	(Turkey) Yağız Gedik	PA	All
(Turkey) Borusan Otomotiv Motorsport	BMW M4 GT4	12	(Turkey) Cem Bölükbaşı	PA	All
(Turkey) Borusan Otomotiv Motorsport	BMW M4 GT4	13	(Turkey) Ibrahim Okyay	Am	All
(Turkey) Borusan Otomotiv Motorsport	BMW M4 GT4	13	(Turkey) Hasan Tansu	Am	3
(Turkey) Borusan Otomotiv Motorsport	BMW M4 GT4	13	(Turkey) Fatih Ayhan	Am	5–6
(Spain) NM Racing Team	Mercedes-AMG GT4	15	(Spain) Xavier Lloveras	S	All
(Spain) NM Racing Team	Mercedes-AMG GT4	15	(Spain) Lluc Ibáñez	S	1–4, 6
(Spain) NM Racing Team	Mercedes-AMG GT4	15	(Spain) Rafael Villanueva	S	5
(Netherlands) V8 Racing	Chevrolet Camaro GT4.R	17	(Netherlands) Thijmen Nabuurs	S	All
(Netherlands) V8 Racing	Chevrolet Camaro GT4.R	17	(Netherlands) Jop Rappange	S	All
(Netherlands) V8 Racing	Chevrolet Camaro GT4.R	99	(Spain) Jorge Cabezas Catalan	S	3–5
(Netherlands) V8 Racing	Chevrolet Camaro GT4.R	99	(Netherlands) Duncan Huisman	S	3–5
(Switzerland) R-Motorsport	Aston Martin Vantage AMR GT4	18	(Germany) Markus Lungstrass	Am	6
(Switzerland) R-Motorsport	Aston Martin Vantage AMR GT4	18	(Denmark) Henrik Lyngbye Pedersen	Am	6
(Switzerland) R-Motorsport	Aston Martin Vantage AMR GT4	762	(United Kingdom) George Gamble	S	6
(Switzerland) R-Motorsport	Aston Martin Vantage AMR GT4	762	(United Kingdom) Seb Perez	S	6
(Germany) Allied-Racing	Porsche 718 Cayman GT4 Clubsport	21	(Denmark) Nicolaj Møller Madsen	PA	All
(Germany) Allied-Racing	Porsche 718 Cayman GT4 Clubsport	21	(Germany) Jörg Viebahn	PA	All
(Germany) Allied-Racing	Porsche 718 Cayman GT4 Clubsport	22	(Denmark) Bastian Buus	PA	All
(Germany) Allied-Racing	Porsche 718 Cayman GT4 Clubsport	22	(Germany) Jan Kasperlik	PA	All
(France) AGS Events	Aston Martin Vantage AMR GT4	27	(France) Valentin Hasse-Clot	S	All
(France) AGS Events	Aston Martin Vantage AMR GT4	27	(France) Théo Nouet	S	All
(France) AGS Events	Aston Martin Vantage AMR GT4	39	(France) Fabien Baule	Am	6
(France) AGS Events	Aston Martin Vantage AMR GT4	39	(France) Jonathan Mareschal	Am	6
(France) AGS Events	Aston Martin Vantage AMR GT4	89	(France) Nicolas Gomar	Am	All
(France) AGS Events	Aston Martin Vantage AMR GT4	89	(France) Gilles Vannelet	Am	All
(Belgium) Selleslagh Racing Team	Mercedes-AMG GT4	30	(Belgium) Wim Spinoy	PA	1–3
(Belgium) Selleslagh Racing Team	Mercedes-AMG GT4	30	(Netherlands) Kay van Berlo	PA	1–2
(Belgium) Selleslagh Racing Team	Mercedes-AMG GT4	30	(Germany) Kenneth Heyer	PA	3
(Belgium) Selleslagh Racing Team	Mercedes-AMG GT4	30	(Austria) Martin Konrad	PA	3
(Belgium) Selleslagh Racing Team	Mercedes-AMG GT4	30	(Netherlands) Willem Meijer	S	4–5
(Belgium) Selleslagh Racing Team	Mercedes-AMG GT4	30	(Netherlands) Paul Sieljes	S	4
(Belgium) Selleslagh Racing Team	Mercedes-AMG GT4	30	(Belgium) Esteban Muth	S	5
(Belgium) Selleslagh Racing Team	Mercedes-AMG GT4	30	(Netherlands) Max Koebolt	S	6
(Belgium) Selleslagh Racing Team	Mercedes-AMG GT4	30	(Netherlands) Thierry Vermeulen	S	6
(Belgium) Selleslagh Racing Team	Mercedes-AMG GT4	31	(Netherlands) Bob Herber	Am	2–5
(Belgium) Selleslagh Racing Team	Mercedes-AMG GT4	31	(Germany) Kenneth Heyer	S	6
(Belgium) Selleslagh Racing Team	Mercedes-AMG GT4	31	(Belgium) Esteban Muth	S	6
(Belgium) Selleslagh Racing Team	Mercedes-AMG GT4	32	(Belgium) Johan Vannerum	Am	2–3
(Belgium) Selleslagh Racing Team	Mercedes-AMG GT4	32	(Belgium) Jean-Luc Behets	Am	2–3
(France) Team Jouffruit by Vic'Team	Mercedes-AMG GT4	64	(France) Olivier Jouffret	PA	6
(France) Team Jouffruit by Vic'Team	Mercedes-AMG GT4	64	(France) Eric Tremoulet	PA	6
(Germany) Dörr Motorsport	McLaren 570S GT4	69	(Germany) Phil Dörr	S	3
(Germany) Dörr Motorsport	McLaren 570S GT4	69	(Russia) Aleksey Sizov	S	3
(San Marino) W&D Racing Team	BMW M4 GT4	71	(San Marino) Paolo Meloni	Am	1–2
(San Marino) W&D Racing Team	BMW M4 GT4	71	(San Marino) Stefano Valli	Am	1–2
(Italy) Autorlando Sport	Porsche 718 Cayman GT4 Clubsport	75	(Italy) Dario Cerati	Am	All
(Italy) Autorlando Sport	Porsche 718 Cayman GT4 Clubsport	75	(Italy) Maurizio Fratti	Am	1–2
(Italy) Autorlando Sport	Porsche 718 Cayman GT4 Clubsport	75	(Italy) Dario Baruchelli	Am	3
(Italy) Autorlando Sport	Porsche 718 Cayman GT4 Clubsport	75	(United Kingdom) JM Littman	Am	4
(Italy) Autorlando Sport	Porsche 718 Cayman GT4 Clubsport	75	(Italy) Maurizio Fondi	Am	5–6
(Italy) Autorlando Sport	Porsche 718 Cayman GT4 Clubsport	76	(Italy) Giuseppe Ghezzi	Am	All
(Italy) Autorlando Sport	Porsche 718 Cayman GT4 Clubsport	76	(Italy) Salvatore Riolo	Am	1–2
(Italy) Autorlando Sport	Porsche 718 Cayman GT4 Clubsport	76	(Netherlands) Christian de Kent	Am	3
(Italy) Autorlando Sport	Porsche 718 Cayman GT4 Clubsport	76	(Italy) Jacopo Baratto	Am	4
(Italy) Autorlando Sport	Porsche 718 Cayman GT4 Clubsport	76	(Italy) Andreas Mayrl	Am	5–6
(France) AKKA ASP	Mercedes-AMG GT4	87	(France) Jean-Luc Beaubelique	PA	6
(France) AKKA ASP	Mercedes-AMG GT4	87	(France) Jim Pla	PA	6
(Sweden) Lestrup Racing Team	BMW M4 GT4	98	(Sweden) Alfred Nilsson	PA	5
(Sweden) Lestrup Racing Team	BMW M4 GT4	98	(Sweden) Joakim Walde	PA	5
(Germany) RN Vision STS Racing Team	BMW M4 GT4	110	(Netherlands) Mark van der Aa	S	1–4
(Germany) RN Vision STS Racing Team	BMW M4 GT4	110	(Netherlands) Koen Bogaerts	S	1–4
(Germany) RN Vision STS Racing Team	BMW M4 GT4	111	(Italy) Gabriele Piana	S	1–4
(Germany) RN Vision STS Racing Team	BMW M4 GT4	111	(Netherlands) Bas Schouten	S	1–4
(Switzerland) Centri Porsche Ticino	Porsche 718 Cayman GT4 Clubsport	718	(Switzerland) Ivan Jacoma	PA	1–4
(Switzerland) Centri Porsche Ticino	Porsche 718 Cayman GT4 Clubsport	718	(Switzerland) Joël Camathias	PA	1–4

Icon	Class
S	Silver Cup
PA	Pro-Am Cup
Am	Am Cup

== Race calendar and results ==
Bold indicates the overall winner.

Round		Circuit	Date	Pole position	Silver Winners	Pro-Am Winners	Am Winners
1	R1	(Italy) Imola	25 July	(Turkey) No.12 Borusan Otomotiv Motorsport	**(Germany) No. 111 RN Vision STS Racing Team**	(Turkey) No.12 Borusan Otomotiv Motorsport	(San Marino) No. 71 W&D Racing Team
1	R1	(Italy) Imola	25 July	(Turkey) Cem Bölükbaşi (Turkey) Yağız Gedik	**(Italy) Gabriele Piana** **(Netherlands) Bas Schouten**	(Turkey) Cem Bölükbaşi (Turkey) Yağız Gedik	(San Marino) Paolo Meloni (San Marino) Stefano Valli
1	R2	(Italy) Imola	26 July	(Germany) No. 111 RN Vision STS Racing Team	**(Germany) No. 111 RN Vision STS Racing Team**	(Germany) No. 22 Allied-Racing	(France) No. 89 AGS Events
1	R2	(Italy) Imola	26 July	(Italy) Gabriele Piana (Netherlands) Bas Schouten	**(Italy) Gabriele Piana** **(Netherlands) Bas Schouten**	(Denmark) Bastian Buus (Germany) Jan Kasperlik	(France) Nicolas Gomar (France) Gilles Vannelet
2	R1	(Italy) Misano	8 August	(France) No. 27 AGS Events	**(Spain) No. 15 NM Racing Team**	(Germany) No. 21 Allied-Racing	(Belgium) No. 31 Selleslagh Racing Team
2	R1	(Italy) Misano	8 August	(France) Valentin Hasse-Clot (France) Théo Nouet	**(Spain) Lluc Ibáñez** **(Spain) Xavier Lloveras**	(Denmark) Nicolaj Møller Madsen (Germany) Jörg Viebahn	(Netherlands) Bob Herber
2	R2	(Italy) Misano	9 August	(Spain) No. 15 NM Racing Team	**(France) No. 27 AGS Events**	(Germany) No. 22 Allied-Racing	(Belgium) No. 31 Selleslagh Racing Team
2	R2	(Italy) Misano	9 August	(Spain) Lluc Ibáñez (Spain) Xavier Lloveras	**(France) Valentin Hasse-Clot** **(France) Théo Nouet**	(Denmark) Bastian Buus (Germany) Jan Kasperlik	(Netherlands) Bob Herber
3	R1	(Germany) Nürburgring	5 September	(Switzerland) No. 718 Centri Porsche Ticino	**(Spain) No. 15 NM Racing Team**	(Germany) No. 22 Allied-Racing	(France) No. 89 AGS Events
3	R1	(Germany) Nürburgring	5 September	(Switzerland) Joël Camathias (Switzerland) Ivan Jacoma	**(Spain) Lluc Ibáñez** **(Spain) Xavier Lloveras**	(Denmark) Bastian Buus (Germany) Jan Kasperlik	(France) Nicolas Gomar (France) Gilles Vannelet
3	R2	(Germany) Nürburgring	6 September	(Germany) No. 22 Allied-Racing	(France) No. 27 AGS Events	**(Germany) No. 22 Allied-Racing**	(Belgium) No. 31 Selleslagh Racing Team
3	R2	(Germany) Nürburgring	6 September	(Denmark) Bastian Buus (Germany) Jan Kasperlik	(France) Valentin Hasse-Clot (France) Théo Nouet	**(Denmark) Bastian Buus** **(Germany) Jan Kasperlik**	(Netherlands) Bob Herber
4	R1	(Netherlands) Zandvoort	26 September	(Netherlands) No. 99 V8 Racing	(France) No. 27 AGS Events	**(Germany) No. 22 Allied-Racing**	(France) No. 89 AGS Events
4	R1	(Netherlands) Zandvoort	26 September	(Spain) Jorge Cabezas (Netherlands) Duncan Huisman	(France) Théo Nouet (France) Valentin Hasse-Clot	**(Denmark) Bastian Buus** **(Germany) Jan Kasperlik**	(France) Nicolas Gomar (France) Gilles Vannelet
4	R2	(Netherlands) Zandvoort	27 September	(Germany) No. 22 Allied-Racing	(France) No. 8 CMR	**(Germany) No. 22 Allied-Racing**	(Belgium) No. 31 Selleslagh Racing Team
4	R2	(Netherlands) Zandvoort	27 September	(Denmark) Bastian Buus (Germany) Jan Kasperlik	(Belgium) Stéphane Lémeret (France) Gael Castelli	**(Denmark) Bastian Buus** **(Germany) Jan Kasperlik**	(Netherlands) Bob Herber
5	R1	(Belgium) Spa-Francorchamps	23 October	(France) No. 27 AGS Events	**(France) No. 27 AGS Events**	(Germany) No. 22 Allied-Racing	(France) No. 89 AGS Events
5	R1	(Belgium) Spa-Francorchamps	23 October	(France) Valentin Hasse-Clot (France) Théo Nouet	**(France) Valentin Hasse-Clot** **(France) Théo Nouet**	(Denmark) Bastian Buus (Germany) Jan Kasperlik	(France) Nicolas Gomar (France) Gilles Vannelet
5	R2	(Belgium) Spa-Francorchamps	24 October	(France) No. 8 CMR	**(France) No. 8 CMR**	(Turkey) No. 12 Borusan Otomotiv Motorsport	(France) No. 89 AGS Events
5	R2	(Belgium) Spa-Francorchamps	24 October	(Belgium) Stéphane Lémeret (France) Gael Castelli	**(Belgium) Stéphane Lémeret** **(France) Gael Castelli**	(Turkey) Cem Bölükbaşi (Turkey) Yağız Gedik	(France) Nicolas Gomar (France) Gilles Vannelet
6	R1	(France) Paul Ricard	14 November	(France) No. 66 CMR	**(Spain) No. 15 NM Racing Team**	(France) No. 87 AKKA ASP	(France) No. 89 AGS Events
6	R1	(France) Paul Ricard	14 November	(France) Timothé Buret (Belgium) Antoine Potty	**(Spain) Lluc Ibáñez** **(Spain) Xavier Lloveras**	(France) Jean-Luc Beaubelique (France) Jim Pla	(France) Nicolas Gomar (France) Gilles Vannelet
6	R2	(France) Paul Ricard	14 November	(France) No. 87 AKKA ASP	**(Spain) No. 15 NM Racing Team**	(France) No. 87 AKKA ASP	(France) No. 89 AGS Events
6	R2	(France) Paul Ricard	14 November	(France) Jean-Luc Beaubelique (France) Jim Pla	**(Spain) Lluc Ibáñez** **(Spain) Xavier Lloveras**	(France) Jean-Luc Beaubelique (France) Jim Pla	(France) Nicolas Gomar (France) Gilles Vannelet

== Championship standings ==
Scoring system

Championship points were awarded for the first ten positions in each race. Entries were required to complete 75% of the winning car's race distance in order to be classified and earn points. Individual drivers were required to participate for a minimum of 25 minutes in order to earn championship points in any race.

Position	**1st**	**2nd**	**3rd**	**4th**	**5th**	**6th**	**7th**	**8th**	**9th**	**10th**
Points	25	18	15	12	10	8	6	4	2	1

=== Drivers' championship ===
Pos.	Driver	Team	IMO (Italy)		MIS (Italy)		NÜR (Germany)		ZAN (Netherlands)		SPA (Belgium)		LEC (France)		Points
Silver Cup
1	(France) Valentin Hasse-Clot (France) Théo Nouet	(France) AGS Events	2	6	**16**	1	17	**2**	2	4	**1**	4	5	Ret	184
2	(Spain) Xavier Lloveras	(Spain) NM Racing Team	Ret	5	1	**4**	**1**	17	9	10	11	6	**1**	1	163
3	(Belgium) Stéphane Lémeret (France) Gael Castelli	(France) CMR	14	2	14	13	2	3	6	**2**	15	**1**	6	Ret	158
4	(Netherlands) Thijmen Nabuurs (Netherlands) Jop Rappange	(Netherlands) V8 Racing	8	9	5	2	6	Ret	4	3	8	Ret	2	**2**	151
5	(Spain) Lluc Ibáñez	(Spain) NM Racing Team	Ret	5	1	**4**	**1**	17	9	10			**1**	1	141
6	(Italy) Gabriele Piana (Netherlands) Bas Schouten	(Germany) RN Vision STS Racing Team	**1**	**1**	2	3	8	7	7	7					123
7	(France) Timothé Buret (Belgium) Antoine Potty	(France) CMR	9	DNS	Ret	6	9	11	8	9			3	3	76
8	(Spain) Jorge Cabezas (Netherlands) Duncan Huisman	(Netherlands) V8 Racing					7	10	**5**	5	6	10			70
9	(Netherlands) Mark van der Aa (Netherlands) Koen Bogaerts	(Germany) RN Vision STS Racing Team	7	12	6	9	Ret	9	Ret	17					55
10	(Netherlands) Willem Meijer	(Belgium) Selleslagh Racing Team							17	8	3	2			12
11	(Germany) Phil Dörr (Russia) Aleksey Sizov	(Germany) Dörr Motorsport					3	6							30
12	(Germany) Kenneth Heyer	(Belgium) Selleslagh Racing Team											7	5	20
13	(Netherlands) Paul Sieljes	(Belgium) Selleslagh Racing Team							17	8					12
Drivers ineligible to score points
–	(Belgium) Esteban Muth	(Belgium) Selleslagh Racing Team									3	2	7	5	–
–	(Spain) Rafael Villanueva	(Spain) NM Racing Team									11	6			–
–	(Netherlands) Max Koebolt (Netherlands) Thierry Vermeulen	(Belgium) Selleslagh Racing Team											11	6	–
–	(United Kingdom) George Gamble (United Kingdom) Seb Perez	(Switzerland) R-Motorsport											12	Ret	–
Pro-Am Cup
1	(Denmark) Bastian Buus (Germany) Jan Kasperlik	(Germany) Allied-Racing	6	3	11	5	4	**1**	**1**	**1**	**2**	Ret	13	12	240
2	(Turkey) Cem Bölükbaşi (Turkey) Yağız Gedik	(Turkey) Borusan Otomotiv Motorsport	**3**	11	**4**	7	12	8	12	14	9	5	**8**	Ret	192
2	(Denmark) Nicolaj Møller Madsen (Germany) Jörg Viebahn	(Germany) Allied-Racing	5	4	3	**12**	18	5	3	6	4	7	WD	WD	170
4	(Switzerland) Ivan Jacoma (Switzerland) Joël Camathias	(Switzerland) Centri Porsche Ticino	4	**14**	8	Ret	**5**	4	13	18					103
5	(Belgium) Wim Spinoy	(Belgium) Selleslagh Racing Team	16	10	9	Ret	14	WD							49
6	(Netherlands) Kay van Berlo	(Belgium) Selleslagh Racing Team	16	10	9	Ret									37
7	(Germany) Kenneth Heyer	(Belgium) Selleslagh Racing Team					14	18							22
8	(Belgium) Antoine Potty	(France) CMR									5	Ret			15
9	(Austria) Martin Konrad	(Belgium) Selleslagh Racing Team						18							10
Drivers ineligible to score points
–	(France) Jean-Luc Beaubelique (France) Jim Pla	(France) AKKA ASP											4	**4**	–
–	(France) Wilfried Cazalbon	(France) CMR									5	**Ret**			–
–	(Sweden) Alfred Nilsson (Sweden) Joakim Walde	(Sweden) Lestrup Racing Team									14	8			–
–	(France) Olivier Jouffret (France) Eric Tremoulet	(France) Team Jouffruit by Vic'Team											9	Ret	–
Am Cup
1	(France) Nicolas Gomar (France) Gilles Vannelet	(France) AGS Events	11	**7**	**15**	10	**10**	**14**	10	12	**7**	**3**	10	**7**	254
2	(Netherlands) Bob Herber	(Belgium) Selleslagh Racing Team			7	8	11	12	**11**	**11**	10	11			169
3	(Italy) Giuseppe Ghezzi	(Italy) Autorlando Sport	15	13	10	14	16	16	15	16	13	9	14	8	163
4	(Turkey) Ibrahim Okyay	(Turkey) Borusan Otomotiv Motorsport	13	8	Ret	15	15	15	14	13	12	Ret	18	9	136
5	(Italy) Dario Cerati	(Italy) Autorlando Sport	12	Ret	13	17	19	Ret	16	15	16	12	17	13	112
6	(Belgium) Johan Vannerum (Belgium) Jean-Luc Behets	(Belgium) Selleslagh Racing Team			12	16	13	13							56
7	(Italy) Salvatore Riolo	(Italy) Autorlando Sport	15	13	10	14									55
8	(San Marino) Paolo Meloni (San Marino) Stefano Valli	(San Marino) W&D Racing Team	**10**	15	Ret	**11**									52
9	(Italy) Maurizio Fratti	(Italy) Autorlando Sport	12	Ret	13	17									33
10	(Turkey) Hasan Tansu	(Turkey) Borusan Otomotiv Motorsport					15	15							24
11	(United Kingdom) JM Littman	(Italy) Autorlando Sport							16	15					22
12	(Italy) Jacopo Baratto	(Italy) Autorlando Sport							15	16					22
13	(Netherlands) Christian de Kant	(Italy) Autorlando Sport					16	16							20
14	(Italy) Dario Baruchelli	(Italy) Autorlando Sport					19	Ret							8
Drivers ineligible to score points
–	(Italy) Andreas Mayrl	(Italy) Autorlando Sport									13	9	14	8	–
–	(Turkey) Fatih Ayhan	(Turkey) Borusan Otomotiv Motorsport									12	Ret	18	9	–
–	(France) Fabien Baule (France) Jonathan Mareschal	(France) AGS Events											15	10	–
–	(Germany) Markus Lungstrass (Denmark) Henrik Lyngbye Pedersen	(Switzerland) R-Motorsport											**16**	11	–
–	(Italy) Maurizio Fondi	(Italy) Autorlando Sport									16	12	17	13	–
Pos.	Driver	Team	IMO (Italy)		MIS (Italy)		NÜR (Germany)		ZAN (Netherlands)		SPA (Belgium)		LEC (France)		Points

Key
Colour	Result
Gold	Race winner
Silver	2nd place
Bronze	3rd place
Green	Points finish
Blue	Non-points finish
Blue	Non-classified finish (NC)
Purple	Did not finish (Ret)
Black	Disqualified (DSQ)
Black	Excluded (EX)
White	Did not start (DNS)
White	Race cancelled (C)
White	Withdrew (WD)
Blank	Did not participate

**Bold** – Pole
Italics – Fastest Lap

=== Teams' championship ===
The two highest-scoring cars per Team will score points. Any other cars entered by that team will not score points towards the team title. A car scores points depending on the category it is entered in (Silver, Pro-Am or Am). The number of points awarded in each category is dependent on the number of cars participating in that class.

Position	**1st**	**2nd**	**3rd**	**4th**	**5th**	**6th**	**7th**	**8th**	**9th**	**10th**
Points if >5 cars in class	25	18	15	12	10	8	6	4	2	1
Points if 5 cars in class	18	15	12	10	8					
Points if 4 cars in class	15	12	10	8						
Points if 3 cars in class	12	10	8							
Points if 2 cars in class	10	8								
Points if 1 car in class	8									

Pos.	Team	Manufacturer	IMO (Italy)		MIS (Italy)		NÜR (Germany)		ZAN (Netherlands)		SPA (Belgium)		LEC (France)		Points
1	(France) AGS Events	Aston Martin	2	7	15	1	10	2	2	12	1	3	10	7	416
1	(France) AGS Events	Aston Martin	11	6	16	10	17	14	10	4	7	4	5	10	416
2	(Belgium) Selleslagh Racing Team	Mercedes-AMG	16	10	7	8	11	12	11	11	3	2	7	5	313
2	(Belgium) Selleslagh Racing Team	Mercedes-AMG			12	16	13	13	17	8	10	11	11	6	313
3	(Germany) Allied-Racing	Porsche	5	3	3	5	4	1	1	1	2	7	13	12	306
3	(Germany) Allied-Racing	Porsche	6	4	11	12	18	5	3	6	4	Ret	WD	WD	306
4	(Turkey) Borusan Otomotiv Motorsport	BMW	3	8	4	7	12	8	12	13	12	5	8	9	268
4	(Turkey) Borusan Otomotiv Motorsport	BMW	13	11	Ret	15	15	15	14	14	9	Ret	18	Ret	268
5	(Italy) Autorlando Sport	Porsche	12	13	10	14	16	16	15	15	13	9	14	8	248
5	(Italy) Autorlando Sport	Porsche	15	Ret	13	17	19	Ret	16	16	16	12	17	13	248
6	(France) CMR	Toyota	9	2	14	6	2	3	6	2	5	1	3	3	246
6	(France) CMR	Toyota	14	DNS	Ret	13	9	11	8	9	15	Ret	6	Ret	246
7	(Netherlands) V8 Racing	Chevrolet	8	9	5	2	6	10	4	3	6	10	2	2	221
7	(Netherlands) V8 Racing	Chevrolet					7	Ret	5	5	8	Ret			221
8	(Germany) RN Vision STS Racing Team	BMW	1	1	2	3	8	7	7	7					178
8	(Germany) RN Vision STS Racing Team	BMW	7	12	6	9	Ret	9	Ret	17					178
9	(Spain) NM Racing Team	Mercedes-AMG	Ret	5	1	4	1	17	9	10	11	6	1	1	163
10	(Switzerland) Centri Porsche Ticino	Porsche	4	14	8	Ret	5	4	13	18					81
11	(San Marino) W&D Racing Team	BMW	10	15	Ret	11									43
12	(Germany) Dörr Motorsport	McLaren					3	6							30
Teams ineligible to score points
–	(France) AKKA ASP	Mercedes-AMG											4	4	–
–	(Sweden) Lestrup Racing Team	BMW									14	8			–
–	(France) Team Jouffruit by Vic'Team	Mercedes-AMG											9	Ret	–
–	(Switzerland) R-Motorsport	Aston Martin											12	11	–
–	(Switzerland) R-Motorsport	Aston Martin											16	Ret	–
Pos.	Team	Manufacturer	IMO (Italy)		MIS (Italy)		NÜR (Germany)		ZAN (Netherlands)		SPA (Belgium)		LEC (France)		Points

== See also ==
- 2020 French GT4 Cup
- 2020 ADAC GT4 Germany
