= 2022 24 Hours of Spa =

75th 24 Hours of Spa endurance race

(Belgium) 2022 24 Hours of Spa
Event Information
- Round 3 of 5 in the 2022 GT World Challenge Europe Endurance Cup
- Date: 28 July–31 July 2022 GT World Challenge Europe Endurance Cup
- Location: Spa-Francorchamps, Wallonia, Belgium
- Venue: Circuit de Spa-Francorchamps

Results
Race 1
Distance	536 laps	km
Pole position	(Switzerland) Raffaele Marciello (Spain) Daniel Juncadella (Andorra) Jules Gounon (France) AKKodis ASP Team	02:16.375
Winner	(Switzerland) Raffaele Marciello (Spain) Daniel Juncadella (Andorra) Jules Gounon (France) AKKodis ASP Team	

The 2022 24 Hours of Spa (also known as the TotalEnergies 24 Hours of Spa for sponsorship reasons) was the 75th running of the 24 Hours of Spa. It took place from 28 July–31 July 2022. The race was a part of both the 2022 GT World Challenge Europe Endurance Cup and the 2022 Intercontinental GT Challenge.

== Background ==
Supporting the race weekend were the GT4 European Series, Lamborghini Super Trofeo Europe, French F4 Championship, Formula Regional European Championship and GT Anniversary by Peter Auto.

== Entry list ==
A 66-car field gathered to contest the race - 23 in Pro class, 19 in Silver Cup, 15 in Gold Cup, 7 in Pro-Am Cup and 2 in Bronze Cup. 9 manufacturers were represented, with 14 Mercedes cars, 13 Porsche cars, 11 Audi cars, 10 Lamborghini cars, 5 BMW cars, 5 Ferrari cars, 4 Aston Martin cars, 3 McLaren cars and 1 Bentley car.

No.	Entrant	Car	Driver 1	Driver 2	Driver 3	Driver 4
Pro (23 entries)
2	(Germany) BWT AMG - Team GetSpeed	Mercedes-AMG GT3 Evo	(Germany) Maximilian Götz	(Netherlands) Steijn Schothorst	(Germany) Luca Stolz	
6	(United States) Orange 1 K-PAX Racing	Lamborghini Huracán GT3 Evo	(Italy) Andrea Caldarelli	(Switzerland) Marco Mapelli	(South Africa) Jordan Pepper	
12	(Italy) Audi Sport Team Tresor	Audi R8 LMS Evo II	(Italy) Mattia Drudi	(Italy) Luca Ghiotto	(Germany) Christopher Haase	
19	(Switzerland) Emil Frey Racing	Lamborghini Huracán GT3 Evo	(Italy) Giacomo Altoè	(France) Arthur Rougier	(France) Léo Roussel	
23	(United States) Heart of Racing with TF Sport	Aston Martin Vantage AMR GT3	(Republic of Ireland) Charlie Eastwood	(United Kingdom) Ross Gunn	(Spain) Alex Riberas	
25	(France) Audi Sport Team Saintéloc	Audi R8 LMS Evo II	(Switzerland) Lucas Legeret	(Germany) Christopher Mies	(Switzerland) Patric Niederhauser	
32	(Belgium) Audi Sport Team WRT	Audi R8 LMS Evo II	(Belgium) Dries Vanthoor	(South Africa) Kelvin van der Linde	(Belgium) Charles Weerts	
38	(United Kingdom) Jota	McLaren 720S GT3	(United Kingdom) Rob Bell	(Switzerland) Marvin Kirchhöfer	(United Kingdom) Ollie Wilkinson	
46	(Italy) Monster VR46 with Team WRT	Audi R8 LMS Evo II	(Switzerland) Nico Müller	(Belgium) Frédéric Vervisch	(Italy) Valentino Rossi	
47	(Hong Kong) KCMG	Porsche 911 GT3 R	(Norway) Dennis Olsen	(United Kingdom) Nick Tandy	(Belgium) Laurens Vanthoor	
50	(Germany) BMW Junior Team with ROWE Racing	BMW M4 GT3	(United Kingdom) Daniel Harper	(Germany) Max Hesse	(United States) Neil Verhagen	
51	(Italy) Iron Lynx	Ferrari 488 GT3 Evo 2020	(United Kingdom) James Calado	(Spain) Miguel Molina	(Denmark) Nicklas Nielsen	
54	(Italy) Dinamic Motorsport	Porsche 911 GT3 R	(Austria) Klaus Bachler	(France) Côme Ledogar	(Austria) Thomas Preining	
55	(Hong Kong) AMG Team GruppeM Racing	Mercedes-AMG GT3 Evo	(Germany) Maximilian Buhk	(Germany) Maro Engel	(Canada) Mikaël Grenier	
63	(Switzerland) Emil Frey Racing	Lamborghini Huracán GT3 Evo	(United Kingdom) Jack Aitken	(Italy) Mirko Bortolotti	(Spain) Albert Costa	
66	(Germany) Audi Sport Team Attempto	Audi R8 LMS Evo II	(Germany) Dennis Marschall	(Switzerland) Ricardo Feller	(Germany) Markus Winkelhock	
71	(Italy) Iron Lynx	Ferrari 488 GT3 Evo 2020	(Italy) Antonio Fuoco	(Italy) Davide Rigon	(Brazil) Daniel Serra	
74	(Australia) EMA Motorsport	Porsche 911 GT3 R	(Australia) Matt Campbell	(France) Mathieu Jaminet	(Brazil) Felipe Nasr	
88	(France) AMG Team AKKodis ASP	Mercedes-AMG GT3 Evo	(France) Jules Gounon	(Spain) Daniel Juncadella	(Switzerland) Raffaele Marciello	
95	(United Kingdom) Beechdean AMR	Aston Martin Vantage AMR GT3	(Belgium) Maxime Martin	(Denmark) Marco Sørensen	(Denmark) Nicki Thiim	
98	(Germany) ROWE Racing	BMW M4 GT3	(Netherlands) Nicky Catsburg	(Brazil) Augusto Farfus	(United Kingdom) Nick Yelloly	
100	(Germany) Toksport WRT	Porsche 911 GT3 R	(France) Julien Andlauer	(Germany) Marvin Dienst	(Germany) Sven Muller	
221	(United Arab Emirates) GPX Martini Racing	Porsche 911 GT3 R	(Denmark) Michael Christensen	(France) Kévin Estre	(Austria) Richard Lietz	
Silver Cup (19 entries)
3	(Germany) Team GetSpeed Performance	Mercedes-AMG GT3 Evo	(France) Sébastien Baud	(Denmark) Valdemar Eriksen	(Canada) Jeff Kingsley	
4	(Germany) Haupt Racing Team	Mercedes-AMG GT3 Evo	(United Kingdom) Frank Bird	(Germany) Jannes Fittje	(Australia) Jordan Love	(Switzerland) Alain Valente
11	(Italy) Tresor by Car Collection	Audi R8 LMS Evo II	(Italy) Daniele di Amato	(Italy) Alberto di Folco	(France) Pierre-Alexandre Jean	(Italy) Lorenzo Patrese
14	(Switzerland) Emil Frey Racing	Lamborghini Huracán GT3 Evo	(Finland) Konsta Lappalainen	(Finland) Tuomas Tujula	(South Africa) Stuart White	
22	(Germany) Allied Racing	Porsche 911 GT3 R	(Germany) Vincent Andronaco	(Switzerland) Dominik Fischli	(Denmark) Patrik Matthiesen	(Germany) Joel Sturm
26	(France) Saintéloc Junior Team	Audi R8 LMS Evo II	(Belgium) Nicolas Baert	(France) Cesar Gazeau	(Belgium) Gilles Magnus	(France) Aurélien Panis
27	(Germany) Leipert Motorsport	Lamborghini Huracán GT3 Evo	(United States) Tyler Cooke	(New Zealand) Brendon Leitch	(Spain) Isaac Tutumlu	(Netherlands) Max Weering
28	(Canada) ST Racing	BMW M4 GT3	(United States) Harry Gottsacker	(Netherlands) Maxime Oosten	(Canada) Nick Wittmer	(Canada) Samantha Tan
30	(United Kingdom) ROFGO Racing with Team WRT	Audi R8 LMS Evo II	(Denmark) Benjamin Goethe	(France) Thomas Neubauer	(France) Jean-Baptiste Simmenauer	
31	(Belgium) Team WRT	Audi R8 LMS Evo II	(United Kingdom) Finlay Hutchison	(Mexico) Diego Menchaca	(United Kingdom) Lewis Proctor	
56	(Italy) Dinamic Motorsport	Porsche 911 GT3 R	(Switzerland) Mauro Calamia	(Norway) Marius Nakken	(Denmark) Mikkel O. Pedersen	(Italy) Giorgio Roda
87	(France) AKKodis ASP Team	Mercedes-AMG GT3 Evo	(France) Thomas Drouet	(Italy) Tommaso Mosca	(United Kingdom) Casper Stevenson	
90	(Spain) Madpanda Motorsport	Mercedes-AMG GT3 Evo	(Argentina) Ezequiel Pérez Companc	(Finland) Patrick Kujala	(Colombia) Óscar Tunjo	(United Kingdom) Sean Walkinshaw
97	(United Kingdom) Beechdean AMR	Aston Martin Vantage AMR GT3	(Canada) Roman De Angelis	(United Kingdom) Charlie Fagg	(France) Théo Nouet	(United Kingdom) David Pittard
99	(Germany) Attempto Racing	Audi R8 LMS Evo II	(Germany) Alex Aka	(Finland) Juuso Puhakka	(Austria) Nicolas Schöll	(Germany) Marius Zug
159	(United Kingdom) Garage 59	McLaren 720S GT3	(United Kingdom) James Baldwin	(Denmark) Nicolai Kjærgaard	(Venezuela) Manuel Maldonado	(Canada) Ethan Simioni
163	(Italy) Vincenzo Sospiri Racing	Lamborghini Huracán GT3 Evo	(Mexico) Michael Dörrbecker	(Italy) Mattia Michelotto	(Belgium) Baptiste Moulin	(Norway) Marcus Paverud
563	(Italy) Vincenzo Sospiri Racing	Lamborghini Huracán GT3 Evo	(Poland) Karol Basz	(Italy) Michele Beretta	(Chile) Benjamin Hites	(Japan) Yuki Nemoto
777	(Oman) Al Manar Racing by HRT	Mercedes-AMG GT3 Evo	(Zimbabwe) Axcil Jefferies	(Canada) Daniel Morad	(Germany) Fabian Schiller	(Oman) Al Faisal Al Zubair
Gold Cup (15 entries)
5	(Germany) Haupt Racing Team	Mercedes-AMG GT3 Evo	(Germany) Hubert Haupt	(India) Arjun Maini	(Italy) Gabriele Piana	(Germany) Florian Scholze
7	(United Kingdom) Inception Racing with Optimum Motorsport	McLaren 720S GT3	(United States) Brendan Iribe	(United Kingdom) Ollie Millroy	(Guernsey) Sebastian Priaulx	(Denmark) Frederik Schandorff
8	(France) AGS Events	Lamborghini Huracán GT3 Evo	(France) Loris Cabirou	(France) Nicolas Gomar	(France) Mike Parisy	(Netherlands) Ruben del Sarte
10	(Belgium) Boutsen Ginion Racing	Audi R8 LMS Evo II	(France) Adam Eteki	(France) Antoine Leclerc	(Belgium) Benjamin Lessennes	(Saudi Arabia) Karim Ojjeh
21	(Italy) AF Corse	Ferrari 488 GT3 Evo 2020	(Italy) Alessandro Balzan	(Italy) Hugo Delacour	(South Africa) David Perel	(Monaco) Cedric Sbirrazzuoli
33	(Belgium) Team WRT	Audi R8 LMS Evo II	(Belgium) Ulysse De Pauw	(France) Arnold Robin	(France) Maxime Robin	(Japan) Ryuichiro Tomita
34	(Germany) Walkenhorst Motorsport	BMW M4 GT3	(United States) Michael Dinan	(United States) Robby Foley	(United States) Richard Heistand	(Germany) Jens Klingmann
44	(Germany) Team GetSpeed Performance	Mercedes-AMG GT3 Evo	(Germany) Patrick Assenheimer	(France) Michael Blanchemain	(Finland) Axel Blom	(France) Jim Pla
57	(United States) Winward Racing	Mercedes-AMG GT3 Evo	(Austria) Lucas Auer	(Italy) Lorenzo Ferrari	(Germany) Jens Liebhauser	(United States) Russel Ward
77	(United Kingdom) Barwell Motorsport	Lamborghini Huracán GT3 Evo	(Oman) Ahmad Al Harthy	(United Kingdom) Sam de Haan	(United Kingdom) Alex MacDowall	(United Kingdom) Sandy Mitchell
83	(Italy) Iron Dames	Ferrari 488 GT3 Evo 2020	(Belgium) Sarah Bovy	(Switzerland) Rahel Frey	(Denmark) Michelle Gatting	(France) Doriane Pin
91	(Germany) Allied Racing	Porsche 911 GT3 R	(Switzerland) Julien Apotheloz	(Turkey) Ayhancan Güven	(France) Florian Latorre	Alex Malykhin
93	(United Kingdom) Sky - Tempesta Racing by HRT	Mercedes-AMG GT3 Evo	(Italy) Eddie Cheever III	(United Kingdom) Christopher Froggatt	(Hong Kong) Jonathan Hui	(Italy) Loris Spinelli
107	(France) CMR	Bentley Continental GT3	(Belgium) Nigel Bailly	(Switzerland) Antonin Borga	(Belgium) Stéphane Lémeret	(Belgium) Maxime Soulet
911	(Germany) Herberth Motorsport	Porsche 911 GT3 R	(Germany) Ralf Bohn	(Germany) Alfred Renauer	(Germany) Thomas Renauer	
Pro-Am Cup (7 entries)
9	(Germany) Herberth Motorsport	Porsche 911 GT3 R	(Hong Kong) Antares Au	(New Zealand) Jaxon Evans	(Macau) Kevin Tse	(Luxembourg) Dylan Pereira
16	(Australia) EBM Grove Racing	Porsche 911 GT3 R	(Australia) Brenton Grove	(Australia) Stephen Grove	(New Zealand) Matthew Payne	(Malaysia) Adrian D'Silva
24	(Switzerland) Porsche Zentrum Oberer Zürichsee by Herberth	Porsche 911 GT3 R	(Germany) Stefan Aust	(Switzerland) Nicolas Leutwiler	(Germany) Nico Menzel	(Belgium) Alessio Picariello
39	(Thailand) Singha Racing Team TP 12	Porsche 911 GT3 R	(New Zealand) Earl Bamber	(Thailand) Piti Bhirombhakdi	(France) Christophe Hamon	(Thailand) Tanart Sathienthirakul
52	(Italy) AF Corse	Ferrari 488 GT3 Evo 2020	(Italy) Andrea Bertolini	(Italy) Stefano Costantini	(Belgium) Louis Machiels	(Italy) Alessio Rovera
75	(Australia) SunEnergy1 Racing - by SPS	Mercedes-AMG GT3 Evo	(Austria) Dominik Baumann	(United Kingdom) Philip Ellis	(Australia) Kenny Habul	(Austria) Martin Konrad
188	(United Kingdom) Garage 59	McLaren 720S GT3	(Portugal) Henrique Chaves	(United Kingdom) Dean MacDonald	(Portugal) Miguel Ramos	(Sweden) Alexander West
Bronze Cup (2 entries)
20	(Germany) SPS Automotive Performance	Mercedes-AMG GT3 Evo	(Saudi Arabia) Reema Juffali	(United States) George Kurtz	(Germany) Tim Müller	(Germany) Valentin Pierburg
35	(Germany) Walkenhorst Motorsport	BMW M4 GT3	(Germany) Jörg Breuer	(Germany) Theo Oeverhaus	(Germany) Henry Walkenhorst	(United States) Don Yount

- Alex Malykhin competed with a neutral flag as Russian and Belarusian national emblems were banned by the FIA following the Russian invasion of Ukraine.

== Qualifying Results ==
=== Qualifying ===
Fastest times for each car are denoted in bold.
Pole positions in each class are denoted in bold.

Pos.	Class	No.	Team	Car	Overall Time	Time 1	Time 2	Time 3	Time 4
1	Pro	71	(Italy) Iron Lynx	Ferrari 488 GT3 Evo 2020	2:16.920		**2:16.486**	2:17.219	2:17.057
2	Pro	51	(Italy) Iron Lynx	Ferrari 488 GT3 Evo 2020	2:17.098		2:17.455	2:17.085	**2:16.756**
3	Pro	6	(United States) Orange 1 K-PAX Racing	Lamborghini Huracán GT3 Evo	2:17.237		**2:16.905**	2:17.434	2:17.373
4	Pro	12	(Italy) Audi Sport Team Tresor	Audi R8 LMS Evo II	2:17.307		2:17.633	2:17.322	**2:16.966**
5	Pro	32	(Belgium) Audi Sport Team WRT	Audi R8 LMS Evo II	2:17.360		**2:17.303**	2:17.363	2:17.414
6	Pro	98	(Germany) ROWE Racing	BMW M4 GT3	2:17.430		2:17.288	2:17.044	**2:16.960**
7	Pro	66	(Germany) Audi Sport Team Attempto	Audi R8 LMS Evo II	2:17.485		**2:17.278**	2:17.856	2:17.323
8	Pro	2	(Germany) AMG Team GetSpeed	Mercedes-AMG GT3 Evo	2:17.486		2:17.986	2:17.838	**2:17.635**
9	Pro	88	(France) AMG Team AKKodis ASP	Mercedes-AMG GT3 Evo	2:17.565		2:17.686	2:17.882	**2:17.129**
10	Pro	55	(Hong Kong) AMG Team GruppeM Racing	Mercedes-AMG GT3 Evo	2:17.577		2:17.739	2:17.812	**2:17.182**
11	Pro	54	(Italy) Dinamic Motorsport	Porsche 911 GT3 R	2:17.594		2:18.040	2:17.845	**2:16.899**
12	Pro	63	(Switzerland) Emil Frey Racing	Lamborghini Huracán GT3 Evo	2:17.602		2:18.162	**2:17.273**	2:17.371
13	Pro	95	(United Kingdom) Beechdean AMR	Aston Martin Vantage AMR GT3	2:17.607		2:17.484	2:17.983	**2:17.354**
14	Pro	100	(Germany) Toksport WRT	Porsche 911 GT3 R	2:17.636		2:17.344	2:18.222	**2:17.342**
15	Pro	25	(France) Audi Sport Team Saintéloc	Audi R8 LMS Evo II	2:17.704		2:17.960	2:18.185	**2:16.969**
16	Silver	14	(Switzerland) Emil Frey Racing	Lamborghini Huracán GT3 Evo	2:17.750		2:18.102	2:18.040	**2:17.110**
17	Silver	30	(United Kingdom) ROFGO Racing with Team WRT	Audi R8 LMS Evo II	2:17.769		2:17.387	2:18.536	**2:17.384**
18	Pro	19	(Switzerland) Emil Frey Racing	Lamborghini Huracán GT3 Evo	2:17.773		2:18.574	2:17.615	**2:17.132**
19	Pro	221	(United Arab Emirates) GPX Martini Racing	Porsche 911 GT3 R	2:17.824		2:18.223	2:18.615	**2:16.943**
20	Silver	777	(Oman) Al Manar Racing by HRT	Mercedes-AMG GT3 Evo	2:17.840	2:18.147	2:18.738	2:17.863	**2:16.612**
21	Pro	50	(Germany) BMW Junior Team with ROWE Racing	BMW M4 GT3	2:17.974		2:18.220	2:18.048	**2:17.654**
22	Pro	74	(Australia) EMA Motorsport	Porsche 911 GT3 R	2:18.090		2:19.176	2:17.790	**2:17.304**
23	Pro	23	(United States) Heart of Racing with TF Sport	Aston Martin Vantage AMR GT3	2:18.101		2:17.639	2:19.092	**2:17.582**
24	Silver	87	(France) AKKodis ASP Team	Mercedes-AMG GT3 Evo	2:18.174		2:18.558	2:18.256	**2:17.709**
25	Pro	46	(Italy) Monster VR46 with Team WRT	Audi R8 LMS Evo II	2:18.219		2:18.618	2:18.407	**2:17.633**
26	Silver	159	(United Kingdom) Garage 59	McLaren 720S GT3	2:18.264	2:18.652	2:18.164	**2:17.976**	2:18.265
27	Silver	4	(Germany) Haupt Racing Team	Mercedes-AMG GT3 Evo	2:18.278	2:18.863	**2:17.956**	2:18.306	2:17.990
28	Pro	38	(United Kingdom) Jota	McLaren 720S GT3	2:18.313		**2:17.262**	2:19.912	2:17.765
29	**Gold**	**77**	**(United Kingdom) Barwell Motorsport**	**Lamborghini Huracán GT3 Evo**	2:18.325	2:18.536	2:18.444	2:19.126	**2:17.194**
30	Silver	11	(Italy) Tresor by Car Collection	Audi R8 LMS Evo II	2:18.440	2:19.317	2:18.746	**2:17.642**	2:18.056
31	Gold	57	(United States) Winward Racing	Mercedes-AMG GT3 Evo	2:18.444	2:19.771	2:18.949	2:18.567	**2:16.491**
32	Silver	563	(Italy) Vincenzo Sospiri Racing	Lamborghini Huracán GT3 Evo	2:18.456	2:18.840	2:18.388	2:18.409	**2:18.190**
33	Silver	31	(Belgium) Team WRT	Audi R8 LMS Evo II	2:18.538		2:18.654	**2:18.199**	2:18.673
34	Silver	99	(Germany) Attempto Racing	Audi R8 LMS Evo II	2:18.562	2:18.329	2:19.088	2:18.615	**2:18.216**
35	Silver	26	(France) Saintéloc Junior Team	Audi R8 LMS Evo II	2:18.578	2:18.380	2:18.915	**2:18.299**	2:18.718
36	Silver	90	(Spain) Madpanda Motorsport	Mercedes-AMG GT3 Evo	2:18.696	2:19.612	2:19.023	2:18.278	**2:17.873**
37	Gold	34	(Germany) Walkenhorst Motorsport	BMW M4 GT3	2:18.723	2:20.126	2:18.418	2:18.703	**2:18.646**
38	Gold	91	(Germany) Allied Racing	Porsche 911 GT3 R	2:18.806	2:19.609	2:18.510	2:18.961	**2:18.145**
39	Gold	5	(Germany) Haupt Racing Team	Mercedes-AMG GT3 Evo	2:18.811	2:19.704	2:19.026	2:20.102	**2:17.415**
40	Gold	21	(Italy) AF Corse	Ferrari 488 GT3 Evo 2020	2:18.825	2:21.109	2:18.660	2:18.181	**2:17.391**
41	**Pro-Am**	**52**	**(Italy) AF Corse**	**Ferrari 488 GT3 Evo 2020**	2:18.829	2:19.224	2:20.182	2:18.283	**2:17.609**
42	Gold	7	(United Kingdom) Inception Racing with Optimum Motorsport	McLaren 720S GT3	2:18.850	2:19.898	2:19.662	2:18.222	**2:17.659**
43	Silver	97	(United Kingdom) Beechdean AMR	Aston Martin Vantage AMR GT3	2:18.945	**2:18.375**	2:19.162	2:19.206	2:19.037
44	Gold	33	(Belgium) Team WRT	Audi R8 LMS Evo II	2:18.965	2:19.817	2:18.446	**2:18.406**	2:19.195
45	Gold	93	(United Kingdom) Sky - Tempesta Racing by HRT	Mercedes-AMG GT3 Evo	2:19.014	2:20.914	2:18.011	2:19.559	**2:17.574**
46	Silver	56	(Italy) Dinamic Motorsport	Porsche 911 GT3 R	2:19.177	2:19.651	2:19.526	2:19.905	**2:17.627**
47	Gold	83	(Italy) Iron Dames	Ferrari 488 GT3 Evo 2020	2:19.192	2:19.653	2:19.122	2:19.693	**2:18.301**
48	Gold	10	(Belgium) Boutsen Ginion Racing	Audi R8 LMS Evo II	2:19.217	2:21.122	2:18.374	2:19.662	**2:17.711**
49	Pro-Am	24	(Switzerland) Porsche Zentrum Oberer Zürichsee by Herberth	Porsche 911 GT3 R	2:19.312	2:21.773	2:20.454	2:18.014	**2:17.010**
50	Pro-Am	188	(United Kingdom) Garage 59	McLaren 720S GT3	2:19.317	2:22.075	2:19.630	2:18.077	**2:17.488**
51	Pro-Am	75	(Australia) SunEnergy1 Racing - by SPS	Mercedes-AMG GT3 Evo	2:19.429	2:18.826	2:19.729	2:20.789	**2:17.373**
52	Silver	163	(Italy) Vincenzo Sospiri Racing	Lamborghini Huracán GT3 Evo	2:19.695	2:20.188	2:20.391	**2:18.980**	2:19.224
53	Pro-Am	9	(Germany) Herberth Motorsport	Porsche 911 GT3 R	2:19.996	2:22.334	2:20.775	2:18.557	**2:18.300**
54	Pro-Am	39	(Thailand) Singha Racing Team TP 12	Porsche 911 GT3 R	2:20.077	2:22.167	2:21.139	2:19.544	**2:17.459**
55	Silver	22	(Germany) Allied Racing	Porsche 911 GT3 R	2:20.356	2:21.732	2:21.715	**2:18.418**	2:19.559
56	Gold	107	(France) CMR	Bentley Continental GT3	2:20.459	2:25.528	2:19.923	2:18.348	**2:18.039**
57	Gold	8	(France) AGS Events	Lamborghini Huracán GT3 Evo	2:21.042	2:23.641	2:21.678	**2:19.204**	2:19.647
58	Silver	28	(Canada) ST Racing	BMW M4 GT3	2:21.479	2:22.591	2:22.240	**2:19.934**	2:21.152
59	**Bronze**	**20**	**(Germany) SPS Automotive Performance**	Mercedes-AMG GT3 Evo	2:21.716	2:22.033	2:22.287	2:22.425	**2:20.120**
60	Pro-Am	16	(Australia) EBM Grove Racing	Porsche 911 GT3 R	2:21.908	2:24.531	2:23.097	2:20.895	**2:19.112**
61	Gold	44	(Germany) Team GetSpeed Performance	Mercedes-AMG GT3 Evo	2:22.360	2:18.375	2:25.545	2:27.850	**2:17.670**
62	Bronze	35	(Germany) Walkenhorst Motorsport	BMW M4 GT3	2:24.125	2:23.614	2:26.220	2:27.598	**2:19.068**
63	Silver	3	(Germany) Team GetSpeed Performance	Mercedes-AMG GT3 Evo	2:20.273		2:20.350		**2:20.197**
64	Pro	47	(Hong Kong) KCMG	Porsche 911 GT3 R	2:17.468		**2:20.197**		
65	Silver	27	(Germany) Leipert Motorsport	Lamborghini Huracán GT3 Evo	2:20.435	2:21.232	**2:19.638**		
66	Gold	911	(Germany) Herberth Motorsport	Porsche 911 GT3 R	No Time				

=== Super Pole ===
Pole positions in each class are denoted in bold.

Pos.	Class	No.	Team	Driver	Car	Time	Gap
1	**Pro**	**6**	**(United States) Orange 1 K-PAX Racing**	**(Italy) Andrea Caldarelli**	**Lamborghini Huracán GT3 Evo**	**2:16.221**	–
2	Pro	88	(France) AMG Team AKKodis ASP	(Switzerland) Raffaele Marciello	Mercedes-AMG GT3 Evo	2:16.375	+0.154
3	Pro	54	(Italy) Dinamic Motorsport	(Austria) Klaus Bachler	Porsche 911 GT3 R	2:16.446	+0.225
4	Pro	2	(Germany) AMG Team GetSpeed	(Germany) Luca Stolz	Mercedes-AMG GT3 Evo	2:16.589	+0.368
5	Pro	63	(Switzerland) Emil Frey Racing	(Italy) Mirko Bortolotti	Lamborghini Huracán GT3 Evo	2:16.620	+0.399
6	Pro	221	(United Arab Emirates) GPX Martini Racing	(France) Kévin Estre	Porsche 911 GT3 R	2:16.702	+0.481
7	Pro	12	(Italy) Audi Sport Team Tresor	(Italy) Mattia Drudi	Audi R8 LMS Evo II	2:16.726	+0.505
8	Pro	66	(Germany) Audi Sport Team Attempto	(Switzerland) Ricardo Feller	Audi R8 LMS Evo II	2:16.755	+0.534
9	**Silver**	**777**	**(Oman) Al Manar Racing by HRT**	**(Germany) Fabian Schiller**	**Mercedes-AMG GT3 Evo**	**2:16.774**	**+0.553**
10	Pro	55	(Hong Kong) AMG Team GruppeM Racing	(Germany) Maro Engel	Mercedes-AMG GT3 Evo	2:16.865	+0.664
11	Pro	71	(Italy) Iron Lynx	(Italy) Antonio Fuoco	Ferrari 488 GT3 Evo 2020	2:16.892	+0.671
12	Pro	19	(Switzerland) Emil Frey Racing	(Italy) Giacomo Altoè	Lamborghini Huracán GT3 Evo	2:16.918	+0.697
13	Pro	51	(Italy) Iron Lynx	(Denmark) Nicklas Nielsen	Ferrari 488 GT3 Evo 2020	2:16.932	+0.711
14	Pro	100	(Germany) Toksport WRT	(Germany) Sven Müller	Porsche 911 GT3 R	2:17.030	+0.809
15	Pro	32	(Belgium) Audi Sport Team WRT	(Belgium) Dries Vanthoor	Audi R8 LMS Evo II	2:17.061	+0.840
16	Pro	98	(Germany) ROWE Racing	(Netherlands) Nicky Catsburg	BMW M4 GT3	2:17.069	+0.848
17	Pro	95	(United Kingdom) Beechdean AMR	(Belgium) Maxime Martin	Aston Martin Vantage AMR GT3	2:17.170	+0.949
18	Pro	25	(France) Audi Sport Team Saintéloc	(Switzerland) Patric Niederhauser	Audi R8 LMS Evo II	2:17.271	+1.050
19	Silver	30	(United Kingdom) ROFGO Racing with Team WRT	(France) Thomas Neubauer	Audi R8 LMS Evo II	2:17.347	+1.126
20	Silver	14	(Switzerland) Emil Frey Racing	(Finland) Konsta Lappalainen	Lamborghini Huracán GT3 Evo	2:17.475	+1.254

== Race results ==
Class winners denoted in bold and with ‡

Pos	Class	No.	Team	Drivers	Car	Laps	Time/Retired
Pos	Class	No.	Team	Drivers	Engine	Laps	Time/Retired
1	P	**88**	**(France) AMG Team AKKodis ASP**	**(France) Jules Gounon (Spain) Daniel Juncadella (Switzerland) Raffaele Marciello**	**Mercedes-AMG GT3 Evo**	**536**	**24:00:36.729‡**
1	P	**88**	**(France) AMG Team AKKodis ASP**	**(France) Jules Gounon (Spain) Daniel Juncadella (Switzerland) Raffaele Marciello**	**Mercedes-AMG M159 6.2 L V8**	**536**	**24:00:36.729‡**
2	P	2	(Germany) BWT AMG - Team GetSpeed	(Germany) Maximilian Götz (Netherlands) Steijn Schothorst (Germany) Luca Stolz	Mercedes-AMG GT3 Evo	536	+31.040
2	P	2	(Germany) BWT AMG - Team GetSpeed	(Germany) Maximilian Götz (Netherlands) Steijn Schothorst (Germany) Luca Stolz	Mercedes-AMG M159 6.2 L V8	536	+31.040
3	P	71	(Italy) Iron Lynx	(Italy) Antonio Fuoco (Italy) Davide Rigon (Brazil) Daniel Serra	Ferrari 488 GT3 Evo 2020	536	+46.926
3	P	71	(Italy) Iron Lynx	(Italy) Antonio Fuoco (Italy) Davide Rigon (Brazil) Daniel Serra	Ferrari F154CB 3.9 L Twin-turbo V8	536	+46.926
4	P	55	(Hong Kong) AMG Team GruppeM Racing	(Germany) Maximilian Buhk (Germany) Maro Engel (Canada) Mikaël Grenier	Mercedes-AMG GT3 Evo	536	+48.430
4	P	55	(Hong Kong) AMG Team GruppeM Racing	(Germany) Maximilian Buhk (Germany) Maro Engel (Canada) Mikaël Grenier	Mercedes-AMG M159 6.2 L V8	536	+48.430
5	P	50	(Germany) BMW Junior Team with Rowe Racing	(United Kingdom) Daniel Harper (Germany) Max Hesse (United States) Neil Verhagen	BMW M4 GT3	536	+1:01.266
5	P	50	(Germany) BMW Junior Team with Rowe Racing	(United Kingdom) Daniel Harper (Germany) Max Hesse (United States) Neil Verhagen	BMW P58 3.0 L Turbo I6	536	+1:01.266
6	P	98	(Germany) Rowe Racing	(Netherlands) Nicky Catsburg (Brazil) Augusto Farfus (United Kingdom) Nick Yelloly	BMW M4 GT3	536	+1:09.006
6	P	98	(Germany) Rowe Racing	(Netherlands) Nicky Catsburg (Brazil) Augusto Farfus (United Kingdom) Nick Yelloly	BMW P58 3.0 L Turbo I6	536	+1:09.006
7	P	47	(Hong Kong) KC Motorgroup	(Norway) Dennis Olsen (United Kingdom) Nick Tandy (Belgium) Laurens Vanthoor	Porsche 911 GT3 R (991.II)	536	+1:13.409
7	P	47	(Hong Kong) KC Motorgroup	(Norway) Dennis Olsen (United Kingdom) Nick Tandy (Belgium) Laurens Vanthoor	Porsche 4.0 L Flat-6	536	+1:13.409
8	P	38	(United Kingdom) Jota Sport	(United Kingdom) Rob Bell (Switzerland) Marvin Kirchhöfer (United Kingdom) Ollie Wilkinson	McLaren 720S GT3	536	+2:13.544
8	P	38	(United Kingdom) Jota Sport	(United Kingdom) Rob Bell (Switzerland) Marvin Kirchhöfer (United Kingdom) Ollie Wilkinson	McLaren M840T 4.0 L Turbo V8	536	+2:13.544
9	P	51	(Italy) Iron Lynx	(United Kingdom) James Calado (Spain) Miguel Molina (Denmark) Nicklas Nielsen	Ferrari 488 GT3 Evo 2020	535	+1 lap
9	P	51	(Italy) Iron Lynx	(United Kingdom) James Calado (Spain) Miguel Molina (Denmark) Nicklas Nielsen	Ferrari F154CB 3.9 L Twin-turbo V8	535	+1 lap
10	P	95	(United Kingdom) Beechdean AMR	(Belgium) Maxime Martin (Denmark) Marco Sørensen (Denmark) Nicki Thiim	Aston Martin Vantage AMR GT3	534	+2 laps
10	P	95	(United Kingdom) Beechdean AMR	(Belgium) Maxime Martin (Denmark) Marco Sørensen (Denmark) Nicki Thiim	Aston Martin M177 4.0 L Turbo V8	534	+2 laps
11	P	6	(United States) Orange 1 K-Pax Racing	(Italy) Andrea Caldarelli (Switzerland) Marco Mapelli (South Africa) Jordan Pepper	Lamborghini Huracán GT3 Evo	534	+2 laps
11	P	6	(United States) Orange 1 K-Pax Racing	(Italy) Andrea Caldarelli (Switzerland) Marco Mapelli (South Africa) Jordan Pepper	Lamborghini DGF 5.2 L V10	534	+2 laps
12	P	66	(Germany) Audi Sport Team Attempto	(Germany) Dennis Marschall (Switzerland) Ricardo Feller (Germany) Markus Winkelhock	Audi R8 LMS Evo II	534	+2 laps
12	P	66	(Germany) Audi Sport Team Attempto	(Germany) Dennis Marschall (Switzerland) Ricardo Feller (Germany) Markus Winkelhock	Audi DAR 5.2 L V10	534	+2 laps
13	S	**30**	**(United Kingdom) ROFGO Racing with Team WRT**	**(Denmark) Benjamin Goethe (France) Thomas Neubauer (France) Jean-Baptiste Simmenauer**	**Audi R8 LMS Evo II**	**533**	**+3 laps‡**
13	S	**30**	**(United Kingdom) ROFGO Racing with Team WRT**	**(Denmark) Benjamin Goethe (France) Thomas Neubauer (France) Jean-Baptiste Simmenauer**	**Audi DAR 5.2 L V10**	**533**	**+3 laps‡**
14	P	19	(Switzerland) Emil Frey Racing	(Italy) Giacomo Altoè (France) Arthur Rougier (France) Léo Roussel	Lamborghini Huracán GT3 Evo	533	+3 laps
14	P	19	(Switzerland) Emil Frey Racing	(Italy) Giacomo Altoè (France) Arthur Rougier (France) Léo Roussel	Lamborghini DGF 5.2 L V10	533	+3 laps
15	S	99	(Germany) Attempto Racing	(Germany) Alex Aka (Finland) Juuso Puhakka (Austria) Nicolas Schöll (Germany) Marius Zug	Audi R8 LMS Evo II	533	+3 laps
15	S	99	(Germany) Attempto Racing	(Germany) Alex Aka (Finland) Juuso Puhakka (Austria) Nicolas Schöll (Germany) Marius Zug	Audi DAR 5.2 L V10	533	+3 laps
16	S	14	(Switzerland) Emil Frey Racing	(Finland) Konsta Lappalainen (Finland) Tuomas Tujula (South Africa) Stuart White	Lamborghini Huracán GT3 Evo	532	+4 laps
16	S	14	(Switzerland) Emil Frey Racing	(Finland) Konsta Lappalainen (Finland) Tuomas Tujula (South Africa) Stuart White	Lamborghini DGF 5.2 L V10	532	+4 laps
17	P	46	(Italy) Monster VR46 with Team WRT	(Switzerland) Nico Müller (Italy) Valentino Rossi (Belgium) Frédéric Vervisch	Audi R8 LMS Evo II	531	+5 Laps
17	P	46	(Italy) Monster VR46 with Team WRT	(Switzerland) Nico Müller (Italy) Valentino Rossi (Belgium) Frédéric Vervisch	Audi DAR 5.2 L V10	531	+5 Laps
18	G	**83**	**(Italy) Iron Dames**	**(Belgium) Sarah Bovy (Switzerland) Rahel Frey (Denmark) Michelle Gatting (France) Doriane Pin**	**Ferrari 488 GT3 Evo 2020**	**531**	**+5 Laps‡**
18	G	**83**	**(Italy) Iron Dames**	**(Belgium) Sarah Bovy (Switzerland) Rahel Frey (Denmark) Michelle Gatting (France) Doriane Pin**	**Ferrari F154CB 3.9 L Twin-turbo V8**	**531**	**+5 Laps‡**
19	P	25	(France) Audi Sport Team Saintéloc	(Switzerland) Lucas Légeret (Germany) Christopher Mies (Switzerland) Patric Niederhauser	Audi R8 LMS Evo II	531	+5 Laps
19	P	25	(France) Audi Sport Team Saintéloc	(Switzerland) Lucas Légeret (Germany) Christopher Mies (Switzerland) Patric Niederhauser	Audi DAR 5.2 L V10	531	+5 Laps
20	PA	**52**	**(Italy) AF Corse**	**(Italy) Andrea Bertolini (Italy) Stefano Costantini (Belgium) Louis Machiels (Italy) Alessio Rovera**	**Ferrari 488 GT3 Evo 2020**	**530**	**+6 Laps‡**
20	PA	**52**	**(Italy) AF Corse**	**(Italy) Andrea Bertolini (Italy) Stefano Costantini (Belgium) Louis Machiels (Italy) Alessio Rovera**	**Ferrari F154CB 3.9 L Twin-turbo V8**	**530**	**+6 Laps‡**
21	S	163	(Italy) Vincenzo Sospiri Racing	(Mexico) Michael Dörrbecker (Italy) Mattia Michelotto (Belgium) Baptiste Moulin (Norway) Marcus Påverud	Lamborghini Huracán GT3 Evo	529	+7 laps
21	S	163	(Italy) Vincenzo Sospiri Racing	(Mexico) Michael Dörrbecker (Italy) Mattia Michelotto (Belgium) Baptiste Moulin (Norway) Marcus Påverud	Lamborghini DGF 5.2 L V10	529	+7 laps
22	P	74	(Australia) EMA Motorsport	(Australia) Matt Campbell (France) Mathieu Jaminet (Brazil) Felipe Nasr	Porsche 911 GT3 R (991.II)	529	+7 laps
22	P	74	(Australia) EMA Motorsport	(Australia) Matt Campbell (France) Mathieu Jaminet (Brazil) Felipe Nasr	Porsche 4.0 L Flat-6	529	+7 laps
23	S	90	(Spain) Madpanda Motorsport	(Finland) Patrick Kujala (Argentina) Ezequiel Pérez Companc (Colombia) Óscar Tunjo (United Kingdom) Sean Walkinshaw	Mercedes-AMG GT3 Evo	528	+8 laps
23	S	90	(Spain) Madpanda Motorsport	(Finland) Patrick Kujala (Argentina) Ezequiel Pérez Companc (Colombia) Óscar Tunjo (United Kingdom) Sean Walkinshaw	Mercedes-AMG M159 6.2 L V8	528	+8 laps
24	G	33	(Belgium) Team WRT	(Belgium) Ulysse De Pauw (France) Arnold Robin (France) Maxime Robin (Japan) Ryuichiro Tomita	Audi R8 LMS Evo II	528	+8 laps
24	G	33	(Belgium) Team WRT	(Belgium) Ulysse De Pauw (France) Arnold Robin (France) Maxime Robin (Japan) Ryuichiro Tomita	Audi DAR 5.2 L V10	528	+8 laps
25	S	56	(Italy) Dinamic Motorsport	(Switzerland) Mauro Calamia (Norway) Marius Nakken (Denmark) Mikkel O. Pedersen (Italy) Giorgio Roda	Porsche 911 GT3 R (991.II)	527	+9 laps
25	S	56	(Italy) Dinamic Motorsport	(Switzerland) Mauro Calamia (Norway) Marius Nakken (Denmark) Mikkel O. Pedersen (Italy) Giorgio Roda	Porsche 4.0 L Flat-6	527	+9 laps
26	G	93	(United Kingdom) Sky - Tempesta Racing by HRT	(Italy) Eddie Cheever III (United Kingdom) Christopher Froggatt (Hong Kong) Jonathan Hui (Italy) Loris Spinelli	Mercedes-AMG GT3 Evo	527	+9 laps
26	G	93	(United Kingdom) Sky - Tempesta Racing by HRT	(Italy) Eddie Cheever III (United Kingdom) Christopher Froggatt (Hong Kong) Jonathan Hui (Italy) Loris Spinelli	Mercedes-AMG M159 6.2 L V8	527	+9 laps
27	G	7	(United Kingdom) Inception Racing with Optimum Motorsport	(United States) Brendan Iribe (United Kingdom) Ollie Millroy (Guernsey) Sebastian Priaulx (Denmark) Frederik Schandorff	McLaren 720S GT3	527	+9 laps
27	G	7	(United Kingdom) Inception Racing with Optimum Motorsport	(United States) Brendan Iribe (United Kingdom) Ollie Millroy (Guernsey) Sebastian Priaulx (Denmark) Frederik Schandorff	McLaren M840T 4.0 L Turbo V8	527	+9 laps
28	PA	75	(Australia) SunEnergy1 Racing - by SPS	(Austria) Dominik Baumann (United Kingdom) Philip Ellis (Australia) Kenny Habul (Austria) Martin Konrad	Mercedes-AMG GT3 Evo	527	+9 laps
28	PA	75	(Australia) SunEnergy1 Racing - by SPS	(Austria) Dominik Baumann (United Kingdom) Philip Ellis (Australia) Kenny Habul (Austria) Martin Konrad	Mercedes-AMG M159 6.2 L V8	527	+9 laps
29	S	22	(Germany) Allied Racing	(Germany) Vincent Andronaco (Switzerland) Dominik Fischli (Denmark) Patrik Matthiesen (Germany) Joel Sturm	Porsche 911 GT3 R (991.II)	526	+10 laps
29	S	22	(Germany) Allied Racing	(Germany) Vincent Andronaco (Switzerland) Dominik Fischli (Denmark) Patrik Matthiesen (Germany) Joel Sturm	Porsche 4.0 L Flat-6	526	+10 laps
30	PA	39	(Thailand) Singha Racing Team TP 12	(New Zealand) Earl Bamber (Thailand) Piti Bhirombhakdi (France) Christophe Hamon (Thailand) Tanart Sathienthirakul	Porsche 911 GT3 R (991.II)	526	+10 laps
30	PA	39	(Thailand) Singha Racing Team TP 12	(New Zealand) Earl Bamber (Thailand) Piti Bhirombhakdi (France) Christophe Hamon (Thailand) Tanart Sathienthirakul	Porsche 4.0 L Flat-6	526	+10 laps
31	G	44	(Germany) GetSpeed Performance	(Germany) Patrick Assenheimer (France) Michael Blanchemain (Finland) Axel Blom (France) Jim Pla	Mercedes-AMG GT3 Evo	524	+12 laps
31	G	44	(Germany) GetSpeed Performance	(Germany) Patrick Assenheimer (France) Michael Blanchemain (Finland) Axel Blom (France) Jim Pla	Mercedes-AMG M159 6.2 L V8	524	+12 laps
32	G	8	(France) AGS Events	(France) Loris Cabirou (Netherlands) Ruben del Sarte (France) Nicolas Gomar (France) Mike Parisy	Lamborghini Huracán GT3 Evo	522	+14 laps
32	G	8	(France) AGS Events	(France) Loris Cabirou (Netherlands) Ruben del Sarte (France) Nicolas Gomar (France) Mike Parisy	Lamborghini DGF 5.2 L V10	522	+14 laps
33	G	21	(Italy) AF Corse	(Italy) Alessandro Balzan (Italy) Hugo Delacour (South Africa) David Perel (Monaco) Cedric Sbirrazzuoli	Ferrari 488 GT3 Evo 2020	519	+17 laps
33	G	21	(Italy) AF Corse	(Italy) Alessandro Balzan (Italy) Hugo Delacour (South Africa) David Perel (Monaco) Cedric Sbirrazzuoli	Ferrari F154CB 3.9 L Twin-turbo V8	519	+17 laps
34	B	**20**	**(Germany) SPS Automotive Performance**	**(Saudi Arabia) Reema Juffali (United States) George Kurtz (Germany) Tim Müller (Germany) Valentin Pierburg**	**Mercedes-AMG GT3 Evo**	**514**	**+22 Laps‡**
34	B	**20**	**(Germany) SPS Automotive Performance**	**(Saudi Arabia) Reema Juffali (United States) George Kurtz (Germany) Tim Müller (Germany) Valentin Pierburg**	**Mercedes-AMG M159 6.2 L V8**	**514**	**+22 Laps‡**
35	S	563	(Italy) Vincenzo Sospiri Racing	(Poland) Karol Basz (Italy) Michele Beretta (Chile) Benjamin Hites (Japan) Yuki Nemoto	Lamborghini Huracán GT3 Evo	514	+22 Laps
35	S	563	(Italy) Vincenzo Sospiri Racing	(Poland) Karol Basz (Italy) Michele Beretta (Chile) Benjamin Hites (Japan) Yuki Nemoto	Lamborghini DGF 5.2 L V10	514	+22 Laps
36	S	28	(Canada) Samantha Tan Racing	(United States) Harry Gottsacker (Netherlands) Maxime Oosten (Canada) Nick Wittmer (Canada) Samantha Tan	BMW M4 GT3	510	+26 Laps
36	S	28	(Canada) Samantha Tan Racing	(United States) Harry Gottsacker (Netherlands) Maxime Oosten (Canada) Nick Wittmer (Canada) Samantha Tan	BMW P58 3.0 L Turbo I6	510	+26 Laps
37	B	35	(Germany) Walkenhorst Motorsport	(Germany) Jörg Breuer (Germany) Theo Oeverhaus (Germany) Henry Walkenhorst (United States) Don Yount	BMW M4 GT3	509	+27 Laps
37	B	35	(Germany) Walkenhorst Motorsport	(Germany) Jörg Breuer (Germany) Theo Oeverhaus (Germany) Henry Walkenhorst (United States) Don Yount	BMW P58 3.0 L Turbo I6	509	+27 Laps
38	P	23	(United States) Heart of Racing with TF Sport	(Republic of Ireland) Charlie Eastwood (United Kingdom) Ross Gunn (Spain) Alex Riberas	Aston Martin Vantage AMR GT3	497	+39 laps
38	P	23	(United States) Heart of Racing with TF Sport	(Republic of Ireland) Charlie Eastwood (United Kingdom) Ross Gunn (Spain) Alex Riberas	Aston Martin M177 4.0 L Turbo V8	497	+39 laps
39	S	31	(Belgium) Team WRT	(United Kingdom) Finlay Hutchison (Mexico) Diego Menchaca (United Kingdom) Lewis Proctor	Audi R8 LMS Evo II	497	+39 laps
39	S	31	(Belgium) Team WRT	(United Kingdom) Finlay Hutchison (Mexico) Diego Menchaca (United Kingdom) Lewis Proctor	Audi DAR 5.2 L V10	497	+39 laps
40	G	57	(United States) Winward Racing	(Austria) Lucas Auer (Italy) Lorenzo Ferrari (Germany) Jens Liebhauser (United States) Russel Ward	Mercedes-AMG GT3 Evo	429	+107 laps
40	G	57	(United States) Winward Racing	(Austria) Lucas Auer (Italy) Lorenzo Ferrari (Germany) Jens Liebhauser (United States) Russel Ward	Mercedes-AMG M159 6.2 L V8	429	+107 laps
41	PA	188	(United Kingdom) Garage 59	(Portugal) Henrique Chaves (United Kingdom) Dean MacDonald (Portugal) Miguel Ramos (Sweden) Alexander West	McLaren 720S GT3	394	+142 laps
41	PA	188	(United Kingdom) Garage 59	(Portugal) Henrique Chaves (United Kingdom) Dean MacDonald (Portugal) Miguel Ramos (Sweden) Alexander West	McLaren M840T 4.0 L Turbo V8	394	+142 laps
42	G	34	(Germany) Walkenhorst Motorsport	(United States) Michael Dinan (United States) Robby Foley (United States) Richard Heistand (Germany) Jens Klingmann	BMW M4 GT3	392	+144 laps
42	G	34	(Germany) Walkenhorst Motorsport	(United States) Michael Dinan (United States) Robby Foley (United States) Richard Heistand (Germany) Jens Klingmann	BMW P58 3.0 L Turbo I6	392	+144 laps
43	PA	24	(Switzerland) Porsche Zentrum Oberer Zürichsee by Herberth	(Germany) Stefan Aust (Switzerland) Nicolas Leutwiler (Germany) Nico Menzel (Belgium) Alessio Picariello	Porsche 911 GT3 R (991.II)	382	+154 laps
43	PA	24	(Switzerland) Porsche Zentrum Oberer Zürichsee by Herberth	(Germany) Stefan Aust (Switzerland) Nicolas Leutwiler (Germany) Nico Menzel (Belgium) Alessio Picariello	Porsche 4.0 L Flat-6	382	+154 laps
DNF	P	100	(Germany) Toksport WRT	(France) Julien Andlauer (Germany) Marvin Dienst (Germany) Sven Muller	Porsche 911 GT3 R (991.II)	374	
DNF	P	100	(Germany) Toksport WRT	(France) Julien Andlauer (Germany) Marvin Dienst (Germany) Sven Muller	Porsche 4.0 L Flat-6	374	
DNF	S	87	(France) AKKodis ASP Team	(France) Thomas Drouet (Italy) Tommaso Mosca (United Kingdom) Casper Stevenson	Mercedes-AMG GT3 Evo	367	
DNF	S	87	(France) AKKodis ASP Team	(France) Thomas Drouet (Italy) Tommaso Mosca (United Kingdom) Casper Stevenson	Mercedes-AMG M159 6.2 L V8	367	
DNF	S	4	(Germany) Haupt Racing Team	(United Kingdom) Frank Bird (Germany) Jannes Fittje (Australia) Jordan Love (Switzerland) Alain Valente	Mercedes-AMG GT3 Evo	333	
DNF	S	4	(Germany) Haupt Racing Team	(United Kingdom) Frank Bird (Germany) Jannes Fittje (Australia) Jordan Love (Switzerland) Alain Valente	Mercedes-AMG M159 6.2 L V8	333	
DNF	G	77	(United Kingdom) Barwell Motorsport	(Oman) Ahmad Al Harthy (United Kingdom) Sam de Haan (United Kingdom) Alex MacDowall (United Kingdom) Sandy Mitchell	Lamborghini Huracán GT3 Evo	333	
DNF	G	77	(United Kingdom) Barwell Motorsport	(Oman) Ahmad Al Harthy (United Kingdom) Sam de Haan (United Kingdom) Alex MacDowall (United Kingdom) Sandy Mitchell	Lamborghini DGF 5.2 L V10	333	
DNF	P	32	(Belgium) Audi Sport Team WRT	(Belgium) Dries Vanthoor (South Africa) Kelvin van der Linde (Belgium) Charles Weerts	Audi R8 LMS Evo II	293	
DNF	P	32	(Belgium) Audi Sport Team WRT	(Belgium) Dries Vanthoor (South Africa) Kelvin van der Linde (Belgium) Charles Weerts	Audi DAR 5.2 L V10	293	
DNF	S	27	(Germany) Leipert Motorsport	(United States) Tyler Cooke (New Zealand) Brendon Leitch (Spain) Isaac Tutumlu (Netherlands) Max Weering	Lamborghini Huracán GT3 Evo	262	
DNF	S	27	(Germany) Leipert Motorsport	(United States) Tyler Cooke (New Zealand) Brendon Leitch (Spain) Isaac Tutumlu (Netherlands) Max Weering	Lamborghini DGF 5.2 L V10	262	
DNF	G	5	(Germany) Haupt Racing Team	(Germany) Hubert Haupt (India) Arjun Maini (Italy) Gabriele Piana (Germany) Florian Scholze	Mercedes-AMG GT3 Evo	256	
DNF	G	5	(Germany) Haupt Racing Team	(Germany) Hubert Haupt (India) Arjun Maini (Italy) Gabriele Piana (Germany) Florian Scholze	Mercedes-AMG M159 6.2 L V8	256	
DNF	S	159	(United Kingdom) Garage 59	(United Kingdom) James Baldwin (Denmark) Nicolai Kjærgaard (Venezuela) Manuel Maldonado (Canada) Ethan Simioni	McLaren 720S GT3	227	
DNF	S	159	(United Kingdom) Garage 59	(United Kingdom) James Baldwin (Denmark) Nicolai Kjærgaard (Venezuela) Manuel Maldonado (Canada) Ethan Simioni	McLaren M840T 4.0 L Turbo V8	227	
DNF	P	221	(United Arab Emirates) GPX Martini Racing	(Denmark) Michael Christensen (France) Kévin Estre (Austria) Richard Lietz	Porsche 911 GT3 R (991.II)	221	
DNF	P	221	(United Arab Emirates) GPX Martini Racing	(Denmark) Michael Christensen (France) Kévin Estre (Austria) Richard Lietz	Porsche 4.0 L Flat-6	221	
DNF	PA	16	(Australia) EBM Grove Racing	(Malaysia) Adrian D'Silva (Australia) Brenton Grove (Australia) Stephen Grove (New Zealand) Matthew Payne	Porsche 911 GT3 R (991.II)	206	
DNF	PA	16	(Australia) EBM Grove Racing	(Malaysia) Adrian D'Silva (Australia) Brenton Grove (Australia) Stephen Grove (New Zealand) Matthew Payne	Porsche 4.0 L Flat-6	206	
DNF	S	3	(Germany) GetSpeed Performance	(France) Sébastien Baud (Denmark) Valdemar Eriksen (Canada) Jeff Kingsley	Mercedes-AMG GT3 Evo	199	
DNF	S	3	(Germany) GetSpeed Performance	(France) Sébastien Baud (Denmark) Valdemar Eriksen (Canada) Jeff Kingsley	Mercedes-AMG M159 6.2 L V8	199	
DNF	G	911	(Germany) Herberth Motorsport	(Germany) Ralf Bohn (Germany) Alfred Renauer (Germany) Thomas Renauer	Porsche 911 GT3 R (991.II)	192	
DNF	G	911	(Germany) Herberth Motorsport	(Germany) Ralf Bohn (Germany) Alfred Renauer (Germany) Thomas Renauer	Porsche 4.0 L Flat-6	192	
DNF	P	63	(Switzerland) Emil Frey Racing	(United Kingdom) Jack Aitken (Italy) Mirko Bortolotti (Spain) Albert Costa	Lamborghini Huracán GT3 Evo	190	
DNF	P	63	(Switzerland) Emil Frey Racing	(United Kingdom) Jack Aitken (Italy) Mirko Bortolotti (Spain) Albert Costa	Lamborghini DGF 5.2 L V10	190	
DNF	G	107	(France) Classic and Modern Racing	(Belgium) Nigel Bailly (Switzerland) Antonin Borga (Belgium) Stéphane Lémeret (Belgium) Maxime Soulet	Bentley Continental GT3	187	
DNF	G	107	(France) Classic and Modern Racing	(Belgium) Nigel Bailly (Switzerland) Antonin Borga (Belgium) Stéphane Lémeret (Belgium) Maxime Soulet	Volkswagen 4.0 L Twin-turbo V8	187	
DNF	P	54	(Italy) Dinamic Motorsport	(Austria) Klaus Bachler (France) Côme Ledogar (Austria) Thomas Preining	Porsche 911 GT3 R (991.II)	176	
DNF	P	54	(Italy) Dinamic Motorsport	(Austria) Klaus Bachler (France) Côme Ledogar (Austria) Thomas Preining	Porsche 4.0 L Flat-6	176	
DNF	S	11	(Italy) Tresor by Car Collection	(Italy) Daniele di Amato (Italy) Alberto di Folco (France) Pierre-Alexandre Jean (Italy) Lorenzo Patrese	Audi R8 LMS Evo II	162	
DNF	S	11	(Italy) Tresor by Car Collection	(Italy) Daniele di Amato (Italy) Alberto di Folco (France) Pierre-Alexandre Jean (Italy) Lorenzo Patrese	Audi DAR 5.2 L V10	162	
DNF	G	10	(Belgium) Boutsen Ginion Racing	(France) Adam Eteki (France) Antoine Leclerc (Belgium) Benjamin Lessennes (Saudi Arabia) Karim Ojjeh	Audi R8 LMS Evo II	153	
DNF	G	10	(Belgium) Boutsen Ginion Racing	(France) Adam Eteki (France) Antoine Leclerc (Belgium) Benjamin Lessennes (Saudi Arabia) Karim Ojjeh	Audi DAR 5.2 L V10	153	
DNF	PA	9	(Germany) Herberth Motorsport	(Hong Kong) Antares Au (New Zealand) Jaxon Evans (Luxembourg) Dylan Pereira (Macau) Kevin Tse	Porsche 911 GT3 R (991.II)	100	
DNF	PA	9	(Germany) Herberth Motorsport	(Hong Kong) Antares Au (New Zealand) Jaxon Evans (Luxembourg) Dylan Pereira (Macau) Kevin Tse	Porsche 4.0 L Flat-6	100	
DNF	P	12	(Italy) Audi Sport Team Tresor	(Belgium) Dries Vanthoor (South Africa) Kelvin van der Linde (Belgium) Charles Weerts	Audi R8 LMS Evo II	92	
DNF	P	12	(Italy) Audi Sport Team Tresor	(Belgium) Dries Vanthoor (South Africa) Kelvin van der Linde (Belgium) Charles Weerts	Audi DAR 5.2 L V10	92	
DNF	S	777	(Oman) Al Manar Racing by HRT	(Oman) Al Faisal Al Zubair (Zimbabwe) Axcil Jefferies (Canada) Daniel Morad (Germany) Fabian Schiller	Mercedes-AMG GT3 Evo	58	
DNF	S	777	(Oman) Al Manar Racing by HRT	(Oman) Al Faisal Al Zubair (Zimbabwe) Axcil Jefferies (Canada) Daniel Morad (Germany) Fabian Schiller	Mercedes-AMG M159 6.2 L V8	58	
DNF	S	97	(United Kingdom) Beechdean AMR	(Canada) Roman De Angelis (United Kingdom) Charlie Fagg (France) Théo Nouet (United Kingdom) David Pittard	Aston Martin Vantage AMR GT3	57	
DNF	S	97	(United Kingdom) Beechdean AMR	(Canada) Roman De Angelis (United Kingdom) Charlie Fagg (France) Théo Nouet (United Kingdom) David Pittard	Aston Martin M177 4.0 L Turbo V8	57	
DNF	G	91	(Germany) Allied Racing	(Switzerland) Julien Apotheloz (Turkey) Ayhancan Güven (France) Florian Latorre; Alex Malykhin	Porsche 911 GT3 R (991.II)	57	
DNF	G	91	(Germany) Allied Racing	(Switzerland) Julien Apotheloz (Turkey) Ayhancan Güven (France) Florian Latorre; Alex Malykhin	Porsche 4.0 L Flat-6	57	
DNF	S	26	(France) Saintéloc Junior Team	(Belgium) Nicolas Baert (France) Cesar Gazeau (Belgium) Gilles Magnus (France) Aurélien Panis	Audi R8 LMS Evo II	38	
DNF	S	26	(France) Saintéloc Junior Team	(Belgium) Nicolas Baert (France) Cesar Gazeau (Belgium) Gilles Magnus (France) Aurélien Panis	Audi DAR 5.2 L V10	38	
Fastest lap: (Italy) Alessio Rovera – 2:17.480 (lap 285)

Icon	Class
**P**	Pro Cup
**S**	Silver Cup
**PA**	Pro-Am Cup
**G**	Gold Cup
**B**	Bronze Cup

Previous race: 2022 Bathurst 12 Hour	Intercontinental GT Challenge; 2022 season	Next race: 2022 Indianapolis 8 Hours
Previous race: 2022 Paul Ricard 1000km	GT World Challenge Europe Endurance Cup; 2022 season	Next race: 2022 3 Hours of Hockenheim
