= Théo Nouet =

French racing driver (born 2002)

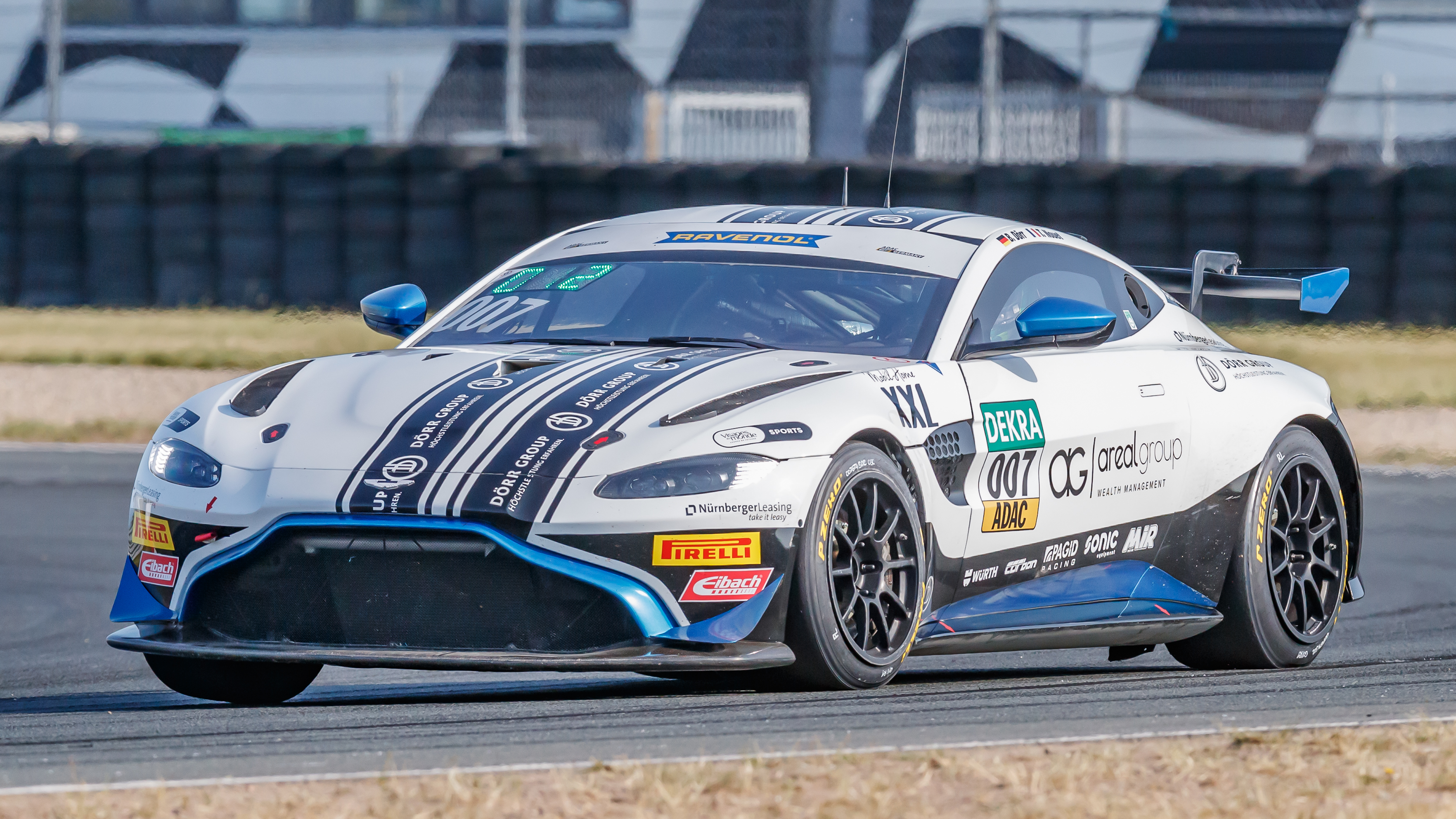
- Nouet competing in ADAC GT4 Germany in 2023
- Nationality: (France) French
- Born: 4 August 2002 (age 24) Erquy, France

ADAC GT4 Germany career
- Debut season: 2021
- Current team: Drago Racing Team zvo
- Categorisation: FIA Silver
- Starts: 18 (18 entries)
- Wins: 2
- Podiums: 7
- Poles: 2
- Fastest laps: 1
- Best finish: 2nd in 2021

Previous series
- 2020-22 2019 2018: GT4 European Series; French GT4 Cup; French F4 Championship

Théo Nouet (born 4 August 2002) is a French racing driver. He is the 2020 GT4 European Series Champion.

== Racing record ==
=== Racing career summary ===
Season	Series	Team	Races	Wins	Poles	F/Laps	Podiums	Points	Position
2018	French F4 Championship	FFSA Academy	21	1	0	0	2	66.5	11th
2019	French GT4 Cup - Pro-Am	Orhes Racing	11	0	0	0	0	18	18th
2020	GT4 European Series - Silver	AGS Events	12	4	2	0	7	184	**1st**
2020	French GT4 Cup - Silver	AGS Events	1	0	0	0	0	0	NC
2021	ADAC GT4 Germany	Team Zakspeed	12	2	2	1	7	178	**2nd**
2021	GT4 European Series - Silver	Team Zakspeed	2	1	0	0	2	0	NC†
2022	ADAC GT4 Germany	CV Performance Group	2	0	0	0	0	17	34th
2022	ADAC GT4 Germany	Drago Racing Team zvo	4	0	0	0	0	17	34th
2022	GT4 European Series - Pro-Am	Drago Racing Team zvo	4	0	0	0	2	42	11th
2022	GT World Challenge Europe Endurance Cup	Beechdean AMR	3	0	0	0	0	0	NC
2022	GT World Challenge Europe Endurance Cup - Gold	Beechdean AMR	2	0	0	1	0	4	27th
2022	Le Mans Cup - GT3	Bullitt Racing	2	0	0	1	1	30	10th
2023	ADAC GT4 Germany	Dörr Motorsport	5	0	0	0	1	29	22nd
2023	24 Hours of Nürburgring - SP10	Dörr Motorsport	1	0	1	0	0	N/A	DNF
2024	GT World Challenge Europe Endurance Cup	Dinamic GT	4	0	0	0	0	0	NC

^{†} As Nouet was a guest driver, he was ineligible to score points.* Season still in progress.

=== Complete French F4 Championship results ===
(key) (Races in bold indicate pole position) (Races in italics indicate fastest lap)

Year	1	2	3	4	5	6	7	8	9	10	11	12	13	14	15	16	17	18	19	20	21	Pos	Points
2018	NOG; 1; 19†	NOG; 2; 10	NOG; 3; 10	PAU; 1; 11	PAU; 2 Ret	PAU; 3; 10	SPA; 1; 7	SPA; 2; 14	SPA; 3; 10	DIJ; 1; 9	DIJ; 2; 1	DIJ; 3; 4	MAG; 1 Ret	MAG; 2; 10	MAG; 3; 9	JER; 1; 11	JER; 2; 11	JER; 3; 16†	LEC; 1; 9	LEC; 2; 2	LEC; 3; 4	11th	66.5

=== Complete GT4 European Series results ===
(key) (Races in bold indicate pole position) (Races in italics indicate fastest lap)

Year	Team	Car	Class	1	2	3	4	5	6	7	8	9	10	11	12	Pos	Points
2020	AGS Events	Aston Martin Vantage AMR GT4	Silver	IMO; 1; 2	IMO; 2; 6	**MIS**; **1**; 16	MIS; 2; 1	NÜR; 1; 17	NÜR; 2; 2	ZAN; 1; 2	ZAN; 2; 4	**SPA**; **1**; 1	SPA; 2; 4	LEC; 1; 5	LEC; 2 Ret	1st	184
2021	Team Zakspeed	Mercedes-AMG GT4	Silver	MNZ; 1	MNZ; 2	LEC; 1	LEC; 2	ZAN; 1	ZAN; 2	SPA; 1	SPA; 2	NÜR; 1; 1	NÜR; 2; 3	CAT; 1	CAT; 2	NC†	0
2022	Drago Racing Team ZVO	Mercedes-AMG GT4	Pro-Am	IMO; 1	IMO; 2	LEC; 1	LEC; 2	MIS; 1	MIS; 2	SPA; 1	SPA; 2	HOC; 1; 7	HOC; 2; 10	CAT; 1; 11	CAT; 2; 18	11th	42

=== Complete ADAC GT4 Germany results ===
(key) (Races in bold indicate pole position) (Races in italics indicate fastest lap)

Year	Team	Car	1	2	3	4	5	6	7	8	9	10	11	12	DC	Points
2021	Team Zakspeed	Mercedes-AMG GT4	OSC; 1; 21	**OSC**; **2** DSQ	RBR; 1; 2	RBR; 2; 2	ZAN; 1; 1	**ZAN**; **2**; 1	SAC; 1; 3	SAC; 2; 2	HOC; 1; 2	HOC; 2; 8	NÜR; 1; 9	NÜR; 2; 19	2nd	178
2022	CV Performance Group	Mercedes-AMG GT4	OSC1; 1	OSC1; 2	RBR; 1; 4	RBR; 2 Ret	ZAN; 1	ZAN; 2	NÜR; 1	NÜR; 2					34th	17
2022	Drago Racing Team zvo	Mercedes-AMG GT4									SAC; 1 Ret	SAC; 2; 12	HOC; 1; 16	HOC; 2; 22	34th	17
2023	Dörr Motorsport	Aston Martin Vantage AMR GT4	OSC; 1; 15	OSC; 2 DNS	ZAN; 1; 17	ZAN; 2; 13	NÜR; 1; 3	NÜR; 2; 7	LAU; 1	LAU; 2	SAC; 1	SAC; 2	HOC; 1	HOC; 2	22nd	29

=== Complete GT World Challenge Europe results ===
==== GT World Challenge Europe Endurance Cup ====
Year	Team	Car	Class	1	2	3	4	5	6	7	Pos.	Points
2022	Beechdean AMR	Aston Martin Vantage AMR GT3	Gold	IMO; Ret	LEC; 31						27th	4
2022	Beechdean AMR	Aston Martin Vantage AMR GT3	Silver			SPA; 6H; Ret	SPA; 12H; Ret	SPA; 24H; Ret	HOC	CAT	NC	0
2024	Dinamic GT	Porsche 911 GT3 R (992)	Silver	LEC	SPA; 6H; 21	SPA; 12H; 24	SPA; 24H; 27	NÜR; 27	MNZ; 28	JED; 26	6th	73
