= 2026 Le Mans Cup =

European racing season

The 2026 Le Mans Cup, known as the 2026 Michelin Le Mans Cup for sponsorship reasons, was the eleventh season of the Le Mans Cup. The six-event series began at Circuit de Barcelona-Catalunya on 11 April and concluded at Algarve International Circuit on 10 October. The series was open to Le Mans Prototypes in the LMP3 category and grand tourer sports cars in the GT3 class. For the first time, the flagship Road to Le Mans event featured a single, three-hour endurance race.

== Calendar ==
The provisional calendar for the 2026 season was announced on 28 August 2025. All venues from the previous season returned, with the 24 Hours of Le Mans–supporting Road to Le Mans changing format from a pair of sprint races to a single, three-hour endurance race.

Rnd	Circuit	Location	Race Length	Date
1	(Spain) Circuit de Barcelona-Catalunya	Montmeló, Spain	2 hours	11 April
2	(France) Circuit Paul Ricard	Le Castellet, France	2 hours	2 May
3	(France) Circuit de la Sarthe	Le Mans, France	3 hours	12 June
4	(Belgium) Circuit de Spa-Francorchamps	Stavelot, Belgium	2 hours	22 August
5	(United Kingdom) Silverstone Circuit	Silverstone, United Kingdom	2 hours	12 September
6	(Portugal) Algarve International Circuit	Portimão, Portugal	2 hours	10 October

== Entries ==
=== LMP3 ===
All cars in the LMP3 class use the Toyota V35A-FTS 3.5 L twin-turbo V6 engine and Michelin tyres. Entries in the LMP3 Pro-Am class, set aside for teams with a Bronze-rated driver in their line-up, are denoted with icons.

Entrant/Team	Chassis	No.	MISC	Drivers	Rounds
(Germany) Rinaldi Racing	Ligier JS P325	2	P3	(Greece) Stylianos Kolovos	3
(Germany) Rinaldi Racing	Ligier JS P325	2	P3	(Italy) Alvise Rodella	3
(Germany) Rinaldi Racing	Ligier JS P325	66	PA	(Germany) Steve Parrow	All
(Germany) Rinaldi Racing	Ligier JS P325	66	PA	(Denmark) Mikkel Gaarde Pedersen	All
(Germany) Rinaldi Racing	Ligier JS P325	71	PA	(Germany) Stefan Aust	All
(Germany) Rinaldi Racing	Ligier JS P325	71	PA	(Germany) Felipe Fernández Laser	All
(Luxembourg) DKR Engineering	Ligier JS P325	3	PA	(France) Quentin Antonel	3
(Luxembourg) DKR Engineering	Ligier JS P325	3	PA	(Estonia) Antti Rammo	3
(United Kingdom) Nielsen Racing	Duqueine D09	4	P3	(France) Jules Caranta	All
(United Kingdom) Nielsen Racing	Duqueine D09	4	P3	(South Africa) Mikaeel Pitamber	All
(United Kingdom) Nielsen Racing	Duqueine D09	7	P3	(United Kingdom) Matt Bell	1
(United Kingdom) Nielsen Racing	Duqueine D09	7	P3	(United States) Wyatt Brichacek	1
(United Kingdom) Nielsen Racing	Duqueine D09	7	P3	(United Kingdom) Alfie Briggs	3
(United Kingdom) Nielsen Racing	Duqueine D09	7	P3	(France) Gaël Julien	3
(France) 23Events Racing	Ligier JS P325	5	P3	(United Kingdom) Isaac Barashi	All
(France) 23Events Racing	Ligier JS P325	5	P3	(Italy) Matteo Franco Segre	All
(France) 23Events Racing	Ligier JS P325	50	P3	(Italy) Giovanni Maschio	All
(France) 23Events Racing	Ligier JS P325	50	P3	(United States) Colin Queen	All
(France) ANS Motorsport	Ligier JS P325	6	P3	(Spain) Mikkel Kristensen	All
(France) ANS Motorsport	Ligier JS P325	6	P3	(Brazil) Arthur Pavie	1–4, 6
(France) ANS Motorsport	Ligier JS P325	6	P3	(Australia) Jack Taylor	5
(France) ANS Motorsport	Ligier JS P325	9	P3	(United Kingdom) Maxwell Dodds	All
(France) ANS Motorsport	Ligier JS P325	9	P3	(France) Louis Iglesias	All
(Germany) BWT Mücke Motorsport	Duqueine D09	8	P3	(Poland) Maksymilian Angelard	All
(Germany) BWT Mücke Motorsport	Duqueine D09	8	P3	(Germany) Mattis Pluschkell	All
(Spain) Brutal Fish by Campos	Ligier JS P325	12	P3	(Sweden) August Raber	All
(Spain) Brutal Fish by Campos	Ligier JS P325	12	P3	(France) Arthur Rogeon	All
(Spain) Brutal Fish by Campos	Ligier JS P325	19	P3	(Spain) Lucas Fluxá	All
(Spain) Brutal Fish by Campos	Ligier JS P325	19	P3	(Slovakia) Matúš Ryba	All
(United Kingdom) Vector Sport RLR	Ligier JS P325	15	P3	(Colombia) Gerónimo Gómez Azza	All
(United Kingdom) Vector Sport RLR	Ligier JS P325	15	P3	(United Kingdom) Colin Noble	1–2
(United Kingdom) Vector Sport RLR	Ligier JS P325	15	P3	(Switzerland) Enea Frey	3–6
(India) Ajith RedAnt by Virage	Ligier JS P325	16	PA	(India) Ajith Kumar	All
(India) Ajith RedAnt by Virage	Ligier JS P325	16	PA	(France) Romain Vozniak	All
(Poland) Team Virage	Ligier JS P325	28	PA	(United Kingdom) Theo Micouris	3
(Poland) Team Virage	Ligier JS P325	28	PA	(Hong Kong) Denise Yeung	3
(Poland) Team Virage	Ligier JS P325	70	P3	(United Kingdom) Jude Peters	All
(Poland) Team Virage	Ligier JS P325	70	P3	(Belgium) Vic Stevens	All
(Belgium) Ajith RedAnt Racing	Ligier JS P325	36	P3	(India) Narain Karthikeyan	All
(Belgium) Ajith RedAnt Racing	Ligier JS P325	36	P3	(India) Aditya Patel	All
(Denmark) High Class Racing	Ligier JS P325	20	P3	(Denmark) Philip Lindberg	All
(Denmark) High Class Racing	Ligier JS P325	20	P3	(Germany) Lenny Ried	All
(Denmark) High Class Racing	Ligier JS P325	49	PA	(Denmark) Michael Hove Jacobsen	All
(Denmark) High Class Racing	Ligier JS P325	49	PA	(South Africa) Andrew Rackstraw	All
(Denmark) High Class Racing	Ligier JS P325	94	P3	(France) Gaël Julien	6
(Denmark) High Class Racing	Ligier JS P325	94	P3	(Greece) Stylianos Kolovos	6
(France) Trajectus Motorsport	Ligier JS P325	22	P3	(Portugal) André Vieira	All
(France) Trajectus Motorsport	Ligier JS P325	22	P3	(France) Mathis Poulet	1–4
(France) Trajectus Motorsport	Ligier JS P325	22	P3	(France) Jules Tréluyer	5
(France) Trajectus Motorsport	Ligier JS P325	22	P3	(France) Vincent Bouteiller	6
(France) Racing Spirit of Léman	Ligier JS P325	24	PA	(Germany) Christian Gisy	All
(France) Racing Spirit of Léman	Ligier JS P325	24	PA	(Denmark) Oskar Kristensen	All
(Czech Republic) Bretton Racing	Ligier JS P325	26	P3	(United Kingdom) Kristian Brookes	1
(Czech Republic) Bretton Racing	Ligier JS P325	26	P3	(United Kingdom) Ewan Thomas	1
(Czech Republic) Bretton Racing	Ligier JS P325	26	P3	(France) Augustin Bernier	3
(Czech Republic) Bretton Racing	Ligier JS P325	26	P3	(Australia) James Winslow	3
(Czech Republic) Bretton Racing	Ligier JS P325	26	P3	(Brazil) Bruno Ribeiro	4–6
(Czech Republic) Bretton Racing	Ligier JS P325	26	P3	(Netherlands) Mitchell van Dijk	4–5
(Czech Republic) Bretton Racing	Ligier JS P325	26	P3	(United Kingdom) Emily Cotty	6
(Czech Republic) Bretton Racing	Ligier JS P325	62	PA	(Algeria) Leo Robinson	All
(Czech Republic) Bretton Racing	Ligier JS P325	62	PA	(Poland) Jacek Zielonka	All
(United Kingdom) P4 Racing	Ligier JS P325	27	PA	(United Kingdom) Andrew Ferguson	1–2, 4–6
(United Kingdom) P4 Racing	Ligier JS P325	27	PA	(United Kingdom) Louis Hamilton-Smith	1–2, 4–6
(France) Forestier Racing by VPS	Ligier JS P325	29	P3	(United States) Roee Meyuhas	All
(France) Forestier Racing by VPS	Ligier JS P325	29	P3	(France) Luciano Morano	All
(France) Forestier Racing by VPS	Ligier JS P325	92	P3	(Denmark) Sebastian Bach	All
(France) Forestier Racing by VPS	Ligier JS P325	92	P3	(Brazil) Lucas Fecury	All
(Poland) Inter Europol Competition	Ligier JS P325	34	PA	(United Arab Emirates) Alexander Bukhantsov (Note: Bukhantsov is Russian, but he competed under an Emirati licence at rounds All as Russian national emblems were banned by the FIA following the Russian invasion of Ukraine. The ban was lifted on 13 August 2026.)	All
(Poland) Inter Europol Competition	Ligier JS P325	34	PA	(United States) Shawn Rashid	1–3
(Poland) Inter Europol Competition	Ligier JS P325	34	PA	(United Kingdom) George King	4
(Poland) Inter Europol Competition	Ligier JS P325	34	PA	(Australia) James Winslow	5
(Poland) Inter Europol Competition	Ligier JS P325	34	PA	(Denmark) Christian Dannemand Jørgensen	6
(Poland) Inter Europol Competition	Ligier JS P325	43	P3	(Denmark) Christian Dannemand Jørgensen	1–5
(Poland) Inter Europol Competition	Ligier JS P325	43	P3	(Sweden) William Karlsson	1–3
(Poland) Inter Europol Competition	Ligier JS P325	43	P3	(Canada) Jonathan Woolridge	4
(Poland) Inter Europol Competition	Ligier JS P325	43	P3	(United Kingdom) Callum Voisin	5
(France) Ultimate	Ligier JS P325	35	PA	(France) Arlan Boulain	3
(France) Ultimate	Ligier JS P325	35	PA	(France) Gilles Hériau	3
(Switzerland) CLX Motorsport	Ligier JS P325	37	PA	(Brazil) Bruno Ribeiro	3
(Switzerland) CLX Motorsport	Ligier JS P325	37	PA	(France) Louis Stern	3
(Switzerland) CLX Motorsport	Ligier JS P325	87	P3	(Brazil) Alexander Jacoby	All
(Switzerland) CLX Motorsport	Ligier JS P325	87	P3	(Switzerland) Kévin Rabin	All
(Switzerland) CLX Motorsport	Ligier JS P325	97	P3	(Switzerland) David Droux	All
(Switzerland) CLX Motorsport	Ligier JS P325	97	P3	(Switzerland) Cédric Oltramare	1–3
(Switzerland) CLX Motorsport	Ligier JS P325	97	P3	(France) Romain Boeckler	4
(Switzerland) CLX Motorsport	Ligier JS P325	97	P3	(Belgium) Beau Lowette	5–6
(United Kingdom) Steller Motorsport	Duqueine D09	42	PA	(Zimbabwe) Ameerh Naran	3
(United Kingdom) Steller Motorsport	Duqueine D09	42	PA	(Brazil) Sérgio Sette Câmara	3
(Sweden) Allay Racing	Ligier JS P325	48	PA	(Sweden) Emil Hellberg	4–6
(Sweden) Allay Racing	Ligier JS P325	48	PA	(Sweden) Linus Hellberg	4–6
(Australia) GG Classics	Ligier JS P325	58	PA	(Australia) Fraser Ross	All
(Australia) GG Classics	Ligier JS P325	58	PA	(Australia) George Nakas	1, 3–6
(Australia) GG Classics	Ligier JS P325	58	PA	(United Kingdom) James Sweetnam	2
(France) M Racing	Ligier JS P325	68	P3	(United Kingdom) Haydn Chance	All
(France) M Racing	Ligier JS P325	68	P3	(Argentina) Nano López	All
(France) M Racing	Ligier JS P325	78	PA	(United Kingdom) Wayne Boyd	3
(France) M Racing	Ligier JS P325	78	PA	(United States) Dan Goldburg	3
(France) R-ace GP	Duqueine D09	85	P3	(Singapore) Danial Frost	All
(France) R-ace GP	Duqueine D09	85	P3	(France) Enzo Peugeot	All
(France) R-ace GP	Duqueine D09	86	P3	(Switzerland) Léna Bühler	All
(France) R-ace GP	Duqueine D09	86	P3	(New Zealand) Zack Scoular	All
(Belgium) Motorsport98	Ligier JS P325	98	PA	(Belgium) Eric De Doncker	All
(Belgium) Motorsport98	Ligier JS P325	98	PA	(France) Gillian Henrion	All
(Netherlands) More Motorsport	Ligier JS P325	99	P3	(Netherlands) Max van der Snel	All
(Netherlands) More Motorsport	Ligier JS P325	99	P3	(Netherlands) Tim Gerhards	1–5
(Netherlands) More Motorsport	Ligier JS P325	99	P3	(Canada) Pearce Wade	6

Icon	MISC
P3	LMP3
PA	LMP3 Pro-Am

- Hadrien David, Luke Kendall and Natan Bihel were scheduled to compete for Nielsen Racing, Vector Sport RLR and M Racing respectively, but were replaced prior to the start of the season.
- Dan Skočdopole and Josh Hill were scheduled to compete for Bretton Racing and Steller Motorsport respectively, but did not appear at any rounds.
- Leo Robinson was scheduled to compete for Team Virage, but switched to Bretton Racing prior to the start of the season.

=== GT3 ===
Entrant/Team	Chassis	Engine	No.	Drivers	Rounds
(France) Racing Spirit of Léman	Aston Martin Vantage AMR GT3 Evo	Aston Martin M177 4.0 L Turbo V8	10	(Austria) Philipp Sager	All
(France) Racing Spirit of Léman	Aston Martin Vantage AMR GT3 Evo	Aston Martin M177 4.0 L Turbo V8	10	(France) Valentin Hasse-Clot	1–3, 5–6
(France) Racing Spirit of Léman	Aston Martin Vantage AMR GT3 Evo	Aston Martin M177 4.0 L Turbo V8	10	(France) Marius Fossard	4
(France) Code Racing Development	Aston Martin Vantage AMR GT3 Evo	Aston Martin M177 4.0 L Turbo V8	11	(Colombia) Sebastián Moreno	1–3
(France) Code Racing Development	Aston Martin Vantage AMR GT3 Evo	Aston Martin M177 4.0 L Turbo V8	11	(Germany) Nico Hantke	1
(France) Code Racing Development	Aston Martin Vantage AMR GT3 Evo	Aston Martin M177 4.0 L Turbo V8	11	(Switzerland) Ethan Ischer	2–3
(France) Code Racing Development	Aston Martin Vantage AMR GT3 Evo	Aston Martin M177 4.0 L Turbo V8	11	(France) Viny Beltramelli	4
(France) Code Racing Development	Aston Martin Vantage AMR GT3 Evo	Aston Martin M177 4.0 L Turbo V8	11	(France) Pascal Huteau	4
(France) Code Racing Development	Aston Martin Vantage AMR GT3 Evo	Aston Martin M177 4.0 L Turbo V8	11	(United Kingdom) George King	5
(France) Code Racing Development	Aston Martin Vantage AMR GT3 Evo	Aston Martin M177 4.0 L Turbo V8	11	(Belgium) Stéphane Lémeret	5
(France) Code Racing Development	Aston Martin Vantage AMR GT3 Evo	Aston Martin M177 4.0 L Turbo V8	11	(France) Antoine Comeau	6
(France) Code Racing Development	Aston Martin Vantage AMR GT3 Evo	Aston Martin M177 4.0 L Turbo V8	11	(United States) Nicky Hays	6
(Germany) GetSpeed	Mercedes-AMG GT3 Evo	Mercedes-AMG M159 6.2 L V8	14	(United States) Anthony Bartone	3
(Germany) GetSpeed	Mercedes-AMG GT3 Evo	Mercedes-AMG M159 6.2 L V8	14	(Luxembourg) Steve Jans	3
(Germany) GetSpeed	Mercedes-AMG GT3 Evo	Mercedes-AMG M159 6.2 L V8	96	(France) Patrick Charlaix	3
(Germany) GetSpeed	Mercedes-AMG GT3 Evo	Mercedes-AMG M159 6.2 L V8	96	(France) Marvin Klein	3
(Switzerland) Kessel Racing	Ferrari 296 GT3 Evo	Ferrari F163CE 3.0 L Turbo V6	17	(Italy) David Fumanelli	All
(Switzerland) Kessel Racing	Ferrari 296 GT3 Evo	Ferrari F163CE 3.0 L Turbo V6	17	(Italy) Lorenzo Innocenti	All
(Switzerland) Kessel Racing	Ferrari 296 GT3 Evo	Ferrari F163CE 3.0 L Turbo V6	21	(United Kingdom) Oscar Ryndziewicz	All
(Switzerland) Kessel Racing	Ferrari 296 GT3 Evo	Ferrari F163CE 3.0 L Turbo V6	21	(Italy) Giacomo Altoè	1, 3, 5–6
(Switzerland) Kessel Racing	Ferrari 296 GT3 Evo	Ferrari F163CE 3.0 L Turbo V6	21	(Italy) Lorenzo Ferrari	2, 4
(Spain) Biogas Motorsport	Ferrari 296 GT3 1–2; Ferrari 296 GT3 Evo 3–6	Ferrari F163CE 3.0 L Turbo V6	23	(Spain) Josep Mayola	All
(Spain) Biogas Motorsport	Ferrari 296 GT3 1–2; Ferrari 296 GT3 Evo 3–6	Ferrari F163CE 3.0 L Turbo V6	23	(Spain) Marc Carol	1–2, 4–6
(Spain) Biogas Motorsport	Ferrari 296 GT3 1–2; Ferrari 296 GT3 Evo 3–6	Ferrari F163CE 3.0 L Turbo V6	23	(Spain) Fran Rueda	3
(Denmark) High Class Racing	Porsche 911 GT3 R (992.2)	Porsche M97/80 4.2 L Flat-6	45	(Germany) Max Moritz	3
(Denmark) High Class Racing	Porsche 911 GT3 R (992.2)	Porsche M97/80 4.2 L Flat-6	45	(Netherlands) Morris Schuring	3
(Italy) AF Corse	Ferrari 296 GT3 Evo	Ferrari F163CE 3.0 L Turbo V6	51	(Italy) Alessandro Cozzi	All
(Italy) AF Corse	Ferrari 296 GT3 Evo	Ferrari F163CE 3.0 L Turbo V6	51	(Italy) Eliseo Donno	All
(Italy) AF Corse	Ferrari 296 GT3 Evo	Ferrari F163CE 3.0 L Turbo V6	55	(Italy) Tommaso Mosca	3
(Italy) AF Corse	Ferrari 296 GT3 Evo	Ferrari F163CE 3.0 L Turbo V6	55	(Puerto Rico) Francesco Piovanetti	3
(Italy) AF Corse	Ferrari 296 GT3 Evo	Ferrari F163CE 3.0 L Turbo V6	83	(United Kingdom) Charlie Fagg	3
(Italy) AF Corse	Ferrari 296 GT3 Evo	Ferrari F163CE 3.0 L Turbo V6	83	(Japan) Norikazu Shibata	3
(Italy) AF Corse	Ferrari 296 GT3 Evo	Ferrari F163CE 3.0 L Turbo V6	88	(United States) Rey Acosta III	All
(Italy) AF Corse	Ferrari 296 GT3 Evo	Ferrari F163CE 3.0 L Turbo V6	88	(Italy) Marco Bonanomi	All
(Italy) Dinamic GT	Porsche 911 GT3 R (992.2)	Porsche M97/80 4.2 L Flat-6	54	(Italy) Matteo Cressoni	All
(Italy) Dinamic GT	Porsche 911 GT3 R (992.2)	Porsche M97/80 4.2 L Flat-6	54	(Canada) Reinhold Krahn	All
(Belgium) Team WRT	BMW M4 GT3 Evo	BMW P58 3.0 L Turbo I6	72	(France) Arnold Robin	3
(Belgium) Team WRT	BMW M4 GT3 Evo	BMW P58 3.0 L Turbo I6	72	(France) Maxime Robin	3
(Spain) SMC Motorsport	McLaren 720S GT3 Evo	McLaren M840T 4.0 L Turbo V8	77	(Spain) Gonzalo de Andrés	All
(Spain) SMC Motorsport	McLaren 720S GT3 Evo	McLaren M840T 4.0 L Turbo V8	77	(France) Jean-Baptiste Simmenauer	All
(United Kingdom) Ecurie Ecosse Blackthorn	Aston Martin Vantage AMR GT3 Evo	Aston Martin M177 4.0 L Turbo V8	90	(United Kingdom) Charles Bateman	3
(United Kingdom) Ecurie Ecosse Blackthorn	Aston Martin Vantage AMR GT3 Evo	Aston Martin M177 4.0 L Turbo V8	90	(Belgium) Kobe Pauwels	3
(United Kingdom) Ecurie Ecosse Blackthorn	Aston Martin Vantage AMR GT3 Evo	Aston Martin M177 4.0 L Turbo V8	91	(Switzerland) Claude Bovet	1–2, 4–6
(United Kingdom) Ecurie Ecosse Blackthorn	Aston Martin Vantage AMR GT3 Evo	Aston Martin M177 4.0 L Turbo V8	91	(United Kingdom) Tom Canning	1–2, 4–6
(United Kingdom) Ecurie Ecosse Blackthorn	Aston Martin Vantage AMR GT3 Evo	Aston Martin M177 4.0 L Turbo V8	91	(France) Romain Leroux	3
(United Kingdom) Ecurie Ecosse Blackthorn	Aston Martin Vantage AMR GT3 Evo	Aston Martin M177 4.0 L Turbo V8	91	(Italy) Giacomo Petrobelli	3
(United Kingdom) United Autosports	McLaren 720S GT3 Evo	McLaren M840T 4.0 L Turbo V8	95	(United Kingdom) Michael Birch	3
(United Kingdom) United Autosports	McLaren 720S GT3 Evo	McLaren M840T 4.0 L Turbo V8	95	(Australia) Garnet Patterson	3

- Tom Wood and Loek Hartog were scheduled to compete for Racing Spirit of Léman and Dinamic GT respectively, but were replaced prior to the start of the season.
- Pascal Huteau and Antoine Leclerc were scheduled to share Code Racing Development's Aston Martin, but the team reshuffled its lineup prior to the start of the season. Huteau then featured at Spa-Francorchamps.
- Jens Reno Møller provisionally entered Road to Le Mans for High Class Racing, but was later replaced by Max Moritz.

== Race results ==
Bold indicates the overall winner.

Round	Circuit	LMP3 Winners	LMP3 Pro-Am Winners	GT3 Winners
1	(Spain) Catalunya	**(France) No. 85 R-ace GP**	(Czech Republic) No. 62 Bretton Racing	(France) No. 10 Racing Spirit of Léman
1	(Spain) Catalunya	**(Singapore) Danial Frost** **(France) Enzo Peugeot**	(Algeria) Leo Robinson (Poland) Jacek Zielonka	(France) Valentin Hasse-Clot (Austria) Philipp Sager
2	(France) Le Castellet	**(France) No. 50 23Events Racing**	(Belgium) No. 98 Motorsport98	(Switzerland) No. 17 Kessel Racing
2	(France) Le Castellet	**(Italy) Giovanni Maschio** **(United States) Colin Queen**	(Belgium) Eric De Doncker (France) Gillian Henrion	(Italy) David Fumanelli (Italy) Lorenzo Innocenti
3	(France) Le Mans	**(Spain) No. 12 Brutal Fish by Campos**	(Belgium) No. 98 Motorsport98	(France) No. 10 Racing Spirit of Léman
3	(France) Le Mans	**(Sweden) August Raber** **(France) Arthur Rogeon**	(Belgium) Eric De Doncker (France) Gillian Henrion	(France) Valentin Hasse-Clot (Austria) Philipp Sager
4	(Belgium) Spa-Francorchamps	**(France) No. 85 R-ace GP**	(Belgium) No. 98 Motorsport98	(Switzerland) No. 21 Kessel Racing
4	(Belgium) Spa-Francorchamps	**(Singapore) Danial Frost** **(France) Enzo Peugeot**	(Belgium) Eric De Doncker (France) Gillian Henrion	(Italy) Lorenzo Ferrari (United Kingdom) Oscar Ryndziewicz
5	(United Kingdom) Silverstone	**(France) No. 9 ANS Motorsport** (Note: The LMP3 class was originally won by the No. 85 R-ace GP entry of Danial Frost and Enzo Peugeot, but they were subsequently issued with a ten-second time penalty for a Full Course Yellow infringement. As a result, the No. 9 ANS Motorsport car inherited the win.)	(Germany) No. 66 Rinaldi Racing	(Switzerland) No. 17 Kessel Racing
5	(United Kingdom) Silverstone	**(United Kingdom) Maxwell Dodds** **(France) Louis Iglesias**	(Germany) Steve Parrow (Denmark) Mikkel Gaarde Pedersen	(Italy) David Fumanelli (Italy) Lorenzo Innocenti
6	(Portugal) Portimão	**(France) No. 85 R-ace GP**	(Germany) No. 71 Rinaldi Racing	(Switzerland) No. 17 Kessel Racing
6	(Portugal) Portimão	**(Singapore) Danial Frost** **(France) Enzo Peugeot**	(Germany) Stefan Aust (Germany) Felipe Fernandez Laser	(Italy) David Fumanelli (Italy) Lorenzo Innocenti

== Championship standings ==
Points are awarded according to the following structure:

Position	1st	2nd	3rd	4th	5th	6th	7th	8th	9th	10th	Pole
Points	25	18	15	12	10	8	6	4	2	1	1
Le Mans	38	27	23	18	15	12	9	6	3	2	1

=== LMP3 Drivers' Championship ===
Pos.	Driver	Team	BAR (Spain)	LEC (France)	LMS (France)	SPA (Belgium)	SIL (United Kingdom)	POR (Portugal)	Points
1	(Singapore) Danial Frost (France) Enzo Peugeot	(France) R-ace GP	**1**	2	4	1	**2**	1	131
2	(Sweden) August Raber (France) Arthur Rogeon	(Spain) Brutal Fish by Campos	Ret	Ret	**1**	2	5	2	85
3	(Spain) Lucas Fluxá (Slovakia) Matúš Ryba	(Spain) Brutal Fish by Campos	4	3	3	Ret	4	3	77
4	(United Kingdom) Maxwell Dodds (France) Louis Iglesias	(France) ANS Motorsport	19	**4**	10	**3**	1	**11**	57
5	(Italy) Giovanni Maschio (United States) Colin Queen	(France) 23Events Racing	2	1	Ret	9	11	Ret	45
6	(Denmark) Sebastian Bach (Brazil) Lucas Fecury	(France) Forestier Racing by VPS	8	5	7	4	13	5	45
7	(Denmark) Philip Lindberg (Germany) Lenny Ried	(Denmark) High Class Racing	Ret	15	2	8	19	Ret	31
8	(United States) Roee Meyuhas (France) Luciano Morano	(France) Forestier Racing by VPS	5	8	Ret	6	6	15	30
9	(United Kingdom) Jude Peters (Belgium) Vic Stevens	(Poland) Team Virage	6	12	15	Ret	3	8	27
10	(France) Jules Caranta (South Africa) Mikaeel Pitamber	(United Kingdom) Nielsen Racing	18	9	5	5	14	Ret	27
11	(Netherlands) Max van der Snel	(Netherlands) More Motorsport	7	6	Ret	7	Ret	7	26
12	(Netherlands) Tim Gerhards	(Netherlands) More Motorsport	7	6	Ret	7	Ret		20
13	(Switzerland) Léna Bühler (New Zealand) Zack Scoular	(France) R-ace GP	3	Ret	13	14	8	17	19
14	(United Kingdom) Isaac Barashi (Italy) Matteo Franco Segre	(France) 23Events Racing	11	10	9	Ret	Ret	4	16
15	(Poland) Maksymilian Angelard (Germany) Mattis Pluschkell	(Germany) BWT Mücke Motorsport	10	Ret	6	13	18	16	13
16	(Spain) Mikkel Kristensen	(France) ANS Motorsport	15	13	Ret	19	12	6	8
17	(Brazil) Arthur Pavie	(France) ANS Motorsport	15	13	Ret	19		6	8
18	(Denmark) Christian Dannemand Jørgensen	(Poland) Inter Europol Competition	12	Ret	16	16	7		6
19	(Colombia) Gerónimo Gómez Azza	(United Kingdom) Vector Sport RLR	21	7	Ret	15	15	Ret	6
20	(United Kingdom) Colin Noble	(United Kingdom) Vector Sport RLR	21	7					6
21	(United Kingdom) Callum Voisin	(Poland) Inter Europol Competition					7		6
22	(Canada) Pearce Wade	(Netherlands) More Motorsport						7	6
23	(Portugal) André Vieira	(France) Trajectus Motorsport	14	17	8	12	20	13	6
24	(France) Mathis Poulet	(France) Trajectus Motorsport	14	17	8	12			6
25	(Switzerland) David Droux	(Switzerland) CLX Motorsport	9	16	Ret	Ret	9	Ret	4
26	(Brazil) Alexander Jacoby (Switzerland) Kévin Rabin	(Switzerland) CLX Motorsport	Ret	Ret	Ret	11	10	9	3
27	(Switzerland) Cédric Oltramare	(Switzerland) CLX Motorsport	9	16	Ret				2
28	(Belgium) Beau Lowette	(Switzerland) CLX Motorsport					9	Ret	2
29	(United Kingdom) Haydn Chance (Argentina) Nano López	(France) M Racing	16	11	Ret	10	16	18	1
30	(Brazil) Bruno Ribeiro	(Czech Republic) Bretton Racing				17	17	10	1
31	(United Kingdom) Emily Cotty	(Czech Republic) Bretton Racing						10	1
32	(France) Gaël Julien	(United Kingdom) Nielsen Racing			11				0
32	(France) Gaël Julien	(Denmark) High Class Racing						14	0
33	(United Kingdom) Alfie Briggs	(United Kingdom) Nielsen Racing			11				0
34	(India) Narain Karthikeyan (India) Aditya Patel	(Belgium) Ajith Redant Racing	17	14	12	18	Ret	12	0
35	(Sweden) William Karlsson	(Poland) Inter Europol Competition	12	Ret	16				0
36	(Australia) Jack Taylor	(France) ANS Motorsport					12		0
37	(United Kingdom) Matt Bell (United States) Wyatt Brichacek	(United Kingdom) Nielsen Racing	13						0
38	(France) Vincent Bouteiller	(France) Trajectus Motorsport						13	0
39	(Switzerland) Enea Frey	(United Kingdom) Vector Sport RLR			Ret	15	15	Ret	0
40	(Canada) Jonathan Woolridge	(Poland) Inter Europol Competition				16			0
41	(Netherlands) Mitchell van Dijk	(Czech Republic) Bretton Racing				17	17		0
42	(France) Augustin Bernier (Australia) James Winslow	(Czech Republic) Bretton Racing			17				0
43	(United Kingdom) Kristian Brookes (United Kingdom) Ewan Thomas	(Czech Republic) Bretton Racing	20						0
44	(France) Jules Tréluyer	(France) Trajectus Motorsport					20		0
45	(France) Romain Boeckler	(Switzerland) CLX Motorsport				Ret			0
Drivers ineligible to score points
	(Greece) Stylianos Kolovos	(Germany) Rinaldi Racing			14				
	(Greece) Stylianos Kolovos	(Denmark) High Class Racing						14	
	(Italy) Alvise Rodella	(Germany) Rinaldi Racing			14				
Pos.	Driver	Team	BAR (Spain)	LEC (France)	LMS (France)	SPA (Belgium)	SIL (United Kingdom)	POR (Portugal)	Points

Key
Colour	Result
Gold	Race winner
Silver	2nd place
Bronze	3rd place
Green	Points finish
Blue	Non-points finish
Blue	Non-classified finish (NC)
Purple	Did not finish (Ret)
Black	Disqualified (DSQ)
Black	Excluded (EX)
White	Did not start (DNS)
White	Race cancelled (C)
White	Withdrew (WD)
Blank	Did not participate

**Bold** – Pole

Italics – Fastest Lap

=== LMP3 Teams' Championship ===
Pos.	Team	Car	BAR (Spain)	LEC (France)	LMS (France)	SPA (Belgium)	SIL (United Kingdom)	POR (Portugal)	Points
1	(France) #85 R-ace GP	Duqueine D09	**1**	2	4	1	**2**	1	131
2	(Spain) #12 Brutal Fish by Campos	Ligier JS P325	Ret	Ret	**1**	2	5	2	85
3	(Spain) #19 Brutal Fish by Campos	Ligier JS P325	4	3	3	Ret	4	3	77
4	(France) #9 ANS Motorsport	Ligier JS P325	19	**4**	10	**3**	1	**11**	57
5	(France) #50 23Events Racing	Ligier JS P325	2	1	Ret	9	11	Ret	45
6	(France) #92 Forestier Racing by VPS	Ligier JS P325	8	5	7	4	13	5	45
7	(Denmark) #20 High Class Racing	Ligier JS P325	Ret	15	2	8	19	Ret	31
8	(France) #29 Forestier Racing by VPS	Ligier JS P325	5	8	Ret	6	6	15	30
9	(Poland) #70 Team Virage	Ligier JS P325	6	12	15	Ret	3	8	27
10	(United Kingdom) #4 Nielsen Racing	Duqueine D09	18	9	5	5	14	Ret	27
11	(Netherlands) #99 More Motorsport	Ligier JS P325	7	6	Ret	7	Ret	7	26
12	(France) #86 R-ace GP	Duqueine D09	3	Ret	13	14	8	17	19
13	(France) #5 23Events Racing	Ligier JS P325	11	10	9	Ret	Ret	4	16
14	(Germany) #8 BWT Mücke Motorsport	Duqueine D09	10	Ret	6	13	18	16	13
15	(France) #6 ANS Motorsport	Ligier JS P325	15	13	Ret	19	12	6	8
16	(Poland) #43 Inter Europol Competition	Ligier JS P325	12	Ret	16	16	7	12	6
17	(United Kingdom) #15 Vector Sport RLR	Ligier JS P325	21	7	Ret	15	15	Ret	6
18	(France) #22 Trajectus Motorsport	Ligier JS P325	14	17	8	12	20	13	6
19	(Switzerland) #97 CLX Motorsport	Ligier JS P325	9	16	Ret	Ret	9	Ret	4
20	(Switzerland) #87 CLX Motorsport	Ligier JS P325	Ret	Ret	Ret	11	10	9	3
21	(France) #68 M Racing	Ligier JS P325	16	11	Ret	10	16	18	1
22	(Czech Republic) #26 Bretton Racing	Ligier JS P325	20		17	17	17	10	1
23	(United Kingdom) #7 Nielsen Racing	Duqueine D09	13		11				0
24	(Belgium) #36 Ajith Redant Racing	Ligier JS P325	17	14	12	18	Ret	12	0
Teams ineligible to score points
	(Germany) #2 Rinaldi Racing	Ligier JS P325			14				
	(Denmark) #94 High Class Racing	Ligier JS P325						14	
Pos.	Team	Car	BAR (Spain)	LEC (France)	LMS (France)	SPA (Belgium)	SIL (United Kingdom)	POR (Portugal)	Points

=== LMP3 Pro-Am Drivers' Championship ===
Pos.	Driver	Team	BAR (Spain)	LEC (France)	LMS (France)	SPA (Belgium)	SIL (United Kingdom)	POR (Portugal)	Points
1	(Belgium) Eric De Doncker (France) Gillian Henrion	(Belgium) Motorsport98	6	1	**1**	1	4	4	121
2	(Germany) Steve Parrow (Denmark) Mikkel Gaarde Pedersen	(Germany) Rinaldi Racing	2	3	3	5	1	2	113
3	(Germany) Stefan Aust (Germany) Felipe Fernández Laser	(Germany) Rinaldi Racing	4	Ret	6	2	2	1	91
4	(Algeria) Leo Robinson (Poland) Jacek Zielonka	(Czech Republic) Bretton Racing	1	2	10	4	6	5	82
5	(United Arab Emirates) Alexander Bukhantsov	(Poland) Inter Europol Competition	**5**	**4**	DSQ	**3**	**7**	**3**	63
6	(Australia) Fraser Ross	(Australia) GG Classics	8	5	5	8	3	10	58
7	(Australia) George Nakas	(Australia) GG Classics	8		5	8	3	10	48
8	(Germany) Christian Gisy (Denmark) Oskar Kristensen	(France) Racing Spirit of Léman	3	6	Ret	7	9	6	41
9	(Denmark) Michael Hove Jacobsen (South Africa) Andrew Rackstraw	(Denmark) High Class Racing	Ret	7	7	6	Ret	7	35
10	(United States) Shawn Rashid	(Poland) Inter Europol Competition	**5**	**4**	DSQ				24
11	(India) Ajith Kumar (France) Romain Vozniak	(India) Ajith RedAnt by Virage	9	9	9	Ret	10	9	22
12	(United Kingdom) Andrew Ferguson (United Kingdom) Louis Hamilton-Smith	(United Kingdom) P4 Racing	7	8		Ret	5	11	21
13	(United Kingdom) George King	(Poland) Inter Europol Competition				**3**			16
14	(Denmark) Christian Dannemand Jørgensen	(Poland) Inter Europol Competition						**3**	16
15	(United Kingdom) James Sweetnam	(Australia) GG Classics		5					10
16	(Australia) James Winslow	(Poland) Inter Europol Competition					**7**		7
Drivers ineligible to score points
	(France) Quentin Antonel (Estonia) Antti Rammo	(Luxembourg) DKR Engineering			2				
	(France) Arlan Boulan (France) Gilles Hériau	(France) Ultimate			4				
	(Sweden) Emil Hellberg (Sweden) Linus Hellberg	(Sweden) Allay Racing				9	8	8	
	(Zimbabwe) Ameer Naran (Brazil) Sérgio Sette Câmara	(United Kingdom) Steller Motorsport			8				
	(Brazil) Bruno Ribeiro (France) Louis Stern	(Switzerland) CLX Motorsport			Ret				
	(United Kingdom) Wayne Boyd (United States) Dan Goldburg	(France) M Racing			DSQ				
Pos.	Driver	Team	BAR (Spain)	LEC (France)	LMS (France)	SPA (Belgium)	SIL (United Kingdom)	POR (Portugal)	Points

Key
Colour	Result
Gold	Race winner
Silver	2nd place
Bronze	3rd place
Green	Points finish
Blue	Non-points finish
Blue	Non-classified finish (NC)
Purple	Did not finish (Ret)
Black	Disqualified (DSQ)
Black	Excluded (EX)
White	Did not start (DNS)
White	Race cancelled (C)
White	Withdrew (WD)
Blank	Did not participate

**Bold** – Pole

Italics – Fastest Lap

=== LMP3 Pro-Am Teams' Championship ===
Pos.	Team	Car	BAR (Spain)	LEC (France)	LMS (France)	SPA (Belgium)	SIL (United Kingdom)	POR (Portugal)	Points
1	(Belgium) #98 Motorsport98	Ligier JS P325	6	1	**1**	1	4	4	121
2	(Germany) #66 Rinaldi Racing	Ligier JS P325	2	3	3	5	1	2	113
3	(Germany) #71 Rinaldi Racing	Ligier JS P325	4	Ret	6	2	2	1	91
4	(Czech Republic) #62 Bretton Racing	Ligier JS P325	1	2	10	4	6	5	82
5	(Poland) #34 Inter Europol Competition	Ligier JS P325	**5**	**4**	DSQ	**3**	**7**	**3**	63
6	(Australia) #58 GG Classics	Ligier JS P325	8	5	5	8	3	10	58
7	(France) #24 Racing Spirit of Léman	Ligier JS P325	3	6	Ret	7	9	6	41
8	(Denmark) #49 High Class Racing	Ligier JS P325	Ret	7	7	6	Ret	7	35
9	(India) #16 Ajith RedAnt by Virage	Ligier JS P325	9	9	9	Ret	10	9	22
10	(United Kingdom) #27 P4 Racing	Ligier JS P325	7	8		Ret	5	11	21
Teams ineligible to score points
	(Luxembourg) #3 DKR Engineering	Ligier JS P325			2				
	(France) #35 Ultimate	Ligier JS P325			4				
	(Sweden) #48 Allay Racing	Ligier JS P325				9	8	8	
	(United Kingdom) #42 Steller Motorsport	Ligier JS P325			8				
	(Switzerland) #37 CLX Motorsport	Ligier JS P325			Ret				
	(France) #78 M Racing	Ligier JS P325			DSQ				
Pos.	Team	Car	BAR (Spain)	LEC (France)	LMS (France)	SPA (Belgium)	SIL (United Kingdom)	POR (Portugal)	Points

=== GT3 Drivers' Championship ===
Pos.	Driver	Team	BAR (Spain)	LEC (France)	LMS (France)	SPA (Belgium)	SIL (United Kingdom)	POR (Portugal)	Points
1	(Austria) Philipp Sager	(France) Racing Spirit of Léman	1	3	1	4	9	6	100
2	(United Kingdom) Oscar Ryndziewicz	(Switzerland) Kessel Racing	6	4	4	**1**	2	5	97
3	(Italy) David Fumanelli (Italy) Lorenzo Innocenti	(Switzerland) Kessel Racing	Ret	1	Ret	2	1	1	93
4	(France) Valentin Hasse-Clot	(France) Racing Spirit of Léman	1	3	1		9	6	88
5	(Italy) Matteo Cressoni (Canada) Reinhold Krahn	(Italy) Dinamic GT	2	7	3	7	3	8	76
6	(Italy) Alessandro Cozzi (Italy) Eliseo Donno	(Italy) AF Corse	5	2	7	Ret	5	4	62
7	(Spain) Gonzalo de Andrés (France) Jean-Baptiste Simmenauer	(Spain) SMC Motorsport	3	5	**DSQ**	6	6	**2**	61
8	(Italy) Giacomo Altoè	(Switzerland) Kessel Racing	6		4		2	5	59
9	(United States) Rey Acosta III (Italy) Marco Bonanomi	(Italy) AF Corse	4	8	5	5	Ret	3	59
10	(Italy) Lorenzo Ferrari	(Switzerland) Kessel Racing		4		**1**			38
11	(Spain) Josep Mayola	(Spain) Biogas Motorsport	Ret	9	10	8	8	7	25
12	(Colombia) Sebastián Moreno	(France) Code Racing Development	**Ret**	**Ret**	6				17
13	(Switzerland) Ethan Ischer	(France) Code Racing Development		**Ret**	6				16
14	(Spain) Marc Carol	(Spain) Biogas Motorsport	Ret	9		8	8	7	16
15	(France) Viny Beltramelli (France) Pascal Huteau	(France) Code Racing Development				3			15
16	(Switzerland) Claude Bouvet (United Kingdom) Tom Canning	(United Kingdom) Ecurie Ecosse Blackthorn	DNS	6		Ret	7		14
17	(United Kingdom) George King (Belgium) Stéphane Lémeret	(France) Code Racing Development					**4**		13
18	(France) Marius Fossard	(France) Racing Spirit of Léman				4			12
19	(Spain) Fran Rueda	(Spain) Biogas Motorsport			10				9
20	(Germany) Nico Hantke	(France) Code Racing Development	**Ret**						1
21	(France) Antoine Comeau (United States) Nicky Hays	(France) Code Racing Development						Ret	0
22	(France) Romain Leroux (Italy) Giacomo Petrobelli	(United Kingdom) Ecurie Ecosse Blackthorn			Ret				0
Drivers ineligible to score points
	(United States) Anthony Bartone (Luxembourg) Steve Jans	(Germany) GetSpeed			2				
	(France) Arnold Robin (France) Maxime Robin	(Belgium) Team WRT			8				
	(Italy) Tommaso Mosca (Puerto Rico) Francesco Piovanetti	(Italy) AF Corse			9				
	(United Kingdom) Michael Birch (Australia) Garnet Patterson	(United Kingdom) United Autosports			Ret				
	(United Kingdom) Charlie Fagg (Japan) Norikazu Shibata	(Italy) AF Corse			Ret				
	(Germany) Max Moritz (Netherlands) Morris Schuring	(Denmark) High Class Racing			Ret				
	(United Kingdom) Charles Bateman (Belgium) Kobe Pauwels	(United Kingdom) Ecurie Ecosse Blackthorn			Ret				
	(France) Patrick Charlaix (France) Marvin Klein	(Germany) GetSpeed			WD				
Pos.	Driver	Team	BAR (Spain)	LEC (France)	LMS (France)	SPA (Belgium)	SIL (United Kingdom)	POR (Portugal)	Points

Key
Colour	Result
Gold	Race winner
Silver	2nd place
Bronze	3rd place
Green	Points finish
Blue	Non-points finish
Blue	Non-classified finish (NC)
Purple	Did not finish (Ret)
Black	Disqualified (DSQ)
Black	Excluded (EX)
White	Did not start (DNS)
White	Race cancelled (C)
White	Withdrew (WD)
Blank	Did not participate

**Bold** – Pole

Italics – Fastest Lap

=== GT3 Teams' Championship ===
Pos.	Team	Car	BAR (Spain)	LEC (France)	LMS (France)	SPA (Belgium)	SIL (United Kingdom)	POR (Portugal)	Points
1	(France) #10 Racing Spirit of Léman	Aston Martin Vantage AMR GT3 Evo	1	3	1	4	9	6	100
2	(Switzerland) #21 Kessel Racing	Ferrari 296 GT3 Evo	6	4	4	**1**	2	5	97
3	(Italy) #17 Kessel Racing	Ferrari 296 GT3 Evo	Ret	1	Ret	2	1	1	93
4	(Italy) #54 Dinamic GT	Porsche 911 GT3 R (992.2)	2	7	3	7	3	8	76
5	(Italy) #51 AF Corse	Ferrari 296 GT3 Evo	5	2	7	Ret	5	4	62
6	(Spain) #77 SMC Motorsport	McLaren 720S GT3 Evo	3	5	**DSQ**	6	6	**2**	61
7	(Italy) #88 AF Corse	Ferrari 296 GT3 Evo	4	8	5	5	Ret	3	59
8	(France) #11 Code Racing Development	Aston Martin Vantage AMR GT3 Evo	**Ret**	**Ret**	6	3	**4**	Ret	45
9	(Spain) #23 Biogas Motorsport	Ferrari 296 GT3 1–2; Ferrari 296 GT3 Evo 3–6	Ret	9	10	8	8	7	25
10	(United Kingdom) #91 Ecurie Ecosse Blackthorn	Aston Martin Vantage AMR GT3 Evo	DNS	6	Ret	Ret	7	Ret	14
Teams ineligible to score points
	(Germany) #14 GetSpeed	Mercedes-AMG GT3 Evo			2				
	(Belgium) #72 Team WRT	BMW M4 GT3 Evo			8				
	(Italy) #55 AF Corse	Ferrari 296 GT3			9				
	(United Kingdom) #95 United Autosports	McLaren 720S GT3 Evo			Ret				
	(Italy) #83 AF Corse	Ferrari 296 GT3 Evo			Ret				
	(Denmark) #45 High Class Racing	Porsche 911 GT3 R (992.1)			Ret				
	(United Kingdom) #90 Ecurie Ecosse Blackthorn	Aston Martin Vantage AMR GT3 Evo			Ret				
Pos.	Team	Car	BAR (Spain)	LEC (France)	LMS (France)	SPA (Belgium)	SIL (United Kingdom)	POR (Portugal)	Points
