= Arthur Rogeon =

French racing driver (born 2006)

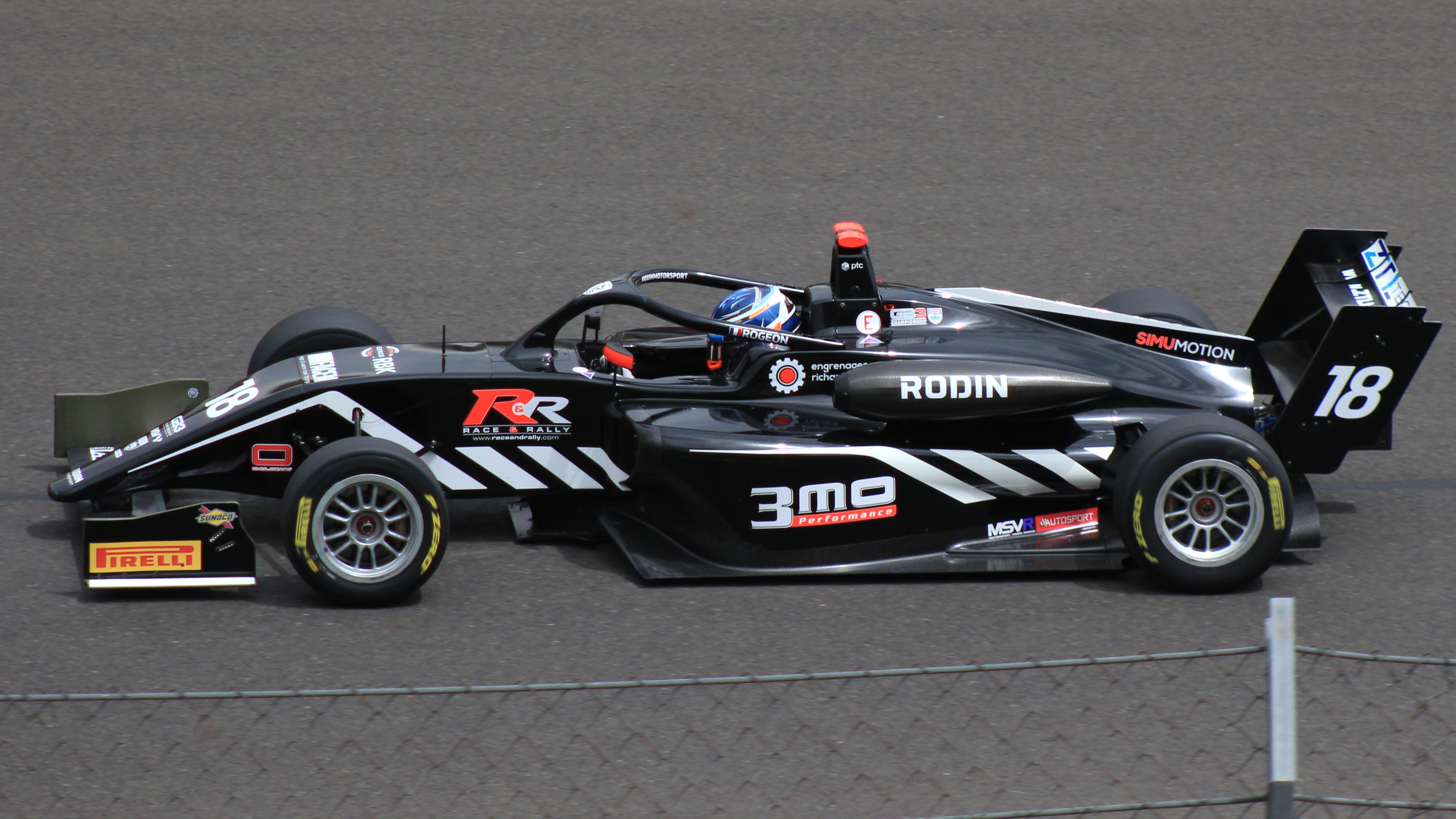
- Rogeon in 2024
- Nationality: (France) French
- Born: 16 September 2006 (age 20) Cholet, France

Le Mans Cup career
- Debut season: 2025
- Current team: Brutal Fish by Campos
- Categorisation: FIA Silver
- Car number: 12
- Former teams: CD Sport
- Starts: 13
- Wins: 1
- Podiums: 3
- Poles: 1
- Fastest laps: 1
- Best finish: 2nd in 2026
- Statistics up to date as of 14 October 2026.

Arthur Rogeon (born 16 September 2006) is a French racing driver who last competed for Brutal Fish by Campos in the LMP3 class of the Le Mans Cup. He notably won the 2026 Road to Le Mans for Brutal Fish by Campos, and previously won in the GB3 Championship for Rodin Motorsport.

== Career ==
Rogeon began competitive karting in 2017, a year in which he most notably finished third in Coupe de France's Cadet category. Stepping up to junior karts in 2018, Rogeon mostly raced in France, but won the Ayrton Senna Trophy in OK-J in Italy towards the end of the year. Across the following two seasons, Rogeon remained in junior karts as he mostly raced internationally, but found more success in France, finishing fifth in the 2019 French Championship standings. Following that, Rogeon competed in senior karts between 2021 and 2022 for a variety of teams, whilst also making one-off appearances in KZ2 across both years.

In 2023, Rogeon made his single-seater debut, joining Chris Dittmann Racing to compete in the GB3 Championship. After taking his maiden podium in the reverse-grid race three at Silverstone by finishing third, Rogeon then took further race three podiums by finishing second at Snetterton and third at Zandvoort, en route to a 21st-place points finish. The following year, Rogeon switched to Rodin Motorsport for his second season in GB3. In the eight-race season, Rogeon won the reverse-grid races at the Hungaroring, Silverstone and Donington Park to end the year eighth in points.

Rogeon then made the switch to endurance racing in 2025, joining CD Sport to compete in the European Endurance Prototype Cup and the LMP3 class of the Le Mans Cup. Between the two campaigns, Rogeon found more success in the latter, scoring points at Barcelona and Silverstone to finish 14th in points alongside Thomas Imbourg. Continuing in the Le Mans Cup for 2026 but switching to newcomers Brutal Fish by Campos, Rogeon retired in the first two races before winning the blue-riband Road to Le Mans from pole alongside August Raber, before taking further podiums at Spa and Algarve to clinch runner-up honours in points. Towards the end of the year, Rogeon partook in the European Le Mans Series rookie tests for Ultimate in LMP3.

== Karting record ==
=== Karting career summary ===
Season	Series	Team	Position
2017	National Series Karting – Cadet	Cedric Sport	20th
2017	Coupe de France – Cadet	Cedric Sport	3rd
2017	Championnat de France – Cadet	Cedric Sport	6th
2018	National Series Karting – Nationale		76th
2018	Championnat de France – Junior	Yohann Cresson Racing	57th
2018	Challenge Rotax Max France – Nationale	Yohann Cresson Racing	11th
2018	Ayrton Senna Trophy – OK-J		1st
2019	South Garda Winter Cup – OK-J	Stephane Rogeon	NC
2019	Championnat de France – Junior		5th
2019	Coupe de France – OK-J	Trefle Racing; Kart Management (Note: Rogeon competed for Trefle Racing in round 1 and for Kart Management in round 2.)	25th
2019	Karting European Championship – OK-J	Stephane Rogeon	37th
2019	National Series Karting – Nationale	Kart Management	21st
2020	South Garda Winter Cup – OK-J	Arthur Rogeon	NC
2020	WSK Super Master Series – OK-J	Stephane Rogeon	81st
2020	WSK Euro Series – OK-J	Exprit Racing Team	74th
2020	Champions of the Future – OK-J	Exprit Racing Team	12th
2020	Karting European Championship – OK-J	Exprit Racing Team	76th
2020	Karting World Championship – OK-J	Exprit Racing Team	48th
2021	WSK Super Master Series – OK	CRG Racing Team	39th
2021	WSK Euro Series – OK	CRG Racing Team; Ward Racing (Note: Rogeon competed for CRG Racing Team in round 1 and for Ward Racing in round 3.)	46th
2021	Champions of the Future – OK	CRG Racing Team; Ward Racing; Praga Racing Team (Note: Rogeon competed for CRG Racing Team in round 1, for Ward Racing in round 2 and for Praga Racing Team in round 3.)	70th
2021	Karting European Championship – OK	CRG Racing Team; Ward Racing (Note: Rogeon competed for CRG Racing Team in round 1 and for Ward Racing in rounds 2–4.)	48th
2021	WSK Open Cup – OK	Praga Racing Team	23rd
2021	Championnat de France – KZ2	Kart Management	
2021	Karting World Championship – OK	Praga Racing Team	42nd
2022	Champions of the Future – OK	VDK Racing	23rd
2022	Karting European Championship – OK	VDK Racing	26th
2022	WSK Euro Series – OK	Seah Technologies	30th
2022	IAME Euro Series – X30 Senior	VDK Racing	184th
2022	Karting World Cup – KZ2	KR Motorsport	87th
2022	Karting World Championship – OK	VDK Racing	39th

== Racing record ==
=== Career summary ===
Season	Series	Team	Races	Wins	Poles	F/Laps	Podiums	Points	Position
2023	GB3 Championship	Chris Dittmann Racing	23	0	0	0	3	123	21st
2024	GB3 Championship	Rodin Motorsport	23	3	0	1	4	258	8th
2025	European Endurance Prototype Cup	CD Sport	5	0	0	1	0	2	50th
2025	Le Mans Cup – LMP3	CD Sport	7	0	0	0	0	14	14th
2026	Le Mans Cup – LMP3	Brutal Fish by Campos	6	1	1	1	3	85	**2nd**

=== Complete GB3 Championship results ===
(key) (Races in bold indicate pole position) (Races in italics indicate fastest lap)

Year	Team	1	2	3	4	5	6	7	8	9	10	11	12	13	14	15	16	17	18	19	20	21	22	23	24	DC	Points
2023	Chris Dittmann Racing	OUL; 1; 18	OUL; 2; 20	OUL; 3 Ret	SIL1; 1; 21	SIL1; 2; 10	SIL1; 3; 3^{2}	SPA; 1 Ret	SPA; 2; 17	SPA; 3; 20	SNE; 1; 16	SNE; 2; 21	SNE; 3; 2	SIL2; 1; 16	SIL2; 2; 13	SIL2; 3 C	BRH; 1; 12	BRH; 2 Ret	BRH; 3 Ret	ZAN; 1; 15	ZAN; 2; 16	ZAN; 3; 3^{7}	DON; 1; 13	DON; 2 Ret	DON; 3; 14	21st	123
2024	Rodin Motorsport	OUL; 1; 7	OUL; 2; 10	OUL; 3; 6	SIL1; 1; 16	SIL1; 2; 18	SIL1; 3 C	SPA; 1; 15	SPA; 2; 9	SPA; 3; 8^{5}	HUN; 1; 9	HUN; 2 Ret	HUN; 3; 1^{1}	ZAN; 1; 13	ZAN; 2; 13	ZAN; 3; 16	SIL2; 1; 12	SIL2; 2; 11	SIL2; 3; 1^{1}	DON; 1; 12	DON; 2; 5	DON; 3; 1	BRH; 1; 8	BRH; 2; 6	BRH; 3; 3^{1}	8th	258

=== Complete Le Mans Cup results ===
(key) (Races in bold indicate pole position) (Races in italics indicate the fastest lap)

Year	Entrant	Class	Car	1	2	3	4	5	6	7	DC	Points
2025	CD Sport	LMP3	Duqueine D09	CAT; 7	LEC; Ret	LMS; 1; 16	LMS; 2; 13	SPA; Ret	SIL; 6	ALG; 15	14th	14
2026	Brutal Fish by Campos	LMP3	Ligier JS P325	BAR; Ret	LEC; Ret	**LMS**; 1	SPA; 2	SIL; 5	POR; 2		2nd	85

^{*} Season still in progress.
