= James Vowles =

Team principal of Williams Racing (born 1979)

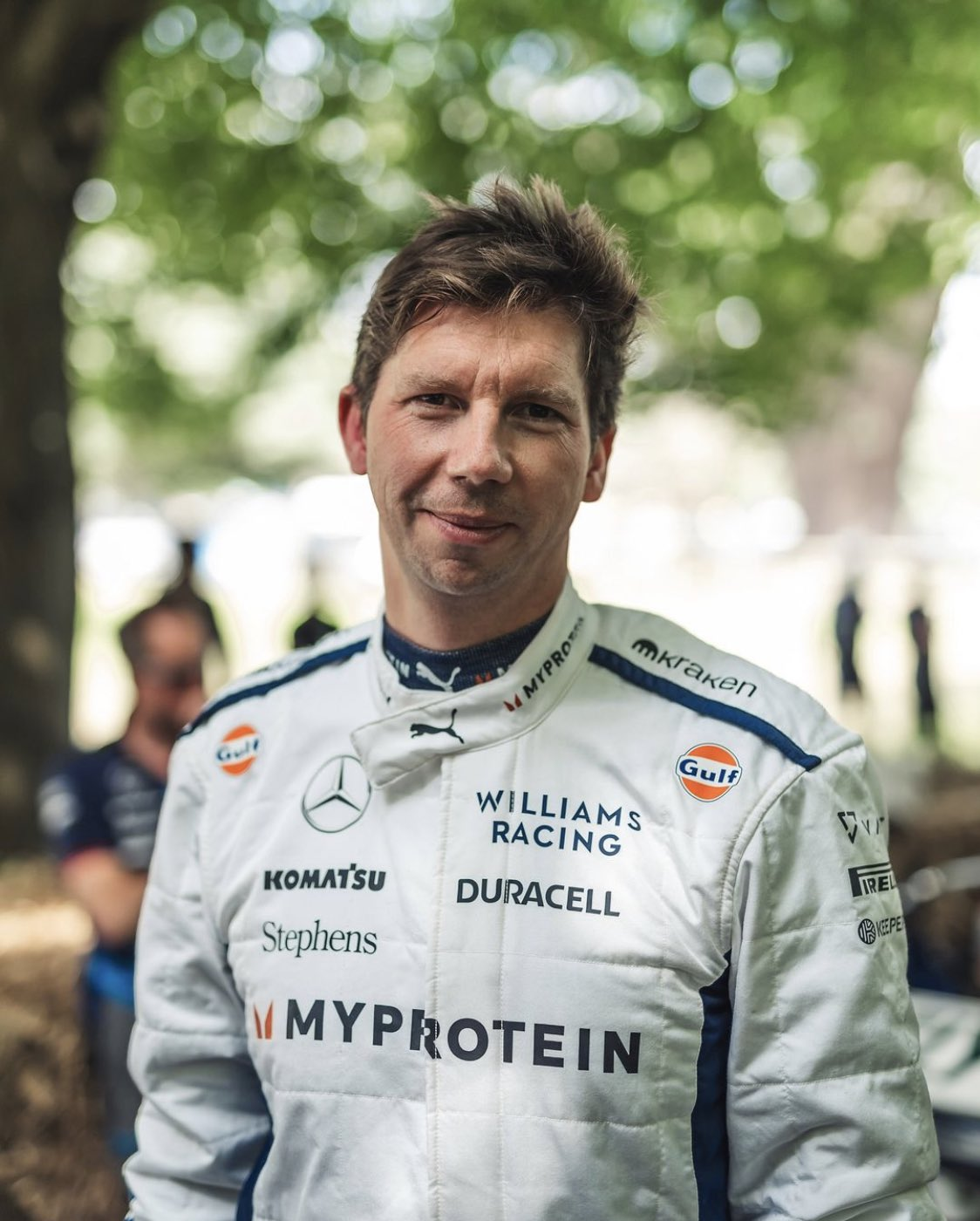
- Vowles in 2024
- Born: James Patrick Vowles; 20 June 1979 (age 47); Felbridge, England
- Education: University of East Anglia (BSc); Cranfield University (MSc)
- Occupations: Motorsport executive; Race strategist; engineer
- Employers: BAR (2001–2005); Honda (2006–2008); Brawn GP (2009); Mercedes (2010–2022); Williams (2023–present)
- Title: Team Principal
- Spouse: Rachel Rolph
- Children: 2

James Patrick Vowles (born 20 June 1979) is a British racing driver, motorsport engineer and Team Principal of Williams. Before joining Williams, he was the motorsport strategy director at Mercedes-AMG Petronas Formula One Team. He was also responsible for the Brawn GP race strategy, which was critical to the team's championship-winning 2009 season. He has worked in Formula One for over 20 years, including under the leadership of team principals David Richards, Ross Brawn, and Toto Wolff, and has played a key role in nine Constructors' Championships, eight Drivers' Championships and over 100 Grand Prix wins.

== Education ==
Vowles attended the International School of Geneva, graduating in 1997 with an International Baccalaureate. He went on to the University of East Anglia, obtaining a degree in computer science in 2000. During his studies, he sought opportunities in various Formula One teams, aiming to apply his mathematical expertise in the racing industry; however, he encountered rejection from all of them, as they did not require mathematicians at the time. Some of the rejection letters suggested him to obtain an engineering degree instead, if he wanted to have a better chance in the sport.

Vowles pursued his passion for motorsport by earning a master's degree in Motorsport Engineering and Management from Cranfield University in 2001. As a student at Cranfield, he contributed to a project that won the Prodrive Award of Excellence for designing a racing car for the Jim Russell Racing School. The award ceremony was attended by several Formula One teams and he received multiple job offers the following day.

== Career ==
Vowles started his career in Formula One with British American Racing in 2001 and stayed with the team through its transitions to Honda Racing F1, Brawn GP, and Mercedes. During his career in F1, he has worked with world champions Jacques Villeneuve, Jenson Button, Michael Schumacher, Lewis Hamilton, and Nico Rosberg. In February 2023, he became team principal at Williams Racing.

=== Brawn (2009) ===
Vowles was the chief strategist of Brawn GP, a team that competed in the 2009 season. He was responsible for planning and executing the race strategy for the team's drivers, Jenson Button and Rubens Barrichello. Vowles played a key role in Brawn GP's remarkable success, as the team won eight races and both the drivers' and constructors' championships in its debut and only season. He also helped to overcome some of the challenges that Brawn GP faced, such as a limited budget and a late start to testing.

=== Mercedes (2010–2022) ===
Vowles stayed with Brawn when it was bought by Mercedes at the end of 2009. Vowles, who was once seen as a potential successor to Toto Wolff as Mercedes team principal, was one of the key figures behind Mercedes' unprecedented success in Formula One from 2014 to 2021, winning eight consecutive constructors' championships and seven drivers' titles with Lewis Hamilton and Nico Rosberg. He was promoted from Chief Strategist to Motorsport Strategy Director in 2019, and was responsible for overseeing the race strategy, performance analysis, and simulation departments. Vowles was also known for his radio communications with the drivers during the races, most notably his interactions with Valtteri Bottas whenever Hamilton needed to use him for a benefit. This would later lead his opening message, "Valtteri, it's James," to become an internet meme.

=== Williams (2023–present) ===
In January 2023, he announced he was leaving Mercedes to become the team principal of Williams Racing, replacing Jost Capito who stepped down in December 2022. In an interview with The Daily Telegraph, Vowles said that he felt "too comfortable" at Mercedes and was looking for a new challenge. He described the offer of team principal at Williams as an "opportunity of a lifetime". Vowles said he was honoured to join Williams, an icon of the sport, and looked forward to the challenge of reviving their fortunes. He is only the third team principal in the team's history.

In June 2025 after the Canadian Grand Prix, Williams announced that Vowles had signed a long-term contract extension with the team, though the exact length of the extension hasn't been revealed. In September 2025 at the Azerbaijan Grand Prix Williams achieved a podium finish, the team's first since 2021 and the first under Vowles' leadership.

== Awards ==
In July 2017, Vowles received an honorary degree of Doctor of Science for his achievements in motorsport from the University of East Anglia. In his acceptance speech, he described Formula 1 as his profession, passion, and life. In reference to George Washington Burnap's essentials of happiness, he named Formula 1 as one of the three key ingredients to his personal happiness.

== Racing ==
In the 2022 Asian Le Mans Series, Vowles drove for the Garage 59 team.

Vowles raced in the 2025 Gulf 12 Hours in December 2025, coming tenth overall and winning the Am class for Garage 59.

=== Racing career summary ===
Season	Series	Team	Races	Wins	Poles	FLaps	Podiums	Points	Position
2022	Asian Le Mans Series - GT	Garage 59	4	0	0	0	0	2	17th
2025	Gulf 12 Hours - GT3 Am	Garage 59	1	1	0	0	1	—N/a	1st

== Personal life ==
Vowles grew up in Switzerland and is fluent in French. He currently lives in Oxford with his wife, who is a consultant breast surgeon for the NHS. They have two children, born in 2023 and 2025.
