= Burnap =

Burnap is a surname. Notable people with the surname include:

- Andrew Burnap (born 1991), American actor
- Campbell Burnap (1939–2008), British jazz trombonist, vocalist, and broadcaster
- Daniel Burnap (1759–1838), American clockmaker
- George Burnap (1885–1938), American landscape architect
- George Washington Burnap (1802–1859), Unitarian clergyman of the United States
