= August Raber =

Swedish racing driver (born 2009)

- Nationality: (Sweden) Swedish (United Arab Emirates) Emirati (Note: Raber is a Swedish citizen who lives in Dubai and regularly competes under the Emirati flag.)
- Born: 9 March 2009 (age 17) Sweden

Le Mans Cup career
- Debut season: 2026
- Current team: Brutal Fish by Campos
- Categorisation: FIA Silver
- Car number: 12
- Starts: 6
- Wins: 1
- Podiums: 3
- Poles: 1
- Fastest laps: 1
- Best finish: 2nd in 2026
- Statistics up to date as of 14 October 2026.

August Raber (born 9 March 2009) is an Emirati-based Swedish racing driver who last competed in the LMP3 class of the Le Mans Cup for Brutal Fish by Campos.

== Career ==
=== Karting and single-seaters (2017–2026) ===
Born in Sweden, Raber had his first taste of karting at the age of eight at Kristianstad, but waited until the age of 13 to begin karting on a competitive basis. After racing with Xcel Motorsport during his brief stint in competitive karts, Raber joined them for his step-up to single-seaters in 2024, in the F4 British Championship. In his rookie season, which was disrupted by a hand injury at Thruxton, Raber took a best result of ninth in the reverse-grid race at Brands Hatch to end the year 21st in the overall standings.

In late 2024, Raber joined Yas Heat Racing to compete in that year's Formula Trophy UAE and the F4 Middle East Championship. In the former, Raber scored his first career podium at the season-ending race at Yas Marina en route to an 11th-place points finish. In F4 Middle East, Raber took his maiden career win in the reverse-grid race of the second Yas Marina round, and scored an additional podium at Lusail to take eighth in points.

Returning to the F4 British Championship for the rest of 2025, Raber switched to Phinsys by Argenti for his second season in the series. After scoring two wins at Donington Park and a lone win at Snetterton to take an early championship lead, Raber then only scored four other podiums in the remaining rounds as he slipped to seventh by the end of the season. During 2025, Raber also competed for Argenti with Prema in the Silverstone and Monza rounds of the GB3 Championship. In early 2026, Raber joined Pinnacle Motorsport to compete in the four-round Formula Regional Middle East Trophy, taking a best result of 19th at Dubai and finishing last in points.

=== Sportscars (2025–) ===
In late 2025, Raber made his debut in sportscar racing, competing at the Gulf 12 Hours for Porsche-fielding Car Collection Motorsport, finishing sixth among the Pro-Am entries. Following his FRMET campaign, Raber ventured to sportscars full-time for the rest of 2026, joining Brutal Fish by Campos to compete in the LMP3 class of the Le Mans Cup alongside Arthur Rogeon. After retiring in the first two races, Raber scored his maiden win at the Road to Le Mans from pole, before taking further podiums at Spa and Algarve to secure runner-up honours. At the end of the year, Raber joined Duqueine Team to race in the LMP2 class of the 2026–27 Asian Le Mans Series.

== Karting record ==
=== Karting career summary ===
Season	Series	Team	Position
2023	Rotax Max Euro Trophy — Junior Max	Xcel Motorsport	20th
2023	Champions of the Future Academy Program — OK-N		8th
2024	IAME Winter Cup — X30 Senior	Fusion Motorsport	110th

== Racing record ==
=== Racing career summary ===
Season	Series	Team	Races	Wins	Poles	F/Laps	Podiums	Points	Position
2024	F4 British Championship	Xcel Motorsport	21	0	0	0	0	19.5	21st
2024	Formula Trophy UAE	Yas Heat Racing	7	0	0	0	1	33	11th
2025	F4 Middle East Championship	Yas Heat Racing Academy	15	1	0	0	2	86	8th
2025	F4 British Championship	Phinsys by Argenti	31	3	0	2	7	188	7th
2025	GB3 Championship	Argenti with Prema	6	0	0	0	0	24	30th
2025	Gulf 12 Hours – Pro-Am	Car Collection Motorsport	1	0	0	0	0	—N/a	6th
2026	Formula Regional Middle East Trophy	Pinnacle Motorsport	11	0	0	0	0	0	36th
2026	Le Mans Cup – LMP3	Brutal Fish by Campos	6	1	1	1	3	85	**2nd**
2026–27	Asian Le Mans Series – LMP2	Duqueine Team							

* Season still in progress.

^{†} As Raber was a guest driver, he was ineligible for points.

=== Complete F4 British Championship results ===
(key) (Races in bold indicate pole position) (Races in italics indicate fastest lap)

Year	Team	1	2	3	4	5	6	7	8	9	10	11	12	13	14	15	16	17	18	19	20	21	22	23	24	25	26	27	28	29	30	31	32	DC	Points
2024	Xcel Motorsport	DPN; 1 Ret	DPN; 2; 21^{1}	DPN; 3 C	BHI; 1; 20	BHI; 2; 5	BHI; 3; 11	SNE; 1; 14	SNE; 2; 14^{7}	SNE; 3; 15	THR; 1 Ret	THR; 2 DNS	THR; 3 DNS	SILGP; 1 WD	SILGP; 2 WD	SILGP; 3 WD	ZAN; 1 DNS	ZAN; 2; 22^{2}	ZAN; 3; 17	KNO; 1	KNO; 2	KNO; 3	DPGP; 1; 13	DPGP; 2; 12	DPGP; 3; 16^{1}	DPGP; 4 Ret	SILN; 1; 10	SILN; 2 C	SILN; 3; 16	BHGP; 1; 19	BHGP; 2; 14^{1}	BHGP; 3; 14^{1}	BHGP; 4 Ret	21st	19.5
2025	Phinsys by Argenti	DPN; 1; 1	DPN; 2; 13	DPN; 3; 1	SILGP; 1; 5	SILGP; 2; 6^{2}	SILGP; 3; 16	SNE; 1; 12	SNE; 2; 1	SNE; 3; 7	THR; 1 Ret	THR; 2; 15	THR; 3; 5	OUL; 1 Ret	OUL; 2; 3	OUL; 3; 8	SILGP; 1; 15	SILGP; 2; 11	ZAN; 1; 21	ZAN; 2; 10^{9}	ZAN; 3; 9	KNO; 1; 13	KNO; 2; 3	KNO; 3; 10	DPGP; 1; 5	DPGP; 2; 4^{1}	DPGP; 3; 3	SILN; 1; 9	SILN; 2; 2^{1}	SILN; 3; 6	BHGP; 1 DNS	BHGP; 2; 17^{6}	BHGP; 3; 8	7th	188

=== Complete Formula Trophy UAE results ===
(key) (Races in bold indicate pole position; races in italics indicate fastest lap)

Year	Team	1	2	3	4	5	6	7	DC	Points
2024	Yas Heat Racing	DUB; 1; 9	DUB; 2; 8	DUB; 3; 10	YMC1; 1; 10	YMC1; 2; 7	YMC2; 1; 8	YMC2; 2; 3	11th	33

=== Complete F4 Middle East Championship results ===
(key) (Races in bold indicate pole position; races in italics indicate fastest lap)

Year	Team	1	2	3	4	5	6	7	8	9	10	11	12	13	14	15	DC	Points
2025	Yas Heat Racing Academy	YMC1; 1; 18	YMC1; 2; 24†	YMC1; 3 Ret	YMC2; 1; 10	YMC2; 2; 1	YMC2; 3 Ret	DUB; 1 Ret	DUB; 2; 10	DUB; 3; 21	YMC3; 1; 11	YMC3; 2; 4	YMC3; 3; 15	LUS; 1; 3	LUS; 2; 10	LUS; 3; 5	8th	86

=== Complete GB3 Championship results ===
(key) (Races in bold indicate pole position) (Races in italics indicate fastest lap)

Year	Team	1	2	3	4	5	6	7	8	9	10	11	12	13	14	15	16	17	18	19	20	21	22	23	24	DC	Points
2025	Argenti with Prema	SIL1; 1	SIL1; 2	SIL1; 3	ZAN; 1	ZAN; 2	ZAN; 3	SPA; 1	SPA; 2	SPA; 3	HUN; 1	HUN; 2	HUN; 3	SIL2; 1; 13	SIL2; 2; 15	SIL2; 3; 17^{4}	BRH; 1	BRH; 2	BRH; 3	DON; 1	DON; 2	DON; 3	MNZ; 1; 15	MNZ; 2 Ret	MNZ; 3; 17	30th	24

=== Complete Formula Regional Middle East Trophy results ===
(key) (Races in bold indicate pole position) (Races in italics indicate fastest lap)

Year	Entrant	1	2	3	4	5	6	7	8	9	10	11	12	DC	Points
2026	Pinnacle Motorsport	YMC1; 1; 28	YMC1; 2; 19	YMC1; 3 Ret	YMC2; 1; 20	YMC2; 2; 24	YMC2; 3; 27	DUB; 1; 26	DUB; 2; 21	DUB; 3; 19	LUS; 1; 20	LUS; 2 C	LUS; 3; 25	36th	0

=== Complete Le Mans Cup results ===
(key) (Races in bold indicate pole position) (Races in italics indicate the fastest lap)

Year	Entrant	Class	Chassis	1	2	3	4	5	6	Rank	Points
2026	Brutal Fish by Campos	LMP3	Ligier JS P325	BAR; Ret	LEC; Ret	**LMS**; 1	SPA; 2	SIL; 5	POR; 2	2nd	85

^{*} Season still in progress.
