= Cédric Oltramare =

Swiss racing driver (born 2002)

- Nationality: (Switzerland) Swiss
- Born: 22 June 2002 (age 24) Switzerland

European Le Mans Series career
- Debut season: 2024
- Current team: CLX Motorsport
- Categorisation: FIA Bronze (2021); FIA Silver (2022–)
- Car number: 97
- Starts: 5 (5 entries)
- Wins: 0
- Podiums: 2
- Poles: 0
- Fastest laps: 0
- Best finish: 8th in 2024

Previous series
- 2023 2023 2021–22: Le Mans Cup - LMP3; Asian Le Mans Series - LMP3; Ligier European Series - JS2 R

Cédric Oltramare (born 22 June 2002) is a Swiss racing driver. He competes in the Michelin Le Mans Cup, driving in the LMP3 class for CLX Motorsport. Oltramare is a race winner in the JS2 R class of the Ligier European Series, an accolade he achieved in 2022.

== Career ==
Oltramare made his racing debut in 2021, driving in the Ligier European Series with Cool Racing where he drove a Ligier JS2 R in the eponymous class. He scored five podiums and finished all 12 races, placing him fourth at the end of the season. He returned for a second year in 2022 but would retire from the first six races, which included accidents and two car-related issues. Though he took three podiums, including a victory at Monza, Oltramare ended up sixth in the JS2 R standings.

Having gained his first experience in a Ligier JS P320 prototype in July 2022, Oltramare entered the LMP3 category in 2023 by taking part in the Asian Le Mans Series. Once again at Cool Racing, he and teammates Marcos Siebert and Adrien Chila finished eighth in the drivers' standings, taking a podium on Yas Island to cap off the campaign. This served as a precursor to Oltramare's LMP3 venture, which he continued in the Le Mans Cup alongside bronze-ranked Chila. He was also originally supposed to join the team in the European Le Mans Series but was replaced by Alex García before the season opener.

A strong result looked on the horizon at the first race in Barcelona, but Oltramare lost the lead he'd inherited during the pit stop phase to Gillian Henrion and later faded to sixth due to two spins, having struggled to keep his car's tyres alive. A retirement during the second of the Road to Le Mans races followed, before the duo finished second at Le Castellet, with the Swiss driver once again being overtaken by the No. 16 Virage. Oltramare would lose another inherited lead at Aragón where he eventually finished fourth, before a retirement and a tenth place in the final races placed him and Chila fifth in the championship.

For the 2024 season, Oltramare would enter the ELMS with Cool Racing, partnering Manuel Espírito Santo and Miguel Cristóvão. At the season opener in Barcelona, Oltramare finished second after Espírito Santo qualified on pole. Fifth and eighth at Le Castellet and Imola were followed by a third place at Spa. The team's title hopes ended shortly after the red flag restart in Mugello, as the Cool Racing car was involved in an incident with the No. 5 RLR MSport entry which put it out of the race on the spot. Oltramare did not race in the final round.

Oltramare returned to the Le Mans Cup in 2025, partnering David Droux at the now renamed CLX Motorsport.

== Racing record ==
=== Racing career summary ===
Season	Series	Team	Races	Wins	Poles	F/Laps	Podiums	Points	Position
2021	Ligier European Series - JS2 R	Cool Racing	12	0	0	0	5	147	4th
2022	Ligier European Series - JS2 R	Cool Racing	12	1	0	0	3	73	6th
2023	Asian Le Mans Series - LMP3	Cool Racing	4	0	0	0	1	26	8th
2023	Le Mans Cup - LMP3	Cool Racing	7	0	0	0	1	42	5th
2024	European Le Mans Series - LMP3	Cool Racing	5	0	0	0	2	49	8th
2024	Ultimate Cup Series - Proto P3	Cool Racing	1	0	1	1	0	12	31st
2025	Le Mans Cup - LMP3	CLX Motorsport	7	1	0	0	2	57	6th
2026	Le Mans Cup - LMP3	CLX Motorsport	3	0	0	0	0	2	27th

*Season still in progress.

=== Complete Ligier European Series results ===
(key) (Races in bold indicate pole position; results in italics indicate fastest lap)

Year	Entrant	Class	Chassis	1	2	3	4	5	6	7	8	9	10	11	12	Rank	Points
2021	Cool Racing	JS2 R	Ligier JS2 R	CAT; 1; 6	CAT; 2; 4	RBR; 1; 8	RBR; 2; 5	LEC; 1; 3	LEC; 2; 2	MNZ; 1; 6	MNZ; 2; 3	SPA; 1; 2	SPA; 2; 3	ALG; 1; 4	ALG; 2; 4	4th	147
2022	Cool Racing	JS2 R	Ligier JS2 R	LEC; 1 Ret	LEC; 2 Ret	IMO; 1 Ret	IMO; 2 Ret	LMS; 1 Ret	LMS; 2 Ret	MNZ; 1; 1	MNZ; 2; 2	SPA; 1 Ret	SPA; 2; 2	ALG; 1; 4	ALG; 2 Ret	6th	73

=== Complete Asian Le Mans Series results ===
(key) (Races in bold indicate pole position) (Races in italics indicate fastest lap)

Year	Team	Class	Car	Engine	1	2	3	4	Pos.	Points
2023	Cool Racing	LMP3	Ligier JS P320	Nissan VK56DE 5.6L V8	DUB; 1; 14	DUB; 2 Ret	ABU; 1; 6	ABU; 2; 2	8th	26

=== Complete Le Mans Cup results ===
(key) (Races in bold indicate pole position; results in italics indicate fastest lap)

Year	Entrant	Class	Chassis	1	2	3	4	5	6	7	Rank	Points
2023	Cool Racing	LMP3	Ligier JS P320	CAT; 6	LMS; 1; 10	LMS; 2 Ret	**LEC**; 2	ARA; 4	SPA; Ret	ALG; 10	5th	42
2025	CLX Motorsport	LMP3	Ligier JS P325	CAT; 1	LEC; 2	LMS; 1; 14	LMS; 2; 18	SPA; 9	SIL; 7	ALG; 7	6th	57
2026	CLX Motorsport	LMP3	Ligier JS P325	BAR; 9	LEC; 16	LMS; Ret	SPA	SIL	POR		27th	2

^{*} Season still in progress.

=== Complete European Le Mans Series results ===
(key) (Races in bold indicate pole position; results in italics indicate fastest lap)

Year	Entrant	Class	Chassis	Engine	1	2	3	4	5	6	Rank	Points
2024	Cool Racing	LMP3	Ligier JS P320	Nissan VK56DE 5.6L V8	**CAT**; 2	LEC; 5	IMO; 8	SPA; 3	**MUG**; Ret	ALG	8th	49

^{*} Season still in progress.
