= 2025 Gulf 12 Hours =

15th Gulf 12 Hours endurance race

Race details
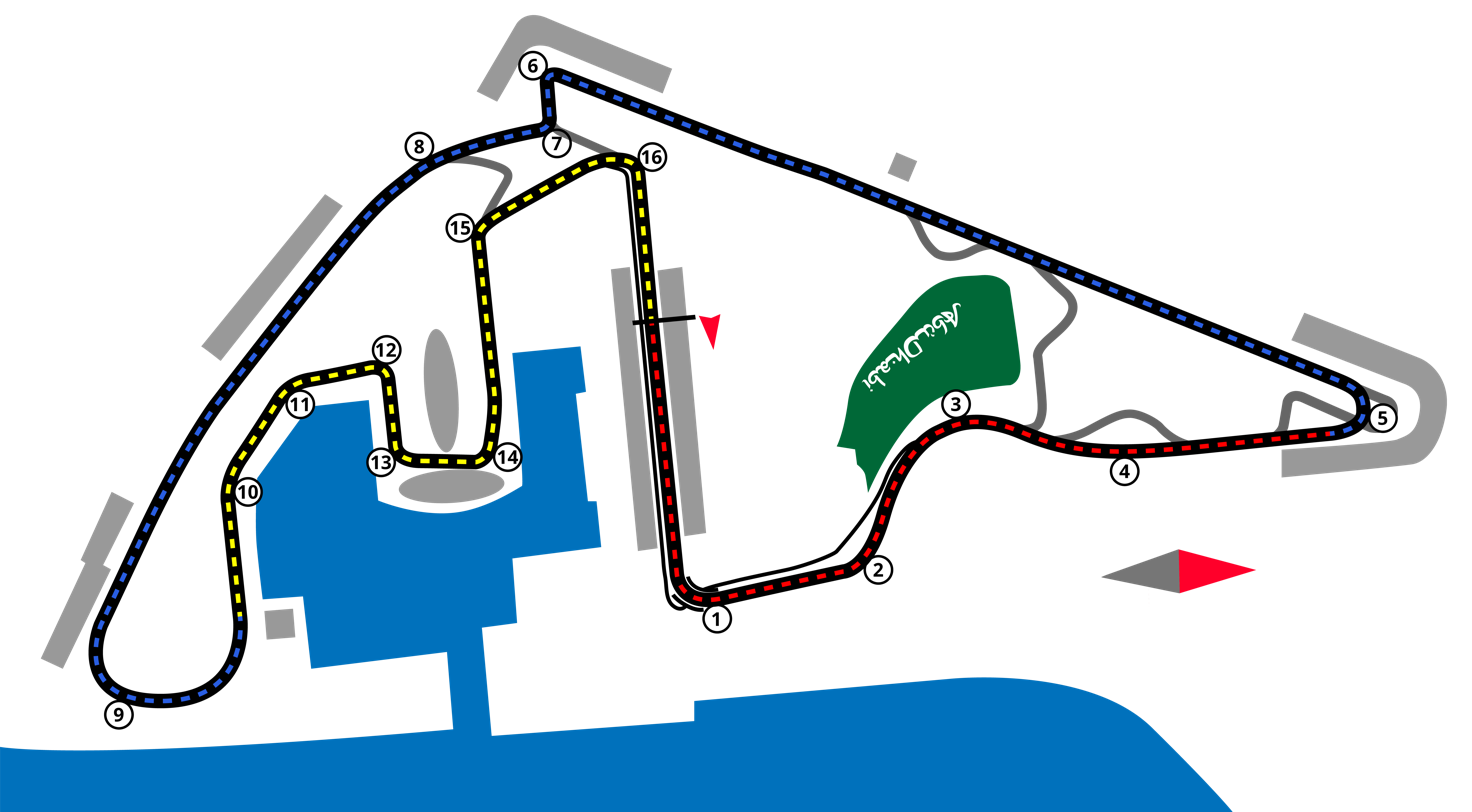
Date	14 December 2025
Official name	Gulf 12 Hours
Location	Yas Island, Abu Dhabi, UAE
Course	Permanent circuit 5.281 km (3.281 mi)
Distance	Race; 12 hours
- Qualifying

Pole
Drivers	(United States) Brendan Iribe (United Kingdom) Ollie Millroy (Denmark) Frederik Schandorff	(United Kingdom) Inception Racing
Avg Time	1:52.641
- Race

Fastest lap
Driver	(Andorra) Jules Gounon	(Australia) Grove Racing with GetSpeed
Time	1:52.199

Podium
First	Mikhail Aleshin (United Kingdom) Adam Christodoulou; Denis Remenyako	(Germany) Capital RT by Motopark
Second	(Oman) Al Faisal Al Zubair (United Kingdom) Chris Froggatt (United Kingdom) Ben Tuck	(Oman) AlManar by Dragon Racing
Third	(Andorra) Jules Gounon (Australia) Brenton Grove (Australia) Stephen Grove	(Australia) Grove Racing with GetSpeed

The 2025 Gulf 12 Hours was the 15th edition of the Gulf 12 Hours. It was held at Yas Marina Circuit on 12–14 December 2025. The race was split in two parts, one eight hour segment, followed by a two-hour break, and then the remaining four hours after that.

New for this race was the GTX1 class, which is made up of various single-make cars from Ferrari Challenge, Lamborghini Super Trofeo, McLaren Artura Trophy and Porsche Carrera Cup, although none were entered.

== Entry list ==
=== GT3 ===
Team	Car	Engine	No.	Drivers	Class
(South Africa) Into Africa Racing by HAAS RT	Audi R8 LMS Evo II	Audi DAR 5.2 L V10	2	(Zimbabwe) Axcil Jefferies	P
(South Africa) Into Africa Racing by HAAS RT	Audi R8 LMS Evo II	Audi DAR 5.2 L V10	2	(South Africa) Xolile Letlaka	P
(South Africa) Into Africa Racing by HAAS RT	Audi R8 LMS Evo II	Audi DAR 5.2 L V10	2	(South Africa) Stuart White	P
(Antigua and Barbuda) HAAS RT	Audi R8 LMS Evo II	Audi DAR 5.2 L V10	21	(Belgium) Simon Balcaen	PA
(Antigua and Barbuda) HAAS RT	Audi R8 LMS Evo II	Audi DAR 5.2 L V10	21	(Belgium) Peter Guelinckx	PA
(Antigua and Barbuda) HAAS RT	Audi R8 LMS Evo II	Audi DAR 5.2 L V10	21	(France) Steven Palette	PA
(Germany) Car Collection Motorsport	Porsche 911 GT3 R (992)	Porsche M97/80 4.2 L Flat-6	3	Aleksey Denisov (Note: Salikhov and Stolyarov are Russian, but they compete as neutral competitors as Russian national emblems were banned by the FIA following the Russian invasion of Ukraine.)	PA
(Germany) Car Collection Motorsport	Porsche 911 GT3 R (992)	Porsche M97/80 4.2 L Flat-6	3	Victor Plekhanov	PA
(Germany) Car Collection Motorsport	Porsche 911 GT3 R (992)	Porsche M97/80 4.2 L Flat-6	3	(United Arab Emirates) August Raber	PA
(Germany) Car Collection Motorsport	Porsche 911 GT3 R (992)	Porsche M97/80 4.2 L Flat-6	3	Damir Saitov	PA
(Australia) Grove Racing with GetSpeed	Mercedes-AMG GT3 Evo	Mercedes-AMG M159 6.2 L V8	4	(Andorra) Jules Gounon	P
(Australia) Grove Racing with GetSpeed	Mercedes-AMG GT3 Evo	Mercedes-AMG M159 6.2 L V8	4	(Australia) Brenton Grove	P
(Australia) Grove Racing with GetSpeed	Mercedes-AMG GT3 Evo	Mercedes-AMG M159 6.2 L V8	4	(Australia) Stephen Grove	P
(Germany) Herberth Motorsport	Porsche 911 GT3 R (992)	Porsche M97/80 4.2 L Flat-6	7	(Germany) Ralf Bohn	PA
(Germany) Herberth Motorsport	Porsche 911 GT3 R (992)	Porsche M97/80 4.2 L Flat-6	7	(Germany) Alfred Renauer	PA
(Germany) Herberth Motorsport	Porsche 911 GT3 R (992)	Porsche M97/80 4.2 L Flat-6	7	(Germany) Robert Renauer	PA
(United Kingdom) Garage 59	McLaren 720S GT3 Evo	McLaren M840T 4.0 L Turbo V8	8	(Italy) Marco Pulcini	Am
(United Kingdom) Garage 59	McLaren 720S GT3 Evo	McLaren M840T 4.0 L Turbo V8	8	(United Kingdom) Mark Sansom	Am
(United Kingdom) Garage 59	McLaren 720S GT3 Evo	McLaren M840T 4.0 L Turbo V8	8	(United Kingdom) James Vowles	Am
(United Kingdom) Garage 59	McLaren 720S GT3 Evo	McLaren M840T 4.0 L Turbo V8	8	(Sweden) Alexander West	Am
(Germany) Capital RT by Motopark	Mercedes-AMG GT3 Evo	Mercedes-AMG M159 6.2 L V8	13	Mikhail Aleshin	P
(Germany) Capital RT by Motopark	Mercedes-AMG GT3 Evo	Mercedes-AMG M159 6.2 L V8	13	(United Kingdom) Adam Christodoulou	P
(Germany) Capital RT by Motopark	Mercedes-AMG GT3 Evo	Mercedes-AMG M159 6.2 L V8	13	Denis Remenyako	P
(Austria) razoon-more than racing	Porsche 911 GT3 R (992)	Porsche M97/80 4.2 L Flat-6	14	(Denmark) Simon Birch	PA
(Austria) razoon-more than racing	Porsche 911 GT3 R (992)	Porsche M97/80 4.2 L Flat-6	14	(Netherlands) Niels Koolen	PA
(Austria) razoon-more than racing	Porsche 911 GT3 R (992)	Porsche M97/80 4.2 L Flat-6	14	(Netherlands) Thierry Vermeulen	PA
(Austria) razoon-more than racing	Porsche 911 GT3 R (992)	Porsche M97/80 4.2 L Flat-6	14	(Australia) Richard Wolf	PA
(United States) Winward Racing	Mercedes-AMG GT3 Evo	Mercedes-AMG M159 6.2 L V8	16	(Netherlands) "Daan Arrow"	P
(United States) Winward Racing	Mercedes-AMG GT3 Evo	Mercedes-AMG M159 6.2 L V8	16	(Germany) Maro Engel	P
(United States) Winward Racing	Mercedes-AMG GT3 Evo	Mercedes-AMG M159 6.2 L V8	16	Sergey Stolyarov	P
(United States) Winward Racing	Mercedes-AMG GT3 Evo	Mercedes-AMG M159 6.2 L V8	81	(Germany) Marvin Dienst	P
(United States) Winward Racing	Mercedes-AMG GT3 Evo	Mercedes-AMG M159 6.2 L V8	81	(Italy) Gabriele Piana	P
(United States) Winward Racing	Mercedes-AMG GT3 Evo	Mercedes-AMG M159 6.2 L V8	81	Rinat Salikhov	P
(Italy) Enrico Fulgenzi Racing	Porsche 911 GT3 R (992)	Porsche M97/80 4.2 L Flat-6	17	(United Arab Emirates) Alessandro Giannone	PA
(Italy) Enrico Fulgenzi Racing	Porsche 911 GT3 R (992)	Porsche M97/80 4.2 L Flat-6	17	(Italy) Andrea Girondi	PA
(Italy) Enrico Fulgenzi Racing	Porsche 911 GT3 R (992)	Porsche M97/80 4.2 L Flat-6	17	(Italy) Enrico Fulgenzi	PA
(Italy) Pellin Racing	Ferrari 296 GT3	Ferrari F163CE 3.0 L Turbo V6	27	(United States) Lisa Clark	PA
(Italy) Pellin Racing	Ferrari 296 GT3	Ferrari F163CE 3.0 L Turbo V6	27	(Canada) Kyle Marcelli	PA
(Italy) Pellin Racing	Ferrari 296 GT3	Ferrari F163CE 3.0 L Turbo V6	27	(Canada) Marc Muzzo	PA
(Italy) Pellin Racing	Ferrari 296 GT3	Ferrari F163CE 3.0 L Turbo V6	27	(United States) Jeff Westphal	PA
(France) TFT Racing	Mercedes-AMG GT3 Evo	Mercedes-AMG M159 6.2 L V8	28	(Germany) Nico Bastian	P
(France) TFT Racing	Mercedes-AMG GT3 Evo	Mercedes-AMG M159 6.2 L V8	28	(France) Jordan Boisson	P
(France) TFT Racing	Mercedes-AMG GT3 Evo	Mercedes-AMG M159 6.2 L V8	28	(France) Patrick Charlaix	P
(France) TFT Racing	Mercedes-AMG GT3 Evo	Mercedes-AMG M159 6.2 L V8	28	(Belgium) Benjamin Paque	P
(Australia) Geyer Valmont Racing/Tigani Motors	Mercedes-AMG GT3 Evo	Mercedes-AMG M159 6.2 L V8	44	(New Zealand) Brendon Leitch	PA
(Australia) Geyer Valmont Racing/Tigani Motors	Mercedes-AMG GT3 Evo	Mercedes-AMG M159 6.2 L V8	44	(Australia) Jayden Ojeda	PA
(Australia) Geyer Valmont Racing/Tigani Motors	Mercedes-AMG GT3 Evo	Mercedes-AMG M159 6.2 L V8	44	(Australia) Sergio Pires	PA
(Australia) Geyer Valmont Racing/Tigani Motors	Mercedes-AMG GT3 Evo	Mercedes-AMG M159 6.2 L V8	44	(Australia) Marcel Zalloua	PA
(Italy) MP Racing	Mercedes-AMG GT3 Evo	Mercedes-AMG M159 6.2 L V8	58	(Italy) Corinna Gostner	Am
(Italy) MP Racing	Mercedes-AMG GT3 Evo	Mercedes-AMG M159 6.2 L V8	58	(Italy) David Gostner	Am
(Italy) MP Racing	Mercedes-AMG GT3 Evo	Mercedes-AMG M159 6.2 L V8	58	(Italy) Manuela Gostner	Am
(Italy) MP Racing	Mercedes-AMG GT3 Evo	Mercedes-AMG M159 6.2 L V8	58	(Italy) Thomas Gostner	Am
(United Kingdom) Optimum Motorsport	McLaren 720S GT3 Evo	McLaren M840T 4.0 L Turbo V8	69	(United Kingdom) Ben Barnicoat	P
(United Kingdom) Optimum Motorsport	McLaren 720S GT3 Evo	McLaren M840T 4.0 L Turbo V8	69	(United States) Todd Coleman	P
(United Kingdom) Optimum Motorsport	McLaren 720S GT3 Evo	McLaren M840T 4.0 L Turbo V8	69	(United States) Aaron Telitz	P
(United Kingdom) Inception Racing	Ferrari 296 GT3	Ferrari F163CE 3.0 L Turbo V6	70	(United States) Brendan Iribe	P
(United Kingdom) Inception Racing	Ferrari 296 GT3	Ferrari F163CE 3.0 L Turbo V6	70	(United Kingdom) Ollie Millroy	P
(United Kingdom) Inception Racing	Ferrari 296 GT3	Ferrari F163CE 3.0 L Turbo V6	70	(Denmark) Frederik Schandorff	P
(Oman) AlManar by Dragon Racing	Ferrari 296 GT3	Ferrari F163CE 3.0 L Turbo V6	77	(Oman) Al Faisal Al Zubair	P
(Oman) AlManar by Dragon Racing	Ferrari 296 GT3	Ferrari F163CE 3.0 L Turbo V6	77	(United Kingdom) Chris Froggatt	P
(Oman) AlManar by Dragon Racing	Ferrari 296 GT3	Ferrari F163CE 3.0 L Turbo V6	77	(United Kingdom) Ben Tuck	P
(United Arab Emirates) DFYNE by Dragon Racing	Ferrari 296 GT3	Ferrari F163CE 3.0 L Turbo V6	88	(Italy) Giacomo Altoè	PA
(United Arab Emirates) DFYNE by Dragon Racing	Ferrari 296 GT3	Ferrari F163CE 3.0 L Turbo V6	88	(Italy) Giovanni Altoè	PA
(United Arab Emirates) DFYNE by Dragon Racing	Ferrari 296 GT3	Ferrari F163CE 3.0 L Turbo V6	88	(United Kingdom) Oscar Ryndziewicz	PA
(San Marino) Tsunami RT	Porsche 911 GT3 R (992)	Porsche M97/80 4.2 L Flat-6	79	(Italy) Fabio Babini	PA
(San Marino) Tsunami RT	Porsche 911 GT3 R (992)	Porsche M97/80 4.2 L Flat-6	79	(New Zealand) Daniel Gaunt	PA
(San Marino) Tsunami RT	Porsche 911 GT3 R (992)	Porsche M97/80 4.2 L Flat-6	79	(Italy) Davide Scannicchio	PA
(San Marino) Tsunami RT	Porsche 911 GT3 R (992)	Porsche M97/80 4.2 L Flat-6	79	(Italy) Johannes Zelger	PA

Icon	Class
P	Pro Cup
PA	Pro-Am Cup
Am	Am Cup

== Qualifying ==
=== Qualifying results ===
Fastest times for each car are denoted in bold.
Pole positions in each class are denoted in bold.

Pos.	Class	No.	Team	Car	Avg. Time	Driver 1	Driver 2	Driver 3	Driver 4
1	P	**70**	**(United Kingdom) Inception Racing**	**Ferrari 296 GT3**	**1:52.641**	**1:52.371**	1:52.450	1:53.102	
2	P	77	(Oman) AlManar by Dragon Racing	Ferrari 296 GT3	1:52.720	**1:52.053**	1:53.014	1:53.095	
3	P	81	(United States) Winward Racing	Mercedes-AMG GT3 Evo	1:53.863	1:53.408	**1:52.515**	1:52.667	
4	P	16	(United States) Winward Racing	Mercedes-AMG GT3 Evo	1:53.164	**1:51.923**	1:52.862	1:54.679	
5	P	13	(Germany) Capital RT by Motopark	Mercedes-AMG GT3 Evo	1:53.361	**1:52.916**	1:52.919	1:54.248	
6	P	69	(United Kingdom) Optimum Motorsport	McLaren 720S GT3 Evo	1:53.401	**1:52.256**	1:52.479	1:55.470	
7	PA	**44**	**(Australia) Geyer Valmont Racing/Tigani Motors**	**Mercedes-AMG GT3 Evo**	**1:53.626**	1:54.364	**1:51.921**	1:52.520	1:55.699
8	P	2	(South Africa) Into Africa Racing by HAAS RT	Audi R8 LMS Evo II	1:53.775	**1:52.079**	1:53.140	1:56.106	
9	P	4	(Australia) Grove Racing with GetSpeed	Mercedes-AMG GT3 Evo	1:53.884	**1:51.664**	1:53.671	1:56.319	
10	P	7	(Germany) Herberth Motorsport	Porsche 911 GT3 R (992)	1:54.075	**1:53.526**	1:53.729	1:54.970	
11	PA	88	(United Arab Emirates) DFYNE by Dragon Racing	Ferrari 296 GT3	1:54.091	**1:52.259**	1:54.320	1:55.696	
12	PA	14	(Austria) razoon-more than racing	Porsche 911 GT3 R (992)	1:54.215	1:52.928	**1:52.820**	1:55.912	1:55.200
13	Am	**8**	**(United Kingdom) Garage 59**	**McLaren 720S GT3 Evo**	**1:54.543**	**1:53.718**	1:54.389	1:55.055	1:55.011
14	PA	17	(Italy) Enrico Fulgenzi Racing	Porsche 911 GT3 R (992)	1:54.845	**1:53.890**	1:55.134	1:55.511	
15	PA	79	(San Marino) Tsunami RT	Porsche 911 GT3 R (992)	1:55.093	**1:52.996**	1:53.944	1:55.965	1:57.468
16	PA	21	(Antigua and Barbuda) HAAS RT	Audi R8 LMS Evo II	1:55.131	**1:52.973**	1:56.004	1:56.418	
17	PA	28	(France) TFT Racing	Mercedes-AMG GT3 Evo	1:54.486	2:01.532	**1:52.502**	1:55.480	1:53.150
18	PA	27	(Italy) Pellin Racing	Ferrari 296 GT3	1:56.926	**1:53.970**	1:54.023	1:57.250	2:02.464
19	PA	3	(Germany) Car Collection Motorsport	Porsche 911 GT3 R (992)	1:57.933	**1:53.650**	1:56.361	1:59.263	2:02.460
20	Am	58	(Italy) MP Racing	Mercedes-AMG GT3 Evo	1:58.064	**1:54.843**	1:57.586	1:58.569	2:01.160

== Race ==
The race was won by the No. 13 Capital RT by Motopark Mercedes driven by Mikhail Aleshin, Adam Christodoulou and Denis Remenyako.

=== Race results ===
==== Part 1 ====
Class winners denoted in bold.

Pos.	Class	No.	Team	Drivers	Car	Laps	Time/Retired
1	P	**77**	**(Oman) AlManar by Dragon Racing**	**(Oman) Al Faisal Al Zubair** **(United Kingdom) Chris Froggatt** **(United Kingdom) Ben Tuck**	**Ferrari 296 GT3**	**223**	**8:01:07.724**
2	P	81	(United States) Winward Racing	(Germany) Marvin Dienst (Italy) Gabriele Piana; Rinat Salikhov	Mercedes-AMG GT3 Evo	223	+12.931
3	P	13	(Germany) Capital RT by Motopark	Mikhail Aleshin (United Kingdom) Adam Christodoulou; Denis Remenyako	Mercedes-AMG GT3 Evo	223	+50.336
4	P	4	(Australia) Grove Racing with GetSpeed	(Andorra) Jules Gounon (Australia) Brenton Grove (Australia) Stephen Grove	Mercedes-AMG GT3 Evo	222	+1 Lap
5	P	69	(United Kingdom) Optimum Motorsport	(United Kingdom) Ben Barnicoat (United States) Todd Coleman (United States) Aaron Telitz	McLaren 720S GT3 Evo	222	+1 Lap
6	PA	**79**	**(San Marino) Tsunami RT**	**(Italy) Fabio Babini** **(New Zealand) Daniel Gaunt** **(Italy) Davide Scannicchio** **(Italy) Johannes Zelger**	**Porsche 911 GT3 R (992)**	**221**	**+2 Laps**
7	PA	44	(Australia) Geyer Valmont Racing/Tigani Motors	(New Zealand) Brendon Leitch (Australia) Jayden Ojeda (Australia) Sergio Pires (Australia) Marcel Zalloua	Mercedes-AMG GT3 Evo	220	+3 Laps
8	PA	28	(France) TFT Racing	(Germany) Nico Bastian (France) Jordan Boisson (France) Patrick Charlaix (Belgium) Benjamin Paque	Mercedes-AMG GT3 Evo	219	+4 Laps
9	PA	17	(Italy) Enrico Fulgenzi Racing	(United Arab Emirates) Alessandro Giannone (Italy) Andrea Girondi (Italy) Enrico Fulgenzi	Porsche 911 GT3 R (992)	219	+4 Laps
10	Am	**8**	**(United Kingdom) Garage 59**	**(Italy) Marco Pulcini** **(United Kingdom) Mark Sansom** **(United Kingdom) James Vowles** **(Sweden) Alexander West**	**McLaren 720S GT3 Evo**	**219**	**+4 Laps**
11	PA	21	(Antigua and Barbuda) HAAS RT	(Belgium) Simon Balcaen (Belgium) Peter Guelinckx (France) Steven Palette	Audi R8 LMS Evo II	218	+5 Laps
12	PA	3	(Germany) Car Collection Motorsport	Aleksey Denisov; Victor Plekhanov (United Arab Emirates) August Raber; Damir Saitov	Porsche 911 GT3 R (992)	218	+5 Laps
13	P	2	(South Africa) Into Africa Racing by HAAS RT	(Zimbabwe) Axcil Jefferies (South Africa) Xolile Letlaka (South Africa) Stuart White	Audi R8 LMS Evo II	218	+5 Laps
14	PA	14	(Austria) razoon-more than racing	(Denmark) Simon Birch (Netherlands) Niels Koolen (Netherlands) Thierry Vermeulen (Australia) Richard Wolf	Porsche 911 GT3 R (992)	217	+6 Laps
15	PA	27	(Italy) Pellin Racing	(United States) Lisa Clark (Canada) Kyle Marcelli (Canada) Marc Muzzo (United States) Jeff Westphal	Ferrari 296 GT3	212	+11 Laps
16	PA	88	(United Arab Emirates) DFYNE by Dragon Racing	(Italy) Giacomo Altoè (Italy) Giovanni Altoè (United Kingdom) Oscar Ryndziewicz	Ferrari 296 GT3	209	+14 Laps
17	P	70	(United Kingdom) Inception Racing	(United States) Brendan Iribe (United Kingdom) Ollie Millroy (Denmark) Frederik Schandorff	Ferrari 296 GT3	147	Contact
18	Am	58	(Italy) MP Racing	(Italy) Corinna Gostner (Italy) David Gostner (Italy) Manuela Gostner (Italy) Thomas Gostner	Mercedes-AMG GT3 Evo	55	Did not finish
19	P	16	(United States) Winward Racing	(Netherlands) "Daan Arrow" (Germany) Maro Engel; Sergey Stolyarov	Mercedes-AMG GT3 Evo	31	Did not finish
20	P	7	(Germany) Herberth Motorsport	(Germany) Ralf Bohn (Germany) Alfred Renauer (Germany) Robert Renauer	Porsche 911 GT3 R (992)	25	Did not finish

==== Part 2 ====
Class winners denoted in bold.

Pos.	Class	No.	Team	Drivers	Car	Laps	Time/Retired
1	P	**13**	**(Germany) Capital RT by Motopark**	**Mikhail Aleshin** **(United Kingdom) Adam Christodoulou**; **Denis Remenyako**	**Mercedes-AMG GT3 Evo**	**346**	**4:01:49.629**
2	P	77	(Oman) AlManar by Dragon Racing	(Oman) Al Faisal Al Zubair (United Kingdom) Chris Froggatt (United Kingdom) Ben Tuck	Ferrari 296 GT3	346	+1:32.190
3	P	4	(Australia) Grove Racing with GetSpeed	(Andorra) Jules Gounon (Australia) Brenton Grove (Australia) Stephen Grove	Mercedes-AMG GT3 Evo	345	+1 Lap
4	P	69	(United Kingdom) Optimum Motorsport	(United Kingdom) Ben Barnicoat (United States) Todd Coleman (United States) Aaron Telitz	McLaren 720S GT3 Evo	345	+1 Lap
5	P	81	(United States) Winward Racing	(Germany) Marvin Dienst (Italy) Gabriele Piana; Rinat Salikhov	Mercedes-AMG GT3 Evo	343	+3 Laps
6	PA	**44**	**(Australia) Geyer Valmont Racing/Tigani Motors**	**(New Zealand) Brendon Leitch** **(Australia) Jayden Ojeda** **(Australia) Sergio Pires** **(Australia) Marcel Zalloua**	**Mercedes-AMG GT3 Evo**	**341**	**+5 Laps**
7	PA	17	(Italy) Enrico Fulgenzi Racing	(United Arab Emirates) Alessandro Giannone (Italy) Andrea Girondi (Italy) Enrico Fulgenzi	Porsche 911 GT3 R (992)	341	+5 Laps
8	PA	21	(Antigua and Barbuda) HAAS RT	(Belgium) Simon Balcaen (Belgium) Peter Guelinckx (France) Steven Palette	Audi R8 LMS Evo II	341	+5 Laps
9	PA	28	(France) TFT Racing	(Germany) Nico Bastian (France) Jordan Boisson (France) Patrick Charlaix (Belgium) Benjamin Paque	Mercedes-AMG GT3 Evo	340	+6 Laps
10	Am	**8**	**(United Kingdom) Garage 59**	**(Italy) Marco Pulcini** **(United Kingdom) Mark Sansom** **(United Kingdom) James Vowles** **(Sweden) Alexander West**	**McLaren 720S GT3 Evo**	**340**	**+6 Laps**
11	PA	14	(Austria) razoon-more than racing	(Denmark) Simon Birch (Netherlands) Niels Koolen (Netherlands) Thierry Vermeulen (Australia) Richard Wolf	Porsche 911 GT3 R (992)	338	+8 Laps
12	PA	3	(Germany) Car Collection Motorsport	Aleksey Denisov; Victor Plekhanov (United Arab Emirates) August Raber; Damir Saitov	Porsche 911 GT3 R (992)	337	+9 Laps
13	PA	27	(Italy) Pellin Racing	(United States) Lisa Clark (Canada) Kyle Marcelli (Canada) Marc Muzzo (United States) Jeff Westphal	Ferrari 296 GT3	331	+15 Laps
14	P	2	(South Africa) Into Africa Racing by HAAS RT	(Zimbabwe) Axcil Jefferies (South Africa) Xolile Letlaka (South Africa) Stuart White	Audi R8 LMS Evo II	330	+16 Laps
15	PA	79	(San Marino) Tsunami RT	(Italy) Fabio Babini (New Zealand) Daniel Gaunt (Italy) Davide Scannicchio (Italy) Johannes Zelger	Porsche 911 GT3 R (992)	293	+53 Laps
16	PA	88	(United Arab Emirates) DFYNE by Dragon Racing	(Italy) Giacomo Altoè (Italy) Giovanni Altoè (United Kingdom) Oscar Ryndziewicz	Ferrari 296 GT3	250	+96 Laps
17	P	70	(United Kingdom) Inception Racing	(United States) Brendan Iribe (United Kingdom) Ollie Millroy (Denmark) Frederik Schandorff	Ferrari 296 GT3	147	Contact
18	Am	58	(Italy) MP Racing	(Italy) Corinna Gostner (Italy) David Gostner (Italy) Manuela Gostner (Italy) Thomas Gostner	Mercedes-AMG GT3 Evo	55	Did not finish
19	P	16	(United States) Winward Racing	(Netherlands) "Daan Arrow" (Germany) Maro Engel; Sergey Stolyarov	Mercedes-AMG GT3 Evo	31	Did not finish
20	P	7	(Germany) Herberth Motorsport	(Germany) Ralf Bohn (Germany) Alfred Renauer (Germany) Robert Renauer	Porsche 911 GT3 R (992)	25	Did not finish
