= 2021 Ligier European Series =

Motorsport event

The 2021 Ligier European Series was the second season of the Ligier European Series. The six-event season began at Circuit de Barcelona-Catalunya on 16 April, and finished at Algarve International Circuit on 23 October.

== Calendar ==
The calendar was revealed on October 29, 2020, and it saw the first Paul Ricard Heat be replaced by the Barcelona and Red Bull Ring Heats, expanding the calendar to six rounds:

| Round | Race | Circuit | Date |
|---|---|---|---|
| 1 | Barcelona Heat | (Spain) Circuit de Barcelona-Catalunya | 16–17 April |
| 2 | Red Bull Ring Heat | (Austria) Red Bull Ring | 14–15 May |
| 3 | Le Castellet Heat | (France) Circuit Paul Ricard | 4–5 June |
| 4 | Monza Heat | (Italy) Autodromo Nazionale di Monza | 9–10 July |
| 5 | Spa-Francorchamps Heat | (Belgium) Circuit de Spa-Francorchamps | 17–18 September |
| 6 | Portimao Heat | (Portugal) Algarve International Circuit | 22–23 October |

== Entries ==
=== Teams and drivers ===
| Team | Car | No. | Drivers | Rounds |
JS P4
| (Italy) HP Racing by Monzagarage | Ligier JS P4 | 22 | (Italy) Nicola Neri | 6 |
| (Italy) HP Racing by Monzagarage | Ligier JS P4 | 22 | (Italy) Simone Riccitelli | 6 |
| (Italy) HP Racing by Monzagarage | Ligier JS P4 | 23 | (Italy) Alessandro Cicognani | All |
| (Italy) HP Racing by Monzagarage | Ligier JS P4 | 23 | (Italy) Jacopo Faccioni | All |
| (United Kingdom) 24-7 Motorsport | Ligier JS P4 | 27 | (United Kingdom) Andrew Ferguson | 4–5 |
| (United Kingdom) 24-7 Motorsport | Ligier JS P4 | 27 | (United Kingdom) Jeremy Ferguson | 4–5 |
| (France) Les Deux Arbres | Ligier JS P4 | 32 | (Switzerland) Patrick Zacchia | 4 |
| (France) Les Deux Arbres | Ligier JS P4 | 32 | (Switzerland) Steve Zacchia | 4 |
| (France) Les Deux Arbres | Ligier JS P4 | 33 | (France) Jacques Nicolet | All |
| (France) Les Deux Arbres | Ligier JS P4 | 33 | (France) Pierre Nicolet | 1 |
| (France) Les Deux Arbres | Ligier JS P4 | 33 | (France) Pierre Fillon | 5 |
| (France) Les Deux Arbres | Ligier JS P4 | 34 | (Switzerland) Steve Zacchia | 1, 6 |
| (France) Les Deux Arbres | Ligier JS P4 | 34 | (France) Antoine Lepesqueux | 1 |
| (France) Les Deux Arbres | Ligier JS P4 | 34 | (France) Patrice Lafargue | 2, 4 |
| (France) Les Deux Arbres | Ligier JS P4 | 34 | (France) Nelson | 3, 5 |
| (France) Les Deux Arbres | Ligier JS P4 | 34 | (France) Dimitri Enjalbert | 4 |
| (France) Les Deux Arbres | Ligier JS P4 | 34 | (Belgium) Tom Cloet | 6 |
JS2 R
| (Switzerland) Cool Racing | Ligier JS2 R | 4 | (Spain) Cédric Oltramare | All |
| (Switzerland) Cool Racing | Ligier JS2 R | 13 | (United States) Maurice Smith | 2 |
| (Russia) Arctic Energy | Ligier JS2 R | 17 | (Lithuania) Egidijus Gutaravicius | 1, 4–6 |
| (Russia) Arctic Energy | Ligier JS2 R | 17 | (Lithuania) Pavilas Jankavicius | 1–3 |
| (Russia) Arctic Energy | Ligier JS2 R | 17 | (Russia) Sergey Egorov | 2–4 |
| (France) Orhes Racing | Ligier JS2 R | 24 | (France) Mathieu Martins | All |
| (France) Orhes Racing | Ligier JS2 R | 24 | (France) Olivier Pernaut | All |
| (France) Orhes Racing | Ligier JS2 R | 25 | (France) Alain Bucher | All |
| (France) Orhes Racing | Ligier JS2 R | 25 | (France) Arnaud Tsamere-Tsedri | 1 |
| (France) Orhes Racing | Ligier JS2 R | 25 | (France) Julien Febreau | 2 |
| (France) Orhes Racing | Ligier JS2 R | 25 | (Norway) Ayla Ågren | 3, 5 |
| (France) Orhes Racing | Ligier JS2 R | 25 | (Italy) Paolo Collivadino | 4 |
| (France) Orhes Racing | Ligier JS2 R | 25 | (United Kingdom) Nicholas Adcock | 6 |
| (France) M Racing | Ligier JS2 R | 53 | (France) Natan Bihel | All |
| (France) M Racing | Ligier JS2 R | 69 | (France) Laurent Millara | All |
| (France) CTF Performance | Ligier JS2 R | 95 | (France) Nicolas Beraud | 1–5 |
| (France) CTF Performance | Ligier JS2 R | 95 | (France) Fabien Delaplace | 1, 3–5 |
| (France) CTF Performance | Ligier JS2 R | 95 | (France) Gilles Poret | 2 |
EntryLists:

== Results ==
Bold indicates overall winner.

| Rnd. | | Circuit | JS P4 Winning Team | JS2 R Winning Team |
| Rnd. | | Circuit | JS P4 Winning Drivers | JS2 R Winning Drivers |
|---|---|---|---|---|
| 1 | R1 | (Spain) Circuit de Barcelona-Catalunya | **(France) No. 34 Les Deux Arbres** | (France) No. 53 M Racing |
| 1 | R1 | (Spain) Circuit de Barcelona-Catalunya | **(France) Antoine Lepesqueux** **(Switzerland) Steve Zacchia** | (France) Natan Bihel |
| 1 | R2 | (Spain) Circuit de Barcelona-Catalunya | **(Italy) No. 23 HPRacing by Monzagarage** | (France) No. 53 M Racing |
| 1 | R2 | (Spain) Circuit de Barcelona-Catalunya | **(Italy) Jacopo Faccioni** **(Italy) Alessandro Cicognani** | (France) Natan Bihel |
| 2 | R1 | (Austria) Red Bull Ring | (Italy) No. 23 HPRacing by Monzagarage | **(France) No. 53 M Racing** |
| 2 | R1 | (Austria) Red Bull Ring | (Italy) Jacopo Faccioni (Italy) Alessandro Cicognani | **(France) Natan Bihel** |
| 2 | R2 | (Austria) Red Bull Ring | **(France) No. 34 Les Deux Arbres** | (France) No. 24 Orhes Racing |
| 2 | R2 | (Austria) Red Bull Ring | **(France) Patrice Lafargue** | (France) Mathieu Martins (France) Olivier Pernaut |
| 3 | R1 | (France) Circuit Paul Ricard | **(Italy) No. 23 HPRacing by Monzagarage** | (France) No. 24 Orhes Racing |
| 3 | R1 | (France) Circuit Paul Ricard | **(Italy) Jacopo Faccioni** **(Italy) Alessandro Cicognani** | (France) Mathieu Martins (France) Olivier Pernaut |
| 3 | R2 | (France) Circuit Paul Ricard | **(Italy) No. 23 HPRacing by Monzagarage** | (France) No. 53 M Racing |
| 3 | R2 | (France) Circuit Paul Ricard | **(Italy) Jacopo Faccioni** **(Italy) Alessandro Cicognani** | (France) Natan Bihel |
| 4 | R1 | (Italy) Autodromo Nazionale di Monza | **(France) No. 34 Les Deux Arbres** | (France) No. 53 M Racing |
| 4 | R1 | (Italy) Autodromo Nazionale di Monza | **(France) Patrice Lafargue** **(France) Dimitri Enjalbert** | (France) Natan Bihel |
| 4 | R2 | (Italy) Autodromo Nazionale di Monza | **(Italy) No. 23 HPRacing by Monzagarage** | (France) No. 24 Orhes Racing |
| 4 | R2 | (Italy) Autodromo Nazionale di Monza | **(Italy) Jacopo Faccioni** **(Italy) Alessandro Cicognani** | (France) Mathieu Martins (France) Olivier Pernaut |
| 5 | R1 | (Belgium) Circuit de Spa-Francorchamps | **(Italy) No. 23 HPRacing by Monzagarage** | (France) No. 53 M Racing |
| 5 | R1 | (Belgium) Circuit de Spa-Francorchamps | **(Italy) Jacopo Faccioni** **(Italy) Alessandro Cicognani** | (France) Natan Bihel |
| 5 | R2 | (Belgium) Circuit de Spa-Francorchamps | **(Italy) No. 23 HPRacing by Monzagarage** | (France) No. 24 Orhes Racing |
| 5 | R2 | (Belgium) Circuit de Spa-Francorchamps | **(Italy) Jacopo Faccioni** **(Italy) Alessandro Cicognani** | (France) Mathieu Martins (France) Olivier Pernaut |
| 6 | R1 | (Portugal) Algarve International Circuit | **(France) No. 33 Les Deux Arbres** | (France) No. 24 Orhes Racing |
| 6 | R1 | (Portugal) Algarve International Circuit | **(France) Jacques Nicolet** | (France) Mathieu Martins (France) Olivier Pernaut |
| 6 | R2 | (Portugal) Algarve International Circuit | **(France) No. 34 Les Deux Arbres** | (France) No. 53 M Racing |
| 6 | R2 | (Portugal) Algarve International Circuit | **(Switzerland) Steve Zacchia** **(Belgium) Tom Cloet** | (France) Natan Bihel |

== Championships ==
=== JS P4 Drivers ===
| Pos. | Driver | Team | CAT (Spain) | | RBR (Austria) | | LEC (France) | | MNZ (Italy) | | SPA (Belgium) | | POR (Portugal) | | Points |
| Pos. | Driver | Team | R1 | R2 | R1 | R2 | R1 | R2 | R1 | R2 | R1 | R2 | R1 | R2 | Points |
|---|---|---|---|---|---|---|---|---|---|---|---|---|---|---|---|
| 1 | (Italy) Jacopo Faccioni (Italy) Alessandro Cicognani | (Italy) HP Racing Team | 3 | 1 | 1 | 3 | 1 | 1 | 2 | 1 | 1 | 1 | Ret | Ret | 223 |
| 2 | (France) Jacques Nicolet | (France) Les Deux Arbres | 2 | 2 | 2 | 2 | 3 | 2 | 4 | 2 | 3 | 3 | 1 | 2 | 205 |
| 3 | (Switzerland) Steve Zacchia | (France) Les Deux Arbres | 1 | 3 | | | | | 5 | 3 | | | Ret | 1 | 90 |
| 4 | (France) Patrice Lafargue | (France) Les Deux Arbres | | | 3 | 1 | | | 1 | 4 | | | | | 77 |
| 5 | (France) Nelson | (France) Les Deux Arbres | | | | | 2 | 3 | | | 2 | 2 | | | 69 |
| 6 | (France) Antoine Lepesqueux | (France) Les Deux Arbres | 1 | 3 | | | | | | | | | | | 40 |
| 7 | (United Kingdom) Andrew Ferguson (United Kingdom) Jeremy Ferguson | (United Kingdom) 24-7 Motorsport | | | | | | | 3 | DNS | 4 | 4 | | | 39 |
| 8 | (France) Dimitri Enjalbert | (France) Les Deux Arbres | | | | | | | 1 | 4 | | | | | 37 |
| 9 | (Italy) Nicola Neri (Italy) Simone Riccitelli | (Italy) HP Racing Team | | | | | | | | | | | 2 | 3 | 36 |
| 10 | (France) Pierre Fillon | (France) Les Deux Arbres | | | | | | | | | 3 | 3 | | | 30 |
| 11 | (Belgium) Tom Cloet | (France) Les Deux Arbres | | | | | | | | | | | Ret | 1 | 25 |
| 12 | (Switzerland) Patrick Zacchia | (France) Les Deux Arbres | | | | | | | 5 | 3 | | | | | 25 |
| – | (France) Pierre Nicolet | (France) Les Deux Arbres | WD | WD | | | | | | | | | | | – |
Standings:

=== JS2 R Drivers ===
| Pos. | Driver | Team | CAT (Spain) | | RBR (Austria) | | LEC (France) | | MNZ (Italy) | | SPA (Belgium) | | POR (Portugal) | | Points |
| Pos. | Driver | Team | R1 | R2 | R1 | R2 | R1 | R2 | R1 | R2 | R1 | R2 | R1 | R2 | Points |
|---|---|---|---|---|---|---|---|---|---|---|---|---|---|---|---|
| 1 | (France) Natan Bihel | (France) M Racing | 1 | 1 | 1 | 2 | 2 | 1 | 1 | 4 | 1 | 2 | 2 | 1 | 259 |
| 2 | (France) Mathieu Martins (France) Olivier Pernaut | (France) Orhes Racing | 3 | 2 | 2 | 1 | 1 | 4 | 2 | 1 | 6 | 1 | 1 | 2 | 232 |
| 3 | (France) Laurent Millara | (France) M Racing | 2 | 3 | 3 | 3 | 4 | 3 | 3 | 2 | 4 | 4 | 3 | 3 | 177 |
| 4 | (Spain) Cédric Oltramare | (Switzerland) Cool Racing | 6 | 4 | 8 | 5 | 3 | 2 | 6 | 3 | 2 | 3 | 4 | 4 | 147 |
| 5 | (France) Nicolas Beraud | (France) CTF Performance | 4 | 5 | 6 | 6 | 5 | 5 | 4 | 5 | 3 | Ret | | | 95 |
| 6 | (France) Fabien Delaplace | (France) CTF Performance | 4 | 5 | | | 5 | 5 | 4 | 5 | 3 | Ret | | | 79 |
| 7 | (France) Alain Bucher | (France) Orhes Racing | 7 | 6 | 4 | 7 | 6 | 6 | 7 | 6 | WD | WD | 6 | 6 | 78 |
| 8 | (Lithuania) Egidijus Gutaravicius | (Russia) Arctic Energy | 5 | 7 | | | | | 5 | 7 | 5 | 5 | 5 | 5 | 72 |
| 9 | (Lithuania) Pavilas Jankavicius | (Russia) Arctic Energy | 5 | 7 | 7 | 8 | 7 | 7 | | | | | | | 38 |
| 10 | (United States) Maurice Smith | (Switzerland) Cool Racing | | | 5 | 4 | | | | | | | | | 22 |
| 11 | (Russia) Sergey Egorov | (Russia) Arctic Energy | | | 7 | 8 | 7 | 7 | | | | | | | 22 |
| 12 | (France) Julien Febreau | (France) Orhes Racing | | | 4 | 7 | | | | | | | | | 18 |
| 13 | (France) Gilles Poret | (France) CTF Performance | | | 6 | 6 | | | | | | | | | 16 |
| 14 | (Norway) Ayla Ågren | (France) Orhes Racing | | | | | 6 | 6 | | | WD | WD | | | 16 |
| 15 | (United Kingdom) Nicholas Adcock | (France) Orhes Racing | | | | | | | | | | | 6 | 6 | 16 |
| 16 | (France) Arnaud Tsamere-Tsedri | (France) Orhes Racing | 7 | 6 | | | | | | | | | | | 14 |
| 17 | (Italy) Paolo Collivadino | (France) Orhes Racing | | | | | | | 7 | 6 | | | | | 14 |
Standings:

=== JS P4 Teams ===
| Pos. | Team | CAT (Spain) | | RBR (Austria) | | LEC (France) | | MNZ (Italy) | | SPA (Belgium) | | POR (Portugal) | | Points |
| Pos. | Team | R1 | R2 | R1 | R2 | R1 | R2 | R1 | R2 | R1 | R2 | R1 | R2 | Points |
|---|---|---|---|---|---|---|---|---|---|---|---|---|---|---|
| 1 | (Italy) #23 HPRacing by Monzagarage | 3 | 1 | 1 | 3 | 1 | 1 | 2 | 1 | 1 | 1 | Ret | Ret | 223 |
| 2 | (France) #34 Les Deux Arbres | 1 | 3 | 3 | 1 | 2 | 3 | 1 | 4 | 2 | 2 | Ret | 1 | 211 |
| 3 | (France) #33 Les Deux Arbres | 2 | 2 | 2 | 2 | 3 | 2 | 4 | 2 | 3 | 3 | 1 | 3 | 205 |
| 4 | (United Kingdom) #27 24-7 Motorsport | | | | | | | 3 | DNS | 4 | 4 | | | 39 |
| 5 | (Italy) #22 HPRacing by Monzagarage | | | | | | | | | | | 2 | 2 | 36 |
| 6 | (France) #32 Les Deux Arbres | | | | | | | 5 | 3 | | | | | 25 |
Standings:

=== JS2 R Teams ===
| Pos. | Team | CAT (Spain) | | RBR (Austria) | | LEC (France) | | MNZ (Italy) | | SPA (Belgium) | | POR (Portugal) | | Points |
| Pos. | Team | R1 | R2 | R1 | R2 | R1 | R2 | R1 | R2 | R1 | R2 | R1 | R2 | Points |
|---|---|---|---|---|---|---|---|---|---|---|---|---|---|---|
| 1 | (France) #53 M Racing | 1 | 1 | 1 | 2 | 2 | 1 | 1 | 4 | 1 | 2 | 2 | 1 | 259 |
| 2 | (France) #24 Orhes Racing | 3 | 2 | 2 | 1 | 1 | 4 | 2 | 1 | 6 | 1 | 1 | 2 | 232 |
| 3 | (France) #69 M Racing | 2 | 3 | 3 | 3 | 4 | 3 | 3 | 2 | 4 | 4 | 3 | 3 | 177 |
| 4 | (Switzerland) #4 Cool Racing | 6 | 4 | 8 | 5 | 3 | 2 | 6 | 3 | 2 | 3 | 4 | 4 | 147 |
| 5 | (France) #95 CTF Performance | 4 | 5 | 6 | 6 | 5 | 5 | 4 | 5 | 3 | Ret | | | 95 |
| 6 | (Russia) #17 Arctic Energy | 5 | 7 | 7 | 8 | 7 | 7 | 5 | 7 | 5 | 5 | 5 | 5 | 94 |
| 7 | (France) #25 Orhes Racing | 7 | 6 | 4 | 7 | 6 | 6 | 7 | 6 | WD | WD | 6 | 6 | 78 |
| 8 | (Switzerland) #13 Cool Racing | | | 5 | 4 | | | | | | | | | 22 |
Standings:
