= 2026 Road to Le Mans =

Automobile endurance event

Circuit des 24 Heures du Mans, mostly on public roads

The 11th Road to Le Mans was a sports car race held on Wednesday 10 and Friday 12 June 2026 at the Circuit des 24 Heures du Mans, Le Mans, France, before the 2026 24 Hours of Le Mans on the weekend.

The race, part of the Michelin Le Mans Cup, features LMP3 cars, split into the classes LMP3 and LMP3 Pro-Am, and grand tourer sports cars in the GT3 class. For the first time, this event featured a single, three-hour endurance race rather than a pair of sprint races.

== Entry list ==
Icon	Series
MLMC	Michelin Le Mans Cup
ELMS	European Le Mans Series
GTWC	SRO GT World Challenge
ALMS	Asian Le Mans Series
RLMS	Road to Le Mans only

No.	Entrant	Car	Series	Driver 1	Driver 2
LMP3 (26 entries)
2	(Germany) Rinaldi Racing	Ligier JS P325 - Toyota	ELMS	(Greece) Stylianos Kolovos	(United Arab Emirates) Alvise Rodella
4	(United Kingdom) Nielsen Racing	Duqueine D09 - Toyota	MLMC	(France) Jules Caranta	(South Africa) Mikaeel Pitamber
5	(France) 23Events Racing	Ligier JS P325 - Toyota	MLMC	(United Kingdom) Isaac Barashi	(Italy) Matteo Segre
6	(France) ANS Motorsport	Ligier JS P325 - Toyota	MLMC	(Spain) Mikkel Kristensen	(Brazil) Arthur Pavie
7	(United Kingdom) Nielsen Racing	Duqueine D09 - Toyota	MLMC	(United Kingdom) Alfie Briggs	(France) Gaël Julien
8	(Germany) BWT Mücke Motorsport	Duqueine D09 - Toyota	MLMC	(Poland) Maksymilian Angelard	(Germany) Mattis Pluschkell
9	(France) ANS Motorsport	Ligier JS P325 - Toyota	MLMC	(United Kingdom) Maxwell Dodds	(France) Louis Iglesias
12	(Spain) Brutal Fish Campos Racing	Ligier JS P325 - Toyota	MLMC	(Sweden) August Raber	(France) Arthur Rogeon
15	(United Kingdom) Vector Sport RLR	Ligier JS P325 - Toyota	MLMC	(Colombia) Gerónimo Gómez Azza	(Switzerland) Enea Frey
19	(Spain) Brutal Fish Campos Racing	Ligier JS P325 - Toyota	MLMC	(Spain) Lucas Fluxá	(Slovakia) Matúš Ryba
20	(Denmark) High Class Racing	Ligier JS P325 - Toyota	ALMS	(Denmark) Philip Lindberg	(Germany) Lenny Ried
22	(France) Trajectus Motorsport	Ligier JS P325 - Toyota	MLMC	(France) Mathis Poulet	(Portugal) André Vieira
26	(Czech Republic) Bretton Racing	Ligier JS P325 - Toyota	MLMC	(France) Augustin Bernier	(Australia) James Winslow
29	(France) Forestier Racing by VPS	Ligier JS P325 - Toyota	MLMC	(United States) Roee Meyuhas	(France) Luciano Morano
36	(India) Ajith RedAnt Racing	Ligier JS P325 - Toyota	ALMS	(India) Narain Karthikeyan	(India) Aditya Patel
42	(United Kingdom) Steller Motorsport	Duqueine D09 - Toyota	RLMS	(Zimbabwe) Ameerh Naran	(Brazil) Sérgio Sette Câmara
43	(Poland) Inter Europol Competition	Ligier JS P325 - Toyota	MLMC	(Denmark) Christian Dannemand Jørgensen	(Sweden) William Karlsson
50	(France) 23Events Racing	Ligier JS P325 - Toyota	MLMC	(Italy) Giovanni Maschio	(United States) Colin Queen
68	(France) M Racing	Ligier JS P325 - Toyota	ELMS	(United Kingdom) Haydn Chance	(Argentina) Nano López
70	(Poland) Team Virage	Ligier JS P325 - Toyota	MLMC	(United Kingdom) Jude Peters	(Belgium) Vic Stevens
85	(France) R-ace GP	Duqueine D09 - Toyota	MLMC	(Singapore) Danial Frost	(France) Enzo Peugeot
86	(France) R-ace GP	Duqueine D09 - Toyota	MLMC	(Switzerland) Léna Bühler	(New Zealand) Zack Scoular
87	(Switzerland) CLX Motorsport	Ligier JS P325 - Toyota	MLMC	(Brazil) Alexander Jacoby	(Switzerland) Kévin Rabin
92	(France) Forestier Racing by VPS	Ligier JS P325 - Toyota	MLMC	(Denmark) Sebastian Bach	(Brazil) Lucas Fecury
97	(Switzerland) CLX Motorsport	Ligier JS P325 - Toyota	MLMC	(Switzerland) David Droux	(Switzerland) Cédric Oltramare
99	(Netherlands) More Motorsport	Ligier JS P325 - Toyota	MLMC	(Netherlands) Tim Gerhards	(Netherlands) Max van der Snel
LMP3 Pro-Am (14 entries)
3	(Luxembourg) DKR Engineering	Ligier JS P325 - Toyota	ELMS	(France) Quentin Antonel	(Estonia) Antti Rammo
16	(India) Ajith RedAnt by Virage	Ligier JS P325 - Toyota	ALMS	(India) Ajith Kumar	(France) Romain Vozniak
24	(France) Racing Spirit of Léman	Ligier JS P325 - Toyota	MLMC	(Germany) Christian Gisy	(Denmark) Oskar Kristensen
28	(Poland) Team Virage	Ligier JS P325 - Toyota	ELMS	(Cyprus) Theo Micouris	(Hong Kong) Denise Yeung
34	(Poland) Inter Europol Competition	Ligier JS P325 - Toyota	MLMC	(United Arab Emirates) Alexander Bukhantsov (Note: Bukhantsov is Russian, but he competes under an Emirati licence as Russian national emblems were banned by the FIA following the Russian invasion of Ukraine.)	(United States) Shawn Rashid
35	(France) Ultimate	Ligier JS P325 - Toyota	ELMS	(France) Arlan Boulain	(France) Gilles Heriau
37	(Switzerland) CLX Motorsport	Ligier JS P325 - Toyota	ELMS	(Brazil) Bruno Ribeiro	(France) Louis Stern
49	(Denmark) High Class Racing	Ligier JS P325 - Toyota	MLMC	(Denmark) Michael Hove Jacobsen	(South Africa) Andrew Rackstraw
58	(Australia) GG Classics	Ligier JS P325 - Toyota	MLMC	(Australia) George Nakas	(Australia) Fraser Ross
62	(Czech Republic) Bretton Racing	Ligier JS P325 - Toyota	MLMC	(Algeria) Leo Robinson	(Poland) Jacek Zielonka
66	(Germany) Rinaldi Racing	Ligier JS P325 - Toyota	MLMC	(Germany) Steve Parrow	(Denmark) Mikkel Gaarde Pedersen
71	(Germany) Rinaldi Racing	Ligier JS P325 - Toyota	MLMC	(Germany) Stefan Aust	(Germany) Felipe Fernández Laser
78	(France) M Racing	Ligier JS P325 - Toyota	RLMS	(United Kingdom) Wayne Boyd	(United States) Daniel Goldburg
98	(Belgium) Motorsport98	Ligier JS P325 - Toyota	MLMC	(Belgium) Eric De Doncker	(France) Gillian Henrion
GT3 (18 entries)
10	(France) Racing Spirit of Léman	Aston Martin Vantage AMR GT3 Evo	MLMC	(France) Valentin Hasse-Clot	(Austria) Philipp Sager
11	(France) Code Racing Development	Aston Martin Vantage AMR GT3 Evo	MLMC	(Colombia) Sebastián Moreno	(Switzerland) Ethan Ischer
14	(Germany) GetSpeed Performance	Mercedes-AMG GT3 Evo	ALMS	(United States) Anthony Bartone	(Luxembourg) Steve Jans
17	(Switzerland) Kessel Racing	Ferrari 296 GT3 Evo	MLMC	(Italy) David Fumanelli	(Italy) Lorenzo Innocenti
21	(Switzerland) Kessel Racing	Ferrari 296 GT3 Evo	MLMC	(Italy) Giacomo Altoè	(United Kingdom) Oscar Ryndziewicz
23	(Spain) Biogas Motorsport	Ferrari 296 GT3 Evo	MLMC	(Spain) Josep Mayola	(Spain) Fran Rueda
45	(Denmark) High Class Racing	Porsche 911 GT3 R (992.2)	ELMS	(Germany) Max Moritz	(Netherlands) Morris Schuring
51	(Italy) AF Corse	Ferrari 296 GT3 Evo	MLMC	(Italy) Alessandro Cozzi	(Italy) Eliseo Donno
54	(Italy) Dinamic GT	Porsche 911 GT3 R (992.2)	MLMC	(Netherlands) Loek Hartog	(Canada) Reinhold Krahn
55	(Italy) AF Corse	Ferrari 296 GT3 Evo	RLMS	(Italy) Tommaso Mosca	(Puerto Rico) Francesco Piovanetti
72	(Belgium) Team WRT	BMW M4 GT3 Evo	GTWC	(France) Arnold Robin	(France) Maxime Robin
77	(Spain) SMC Motorsport	McLaren 720S GT3 Evo	MLMC	(Spain) Gonzalo de Andrés	(France) Jean-Baptiste Simmenauer
83	(Italy) AF Corse	Ferrari 296 GT3 Evo	RLMS	(United Kingdom) Charlie Fagg	(Japan) Norikazu Shibata
88	(Italy) AF Corse	Ferrari 296 GT3 Evo	MLMC	(United States) Rey Acosta III	(Italy) Marco Bonanomi
90	(United Kingdom) Blackthorn	Aston Martin Vantage AMR GT3 Evo	ALMS	(United Kingdom) Charles Bateman	(Belgium) Kobe Pauwels
91	(United Kingdom) Blackthorn	Aston Martin Vantage AMR GT3 Evo	MLMC	(Switzerland) Claude Bovet	(United Kingdom) Tom Canning
95	(United Kingdom) United Autosports	McLaren 720S GT3 Evo	ELMS	(United Kingdom) Michael Birch	(Australia) Garnet Patterson
96	(Germany) GetSpeed Team PCX Racing	Mercedes-AMG GT3 Evo	GTWC	(France) Patrick Charlaix	(France) Marvin Klein

== Qualifying ==
Provisional pole positions in each class are denoted in bold.

Final qualifying classification
Pos.	Class	No.	Team	Qualifying	Pole Shootout	Grid

== Race ==
=== Race result ===
Pos	Class	No.	Team	Drivers	Chassis	Tyre	Laps	Time/Reason

== See also ==
- 2026 24 Hours of Le Mans
