= George Washington Burnap =

American Unitarian clergyman

George Washington Burnap (November 30, 1802, in Merrimack, New Hampshire – September 8, 1859, in Baltimore) was a Unitarian clergyman of the United States.

== Biography ==
His father was a Congregational minister in Merrimack. His mother died when he was seven, and a sister took care of him. He graduated from Harvard College in 1824, and then studied for three years at Harvard Divinity School. His studies of the Bible in college convinced him to become a Unitarian. In 1828 he was ordained pastor of the First Independent Church in Baltimore, where Jared Sparks had preceded him, and which position he retained till his death. He married Nancy Williams in 1831. Without neglecting his pastoral duties, Burnap devoted much of his career to studies, mostly oriented toward explaining Unitarianism to the public and justifying its doctrines in the face of its critics. In 1849, he received the degree of D.D. from Harvard College.

He was the first person to write "The grand essentials to happiness in this life are something to do, something to love, and something to hope for." It appears in his Lectures on the Sphere and Duties of Woman. This quote is often misattributed to other writers, such as Immanuel Kant and Joseph Addison.

== Works ==
He was a voluminous writer, chiefly on theological and controversial subjects. His principal works are:

- Lectures on the Doctrines in Controversy between Unitarians and other Denominations of Christians (1835)
- Lectures on the History of Christianity (1842)
- Expository Lectures on the principal Texts of the Bible which relate to the Doctrine of the Trinity (1845)
- Life of Leonard Calvert in Jared Sparks' The Library of American Biography, Volume IX (1846)
- The Sphere and Duties of Woman: A Course of Lectures (1848)
- Lectures to Young Men on the Cultivation of the Mind, the Formation of Character, and the Conduct of Life (1848)
- Lectures on the Sphere and Duties of Woman (1849)
- Lectures on the Doctrines of Christianity (1850)
- Christianity, its Essence and Evidence (1855)

== Essentials of happiness quotation ==
Published in Burnap's The Sphere and Duties of Woman: A Course of Lectures (1848), Lecture IV: "The grand essentials of happiness in this life are: Something to do, something to love, and something to hope for."
