= Ligier JS P325 =

French sports car prototype

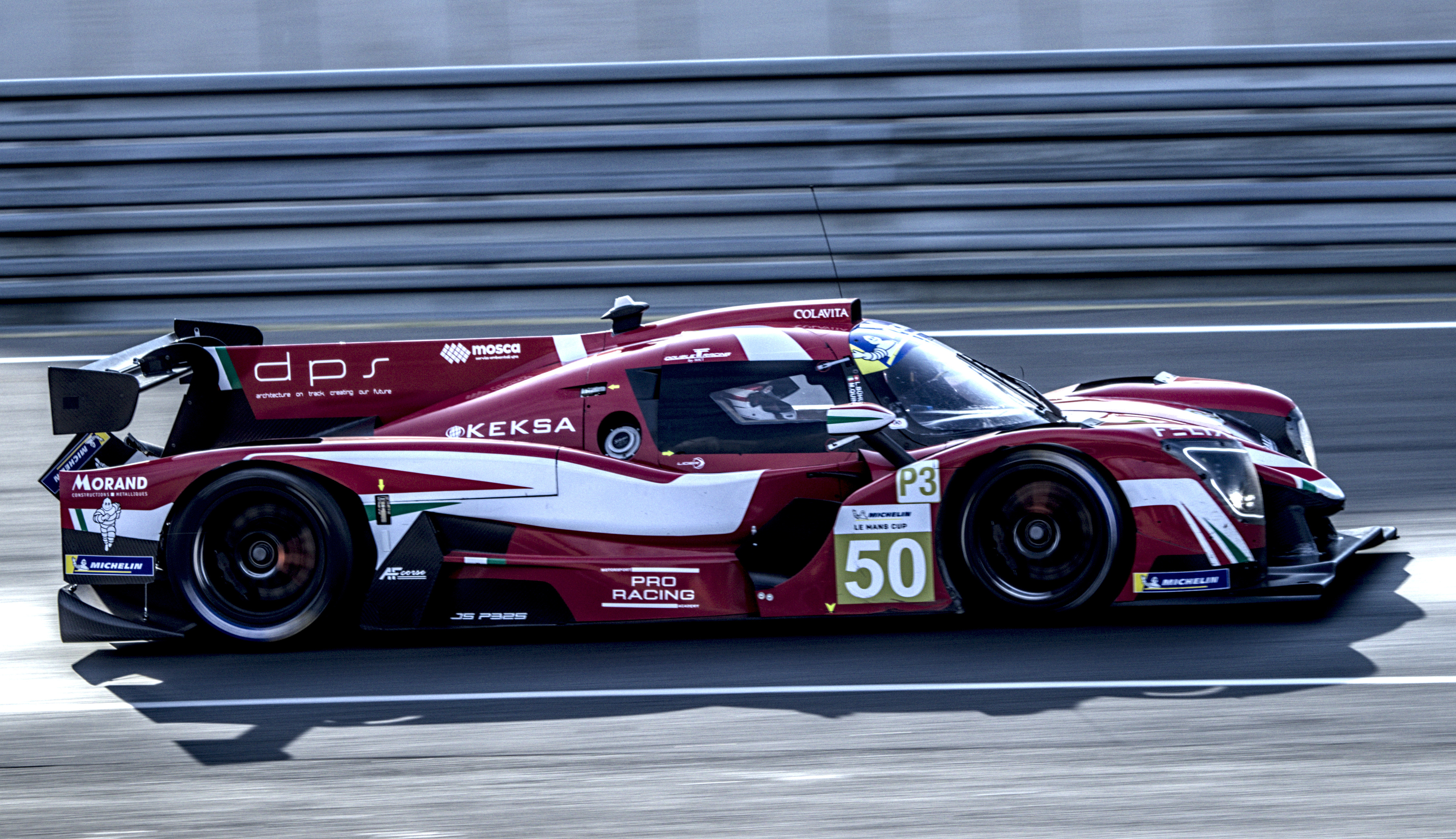
- The No. 50 JS P325 car of 23Events Racing that took the win during the 2025 Road to Le Mans.
- Category: LMP3
- Constructor: Ligier Automotive
- Designer: Nicolas Clémençon
- Predecessor: Ligier JS P320

Technical specifications
- Chassis: HP Composites carbon monocoque, Zylon side panels
- Suspension (front): Double wishbones, pushrods with power steering and spring-dampers combination 4-ways through-rod Öhlins TTX40 dampers Adjustable anti-roll bar system 3rd element front and rear
- Suspension (rear): Same as front
- Length: 4,605 mm (181.3 in)
- Width: 1,900 mm (75 in)
- Height: 1,180 mm (46 in)
- Wheelbase: 2,860 mm (113 in)
- Engine: Toyota V35A-FTS 3,445 cc (3.4 L; 210.2 cu in) 60° V6 twin-turbocharged
- Transmission: Xtrac P1152 6-speed sequential
- Power: 470 hp (477 PS; 350 kW)
- Lubricants: Elf
- Brakes: Brembo Six-piston callipers front and rear 14 in (360 mm) discs

Competition history
- Debut: 2025 Le Mans Cup Barcelona round
- First win: 2025 Le Mans Cup Barcelona round
- Last win: 2026 4 Hours of Imola
- Drivers' Championships: 3 (2025 LMC (Pro-Am), 2025 ELMS, 2025–26 Asian LMS)

The Ligier JS P325 is a Le Mans Prototype LMP3 race car designed, developed and built by French manufacturer Ligier to ACO 2025 3rd Generation Le Mans Prototype LMP3 regulations. The car is successor to the Ligier JS P320 and can be built from its predecessor. It is set to be eligible in ACO’s Le Mans Cup, European Le Mans Series championships in 2025 with the Asian Le Mans Series in the following year. 25 examples are expected to be built before the 2025 racing season.

== Developmental history ==
On July 7, 2024, the Automobile Club de I'Ouest formally announced that 2025 would be the first year of the third generation Le Mans Prototype 3 (LMP3) cars using the previously announced, Oreca-built, Toyota V35A V6 twin-turbocharged engines. All four previous constructors were retained for the new regulations. Upgrades to the car's cooling system were required due to the new twin-turbo engine. At the European Le Mans Series 4 Hours of Spa, Ligier was present to showcase the new car with changes to its front end to increase airflow to the rear.

Olivier Pla tested the car at Magny-Cours and Barcelona, completing around 400 km (250 mi) over six test days. Test results were positive overall, with the new cooling system working well, however there was an issue with downshifting that was discovered and fixed with help from Oreca.
