= 2025 Ultimate Cup European Series =

Edition of motorsport championship

The 2025 Ultimate Cup European Series was the seventh season of the Ultimate Cup European Series. It started at Circuit Paul Ricard on 28 March and finished at the same venue on 9 November. The Ultimate Cup Series is a program comprising multiple endurance and sprint championships across different classes of motor racing.

== Calendar ==
The 2025 calendar was announced on 11 October 2024. The series did not return to the Hockenheimring, instead opting to race at Motorland Aragón for the first time in its history. A pre-season test was also held on 27–28 February at Paul Ricard.

Round	Circuit	Date	Map of circuit locations
1	(France) Circuit Paul Ricard, Le Castellet	28–30 March	2025 Ultimate Cup European Series is located in Europe
2	(Italy) Mugello Circuit, Scarperia e San Piero	25–27 April	2025 Ultimate Cup European Series is located in Europe
3	(Portugal) Algarve International Circuit, Portimão	30 May–1 June	2025 Ultimate Cup European Series is located in Europe
4	(Spain) Motorland Aragón, Alcañiz	5–7 September	2025 Ultimate Cup European Series is located in Europe
5	(France) Circuit de Nevers Magny-Cours, Magny-Cours	10–12 October	2025 Ultimate Cup European Series is located in Europe
6	(France) Circuit Paul Ricard, Le Castellet	7–9 November	2025 Ultimate Cup European Series is located in Europe

== European Endurance Prototype Cup ==
The European Endurance Prototype Cup was only open to Nova Proto NP02 cars in 2025, a significant change compared to prior years. A separate Bronze Cup for drivers with an FIA Bronze rating was also newly introduced.

=== Teams and drivers ===
Team	Chassis	Engine	No.	Drivers	AM	Rounds
NP02
(France) Switch Racing	Nova Proto NP02	Ford Coyote 5.0 L V8	4	(France) Nicco Ferrarin		1–2, 4
(France) Switch Racing	Nova Proto NP02	Ford Coyote 5.0 L V8	4	(France) Bruce Jouanny		1–2, 5
(France) Switch Racing	Nova Proto NP02	Ford Coyote 5.0 L V8	4	(France) Timothé Buret		1–2
(France) Switch Racing	Nova Proto NP02	Ford Coyote 5.0 L V8	4	(France) Sandro Perissoutti		3, 5
(France) Switch Racing	Nova Proto NP02	Ford Coyote 5.0 L V8	4	(Malaysia) Alister Yoong		3, 5
(France) Switch Racing	Nova Proto NP02	Ford Coyote 5.0 L V8	4	(France) Jérémy Merires		3
(France) Switch Racing	Nova Proto NP02	Ford Coyote 5.0 L V8	4	(France) Mike Parisy		3
(Switzerland) Graff Racing	Nova Proto NP02	Ford Coyote 5.0 L V8	7	(South Africa) Jonathan Thomas		2–5
(Switzerland) Graff Racing	Nova Proto NP02	Ford Coyote 5.0 L V8	7	(Australia) Neale Muston		2
(Switzerland) Graff Racing	Nova Proto NP02	Ford Coyote 5.0 L V8	7	(France) Louis Rossi		2
(Switzerland) Graff Racing	Nova Proto NP02	Ford Coyote 5.0 L V8	7	(France) Franck Dezoteux		3
(Switzerland) Graff Racing	Nova Proto NP02	Ford Coyote 5.0 L V8	7	(France) Gaël Julien		3
(Switzerland) Graff Racing	Nova Proto NP02	Ford Coyote 5.0 L V8	7	Maksim Arkhangelskiy		4–5
(Switzerland) Graff Racing	Nova Proto NP02	Ford Coyote 5.0 L V8	7	(France) Louis Maurice		4
(Switzerland) Graff Racing	Nova Proto NP02	Ford Coyote 5.0 L V8	7	Ivan Ovsienko		5
(Switzerland) Graff Racing	Nova Proto NP02	Ford Coyote 5.0 L V8	8	(Taiwan) Jimmy Chou		1–5
(Switzerland) Graff Racing	Nova Proto NP02	Ford Coyote 5.0 L V8	8	(France) Alexandre Cougnaud		1–5
(Switzerland) Graff Racing	Nova Proto NP02	Ford Coyote 5.0 L V8	8	(Switzerland) Loris Kyburz		1–5
(Switzerland) Graff Racing	Nova Proto NP02	Ford Coyote 5.0 L V8	9	(Switzerland) David Droux		1–5
(Switzerland) Graff Racing	Nova Proto NP02	Ford Coyote 5.0 L V8	9	(France) Eric Trouillet		1–5
(Switzerland) Graff Racing	Nova Proto NP02	Ford Coyote 5.0 L V8	9	(Belgium) Quentin Joseph		1–5
(France) Lamo Racing Car	Nova Proto NP02	Ford Coyote 5.0 L V8	17	(Switzerland) Caryl Fritsche		1–5
(France) Lamo Racing Car	Nova Proto NP02	Ford Coyote 5.0 L V8	17	(France) Frédéric Morel		1–5
(France) Lamo Racing Car	Nova Proto NP02	Ford Coyote 5.0 L V8	17	(Luxembourg) Enzo Richer		1–4
(France) Lamo Racing Car	Nova Proto NP02	Ford Coyote 5.0 L V8	777	(Switzerland) Danny Buntschu		1–5
(France) Lamo Racing Car	Nova Proto NP02	Ford Coyote 5.0 L V8	777	(France) Alexandre Lafourcade		1–5
(France) Lamo Racing Car	Nova Proto NP02	Ford Coyote 5.0 L V8	777	(Australia) Neale Muston		4
(France) Lamo Racing Car	Nova Proto NP02	Ford Coyote 5.0 L V8	777	(Luxembourg) Enzo Richer		5
(France) DB Autosport	Nova Proto NP02	Ford Coyote 5.0 L V8	20	(France) Romain Carton		1–5
(France) DB Autosport	Nova Proto NP02	Ford Coyote 5.0 L V8	20	(Switzerland) Mathias Beche		1–2, 4–5
(France) DB Autosport	Nova Proto NP02	Ford Coyote 5.0 L V8	20	(France) Philippe Lenoir		1
(France) DB Autosport	Nova Proto NP02	Ford Coyote 5.0 L V8	20	(France) Pierre Couasnon		2–3, 5
(France) DB Autosport	Nova Proto NP02	Ford Coyote 5.0 L V8	20	(Switzerland) Christophe Hurni		4
(France) DB Autosport	Nova Proto NP02	Ford Coyote 5.0 L V8	21	(France) Daniel Bassora		1–2, 4
(France) DB Autosport	Nova Proto NP02	Ford Coyote 5.0 L V8	21	(France) Quentin Bassora		1–2, 4
(France) DB Autosport	Nova Proto NP02	Ford Coyote 5.0 L V8	21	(France) Adrien Bastide		1, 4
(France) DB Autosport	Nova Proto NP02	Ford Coyote 5.0 L V8	21	(France) Viny Beltramelli		2
(France) DB Autosport	Nova Proto NP02	Ford Coyote 5.0 L V8	21	(France) Daniel Bassora	X	3, 5
(France) DB Autosport	Nova Proto NP02	Ford Coyote 5.0 L V8	21	(France) Quentin Bassora	X	3, 5
(France) DB Autosport	Nova Proto NP02	Ford Coyote 5.0 L V8	21	(France) Lionel Robert	X	3
(France) DB Autosport	Nova Proto NP02	Ford Coyote 5.0 L V8	21	(Switzerland) Christophe Hurni	X	5
(France) DB Autosport	Nova Proto NP02	Ford Coyote 5.0 L V8	22	(France) Hugo Lacasse		3–5
(France) DB Autosport	Nova Proto NP02	Ford Coyote 5.0 L V8	22	(France) David Monclair		3–5
(France) Racing Spirit of Léman	Nova Proto NP02	Ford Coyote 5.0 L V8	25	(Switzerland) Sacha Clavadetscher		1–5
(France) Racing Spirit of Léman	Nova Proto NP02	Ford Coyote 5.0 L V8	25	(France) Frédéric Lacore		1–5
(France) Racing Spirit of Léman	Nova Proto NP02	Ford Coyote 5.0 L V8	25	(Denmark) Christian Jorgensen		1
(France) Racing Spirit of Léman	Nova Proto NP02	Ford Coyote 5.0 L V8	25	(France) Kévin Parsa		4
(France) Racing Spirit of Léman	Nova Proto NP02	Ford Coyote 5.0 L V8	51	(Paraguay) Oscar Bittar		1–5
(France) Racing Spirit of Léman	Nova Proto NP02	Ford Coyote 5.0 L V8	51	(Denmark) Mikkel Gaarde Pedersen		1
(France) Racing Spirit of Léman	Nova Proto NP02	Ford Coyote 5.0 L V8	51	(France) Jacques Wolff		2–5
(France) Racing Spirit of Léman	Nova Proto NP02	Ford Coyote 5.0 L V8	51	(Switzerland) Nicolas Maulini		2–3, 5
(France) Racing Spirit of Léman	Nova Proto NP02	Ford Coyote 5.0 L V8	51	(France) Marius Fossard		4
(France) 23 Events Racing	Nova Proto NP02	Ford Coyote 5.0 L V8	27	(France) Christophe Cresp	X	1–5
(France) 23 Events Racing	Nova Proto NP02	Ford Coyote 5.0 L V8	27	(France) Maxence Maurice	X	1–5
(France) 23 Events Racing	Nova Proto NP02	Ford Coyote 5.0 L V8	28	(United Arab Emirates) Alim Geshev		1–5
(France) 23 Events Racing	Nova Proto NP02	Ford Coyote 5.0 L V8	28	(United Kingdom) James Winslow		1–5
(France) 23 Events Racing	Nova Proto NP02	Ford Coyote 5.0 L V8	28	(Saint Kitts and Nevis) Alexander Bukhantsov (Note: Bukhantsov is Russian, but he competes under a Kittitian licence as Russian national emblems were banned by the FIA following the Russian invasion of Ukraine.)		2–3
(France) CD Sport	Nova Proto NP02	Ford Coyote 5.0 L V8	30	(United Kingdom) Nick Adcock		1–5
(France) CD Sport	Nova Proto NP02	Ford Coyote 5.0 L V8	30	(South Africa) Michael Stephen		1–5
(France) CD Sport	Nova Proto NP02	Ford Coyote 5.0 L V8	30	(South Africa) Jonathan Thomas		1
(France) CD Sport	Nova Proto NP02	Ford Coyote 5.0 L V8	30	(South Africa) Tate Bishop		3
(France) CD Sport	Nova Proto NP02	Ford Coyote 5.0 L V8	31	(United Kingdom) Rob Greenwood		1–5
(France) CD Sport	Nova Proto NP02	Ford Coyote 5.0 L V8	31	(United Kingdom) Chris Short		1–5
(France) CD Sport	Nova Proto NP02	Ford Coyote 5.0 L V8	31	(France) Arthur Rogeon		1–2, 4–5
(France) CD Sport	Nova Proto NP02	Ford Coyote 5.0 L V8	31	(France) Thomas Imbourg		3
(France) CD Sport	Nova Proto NP02	Ford Coyote 5.0 L V8	32	(France) Augustin Bernier		1–5
(France) CD Sport	Nova Proto NP02	Ford Coyote 5.0 L V8	32	(France) Arlan Boulain		1–5
(France) CD Sport	Nova Proto NP02	Ford Coyote 5.0 L V8	32	(France) Gilles Heriau		1–5
(France) CD Sport	Nova Proto NP02	Ford Coyote 5.0 L V8	33	(United Kingdom) Maxwell Dodds		1–3
(France) CD Sport	Nova Proto NP02	Ford Coyote 5.0 L V8	33	(South Africa) Tate Bishop		1–2, 4
(France) CD Sport	Nova Proto NP02	Ford Coyote 5.0 L V8	33	(Denmark) Michael Jensen		1–2
(France) CD Sport	Nova Proto NP02	Ford Coyote 5.0 L V8	33	(France) William Cavailhes		3–4
(France) CD Sport	Nova Proto NP02	Ford Coyote 5.0 L V8	33	(France) Nicolas Melin		3
(France) CD Sport	Nova Proto NP02	Ford Coyote 5.0 L V8	33	(Denmark) Christian Jorgensen		4
(France) CD Sport	Nova Proto NP02	Ford Coyote 5.0 L V8	33	(France) Jean-Ludovic Foubert		5
(France) CD Sport	Nova Proto NP02	Ford Coyote 5.0 L V8	33	(France) François Hériau		5
(France) CD Sport	Nova Proto NP02	Ford Coyote 5.0 L V8	33	(South Africa) Charl Visser		5
(France) Cogemo Racing	Nova Proto NP02	Ford Coyote 5.0 L V8	57	(France) Nicolas Chartier	X	1–2, 4–5
(France) Cogemo Racing	Nova Proto NP02	Ford Coyote 5.0 L V8	57	(Switzerland) Stephan Rupp	X	1–2, 4–5
(France) Cogemo Racing	Nova Proto NP02	Ford Coyote 5.0 L V8	57	(France) Vincent Capillaire		3
(France) Cogemo Racing	Nova Proto NP02	Ford Coyote 5.0 L V8	57	(France) Nicolas Chartier		3
(France) Cogemo Racing	Nova Proto NP02	Ford Coyote 5.0 L V8	57	(Switzerland) Stephan Rupp		3
(France) Cogemo Racing	Nova Proto NP02	Ford Coyote 5.0 L V8	154	(France) Erwin Creed		1–5
(France) Cogemo Racing	Nova Proto NP02	Ford Coyote 5.0 L V8	154	(France) Marlon Hernandez		1–5
(France) Cogemo Racing	Nova Proto NP02	Ford Coyote 5.0 L V8	154	(France) Nicolas Prost		1–5
(France) Cogemo Racing	Nova Proto NP02	Ford Coyote 5.0 L V8	555	(France) Denis Caillon	X	1–5
(France) Cogemo Racing	Nova Proto NP02	Ford Coyote 5.0 L V8	555	(France) Sebastien Morales	X	1–5
(France) Cogemo Racing	Nova Proto NP02	Ford Coyote 5.0 L V8	555	(France) Philippe Thirion	X	1–5
(Switzerland) Haegeli by T2 Racing	Nova Proto NP02	Ford Coyote 5.0 L V8	66	(Switzerland) Pieder Decurtins	X	2–3
(Switzerland) Haegeli by T2 Racing	Nova Proto NP02	Ford Coyote 5.0 L V8	66	(Switzerland) Philipp Schlegel	X	2–3
(Switzerland) Haegeli by T2 Racing	Nova Proto NP02	Ford Coyote 5.0 L V8	66	(Netherlands) Mitchell Van Dijk	X	2–3
(Switzerland) Haegeli by T2 Racing	Nova Proto NP02	Ford Coyote 5.0 L V8	66	(Germany) Marc Basseng		4
(Switzerland) Haegeli by T2 Racing	Nova Proto NP02	Ford Coyote 5.0 L V8	66	(Switzerland) Pieder Decurtins		4
(Switzerland) Haegeli by T2 Racing	Nova Proto NP02	Ford Coyote 5.0 L V8	66	(Netherlands) Mitchell Van Dijk		4
(France) ANS Motorsport	Nova Proto NP02	Ford Coyote 5.0 L V8	70	(Switzerland) Alexandre Bochez	X	1, 3–4
(France) ANS Motorsport	Nova Proto NP02	Ford Coyote 5.0 L V8	70	(Switzerland) Mikael Bochez	X	1, 3–4
(France) ANS Motorsport	Nova Proto NP02	Ford Coyote 5.0 L V8	70	(France) Benoit Farines		2
(France) ANS Motorsport	Nova Proto NP02	Ford Coyote 5.0 L V8	70	(Belgium) Alexandre Leroy		2
(France) ANS Motorsport	Nova Proto NP02	Ford Coyote 5.0 L V8	70	(France) Grégory Segers		2
(France) ANS Motorsport	Nova Proto NP02	Ford Coyote 5.0 L V8	71	(France) Adrien Chila		1–5
(France) ANS Motorsport	Nova Proto NP02	Ford Coyote 5.0 L V8	71	(Spain) Belén García		1–5
(France) ANS Motorsport	Nova Proto NP02	Ford Coyote 5.0 L V8	71	(France) Paul Trojani		1–5
(France) ANS Motorsport	Nova Proto NP02	Ford Coyote 5.0 L V8	72	(France) Adrien Yvon	X	1–5
(France) ANS Motorsport	Nova Proto NP02	Ford Coyote 5.0 L V8	72	(France) Alexandre Yvon	X	1–5
(France) ANS Motorsport	Nova Proto NP02	Ford Coyote 5.0 L V8	72	(France) Jean-François Yvon	X	1–5
(France) ANS Motorsport	Nova Proto NP02	Ford Coyote 5.0 L V8	73	(France) Frederic Croullet		1–5
(France) ANS Motorsport	Nova Proto NP02	Ford Coyote 5.0 L V8	73	(France) Gregoire Croullet		1–3, 5
(France) ANS Motorsport	Nova Proto NP02	Ford Coyote 5.0 L V8	73	(France) Nicolas Schatz		3–4
(Switzerland) SRT	Nova Proto NP02	Ford Coyote 5.0 L V8	95	(France) Enzo Caldaras		5
(Switzerland) SRT	Nova Proto NP02	Ford Coyote 5.0 L V8	95	(France) Sean Canivet		5
(Switzerland) SRT	Nova Proto NP02	Ford Coyote 5.0 L V8	95	(France) Gwenaël Delomier		5
(France) Nerguti Competition	Nova Proto NP02	Ford Coyote 5.0 L V8	99	(France) Cindy Gudet		1–5
(France) Nerguti Competition	Nova Proto NP02	Ford Coyote 5.0 L V8	99	(France) Alban Nerguti		1–5
(France) Nerguti Competition	Nova Proto NP02	Ford Coyote 5.0 L V8	99	(France) Valentin Simonet		1–5
Entry lists:

=== Championship standings ===
==== Drivers' standings ====
Pos.	Drivers	Team	(France) LEC1	(Italy) MUG	(Portugal) ALG	(Spain) ARA	(France) MAG	(France) LEC2	Points
1	(France) Romain Carton	(France) DB Autosport	1	1	11	4	**2**	**4**	92.5
2	(United Arab Emirates) Alim Geshev	(France) 23 Events Racing	4	16	5	2	3	1	80.5
2	(United Kingdom) James Winslow	(France) 23 Events Racing	4	16	5	2	3	1	80.5
3	(Switzerland) Mathias Beche	(France) DB Autosport	1	1		4	**2**		80
4	(Spain) Belén García	(France) ANS Motorsport	3	2	8	20†	4	2	67.5
4	(France) Paul Trojani	(France) ANS Motorsport	3	2	8	20†	4	2	67.5
5	(France) Erwin Creed	(France) Cogemo Racing	6	**11**	1	**1**	8	18	63
5	(France) Marlon Hernandez	(France) Cogemo Racing	6	**11**	1	**1**	8	18	63
5	(France) Nicolas Prost	(France) Cogemo Racing	6	**11**	1	**1**	8	18	63
6	(France) Adrien Chila	(France) ANS Motorsport	3	2	8	20†	4		49.5
7	(France) Pierre Couasnon	(France) DB Autosport		1	11		**2**		43.5
8	(Switzerland) David Droux	(Switzerland) Graff Racing	2	9	7	3	20	10	42.5
8	(Belgium) Quentin Joseph	(Switzerland) Graff Racing	2	9	7	3	20	10	42.5
8	(France) Eric Trouillet	(Switzerland) Graff Racing	2	9	7	3	20	10	42.5
9	(France) Christophe Cresp	(France) 23 Events Racing	Ret	23†	20	Ret	1	3	41
9	(France) Maxence Maurice	(France) 23 Events Racing	Ret	23†	20	Ret	1	3	41
10	(Switzerland) Danny Buntschu	(France) Lamo Racing Car	9	5	14	6	5	6	38.5
10	(France) Alexandre Lafourcade	(France) Lamo Racing Car	9	5	14	6	5	6	38.5
11	(United Kingdom) Nick Adcock	(France) CD Sport	Ret	4	2	21†	16	8	35
11	(South Africa) Michael Stephen	(France) CD Sport	Ret	4	2	21†	16	8	35
12	(Luxembourg) Enzo Richer	(France) Lamo Racing Car	8	20	25	7	5	6	29
13	(France) Philippe Lenoir	(France) DB Autosport	1						25
14	(South Africa) Tate Bishop	(France) CD Sport	7	Ret	2	Ret			24
15	(France) Louis Rossi	(Switzerland) Graff Racing		7					24
15	(France) Louis Rossi	(France) ANS Motorsport						2	24
16	(France) Quentin Bassora	(France) DB Autosport	5	14	12	19	18	**4**	24
17	(France) Augustin Bernier	(France) CD Sport	10	3	Ret	Ret	23	7	22.5
17	(France) Arlan Boulain	(France) CD Sport	10	3	Ret	Ret	23	7	22.5
17	(France) Gilles Heriau	(France) CD Sport	10	3	Ret	Ret	23	7	22.5
18	(France) Denis Caillon	(France) Cogemo Racing	11	6	4	10	12	12	22.5
18	(France) Sebastien Morales	(France) Cogemo Racing	11	6	4	10	12	12	22.5
18	(France) Philippe Thirion	(France) Cogemo Racing	11	6	4	10	12	12	22.5
19	(South Africa) Jonathan Thomas	(Switzerland) Graff Racing		7	3				21
20	(Malaysia) Alister Yoong	(France) Switch Racing			15	13	6	5	19
20	(France) Sandro Perissoutti	(France) Switch Racing			15	13	6	5	19
21	(France) Gaël Julien	(Switzerland) Graff Racing			3			Ret	15
=	(France) Franck Dezoteux	(Switzerland) Graff Racing			3				15
23	(France) Nicolas Chartier	(France) Cogemo Racing	14	21	6	8	15	17	14
23	(Switzerland) Stephan Rupp	(France) Cogemo Racing	14	21	6	8	15	17	14
24	(Switzerland) Christophe Hurni	(France) DB Autosport				4	18		12.5
25	(France) Daniel Bassora	(France) DB Autosport	5	14	12	19	18	20	12.5
26	(Netherlands) Job van Uitert	(France) DB Autosport						**4**	12
27	(France) Frederic Croullet	(France) ANS Motorsport	15	17	16	5	17	Ret	12
28	(Switzerland) Caryl Fritsche	(France) Lamo Racing Car	8	20	25	7	11	23	12
28	(France) Frédéric Morel	(France) Lamo Racing Car	8	20	25	7	11	23	12
29	(France) Adrien Bastide	(France) DB Autosport	5			19		20	11
30	(Saint Kitts and Nevis) Alexander Bukhantsov	(France) 23 Events Racing		16	5				10.5
=	(France) Nicolas Schatz	(France) ANS Motorsport			16	5			10.5
32	(France) Fabien Michal	(France) Switch Racing						5	10
33	(France) Bruce Jouanny	(France) Switch Racing	18	22†			6		9
34	(Switzerland) Sacha Clavadetscher	(France) Racing Spirit of Léman	16	15	19	15	7	15	8.5
34	(France) Frédéric Lacore	(France) Racing Spirit of Léman	16	15	19	15	7	15	8.5
35	(France) Vincent Capillaire	(France) Cogemo Racing			6				8
=	(Australia) Neale Muston	(France) Lamo Racing Car				6			8
37	(Switzerland) Pieder Decurtins	(Switzerland) Haegeli by T2 Racing		8	10	9		Ret	7
=	(Netherlands) Mitchell Van Dijk	(Switzerland) Haegeli by T2 Racing		8	10	9			7
39	(United Kingdom) Maxwell Dodds	(France) CD Sport	7	Ret	22				6.5
40	(Denmark) Michael Jensen	(France) CD Sport	7	Ret					6
=	(Australia) Neale Muston	(Switzerland) Graff Racing		7					6
42	(France) Cindy Gudet	(France) Nerguti Competition	13	12	9	12		9	5.5
42	(France) Alban Nerguti	(France) Nerguti Competition	13	12	9	12		9	5.5
42	(France) Valentin Simonet	(France) Nerguti Competition	13	12	9	12		9	5.5
43	(Taiwan) Jimmy Chou	(Switzerland) Graff Racing	**19†**	13	**24**	16	9	19	4.5
43	(France) Alexandre Cougnaud	(Switzerland) Graff Racing	**19†**	13	**24**	16	9	19	4.5
43	(Switzerland) Loris Kyburz	(Switzerland) Graff Racing	**19†**	13	**24**	16	9	19	4.5
44	(Switzerland) Philipp Schlegel	(Switzerland) Haegeli by T2 Racing		8				Ret	4
45	(France) Jacques Wolff	(France) Racing Spirit of Léman	12	24†	13	17	10	13	3.5
46	(Germany) Marc Basseng	(Switzerland) Haegeli by T2 Racing			10	9		Ret	3
47	(France) Adrien Yvon	(France) ANS Motorsport	20	19	21	18	21	16	3
47	(France) Alexandre Yvon	(France) ANS Motorsport	20	19	21	18	21	16	3
47	(France) Jean-François Yvon	(France) ANS Motorsport	20	19	21	18	21	16	3
48	(Switzerland) Nicolas Maulini	(France) Racing Spirit of Léman		24†	13		10	13	2.5
49	(United Kingdom) Rob Greenwood	(France) CD Sport	Ret	10	23	Ret	14	22†	2.5
49	(United Kingdom) Chris Short	(France) CD Sport	Ret	10	23	Ret	14	22†	2.5
50	(France) Arthur Rogeon	(France) CD Sport	Ret	10		Ret	14	22†	2
51	(Paraguay) Oscar Bittar	(France) Racing Spirit of Léman	12	24†	13	17			2
52	(France) Gregoire Croullet	(France) ANS Motorsport	15	17	16		17	Ret	2
53	(Switzerland) Alexandre Bochez	(France) ANS Motorsport	17		17	11			1.5
53	(Switzerland) Mikael Bochez	(France) ANS Motorsport	17		17	11			1.5
54	(France) Hugo Lacasse	(France) DB Autosport			18	14	13		1.5
54	(France) David Monclair	(France) DB Autosport			18	14	13		1.5
55	(France) Nicco Ferrarin	(France) Switch Racing	18	22†		13			1.5
56	(Italy) Ivan Ruggiero	(Switzerland) Haegeli by T2 Racing			10				1
57	(France) Benoit Farines	(France) ANS Motorsport		18				11	1
57	(Belgium) Alexandre Leroy	(France) ANS Motorsport		18				11	1
57	(France) Grégory Segers	(France) ANS Motorsport		18				11	1
58	(France) Lionel Robert	(France) DB Autosport			12			20	1
59	(France) Jean-Ludovic Foubert	(France) CD Sport					22	14	1
60	(France) Timothé Buret	(France) Switch Racing	18	22†					1
61	(France) Enzo Caldaras	(Switzerland) SRT					19	21	1
61	(France) Gwenaël Delomier	(Switzerland) SRT					19	21	1
62	(France) Paul Lanchère	(France) DB Autosport			11				0.5
63	(Denmark) Mikkel Gaarde Pedersen	(France) Racing Spirit of Léman	12						0.5
64	(France) Benjamin Monnay	(France) Racing Spirit of Léman						13	0.5
65	(France) Viny Beltramelli	(France) DB Autosport		14					0.5
66	(Australia) Nathan Kumar	(France) CD Sport						14	0.5
66	(Lebanon) Shahan Sarkissian	(France) CD Sport						14	0.5
67	(France) Louis Maurice	(France) CD Sport				Ret			0.5
67	(France) Louis Maurice	(France) Racing Spirit of Léman						15	0.5
=	(France) Jérémy Merires	(France) Switch Racing			15				0.5
=	(France) Mike Parisy	(France) Switch Racing			15				0.5
=	(France) Kévin Parsa	(France) Racing Spirit of Léman				15			0.5
70	(Denmark) Christian Jorgensen	(France) Racing Spirit of Léman	16						0.5
71	(France) Marius Fossard	(France) Racing Spirit of Léman				17			0.5
72	(United Kingdom) Ben Stone	(France) Racing Spirit of Léman			19				0.5
=	(France) Sean Canivet	(Switzerland) SRT					19		0.5
74	(France) Alexandre Monnot	(Switzerland) SRT						21	0.5
75	(France) William Cavailhes	(France) CD Sport			22	Ret			0.5
=	(France) Nicolas Melin	(France) CD Sport			22				0.5
77	(France) François Hériau	(France) CD Sport					22		0.5
77	(South Africa) Charl Visser	(France) CD Sport					22		0.5
78	(France) Thomas Imbourg	(France) CD Sport			23				0.5
-	(South Africa) Jonathan Thomas	(France) CD Sport	Ret			Ret	Ret		-
-	(South Africa) Jonathan Thomas	(Switzerland) Graff Racing						Ret	-
-	Maksim Arkhangelskiy	(France) CD Sport				Ret	Ret		-
-	(Denmark) Christian Jorgensen	(France) CD Sport				Ret			-
-	Ivan Ovsienko	(France) CD Sport					Ret		-
Pos.	Drivers	Team	(France) LEC1	(Italy) MUG	(Portugal) ALG	(Spain) ARA	(France) MAG	(France) LEC2	Points

Key
Colour	Result
Gold	Winner
Silver	Second place
Bronze	Third place
Green	Other points position
Blue	Other classified position
Blue	Not classified, finished (NC)
Purple	Not classified, retired (Ret)
Red	Did not qualify (DNQ)
Red	Did not pre-qualify (DNPQ)
Black	Disqualified (DSQ)
White	Did not start (DNS)
White	Race cancelled (C)
Blank	Did not practice (DNP)
Blank	Excluded (EX)
Blank	Did not arrive (DNA)
Blank	Withdrawn (WD)
Blank	Did not enter (cell empty)
Text formatting	Meaning
**Bold**	Pole position
Italics	Fastest lap

† – Drivers did not finish the race, but were classified as they completed over 75% of the class winner's race distance.

== European Sprint Prototype Cup ==
The LMP3 cars previously racing in the European Endurance Prototype Cup were placed in their own category in 2025, called the European Sprint Prototype Cup.

=== Teams and drivers ===
Team	Chassis	Engine	No.	Drivers	Am	Rounds
(Luxembourg) DKR Engineering	Duqueine M30 - D08	Nissan VK56DE 5.6 L V8	3	(United States) Jon Brownson		All
(Luxembourg) DKR Engineering	Duqueine M30 - D08	Nissan VK56DE 5.6 L V8	3	(Germany) Laurents Hörr		All
(Czech Republic) Bretton Racing	Ligier JS P320	Nissan VK56DE 5.6 L V8	26	(Switzerland) Ralf Meichtry		All
(Czech Republic) Bretton Racing	Ligier JS P320	Nissan VK56DE 5.6 L V8	26	(United Kingdom) Ewan Thomas		All
(Czech Republic) Bretton Racing	Ligier JS P320	Nissan VK56DE 5.6 L V8	62	(Denmark) Theodor Jensen		1
(Czech Republic) Bretton Racing	Ligier JS P320	Nissan VK56DE 5.6 L V8	62	(Czech Republic) Dan Skocdopole		1
(Slovakia) ARC Bratislava	Ligier JS P320	Nissan VK56DE 5.6 L V8	4	(Slovakia) Adam Konopka		3
(Slovakia) ARC Bratislava	Ligier JS P320	Nissan VK56DE 5.6 L V8	44	(Slovakia) Miro Konopka	X	All
(Germany) Rinaldi Racing	Duqueine M30 - D08	Nissan VK56DE 5.6 L V8	33	(Germany) Thomas Ambiel		5
(Germany) Rinaldi Racing	Duqueine M30 - D08	Nissan VK56DE 5.6 L V8	33	(Germany) Leonard Weiss		5
(Spain) AF2 Motorsport	Ligier JS P320	Nissan VK56DE 5.6 L V8	47	(Denmark) Kevin Verner Jensen		1
(Spain) AF2 Motorsport	Ligier JS P320	Nissan VK56DE 5.6 L V8	47	(Netherlands) Rick Bouthoorn		3
(Austria) MG Sound Speed Division	Ginetta G61-LT-P3	Nissan VK56DE 5.6 L V8	61	(Austria) Martin Böhm	X	1–3, 5
(Austria) MG Sound Speed Division	Ginetta G61-LT-P3	Nissan VK56DE 5.6 L V8	61	(Austria) Andreas Fojtik	X	1–3, 5
Entry Lists:

=== Championship standings ===
==== Drivers' standings ====
Pos.	Drivers	Team	(France) LEC1		(Italy) MUG		(Portugal) ALG		(France) MAG		(France) LEC2		Points
1	(United Kingdom) Ewan Thomas	(Czech Republic) Bretton Racing	**2**	3	**4†**	2	**1**	1	**1**	1	1	1	213
2	(United States) Jon Brownson	(Luxembourg) DKR Engineering	3	2	1	**1**	2	**3†**	2	**4†**	3	**3**	176
2	(Germany) Laurents Hörr	(Luxembourg) DKR Engineering	3	2	1	**1**	2	**3†**	2	**4†**	3	**3**	176
3	(Switzerland) Ralf Meichtry	(Czech Republic) Bretton Racing	**2**	3	**4†**	2			**1**	1	1	1	163
4	(Slovakia) Miro Konopka	(Slovakia) ARC Bratislava	5	4	2	3	4	Ret	3	3	4	4	121
5	(Austria) Martin Böhm	(Austria) MG Sound Speed Division	6	5	3	4†	5	Ret			6	6	71
6	(Austria) Andreas Fojtik	(Austria) MG Sound Speed Division	6	5	3	4†					6	6	61
7	(Denmark) Theodor Jensen	(Czech Republic) Bretton Racing	1	**1**									50
7	(Czech Republic) Dan Skocdopole	(Czech Republic) Bretton Racing	1	**1**									50
=	(United Kingdom) Ben Stone	(Czech Republic) Bretton Racing					**1**	1					50
9	(France) Emmanuel Collard	(France) Racetivity									2	2	36
9	(France) Charles-Henri Samani	(France) Racetivity									2	2	36
10	(Slovakia) Adam Konopka	(Slovakia) ARC Bratislava					3	2					33
11	(Germany) Thomas Ambiel	(Germany) Rinaldi Racing							4	2			30
11	(Germany) Leonard Weiss	(Germany) Rinaldi Racing							4	2			30
12	(China) Yuhao Dai	(Switzerland) Graff									**5**	5	20
12	(Hong Kong) Kaiwen Yang	(Switzerland) Graff									**5**	5	20
13	(Denmark) Kevin Verner Jensen	(Spain) AF2 Motorsport	4	DNS									12
Pos.	Drivers	Team	(France) LEC1		(Italy) MUG		(Portugal) ALG		(France) MAG		(France) LEC2		Points

Key
Colour	Result
Gold	Winner
Silver	Second place
Bronze	Third place
Green	Other points position
Blue	Other classified position
Blue	Not classified, finished (NC)
Purple	Not classified, retired (Ret)
Red	Did not qualify (DNQ)
Red	Did not pre-qualify (DNPQ)
Black	Disqualified (DSQ)
White	Did not start (DNS)
White	Race cancelled (C)
Blank	Did not practice (DNP)
Blank	Excluded (EX)
Blank	Did not arrive (DNA)
Blank	Withdrawn (WD)
Blank	Did not enter (cell empty)
Text formatting	Meaning
**Bold**	Pole position
Italics	Fastest lap

† – Drivers did not finish the race, but were classified as they completed over 75% of the class winner's race distance.

== GT Endurance Cup ==
The Ultimate GT Endurance Cup was open to GT3, GT4 and single-make series (Porsche Carrera Cup, Ferrari Challenge, Lamborghini Super Trofeo) cars. Its number of different classes was reduced in 2025: drivers were competing in four classes numbered from UCS1 to UCS4 as well as a separate Porsche Cup class, meaning the UCS Light class was discontinued.

=== Teams and drivers ===
Team	Chassis	Engine	No.	Drivers	Rounds
UCS1
(France) Visiom	Ferrari 488 GT3 Evo 2020	Ferrari F154CB 3.9 L Turbo V8	1	(France) Romain Iannetta	1
(France) Visiom	Ferrari 488 GT3 Evo 2020	Ferrari F154CB 3.9 L Turbo V8	1	(France) Jean-Bernard Bouvet	1–3
(France) Visiom	Ferrari 488 GT3 Evo 2020	Ferrari F154CB 3.9 L Turbo V8	1	(France) Jean-Paul Pagny	1–3
(France) Visiom	Ferrari 488 GT3 Evo 2020	Ferrari F154CB 3.9 L Turbo V8	1	(France) David Hallyday	2–3
(Switzerland) Graff Racing	Rossa LM GT	Audi DAR 5.2 L V10	8	Roman Rusinov (Note: Rusinov and Gutak are Russian, but they compete as neutral competitors as Russian national emblems were banned by the FIA following the Russian invasion of Ukraine.)	3
(Switzerland) Graff Racing	Rossa LM GT	Audi DAR 5.2 L V10	8	(Cyprus) Eugeny Kireev	3
(Switzerland) Graff Racing	Rossa LM GT	Audi DAR 5.2 L V10	8	Vyacheslav Gutak	3
(France) Vortex	Vortex 2.0	Chevrolet LS3 6.2 L V8	20	(France) Philippe Papin	1
(France) Vortex	Vortex 2.0	Chevrolet LS3 6.2 L V8	20	(France) Roland Marchix	1–4
(France) Vortex	Vortex 2.0	Chevrolet LS3 6.2 L V8	20	(France) Enzo Richer	1–4
(France) Vortex	Vortex 2.0	Chevrolet LS3 6.2 L V8	20	(France) Ethan Pharamond	3
(France) Vortex	Vortex 2.0	Chevrolet LS3 6.2 L V8	21	(France) Philippe Bonnel	1
(France) Vortex	Vortex 2.0	Chevrolet LS3 6.2 L V8	21	(France) Philippe Burel	1
(France) Vortex	Vortex 2.0	Chevrolet LS3 6.2 L V8	21	(France) Laurent Delesalle	1
(France) Vortex	Vortex 2.0	Chevrolet LS3 6.2 L V8	21	(France) Lionel Amrouche	3–4
(France) Vortex	Vortex 2.0	Chevrolet LS3 6.2 L V8	21	(France) Julien Boillot	3–4
(France) Vortex	Vortex 2.0	Chevrolet LS3 6.2 L V8	22	(France) Arnaud Gomez	1, 3–4
(France) Vortex	Vortex 2.0	Chevrolet LS3 6.2 L V8	22	(France) Olivier Gomez	1, 3–4
(France) TFT Racing	Mercedes-AMG GT3	Mercedes-AMG M159 6.2 L V8	28	(France) Petrick Charlaix	3–4
(France) TFT Racing	Mercedes-AMG GT3	Mercedes-AMG M159 6.2 L V8	28	(France) Jordan Boisson	3–4
(France) TFT Racing	Mercedes-AMG GT3	Mercedes-AMG M159 6.2 L V8	28	(Belgium) Benjamin Paque	3–4
(France) Krafft Racing	Renault Sport R.S. 01	Nissan VR38DETT 3.8 L Twin-Turbo V6	37	(France) Jimmy Luminier	2–4
(France) Krafft Racing	Renault Sport R.S. 01	Nissan VR38DETT 3.8 L Twin-Turbo V6	37	(France) Christophe Derouineau	2–4
(France) Krafft Racing	Renault Sport R.S. 01	Nissan VR38DETT 3.8 L Twin-Turbo V6	37	(Switzerland) Axel Gnos	2
(France) Krafft Racing	Renault Sport R.S. 01	Nissan VR38DETT 3.8 L Twin-Turbo V6	37	(France) Jean-Christopher David	3
UCS2
(France) CMR	Lamborghini Huracán Super Trofeo Evo 2	Lamborghini 5.2 L V10	37	(Belgium) Rodrigue Gillion	1
(France) CMR	Lamborghini Huracán Super Trofeo Evo 2	Lamborghini 5.2 L V10	37	(Belgium) Stéphane Lémeret	1
UCTC
Porsche Cup
(France) 2B Autosport	Porsche 992 GT3 Cup	Porsche 4.0 L Flat-6	7	(France) Olivier Favre	1, 4
(France) 2B Autosport	Porsche 992 GT3 Cup	Porsche 4.0 L Flat-6	7	(France) Romain Favre	1, 4
(France) 2B Autosport	Porsche 992 GT3 Cup	Porsche 4.0 L Flat-6	7	(France) Louis Rousset	1, 4
(France) Mirage Racing	Porsche 992 GT3 Cup	Porsche 4.0 L Flat-6	10	(France) Jean-Jacques Ardilly	1–4
(France) Mirage Racing	Porsche 992 GT3 Cup	Porsche 4.0 L Flat-6	10	(France) Thibaud Carrai	1–4
(France) Mirage Racing	Porsche 992 GT3 Cup	Porsche 4.0 L Flat-6	10	(France) Lionel Rigaud	1–4
(France) Racing Technology	Porsche 992 GT3 Cup	Porsche 4.0 L Flat-6	11	(France) Gilles Blasco	2–3
(France) Racing Technology	Porsche 992 GT3 Cup	Porsche 4.0 L Flat-6	11	(France) Philippe Polette	2–3
(France) Racing Technology	Porsche 992 GT3 Cup	Porsche 4.0 L Flat-6	11	(France) Jean-François Demorge	2–3
(France) Racing Technology	Porsche 992 GT3 Cup	Porsche 4.0 L Flat-6	11	(France) Frédéric Lelièvre	2–3
(France) RR by Racetivity	Porsche 992 GT3 Cup	Porsche 4.0 L Flat-6	17	(Belgium) Benjamin Lessennes	1–3
(France) RR by Racetivity	Porsche 992 GT3 Cup	Porsche 4.0 L Flat-6	17	(France) Régis Rego de Sebes	1–3
(France) RR by Racetivity	Porsche 992 GT3 Cup	Porsche 4.0 L Flat-6	17	(Belgium) Daniel Waszczinsky	1–3
(France) Driv'n	Porsche 992 GT3 Cup	Porsche 4.0 L Flat-6	18	(Portugal) Tiago Monteiro	1
(France) Driv'n	Porsche 992 GT3 Cup	Porsche 4.0 L Flat-6	18	(South Africa) Harpal Shayur Avinash	1–3
(France) Driv'n	Porsche 992 GT3 Cup	Porsche 4.0 L Flat-6	18	(Netherlands) Jules Szymkowiak	2–3
(France) Net'Cuv Racing Team	Porsche 992 GT3 Cup	Porsche 4.0 L Flat-6	29	(France) Ulric Amado	1–3
(France) Net'Cuv Racing Team	Porsche 992 GT3 Cup	Porsche 4.0 L Flat-6	29	(France) Mickael Desmaele	1–3
(France) Martinet by Alméras	Porsche 992 GT3 Cup	Porsche 4.0 L Flat-6	71	(France) Enzo Joulié	1, 4
(France) Martinet by Alméras	Porsche 992 GT3 Cup	Porsche 4.0 L Flat-6	71	(France) Pierre Martinet	1, 4
(France) Martinet by Alméras	Porsche 992 GT3 Cup	Porsche 4.0 L Flat-6	71	(France) Gérard Tremblay	1, 4
(France) GP Racing Team	Porsche 992 GT3 Cup	Porsche 4.0 L Flat-6	89	(France) Anthony Beltoise	1–3
(France) GP Racing Team	Porsche 992 GT3 Cup	Porsche 4.0 L Flat-6	89	(France) Cyril Saleilles	1–3
(France) GP Racing Team	Porsche 992 GT3 Cup	Porsche 4.0 L Flat-6	89	(France) Loïc Teire	1–3
(France) GP Racing Team	Porsche 992 GT3 Cup	Porsche 4.0 L Flat-6	98	(France) Sébastien Loeb	1, 4
(France) GP Racing Team	Porsche 992 GT3 Cup	Porsche 4.0 L Flat-6	98	(France) Laurène Godey	1–4
(France) GP Racing Team	Porsche 992 GT3 Cup	Porsche 4.0 L Flat-6	98	(France) Gabriel Pemeant	1–4
(France) GP Racing Team	Porsche 992 GT3 Cup	Porsche 4.0 L Flat-6	98	(France) Steven Palette	2
(France) Seb Lajoux Racing	Porsche 992 GT3 Cup	Porsche 4.0 L Flat-6	888	(Belgium) Benjamin Paque	1
(France) Seb Lajoux Racing	Porsche 992 GT3 Cup	Porsche 4.0 L Flat-6	888	(France) Sebastien Lajoux	1–3
(France) Seb Lajoux Racing	Porsche 992 GT3 Cup	Porsche 4.0 L Flat-6	888	(France) Stéphane Perrin	1–3
(France) Seb Lajoux Racing	Porsche 992 GT3 Cup	Porsche 4.0 L Flat-6	888	(Andorra) Enzo Joulié	2
(France) Seb Lajoux Racing	Porsche 992 GT3 Cup	Porsche 4.0 L Flat-6	888	(Netherlands) Paul Meijer	3
UCS3
UCS4
(France) Chazel Technologie Course	Alpine A110 Cup	Alpine 1.4 L I4	19	(France) Julien Bounie	1–3
(France) Chazel Technologie Course	Alpine A110 Cup	Alpine 1.4 L I4	19	(France) Benoit Marion	1–3
(France) Chazel Technologie Course	Alpine A110 Cup	Alpine 1.4 L I4	19	(France) Olivier Martinez	1–3
(France) Chazel Technologie Course	Alpine A110 Cup	Alpine 1.4 L I4	93	(France) Marc Lopes	1, 3–4
(France) Chazel Technologie Course	Alpine A110 Cup	Alpine 1.4 L I4	93	(France) Benoit Pouillen	1, 3–4
(France) Chazel Technologie Course	Alpine A110 Cup	Alpine 1.4 L I4	93	(France) Bruno Servazeix	1, 3–4
(France) Chazel Technologie Course	Alpine A110 Cup	Alpine 1.4 L I4	94	(France) Marc Jacob	1–3
(France) Chazel Technologie Course	Alpine A110 Cup	Alpine 1.4 L I4	94	(France) Giani Sciabbarrasi	1–3
(France) Chazel Technologie Course	Alpine A110 Cup	Alpine 1.4 L I4	123	(France) Frédéric de Brabant	1–4
(France) Chazel Technologie Course	Alpine A110 Cup	Alpine 1.4 L I4	123	(France) Louka Desgranges	1–4
(France) CMR	Ginetta G55 GT4	TBA	51	(France) Laurent Mogica	3
(France) CMR	Ginetta G55 GT4	TBA	51	(France) Nicolas Eli	3
Entry Lists:

== GT-Sprint Cup ==
The Ultimate GT-Sprint Cup was open to GT3, GT4 and single-make series (Porsche Carrera Cup, Ferrari Challenge, Lamborghini Super Trofeo) cars. It consisted of the same UCS1-UCS4 classes seen in the GT Endurance Cup, as well as separate classes for the Porsche Cup and the Ferrari Challenge.

=== Teams and drivers ===
Team	Chassis	Engine	No.	Drivers	Rounds
UCS1
(France) Kennol Racing Team	Corvette C7 GT3-R	Chevrolet 6.2 L V8	2	(France) Olivier Morihain	1, 3
(Belgium) Francorchamps Motors Racing Classic	Ferrari 430 GT3	Ferrari 4.3 L V8	96	(France) Grégoire Benedet	1–2
UCS2
(France) Shumacher GP	Lamborghini Huracán Super Trofeo Evo 2	Lamborghini 5.2 L V10	18	(France) Pierre Macchi	3
(France) Shumacher GP	Lamborghini Huracán Super Trofeo Evo 2	Lamborghini 5.2 L V10	25	(France) Wilfried Cazalbon	3
(France) TFT Racing	Maserati MC20 GT2	Maserati 3.0L Twin-Turbo V6	28	(France) Jordan Boisson	1
(France) TFT Racing	Maserati MC20 GT2	Maserati 3.0L Twin-Turbo V6	28	(Canada) Patrick Charlaix	1
(France) CMR	Lamborghini Huracán Super Trofeo Evo 2	Lamborghini 5.2 L V10	37	(France) Alexis Berthet	1–2
(France) CMR	Lamborghini Huracán Super Trofeo Evo 2	Lamborghini 5.2 L V10	44	(France) Eric Mouez	1, 3
(Netherlands) Van der Horst Motorsport	Lamborghini Huracán Super Trofeo Evo 2	Lamborghini 5.2 L V10	98	(Netherlands) Gérard van der Horst	1, 3
UCTC
(Belgium) Francorchamps Motors Racing Classic	Ferrari F430 Challenge	Ferrari 4.3 L V8	69	(United States) Benjamine Mardeen	1–2
(France) CMR	Ferrari 296 Challenge	Ferrari 3.9 L Twin-Turbo V8	73	(France) Patrick Michellier	2–3
(Italy) SR&R	Ferrari 488 Challenge Evo	Ferrari 3.9 L Twin-Turbo V8	350	(Italy) Emilio Rocchi	2
(Italy) SR&R	Ferrari 488 Challenge Evo	Ferrari 3.9 L Twin-Turbo V8	350	(Italy) Maurizio Fondi	2
(Italy) SR&R	Ferrari 488 Challenge Evo	Ferrari 3.9 L Twin-Turbo V8	351	(Switzerland) Andreas Borris	2
(Italy) SR&R	Ferrari 488 GT3 Evo 2020	Ferrari 3.9 L Twin-Turbo V8	353	(Italy) Emilio Rocchi	1
(Italy) SR&R	Ferrari 488 GT3 Evo 2020	Ferrari 3.9 L Twin-Turbo V8	353	(Republic of Ireland) Lyle Schofield	1–2
(Italy) SR&R	Ferrari 488 GT3 Evo 2020	Ferrari 3.9 L Twin-Turbo V8	353	(Italy) Paolo Ruberti	2
(Italy) SR&R	Ferrari 458 Challenge Evo	Ferrari 3.9 L Twin-Turbo V8	357	(Italy) Simone Conti	2
Porsche Cup
(France) Seb Lajoux Racing	Porsche 992 GT3 Cup	Porsche 4.0 L Flat-6	888	(France) Billy Ritchen	1
(France) Seb Lajoux Racing	Porsche 992 GT3 Cup	Porsche 4.0 L Flat-6	888	(France) Stéphane Perrin	1–3
(France) Seb Lajoux Racing	Porsche 992 GT3 Cup	Porsche 4.0 L Flat-6	888	(Belgium) Lucas Taelman	3
UCS3
(France) Switch Racing	Porsche 718 Cayman GT4 Clubsport	Porsche 3.8 L Flat-6	8	(France) Jeremy Merires	1–2
(France) Switch Racing	Porsche 718 Cayman GT4 Clubsport	Porsche 3.8 L Flat-6	8	(France) Sandro Perissoutti	1–2
(France) Herrero Racing	Audi R8 LMS GT4 Evo	Audi 5.2 L V10	64	(France) Pierre Arraou	1
(France) Racing Spirit of Léman	Aston Martin Vantage AMR GT4 Evo	Aston Martin 4.0 L Turbo V8	74	(Switzerland) David Kullmann	1
(France) Team Speedcar	Audi R8 LMS GT4 Evo	Audi 5.2 L V10	444	(France) Philippe Thalamy	1
UCS4
(France) Driv'n	Porsche Cayman GT4 Clubsport MR	Porsche 3.8 L Flat-6	57	(France) André Zaphiratos	1–3
(France) Driv'n	Porsche Cayman GT4 Clubsport MR	Porsche 3.8 L Flat-6	58	(Portugal) Lourenço Monteiro	3
(France) Driv'n	Porsche Cayman GT4 Clubsport MR	Porsche 3.8 L Flat-6	58	(Portugal) Jose Cautela	3
(France) Driv'n	Mitjet Super T	Renault 3.5 L V6	88	(France) Thomas Petit	1
(France) Herrero Racing	Audi R8 LMS GT4	Audi 5.2 L V10	64	(France) Pierre Arraou	2–3
Entry Lists:

== Hoosier Formula Cup ==
The Hoosier Formula Cup, formerly known as the Ultimate Formula Cup, was open to Tatuus F3R T318 cars powered by either Alfa Romeo or Renault engines on 13-inch Hoosier tyres. There were no longer any classes catering to Formula Renault or Formula 4 machinery.

Nano López, driving for TS Corse, won the overall championship with two races to spare and in doing so also became the Rookie Champion. Formula Motorsport driver Laurent Wuthrich claimed the Gentleman Drivers' Championship one race later.

=== Teams and drivers ===
Team	No.	Driver	Status	Rounds
(France) Formula Motorsport	2	(Switzerland) Walter Rykart	G	All
(France) Formula Motorsport	3	(France) Hugo Martiniello	R	6
(France) Formula Motorsport	23	(France) Dylan Estre	R	All
(France) Formula Motorsport	83	(Switzerland) Aubin Robert-Prince	G	1–2, 6
(France) Formula Motorsport	86	(Switzerland) Laurent Wuthrich	G	All
(France) Race Motorsport	4	(France) Frédéric Boillot	G	All
(France) Winfield Racing	7	(United States) André Rodriguez	R	6
(France) Winfield Racing	10	(Australia) Craig McLatchey	G	1–3, 5–6
(France) Winfield Racing	22	(Australia) Hugh Barter	R	1–5
(France) Winfield Racing	38	(France) Aleksandr Burdo	R	4–6
(France) Winfield Racing	58	(Belgium) Aaron Ferrazzano	R	All
(France) Graff Racing	9	(Portugal) Alexandre Lima	G	1
(France) Krafft Racing	17	(France) Yann Lavocat	G	3
(France) Rever'Team	18	(France) Gilles Depierre	G	1–3, 5–6
(Italy) TS Corse	24	(Argentina) Nano López	R	All
(Italy) TS Corse	25	(Chile) Clemente Huerta	R	6
(France) Lamo Racing Car	33	(France) Thierry Malhomme	G	1–4, 6
(France) Lamo Racing Car	68	(United Arab Emirates) Alain Bucher	G	All
(France) Lamo Racing Car	95	(France) Solenn Amrouche	R	All
(France) Kennol Racing Team	49	(France) Frédéric Morihain	G	1, 3, 5–6
(France) Kennol Racing Team	75	(France) Philippe Daric	G	1, 3–5
(Kazakhstan) ART-Line Virage	59	(Paraguay) Mateo Valente	R	All
(Switzerland) Sports Promotion	62	(Switzerland) Christophe Hurni	G	1
(France) STAC Racing	91	(France) Jérémy Clavaud		5–6

Icon	Legend
**R**	Rookie
**G**	Gentleman

=== Race results ===
Round		Circuit	Pole position	Fastest lap	Winning driver	Winning team	Rookie winner	Gentleman winner
1	R1	(France) Circuit Paul Ricard	(Australia) Hugh Barter	(France) Dylan Estre	(Australia) Hugh Barter	(France) Winfield Racing	(Australia) Hugh Barter	(Switzerland) Aubin Robert-Prince
1	R2	(France) Circuit Paul Ricard	(Australia) Hugh Barter	(Argentina) Nano López	(Australia) Hugh Barter	(France) Winfield Racing	(Australia) Hugh Barter	(Switzerland) Christophe Hurni
1	R3	(France) Circuit Paul Ricard		(Australia) Hugh Barter	(Australia) Hugh Barter	(France) Winfield Racing	(Australia) Hugh Barter	(United Arab Emirates) Alain Bucher
2	R1	(Italy) Mugello Circuit	(Argentina) Nano López	(Argentina) Nano López	(Argentina) Nano López	(Italy) TS Corse	(Argentina) Nano López	(Switzerland) Laurent Wuthrich
2	R2	(Italy) Mugello Circuit	(Argentina) Nano López	(Argentina) Nano López	(Argentina) Nano López	(Italy) TS Corse	(Argentina) Nano López	(Switzerland) Walter Rykart
2	R3	(Italy) Mugello Circuit		(Argentina) Nano López	(Australia) Hugh Barter	(France) Winfield Racing	(Australia) Hugh Barter	(Switzerland) Laurent Wuthrich
3	R1	(Portugal) Algarve International Circuit	(Australia) Hugh Barter	(Australia) Hugh Barter	(Australia) Hugh Barter	(France) Winfield Racing	(Australia) Hugh Barter	(Switzerland) Laurent Wuthrich
3	R2	(Portugal) Algarve International Circuit	(Australia) Hugh Barter	(Australia) Hugh Barter	(Australia) Hugh Barter	(France) Winfield Racing	(Australia) Hugh Barter	(Switzerland) Laurent Wuthrich
3	R3	(Portugal) Algarve International Circuit		(Australia) Hugh Barter	(Australia) Hugh Barter	(France) Winfield Racing	(Australia) Hugh Barter	(France) Frédéric Boillot
4	R1	(Spain) Motorland Aragón	(Belgium) Aaron Ferrazzano	(Argentina) Nano López	(Belgium) Aaron Ferrazzano	(France) Winfield Racing	(Belgium) Aaron Ferrazzano	(Switzerland) Laurent Wuthrich
4	R2	(Spain) Motorland Aragón	(Argentina) Nano López	(Argentina) Nano López	(Argentina) Nano López	(Italy) TS Corse	(Argentina) Nano López	(Switzerland) Laurent Wuthrich
4	R3	(Spain) Motorland Aragón		(Belgium) Aaron Ferrazzano	(Belgium) Aaron Ferrazzano	(France) Winfield Racing	(Belgium) Aaron Ferrazzano	(Switzerland) Laurent Wuthrich
5	R1	(France) Circuit de Nevers Magny-Cours	(Australia) Hugh Barter	(Australia) Hugh Barter	(Australia) Hugh Barter	(France) Winfield Racing	(Australia) Hugh Barter	(Switzerland) Laurent Wuthrich
5	R2	(France) Circuit de Nevers Magny-Cours	(Australia) Hugh Barter	(Argentina) Nano López	(France) Dylan Estre	(France) Formula Motorsport	(France) Dylan Estre	(Switzerland) Laurent Wuthrich
5	R3	(France) Circuit de Nevers Magny-Cours		(Australia) Hugh Barter	(Australia) Hugh Barter	(France) Winfield Racing	(Australia) Hugh Barter	(Switzerland) Laurent Wuthrich
6	R1	(France) Circuit Paul Ricard	(Belgium) Aaron Ferrazzano	(Argentina) Nano López	(Belgium) Aaron Ferrazzano	(France) Winfield Racing	(Belgium) Aaron Ferrazzano	(Switzerland) Laurent Wuthrich
6	R2	(France) Circuit Paul Ricard	(Belgium) Aaron Ferrazzano	(Belgium) Aaron Ferrazzano	(France) Dylan Estre	(France) Formula Motorsport	(France) Dylan Estre	(Switzerland) Aubin Robert-Prince
6	R3	(France) Circuit Paul Ricard		(Belgium) Aaron Ferrazzano	(Argentina) Nano López	(Italy) TS Corse	(Argentina) Nano López	(Switzerland) Laurent Wuthrich

=== Standings ===
==== Scoring system ====
Points were awarded to all finishers as follows:

Position	**1st**	**2nd**	**3rd**	**4th**	**5th**	**6th**	**7th**	**8th**	**9th**	**10th**	**11th**	**12th**	**13th**	**14th**	**15th**	**16th**	**17th**	**18th**	**19th**	**20th**
Points	28	24	20	17	16	15	14	13	12	11	10	9	8	7	6	5	4	3	2	1

- If a driver completed less than 75% percent, but more than 50% of the laps (rounded down) the driver classified first in their class completed, they were awarded half points.
- A driver not completing at least 50% of the distance of the driver classified first in their class did not score any points.
- Should the driver classified first in a class not complete at least 50% of the distance of the driver classified first overall, no driver in said class scored points towards the class standings.
- Should a driver be the only competitor in a class, they had to have completed at least 50% of the distance of the driver classified first overall to score any points towards said class.

==== Overall standings ====
Pos	Driver	LEC1 (France)			MUG (Italy)			POR (Portugal)			ARA (Spain)			MAG (France)			LEC2 (France)			Pts
Pos	Driver	R1	R2	R3	R1	R2	R3	R1	R2	R3	R1	R2	R3	R1	R2	R3	R1	R2	R3	Pts
1	(Argentina) Nano López	3	3	2	**1**	**1**	2	2	2	2	8	**1**	2	4	2	4	2	4	1	411
2	(Belgium) Aaron Ferrazzano	5	4	3	4	5	4	DNS	11	4	**1**	4	1	3	3	3	**1**	**2**	7	333
3	(France) Dylan Estre	2	2	4	2	3	3	3	12	3	9	Ret	4	2	1	2	4	1	Ret	316
4	(Australia) Hugh Barter	**1**	**1**	1	3	2	1	**1**	**1**	1	WD	WD	WD	**1**	**Ret**	1				296
5	(Paraguay) Mateo Valente	4	5	Ret	6	4	5	4	3	5	Ret	2	3	5	4	5	3	3	Ret	268
6	(Switzerland) Laurent Wuthrich	Ret	7	16	5	Ret	6	6	5	10	2	5	7	7	6	7	7	7	4	234
7	(France) Solenn Amrouche	10	11	5	7	6	8	5	4	6	3	6	6	8	7	11	DNS	10	14	232
8	(France) Frédéric Boillot	11	10	8	9	8	7	9	8	7	6	8	9	11	8	8	12	8	12	219
9	(Switzerland) Walter Rykart	13	14	10	8	7	9	10	7	14	5	10	8	9	9	10	10	11	13	201
10	(United Arab Emirates) Alain Bucher	8	12	6	10	9	11	11	10	9	DNS	7	12	10	11	Ret	13	12	11	174
11	(France) Gilles Depierre	9	13	11	12	11	10	8	9	8	7	11	10	12	Ret	DNS	DNS	DNS	DNS	142
12	(Australia) Craig McLatchey	15*	17	9	13	Ret	WD	7	6	13				13	12	9	11	DNS	10	114
13	(France) Thierry Malhomme	Ret	16	13	11	10	DNS	Ret	14	11	10	9	11				14	13	Ret	99
14	(Switzerland) Aubin Robert-Prince	6	8	12	WD	WD	WD										8	5	6	81
15	(France) Frédéric Morihain	12	9	15				DNS	DNS	DNS				14†	10	DNS	9	9	9	81
16	(France) Jérémy Clavaud													6	5	6	15	Ret	3	72
17	(France) Aleksandr Burdo										4	3	5	WD	WD	WD	WD	WD	WD	53
18	(Switzerland) Christophe Hurni	7	6	7																43
19	(United States) André Rodriguez																5	Ret	2	40
20	(France) Philippe Daric	14	18	17				12	13	12	WD	WD	WD	WD	WD	WD				40
21	(France) Hugo Martiniello																6	Ret	5	31
22	(Chile) Clemente Huerta																Ret	6	8	28
23	(Portugal) Alexandre Lima	Ret	15	14																13
—	(France) Yann Lavocat							WD	WD	WD										0
Pos	Driver	R1	R2	R3	R1	R2	R3	R1	R2	R3	R1	R2	R3	R1	R2	R3	R1	R2	R3	Pts
Pos	Driver	LEC1 (France)			MUG (Italy)			POR (Portugal)			ARA (Spain)			MAG (France)			LEC2 (France)			Pts

Key
Colour	Result
Gold	Winner
Silver	Second place
Bronze	Third place
Green	Other points position
Blue	Other classified position
Blue	Not classified, finished (NC)
Purple	Not classified, retired (Ret)
Red	Did not qualify (DNQ)
Red	Did not pre-qualify (DNPQ)
Black	Disqualified (DSQ)
White	Did not start (DNS)
White	Race cancelled (C)
Blank	Did not practice (DNP)
Blank	Excluded (EX)
Blank	Did not arrive (DNA)
Blank	Withdrawn (WD)
Blank	Did not enter (cell empty)
Text formatting	Meaning
**Bold**	Pole position
Italics	Fastest lap

* - half points

==== Rookie class standings ====
Pos	Driver	LEC1 (France)			MUG (Italy)			POR (Portugal)			ARA (Spain)			MAG (France)			LEC2 (France)			Pts
Pos	Driver	R1	R2	R3	R1	R2	R3	R1	R2	R3	R1	R2	R3	R1	R2	R3	R1	R2	R3	Pts
1	(Argentina) Nano López	3	3	2	1	1	2	2	2	2	4	1	2	4	2	4	2	4	1	415
2	(Belgium) Aaron Ferrazzano	5	4	3	4	5	4	DNS	5	4	1	4	1	3	3	3	1	2	4	342
3	(France) Dylan Estre	2	2	4	2	3	3	3	6	3	5	Ret	4	2	1	2	4	1	Ret	330
4	(Australia) Hugh Barter	1	1	1	3	2	1	1	1	1	WD	WD	WD	1	Ret	1				296
5	(France) Solenn Amrouche	6	6	5	6	6	6	5	4	6	2	5	6	6	5	6	DNS	6	6	270
6	(Paraguay) Mateo Valente	4	5	Ret	5	4	5	4	3	5	Ret	2	3	5	4	5	3	3	Ret	268
7	(France) Aleksandr Burdo										3	3	5	WD	WD	WD	WD	WD	WD	56
8	(United States) André Rodriguez																5	Ret	2	40
9	(France) Hugo Martiniello																6	Ret	3	35
10	(Chile) Clemente Huerta																Ret	5	5	32
Pos	Driver	R1	R2	R3	R1	R2	R3	R1	R2	R3	R1	R2	R3	R1	R2	R3	R1	R2	R3	Pts
Pos	Driver	LEC1 (France)			MUG (Italy)			POR (Portugal)			ARA (Spain)			MAG (France)			LEC2 (France)			Pts

==== Gentleman driver standings ====
Pos	Driver	LEC1 (France)			MUG (Italy)			POR (Portugal)			ARA (Spain)			MAG (France)			LEC2 (France)			Pts
Pos	Driver	R1	R2	R3	R1	R2	R3	R1	R2	R3	R1	R2	R3	R1	R2	R3	R1	R2	R3	Pts
1	(Switzerland) Laurent Wuthrich	Ret	2	11	1	Ret	1	1	1	4	1	1	1	1	1	1	1	2	1	411
2	(France) Frédéric Boillot	5	5	3	3	2	2	4	4	1	3	3	3	4	2	2	6	3	6	357
3	(Switzerland) Walter Rykart	7	8	5	2	1	3	5	3	8	2	5	2	2	3	4	4	5	7	336
4	(United Arab Emirates) Alain Bucher	3	6	1	4	3	5	6	6	3	DNS	2	6	3	5	Ret	7	6	5	286
5	(France) Gilles Depierre	4	7	6	6	5	4	3	5	2	4	6	4	5	Ret	DNS	DNS	DNS	DNS	219
6	(Australia) Craig McLatchey	9*	11	4	7	Ret	WD	2	2	7				6	6	3	5	DNS	4	192
7	(France) Thierry Malhomme	Ret	10	8	5	4	DNS	Ret	8	5	5	4	5				8	8	Ret	161
8	(Switzerland) Aubin Robert-Prince	1	3	7	WD	WD	WD										2	1	2	138
9	(France) Frédéric Morihain	6	4	10				DNS	DNS	DNS				7†	4	DNS	3	4	3	131
10	(Switzerland) Christophe Hurni	2	1	2																76
11	(France) Philippe Daric	8	12	12				7	7	6	WD	WD	WD	WD	WD	WD				74
12	(Portugal) Alexandre Lima	Ret	9	9																24
—	(France) Yann Lavocat							WD	WD	WD										0
Pos	Driver	R1	R2	R3	R1	R2	R3	R1	R2	R3	R1	R2	R3	R1	R2	R3	R1	R2	R3	Pts
Pos	Driver	LEC1 (France)			MUG (Italy)			POR (Portugal)			ARA (Spain)			MAG (France)			LEC2 (France)			Pts
