= YRB Racing =

American sports car racing team

(United States) YRB Racing
- Founded: 2026
- Base: Millville, New Jersey, U.S.
- Team principal(s): Christopher Deely
- Current series: Asian Le Mans Series; IMSA SportsCar Championship; Michelin Pilot Challenge
- Current drivers: Asian Le Mans Series: (United Kingdom) Jonny Edgar (France) Valentin Hasse-Clot (France) Arnold Robin; IMSA SportsCar Championship: (France) Valentin Hasse-Clot (Denmark) Marco Sørensen
- Website: Official website

YRB Racing LLC, competing as Car Blanche, is an American sports car racing team that competes in the GTD Pro class of the IMSA SportsCar Championship, and in the GT3 class of the Asian Le Mans Series.

The team was established mid-way through 2026 after acquiring van der Steur Racing.

== History ==
The team traces its origins to a Delaware-based limited liability company (LLC) called YRB Racing LLC. In early 2026, YRB Racing LLC and its investors purchased 4,838 shares (1.35%) in AMR Grand Prix Holdings, the company that owns the Aston Martin F1 team, for over £32 million. YRB Racing's 1.35% investment placed the F1 team at a £2.4 billion valuation.

In June 2026, ahead of that year's 6 Hours of Watkins Glen, the company announced that it acquired van der Steur Racing and all of the team's assets. They continued running VDSR's 2026 programs in the IMSA SportsCar Championship and the Michelin Pilot Challenge, and VDSR team principal Christopher Deely remained with YRB Racing in the same role.

=== Michelin Pilot Challenge ===
YRB Racing kept van der Steur Racing's existing lineup of Trenton Estep and Allen Patten heading into the team's first race at Watkins Glen. They finished a season best fifth in class, and immediately improved to a fourth place finish in class at CTMP. At Road America, Estep and Patten qualified ninth in class. During the race, they rose up the order thanks to pit stop strategy. With 18 minutes in the race remaining, they took the lead just before a caution came out. Estep and Patten went on to secure their first win of the season. This also marked YRB Racing's maiden win as an organization. Following a disappointing final three races of the season, the team finished tenth in the championship.

=== IMSA SportsCar Championship ===
==== 2026 ====
Prior to their first IMSA SportCar Championship event at Watkins Glen, the team revised their driver lineup for the weekend, bringing back Valentin Hasse-Clot, as well as adding Trenton Estep and Marius Fossard. Following the team's first race, the trio finished on the podium in third. Ahead of the Chevrolet Grand Prix at CTMP, YRB Racing entered a GTD Pro class entry with Hasse-Clot and Scott Andrews. They qualified in fifth and finished the race in tenth. Switching back to the GTD class for Road America with Estep, Fossard, and Hasse-Clot, the team finished on the podium once more with a third place in class. Following the event, the team permanently switched to GTD Pro for the rest of the 2026 season. Marco Sørensen joined Hasse-Clot ahead of VIR, and the duo finished a solid fourth in class. For the final round of the season at Road Atlanta, the team added Aston Martin factory driver Mattia Drudi to its existing lineup of Hasse-Clot and Sørensen. In qualifying, Drudi placed the car into an impressive second, behind the championship leading No. 1 Paul Miller Racing BMW. The drivers converted this pace into a win, securing YRB Racing's maiden IMSA SportsCar Championship victory in the team's first Michelin Endurance Cup GTD Pro start.

==== 2027 ====
After team principal Christopher Deely stated the team's intentions to compete in IMSA's GTD Pro class in 2027, YRB Racing were confirmed as a full-time entry in GTD Pro for the 2027 season. Valentin Hasse-Clot and Marco Sørensen returned to the team to compete full-time in the No. 68 Aston Martin Vantage AMR GT3 Evo.

=== Asian Le Mans Series ===
YRB Racing expanded into the Asian Le Mans Series for the 2026–27 season, partnering up with French squad Racing Spirit of Léman to field an entry in the GT3 class. Jonny Edgar, Valentin Hasse-Clot, and Arnold Robin joined the team as its drivers for the season.

== Current series results ==
=== Complete Michelin Pilot Challenge results ===
(key) (Races in bold indicate pole position; races in italics indicate fastest lap)

Year	Entrant	Class	No	Chassis	Engine	Drivers	1	2	3	4	5	6	7	8	9	10	Pos.	Pts
2026	(United States) Thunder Bunny Racing (1) (United States) van der Steur Racing (2–4) (United States) Car Blanche (5–8) (United States) OORE (9–10)	GS	66	Aston Martin Vantage AMR GT4 Evo	Aston Martin M177 4.0 L Turbo V8	(United States) Trenton Estep (United States) Allen Patten	DAY; 16	SEB; 14	LAG; 12	MDO; 9	WGL; 5	MOS; 4	ELK; 1	VIR; 22	IND; 31	ATL; 20	10th	1830

=== Complete IMSA SportsCar Championship results ===
(key) (Races in bold indicate pole position; races in italics indicate fastest lap)

Year	Entrant	Class	No	Chassis	Engine	Drivers	1	2	3	4	5	6	7	8	9	10	Pos.	Pts
2026	(United States) van der Steur Racing (1–4) (United States) Car Blanche (6, 8)	GTD	19 (1–4); 68 (6, 8)	Aston Martin Vantage AMR GT3 Evo	Aston Martin M177 4.0 L Turbo V8	(United States) Trenton Estep (United States) Rory van der Steur (France) Marius Fossard (France) Valentin Hasse-Clot (France) Sébastien Baud (Thailand) Carl Bennett (Australia) Scott Andrews	DAY; 11	SEB; 13	LBH; 8	LGA; 10	WGL; 3	MOS	ELK; 3	VIR	IMS	PET	14th	1543
2026	(United States) Car Blanche	GTD Pro	68	Aston Martin Vantage AMR GT3 Evo	Aston Martin M177 4.0 L Turbo V8	(France) Valentin Hasse-Clot (Denmark) Marco Sørensen (Australia) Scott Andrews (Italy) Mattia Drudi	DAY	SEB	LGA	DET	WGL	MOS; 10	ELK	VIR; 4	IMS; 9	PET; 1	13th	1144
2027	(United States) Car Blanche	GTD Pro	68	Aston Martin Vantage AMR GT3 Evo	Aston Martin M177 4.0 L Turbo V8	(France) Valentin Hasse-Clot (Denmark) Marco Sørensen	DAY	SEB	LGA	DET	WGL	MOS	ELK	VIR	IMS	PET		

=== Complete Asian Le Mans Series results ===
(key) (Races in bold indicate pole position; races in italics indicate fastest lap)

Year	Entrant	Class	No	Chassis	Engine	Drivers	1	2	3	4	5	6	Pos.	Pts
2026–27	(France) Car Blanche by RSL	GT3	68	Aston Martin Vantage AMR GT3 Evo	Aston Martin M177 4.0 L Turbo V8	(United Kingdom) Jonny Edgar (France) Valentin Hasse-Clot (France) Arnold Robin	LEC; 1; 8	LEC; 2; 10	JER; 1	JER; 2	POR; 1	POR; 2	13th*	5*

* Season still in progress.
