= Marius Fossard =

French racing driver (born 2004)

- Fossard at Silverstone Circuit in 2026.
- Nationality: (France) French
- Born: 12 May 2004 (age 22) Paris, France

European Le Mans Series career
- Debut season: 2025
- Categorisation: FIA Silver
- Former teams: Racing Spirit of Léman
- Starts: 12
- Wins: 0
- Podiums: 1
- Poles: 1
- Fastest laps: 1
- Best finish: 11th in 2025 (LMP3)

IMSA SportsCar Championship career
- Debut season: 2026
- Starts: 2
- Wins: 0
- Podiums: 2
- Poles: 0
- Fastest laps: 0
- Best finish: 49th in 2026 (GTD Pro)

Previous series
- 2024–2025 2024–2025 2022–2023 2022 2022: Le Mans Cup; Ultimate Cup Series; Trophée MitJet 2L France; Trophée MitJet 2L Italia; Trophée MitJet 2L Benelux Central

Marius Jean-Marie Georges Désiré Fossard (born 12 May 2004) is a French racing driver who most recently competed in the LMGT3 class of the European Le Mans Series for Racing Spirit of Léman and in the GTD class of the IMSA SportsCar Championship for Car Blanche.

== Career ==
=== Trophée MitJet 2L ===
Having made his debut in the Trophée MitJet 2L France in 2021, Fossard signed up to contest a full season of the championship in 2022. He won a race as part of the VPS Racing team led by Matthieu Vaxivière and Aurélien Panis. Fossard took part in the Porsche Carrera Cup France shootout at the end of 2022, though the competition was ultimately won by Mathys Jaubert. In 2023, Fossard returned to the MitJet France trophy with VPS and finished second in the overall standings.

=== Le Mans Cup ===
For the 2024 season, Fossard stepped into prototype racing, driving in the LMP3 class of the Le Mans Cup. Partnering gentleman driver Christophe Lapierre, Fossard ended up 19th in the standings, with a best race finish of fifth at Spa-Francorchamps. After the Le Mans Cup season concluded, Fossard tested an Oreca 07 LMP2 car for Inter Europol Competition, as well as an Aston Martin Vantage AMR GT3 Evo for Racing Spirit of Léman.

=== Ultimate Cup Series ===
==== 2024 ====
Fossard also drove in four races of the European Endurance Prototype Cup as part of the Ultimate Cup Series's schedule, scoring a pole position in the Algarve alongside Manuel Espírito Santo and Bernardo Pinheiro. Despite Fossard showing capable pace in the early stint, the team dropped from third to fifth in the LMP3 class owing to a late pit stop.

==== 2025 ====
At the end of 2025, Fossard contested the final round of the GT Endurance Cup of the Ultimate Cup Series at Circuit Paul Ricard, winning the race alongside former teammate Christophe Lapierre and Porsche professional Alessandro Ghiretti.

=== European Le Mans Series ===
==== 2025 ====
Fossard stepped up to the European Le Mans Series in 2025, partnering amateur drivers Jean-Ludovic Foubert and Marius Wolff at Racing Spirit of Léman. The trio finished a lowly eleventh in the standings, but scored a podium at Imola with second place.

==== 2026 ====
Fossard returned to the series for the 2026 season, rejoining Racing Spirit of Léman, this time in the LMGT3 category with an Aston Martin Vantage AMR GT3 Evo. Frenchman Valentin Hasse-Clot and Clément Mateu joined Fossard as teammates. for the full season.

=== IMSA SportsCar Championship ===
Mid-way through the 2026 IMSA SportsCar Championship, Fossard joined the newly established Car Blanche squad in the GTD class. Valentin Hasse-Clot and Trenton Estep joined the team alongside Fossard. He secured a podium finish of third in his championship debut at Watkins Glen. At Road America, Fossard once again finished on the podium in third.

== Racing record ==
=== Racing career summary ===
Season	Series	Team	Races	Wins	Poles	F/Laps	Podiums	Points	Position
2022	Trophée MitJet 2L France	VPS Racing	24	1	2	3	6	237.5	7th
2022	Trophée MitJet 2L Benelux Central		12	1	?	?	3	?	?
2022	Trophée MitJet 2L Italia		8	1	?	?	2	?	?
2023	Trophée MitJet 2L France	VPS Racing	?	?	?	?	?	?	**2nd**
2024	Le Mans Cup - LMP3	Racing Spirit of Léman	7	0	0	0	0	12	19th
2024	European Endurance Prototype Cup - LMP3	Bretton Racing	2	0	1	0	0	32	10th
2024	European Endurance Prototype Cup - LMP3	Team Virage	2	0	0	0	0	32	10th
2025	European Le Mans Series - LMP3	Racing Spirit of Léman	6	0	0	0	1	37	11th
2025	European Endurance Prototype Cup	Racing Spirit of Léman	1	0	0	0	0	0.5	71st
2025	Ultimate GT Endurance Cup - Porsche Cup	GP Racing Team	1	1	0	0	1	?	?
2025	Le Mans Cup - LMP3	Bretton Racing	2	0	0	0	0	0	NC†
2026	European Le Mans Series - LMGT3	Racing Spirit of Léman	6	0	1	1	0	17	21st
2026	24 Hours of Le Mans - LMGT3	Racing Spirit of Léman	1	0	0	0	0	N/A	11th
2026	Le Mans Cup - GT3	Racing Spirit of Léman	1	0	0	0	0	12	18th
2026	IMSA SportsCar Championship - GTD	Car Blanche	2	0	0	0	2	630	49th

^{†} As Fossard was a guest driver, he was ineligible for championship points.
* Season still in progress.

=== Complete Le Mans Cup results ===
(key) (Races in bold indicate pole position; results in italics indicate fastest lap)

Year	Entrant	Class	Chassis	1	2	3	4	5	6	7	Rank	Points
2024	Racing Spirit of Léman	LMP3	Ligier JS P320	CAT; Ret	LEC; 10	LMS; 1; 27	LMS; 2 Ret	SPA; 5	MUG; Ret	ALG; 17	19th	12
2025	Bretton Racing	LMP3	Ligier JS P325	CAT	LEC	LMS; 1 Ret	LMS; 2; 12	SPA	SIL	ALG	NC†	0
2026	Racing Spirit of Léman	GT3	Aston Martin Vantage AMR GT3 Evo	CAT	LEC	LMS	SPA; 4	SIL	ALG		18th	12

=== Complete European Le Mans Series results ===
(key) (Races in bold indicate pole position; results in italics indicate fastest lap)

Year	Entrant	Class	Chassis	Engine	1	2	3	4	5	6	Rank	Points
2025	Racing Spirit of Léman	LMP3	Ligier JS P325	Toyota V35A 3.5 L V6	CAT; 7	LEC; 7	IMO; 2	SPA; 9	SIL; 8	POR; 10	11th	37
2026	Racing Spirit of Léman	LMGT3	Aston Martin Vantage AMR GT3 Evo	Aston Martin M177 4.0 L Turbo V8	CAT; 10	LEC; 9	IMO; Ret	**SPA**; 12	SIL; 10	ALG; 4	21st	17

^{*} Season still in progress.

=== Complete 24 Hours of Le Mans results ===
Year	Team	Co-Drivers	Car	Class	Laps	Pos.	Class Pos.
2026	(France) Racing Spirit of Léman	(France) Valentin Hasse-Clot (France) Clément Mateu	Aston Martin Vantage AMR GT3 Evo	LMGT3	332	43rd	11th

=== Complete IMSA SportsCar Championship results ===
(key) (Races in bold indicate pole position; races in italics indicate fastest lap)

Year	Entrant	Class	Chassis	Engine	1	2	3	4	5	6	7	8	9	10	Rank	Points
2026	Car Blanche	GTD	Aston Martin Vantage AMR GT3 Evo	Aston Martin M177 4.0 L Turbo V8	DAY	SEB	LGA	DET	WGL; 3	MOS	ELK; 3	VIR	IMS	PET	49th	630

^{*} Season still in progress.
