= Antoine Doquin =

French racing driver (born 2004)

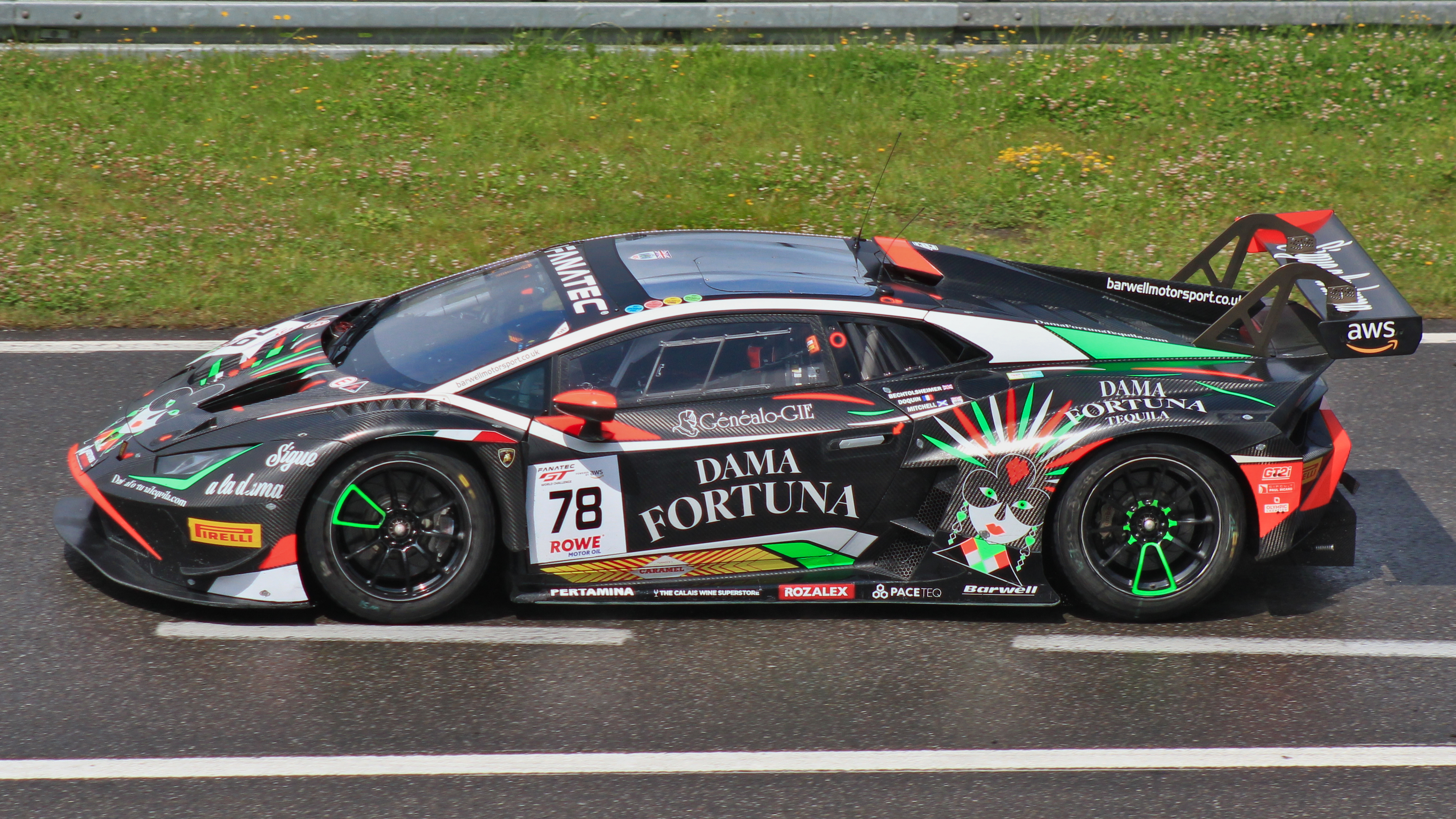
- Nationality: (France) French
- Born: 16 September 2004 (age 22) France

European Le Mans Series career
- Debut season: 2021
- Current team: Racing Spirit of Léman
- Categorisation: FIA Bronze (2021); FIA Silver (2022–)
- Car number: 31
- Former teams: Eurointernational, Cool Racing
- Starts: 8 (8 entries)
- Wins: 0
- Podiums: 3
- Poles: 0
- Fastest laps: 0
- Best finish: 7th (LMP3) in 2022

Previous series
- 2022 2022 2021: IMSA SportsCar Championship; Asian Le Mans Series; Le Mans Cup

Championship titles
- 2022: Asian Le Mans Series - LMP3

Antoine Doquin (born 16 September 2004) is a French racing driver currently competing in the European Le Mans Series with Racing Spirit of Léman.

== Racing record ==
=== Racing career summary ===
Season	Series	Team	Races	Wins	Poles	F/Laps	Podiums	Points	Position
2021	Le Mans Cup - LMP3	Cool Racing	7	1	3	0	1	38.5	7th
2021	European Le Mans Series - LMP3	Eurointernational	1	0	0	0	0	4	35th
2022	Asian Le Mans Series - LMP3	CD Sport	4	0	0	0	4	69	**1st**
2022	European Le Mans Series - LMP3	Cool Racing	6	0	0	0	2	53	7th
2022	IMSA SportsCar Championship - LMP3	Forty7 Motorsports	1	0	0	0	0	0	NC†
2022–23	Middle East Trophy - GT3	Saintéloc Racing	1	0	0	0	0	0	NC†
2023	European Le Mans Series - LMP3	Racing Spirit of Léman	6	1	0	0	2	54	5th
2023	Le Mans Cup - LMP3	Racing Spirit of Léman	3	0	0	0	0	0	33rd
2023	GT World Challenge Europe Endurance Cup	Saintéloc Junior Team	1	0	0	0	0	0	NC
2023	24H GT Series - GT3	Saintéloc Junior Team	1	1	0	0	1	40*	7th*
2024	European Le Mans Series - LMP3	Racing Spirit of Léman	6	0	0	0	1	44	9th
2024	GT World Challenge Europe Endurance Cup	Barwell Motorsport	4	0	0	0	0	0	NC
2025	International GT Open	Oregon Team	9	0	0	0	0	11	21st
2025	Le Mans Cup - LMP3	R-ace GP	3	0	0	0	0	6	18th
2025	Le Mans Cup - LMP3 Pro-Am	Racing Spirit of Léman	1	0	0	0	0	6	25th
2026	GT World Challenge Europe Endurance Cup	Steller Motorsport	4	0	0	0	0	0	NC
2026	Nürburgring Langstrecken-Serie - BMW M240i	Adrenalin Motorsport Team Mainhattan Wheels							

^{†} As Doquin was a guest driver, he was ineligible to score points.

=== Complete Le Mans Cup results ===
(key) (Races in bold indicate pole position; results in italics indicate fastest lap)

Year	Entrant	Class	Chassis	1	2	3	4	5	6	7	Rank	Points
2021	Cool Racing	LMP3	Ligier JS P320	**CAT**; 11	**LEC**; Ret	MNZ; 7	LMS; 1; 7	LMS; 2; 17	SPA; 1	**ALG**; 15	7th	38.5
2023	Racing Spirit of Léman	LMP3	Ligier JS P320	CAT	LMS; 1; 5	LMS; 2 Ret	LEC	ARA; Ret	SPA	ALG	33rd	0
2025	Racing Spirit of Léman	LMP3 Pro-Am	Ligier JS P325	CAT	LEC; 7	LMS; 1	LMS; 2				25th	6
2025	R-ace GP	LMP3	Duqueine D09					SPA; 7	SIL; 11	ALG; 12	18th	6

^{*} Season still in progress.

=== Complete European Le Mans Series results ===
(key) (Races in bold indicate pole position; results in italics indicate fastest lap)

Year	Entrant	Class	Chassis	Engine	1	2	3	4	5	6	Rank	Points
2021	Eurointernational	LMP3	Ligier JS P320	Nissan VK56DE 5.6L V8	CAT	RBR	LEC	MNZ	SPA	ALG; 9	35th	4
2022	Cool Racing	LMP3	Ligier JS P320	Nissan VK56DE 5.6L V8	LEC; Ret	IMO; 2	MNZ; 6	CAT; Ret	SPA; 4	ALG; 3	7th	53
2023	Racing Spirit of Léman	LMP3	Ligier JS P320	Nissan VK56DE 5.6 L V8	CAT; 3	LEC; 1	ARA; Ret	SPA; 8	PRT; 8	ALG; 7	5th	54
2024	Racing Spirit of Léman	LMP3	Ligier JS P320	Nissan VK56DE 5.6L V8	CAT; 7	LEC; 6	IMO; Ret	SPA; 2	MUG; 4	ALG; Ret	9th	44

=== Complete GT World Challenge Europe results ===
==== GT World Challenge Europe Endurance Cup ====
(key) (Races in bold indicate pole position; results in italics indicate fastest lap)

Year	Team	Car	Class	1	2	3	4	5	6	7	Pos.	Points
2023	Saintéloc Junior Team	Audi R8 LMS Evo II	Silver	MNZ	LEC	SPA; 6H; 47	SPA; 12H; 43	SPA; 24H; 30	NÜR	CAT	14th	22
2024	Barwell Motorsport	Lamborghini Huracán GT3 Evo 2	Bronze	LEC; 29	SPA; 6H; 42	SPA; 12H; 50	SPA; 24H; 35	NÜR; 29	MNZ; Ret	JED	20th	20
2026	Steller Motorsport	Chevrolet Corvette Z06 GT3.R	Gold	LEC; 38	MNZ; 26	SPA; 6H; 58	SPA; 12H; 45	SPA; 24H; 41	NÜR; 21	ALG	9th	43

=== Complete International GT Open results ===
(key) (Races in bold indicate pole position; results in italics indicate fastest lap)

Year	Team	Car	Class	1	2	3	4	5	6	7	8	9	10	11	12	13	14	Pos.	Points
2025	Oregon Team	Lamborghini Huracán GT3 Evo 2	Pro	ALG; 1; 12	ALG; 2; 16	SPA; 9	HOC; 1; 11	HOC; 2; 10	HUN; 1; 18	HUN; 2; 16	LEC; 1; 9	LEC; 2; 7	RBR; 1	RBR; 2	CAT; 1	CAT; 2	MNZ	21st	11
