= 2027 IMSA SportsCar Championship =

Motor racing championship

The 2027 IMSA SportsCar Championship (known for sponsorship reasons as the 2027 IMSA WeatherTech SportsCar Championship) will be a motor racing championship, which is the 57th racing season sanctioned by the International Motor Sports Association and traces its lineage back to the 1971 IMSA GT Championship. It is also the fourteenth season of the IMSA SportsCar Championship since the merger between the American Le Mans Series and the Rolex Sports Car Series in 2014, and the twelfth under the sponsorship of WeatherTech.

== Classes ==
- Grand Touring Prototype (GTP) (LMDh and LMH)
- Le Mans Prototype 2 (LMP2)
- GT Daytona Pro (GTD Pro)
- GT Daytona (GTD)

== Schedule ==
The provisional schedule was released on March 19, 2026, and features 11 rounds. The only notable change to the calendar is that the Rolex 24 at Daytona will be held one week later compared to last year. On August 25, 2026, the event organizers of the Motul SportsCar Endurance Grand Prix confirmed the race would be held a week later on August 8.

Race is part of the Michelin Endurance Cup

Rnd.	Race	Length	Classes	Circuit	Location	Date
1	Rolex 24 at Daytona	24 hours	All	Daytona International Speedway	Daytona Beach, Florida	January 30/31
2	Mobil 1 Twelve Hours of Sebring	12 hours	All	Sebring International Raceway	Sebring, Florida	March 20
3	Acura Grand Prix of Long Beach	1 hour, 40 minutes	GTP, GTD	Long Beach Street Circuit	Long Beach, California	April 17
4	StubHub Monterey SportsCar Championship	2 hours, 40 minutes	GTP, GTD Pro, GTD	WeatherTech Raceway Laguna Seca	Monterey, California	May 2
5	Chevrolet Detroit Sports Car Classic	1 hour, 40 minutes	GTP, GTD Pro	Detroit Street Circuit	Detroit, Michigan	June 5
6	Sahlen's Six Hours of The Glen	6 hours	All	Watkins Glen International	Watkins Glen, New York	June 27
7	Chevrolet Grand Prix	2 hours, 40 minutes	LMP2, GTD Pro, GTD	Canadian Tire Motorsport Park	Bowmanville, Ontario	July 11
8	Motul SportsCar Endurance Grand Prix	6 hours	All	Road America	Elkhart Lake, Wisconsin	August 8
9	Michelin GT Challenge at VIR	2 hours, 40 minutes	GTD Pro, GTD	Virginia International Raceway	Alton, Virginia	August 22
10	Tirerack.com Battle on the Bricks	2 hours, 40 minutes	All	Indianapolis Motor Speedway	Speedway, Indiana	September 19
11	Motul Petit Le Mans	10 hours	All	Michelin Raceway Road Atlanta	Braselton, Georgia	October 9

== Entries ==
=== Grand Touring Prototype (GTP) ===
Team	Chassis	Engine	No.	Drivers	Rounds
(United States) Cadillac Wayne Taylor Racing	Cadillac V-Series.R	Cadillac LMC55R 5.5 L V8	10	(Portugal) Filipe Albuquerque	TBC
(United States) Cadillac Wayne Taylor Racing	Cadillac V-Series.R	Cadillac LMC55R 5.5 L V8	10	(United Kingdom) Will Stevens	TBC
(United States) Cadillac Wayne Taylor Racing	Cadillac V-Series.R	Cadillac LMC55R 5.5 L V8	10	(United States) Ricky Taylor	TBC
(United States) Cadillac Wayne Taylor Racing	Cadillac V-Series.R	Cadillac LMC55R 5.5 L V8	40	(Switzerland) Louis Deletraz	TBC
(United States) Cadillac Wayne Taylor Racing	Cadillac V-Series.R	Cadillac LMC55R 5.5 L V8	40	(France) Norman Nato	TBC
(United States) Cadillac Wayne Taylor Racing	Cadillac V-Series.R	Cadillac LMC55R 5.5 L V8	40	(United States) Jordan Taylor	TBC
(United States) Whelen Engineering Cadillac Racing	Cadillac V-Series.R	Cadillac LMC55R 5.5 L V8	31	(United Kingdom) Jack Aitken	TBC
(United States) Whelen Engineering Cadillac Racing	Cadillac V-Series.R	Cadillac LMC55R 5.5 L V8	31	(New Zealand) Earl Bamber	TBC
(United States) Whelen Engineering Cadillac Racing	Cadillac V-Series.R	Cadillac LMC55R 5.5 L V8	31	(Denmark) Frederik Vesti	TBC
(United States) Whelen Engineering Cadillac Racing	Cadillac V-Series.R	Cadillac LMC55R 5.5 L V8	31	TBA	TBC

=== Le Mans Prototype 2 (LMP2) ===
In accordance with the 2017 LMP2 regulations, all cars in the LMP2 class use the Gibson GK428 V8 engine.

Team	Chassis	No.	Drivers	Rounds
(United States) CrowdStrike Racing by APR	Oreca 07	04	(Denmark) Malthe Jakobsen	TBC
(United States) CrowdStrike Racing by APR	Oreca 07	04	(United States) George Kurtz	TBC
(United States) CrowdStrike Racing by APR	Oreca 07	04	(United Kingdom) Alex Quinn	TBC
(United States) CrowdStrike Racing by APR	Oreca 07	04	(United Kingdom) Toby Sowery	TBC
(United States) United Autosports USA	Oreca 07	2	(Canada) Phil Fayer	TBC
(United States) United Autosports USA	Oreca 07	2	(Denmark) Mikkel Jensen	TBC
(United States) United Autosports USA	Oreca 07	2	(New Zealand) Hunter McElrea	TBC
(United States) United Autosports USA	Oreca 07	2	TBA	TBC
(United States) United Autosports USA	Oreca 07	22	(Mexico) Ian Aguilera	TBC
(United States) United Autosports USA	Oreca 07	22	(United States) Nick Boulle	TBC
(United States) United Autosports USA	Oreca 07	22	(United Kingdom) Paul di Resta	TBC
(United States) United Autosports USA	Oreca 07	22	TBA	TBC
(Canada) Tower Motorsports	Oreca 07	8	(Canada) John Farano	TBC
(Canada) Tower Motorsports	Oreca 07	8	(Australia) Griffin Peebles	TBC
(Canada) Tower Motorsports	Oreca 07	8	(France) Tristan Vautier	TBC
(Canada) Tower Motorsports	Oreca 07	8	(Netherlands) Renger van der Zande	TBC
(France) TDS Racing	Oreca 07	11	(Switzerland) Mathias Beche	TBC
(France) TDS Racing	Oreca 07	11	(Canada) Tobias Lütke	TBC
(France) TDS Racing	Oreca 07	11	(France) Sami Meguetounif	TBC
(France) TDS Racing	Oreca 07	11	TBA	TBC
(France) TDS Racing	Oreca 07	29	(Denmark) David Heinemeier Hansson	TBC
(France) TDS Racing	Oreca 07	29	(United States) Scott Huffaker	TBC
(France) TDS Racing	Oreca 07	29	(United States) Steven Thomas	TBC
(France) TDS Racing	Oreca 07	29	TBA	TBC
(Poland) Inter Europol Competition	Oreca 07	43	(United States) Jeremy Clarke	TBC
(Poland) Inter Europol Competition	Oreca 07	43	(France) Tom Dillmann	TBC
(Poland) Inter Europol Competition	Oreca 07	43	(Portugal) António Félix da Costa	TBC
(Poland) Inter Europol Competition	Oreca 07	43	(United States) Bijoy Garg	TBC
(Poland) Inter Europol Competition	Oreca 07	343	(United States) Dan Goldburg	TBC
(Poland) Inter Europol Competition	Oreca 07	343	(United States) Nolan Siegel	TBC
(Poland) Inter Europol Competition	Oreca 07	343	(Poland) Jakub Śmiechowski	TBC
(Poland) Inter Europol Competition	Oreca 07	343	(United Kingdom) Nick Yelloly	TBC

=== GT Daytona (GTD Pro / GTD) ===
Team	Chassis	Engine	No.	Drivers	Rounds
GTD Pro
(United States) Corvette Racing by Pratt Miller Motorsports	Chevrolet Corvette Z06 GT3.R	Chevrolet LT6.R 5.5 L V8	3	(Spain) Antonio García	TBC
(United States) Corvette Racing by Pratt Miller Motorsports	Chevrolet Corvette Z06 GT3.R	Chevrolet LT6.R 5.5 L V8	3	(United Kingdom) Alexander Sims	TBC
(United States) Corvette Racing by Pratt Miller Motorsports	Chevrolet Corvette Z06 GT3.R	Chevrolet LT6.R 5.5 L V8	3	TBA	TBC
(United States) Corvette Racing by Pratt Miller Motorsports	Chevrolet Corvette Z06 GT3.R	Chevrolet LT6.R 5.5 L V8	4	(Netherlands) Nicky Catsburg	TBC
(United States) Corvette Racing by Pratt Miller Motorsports	Chevrolet Corvette Z06 GT3.R	Chevrolet LT6.R 5.5 L V8	4	(United States) Tommy Milner	TBC
(United States) Corvette Racing by Pratt Miller Motorsports	Chevrolet Corvette Z06 GT3.R	Chevrolet LT6.R 5.5 L V8	4	TBA	TBC
(United States) Ford Racing	Ford Mustang GT3 Evo	Ford Coyote 5.4 L V8	64	(United Kingdom) Ben Barker	TBC
(United States) Ford Racing	Ford Mustang GT3 Evo	Ford Coyote 5.4 L V8	64	(Norway) Dennis Olsen	TBC
(United States) Ford Racing	Ford Mustang GT3 Evo	Ford Coyote 5.4 L V8	64	TBA	TBC
(United States) Ford Racing	Ford Mustang GT3 Evo	Ford Coyote 5.4 L V8	65	(Germany) Christopher Mies	TBC
(United States) Ford Racing	Ford Mustang GT3 Evo	Ford Coyote 5.4 L V8	65	(Belgium) Frédéric Vervisch	TBC
(United States) Ford Racing	Ford Mustang GT3 Evo	Ford Coyote 5.4 L V8	65	TBA	TBC
(United States) Car Blanche	Aston Martin Vantage AMR GT3 Evo	Aston Martin AMR16A 4.0 L Turbo V8	68	(France) Valentin Hasse-Clot	TBC
(United States) Car Blanche	Aston Martin Vantage AMR GT3 Evo	Aston Martin AMR16A 4.0 L Turbo V8	68	(Denmark) Marco Sørensen	TBC
(United States) Car Blanche	Aston Martin Vantage AMR GT3 Evo	Aston Martin AMR16A 4.0 L Turbo V8	68	TBA	TBC
(Germany) GetSpeed Performance	Mercedes-AMG GT3 Evo	Mercedes-AMG M159 6.2 L V8	69	(United States) Anthony Bartone	TBC
(Germany) GetSpeed Performance	Mercedes-AMG GT3 Evo	Mercedes-AMG M159 6.2 L V8	69	(Germany) Fabian Schiller	TBC
(Germany) GetSpeed Performance	Mercedes-AMG GT3 Evo	Mercedes-AMG M159 6.2 L V8	69	TBA	TBC
(United States) Hanley Motorsports Incorporated	BMW M4 GT3 Evo	BMW P58 3.0 L Turbo I6	TBA	TBA	TBC
(United States) Hanley Motorsports Incorporated	BMW M4 GT3 Evo	BMW P58 3.0 L Turbo I6	TBA	TBA	TBC
(United States) Hanley Motorsports Incorporated	BMW M4 GT3 Evo	BMW P58 3.0 L Turbo I6	TBA	TBA	TBC
GTD
(Canada) 13 Autosport	Chevrolet Corvette Z06 GT3.R	Chevrolet LT6.R 5.5 L V8	13	(United Kingdom) Matt Bell	TBC
(Canada) 13 Autosport	Chevrolet Corvette Z06 GT3.R	Chevrolet LT6.R 5.5 L V8	13	(Canada) Orey Fidani	TBC
(Canada) 13 Autosport	Chevrolet Corvette Z06 GT3.R	Chevrolet LT6.R 5.5 L V8	13	(France) Mathieu Jaminet	TBC
(Canada) 13 Autosport	Chevrolet Corvette Z06 GT3.R	Chevrolet LT6.R 5.5 L V8	13	(Germany) Lars Kern	TBC
(United States) Myers Riley Motorsports	Ford Mustang GT3 Evo	Ford Coyote 5.4 L V8	16	(United States) Jarett Andretti	TBC
(United States) Myers Riley Motorsports	Ford Mustang GT3 Evo	Ford Coyote 5.4 L V8	16	(United States) Riley Dickinson	TBC
(United States) Myers Riley Motorsports	Ford Mustang GT3 Evo	Ford Coyote 5.4 L V8	16	(Brazil) Felipe Fraga	TBC
(United States) Kellymoss	Porsche 911 GT3 R (992.2)	Porsche M97/80 4.2 L Flat-6	17	(United States) Colin Braun	TBC
(United States) Kellymoss	Porsche 911 GT3 R (992.2)	Porsche M97/80 4.2 L Flat-6	17	(United States) Michael Clark	TBC
(United States) Kellymoss	Porsche 911 GT3 R (992.2)	Porsche M97/80 4.2 L Flat-6	17	(Canada) Kyle Marcelli	TBC
(United States) Conquest Racing	Ferrari 296 GT3 Evo	Ferrari F163CE 3.0 L Turbo V6	34	(Spain) Albert Costa	TBC
(United States) Conquest Racing	Ferrari 296 GT3 Evo	Ferrari F163CE 3.0 L Turbo V6	34	(United States) Manny Franco	TBC
(United States) Conquest Racing	Ferrari 296 GT3 Evo	Ferrari F163CE 3.0 L Turbo V6	34	(Italy) Lorenzo Patrese	TBC
(United States) Winward Racing	Mercedes-AMG GT3 Evo	Mercedes-AMG M159 6.2 L V8	57	(Switzerland) Philip Ellis	TBC
(United States) Winward Racing	Mercedes-AMG GT3 Evo	Mercedes-AMG M159 6.2 L V8	57	(United States) Russell Ward	TBC
(United States) Winward Racing	Mercedes-AMG GT3 Evo	Mercedes-AMG M159 6.2 L V8	57	TBA	TBC
(United Kingdom) Inception Racing	Chevrolet Corvette Z06 GT3.R	Chevrolet LT6.R 5.5 L V8	70	(United States) Brendan Iribe	TBC
(United Kingdom) Inception Racing	Chevrolet Corvette Z06 GT3.R	Chevrolet LT6.R 5.5 L V8	70	(United Kingdom) Ollie Millroy	TBC
(United Kingdom) Inception Racing	Chevrolet Corvette Z06 GT3.R	Chevrolet LT6.R 5.5 L V8	70	(Denmark) Frederik Schandorff	TBC
(United States) Wright Motorsports	Porsche 911 GT3 R (992.2)	Porsche M97/80 4.2 L Flat-6	72	(United States) Dave Musial Jr.	TBC
(United States) Wright Motorsports	Porsche 911 GT3 R (992.2)	Porsche M97/80 4.2 L Flat-6	72	(New Zealand) Ryan Yardley	TBC
(United States) Wright Motorsports	Porsche 911 GT3 R (992.2)	Porsche M97/80 4.2 L Flat-6	72	TBA	TBC
(United States) Wright Motorsports	Porsche 911 GT3 R (992.2)	Porsche M97/80 4.2 L Flat-6	120	(United States) Adam Adelson	TBC
(United States) Wright Motorsports	Porsche 911 GT3 R (992.2)	Porsche M97/80 4.2 L Flat-6	120	(Australia) Tom Sargent	TBC
(United States) Wright Motorsports	Porsche 911 GT3 R (992.2)	Porsche M97/80 4.2 L Flat-6	120	TBA	TBC
(United States) Lone Star Racing	Mercedes-AMG GT3 Evo	Mercedes-AMG M159 6.2 L V8	80	(Netherlands) Lin Hodenius	TBC
(United States) Lone Star Racing	Mercedes-AMG GT3 Evo	Mercedes-AMG M159 6.2 L V8	80	(Republic of Ireland) James Roe	TBC
(United States) Lone Star Racing	Mercedes-AMG GT3 Evo	Mercedes-AMG M159 6.2 L V8	80	TBA	TBC
(United States) Turner Motorsport	BMW M4 GT3 Evo	BMW P58 3.0 L Turbo I6	96	(United States) Robby Foley	TBC
(United States) Turner Motorsport	BMW M4 GT3 Evo	BMW P58 3.0 L Turbo I6	96	(United States) Jake Walker	TBC
(United States) Turner Motorsport	BMW M4 GT3 Evo	BMW P58 3.0 L Turbo I6	96	TBA	TBC
(United States) Hanley Motorsports Incorporated	BMW M4 GT3 Evo	BMW P58 3.0 L Turbo I6	TBA	TBA	TBC
(United States) Hanley Motorsports Incorporated	BMW M4 GT3 Evo	BMW P58 3.0 L Turbo I6	TBA	TBA	TBC
(United States) Hanley Motorsports Incorporated	BMW M4 GT3 Evo	BMW P58 3.0 L Turbo I6	TBA	TBA	TBC

== See also ==
- 2027 FIA World Endurance Championship
- 2027 European Le Mans Series
- 2026–27 Asian Le Mans Series
