= Trenton Estep =

American racing driver

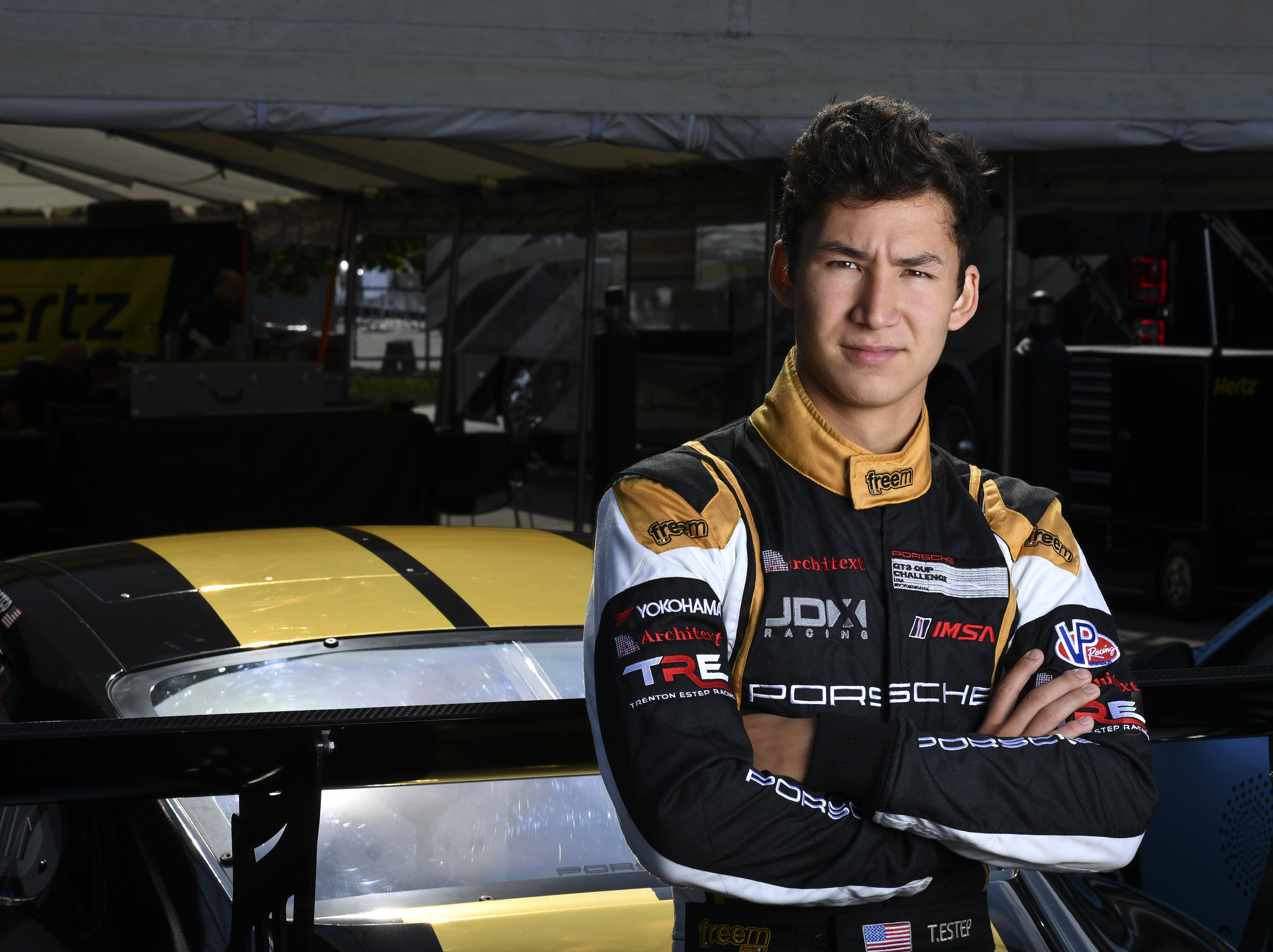
- Trenton Estep JDX Racing Porsche GT3 Cup
- Nationality: (United States) American
- Born: 24 November 1999 (age 26) San Antonio, United States

IMSA Porsche GT3 Cup Challenge career
- Debut season: 2017
- Current team: MDK Motorsports
- Categorisation: FIA Silver
- Car number: 53 - MDK Motorsports
- Former teams: JDX Racing, Exclusive Autosport, Dallas Karting Complex, Koene USA, Piquet Sports, Texas Karts
- Starts: 31
- Wins: 6
- Podiums: 25
- Poles: 2

Awards
- 2022, 2018, 2017, 2016, 2015, 2014: 2023 Porsche Selected Driver, 2018 IMSA Porsche GT3 Cup Challenge Champion, 2017 3rd in IMSA Porsche GT3 Cup Challenge, 2016 Formula Tour F1600 Champion, 2016 Canadian F1600 Super Series Champion, 2015 US Open Rotax Junior Champion, 2014 SKUSA Pro Tour S5 Shifter Champion

Trenton Estep (born November 24, 1999) is an American professional racing driver. Estep grew up racing karts from the age of four in New Braunfels, Texas. He competed in various karting competitions such as SKUSA Pro Tour, Florida Winter Tour, US Open and Rotax Grand Finals in Portugal. In 2016, he made the transition from karts to open wheel cars. He entered the Formula Tour F1600, Toyo Tires F1600 Championship Series and Canadian F1600 Super Series winning two championships. He also ran in the opening round of the Redbull Global Rallycross Championship in Phoenix Arizona. In 2017, Estep made his transition from open wheel to cars in the North American Porsche GT3 Cup Series, with JDX Racing. Estep finished on podium 11 of 16 races with multiple wins, placing third in the Porsche GT3 Cup Championship. In 2018, he returned to the Porsche GT3 Cup series with JDX Racing with renewed sponsorship by Hertz Global along with a new sponsor Byers Porsche of Columbus Ohio. Estep went on to finish on the podium in 14 of 16 races winning the 2018 IMSA Porsche GT3 Cup Challenge Championship. A final honor to end his season was being chosen by Porsche Motorsports to attend the Porsche Junior Programme Shootout in Le Castellet at Circuit Paul Ricard. Estep was only one of 11 and the youngest at age 18 of the top Porsche drivers from all over the world under the age of 25 to receive the exclusive invite.

Starting in 2019, Estep is a professional driver coach and driver for MDK Motorsports based in Pataskala, Ohio.

== Racing career ==
Estep was born in San Antonio, Texas and started racing go-karts at the age of four at his local track called Hill Country Kart Club (HCKC) located in New Braunfels, Texas. He was mentored and supported by Tommy Muth of Texas Karts. Estep went on to win numerous club and Texas road racing championships before he started karting at a national level in 2011. In 2011, Estep finished sixth in the SKUSA Pro Tour TaG Cadet series. The championship was won by Colton Herta and was competed by other young talents such as Patricio O'Ward and Sophia Flörsch. In 2014, Estep joined Dallas Karting Complex (DKC) to win the SKUSA Pro Tour S5 Shifter class aboard his Sodi Kart chassis after sweeping both the SKUSA SpringNats and SummerNats and then wrapping up the SKUSA Pro-Tour title in Las Vegas at the SuperNats. The following year, Estep raced in various Rotax Max Junior series with Koene USA, winning the inaugural Maxspeed US Open Rotax Junior Championship aboard his Tony Kart chassis by sweeping Round 1 in Dallas, Round 2 in Grand Junction Colorado and securing the Title in Las Vegas.

In 2016, Estep made the transition to racing open wheel cars. The main focus was the Quebec-based Formula Tour 1600 and Super Series Championships. He competed in a Honda powered Spectrum 015H entered by Exclusive Autosport. Estep clinched both Championships winning twelve out of seventeen races. He also set four track records. He shattered the F1 Canadian Grand Prix F1600 track record by 1.4 seconds. He also holds the track record at North America's oldest street race Trois Rivieres or GP3R as well as track records at Mont Tremblant and Calabogie. Because of his championship in the Formula Tour F1600 series Estep qualified to compete at the 2016 Mazda Road to Indy Shootout. Alongside the Formula Tour F1600, Estep competed in only a select few races in the Ontario-based Toyo Tires F1600 Championship Series, where he finished third in the championship. Estep also competed in the US in only two race weekends F1600 Championship Series events at Road Atlanta and Virginia International Raceway. Estep won the second race of the weekend at Virginia International Raceway.

Estep made a one-off appearance in RedbullGlobal RallyCross with PMG Rallysport replacing Parker Chase at the Wild Horse Pass Motorsports Park in Chandler, Arizona. Estep received the last minute opportunity just days before the event only having four laps in a business parking lot to fit seat and test radio before leaving for Arizona. He had just received his drivers license. He had to teach himself how to drive in the dirt, E-Brake and jump a rally car off a dirt ramp 50' as he raced the car. He went on to lead the Final live on NBC Sports when his front suspension broke taking him out of the lead and the race.

In 2016, Estep also made the leap from Junior to Senior class in karting. He won in only his second start in the Florida Winter Tour in Round Two at Ocala Grand Prix. He competed against an international field including European World Champion Jordan Lennox-Lamb and Canadian Indy Car driver Zachary Claman DeMelo.

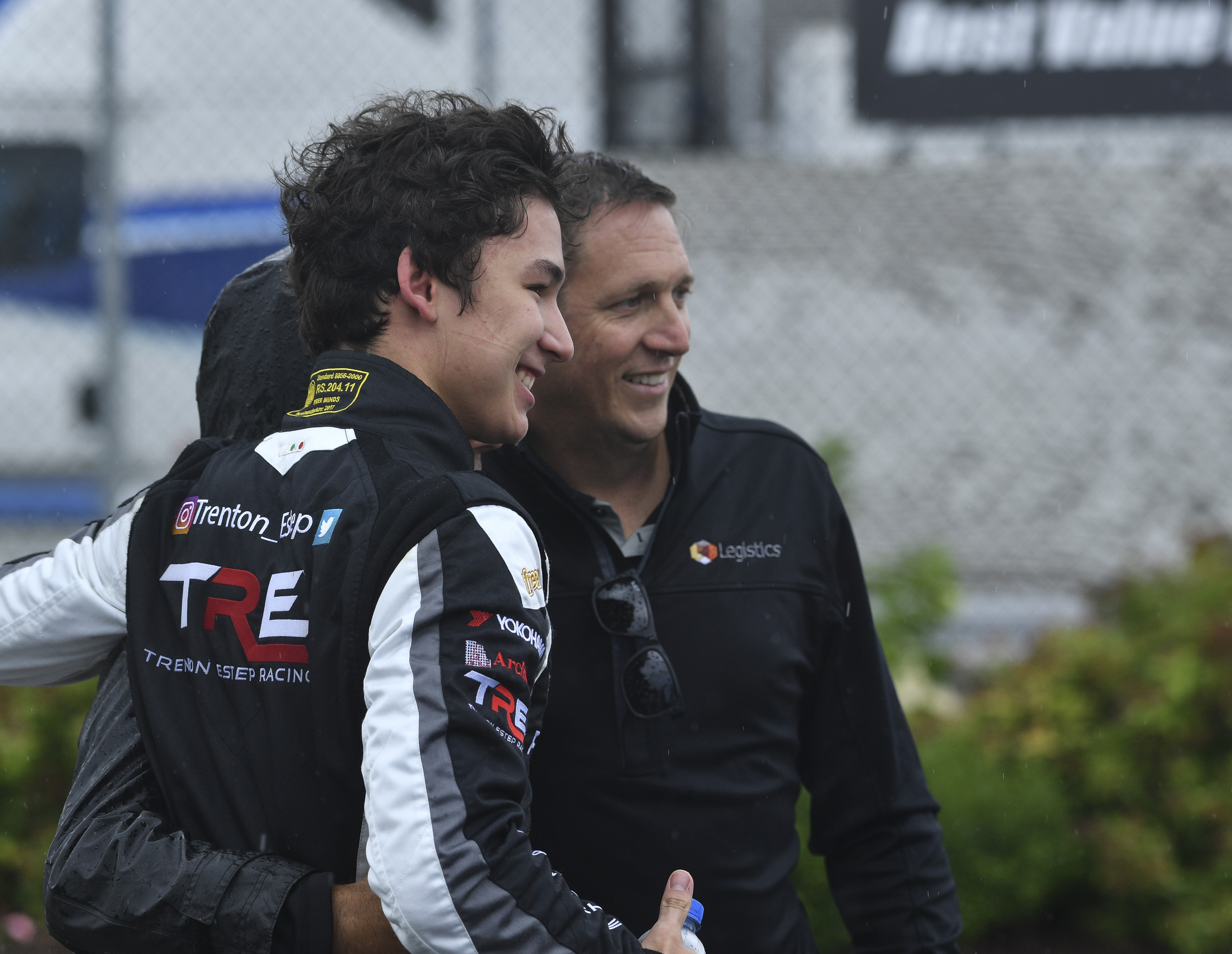
Estep (left) with Spencer Pumpelly at Virginia International Raceway in 2017

After receiving 22 offers at the end of 2016 to compete in various series including Porsche GT3 Cup, Lamborghini Super Trofeo, USF2000, Pro Mazda, US F4, Formula Atlantics, Pirelli World Challenge, IMSA Lites, and F2000, Estep signed a contract with JDX Racing to run in the IMSA Porsche GT3 Cup Challenge Series in 2017. He finished on podium 11 of 16 races with multiple wins, placing third in the Porsche Championship.

In 2018, Estep returned to the IMSA Porsche GT3 Cup Challenge series with JDX Racing. Hertz Global also continued their sponsorship along with a new sponsor Byers Porsche of Columbus Ohio. Estep ended the 2018 Porsche GT3 Cup Challenge winning the Championship over close friend and competitor Roman DeAngelis

In 2020, Estep participated in limited racing due to the COVID-19 pandemic. He made a return to the Rolex 24 Hours at Daytona in his first drive in GTD driving for Black Swan Racing. The team finished fifth.

In 2021, Estep ran at the 12 Hours of Sebring in GTD with Team Hardpoint EBM Racing pairing with Rob Ferriol and Earl Bamber. He also ran a partial season in TCR with CB Motorsports.

At the start of 2022, Estep won the Pro-Am class co-driving with Mark Kvamme at the Gulf 12 Hours at Yas Marina Circuit in Abu Dhabi in an AF Corse Ferrari. It also was a return to a full season in Porsche Carrera Cup North America driving for MDK Motorsports. He ended the season in fourth place. At the end of the 2022 Porsche Carrera Cup season, he was chosen by Porsche Motorsport North America as a "Porsche Selected Driver" for the 2023 season.

In 2023, Estep would run a limited schedule in IMSA in GTD Pro for MDK Motorsports, and a full season in SRO Fanatec World GT Challenge with his co-driver Seth Lucas. The year started out at the Rolex 24 Hour at Daytona, where he placed fourth in GTD Pro driving with Mark Kvamme, Jan Magnussen and Jason Hart.

== Racing record ==
=== 2018 IMSA Porsche GT3 Cup Challenge Results ===
==== 2018 Porsche GT3 Cup Challenge Champion ====
Year	Team	1	2	3	4	5	6	7	8	9	10	11	12	13	14	15	16	Rank	Points
2018	JDX Racing	SB **1**	SB **2**	BM **3**	BM **5**	MO **1**	MO **2**	WG **2**	WG **1**	RA **3**	RA **3**	VIR **3**	VIR **2**	SR **3**	SR **1**	ATL **5**	ATL **3**	1st	499

=== 2017 IMSA Porsche GT3 Cup Challenge Results ===
==== Porsche GT3 Cup Challenge ====
Year	Team	1	2	3	4	5	6	7	8	9	10	11	12	13	14	15	16	Rank	Points
2017	JDX Racing	SB **3**	SB **2**	BM **3**	BM **2**	COTA **1**	COTA **2**	WG **2**	WG **DNS**	RA **6**	RA **4**	VIR **3**	VIR **DNF**	SR **6**	SR **3**	ATL **3**	ATL **1**	3rd	232

=== American/Canadian Open-Wheel Racing Results ===
==== F1600 ====
Year	Team	1	2	3	4	5	6	7	8	9	10	11	12	13	14	15	16	17	Rank	Points
2016	Exclusive Autosport	MTB **1**	MTB **1**	MTB **1**	MT **1**	MT **1**	SHV **9**	SHV **1**	SHV; DNF	TR 9	TR **1**	TR **1**	CB 1	CB 1	CB; DNF	MTB **1**	MTB **1**	MTB **1**	1st	384

==== F1600 ====
Year	Team	1	2	3	4	5	6	7	8	9	10	11	Rank	Points
2016	Exclusive Autosport	F1 **1**	F1 **1**	CMP **2**	CMP **2**	CMP **2**	TR 5	TR **1**	TR **12**	CB 1	CB 1	CB; DNF	1st	237

=== 2016 Global RallyCross Championship Results ===
==== GRC Lites ====
Year	Entrant	Car	1	2	3	4	5	6	7	8	9	10	11	12	Position	Points
2016	PMG Rallysport	Lites Ford Fiesta	PHO1; 5	PHO2; 7	DAL †	DAY1 †	DAY2 †	MCAS1 †	MCAS2 †	DC †	AC †	SEA †	LA1 †	LA2 †	15th	57

† DNA - Did Not Attend.

==== Rotax Junior ====
Year	Team	1	2	3	Rank
2015	KoeneUSA	DAL; 1	GDJ; 1	LVN; 5	1st

==== Shifter - S5 Stock Moto ====
Year	Team	1	2	3	Rank
2014	Dallas Karting Complex - DKC	DAL; 1	MOD; 1	LVN; 5	1st

=== Complete WeatherTech SportsCar Championship results ===
(key) (Races in bold indicate pole position; results in italics indicate fastest lap)

Year	Team	Class	Make	Engine	1	2	3	4	5	6	7	8	9	10	11	Pos.	Points
2020	Black Swan Racing	GTD	Porsche 911 GT3 R	Porsche 4.0L Flat-6	DAY; 5	DAY	SEB	ELK	VIR	ATL	MDO	CLT	PET	LGA	SEB	43rd	26
2021	Forty7 Motorsports	LMP3	Duqueine M30 - D08	Nissan VK56DE 5.6 L V8	DAY; 7†	SEB	MDO	WGL	WGL	ELK	PET					NC†	0†
2022	Forty7 Motorsports	LMP3	Duqueine M30 - D08	Nissan VK56DE 5.6 L V8	DAY; 8†	SEB	MDO	WGL	MOS	ELK	PET					NC†	0†
2023	MDK Motorsports	GTD Pro	Porsche 911 GT3 R (992)	Porsche 4.2 L Flat-6	DAY; 6		LBH	MON		MOS	LIM	ELK	VIR	IMS	PET	26th	250
2023	Ave Motorsports	LMP3	Ligier JS P320	Nissan VK56DE 5.6 L V8		SEB; 5			WGL; 6							20th	532
2026	Car Blanche	GTD	Aston Martin Vantage AMR GT3 Evo	Aston Martin M177 4.0 L Turbo V8	DAY	SEB	LBH	LGA	WGL; 3	MOS	ELK; 3	VIR	IMS	PET		49th	630

^{†} Points only counted towards the Michelin Endurance Cup, and not the overall LMP3 Championship.
