= Racing Spirit of Léman =

French-Swiss sports car racing team

(France) (Switzerland) Racing Spirit of Léman
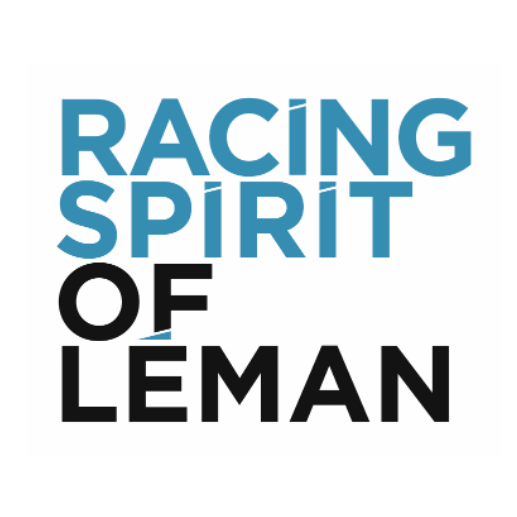
- Founded: 2019
- Founder(s): Patrick Barbier; Herminie Barbier
- Base: La Roche-sur-Foron, Haute-Savoie, France
- Current series: FIA World Endurance Championship; European Le Mans Series; Le Mans Cup; Ultimate Cup Series; GT4 European Series
- Former series: FFSA GT Championship; Prototype Winter Series
- Current drivers: FIA World Endurance Championship; 10. (Brazil) Eduardo Barrichello (United States) Derek DeBoer (France) Valentin Hasse-Clot; European Le Mans Series: 31. (France) Marius Fossard (France) Jean-Ludovic Foubert (France) Jacques Wolff; 59. (France) Erwan Bastard (France) Valentin Hasse-Clot (France) Clément Mateu; Le Mans Cup: 10. (Germany) Sebastian Schmitt (Germany) Dominik Schraml
- Teams' Championships: 2022 LMC LMP3, 2023 LMC GT3, 2024 French GT4 Silver
- Drivers' Championships: 2022 LMC LMP3, 2023 LMC GT3, 2024 French GT4 Silver

Racing Spirit of Léman is a French-Swiss sports car racing team that currently competes in the LMP3 and LMGT3 class of the European Le Mans Series. The team was founded in 2019 by Patrick Barbier.

Notable accolades include the 2022 and 2023 Le Mans Cup drivers' and teams' championships in the LMP3 and GT3 categories respectively.

Contrary to popular belief the teams' name has no relation to the headline WEC event of Le Mans, but comes from the French name for Lake Geneva, 'Lac Léman', which the team is based near in La Roche-sur-Foron, France.

== History ==
Originally, Racing Spirit of Léman ran the operations for Cool Racing (now CLX Motorsport). In late 2020, after Nicolas Lapierre became a majority shareholder in Cool Racing, he decided to split from Racing Spirit of Léman and take the operation of the team in house. The team formed an alliance with Aston Martin and entered into the 2022 GT4 European Series with two Aston Martin Vantage GT4s.

=== FIA World Endurance Championship ===
==== 2019–20 ====
The 2019–20 FIA World Endurance Championship season started strong with a win for the #42 Cool Racing entry at the 2019 4 Hours of Silverstone. They would win as a pair, Antonin Borga and Nicolas Lapierre, due to an injury Alexandre Coigny sustained during the European Le Mans Series race the day prior. Four further point finishes and a second podium at the 6 Hours Spa-Francorchamps saw the Racing Spirit of Léman run, Cool Racing entry finish sixth in the LMP2 class.

==== 2025 ====
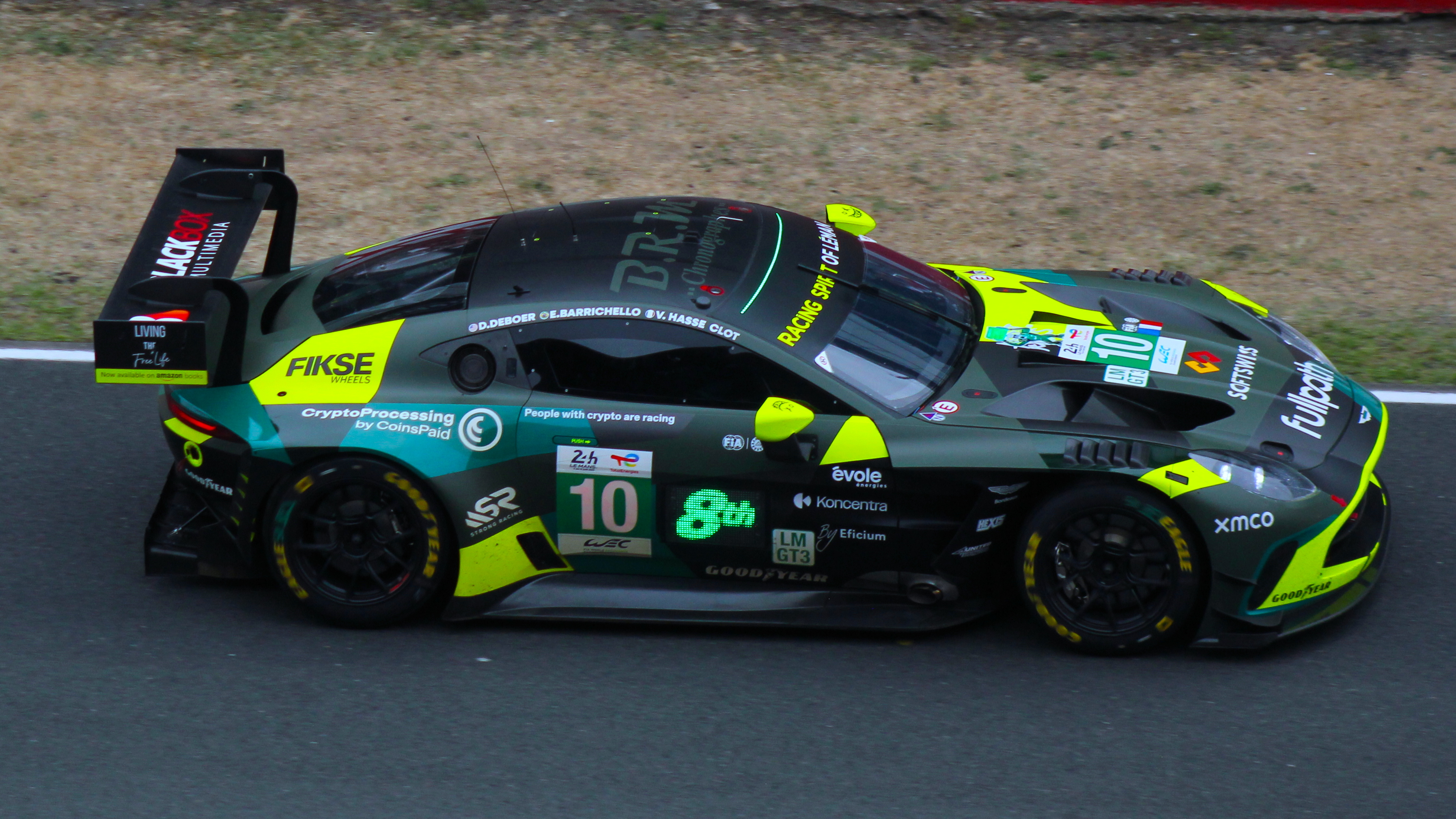
#10 Racing Spirit of Léman Aston Martin Vantage AMR GT3 Evo at the 2025 24 Hours of Le Mans

On November 22, 2024, the team announced they would be entering the 2025 FIA World Endurance Championship as one of the two Aston Martin LMGT3 teams. Drivers for the season were French Aston Martin factory driver, Valentin Hasse-Clot, American Derek DeBoer and Brazilian Eduardo Barrichello, son of former Formula One driver Rubens Barrichello.

=== European Le Mans Series ===
==== 2023 ====
In 2023, following the LMP3 double championship in the Le Mans Cup, the team entered into the LMP3 class with a Ligier JS P320. Drivers for the season were Antoine Doquin, Jacques Wolff, Fabien Michal and Jean-Ludovic Foubert. The team would finish on the podium on their debut in the series at the 4 Hours of Barcelona. They then followed that up with a win at the 4 Hours of Le Castellet. At the end of the season, the team would finish fifth in the LMP3 class.

==== 2024 ====
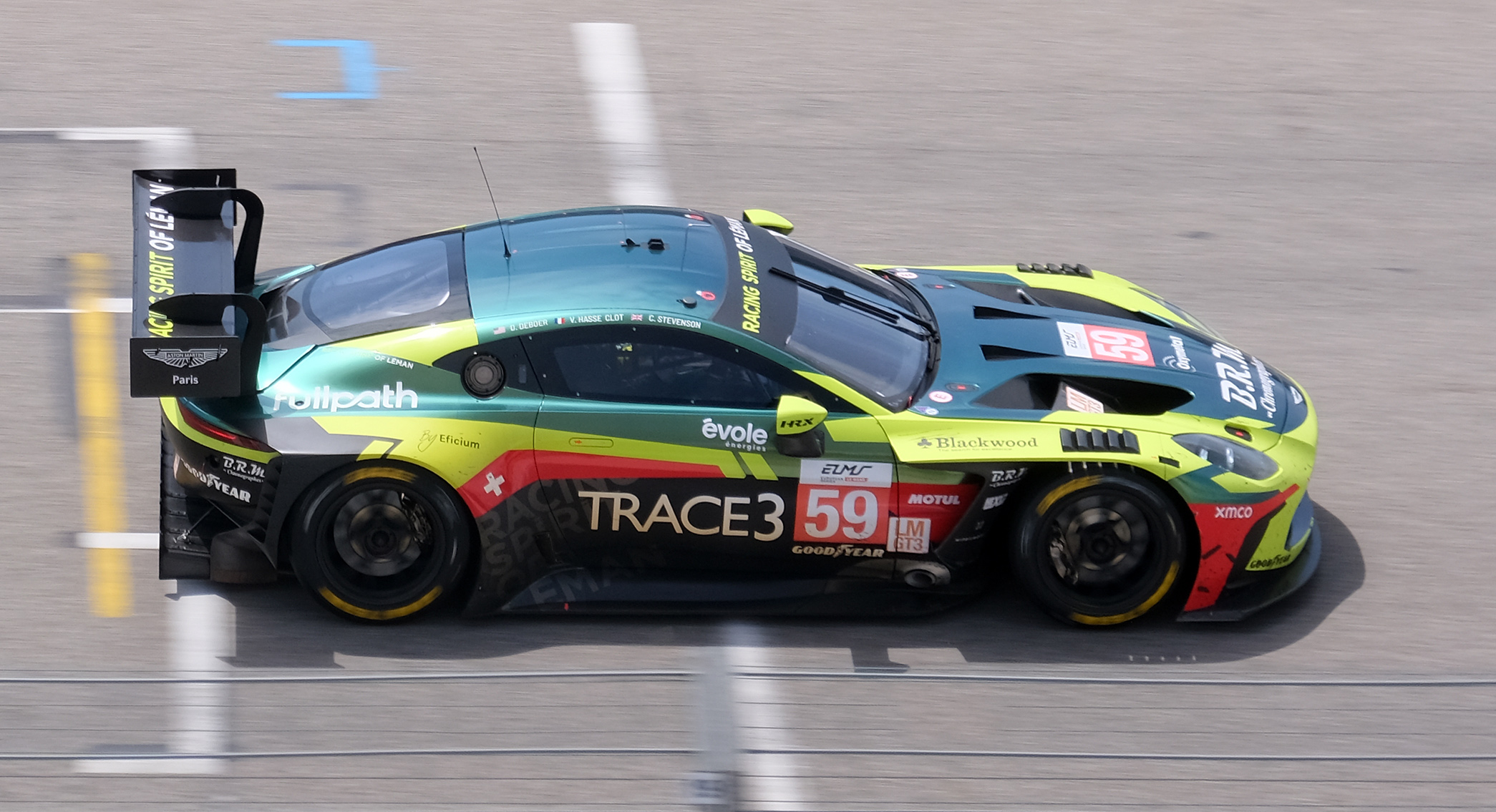
#59 Racing Spirit of Léman Aston Martin Vantage AMR GT3 Evo at the 2024 4 Hours of Le Castellet

Racing Spirit of Léman expanded to the LMGT3 class with an Aston Martin Vantage AMR GT3 Evo with drivers Derek DeBoer, Valentin Hasse-Clot and Casper Stevenson, while continuing to operate a Ligier JS P320 in the LMP3 class. The team secured their first LMGT3 class podium at Le Castellet, en route to a third place finish in the championship, while the LMP3 entry finished in 7th.

==== 2025 ====
In 2025, the team again entered one car in LMP3 and LMGT3, with Marius Fossard, Jean-Ludovic Foubert and Jacques Wolff in a new Ligier JS P325 in LMP3 and Erwan Bastard, Valentin Hasse-Clot and Clément Mateu in an Aston Martin Vantage AMR GT3 Evo. Both entries finished on the podium once throughout the season, the No. 31 LMP3 finished 2nd at Imola while the No. 59 LMGT3 won at Spa-Francorchamps.

== Racing record ==
=== FIA World Endurance Championship ===
(key) (Races in bold indicate pole position; races in italics indicate fastest lap)

Year	Entrant	Class	No.	Chassis	Engine	Drivers	1	2	3	4	5	6	7	8	Pos.	Points
2019–20	(Switzerland) Cool Racing	LMP2	42	Oreca 07	Gibson GK428 4.2 L V8	(Switzerland) Antonin Borga (France) Nicolas Lapierre (Switzerland) Alexandre Coigny	SIL; 1	FUJ; 5	**SHA**; **Ret**	BHR; 6	**COA**; **4**	SPA; 2	LMS; 4	BHR	6th	103
2025	(France) Racing Spirit of Léman	LMGT3	10	Aston Martin Vantage AMR GT3 Evo	Aston Martin M177 4.0 L Turbo V8	(Brazil) Eduardo Barrichello (United States) Derek DeBoer (France) Valentin Hasse-Clot (rounds 1–4, 6) (United States) Anthony McIntosh (rounds 5, 7–8)	QAT; 9	IMO; 11	SPA; 6	LMS; 9	**SÃO**; **3**	COA; 11	**FUJ**; **17**	BHR; 14	15th	32

^{*} Season still in progress.

=== 24 Hours of Le Mans results ===
Year	Entrant	No.	Car	Drivers	Class	Laps	Pos.	Class Pos.
2020	(Switzerland) Cool Racing	42	Oreca 07-Gibson	(Switzerland) Antonin Borga (Switzerland) Alexandre Coigny (France) Nicolas Lapierre	LMP2	365	12th	8th
2025	(France) Racing Spirit of Léman	10	Aston Martin Vantage AMR GT3 Evo	(Brazil) Eduardo Barrichello (United States) Derek DeBoer (France) Valentin Hasse-Clot	LMGT3	336	45th	13th
2026	(France) Racing Spirit of Léman	59	Aston Martin Vantage AMR GT3 Evo	(France) Marius Fossard (France) Valentin Hasse-Clot (France) Clément Mateu	LMGT3	332	43rd	11th

=== European Le Mans Series ===
(key) (Races in bold indicate pole position; races in italics indicate fastest lap)

Year	Entrant	Class	No.	Chassis	Engine	Drivers	1	2	3	4	5	6	Pos.	Points
2023	(Switzerland) Racing Spirit of Léman	LMP3	31	Ligier JS P320	Nissan VK56DE 5.6 L V8	(France) Antoine Doquin (France) Jacques Wolff (France) Fabien Michal (round 1) (France) Jean-Ludovic Foubert (rounds 2–6)	CAT; 3	LEC; 1	ARA; Ret	SPA; 8	POR; 8	ALG; 7	5th	54
2024	(Switzerland) Racing Spirit of Léman	LMP3	31	Ligier JS P320	Nissan VK56DE 5.6 L V8	(France) Antoine Doquin (France) Jean-Ludovic Foubert (France) Jacques Wolff	CAT; 7	LEC; 6	IMO; Ret	SPA; 2	MUG; 4	POR; Ret	7th	44
2024	(Switzerland) Racing Spirit of Léman	LMGT3	59	Aston Martin Vantage AMR GT3 Evo	Aston Martin M177 4.0 L Turbo V8	(United States) Derek DeBoer (France) Valentin Hasse-Clot (United Kingdom) Casper Stevenson	CAT; 6	LEC; 3	IMO; 2	SPA; 4	**MUG**; **5**	POR; 9	3rd	66
2025	(France) Racing Spirit of Léman	LMP3	31	Ligier JS P325	Toyota V35A-FTS 3.5 L Turbo V6	(France) Marius Fossard (France) Jean-Ludovic Foubert (France) Jacques Wolff	CAT; 7	LEC; 7	IMO; 2	SPA; 9	SIL; 8	POR; 10	9th	37
2025	(France) Racing Spirit of Léman	LMGT3	59	Aston Martin Vantage AMR GT3 Evo	Aston Martin M177 4.0 L Turbo V8	(France) Erwan Bastard (France) Valentin Hasse-Clot (France) Clément Mateu	CAT; 7	**LEC**; **6**	IMO; 7	SPA; 1	SIL; 6	POR; 5	3rd	64
