= 2025 Le Mans Cup =

European racing season

The 2025 Le Mans Cup, known as the 2025 Michelin Le Mans Cup for sponsorship reasons, was the tenth season of the Le Mans Cup. The six-event series began at Circuit de Barcelona-Catalunya on 5 April and concluded at Algarve International Circuit on 18 October. The series was open to Le Mans Prototypes in the LMP3 class, now split into two, and grand tourer sports cars in the GT3 class. The season marked the debut of the new, third-generation LMP3 cars.

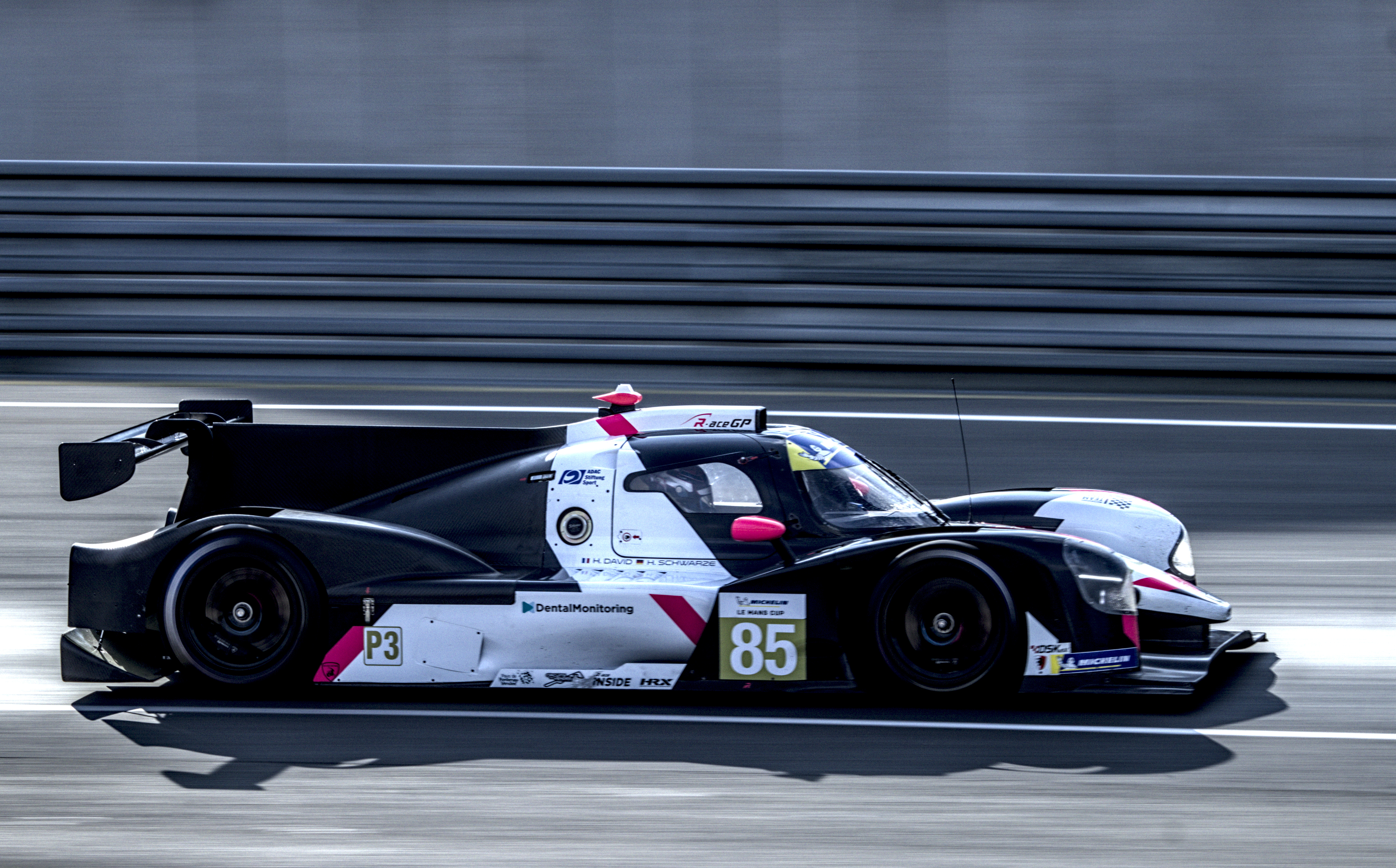
The No. 85 R-ace GP won the LMP3 Teams' and Drivers' championships

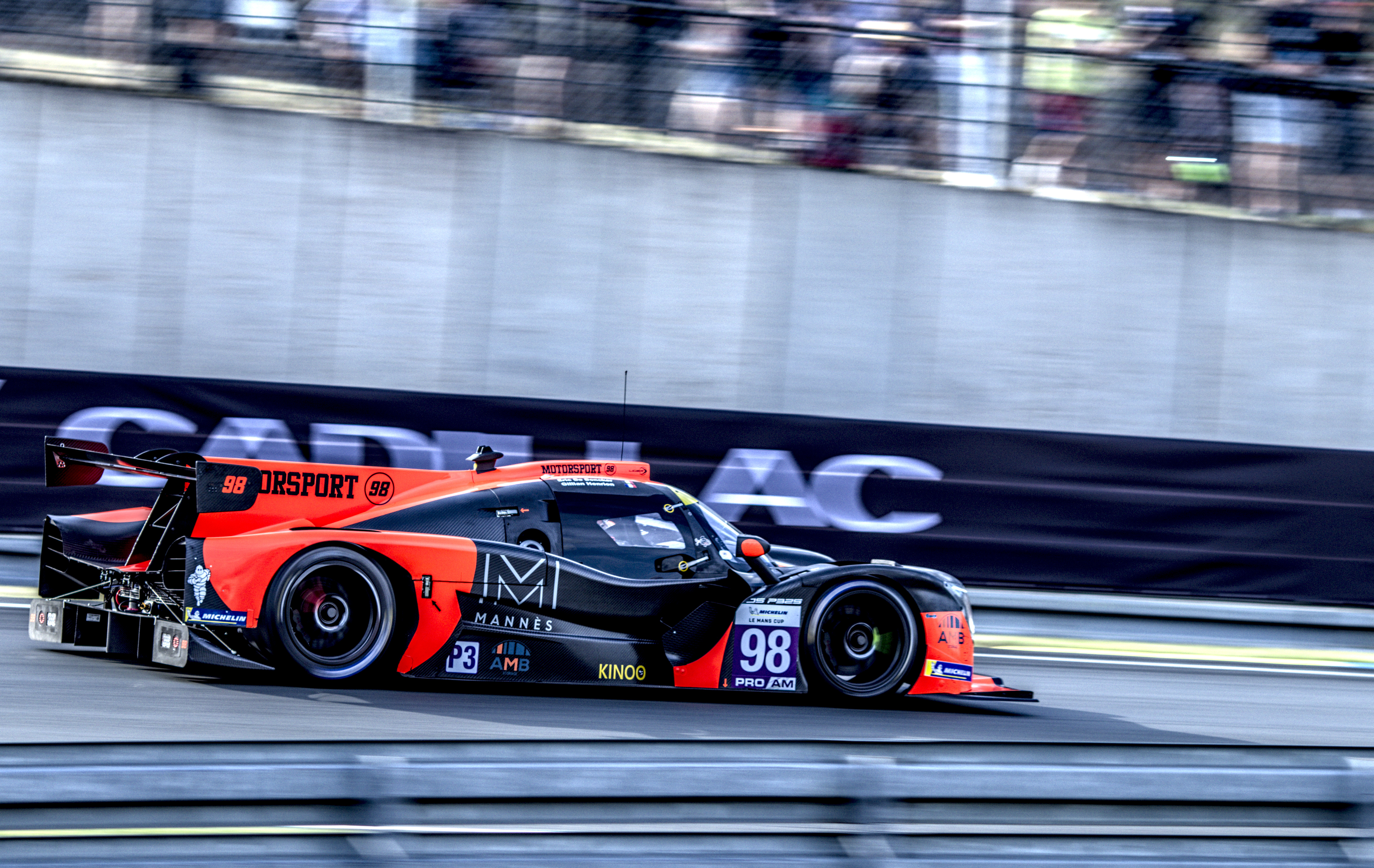
The No. 98 Motorsport98 won the LMP3 Pro-Am Teams' and Drivers' championships

== Calendar ==
The provisional calendar for the 2025 season was announced on 2 October 2024. Silverstone Circuit was added to the calendar for the first time, replacing the round at Mugello. Starting this season, the race duration was extended from 1 hour and 50 minutes to 2 hours, except for the Silverstone round, which kept its original length. The Road to Le Mans races ran for 1 hour instead of 55 minutes.

Rnd	Circuit	Location	Race Length	Date
1	(Spain) Circuit de Barcelona-Catalunya	Montmeló, Spain	2 hours	5 April
2	(France) Circuit Paul Ricard	Le Castellet, France	2 hours	3 May
3	(France) Circuit de la Sarthe	Le Mans, France	1 hour	13 June
3	(France) Circuit de la Sarthe	Le Mans, France	1 hour	14 June
4	(Belgium) Circuit de Spa-Francorchamps	Stavelot, Belgium	2 hours	23 August
5	(United Kingdom) Silverstone Circuit	Silverstone, United Kingdom	1 hour, 50 minutes	13 September
6	(Portugal) Algarve International Circuit	Portimão, Portugal	2 hours	18 October

== Entries ==
=== LMP3 ===
All cars in the LMP3 class use the Toyota V35A-FTS 3.5 L twin-turbo V6 engine and Michelin tyres. Entries in the LMP3 Pro-Am class, set aside for teams with a Bronze-rated driver in their line-up, are denoted with icons.

Entrant/Team	Chassis	No.	MISC	Drivers	Rounds
(Luxembourg) DKR Engineering	Ginetta G61-LT-P3 Evo	2	PA	(France) Thomas Laurent	3
(Luxembourg) DKR Engineering	Ginetta G61-LT-P3 Evo	2	PA	(Estonia) Antti Rammo	3
(Luxembourg) DKR Engineering	Ginetta G61-LT-P3 Evo	3	P3	(United States) Wyatt Brichacek	All
(Luxembourg) DKR Engineering	Ginetta G61-LT-P3 Evo	3	P3	(United Kingdom) Freddie Tomlinson	All
(United Kingdom) Nielsen Racing	ADESS AD25	4	P3	(Colombia) Henry Cubides Olarte	All
(United Kingdom) Nielsen Racing	ADESS AD25	4	P3	(Spain) Mikkel Kristensen	All
(United Kingdom) Nielsen Racing	ADESS AD25	7	P3	(United Kingdom) Tom Fleming	All
(United Kingdom) Nielsen Racing	ADESS AD25	7	P3	(United Kingdom) Colin Noble	All
(Poland) Inter Europol Competition	Ligier JS P325	5	P3	(United States) Brady Golan	5
(Poland) Inter Europol Competition	Ligier JS P325	5	P3	(United States) Nolan Siegel	5
(Poland) Inter Europol Competition	Ligier JS P325	34	PA	(United States) Ari Balogh	1–2
(Poland) Inter Europol Competition	Ligier JS P325	34	PA	(Canada) Garett Grist	1–2
(Poland) Inter Europol Competition	Ligier JS P325	34	PA	(Sweden) William Karlsson	3
(Poland) Inter Europol Competition	Ligier JS P325	34	PA	(United Kingdom) Chris Short	3
(Poland) Inter Europol Competition	Ligier JS P325	34	PA	(United Kingdom) Tim Creswick	4
(Poland) Inter Europol Competition	Ligier JS P325	34	PA	(United States) Bijoy Garg	4
(Poland) Inter Europol Competition	Ligier JS P325	34	PA	(Portugal) José Cautela	6
(Poland) Inter Europol Competition	Ligier JS P325	34	PA	(United States) Shawn Rashid	6
(Poland) Inter Europol Competition	Ligier JS P325	43	PA	(Hong Kong) David Pun	3
(Poland) Inter Europol Competition	Ligier JS P325	43	PA	(Brazil) Sérgio Sette Câmara	3
(France) ANS Motorsport	Ligier JS P325	6	P3	(Switzerland) Axel Gnos	All
(France) ANS Motorsport	Ligier JS P325	6	P3	(Germany) Markus Pommer	All
(France) ANS Motorsport	Ligier JS P325	84	PA	(France) Julien Lemoine	All
(France) ANS Motorsport	Ligier JS P325	84	PA	(France) Paul Trojani	All
(Poland) Team Virage	Ligier JS P325	8	P3	(Denmark) Sebastian Gravlund	3
(Poland) Team Virage	Ligier JS P325	8	P3	(Netherlands) Rik Koen	3
(Poland) Team Virage	Ligier JS P325	16	P3	(United Kingdom) Theo Micouris	All
(Poland) Team Virage	Ligier JS P325	16	P3	(France) Sacha Lehmann	1–3
(Poland) Team Virage	Ligier JS P325	16	P3	(Denmark) Sebastian Gravlund	4–6
(Poland) Team Virage	Ligier JS P325	44	PA	(Poland) Jacek Zielonka	4–6
(Poland) Team Virage	Ligier JS P325	44	PA	(Switzerland) Grégory de Sybourg	4–5
(Poland) Team Virage	Ligier JS P325	44	PA	(Algeria) Leo Robinson	6
(Poland) Team Virage	Ligier JS P325	74	P3	(Switzerland) Samir Ben	All
(Poland) Team Virage	Ligier JS P325	74	P3	(South Africa) Mikaeel Pitamber	All
(France) Racing Spirit of Léman	Ligier JS P325	10	PA	(Germany) Sebastian Schmitt	1, 3
(France) Racing Spirit of Léman	Ligier JS P325	10	PA	(Germany) Dominik Schraml	1, 3
(France) Racing Spirit of Léman	Ligier JS P325	10	PA	(France) Antoine Doquin	2
(France) Racing Spirit of Léman	Ligier JS P325	10	PA	(France) Jean-Ludovic Foubert	2
(France) Racing Spirit of Léman	Ligier JS P325	10	PA	(Germany) Christian Gisy	4–6
(France) Racing Spirit of Léman	Ligier JS P325	10	PA	(Germany) Ralf Kelleners	4–6
(Germany) / WTM by Rinaldi Racing (Note: Car No. 12 entered as WTM by Rinaldi Racing. Cars No. 66 and No. 71 entered as Rinaldi Racing.); (Germany) / Rinaldi Racing	Duqueine D09	12	P3	(Australia) Griffin Peebles	3
(Germany) / WTM by Rinaldi Racing; (Germany) / Rinaldi Racing	Duqueine D09	12	P3	(Italy) Valerio Rinicella	3
(Germany) / WTM by Rinaldi Racing; (Germany) / Rinaldi Racing	Ligier JS P325	66	PA	(Germany) Steve Parrow	All
(Germany) / WTM by Rinaldi Racing; (Germany) / Rinaldi Racing	Ligier JS P325	66	PA	(Australia) Griffin Peebles	1–2, 4–6
(Germany) / WTM by Rinaldi Racing; (Germany) / Rinaldi Racing	Ligier JS P325	66	PA	(Denmark) Mikkel Gaarde Pedersen	3
(Germany) / WTM by Rinaldi Racing; (Germany) / Rinaldi Racing	Ligier JS P325	71	PA	(Germany) Stefan Aust	All
(Germany) / WTM by Rinaldi Racing; (Germany) / Rinaldi Racing	Ligier JS P325	71	PA	(Germany) Felipe Fernández Laser	All
(Denmark) High Class Racing	Ligier JS P325	20	P3	(Denmark) Philip Lindberg	All
(Denmark) High Class Racing	Ligier JS P325	20	P3	(Spain) Maximus Mayer	All
(Denmark) High Class Racing	Ligier JS P325	49	PA	(Denmark) Anders Fjordbach	1–4
(Denmark) High Class Racing	Ligier JS P325	49	PA	(United States) Mark Patterson	1–4
(Denmark) High Class Racing	Ligier JS P325	49	PA	(France) Gaël Julien	5–6
(Denmark) High Class Racing	Ligier JS P325	49	PA	(Germany) Thomas Kiefer	5
(Denmark) High Class Racing	Ligier JS P325	49	PA	(Iceland) Auðunn Guðmundsson	6
(Denmark) High Class Racing	Ligier JS P325	94	PA	(United States) Seth Lucas	3
(Denmark) High Class Racing	Ligier JS P325	94	PA	(Denmark) Jens Reno Møller	3
(Italy) TS Corse	Duqueine D09	24	PA	(Poland) Przemysław Pieniążek	3
(Italy) TS Corse	Duqueine D09	24	PA	(Poland) Robin Rogalski	3
(Germany) Reiter Engineering	Ligier JS P325	25	P3	(Switzerland) Miklas Born	All
(Germany) Reiter Engineering	Ligier JS P325	25	P3	(Hungary) Bence Válint	All
(Germany) Reiter Engineering	Ligier JS P325	77	PA	(Austria) Horst Felbermayr Jr.	All
(Germany) Reiter Engineering	Ligier JS P325	77	PA	(Austria) Horst Felix Felbermayr	All
(Czech Republic) Bretton Racing	Ligier JS P325	26	P3	(United Kingdom) Haydn Chance	1–3
(Czech Republic) Bretton Racing	Ligier JS P325	26	P3	(Switzerland) Grégory de Sybourg	1–3
(Czech Republic) Bretton Racing	Ligier JS P325	26	P3	(Netherlands) Dane Arendsen	4
(Czech Republic) Bretton Racing	Ligier JS P325	26	P3	(Republic of Ireland) Brandon McCaughan	4
(Czech Republic) Bretton Racing	Ligier JS P325	26	P3	(France) Sacha Lehmann	5–6
(Czech Republic) Bretton Racing	Ligier JS P325	26	P3	(Colombia) Pedro Juan Moreno	5
(Czech Republic) Bretton Racing	Ligier JS P325	26	P3	(United Kingdom) Kristian Brookes	6
(Czech Republic) Bretton Racing	Ligier JS P325	53	P3	(France) Marius Fossard	3
(Czech Republic) Bretton Racing	Ligier JS P325	53	P3	(United Kingdom) Ewan Thomas	3
(Czech Republic) Bretton Racing	Ligier JS P325	62	PA	(United Kingdom) Ben Stone	All
(Czech Republic) Bretton Racing	Ligier JS P325	62	PA	(Netherlands) Dane Arendsen	1–3
(Czech Republic) Bretton Racing	Ligier JS P325	62	PA	(United Kingdom) Haydn Chance	4–6
(United Kingdom) P4 Racing	Ligier JS P325	27	PA	(United Kingdom) Andrew Ferguson	All
(United Kingdom) P4 Racing	Ligier JS P325	27	PA	(United Kingdom) Louis Hamilton-Smith	All
(France) 23Events Racing	Ligier JS P325	28	PA	(United Kingdom) Terrence Woodward	All
(France) 23Events Racing	Ligier JS P325	28	PA	(France) Tim Mérieux	1–3
(France) 23Events Racing	Ligier JS P325	28	PA	(Australia) James Winslow	4–5
(France) 23Events Racing	Ligier JS P325	28	PA	(Taiwan) Chun-Ting Chou	6
(France) 23Events Racing	Ligier JS P325	50	P3	(Switzerland) Léna Bühler	All
(France) 23Events Racing	Ligier JS P325	50	P3	(Italy) Matteo Quintarelli	All
(France) Forestier Racing by VPS	Ligier JS P325	29	P3	(France) Romain Favre	All
(France) Forestier Racing by VPS	Ligier JS P325	29	P3	(France) Louis Rousset	All
(France) Forestier Racing by VPS	Ligier JS P325	92	P3	(France) Luciano Morano	All
(France) Forestier Racing by VPS	Ligier JS P325	92	P3	(France) Charles Roussanne	All
(Spain) CD Sport	Duqueine D09	30	P3	(France) Thomas Imbourg	All
(Spain) CD Sport	Duqueine D09	30	P3	(France) Arthur Rogeon	All
(Spain) CD Sport	Duqueine D09	31	PA	(Switzerland) Kévin Rabin	All
(Spain) CD Sport	Duqueine D09	31	PA	(Lebanon) Shahan Sarkissian	1–2, 4–5
(Spain) CD Sport	Duqueine D09	31	PA	(Belgium) Stéphane Lémeret	3
(Spain) CD Sport	Duqueine D09	31	PA	(United Kingdom) James Sweetnam	6
(Switzerland) CLX Motorsport	Ligier JS P325	37	P3	(France) Adrien Closmenil	3
(Switzerland) CLX Motorsport	Ligier JS P325	37	P3	(Denmark) Theodor Jensen	3
(Switzerland) CLX Motorsport	Ligier JS P325	87	P3	(France) Pierre-Alexandre Provost	All
(Switzerland) CLX Motorsport	Ligier JS P325	87	P3	(Italy) Alvise Rodella	All
(Switzerland) CLX Motorsport	Ligier JS P325	97	P3	(Switzerland) David Droux	All
(Switzerland) CLX Motorsport	Ligier JS P325	97	P3	(Switzerland) Cédric Oltramare	All
(Australia) GG Classics	Ligier JS P325	58	PA	(Australia) Fraser Ross	All
(Australia) GG Classics	Ligier JS P325	58	PA	(Australia) George Nakas	1–3, 6
(Australia) GG Classics	Ligier JS P325	58	PA	(United Kingdom) James Sweetnam	4–5
(France) M Racing	Ligier JS P325	64	PA	(Austria) Michael Doppelmayr	All
(France) M Racing	Ligier JS P325	64	PA	(Germany) Pierre Kaffer	All
(France) M Racing	Ligier JS P325	68	P3	(France) Quentin Antonel	3
(France) M Racing	Ligier JS P325	68	P3	(France) Vladislav Lomko (Note: Lomko is Russian, but he competes under a French licence as Russian national emblems were banned by the FIA following the Russian invasion of Ukraine.)	3
(Germany) Gebhardt Motorsport	Duqueine D09	70	P3	(Colombia) Óscar Tunjo	All
(Germany) Gebhardt Motorsport	Duqueine D09	70	P3	(Germany) Valentino Catalano	1–3, 5–6
(Germany) Gebhardt Motorsport	Duqueine D09	70	P3	(United States) Danny Soufi	4
(France) R-ace GP	Duqueine D09	85	P3	(France) Hadrien David	All
(France) R-ace GP	Duqueine D09	85	P3	(Germany) Hugo Schwarze	All
(France) R-ace GP	Duqueine D09	86	P3	(France) Edgar Pierre	All
(France) R-ace GP	Duqueine D09	86	P3	(Sweden) Joel Granfors	1–2
(France) R-ace GP	Duqueine D09	86	P3	(Japan) Jin Nakamura	3
(France) R-ace GP	Duqueine D09	86	P3	(France) Antoine Doquin	4–6
(France) R-ace GP	Duqueine D09	88	PA	(France) Romano Ricci	All
(France) R-ace GP	Duqueine D09	88	PA	(France) Fabien Lavergne	1–4
(France) R-ace GP	Duqueine D09	88	PA	(United Kingdom) Ewan Thomas	5
(France) R-ace GP	Duqueine D09	88	PA	(Argentina) Nano López	6
(Belgium) Motorsport98	Ligier JS P325	98	PA	(Belgium) Eric De Doncker	All
(Belgium) Motorsport98	Ligier JS P325	98	PA	(France) Gillian Henrion	All
(Netherlands) More Motorsport	Ligier JS P325	99	PA	(Netherlands) Mark van der Snel	All
(Netherlands) More Motorsport	Ligier JS P325	99	PA	(Netherlands) Max van der Snel	All

Icon	MISC
P3	LMP3
PA	LMP3 Pro-Am

- Nicolas Schatz and Dan Skočdopole were scheduled to compete for ANS Motorsport and Bretton Racing respectively, but withdrew prior to the start of the season.
- Robert Vișoiu was scheduled to compete for TS Corse, but did not appear at any rounds.
- Daniel Keilwitz was scheduled to compete for Rinaldi Racing, but was replaced by Griffin Peebles.
- Markus Pommer was scheduled to compete for Gebhardt Motorsport, but later moved to ANS Motorsport. He was replaced by Óscar Tunjo.

=== GT3 ===
Entrant/Team	Chassis	Engine	No.	Drivers	Rounds
(United Kingdom) Optimum Motorsport	McLaren 720S GT3 Evo	McLaren M840T 4.0 L Turbo V8	5	(United Kingdom) Bradley Ellis	3
(United Kingdom) Optimum Motorsport	McLaren 720S GT3 Evo	McLaren M840T 4.0 L Turbo V8	5	(United Kingdom) Nick Halstead	3
(France) Code Racing Development	Aston Martin Vantage AMR GT3 Evo	Aston Martin M177 4.0 L Turbo V8	11	(Austria) Philipp Sager	1–5
(France) Code Racing Development	Aston Martin Vantage AMR GT3 Evo	Aston Martin M177 4.0 L Turbo V8	11	(United States) Rory van der Steur	1–4
(France) Code Racing Development	Aston Martin Vantage AMR GT3 Evo	Aston Martin M177 4.0 L Turbo V8	11	(France) Valentin Hasse-Clot	5
(France) Code Racing Development	Aston Martin Vantage AMR GT3 Evo	Aston Martin M177 4.0 L Turbo V8	11	(France) Pascal Huteau	6
(France) Code Racing Development	Aston Martin Vantage AMR GT3 Evo	Aston Martin M177 4.0 L Turbo V8	11	(Switzerland) David Kullmann	6
(Germany) GetSpeed	Mercedes-AMG GT3 Evo	Mercedes-AMG M159 6.2 L V8	14	(United States) Anthony Bartone	3
(Germany) GetSpeed	Mercedes-AMG GT3 Evo	Mercedes-AMG M159 6.2 L V8	14	(Luxembourg) Steve Jans	3
(Switzerland) Kessel Racing	Ferrari 296 GT3	Ferrari F163 3.0 L Turbo V6	17	(Italy) Andrea Belicchi	All
(Switzerland) Kessel Racing	Ferrari 296 GT3	Ferrari F163 3.0 L Turbo V6	17	(Italy) Lorenzo Innocenti	All
(Switzerland) Kessel Racing	Ferrari 296 GT3	Ferrari F163 3.0 L Turbo V6	33	(Turkey) Murat Çuhadaroğlu	All
(Switzerland) Kessel Racing	Ferrari 296 GT3	Ferrari F163 3.0 L Turbo V6	33	(Italy) David Fumanelli	All
(Italy) AF Corse	Ferrari 296 GT3	Ferrari F163 3.0 L Turbo V6	21	(Switzerland) Gino Forgione	3
(Italy) AF Corse	Ferrari 296 GT3	Ferrari F163 3.0 L Turbo V6	21	(Italy) Michele Rugolo	3
(Italy) AF Corse	Ferrari 296 GT3	Ferrari F163 3.0 L Turbo V6	51	(Italy) Alessandro Cozzi	All
(Italy) AF Corse	Ferrari 296 GT3	Ferrari F163 3.0 L Turbo V6	51	(Italy) Eliseo Donno	All
(Italy) AF Corse	Ferrari 296 GT3	Ferrari F163 3.0 L Turbo V6	52	(Monaco) Vincent Abril	3
(Italy) AF Corse	Ferrari 296 GT3	Ferrari F163 3.0 L Turbo V6	52	(Belgium) Laurent de Meeûs	3
(Italy) AF Corse	Ferrari 296 GT3	Ferrari F163 3.0 L Turbo V6	55	(Italy) Leonardo Colavita	3
(Italy) AF Corse	Ferrari 296 GT3	Ferrari F163 3.0 L Turbo V6	55	(Switzerland) Christoph Ulrich	3
(Spain) Biogas Motorsport	Ferrari 296 GT3	Ferrari F163 3.0 L Turbo V6	23	(Spain) Marc Carol	All
(Spain) Biogas Motorsport	Ferrari 296 GT3	Ferrari F163 3.0 L Turbo V6	23	(Spain) Josep Mayola	All
(Belgium) Team WRT	BMW M4 GT3 Evo	BMW P58 3.0 L Turbo I6	38	(Sweden) Gustav Bergström	3
(Belgium) Team WRT	BMW M4 GT3 Evo	BMW P58 3.0 L Turbo I6	38	(Canada) Samantha Tan	3
(France) Racing Spirit of Léman	Aston Martin Vantage AMR GT3 Evo	Aston Martin M177 4.0 L Turbo V8	59	(United States) Anthony McIntosh	3
(France) Racing Spirit of Léman	Aston Martin Vantage AMR GT3 Evo	Aston Martin M177 4.0 L Turbo V8	59	(Canada) Parker Thompson	3
(Austria) Team Motopark	Mercedes-AMG GT3 Evo	Mercedes-AMG M159 6.2 L V8	65	(Austria) Lukas Dunner	1–4
(Austria) Team Motopark	Mercedes-AMG GT3 Evo	Mercedes-AMG M159 6.2 L V8	65	(Germany) Heiko Neumann	1–4
(Germany) Iron Lynx – Proton	Porsche 911 GT3 R (992)	Porsche M97/80 4.2 L Flat-6	73	(Italy) Matteo Cressoni	3
(Germany) Iron Lynx – Proton	Porsche 911 GT3 R (992)	Porsche M97/80 4.2 L Flat-6	73	(Germany) Patrick Dinkeldein	3
(Italy) Iron Dames	Porsche 911 GT3 R (992)	Porsche M97/80 4.2 L Flat-6	83	(Spain) Marta García	All
(Italy) Iron Dames	Porsche 911 GT3 R (992)	Porsche M97/80 4.2 L Flat-6	83	(Belgium) Vanina Ickx	All
(United Kingdom) Blackthorn	Aston Martin Vantage AMR GT3 Evo	Aston Martin M177 4.0 L Turbo V8	91	(United Kingdom) Charles Bateman	6
(United Kingdom) Blackthorn	Aston Martin Vantage AMR GT3 Evo	Aston Martin M177 4.0 L Turbo V8	91	(United Kingdom) Alex Martin	6
(Italy) Ebimotors	Porsche 911 GT3 R (992)	Porsche M97/80 4.2 L Flat-6	95	(Italy) Fabrizio Broggi	All
(Italy) Ebimotors	Porsche 911 GT3 R (992)	Porsche M97/80 4.2 L Flat-6	95	(Romania) Sergiu Nicolae	1–3
(Italy) Ebimotors	Porsche 911 GT3 R (992)	Porsche M97/80 4.2 L Flat-6	95	(Italy) Sabino De Castro	4–6

- Bailey Voisin was scheduled to compete for Code Racing Development, but did not appear at any rounds.

== Race results ==
Bold indicates the overall winner.

Round		Circuit	LMP3 Winners	LMP3 Pro-Am Winners	GT3 Winners
1		(Spain) Catalunya	**(Switzerland) No. 97 CLX Motorsport**	(Germany) No. 66 Rinaldi Racing	(Switzerland) No. 33 Kessel Racing
1		(Spain) Catalunya	**(Switzerland) David Droux** **(Switzerland) Cédric Oltramare**	(Germany) Steve Parrow (Australia) Griffin Peebles	(Turkey) Murat Çuhadaroğlu (Italy) David Fumanelli
2		(France) Le Castellet	**(Switzerland) No. 87 CLX Motorsport**	(France) No. 84 ANS Motorsport	(France) No. 11 Code Racing Development
2		(France) Le Castellet	**(France) Pierre-Alexandre Provost** **(Italy) Alvise Rodella**	(France) Julien Lemoine (France) Paul Trojani	(Austria) Philipp Sager (United States) Rory van der Steur
3	R1	(France) Le Mans (report)	**(Switzerland) No. 37 CLX Motorsport**	(Germany) No. 71 Rinaldi Racing	(Germany) No. 14 GetSpeed
3	R1	(France) Le Mans (report)	**(France) Adrien Closmenil** **(Denmark) Theodor Jensen**	(Germany) Stefan Aust (Germany) Felipe Fernández Laser	(United States) Anthony Bartone (Luxembourg) Steve Jans
3	R2	(France) Le Mans (report)	**(France) No. 50 23Events Racing**	(Luxembourg) No. 2 DKR Engineering	(Austria) No. 65 Team Motopark
3	R2	(France) Le Mans (report)	**(Switzerland) Léna Bühler** **(Italy) Matteo Quintarelli**	(France) Thomas Laurent (Estonia) Antti Rammo	(Austria) Lukas Dunner (Germany) Heiko Neumann
4		(Belgium) Spa-Francorchamps	**(France) No. 85 R-ace GP**	(Belgium) No. 98 Motorsport98	(Switzerland) No. 33 Kessel Racing
4		(Belgium) Spa-Francorchamps	**(France) Hadrien David** **(Germany) Hugo Schwarze**	(Belgium) Eric De Doncker (France) Gillian Henrion	(Turkey) Murat Çuhadaroğlu (Italy) David Fumanelli
5		(United Kingdom) Silverstone	**(France) No. 85 R-ace GP**	(France) No. 28 23Events Racing	(Switzerland) No. 83 Iron Dames
5		(United Kingdom) Silverstone	**(France) Hadrien David** **(Germany) Hugo Schwarze**	(United Kingdom) Terrence Woodward (United Kingdom) James Winslow	(Belgium) Vanina Ickx (Spain) Marta García
6		(Portugal) Portimão	**(France) No. 85 R-ace GP**	(Belgium) No. 98 Motorsport98	(Switzerland) No. 33 Kessel Racing
6		(Portugal) Portimão	**(France) Hadrien David** **(Germany) Hugo Schwarze**	(Belgium) Eric De Doncker (France) Gillian Henrion	(Turkey) Murat Çuhadaroğlu (Italy) David Fumanelli

== Championship standings ==
Points are awarded according to the following structure:

Position	1st	2nd	3rd	4th	5th	6th	7th	8th	9th	10th	Pole
Points	25	18	15	12	10	8	6	4	2	1	1
Le Mans	15	9	7	6	5	4	3	2	1		1

=== LMP3 Drivers' Championship ===
Pos.	Driver	Team	BAR (Spain)	LEC (France)	LMS (France)		SPA (Belgium)	SIL (United Kingdom)	POR (Portugal)	Points
1	(France) Hadrien David	(France) R-ace GP	8	5	2	2	**1**	**1**	**1**	116
1	(Germany) Hugo Schwarze	(France) R-ace GP	8	5	2	2	**1**	**1**	**1**	116
2	(France) Luciano Morano	(France) Forestier Racing by VPS	10	4	4	4	2	4	3	71
2	(France) Charles Roussanne	(France) Forestier Racing by VPS	10	4	4	4	2	4	3	71
3	(France) Romain Favre	(France) Forestier Racing by VPS	3	13	5	11	4	2	2	70
3	(France) Louis Rousset	(France) Forestier Racing by VPS	3	13	5	11	4	2	2	70
4	(France) Pierre-Alexandre Provost	(Switzerland) CLX Motorsport	2	**1**	9	21	11	3	Ret	62
4	(Italy) Alvise Rodella	(Switzerland) CLX Motorsport	2	**1**	9	21	11	3	Ret	62
5	(United Kingdom) Theo Micouris	(Poland) Team Virage	4	8	3	6	3	8	5	58
6	(Switzerland) David Droux	(Switzerland) CLX Motorsport	1	2	14	18	9	7	7	57
6	(Switzerland) Cédric Oltramare	(Switzerland) CLX Motorsport	1	2	14	18	9	7	7	57
7	(Switzerland) Léna Bühler	(France) 23Events Racing	**5**	9	7	1	5	5	9	55
7	(Italy) Matteo Quintarelli	(France) 23Events Racing	**5**	9	7	1	5	5	9	55
8	(Switzerland) Miklas Born	(Germany) Reiter Engineering	9	3	8	5	6	9	Ret	36
8	(Hungary) Bence Válint	(Germany) Reiter Engineering	9	3	8	5	6	9	Ret	36
9	(France) Sacha Lehmann	(Poland) Team Virage	4	8	3	6				33
9	(France) Sacha Lehmann	(Czech Republic) Bretton Racing						Ret	8	33
10	(Denmark) Sebastian Gravlund	(Poland) Team Virage			6	19	3	8	5	29
11	(Colombia) Óscar Tunjo	(Germany) Gebhardt Motorsport	Ret	Ret	10	3	Ret	10	4	22
12	(Germany) Valentino Catalano	(Germany) Gebhardt Motorsport	Ret	Ret	10	3		10	4	22
13	(France) Edgar Pierre	(France) R-ace GP	6	7	15	Ret	7	11	12	20
14	(France) Arthur Rogeon	(Spain) CD Sport	7	Ret	16	13	Ret	6	15	14
14	(France) Thomas Imbourg	(Spain) CD Sport	7	Ret	16	13	Ret	6	15	14
15	(Sweden) Joel Granfors	(France) R-ace GP	6	7						14
16	(Germany) Markus Pommer	(France) ANS Motorsport	13	6	18	20	8	14	14	12
16	(Switzerland) Axel Gnos	(France) ANS Motorsport	13	6	18	20	8	14	14	12
17	(United States) Wyatt Brichacek	(Luxembourg) DKR Engineering	16	10	17	17	15	12	6	9
17	(United Kingdom) Freddie Tomlinson	(Luxembourg) DKR Engineering	16	10	17	17	15	12	6	9
18	(France) Antoine Doquin	(France) R-ace GP					7	11	12	6
19	(Switzerland) Samir Ben	(Poland) Team Virage	14	11	12	9	10	13	11	5
19	(South Africa) Mikaeel Pitamber	(Poland) Team Virage	14	11	12	9	10	13	11	5
20	(United Kingdom) Kristian Brookes	(Czech Republic) Bretton Racing							8	4
21	(Denmark) Philip Lindberg	(Denmark) High Class Racing	15	12	19	10	12	17	10	3
21	(Spain) Maximus Mayer	(Denmark) High Class Racing	15	12	19	10	12	17	10	3
22	(United Kingdom) Tom Fleming	(United Kingdom) Nielsen Racing	11	Ret	20	15	13	Ret	16	0
22	(United Kingdom) Colin Noble	(United Kingdom) Nielsen Racing	11	Ret	20	15	13	Ret	16	0
23	(Colombia) Henry Cubides Olarte	(United Kingdom) Nielsen Racing	12	14	Ret	16	Ret	16	13	0
23	(Spain) Mikkel Kristensen	(United Kingdom) Nielsen Racing	12	14	Ret	16	Ret	16	13	0
24	(United Kingdom) Haydn Chance	(Czech Republic) Bretton Racing	Ret	Ret	13	14				0
24	(Switzerland) Grégory de Sybourg	(Czech Republic) Bretton Racing	Ret	Ret	13	14				0
25	(Netherlands) Dane Arendsen	(Czech Republic) Bretton Racing					14			0
25	(Republic of Ireland) Brandon McCaughan	(Czech Republic) Bretton Racing					14			0
26	(Japan) Jin Nakamura	(France) R-ace GP			15	Ret				0
NC	(United States) Danny Soufi	(Germany) Gebhardt Motorsport					Ret			0
NC	(Colombia) Pedro Juan Moreno	(Czech Republic) Bretton Racing						Ret		0
Pos.	Driver	Team	BAR (Spain)	LEC (France)	LMS (France)		SPA (Belgium)	SIL (United Kingdom)	POR (Portugal)	Points

Key
Colour	Result
Gold	Race winner
Silver	2nd place
Bronze	3rd place
Green	Points finish
Blue	Non-points finish
Blue	Non-classified finish (NC)
Purple	Did not finish (Ret)
Black	Disqualified (DSQ)
Black	Excluded (EX)
White	Did not start (DNS)
White	Race cancelled (C)
White	Withdrew (WD)
Blank	Did not participate

**Bold** – Pole

Italics – Fastest Lap

=== LMP3 Teams' Championship ===
Pos.	Team	Car	BAR (Spain)	LEC (France)	LMS (France)		SPA (Belgium)	SIL (United Kingdom)	POR (Portugal)	Points
1	(France) #85 R-ace GP	Duqueine D09	8	5	2	2	**1**	**1**	**1**	116
2	(France) #92 Forestier Racing by VPS	Ligier JS P325	10	4	4	4	2	4	3	71
3	(France) #29 Forestier Racing by VPS	Ligier JS P325	3	13	5	11	4	2	2	70
4	(Switzerland) #87 CLX Motorsport	Ligier JS P325	2	**1**	9	21	11	3	Ret	62
5	(Poland) #16 Team Virage	Ligier JS P325	4	8	3	6	3	8	5	58
6	(Switzerland) #97 CLX Motorsport	Ligier JS P325	1	2	14	18	9	7	7	57
7	(France) #50 23Events Racing	Ligier JS P325	**5**	9	7	1	5	5	9	55
8	(Germany) #25 Reiter Engineering	Ligier JS P325	9	3	8	5	6	9	Ret	36
9	(Germany) #70 Gebhardt Motorsport	Duqueine D09	Ret	Ret	10	3	Ret	10	4	22
10	(France) #86 R-ace GP	Duqueine D09	6	7	15	Ret	7	11	12	20
11	(Spain) #30 CD Sport	Duqueine D09	7	Ret	16	13	Ret	6	15	14
12	(France) #6 ANS Motorsport	Ligier JS P325	13	6	18	20	8	14	14	12
13	(Luxembourg) #3 DKR Engineering	Ginetta G61-LT-P3 Evo	16	10	17	17	15	12	6	9
14	(Poland) #74 Team Virage	Ligier JS P325	14	11	12	9	10	13	11	5
15	(Czech Republic) #26 Bretton Racing	Ligier JS P325	Ret	Ret	13	14	14	Ret	8	4
16	(Denmark) #20 High Class Racing	Ligier JS P325	15	12	19	10	12	17	10	3
17	(United Kingdom) #7 Nielsen Racing	ADESS AD25	11	Ret	20	15	13	Ret	16	0
18	(United Kingdom) #4 Nielsen Racing	ADESS AD25	12	14	Ret	16	Ret	16	13	0
Pos.	Team	Chassis	BAR (Spain)	LEC (France)	LMS (France)		SPA (Belgium)	SIL (United Kingdom)	POR (Portugal)	Points

=== LMP3 Pro-Am Drivers' Championship ===
Pos.	Driver	Team	BAR (Spain)	LEC (France)	LMS (France)		SPA (Belgium)	SIL (United Kingdom)	POR (Portugal)	Points
1	(Belgium) Eric De Doncker	(Belgium) Motorsport98	12	2	3	4	1	8	1	88
1	(France) Gillian Henrion	(Belgium) Motorsport98	12	2	3	4	1	8	1	88
2	(Germany) Steve Parrow	(Germany) Rinaldi Racing	1	9	7	Ret	2	2	2	85
3	(Australia) Griffin Peebles	(Germany) Rinaldi Racing	1	9			2	2	2	81
4	(Germany) Stefan Aust	(Germany) Rinaldi Racing	2	3	1	2	Ret	4	Ret	75
4	(Germany) Felipe Fernández Laser	(Germany) Rinaldi Racing	2	3	1	2	Ret	4	Ret	75
5	(United Kingdom) Terrence Woodward	(France) 23Events Racing	Ret	**Ret**	4	Ret	8	1	**3**	55
6	(France) Julien Lemoine	(France) ANS Motorsport	**8**	1	9	8	**9**	3	12	55
6	(France) Paul Trojani	(France) ANS Motorsport	**8**	1	9	8	**9**	3	12	55
7	(Netherlands) Mark van der Snel	(Netherlands) More Motorsport	4	5	13	6	11	5	Ret	38
7	(Netherlands) Max van der Snel	(Netherlands) More Motorsport	4	5	13	6	11	5	Ret	38
8	(Australia) James Winslow	(France) 23Events Racing					8	1		31
9	(France) Romano Ricci	(France) R-ace GP	6	6	8	3	Ret	10	Ret	29
10	(Australia) Fraser Ross	(Australia) GG Classics	3	14	Ret	17	Ret	6	7	29
11	(France) Fabien Lavergne	(France) R-ace GP	6	6	8	3	Ret			28
12	(Switzerland) Kévin Rabin	(Spain) CD Sport	DNS	4	12	12	4	11	9	28
13	(Austria) Horst Felbermayr Jr.	(Germany) Reiter Engineering	5	8	6	11	Ret		6	28
13	(Austria) Horst Felix Felbermayr	(Germany) Reiter Engineering	5	8	6	11	Ret		6	28
14	(Lebanon) Shahan Sarkissian	(Spain) CD Sport	DNS	4			4	11		24
15	(United Kingdom) Andrew Ferguson	(United Kingdom) P4 Racing	DNS	DNS	14	18	7	7	5	24
15	(United Kingdom) Louis Hamilton-Smith	(United Kingdom) P4 Racing	DNS	DNS	14	18	7	7	5	24
16	(Australia) George Nakas	(Australia) GG Classics	3	14	Ret	17			7	21
17	(Taiwan) Chun-Ting Chou	(France) 23Events Racing							**3**	16
18	(United Kingdom) Timothy Creswick	(Poland) Inter Europol Competition					3			15
18	(United States) Bijoy Garg	(Poland) Inter Europol Competition					3			15
19	(Germany) Christian Gisy	(France) Racing Spirit of Léman					5	9	11	13
19	(Germany) Ralf Kelleners	(France) Racing Spirit of Léman					5	9	11	13
20	(Portugal) José Cautela	(Poland) Inter Europol Competition							4	12
20	(United States) Shawn Rashid	(Poland) Inter Europol Competition							4	12
21	(Sweden) William Karlsson	(Poland) Inter Europol Competition			5	5				12
21	(United Kingdom) Christian Short	(Poland) Inter Europol Competition			5	5				12
22	(United Kingdom) James Sweetnam	(Australia) GG Classics					Ret	6		12
22	(United Kingdom) James Sweetnam	(Spain) CD Sport							9	12
23	(France) Tim Mérieux	(France) 23Events Racing	Ret	**Ret**	4	Ret				8
24	(Germany) Sebastian Schmitt	(France) Racing Spirit of Léman	7		Ret	13				6
24	(Germany) Dominik Schraml	(France) Racing Spirit of Léman	7		Ret	13				6
25	(France) Antoine Doquin	(France) Racing Spirit of Léman		7						6
25	(France) Jean-Ludovic Foubert	(France) Racing Spirit of Léman		7						6
26	(Hong Kong) David Pun	(Poland) Inter Europol Competition			10	7				5
26	(Brazil) Sérgio Sette Câmara	(Poland) Inter Europol Competition			10	7				5
27	(Austria) Michael Doppelmayr	(France) M Racing	10	13	18	15	10	12	10	5
27	(Germany) Pierre Kaffer	(France) M Racing	10	13	18	15	10	12	10	5
28	(Denmark) Mikkel Gaarde Pedersen	(Germany) Rinaldi Racing			7	Ret				4
29	(Denmark) Anders Fjordbach	(Denmark) High Class Racing	9	11	17	9				4
29	(United States) Mark Patterson	(Denmark) High Class Racing	9	11	17	9				4
30	(United States) Ari Balogh	(Poland) Inter Europol Competition	11	10						1
30	(Canada) Garett Grist	(Poland) Inter Europol Competition	11	10						1
31	(United Kingdom) Ewan Thomas	(France) R-ace GP						10		1
32	(France) Gaël Julien	(Denmark) High Class Racing						**DSQ** (Note: The #49 LMP3 Pro-Am class winner was disqualified after failing to reach Parc Ferme under its own power.)	Ret	1
33	(Germany) Thomas Kiefer	(Denmark) High Class Racing						**DSQ**		1
34	(United Kingdom) Ben Stone	(Czech Republic) Bretton Racing	Ret	12	15	14	12	Ret	Ret	0
35	(Belgium) Stéphane Lémeret	(Spain) CD Sport			12	12				0
36	(Netherlands) Dane Arendsen	(Czech Republic) Bretton Racing	Ret	12	15	14				0
37	(United Kingdom) Haydn Chance	(Czech Republic) Bretton Racing					12	Ret	Ret	0
NC	(Iceland) Auðunn Guðmundsson	(Denmark) High Class Racing							Ret	0
NC	(Argentina) Nano López	(France) R-ace GP							Ret	0
Pos.	Driver	Team	BAR (Spain)	LEC (France)	LMS (France)		SPA (Belgium)	SIL (United Kingdom)	POR (Portugal)	Points

Key
Colour	Result
Gold	Race winner
Silver	2nd place
Bronze	3rd place
Green	Points finish
Blue	Non-points finish
Blue	Non-classified finish (NC)
Purple	Did not finish (Ret)
Black	Disqualified (DSQ)
Black	Excluded (EX)
White	Did not start (DNS)
White	Race cancelled (C)
White	Withdrew (WD)
Blank	Did not participate

**Bold** – Pole

Italics – Fastest Lap

=== LMP3 Pro-Am Teams' Championship ===
Pos.	Team	Car	BAR (Spain)	LEC (France)	LMS (France)		SPA (Belgium)	SIL (United Kingdom)	POR (Portugal)	Points
1	(Belgium) #98 Motorsport98	Ligier JS P325	12	2	3	4	1	8	1	88
2	(Germany) #66 Rinaldi Racing	Ligier JS P325	1	9	7	Ret	2	2	2	85
3	(Germany) #71 Rinaldi Racing	Ligier JS P325	2	3	1	2	Ret	4	Ret	75
4	(France) #28 23Events Racing	Ligier JS P325	Ret	**Ret**	4	Ret	8	1	**3**	55
5	(France) #84 ANS Motorsport	Ligier JS P325	**8**	1	9	8	**9**	3	12	55
6	(Poland) #34 Inter Europol Competition	Ligier JS P325	11	10	5	5	3		4	40
7	(Netherlands) #99 More Motorsport	Ligier JS P325	4	5	13	6	11	5	Ret	38
8	(France) #88 R-ace GP	Duqueine D09	6	6	8	3	Ret	10	Ret	29
9	(Australia) #58 GG Classics	Ligier JS P325	3	14	Ret	17	Ret	6	7	29
10	(Spain) #31 CD Sport	Duqueine D09	DNS	4	12	12	4	11	9	28
11	(Germany) #77 Reiter Engineering	Ligier JS P325	5	8	6	11	Ret		6	28
12	(France) #10 Racing Spirit of Léman	Ligier JS P325	7	7	Ret	13	5	9	11	25
13	(United Kingdom) #27 P4 Racing	Ligier JS P325	DNS	DNS	14	18	7	7	5	24
14	(Poland) #43 Inter Europol Competition	Ligier JS P325			10	7				5
15	(Denmark) #49 High Class Racing	Ligier JS P325	9	11	17	9		**DSQ**	Ret	5
16	(France) #64 M Racing	Ligier JS P325	10	13	18	15	10	12	10	5
17	(Czech Republic) #62 Bretton Racing	Ligier JS P325	Ret	12	15	14	12	Ret	Ret	0
Pos.	Team	Chassis	BAR (Spain)	LEC (France)	LMS (France)		SPA (Belgium)	SIL (United Kingdom)	POR (Portugal)	Points

=== GT3 Drivers' Championship ===
Pos.	Driver	Team	BAR (Spain)	LEC (France)	LMS (France)		SPA (Belgium)	SIL (United Kingdom)	POR (Portugal)	Points
1	(Italy) Alessandro Cozzi	(Italy) AF Corse	6	2	**2**	6	2	2	2	104
1	(Italy) Eliseo Donno	(Italy) AF Corse	6	2	**2**	6	2	2	2	104
2	(Turkey) Murat Çuhadaroğlu	(Switzerland) Kessel Racing	1	5	DNS	Ret	1	5	1	95
2	(Italy) David Fumanelli	(Switzerland) Kessel Racing	1	5	DNS	Ret	1	5	1	95
3	(Italy) Andrea Belicchi	(Switzerland) Kessel Racing	3	**3**	4	9	**6**	4	4	79
3	(Italy) Lorenzo Innocenti	(Switzerland) Kessel Racing	3	**3**	4	9	**6**	4	4	79
4	(Spain) Marta García	(Italy) Iron Dames	Ret	4	WD	WD	3	**1**	5	63
4	(Belgium) Vanina Ickx	(Italy) Iron Dames	Ret	4	WD	WD	3	**1**	5	63
5	(Austria) Philipp Sager	(France) Code Racing Development	2	1	9	Ret	8	6		60
6	(United States) Rory van der Steur	(France) Code Racing Development	2	1	9	Ret	8			52
7	(Spain) Marc Carol	(Spain) Biogas Motorsport	4	7	8	Ret	4	3	Ret	51
7	(Spain) Josep Mayola	(Spain) Biogas Motorsport	4	7	8	Ret	4	3	Ret	51
8	(Austria) Lukas Dunner	(Austria) Team Motopark	**Ret**	6	13	1	5			38
8	(Germany) Heiko Neumann	(Austria) Team Motopark	**Ret**	6	13	1	5			38
9	(Romania) Fabrizio Broggi	(Italy) Ebimotors	5	Ret	7	7	7	Ret	6	38
10	(Romania) Sergiu Nicolae	(Italy) Ebimotors	5	Ret	7	7				24
11	(France) Pascal Huteau	(France) Code Racing Development							3	16
11	(Switzerland) David Kullmann	(France) Code Racing Development							3	16
12	(Italy) Sabino De Castro	(Italy) Ebimotors					7	Ret	6	14
13	(France) Valentin Hasse-Clot	(France) Code Racing Development						6		8
Pos.	Driver	Team	BAR (Spain)	LEC (France)	LMS (France)		SPA (Belgium)	SIL (United Kingdom)	POR (Portugal)	Points

Key
Colour	Result
Gold	Race winner
Silver	2nd place
Bronze	3rd place
Green	Points finish
Blue	Non-points finish
Blue	Non-classified finish (NC)
Purple	Did not finish (Ret)
Black	Disqualified (DSQ)
Black	Excluded (EX)
White	Did not start (DNS)
White	Race cancelled (C)
White	Withdrew (WD)
Blank	Did not participate

**Bold** – Pole

Italics – Fastest Lap

=== GT3 Teams' Championship ===
Pos.	Team	Car	BAR (Spain)	LEC (France)	LMS (France)		SPA (Belgium)	SIL (United Kingdom)	POR (Portugal)	Points
1	(Italy) #51 AF Corse	Ferrari 296 GT3	6	2	**2**	6	2	2	2	104
2	(Switzerland) #33 Kessel Racing	Ferrari 296 GT3	1	5	DNS	Ret	1	5	1	95
3	(Switzerland) #17 Kessel Racing	Ferrari 296 GT3	3	**3**	4	9	**6**	4	4	79
4	(France) #11 Code Racing Development	Aston Martin Vantage AMR GT3 Evo	2	1	9	Ret	8	6	3	76
5	(Italy) #83 Iron Dames	Porsche 911 GT3 R (992)	Ret	4	WD	WD	3	**1**	5	63
6	(Spain) #23 Biogas Motorsport	Ferrari 296 GT3	4	7	8	Ret	4	3	Ret	51
7	(Austria) #65 Team Motopark	Mercedes-AMG GT3 Evo	**Ret**	6	13	1	5			38
8	(Italy) #95 Ebimotors	Porsche 911 GT3 R (992)	5	Ret	7	7	7	Ret	6	38
Pos.	Team	Chassis	BAR (Spain)	LEC (France)	LMS (France)		SPA (Belgium)	SIL (United Kingdom)	POR (Portugal)	Points
