= 2024 GB4 Championship =

British motor racing championship

The 2024 GB4 Championship partnered by the BRDC was the third season of a motor racing championship for open wheel, formula racing cars in Britain. The 2024 season, which was organised by MotorSport Vision, was run over seven triple-header rounds.

GB4 will act as a direct feeder series to higher open-wheel categories, including the existing GB3 Championship partnered by the BRDC. GB4 will run primarily on the same British GT race programme as GB3, and retain many of the same championship partners.

== Teams and drivers ==
Team	No.	Driver	Rounds
(United States) VRD Racing	2	(United States) Ava Dobson	5–6
(United Kingdom) Rossoverde Racing	5	(United Kingdom) Christian Lester	2
(United Kingdom) Elite Motorsport	7	(Isle of Man) Nick Ellis	6
(United Kingdom) Elite Motorsport	21	(United Kingdom) Alisha Palmowski	All
(United Kingdom) Elite Motorsport	38	(United Kingdom) Finn Harrison	All
(United Kingdom) Fox Motorsport	9	(United Kingdom) Megan Bruce	All
(United Kingdom) Fox Motorsport	24	(United Kingdom) Branden Templeton	All
(United Kingdom) Fox Motorsport	49	(United Kingdom) Liam McNeilly	3
(United Kingdom) Luzio.com	11	(United Kingdom) Marcus Luzio	1–3
(United Kingdom) Fortec Motorsport	16	(Sweden) Linus Granfors	All
(United Kingdom) Fortec Motorsport	17	(United Kingdom) Dan Hickey	All
(United Kingdom) Fortec Motorsport	50	(Australia) Jack Taylor	All
(United Kingdom) Idola Motorsport	18	(Poland) Aleksander Mizera	6
(United Kingdom) Arden Motorsport	27	(United Kingdom) Leon Wilson	All
(United Kingdom) Graham Brunton Racing	44	(Canada) Mayer Deonarine	1–3, 5
(United Kingdom) Graham Brunton Racing	45	(Canada) Callum Baxter	All
(United Kingdom) Graham Brunton Racing	48	(Netherlands) Bas Visser	2
(United Kingdom) KMR Sport	66	(United Kingdom) Chloe Grant	All
(United Kingdom) KMR Sport	68	(United Kingdom) Harry Burgoyne Jr.	All
(United Kingdom) KMR Sport	88	(United Kingdom) Lucas Blakeley	4–7
(United Kingdom) KMR Sport	89	(Republic of Ireland) Brandon McCaughan	1–3

- Oldfield Motorsport was announced to participate with Nathan Yu but did not appear at any round.
- Indian Warriors Racing and Preptech UK also announced their entries to the championship but did not appear at any round.

== Race calendar and results ==
The provisional calendar was announced on 22 November 2023. The championship will support the British GT championship at six of its seven meetings.

Round		Circuit	Date	Pole position	Fastest lap	Winning driver	Winning team
1	R1	Oulton Park (International Circuit, Cheshire)	30 March	(Republic of Ireland) Brandon McCaughan	(United Kingdom) Harry Burgoyne Jr.	(United Kingdom) Alisha Palmowski	(United Kingdom) Elite Motorsport
1	R2	Oulton Park (International Circuit, Cheshire)	1 April	(Republic of Ireland) Brandon McCaughan	(United Kingdom) Leon Wilson	(Republic of Ireland) Brandon McCaughan	(United Kingdom) KMR Sport
1	R3	Oulton Park (International Circuit, Cheshire)	1 April		(United Kingdom) Leon Wilson	(Sweden) Linus Granfors	(United Kingdom) Fortec Motorsport
2	R4	Silverstone Circuit (Grand Prix Circuit, Northamptonshire)	27 April	(United Kingdom) Finn Harrison	(Sweden) Linus Granfors	(Sweden) Linus Granfors	(United Kingdom) Fortec Motorsport
2	R5	Silverstone Circuit (Grand Prix Circuit, Northamptonshire)	28 April	(United Kingdom) Finn Harrison	(United Kingdom) Marcus Luzio	(Sweden) Linus Granfors	(United Kingdom) Fortec Motorsport
2	R6	Silverstone Circuit (Grand Prix Circuit, Northamptonshire)	28 April	race cancelled due to adverse weather conditions			
3	R7	Donington Park (Grand Prix Circuit, Leicestershire)	25 May	(Sweden) Linus Granfors	(United Kingdom) Liam McNeilly	(Sweden) Linus Granfors	(United Kingdom) Fortec Motorsport
3	R8	Donington Park (Grand Prix Circuit, Leicestershire)	26 May	(Sweden) Linus Granfors	(Republic of Ireland) Brandon McCaughan	(Republic of Ireland) Brandon McCaughan	(United Kingdom) KMR Sport
3	R9	Donington Park (Grand Prix Circuit, Leicestershire)	26 May		(United Kingdom) Branden Templeton	(United Kingdom) Branden Templeton	(United Kingdom) Fox Motorsport
4	R10	Snetterton Circuit (300 Circuit, Norfolk)	13 July	(United Kingdom) Alisha Palmowski	(United Kingdom) Lucas Blakeley	(United Kingdom) Lucas Blakeley	(United Kingdom) KMR Sport
4	R11	Snetterton Circuit (300 Circuit, Norfolk)	14 July	(United Kingdom) Alisha Palmowski	(United Kingdom) Alisha Palmowski	(United Kingdom) Alisha Palmowski	(United Kingdom) Elite Motorsport
4	R12	Snetterton Circuit (300 Circuit, Norfolk)	14 July		(United Kingdom) Lucas Blakeley	(United Kingdom) Alisha Palmowski	(United Kingdom) Elite Motorsport
5	R13	Silverstone Circuit (Grand Prix Circuit, Northamptonshire)	27 July	(Sweden) Linus Granfors	(Sweden) Linus Granfors	(Sweden) Linus Granfors	(United Kingdom) Fortec Motorsport
5	R14	Silverstone Circuit (Grand Prix Circuit, Northamptonshire)	28 July	(Sweden) Linus Granfors	(United Kingdom) Lucas Blakeley	(United Kingdom) Lucas Blakeley	(United Kingdom) KMR Sport
5	R15	Silverstone Circuit (Grand Prix Circuit, Northamptonshire)	28 July		(United Kingdom) Lucas Blakeley	(United Kingdom) Finn Harrison	(United Kingdom) Elite Motorsport
6	R16	Donington Park (Grand Prix Circuit, Leicestershire)	7 September	(United Kingdom) Finn Harrison	(United Kingdom) Branden Templeton	(United Kingdom) Lucas Blakeley	(United Kingdom) KMR Sport
6	R17	Donington Park (Grand Prix Circuit, Leicestershire)	8 September	(United Kingdom) Finn Harrison	(Sweden) Linus Granfors	(Sweden) Linus Granfors	(United Kingdom) Fortec Motorsport
6	R18	Donington Park (Grand Prix Circuit, Leicestershire)	8 September		(United Kingdom) Lucas Blakeley	(United Kingdom) Harry Burgoyne Jr.	(United Kingdom) KMR Sport
7	R19	Brands Hatch (Grand Prix Circuit, Kent)	28 September	(Sweden) Linus Granfors	(United Kingdom) Lucas Blakeley	(United Kingdom) Harry Burgoyne Jr.	(United Kingdom) KMR Sport
7	R20	Brands Hatch (Grand Prix Circuit, Kent)	29 September	(Sweden) Linus Granfors	(United Kingdom) Lucas Blakeley	(United Kingdom) Lucas Blakeley	(United Kingdom) KMR Sport
7	R21	Brands Hatch (Grand Prix Circuit, Kent)	29 September		(United Kingdom) Finn Harrison	(United Kingdom) Finn Harrison	(United Kingdom) Elite Motorsport

== Championship standings ==
Scoring system

Points were awarded to the top 20 classified finishers in races one and two, with the third race awarding points to only the top 15. Race three, which had its grid formed by reversing the qualifying order, awarded extra points for positions gained from the drivers' respective starting positions.

Races	Position, points per race																			
Races	1st	2nd	3rd	4th	5th	6th	7th	8th	9th	10th	11th	12th	13th	14th	15th	16th	17th	18th	19th	20th
Races 1 & 2	35	29	24	21	19	17	15	13	12	11	10	9	8	7	6	5	4	3	2	1
Race 3	20	17	15	13	11	10	9	8	7	6	5	4	3	2	1					

=== Drivers' championship ===
Pos	Driver	OUL			SIL1			DON1			SNE			SIL2			DON2			BRH			Pts
Pos	Driver	R1	R2	R3	R4	R5	R6	R7	R8	R9	R10	R11	R12	R13	R14	R15	R16	R17	R18	R19	R20	R21	Pts
1	(Sweden) Linus Granfors	7	4	1^{8}	1	1	C	**1**	**4**	9^{6}	4	4	Ret	**1**	**2**	8^{4}	4	1	6^{4}	**3**	**2**	3^{8}	467
2	(United Kingdom) Alisha Palmowski	1	5	Ret	2	4	C	Ret	9	3^{6}	**2**	**1**	1^{11}	3	5	7^{6}	3	4	3^{6}	4	3	2^{4}	422
3	(United Kingdom) Harry Burgoyne Jr.	2	2	3^{9}	5	5	C	5	3	7^{4}	3	2	4^{6}	4	3	6^{3}	15	5	1^{3}	1	4	7^{2}	421
4	(United Kingdom) Branden Templeton	5	3	5^{3}	8	6	C	10	13	1^{4}	6	7	3^{3}	6	6	3^{3}	7	10	7	5	7	4^{3}	317
5	(United Kingdom) Lucas Blakeley										1	3	5^{6}	2	1	4^{7}	1	3	2^{6}	2	1	Ret	306
6	(United Kingdom) Finn Harrison	Ret	Ret	Ret	**4**	**2**	C	7	DSQ	11	5	5	7	9	4	1^{2}	**2**	**2**	13	6	6	1^{4}	291
7	(Canada) Callum Baxter	4	10	4^{6}	9	9	C	8	5	2^{6}	7	11	2^{6}	5	11	Ret	5	6	10	9	8	5	285
8	(United Kingdom) Chloe Grant	8	13	2^{4}	7	Ret	C	6	6	Ret	Ret	8	Ret	10	10	5^{3}	10	9	5	8	10	6	208
9	(Australia) Jack Taylor	10	12	8	10	12	C	14	7	5	9	9	Ret	8	7	2^{2}	9	11	12^{1}	10	9	Ret	202
10	(United Kingdom) Leon Wilson	6	11	6^{1}	11	3	C	9	Ret	13	DSQ	6	Ret	7	Ret	Ret	6	7	9^{2}	7	5	8	202
11	(United Kingdom) Megan Bruce	11	9	7	14	11	C	11	10	14	10	12	6	12	8	9	11	8	14	12	12	9^{3}	183
12	(United Kingdom) Dan Hickey	13	6	10	16	14	C	12	12	10	8	10	Ret	11	12	10	13	12	4	11	11	10	172
13	(Republic of Ireland) Brandon McCaughan	**3**	**1**	Ret	6	8	C	2	1	6^{8}													171
14	(United Kingdom) Marcus Luzio	12	8	9	3	10	C	4	8	12													102
15	(Canada) Mayer Deonarine	9	7	Ret	13	7	C	13	11	4				WD	WD	WD							81
16	(United Kingdom) Liam McNeilly							3	2	8^{5}													66
17	(United States) Ava Dobson													13	9	11	14	14	15				40
18	(Isle of Man) Nick Ellis																8	13	8				29
19	(Poland) Aleksander Mizera																12	15	11^{3}				23
20	(United Kingdom) Christian Lester				12	13	C																17
21	(Netherlands) Bas Visser				15	15	C																12
Pos	Driver	R1	R2	R3	R4	R5	R6	R7	R8	R9	R10	R11	R12	R13	R14	R15	R16	R17	R18	R19	R20	R21	Pts
Pos	Driver	OUL			SIL1			DON1			SNE			SIL2			DON2			BRH			Pts

Colour	Result
Gold	Winner
Silver	Second place
Bronze	Third place
Green	Points classification
Blue	Non-points classification
Blue	Non-classified finish (NC)
Purple	Retired, not classified (Ret)
Red	Did not qualify (DNQ)
Red	Did not pre-qualify (DNPQ)
Black	Disqualified (DSQ)
White	Did not start (DNS)
White	Withdrew (WD)
White	Race cancelled (C)
Blank	Did not practice (DNP)
Blank	Did not arrive (DNA)
Blank	Excluded (EX)

**Bold** – Pole

Italics – Fastest Lap

=== Teams' championship ===
Pos.	Team	Points
1	(United Kingdom) KMR Sport	935
2	(United Kingdom) Elite Motorsport	718
3	(United Kingdom) Fortec Motorsport	694
4	(United Kingdom) Fox Motorsport	546
5	(United Kingdom) Graham Brunton Racing	366
6	(United Kingdom) Arden Motorsport	202
7	(United Kingdom) Luzio.com	102
8	(United States) VRD Racing	40
9	(United Kingdom) Idola Motorsport	23
10	(United Kingdom) Rossoverde Racing	17
