= 2025 Ligier European Series =

Motor racing championship held in 2025

The 2025 Ligier European Series is the sixth season of the Ligier European Series. The six–event season began at Circuit de Barcelona–Catalunya on 4 April, and finished at Algarve International Circuit on 17 October.

== Calendar ==
Round	Race	Circuit	Date	Map of circuit locations
1	Barcelona Heat	(Spain) Circuit de Barcelona–Catalunya	4–5 April	2025 Ligier European Series is located in Europe
2	Le Castellet Heat	(France) Circuit Paul Ricard	2–3 May	2025 Ligier European Series is located in Europe
3	Le Mans Heat	(France) Circuit de la Sarthe	8 June	2025 Ligier European Series is located in Europe
4	Spa–Francorchamps Heat	(Belgium) Circuit de Spa–Francorchamps	22–23 August	2025 Ligier European Series is located in Europe
5	Silverstone Heat	(United Kingdom) Silverstone Circuit	12–13 September	2025 Ligier European Series is located in Europe
6	Portimao Heat	(Portugal) Algarve International Circuit	16–17 October	2025 Ligier European Series is located in Europe

== Entries ==
=== Teams and drivers ===
Team	No.	Drivers	Rounds
JS P4
(Poland) Team Virage	1	(Switzerland) Dario Cabanelas	1–5
(Poland) Team Virage	1	(France) Laura Villars	1–3
(Poland) Team Virage	1	(Republic of Ireland) Brandon McCaughan	5 (Note: Despite not appearing on the entry list for round 5, McCaughan and Robinson replaced Cabanelas for the Silverstone round.)
(Poland) Team Virage	1	(Algeria) Leo Robinson	5
(Poland) Team Virage	1	(Italy) Sebastien Kawpeng (Note: Kawpeng is a Filipino driver racing under an Italian licence.)	6
(Poland) Team Virage	1	(Colombia) Lucas Medina	6
(Poland) Team Virage	27	(United Kingdom) Jude Peters	All
(Poland) Team Virage	27	(Belgium) Vic Stevens	All
(Poland) Team Virage	88	(United Arab Emirates) Amna Al Qubaisi	All
(Poland) Team Virage	88	(United Arab Emirates) Hamda Al Qubaisi	All
(Italy) LR Motorsport	3	(United States) Michael Bulzacchelli	All
(Italy) LR Motorsport	3	(Italy) Pietro Ferri	All
(Italy) LR Motorsport	81	(Italy) Alvise Rodella	3
(United Kingdom) Nielsen Racing	4	(United Kingdom) Ben Caisley	1–3
(United Kingdom) Nielsen Racing	4	(United Kingdom) Josh Steed	1–3
(France) ANS Motorsport	6	(United Kingdom) Maxwell Dodds	All
(France) ANS Motorsport	6	(France) Iko Segret	All
(Spain) ASM Motorsport	12	(United Kingdom) Ruben Hage	All
(Spain) ASM Motorsport	12	(Mexico) Luis Carlos Perez Cabello	All
(Spain) ASM Motorsport	44	(Portugal) André Vieira	All
(France) Pegasus Racing	16	(France) David Caussanel	All
(France) Pegasus Racing	16	(Japan) Yuki Tanaka	All
(France) Pegasus Racing	16	(Japan) Takeshi Kimura	2 (Note: Despite not appearing on the entry list, Kimura replaced Tanaka for the Paul Ricard round.)
(France) Pegasus Racing	29	(France) Julien Schell	All
(France) Pegasus Racing	29	(Argentina) Nazareno Lopez	1
(France) Pegasus Racing	29	(Japan) Takeshi Kimura	3
(France) Pegasus Racing	29	(France) Christophe Weber	4
(France) Trajectus Motorsport	19	(France) Vincent Bouteiller	All
(France) Trajectus Motorsport	19	(France) Mathis Poulet	All
(France) Loire Valley Racing	22	(France) Romain Boeckler	All
(United Kingdom) 360 Competition	33	(United Kingdom) Kristian Brookes	1–2, 4–5
(United Kingdom) 360 Competition	33	(United Kingdom) Christopher Preen	1–2, 4–5
(United Kingdom) P4 Racing	46	(United Kingdom) Andrew Ferguson	3
(Italy) HP Racing by MRacing	58	(France) Jacques Nicolet	All
(Italy) Iron Lynx by MRacing	60	(Italy) Gregorio Bertocco	All
(Italy) Iron Lynx by MRacing	60	(Italy) Matteo Pianezzola	1–4
(Italy) Iron Lynx by MRacing	60	(France) Natan Bihel	5
(Italy) Iron Lynx by MRacing	60	(Italy) Simone Vullo Jody	6
JS2 R
(Italy) LR Motorsport	7	(Italy) Simone Riccitelli	All
(Italy) Not Only Motor Sport	14	(Italy) Filippo Tornaghi	6
(Italy) Not Only Motor Sport	14	(Italy) Giacomo Pollini	6
(Spain) Chefo Sport (Spain) Petrogold	17	(Portugal) Henrique Cruz	All
(Spain) Chefo Sport (Spain) Petrogold	17	(Spain) Miguel Angel Romero	1–4
(Spain) Chefo Sport (Spain) Petrogold	17	(Spain) Jose Antonio Gomez Gutierrez	5
(Spain) Chefo Sport (Spain) Petrogold	17	(Spain) Sebastian Villadary	6
(France) VSF Sports	18	(France) Lukas Papin	All
(France) VSF Sports	18	(France) Enzo Caldaras	1–3
(France) VSF Sports	18	(France) Steven Palette	4–6
(France) VSF Sports	41	(France) Tristan Clay	All
(France) VSF Sports	41	(France) Florian Tiellais	All
(France) Les Deux Arbres	26	(France) Pierre Olivier Calendini	3
(France) Les Deux Arbres	26	(France) Gil Maillet	3
(France) Les Deux Arbres	50	(France) Noé Da Cunha	All
(France) Les Deux Arbres	50	(France) Antoine Lepesqueux	1–4
(France) Les Deux Arbres	50	(France) Jeremy Loisel	6
(France) Pegasus Racing	28	(France) Christophe Weber	3
(France) Pegasus Racing	55	(Japan) Yusuke Yamasaki	3
(France) Pegasus Racing	94	(France) Alain Meyer	All
(France) Pegasus Racing	94	(France) Jordan Meyer	All
(France) ANS Motorsport	37	(France) Paul Alberto	3
(France) ANS Motorsport	37	(France) Viny Beltramelli	3
(France) ANS Motorsport	71	(France) Ludovic Revol	3
(France) 23Events Racing	57	(Denmark) August Therbo	All
(France) MRacing	68	(France) Cindy Gudet	All
(France) Zosh Competition	72	(France) Anthony Perrin	3
(France) Zosh Competition	72	(France) Léo Pinquier	3
(France) Loire Valley Racing	74	(Andorra) Karl Jean Pedraza	1–2
(France) Loire Valley Racing	74	(France) Ethan Pharamond	3
(France) Loire Valley Racing	74	(France) Pascal Huteau	3
(France) Trajectus Motorsport	83	(France) Martin Lacquemanne	All
(France) Trajectus Motorsport	84	(France) Nicolas Markiewicz	1–2
(France) Trajectus Motorsport	84	(France) Adrien Paviot	1–2
(France) Trajectus Motorsport	84	(France) Martin Tabery	3–4
(France) Trajectus Motorsport	84	(France) Jules Treluyer	6
(France) Trajectus Motorsport	84	(United Kingdom) Nickolas Ellis	6
Entrylists:

== Results ==
Round		Circuit	JS P4 Winners	JS2 R Winners
1	R1	(Spain) Circuit de Barcelona–Catalunya	(France) No. 6 ANS Motorsport	(France) No. 18 VSF Sports
1	R1	(Spain) Circuit de Barcelona–Catalunya	(United Kingdom) Maxwell Dodds (France) Iko Segret	(France) Enzo Caldaras (France) Lukas Papin
1	R2	(Spain) Circuit de Barcelona–Catalunya	(France) No. 22 Loire Valley Racing	(France) No. 57 23Events Racing
1	R2	(Spain) Circuit de Barcelona–Catalunya	(France) Romain Boeckler	(Denmark) August Therbo
2	R1	(France) Circuit Paul Ricard	(France) No. 6 ANS Motorsport	(Italy) No. 7 LR Motorsport
2	R1	(France) Circuit Paul Ricard	(United Kingdom) Maxwell Dodds (France) Iko Segret	(Italy) Simone Riccitelli
2	R2	(France) Circuit Paul Ricard	(France) No. 22 Loire Valley Racing	(Italy) No. 7 LR Motorsport
2	R2	(France) Circuit Paul Ricard	(France) Romain Boeckler	(Italy) Simone Riccitelli
3	R	(France) Circuit de la Sarthe	(France) No. 22 Loire Valley Racing	(Italy) No. 7 LR Motorsport
3	R	(France) Circuit de la Sarthe	(France) Romain Boeckler	(Italy) Simone Riccitelli
4	R1	(Belgium) Circuit de Spa–Francorchamps	(France) No. 22 Loire Valley Racing	(France) No. 18 VSF Sports
4	R1	(Belgium) Circuit de Spa–Francorchamps	(France) Romain Boeckler	(France) Lukas Papin (France) Steven Palette
4	R2	(Belgium) Circuit de Spa–Francorchamps	(Poland) No. 27 Team Virage	(France) No. 57 23Events Racing
4	R2	(Belgium) Circuit de Spa–Francorchamps	(United Kingdom) Jude Peters (Belgium) Vic Stevens	(Denmark) August Therbo
5	R1	(United Kingdom) Silverstone Circuit	(Poland) No. 1 Team Virage	(Italy) No. 7 LR Motorsport
5	R1	(United Kingdom) Silverstone Circuit	(Republic of Ireland) Brandon McCaughan (Algeria) Leo Robinson	(Italy) Simone Riccitelli
5	R2	(United Kingdom) Silverstone Circuit	(Poland) No. 1 Team Virage	(Italy) No. 7 LR Motorsport
5	R2	(United Kingdom) Silverstone Circuit	(Republic of Ireland) Brandon McCaughan (Algeria) Leo Robinson	(Italy) Simone Riccitelli
6	R1	(Portugal) Algarve International Circuit	(France) No. 22 Loire Valley Racing	(France) No. 18 VSF Sports
6	R1	(Portugal) Algarve International Circuit	(France) Romain Boeckler	(France) Lukas Papin (France) Steven Palette
6	R2	(Portugal) Algarve International Circuit	(France) No. 6 ANS Motorsport	(France) No. 18 VSF Sports
6	R2	(Portugal) Algarve International Circuit	(United Kingdom) Maxwell Dodds (France) Iko Segret	(France) Lukas Papin (France) Steven Palette

== Championship standings ==
=== JS P4 Drivers ===
Pos.	Driver	Team	BAR (Spain)		LEC (France)		LMS (France)	SPA (Belgium)		SIL (United Kingdom)		ALG (Portugal)		Points
1	(United Kingdom) Maxwell Dodds (France) Iko Segret	(France) ANS Motorsport	1	2	1	2	2	Ret	11	3	5	2	1	172
2	(France) Romain Boeckler	(France) Loire Valley Racing	12	1	Ret	1	1	1	6	2	4	1	Ret	163
3	(United Kingdom) Jude Peters (Belgium) Vic Stevens	(Poland) Team Virage	Ret	5	3	3	3	10	1	7	Ret	5	2	115
4	(United Arab Emirates) Amna Al Qubaisi (United Arab Emirates) Hamda Al Qubaisi	(Poland) Team Virage	7	3	4	4	6	3	4	11	2	Ret	7	104
5	(France) Vincent Bouteiller (France) Mathis Poulet	(France) Trajectus Motorsport	11	Ret	5	5	4	2	Ret	6	7	7	6	78
6	(Mexico) Luis Carlos Perez Cabello (United Kingdom) Ruben Hage	(Spain) ASM Motorsport	3	10	6	11	11	4	8	5	Ret	4	4	75
7	(United States) Michael Bulzacchelli (Italy) Pietro Ferri	(Italy) LR Motorsport	9	6	10	6	Ret	11	2	9	9	3	5	66
8	(Italy) Gregorio Bertocco	(Italy) Iron Lynx by MRacing	2	4	Ret	9	9	Ret	Ret	4	Ret	9	8	54
9	(Republic of Ireland) Brandon McCaughan (Algeria) Leo Robinson	(Poland) Team Virage								1	1			50
10	(Portugal) André Vieira	(Spain) ASM Motorsport	4	7	9	8	Ret	Ret	3	10	10	8	Ret	45
11	(United Kingdom) Ben Caisley (United Kingdom) Josh Steed	(United Kingdom) Nielsen Racing	5	14	2	7	5							44
12	(Italy) Matteo Pianezzola	(Italy) Iron Lynx by MRacing	2	4	Ret	9	9	Ret	Ret					36
13	(United Kingdom) Kristian Brookes (United Kingdom) Christopher Preen	(United Kingdom) 360 Competition	6	9	8	14		7	Ret	12	3			35
14	(France) Julien Schell	(France) Pegasus Racing	8	8	7	10	13	9	10	8	6	Ret	DNS	30
15	(Italy) Sebastien Kawpeng (Colombia) Lucas Medina	(Poland) Team Virage										6	3	23
16	(France) David Caussanel	(France) Pegasus Racing	14	11	12	13	7	6	7	Ret	11	10	9	23
17	(Switzerland) Dario Cabanelas	(Poland) Team Virage	13	13	13	12	10	5	5					22
18	(Japan) Yuki Tanaka	(France) Pegasus Racing	14	11	WD	WD		6	7	Ret	11	10	9	17
19	(France) Natan Bihel	(Italy) Iron Lynx by MRacing								4	Ret			12
20	(France) Jacques Nicolet	(Italy) HP Racing by MRacing	10	12	11	15	12	8	9	13	8	11	10	12
21	(France) Christophe Weber	(France) Pegasus Racing						9	10					3
22	(Italy) Simone Vullo Jody	(Italy) Iron Lynx by MRacing										9	WD	2
23	(France) Laura Villars	(Poland) Team Virage	13	13	13	12	10							2
24	(Japan) Takeshi Kimura	(France) Pegasus Racing			12	13	13							0
–	(Argentina) Nazareno Lopez	(France) Pegasus Racing	WD	WD										–
Guest drivers ineligible to score points
–	(Italy) Alvise Rodella	(Italy) LR Motorsport					8							–
–	(United Kingdom) Andrew Ferguson	(United Kingdom) P4 Racing					14							–
Pos.	Driver	Team	BAR (Spain)		LEC (France)		LMS (France)	SPA (Belgium)		SIL (United Kingdom)		ALG (Portugal)		Points

=== JS2 R Drivers ===
Pos.	Driver	Team	BAR (Spain)		LEC (France)		LMS (France)	SPA (Belgium)		SIL (United Kingdom)		ALG (Portugal)		Points
1	(Italy) Simone Riccitelli	(Italy) LR Motorsport	3	Ret	1	1	1	2	3	1	1	Ret	2	191
2	(France) Lukas Papin	(France) VSF Sports	1	2	10	3	Ret	1	2	2	2	1	1	188
3	(Denmark) August Therbo	(France) 23Events Racing	5	1	2	2	2	3	1	3	3	10	7	169
4	(France) Steven Palette	(France) VSF Sports						1	2	2	2	1	1	129
5	(France) Martin Lacquemanne	(France) Trajectus Motorsport	6	5	3	5	4	5	Ret	4	5	5	5	111
6	(France) Cindy Gudet	(France) MRacing	4	4	7	8	5	4	4	5	8	4	6	107
7	(France) Tristan Clay (France) Florian Tiellais	(France) VSF Sports	2	3	4	6	Ret	7	6	Ret	6	6	10	87
8	(France) Noé Da Cunha	(France) Les Deux Arbres	8	6	Ret	4	3	Ret	5	7	4	8	8	79
9	(France) Enzo Caldaras	(France) VSF Sports	1	2	10	3	Ret							59
10	(France) Alain Meyer (France) Jordan Meyer	(France) Pegasus Racing	7	7	9	10	10	8	8	8	7	9	9	43
11	(France) Antoine Lepesqueux	(France) Les Deux Arbres	8	6	Ret	4	3							39
12	(United Kingdom) Nickolas Ellis (France) Jules Treluyer	(France) Trajectus Motorsport										3	4	33
13	(Portugal) Henrique Cruz	(Spain) Chefo Sport	Ret	Ret	6	9	7	Ret	Ret	6	Ret	7	Ret	32
14	(France) Martin Tabery	(France) Trajectus Motorsport					9	6	7					18
15	(France) Nicolas Markiewicz (France) Adrien Paviot	(France) Trajectus Motorsport	Ret	DNS	5	7								16
16	(Spain) Miguel Angel Romero	(Spain) Chefo Sport	Ret	Ret	6	9	7	Ret	Ret					16
17	(France) Jeremy Loisel	(France) Les Deux Arbres										8	8	12
18	(Spain) Jose Antonio Gomez Gutierrez	(Spain) Chefo Sport								6	Ret			8
19	(France) Ethan Pharamond (France) Pascal Huteau	(France) Loire Valley Racing					6							8
20	(Spain) Sebastian Villadary	(Spain) Chefo Sport										7	Ret	8
21	(Andorra) Karl Jean Pedraza	(France) Loire Valley Racing	Ret	8	8	11								8
Guest drivers ineligible to score points
–	(Italy) Filippo Tornaghi (Italy) Giacomo Pollini	(Italy) Not Only Motor Sport										2	3	–
–	(Japan) Yusuke Yamasaki	(France) Pegasus Racing					8							–
–	(France) Christophe Weber	(France) Pegasus Racing					11							–
–	(France) Ludovic Revol	(France) ANS Motorsport					12							–
–	(France) Anthony Perrin (France) Léo Pinquier	(France) Zosh Competition					13							–
–	(France) Pierre Olivier Calendini (France) Gil Maillet	(France) Les Deux Arbres					14							–
–	(France) Paul Alberto (France) Viny Beltramelli	(France) ANS Motorsport					Ret							–
Pos.	Driver	Team	BAR (Spain)		LEC (France)		LMS (France)	SPA (Belgium)		SIL (United Kingdom)		ALG (Portugal)		Points
