= Finn Harrison =

British racing driver (born 2006)

- Nationality: (United Kingdom) British
- Born: 11 July 2006 (age 20) Lancashire, England

1pMobile National Junior Sportbike career
- Current team: Rokit Rookies
- Starts: 4 (4 entries)
- Wins: 0
- Podiums: 0
- Poles: 0

Previous series
- 2023–2024; 2024; 2022–2023: GB4 Championship; Formula Winter Series; Ginetta Junior Championship

Finn Harrison (born 11 July 2006) is a British motorcycle racer and former racing driver who competes in the 1pMobile National Junior Sportbike for Rokit Rookies. In single-seater racing, Harrison was a race winner in the 2024 GB4 Championship for Elite Motorsport. He previously competed in the Formula Winter Series and the Ginetta Junior Championship.

== Career ==
=== Ginetta Junior Championship ===
==== 2022 ====
In 2022, Harrison competed in the Ginetta Junior Championship with Assetto Motorsport for the final two rounds at Silverstone and Brands Hatch.

==== 2023 ====
Harrison returned to the series for 2023, initially with Assetto Motorsport again, although he switched to Elite Motorsport mid-season. He took four podiums and finished the eighth in the standings despite missing the final round at Donington Park.

=== GB4 Championship ===
==== 2023 ====
For the 2023 GB4 Championship, Harrison joined Elite Motorsport for the final round at Donington Park. He qualified sixth and fifth for races 1 and 2, respectively. He retired from the first race following a collision with Jack Clifford, but finished fourth in race 2, ending the weekend on 29 points.

==== 2024 ====
Following his debut at the end of the previous series, Harrison joined forces with Elite Motorsport again for the 2024 GB4 Championship. The season started slowly, with retirements from all three races in Oulton Park. He bounced back at the first Silverstone round to take double pole positions, and converted pole to his first GB4 podium in race two. His first win in single-seaters came in the second Silverstone round, where he won the reverse-grid race three. Another successful weekend came in the second visit to Donington Park, where a pair of pole positions were converted to two more podiums. With one more win in the final race of the season, he finished sixth in the standings.

=== Formula Winter Series ===
==== 2024 ====
In preparation for the upcoming GB4 Championship, Harrison drove for Campos Racing in the 2024 Formula Winter Series. He would finish 30th in the standings, scoring one sole point during the first round at Jerez.

=== GB3 Championship ===
Harrison was expected to graduate to the 2025 GB3 Championship with Elite Motorsport, having tested with the team in November 2024. However, his appearances in pre-season testing were with Chris Dittmann Racing at Snetterton and Hillspeed in Silverstone. He was not on the entry list for the start of the season.

=== 1p Mobile Junior Sportbike Championship ===
==== 2026 ====
Ahead of the 2026 season, Harrison was announced as a rider for the ROKiT Rookies team in the 1pMobile National Junior Sportbike Championship, having tested with the squad on multiple occasions at Donington Park during the latter stages of the 2025 season. Harrison made his championship debut at the opening round of the season at Oulton Park.

== Racing record ==
=== Racing career summary ===
Season	Series	Team	Races	Wins	Poles	F/Laps	Podiums	Points	Position
2022	Ginetta Junior Championship	Assetto Motorsport	6	0	0	0	0	6	29th
2023	Ginetta Junior Championship	Assetto Motorsport	22	0	0	0	5	334	8th
2023	GB4 Championship	Elite Motorsport	3	0	0	0	0	29	21st
2024	Formula Winter Series	Campos Racing	11	0	0	0	0	1	30th
2024	GB4 Championship	Elite Motorsport	20	2	4	1	5	291	6th

^{*} Season still in progress.

=== Complete Ginetta Junior Championship results ===
(key) (Races in bold indicate pole position) (Races in italics indicate fastest lap)

Year	Team	1	2	3	4	5	6	7	8	9	10	11	12	13	14	15	16	17	18	19	20	21	22	23	24	25	26	27	DC	Points
2022	Assetto Motorsport	DON; 1	DON; 2	DON; 3	BHI; 1	BHI; 2	BHI; 3	THR1; 1	THR1; 2	CRO; 1	CRO; 2	KNO; 1	KNO; 2	KNO; 3	SNE; 1	SNE; 2	SNE; 3	THR2; 1	THR2; 2	THR2; 3	SIL; 1; 23	SIL; 2; 17	SIL; 3; 21	BHGP; 1 Ret	BHGP; 2; 20	BHGP; 3; 14			29th	6
2023	Assetto Motorsport	OUL; 1; 7	OUL; 2; 4	OUL; 3; 3	SIL1; 1 Ret	SIL1; 2; 8	SIL1; 3; 12	DON1; 1; 6	DON1; 2 Ret	DON1; 3 DNS	SIL2; 1; 2	SIL2; 2; 8	SIL2; 3; 9	SIL2; 4; 4	SIL2; 5; 3	SIL2; 6; 5	SNE; 1; 9	SNE; 2; 3	SNE; 3 DNS	CAD; 1; 11	CAD; 2; 2	CAD; 3; 6	BRH; 1; 10	BRH; 2; 10	BRH; 3; 8	DON2; 1	DON2; 2	DON2; 3	8th	334

=== Complete GB4 Championship results ===
(key) (Races in bold indicate pole position) (Races in italics indicate fastest lap)

Year	Team	1	2	3	4	5	6	7	8	9	10	11	12	13	14	15	16	17	18	19	20	21	22	DC	Points
2023	Elite Motorsport	OUL; 1	OUL; 2	OUL; 3	SIL1; 1	SIL1; 2	SIL1; 3	DON1; 1	DON1; 2	DON1; 3	DON1; 4	SNE; 1	SNE; 2	SNE; 3	SIL2; 1	SIL2; 2	SIL2; 3	BRH; 1	BRH; 2	BRH; 3	DON2; 1 Ret	DON2; 2; 4	DON2; 3; 8	21st	29
2024	Elite Motorsport	OUL; 1 Ret	OUL; 2 Ret	OUL; 3 Ret	**SIL1**; **1**; 4	**SIL1**; **2**; 2	SIL1; 3 C	DON1; 1; 7	DON1; 2 DSQ	DON1; 3; 11	SNE; 1; 5	SNE; 2; 5	SNE; 3; 7	SIL2; 1; 9	SIL2; 2; 4	SIL2; 3; 1^{2}	**DON2**; **1**; 2	**DON2**; **2**; 2	DON2; 3; 13	BRH; 1; 6	BRH; 2; 6	BRH; 3; 1^{4}		6th	291

=== Complete Formula Winter Series results ===
(key) (Races in bold indicate pole position; races in italics indicate fastest lap)

Year	Team	1	2	3	4	5	6	7	8	9	10	11	12	DC	Points
2024	Campos Racing	JER; 1; 26	JER; 2; 10	JER; 3; 22	CRT; 1; 21	CRT; 2 Ret	CRT; 3; 21	ARA; 1; 19	ARA; 2; 22	ARA; 3; 21	CAT; 1 C	CAT; 2; 31	CAT; 3; 16	30th	1
