= Laura Villars =

Swiss racing driver (born 1997)

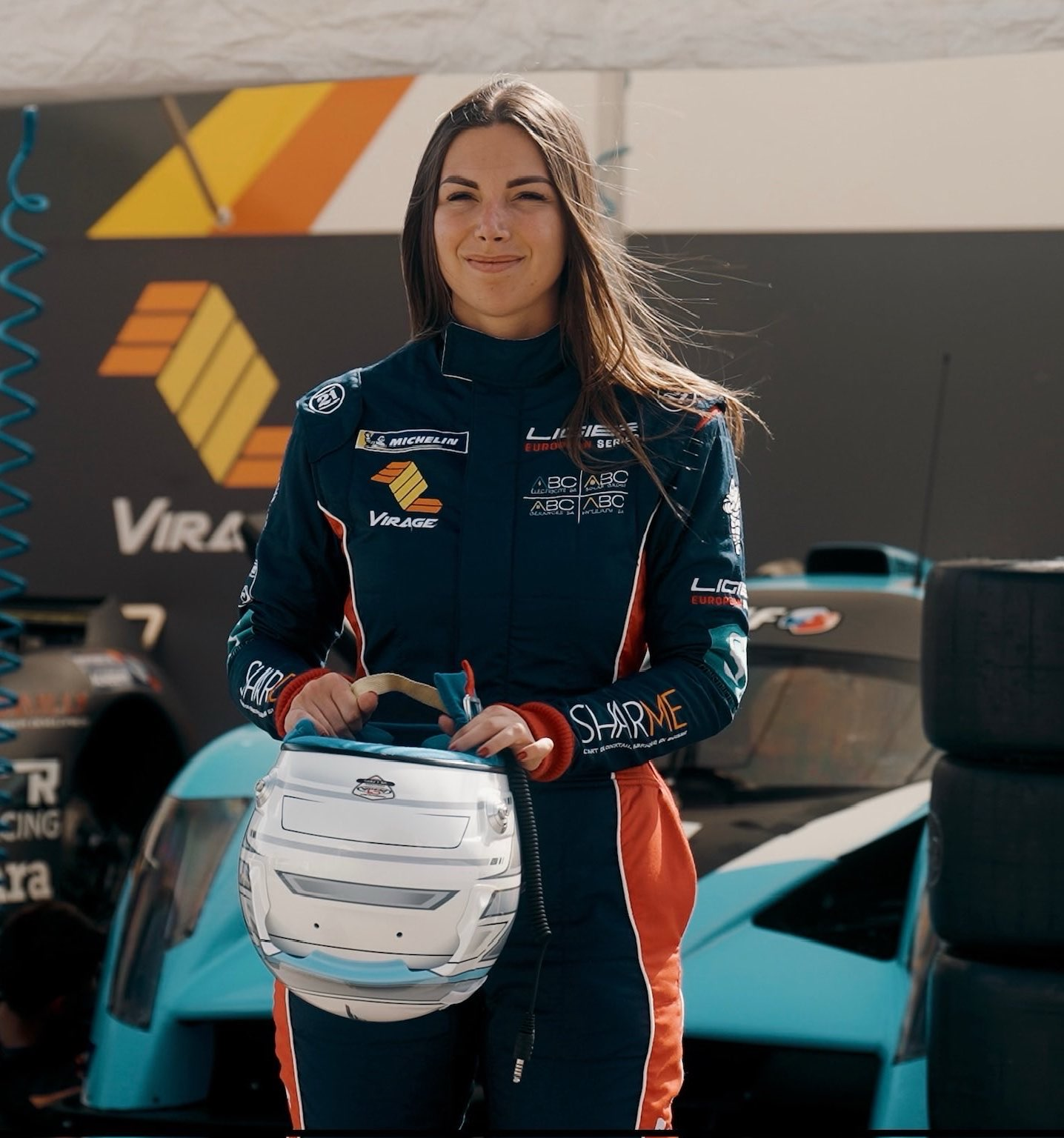
- Villars in 2025
- Nationality: (Switzerland) Swiss (France) French
- Born: 29 August 1997 (age 29) Geneva, Switzerland
- Categorisation: FIA Silver

Laura Villars (born 29 August 1997) is a Swiss and French racing driver, who last competed in the Ligier European Series for Team Virage.

Villars started her professional racing career in 2023, at age 25, in the Ultimate Cup Series, before moving to F4 Saudi Arabia and the Ferrari Challenge Europe in 2024. She then transitioned over to the JS P4 class of the Ligier European Series the following year, partaking in the first three rounds,

Villars announced her intention to run for president of the Fédération Internationale de l'Automobile (FIA) in September 2025.

== Early life and education ==
Born in Geneva, Switzerland, Villars discovered her passion for motorsport at the age of 14. However, she opted to focus on her studies, graduating from CREA - OMNES Education with a bachelor's degree in business management in 2021, before founding the LSVM group and also taking over the management of Starimmobilier SA the same year.

== Career ==
In 2023, Villars made her single-seater debut in the Ultimate Cup Series Challenge Monoplace for Formula Motorsport. Racing in all but two rounds, Villars took a best result of fourth at Magny-Cours, which helped her finish fifth in the overall standings. At the end of the year, Villars raced in the Formula 4 UAE Trophy Round at Yas Marina for Xcel Motorsport. In the two races supporting the Abu Dhabi Grand Prix, Villars retired in Race 1 before finishing 13th in Race 2.

Following that, Villars continued in the single-seater route, as she joined the Meritus.GP-centrally run F4 Saudi Arabian championship. In the series' only season, Villars partook in three rounds, scoring a best result of fifth at Jeddah, as she ended the winter 13th in points. For the rest of the year, Villars joined Zenith Scuderia to compete in Pro-Am class of 2024 Ferrari Challenge Europe. Partaking in all but two rounds, Villars took a best result of eighth at Jerez and ended the year 20th in the Pro-Am standings, whilst dominating the Ladies' trophy as the sole entrant.

The following year, in 2025, Villars switched to the JS P4 class of the Ligier European Series. Driving alongside Dario Cabanelas through the first three rounds, the pair took a best result of 10th at Le Mans, before Villars left the series ahead of the round at Spa in August 2025.

== Media and other activities ==
In 2023, Villars was the subject of a broadcast by Swiss Radio and Television in the program Couleurs Locales, which tells the story of her career in a predominantly male sport.

In 2025, Villars launched a YouTube channel dedicated to her racing career. She shares behind-the-scenes content from racing events, tests cars and boats, and occasionally invites celebrities for challenges or driving experiences.

Beyond racing competitively, Villars actively advocates for the advancement of women in motorsport. She uses her fame to inspire other women to break down barriers in a traditionally male-dominated environment. She is also involved in partnerships with initiatives promoting gender equality.

== Candidacy for FIA Presidency ==
In September 2025, Villars announced her intention to run for president of the FIA against incumbent Mohammed Ben Sulayem in the upcoming election on 12 December 2025. Tim Mayer, the other candidate, withdrew his candidacy in October 2025, citing issues with the FIA electoral process. Technicalities in the election process required each candidate to list one potential vice president from each of the FIA global regions. Fabiana Ecclestone, wife of Bernie Ecclestone (former CEO of Formula One Group), was the only candidate in the South American region, and she supported Ben Sulayem. This meant Villars and all other candidates were blocked from running in the election.

Villars is taking legal action against the electoral rules currently enforced by the FIA, stating that she wants to make sure the process is able to “respect the highest standards of governance, transparency, and democracy”. Villars' legal team argued for the suspension of the FIA election during an emergency meeting in a Paris court on 3 December 2025, but the election will proceed as scheduled and Ben Sulayem will run unopposed. However, an initial court hearing is set for 16 February 2026 to dispute "the irregularities raised regarding the presidential election".

== Racing record ==
=== Racing career summary ===
Season	Series	Team	Races	Wins	Poles	F/Laps	Podiums	Points	Position
2023	Ultimate Cup Series Challenge Monoplace - F3R	Formula Motorsport	11	0	0	0	0	203	5th
2023	Formula 4 UAE Championship - Trophy Round	Xcel Motorsport	2	0	0	0	0	—N/a	8th
2024	F4 Saudi Arabian Championship - Trophy Event	Altawkilat Meritus.GP	4	0	0	0	0	N/A	NC
2024	F4 Saudi Arabian Championship	Altawkilat Meritus.GP	11	0	0	0	0	13	15th
2024	Ferrari Challenge Europe - Pro-Am	Zenith Scuderia	10	0	0	0	0	6	20th
2025	Ligier European Series - JS P4	Team Virage	5	0	0	1	0	2	23rd
2026	Italian GT Championship Sprint Cup - GT Cup	MRNC12							
