= 2024 Ferrari Challenge Europe =

The 2024 Ferrari Challenge Europe was the 32nd season of Ferrari Challenge Europe. The season consisted of 7 rounds, starting at Mugello on 2 May 2024 and ending at Imola during the Ferrari World Finals on 20 October 2024.

This season marked the debut of the Ferrari 296 Challenge that would replace the Ferrari 488 Challenge Evo.

== Calendar ==
The season consisted of 14 races run at seven different circuits in Europe.

Rnd.	Circuit	Dates
1	Autodromo Internazionale del Mugello, Scarperia e San Piero, Italy	2–5 May
2	Balaton Park Circuit, Balatonfőkajár, Hungary	30 May–2 June
3	Circuito de Jerez, Jerez de la Frontera, Spain	20–23 June
4	Algarve International Circuit, Portimão, Portugal	4–7 July
5	Circuit Paul Ricard, Le Castellet, France	25–28 July
6	Nürburgring, Nürburg, Germany	5–8 September
7	Autodromo Internazionale Enzo e Dino Ferrari, Imola, Italy	16–20 October

== Entry list ==
=== Trofeo Pirelli ===
Team	No.	Driver	Class	Rounds
(Germany) Gohm Motorsport - Engstler	1	(Germany) Franz Engstler	Pro	1
(Germany) Gohm Motorsport - Engstler	1	(Germany) Franz Engstler	Pro-Am	6
(Germany) Gohm Motorsport - Engstler	6	(Germany) Luca Engstler	Pro	3
(Germany) Gohm Motorsport - Baron Racing Team	91	(Austria) Philipp Baron	Pro	All
(Switzerland) Emil Frey Racing	2	(Italy) Giacomo Altoè	Pro	2–7
(Switzerland) Emil Frey Racing	14	(Switzerland) Jean-Luc D'Auria	Pro	1
(Switzerland) Emil Frey Racing	85	(Germany) Hanno Laskowski	Pro-Am	All
(Italy) CDP - Eureka Competition	3	(Italy) Max Mugelli	Pro	All
(Italy) CDP - MP Racing	50	(Italy) David Gostner	Pro-Am	7
(Italy) CDP - Pinetti Motorsport	69	(Italy) Marco Zanasi	Pro-Am	All
(United Kingdom) Charles Hurst	4	(United Kingdom) Andrew Morrow	Pro-Am	All
(Switzerland) Zenith Scuderia	5	(Switzerland) Laura Villars	Pro-Am	1–5
(Denmark) Formula Racing	7	(Denmark) Andreas Bøgh-Sørensen	Pro-Am	1, 3–7
(Denmark) Formula Racing	10	(Denmark) Kim Eriksen	Pro-Am	1–2, 4, 7
(Denmark) Formula Racing	29	(Denmark) Anders Bidstrup	Pro-Am	4
(Denmark) Formula Racing	40	(Denmark) Jacob Bidstrup	Pro-Am	4
(Denmark) Formula Racing	89	(Denmark) Claus Zibrandtsen	Pro-Am	All
(Denmark) Formula Racing	99	(Denmark) Andreas Ø. Borris	Pro-Am	4
(Germany) MERTEL Motorsport	8	(Germany) Luca Ludwig	Pro	1, 3–7
(Germany) MERTEL Motorsport	42	(Germany) Matthias Tomann	Pro-Am	1, 5–6
(Germany) MERTEL Motorsport	77	(Spain) Ivan Velasco Sanchez	Pro-Am	6
(Germany) MERTEL Motorsport	81	(Georgia (country)) Davit Kajaia	Pro-Am	7
(Germany) Penske Sportswagen Hamburg	9	(Germany) Danilo Del Favero	Pro-Am	1, 3–7
(Italy) Maranello Motors	11	(Germany) Herbert Geiss	Pro-Am	1–3, 5–7
(Italy) Radicci Automobili	12	(Italy) Giammarco Marzialetti	Pro-Am	1–5, 7
(Italy) Radicci Automobili	13	(Italy) Luigi Coluccio	Pro	4–7
(Italy) Pellin Racing	15	(United States) Dylan Medler	Pro	4–6
(Germany) Autohaus Ulrich	17	(Germany) Timo Glock	Pro	1, 5
(Poland) Ferrari Warszawa	18	(Netherlands) Michael Verhagen	Pro-Am	6–7
(Monaco) Scuderia Monte-Carlo	23	David Akhobadze	Pro-Am	All
(United Kingdom) Meridien Modena - Engstler	26	(United Kingdom) James Owen	Pro-Am	All
(Australia) Ferrari Richmond	33	(Australia) Cameron Campbell	Pro-Am	5
(Germany) Lueg Sportivo - Herter Racing	71	(Germany) Otto Blank	Pro-Am	All
(Germany) Lueg Sportivo - Herter Racing	78	(Germany) Axel Sartingen	Pro-Am	4–7
(Czech Republic) Scuderia Praha Racing	77	(Grenada) Ruslan Sadreev	Pro-Am	1–2
(Czech Republic) Scuderia Praha Racing	92	(Czech Republic) Hendrik Viol	Pro-Am	All
(Italy) Rossocorsa	67	(Italy) Federico Al Rifai	Pro-Am	6
(Italy) Rossocorsa	80	(Venezuela) Angelo Fontana	Pro-Am	1, 3–4, 6–7
(Hungary) Ferrari Budapest - Rossocorsa	86	(Hungary) Bence Válint	Pro	All
(Germany) Riller und Schnauck	88	(Germany) Amin Arefpour	Pro-Am	All

=== Coppa Shell ===
Team	No.	Driver	Class	Rounds
(Switzerland) Kessel Racing	100	(United States) Stephen Earle	S-Am	All
(Switzerland) Kessel Racing	133	(Turkey) Murat Çuhadaroğlu	S	1
(Switzerland) Kessel Racing	167	(France) Henry Hassid	S	All
(Switzerland) Kessel Racing	177	(Netherlands) Fons Scheltema	S	All
(Switzerland) Kessel Racing	186	(Germany) Jan Benedikt Sandmann	S-Am	All
(Switzerland) Kessel Racing	199	(Austria) Ernst Kirchmayr	S	5–7
(Italy) Sa.Mo.Car	101	(Italy) Paolo Scudieri	S-Am	1–5, 7
(Italy) Pellin Racing	102	(United States) Thor Haugen	S	7
(Italy) Pellin Racing	130	(United States) Lisa Clark	S-Am	1, 3–6
(Italy) Pellin Racing	172	(Italy) Giuseppe Ramelli	S-Am	1, 4–5, 7
(Germany) Gohm Motorsport - Haupt Racing Team	104	(Austria) Andreas König	S-Am	All
(Germany) Gohm Motorsport - Haupt Racing Team	136	(Austria) Alexander Nussbaumer	S	All
(Japan) Cornes Motors Shiba	105	(Japan) Motohiko Isozaki	S	All
(United States) The Collection	107	(United States) Rey Acosta	S	1, 3–6
(Italy) Maranello Motors	109	(Germany) Michael Martin	S	1–3, 5–7
(France) Gaudel - XP Racing	110	(France) Max-Hervé George	S-Am	5
(Denmark) Formula Racing	111	(Lebanon) Hassan Dabboussi	S-Am	1–3, 5, 7
(Denmark) Formula Racing	113	(Denmark) Henrik Kamstrup	S-Am	1–3, 5, 7
(Denmark) Formula Racing	121	(Denmark) Peter Christensen	S	5
(Denmark) Formula Racing	170	(Japan) Ken Abe	S	1–3, 6–7
(Denmark) Formula Racing	198	(Canada) Eric Cheung	S-Am	All
(Denmark) Formula Racing	226	(Sweden) Joakim Olander	488	5
(Denmark) Formula Racing	251	(United States) Patrick Byrne	488	6
(Denmark) Formula Racing	269	(Italy) Fabrizio Fontana	488	1–5, 7
(Denmark) Formula Racing	282	(Czech Republic) Martin Havas	488	7
(Denmark) Formula Racing	289	(Denmark) Niels Zibrandtsen	488	2–3, 5–7
(Italy) Ineco	115	(Japan) Shintaro Akatsu	S-Am	All
(Italy) Rossocorsa	118	(United States) James Weiland	S	1, 6–7
(Italy) Rossocorsa	119	(Mexico) Luis Perusquia	S-Am	1–4, 6–7
(Italy) Rossocorsa	144	(Italy) Pierluigi Alessandri	S	1, 3, 5, 7
(Italy) Rossocorsa	171	(Italy) Andrea Levy	S-Am	All
(Italy) Rossocorsa	240	(Italy) Pino Frascaro	488	All
(Belgium) Scuderia FMA	120	(Belgium) Guy Fawe	S-Am	All
(Italy) CDP - D&C Racing	122	(Switzerland) Andreas Ritzi	S	1–4, 6–7
(Italy) CDP - D&C Racing	201	(Switzerland) Qwin Wietlisbach	488	5–7
Scuderia Lebanon	124	(Lebanon) Talal Shair	S-Am	2–7
Scuderia Lebanon	205	(Lebanon) Faysal Shair	488	5–7
(Japan) Cornes Osaka	127	(Japan) Norikazu Shibata	S-Am	7
(Switzerland) Emil Frey Racing	134	(Turkey) Mutlu Tasev	S-Am	All
(Japan) Rosso Scuderia	140	(Japan) Yasutaka Shirasaki	S	7
(Spain) Santogal - Araujo Competicao	150	(Portugal) Álvaro Ramos	S-Am	All
(Italy) CDP - MP Racing	161	(Italy) Thomas Gostner	S	2–7
(Italy) CDP - MP Racing	173	(Italy) Corinna Gostner	S	3–4, 7
(Hungary) Ferrari Budapest - Rossocorsa	132	(Hungary) Tibor Válint	S	All
(Germany) Gohm Motorsport - Engstler	152	(Germany) Thomas Löfflad	S	1, 6
(Germany) Gohm Motorsport - Engstler	159	(Germany) Roland Hertner	S-Am	All
(Germany) Gohm Motorsport - Engstler	255	(Germany) Friedrich Müller	488	6
(United Kingdom) Graypaul Nottingham	151	(United Kingdom) John Dhillon	S	All
(Germany) Autohaus Ulrich	160	(Poland) Andrzej Lewandowski	S	6–7
(Germany) Autohaus Ulrich	166	(Germany) Franz Kewitz	S-Am	3
(Switzerland) Zenith Scuderia	162	(Switzerland) Christophe Hurni	S	All
(Italy) Ineco - Reparto Corse RAM	168	(Greece) Zois Skrimpias	S-Am	All
(Italy) Ineco - Reparto Corse RAM	193	(Italy) Manuela Gostner	S	All
(Italy) Radicci Automobili - Best Lap	181	(Italy) Maurizio Pitorri	S-Am	1, 3
(Italy) Radicci Automobili - Best Lap	218	(Italy) Maurizio Pitorri	488	5, 7
(Italy) Radicci Automobili - Best Lap	296	(Italy) Vincenzo Gibiino	488	1
(Monaco) Scuderia Monte-Carlo	182	(Monaco) Willem van der Vorm	S	1–2, 5, 7
(Germany) Eberlein - Schumacher Racing	188	(Germany) Josef Schumacher	S-Am	1, 3, 5–7
(Czech Republic) Scuderia Praha Racing	211	(Greece) Aleksei Komarov	488	All
(Germany) Gohm Motorsport - Baron Racing Team	215	(Italy) Germano Salernitano	488	1, 6–7
(Germany) Gohm Motorsport - Baron Racing Team	227	(Sweden) Tommy Lindroth	488	All
(Switzerland) Garage Zénith - Best Lap	219	(Switzerland) Ivan David Mari	488	1, 3–5
(Germany) Mertel Motorsport	222	(Sweden) Roger Törnbom	488	5
(Germany) Gohm Motorsport - Herter Racing	228	(Sweden) Christian Kinch	488	1
(Poland) Ferrari Katowice	275	(Germany) Sven Schömer	488	5–7
(Italy) Radicci Automobili - Sanasi Racing	279	(Italy) Germano Marino	488	5, 7
(Italy) CDP - Eureka Racing	299	(Italy) Gabriele Bini	488	5

== Standings ==
=== Trofeo Pirelli ===
Pos.	Driver	MUG (Italy)		BAL (Hungary)		JER (Spain)		ALG (Portugal)		LEC (France)		NUR (Germany)		IMO (Italy)		Points
Pos.	Driver	R1	R2	R1	R2	R1	R2	R1	R2	R1	R2	R1	R2	R1	R2	Points
Pro
1	(Italy) Giacomo Altoè			1	1	1	3	2	1	1	1	2	1	5	1	184
2	(Hungary) Bence Válint	2	1	3	5	2	4	Ret	3	2	3	5	2	1	3	140
3	(Austria) Philipp Baron	5	3	2	2	4	1	3	2	6	6	4	3	2	5	130
4	(Germany) Luca Ludwig	Ret	4			3	2	1	Ret	5	2	1	Ret	Ret	Ret	90
5	(Italy) Max Mugelli	6	6	5	4	5	WD	4	6	Ret	7	6	5	4	4	75
6	(Italy) Luigi Coluccio							5	4	4	Ret	7	4	3	2	58
7	(Germany) Timo Glock	3	2							3	4					43
8	(United States) Dylan Medler							Ret	5	7	5	3	6			31
9	(Germany) Luca Engstler			4	3	WD	5									26
10	(Switzerland) Jean-Luc D'Auria	4	7													11
Pro-Am
1	(Denmark) Claus Zibrandtsen	1	3	6	Ret	Ret	1	1	1	1	1	1	4	4	2	166
2	(Czech Republic) Hendrik Viol	3	1	2	2	1	9	3	DSQ	7	2	2	2	1	1	153
3	(Italy) Marco Zanasi	2	2	4	1	5	2	4	9	3	5	6	7	12	6	109
4	(United Kingdom) Andrew Morrow	6	5	1	3	11	7	2	2	2	4	3	9	7	4	108
5	(Germany) Danilo Del Favero	5	6			4	14	7	4	Ret	6	8	5	3	5	61
6	(Germany) Hanno Laskowski	9	8	3	Ret	3	4	13	16	5	3	9	16	10	Ret	52
7	(Venezuela) Angelo Fontana	16	7			Ret	3	6	5			10	3	11	12	38
8	(Germany) Herbert Geiss	7	9	5	Ret	2	6			11	8	7	6	9	9	37
9	(United Kingdom) James Owen	4	4	DSQ	8	DSQ	8	12	8	4	Ret	11	8	8	8	37
10	(Netherlands) Michael Verhagen											4	15	2	3	33
11	(Germany) Axel Sartingen							Ret	3	6	7	Ret	10	5	7	28
12	David Akhobadze	8	17†	7	4	5	11	6	17	9	9	15	13	16	13	28
13	(Italy) Federico Al Rifai											5	1			24
14	(Germany) Franz Engstler	1	5									WD	WD			24^{1}
15	(Denmark) Andreas Bøgh-Sørensen	17	WD			Ret	5	16	6	Ret	11	Ret	Ret	15	Ret	16
16	(Italy) Giammarco Marzialetti	11	12	8	6	9	10	9	11	8	13			DNS	17	12
17	(Germany) Otto Blank	10	11	9	7	7	12	11	10	10	10	14	12	13	14	11
18	(Denmark) Kim Eriksen	18	13	10	5			Ret	14					Ret	15	10
19	(Germany) Amin Arefpour	13	16	12	9	10	15	15	15	16	16	16	14	17	16	7
20	(Switzerland) Laura Villars	15	10	11	Ret	8	13	Ret	12	15	15					6
21	(Georgia (country)) Davit Kajaia													6	11	5
22	(Denmark) Anders Bidstrup							8	7							4
23	(Germany) Matthias Tomann	12	14							13	12	13	11			3
24	(Denmark) Andreas Ø. Borris							14	13	12	14					2
25	(Grenada) Ruslan Sadreev	14	15	13	WD											2
26	(Italy) David Gostner													14	10	1
27	(Denmark) Jacob Bidstrup							10	Ret							1
28	(Spain) Ivan Velasco Sanchez											12	WD			1
29	(Australia) Cameron Campbell									14	17					1
Pro-Am Ladies
1	(Switzerland) Laura Villars	1	1	1	1	1	1	1	1	1	1					145

Notes:

- ^1 – Franz Engstler competed in round 1 as a Pro, but later entered round 6 in the Pro-Am class. All his points carried over to the Pro-Am classification.
