= Alvise Rodella =

Italian racing driver (born 2007)

- Rodella at Silverstone Circuit in 2026.
- Nationality: (Italy) Italian
- Born: 12 December 2007 (age 18) Desenzano del Garda, Italy
- Categorisation: FIA Silver

Alvise Rodella (born 12 December 2007 in Desenzano del Garda) is an Italian racing driver who last competed for Rinaldi Racing in the European Le Mans Series.

== Career ==
Following a brief karting career where he most notably finished sixth in the 2022 Andrea Margutti Trophy in X30 Senior and tenth at Lonato in the 2022 WSK Champions Cup, Rodella joined AS Motorsport for the first two rounds of the inaugural season of Formula Winter Series. After taking a best result of seventh in race two at Jerez, Rodella joined MP Motorsport to compete in Spanish F4. In his only season in the championship, he scored points three times, taking a best result of ninth in race three at Navarra to finish 20th in the standings at season's end.

In 2024, Rodella joined Xcel Motorsport to compete in the Formula 4 UAE Championship. Initially racing in the first two rounds, Rodella then stayed with the team for the entire season, scoring three top tens, including a best result of sixth in the reverse-grid race of the first Yas Marina round. For the rest of the season, Rodella joined Van Amersfoort Racing for a dual campaign in both the Italian F4 Championship and Euro 4 Championships. After taking best results of 11th at Le Castellet in the former and 17th at Mugello in the latter, Rodella left the team and both championships in September.

Leaving single-seaters at the end of 2024, Rodella joined CLX Motorsport alongside Pierre-Alexandre Provost to compete in the LMP3 class of the Michelin Le Mans Cup. Finishing runner-up on his prototype debut at Barcelona, Rodella then took his first win in the series by 11 seconds at Le Castellet and scored another podium at Silverstone, to end the year fourth in points.

Rodella remained in LMP3 competition in 2026, as he joined Rinaldi Racing to make his debut in the European Le Mans Series. In his maiden ELMS season, Rodella won at Barcelona and Spa, but was stripped of the latter on technical grounds post-race, en route to third in points.

== Karting record ==
=== Karting career summary ===
Season	Series	Team	Position
2020	Andrea Margutti Trophy – X30 Junior	Babyrace Driver Academy	29th
2021	Andrea Margutti Trophy – X30 Junior	Babyrace Driver Academy	31st
2021	WSK Open Cup – OKJ	Team Driver Racing Kart	55th
2021	Trofeo Delle Industrie – OKJ	Team Driver Racing Kart	8th
2021	South Garda Winter Cup – OKJ	Team Driver Racing Kart	NC
2021	WSK Final Cup – OKJ	Team Driver Racing Kart	NC
2021	Italian Karting Championship – X30 Junior		37th
2021	Coppa Italian ACI Karting – X30 Junior		8th
2022	WSK Champions Cup – OK	Team Driver Racing Kart	31st
2022	IAME Winter Cup – X30 Senior	Team Driver Racing Kart	NC
2022	WSK Super Master Series – OK (Note: Rodella competed for Team Driver Racing Kart in rounds 2, 4 and competed for KR Motorsport in round 3.)	Team Driver Racing Kart	72nd
2022	Andrea Margutti Trophy – X30 Senior	Team Driver Racing Kart	6th
2022	IAME Euro Series – X30 Senior	Team Driver Racing Kart	131st
2022	WSK Euro Series – OKJ	Forza Racing	53rd
2022	Karting World Championship – OK	Forza Racing	NC
2022	WSK Open Cup – OK	Forza Racing	29th
2022	WSK Final Cup – OK	Forza Racing	41st
2022	Kartmasters British GP – X30 Senior	Mick Barrett Racing	22nd
2022	Italian Karting Championship – X30 Senior		37th

== Racing record ==
=== Racing career summary ===
Season	Series	Team	Races	Wins	Poles	F/Laps	Podiums	Points	Position
2023	Formula Winter Series	AS Motorsport	4	0	0	0	0	16	12th
2023	F4 Spanish Championship	MP Motorsport	21	0	0	0	0	4	20th
2023	Italian F4 Championship	BVM Racing	3	0	0	0	0	0	46th
2023	F4 British Championship	Phynsis by Argenti	3	0	0	0	0	0	27th
2024	Formula 4 UAE Championship	Xcel Motorsport	15	0	0	0	0	10	21st
2024	Italian F4 Championship	Van Amersfoort Racing	15	0	0	0	0	0	28th
2024	Euro 4 Championship	Van Amersfoort Racing	6	0	0	0	0	0	31st
2025	Le Mans Cup – LMP3	CLX Motorsport	7	1	1	0	3	62	4th
2025	Ligier European Series - JS P4	LR Motorsport	1	0	0	0	0	0	NC†
2026	European Le Mans Series – LMP3	Rinaldi Racing	6	1	0	0	3	77	**3rd**
2026	Le Mans Cup – LMP3	Rinaldi Racing	1	0	0	0	0	0	NC†

=== Complete Formula Winter Series results ===
(key) (Races in bold indicate pole position; races in italics indicate fastest lap)

Year	Team	1	2	3	4	5	6	7	8	DC	Points
2023	AS Motorsport	JER; 1; 9	JER; 2; 7	CRT; 1; 8	CRT; 2; 8	NAV; 1	NAV; 2	CAT; 1	CAT; 2	12th	16

=== Complete F4 Spanish Championship results ===
(key) (Races in bold indicate pole position) (Races in italics indicate fastest lap)

Year	Team	1	2	3	4	5	6	7	8	9	10	11	12	13	14	15	16	17	18	19	20	21	DC	Points
2023	MP Motorsport	SPA; 1; 20	SPA; 2 Ret	SPA; 3; 14	ARA; 1; 23	ARA; 2; 17	ARA; 3; 10	NAV; 1; 10	NAV; 2; 17	NAV; 3; 9	JER; 1 Ret	JER; 2; 15	JER; 3; 23	EST; 1; 19	EST; 2; 16	EST; 3; 18	CRT; 1; 19	CRT; 2; 25	CRT; 3; 12	CAT; 1; 19	CAT; 2; 10	CAT; 3; 16	20th	4

=== Complete Italian F4 Championship results ===
(key) (Races in bold indicate pole position) (Races in italics indicate fastest lap)

Year	Team	1	2	3	4	5	6	7	8	9	10	11	12	13	14	15	16	17	18	19	20	21	22	DC	Points
2023	BVM Racing	IMO; 1	IMO; 2	IMO; 3	IMO; 4	MIS; 1	MIS; 2	MIS; 3	SPA; 1	SPA; 2	SPA; 3	MNZ; 1	MNZ; 2	MNZ; 3	LEC; 1; 21	LEC; 2 Ret	LEC; 3; 24	MUG; 1	MUG; 2	MUG; 3	VLL; 1	VLL; 2	VLL; 3	46th	0
2024	Van Amersfoort Racing	MIS; 1; 23	MIS; 2 Ret	MIS; 3; 19	IMO; 1; 16	IMO; 2; 16	IMO; 3 Ret	VLL; 1; 12	VLL; 2; 25	VLL; 3; 27	MUG; 1; 19	MUG; 2 Ret	MUG; 3 Ret	LEC; 1; 21	LEC; 2; 18	LEC; 3; 11	CAT; 1	CAT; 2	CAT; 3	MNZ; 1	MNZ; 2	MNZ; 3		28th	0

=== Complete F4 British Championship results ===
(key) (Races in bold indicate pole position) (Races in italics indicate fastest lap)

Year	Team	1	2	3	4	5	6	7	8	9	10	11	12	13	14	15	16	17	18	19	20	21	22	23	24	25	26	27	28	29	30	31	DC	Points
2023	Phynsis by Argenti	DON; 1	DON; 2	DON; 3	BHI; 1	BHI; 2	BHI; 3	SNE; 1	SNE; 2	SNE; 3	THR; 1	THR; 2	THR; 3	OUL; 1	OUL; 2	OUL; 3	SIL; 1	SIL; 2	SIL; 3	CRO; 1	CRO; 2	CRO; 3	KNO; 1	KNO; 2	KNO; 3	DPGP; 1 Ret	DPGP; 2	DPGP; 3; 16	DPGP; 4 Ret	BHGP; 1	BHGP; 2	BHGP; 3	27th	0

=== Complete Formula 4 UAE Championship results ===
(key) (Races in bold indicate pole position) (Races in italics indicate fastest lap)

Year	Team	1	2	3	4	5	6	7	8	9	10	11	12	13	14	15	DC	Points
2024	Xcel Motorsport	YMC1; 1; 10	YMC1; 2; 6	YMC1; 3 Ret	YMC2; 1; 23	YMC2; 2; 10	YMC2; 3 Ret	DUB1; 1; 12	DUB1; 2; 17	DUB1; 3 Ret	YMC3; 1; 13	YMC3; 2 Ret	YMC3; 3; 26	DUB2; 1; 30	DUB2; 2; 27	DUB2; 3; 12	21st	10

=== Complete Euro 4 Championship results ===
(key) (Races in bold indicate pole position; races in italics indicate fastest lap)

Year	Team	1	2	3	4	5	6	7	8	9	DC	Points
2024	Van Amersfoort Racing	MUG; 1; 17	MUG; 2; 21	MUG; 3 Ret	RBR; 1; 23	RBR; 2; 18	RBR; 3; 20	MNZ; 1	MNZ; 2	MNZ; 3	31st	0

=== Complete Le Mans Cup results ===
(key) (Races in bold indicate pole position; results in italics indicate fastest lap)

Year	Entrant	Class	Chassis	1	2	3	4	5	6	7	Rank	Points
2025	CLX Motorsport	LMP3	Ligier JS P325	CAT; 2	**LEC**; 1	LMS; 1; 9	LMS; 2; 21	SPA; 11	SIL; 3	ALG; Ret	4th	62
2026	Rinaldi Racing	LMP3	Ligier JS P325	BAR	LEC	LMS; 14	SPA	SIL	POR		NC†	0†

=== Complete European Le Mans Series results ===
(key) (Races in bold indicate pole position; results in italics indicate fastest lap)

Year	Entrant	Class	Chassis	Engine	1	2	3	4	5	6	Rank	Points
2026	Rinaldi Racing	LMP3	Ligier JS P325	Toyota V35A 3.5 L V6	CAT; 1	LEC; 7	IMO; 2	SPA; DSQ	SIL; 5	ALG; 2	3rd	77
