= Brandon McCaughan =

Irish racing driver (born 2003)

- Born: Brandon Charles McCaughan; 16 December 2003 (age 22); Ahoghill, Northern Ireland, United Kingdom
- Nationality: (Republic of Ireland) Irish
- Categorisation: FIA Silver

Brandon Charles McCaughan (born 16 December 2003) is an Irish racing driver who last competed for Team Virage in the Ligier European Series in the JS P4 class.

== Career ==
McCaughan made his Formula Ford debut in 2021, winning the Janet Cesar Memorial Trophy for pre-1993 cars in the Walter Hayes Trophy and also racing in the Northern Irish FF1600 Championship. He then moved to the National FF1600 championship, finishing eighth in his maiden season in the series, and also finishing fifth overall in the Formula Ford Festival at the end of the year. During 2022, McCaughan was also a finalist for a £20,000 prize fund to compete in GB4 the following year, but was beaten to it Colin Queen in the shootout.

Remaining in Formula Ford competition for the following year, McCaughan led the standings after the opening round despite not taking any overall wins, but lost the lead at Snetterton after Oldfield Motorsport teammate Lucas Romanek won race three. McCaughan then won race one at Kirkistown and finished the other two races on the podium, but after taking just a handful of podiums in the second half of the season, McCaughan fell to third in the overall standings. At the end of the year, McCaughan edged out Nathan Yu to win £20,000 to compete in GB4 the following year.

Five months later, McCaughan joined KMR Sport for his maiden season in GB4. On his debut at Oulton Park, McCaughan took pole for both the first two races, finishing third in race one before taking his maiden series win in race two before retiring in race three. He then finished no higher than sixth at Silverstone in what was supposed to be his final round, before remaining in the series for the third round at Donington Park. In said round, McCaughan finished second in race one before taking his second and final win of the season in race two. However, it turned out to be the Irishman's last appearance in GB4 as he left the series after three rounds due to budget issues.

After leaving GB4, McCaughan tested with Team Virage during the summer of 2024, McCaughan made his debut in sports cars with them, racing in the JS P4 class at the season-ending round at Algarve of the Ligier European Series. Driving alongside Mikkel Gaarde Pedersen, the duo finished fourth and fifth on their series debut.

Having sat most of 2025 on the sidelines, McCaughan returned to racing in August by making his LMP3 debut for Bretton Racing at the Spa round of the Michelin Le Mans Cup. Driving alongside Dane Arendsen, the duo finished 14th after falling as low as 23rd during the race. McCaughan then joined Team Virage to race in the JS P4 class of the Ligier European Series at Silverstone alongside Leo Robinson, winning both races and ending the year ninth in points.

The following year, McCaughan returned to Team Virage for his first full season in the JS P4 class of the Ligier European Series. Paired up with Sebastien Kawpeng for his first full season in the series, McCaughan took a lone win at Spa from pole, en route to seventh in the JS P4 standings.

== Racing record ==
=== Racing career summary ===
Season	Series	Team	Races	Wins	Poles	F/Laps	Podiums	Points	Position
2021	Northern Irish Formula Ford 1600							81	4th
2021	Walter Hayes Trophy		1	0	0	0	0	—N/a	25th
2021	Formula Ford Festival – Historic Pre-1993		1	0	0	0	0	—N/a	**1st**
2022	BRSCC National Formula Ford Championship – Pro		19	0	0	0	0	279	7th
2022	Walter Hayes Trophy		1	0	0	0	0	—N/a	16th
2022	Formula Ford Festival	Oldfield Motorsport	1	0	0	0	0	—N/a	5th
2023	National Formula Ford 1600	Oldfield Motorsport	18	2	1	3	6	310	**3rd**
2023	Walter Hayes Trophy		1	0	0	0	0	—N/a	10th
2023	Formula Ford Festival		1	0	0	0	0	—N/a	8th
2024	GB4 Championship	KMR Sport	8	2	2	1	4	171	13th
2024	Ligier European Series – JS P4	Team Virage	2	0	0	0	0	22	13th
2025	Le Mans Cup – LMP3	Bretton Racing	1	0	0	0	0	0	25th
2025	Ligier European Series – JS P4	Team Virage	2	2	1	0	2	50	9th
2026	Ligier European Series – JS P4	Team Virage	11	1	2	0	2	99	7th

=== Complete GB4 Championship results ===
(key) (Races in bold indicate pole position) (Races in italics indicate fastest lap)

Year	Entrant	1	2	3	4	5	6	7	8	9	10	11	12	13	14	15	16	17	18	19	20	21	D.C.	Points
2024	KMR Sport	**OUL**; **1**; 3	**OUL**; **2**; 1	OUL; 3 Ret	SIL1; 1; 6	SIL1; 2; 8	SIL1; 3 C	DON1; 1; 2	DON1; 2; 1	DON1; 3; 6^{8}	SNE; 1	SNE; 2	SNE; 3	SIL2; 1	SIL2; 2	SIL2; 3	DON2; 1	DON2; 2	DON2; 3	BRH; 1	BRH; 2	BRH; 3	13th	171

=== Complete Ligier European Series results ===
(key) (Races in bold indicate pole position; results in italics indicate fastest lap)

Year	Entrant	Class	Chassis	1	2	3	4	5	6	7	8	9	10	11	Rank	Points
2024	Team Virage	JS P4	Ligier JS P4	CAT; 1	CAT; 2	LEC; 1	LEC; 2	LMS	SPA; 1	SPA; 2	MUG; 1	MUG; 2	ALG; 1; 4	ALG; 2; 5	13th	22
2025	Team Virage	JS P4	Ligier JS P4	BAR; 1	BAR; 2	LEC; 1	LEC; 2	LMS	SPA; 1	SPA; 2	**SIL**; **1**; 1	SIL; 2; 1	ALG; 1	ALG; 2	9th	50
2026	Team Virage	JS P4	Ligier JS P4	BAR; 1; 8	BAR; 2; 5	LEC; 1; 5	LEC; 2; 10	LMS; 11	SPA; 1; 3	**SPA**; **2**; 1	**SIL**; **1**; 4	SIL; 2; 5	ALG; 1; 7	ALG; 2; 7	7th	99

=== Complete Le Mans Cup results ===
(key) (Races in bold indicate pole position; results in italics indicate fastest lap)

Year	Entrant	Class	Chassis	1	2	3	4	5	6	7	Rank	Points
2025	Bretton Racing	LMP3	Ligier JS P325	CAT	LEC	LMS; 1	LMS; 2	SPA; 14	SIL	ALG	25th	0

^{*} Season still in progress.
