= Johnathan Hoggard =

British racing driver (born 2000)

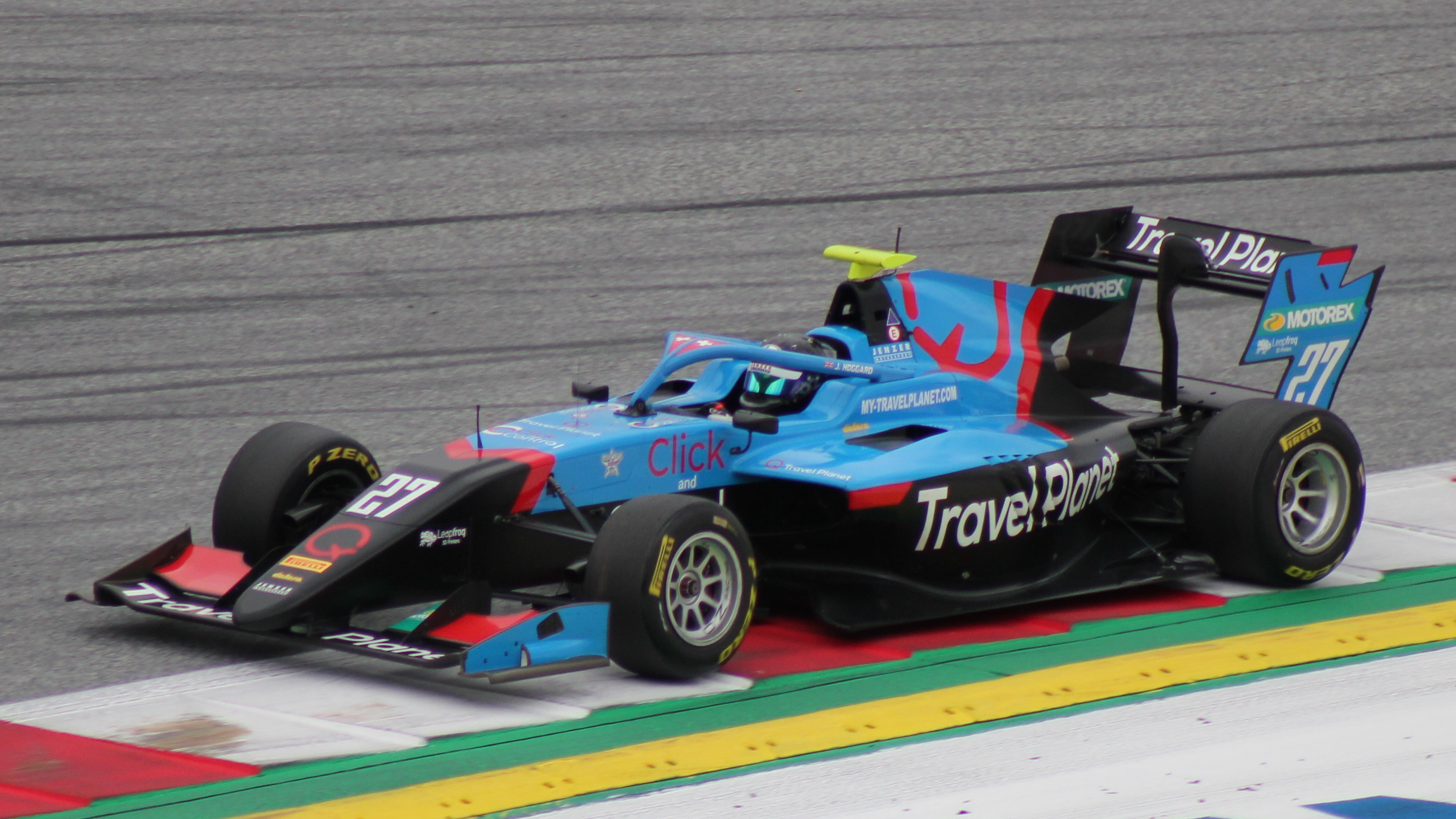
- Hoggard driving the Dallara F3 2019 during the 2021 Spielberg Formula 3 round.
- Nationality: (United Kingdom) British
- Born: 15 November 2000 (age 25) Spalding, United Kingdom

FIA Formula 3 Championship career
- Debut season: 2021
- Categorisation: FIA Silver
- Car number: 27
- Former teams: Jenzer Motorsport
- Starts: 17 (18 entries)
- Wins: 0
- Podiums: 0
- Poles: 0
- Fastest laps: 0
- Best finish: 20th in 2021

Previous series
- 2020 2019 2017–18: Formula Renault Eurocup; BRDC British F3 Championship; F4 British Championship

Awards
- 2020 2019: Sunoco Whelen Challenge; Autosport BRDC Award

Johnathan Hoggard (born 15 November 2000 in Spalding) is a British racing driver who currently serves as a test-driver for Envision Racing in Formula E. He has previously competed in the FIA Formula 3 Championship for Jenzer Motorsport, was the 2019 BRDC British Formula 3 Championship runner-up, and finished third in British F4 in 2018. Hoggard was awarded with the Aston Martin Autosport BRDC Award for 2019.

== Career ==
=== Karting ===
Hoggard started karting in the UK when he was thirteen years old. He competed in series such as and Senior Rotax Karting Winter Series Valencia, Hoggard won his first karting championship in 2016 in Belgium with the Max Challenge Senior Rotax and BNL Senior Rotax Kick-Off. In the same year, he became MSA British Junior Karting Champion.

=== British F4 ===
Due to a successful karting campaign in 2016, Fortec Motorsports signed Hoggard up to race for them halfway through the 2017 British F4 season Hoggard scored his first points in the third race at Snetterton, where he finished tenth. At the penultimate round of the season in race three at Silverstone, Hoggard finished third, securing his first single seater podium of his career. In 2018, Fortec signed Hoggard for a full season where he won eight races and finished on the podium a further two times. Hoggard finished the season on 339 points and in third position behind Kiern Jewiss and Ayrton Simmons who finished first and second respectively.

=== British F3 ===
Following his performance in the British F4 series, Hoggard was again signed up by Fortec to race for them in British F3 championship in 2019. In the second race of the final round of the season himself and championship rival Clément Novalak collided meaning they both finished at the bottom end of the points. Hoggard finished 15th whereas Novalak finished 12th which gave Novalak four points, despite Hoggard winning the last race he still fell short of the title. He finished the season 23 points behind Novalak with 482 and seven wins, more than anyone on the grid. His performances across the season also meant he won the Sunoco Whelen Challenge and with it, a drive at the 2020 24 Hours of Daytona with Precision Performance Motorsports.

=== Aston Martin Autosport BRDC Young Driver ===
Hoggard was nominated for the Aston Martin Autosport BRDC Young Driver in early November 2019 along with Enaam Ahmed, Jamie Chadwick and Ayrton Simmons. Hoggard won the award, and with it a cash prize of £200,000 and a Formula One test.

=== Daytona and Formula Renault ===
Hoggard started 2020 competing in the 24 Hours of Daytona for Precision Performance Motorsports, sharing a Lamborghini Huracán GT3 Evo with Brandon Gdovic, Mark Kvamme and Eric Lux. They retired after 608 laps due to gearbox problems.

Hoggard was originally set to twin the Euroformula Open Championship and the Porsche Carrera Cup Asia during the year, driving for Fortec Motorsports and Absolute Racing respectively. However, both plans fell through due to the impact of the COVID-19 pandemic, as Fortec pulled out of Euroformula and the season of the one-make GT3 series was cancelled.

Hoggard was later announced to drive for French outfit R-ace GP in the 2020 Formula Renault Eurocup in round two at Imola in June. He replaced Indian driver Kush Maini, who was unable to compete due to financial reasons caused by the COVID-19 pandemic. He retired in the pits in both races but was classified as 18th in the second one.

=== Formula 3 ===
Having already driven for several teams in testing, Hoggard joined Jenzer Motorsport to compete in the 2021 FIA Formula 3 Championship, replacing Pierre-Louis Chovet, who left the team after the opening round. Hoggard scored his first point in the series, at the second sprint race at Austria.

Hoggard drove for Hitech Grand Prix in the post-season test but was not signed to the British-based team or any other team for 2022.

=== Formula One ===
After winning the Aston Martin Autosport BRDC Young Driver in 2019, Hoggard conducted a one-off Formula One test with Red Bull Racing at Silverstone in October 2020.

=== Formula E ===
After a three-year hiatus from racing, Hoggard was chosen by Envision Racing to drive in the Formula E Berlin rookie test at the Tempelhof Airport Street Circuit.

== Karting record ==
=== Karting career summary ===
Season	Series	Team	Position
2013	Trent Valley Kart Club - Minimax	Protrain	43rd
2014	Super One Series Championship - Mini Max		3rd
2014	Kartmasters British GP - Mini Max		3rd
2015	Rotax Max Wintercup - Junior Max	KR Sport	11th
2015	Super One Series Championship - Rotax Junior	KR Sport	6th
2015	Rotax International Open - Junior	KR Sport	5th
2015	Rotax Max Euro Trophy - Junior Max	KR Sport	4th
2015	Kartmasters British GP - Rotax Junior		3rd
2016	Rotax Max Wintercup - Senior Max	KR Sport	4th
2016	Rotax Max Challenge Grand Finals - Junior Max	KR Sport	23rd
2016	Super One Series Championship - Rotax Junior	KR Sport	3rd
2016	Super One Series Championship - OK Junior		1st
2016	CIK-FIA World Championship - OK	Kosmic Racing Dept	28th
2017	Rotax Wintercup - Senior Max		4th

== Racing record ==
=== Racing career summary ===
Season	Series	Team	Races	Wins	Poles	F/Laps	Podiums	Points	Position
2017	F4 British Championship	Fortec Motorsports	12	0	0	0	1	20	16th
2018	F4 British Championship	Fortec Motorsports	30	8	6	2	10	339	**3rd**
2019	BRDC British Formula 3 Championship	Fortec Motorsports	24	7	7	9	12	482	**2nd**
2020	IMSA SportsCar Championship - GTD	Precision Performance Motorsports	1	0	0	0	0	16	56th
2020	Formula Renault Eurocup	R-ace GP	2	0	0	0	0	0	22nd
2021	FIA Formula 3 Championship	Jenzer Motorsport	17	0	0	0	0	14	20th

=== Complete F4 British Championship results ===
(key) (Races in bold indicate pole position) (Races in italics indicate fastest lap)

Year	Team	1	2	3	4	5	6	7	8	9	10	11	12	13	14	15	16	17	18	19	20	21	22	23	24	25	26	27	28	29	30	31	Pos	Points
2017	Fortec Motorsports	BRI; 1	BRI; 2	BRI; 3	DON; 1	DON; 2	DON; 3	THR; 1	THR; 2	THR; 3	OUL; 1	OUL; 2	OUL; 3	CRO; 1	CRO; 2	CRO; 3	SNE; 1; 17	SNE; 2; 11	SNE; 3; 10	KNO; 1 Ret	KNO; 2	KNO; 3; 17	KNO; 4; 17	ROC; 1	ROC; 2	ROC; 3	SIL; 1; 8	SIL; 2 Ret	SIL; 3; 3	BHGP; 1; 13	BHGP; 2; 14	BHGP; 3; 11	16th	20
2018	Fortec Motorsports	BRI; 1; 6	BRI; 2; 5	BRI; 3; 11	**DON**; **1**; 1	DON; 2; 5	DON; 3; 1	THR; 1; 6	THR; 2 Ret	THR; 3; 13	OUL; 1; 8	OUL; 2; 7	OUL; 3 Ret	CRO; 1; 6	CRO; 2; 9	CRO; 3; 7	SNE; 1; 8	SNE; 2; 8	SNE; 3; 4	ROC; 1; 7	ROC; 2; 1	ROC; 3; 5	**KNO**; **1**; 1	KNO; 2 Ret	**KNO**; **3**; 1	**SIL**; **1**; 1	SIL; 2; 6	**SIL**; **3**; 1	BHGP; 1; 2	BHGP; 2; 3	**BHGP**; **3**; 1		3rd	339

=== Complete BRDC British Formula 3 Championship results ===
(key) (Races in bold indicate pole position) (Races in italics indicate fastest lap)

Year	Team	1	2	3	4	5	6	7	8	9	10	11	12	13	14	15	16	17	18	19	20	21	22	23	24	Pos	Points
2019	Fortec Motorsports	OUL; 1; 3	OUL; 2; 8^{3}	OUL; 3; 1	SNE; 1; 1	SNE; 2; 8^{8}	**SNE**; **3** Ret	SIL1; 1; 8	SIL1; 2; 2^{10}	SIL1; 3; 2	**DON1**; **1**; 1	DON1; 2 Ret	**DON1**; **3**; 1	SPA; 1; 8	SPA; 2; 7^{4}	SPA; 3; 13	**BRH**; **1**; 1	BRH; 2; 12^{4}	**BRH**; **3**; 2	SIL2; 1; 3	SIL2; 2; 14	SIL2; 3; 5	**DON2**; **1**; 1	DON2; 2; 15	**DON2**; **3**; 1	2nd	482

=== Complete Formula Renault Eurocup results ===
(key) (Races in bold indicate pole position) (Races in italics indicate fastest lap)

Year	Team	1	2	3	4	5	6	7	8	9	10	11	12	13	14	15	16	17	18	19	20	Pos	Points
2020	R-ace GP	MNZ; 1	MNZ; 2	IMO; 1 Ret	IMO; 2; 18†	NÜR; 1	NÜR; 2	MAG; 1	MAG; 2	ZAN; 1	ZAN; 2	CAT; 1	CAT; 2	SPA; 1	SPA; 2	IMO; 1	IMO; 2	HOC; 1	HOC; 2	LEC; 1	LEC; 2	22nd	0

^{†} Driver did not finish, but was classified as they completed more than 90% of race distance.

=== Complete FIA Formula 3 Championship results ===
(key) (Races in bold indicate pole position; races in italics indicate points for the fastest lap of top ten finishers)

Year	Entrant	1	2	3	4	5	6	7	8	9	10	11	12	13	14	15	16	17	18	19	20	21	DC	Points
2021	Jenzer Motorsport	CAT; 1	CAT; 2	CAT; 3	LEC; 1 Ret	LEC; 2; 26	LEC; 3; 18	RBR; 1; 18	RBR; 2; 10	RBR; 3; 25	HUN; 1; 22	HUN; 2; 22	HUN; 3; 18	SPA; 1; 6	SPA; 2; 24	SPA; 3; 16	ZAN; 1 Ret	ZAN; 2; 19	ZAN; 3; 20	SOC; 1; 12	SOC; 2 C	SOC; 3; 6	20th	14

Sporting positions
Preceded by Tom Gamble	Autosport BRDC Award winner 2019	Succeeded by Zak O'Sullivan
