= Ayrton Simmons =

British-Spanish racing driver (born 2001)

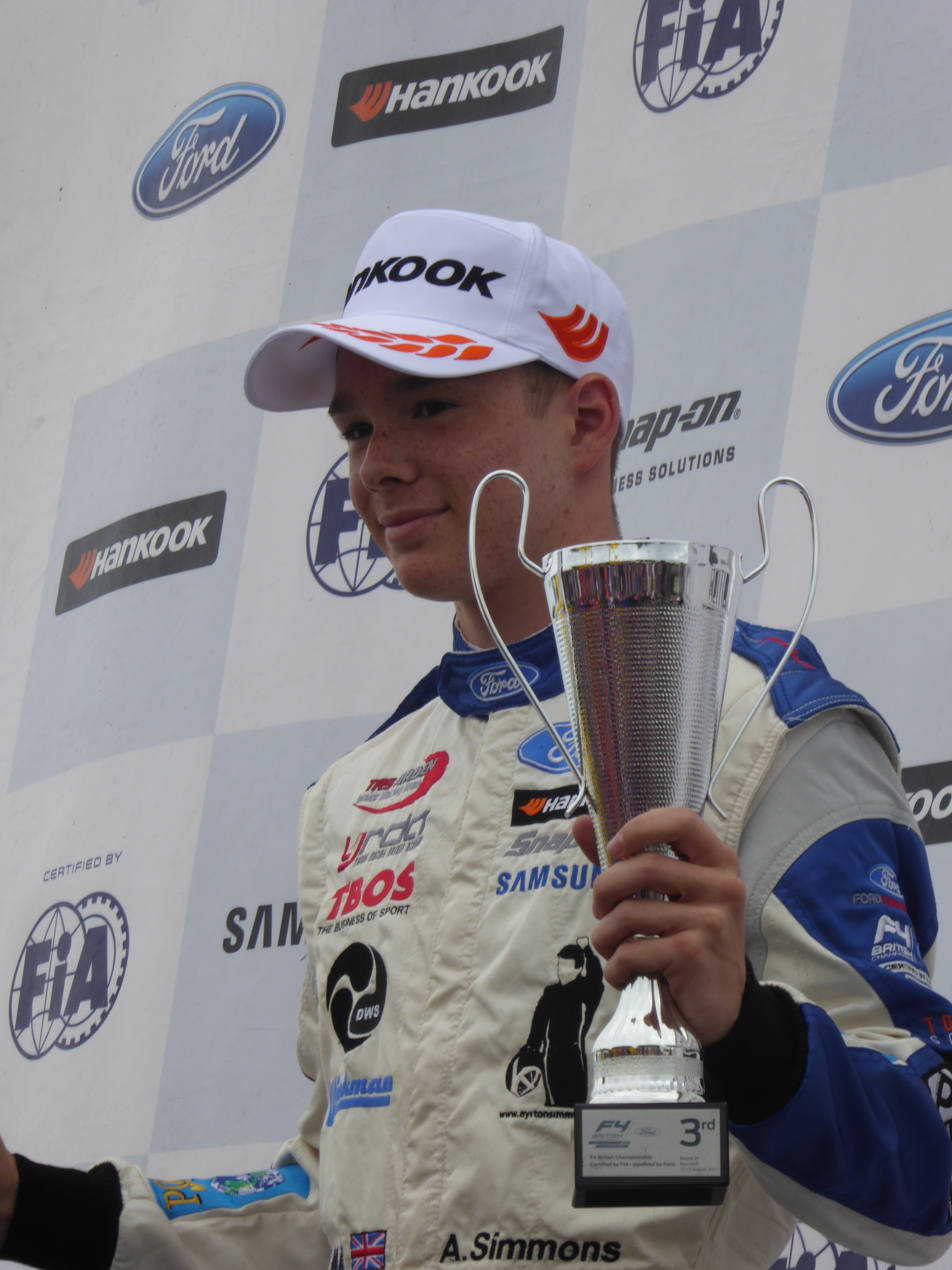
- Simmons in 2017
- Nationality: (United Kingdom) British
- Born: 29 April 2001 (age 25) Harlow, United Kingdom

Ultimate Cup Series career
- Debut season: 2023
- Current team: TS Corse
- Categorisation: FIA Silver
- Car number: 24
- Starts: 7 (7 entries)
- Wins: 1
- Podiums: 4
- Poles: 1
- Fastest laps: 0
- Best finish: 3rd in 2023

Previous series
- 2021–2022 2020 2019 2018–2021 2016–2018: FIA Formula 3 Championship; Euroformula Open Championship; F3 Asian Championship; GB3 Championship; F4 British Championship

Ayrton Miguel Simmons Fernández (born 29 April 2001) is a British-Spanish racing driver, who last competed in the 2024 Ultimate Cup Series with TS Corse. He competed in the 2022 Euroformula Open Championship for Drivex School and the 2022 FIA Formula 3 Championship for Charouz Racing System. He is the vice-champion of the 2018 F4 British and the 2021 GB3 Championship.

== Early career ==
=== Karting ===
Simmons started his international karting career at the age of five in small Spanish championships and won the Rotax Max Challenge Grand Finals in the Micro Max category in 2012. He then competed in various national championships, such as the Super 1 Championships and Kartmasters British Grand Prix. He raced in karts until 2015.

=== F4 British Championship ===
==== 2016 ====
Simmons made his car racing debut in the third round of the 2016 F4 British Championship with the TRS Arden Junior Racing Team at the age of fifteen. His form improved from round to round, culminating with his first podium at the final race of the season. This led to him finishing eleventh in the overall standings and second in the rookie cup.

==== 2017 ====
Simmons continued to race in the series in 2017 with the same team, this time for the whole season. He started his season off strongly with a victory at Brands Hatch, Simmons scored five more podiums and ended up seventh in the championship, three and five positions behind teammates Alex Quinn and Oscar Piastri, respectively.

==== 2018 ====
Simmons stayed on for a third season in British F4, this time competing with JHR Developments. Simmons again started strongly and had his best season, taking two wins in the first round at Brands Hatch. Simmons would win again at the fourth round in Oulton Park before claiming his last win during the eighth round at the Knockhill Racing Circuit. Overall, he scored four wins and eight further podiums on his way to second in the standings, 71 points behind champion Kiern Jewiss.

=== BRDC Formula 3 Championship ===
==== 2018 ====
In 2018, Simmons made his debut in the BRDC British Formula 3 Championship with Chris Dittmann Racing, scoring 88 points and finishing 19th in the standings.

==== 2019 ====
For the 2019 season, Simmons made a deal to race in the championship on a full-time basis. He scored his first podiums in the opening round at Oulton Park and achieved his first win at Silverstone in the third race. His next race win came at Spa-Francorchamps, however, by then he had already lost ground to his championship rivals Clément Novalak and Johnathan Hoggard. Simmons won another race at the second Silverstone round and finished third in the overall standings, just 55 points behind champion Novalak. At the end of the year, he was selected in the final four for the 2019 Aston Martin BRDC Award, but it was eventually won by British F3 rival Johnathan Hoggard.

Midway through the season in May, Simmons joined the 2019 F3 Asian Championship. He partook in two rounds and ended tenth in the standings.

==== 2020 ====
In 2020, Simmons made two appearances in British F3, one with Chris Dittmann Racing and one with JHR Developments, respectively. He scored two podiums in each of the rounds and amassed two victories at Brands Hatch. Despite those two rounds, Simmons still ranked 17th in the standings.

==== 2021 ====
The 2021 BRDC British Formula 3 Championship was the fourth season Simmons competed at that level. Returning to Chris Dittmann Racing, Simmons won the first race of the season at a weekend where he secured both pole positions. His next win would come at the next round in Silverstone during the last race. In the second Silverstone round, he took two victories, which were his last of the year. However, the championship was largely dominated by the eventual champion Zak O'Sullivan. Simmons settled for vice-champion with four wins and one more podium.

=== Euroformula Open Championship ===
==== 2020 ====
Simmons progressed to the Euroformula Open Championship in 2020 with Double R Racing. However, after just three rounds, he unexpectedly stopped his campaign due to budget issues. He was left to end the standings 11th with 62 points.

==== 2022 ====
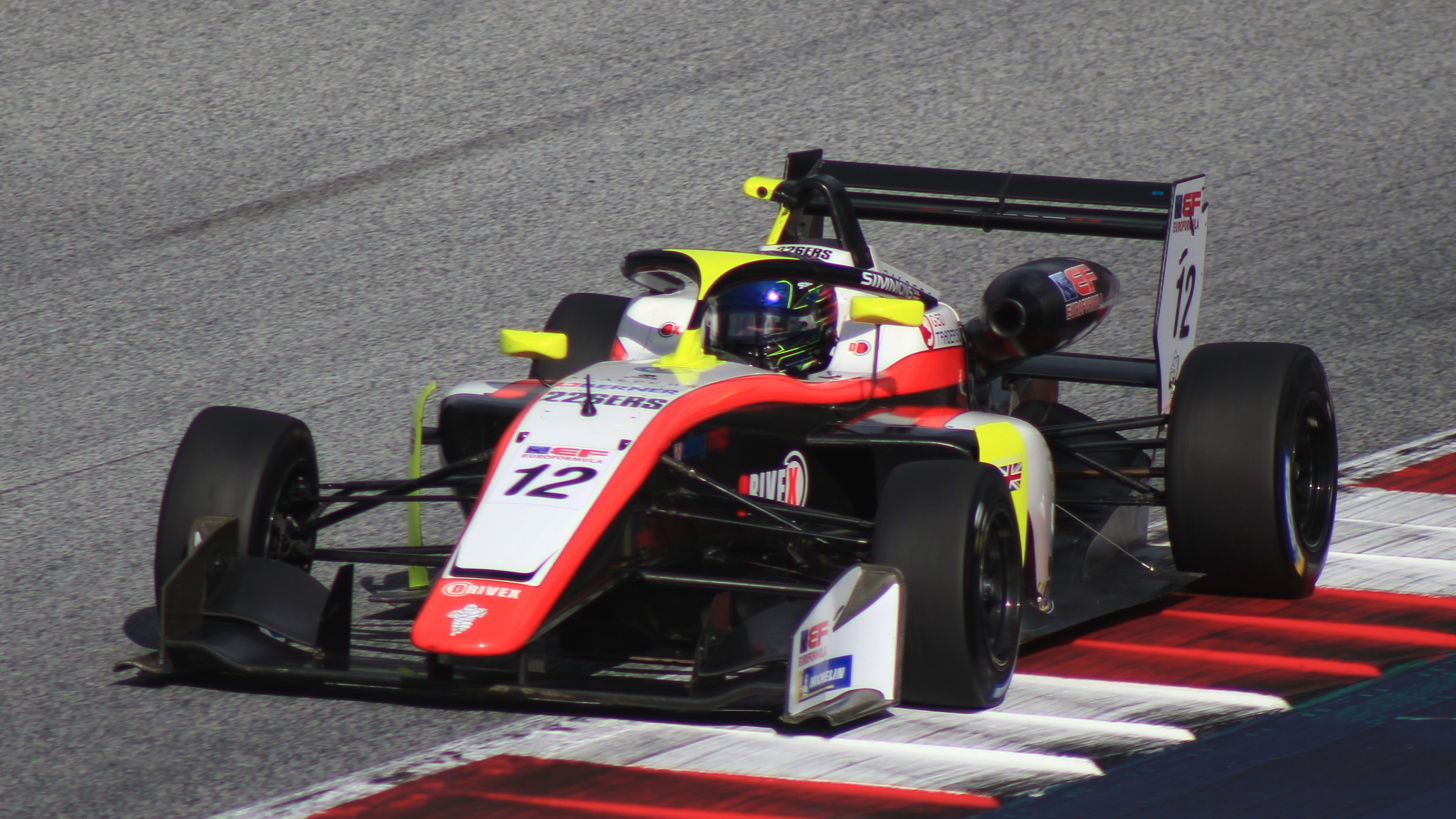
Simmons racing in the 2022 Euroformula Open at the Red Bull Ring.

After losing his Formula 3 seat, Simmons returned to the Euroformula Open with Drivex School.

On his return, Simmons achieved a third-place podium in his second race at the Hungaroring. Simmons remained with Drivex for Imola, but the team did not turn up for that weekend. Despite that, Simmons would return with the team for the next round at the Red Bull Ring. Once again, for the next round, Drivex was absent for the Monza round. Simmons did return for the last round at Circuit de Barcelona-Catalunya, and scored a second place in the second race. He ended the year tenth in the standings, with 85 points.

=== FIA Formula 3 Championship ===
==== 2021 ====
On 20 September 2021, it was announced Simmons would step up to the FIA Formula 3 Championship for the final round of the season at Sochi Autodrom, replacing Hunter Yeany at Charouz Racing System. He finished both of his races in 24th and 21st place, respectively.

==== 2022 ====
Simmons remained with the team for the full 2022 season. Starting 29th in Bahrain, he made good progress in the races, taking 18th and 19th place. However, budget issues forced Simmons out of the championship, and he was replaced by former Charouz driver David Schumacher. Simmons ended the championship 35th in the standings.

== Endurance racing career ==
=== 2023 season: Move to LMP3 ===
For 2023, Simmons would switch to endurance racing in the Ultimate Cup Series with TS Corse. He achieved a second place in his debut at the first Paul Ricard round, before proceeding to take his first endurance racing victory, in his class, at the next race in Navarra. Another second place was secured Magny-Cours. With this, Simmons would finish third in the overall standings.

=== 2024 season ===
Simmons had been set to take part in the 2024 Le Mans Cup with Murphy Prototypes, but he announced in an Instagram post that his contract to compete with the team was terminated. Despite this, Simmons would return to the Ultimate Cup Series with TS Corse, for the second round at the Algarve International Circuit.

== Personal life ==
Simmons was born in Harlow, Essex to an English father and a Spanish mother, and lived in the Madrid neighbourhood of Vallecas from the age of 4 to 14 before moving back to Epping. He was named after the late three-time Formula One World Champion Ayrton Senna.

== Karting record ==
=== Karting career summary ===
Season	Series	Team	Position
2012	Rotax Max Challenge Grand Finals — Micro MAX		1st
2014	Rotax International Open — Junior		21st
2014	Super 1 National Championship — Rotax Mini Max		29th
2014	Rotax Euro Challenge — Junior		24th
2015	Kartmasters British Grand Prix — X30 Junior		5th
2015	Rotax Max Euro Challenge — Junior	Coles Racing	17th
2015	Super 1 National Championship — X30 Junior		13th
2015	Super 1 National Championship — Rotax Max Junior		17th
2015	Rotax Max Wintercup — Rotax Max Junior	Coles Racing	15th

== Racing record ==
=== Racing career summary ===
Season	Series	Team	Races	Wins	Poles	F/Laps	Podiums	Points	Position
2016	F4 British Championship	TRS Arden Junior Racing Team	24	0	0	0	1	82	11th
2017	F4 British Championship	TRS Arden Junior Racing Team	29	1	0	2	6	257.5	7th
2018	F4 British Championship	JHR Developments	30	4	3	3	12	374	**2nd**
2018	BRDC British Formula 3 Championship	Chris Dittmann Racing	8	0	0	0	0	88	19th
2019	BRDC British Formula 3 Championship	Chris Dittmann Racing	24	3	3	5	10	450	**3rd**
2019	F3 Asian Championship	Pinnacle Motorsport	6	0	0	0	0	40	10th
2020	Euroformula Open Championship	Double R Racing	9	0	0	0	0	62	11th
2020	BRDC British Formula 3 Championship	Chris Dittmann Racing	4	2	2	1	2	124	17th
2020	BRDC British Formula 3 Championship	JHR Developments	3	0	0	0	2	124	17th
2021	GB3 Championship	Chris Dittmann Racing	24	4	3	1	5	381	**2nd**
2021	FIA Formula 3 Championship	Charouz Racing System	2	0	0	0	0	0	35th
2022	FIA Formula 3 Championship	Charouz Racing System	2	0	0	0	0	0	35th
2022	Euroformula Open Championship	Drivex School	9	0	0	1	2	85	10th
2023	Ultimate Cup Series - Proto P3	TS Corse	6	1	1	0	3	121.5	**3rd**
2024	Ultimate Cup Series - Proto P3	TS Corse	1	0	0	0	1	18	21st

=== Complete F4 British Championship results ===
(key) (Races in bold indicate pole position; races in italics indicate fastest lap)

Year	Team	1	2	3	4	5	6	7	8	9	10	11	12	13	14	15	16	17	18	19	20	21	22	23	24	25	26	27	28	29	30	31	DC	Points
2016	TRS Arden Junior Racing Team	BHI; 1	BHI; 2	BHI; 3	DON; 1	DON; 2	DON; 3	THR; 1; 12	THR; 2; 8	THR; 3; 17	OUL; 1; 16	OUL; 2; 12	OUL; 3; 9	CRO; 1; 11	CRO; 2; 9	CRO; 3; 14	SNE; 1; 11	SNE; 2; 16	SNE; 3; 8	KNO; 1; 10	KNO; 2; 6	KNO; 3; 12	ROC; 1; 11	ROC; 2; 6	ROC; 3; 8	SIL; 1; 7	SIL; 2; 8	SIL; 3; 9	BHGP; 1; 5	BHGP; 2; 6	BHGP; 3; 2		11th	82
2017	TRS Arden Junior Racing Team	BRI; 1; 7	BRI; 2; 1	BRI; 3; 5	DON; 1; 11	DON; 2; 6	DON; 3; 10	THR; 1; 8	THR; 2; 5	THR; 3; 12	OUL; 1 Ret	OUL; 2; 6	OUL; 3 C	CRO; 1; 6	CRO; 2 Ret	CRO; 3; 7	SNE; 1; 2	SNE; 2; 6	SNE; 3; 4	KNO; 1; 3	KNO; 2; 5	KNO; 3; 5	KNO; 4; 3	ROC; 1; 5	ROC; 2; 3	ROC; 3; 4	SIL; 1; 5	SIL; 2; 5	SIL; 3; 6	BHGP; 1; 3	BHGP; 2; 6	BHGP; 3 Ret	7th	257.5
2018	JHR Developments	**BRI**; **1**; 1	BRI; 2; 2	**BRI**; **3**; 1	DON; 1; 6	DON; 2; 2	DON; 3; 6	THR; 1; 2	THR; 2; 3	THR; 3; 2	OUL; 1; 6	OUL; 2; 1	OUL; 3; 8	CRO; 1; 5	CRO; 2 Ret	CRO; 3; 5	**SNE**; **1**; 3	SNE; 2; 3	SNE; 3; 5	ROC; 1; 4	ROC; 2 Ret	ROC; 3; 4	KNO; 1; 6	KNO; 2; 1	KNO; 3; 3	SIL; 1; 6	SIL; 2; 4	SIL; 3 Ret	BHGP; 1; 5	BHGP; 2; 5	BHGP; 3; 4		2nd	374

=== Complete BRDC British Formula 3/GB3 Championship results ===
(key) (Races in bold indicate pole position) (Races in italics indicate fastest lap)

Year	Team	1	2	3	4	5	6	7	8	9	10	11	12	13	14	15	16	17	18	19	20	21	22	23	24	Pos	Points
2018	Chris Dittmann Racing	OUL; 1	OUL; 2	OUL; 3	ROC; 1	ROC; 2	ROC; 3	SNE; 1	SNE; 2	SNE; 3	SIL; 1	SIL; 2	SIL; 3	SPA; 1; 18	SPA; 2; 4	SPA; 3 Ret	BRH; 1	BRH; 2	BRH; 3	DON; 1; 6	DON; 2; 6^{7}	DON; 3; 7	SIL; 1; 5	SIL; 2; 12	SIL; 3 C	19th	88
2019	Chris Dittmann Racing	OUL; 1; 2	OUL; 2 Ret	**OUL**; **3**; 3	SNE; 1; 5	SNE; 2; 11^{1}	SNE; 3; 4	SIL1; 1; 3	SIL1; 2; 5^{12}	SIL1; 3; 1	DON1; 1; 2	DON1; 2 DSQ	DON1; 3 Ret	**SPA**; **1**; 2	SPA; 2; 15^{2}	**SPA**; **3**; 1	BRH; 1; 11	BRH; 2; 2^{4}	BRH; 3; 6	SIL2; 1; 4	SIL2; 2; 4^{8}	SIL2; 3; 1	DON2; 1; 9	DON2; 2; 2^{5}	DON2; 3; 8	3rd	450
2020	Chris Dittmann Racing	OUL; 1	OUL; 2	OUL; 3	OUL; 4	DON1; 1	DON1; 2	DON1; 3	**BRH**; **1**; 1	BRH; 2; 15	**BRH**; **3**; 1	BRH; 4 Ret	DON2; 1	DON2; 2	DON2; 3	SNE; 1	SNE; 2	SNE; 3	SNE; 4	DON3; 1	DON3; 2	DON3; 3				17th	124
2020	JHR Developments																						SIL; 1; 2	SIL; 2; 18	SIL; 3; 3	17th	124
2021	Chris Dittmann Racing	**BRH**; **1**; 1	**BRH**; **2** Ret	BRH; 3; 13^{6}	SIL1; 1; 10	SIL1; 2; 10	SIL1; 3; 1^{3}	DON1; 1; 15	DON1; 2; 8	DON1; 3; 8	SPA; 1; 9	SPA; 2; 10	SPA; 3; 8	SNE; 1; 6	SNE; 2; 7	SNE; 3; 6^{10}	SIL2; 1; 1	**SIL2**; **2**; 1	SIL2; 3; 11^{2}	OUL; 1; 2	OUL; 2; 4	OUL; 3; 7^{7}	DON2; 1; 11	DON2; 2; 5	DON2; 3; 10^{4}	2nd	381

=== Complete F3 Asian Championship results ===
(key) (Races in bold indicate pole position) (Races in italics indicate fastest lap)

Year	Team	1	2	3	4	5	6	7	8	9	10	11	12	13	14	15	DC	Points
2019	Pinnacle Motorsport	SEP; 1	SEP; 2	SEP; 3	CHA; 1; 6	CHA; 2; 5	CHA; 3; 6	SUZ; 1	SUZ; 2	SUZ; 3	SIC1; 1 Ret	SIC1; 2; 9	SIC1; 3; 4	SIC2; 1	SIC2; 2	SIC2; 3	10th	40

=== Complete Euroformula Open Championship results ===
(key) (Races in bold indicate pole position) (Races in italics indicate fastest lap)

Year	Team	1	2	3	4	5	6	7	8	9	10	11	12	13	14	15	16	17	18	19	20	21	22	23	24	25	26	Pos	Points
2020	Double R Racing	HUN; 1; 7	HUN; 2; 7	LEC; 1; 6	LEC; 2; 7	RBR; 1; 6	RBR; 2; 7	MNZ; 1; 7	MNZ; 2; 7	MNZ; 3; 5	MUG; 1	MUG; 2	SPA; 1	SPA; 2	SPA; 3	CAT; 1	CAT; 2	CAT; 3	CAT; 4									11th	62
2022	Drivex School	EST; 1	EST; 2	EST; 3	PAU; 1	PAU; 2	LEC; 1	LEC; 2	LEC; 3	SPA; 1	SPA; 2	SPA; 3	HUN; 1; 6	HUN; 2; 3	HUN; 3; 10	IMO; 1 WD	IMO; 2 WD	IMO; 3 WD	RBR; 1; 6	RBR; 2; 7	RBR; 3; 6	MNZ; 1	MNZ; 2	MNZ; 3	CAT; 1; 4*	CAT; 2; 2	CAT; 3; 7†	10th	85

=== Complete FIA Formula 3 Championship results ===
(key) (Races in bold indicate pole position; races in italics indicate points for the fastest lap of top ten finishers)

Year	Entrant	1	2	3	4	5	6	7	8	9	10	11	12	13	14	15	16	17	18	19	20	21	DC	Points
2021	Charouz Racing System	CAT; 1	CAT; 2	CAT; 3	LEC; 1	LEC; 2	LEC; 3	RBR; 1	RBR; 2	RBR; 3	HUN; 1	HUN; 2	HUN; 3	SPA; 1	SPA; 2	SPA; 3	ZAN; 1	ZAN; 2	ZAN; 3	SOC; 1; 24	SOC; 2 C	SOC; 3; 21	35th	0
2022	Charouz Racing System	BHR; SPR; 18	BHR; FEA; 19	IMO; SPR	IMO; FEA	CAT; SPR	CAT; FEA	SIL; SPR	SIL; FEA	RBR; SPR	RBR; FEA	HUN; SPR	HUN; FEA	SPA; SPR	SPA; FEA	ZAN; SPR	ZAN; FEA	MNZ; SPR	MNZ; FEA				35th	0

=== Complete Ultimate Cup Series results ===
(key) (Races in bold indicate pole position; results in italics indicate fastest lap)

Year	Entrant	Class	Chassis	1	2	3	4	5	6	Rank	Points
2023	TS Corse	LMP3	Duqueine M30 - D08	LEC1; 2	**NAV**; 4	HOC; 7	EST; 11	MAG; 2	LEC2; 7	3rd	121.5
2024	TS Corse	LMP3	Duqueine M30 - D08	LEC1	ALG; 5	HOC	MUG	MAG	LEC2	21st	18
