= Double R Racing =

British motor racing team

(United Kingdom) Double R Racing
- Founded: 2004
- Founder(s): Kimi Räikkönen; Steve Robertson
- Base: Woking, Surrey
- Team principal(s): Anthony Hieatt
- Current series: Eurocup-3
- Former series: Euroformula Open Championship; BRDC British Formula 3 Championship; European Formula 3 Formula BMW Europe; Formula 3 Euro Series; British F3; F4 Spanish Championship; F4 British Championship; W Series
- Current drivers: Eurocup-3; 26. (United Kingdom) Tommy Harfield; 77. (United Kingdom) Bart Harrison; 91. (Angola) Lorenzo Campos
- Noted drivers: (Finland) Valtteri Bottas (United Kingdom) Kiern Jewiss (Italy) Antonio Giovinazzi (Sweden) Linus Lundqvist (Portugal) Zdeněk Chovanec (United Kingdom) Louis Foster (United Kingdom) Freddie Slater (Spain) Roberto Merhi (Indonesia) Sean Gelael (Brazil) Felipe Nasr (Brazil) Bruno Senna (Sweden) Marcus Ericsson (New Zealand) Mitch Evans (United States) Benjamin Pedersen (United Kingdom) Mike Conway (Chile) Nico Pino (Australia) Jack Doohan (United Kingdom) Stephen Jelley
- Teams' Championships: F4 British Championship: 2019
- Drivers' Championships: British Formula 3: 2006: Mike Conway; BRDC British Formula 3 Championship: 2016 Matheus Leist; 2018 Linus Lundqvist; F4 British Championship: 2018 Kiern Jewiss
- Website: https://www.doublerracing.co.uk/

Double R Racing, formerly Räikkönen Robertson Racing, is a British motor racing team founded in 2004 by then McLaren Formula One driver and future 2007 World Champion with Ferrari, Kimi Räikkönen, and his race manager Steve Robertson, a former Formula Three driver. The team currently competes in Eurocup-3. It is based in Woking, site of the McLaren manufacturing facility, and it is managed by Anthony "Boyo" Hieatt.

== History ==
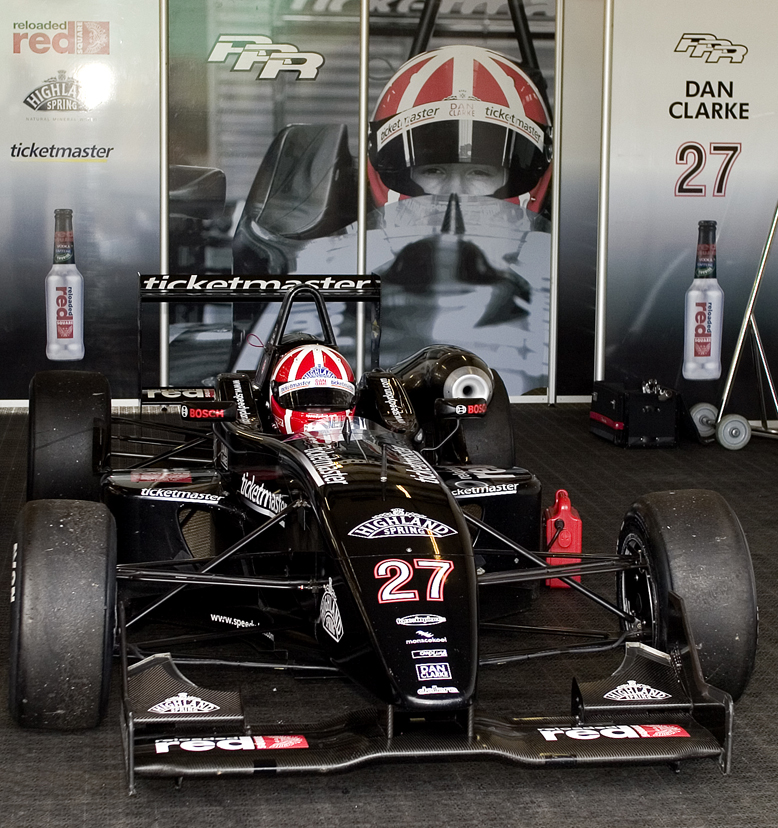
Dan Clarke prepares to race in his Dallara-Mugen-Honda during the 2005 season

When the team was announced, it was confirmed that Räikkönen Robertson would compete in the British F3 International Series, in the Championship Class (the first of two different classes) from the 2005 season. In this first season, the two Dallara F305 Mugen-Hondas were driven by British driver Dan Clarke, and Brazilian Bruno Senna. This saw the team fare well, with Clarke taking the team's maiden win at Castle Combe, as well as five other podium finishes, and going on to finish 5th in the Championship, while Senna scored three podium finishes, and finished in 10th position in the standings.

At the BP Ultimate Masters at Zandvoort, Räikkönen Robertson only entered Senna, who qualified 18th but failed to finish, while at the Macau Grand Prix, Räikkönen Robertson again only entered one car, with Clarke appearing for Formula Three Euroseries team Prema Racing, instead. Senna qualified 22nd around the tight, twisty Circuito da Guia, although he failed to finish in either the qualifying race or the Grand Prix itself.

For the 2006 season, Räikkönen Robertson changed their engine supplier to Mercedes HWA, upgraded to Dallara's F306 chassis, and replaced Champ Car-bound Clarke with Mike Conway, who finished 3rd in British F3 in 2005 and Stephen Jelley, to team up with Senna, as they looked to make a serious assault on the overall Series title.

The season started well, with Senna winning both races at Oulton Park. After winning the next race at Donington Park as well, the Brazilian had a useful lead at the championship. However a serious crash at Snetterton left the car unable to be raced in race 2 at the event and seemingly halted his progress. This coincided with a dramatic improvement in Conway's results and he overtook Senna in the race for the title. Conway continued on his way and his impressive results saw him take a seemingly unassailable lead, while Senna's inconsistent form saw slip behind Carlin's Oliver Jarvis, in the race for the runner-up's spot, despite an impressive win in the wet at Mugello. At Silverstone, Conway claimed the title with another weekend to spare. In that final weekend at Thruxton, Räikkönen Robertson also ran their fourth car (the one damaged in Senna's crash at Snetterton, now rebuilt) in the Invitation Class, a category for drivers making a guest appearance. British Porsche Carrera Cup driver Danny Watts, who had been in British F3 two years before, made a return, and won the penultimate race at Thruxton. In just their second season, Räikkönen Robertson were champions, winning thirteen races from the twenty-two that took place.

In F3's international meetings, Räikkönen Robertson had far more luck than they had in 2005. At the BP Ultimate Masters, the team entered all three drivers, qualifying 7th (Senna), 12th (Conway), and 22nd (Jelley), with Senna finishing 7th, Jelley 18th, and Conway retiring. At the Macau Grand Prix, Räikkönen Robertson only entered two cars, with Senna not being able to appear. After Conway's accident in the second qualifying session, the pair ended up in 11th (Conway) and 16th (Jelley) respectively, while in the qualifying race they finished 7th (Conway) and 13th (Jelley). In the Grand Prix itself, Conway jumped from 7th to 4th at the start and as the three cars in front him collided on the first lap, he took a lead he was never to relinquish, to become the first British winner of the Grand Prix since Darren Manning in 1999, and the first winner from the British F3 International Series since Takuma Sato in 2001. Jelley, meanwhile, finished in 11th place.

For the 2007 season, Räikkönen Robertson upgraded to Dallara's latest F307 chassis, and were again powered by the Mercedes-HWA engine. Conway and Senna made the leap to the GP2 Series, whilst Jelley continued with Räikkönen Robertson, partnered by Jonathan Kennard and Finn Atte Mustonen. Meanwhile, Räikkönen Robertson also entered a team in the National Class, their two cars being driven by British driver Alistair Jackson and Spain's Albert Costa. The team claimed 4 pole positions and won 4 races, scoring 5 fastest laps.

In January 2020, the team partnered up with Argenti Motorsport for the 2020 F4 British Championship.

Starting from 2026, Double R Racing will join the Eurocup-3.

== Success ==
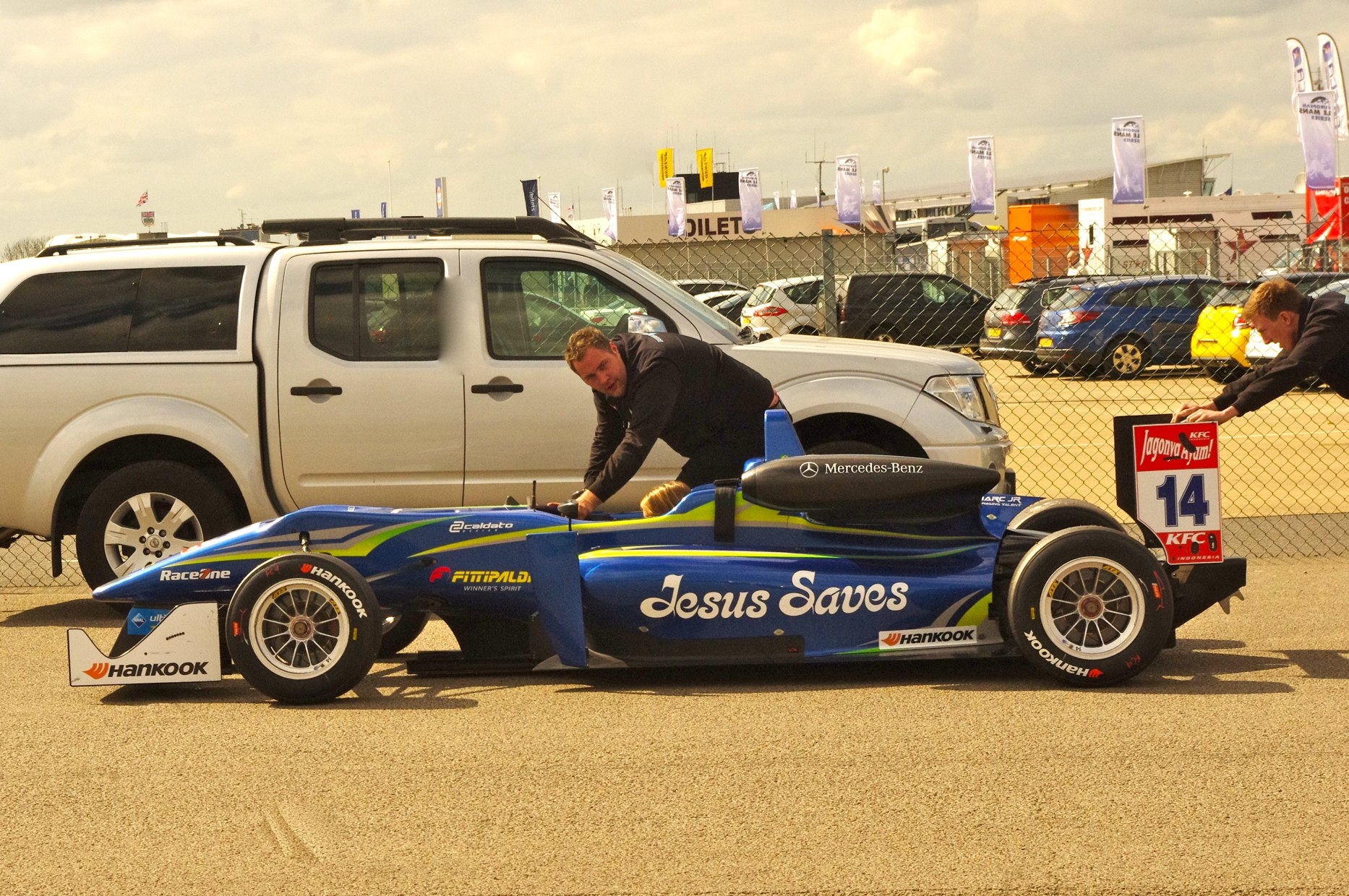
Double R Racing in 2014 Formula 3 European.

In 2008 the team won one race with Finn Atte Mustonen. The team continued with its supply of Mercedes' engines.

In 2009 the team kept the Mercedes Supply of engine. But changed the driver line-up completely by using Daisuke Nakajima and Carlos Huertas these two spent the full season with the team and Marcus Ericsson spent 6 races with the team scoring two wins and a second place. Nakajima and Ericsson both claimed one pole position each.

In 2010 the team fielded Brazilian Driver Felipe Nasr, Daisuke Nakajima and Carlos Huertas. For the first race of the season with Nakajima scoring points in the first race of the season.

For this year's 2016 season the team is contesting both the BRDC British Formula 3 Championship and the MSA Formula Championship. Finn Aleksanteri Huovinen, Brazilian Enzo Bortoleto and his compatriot Matheus Leist are competing in F3 whilst Zane Goddard from Australia and Carrie Schreiner from Germany are competing in the MSA championship.

Matheus Leist is currently lying second in the British Formula 3 Championship, just four points behind the current leader Ricky Collard with two rounds remaining to close the gap. His teammates Huovinen and Bortoleto are also inside the top ten lying tenth and eighth respectively.

In the MSA Formula Championship, Australian Zane Goddard is currently in tenth position with 102 points but is set to rise through the rankings after a sensational weekend at Croft where he achieved his maiden victory alongside 61 points over the weekend thanks to three fastest laps and two second-place finishes in the other two rounds. German Carrie Schreiner is lying in 14th position having only contested two race weekends.

== Current series results ==
=== Eurocup-3 ===
Eurocup-3 results
Year	Car	Drivers	Races	Wins	Poles	F/Laps	Podiums	Points	D.C.	T.C.
2026	Dallara 326-TOM'S	(United Kingdom) Bart Harrison	17	0	0	0	0	16	18th	7th
2026	Dallara 326-TOM'S	(Angola) Lorenzo Campos	18	0	0	0	0	0	23rd	7th
2026	Dallara 326-TOM'S	(United Kingdom) James Hedley	5	0	0	0	0	0	26th	7th
2026	Dallara 326-TOM'S	(United Kingdom) Tommy Harfield	7	0	0	0	0	0	27th	7th
2026	Dallara 326-TOM'S	(Sweden) Linus Lundqvist	3	0	0	0	0	0	34th	7th
2026	Dallara 326-TOM'S	(United Kingdom) Dayton Coulthard	2	0	0	0	0	0	NC	7th
2026	Dallara 326-TOM'S	(United Kingdom) Josh McLean	4	0	0	0	0	0	NC	7th

== Former series results ==
=== F4 British Championship ===
F4 British Championship results
Year	Car	Drivers	Races	Wins	Poles	F/Laps	Podiums	Points	D.C.	T.C.
2015	Mygale M14-F4	(Brazil) Matheus Leist	30	2	1	1	7	273	5th	3rd
2015	Mygale M14-F4	(India) Tarun Reddy	30	0	0	0	1	77	15th	3rd
2015	Mygale M14-F4	(Brazil) Gustavo Myasava	6	0	0	0	1	19	20th	3rd
2016	Mygale M14-F4	(Australia) Zane Goddard	30	4	2	4	8	239	8th	5th
2016	Mygale M14-F4	(Germany) Carrie Schreiner	12	0	0	0	0	14	17th	5th
2017	Mygale M14-F4	(Lebanon) Karl Massaad	30	0	0	0	2	83	9th	3rd
2017	Mygale M14-F4	(Sweden) Linus Lundqvist	30	5	5	9	11	306.5	5th	3rd
2017	Mygale M14-F4	(China) Daniel Cao	14	0	0	0	0	7	18th	3rd
2018	Mygale M14-F4	(Finland) Paavo Tonteri	30	1	0	1	11	266	8th	2nd
2018	Mygale M14-F4	(United Kingdom) Kiern Jewiss	30	6	2	7	16	445	1st	2nd
2018	Mygale M14-F4	(Mexico) Sebastián Álvarez	30	0	0	0	0	38	12th	2nd
2019	Mygale M14-F4	(Saudi Arabia) Reema Juffali	30	0	0	0	0	20	13th	1st
2019	Mygale M14-F4	(United Kingdom) Louis Foster	30	6	5	8	12	353	3rd	1st
2019	Mygale M14-F4	(Mexico) Sebastián Álvarez	30	5	3	5	19	407	2nd	1st
2020	Mygale M14-F4	(United Kingdom) Casper Stevenson	26	2	2	3	14	328	3rd	5th (Note: Double R Racing entered the championship through a partnership with Argenti Motorsport.)
2020	Mygale M14-F4	(Saudi Arabia) Reema Juffali	26	0	0	0	0	27	13th	5th
2020	Mygale M14-F4	(Chile) Nico Pino	12	0	0	0	0	14	14th	5th
2023	Tatuus F4-T421	(United Kingdom) Freddie Slater	6	0	0	1	0	52	17th	8th

=== Euroformula Open Championship ===
Euroformula Open Championship
Year	Car	Drivers	Races	Wins	Poles	F/Laps	Podiums	Points	D.C.	T.C.
2019	Dallara F317-Mercedes-Benz	(Australia) Jack Doohan	16	0	0	0	2	79	11th	3rd
2019	Dallara F317-Mercedes-Benz	(Sweden) Linus Lundqvist	18	0	1	1	2	144	5th	3rd
2020	Dallara 320-Mercedes-Benz	(United States) Benjamin Pedersen	3	0	0	0	0	14	15th	5th
2020	Dallara 320-Mercedes-Benz	(Germany) Matthias Lüthen	4	0	0	0	0	0	18th	5th
2020	Dallara 320-Mercedes-Benz	(United Kingdom) Ayrton Simmons	9	0	0	0	0	62	11th	5th
2020	Dallara 320-Mercedes-Benz	(United Kingdom) Louis Foster	7	1	0	0	2	57	12th	5th
2021	Dallara 320-Mercedes-Benz	(United Kingdom) Josh Mason	24	0	0	0	0	89	9th	6th
2021	Dallara 320-Mercedes-Benz	(Portugal) Zdenek Chovanec	18	0	0	0	0	33	15th	6th
2021	Dallara 320-Mercedes-Benz	(Mexico) Sebastián Álvarez	3	0	0	0	0	0	NC	6th

=== British Formula Three Championship ===
British Formula Three Championship results
Year	Car	Drivers	Races	Wins	Poles	F/Laps	Podiums	Points	D.C.
2005	Dallara F305-Mugen Honda	(United Kingdom) Dan Clarke	22	1	0	1	7	160	5th
2005	Dallara F305-Mugen Honda	(Brazil) Bruno Senna	22	0	1	0	2	75	10th
2006	Dallara F306-Mercedes HWA	(Brazil) Bruno Senna	22	5	3	5	10	229	3rd
2006	Dallara F306-Mercedes HWA	(United Kingdom) Stephen Jelley	22	0	0	2	5	126	7th
2006	Dallara F306-Mercedes HWA	(United Kingdom) Mike Conway	22	8	8	5	16	321	1st
2007	Dallara F307-Mercedes HWA	(United Kingdom) Stephen Jelley	22	2	2	1	8	183	3rd
2007	Dallara F307-Mercedes HWA	(United Kingdom) Jonathan Kennard	22	1	2	3	5	130	6th
2007	Dallara F307-Mercedes HWA	(Finland) Atte Mustonen	22	1	2	1	5	126	7th
2008	Dallara F308-Mercedes HWA	(United Kingdom) Henry Arundel	22	0	0	0	0	21	15th
2008	Dallara F308-Mercedes HWA	(Australia) John Martin	22	0	0	1	0	45	13th
2008	Dallara F308-Mercedes HWA	(United Kingdom) Alistair Jackson	16	0	0	0	0	9	17th
2008	Dallara F308-Mercedes HWA	(Brazil) Clemente de Faria Jr.	4	0	0	0	0	0	22nd
2008	Dallara F308-Mercedes HWA	(Finland) Atte Mustonen	22	1	0	0	5	138	6th
2009	Dallara F309-Mercedes HWA	(Sweden) Marcus Ericsson	6	2	1	0	4	65	11th
2009	Dallara F309-Mercedes HWA	(New Zealand) Dominic Storey	2	0	0	0	0	0	21st
2009	Dallara F309-Mercedes HWA	(Taiwan) Kevin Chen	6	0	0	0	0	2	20th
2009	Dallara F309-Mercedes HWA	(Colombia) Carlos Huertas	22	0	0	1	2	95	8th
2009	Dallara F309-Mercedes HWA	(Japan) Daisuke Nakajima	22	0	1	0	2	95	7th
2010	Dallara F308-Mercedes HWA	(Japan) Daisuke Nakajima	30	0	0	0	4	97	11th
2010	Dallara F308-Mercedes HWA	(Colombia) Carlos Huertas	30	0	0	1	4	104	10th
2010	Dallara F308-Mercedes HWA	(Brazil) Felipe Nasr	30	1	0	3	4	136	5th
2011	Dallara F308-Mercedes HWA	(Brazil) Pipo Derani	30	0	0	0	1	36	15th
2011	Dallara F308-Mercedes HWA	(Australia) Scott Pye	30	1	0	0	2	81	10th
2011	Dallara F308-Mercedes HWA	(Finland) Valtteri Bottas	3	1	0	1	1	17	17th
2011	Dallara F308-Mercedes HWA	(New Zealand) Mitch Evans	3	0	0	0	0	10	20th
2012	Dallara F312-Mercedes HWA	(Australia) Geoff Uhrhane	29	0	0	0	0	35	12th
2012	Dallara F312-Mercedes HWA	(Malaysia) Fahmi Ilyas	23	0	0	0	0	48	11th
2012	Dallara F312-Mercedes HWA	(United Kingdom) Rupert Svendsen-Cook	6	0	0	0	0	24	13th
2013	Dallara F312-Mercedes HWA	(Indonesia) Sean Gelael	12	0	0	1	3	78	8th
2013	Dallara F312-Mercedes HWA	(Italy) Antonio Giovinazzi	12	2	0	0	7	135	2nd
2013	Dallara F312-Mercedes HWA	(Colombia) Tatiana Calderón	12	0	0	0	1	79	7th
2014	Dallara F312-Mercedes HWA	(Macau) Andy Chang	12	0	0	0	4	103	6th
2014	Dallara F312-Mercedes HWA	(Spain) Roberto Merhi	3	0	0	2	2	39	11th
2014	Dallara F312-Mercedes HWA	(United Kingdom) Dan Wells	3	0	0	0	3	41	10th
2014	Dallara F312-Mercedes HWA	(United States) Camren Kaminsky	21	0	0	0	3	161	3rd
2014	Dallara F312-Mercedes HWA	(United Kingdom) Max Marshall	9	0	0	0	2	93	7th
2014	Dallara F308-Mercedes HWA	(United Kingdom) Max Marshall	9	0	0	0	2	93	7th

=== Formula 3 Euro Series ===
Formula 3 Euro Series results
Year	Car	Drivers	Races	Wins	Poles	F/Laps	Podiums	Points	D.C.	T.C.
2012	Dallara F312-Mercedes	(Australia) Geoff Uhrhane	6	0	0	0	0	0	NC‡	NC
2012	Dallara F312-Mercedes	(Malaysia) Fahmi Ilyas	6	0	0	0	0	0	NC‡	NC
2012	Dallara F308-Mugen-Honda	(Australia) Duvashen Padayachee	3	0	0	0	0	0	NC‡	NC

‡ – Guest driver – ineligible for points.

=== FIA Formula 3 European Championships ===
FIA Formula 3 European Championship results
Year	Car	Drivers	Races	Wins	Poles	F/Laps	Podiums	Points	D.C.	T.C.
2012	Dallara F312-Mercedes	(Australia) Geoff Uhrhane	8	0	0	0	0	0	NC‡	N/A
2012	Dallara F312-Mercedes	(Malaysia) Fahmi Ilyas	8	0	0	0	0	0	NC‡	N/A
2012	Dallara F308-Mugen-Honda	(Australia) Duvashen Padayachee	6	0	0	0	0	0	NC‡	N/A
2013	Dallara F312-Mercedes	(Colombia) Tatiana Calderón	30	0	0	0	0	0	32nd	9th
2013	Dallara F312-Mercedes	(Italy) Antonio Giovinazzi	29	0	0	0	0	31	17th	9th
2013	Dallara F312-Mercedes	(Indonesia) Sean Gelael	30	0	0	0	0	0	28th	9th
2014	Dallara F313-Mercedes	(Brazil) Felipe Guimarães	18	0	0	0	0	5	22nd	11th
2015	Dallara F312-Mercedes	(Germany) Nicolas Pohler	27	0	0	0	0	0	32nd	10th
2015	Dallara F312-Mercedes	(Brazil) Matheus Leist	3	0	0	0	0	0	41st	10th
2015	Dallara F313-Mercedes	(Hong Kong) Matt Solomon	33	0	0	0	0	0	28th	10th

‡ – Guest driver – ineligible for points.

=== F4 Spanish Championship ===
F4 Spanish Championship results
Year	Car	Drivers	Races	Wins	Poles	F/Laps	Podiums	Points	D.C.	T.C.
2016	Tatuus F4-T014	(Finland) Tuomas Tujula	20	1	0	1	6	189	3rd	3rd
2016	Tatuus F4-T014	(Finland) Tuomas Haapalainen	15	0	1	1	2	85	6th	3rd
2016	Tatuus F4-T014	(Finland) Juho Valtanen	6	0	0	1	3	47	11th	3rd
2016	Tatuus F4-T014	(Finland) Roope Markkanen	3	1	0	0	2	45	12th	3rd
2016	Tatuus F4-T014	(Finland) Juuso Puhakka	9	0	0	0	1	44	13th	3rd
2016	Tatuus F4-T014	(Finland) Konsta Lappalainen	5	0	0	0	0	22	15th	3rd
2016	Tatuus F4-T014	(Finland) Rasmus Markkanen	3	0	0	0	0	8	16th	3rd
2016	Tatuus F4-T014	(Finland) Elias Niskanen	3	0	0	0	0	6	17th	3rd
2016	Tatuus F4-T014	(Australia) Harry Hayek	3	0	0	0	0	0	NC	3rd

=== BRDC British Formula 3 Championship ===
BRDC British Formula 3 Championship results
Year	Car	Drivers	Races	Wins	Poles	F/Laps	Podiums	Points	D.C.
2016	Tatuus-Cosworth F4-016	(Brazil) Matheus Leist	23	4	2	6	11	493	1st
2016	Tatuus-Cosworth F4-016	(Finland) Aleksanteri Huovinen	23	0	0	0	1	245	9th
2016	Tatuus-Cosworth F4-016	(Brazil) Enzo Bortoleto	23	0	0	0	2	220	11th
2017	Tatuus-Cosworth F4-016	(Brazil) Guilherme Samaia	24	0	0	0	2	195	13th
2017	Tatuus-Cosworth F4-016	(United Kingdom) Jamie Chadwick	24	0	0	0	1	264	9th
2017	Tatuus-Cosworth F4-016	(Australia) Harry Hayek	6	0	0	0	0	51	19th
2017	Tatuus-Cosworth F4-016	(India) Krishnaraaj Mahadik	6	1	0	0	1	104	17th
2017	Tatuus-Cosworth F4-016	(Sweden) Linus Lundqvist	3	0	0	0	0	32	21st
2017	Tatuus-Cosworth F4-016	(Singapore) Pavan Ravishankar	3	0	0	0	0	31	22nd
2018	Tatuus-Cosworth F4-016	(India) Krishnaraaj Mahadik	23	0	0	0	5	358	4th
2018	Tatuus-Cosworth F4-016	(Sweden) Linus Lundqvist	23	7	3	4	13	531	1st
2018	Tatuus-Cosworth F4-016	(Singapore) Pavan Ravishankar	23	1	0	0	2	153	15th
2019	Tatuus-Cosworth F4-016	(Sweden) Hampus Ericsson	24	1	0	1	1	284	10th
2019	Tatuus-Cosworth F4-016	(United States) Neil Verhagen	24	0	1	0	7	357	5th
2019	Tatuus-Cosworth F4-016	(Singapore) Pavan Ravishankar	24	0	0	0	2	182	15th
2020	Tatuus-Cosworth BF3-020	(United States) Benjamin Pedersen	24	1	0	0	3	299	9th
2020	Tatuus-Cosworth BF3-020	(United Kingdom) Louis Foster	24	3	5	1	6	388	4th

== Timeline ==
Current series
Eurocup-3	2026–present
Former series
British Formula Three Championship	2005–2014
Formula BMW UK	2007
Formula BMW Europe	2008–2009
Formula BMW Pacific	2009
Formula 3 Euro Series	2012
FIA Formula 3 European Championship	2012–2015
F4 British Championship	2015–2020, 2023
F4 Spanish Championship	2016
BRDC British Formula 3 Championship	2016–2020
Euroformula Open Championship	2019–2021
W Series	2021–2022
