= 2019 BRDC British Formula 3 Championship =

Motor racing championship

The 2019 BRDC British Formula 3 Championship was a motor racing championship for open wheel, formula racing cars held across England, with one round in Belgium. The 2019 season was the fourth organised by the British Racing Drivers' Club in the United Kingdom. The championship featured a mix of professional motor racing teams and privately funded drivers, and also featured the 2-litre 230-bhp Tatuus-Cosworth single seat race car in the main series. The season commenced at Oulton Park on 20 April and ended on 15 September at Donington Park, after eight triple header events for a total of twenty-four races.

== Teams and drivers ==
All teams are British-registered.

Team	No.	Driver	Rounds
Fortec Motorsports	3	(United Kingdom) Johnathan Hoggard	All
Fortec Motorsports	33	(Venezuela) Manuel Maldonado	All
Fortec Motorsports	35	(United States) Kris Wright	All
Chris Dittmann Racing	7	(Malaysia) Nazim Azman	All
Chris Dittmann Racing	12	(United Kingdom) Ayrton Simmons	All
Carlin	8	(United States) Kaylen Frederick	All
Carlin	17	(France) Clément Novalak (Note: Clément Novalak is a Franco-Swiss driver who competed under a British licence.)	All
Carlin	22	(Sweden) Lucas Petersson	All
Douglas Motorsport	20	(Denmark) Benjamin Pedersen	1–7
Douglas Motorsport	55	(Belgium) Ulysse de Pauw	All
Douglas Motorsport	87	(United Kingdom) Kiern Jewiss	All
Lanan Racing	16	(Germany) Andreas Estner	3, 5
Lanan Racing	21	(United Kingdom) Joshua Mason	All
Double R Racing	24	(Sweden) Hampus Ericsson	All
Double R Racing	26	(United States) Neil Verhagen	All
Double R Racing	28	(Singapore) Pavan Ravishankar	All
Hillspeed	25	(Argentina) Nicolás Varrone	3, 5, 7
Hillspeed	79	(Thailand) Sasakorn Chaimongkol	All

- JHR Developments was announced to join the championship but did not appear at any round.

== Race calendar and results ==
The calendar was revealed on 8 November 2018. The series supports British GT at all events, excluding the 17-18 August round at Silverstone Circuit.

Round		Circuit	Date	Pole position	Fastest lap	Winning driver	Winning team
1	R1	Oulton Park (International Circuit, Cheshire)	20 April	(United States) Kaylen Frederick	(United States) Kaylen Frederick	(France) Clément Novalak	Carlin
1	R2	Oulton Park (International Circuit, Cheshire)	22 April		(United States) Kaylen Frederick	(United States) Kaylen Frederick	Carlin
1	R3	Oulton Park (International Circuit, Cheshire)	22 April	(United Kingdom) Ayrton Simmons	(United Kingdom) Johnathan Hoggard	(United Kingdom) Johnathan Hoggard	Fortec Motorsports
2	R4	Snetterton Circuit (300 Circuit, Norfolk)	18 May	(France) Clément Novalak	(United Kingdom) Johnathan Hoggard	(United Kingdom) Johnathan Hoggard	Fortec Motorsports
2	R5	Snetterton Circuit (300 Circuit, Norfolk)	19 May		(Sweden) Lucas Petersson	(Sweden) Lucas Petersson	Carlin
2	R6	Snetterton Circuit (300 Circuit, Norfolk)	19 May	(United Kingdom) Johnathan Hoggard	(United States) Kaylen Frederick	(Sweden) Hampus Ericsson	Double R Racing
3	R7	Silverstone Circuit (Grand Prix, Northamptonshire)	8 June	(United Kingdom) Clément Novalak	(United Kingdom) Ayrton Simmons	(United Kingdom) Clément Novalak	Carlin
3	R8	Silverstone Circuit (Grand Prix, Northamptonshire)	9 June		(United Kingdom) Johnathan Hoggard	(Denmark) Benjamin Pedersen	Douglas Motorsport
3	R9	Silverstone Circuit (Grand Prix, Northamptonshire)	9 June	(United States) Neil Verhagen	(United Kingdom) Ayrton Simmons	(United Kingdom) Ayrton Simmons	Chris Dittmann Racing
4	R10	Donington Park (Grand Prix Circuit, Leicestershire)	22 June	(United Kingdom) Johnathan Hoggard	(United Kingdom) Johnathan Hoggard	(United Kingdom) Johnathan Hoggard	Fortec Motorsports
4	R11	Donington Park (Grand Prix Circuit, Leicestershire)	23 June		(France) Clément Novalak	(United Kingdom) Joshua Mason	Lanan Racing
4	R12	Donington Park (Grand Prix Circuit, Leicestershire)	23 June	(United Kingdom) Johnathan Hoggard	(United Kingdom) Johnathan Hoggard	(United Kingdom) Johnathan Hoggard	Fortec Motorsports
5	R13	Spa-Francorchamps (Belgium)	20 July	(United Kingdom) Ayrton Simmons	(Sweden) Hampus Ericsson	(United States) Kaylen Frederick	Carlin
5	R14	Spa-Francorchamps (Belgium)	21 July		(Thailand) Sasakorn Chaimongkol	(Argentina) Nicolás Varrone	Hillspeed
5	R15	Spa-Francorchamps (Belgium)	21 July	(United Kingdom) Ayrton Simmons	(United Kingdom) Kiern Jewiss	(United Kingdom) Ayrton Simmons	Chris Dittmann Racing
6	R16	Brands Hatch (Grand Prix Circuit, Kent)	3 August	(United Kingdom) Johnathan Hoggard	(United Kingdom) Johnathan Hoggard	(United Kingdom) Johnathan Hoggard	Fortec Motorsports
6	R17	Brands Hatch (Grand Prix Circuit, Kent)	4 August		(United Kingdom) Ayrton Simmons	(Malaysia) Nazim Azman	Chris Dittmann Racing
6	R18	Brands Hatch (Grand Prix Circuit, Kent)	4 August	(United Kingdom) Johnathan Hoggard	(United Kingdom) Johnathan Hoggard	(United Kingdom) Kiern Jewiss	Douglas Motorsport
7	R19	Silverstone Circuit (Grand Prix, Northamptonshire)	17 August	(United Kingdom) Kiern Jewiss	(Venezuela) Manuel Maldonado	(Thailand) Sasakorn Chaimongkol	Hillspeed
7	R20	Silverstone Circuit (Grand Prix, Northamptonshire)	18 August		(United Kingdom) Ayrton Simmons	(Venezuela) Manuel Maldonado	Fortec Motorsports
7	R21	Silverstone Circuit (Grand Prix, Northamptonshire)	18 August	(United Kingdom) Kiern Jewiss	(United Kingdom) Ayrton Simmons	(United Kingdom) Ayrton Simmons	Chris Dittmann Racing
8	R22	Donington Park (Grand Prix Circuit, Leicestershire)	14 September	(United Kingdom) Johnathan Hoggard	(United Kingdom) Johnathan Hoggard	(United Kingdom) Johnathan Hoggard	Fortec Motorsports
8	R23	Donington Park (Grand Prix Circuit, Leicestershire)	15 September		(United Kingdom) Johnathan Hoggard	(Malaysia) Nazim Azman	Chris Dittmann Racing
8	R24	Donington Park (Grand Prix Circuit, Leicestershire)	15 September	(United Kingdom) Johnathan Hoggard	(United Kingdom) Kiern Jewiss	(United Kingdom) Johnathan Hoggard	Fortec Motorsports

== Championship standings ==
Scoring system

Points were awarded to the top 20 classified finishers in races one and three, with the second race awarding points to only the top 15. Race two, which reversed the order of the race one finishers, providing they set a lap time within 103% of the fastest driver, will be awarded extra points for positions gained from drivers' respective starting positions.

Races	Position, points per race																			
Races	1st	2nd	3rd	4th	5th	6th	7th	8th	9th	10th	11th	12th	13th	14th	15th	16th	17th	18th	19th	20th
Races 1 & 3	35	29	24	21	19	17	15	13	12	11	10	9	8	7	6	5	4	3	2	1
Race 2	20	17	15	13	11	10	9	8	7	6	5	4	3	2	1					

Notes

- ^{1} ^{2} ^{3} refers to positions gained and thus extra points earned during race two.

=== Drivers' championship ===
Pos	Driver	OUL			SNE			SIL1			DON1			SPA			BRH			SIL2			DON2			Pts
Pos	Driver	R1	R2	R3	R1	R2	R3	R1	R2	R3	R1	R2	R3	R1	R2	R3	R1	R2	R3	R1	R2	R3	R1	R2	R3	Pts
1	(France) Clément Novalak	1	6^{7}	2	**2**	6^{9}	2	**1**	9^{9}	6	4	4^{7}	4	4	10^{5}	2	3	9^{5}	4	7	3^{6}	4	4	12	6	505
2	(United Kingdom) Johnathan Hoggard	3	8^{3}	1	1	8^{8}	**Ret**	8	2^{10}	2	**1**	Ret	**1**	8	7^{4}	13	**1**	12^{4}	**2**	3	14	5	**1**	15	**1**	482
3	(United Kingdom) Ayrton Simmons	2	Ret	**3**	5	11^{1}	4	3	5^{12}	1	2	DSQ	Ret	**2**	15^{2}	**1**	11	2^{4}	6	4	4^{8}	1	9	2^{5}	8	450
4	(United Kingdom) Kiern Jewiss	9	4^{1}	4	3	13^{1}	Ret	9	16	4	3	10^{2}	6	5	8^{6}	3	2	11^{4}	1	**2**	8^{7}	**2**	2	5^{9}	2	438
5	(United States) Neil Verhagen	12	2	5	6	3^{8}	Ret	2	15^{1}	**5**	6	8^{1}	7	18	3	5	8	4^{5}	7	10	15	3	7	3^{6}	3	357
6	(Venezuela) Manuel Maldonado	8	3^{3}	8	8	9	5	5	10^{4}	8	7	3^{5}	9	3	11^{5}	6	6	7^{4}	Ret	16	1	11	3	7^{6}	4	348
7	(Belgium) Ulysse de Pauw	4	7^{3}	6	11	15	7	7	8^{2}	11	5	7^{3}	2	7	9^{3}	18	7	6^{4}	3	5	6^{5}	7	5	9^{2}	Ret	329
8	(Thailand) Sasakorn Chaimongkol	5	13	7	9	14	12	6	13	7	11	9	3	9	12	12	4	10^{3}	8	1	9^{7}	17	6	4^{6}	5	314
9	(United States) Kaylen Frederick	**13**	1	12	7	4^{6}	3	4	12^{3}	3	10	Ret	Ret	1	Ret	16	5	Ret	5	6	13	10	8	8	7	305
10	(Sweden) Hampus Ericsson	6	14	13	4	7^{6}	1	14	Ret	9	8	6^{1}	8	6	14	4	12	5	10	9	Ret	6	10	10	9	284
11	(Malaysia) Nazim Azman	7	9	11	13	5	6	10	6^{2}	16	12	11	5	16	16	14	14	1^{2}	12	15	12	12	14	1^{1}	11	236
12	(United Kingdom) Joshua Mason	10	5	14	14	Ret	9	12	7	12	13	1^{2}	12	14	2^{3}	9	13	3^{1}	11	11	Ret	9	12	13	13	229
13	(Sweden) Lucas Petersson	Ret	11^{5}	9	16	1	DSQ	11	11	17	Ret	12^{4}	13	10	13	7	9	8	9	8	11	8	11	6	10	206
14	(Denmark) Benjamin Pedersen	Ret	10^{5}	10	10	2^{5}	8	18	1	10	9	5^{1}	10	12	6^{1}	17	10	13	14	Ret	10^{7}	16				200
15	(Singapore) Pavan Ravishankar	Ret	12	15	12	10	11	16	3	13	15	2	11	17	4	10	15	Ret	15	12	7	14	13	14	12	182
16	(United States) Kris Wright	11	Ret	16	15	12	10	13	17	18	14	13	Ret	13	17	15	16	Ret	13	14	5	15	15	11	14	126
17	(Argentina) Nicolás Varrone							17	4	14				11	1^{7}	8				13	2^{2}	13				109
18	(Germany) Andreas Estner							15	14	15				15	5	11										41
Pos	Driver	R1	R2	R3	R1	R2	R3	R1	R2	R3	R1	R2	R3	R1	R2	R3	R1	R2	R3	R1	R2	R3	R1	R2	R3	Pts
Pos	Driver	OUL			SNE			SIL1			DON1			SPA			BRH			SIL2			DON2			Pts

Colour	Result
Gold	Winner
Silver	Second place
Bronze	Third place
Green	Points classification
Blue	Non-points classification
Blue	Non-classified finish (NC)
Purple	Retired, not classified (Ret)
Red	Did not qualify (DNQ)
Red	Did not pre-qualify (DNPQ)
Black	Disqualified (DSQ)
White	Did not start (DNS)
White	Withdrew (WD)
White	Race cancelled (C)
Blank	Did not practice (DNP)
Blank	Did not arrive (DNA)
Blank	Excluded (EX)

**Bold** – Pole
Italics – Fastest Lap
