= Chris Dittmann Racing =

British motor racing team

(United Kingdom) Chris Dittmann Racing
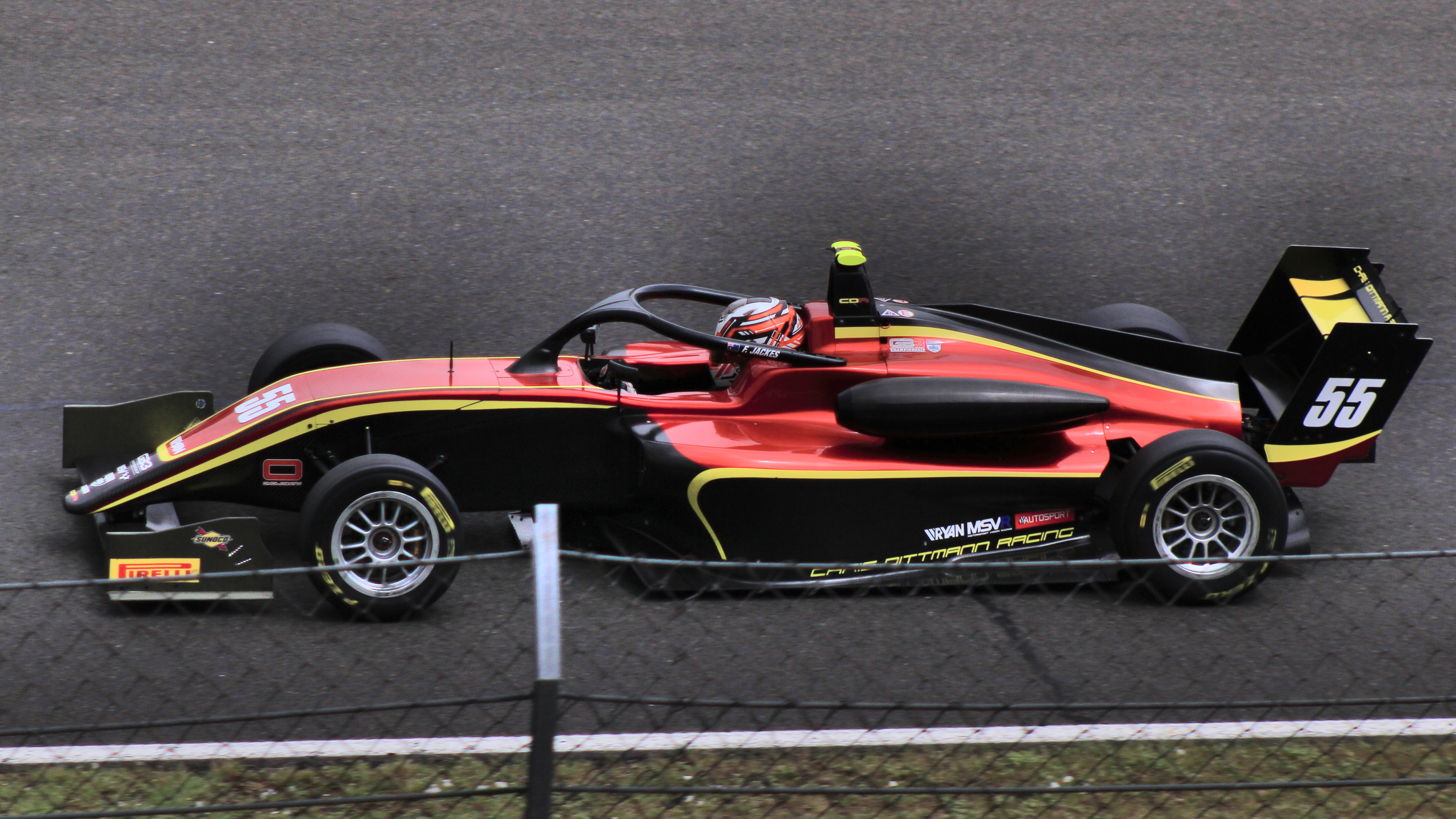
- Founded: 2010
- Folded: 2026
- Base: Tewkesbury, Gloucestershire
- Team principal(s): Chris Dittmann
- Founder(s): Chris Dittmann
- Former series: GB3 Championship; F4 British Championship; MSV F3 Cup; Ginetta G50 Cup; Remus F3 Cup
- Current drivers: F4 British Championship: 13. (United States) Henry Mercier; 14. (Denmark) Alba Hurup Larsen; 21. (United Kingdom) Tommy Harfield; 40. (Poland) Piotr Orzechowski; 43. (United Kingdom) Daniella Sutton; 57. (Canada) Autumn Fisher
- Teams' Championships: MSV F3 Cup: 2015, 2018
- Drivers' Championships: MSV F3 Cup: 2012 (Chris Dittmann)
- Website: www.chrisdittmannracing.co.uk

Chris Dittmann Racing (CDR) was a British auto racing team. Based in Tewkesbury, Gloucestershire, United Kingdom, the team was founded in 2010 by racing driver Chris Dittmann and so-named after him. It formerly competed in multiple auto racing series, including GB3 Championship, F4 British Championship, MotorSport Vision Formula Three Cup and Ginetta G50 Cup. In November 2026, LN4 Fusion, a junior single-seater team co-founded by Formula One driver Lando Norris, acquired majority stake in the team.

Notable past drivers for the team include Ayrton Simmons, McKenzy Cresswell, Martinius Stenshorne, Alice Powell and Nicolás Varrone.

== Chris Dittmann ==
Chris Dittmann (born 2 July 1989) is the founder of Chris Dittmann Racing. A mechanical engineer and former racing driver, he formerly competed in Formula Renault BARC Championship for Hillspeed in 2007 and also raced in Ginetta G50 Cup between 2008 and 2010.

== History ==
=== Early years and success in MSV F3 Cup ===
The team was founded in 2010 by Chris Dittmann. In 2012, Chris Dittmann Racing expanded to MSV F3 Cup. The founder, Chris Dittmann, won the first driver' title. CDR won its first ever teams' title in the MSV F3 Cup in 2015, and later, a second teams' title in 2018.

=== GB3 Championship ===
==== 2013–2016 ====
In 2013 the team expanded to GB3 Championship (then BRDC Formula 4), but only contested five rounds, with Luke Williams, Max Cornelius and Dylon Phibbs driving for the team.

Tom Jackson, Tom Bale and Piers Hickin were signed for CDR in the 2014 BRDC Formula 4 Championship.

In 2015, the team signed Omar Ismail, Paul Sieljes and Michael O'Brien, while retaining Tom Jackson for the 2015 BRDC F4.

In the 2016 season of the newly-renamed BRDC F3, Chris Dittmann Racing signed Jeremy Wahome, Krishnaraaj Mahadik and Quinlan Lall. However, Paul Sieljes replaced Mahadik in the first round, while Omar Ismail also representing the team in the final round.

==== 2017–2021 ====
For the 2017 season, Jeremy Wahome and Omar Ismail remained with the team. CDR also signed a new driver, Tristan Charpentier.

Throughout the 2018 season, CDR signed Harry Webb, Chia Wing Hoong, Ayrton Simmons and Cian Carey.

In 2019, the team fielded two cars for Ayrton Simmons and Nazim Azman.

For the 2020 BRDC F3 season, Chris Dittmann Racing signed five drivers throughout the season: Nicolás Varrone, Josh Skelton, Max Marzorati (switched from JHR Developments in mid-season), Ayrton Simmons and Alex Fores.

2021 saw the team fielded cars for four drivers competing in GB3, with returnees Ayrton Simmons, Max Marzorati and Alex Fores, as well as a newly-signed driver, Branden Lee Oxley.

==== 2022–2025 ====
For the 2022 season, Chris Dittmann Racing remanined with Branden Lee Oxley and signed McKenzy Cresswell, while Ayrton Ori and Zak Taylor joined the team mid-season.

In 2023, Chris Dittmann Racing signed Arthur Rogeon and Zak Taylor. Later, Jack Sherwood was promoted from CDR's British F4 outfit to its GB3 squad.

2024 saw the team signed Sebastian Murray and Flynn Jackes as its two full-time entries. Chris Dittmann Racing also fielded seven one- or two-race entries in this season: Rishab Jain, Martinius Stenshorne, Kanato Le, Javier Sagrera (replacing a signed but not raced one-off driver, Isaac Barashi), Jacob Douglas and Tom Mills.

While the team signed Rashid Al Dhaheri for a part-time entry but did not race for the team in 2025, CDR scaled back its GB3 program to part-time, with Divy Nandan, Nicolas Stati and Rodrigo González driving for the team for the first and fifth rounds.

The official website of GB3 did not list Chris Dittmann Racing as an team entrant for 2026 season, suggesting the team's withdrawal from GB3.

=== F4 British Championship ===
In September 2021, the team announced expansion to F4 British Championship from 2022.

In 2023, a CDR driver, Gustav Jonsson, won the Rookie Cup. Two years later, the team achieved its first ever race win in British F4 with Tommy Harfield.

In November 2026, it was announced that LN4 Fusion, a junior formulae team co-founded by Formula One driver Lando Norris, had acquired a majority stake in Chris Dittmann Racing. Under the new arrangement, LN4 Fusion secured the CDR's British F4 entry from 2027 as a four-car entrant, and Chris Dittmann remained his position as the team principal for LN4 Fusion's British F4 operations.

=== Other racing ===
Chris Dittmann Racing competed in 2010 Ginetta G50 Cup, with their drivers including Alice Powell. The team also participated in 2017 Remus F3 Cup, fielding a car for Peter Venn at the Spa round.

== Former series results ==
=== F4 British Championship ===
| Year | Car | Drivers | Races | Wins | Poles | F/Laps | Podiums | Points | D.C. | T.C. |
|---|---|---|---|---|---|---|---|---|---|---|
| 2022 | Tatuus F4-T421 | (United Kingdom) Joel Pearson | 15 | 0 | 0 | 0 | 0 | 30 | 16th | 6th |
| 2022 | Tatuus F4-T421 | (United Kingdom) Jack Sherwood | 12 | 0 | 0 | 0 | 0 | 14 | 18th | 6th |
| 2022 | Tatuus F4-T421 | (India) Jaden Pariat | 6 | 0 | 0 | 0 | 0 | 13 | 19th | 6th |
| 2022 | Tatuus F4-T421 | (India) Divy Nandan | 6 | 0 | 0 | 0 | 0 | 2 | 21st | 6th |
| 2023 | Tatuus F4-T421 | (Sweden) Gustav Jonsson | 30 | 0 | 0 | 1 | 2 | 133 | 11th | 5th |
| 2023 | Tatuus F4-T421 | (United Kingdom) Daniel Guinchard | 17 | 0 | 0 | 1 | 3 | 95 | 13th | 5th |
| 2023 | Tatuus F4-T421 | (United Kingdom) Jack Sherwood | 30 | 0 | 0 | 0 | 3 | 89 | 15th | 5th |
| 2024 | Tatuus F4-T421 | (United Kingdom) Bart Harrison | 27 | 0 | 0 | 0 | 0 | 24 | 20th | 7th |
| 2024 | Tatuus F4-T421 | (Sweden) Gustav Jonsson | 2 | 0 | 0 | 0 | 0 | 16 | 23rd | 7th |
| 2024 | Tatuus F4-T421 | (Germany) Carrie Schreiner | 6 | 0 | 0 | 0 | 0 | 8 | 27th | 7th |
| 2024 | Tatuus F4-T421 | (United Kingdom) Jessica Edgar | 3 | 0 | 0 | 0 | 0 | 8 | 28th | 7th |
| 2025 | Tatuus F4-T421 | (United Kingdom) Tommy Harfield | 30 | 3 | 2 | 4 | 8 | 246 | 4th | 6th |
| 2025 | Tatuus F4-T421 | (United Kingdom) Charlie Edge | 21 | 0 | 0 | 0 | 0 | 34 | 22nd | 6th |
| 2025 | Tatuus F4-T421 | (Denmark) Alba Hurup Larsen | 21 | 0 | 0 | 0 | 0 | 27 | 23rd | 6th |
| 2025 | Tatuus F4-T421 | (Poland) Piotr Orzechowski | 9 | 0 | 0 | 0 | 0 | 6 | 33rd | 6th |
| 2026 | Tatuus F4-T421 | (United Kingdom) Tommy Harfield | 30 | 1 | 2 | 2 | 4 | 131 | 9th | 7th |
| 2026 | Tatuus F4-T421 | (United States) Henry Mercier | 26 | 0 | 0 | 0 | 0 | 36 | 21st | 7th |
| 2026 | Tatuus F4-T421 | (United Kingdom) Daniella Sutton | 30 | 0 | 0 | 0 | 0 | 36 | 22nd | 7th |
| 2026 | Tatuus F4-T421 | (Poland) Piotr Orzechowski | 21 | 0 | 0 | 0 | 0 | 15 | 29th | 7th |
| 2026 | Tatuus F4-T421 | (Denmark) Alba Hurup Larsen | 6 | 0 | 0 | 0 | 1 | 9 | 32nd | 7th |
| 2026 | Tatuus F4-T421 | (United States) Alexander Vanchev | 3 | 0 | 0 | 0 | 0 | 7 | 35th | 7th |
| 2026 | Tatuus F4-T421 | (Canada) Autumn Fisher | 3 | 0 | 0 | 0 | 0 | 2 | 42nd | 7th |

=== BRDC Formula 4 Championship / BRDC British Formula 3 Championship / GB3 Championship ===
| Year | Car | Drivers | Races | Wins | Poles | F/Laps | Podiums | Points | D.C. | T.C. |
|---|---|---|---|---|---|---|---|---|---|---|
| 2013 | Ralph Firman Racing-Duratec MSV F4-013 | (United Kingdom) Luke Williams | 9 | 0 | 0 | 0 | 0 | 41 | 22nd | N/A |
| 2013 | Ralph Firman Racing-Duratec MSV F4-013 | (United Kingdom) Max Cornelius | 3 | 0 | 0 | 0 | 0 | 18 | 24th | N/A |
| 2013 | Ralph Firman Racing-Duratec MSV F4-013 | (Republic of Ireland) Dylon Phibbs | 3 | 0 | 0 | 0 | 0 | 6 | 26th | N/A |
| 2014 | Ralph Firman Racing-Duratec MSV F4-013 | (United Kingdom) Tom Jackson | 18 | 0 | 0 | 0 | 0 | 136 | 15th | N/A |
| 2014 | Ralph Firman Racing-Duratec MSV F4-013 | (United Kingdom) Tom Bale | 15 | 0 | 0 | 0 | 0 | 69 | 21st | N/A |
| 2014 | Ralph Firman Racing-Duratec MSV F4-013 | (United Kingdom) Piers Hickin | 3 | 0 | 0 | 0 | 0 | 22 | 26th | N/A |
| 2015 | Ralph Firman Racing-Duratec MSV F4-013 | (United Kingdom) Tom Jackson | 24 | 2 | 0 | 2 | 9 | 420 | 3rd | N/A |
| 2015 | Ralph Firman Racing-Duratec MSV F4-013 | (United Kingdom) Michael O'Brien† | 18 | 1 | 0 | 0 | 1 | 150 | 7th | N/A |
| 2015 | Ralph Firman Racing-Duratec MSV F4-013 | (United Kingdom) Omar Ismail | 18 | 1 | 1 | 0 | 2 | 260 | 9th | N/A |
| 2015 | Ralph Firman Racing-Duratec MSV F4-013 | (Netherlands) Paul Sieljes | 3 | 0 | 0 | 0 | 0 | 34 | 22nd | N/A |
| 2016 | Tatuus-Cosworth F4-016 | (United States) Quinlan Lall | 20 | 0 | 0 | 0 | 0 | 149 | 15th | N/A |
| 2016 | Tatuus-Cosworth F4-016 | (India) Krishnaraaj Mahadik | 16 | 0 | 0 | 0 | 0 | 103 | 20th | N/A |
| 2016 | Tatuus-Cosworth F4-016 | (Kenya) Jeremy Wahome | 22 | 0 | 0 | 0 | 0 | 98 | 21st | N/A |
| 2016 | Tatuus-Cosworth F4-016 | (United Kingdom) Omar Ismail† | 6 | 0 | 0 | 0 | 0 | 47 | 24th | N/A |
| 2016 | Tatuus-Cosworth F4-016 | (Netherlands) Paul Sieljes | 3 | 0 | 0 | 0 | 0 | 10 | 28th | N/A |
| 2017 | Tatuus-Cosworth F4-016 | (United Kingdom) Omar Ismail | 21 | 0 | 0 | 0 | 1 | 216 | 11th | N/A |
| 2017 | Tatuus-Cosworth F4-016 | (Kenya) Jeremy Wahome | 21 | 0 | 0 | 0 | 0 | 165 | 14th | N/A |
| 2017 | Tatuus-Cosworth F4-016 | (France) Tristan Charpentier | 5 | 0 | 0 | 0 | 0 | 53 | 18th | N/A |
| 2018 | Tatuus-Cosworth F4-016 | (United Kingdom) Ayrton Simmons | 8 | 0 | 0 | 0 | 0 | 88 | 19th | N/A |
| 2018 | Tatuus-Cosworth F4-016 | (United Kingdom) Harry Webb | 3 | 0 | 0 | 0 | 0 | 45 | 22nd | N/A |
| 2018 | Tatuus-Cosworth F4-016 | (Malaysia) Chia Wing Hoong | 6 | 0 | 0 | 0 | 0 | 22 | 24th | N/A |
| 2018 | Tatuus-Cosworth F4-016 | (Republic of Ireland) Cian Carey | 3 | 0 | 0 | 0 | 0 | 30 | 25th | N/A |
| 2019 | Tatuus-Cosworth F4-016 | (United Kingdom) Ayrton Simmons | 23 | 3 | 3 | 5 | 10 | 450 | 3rd | N/A |
| 2019 | Tatuus-Cosworth F4-016 | (Malaysia) Nazim Azman | 24 | 2 | 0 | 0 | 2 | 236 | 11th | N/A |
| 2020 | Tatuus-Cosworth F4-016 | (United Kingdom) Josh Skelton | 24 | 0 | 0 | 0 | 3 | 320 | 6th | N/A |
| 2020 | Tatuus-Cosworth F4-016 | (United Kingdom) Ayrton Simmons† | 7 | 2 | 2 | 1 | 4 | 124 | 17th | N/A |
| 2020 | Tatuus-Cosworth F4-016 | (Argentina) Nicolás Varrone | 7 | 0 | 0 | 0 | 0 | 58 | 20th | N/A |
| 2020 | Tatuus-Cosworth F4-016 | (United Kingdom) Max Marzorati† | 13 | 0 | 0 | 0 | 0 | 55 | 21st | N/A |
| 2020 | Tatuus-Cosworth F4-016 | (United Kingdom) Alex Fores | 7 | 0 | 0 | 0 | 0 | 24 | 22nd | N/A |
| 2021 | Tatuus-Cosworth F4-016 | (United Kingdom) Ayrton Simmons | 24 | 4 | 3 | 1 | 5 | 381 | 2nd | 6th |
| 2021 | Tatuus-Cosworth F4-016 | (United Kingdom) Branden Lee Oxley | 12 | 0 | 0 | 0 | 0 | 126 | 16th | 6th |
| 2021 | Tatuus-Cosworth F4-016 | (United Kingdom) Max Marzorati | 12 | 0 | 0 | 0 | 1 | 78 | 20th | 6th |
| 2021 | Tatuus-Cosworth F4-016 | (United Kingdom) Alex Fores | 5 | 0 | 0 | 0 | 1 | 37 | 23rd | 6th |
| 2022 | Tatuus-Cosworth MSV-022 | (United Kingdom) McKenzy Cresswell | 23 | 0 | 0 | 0 | 1 | 221 | 11th | 7th |
| 2022 | Tatuus-Cosworth MSV-022 | (United Kingdom) Branden Lee Oxley | 21 | 1 | 0 | 0 | 3 | 163 | 15th | 7th |
| 2022 | Tatuus-Cosworth MSV-022 | (United Kingdom) Zak Taylor† | 24 | 0 | 0 | 0 | 1 | 154.5 | 18th | 7th |
| 2022 | Tatuus-Cosworth MSV-022 | (United States) Ayrton Ori | 3 | 0 | 0 | 0 | 0 | 0 | 24th | 7th |
| 2023 | Tatuus-Cosworth MSV-022 | (United Kingdom) Zak Taylor | 20 | 0 | 0 | 0 | 0 | 153 | 14th | 8th |
| 2023 | Tatuus-Cosworth MSV-022 | (France) Arthur Rogeon | 23 | 0 | 0 | 0 | 3 | 123 | 21st | 8th |
| 2023 | Tatuus-Cosworth MSV-022 | (United Kingdom) Jack Sherwood | 3 | 0 | 0 | 0 | 0 | 1 | 27th | 8th |
| 2024 | Tatuus-Cosworth MSV-022 | (United Kingdom) James Hedley† | 14 | 0 | 0 | 0 | 2 | 151 | 15th | 7th |
| 2024 | Tatuus-Cosworth MSV-022 | (United Kingdom) Sebastian Murray | 23 | 0 | 0 | 0 | 0 | 111 | 18th | 7th |
| 2024 | Tatuus-Cosworth MSV-022 | (Philippines) Flynn Jackes | 17 | 0 | 0 | 0 | 0 | 75 | 21st | 7th |
| 2024 | Tatuus-Cosworth MSV-022 | (Japan) Kanato Le | 3 | 0 | 0 | 0 | 0 | 46 | 23rd | 7th |
| 2024 | Tatuus-Cosworth MSV-022 | (Norway) Martinius Stenshorne | 2 | 0 | 0 | 0 | 0 | 19 | 27th | 7th |
| 2024 | Tatuus-Cosworth MSV-022 | (New Zealand) Jacob Douglas | 6 | 0 | 0 | 0 | 0 | 18 | 28th | 7th |
| 2024 | Tatuus-Cosworth MSV-022 | (United Kingdom) Tom Mills | 3 | 0 | 0 | 0 | 0 | 17 | 29th | 7th |
| 2024 | Tatuus-Cosworth MSV-022 | (Spain) Javier Sagrera | 3 | 0 | 0 | 0 | 0 | 10 | 31st | 7th |
| 2024 | Tatuus-Cosworth MSV-022 | (Singapore) Rishab Jain | 3 | 0 | 0 | 0 | 0 | 4 | 33rd | 7th |
| 2025 | Tatuus-Cosworth MSV-025 | (Mexico) Rodrigo González† | 12 | 0 | 0 | 0 | 0 | 41 | 23rd | 11th |
| 2025 | Tatuus-Cosworth MSV-025 | (India) Divy Nandan† | 12 | 0 | 0 | 0 | 0 | 33 | 29th | 11th |
| 2025 | Tatuus-Cosworth MSV-025 | (Australia) Nicolas Stati | 3 | 0 | 0 | 0 | 0 | 5 | 35th | 11th |

† Shared results with other teams.

=== Ginetta G50 Cup ===
| Year | Car | Drivers | Races | Wins | Poles | F/Laps | Podiums | Points | D.C. |
|---|---|---|---|---|---|---|---|---|---|
| 2010 | Ginetta G50 | (United Kingdom) Mark Davies† | 28 | 0 | 0 | 1 | 0 | 299 | 8th |
| 2010 | Ginetta G50 | (United Kingdom) Chris Dittmann | 19 | 0 | 2 | 1 | 5 | 288 | 10th |
| 2010 | Ginetta G50 | (United Kingdom) Alice Powell‡ | 17 | 0 | 0 | 0 | 0 | 163 | 16th |

† Davies drove for Optimum until round 8.

‡ Powell drove for Tockwith until round 5.

=== Remus F3 Cup ===
| Year | Car | Drivers | Races | Wins | Poles | F/Laps | Podiums | Points | D.C. |
|---|---|---|---|---|---|---|---|---|---|
| 2017 | Dallara F308 | (United Kingdom) Peter Venn | 2 | 0 | 0 | 0 | 0 | 10 | 20th |

== Timeline ==
Former series
| Ginetta G50 Cup | 2010 |
| MSV F3 Cup | 2011–2012, 2015, 2017–2019 |
| GB3 Championship | 2013–2025 |
| Remus F3 Cup | 2017 |
| F4 British Championship | 2022–2026 |
