= 2018 F4 British Championship =

The 2018 F4 British Championship was a multi-event, Formula 4 open-wheel single seater motor racing championship held across United Kingdom. The championship featured a mix of professional motor racing teams and privately funded drivers, competing in Formula 4 cars that conformed to the technical regulations for the championship. This, the fourth season, following on from the British Formula Ford Championship, was the fourth year that the cars conformed to the FIA's Formula 4 regulations. Part of the TOCA tour, it formed part of the extensive program of support categories built up around the BTCC centrepiece.

The season commenced on 7 April at Brands Hatch – on the circuit's Indy configuration – and concluded on 30 September at the same venue, utilising the Grand Prix circuit, after thirty races held at ten meetings, all in support of the 2018 British Touring Car Championship.

== Teams and drivers ==
All teams were British-registered.

Team	No.	Drivers	Class	Rounds
Fortec Motorsports	3	(United Kingdom) Johnathan Hoggard		All
Fortec Motorsports	18	(Sweden) Hampus Ericsson		1–7
Fortec Motorsports	29	(Republic of Ireland) Lucca Allen		1–7, 9–10
TRS Arden Junior Racing Team	5	(Finland) Patrik Pasma		All
TRS Arden Junior Racing Team	11	(United Kingdom) Sebastian Priaulx		All
TRS Arden Junior Racing Team	24	(Norway) Dennis Hauger	R	All
TRS Arden Junior Racing Team	33	(Australia) Jack Doohan	R	All
Double R Racing	10	(Finland) Paavo Tonteri	R	All
Double R Racing	26	(United Kingdom) Kiern Jewiss		All
Double R Racing	94	(Mexico) Sebastián Álvarez	R	All
JHR Developments	12	(United Kingdom) Ayrton Simmons		All
JHR Developments	22	(Mexico) Manuel Sulaimán		All
JHR Developments	43	(United Kingdom) Josh Skelton	R	All
Rosso/Verde Scorpio Motorsport	21	(United Kingdom) Christian Lester	R	9
Sharp Motorsport	89	(United Kingdom) Jamie Sharp		All

Icon	Class
R	Rookie

== Race calendar ==
The calendar was announced on 5 June 2017. All races were held in the United Kingdom.

Round		Circuit	Date	Pole position	Fastest lap	Winning driver	Winning team	Rookie winner
1	R1	Brands Hatch (Indy Circuit, Kent)	7 April	(United Kingdom) Ayrton Simmons	(United Kingdom) Ayrton Simmons	(United Kingdom) Ayrton Simmons	JHR Developments	(Norway) Dennis Hauger
1	R2	Brands Hatch (Indy Circuit, Kent)	7 April		(United Kingdom) Johnathan Hoggard	(United Kingdom) Sebastian Priaulx	TRS Arden Junior Racing Team	(Australia) Jack Doohan
1	R3	Brands Hatch (Indy Circuit, Kent)	8 April	(United Kingdom) Ayrton Simmons	(United Kingdom) Ayrton Simmons	(United Kingdom) Ayrton Simmons	JHR Developments	(Finland) Paavo Tonteri
2	R4	Donington Park (National Circuit, Leicestershire)	28 April	(United Kingdom) Johnathan Hoggard	(United Kingdom) Kiern Jewiss	(United Kingdom) Johnathan Hoggard	Fortec Motorsports	(Australia) Jack Doohan
2	R5	Donington Park (National Circuit, Leicestershire)	29 April		(United Kingdom) Kiern Jewiss	(United Kingdom) Kiern Jewiss	Double R Racing	(Norway) Dennis Hauger
2	R6	Donington Park (National Circuit, Leicestershire)	29 April	(Finland) Patrik Pasma	(Norway) Dennis Hauger	(United Kingdom) Johnathan Hoggard	Fortec Motorsports	(Australia) Jack Doohan
3	R7	Thruxton Circuit (Hampshire)	19 May	(Norway) Dennis Hauger	(Australia) Jack Doohan	(United Kingdom) Kiern Jewiss	Double R Racing	(Finland) Paavo Tonteri
3	R8	Thruxton Circuit (Hampshire)	20 May		(Australia) Jack Doohan	(United Kingdom) Kiern Jewiss	Double R Racing	(Finland) Paavo Tonteri
3	R9	Thruxton Circuit (Hampshire)	20 May	(Norway) Dennis Hauger	(United Kingdom) Josh Skelton	(Australia) Jack Doohan	TRS Arden Junior Racing Team	(Australia) Jack Doohan
4	R10	Oulton Park (Island Circuit, Cheshire)	9 June	(United Kingdom) Kiern Jewiss	(United Kingdom) Kiern Jewiss	(Norway) Dennis Hauger	TRS Arden Junior Racing Team	(Norway) Dennis Hauger
4	R11	Oulton Park (Island Circuit, Cheshire)	10 June		(Australia) Jack Doohan	(United Kingdom) Ayrton Simmons	JHR Developments	(Australia) Jack Doohan
4	R12	Oulton Park (Island Circuit, Cheshire)	10 June	(United Kingdom) Kiern Jewiss	(United Kingdom) Kiern Jewiss	(United Kingdom) Kiern Jewiss	Double R Racing	(Finland) Paavo Tonteri
5	R13	Croft Circuit (North Yorkshire)	23 June	(Norway) Dennis Hauger	(Norway) Dennis Hauger	(Norway) Dennis Hauger	TRS Arden Junior Racing Team	(Norway) Dennis Hauger
5	R14	Croft Circuit (North Yorkshire)	24 June		(Australia) Jack Doohan	(United Kingdom) Kiern Jewiss	Double R Racing	(Finland) Paavo Tonteri
5	R15	Croft Circuit (North Yorkshire)	24 June	(Norway) Dennis Hauger	(Norway) Dennis Hauger	(Norway) Dennis Hauger	TRS Arden Junior Racing Team	(Norway) Dennis Hauger
6	R16	Snetterton Motor Racing Circuit (300 Circuit, Norfolk)	28 July	(United Kingdom) Ayrton Simmons (Note: Patrik Pasma qualified fastest but was handed a grid penalty for an infraction from the previous round. Ayrton Simmons, who was the next fastest qualifier, thus started on pole position.)	(United Kingdom) Kiern Jewiss	(Norway) Dennis Hauger	TRS Arden Junior Racing Team	(Norway) Dennis Hauger
6	R17	Snetterton Motor Racing Circuit (300 Circuit, Norfolk)	28 July		(Norway) Dennis Hauger	(Finland) Paavo Tonteri	Double R Racing	(Finland) Paavo Tonteri
6	R18	Snetterton Motor Racing Circuit (300 Circuit, Norfolk)	29 July	(Finland) Patrik Pasma	(Finland) Paavo Tonteri	(Australia) Jack Doohan	TRS Arden Junior Racing Team	(Australia) Jack Doohan
7	R19	Rockingham Motor Speedway (International Super Sports Car Circuit, Northamptonshire)	11 August	(Finland) Patrik Pasma	(Finland) Patrik Pasma	(Finland) Patrik Pasma	TRS Arden Junior Racing Team	(Australia) Jack Doohan
7	R20	Rockingham Motor Speedway (International Super Sports Car Circuit, Northamptonshire)	12 August		(Finland) Patrik Pasma	(United Kingdom) Johnathan Hoggard	Fortec Motorsports	(Australia) Jack Doohan
7	R21	Rockingham Motor Speedway (International Super Sports Car Circuit, Northamptonshire)	12 August	(Finland) Patrik Pasma	(United Kingdom) Sebastian Priaulx	(Finland) Patrik Pasma	TRS Arden Junior Racing Team	(United Kingdom) Josh Skelton
8	R22	Knockhill Racing Circuit (Fife)	25 August	(United Kingdom) Johnathan Hoggard	(United Kingdom) Johnathan Hoggard	(United Kingdom) Johnathan Hoggard	Fortec Motorsports	(Australia) Jack Doohan
8	R23	Knockhill Racing Circuit (Fife)	26 August		(United Kingdom) Ayrton Simmons	(United Kingdom) Ayrton Simmons	JHR Developments	(Norway) Dennis Hauger
8	R24	Knockhill Racing Circuit (Fife)	26 August	(United Kingdom) Johnathan Hoggard	(Australia) Jack Doohan	(United Kingdom) Johnathan Hoggard	Fortec Motorsports	(Norway) Dennis Hauger
9	R25	Silverstone Circuit (National Circuit, Northamptonshire)	15 September	(United Kingdom) Johnathan Hoggard	(United Kingdom) Kiern Jewiss	(United Kingdom) Johnathan Hoggard	Fortec Motorsports	(Australia) Jack Doohan
9	R26	Silverstone Circuit (National Circuit, Northamptonshire)	16 September		(Australia) Jack Doohan	(Australia) Jack Doohan	TRS Arden Junior Racing Team	(Australia) Jack Doohan
9	R27	Silverstone Circuit (National Circuit, Northamptonshire)	16 September	(United Kingdom) Johnathan Hoggard	(United Kingdom) Kiern Jewiss	(United Kingdom) Johnathan Hoggard	Fortec Motorsports	(Australia) Jack Doohan
10	R28	Brands Hatch (Grand Prix Circuit, Kent)	29 September	(United Kingdom) Sebastian Priaulx	(United Kingdom) Sebastian Priaulx	(United Kingdom) Sebastian Priaulx	TRS Arden Junior Racing Team	(Finland) Paavo Tonteri
10	R29	Brands Hatch (Grand Prix Circuit, Kent)	30 September		(Australia) Jack Doohan	(United Kingdom) Kiern Jewiss	Double R Racing	(Finland) Paavo Tonteri
10	R30	Brands Hatch (Grand Prix Circuit, Kent)	30 September	(United Kingdom) Johnathan Hoggard	(United Kingdom) Sebastian Priaulx	(United Kingdom) Johnathan Hoggard	Fortec Motorsports	(Finland) Paavo Tonteri

== Championship standings ==
Points were awarded as follows:

Position	**1st**	**2nd**	**3rd**	**4th**	**5th**	**6th**	**7th**	**8th**	**9th**	**10th**
Points	25	18	15	12	10	8	6	4	2	1

=== Drivers' standings ===
Pos	Driver	BHI			DON			THR			OUL			CRO			SNE			ROC			KNO			SIL			BHGP			Pen.	Pts
Pos	Driver	R1	R2	R3	R1	R2	R3	R1	R2	R3	R1	R2	R3	R1	R2	R3	R1	R2	R3	R1	R2	R3	R1	R2	R3	R1	R2	R3	R1	R2	R3	Pen.	Pts
1	(United Kingdom) Kiern Jewiss	2	4	2	Ret	1	3	1	1	5	**2**	3	**1**	2	1	2	12	4	12	5	2	3	4	4	5	2	3	2	6	1	6	3	445
2	(United Kingdom) Ayrton Simmons	**1**	2	**1**	6	2	6	2	3	2	6	1	8	5	Ret	5	**3**	3	5	4	Ret	4	6	1	3	6	4	Ret	5	5	4		374
3	(United Kingdom) Johnathan Hoggard	6	5	11	**1**	5	1	6	Ret	13	8	7	Ret	6	9	7	8	8	4	7	1	5	**1**	Ret	**1**	**1**	6	**1**	2	3	**1**		339
4	(Norway) Dennis Hauger	3	7	9	4	3	10	**Ret**	6	**3**	1	6	5	**1**	3	**1**	1	6	2	3	5	Ret	7	5	4	4	5	4	7	7	11	3	329
5	(Australia) Jack Doohan	9	3	7	3	4	4	4	9	1	5	2	6	Ret	4	3	4	11	1	2	3	Ret	3	9	6	3	1	3	8	8	7		328
6	(Finland) Patrik Pasma	7	6	8	Ret	8	**2**	5	Ret	4	3	5	2	3	Ret	Ret	7	5	**6**	**1**	4	**1**	2	3	2	5	2	6	4	2	5	18	315
7	(United Kingdom) Sebastian Priaulx	4	1	4	2	6	5	10	7	6	10	9	Ret	10	7	6	2	2	7	6	Ret	2	5	2	11	9	8	8	**1**	6	2		275
8	(Finland) Paavo Tonteri	5	Ret	3	Ret	7	9	3	2	9	4	4	3	4	2	4	5	1	3	9	6	Ret	8	Ret	7	8	Ret	10	3	4	3		266
9	(Mexico) Manuel Sulaimán	8	12	Ret	10	13	Ret	Ret	4	11	9	8	7	8	6	8	11	12	9	8	7	10	9	6	10	7	7	5	Ret	9	9		95
10	(United Kingdom) Josh Skelton	12	11	5	11	10	8	7	5	7	11	11	9	7	5	Ret	9	7	13	10	8	6	10	Ret	8	Ret	9	11	11	Ret	10		84
11	(Sweden) Hampus Ericsson	13	10	6	5	Ret	Ret	11	10	8	7	13	4	9	8	Ret	DNS	DNS	Ret	14	Ret	7											54
12	(Mexico) Sebastián Álvarez	11	Ret	Ret	9	9	Ret	Ret	8	14	13	12	10	13	11	9	6	9	11	11	9	9	11	7	Ret	11	Ret	7	10	11	Ret		38
13	(United Kingdom) Jamie Sharp	14	9	10	7	12	7	9	Ret	12	Ret	14	Ret	11	Ret	11	10	Ret	10	12	DSQ	8	12	8	9	12	10	Ret	12	12	8	3	31
14	(Republic of Ireland) Lucca Allen	10	8	Ret	8	11	Ret	8	11	10	12	10	11	12	10	10	Ret	10	8	13	10	11				10	Ret	9	9	10	Ret		29
15	(United Kingdom) Christian Lester																									DNS	11	12					0
Pos	Driver	R1	R2	R3	R1	R2	R3	R1	R2	R3	R1	R2	R3	R1	R2	R3	R1	R2	R3	R1	R2	R3	R1	R2	R3	R1	R2	R3	R1	R2	R3	Pen.	Pts
Pos	Driver	BHI			DON			THR			OUL			CRO			SNE			ROC			KNO			SIL			BHGP			Pen.	Pts

=== Rookie Cup ===
Pos	Driver	BHI			DON			THR			OUL			CRO			SNE			ROC			KNO			SIL			BHGP			Pen.	Pts
Pos	Driver	R1	R2	R3	R1	R2	R3	R1	R2	R3	R1	R2	R3	R1	R2	R3	R1	R2	R3	R1	R2	R3	R1	R2	R3	R1	R2	R3	R1	R2	R3	Pen.	Pts
1	(Australia) Jack Doohan	9	3	7	3	4	4	4	9	1	5	2	6	Ret	4	3	4	11	1	2	3	Ret	3	9	6	3	1	3	8	8	7		548
2	(Norway) Dennis Hauger	3	7	9	4	3	10	Ret	6	3	1	6	5	1	3	1	1	6	2	3	5	Ret	7	5	4	4	5	4	7	7	11	3	533
3	(Finland) Paavo Tonteri	5	Ret	3	Ret	7	9	3	2	9	4	4	3	4	2	4	5	1	3	9	6	Ret	8	Ret	7	8	Ret	10	3	4	3		471
4	(United Kingdom) Josh Skelton	12	11	5	11	10	8	7	5	7	11	11	9	7	5	Ret	9	7	13	10	8	6	10	Ret	8	Ret	9	11	11	Ret	10		352
5	(Mexico) Sebastián Álvarez	11	Ret	Ret	9	9	Ret	Ret	8	14	13	12	10	13	12	9	6	9	11	11	9	9	11	7	Ret	11	Ret	7	10	11	Ret		278
6	(United Kingdom) Christian Lester																									DNS	11	12					20
Pos	Driver	R1	R2	R3	R1	R2	R3	R1	R2	R3	R1	R2	R3	R1	R2	R3	R1	R2	R3	R1	R2	R3	R1	R2	R3	R1	R2	R3	R1	R2	R3	Pen.	Pts
Pos	Driver	BHI			DON			THR			OUL			CRO			SNE			ROC			KNO			SIL			BHGP			Pen.	Pts

Colour	Result
Gold	Winner
Silver	Second place
Bronze	Third place
Green	Points classification
Blue	Non-points classification
Blue	Non-classified finish (NC)
Purple	Retired, not classified (Ret)
Red	Did not qualify (DNQ)
Red	Did not pre-qualify (DNPQ)
Black	Disqualified (DSQ)
White	Did not start (DNS)
White	Withdrew (WD)
White	Race cancelled (C)
Blank	Did not practice (DNP)
Blank	Did not arrive (DNA)
Blank	Excluded (EX)

**Bold** – Pole
Italics – Fastest Lap
† — Did not finish, but classified

=== Teams Cup ===
Each team nominated two drivers to score points before every round. All non-nominated drivers were ignored.

Pos	Team	Pts
1	TRS Arden Junior Racing Team	837
2	Double R Racing	798
3	JHR Developments	566
4	Fortec Motorsports	515
5	Sharp Motorsport	136
6	Rossoverde / Scorpio Motorsport	8
