= Kiern Jewiss =

British racing driver (born 2002)

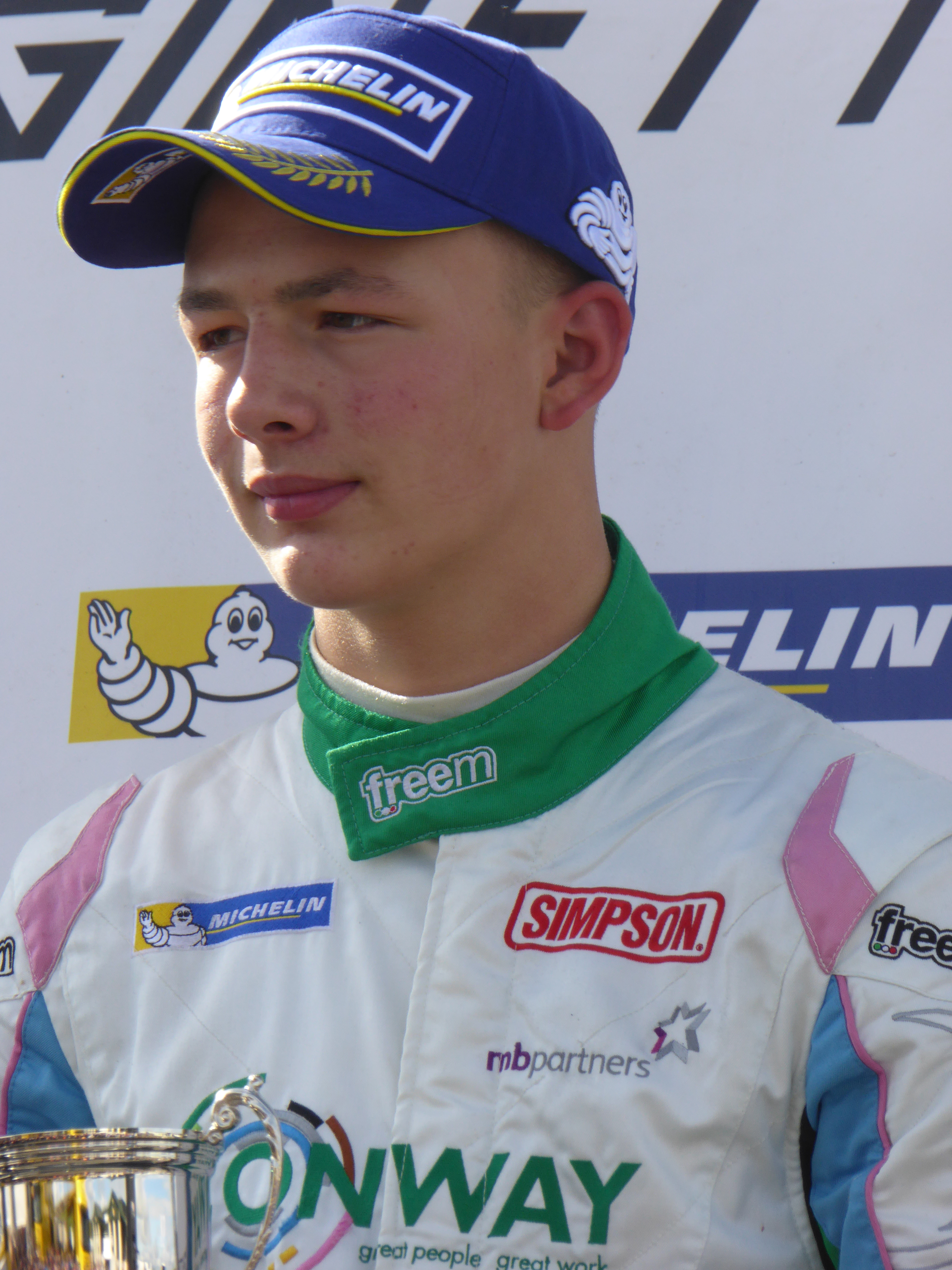
- Jewiss on the podium at Knockhill in the 2017 Ginetta Junior Championship.
- Nationality: (United Kingdom) British
- Born: Kiern Tyler Jewiss; 3 July 2002 (age 24) Maidstone, United Kingdom

British GT Championship career
- Debut season: 2025
- Current team: 2 Seas Motorsport
- Categorisation: FIA Silver (until 2025); FIA Gold (2026–)
- Car number: 42
- Starts: 10
- Wins: 3
- Podiums: 4
- Poles: 2
- Fastest laps: 0
- Best finish: 1st in 2025

Kiern Tyler Jewiss (born 3 July 2002) is a British racing driver who last competed in the 2025 British GT Championship for 2 Seas Motorsport. He is the winner of the 2018 F4 British Championship and the 2022 Porsche Carrera Cup Great Britain. In 2025, he won the British GT Championship alongside Charles Dawson.

== Career ==
=== Karting ===
Jewiss had a decorated karting career after making his competitive debut in 2010, he won eleven karting titles, with ten of them being in the United Kingdom, including winning the Super One Series two times.

In 2016, Jewiss stepped up to the OKJ for his only international year in karting, which was also his final full-time before making his car racing debut. He started the season with winning the WSK Champions Cup with Riccardo Kart Racing, Jewiss also competed in the WSK Super Master Series and the WSK Final Cup, but came 18th in the former and sixth in the latter.

Jewiss also made his debut in the CIK-FIA European Championship, where he finished tenth in the overall standings, and then the CIK-FIA World Championship, where finished in seventh.

To round off the year, Jewiss competed in the Super One Series and finished the championship in ninth.

2017 was Jewiss' last competitive outing in karts, where he made his OK debut, at the 22° South Garda Winter Cup for Forza Racing where he came in 17th.

=== Ginetta Junior Championship ===
Jewiss made his car racing debut in the 2017 Ginetta Junior Championship for Douglas Motorsport. Despite only getting one win at Knockhill, he got twelve podiums and three pole positions throughout the season, where he finished his maiden racing season fourth in the championship standings with 542 points, also being the highest finishing rookie with a sizeable margin.

Jewiss finished runner-up to the end of the season Ginetta Junior Winter Series, with two wins, three pole positions, one fastest lap, three podiums and 120 points amongst the four races.

=== F4 British Championship ===
Following his successful year in Ginetta's, Jewiss made his single-seater and Formula 4 debut in the 2018 F4 British Championship with Double R Racing alongside Paavo Tonteri and Sebastián Álvarez.

After a win heavy first half of the season, the latter half was less successful, as Jewiss only took one win but maintained a consistent enough points streak to win the title in his rookie Formula 4 year and his 71 points margin was the biggest gap of the championship winner and the championships runner-up until 2024, when Deagen Fairclough won the championship with a 222.5 points margin.

Jewiss collected six wins, two pole positions, seven fastest laps and eighteen podiums throughout the thirty races in the series. He was also a finalist of the 2018 McLaren Autosport BRDC Award.

=== BRDC British Formula 3 Championship ===
==== 2019 ====
With his championship exploits, Jewiss moved up to the Formula 3 level BRDC British Formula 3 Championship for the 2019 season, where he reunited with his Ginetta team Douglas Motorsport. His teammates for the season were Ulysse de Pauw and future IndyCar Series driver Benjamin Pedersen.

The first half of Jewiss' championship had consistent points finishes, but he only managed to get two third places – at Snetterton Circuit and Donington Park – while the final half of the season was more successful, getting back-to-back podiums at the third race of Circuit de Spa-Francorchamps and the first race of Brands Hatch. Not long after, his first Formula 3 win at the third rounds of Brands Hatch, where he got another back-to-back podium and first pole position at the first race at Silverstone Circuit, where he came second.

Jewiss also got another second place and pole position at the third race of the Silverstone round. The final round of the series at Donington Park also followed a similar pattern, where he came second in the first and third races. Jewiss finished the championship 4th in the standings with one win, two pole positions, two fastest laps, nine podiums and 438 points.

==== 2020 ====
Jewiss renewed his partnership with Douglas Motorsport for the 2020 season and grabbed with second win in the series at the first race of the opening round at Oulton Park. He would not get a single podium throughout the rest of the races he competed in and left the team and the championship halfway through the season, where he finished 13th in the drivers championship with 211 points.

=== Porsche Carrera Cup Great Britain ===
==== 2021 ====
After exiting single-seaters, Jewiss moved to one-make Porsche Carrera Cup racing, driving in the Porsche Carrera Cup Great Britain for the 2021 season with Team Parker Racing alongside Harry King. He set an ambitious target of winning the title in his debut season.

Jewiss got his first podium in the series in his debut race at Brands Hatch with a second place, after two fourth places, he got his maiden win at the second race of the second round at Snetterton Circuit.

At Oulton Park, Jewiss came fifth in the first race and got his first pole position in the series at the second race, where he would convert it to his second win of the year. Knockhill proved to be difficult as he got his only retirement of the year at the second race. Jewiss claimed his third win at the second race of Croft Circuit and came third in the next race at Silverstone Circuit, getting his first back-to-back podiums.

In the penultimate round at Donington Park, Jewiss got his only double podium, with a third place in the first race and a final win to add to his tally in the second race. He came fifth and fourth in the final round at Brands Hatch, and finished third in the overall standings with four wins, one pole position, seven podiums and 104 points.

==== 2022 ====
Jewiss contested the 2022 Porsche Carrera Cup Great Britain for a second season with Team Parker Racing.

The first round at Donington Park didn't go as expected, coming fourteenth in the first race but getting a podium in the second round, salvaging the last races poor performance. What followed was a podium streak – including a win at Brands Hatch – lasting for six races.

At the next round at Snetterton Circuit, Jewiss converted a pole position to a win, and after two podiumless races, he would win four races in a row, which were the final races of the championship. He won the championship ahead of Adam Smalley with six wins, four pole positions, seven fastest laps, eleven podiums and 141 points.

=== GT3 ===
==== 2023 ====
With Team Parker Racing, Jewiss moved to the GT World Challenge Europe Endurance Cup for the 2023 season, where he competed in the Bronze Cup.

Jewiss only managed two points finishes, and didn't enter the final round of the championship at Circuit de Barcelona-Catalunya. Jewiss ended the championship in 35th with two points in the Bronze classification.

==== 2024 ====
Jewiss' only racing activity for the year for a one-off cameo for Steller Motorsport in the second round of the 2024 Le Mans Cup at Circuit Paul Ricard partnering Darren Malkin, where they came sixth in the race.

==== 2025 ====
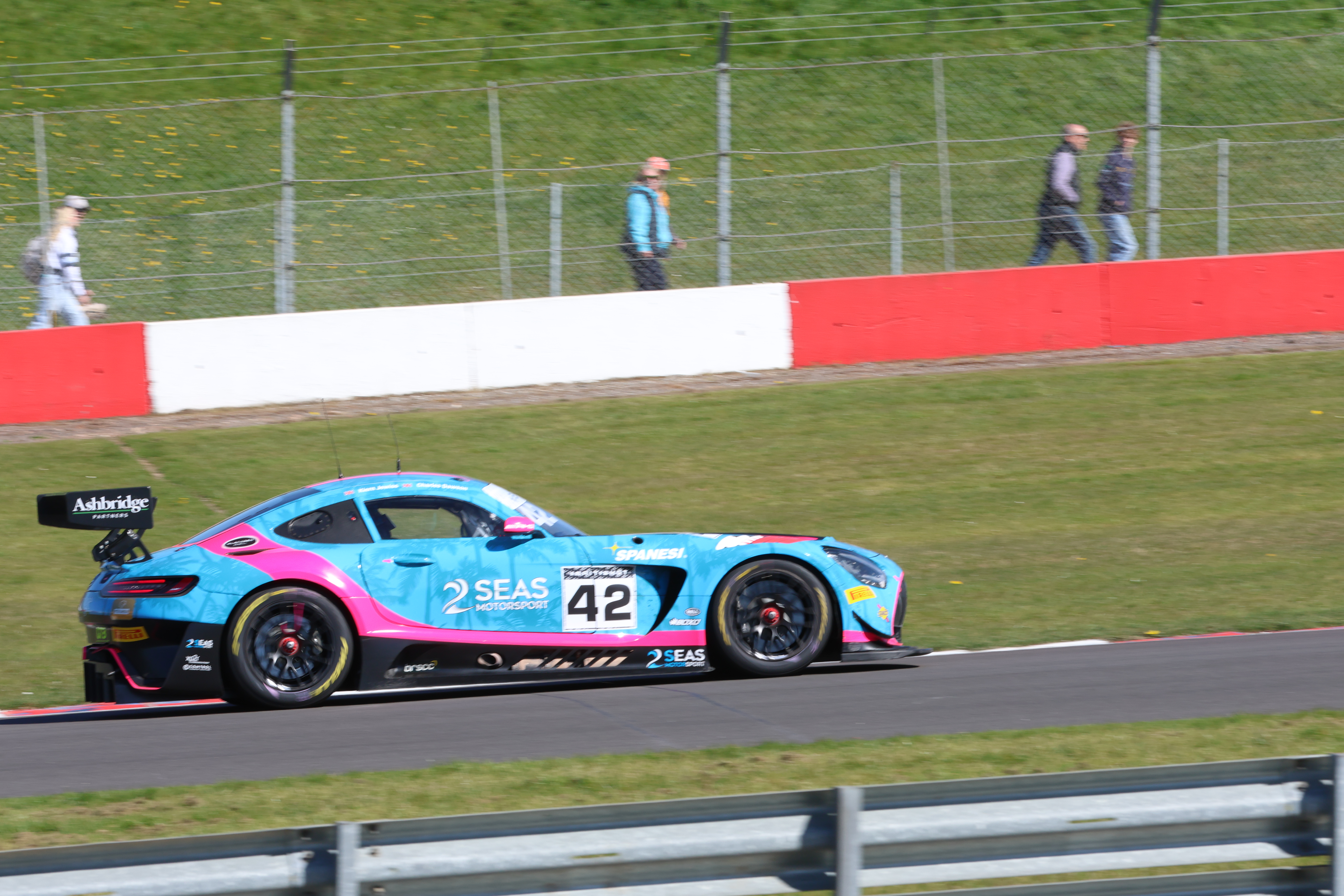
Jewiss' 2 Seas Motorsport Mercedes at Donington in 2025.

Jewiss found a seat for the 2025 season in the form of the British GT Championship driving for 2 Seas Motorsport and partnering Charles Dawson. He and Dawson won the title, taking race wins at Donington Park, Silverstone Circuit, Snetterton Circuit, and Brands Hatch. Jewiss also competed in the 2025 GT World Challenge Europe Endurance Cup, taking a podium in the silver class of the first round at Circuit Paul Ricard.

==== 2026 ====
Jewiss and Dawson returned for the first round of the 2026 British GT Championship at Silverstone Circuit, but retired from the race. With 2 Seas, he contested both the GT World Challenge Europe Endurance Cup and the Sprint Cup in the bronze class. In the former, his best result was in the fourth round at the Nürburgring, where he started on pole and converted it to his first GTWC win. In the latter, he took four podiums at Misano, Magny-Cours, and Zandvoort, to finish third in the standings.

== Karting record ==
=== Karting career summary ===
Season	Series	Team	Position
2010	Buckmore Park Winter Championship - Honda Clubman Cadet	Ktj Racing	1st
2010	Bayford Meadows Winter Series - Honda Cadet	Ktj Racing	1st
2011	Trent Valley Kart Club - Honda Cadet		27th
2011	Lydd Winter Championship - Honda Cadet	Ktj Racing	1st
2011	Buckmore Park Winter Championship - Honda Cadet	Ktj Racing	1st
2011	Super One Series - Honda Cadet	Ktj Racing	11th
2012	Trent Valley Kart Club - Honda Cadet		12th
2012	Henry Surtees Commemorative Meeting - Honda Cadet	Ktj Racing	1st
2012	Kartmasters British GP - Honda Cadet	Ktj Racing	2nd
2012	ABkC 'O' Plate - Honda Cadet	Ktj Racing	3rd
2012	Formula Kart Stars - Honda Cadet	Ktj Racing	1st
2012	Super One Series - Honda Cadet	Ktj Racing	3rd
2013	LGM Series - IAME Cadet		10th
2013	Super One Series - Honda Cadet	Next-Gen Motorsport	1st
2013	Super One Series - IAME Cadet	Next-Gen Motorsport	5th
2013	Kartmasters British GP - IAME Cadet		16th
2013	Kartmasters British GP - Honda Cadet		3rd
2014	LGM Series - IAME Cadet		4th
2014	Super One Series - Honda Cadet		2nd
2014	Kartmasters British GP - IAME Cadet		1st
2014	Kartmasters British GP - Honda Cadet		2nd
2014	Super One Series - IAME Cadet	AIM Motorsport	2nd
2015	Kartmasters British GP - Mini Max		1st
2015	Rotax Max Euro Trophy - Junior Max	Strawberry Racing	9th
2015	Super One Series - Mini Max	Strawberry Racing	1st
2015	Rotax Max Wintercup - Junior Max	Strawberry Racing	8th
2016	WSK Champions Cup - OKJ	Ricciardo Kart Racing	1st
2016	WSK Super Master Series - OK Junior		18th
2016	CIK-FIA European Championship — OKJ		10th
2016	CIK-FIA World Championship — OKJ	Forza Racing	7th
2016	WSK Final Cup - OK Junior	Forza Racing	6th
2016	Super One Series - OK Junior		9th
2017	22° South Garda Winter Cup - OK	Forza Racing	17th

== Racing record ==
=== Racing career summary ===
Season	Series	Team	Races	Wins	Poles	F/Laps	Podiums	Points	Position
2017	Ginetta Junior Championship	Douglas Motorsport	26	1	3	1	12	542	4th
2017	Ginetta Junior Winter Series	Douglas Motorsport	4	2	3	1	3	120	**2nd**
2018	F4 British Championship	Double R Racing	30	6	2	7	18	445	**1st**
2019	BRDC British Formula 3 Championship	Douglas Motorsport	24	1	2	2	9	438	4th
2020	BRDC British Formula 3 Championship	Douglas Motorsport	14	1	0	0	1	211	13th
2021	Porsche Carrera Cup Great Britain - Pro	Team Parker Racing	16	4	1	0	7	104	**3rd**
2022	Porsche Carrera Cup Great Britain - Pro	Team Parker Racing	16	6	4	7	11	141	**1st**
2023	GT World Challenge Europe Endurance Cup	Team Parker Racing	4	0	0	0	0	0	NC
2023	GT World Challenge Europe Endurance Cup - Bronze	Team Parker Racing	4	0	0	0	0	2	35th
2024	Le Mans Cup - GT3	Steller Motorsport	1	0	0	0	0	8	21st
2025	GT World Challenge Europe Endurance Cup - Silver	Steller Motorsport	1	0	0	0	1	24	17th
2025	GT World Challenge Europe Endurance Cup	Steller Motorsport	1	0	0	0	0	0	NC
2025	GT World Challenge Europe Endurance Cup	2 Seas Motorsport	2	0	0	0	0	0	NC
2025	GT World Challenge Europe Endurance Cup - Bronze	2 Seas Motorsport	2	0	0	0	0	6	33th
2025	British GT Championship - GT3	2 Seas Motorsport	9	3	2	0	4	173.5	**1st**
2026	GT World Challenge Europe Endurance Cup	2 Seas Motorsport	5	0	0	0	0	0	NC
2026	GT World Challenge Europe Endurance Cup - Bronze	2 Seas Motorsport	5	2	1	0	2	82	**3rd**
2026	GT World Challenge Europe Sprint Cup	2 Seas Motorsport	8	0	0	0	0	0	NC
2026	GT World Challenge Europe Sprint Cup - Bronze	2 Seas Motorsport	8	0	4	1	4	69.5	**3rd**
2026	British GT Championship - GT3	2 Seas Motorsport	1	0	0	0	0	0	NC†
2026-27	Asian Le Mans Series - GT3	2 Seas Motorsport							

^{†} As Jewiss was a guest driver, he was ineligible for points. ^{*} Season in progress

=== Complete Ginetta Junior Championship results ===
(key) (Races in bold indicate pole position) (Races in italics indicate fastest lap)

Year	Team	1	2	3	4	5	6	7	8	9	10	11	12	13	14	15	16	17	18	19	20	21	22	23	24	25	26	DC	Points
2017	Douglas Motorsport	BHI; 1 Ret	BHI; 2; 11	DON; 1; 2	DON; 2 Ret	DON; 3; 2	THR1; 1; 12	THR1; 2; 4	OUL; 1; 3	OUL; 2; 3	CRO; 1; 2	CRO; 2; 2	CRO; 3; 2	**SNE**; **1**; 2	**SNE**; **2**; 5	SNE; 3; 2	KNO; 1; 2	**KNO**; **2**; 1	ROC; 1 NC	ROC; 2; 9	ROC; 3; 7	SIL; 1; 9	SIL; 2; 5	SIL; 3; 4	BHGP; 1; 3	BHGP; 2; 5	BHGP; 3; 5	4th	542

=== Complete F4 British Championship results ===
(key) (Races in bold indicate pole position) (Races in italics indicate fastest lap)

Year	Team	1	2	3	4	5	6	7	8	9	10	11	12	13	14	15	16	17	18	19	20	21	22	23	24	25	26	27	28	29	30	Pos	Points
2018	Double R Racing	BRI; 1; 2	BRI; 2; 4	BRI; 3; 2	DON; 1 Ret	DON; 2; 1	DON; 3; 3	THR; 1; 1	THR; 2; 1	THR; 3; 5	**OUL**; **1**; 2	OUL; 2; 3	**OUL**; **3**; 1	CRO; 1; 2	CRO; 2; 1	CRO; 3; 2	SNE; 1; 12	SNE; 2; 4	SNE; 3; 12	ROC; 1; 5	ROC; 2; 2	ROC; 3; 3	KNO; 1; 4	KNO; 2; 4	KNO; 3; 5	SIL; 1; 2	SIL; 2; 3	SIL; 3; 2	BHGP; 1; 6	BHGP; 2; 1	BHGP; 3; 6	1st	445

=== Complete BRDC British Formula 3 Championship results ===
(key) (Races in bold indicate pole position) (Races in italics indicate fastest lap)

Year	Team	1	2	3	4	5	6	7	8	9	10	11	12	13	14	15	16	17	18	19	20	21	22	23	24	Pos	Points
2019	Douglas Motorsport	OUL; 1; 9	OUL; 2; 4^{1}	OUL; 3; 4	SNE; 1; 3	SNE; 2; 13^{1}	SNE; 3 Ret	SIL1; 1; 9	SIL1; 2; 16	SIL1; 3; 4	DON1; 1; 3	DON1; 2; 10^{2}	DON1; 3; 6	SPA; 1; 5	SPA; 2; 8^{6}	SPA; 3; 3	BRH; 1; 2	BRH; 2; 11^{4}	BRH; 3; 1	**SIL2**; **1**; 2	SIL2; 2; 8^{7}	**SIL2**; **3**; 2	DON2; 1; 2	DON2; 2; 5^{9}	DON2; 3; 2	4th	438
2020	Douglas Motorsport	OUL; 1; 1	OUL; 2; 13^{1}	OUL; 3; 4	OUL; 4; 5	DON1; 1; 5	DON1; 2; 12^{2}	DON1; 3; 5	BRH; 1; 5	BRH; 2; 5^{5}	BRH; 3; 5	BRH; 4; 4	DON2; 1 NC	DON2; 2; 17	DON2; 3; 8	SNE; 1	SNE; 2	SNE; 3	SNE; 4	DON3; 1	DON3; 2	DON3; 3	SIL; 1	SIL; 2	SIL; 3	13th	211

=== Complete Porsche Carrera Cup Great Britain results ===
(key) (Races in bold indicate pole position) (Races in italics indicate fastest lap)

Year	Team	1	2	3	4	5	6	7	8	9	10	11	12	13	14	15	16	Pos.	Points
2021	Team Parker Racing	BHI; 1; 2	BHI; 2; 4	SNE; 1; 4	SNE; 2; 1	OUL; 1; 5	**OUL**; **2**; 1	KNO; 1; 5	KNO; 2 Ret	CRO; 1; 4	CRO; 2; 1	SIL; 1; 3	SIL; 2; 7	DON; 1; 3	DON; 2; 1	BHGP; 1; 5	BHGP; 2; 4	3rd	104
2022	Team Parker Racing	DON; 1; 14	DON; 2; 3	BRH; 1; 2	BRH; 2; 1	**OUL**; **1**; 3	OUL; 2; 3	KNO; 1; 2	KNO; 2; 4	**SNE**; **1**; 1	SNE; 2; 4	THR; 1; 5	THR; 2; 5	**SIL**; **1**; 1	SIL; 2; 1	**BRH**; **1**; 1	BRH; 2; 2	**1st**	**141**

=== Complete GT World Challenge Europe results ===
==== GT World Challenge Europe Endurance Cup ====
(key) (Races in bold indicate pole position) (Races in italics indicate fastest lap)

Year	Team	Car	Class	1	2	3	4	5	6	7	Pos.	Points
2023	Team Parker Racing	Porsche 911 GT3 R (992)	Bronze	MNZ; 34	LEC; 30	SPA; 6H; 49	SPA; 12H; 33	SPA; 24H; 33	NÜR; 45	CAT	35th	2
2025	Steller Motorsport	Chevrolet Corvette Z06 GT3.R	Silver	LEC; 19	MNZ						17th	24
2025	2 Seas Motorsport	Mercedes-AMG GT3 Evo	Bronze			SPA; 6H; 56	SPA; 12H; 40	SPA; 24H; 26	NÜR	CAT; 44	33th	6
2026	2 Seas Motorsport	Mercedes-AMG GT3 Evo	Bronze	LEC; 27	MNZ; 41†	SPA; 6H; 38	SPA; 12H; 20	SPA; 24H; 27	**NÜR**; 23	ALG; 13	3rd	82

==== GT World Challenge Europe Sprint Cup ====
(key) (Races in bold indicate pole position) (Races in italics indicate fastest lap)

Year	Team	Car	Class	1	2	3	4	5	6	7	8	Pos.	Points
2026	2 Seas Motorsport	Mercedes-AMG GT3 Evo	Bronze	MIS; 1; 26	**MIS**; **2**; 31	**MAG**; **1**; 21	MAG; 2; 25	ZAN; 1; 26	**ZAN**; **2**; 23	**CAT**; **1**; 35	CAT; 2; 30	3rd	69.5

=== Complete British GT Championship results ===
(key) (Races in bold indicate pole position) (Races in italics indicate fastest lap)

Year	Team	Car	Class	1	2	3	4	5	6	7	8	9	DC	Points
2025	2 Seas Motorsport	Mercedes-AMG GT3 Evo	GT3	**DON**; **1**; 1	SIL; 1; 2	OUL; 1; 9	OUL; 2; 11	SPA; 1; 6	**SNE**; **1**; 1	SNE; 2; 8	BRH; 1; 1	DON; 1; 4	1st	173.5
2026	2 Seas Motorsport	Mercedes-AMG GT3 Evo	GT3	SIL; 1 Ret	OUL; 1	OUL; 2	SPA; 1	SNE; 1	SNE; 2	DON; 1	BRH; 1		NC†	0†

^{†} As Jewiss was a guest driver, he was ineligible for points.

Sporting positions
Preceded by Jamie Caroline	F4 British Championship; Champion; 2018	Succeeded by Zane Maloney
Preceded by Dan Cammish	Porsche Carrera Cup GB; Champion; 2022	Succeeded by Adam Smalley
Preceded by Rob Collard; Ricky Collard	British GT Championship; Champion; 2025; With: Charles Dawson	Succeeded by Incumbent
Preceded by Rob Collard; Ricky Collard	British GT Championship; Pro-Am Champion; 2025; With: Charles Dawson	Succeeded by Incumbent
