= Super One National Kart Championships =

British kart racing championship

(United Kingdom) Super One National Kart Championships
- Category: Kart racing
- Country: United Kingdom
- Affiliations: Motorsport UK
- Inaugural season: 1983; 43 years ago
- Official website: Official website

The Super One National Kart Championships (S1) is a karting championship based in the United Kingdom. It has been in operation since 1983 and is regarded as the premier karting championship in the UK, producing professional drivers including Lewis Hamilton, Jenson Button, David Coulthard, Alexander Albon, Dan Wheldon, Anthony Davidson, Zhou Guanyu, Lando Norris, and more.

== History ==
The first Super 1 meeting was held in 1983 at Snetterton where only four classes were run as part of the championship. At the time, the championship was not officially recognised as being the "British Championship" as the RAC national titles were decided over a one-weekend event. This continued up till 1990 when Super 1 secured the rights to decide the British champion over the course of the series.

Over the years, the Super 1 series has produced champions that have gone on to race in Formula 1 such as David Coulthard, Will Stevens, Allan McNish, Lando Norris, Jenson Button, Anthony Davidson, Paul di Resta, Ralph Firman and Lewis Hamilton. Other drivers who have won a Super 1 championship and who have gone on to professional motor racing include Gary Paffett, Mike Conway, Dan Wheldon, Ben Hanley, Oliver Jarvis, Oliver Rowland and Billy Monger.

Caleb McDuff became the first ever profoundly deaf driver to take a podium finish in 2019, finishing 2nd at Rowrah. He went on to finish the season in first place in the championship, winning the Honda Cadet class

Another Notable driver who now competes in the Formula E Championship after a controversial racing career is Dan Ticktum, who won the Bamford Kart Club Winter Series in 2008 while also competing in the Super 1 National kart Championship.

== Classes ==
Originally, there were only four classes in the Super 1 series. In 2017, 11 different classes ran within the series over 11 different race weekends.

=== Bambino classes ===
For drivers from 6 years of age up to the year of their 8th birthday.

- Bambino

=== Cadet classes ===
For drivers from 8 years of age up to and including the year of their 13th birthday.

- IAME Cadet
- Honda Cadet
- Mini Rok
- MightE Cadet
- MightE Super Cadet (Inter)

=== Junior classes ===
For drivers from 12 years of age up to and including the year of their 17th birthday.

- Minimax
- Junior Rotax
- Junior TKM
- Junior X30
- Junior OK
- Rok

=== Senior classes ===
For drivers over 16 years of age.

- Rotax Max Challenge 177
- TKM Extreme
- Senior X30
- Senior OK
- KZ
- Rok
