= Dubai Autodrome =

Motorsports circuit in Dubai, United Arab Emirates

- Grand Prix Circuit (2004–present)
- Location: Dubai Motor City, Al Hebiah 1, Dubai, United Arab Emirates
- Coordinates: 25°03′00″N 55°14′20″E
- Capacity: 30,000
- FIA Grade: 1 (2 layouts); 3 (2 layouts)
- Broke ground: 2002
- Opened: 6 October 2004; 22 years ago
- Architect: Apex Circuit Design
- Major events: Current: 24H Series Middle East; Dubai 24 Hour (2006–2026); Asian Le Mans Series; 4 Hours of Dubai (2021–2026); FR Middle East (2023–present); Former: FR Asia (2020–2022); TCR Middle East (2017–2019); TCR International Series (2017); FIA GT (2004–2006); GP2 Asia (2008); A1 Grand Prix (2005); ETCC (2004)
- Website: dubaiautodrome.ae

Grand Prix Circuit (2004–present)
- Length: 5.390 km (3.349 mi)
- Turns: 17
- Race lap record: 1:41.220 ( (Japan) Kamui Kobayashi, Dallara GP2/05, 2008, GP2A)

International Circuit (2004–present)
- Length: 4.290 km (2.666 mi)
- Turns: 12
- Race lap record: 1:22.453 ( (France) Romain Grosjean, Dallara GP2/05, 2008, GP2A)

National Circuit (2004–present)
- Length: 3.560 km (2.212 mi)
- Turns: 16
- Race lap record: 1:21.997 ( (South Africa) Jonathan Aberdein, Tatuus F4-T014, 2016, F4)

Club Circuit (2004–present)
- Length: 2.460 km (1.529 mi)
- Turns: 11

Hill Handling Circuit (2004–present)
- Length: 1.620 km (1.007 mi)
- Turns: 9

Oval Handling Circuit (2004–present)
- Length: 1.120 km (0.696 mi)
- Turns: 6

The Dubai Autodrome (دبي أوتودروم) is an FIA sanctioned 5.390 km (3.349 mi) motorsports circuit located in Dubailand, Dubai, United Arab Emirates. The architects of the project were Populous and the circuit was designed by Clive Bowen of Apex Circuit Design.

Opened in October 2004 with the final round of the LG Super Racing Weekend featuring the final rounds of the FIA GT Championship, European Touring Car Championship and 2004 Formula Renault V6 Eurocup season, Dubai Autodrome was the first part of the Dubai Motor City development that was available for use. The venue hosted the December 2005 A1 Grand Prix and the FIA GT Championship from 2004 to 2006. The track record at the longest configuration was set by Kamui Kobayashi (DAMS) with a time of 1:41.220 in a GP2 Asia car. The Dubai Kartdrome includes international standard karting track which across the boulevard from Dubai Autodrome, it declares the championship level karting also becoming popular for its arrive and drive karting at both the outdoor and indoor venues.

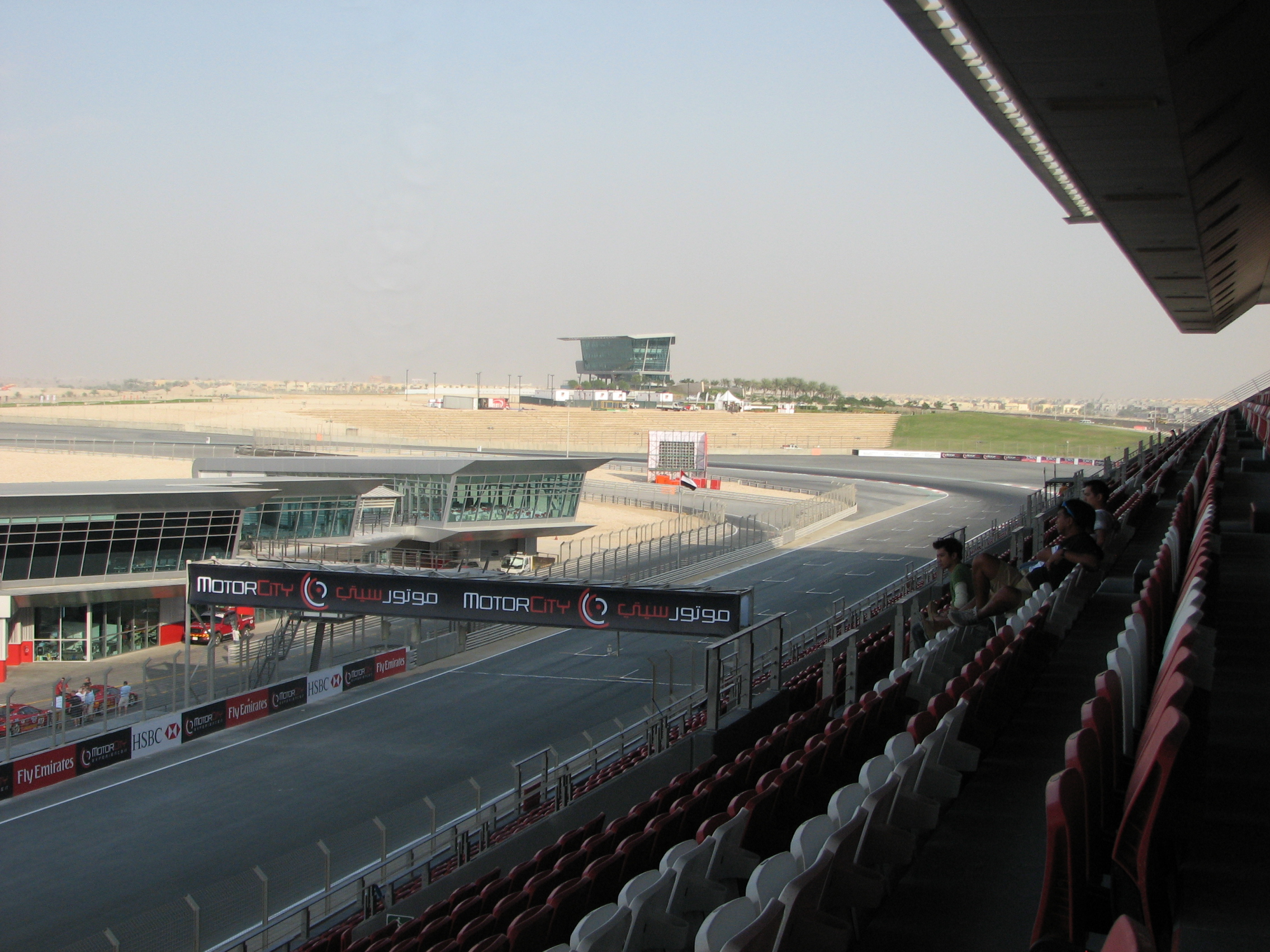
Finish line Dubai Autodrome

Since 2006 the Autodrome has been home to the Dubai 24 Hour, a GT, sports car and touring car automobile endurance race open to both professional and semi-professional teams. The circuit has FIA Grade 1 license, which means that it has all the requirements to host a Formula One race (though Abu Dhabi currently hosts F1 races in the UAE). Dubai Autodrome will include retail stores, themed restaurants and refreshment outlets and will also provide private corporate hospitality suites with a public grandstand that can play host to 7,000 spectators.

== Events ==
Current

- January: 24H Series Middle East Dubai 24 Hour, Porsche Carrera Cup Middle East
- February: Asian Le Mans Series 4 Hours of Dubai, Formula Regional Middle East Championship, F4 Middle East Championship
- March: Gulf Procar Championship, Gulf Radical Cup, DSBK National Championship
- April: Gulf Procar Championship
- November: UAE Procar Championship, Gulf Radical Cup, Formula Trophy
- December: UAE Procar Championship, Gulf Radical Cup

Former

- A1 Grand Prix (2005)
- European Touring Car Championship (2004)
- Ferrari Challenge Asia-Pacific (2022–2023)
- FIA GT Championship (2004–2006)
- FIA GT3 European Championship (2007–2008)
- Formula 4 Australian Championship (2024)
- Formula 4 UAE Championship (2016–2024)
- Formula Regional Asian Championship (2020–2022)
- Formula Renault V6 Eurocup (2004)
- Formula Trophy UAE (2024–2025)
- GP2 Asia Series (2008)
- MRF Challenge Formula 2000 Championship (2015–2019)
- Speedcar Series (2008–2009)
- TCR International Series (2017)
- TCR Middle East Series (2017–2019)

== Dubai Kartdrome ==
Dubai Kartdrome is an international FIA-standard karting track located across the Boulevard from Dubai Autodrome’s main straight. The outdoor circuit has 17 corners on the International Layout with a length of 1.2km, whereas the indoor circuit has a length of 620 metres.

The outdoor circuit hosts a variety of national and international competitions such as IAME Series UAE, Rotax MAX Challenge UAE, DAMC, Champions of the Future Academy Series (formerly) and the Biland Kart GP World Finals 2006.

Dubai Kartdrome also hosts their own International Karting event, The Dubai O Plate part of the Dubai Autodrome Motorsports Club Cup (DAMC Cup), the event is hosted annually and is the flagship event of Dubai Kartdrome. Additionally, kartdrome hosts their Rental-kart Endurance Racing series called the Dubai Kartdrome Endurance Championship since 2005, attracting competitors from around the world.

== Track configurations ==
The circuit has four racing configurations and two additional non-racing sections. These are the courses with access to the pit area.

Grand Prix course

International Course

National Course

Club Course

=== Handling courses ===
Hill Handling Course

Oval Handling Course

== Lap records ==
The official lap record for the current circuit layout is 1:41.220, set by Kamui Kobayashi during the 2008 2nd Dubai GP2 Asia Series round, while the unofficial all-time track record is 1:40.887, set by Romain Grosjean in the qualifying of the aforementioned race. As of April 2026, the fastest official race lap records at the Dubai Autodrome are listed as:

Category	Time	Driver	Vehicle	Event
Grand Prix Circuit (2004–present): 5.390 km (3.349 mi)
GP2 Asia	1:41.220	Kamui Kobayashi	Dallara GP2/05	2008 2nd Dubai GP2 Asia Series round
LMP2	1:46.306	Franco Colapinto	Aurus 01	2021 4 Hours of Dubai Race 2
A1GP	1:46.497	Ralph Firman	Lola A1GP	2005 Dubai A1GP round
LMP1	1:48.528	Emmanuel Collard	Pescarolo 01	2022 Gulf Historic Dubai Grand Prix Revival
LMP3	1:53.651	Kay van Berlo	Ligier JS P3	2018 3x3H Dubai Race 2
Formula One	1:53.947	Stuart Hall	March 821	2023 Gulf Historic Dubai Grand Prix Revival
Formula Regional	1:54.885	Maximilian Popov	Tatuus T-326	2026 Dubai Formula Regional Middle East round
Formula Renault 3.5	1:54.926	Christian Montanari	Tatuus FRV6	2004 Dubai Formula Renault V6 Eurocup round
GT1 (GTS)	1:55.621	Jean-Denis Delétraz	Aston Martin DBR9	2006 FIA GT Dubai 500km
FIA Group 2	1:55.902	Gabriele Gardel	Ferrari 550 Maranello Evo	2006 FIA GT Dubai 500km
GT3	1:56.358	Ben Barnicoat	McLaren 720S GT3	2022 4 Hours of Dubai Race 2
MRF Challenge	1:57.038	Max Defourny	Dallara Formulino Pro	2018 Dubai MRF Challenge round
Lamborghini Super Trofeo	1:59.918	Brendon Leitch	Lamborghini Huracán LP 620-2 Super Trofeo Evo 2	2026 Dubai 24 Hour
Porsche Carrera Cup	2:00.273	Mathys Jaubert	Porsche 911 (992 I) GT3 Cup	2026 Dubai 24 Hour
Formula 4	2:00.536	Dilano van 't Hoff	Tatuus F4-T014	2021 3rd Dubai Formula 4 UAE round
GT2	2:01.387	Tim Mullen	Ferrari F430 GT2	2006 FIA GT Dubai 500km
Ferrari Challenge	2:02.552	Roman Ziemian	Ferrari 488 Challenge Evo	2022 Dubai Ferrari Challenge Asia-Pacific round
Radical Cup	2:02.934	Harry Hannam	Radical SR3 XXR	2025 5th Dubai Gulf Radical Cup round
N-GT	2:03.426	Sascha Maassen	Porsche 911 (996) GT3-RSR	2004 FIA GT Dubai 500km
Stock car racing	2:05.910	Heinz-Harald Frentzen	Speedcar V8	2008 3rd Dubai Speedcar Series round
GT4	2:06.702	Keith Gatehouse	Mercedes AMG GT4	2023 3rd Dubai Gulf ProCar round
TCR Touring Car	2:10.287	René Münnich	Honda Civic Type R TCR (FK8)	2019 2nd Dubai TCR Middle East Series round
Super 2000	2:12.285	Augusto Farfus (Note: Both drivers took the same lap time in both races of this round.); Gabriele Tarquini	Alfa Romeo 156 GTA Super 2000	2004 Dubai ETCC round
Renault Clio Cup	2:23.386	Jerzy Spinkiewicz	Renault Clio RS V	2023 1st Dubai Renault Clio Cup Middle East round
International Circuit (2004–present): 4.290 km (2.666 mi)
GP2 Asia	1:22.453	Romain Grosjean	Dallara GP2/05	2008 1st Dubai GP2 Asia Series round
Formula Regional	1:35.055	Hadrien David	Tatuus F3 T-318	2022 1st Dubai FR Asia round
Formula 4	1:37.839	Logan Sargeant	Tatuus F4-T014	2017 1st Dubai Formula 4 UAE round
Porsche Carrera Cup	1:38.286	Ghislain Cordeel	Porsche 911 (992 I) GT3 Cup	2023 Dubai Porsche Sprint Challenge Middle East round
Radical Cup	1:40.133	Sebastian Murray	Radical SR3 XXR	2025 1st Dubai Gulf Radical Cup round
Stock car racing	1:42.438	Jean Alesi	Speedcar V8	2009 Dubai Speedcar Series round
TCR Touring Car	1:45.236	Luca Engstler	Volkswagen Golf GTI TCR	2018 Dubai TCR Middle East Series round
SEAT León Supercopa	1:51.107	Costas Papantonis	SEAT León Cupra R	2012 2nd Dubai UAE GT round
Renault Clio Cup	1:56.685	Jerzy Spinkiewicz	Renault Clio RS V	2022 3rd Dubai Renault Clio Cup Middle East round
National Circuit (2004–present): 3.560 km (2.212 mi)
Formula 4	1:21.997	Jonathan Aberdein	Tatuus F4-T014	2016–2017 1st Dubai Formula 4 UAE round
GT3	1:24.503	Vasily Vladykin	Audi R8 GT3 Evo 2	2024 3rd Dubai Gulf Procar round
Radical Cup	1:24.747	Ian Aguilera	Radical SR3 XXR	2024 4th Dubai Gulf Radical Cup round
Porsche Carrera Cup	1:27.563	Alex Giannone	Porsche 911 (992 I) GT3 Cup	2024 3rd Dubai Gulf Procar round
TCR Touring Car	1:28.733	Pepe Oriola	SEAT León TCR	2017 TCR International Series Dubai round
Supersport	1:29.383	Simon Reid	Kawasaki Ninja ZX-6R	2025 1st Dubai DSBK round
GT4	1:34.670	Henry Clausnitzer	Porsche 981 Cayman GT4	2026 3rd Dubai Gulf ProCar round
Renault Clio Cup	1:38.579	Jerzy Spinkiewicz	Renault Clio RS V	2022 2nd Dubai Renault Clio Cup Middle East round

== Fatal accidents ==
No.	Competitor	Date	Course	Section	Race	Event	Machine
1	(Belgium) Christophe Hissette	April 2010		Turn 16		Qualifying session	Radical SR3
2	(Switzerland) Pascal Grosjean	27 Nov 2010		Finish	2010 Sportsbike Championship race	UAE Sportbike 600cc championship	Sportbike 600cc
3	(Italy) Federico Fratelli	January 2018		Turn 14	2018 Sportsbike Championship race	UAE Sportbike 600cc championship	Sportbike 600cc
