= 2026–27 Asian Le Mans Cup =

Sports car racing series

The 2026–27 Asian Le Mans Cup will be the inaugural season of the Asian Le Mans Cup. Created in the wake of the Asian Le Mans Series' introduction of Pro-Am Hypercars and its removal of the LMP3 class, it is a support series to AsLMS. The three-event series will begin at Circuit Paul Ricard on 14 November and conclude at the Algarve International Circuit on 21 February.

The series is open to Le Mans Prototypes in the LMP3 category and grand tourer sports cars in the GT3 class, mirroring the Le Mans Cup.

== Calendar ==
The calendar for the inaugural Asian Le Mans Cup season was announced by the Automobile Club de l'Ouest on 3 August 2026. As a result of the 2026 Iran war, the series was unable to be held in Asia and moved to Europe. It will comprise six two-hour long races, run at Paul Ricard, Jerez and Portimão on the same weekends as the Asian Le Mans Series.

Rnd	Circuit	Location	Date
1	(France) Circuit Paul Ricard	Le Castellet, Var, France	14 November 2026
2	(France) Circuit Paul Ricard	Le Castellet, Var, France	15 November 2026
3	(Spain) Circuito de Jerez	Jerez de la Frontera, Andalusia, Spain	16 January 2027
4	(Spain) Circuito de Jerez	Jerez de la Frontera, Andalusia, Spain	17 January 2027
5	(Portugal) Algarve International Circuit	Portimão, Algarve, Portugal	20 February 2027
6	(Portugal) Algarve International Circuit	Portimão, Algarve, Portugal	21 February 2027
Map of circuit locations
2026–27 Asian Le Mans Cup is located in Europe

== Entries ==
=== LMP3 ===
All cars in the LMP3 class use the Toyota V35A-FTS 3.5 L twin-turbo V6 engine and Michelin tyres. Entries are divided into the LMP3 Pro and LMP3 classes, the latter accommodating teams with a Bronze-rated driver in their line-up.

Entrant/Team	Chassis	No.	MISC	Drivers	Rounds
(Germany) GMS Team	Ligier JS P325	11	P	(Germany) Sven Barth	1–2
(Germany) GMS Team	Ligier JS P325	11	P	(United States) Danny Soufi	1–2
(Germany) GMS Team	Duqueine D09	75	P	(Germany) Valentino Catalano	1–2
(Germany) GMS Team	Duqueine D09	75	P	(Colombia) Óscar Tunjo	1–2
(Spain) Brutal Fish Campos Racing	Ligier JS P325	12	P3	(Switzerland) Kévin Rabin	1–2
(Spain) Brutal Fish Campos Racing	Ligier JS P325	12	P3	(Denmark) Morten Strømsted	1–2
(Switzerland) CLX Motorsport	Ligier JS P325	17	P	(Brazil) Lucas Fecury	1–2
(Switzerland) CLX Motorsport	Ligier JS P325	17	P	(Brazil) João Vergara	1–2
(Switzerland) CLX Motorsport	Ligier JS P325	86	P3	(France) Louis Iglesias	1–2
(Switzerland) CLX Motorsport	Ligier JS P325	86	P3	(Switzerland) Laurent Wuthrich	1–2
(Switzerland) CLX Motorsport	Ligier JS P325	87	P3	(Belgium) Vic Stevens	1–2
(Switzerland) CLX Motorsport	Ligier JS P325	87	P3	(United Kingdom) Terrence Woodward	1–2
(France) 23Events Racing	Ligier JS P325	19	P	(Brazil) Pipo Massa	1–2
(France) 23Events Racing	Ligier JS P325	19	P	(United States) Grant Mitchell	1–2
(France) 23Events Racing	Ligier JS P325	50	P	(Italy) Giovanni Maschio	1–2
(France) 23Events Racing	Ligier JS P325	50	P	(United States) Colin Queen	1–2
(Czech Republic) Bretton Racing	Ligier JS P325	26	P	(United Kingdom) Emily Cotty	1–2
(Czech Republic) Bretton Racing	Ligier JS P325	26	P	(Australia) Calan Williams	1–2
(France) R-ace GP	Duqueine D09	85	P	(South Korea) Kyuho Lee	1–2
(France) R-ace GP	Duqueine D09	85	P	(France) Luciano Morano	1–2
(Poland) Team Virage	Ligier JS P325	92	P	(Switzerland) Samuel Ifrid	1–2
(Poland) Team Virage	Ligier JS P325	92	P	(Switzerland) Max Kammerlander	1–2
(Belgium) Motorsport98	Ligier JS P325	98	P3	(Belgium) Eric De Doncker	1–2
(Belgium) Motorsport98	Ligier JS P325	98	P3	(France) Gillian Henrion	1–2

Icon	MISC
P	LMP3 Pro
P3	LMP3

=== GT3 ===
Entrant/Team	Car	Engine	No.	Drivers	Rounds
(France) Racing Spirit of Léman	Aston Martin Vantage AMR GT3 Evo	Aston Martin M177 4.0 L Turbo V8	10	(Mexico) Esteban González Beckmann	1–2
(France) Racing Spirit of Léman	Aston Martin Vantage AMR GT3 Evo	Aston Martin M177 4.0 L Turbo V8	10	(Colombia) Sebastián Moreno	1–2
(Austria) Razoon – more than racing	Porsche 911 GT3 R (992.2)	Porsche M97/80 4.2 L Flat-6	41	(Austria) Dominik Olbert	TBC
(Austria) Razoon – more than racing	Porsche 911 GT3 R (992.2)	Porsche M97/80 4.2 L Flat-6	41	TBA	TBC
(Italy) AF Corse	Ferrari 296 GT3 Evo	Ferrari F163CE 3.0 L Turbo V6	51	TBA	TBC
(Italy) AF Corse	Ferrari 296 GT3 Evo	Ferrari F163CE 3.0 L Turbo V6	51	TBA	TBC
(Germany) Herberth Motorsport	Porsche 911 GT3 R (992.2)	Porsche M97/80 4.2 L Flat-6	73	(Germany) Jörg Dreisow	1–2
(Germany) Herberth Motorsport	Porsche 911 GT3 R (992.2)	Porsche M97/80 4.2 L Flat-6	73	(Germany) Manuel Lauck	1–2
(Germany) Herberth Motorsport	Porsche 911 GT3 R (992.2)	Porsche M97/80 4.2 L Flat-6	91	(Germany) Ralf Bohn	1–2
(Germany) Herberth Motorsport	Porsche 911 GT3 R (992.2)	Porsche M97/80 4.2 L Flat-6	91	(Germany) Alfred Renauer	1–2
(Spain) E2P Racing	Aston Martin Vantage AMR GT3 Evo	Aston Martin M177 4.0 L Turbo V8	90	(Spain) Pablo Burguera	1–2
(Spain) E2P Racing	Aston Martin Vantage AMR GT3 Evo	Aston Martin M177 4.0 L Turbo V8	90	(Spain) Antonio Sainero	1–2

== Results ==
Bold indicates overall winner.

Round	Circuit	LMP3 Pro Winning Team	LMP3 Winning Team	GT3 Winning Team
Round	Circuit	LMP3 Pro Winning Drivers	LMP3 Winning Drivers	GT3 Winning Drivers
1	(France) Paul Ricard	**(Germany) No. 75 Gebhardt Motorsport**	(Switzerland) No. 86 CLX Motorsport	(Germany) No. 91 Herberth Motorsport
1	(France) Paul Ricard	**(Germany) Valentino Catalano** **(Colombia) Óscar Tunjo**	(France) Louis Iglesias (Switzerland) Laurent Wuthrich	(Germany) Ralf Bohn (Germany) Alfred Renauer
2	(France) Paul Ricard	**(Germany) No. 75 Gebhardt Motorsport**	(Switzerland) No. 87 CLX Motorsport	(France) No. 10 Racing Spirit of Léman
2	(France) Paul Ricard	**(Germany) Valentino Catalano** **(Colombia) Óscar Tunjo**	(Belgium) Vic Stevens (United Kingdom) Terrence Woodward	(Mexico) Esteban González Beckmann (Colombia) Sebastián Moreno
3	(Spain) Jerez			
4	(Spain) Jerez			
5	(Portugal) Algarve			
6	(Portugal) Algarve			

== Teams Championships ==
==== LMP3 Pro Teams Championship ====
Pos.	Team	Car	LEC (France)		JER (Spain)	POR (Portugal)	Points
1	(Germany) #75 GMS Team	Duqueine D09	1	1			50
2	(France) #85 R-ace GP	Duqueine D09	3	2			33
3	(France) #50 23Events Racing	Ligier JS P325	**2**	**4**			32
4	(Germany) #11 GMS Team	Ligier JS P325	4	5			22
5	(Poland) #92 Team Virage	Ligier JS P325	8	3			19
6	(France) #19 23Events Racing	Ligier JS P325	6	6			16
7	(Czech Republic) #26 Bretton Racing	Ligier JS P325	5	8			14
8	(Switzerland) #17 CLX Motorsport	Ligier JS P325	7	7			12

Key
Colour	Result
Gold	Race winner
Silver	2nd place
Bronze	3rd place
Green	Points finish
Blue	Non-points finish
Blue	Non-classified finish (NC)
Purple	Did not finish (Ret)
Black	Disqualified (DSQ)
Black	Excluded (EX)
White	Did not start (DNS)
White	Race cancelled (C)
White	Withdrew (WD)
Blank	Did not participate

**Bold** – Pole

Italics – Fastest Lap

==== LMP3 Teams Championship ====
Pos.	Team	Car	LEC (France)		JER (Spain)	POR (Portugal)	Points
1	(Switzerland) #86 CLX Motorsport	Ligier JS P325	**1**	**2**			45
2	(Switzerland) #87 CLX Motorsport	Ligier JS P325	2	1			43
3	(Spain) #12 Brutal Fish Campos Racing	Ligier JS P325	3	3			30
4	(Belgium) #98 Motorsport98	Ligier JS P325	4	4			24

==== GT3 Teams Championship ====
Pos.	Team	Car	LEC (France)		JER (Spain)	POR (Portugal)	Points
1	(France) #10 Racing Spirit of Léman	Aston Martin Vantage AMR GT3 Evo	3	**1**			41
2	(Spain) #90 E2P Racing	Aston Martin Vantage AMR GT3 Evo	2	3			33
3	(Germany) #73 Herberth Motorsport	Porsche 911 GT3 R (992.2)	4	2			30
4	(Germany) #91 Herberth Motorsport	Porsche 911 GT3 R (992.2.)	**1**	DSQ			26

== Drivers Championships ==
==== LMP3 Pro Drivers Championship ====
Pos.	Drivers	Team	LEC (France)		JER (Spain)	POR (Portugal)	Points
1	(Germany) Valentino Catalano	(Germany) GMS Team	1	1			50
1	(Colombia) Óscar Tunjo	(Germany) GMS Team	1	1			50
2	(South Korea) Kyuho Lee	(France) R-ace GP	3	2			33
2	(France) Luciano Morano	(France) R-ace GP	3	2			33
3	(Italy) Giovanni Maschio	(France) 23Events Racing	**2**	**4**			32
3	(United States) Colin Queen	(France) 23Events Racing	**2**	**4**			32
4	(Germany) Sven Barth	(Germany) GMS Team	4	5			22
4	(United States) Danny Soufi	(Germany) GMS Team	4	5			22
5	(Switzerland) Samuel Ifrid	(Poland) Team Virage	8	3			19
5	(Switzerland) Max Kammerlander	(Poland) Team Virage	8	3			19
6	(Brazil) Pipo Massa	(France) 23Events Racing	6	6			16
6	(United States) Grant Mitchell	(France) 23Events Racing	6	6			16
7	(United Kingdom) Emily Cotty	(Czech Republic) Bretton Racing	5	8			14
7	(Australia) Calan Williams	(Czech Republic) Bretton Racing	5	8			14
8	(Brazil) Lucas Fecury	(Switzerland) CLX Motorsport	7	7			12
8	(Brazil) João Vergara	(Switzerland) CLX Motorsport	7	7			12

Key
Colour	Result
Gold	Race winner
Silver	2nd place
Bronze	3rd place
Green	Points finish
Blue	Non-points finish
Blue	Non-classified finish (NC)
Purple	Did not finish (Ret)
Black	Disqualified (DSQ)
Black	Excluded (EX)
White	Did not start (DNS)
White	Race cancelled (C)
White	Withdrew (WD)
Blank	Did not participate

**Bold** – Pole

Italics – Fastest Lap

==== LMP3 Drivers Championship ====
Pos.	Drivers	Team	LEC (France)		JER (Spain)	POR (Portugal)	Points
1	(France) Louis Iglesias	(Switzerland) CLX Motorsport	**1**	**2**			45
1	(Switzerland) Laurent Wuthrich	(Switzerland) CLX Motorsport	**1**	**2**			45
2	(Belgium) Vic Stevens	(Switzerland) CLX Motorsport	2	1			43
2	(United Kingdom) Terence Woodward	(Switzerland) CLX Motorsport	2	1			43
3	(Switzerland) Kévin Rabin	(Spain) Brutal Fish Campos Racing	3	3			30
3	(Denmark) Morten Strømsted	(Spain) Brutal Fish Campos Racing	3	3			30
4	(Belgium) Eric De Doncker	(Belgium) Motorsport98	4	4			24
4	(France) Gillian Henrion	(Belgium) Motorsport98	4	4			24

==== GT3 Drivers Championship ====
Pos.	Drivers	Team	LEC (France)		JER (Spain)	POR (Portugal)	Points
1	(Mexico) Esteban González Beckmann	(France) Racing Spirit of Léman	3	**1**			41
1	(Colombia) Sebastián Moreno	(France) Racing Spirit of Léman	3	**1**			41
2	(Spain) Pablo Burguera	(Spain) E2P Racing	2	3			33
2	(Spain) Antonio Sainero	(Spain) E2P Racing	2	3			33
3	(Germany) Jörg Dreisow	(Germany) Herberth Motorsport	4	2			30
3	(Germany) Manuel Lauck	(Germany) Herberth Motorsport	4	2			30
4	(Germany) Ralf Bohn	(Germany) Herberth Motorsport	**1**	DSQ			26
4	(Germany) Alfred Renauer	(Germany) Herberth Motorsport	**1**	DSQ			26
