= 2023 GB4 Championship =

Second season of motor racing championship

The 2023 GB4 Championship partnered by the BRDC was the second season of a motor racing championship for open wheel, formula racing cars in Britain. The 2023 season, which had been organised by MotorSport Vision, was run over seven triple-header rounds.

GB4 will act as a direct feeder series to higher open-wheel categories, including the existing GB3 Championship partnered by the BRDC. GB4 will run primarily on the same British GT race programme as GB3, and retain many of the same championship partners.

== Teams and drivers ==
Team	No.	Driver	Rounds
(United Kingdom) KMR Sport	3	(Australia) Jack Clifford	All
(United Kingdom) KMR Sport	21	(United Kingdom) Tom Mills	1–6
(United Kingdom) KMR Sport	87	(United States) Jeremy Fairbairn	1–3
(United Kingdom) KMR Sport	88	(United Kingdom) Lucas Blakeley	4, 7
(United Kingdom) Oldfield Motorsport	4	(United States) Jason Conzo	1–2
(United Kingdom) Rossoverde Racing	5	(United Kingdom) Christian Lester	2
(Australia) Evans GP	8	(India) Kai Daryanani	3, 6
(Australia) Evans GP	37	(Australia) Cooper Webster	All
(Australia) Evans GP	56	(United States) Thomas Lee	All
(United Kingdom) Fortec Motorsport	10	(United Kingdom) Dan Hickey	7
(United Kingdom) Fortec Motorsport	15	(India) Aditya Kulkarni	3–7
(United Kingdom) Fortec Motorsport	23	(India) Aditya Kulkarni	1–2
(United Kingdom) Fortec Motorsport	27	(India) Ruhaan Alva	1–5
(United Kingdom) Fortec Motorsport	62	(United States) Colin Queen	All
(United States) Velocity Racing Development	14	(United States) Erik Evans	5
(United States) Velocity Racing Development	97	(United States) Zack Ping	5–7
(United Kingdom) Elite Motorsport	16	(United Kingdom) Josh Irfan	1, 3, 6
(United Kingdom) Elite Motorsport	17	(United Kingdom) Harri Reynolds	1–3
(United Kingdom) Elite Motorsport	18	(United Kingdom) Finn Harrison	7
(United Kingdom) Elite Motorsport	19	(United Kingdom) Theo Micouris	7
(United Kingdom) Fox Motorsport	48	(United Kingdom) Liam McNeilly	All
(United Kingdom) Fox Motorsport	99	(United Kingdom) Sid Smith	All
(United Kingdom) Dylan Hotchin Racing	50	(United Kingdom) Dylan Hotchin	All
(United Kingdom) Graham Brunton Racing	68	(United Kingdom) Harry Burgoyne Jr.	All
(United Kingdom) Graham Brunton Racing	87	(United States) Jeremy Fairbairn	4
(United Kingdom) Graham Brunton Racing	91	(United Arab Emirates) Sebastian Murray	6–7
(United Kingdom) Belk Racing	98	(United Kingdom) Lexie Belk	7

== Race calendar and results ==
The provisional calendar was announced on 15 October 2022. The championship will support the British GT championship at six of its seven meetings.

Round		Circuit	Date	Pole position	Fastest lap	Winning driver	Winning team
1	R1	Oulton Park (International Circuit, Cheshire)	8 April	(United Kingdom) Tom Mills	(United Kingdom) Liam McNeilly	(United States) Jeremy Fairbairn	(United Kingdom) KMR Sport
1	R2	Oulton Park (International Circuit, Cheshire)	10 April	(United Kingdom) Tom Mills	(United Kingdom) Tom Mills	(United Kingdom) Tom Mills	(United Kingdom) KMR Sport
1	R3	Oulton Park (International Circuit, Cheshire)	10 April		(United Kingdom) Liam McNeilly	(United Kingdom) Liam McNeilly	(United Kingdom) Fox Motorsport
2	R4	Silverstone Circuit (Grand Prix Circuit, Northamptonshire)	6 May	(United Kingdom) Tom Mills	race cancelled due to weather conditions, rescheduled to 27 May		
2	R5	Silverstone Circuit (Grand Prix Circuit, Northamptonshire)	7 May	(United Kingdom) Tom Mills	(United Kingdom) Tom Mills	(United Kingdom) Tom Mills	(United Kingdom) KMR Sport
2	R6	Silverstone Circuit (Grand Prix Circuit, Northamptonshire)	7 May		(United Kingdom) Harri Reynolds	(United Kingdom) Harri Reynolds	(United Kingdom) Elite Motorsport
3	R4	Donington Park (Grand Prix Circuit, Leicestershire)	27 May	(United Kingdom) Tom Mills	(Australia) Cooper Webster	(United Kingdom) Tom Mills	(United Kingdom) KMR Sport
3	R7	Donington Park (Grand Prix Circuit, Leicestershire)	27 May	(United Kingdom) Tom Mills	(United States) Colin Queen	(United Kingdom) Tom Mills	(United Kingdom) KMR Sport
3	R8	Donington Park (Grand Prix Circuit, Leicestershire)	28 May	(United States) Colin Queen	(United Kingdom) Tom Mills	(United Kingdom) Tom Mills	(United Kingdom) KMR Sport
3	R9	Donington Park (Grand Prix Circuit, Leicestershire)	28 May		(United Kingdom) Tom Mills	(United Kingdom) Liam McNeilly	(United Kingdom) Fox Motorsport
4	R10	Snetterton Circuit (300 Circuit, Norfolk)	17–18 June	(Australia) Cooper Webster	(Australia) Cooper Webster	(Australia) Cooper Webster	(Australia) Evans GP
4	R11	Snetterton Circuit (300 Circuit, Norfolk)	17–18 June	(Australia) Cooper Webster	(Australia) Cooper Webster	(United Kingdom) Tom Mills	(United Kingdom) KMR Sport
4	R12	Snetterton Circuit (300 Circuit, Norfolk)	17–18 June		(Australia) Cooper Webster	(Australia) Cooper Webster	(Australia) Evans GP
5	R13	Silverstone Circuit (Grand Prix Circuit, Northamptonshire)	29–30 July	(United Kingdom) Tom Mills	(United Kingdom) Tom Mills	(United Kingdom) Tom Mills	(United Kingdom) KMR Sport
5	R14	Silverstone Circuit (Grand Prix Circuit, Northamptonshire)	29–30 July	(United Kingdom) Tom Mills	(United Kingdom) Tom Mills	(United Kingdom) Tom Mills	(United Kingdom) KMR Sport
5	R15	Silverstone Circuit (Grand Prix Circuit, Northamptonshire)	29–30 July		race cancelled due to adverse weather conditions		
6	R16	Brands Hatch (Grand Prix Circuit, Kent)	9–10 September	(United Kingdom) Tom Mills	(Australia) Cooper Webster	(United Kingdom) Tom Mills	(United Kingdom) KMR Sport
6	R17	Brands Hatch (Grand Prix Circuit, Kent)	9–10 September	(United Kingdom) Tom Mills	(United Kingdom) Tom Mills	(United Kingdom) Tom Mills	(United Kingdom) KMR Sport
6	R18	Brands Hatch (Grand Prix Circuit, Kent)	9–10 September		(United Kingdom) Liam McNeilly	(India) Kai Daryanani	(Australia) Evans GP
7	R19	Donington Park (Grand Prix Circuit, Leicestershire)	21–22 October	(Australia) Cooper Webster	(United Kingdom) Liam McNeilly	(Australia) Cooper Webster	(Australia) Evans GP
7	R20	Donington Park (Grand Prix Circuit, Leicestershire)	21–22 October	(Australia) Cooper Webster	(Australia) Cooper Webster	(Australia) Cooper Webster	(Australia) Evans GP
7	R21	Donington Park (Grand Prix Circuit, Leicestershire)	21–22 October		(United States) Colin Queen	(Australia) Cooper Webster	(Australia) Evans GP

== Championship standings ==
Scoring system

Points were awarded to the top 20 classified finishers in races one and two, with the third race awarding points to only the top 15. Race three, which had its grid formed by reversing the qualifying order, awarded extra points for positions gained from the drivers' respective starting positions.

Races	Position, points per race																			
Races	1st	2nd	3rd	4th	5th	6th	7th	8th	9th	10th	11th	12th	13th	14th	15th	16th	17th	18th	19th	20th
Races 1 & 2	35	29	24	21	19	17	15	13	12	11	10	9	8	7	6	5	4	3	2	1
Race 3	20	17	15	13	11	10	9	8	7	6	5	4	3	2	1					

=== Drivers' championship ===
Pos	Driver	OUL			SIL1			DON1				SNE			SIL2			BRH			DON2			Pts
Pos	Driver	R1	R2	R3	R1	R2	R3	R1	R2	R3	R4	R1	R2	R3	R1	R2	R3	R1	R2	R3	R1	R2	R3	Pts
1	(United Kingdom) Tom Mills	**2**	**1**	6^{7}	**C**	**1**	3^{8}	**1**	**1**	1	4^{9}	2	1	3^{7}	**1**	**1**	C	**1**	**1**	7^{4}				505
2	(Australia) Cooper Webster	3	11	9^{2}	C	3	Ret	2	2	2	2^{9}	**1**	**2**	1^{10}	4	2	C	3	2	4^{4}	**1**	**1**	1^{10}	494
3	(United Kingdom) Liam McNeilly	6	2	1^{8}	C	7	5^{2}	6	4	8	1^{7}	5	4	10	2	3	C	2	3	3^{7}	2	3	7^{3}	419
4	(United States) Colin Queen	4	Ret	3^{7}	C	2	4^{6}	3	3	**3**	13	3	3	5^{4}	3	4	C	4	9	12	7	2	2^{7}	379
5	(India) Aditya Kulkarni	11	7	11	C	11	7	11	9	6	3^{4}	10	6	2	7	7	C	8	10	2	9	8	3^{3}	256
6	(United Kingdom) Harry Burgoyne Jr.	9	5	8	C	8	10^{2}	7	10	9	5	4	8	9	9	8	C	7	6	Ret	5	6	4	256
7	(Australia) Jack Clifford	8	10	10	C	6	6	8	7	Ret	9	8	11	4	5	6	C	10	8	8	13	Ret	13	207
8	(United Kingdom) Sid Smith	13	Ret	5	C	9	Ret	5	12	7	7	9	5	Ret	8	10	C	6	5	5	8	Ret	11	203
9	(United States) Jeremy Fairbairn	1	6	12	C	5	9	4	5	4	6	7	9	6										190
10	(India) Ruhaan Alva	7	Ret	7	C	14	2	10	8	5	14	6	10	8	6	5	C							165
11	(United Kingdom) Dylan Hotchin	14	8	13^{1}	C	13	12^{1}	13	DNS	Ret	Ret	12	12	Ret	12	11	C	12	12	10^{3}	10	10	Ret	132
12	(United Kingdom) Harri Reynolds	10	4	2^{5}	C	4	1^{5}	9	13	Ret	11													125
13	(United Kingdom) Josh Irfan	5	3	4^{4}					6	Ret	10							5	7	Ret				117
14	(United States) Thomas Lee	15	DNS	DNS	C	Ret	Ret	12	14	11	12^{3}	13	13	DSQ	13	12	C	14	13	11^{3}	12	Ret	12^{4}	113
15	(United Kingdom) Lucas Blakeley											11	7	7^{1}							3	5	5	89
16	(United States) Zack Ping														10	Ret	C	13	4	6^{3}	4	Ret	Ret	74
17	(United Arab Emirates) Sebastian Murray																	11	11	9^{3}	11	9	9^{3}	62
18	(India) Kai Daryanani								11	10	8							9	Ret	1				61
19	(United Kingdom) Theo Micouris																				6	7	6^{2}	44
20	(United States) Jason Conzo	12	9	Ret	C	10	8																	40
21	(United Kingdom) Finn Harrison																				Ret	4	8	29
22	(United States) Erik Evans														11	9	C							22
23	(United Kingdom) Christian Lester				C	12	11^{4}																	18
24	(United Kingdom) Lexie Belk																				Ret	11	14^{1}	13
25	(United Kingdom) Dan Hickey																				Ret	Ret	10^{4}	10
Pos	Driver	R1	R2	R3	R1	R2	R3	R1	R2	R3	R4	R1	R2	R3	R1	R2	R3	R1	R2	R3	R1	R2	R3	Pts
Pos	Driver	OUL			SIL1			DON1				SNE			SIL2			BRH			DON2			Pts

Colour	Result
Gold	Winner
Silver	Second place
Bronze	Third place
Green	Points classification
Blue	Non-points classification
Blue	Non-classified finish (NC)
Purple	Retired, not classified (Ret)
Red	Did not qualify (DNQ)
Red	Did not pre-qualify (DNPQ)
Black	Disqualified (DSQ)
White	Did not start (DNS)
White	Withdrew (WD)
White	Race cancelled (C)
Blank	Did not practice (DNP)
Blank	Did not arrive (DNA)
Blank	Excluded (EX)

**Bold** – Pole

Italics – Fastest Lap

=== Teams' championship ===
Pos.	Team	Points
1	(United Kingdom) KMR Sport	837
2	(United Kingdom) Fortec Motorsport	678
3	(Australia) Evans GP	629
4	(United Kingdom) Fox Motorsport	622
5	(United Kingdom) Graham Brunton Racing	355
6	(United Kingdom) Elite Motorsport	315
7	(United Kingdom) Dylan Hotchin Racing	132
8	(United States) Velocity Racing Development	96
9	(United Kingdom) Oldfield Motorsport	40
10	(United Kingdom) Rossoverde Racing	18
11	(United Kingdom) Belk Racing	13
