= Colin Queen =

American racing driver (born 2004)

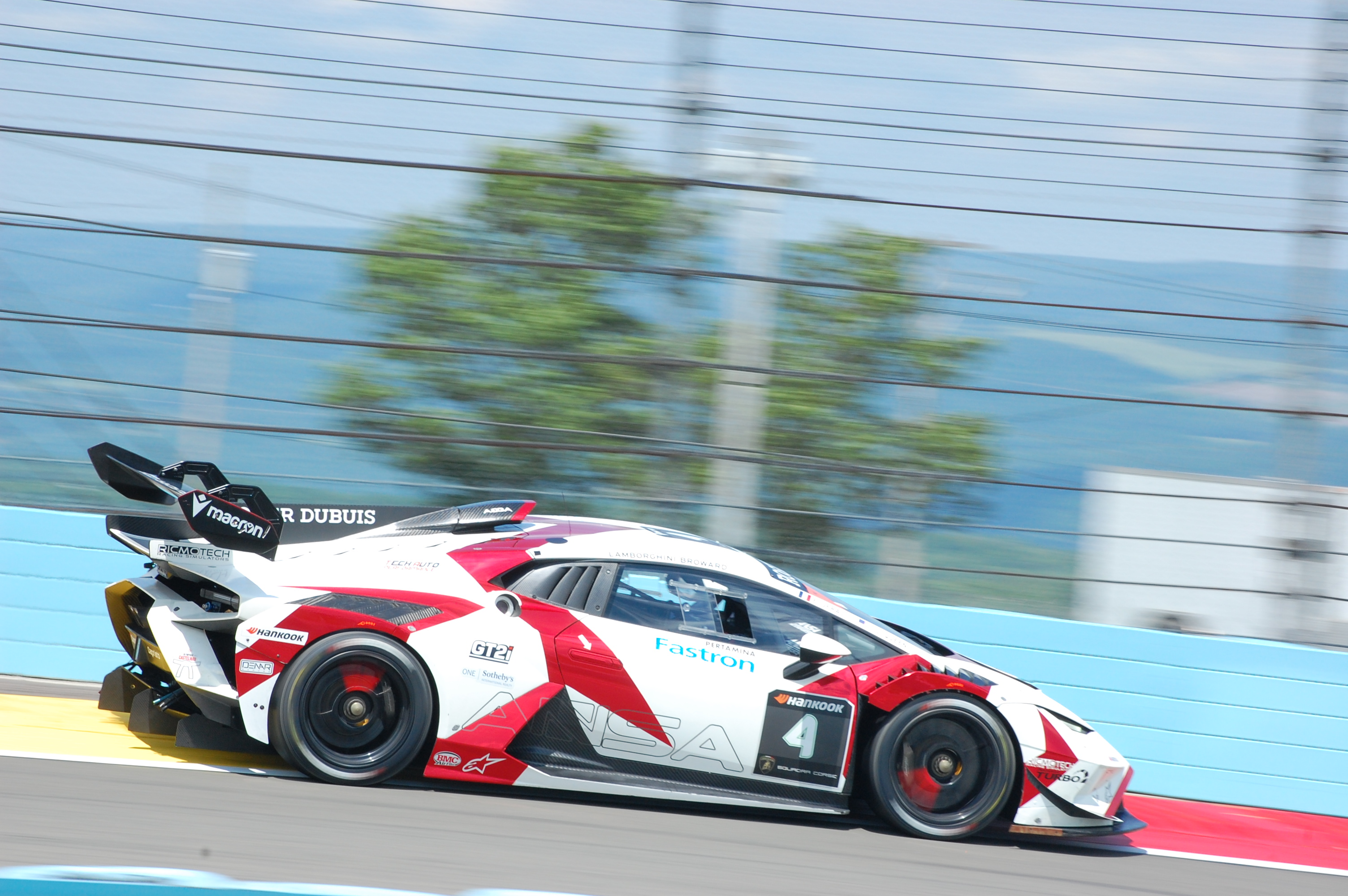
- Queen driving the Huracán EVO2 during the 2025 Lamborghini Super Trofeo North America
- Nationality: (United States) American
- Born: December 13, 2004 (age 21) Los Angeles, California, U.S.

Lamborghini Super Trofeo North America career
- Debut season: 2025
- Current team: ANSA Motorsports
- Categorisation: FIA Silver
- Car number: 4
- Starts: 24
- Wins: 0
- Podiums: 4
- Poles: 0
- Fastest laps: 0
- Best finish: 5th in 2025

Previous series
- 2025 2024 2023 2022 2021–2022: Nürburgring Langstrecken-Serie; GB3 Championship; GB4 Championship; United Formula Ford Championship – Star Class; BRSCC National Formula Ford Championship

Colin Queen (born December 13, 2004) is an American racing driver who last competed in the LMP3 class of the Le Mans Cup for 23Events Racing, as well as in Lamborghini Super Trofeo North America for ANSA Motorsports with support from Lamborghini.

== Early life ==
Queen was born with hypoplastic left heart syndrome, a congenital heart defect, and underwent three surgeries and various other medical procedures in his early life. According to Queen, this has resulted him needing to "overcome a little bit more obstacles than most, especially on the physical side of things. It took a lot of years to build up my muscles and endurance, but, you know, I'm a full-blown athlete now".

== Racing career ==
=== Karting (2012–2018) ===
Queen began karting at the age of seven, most notably representing the USA in the Karting Academy Trophy during his final year of karting in 2018, after being selected by the World Karting Association.

=== Formula Ford (2021–2022) ===
After testing Formula Ford machinery in 2020, Queen made his single-seater debut the following year, by racing in the BRSCC National Formula Ford Championship for Low Dempsey Racing. Switching to Ammonite Motorsport for the 2022 season, Queen took three wins and nine other podiums to secure runner-up honors in the standings.

=== GB4 / GB3 (2023–2024) ===
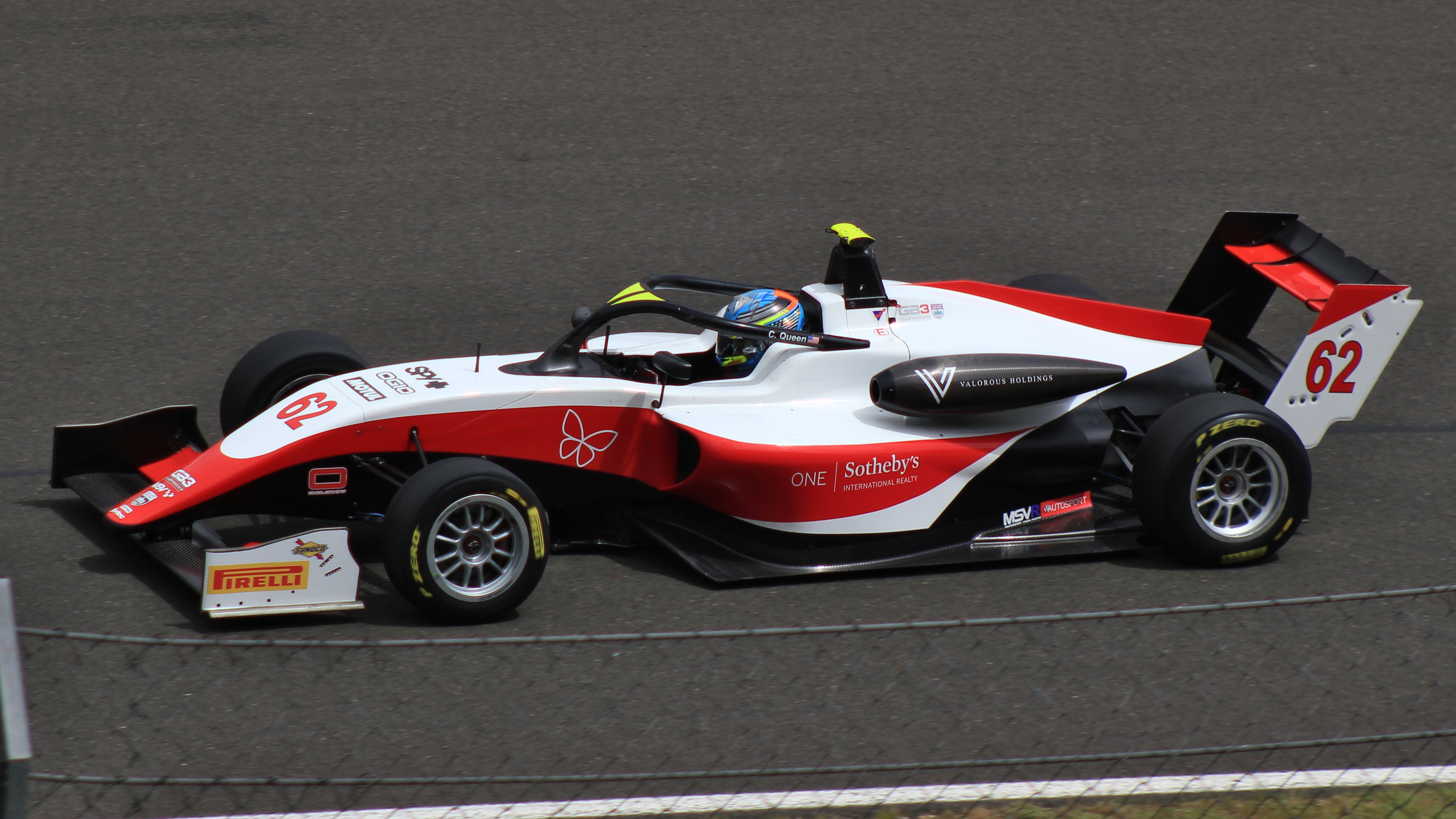
Queen racing for Fortec Motorsport at the Hungaroring round of the 2024 GB3 Championship

At the end of 2022, Queen won a £20,000 scholarship to use towards the following year's GB4 campaign, which he contested with Fortec Motorsport. In his first season with the team, Queen took a best result of second three times across the first Silverstone and second Donington Park rounds, as well as seven third-place finishes to secure fourth overall. Remaining with Fortec for 2024, Queen raced with them in GB3, in which he scored a best result of fourth in race two at Zandvoort to end the season 14th in the overall points.

== Sportscar racing career ==
Switching to sportscars for 2025, Queen joined ANSA Motorsports to compete in the Pro class of Lamborghini Super Trofeo America alongside Enzo Geraci. In his first season in the series, Queen scored a best result of third three times, doing so at Laguna Seca, Watkins Glen and Misano to end the year fifth in points. After that, Queen remained at Misano for the Lamborghini Super Trofeo World Finals, in which he finished on the Pro class podium in race two and was fifth in the standings at the end of the weekend. Following the World Finals, Queen won the Lamborghini Super Trofeo Young Driver Shootout, earning him factory Lamborghini support for his sophomore campaign in the North American series.

Returning to ANSA for his first season under Lamborghini's wing, now alongside Tommi Gore, Queen began the season with a Pro class podium in race one at Sebring, which was the highlight of his season as he ended the year 11th in Pro. In parallel, Queen also joined AF Corse-run 23Events Racing to compete in the LMP3 class of the Le Mans Cup alongside Giovanni Maschio. After climbing from tenth to second on debut in Barcelona, Queen won the following race at Le Castellet by jumping from third to first in the closing stages, which turned out to be his only podium of the season as he slipped to fifth in points. Towards the end of the year, Queen partook in the European Le Mans Series rookie tests for AF Corse in LMP2 machinery. Queen then remained with 23Events Racing to compete in the LMP3 Pro class of the 2026–27 Asian Le Mans Cup alongside Maschio.

== Karting record ==
=== Karting career summary ===
Season	Series	Team	Position
2013	SKUSA California ProKart Challenge — TaG Cadet	RPM & RBR Motorsports	19th
2013	SKUSA SuperNationals — TaG Cadet	RBR Motorsports	DNF
2014	SKUSA Pro Tour — TaG Cadet		15th
2014	Los Angeles Kart Club — Junior 1	RPM	
2014	Mini ROK International Final		18th
2015	SKUSA Pro Tour — TaG Cadet		29th
2015	SKUSA SuperNationals — TaG Cadet	Pure Karting	DNF
2018	WSK Super Master Series — OK-J	Ward Racing	93rd
2018	Challenge of the Americas — Junior Rok		17th
2018	Karting Academy Trophy	Robert Queen	23rd
2018	WSK Open Cup — OK-J	Ward Racing	NC

== Racing record ==
=== Racing career summary ===
Season	Series	Team	Races	Wins	Poles	F/Laps	Podiums	Points	Position
2021	BRSCC National Formula Ford Championship – Pro	Low Dempsey Racing	19	0	0	0	0	216	8th
2022	BRSCC National Formula Ford Championship – Pro	Ammonite Motorsport	19	3	0	3	12	408	**2nd**
2022	United Formula Ford Championship – Star Class		?	?	?	?	?	26	**3rd**
2023	GB4 Championship	Fortec Motorsport	20	0	1	2	10	379	4th
2024	GB3 Championship	Fortec Motorsport	23	0	0	0	0	178	14th
2025	Lamborghini Super Trofeo North America – Pro	ANSA Motorsports	12	0	0	0	3	87	5th
2025	Lamborghini Super Trofeo World Finals – Pro	ANSA Motorsports	2	0	0	0	1	10	5th
2025	Nürburgring Langstrecken-Serie – VT2	Walkenhorst Motorsport	1	1	0	0	1	0	NC
2026	Lamborghini Super Trofeo North America – Pro	ANSA Motorsports	10	0	0	0	1	51	11th
2026	Lamborghini Super Trofeo World Finals – Pro	ANSA Motorsports	2	0	0	0	0	12	5th
2026	Le Mans Cup – LMP3	23Events Racing	6	1	0	1	2	45	5th
2026–27	Asian Le Mans Cup – LMP3 Pro	23Events Racing							

* Season still in progress.

=== Complete GB4 Championship results ===
(key) (Races in bold indicate pole position) (Races in italics indicate fastest lap)

Year	Entrant	1	2	3	4	5	6	7	8	9	10	11	12	13	14	15	16	17	18	19	20	21	22	DC	Points
2023	Fortec Motorsport	OUL; 1; 4	OUL; 2 Ret	OUL; 3; 3^{7}	SIL1; 1 C	SIL1; 2; 2	SIL1; 3; 4^{6}	DON1; 1; 3	DON1; 2; 3	**DON1**; **3**; 3	DON1; 4; 13	SNE; 1; 3	SNE; 2; 3	SNE; 3; 5^{4}	SIL2; 1; 3	SIL2; 2; 4	SIL2; 3 C	BRH; 1; 4	BRH; 2; 9	BRH; 3; 12	DON2; 1; 7	DON2; 2; 2	DON2; 3; 2^{7}	4th	317

=== Complete GB3 Championship results ===
(key) (Races in bold indicate pole position) (Races in italics indicate fastest lap)

Year	Team	1	2	3	4	5	6	7	8	9	10	11	12	13	14	15	16	17	18	19	20	21	22	23	24	DC	Points
2024	Fortec Motorsports	OUL; 1; 8	OUL; 2 Ret	OUL; 3; 9	SIL1; 1; 13	SIL1; 2; 16	SIL1; 3 C	SPA; 1; 14	SPA; 2; 11	SPA; 3; 9^{9}	HUN; 1; 14	HUN; 2; 13	HUN; 3; 16^{5}	ZAN; 1; 7	ZAN; 2; 4	ZAN; 3 DSQ	SIL2; 1; 9	SIL2; 2; 23	SIL2; 3; 13^{2}	DON; 1; 19	DON; 2; 8	DON; 3; 8	BRH; 1; 12	BRH; 2; 16	BRH; 3; 14	14th	178

=== Complete Le Mans Cup results ===
(key) (Races in bold indicate pole position) (Races in italics indicate the fastest lap)

Year	Entrant	Car	Class	1	2	3	4	5	6	DC	Points
2026	23Events Racing	Ligier JS P325	LMP3	BAR; 2	LEC; 1	LMS; Ret	SPA; 9	SIL; 13	POR; Ret	5th	45

^{*} Season still in progress.
