= UAE Sportbike Championship =

- Current season, competition or edition: 2013-14 UAE Sportbike Championship season
- Sport: Motorcycle sport
- Founded: 2007
- Country: Dubai Autodrome; UAE
- Most recent champion: (Saudi Arabia) Abdulaziz Binladin

The UAE Sportbike Championship is a motorcycle racing series based in the United Arab Emirates and held throughout the winter. It is run by the Dubai Autodrome Sports Club, held on different configurations of the circuit. Riders compete onboard bikes from various manufacturers including Kawasaki, Triumph and Yamaha.

== Champions ==
=== Stock 600 class ===
| Season | Champion |
|---|---|
| 2010-11 | (Saudi Arabia) Abdulaziz Binladin |
| 2011-12 | (Lebanon) Mahmoud Tannir |
| 2012-13 | (Lebanon) Mahmoud Tannir |
| 2013-14 | (Saudi Arabia) Abdulaziz Binladin |

=== Rookie Cup ===
| Season | Champion |
|---|---|
| 2010-11 | (United Kingdom) Jason Burnside |
| 2011-12 | (India) Surya Raja |
| 2012-13 | (Germany) Dominik Von Poelnitz |
| 2013-14 | (Australia) Michael Collins |
