= Josh Irfan =

British racing driver (born 2008)

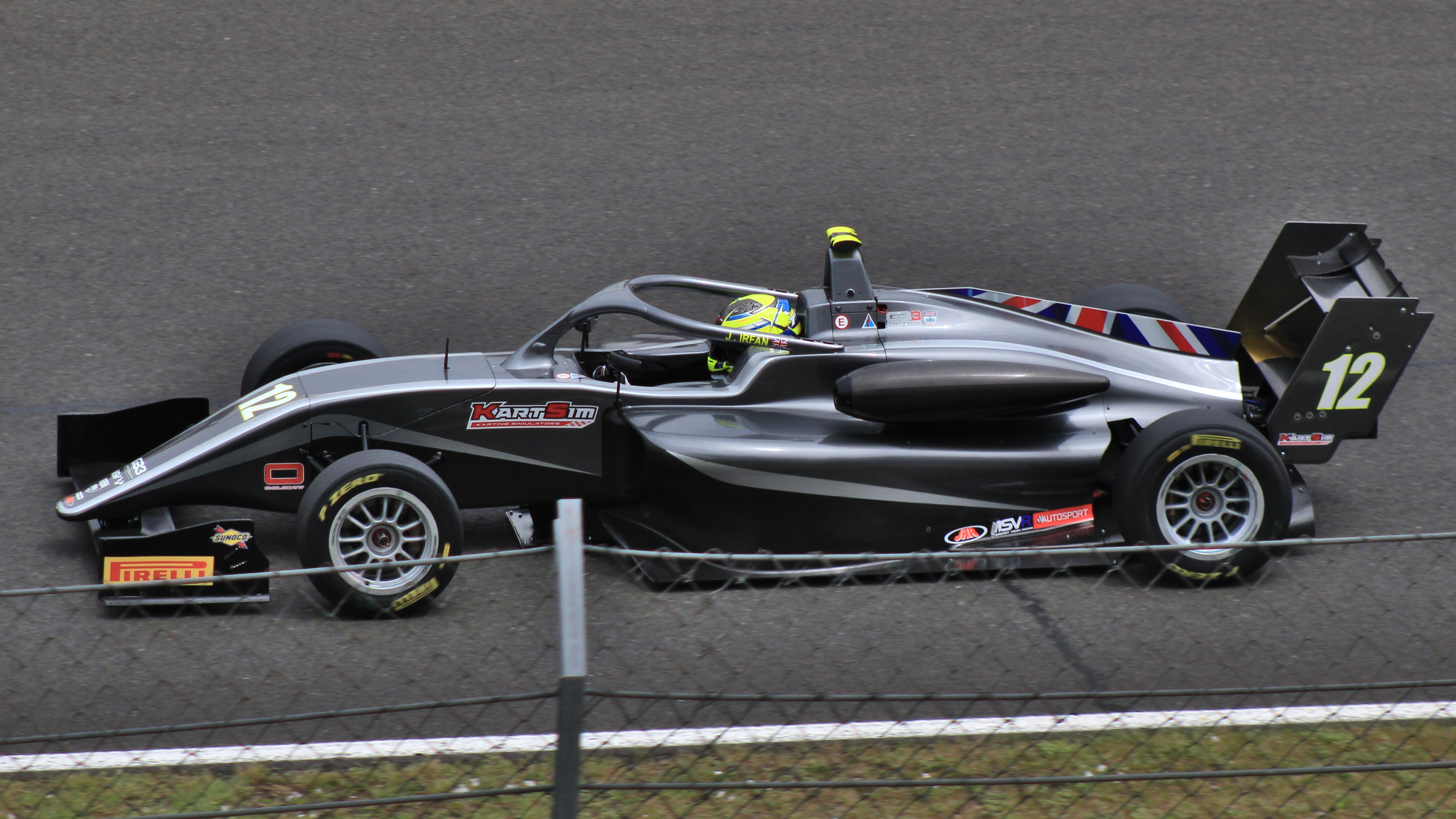
- Irfan at the Hungaroring in 2024
- Nationality: United Kingdom
- Born: Coskun Irfan; 21 February 2008 (age 18) London, United Kingdom

GB3 Championship career
- Debut season: 2024
- Current team: JHR Developments
- Car number: 12
- Starts: 5
- Wins: 0
- Podiums: 0
- Poles: 0
- Fastest laps: 0

Previous series
- 2023: F4 British Championship

Coskun "Josh" Irfan (born 21 February 2008) is a British racing driver from London. He won twice in his debut season of racing in the 2023 F4 British Championship, driving for Rodin Carlin. He last drove for JHR Developments in the 2024 GB3 Championship.

== Career ==
=== Karting ===
Irfan had a successful karting career, and he competed in competitions all over Europe, for example numerous competitions run by the WSK, the European Championship and the Karting World Championship.

=== Formula 4 ===
In January 2023, Irfan announced that he would be driving in British F4 for Rodin Carlin. Irfan made his racing debut at Donington Park in April, finishing 7th in his first race. Irfan would go on to score two victories, the first one at Silverstone and the second one in the reverse-grid race during the season finale at Brands Hatch GP. He finished 12th in the drivers' championship, and third in the rookie standings.

=== GB3 Championship ===
On 8 February 2024, it was confirmed that Irfan would join JHR Developments for the upcoming GB3 Championship. He is the second youngest driver in the championship to compete, only three months older than the American, Nikita Johnson, who has to sit out of the first two rounds because he hasn't passed his 16th birthday. He made his debut at the tricky track that is Oulton Park, and he had a tough weekend, scoring points just once in three races. In spite of this, Irfan turned the situation around and secured his first podium in the Hungaroring round in June.

== Karting record ==
=== Karting career summary ===
Season	Series	Team	Position
2017	WSK Final Cup - 60 Mini	Energy Corse	16th
2018	WSK Champions Cup - 60 Mini	Tony Kart	29th
2018	WSK Super Master Series - 60 Mini	Tony Kart	10th
2018	South Garda Winter Cup - Mini Rok	Parolin Motorsport	13th
2018	Andrea Margutti Trophy - 60 Mini	Parolin Motorsport	1st
2018	WSK Open Cup - 60 Mini	Parolin Motorsport	18th
2018	WSK Final Cup - 60 Mini	Parolin Motorsport	5th
2018	Kartmasters British Grand Prix - IAME Cadet	Fusion Motorsport	1st
2019	WSK Champions Cup - 60 Mini	Parolin Motorsport	34th
2019	WSK Super Master Series - 60 Mini	Parolin Motorsport	7th
2019	South Garda Winter Cup - Mini Rok	Parolin Motorsport	3rd
2019	WSK Euro Series - 60 Mini	Tony Kart	28th
2020	WSK Champions Cup - OKJ	Kosmic Kart	7th
2020	WSK Super Master Series - OKJ	Kosmic Kart	11th
2020	South Garda Winter Cup - OKJ	Kosmic Kart	23rd
2020	WSK Euro Series - OKJ	Kosmic Kart	6th
2020	Champions of the Future - OKJ	Kosmic Kart	16th
2020	CIK-FIA European Championship - OKJ	Kosmic Kart	30th
2020	CIK-FIA World Championship - OKJ	Kosmic Kart	11th
2020	WSK Open Cup - OKJ	Kosmic Kart	20th
2021	WSK Champions Cup - OKJ	Kart Republic	20th
2021	WSK Super Master Series - OKJ	Kart Republic	16th
2021	WSK Euro Series - OKJ	Kart Republic	14th
2021	Champions of the Future - OKJ	Kart Republic	35th
2021	CIK-FIA European Championship - OKJ	Kart Republic	25th
2021	Deutsche Kart Meisterschaft - OKJ	Kart Republic	29th
2021	WSK Open Cup - OKJ	Kart Republic	9th
2021	CIK-FIA World Championship - OKJ	Kart Republic	57th
2021	South Garda Winter Cup - OKJ	Parolin Motorsport	10th
2021	WSK Final Cup - OKJ	Parolin Motorsport	31st
2022	WSK Champions Cup - OK	Parolin Motorsport	3rd
2022	WSK Super Master Series - OK	Parolin Motorsport	34th
2022	Champions of the Future Winter Series - OK	Parolin Motorsport	23rd
2022	Champions of the Future - OK	Parolin Motorsport	40th
2022	CIK-FIA European Championship - OK	Tony Kart	41st
2022	WSK Euro Series - OK	Tony Kart	34th

== Racing record ==
=== Racing career summary ===
Season	Series	Team	Races	Wins	Poles	F/Laps	Podiums	Points	Position
2023	F4 British Championship	Rodin Carlin	30	2	0	0	3	105	12th
2023	GB4 Championship	Elite Motorsport	9	0	0	0	1	117	13th
2023	Formula 4 UAE Championship - Trophy Round	Xcel Motorsport	2	0	0	0	0	N/A	NC
2024	GB3 Championship	JHR Developments	23	0	0	0	1	138	16th

=== Complete F4 British Championship results ===
(key) (Races in bold indicate pole position; races in italics indicate fastest lap)

Year	Team	1	2	3	4	5	6	7	8	9	10	11	12	13	14	15	16	17	18	19	20	21	22	23	24	25	26	27	28	29	30	31	DC	Points
2023	Rodin Carlin	DPN; 1; 7	DPN; 2; 7	DPN; 3; 13	BHI; 1 Ret	BHI; 2; 15^{4}	BHI; 3; 14	SNE; 1 C	SNE; 2 Ret	SNE; 3 Ret	THR; 1; 11	THR; 2; 8^{1}	THR; 3; 13	OUL; 1; 19	OUL; 2; 3^{2}	OUL; 3; 13	SIL; 1; 1	SIL; 2; 13^{2}	SIL; 3; 11	CRO; 1; 4	CRO; 2; 11^{5}	CRO; 3; 5	KNO; 1; 12	KNO; 2; 7^{1}	KNO; 3; 17	DPGP; 1; 15	DPGP; 2; 7	DPGP; 3 Ret	DPGP; 4 Ret	BHGP; 1; 12	BHGP; 2; 1^{1}	BHGP; 3; 16	12th	105

=== Complete GB4 Championship results ===
(key) (Races in bold indicate pole position) (Races in italics indicate fastest lap)

Year	Entrant	1	2	3	4	5	6	7	8	9	10	11	12	13	14	15	16	17	18	19	20	21	22	DC	Points
2023	Elite Motorsport	OUL; 1; 5	OUL; 2; 3	OUL; 3; 4^{4}	SIL1; 1	SIL1; 2	SIL1; 3	DON1; 1	DON1; 2; 6	DON1; 3 Ret	DON1; 4; 10	SNE; 1	SNE; 2	SNE; 3	SIL2; 1	SIL2; 2	SIL2; 3 C	BRH; 1; 5	BRH; 2; 7	BRH; 3 Ret	DON2; 1	DON2; 2	DON2; 3	13th	117

=== Complete GB3 Championship results ===
(key) (Races in bold indicate pole position) (Races in italics indicate fastest lap)

Year	Team	1	2	3	4	5	6	7	8	9	10	11	12	13	14	15	16	17	18	19	20	21	22	23	24	DC	Points
2024	JHR Developments	OUL; 1; 13	OUL; 2 Ret	OUL; 3; 18	SIL1; 1; 12	SIL1; 2; 10	SIL1; 3 C	SPA; 1; 11	SPA; 2; 18	SPA; 3 Ret	HUN; 1; 11	HUN; 2; 11	HUN; 3; 2	ZAN; 1; 15	ZAN; 2; 9	ZAN; 3; 8	SIL2; 1; 15	SIL2; 2; 21	SIL2; 3; 19	DON; 1; 15	DON; 2; 16	DON; 3; 21	BRH; 1; 13	BRH; 2; 14	BRH; 3; 16^{2}	16th	138

^{*} Season still in progress.
