= 2024 GB3 Championship =

Motor racing championship

The 2024 GB3 Championship was a motor racing championship for open wheel, formula racing cars held across Europe. The 2024 season was the ninth organised by the British Racing Drivers' Club in the United Kingdom, and the fourth season under the GB3 moniker after rebranding from the BRDC British Formula 3 Championship in mid-2021. The championship featured a mix of professional motor racing teams and privately funded drivers. The season was run over eight triple-header rounds, starting in March and running over eight race weekends until September.

Both championships were decided at the final race: Louis Sharp won the Drivers' Championship ahead of John Bennett and Tymek Kucharczyk, while his team, Rodin Motorsport, won its first Teams' Championship

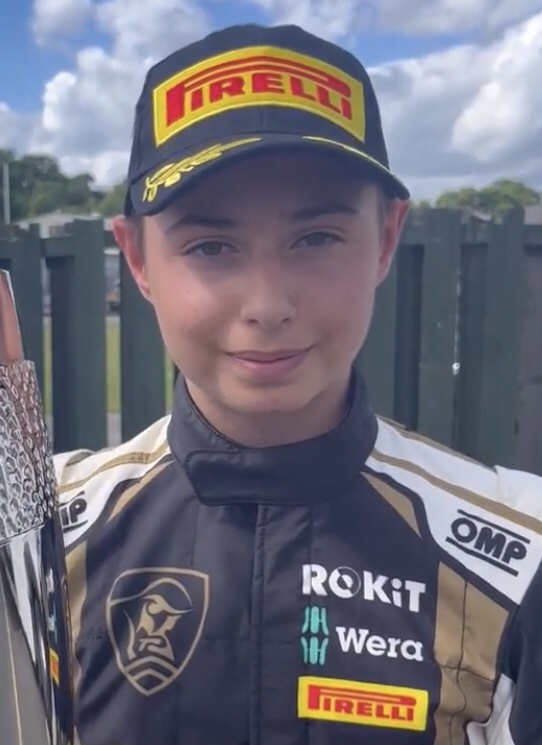
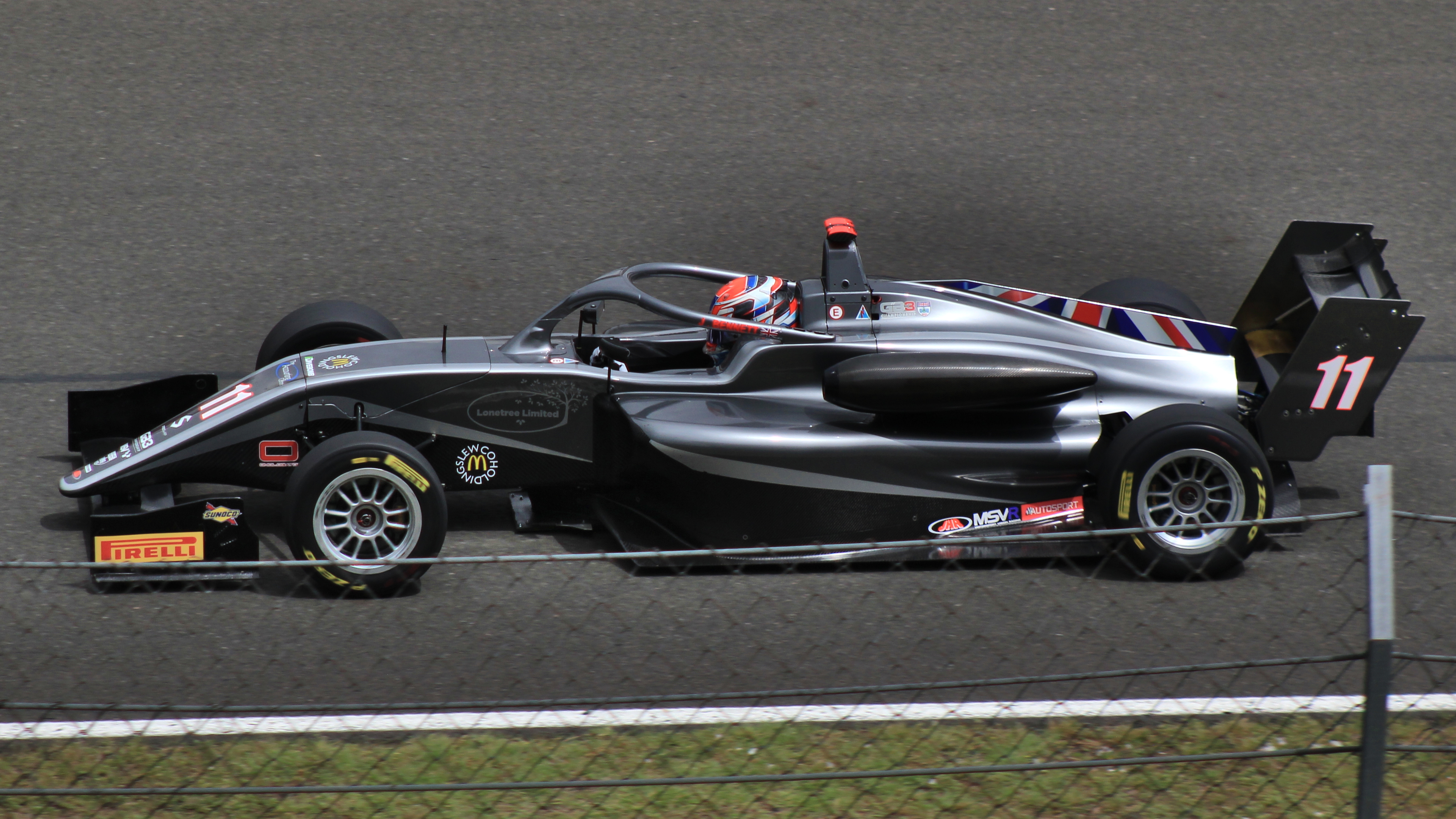
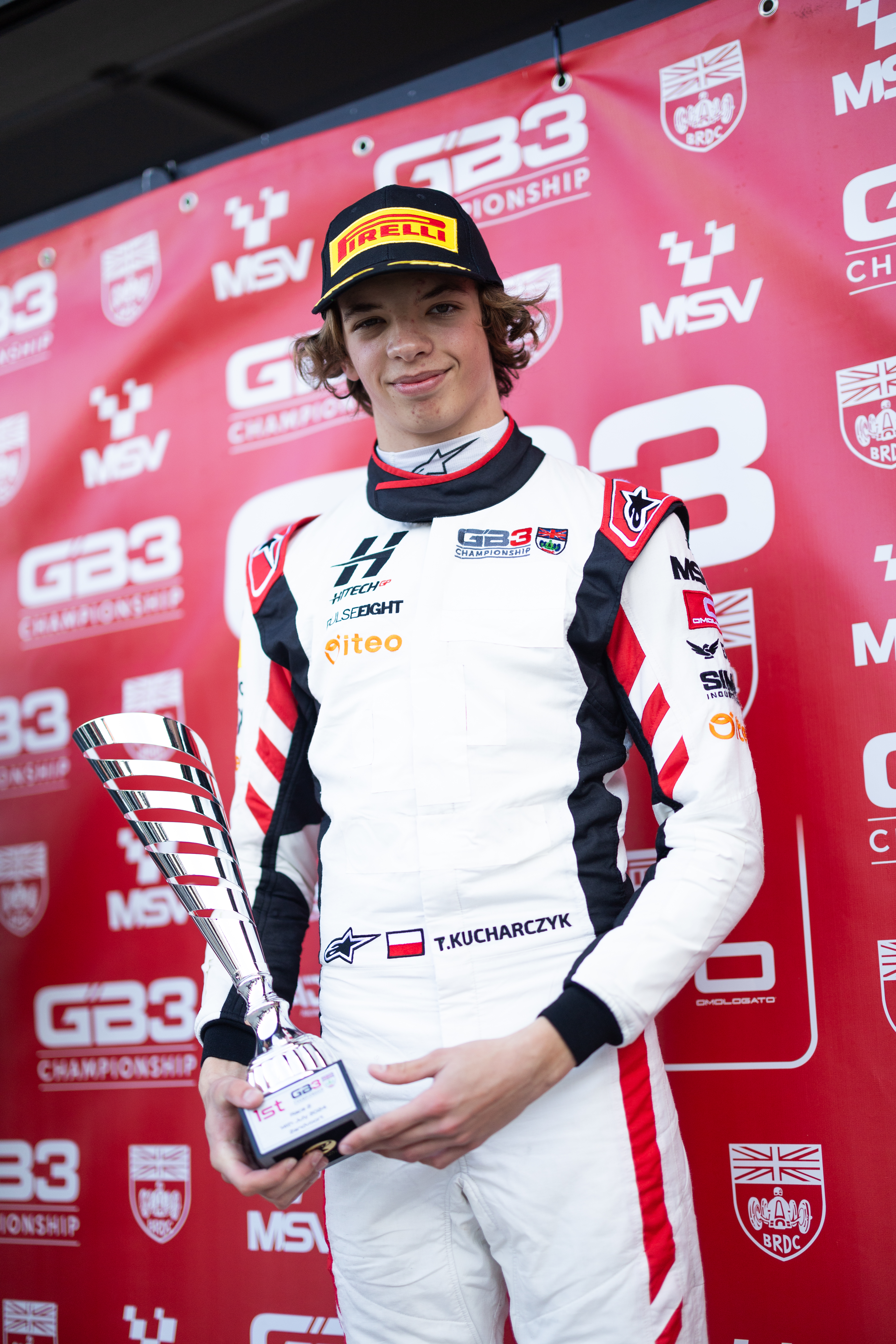
Rodin Motorsport driver Louis Sharp (top) won the Drivers' Championship. John Bennett (middle), driving for JHR Developments, finished the season as runner-up. Tymek Kucharczyk (bottom), driving for Hitech Pulse-Eight finished third in the championship.

== Teams and drivers ==
Team	No.	Driver	Rounds
(United Kingdom) VRD Racing by Arden	2	(United Kingdom) James Hedley	1–2
(United Kingdom) VRD Racing by Arden	3	(United States) Noah Ping	All
(United Kingdom) VRD Racing by Arden	17	(United States) Nikita Johnson	3–8
(United Kingdom) VRD Racing by Arden	32	(United States) Shawn Rashid	All
(New Zealand) Rodin Motorsport	2	(United Kingdom) James Hedley	4–5
(New Zealand) Rodin Motorsport	7	(New Zealand) Louis Sharp	All
(New Zealand) Rodin Motorsport	18	(France) Arthur Rogeon	All
(New Zealand) Rodin Motorsport	27	(United Kingdom) Freddie Slater	7
(New Zealand) Rodin Motorsport	31	(United States) Ugo Ugochukwu	1–3, 6
(New Zealand) Rodin Motorsport	35	(United Kingdom) Callum Voisin	8
(United Kingdom) Chris Dittmann Racing	2	(United Kingdom) James Hedley	8
(United Kingdom) Chris Dittmann Racing	9	(New Zealand) Jacob Douglas	6–7
(United Kingdom) Chris Dittmann Racing	19	(Japan) Kanato Le	3
(United Kingdom) Chris Dittmann Racing	34	(Norway) Martinius Stenshorne	2
(United Kingdom) Chris Dittmann Racing	43	(United Kingdom) Tom Mills	8
(United Kingdom) Chris Dittmann Racing	55	(Philippines) Flynn Jackes	1–7
(United Kingdom) Chris Dittmann Racing	77	(Singapore) Rishab Jain	1
(United Kingdom) Chris Dittmann Racing	77	(Spain) Javier Sagrera	4
(United Kingdom) Chris Dittmann Racing	91	(United Kingdom) Sebastian Murray	All
(United Kingdom) Hillspeed	6	(United Kingdom) Marcus Luzio	3, 6
(United Kingdom) Hillspeed	15	(India) Aditya Kulkarni	All
(United Kingdom) JHR Developments	10	(Australia) Patrick Heuzenroeder	All
(United Kingdom) JHR Developments	11	(United Kingdom) John Bennett	All
(United Kingdom) JHR Developments	12	(United Kingdom) Josh Irfan	All
(United Kingdom) Elite Motorsport	16	(United Kingdom) McKenzy Cresswell	All
(United Kingdom) Elite Motorsport	20	(South Africa) Jarrod Waberski	All
(United Kingdom) Elite Motorsport	33	(Germany) Hugo Schwarze	All
(United Kingdom) Hitech Pulse-Eight	21	(United Kingdom) William Macintyre	All
(United Kingdom) Hitech Pulse-Eight	22	(Poland) Tymek Kucharczyk	All
(United Kingdom) Hitech Pulse-Eight	23	(China) Gerrard Xie	All
(United Kingdom) Fortec Motorsports	41	(United Kingdom) Edward Pearson	1–7
(United Kingdom) Fortec Motorsports	42	(Australia) James Wharton	2, 6
(United Kingdom) Fortec Motorsports	51	(Singapore) Alex Kattoulas (Note: Kattoulas is a Japanese-Greek driver competing under a Singaporean licence.)	7
(United Kingdom) Fortec Motorsports	62	(United States) Colin Queen	All
(United Kingdom) Arden Motorsport	88	(United States) Max Taylor	7

- Isaac Barashi was announced to be making his series debut for Chris Dittmann Racing at the Hungaroring, but instead elected to replace Nikita Bedrin at MP Motorsport in FRECA.
- Ammonite Motorsport announced their entry into the championship ahead of the season, but did not field any drivers at any of the eight rounds.
- Douglas Motorsport, a series mainstay since 2019, also did not field any drivers.

== Race calendar ==
The provisional calendar was announced on 22 November 2023. After the series was awarded FIA international status in 2022, another international event was added in 2023, with the championship's debut at the Hungaroring replacing the round at Snetterton.

Round		Circuit	Date	Supporting	Map of circuit locations
1	R1	(United Kingdom) Oulton Park (International Circuit, Cheshire)	30 March	British GT Championship	2024 GB3 Championship is located in Northern and Central Europe
1	R2	(United Kingdom) Oulton Park (International Circuit, Cheshire)	1 April	British GT Championship	2024 GB3 Championship is located in Northern and Central Europe
1	R3	(United Kingdom) Oulton Park (International Circuit, Cheshire)	1 April	British GT Championship	2024 GB3 Championship is located in Northern and Central Europe
2	R4	(United Kingdom) Silverstone Circuit (Grand Prix Circuit, Northamptonshire)	27 April	British GT Championship	2024 GB3 Championship is located in Northern and Central Europe
2	R5	(United Kingdom) Silverstone Circuit (Grand Prix Circuit, Northamptonshire)	28 April	British GT Championship	2024 GB3 Championship is located in Northern and Central Europe
2	R6	(United Kingdom) Silverstone Circuit (Grand Prix Circuit, Northamptonshire)	28 April	British GT Championship	2024 GB3 Championship is located in Northern and Central Europe
3	R7	Circuit de Spa-Francorchamps (Spa, Belgium)	1 June	Spa Euro Race	2024 GB3 Championship is located in Northern and Central Europe
3	R8	Circuit de Spa-Francorchamps (Spa, Belgium)	1 June	Spa Euro Race	2024 GB3 Championship is located in Northern and Central Europe
3	R9	Circuit de Spa-Francorchamps (Spa, Belgium)	2 June	Spa Euro Race	2024 GB3 Championship is located in Northern and Central Europe
4	R10	Hungaroring (Mogyoród, Hungary)	22 June	International GT Open	2024 GB3 Championship is located in Northern and Central Europe
4	R11	Hungaroring (Mogyoród, Hungary)	23 June	International GT Open	2024 GB3 Championship is located in Northern and Central Europe
4	R12	Hungaroring (Mogyoród, Hungary)	23 June	International GT Open	2024 GB3 Championship is located in Northern and Central Europe
5	R13	Circuit Zandvoort (Zandvoort, Netherlands)	13 July	Zandvoort Summer Trophy	2024 GB3 Championship is located in Northern and Central Europe
5	R14	Circuit Zandvoort (Zandvoort, Netherlands)	14 July	Zandvoort Summer Trophy	2024 GB3 Championship is located in Northern and Central Europe
5	R15	Circuit Zandvoort (Zandvoort, Netherlands)	14 July	Zandvoort Summer Trophy	2024 GB3 Championship is located in Northern and Central Europe
6	R16	(United Kingdom) Silverstone Circuit (Grand Prix Circuit, Northamptonshire)	27 July	MSVR race weekend	2024 GB3 Championship is located in Northern and Central Europe
6	R17	(United Kingdom) Silverstone Circuit (Grand Prix Circuit, Northamptonshire)	28 July	MSVR race weekend	2024 GB3 Championship is located in Northern and Central Europe
6	R18	(United Kingdom) Silverstone Circuit (Grand Prix Circuit, Northamptonshire)	28 July	MSVR race weekend	2024 GB3 Championship is located in Northern and Central Europe
7	R19	(United Kingdom) Donington Park (Grand Prix Circuit, Leicestershire)	7 September	British GT Championship	2024 GB3 Championship is located in Northern and Central Europe
7	R20	(United Kingdom) Donington Park (Grand Prix Circuit, Leicestershire)	8 September	British GT Championship	2024 GB3 Championship is located in Northern and Central Europe
7	R21	(United Kingdom) Donington Park (Grand Prix Circuit, Leicestershire)	8 September	British GT Championship	2024 GB3 Championship is located in Northern and Central Europe
8	R22	(United Kingdom) Brands Hatch (Grand Prix Circuit, Kent)	28 September	British GT Championship	2024 GB3 Championship is located in Northern and Central Europe
8	R23	(United Kingdom) Brands Hatch (Grand Prix Circuit, Kent)	29 September	British GT Championship	2024 GB3 Championship is located in Northern and Central Europe
8	R24	(United Kingdom) Brands Hatch (Grand Prix Circuit, Kent)	29 September	British GT Championship	2024 GB3 Championship is located in Northern and Central Europe

== Race results ==
Round		Circuit	Pole position	Fastest lap	Winning driver	Winning team
1	R1	(United Kingdom) Oulton Park	(New Zealand) Louis Sharp	(United Kingdom) John Bennett	(New Zealand) Louis Sharp	Rodin Motorsport
1	R2	(United Kingdom) Oulton Park	(New Zealand) Louis Sharp	(United Kingdom) John Bennett	(United Kingdom) John Bennett	JHR Developments
1	R3	(United Kingdom) Oulton Park		(United Kingdom) William Macintyre	(United Kingdom) William Macintyre	Hitech Pulse-Eight
2	R4	(United Kingdom) Silverstone Circuit	(Poland) Tymek Kucharczyk	(Poland) Tymek Kucharczyk	(Poland) Tymek Kucharczyk	Hitech Pulse-Eight
2	R5	(United Kingdom) Silverstone Circuit	(Poland) Tymek Kucharczyk	(Poland) Tymek Kucharczyk	(United Kingdom) William Macintyre	Hitech Pulse-Eight
2	R6	(United Kingdom) Silverstone Circuit		race cancelled due to adverse weather conditions		
3	R7	(Belgium) Circuit de Spa-Francorchamps	(Poland) Tymek Kucharczyk	(United Kingdom) William Macintyre	(Poland) Tymek Kucharczyk	Hitech Pulse-Eight
3	R8	(Belgium) Circuit de Spa-Francorchamps	(United Kingdom) John Bennett	(United States) Noah Ping	(Poland) Tymek Kucharczyk	Hitech Pulse-Eight
3	R9	(Belgium) Circuit de Spa-Francorchamps		(United Kingdom) William Macintyre	(United Kingdom) William Macintyre	Hitech Pulse-Eight
4	R10	(Hungary) Hungaroring	(China) Gerrard Xie	(Poland) Tymek Kucharczyk	(China) Gerrard Xie	Hitech Pulse-Eight
4	R11	(Hungary) Hungaroring	(China) Gerrard Xie	(New Zealand) Louis Sharp	(New Zealand) Louis Sharp	Rodin Motorsport
4	R12	(Hungary) Hungaroring		(Poland) Tymek Kucharczyk	(France) Arthur Rogeon	Rodin Motorsport
5	R13	(Netherlands) Circuit Zandvoort	(United Kingdom) John Bennett	(United Kingdom) John Bennett	(United Kingdom) John Bennett	JHR Developments
5	R14	(Netherlands) Circuit Zandvoort	(United Kingdom) John Bennett	(Poland) Tymek Kucharczyk	(Poland) Tymek Kucharczyk	Hitech Pulse-Eight
5	R15	(Netherlands) Circuit Zandvoort		(United States) Nikita Johnson	(United States) Nikita Johnson	VRD by Arden
6	R16	(United Kingdom) Silverstone Circuit	(United Kingdom) McKenzy Cresswell	(United Kingdom) John Bennett	(United Kingdom) John Bennett	JHR Developments
6	R17	(United Kingdom) Silverstone Circuit	(United Kingdom) McKenzy Cresswell	(United Kingdom) McKenzy Cresswell	(United Kingdom) McKenzy Cresswell	Elite Motorsport
6	R18	(United Kingdom) Silverstone Circuit		(Poland) Tymek Kucharczyk	(France) Arthur Rogeon	Rodin Motorsport
7	R19	(United Kingdom) Donington Park	(New Zealand) Louis Sharp	(Poland) Tymek Kucharczyk	(New Zealand) Louis Sharp	Rodin Motorsport
7	R20	(United Kingdom) Donington Park	(New Zealand) Louis Sharp	(Poland) Tymek Kucharczyk	(New Zealand) Louis Sharp	Rodin Motorsport
7	R21	(United Kingdom) Donington Park		(France) Arthur Rogeon	(France) Arthur Rogeon	Rodin Motorsport
8	R22	(United Kingdom) Brands Hatch	(United Kingdom) McKenzy Cresswell	(United Kingdom) John Bennett	(United Kingdom) McKenzy Cresswell	Elite Motorsport
8	R23	(United Kingdom) Brands Hatch	(New Zealand) Louis Sharp	(Poland) Tymek Kucharczyk	(New Zealand) Louis Sharp	Rodin Motorsport
8	R24	(United Kingdom) Brands Hatch		(United Kingdom) Callum Voisin	(United States) Nikita Johnson	VRD by Arden

== Season report ==
=== First half ===
The 2024 GB3 Championship began across Easter weekend at Oulton Park with Rodin’s Louis Sharp taking a pair of pole positions. The first race of the season was decided at the start, with Sharp defending his lead from JHR’s John Bennett. The pair ran line astern from this point on, while Sharp’s teammate Ugo Ugochukwu completed the podium. Race two started behind the safety car as it was very wet. Sharp led the opening part of the race, until a restart after a three-car collision when Bennett took the lead. Sharp dropped back and had to defend from Hitech’s Tymek Kucharczyk, before the latter ran off track. This saw Elite’s McKenzy Cresswell claim third. The reverse-grid final race looked set to be won by Rodin’s Arthur Rogeon, who had moved from fourth to the lead at the start, but the Frenchman’s car suffered a gearbox issue on the final lap. This handed Hitech’s William Macintyre the win ahead of Elite’s Jarrod Waberski and Ugochukwu. Sharp came fifth to leave Cheshire leading the standings, 15 points ahead of Ugochukwu.

Round two saw Kucharczyk take both pole positions around Silverstone. He kept his lead at the start of the first race, while Cresswell was able to take second from Macintyre into Copse. Kucharczyk managed his lead from then on and built a 7.8-second gap to Cresswell to take an unchallenged victory. Cresswell came second as Macintyre had to defend from Sharp. The Australian tried a move on lap three, but that dropped him into the clutches of Ugochukwu behind him. The pair ran side by side before Sharp came out on top again, after which the order stabilised. The rest of the weekend was disrupted by heavy rain, which saw race two postponed to Sunday afternoon and race three cancelled. Macintyre started race two second on the drier side of a damp track, which helped him take the lead. Ugochukwu moved from fifth to second, while poleman Kucharczyk dropped to third. Ugochukwu kept close to Macintyre, but was unable to challenge him. Sharp came fifth and now led Ugochukwu by 9 points.

GB3’s continental leg began at Spa with Kucharczyk and Bennett sharing pole positions. The pair started the first race alongside each other, with the Pole coming out ahead at Les Combes. He built a gap to the field and managed the race from that point on. Championship leaders Sharp and Ugochukwu started third and fourth and also battled at the start, with Sharp coming out on top to complete the podium. Race two began similarly, with polesitter Bennett keeping the lead through the first laps, but Kucharczyk managed to stay with him and take first place on lap three. Bennett had no opportunity to fight back as the race finished under yellow, while Sharp took another third place. Race three began with the top three side by side on the Kemmel Straight, before two of them collided and Hitech’s Gerrard Xie took the lead. After the ensuing safety car, Macintyre moved past Xie to take first place. Sharp retired after colliding with VRD Arden’s Noah Ping as they fought for third, allowing Kucharczyk to take the championship lead by nine points.

Round four saw GB3 make its debut at the Hungaroring, where Xie took both pole positions. The series’ first race in Hungary saw the pole sitter defend from Kucharczyk at the start, before the latter then had to fend off Bennett a corner later. A largely uneventful race saw Xie soak up the pressure from behind to take the win. The second race saw Xie make the same defensive move on Kucharczyk, but the man on the move was Sharp, who started fifth and had made his way into second by turn four. Xie then suffered a car issue, handing Sharp the race lead which he controlled from then on. Kucharczyk came home second ahead of Macintyre before being disqualified post-race, which promoted Cresswell onto the podium. Rogeon started the third race from the reverse-grid front row and quickly took the lead from JHR’s Josh Irfan, while Waberski fended off Sharp to maintain third. Kucharczyk failed to score again after sustaining a broken front wing and dropped to third in the standings, with Sharp now leading Macintyre by two points.

=== Second half ===
The second half of the season started at Zandvoort with Bennett claiming a double pole position. After he held Kucharczyk off at the start of the first race, rain began to fall. Leader Bennett handled the slippery conditions best, building up a lead and taking the win of the race. Rodin’s James Hedley completed the podium. Race two began with a multi-car collision at the start that caused a red flag. Bennett lost the lead to Kucharczyk and Sharp on the restart, but kept close to the Kiwi. When he tried to retake second place, the pair collided, with Sharp retiring and Bennett pitting with damage. Kucharczyk took the win, with Hedley and Cresswell promoted onto the podium. Race three saw VRD Arden’s Nikita Johnson initially lose the lead to JHR’s Patrick Heuzenroeder before he took it back two corners later. Cresswell also slipped through, demoting the Australian to third place. Johnson held on to win his first GB3 race, while Kucharczyk in tenth left the Netherlands as the new championship leader, 18 points ahead of Sharp.

Cresswell took two pole positions on GB3’s return to Silverstone. Sharp had the better start to the first race and moved into the lead, before Bennett got past both of them into Stowe. Cresswell then collided with championship leader Kucharczyk, forcing the Pole to retire. This saw Waberski get promoted onto the podium, with the top three then staying in their spots for the rest of the race. Race two began in very similar fashion, with Sharp and then also Bennett drawing level with pole sitter Cresswell, but this time, he managed to hold on to the lead. From that point, Cresswell built a gap to the field and led Sharp and Bennett home for his first GB3 win in a year. The reverse-grid third race saw pole sitter Heuzenroeder lose his lead to Rogeon, with the Frenchman then going on to win the race. VRD Arden’s Shawn Rashid also got past Heuzenroeder to claim second, before the Australian lost even more places. Kucharczyk completed the podium, but his bad weekend still saw him fall behind Sharp and Bennett in the standings.

The penultimate round at Donington Park saw leader Sharp take both pole positions. He was not challenged by Kucharczyk and Xie behind him at the start of the first race, but was unable to then build a gap. Kucharczyk chased him all race before running off track on the final lap while pushing. He rejoined fourth, with Xie getting into second and Bennett promoted onto the podium. Race two saw Sharp again control proceedings from pole position, with Kucharczyk again able to stay with but not pass him. Ping took third, benefitting from post-race penalties for both Xie and Rodin’s debutant Freddie Slater. Rogeon took his third reverse-grid victory in race three as he led Cresswell for the whole race. Macintyre was third after passing Fortec’s Colin Queen, while championship contenders Bennett, Sharp and Kucharczyk came fourth, sixth and seventh, respectively. Ahead of the final weekend, Sharp now had a 33-point lead over Bennett, with Kucharczyk a further three points behind and a maximum of 102 points still on offer.

Cresswell and Sharp took the pole positions for the final weekend at Brands Hatch. Cresswell had to fend off Bennett at the start of race one as Kucharczyk and Sharp came together while battling over third. The championship leader dropped to eighth and could only manage to finish seventh, while Cresswell took the win and Bennett and Kucharczyk finished on the podium to close up to Sharp in the standings. The New Zealander bounced back with a lights-to-flag victory in race two, with Bennett second and Kucharczyk third, now mathematically eliminated from championship contention. Johnson started the final race of the year from pole and resisted pressure from 2023 champion Callum Voisin, who made a one-off appearance with Rodin, to take the win. Sharp only needed to finish eleventh to clinch the title. He did one better and ended the race in tenth, not attacking Bennett in ninth to take the championship title. With the help of Voisin's podium, Sharp's team Rodin was also able to take their inaugural teams’ title.

Louis Sharp was the latest in a row of champions confirmed on the final race day of the season as GB3 offered fans another close championship fight. He, Bennett and Kucharczyk all had races where they were clearly the fastest, but Sharp’s low points were not as frequent and also not as pronounced, helping him distance himself from his rivals. Off track, the GB3 Championship continued its evolution away from a mainly British championship to a real alternative to the Formula Regional European Championship and the Eurocup-3. In August of 2024, the organisers revealed the new car to be used in 2025 and beyond, signalling a clear intent to position GB3 as a direct feeder to FIA Formula 3, and continued growth in interest by both drivers and teams supported this claim.

== Championship standings ==
Scoring system

Points were awarded to the top 20 classified finishers in races one and two, with the third race awarding points to only the top 15. Race three, which had its grid formed by reversing the top twelve from the qualifying order, awarded extra points, up until a maximum of twelve, for positions gained from the drivers' respective starting positions.

Races	Position, points per race																			
Races	1st	2nd	3rd	4th	5th	6th	7th	8th	9th	10th	11th	12th	13th	14th	15th	16th	17th	18th	19th	20th
Races 1 & 2	35	29	24	21	19	17	15	13	12	11	10	9	8	7	6	5	4	3	2	1
Race 3	20	17	15	13	11	10	9	8	7	6	5	4	3	2	1					

=== Drivers' championship ===
Pos	Driver	OUL (United Kingdom)			SIL1 (United Kingdom)			SPA (Belgium)			HUN (Hungary)			ZAN (Netherlands)			SIL2 (United Kingdom)			DON (United Kingdom)			BRH (United Kingdom)			Pts
Pos	Driver	R1	R2	R3	R4	R5	R6	R7	R8	R9	R10	R11	R12	R13	R14	R15	R16	R17	R18	R19	R20	R21	R22	R23	R24	Pts
1	(New Zealand) Louis Sharp	**1**	**2**	5^{7}	4	5	C	3	3	Ret	7	1	4	4	Ret	7^{2}	2	2	7^{4}	**1**	**1**	6^{6}	7	**1**	10	478
2	(United Kingdom) John Bennett	2	1	14	10	8	C	2	**2**	Ret	3	6	7^{3}	**1**	**15**	10^{7}	1	3	4^{5}	3	7	4^{5}	2	2	9^{2}	456
3	(Poland) Tymek Kucharczyk	6	Ret	4^{3}	**1**	**3**	C	**1**	1	4^{8}	2	DSQ	17	2	1	9^{2}	Ret	5	3^{4}	4	2	7^{4}	3	3	8^{1}	443
4	(United Kingdom) McKenzy Cresswell	5	3	8	2	4	C	7	Ret	6^{1}	6	3	9	Ret	3	2^{3}	**7**	**1**	11^{1}	10	10	2	**1**	4	11^{1}	376
5	(United Kingdom) William Macintyre	9	6	1^{4}	3	1	C	5	5	1^{4}	5	2	8^{1}	5	Ret	5^{2}	13	16	10^{8}	7	9	3^{2}	5	15	5^{2}	372
6	(South Africa) Jarrod Waberski	10	7	2^{1}	7	6	C	10	12	13	10	5	3	10	12	13^{3}	3	4	12	9	13	12^{1}	11	5	4	286
7	(China) Gerrard Xie	4	5	10	5	9	C	Ret	15	2	**1**	**19**	Ret	11	Ret	12	4	9	6^{4}	2	6	9^{1}	Ret	Ret	7	261
8	(France) Arthur Rogeon	7	10	6	16	18	C	15	9	8^{5}	9	Ret	1^{1}	13	13	16	12	11	1^{1}	12	5	1	8	6	3^{1}	258
9	(Germany) Hugo Schwarze	18	8	13^{3}	15	12	C	8	13	7	12	9	10^{5}	6	Ret	4^{2}	6	10	5	8	18	17	4	8	Ret	219
10	(United States) Noah Ping	14	15	11^{4}	22	13	C	6	Ret	3^{3}	13	7	18	16	Ret	6^{6}	5	8	22	5	3	15	10	7	Ret	211
11	(United States) Nikita Johnson							9	Ret	Ret	16	12	11^{8}	9	6	1^{1}	10	14	9^{4}	14	12	11^{5}	6	9	1	193
12	(Australia) Patrick Heuzenroeder	11	9	Ret	11	15	C	13	Ret	14^{6}	8	4	5^{1}	19	5	3	16	12	8	18	15	18	17	11	6	189
13	(United States) Ugo Ugochukwu	3	4	3^{7}	6	2	C	4	4	Ret							8	6	21							185
14	(United States) Colin Queen	8	Ret	9	13	16	C	14	11	9^{9}	14	13	16^{5}	7	4	DSQ	9	23	13^{2}	19	8	8	12	16	14	178
15	(United Kingdom) James Hedley	17	Ret	15^{6}	8	7	C				4	8	6^{2}	3	2	11							18	Ret	12^{1}	151
16	(United Kingdom) Josh Irfan	13	Ret	18	12	10	C	11	18	Ret	11	11	2	15	9	8	15	21	19	15	16	21	13	14	16^{2}	138
17	(United States) Shawn Rashid	19	12	Ret	14	20	C	20	7	Ret	15	10	12	8	14	17	Ret	7	2^{1}	21	21	13^{4}	Ret	12	18	125
18	(United Kingdom) Sebastian Murray	15	13	7	19	Ret	C	16	8	DSQ	17	15	Ret	Ret	7	Ret	14	13	14	13	20	16^{3}	15	18	13^{2}	111
19	(India) Aditya Kulkarni	Ret	11	Ret	18	21	C	21	16	12^{10}	19	18	14^{4}	14	10	14^{6}	19	18	Ret	16	14	10^{4}	16	17	15^{5}	111
20	(United Kingdom) Edward Pearson	12	Ret	12^{2}	17	17	C	18	10	11^{8}	20	16	13^{7}	17	8	DSQ	21	17	18	WD	WD	WD				87
21	(Philippines) Flynn Jackes	16	14	16^{1}	21	19	C	17	14	10^{6}	21	17	15	12	11	15^{3}	18	22	17^{6}	WD	WD	WD				75
22	(United Kingdom) Freddie Slater																			6	4	5^{2}				51
23	(Japan) Kanato Le							12	6	5^{9}																46
24	(United Kingdom) Callum Voisin																						9	10	2	40
25	(Australia) James Wharton				20	11	C										11	15	15^{2}							30
26	(United States) Max Taylor																			11	11	14				22
27	(Norway) Martinius Stenshorne				9	14	C																			19
28	(New Zealand) Jacob Douglas																17	19	16^{5}	17	19	19^{1}				18
29	(United Kingdom) Tom Mills																						14	13	17^{2}	17
30	(United Kingdom) Marcus Luzio							19	17	15^{6}							20	20	20^{2}							17
31	(Spain) Javier Sagrera										18	14	19													10
32	(Singapore) Alex Kattoulas																			20	17	20^{1}				6
33	(Singapore) Rishab Jain	20	Ret	17^{3}																						4
Pos	Driver	R1	R2	R3	R4	R5	R6	R7	R8	R9	R10	R11	R12	R13	R14	R15	R16	R17	R18	R19	R20	R21	R22	R23	R24	Pts
Pos	Driver	OUL (United Kingdom)			SIL1 (United Kingdom)			SPA (Belgium)			HUN (Hungary)			ZAN (Netherlands)			SIL2 (United Kingdom)			DON (United Kingdom)			BRH (United Kingdom)			Pts

Colour	Result
Gold	Winner
Silver	Second place
Bronze	Third place
Green	Points classification
Blue	Non-points classification
Blue	Non-classified finish (NC)
Purple	Retired, not classified (Ret)
Red	Did not qualify (DNQ)
Red	Did not pre-qualify (DNPQ)
Black	Disqualified (DSQ)
White	Did not start (DNS)
White	Withdrew (WD)
White	Race cancelled (C)
Blank	Did not practice (DNP)
Blank	Did not arrive (DNA)
Blank	Excluded (EX)

**Bold** – Pole

Italics – Fastest Lap

^{1} ^{2 ... 12} – positions gained and thus extra points earned during race three.

=== Teams' championship ===
Each team counted its two best results of every race.

Pos	Team	OUL (United Kingdom)			SIL1 (United Kingdom)			SPA (Belgium)			HUN (Hungary)			ZAN (Netherlands)			SIL2 (United Kingdom)			DON (United Kingdom)			BRH (United Kingdom)			Pts
Pos	Team	R1	R2	R3	R4	R5	R6	R7	R8	R9	R10	R11	R12	R13	R14	R15	R16	R17	R18	R19	R20	R21	R22	R23	R24	Pts
1	Rodin Motorsport	1	2	3^{8}	4	2	C	3	3	8^{5}	4	1	1^{1}	3	2	7^{2}	2	2	1^{1}	1	1	1	7	1	2	933
1	Rodin Motorsport	3	4	5^{8}	6	5	C	4	4	Ret	7	8	4	4	13	11	8	6	7^{4}	6	4	6^{6}	8	6	3^{1}	933
2	Hitech Pulse-Eight	4	5	1^{4}	1	1	C	1	1	1^{4}	1	2	8^{1}	2	1	5^{2}	4	5	3^{4}	2	2	3^{2}	3	3	5^{2}	908
2	Hitech Pulse-Eight	6	6	4^{3}	3	3	C	5	5	4^{8}	2	19	17	5	Ret	9^{2}	13	9	6^{4}	4	6	7^{4}	5	15	7	908
3	Elite Motorsport	5	3	2^{1}	2	4	C	7	12	6^{1}	6	3	3	6	3	2^{3}	3	1	5	8	10	2	1	4	4	729
3	Elite Motorsport	10	7	8	7	6	C	8	13	7	10	5	10^{5}	10	12	4^{2}	6	4	11^{1}	9	13	12^{1}	4	5	11^{1}	729
4	JHR Developments	2	1	14	10	8	C	2	2	14^{6}	3	4	2	1	5	3	1	3	4^{5}	3	7	4^{5}	2	2	6	680
4	JHR Developments	11	9	18	11	10	C	11	18	Ret	8	6	5^{1}	15	9	10^{7}	15	12	8	15	15	18	13	11	9^{2}	680
5	VRD by Arden	14	12	11^{4}	8	7	C	6	7	3^{3}	13	7	11^{8}	8	6	1^{1}	5	7	2^{1}	5	3	11^{5}	6	7	1	528
5	VRD by Arden	17	16	15^{6}	14	13	C	9	Ret	Ret	15	10	12	9	14	6^{6}	10	8	9^{4}	14	12	13^{4}	10	9	18	528
6	Fortec Motorsports	8	Ret	9	13	11	C	14	10	9^{9}	14	13	13^{7}	7	4	DSQ	9	15	13^{2}	19	8	8	12	16	14	296
6	Fortec Motorsports	12	Ret	12^{2}	17	16	C	18	11	11^{8}	20	16	16^{5}	17	8	DSQ	11	17	15^{2}	20	17	20^{1}				296
7	Chris Dittmann Racing	15	13	7	9	14	C	12	6	5^{9}	17	14	15	12	7	15^{3}	14	13	16^{5}	13	19	16^{3}	14	13	12^{1}	281
7	Chris Dittmann Racing	16	14	17^{3}	19	19	C	16	8	10^{6}	18	15	19	Ret	11	Ret	17	19	17^{6}	17	20	19^{1}	15	18	13^{2}	281
8	Hillspeed	Ret	11	Ret	18	21	C	19	16	12^{10}	19	18	14^{4}	14	10	14^{6}	19	18	20^{2}	16	14	10^{4}	16	17	15^{5}	128
8	Hillspeed							21	17	15^{6}							20	20	Ret							128
9	Arden Motorsport																			11	11	14				22
Pos	Team	R1	R2	R3	R4	R5	R6	R7	R8	R9	R10	R11	R12	R13	R14	R15	R16	R17	R18	R19	R20	R21	R22	R23	R24	Pts
Pos	Team	OUL (United Kingdom)			SIL1 (United Kingdom)			SPA (Belgium)			HUN (Hungary)			ZAN (Netherlands)			SIL2 (United Kingdom)			DON (United Kingdom)			BRH (United Kingdom)			Pts
