= Sebastian Murray =

Scottish racing driver (born 2007)

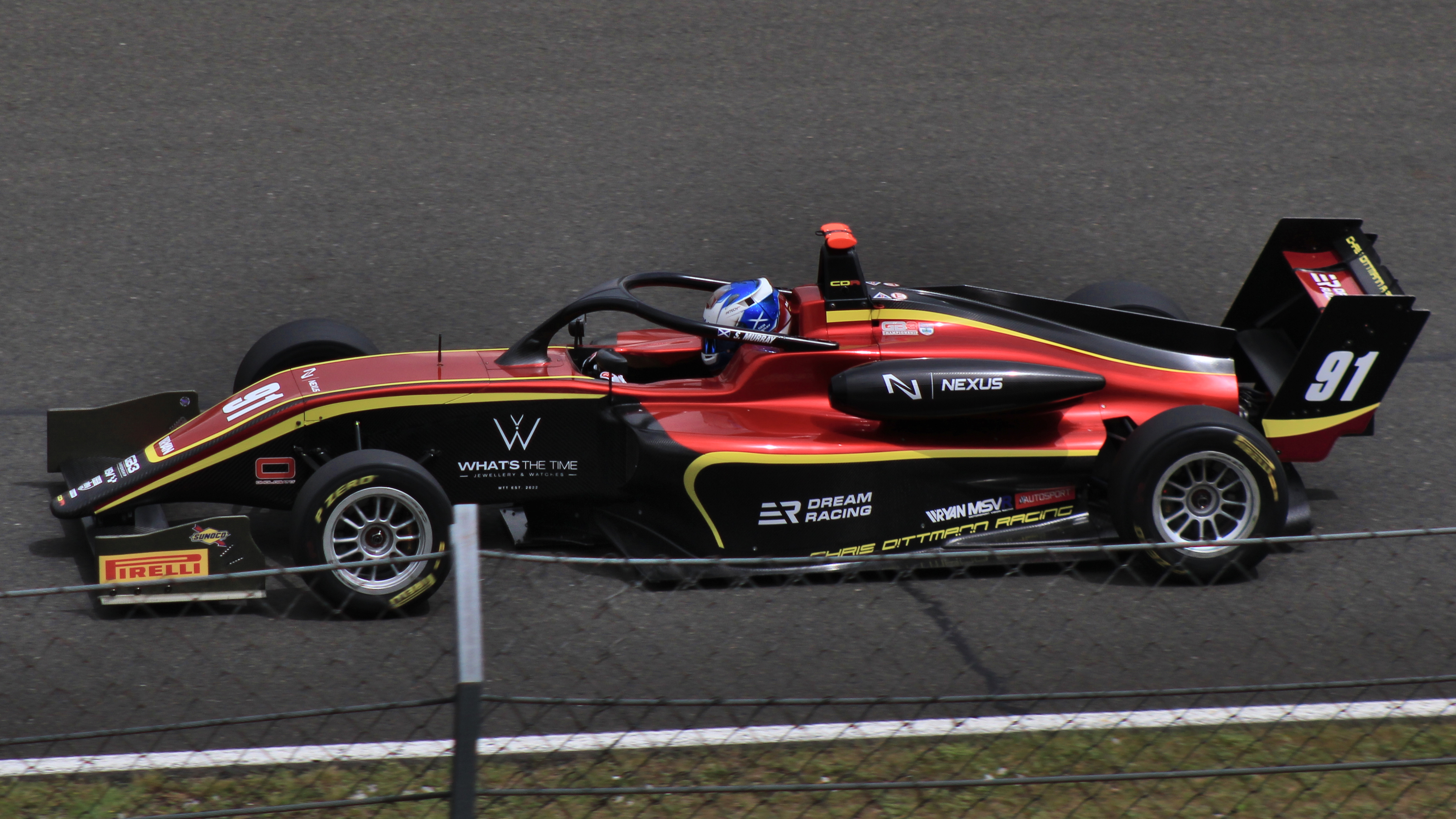
- Murray at the Hungaroring in 2024
- Nationality: (Scotland) Scottish (United Kingdom) British
- Born: 2 April 2007 (age 19) Scotland

Indy NXT career
- Debut season: 2025
- Current team: Andretti Cape Indy NXT
- Car number: 2
- Starts: 30 (31 entries)
- Wins: 0
- Podiums: 0
- Poles: 0
- Fastest laps: 0
- Best finish: 13th in 2025, 2026

Previous series
- 2024 2023–2024 2023 2023: GB3 Championship; Formula 4 UAE Championship; GB4 Championship; F4 Spanish Championship

Sebastian Murray (born 2 April 2007) is a Scottish racing driver who currently competes in the 2025 Indy NXT season with Andretti Cape Indy NXT. He previously competed for Chris Dittmann Racing in the 2024 GB3 Championship.

== Career ==
=== Karting ===
Murray had a karting career which was mostly based in the UAE. He competed in Europe in the IAME Euro Series, however, taking a best race result of 17th in the series.

=== Formula 4 ===
==== 2022 ====
Murray made his car racing debut at the Abu Dhabi Grand Prix, in the Formula 4 UAE Trophy Round, driving for Xcel Motorsport. He finished eighth and ninth in the two races respectively.

==== 2023 ====
It was confirmed that Murray would drive for Italian team Cram Motorsport for the full 2023 Formula 4 UAE Championship season. Murray would go on to get a best result of thirteenth place at Kuwait Motor Town as he finished 30th in the drivers' standings. Over the course of the year, Murray made some sporadic F4 appearances whilst dedicating the year to testing Formula 4 cars. He drove two rounds of the 2023 GB4 Championship with Graham Brunton Racing and driving a single round of the 2023 F4 Spanish Championship for Saintéloc Racing.

==== 2024 ====
On 24 November 2023, Hitech Pulse-Eight announced that Murray would be driving one of their four cars for the 2024 Formula 4 UAE season. This proved to be a breakthrough season for Murray, as he scored 12 points with a best result of fifth at the Yas Marina Circuit on his way to nineteenth in the drivers' championship.

=== GB3 Championship ===
On 26 February 2024, Murray announced his graduation from Formula 4 to the GB3 Championship, as he moved to Chris Dittmann Racing for the full 2024 season. Murray had a strong debut, with a best result of seventh at Oulton Park in Cheshire, against more experienced opposition. However, Murray had a tough remainder of the season, and did not better this result as he finished eighteenth in the standings, although he finished ahead of his Filipino teammate Flynn Jackes.

=== Indy NXT ===
==== 2025 ====
In 2025, Murray switched stateside for his racing programme, competing in the Indy NXT with Andretti Cape Indy NXT. Murray struggled in the first half of the season, as he only finished inside the top ten once. In the eighth round of the season at Mid-Ohio, Murray was racing with teammate Ricardo Escotto on lap 4 when their tires made contact, just as Escotto was attempting to overtake Murray. The two cars spun directly into the barriers, and Murray's car got airborne upon impact and flipped upside-down before coming to rest in the middle of the track. Murray was not cleared to race at Iowa Speedway the following week.

==== 2026 ====
Murray remained with Andretti for the 2026 Indy NXT season.

== Personal life ==
Murray's younger brother Max is currently karting in the UAE.

== Karting record ==
=== Karting career summary ===
Season	Series	Team	Position
2017-18	IAME Series UAE - Cadet		15th
2018-19	IAME Series UAE - Cadet		16th
2019-20	IAME Series UAE - X30 Junior		3rd
2020-21	IAME Series UAE - X30 Junior		7th
2021	IAME Euro Series - X30 Junior	KR-Sport	35th
2021-22	IAME Series UAE - X30 Senior		9th
2022	IAME Euro Series - X30 Senior	KR-Sport	55th
2022-23	IAME Series UAE - X30 Senior		8th

== Racing record ==
=== Racing career summary ===
Season	Series	Team	Races	Wins	Poles	F/Laps	Podiums	Points	Position
2022	Formula 4 UAE Championship - Trophy Round	Xcel Motorsport	2	0	0	0	0	N/A	NC
2023	Formula 4 UAE Championship	Cram Motorsport	15	0	0	0	0	0	30th
2023	GB4 Championship	Graham Brunton Racing	6	0	0	0	0	62	17th
2023	F4 Spanish Championship	Saintéloc Racing	3	0	0	0	0	0	39th
2024	Formula 4 UAE Championship	Hitech Pulse-Eight	15	0	0	0	0	12	19th
2024	GB3 Championship	Chris Dittmann Racing	23	0	0	0	0	111	18th
2025	Indy NXT	Andretti Cape Indy NXT	13	0	0	0	0	230	13th
2026	Indy NXT	Andretti Global	17	0	0	0	0	306	13th

* Season still in progress.

=== Complete Formula 4 UAE Championship results ===
(key) (Races in bold indicate pole position) (Races in italics indicate fastest lap)

Year	Entrant	1	2	3	4	5	6	7	8	9	10	11	12	13	14	15	DC	Points
2023	Cram Motorsport	DUB1; 1; 35	DUB1; 2; 35	DUB1; 3; 26	KMT1; 1; 21	KMT1; 2; 26	KMT1; 3; 32	KMT2; 1; 27	KMT2; 2; 13	KMT2; 3; 26	DUB2; 1; 21	DUB2; 2; 24	DUB2; 3; 24	YMC; 1; 30†	YMC; 2 Ret	YMC; 3; 25	30th	0
2024	Hitech Pulse-Eight	YMC1; 1; 18	YMC1; 2; 12	YMC1; 3; 18	YMC2; 1; 15	YMC2; 2; 14	YMC2; 3 Ret	DUB1; 1; 30	DUB1; 2; 14	DUB1; 3; 10	YMC3; 1; 10	YMC3; 2; 5	YMC3; 3; 21	DUB2; 1; 20	DUB2; 2; 25	DUB2; 3; 16	19th	12

=== Complete GB4 Championship results ===
(key) (Races in bold indicate pole position) (Races in italics indicate fastest lap)

Year	Entrant	1	2	3	4	5	6	7	8	9	10	11	12	13	14	15	16	17	18	19	20	21	22	DC	Points
2023	Graham Brunton Racing	OUL; 1	OUL; 2	OUL; 3	SIL1; 1	SIL1; 2	SIL1; 3	DON1; 1	DON1; 2	DON1; 3	DON1; 4	SNE; 1	SNE; 2	SNE; 3	SIL2; 1	SIL2; 2	SIL2; 3	BRH; 1; 11	BRH; 2; 11	BRH; 3; 9^{3}	DON2; 1; 11	DON2; 2; 9	DON2; 3; 9^{3}	17th	62

=== Complete GB3 Championship results ===
(key) (Races in bold indicate pole position) (Races in italics indicate fastest lap)

Year	Team	1	2	3	4	5	6	7	8	9	10	11	12	13	14	15	16	17	18	19	20	21	22	23	24	DC	Points
2024	Chris Dittmann Racing	OUL; 1; 15	OUL; 2; 13	OUL; 3; 7	SIL1; 1; 19	SIL1; 2 Ret	SIL1; 3 C	SPA; 1; 16	SPA; 2; 8	SPA; 3 DSQ	HUN; 1; 17	HUN; 2; 15	HUN; 3 Ret	ZAN; 1 Ret	ZAN; 2; 7	ZAN; 3 Ret	SIL2; 1; 14	SIL2; 2; 13	SIL2; 3; 14	DON; 1; 13	DON; 2; 20	DON; 3; 16^{3}	BRH; 1; 15	BRH; 2; 18	BRH; 3; 13^{2}	18th	111

=== American open–wheel racing results ===
==== Indy NXT ====
(key) (Races in bold indicate pole position) (Races in italics indicate fastest lap) (Races with ^{L} indicate a race lap led) (Races with * indicate most race laps led)

Year	Team	1	2	3	4	5	6	7	8	9	10	11	12	13	14	15	16	17	Rank	Points
2025	Andretti Cape	STP; 17	BAR; 16	IMS; 12	IMS; 12	DET; 6	GMP; 12	RDA; 11	MOH; 18	IOW; Wth	LAG; 17	LAG; 5	POR; 16	MIL; 16	NSH; 11				13rd	230
2026	Andretti Global	STP; 4	ARL; 7	BAR; 22	BAR; 10	IMS; 20	IMS; 9	DET; 5	GAT; 12	ROA; 13	ROA; 15	MOH; 15	MOH; 15	NSS; 13	POR; 15	MIL; 11	LAG; 22	LAG; 11	13rd	306

* Season still in progress.
