= UAE Touring Car Championship =

- Category: Touring cars
- Country: United Arab Emirates
- Drivers' champion: (Greece) Costas Papantonis / Alexandros Annivas
- Official website: dubaiautodrome.ae

The UAE Touring Car Championship is a touring car racing series that takes place each year in the United Arab Emirates.

The UAETCC consists of three classes. Class 1 uses cars built to Super 2000 or BTC Touring regulations. Class 2 uses Super Production regulations for cars with engine capacities of not more than 2000 cc. Class 3 is a 1600 cc class and is the most production-based of the three. From the season 2011-2012 Class 3 became Clio Cup class using the Clio Cup 195 & 200 Cup cars based on the X85 chassis, while from the season 2018–19, the national championship introduced a TCR class in races and whole Championship renamed in 2019–2020 season as UAE Procar Championship in order to accommodate GT Cars in the same grid.

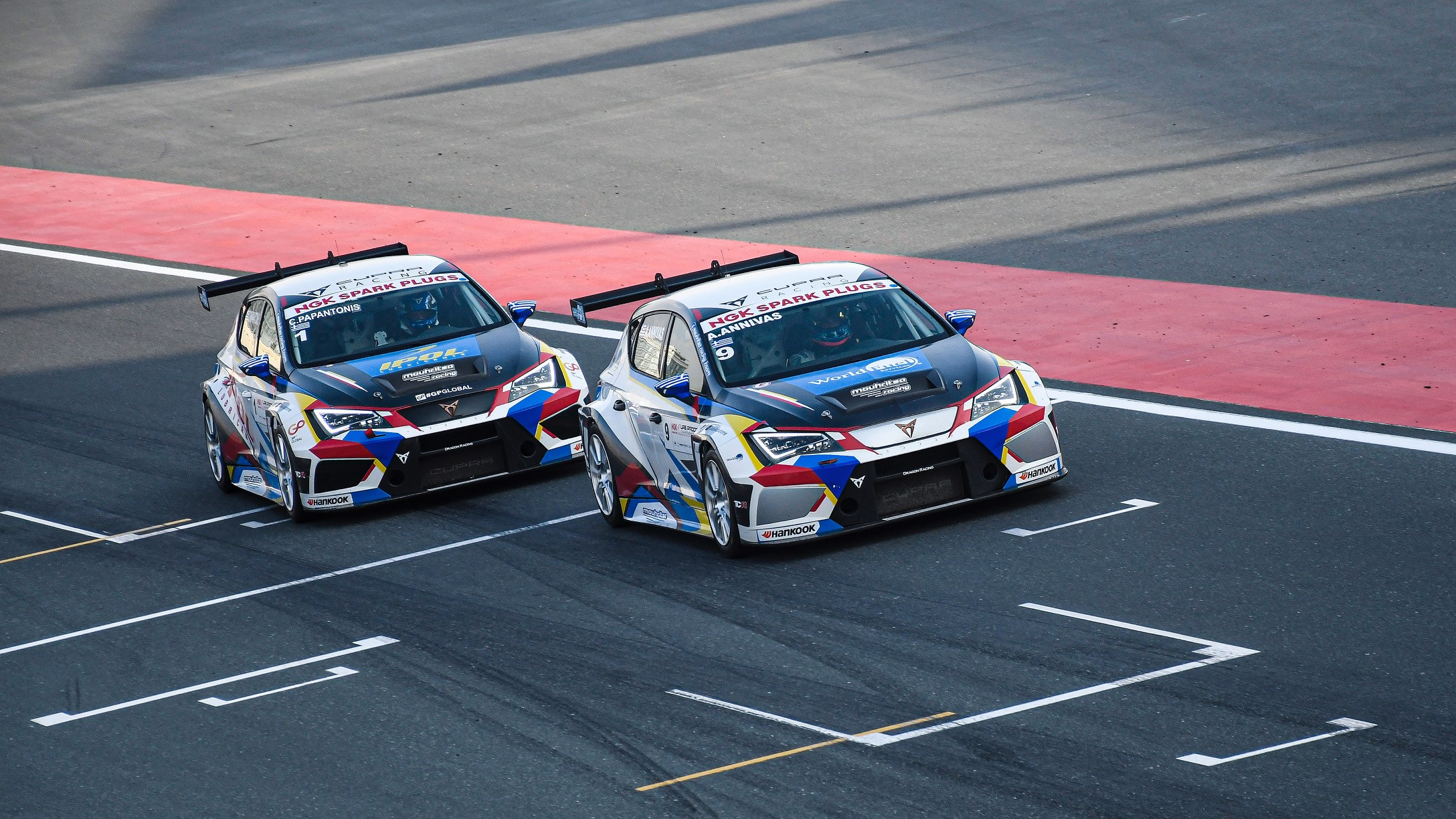
Alexandros Annivas (#9) and Costas Papantonis (#1) of Mouhritsa Racing by Dragon

== Champions ==
Season	Class 1 Champion	Class 2 Champion	Class 3 Champion	Class 4 Champion
2008–09	(United Arab Emirates) Karim Al-Azhari	(United Arab Emirates) Raed Hassan	(Greece) Costas Papantonis	(United Arab Emirates) Mohammed Al Owais
Season	Class 1 Champion	Class 2 Champion	Class 3 Champion	
2009–10	(United Kingdom) Jonathan Simmonds	(Pakistan) Umair Ahmed Khan	(United Arab Emirates) Rupesh Channake	
2010–11	(United Arab Emirates) Khalid Bin Hadher	(Pakistan) Umair Ahmed Khan	(India) Mario Dias	
2011–12	(Jordan) Nader Zuhour	(Pakistan) Umair Ahmed Khan	(Greece) Alexandros Annivas	
2012–13	(Greece) Costas Papantonis	(Sri Lanka) Rupesh Channake	(United Kingdom) Ramzi Moutran	
2013–14	(Greece) Costas Papantonis	(Republic of Ireland) Jonathan Mullan	(Greece) Alexandros Annivas	
Season	Class 1 Champion	Class 2 Champion	Clio Cup Champion	
2014–15	(Greece) Costas Papantonis	(Greece) Alexandros Annivas	(Greece) Alexandros Annivas	
2015–16	(Greece) Costas Papantonis	(Saudi Arabia) Al-Qassim Hamidaddin	(Greece) Alexandros Annivas	
2016–17	(Greece) Costas Papantonis	(Sri Lanka) Ashan Silva	(United Kingdom) Wille Morisson	
2017–18	(Greece) Costas Papantonis (Greece) Alexandros Annivas	(Republic of Ireland) Jonathan Mullin (Pakistan) Umair Ahmed Khan	(United Kingdom) Wille Morisson	
Season	Class 1 Champion	Class 2 Champion	TCR Champion	Clio Cup Champion
2018–19	(Greece) Alexandros Annivas		(Greece) Costas Papantonis	(United Kingdom) Wille Morisson
2019–20	(Greece) Alexandros Annivas		(Greece) Costas Papantonis	(United Arab Emirates) Mohammed Abdulghaffar Hussain
2020–21		(United Kingdom) Johnathan Mullan / Ricky Coomber	(Greece) Alexandros Annivas	(United Arab Emirates) Ahmad Al Moosa
