= 2006 FIA GT Dubai 500km =

The layout of the Dubai Autodrome.

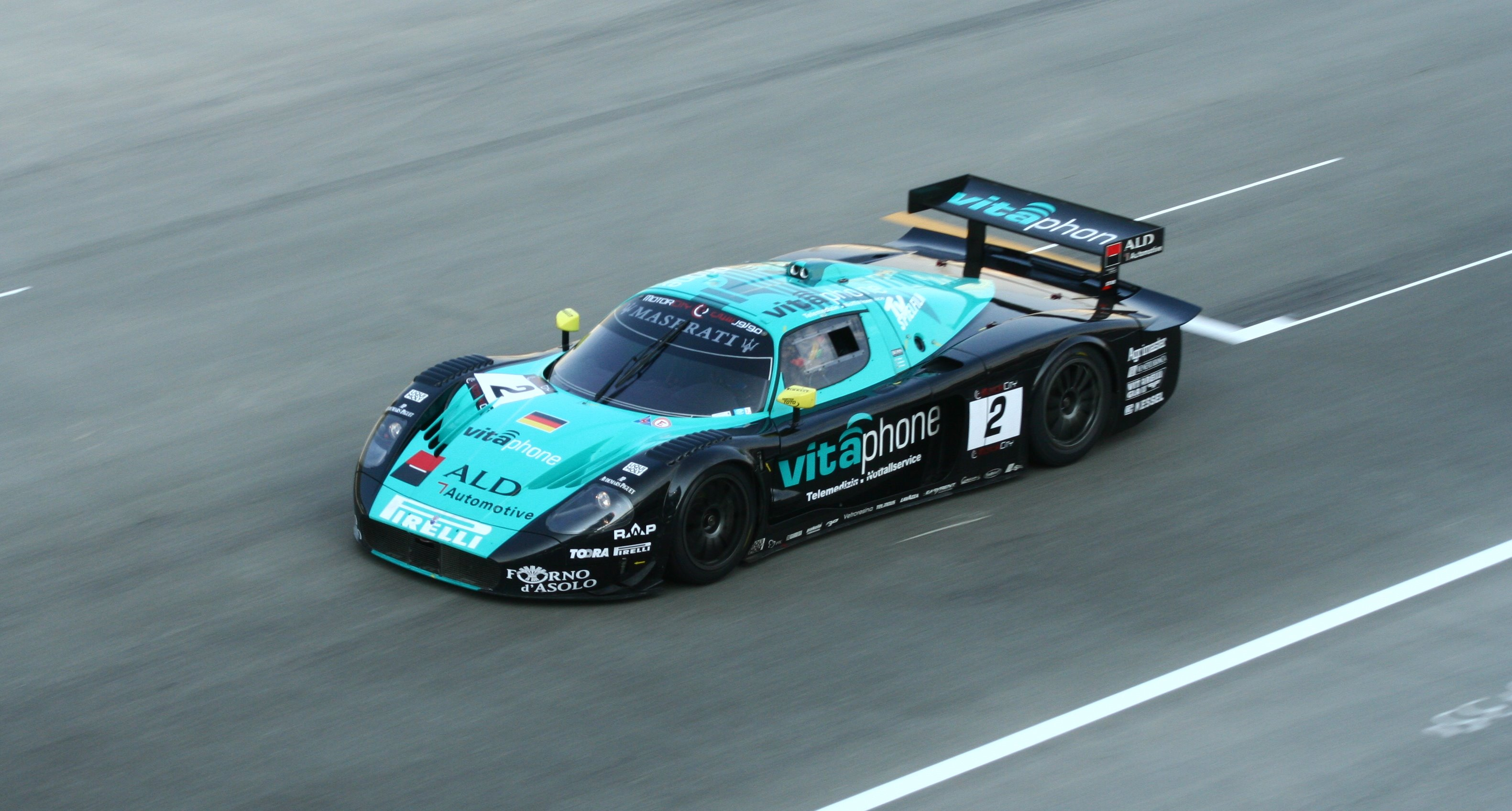
Third place Maserati MC12

The 2006 FIA GT Motor City GT 500 was the final race for the 2006 FIA GT Championship season. It took place on November 18, 2006.

== Official results ==
Class winners in bold. Cars failing to complete 70% of winner's distance marked as Not Classified (NC).

Pos	Class	No	Team	Drivers	Chassis	Tyre	Laps
Pos	Class	No	Team	Drivers	Engine	Tyre	Laps
1	**GT1**	**5**	**(Germany) Phoenix Racing**	**(Italy) Andrea Piccini (Switzerland) Jean-Denis Délétraz**	**Aston Martin DBR9**	MI	**89**
1	**GT1**	**5**	**(Germany) Phoenix Racing**	**(Italy) Andrea Piccini (Switzerland) Jean-Denis Délétraz**	**Aston Martin 6.0L V12**	MI	**89**
2	GT1	4	(Belgium) GLPK-Carsport	(Netherlands) Mike Hezemans (Belgium) Bert Longin (Belgium) Anthony Kumpen	Chevrolet Corvette C6.R	MI	89
2	GT1	4	(Belgium) GLPK-Carsport	(Netherlands) Mike Hezemans (Belgium) Bert Longin (Belgium) Anthony Kumpen	Chevrolet 7.0L V8	MI	89
3	GT1	2	(Germany) Vitaphone Racing Team	(Italy) Thomas Biagi (United Kingdom) Jamie Davies (Belgium) Vincent Vosse	Maserati MC12 GT1	P	89
3	GT1	2	(Germany) Vitaphone Racing Team	(Italy) Thomas Biagi (United Kingdom) Jamie Davies (Belgium) Vincent Vosse	Maserati 6.0L V12	P	89
4	GT1	23	(Italy) Aston Martin Racing BMS	(Italy) Matteo Malucelli (Italy) Fabio Babini	Aston Martin DBR9	P	89
4	GT1	23	(Italy) Aston Martin Racing BMS	(Italy) Matteo Malucelli (Italy) Fabio Babini	Aston Martin 6.0L V12	P	89
5	GT1	33	(Austria) Race Alliance	(Austria) Karl Wendlinger (Austria) Philipp Peter (Czech Republic) Jaroslav Janiš	Aston Martin DBR9	D	88
5	GT1	33	(Austria) Race Alliance	(Austria) Karl Wendlinger (Austria) Philipp Peter (Czech Republic) Jaroslav Janiš	Aston Martin 6.0L V12	D	88
6	GT1	24	(Italy) Aston Martin Racing BMS	(Italy) Fabrizio Gollin (Portugal) Miguel Ramos	Aston Martin DBR9	P	88
6	GT1	24	(Italy) Aston Martin Racing BMS	(Italy) Fabrizio Gollin (Portugal) Miguel Ramos	Aston Martin 6.0L V12	P	88
7	**G2**	**3**	**(France) Larbre Compétition**	**(Switzerland) Gabriele Gardel (Switzerland) Steve Zacchia (France) Frédéric Makowiecki**	**Ferrari 550-GTS Maranello Evo**	MI	**86**
7	**G2**	**3**	**(France) Larbre Compétition**	**(Switzerland) Gabriele Gardel (Switzerland) Steve Zacchia (France) Frédéric Makowiecki**	**Ferrari 5.9L V12**	MI	**86**
8	**GT2**	**63**	**(United Kingdom) Scuderia Ecosse**	**(United Kingdom) Tim Mullen (Canada) Chris Niarchos**	**Ferrari F430 GT2**	MI	**85**
8	**GT2**	**63**	**(United Kingdom) Scuderia Ecosse**	**(United Kingdom) Tim Mullen (Canada) Chris Niarchos**	**Ferrari 4.0L V8**	MI	**85**
9	GT2	58	(Italy) AF Corse	(Brazil) Jaime Melo (Finland) Toni Vilander	Ferrari F430 GT2	P	85
9	GT2	58	(Italy) AF Corse	(Brazil) Jaime Melo (Finland) Toni Vilander	Ferrari 4.0L V8	P	85
10	GT2	59	(Italy) AF Corse	(Finland) Mika Salo (Portugal) Rui Águas	Ferrari F430 GT2	P	85
10	GT2	59	(Italy) AF Corse	(Finland) Mika Salo (Portugal) Rui Águas	Ferrari 4.0L V8	P	85
11	GT1	1	(Germany) Vitaphone Racing Team	(Germany) Michael Bartels (Italy) Andrea Bertolini (Belgium) Eric van de Poele	Maserati MC12 GT1	P	85
11	GT1	1	(Germany) Vitaphone Racing Team	(Germany) Michael Bartels (Italy) Andrea Bertolini (Belgium) Eric van de Poele	Maserati 6.0L V12	P	85
12	GT2	79	(Netherlands) Spyker Squadron b.v.	(Netherlands) Jeroen Bleekemolen (United Kingdom) Jonny Kane	Spyker C8 Spyder GT2-R	MI	85
12	GT2	79	(Netherlands) Spyker Squadron b.v.	(Netherlands) Jeroen Bleekemolen (United Kingdom) Jonny Kane	Audi 3.8L V8	MI	85
13	GT2	55	(Monaco) JMB Racing	(United Kingdom) Tim Sugden (Switzerland) Iradj Alexander	Ferrari F430 GT2	P	85
13	GT2	55	(Monaco) JMB Racing	(United Kingdom) Tim Sugden (Switzerland) Iradj Alexander	Ferrari 4.0L V8	P	85
14	GT2	75	(Italy) Ebimotors	(France) Emmanuel Collard (Germany) Mike Rockenfeller	Porsche 911 GT3-RSR	P	85
14	GT2	75	(Italy) Ebimotors	(France) Emmanuel Collard (Germany) Mike Rockenfeller	Porsche 3.6L Flat-6	P	85
15	GT2	74	(Italy) Ebimotors	(Italy) Luigi Moccia (Italy) Emanuele Busnelli	Porsche 911 GT3-RSR	P	84
15	GT2	74	(Italy) Ebimotors	(Italy) Luigi Moccia (Italy) Emanuele Busnelli	Porsche 3.6L Flat-6	P	84
16	GT2	66	(Germany) Team Felbermayr-Proton	(Germany) Christian Ried (Austria) Horst Felbermayr Jr.	Porsche 911 GT3-RSR	MI	84
16	GT2	66	(Germany) Team Felbermayr-Proton	(Germany) Christian Ried (Austria) Horst Felbermayr Jr.	Porsche 3.6L Flat-6	MI	84
17	**G3**	**133**	**(Italy) BMS Scuderia Italia**	**(Italy) Luca Pirri Ardizzone (Switzerland) Toni Seiler**	**Aston Martin DBRS9**	P	**81**
17	**G3**	**133**	**(Italy) BMS Scuderia Italia**	**(Italy) Luca Pirri Ardizzone (Switzerland) Toni Seiler**	**Aston Martin 6.0L V12**	P	**81**
18	GT2	62	(United Kingdom) Scuderia Ecosse	(United Kingdom) Nathan Kinch (United Kingdom) Marino Franchitti	Ferrari F430 GT2	MI	81
18	GT2	62	(United Kingdom) Scuderia Ecosse	(United Kingdom) Nathan Kinch (United Kingdom) Marino Franchitti	Ferrari 4.0L V8	MI	81
19	GT2	56	(Monaco) JMB Racing	(Italy) Andrea Garbagnati (Netherlands) Peter Kutemann	Ferrari F430 GT2	P	81
19	GT2	56	(Monaco) JMB Racing	(Italy) Andrea Garbagnati (Netherlands) Peter Kutemann	Ferrari 4.0L V8	P	81
20	GT2	99	(Austria) Race Alliance	(Austria) Lukas Lichtner-Hoyer (Austria) Thomas Gruber	Porsche 911 GT3-RSR	D	81
20	GT2	99	(Austria) Race Alliance	(Austria) Lukas Lichtner-Hoyer (Austria) Thomas Gruber	Porsche 3.6L Flat-6	D	81
21	G3	122	(Monaco) JMB Racing	(France) Nicolas Comar (France) Philippe Rambeaud (France) Michel Mhitarian	Ferrari F430 Challenge	MI	77
21	G3	122	(Monaco) JMB Racing	(France) Nicolas Comar (France) Philippe Rambeaud (France) Michel Mhitarian	Ferrari 4.3L V8	MI	77
22	GT1	9	(Germany) Zakspeed Racing	(Germany) Sascha Bert (Italy) Andrea Montermini (Netherlands) Jos Menten	Saleen S7-R	MI	74
22	GT1	9	(Germany) Zakspeed Racing	(Germany) Sascha Bert (Italy) Andrea Montermini (Netherlands) Jos Menten	Ford 7.0L V8	MI	74
23	GT2	69	(Germany) Team Felbermayr-Proton	(Germany) Gerold Ried (Austria) Horst Felbermayr Sr.	Porsche 911 GT3-RS	MI	71
23	GT2	69	(Germany) Team Felbermayr-Proton	(Germany) Gerold Ried (Austria) Horst Felbermayr Sr.	Porsche 3.6L Flat-6	MI	71
24 DNF	GT2	80	(Netherlands) Spyker Squadron b.v.	(Netherlands) Peter Kox (United Kingdom) Peter Dumbreck	Spyker C8 Spyder GT2-R	MI	43
24 DNF	GT2	80	(Netherlands) Spyker Squadron b.v.	(Netherlands) Peter Kox (United Kingdom) Peter Dumbreck	Audi 3.8L V8	MI	43
25 DNF	GT2	77	(Slovakia) Autoracing Club Bratislava	(Slovakia) Miro Konopka (Slovakia) Štefan Rosina	Porsche 911 GT3-RS	D	23
25 DNF	GT2	77	(Slovakia) Autoracing Club Bratislava	(Slovakia) Miro Konopka (Slovakia) Štefan Rosina	Porsche 3.6L Flat-6	D	23
26 DNF	G2	101	(Belgium) Belgian Racing	(Belgium) Bas Leinders (Belgium) Renaud Kuppens	Gillet Vertigo Streiff	D	11
26 DNF	G2	101	(Belgium) Belgian Racing	(Belgium) Bas Leinders (Belgium) Renaud Kuppens	Alfa Romeo 3.6L V6	D	11
27 DNF	G3	115	(Italy) BMS Scuderia Italia	(Russia) Sergei Zlobin (Italy) Marcello Zani (Italy) Roberto Benucci	Aston Martin DBRS9	P	1
27 DNF	G3	115	(Italy) BMS Scuderia Italia	(Russia) Sergei Zlobin (Italy) Marcello Zani (Italy) Roberto Benucci	Aston Martin 6.0L V12	P	1

== Statistics ==
- Pole Position – #3 Larbre Competition – 1:55.987
- Average Speed – 158.4 km/h

FIA GT Championship
Previous race: 2006 FIA GT Adria 500km	2006 season	Next race: None
