= Chloe Grant =

British racing driver (born 2006)

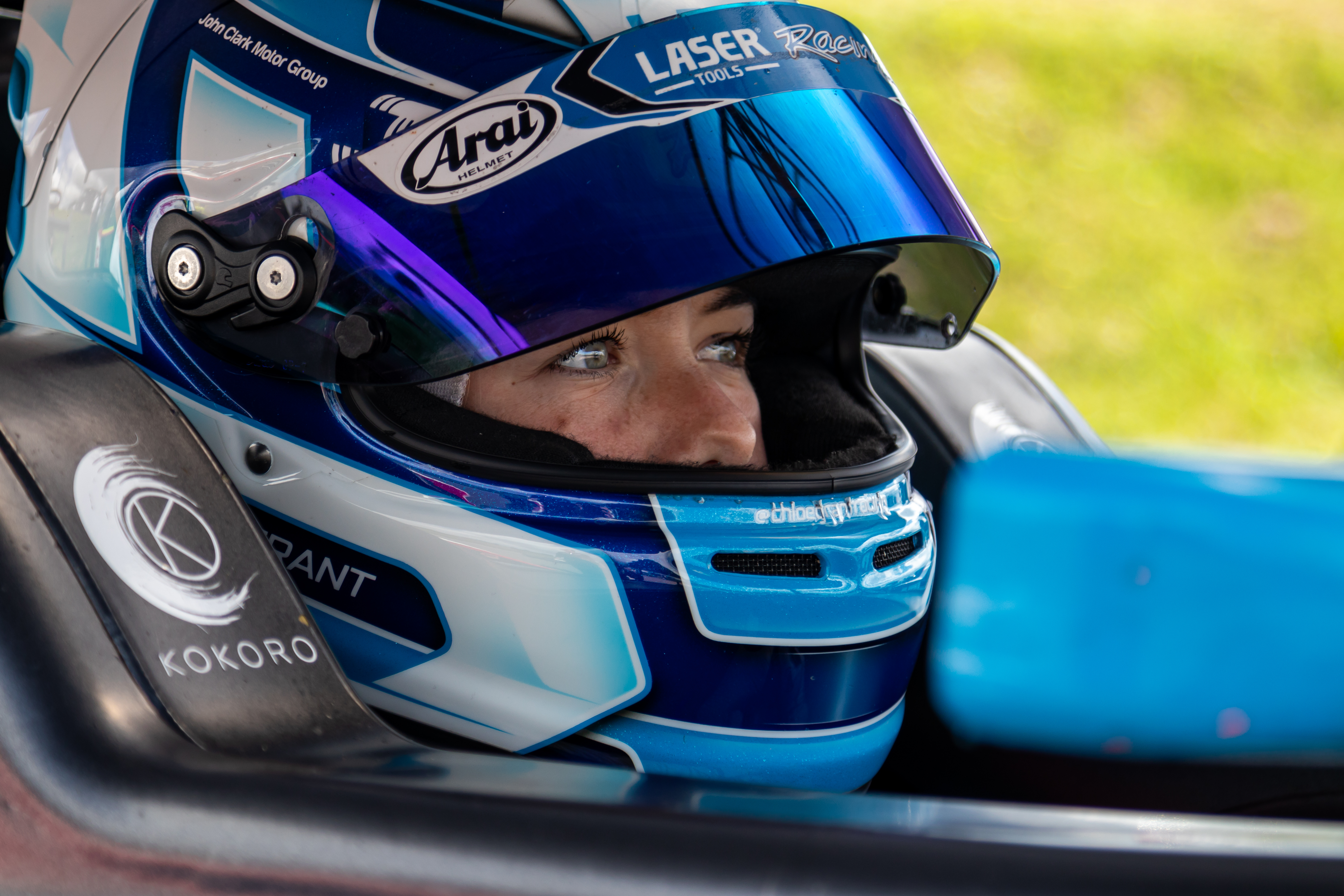
- Grant in 2024
- Nationality: British
- Born: 20 March 2006 (age 20) Perth, Scotland

F1 Academy
- Categorisation: FIA Silver
- Years active: 2023
- Teams: ART Grand Prix
- Car number: 9
- Starts: 19 (21 entries)
- Wins: 0
- Podiums: 0
- Poles: 0
- Fastest laps: 0
- Best finish: 12th in 2023

Previous series
- 2023; 2022, 2024; 2021: F1 Academy; GB4 Championship; Junior Saloon Car Championship

Chloe Grant (born 20 March 2006) is a Scottish racing driver who currently competes in the Porsche Sprint Challenge Iberica for AF Motorsport. She competed for ART Grand Prix in the 2023 F1 Academy season.

== Career ==
=== Karting ===
Grant started karting in 2013. She mainly developed her karting career in Scotland and competed in the North of Scotland Kart Club and East of Scotland Kart Club championships. In 2017, she won the East of Scotland Kart Club Championship in the Minimax non-MSA class.

In 2019, Grant won the East of Scotland Kart Club Junior Rotax Championship. In 2020, she raced again in Junior Rotax and took part in the NKF Championship where Grant placed third, and the CKRC Championship (Rowrah), where she won.

=== Junior Saloon Car Championship ===
In 2021, Grant took part in the Junior Saloon Car Championship after winning the JSCC Scholarship, in which she drove a Citroën Saxo VTR 1600 car. Grant took 14th place in the championship.

=== GB4 Championship ===
In 2022, Grant competed in the 2022 GB4 Championship with Graham Brunton Racing and finished ninth in the drivers' championship. In 2024, she rejoined GB4 with KMR Sport and achieved her first podium in the series in the first round.

=== FIA Girls on Track - Rising Stars ===
Grant was a finalist for the 2022 edition of the Girls on Track - Rising Stars shootout, a collaboration between the FIA Women in Motorsports Commission and the Ferrari Driver Academy.

=== F1 Academy ===
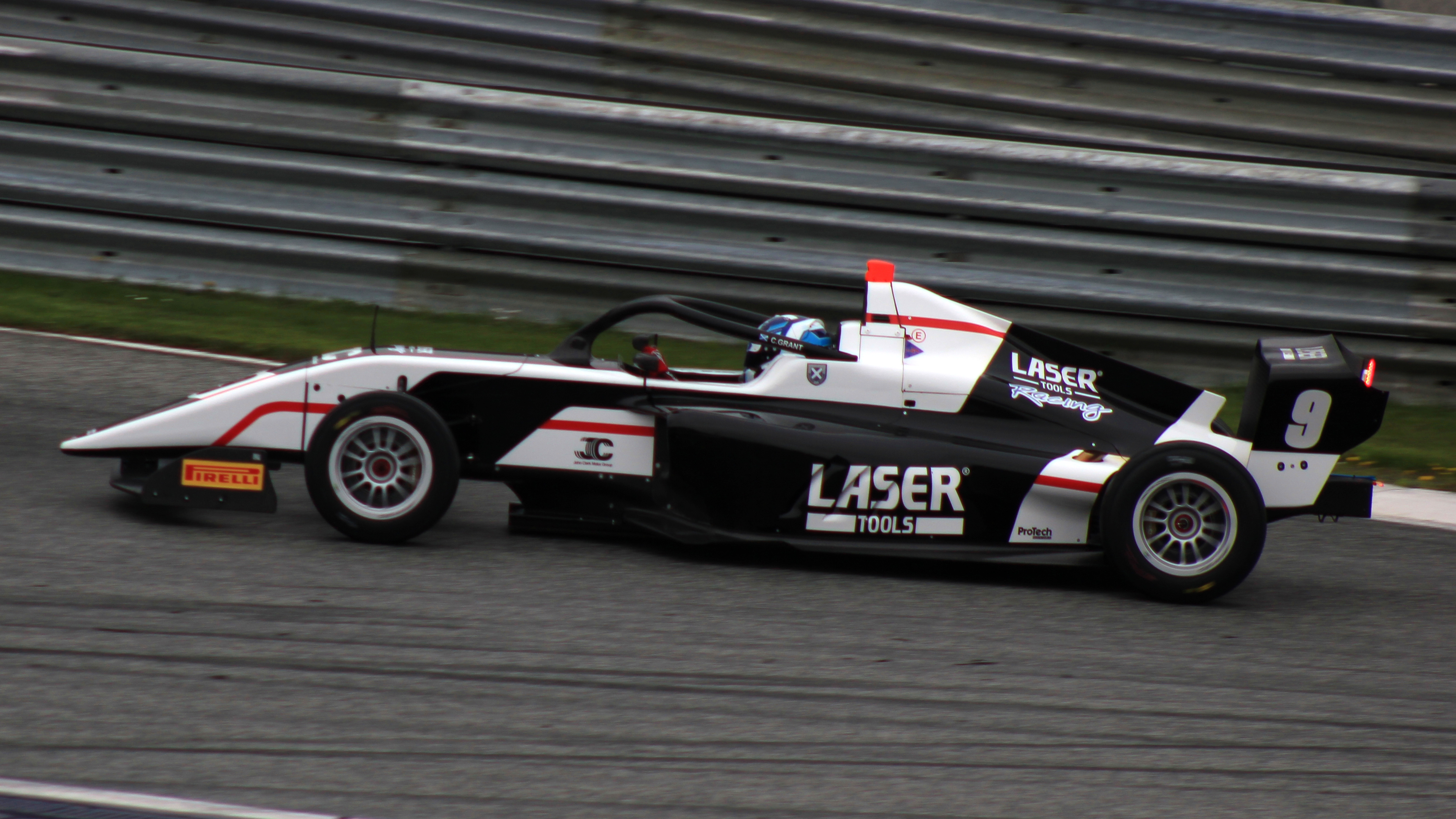
Grant competing for ART Grand Prix in an F1 Academy race at the Red Bull Ring in 2023.

On 16 March 2023, ART Grand Prix announced that Grant would compete in F1 Academy for their team. She started nineteen of the twenty-one races that season – missing two due to a rollover crash at Monza – and finished twelfth in the standings, with a highest finish of fourth.

=== 2025 ===
Grant revealed that she didn't have any racing confirmed in 2025 due to a lack of funding. She was able to do the Monteblanco weekend in the Porsche Sprint Challenge Iberica. Grant also later in the season competed in Iberian Supercars.

== Racing record ==
=== Racing career summary ===
Season	Series	Team	Races	Wins	Poles	F/Laps	Podiums	Points	Position
2021	Junior Saloon Car Championship	N/A	18	0	0	0	0	166	14th
2022	GB4 Championship	Graham Brunton Racing	24	0	0	0	0	242	9th
2023	F1 Academy	ART Grand Prix	19	0	0	0	0	34	12th
2024	GB4 Championship	KMR Sport	20	0	0	0	1	208	8th
2025	Porsche Sprint Challenge Iberica - AM	Monterios Racing Team	10	3	2	0	7	58	7th
2025	Supercars Endurance Series - GTC	Monterios Racing Team	4	1	0	0	3	57	NC
2026	Porsche Sprint Challenge Iberica - Silver Cup	AF Motorsport	12	0	0	0	8		

=== Complete GB4 Championship results ===
(key) (Races in bold indicate pole position) (Races in italics indicate fastest lap)

Year	Entrant	1	2	3	4	5	6	7	8	9	10	11	12	13	14	15	16	17	18	19	20	21	22	23	24	DC	Points
2022	Graham Brunton Racing	SNE1; 1; 11	SNE1; 2; 8	SNE1; 3 Ret	OUL; 1; 9	OUL; 2; 11	OUL; 3; 12	SIL1; 1; 13	SIL1; 2; 11	SIL1; 3; 11	DON1; 1; 12	DON1; 2; 11	DON1; 3; 11	SNE2; 1; 7	SNE2; 2; 6	SNE2; 3; 6	SIL2; 1; 8	SIL2; 2; 11	SIL2; 3; 10	BRH; 1; 7	BRH; 2; 4	BRH; 3; 5	DON2; 1; 8	DON2; 2; 7	DON2; 3 Ret	9th	242
2024	KMR Sport	OUL; 1; 8	OUL; 2; 13	OUL; 3; 2^{4}	SIL1; 1; 7	SIL1; 2 Ret	SIL1; 3 C	DON1; 1; 6	DON1; 2; 6	DON1; 3 Ret	SNE; 1 Ret	SNE; 2; 8	SNE; 3 Ret	SIL2; 1; 10	SIL2; 2; 10	SIL2; 3; 5^{3}	DON2; 1; 10	DON2; 2; 9	DON2; 3; 5	BRH; 1; 8	BRH; 2; 10	BRH; 3; 6				8th	208

=== Complete F1 Academy results ===
(key) (Races in bold indicate pole position; races in italics indicate fastest lap)

Year	Team	1	2	3	4	5	6	7	8	9	10	11	12	13	14	15	16	17	18	19	20	21	DC	Points
2023	ART Grand Prix	RBR; 1; 10	RBR; 2 Ret	RBR; 3; 9	CRT; 1; 4	CRT; 2; 7	CRT; 3; 11	CAT; 1; 7	CAT; 2; 7	CAT; 3; 11	ZAN; 1; 12	ZAN; 2; 12	ZAN; 3; 7	MNZ; 1 Ret	MNZ; 2 WD	MNZ; 3 WD	LEC; 1; 10	LEC; 2; 11	LEC; 3; 13	COA; 1 Ret	COA; 2; 9	COA; 3; 9	12th	34
