= Jack Sherwood (racing driver) =

British racing driver (born 2006)

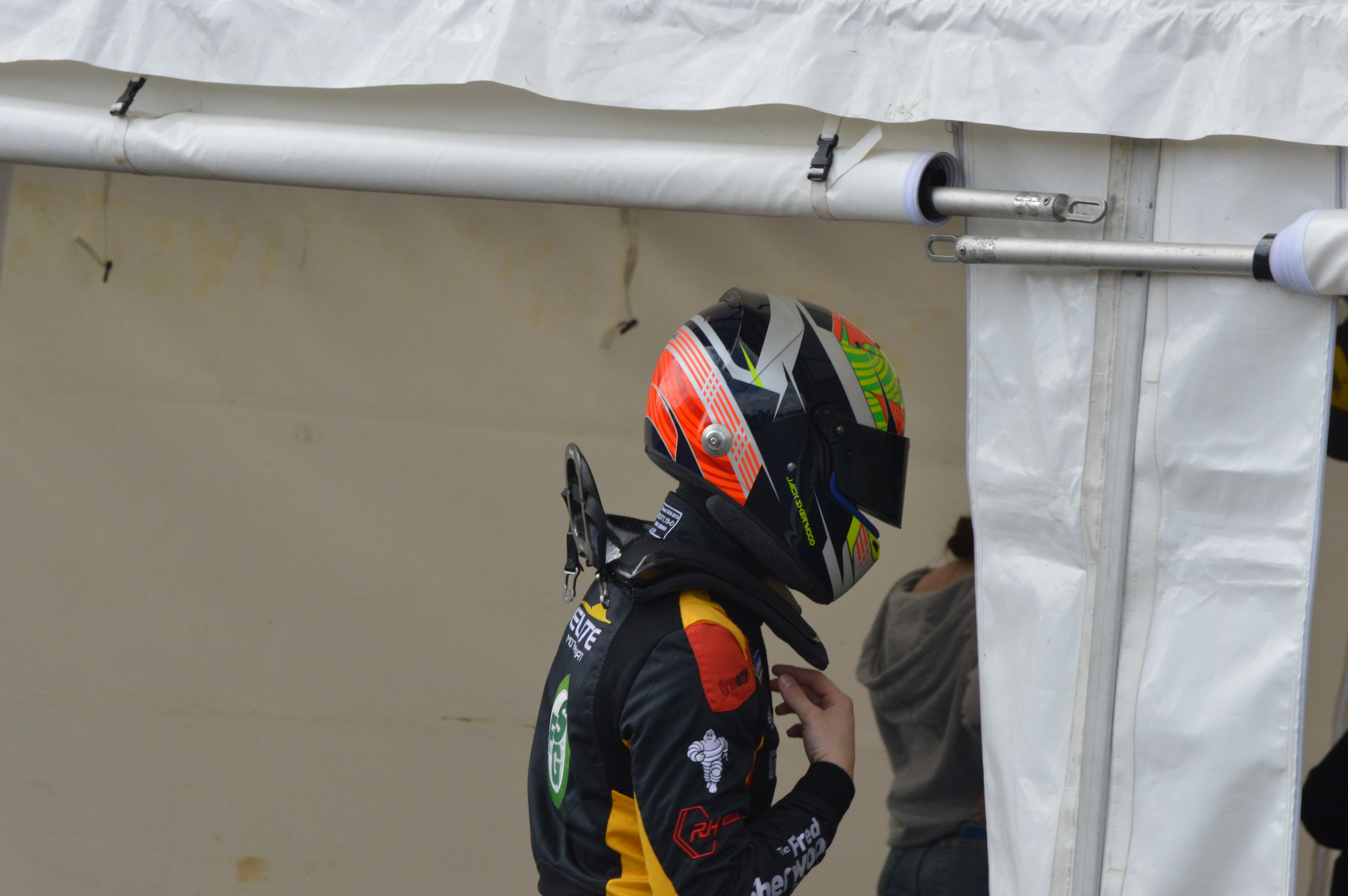
- Sherwood in 2022
- Nationality: (United Kingdom) British
- Born: 2 May 2006 (age 20) Lancashire, United Kingdom

Porsche Carrera Cup GB career
- Debut season: 2026
- Current team: Team Parker Racing
- Car number: 78
- Starts: 3
- Wins: 0
- Podiums: 0
- Poles: 0
- Fastest laps: 0
- Best finish: TBC in 2026

Previous series
- 2021 2022 2022-2024: Ginetta Junior Championship; GB4 Championship; F4 British Championship

Jack Sherwood (born 2 May 2006) is a British racing driver who competes in the Porsche Carrera Cup GB for Team Parker Racing.

== Career ==
=== Karting ===
Sherwood competed in various karting championships across the UK, most notably the LGM Series, in which he finished 36th in the Junior X30 category in 2019.

=== Ginetta Junior Championship ===
In April 2021, it was confirmed that Sherwood would be making his car racing debut in the 2021 Ginetta Junior Championship, driving for reigning champions Elite Motorsport. He had a very difficult season with the team, scoring points on fourteen occasions and securing only a best race result of 14th. He finished the season in 24th in the standings, on 50 points.

=== Formula 4 ===
==== 2022 ====
For 2022, Sherwood was confirmed to be continuing with Elite Motorsport for the inaugural season of the GB4 Championship. In the first round at Snetterton, he recorded three points finishes. After more of the same in the next round, he scored his first podium in the reverse-grid race in the third round at Silverstone. He went on to secure more podiums in the following round at Donington, and won for the first time in the series in the fifth round at the Snetterton Circuit. In the penultimate round at Brands Hatch, he won for his second and final time in the series. After a promising first year in single-seaters, Sherwood finished fifth in the final standings, finishing above his two Elite Motorsport teammates. Sherwood also contested the final four rounds of the 2022 F4 British Championship with Chris Dittmann Racing, in preparation for a full season in 2023.

==== 2023 ====
As expected, Sherwood returned to the F4 British Championship for the 2023 season. He made a strong impression in the opening round at Donington Park, securing a podium in the third race. His next podium came in the eighth round at Knockhill, as he finished third in the first race of the round. His highest placed finish, however, came in the final round at Brands Hatch. Sherwood managed to finish second in the reverse-grid race, gaining three positions in a highly impressive race. In the overall standings, Sherwood finished 15th, scoring 89 points and finishing being his two teammates.

==== 2024 ====
For 2024, it was confirmed that Sherwood would return to the F4 British Championship for a second full season, as he joined reigning champions Rodin Motorsport for the 2024 season. The first round of the season at Donington saw him finish on the podium in the reverse-grid race. He had an impressive round two rounds later at Snetterton, securing two second-placed finishes. He went on to secure four more podium finishes over the course of the season, all third-placed results. After scoring eight podiums and 230 points over the course of 2024, he finished fifth in the final standings after a long-standing fight for third place.

=== GB3 Championship ===
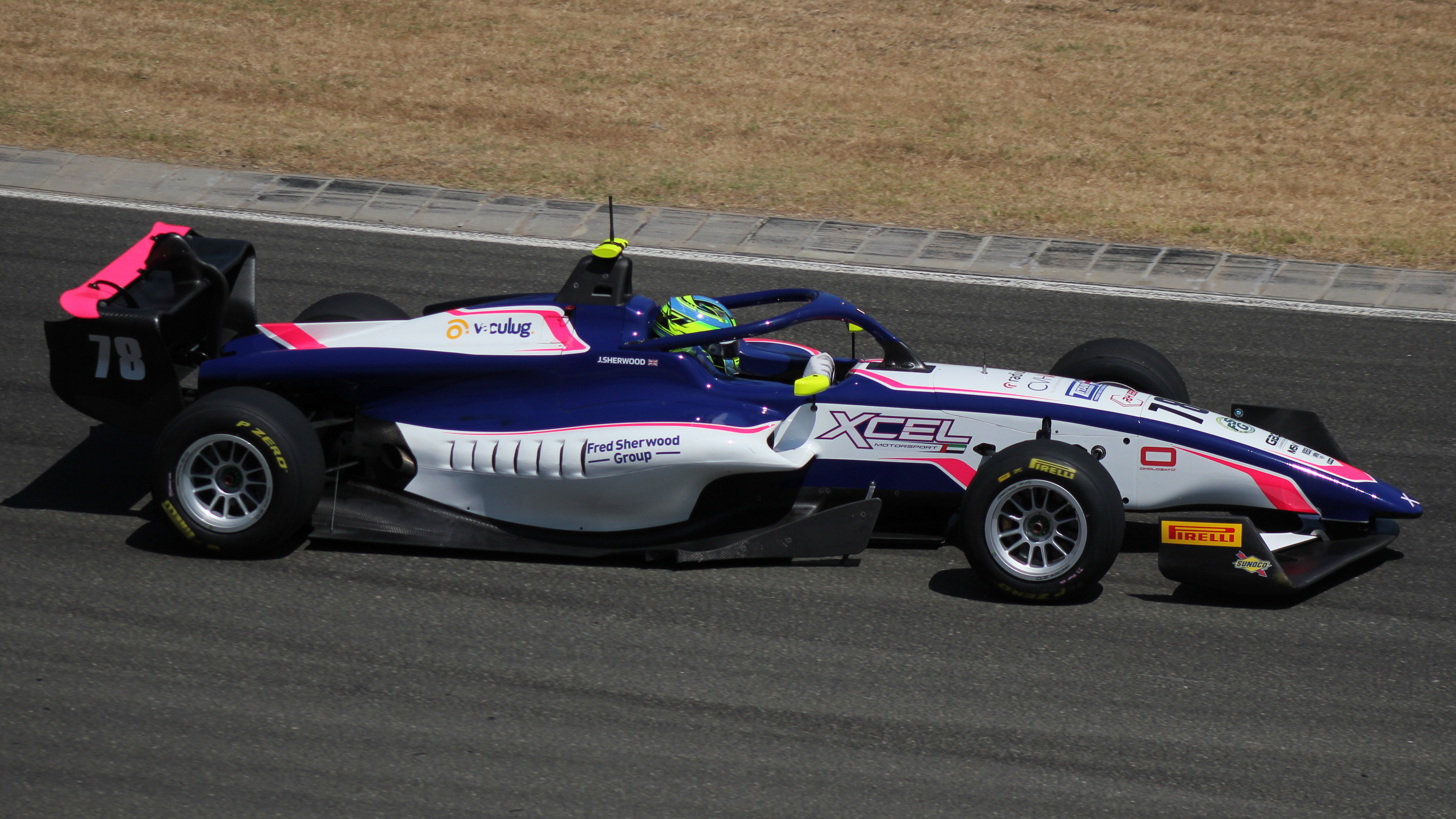
Sherwood at the Hungaroring during the 2025 GB3 Championship

==== 2023 ====
It was announced that Sherwood would join Chris Dittmann Racing for the penultimate round of the 2023 GB3 Championship, at Circuit Zandvoort in the Netherlands. His debut saw him finish 20th in the first race, and 22nd in the final race, as he did not finish the second race.

==== 2025 ====
After his 2024 F4 British Championship efforts, Sherwood earned a drive in the 2025 GB3 Championship, joining UAE-based debutants Xcel Motorsport for the season.

== Karting record ==
=== Karting career summary ===
Season	Series	Team	Position
2019	LGM Series – Junior X30	MLR	36th
2019	Kartmasters British GP - X30 Junior	MLR	NC

== Racing record ==
=== Racing career summary ===
Season	Series	Team	Races	Wins	Poles	F/Laps	Podiums	Points	Position
2021	Ginetta Junior Championship	Elite Motorsport	25	0	0	0	0	50	24th
2022	GB4 Championship	Elite Motorsport	23	2	1	5	9	417	5th
2022	F4 British Championship	Chris Dittmann Racing	12	0	0	0	0	14	18th
2023	F4 British Championship	Chris Dittmann Racing	30	0	0	0	3	89	15th
2023	GB3 Championship	Chris Dittmann Racing	3	0	0	0	0	1	27th
2024	F4 British Championship	Rodin Motorsport	29	0	0	1	8	230	5th
2025	GB3 Championship	Xcel Motorsport	24	0	0	0	1	193	13th
2026	Porsche Carrera Cup Great Britain - Pro	Team Parker Racing							

=== Complete Ginetta Junior Championship results ===
(key) (Races in bold indicate pole position) (Races in italics indicate fastest lap)

Year	Team	1	2	3	4	5	6	7	8	9	10	11	12	13	14	15	16	17	18	19	20	21	22	23	24	25	26	DC	Points
2021	Elite Motorsport	THR; 1; 22	THR; 2; 22	SNE; 1; 22	SNE; 2; 21	SNE; 3; 16	BHI; 1; 19	BHI; 2; 19	BHI; 3; 24	OUL; 1; 19	OUL; 2 C	KNO; 1; 14	KNO; 2; 18	KNO; 3 Ret	KNO; 4; 19	THR; 1; 18	THR; 2; 16	THR; 3; 16	SIL; 1; 19	SIL; 2; 23	SIL; 3; 17	DON; 1 Ret	DON; 2; 27	DON; 3; 25	BHGP; 1; 20	BHGP; 2; 14	BHGP; 3; 25	24th	50

=== Complete GB4 Championship results ===
(key) (Races in bold indicate pole position; races in italics indicate fastest lap)

Year	Team	1	2	3	4	5	6	7	8	9	10	11	12	13	14	15	16	17	18	19	20	21	22	23	24	DC	Points
2022	Elite Motorsport	SNE1; 1; 8	SNE1; 2; 7	SNE1; 3; 7	OUL; 1; 7	OUL; 2; 10	OUL; 3; 6	SIL1; 1; 5	SIL1; 2; 5	SIL1; 3; 3^{8}	DON1; 1; 6	DON1; 2; 3	DON1; 3; 2^{5}	SNE2; 1; 3	SNE2; 2; 3	SNE2; 3; 1^{3}	SIL2; 1 Ret	SIL2; 2; 6	SIL2; 3; 5^{4}	BRH; 1; 2	BRH; 2; 3	BRH; 3; 1^{3}	**DON2**; **1** DNS	DON2; 2; 5	DON2; 3; 4^{9}	5th	417

=== Complete F4 British Championship results ===
(key) (Races in bold indicate pole position) (Races in italics indicate fastest lap)

Year	Team	1	2	3	4	5	6	7	8	9	10	11	12	13	14	15	16	17	18	19	20	21	22	23	24	25	26	27	28	29	30	31	32	DC	Points
2022	Chris Dittmann Racing	DON; 1	DON; 2	DON; 3	BHI; 1	BHI; 2	BHI; 3	THR1; 1	THR1; 2	THR1; 3	OUL; 1	OUL; 2	OUL; 3	CRO; 1	CRO; 2	CRO; 3	KNO; 1	KNO; 2	KNO; 3	SNE; 1; 14	SNE; 2; 11^{3}	SNE; 3; 9	THR2; 1; 13	THR2; 2; 13^{2}	THR2; 3; 11	SIL; 1; 8	SIL; 2; 15^{2}	SIL; 3; 12	BHGP; 1; 13	BHGP; 2; 14	BHGP; 3; 10			18th	14
2023	Chris Dittmann Racing	DPN; 1; 13	DPN; 2; 11^{2}	DPN; 3; 3	BHI; 1; 16	BHI; 1; 16	BHI; 3 Ret	SNE; 1 C	SNE; 2; 15	SNE; 3; 11	THR; 1; 17	THR; 2; 6	THR; 3; 14	OUL; 1; 11	OUL; 2; 4^{3}	OUL; 3; 12	SIL; 1; 13	SIL; 2 Ret	SIL; 3; 16	CRO; 1 Ret	CRO; 2; 4^{1}	CRO; 3; 11	KNO; 1; 3	KNO; 2; 6^{6}	KNO; 3; 8	DPGP; 1; 13	DPGP; 2; 9	DPGP; 3; 19	DPGP; 4; 18	BHGP; 1; 9	BHGP; 2; 2^{3}	BHGP; 3; 18		15th	89
2024	Rodin Motorsport	DPN; 1; 6	DPN; 2; 3^{2}	DPN; 3 C	BHI; 1; 6	BHI; 2; 2^{1}	BHI; 3; 19	SNE; 1; 4	SNE; 2; 2^{7}	SNE; 3; 2	THR; 1; 4	THR; 2 Ret	THR; 3; 3	SILGP; 1 Ret	SILGP; 2 Ret	SILGP; 3; 5	ZAN; 1 Ret	ZAN; 2; 4^{10}	ZAN; 3; 3	KNO; 1; 5	KNO; 2; 9	KNO; 3; 5	DPGP; 1 Ret	DPGP; 2; 3	DPGP; 3; 10	DPGP; 4; 10	SILN; 1; 3	SILN; 2 C	SILN; 3; 4	BHGP; 1; 4	BHGP; 2; 6	BHGP; 3 Ret	BHGP; 4 DNS	5th	230

=== Complete GB3 Championship results ===
(key) (Races in bold indicate pole position) (Races in italics indicate fastest lap)

Year	Team	1	2	3	4	5	6	7	8	9	10	11	12	13	14	15	16	17	18	19	20	21	22	23	24	DC	Points
2023	Chris Dittmann Racing	OUL; 1	OUL; 2	OUL; 3	SIL1; 1	SIL1; 2	SIL1; 3	SPA; 1	SPA; 2	SPA; 3	SNE; 1	SNE; 2	SNE; 3	SIL2; 1	SIL2; 2	SIL2; 3	BRH; 1	BRH; 2	BRH; 3	ZAN; 1; 20	ZAN; 2 Ret	ZAN; 3; 22	DON; 1	DON; 2	DON; 3	27th	1
2025	Xcel Motorsport	SIL1; 1; 18	SIL1; 2; 21	SIL1; 3; 9^{9}	ZAN; 1; 15	ZAN; 2; 16	ZAN; 3; 10^{9}	SPA; 1 Ret	SPA; 2; 19	SPA; 3; 7^{9}	HUN; 1; 13	HUN; 2 Ret	HUN; 3; 14^{2}	SIL2; 1; 16	SIL2; 2; 14	SIL2; 3; 5	BRH; 1 NC	BRH; 2; 12	BRH; 3; 2	DON; 1; 11	DON; 2; 8	DON; 3; 4^{1}	MNZ; 1; 11	MNZ; 2; 7	MNZ; 3; 12^{3}	13th	193
