= Jarrod Waberski =

South African racing driver (born 2005)

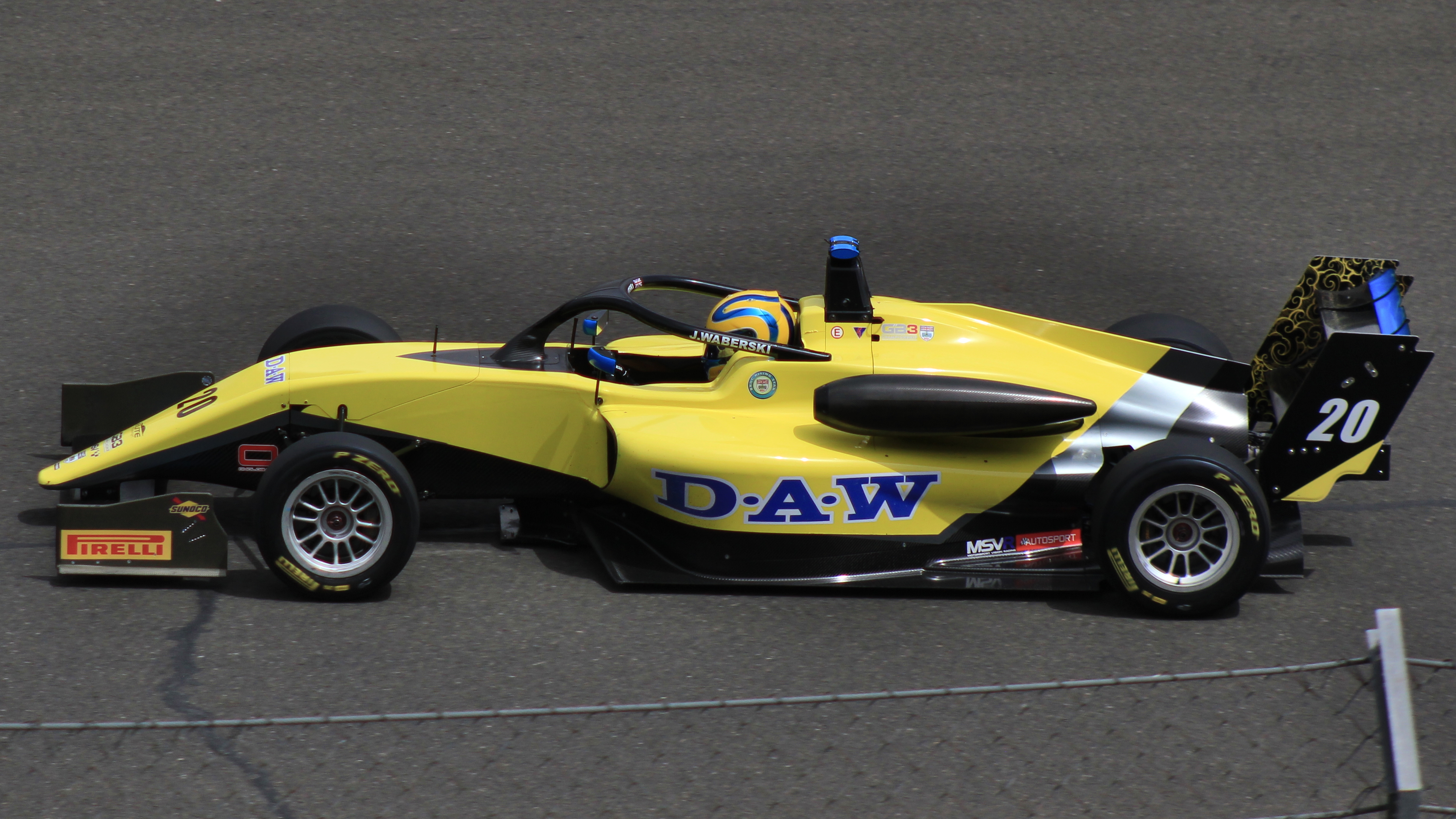
- Waberski at the Hungaroring in 2024
- Nationality: (South Africa) South African
- Born: 20 September 2005 (age 21) Gauteng, South Africa

GB3 Championship career
- Debut season: 2023
- Current team: Elite Motorsport
- Categorisation: FIA Silver
- Car number: 20
- Former teams: Fortec Motorsport
- Starts: 33 (34 entries)
- Wins: 0
- Podiums: 2
- Poles: 0
- Fastest laps: 0
- Best finish: 9th in 2023

Jarrod Waberski (born 20 September 2005) is a South African racing driver who last competed in the 2026 British GT Championship for Barwell Motorsport, and is the runner up of the 2022 GB4 Championship.

== Early career ==
=== Karting ===
Waberski is a third generation racing driver and the son of former racing driver Garth Waberski, who drove in series such as Formula Renault UK and British Formula 3, the elder Waberski also won the 2004 Can-Am South Africa Championship. The younger Waberski showed talent in the South African karting scene and won the 2013, 2017 and 2018 SA Regional Championship, he also won the 2018 South African Karting Championship as well. He competed in the 2018 WSK Open Cup in the OKJ category, where he came in 27th.

=== Junior formulae ===
Waberski made his single-seater debut in the 2020 South African Formula 1600 National Championship, where he competed in three races and claimed one podium, finishing the championship in seventh position with one podium to his name, he came runner-up the 2021 South African Formula 1600 National Championship, as he took his maiden single-seater win and amassed nine podiums in that years campaign.

=== GB4 Championship ===
Waberski was announced to compete in the inaugural season of the 2022 GB4 Championship with Kevin Mills Racing. He kicked off his campaign at Snetterton Circuit, where he would get his maiden podium in the series in only his second race. At the next round in Oulton Park, he would get two more podiums, with then one in his third race being his maiden win in the series. Waberski would go on to score three more victories in the championship, two of which came in the final round at Donington Park. These victories enabled Waberski to take second in the standings in an impressive rookie season in Europe.

=== GB3 Championship ===
==== 2023 ====
After his successful year in GB4, Waberski joined forces with Fortec Motorsport as he stepped up to join the 2023 GB3 Championship. Waberski had a strong opening round, with a best result of fifth in the reverse-grid race, where he gained ten extra points for achieving ten overtakes over the course of the race. He scored his first podium two rounds later at Spa-Francorchamps. This third-placed finish would turn out to be Waberski's best result of the season, as he finished ninth in the standings, a respectable result considering the strength of the grid over the course of the season.

==== 2024 ====
In early 2024, it was announced that Waberski would be returning to the championship for the 2024 season, this time joining Elite Motorsport. He stated that his "main goal" was "to win the championship". He started the season well, securing a podium in the first round at Oulton Park. Unfortunately for Waberski, this would also end up being his best result of the season, as he scored two further podiums over the course of the season at the Hungaroring and at Silverstone. However, Waberski had a very consistent season as he scored points in every race of the season. This consistency led him to sixth in the standings, finishing above Gerrard Xie, the driver he had been competing with over the 23 races that were held over the course of the year.

== Sportscar career ==
=== 2025 ===
After making a cameo in the 2023 GT World Challenge Europe Sprint Cup, Waberski fully switched to sportscar racing after the 2024 season and drove for Century Motorsport in the Silver category of the 2025 GT World Challenge Europe Endurance Cup with Mex Jansen and Will Moore, where they won the championship in the Silver class. Their campaign included a win in the second round at Monza.

=== 2026 ===
Apart of the SRO GT Academy class, where the winner will be granted a seat in the 2027 24 Hours of Spa, he competed in the Silver-Am class of the British GT Championship with Alex Martin for Barwell Motorsport. The duo took an overall win at the Spa-Francorchamps and finished fourth in the standings. Waberski also beat Charles Clark by two points to secure the SRO GT Academy title and thus earned a fully-funded drive in the 2027 24 Hours of Spa.

== Racing record ==
=== Racing career summary ===
Season	Series	Team	Races	Wins	Poles	F/Laps	Podiums	Points	Position
2020	South African Formula 1600 National Championship		3	0	0	0	1	9	7th
2021	South African Formula 1600 National Championship		12	1	0	0	9	76	**2nd**
2022	GB4 Championship	Kevin Mills Racing	24	4	0	1	14	496	**2nd**
2022	South African Formula 1600 National Championship		?	0	0	0	0	1	14th
2023	GB3 Championship	Fortec Motorsport	22	0	0	0	1	239	9th
2023	GT World Challenge Europe Sprint Cup	GSM AB1 GT3 Team	2	0	0	0	0	0	NC
2023	GT World Challenge Europe Sprint Cup - Silver	GSM AB1 GT3 Team	2	0	0	0	0	6.50	18th
2024	GB3 Championship	Elite Motorsport	23	0	0	0	3	286	6th
2025	GT World Challenge Europe Endurance Cup	Century Motorsport	5	0	0	0	0	6	23rd
2025	GT World Challenge Europe Endurance Cup - Silver	Century Motorsport	5	1	0	1	3	90	**1st**
2026	British GT Championship - GT3	Barwell Motorsport	8	1	0	0	1	125	4th
2026	GT World Challenge Europe Endurance Cup	GetSpeed Team Dubai							

^{*} Season still in progress.

=== Complete GB4 Championship results ===
(key) (Races in bold indicate pole position) (Races in italics indicate fastest lap)

Year	Entrant	1	2	3	4	5	6	7	8	9	10	11	12	13	14	15	16	17	18	19	20	21	22	23	24	DC	Points
2022	Kevin Mills Racing	SNE1; 1; 5	SNE1; 2; 3	SNE1; 3; 5^{3}	OUL; 1; 3	OUL; 2; 4	OUL; 3; 1^{2}	SIL1; 1; 7	SIL1; 2; 2	SIL1; 3 Ret	DON1; 1; 8	DON1; 2; 5	DON1; 3; 3^{3}	SNE2; 1; 2	SNE2; 2; 1	SNE2; 3; 4^{3}	SIL2; 1 Ret	SIL2; 2; 3	SIL2; 3; 3^{5}	BRH; 1; 3	BRH; 2; 2	BRH; 3; 4^{3}	DON2; 1; 3	DON2; 2; 1	DON2; 3; 1^{16}	2nd	496

=== Complete GB3 Championship results ===
(key) (Races in bold indicate pole position) (Races in italics indicate fastest lap)

Year	Team	1	2	3	4	5	6	7	8	9	10	11	12	13	14	15	16	17	18	19	20	21	22	23	24	DC	Points
2023	Fortec Motorsport	OUL; 1; 9	OUL; 2 DNS	OUL; 3; 5^{10}	SIL1; 1; 10	SIL1; 2; 5	SIL1; 3; 21	SPA; 1; 19	SPA; 2; 11	SPA; 3; 3^{9}	SNE; 1; 15	SNE; 2; 12	SNE; 3; 4	SIL2; 1; 22	SIL2; 2; 7	SIL2; 3 C	BRH; 1; 10	BRH; 2; 6	BRH; 3 Ret	ZAN; 1; 8	ZAN; 2; 24	ZAN; 3; 8^{9}	DON; 1; 7	DON; 2; 9	DON; 3; 7^{6}	9th	239
2024	Elite Motorsport	OUL; 1; 10	OUL; 2; 7	OUL; 3; 2^{1}	SIL1; 1; 7	SIL1; 2; 6	SIL1; 3 C	SPA; 1; 10	SPA; 2; 12	SPA; 3; 13	HUN; 1; 10	HUN; 2; 5	HUN; 3; 3	ZAN; 1; 10	ZAN; 2; 12	ZAN; 3; 13^{3}	SIL2; 1; 3	SIL2; 2; 4	SIL2; 3; 12	DON; 1; 9	DON; 2; 13	DON; 3; 12^{1}	BRH; 1; 11	BRH; 2; 5	BRH; 3; 4	6th	286

=== Complete GT World Challenge results ===
==== GT World Challenge Europe Sprint Cup ====
(key) (Races in bold indicate pole position) (Races in italics indicate fastest lap)

Year	Team	Car	Class	1	2	3	4	5	6	7	8	9	10	Pos.	Points
2023	GSM AB1 GT3 Team	Lamborghini Huracán GT3 Evo 2	Silver	BRH; 1	BRH; 2	MIS; 1	MIS; 2	HOC; 1	HOC; 2	VAL; 1; 34	VAL; 2; 30	ZAN; 1	ZAN; 2	18th	6.5

==== GT World Challenge Europe Endurance Cup ====
(key) (Races in bold indicate pole position) (Races in italics indicate fastest lap)

Year	Team	Car	Class	1	2	3	4	5	6	7	Pos.	Points
2025	Century Motorsport	BMW M4 GT3 Evo	Silver	LEC; 24	MNZ; 7	SPA; 6H; 30	SPA; 12H; 20	SPA; 24H; 23	NÜR; 19	BAR; 23	1st	90
2026	GetSpeed Team Dubai	Mercedes-AMG GT3 Evo	Bronze	LEC	MNZ	SPA; 6H; 23	SPA; 12H; 28	SPA; 24H; 47	NÜR	ALG	23rd*	11*

=== Complete British GT Championship results ===
(key) (Races in bold indicate pole position) (Races in italics indicate fastest lap)

Year	Team	Car	Class	1	2	3	4	5	6	7	8	DC	Points
2026	Barwell Motorsport	Lamborghini Huracán GT3 Evo 2	GT3	SIL; 1; 5	OUL; 1; 5	OUL; 2; 5	SPA; 1; 1	SNE; 1; 5	SNE; 2; 9	DON; 1; 5	BRH; 1; 4	4th	125

Sporting positions
Preceded by Andrew Howard; Tom Wood	British GT Championship; Silver-Am Champion; 2026; With: Alex Martin	Succeeded by Incumbent
