= Max Marzorati =

British racing driver (born 2000)

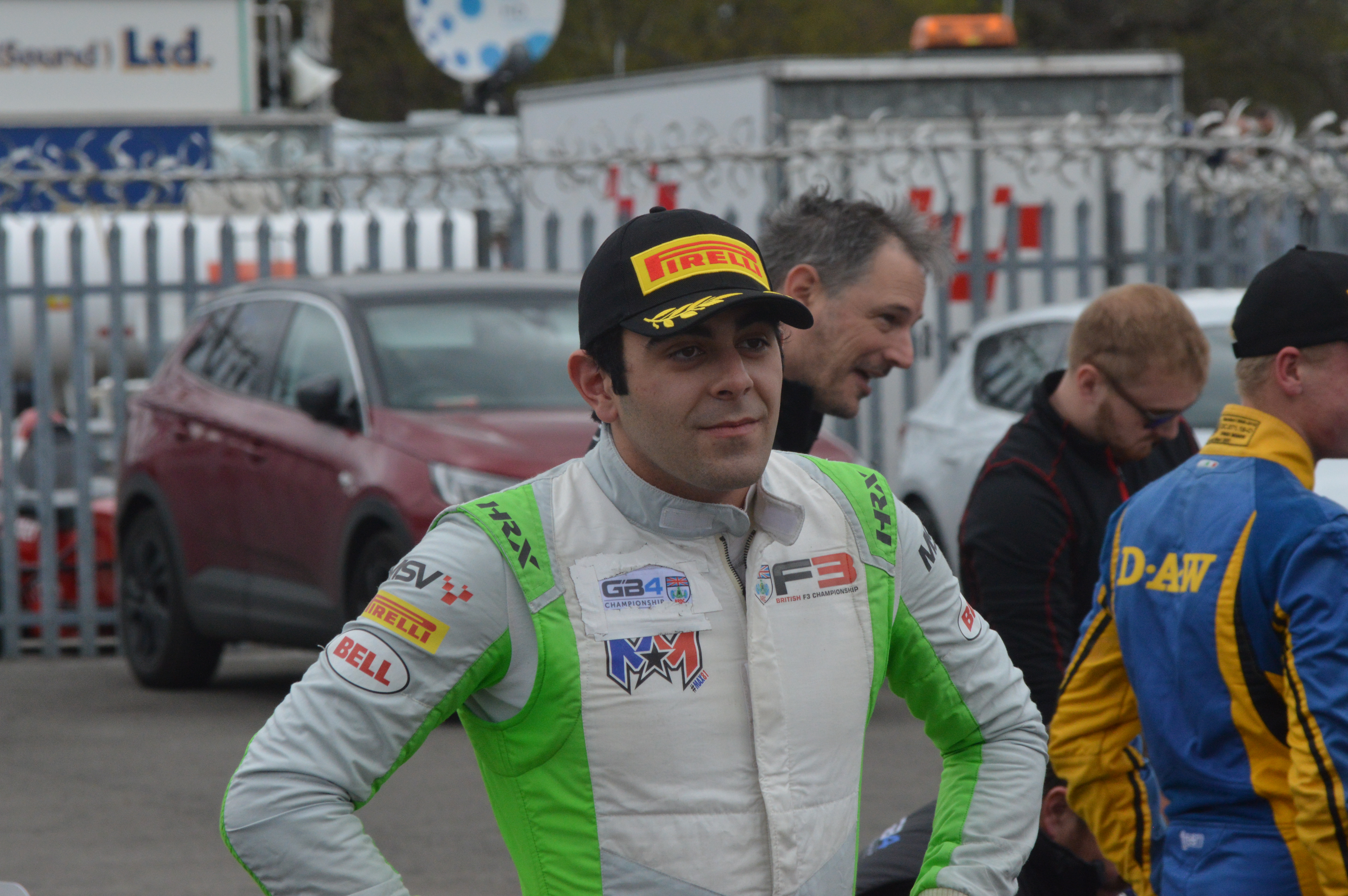
- Marzorati in 2022
- Nationality: (United Kingdom) British
- Born: 17 July 2000 (age 26) Harrow on the Hill, United Kingdom

GB3 Championship career
- Debut season: 2020
- Current team: Chris Dittmann Racing
- Car number: 81
- Former teams: JHR Developments
- Starts: 25 (25 entries)
- Wins: 0
- Podiums: 1
- Poles: 0
- Fastest laps: 0
- Best finish: 21st in 2021

Previous series
- 2018-2019 2017: Formula Ford 1600; Renault UK Clio Cup Junior

Max Marzorati (born 17 July 2000) is a British racing driver, currently competing in the NASCAR Whelen Euro Series for CAAL Racing.

== Early life ==
Not much is noted about Marzorati’s early life but he is known to have attended the John Lyon School.

== Career ==
=== Renault UK Clio Cup ===
Marzorati started his car racing career in the 2017 edition of the Renault UK Clio Cup. Driving for Team Pyro, he achieved three victories, winning his first ever car race and with 153 points he finished third in the junior class.

=== Lower formulae ===
In 2018, Marzorati made a switch to the single-seater scene, competing in various Formula Ford events, such as the Formula Ford Festival. He spent two years in the category, but would do selected rounds and events. In his first year he won the last chance race that got him into the festival final. In his second year, he had two podiums at the champion of Brands after leading the majority of both races. He then qualified on the front row at the festival in 2019 when contact with another driver dropped him back, he recovered to finish 11th in the final.

=== BRDC British Formula 3 Championship ===
In 2020, Marzorati progressed to the BRDC British Formula 3 Championship with JHR Developments for two rounds and then moved to Chris Dittmann Racing (CDR) for the final two rounds. with a best race finish of eighth in the first race of round three at Donnington.

The following year, Marzorati returned to the series, teaming up with Ayrton Simmons at CDR. He had a highest place of second (reverse grid) and had a puncture whilst fighting for the lead at the sixth round at Silverstone (reverse grid). He again only competed in half the rounds.

=== GB4 Championship ===
For 2022, Marzorati competed in the inaugural GB4 Championship. He was given the nickname "Mr Consistency" for his extremely consistent results over the course of the season, where he claimed ten podiums and started from pole position twice. He was a title contender and the main rival of the eventual championship winner Nikolas Taylor. After a disastrous final event at Donington for Marzorati, he finished third in the championship.

=== 2023 ===
Marzorati did not compete in any events during 2023. However, he was the lead development and test driver for the Formula Foundation car and championship. He also was a frequent commentator and presenter for the 2023 GB3 and GB4 season.

== Racing record ==
=== Career summary ===
Season	Series	Team	Races	Wins	Poles	F/Laps	Podiums	Points	Position
2017	Renault UK Clio Cup -Junior	Team Pyro	8	3	0	1	3	153	**3rd**
2018	Formula Ford 1600 - Champion of Brands	N/A	2	0	0	0	0	0	NC
2018	Formula Ford Festival - Heats/Semi	N/A	3	1	0	0	1	0	NC
2018	Formula Ford Festival	N/A	1	0	0	0	0	0	NC
2018	National Formula Ford Championship - Pro	N/A	3	0	0	0	0	18	33rd
2018	Northern Formula Ford 1600 Championship - Post 89	N/A	2	0	0	0	0	0	NC
2019	Formula Ford Festival	Team DOLAN	1	0	0	0	0	N/A	11th
2019	Formula Ford Festival - Pro class - Heats/Semi	Team DOLAN	2	0	0	0	0	N/A	NC
2019	Formula Ford 1600 - Champion of Brands	Team DOLAN	8	0	0	1	2	0	NC
2020	BRDC British Formula 3 Championship	JHR Developments	7	0	0	0	0	55	21st
2020	BRDC British Formula 3 Championship	Chris Dittmann Racing	6	0	0	0	0	55	21st
2021	GB3 Championship	Chris Dittmann Racing	12	0	0	0	1	78	20th
2022	GB4 Championship	Hillspeed	24	0	2	2	10	482	**3rd**
2024	NASCAR Whelen Euro Series - EuroNASCAR PRO	Double V Racing	4	0	0	0	0	78	28th
2025	NASCAR Euro Series - PRO	Marko Stipp Motorsport	2	0	0	0	0	122	23rd
2025	NASCAR Euro Series - PRO	CAAL Racing	4	0	0	0	0	122	23rd

* Season still in progress.

=== Complete BRDC British Formula 3 Championship results ===
(key) (Races in bold indicate pole position) (Races in italics indicate fastest lap)

Year	Team	1	2	3	4	5	6	7	8	9	10	11	12	13	14	15	16	17	18	19	20	21	22	23	24	Pos	Points
2020	Chris Dittmann Racing	OUL; 1	OUL; 2	OUL; 3	OUL; 4	DON1; 1; 17	DON1; 2; 16	DON1; 3; 16	BRH; 1	BRH; 2	BRH; 3	BRH; 4	DON2; 1	DON2; 2	DON2; 3	SNE; 1; 16	SNE; 2; 15^{1}	SNE; 3; 16	SNE; 4; 17	DON3; 1; 8	DON3; 2; 15	DON3; 3; 14	SIL; 1; 17	SIL; 2; 11	SIL; 3 Ret	21st	55
2021	Chris Dittmann Racing	BRH; 1; 14	BRH; 2; 13	BRH; 3 Ret	SIL1; 1; 14	SIL1; 2; 13	SIL1; 3 Ret	DON1; 1; 12	DON1; 2; 14	DON1; 3; 2	SPA; 1; 16	SPA; 2; 14	SPA; 3; 13	SNE; 1	SNE; 2	SNE; 3	SIL2; 1	SIL2; 2	SIL2; 3	OUL; 1	OUL; 2	OUL; 3	DON2; 1	DON2; 2	DON2; 3	20th	78

* Season still in progress.

=== Complete GB4 Championship results ===
(key) (Races in bold indicate pole position) (Races in italics indicate fastest lap)

Year	Entrant	1	2	3	4	5	6	7	8	9	10	11	12	13	14	15	16	17	18	19	20	21	22	23	24	DC	Points
2022	Hillspeed	SNE1; 1; 4	SNE1; 2; 4	SNE1; 3; 2^{3}	OUL; 1; 2	OUL; 2; 6	OUL; 3; 3^{4}	SIL1; 1; 3	SIL1; 2; 3	SIL1; 3; 6^{3}	DON1; 1; 2	DON1; 2; 4	DON1; 3; 4^{6}	SNE2; 1; 4	SNE2; 2; 2	SNE2; 3; 2^{4}	**SIL2**; **1**; 9	**SIL2**; **2**; 2	SIL2; 3; 2^{8}	BRA; 1; 4	BRA; 2; 6	BRA; 3; 6	DON2; 1; 7	DON2; 2; 6	DON2; 3; 8	3rd	482
