= 2023 GB3 Championship =

Motor racing championship

The 2023 GB3 Championship was a motor racing championship for open wheel, formula racing cars held across Europe. The 2023 season was the eighth organised by the British Racing Drivers' Club in the United Kingdom, and the third season under the GB3 moniker after rebranding from the BRDC British Formula 3 Championship in mid-2021. The championship featured a mix of professional motor racing teams and privately funded drivers. The season was run over eight triple-header rounds and started on 8 April at Oulton Park.

Rodin Carlin driver Callum Voisin won the Drivers' Championship ahead of Alex Dunne at the final race of the season. JHR Developments, the team of third-placed driver Joseph Loake, won the Teams' Championship.

Loake was named as the winner of the Aston Martin Autosport BRDC Young Driver of the Year Award in December, and will receive a test drive with the Aston Martin F1 team, £200,000, plus full membership of the BRDC.

== Teams and drivers ==
All teams were British-registered.

| Team | No. | Driver | Rounds |
|---|---|---|---|
| Arden VRD | 2 | (Canada) Nico Christodoulou | All |
| Arden VRD | 3 | (United States) Noah Ping | All |
| Arden VRD | 4 | (United Kingdom) James Hedley | All |
| JHR Developments | 5 | (United Kingdom) Matthew Rees | All |
| JHR Developments | 77 | (United States) David Morales | All |
| JHR Developments | 84 | (United Kingdom) Joseph Loake | All |
| Douglas Motorsport | 7 | (Poland) Tymek Kucharczyk | All |
| Douglas Motorsport | 11 | (Brazil) Lucas Staico | 1–7 |
| Douglas Motorsport | 32 | (United States) Shawn Rashid | 1–7 |
| Chris Dittmann Racing | 9 | (United Kingdom) Zak Taylor | 1–7 |
| Chris Dittmann Racing | 18 | (France) Arthur Rogeon | All |
| Chris Dittmann Racing | 78 | (United Kingdom) Jack Sherwood | 7 |
| Elite Motorsport | 14 | (Australia) Patrick Heuzenroeder | 7–8 |
| Elite Motorsport | 15 | (Japan) Ayato Iwasaki | 1–6 |
| Elite Motorsport | 16 | (United Kingdom) McKenzy Cresswell | All |
| Elite Motorsport | 17 | (United Kingdom) Oliver Stewart | All |
| Fortec Motorsports | 20 | (South Africa) Jarrod Waberski | All |
| Fortec Motorsports | 41 | (United Kingdom) Edward Pearson | All |
| Fortec Motorsports | 42 | (United States) Max Esterson | All |
| Hitech Pulse-Eight | 21 | (Japan) Souta Arao | All |
| Hitech Pulse-Eight | 22 | (Republic of Ireland) Alex Dunne | All |
| Hitech Pulse-Eight | 23 | (South Korea) Michael Shin | 1–4, 6–8 |
| Rodin Carlin | 27 | (United Kingdom) John Bennett | All |
| Rodin Carlin | 35 | (United Kingdom) Callum Voisin | All |
| Rodin Carlin | 43 | (Australia) Costa Toparis | All |
| Hillspeed | 39 | (Hong Kong) Gerrard Xie (Note: Xie is a Chinese driver who competed under a Hong Kong licence.) | All |
| Hillspeed | 99 | (Turkey) Daniel Mavlyutov | All |

== Race calendar and results ==
The provisional calendar was announced on 15 October 2022. For the first time in series history, two events were held outside the United Kingdom. This also meant that the GB3 Championship became an FIA-certified international series.

| Round | | Circuit | Date | Supporting | Map of circuit locations |
|---|---|---|---|---|---|
| 1 | R1 | (United Kingdom) Oulton Park (International Circuit, Cheshire) | 8 April | British GT Championship | 2023 GB3 Championship is located in West Europe |
| 1 | R2 | (United Kingdom) Oulton Park (International Circuit, Cheshire) | 10 April | British GT Championship | 2023 GB3 Championship is located in West Europe |
| 1 | R3 | (United Kingdom) Oulton Park (International Circuit, Cheshire) | 10 April | British GT Championship | 2023 GB3 Championship is located in West Europe |
| 2 | R4 | (United Kingdom) Silverstone Circuit (Grand Prix Circuit, Northamptonshire) | 6 May | British GT Championship | 2023 GB3 Championship is located in West Europe |
| 2 | R5 | (United Kingdom) Silverstone Circuit (Grand Prix Circuit, Northamptonshire) | 7 May | British GT Championship | 2023 GB3 Championship is located in West Europe |
| 2 | R6 | (United Kingdom) Silverstone Circuit (Grand Prix Circuit, Northamptonshire) | 7 May | British GT Championship | 2023 GB3 Championship is located in West Europe |
| 3 | R7 | Circuit de Spa-Francorchamps (Spa, Belgium) | 3 June | Spa Euro Race: Supercar Challenge; Prototype Challenge | 2023 GB3 Championship is located in West Europe |
| 3 | R8 | Circuit de Spa-Francorchamps (Spa, Belgium) | 3 June | Spa Euro Race: Supercar Challenge; Prototype Challenge | 2023 GB3 Championship is located in West Europe |
| 3 | R9 | Circuit de Spa-Francorchamps (Spa, Belgium) | 4 June | Spa Euro Race: Supercar Challenge; Prototype Challenge | 2023 GB3 Championship is located in West Europe |
| 4 | R10 | (United Kingdom) Snetterton Circuit (300 Circuit, Norfolk) | 17 June | British GT Championship | 2023 GB3 Championship is located in West Europe |
| 4 | R11 | (United Kingdom) Snetterton Circuit (300 Circuit, Norfolk) | 18 June | British GT Championship | 2023 GB3 Championship is located in West Europe |
| 4 | R12 | (United Kingdom) Snetterton Circuit (300 Circuit, Norfolk) | 18 June | British GT Championship | 2023 GB3 Championship is located in West Europe |
| 5 | R13 | (United Kingdom) Silverstone Circuit (Grand Prix Circuit, Northamptonshire) | 29 July | Main event | 2023 GB3 Championship is located in West Europe |
| 5 | R14 | (United Kingdom) Silverstone Circuit (Grand Prix Circuit, Northamptonshire) | 30 July | Main event | 2023 GB3 Championship is located in West Europe |
| 5 | R15 | (United Kingdom) Silverstone Circuit (Grand Prix Circuit, Northamptonshire) | 30 July | Main event | 2023 GB3 Championship is located in West Europe |
| 6 | R16 | (United Kingdom) Brands Hatch (Grand Prix Circuit, Kent) | 9 September | British GT Championship | 2023 GB3 Championship is located in West Europe |
| 6 | R17 | (United Kingdom) Brands Hatch (Grand Prix Circuit, Kent) | 10 September | British GT Championship | 2023 GB3 Championship is located in West Europe |
| 6 | R18 | (United Kingdom) Brands Hatch (Grand Prix Circuit, Kent) | 10 September | British GT Championship | 2023 GB3 Championship is located in West Europe |
| 7 | R19 | Circuit Zandvoort (Zandvoort, Netherlands) | 14 October | GT World Challenge Europe | 2023 GB3 Championship is located in West Europe |
| 7 | R20 | Circuit Zandvoort (Zandvoort, Netherlands) | 14 October | GT World Challenge Europe | 2023 GB3 Championship is located in West Europe |
| 7 | R21 | Circuit Zandvoort (Zandvoort, Netherlands) | 15 October | GT World Challenge Europe | 2023 GB3 Championship is located in West Europe |
| 8 | R22 | (United Kingdom) Donington Park (Grand Prix Circuit, Leicestershire) | 21 October | British GT Championship | 2023 GB3 Championship is located in West Europe |
| 8 | R23 | (United Kingdom) Donington Park (Grand Prix Circuit, Leicestershire) | 22 October | British GT Championship | 2023 GB3 Championship is located in West Europe |
| 8 | R24 | (United Kingdom) Donington Park (Grand Prix Circuit, Leicestershire) | 22 October | British GT Championship | 2023 GB3 Championship is located in West Europe |

== Race results ==
| Round | | Circuit | Pole position | Fastest lap | Winning driver | Winning team |
|---|---|---|---|---|---|---|
| 1 | R1 | (United Kingdom) Oulton Park (International Circuit, Cheshire) | (United Kingdom) Joseph Loake | (United Kingdom) Joseph Loake | (United Kingdom) Joseph Loake | JHR Developments |
| 1 | R2 | (United Kingdom) Oulton Park (International Circuit, Cheshire) | (United Kingdom) Joseph Loake | (United Kingdom) Callum Voisin | (United Kingdom) James Hedley | Arden VRD |
| 1 | R3 | (United Kingdom) Oulton Park (International Circuit, Cheshire) | | (United Kingdom) Oliver Stewart | (Turkey) Daniel Mavlyutov | Hillspeed |
| 2 | R4 | (United Kingdom) Silverstone Circuit (Grand Prix Circuit, Northamptonshire) | (United Kingdom) John Bennett (Note: Tymek Kucharczyk originally qualified on pole position for both race 1 and race 2 in the qualifying session, but was later disqualified due to a technical infringement. Bennett inherited pole position for both races.) | (United Kingdom) Joseph Loake | (United Kingdom) Joseph Loake (Note: John Bennett finished first on-track, but was given a 1-position penalty for overtaking off-track. Loake inherited the win.) | JHR Developments |
| 2 | R5 | (United Kingdom) Silverstone Circuit (Grand Prix Circuit, Northamptonshire) | (United Kingdom) John Bennett | (United Kingdom) Matthew Rees | (United Kingdom) Joseph Loake (Note: Matthew Rees crossed the line first, but was handed a ten-second time penalty for a jump start. John Bennett initially inherited the race win, before he was also penalized for a collision with Alex Dunne, handing Loake the win.) | JHR Developments |
| 2 | R6 | (United Kingdom) Silverstone Circuit (Grand Prix Circuit, Northamptonshire) | | (Poland) Tymek Kucharczyk | (United States) Noah Ping | Arden VRD |
| 3 | R7 | Circuit de Spa-Francorchamps (Spa, Belgium) | (United Kingdom) Callum Voisin | (Republic of Ireland) Alex Dunne | (Republic of Ireland) Alex Dunne | Hitech Pulse-Eight |
| 3 | R8 | Circuit de Spa-Francorchamps (Spa, Belgium) | (United Kingdom) Callum Voisin | (Republic of Ireland) Alex Dunne | (Republic of Ireland) Alex Dunne | Hitech Pulse-Eight |
| 3 | R9 | Circuit de Spa-Francorchamps (Spa, Belgium) | | (United States) Max Esterson | (United Kingdom) Oliver Stewart | Elite Motorsport |
| 4 | R10 | (United Kingdom) Snetterton Circuit (300 Circuit, Norfolk) | (United Kingdom) Matthew Rees | (Republic of Ireland) Alex Dunne | (United Kingdom) James Hedley | Arden VRD |
| 4 | R11 | (United Kingdom) Snetterton Circuit (300 Circuit, Norfolk) | (United Kingdom) Callum Voisin | (Republic of Ireland) Alex Dunne | (United States) Noah Ping | Arden VRD |
| 4 | R12 | (United Kingdom) Snetterton Circuit (300 Circuit, Norfolk) | | (Japan) Souta Arao | (Turkey) Daniel Mavlyutov | Hillspeed |
| 5 | R13 | (United Kingdom) Silverstone Circuit (Grand Prix Circuit, Northamptonshire) | (United Kingdom) Matthew Rees | (United Kingdom) Matthew Rees | (United Kingdom) Matthew Rees | JHR Developments |
| 5 | R14 | (United Kingdom) Silverstone Circuit (Grand Prix Circuit, Northamptonshire) | (United Kingdom) Matthew Rees | (United Kingdom) McKenzy Cresswell | (United Kingdom) McKenzy Cresswell | Elite Motorsport |
| 5 | R15 | (United Kingdom) Silverstone Circuit (Grand Prix Circuit, Northamptonshire) | | race cancelled due to adverse weather conditions | | |
| 6 | R16 | (United Kingdom) Brands Hatch (Grand Prix Circuit, Kent) | (United Kingdom) Joseph Loake | (United Kingdom) Joseph Loake | (United Kingdom) Joseph Loake | JHR Developments |
| 6 | R17 | (United Kingdom) Brands Hatch (Grand Prix Circuit, Kent) | (United Kingdom) Callum Voisin | (United Kingdom) McKenzy Cresswell | (United Kingdom) Callum Voisin | Rodin Carlin |
| 6 | R18 | (United Kingdom) Brands Hatch (Grand Prix Circuit, Kent) | | (Canada) Nico Christodoulou | (Turkey) Daniel Mavlyutov | Hillspeed |
| 7 | R19 | Circuit Zandvoort (Zandvoort, Netherlands) | (Republic of Ireland) Alex Dunne | (Republic of Ireland) Alex Dunne | (Republic of Ireland) Alex Dunne | Hitech Pulse-Eight |
| 7 | R20 | Circuit Zandvoort (Zandvoort, Netherlands) | (United Kingdom) McKenzy Cresswell | (Republic of Ireland) Alex Dunne | (Republic of Ireland) Alex Dunne | Hitech Pulse-Eight |
| 7 | R21 | Circuit Zandvoort (Zandvoort, Netherlands) | | (Poland) Tymek Kucharczyk | (Turkey) Daniel Mavlyutov | Hillspeed |
| 8 | R22 | (United Kingdom) Donington Park (Grand Prix Circuit, Leicestershire) | (United Kingdom) Callum Voisin | (Republic of Ireland) Alex Dunne | (United Kingdom) Callum Voisin | Rodin Carlin |
| 8 | R23 | (United Kingdom) Donington Park (Grand Prix Circuit, Leicestershire) | (United Kingdom) Callum Voisin | (Republic of Ireland) Alex Dunne | (Republic of Ireland) Alex Dunne | Hitech Pulse-Eight |
| 8 | R24 | (United Kingdom) Donington Park (Grand Prix Circuit, Leicestershire) | | (Hong Kong) Gerrard Xie | (Hong Kong) Gerrard Xie | Hillspeed |

== Season report ==
=== First half ===
The 2023 GB3 Championship opened up at Oulton Park with JHR's Joseph Loake taking a pair of pole positions. The first race saw him retain his lead and hold off teammate Matthew Rees. The race was red-flagged and ended two laps before the end after a safety car restart ended in a multi-car crash, handing JHR a 1-2 ahead of Carlin's Callum Voisin. The second race began with a rain shower that delayed proceedings, but Arden's James Hedley was on the move when it started, climbing from fourth to second and pressuring Loake to take the lead. Voisin was also able to move past Loake into second, but was unable to catch up to Hedley. Hillspeed's Daniel Mavlyutov was on reverse-grid pole position for the final race. The race never really got going after a crash right at the start, with only three minutes of running under green flag conditions. Mavlyutov was therefore largely unchallenged by Elite's Ayato Iwasaki and Fortec's Edward Pearson behind him. Loake finished twelfth to take a five-point championship lead ahead of Hedley.

Up next was the season's first stop at Silverstone. Douglas Motorsport's Tymek Kucharczyk took both pole positions but was disqualified, allowing Carlin's John Bennett to inherit them. In a very wet first race, Loake took the lead at the start, but Bennett repassed him and led until the end. This move was later judged to have happened off track, so Bennett was handed a one-place penalty, gifting the win to Loake, with Rees third. The second race was also decided in the steward's office: Rees came first but had jumped the start, while second-placed man Bennett was penalized for a collision with Hitech's Alex Dunne. This saw Loake inherit another win, ahead of Elite's McKenzy Cresswell and Voisin. Race three saw Arden's Noah Ping take the lead from Iwasaki at the start. He won the race as behind him Voisin and Elite's Oliver Stewart both earned track limit penalties, allowing Arden's Nico Christodoulou and CDR's Arthur Rogeon on the podium. Loake's two off-track wins saw him extend his championship lead to 31 points, with Voisin now second.

The first race abroad followed a month later at Spa with Voisin claiming double pole positions. At the start of race one, Dunne in second fought off Cresswell until the latter spun. At the next restart, Dunne was free to attack Voisin, take the lead and control the race to take his maiden win, while Kucharczyk came third. The same protagonists fought for the second race, with Cresswell initially claiming the lead. Once again though Dunne was the fastest and took the lead, with him and Voisin both moving back past Cresswell as the top three were in a league of their own. Stewart had pole position for the reverse-grid race three. He initially lost the lead to Mavlyutov after a slow start, but the latter ran wide to allow Stewart back through. Loake took second and pressured Stewart all race, but was unable to steal the win, while Fortec's Jarrod Waberski completed the podium. Voisin's pair of second places saw him close the gap to Loake just two points after the latter struggled for pace all weekend.

The first half of the season ended back in Britain at Snetterton, where Rees and Voisin shared pole positions. Hedley started the first race in fourth, but was already leading after turn one. Rees tried all race to get back past, but could not pressure Hedley into a mistake. Voisin and Dunne had a similar battle over third, with the Brit coming out ahead. He was able to hold on to his lead at the start of race three, before colliding with Kucharczyk and retiring. This saw the latter drop to third, allowing Ping and Dunne through. Kucharczyk was eventually disqualified for his collision with Voisin, promoting Hedley onto the podium. The reversed grid race three saw Mavlyutov start in front. The front of the field was rather calm, with the title contenders battling further down the order. This allowed Mavlyutov to manage his lead to win ahead of Rogeon and Douglas Motorsport's Lucas Staico. Voisin's race two retirement and another weekend away from the front of the field for Loake allowed Dunne to take a six-point championship lead.

=== Second half ===
Round five saw the series return to Silverstone, and Rees took both pole positions. He clearly was the fastest man in race one, pulling away from his pole position and building a gap to the field. He took an unchallenged maiden win four seconds ahead of Cresswell, who had Voisin in his mirrors all race, but the latter did not attempt a move for second place. Cresswell took the lead of the second race on the first lap into Copse. He then had to manage a safety car restart, but did so untroubled to lead away to become the second maiden winner of the weekend. Rees had to be content with second, while Kucharczyk completed the podium. Rain then struck the circuit ahead of the third race. The race was started behind the safety car, but red flags for the conditions were waved after three laps. The race was then abandoned and declared cancelled. Voisin was the only one of the three main championship challengers to appear on the podium all weekend. His reward was a narrow one-point lead over Dunne heading into the summer break.

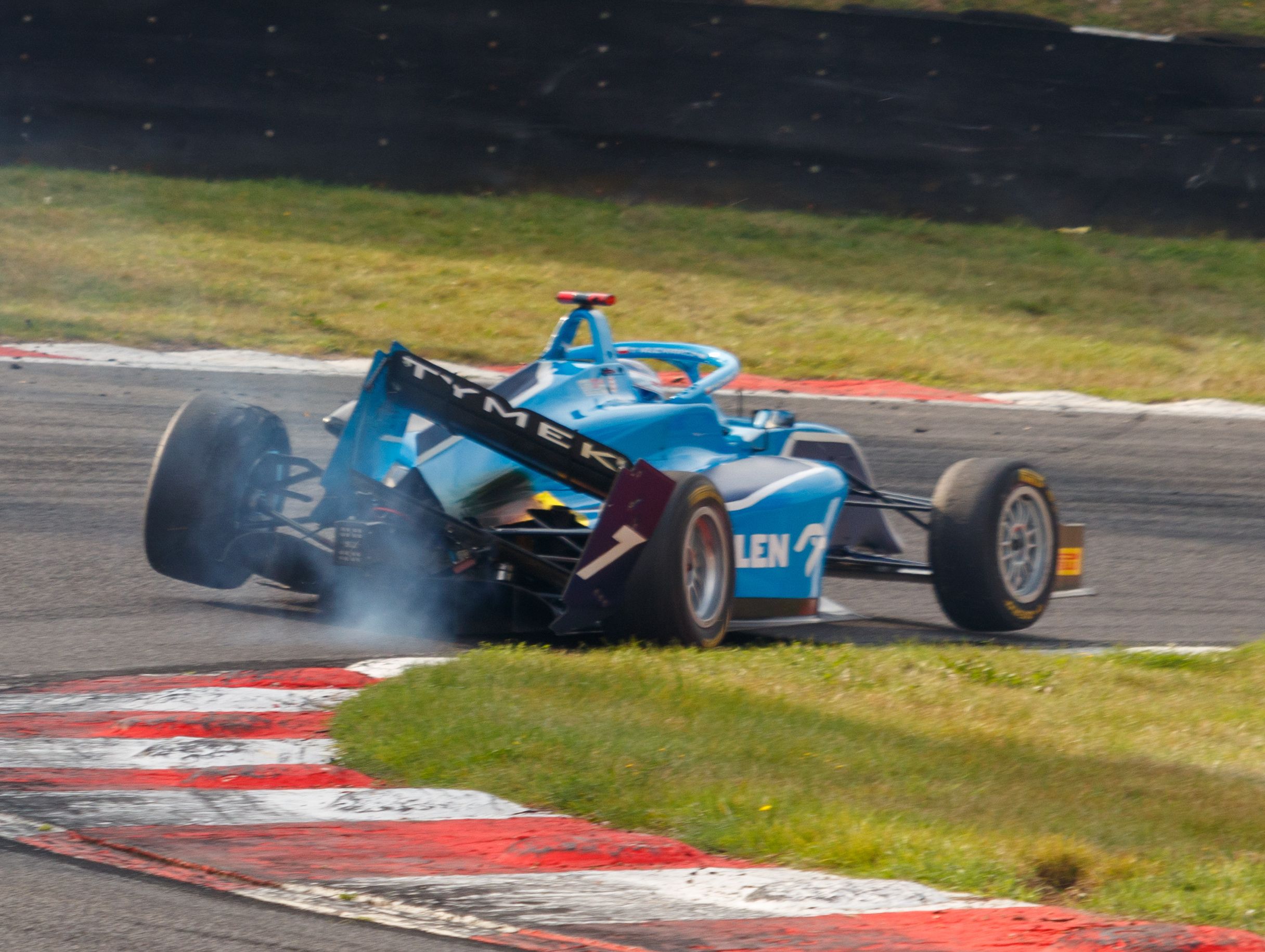
Tymek Kucharczyk's (Douglas Motorsport) and Jarrod Waberski's (Fortec Motorsports) cars damaged after a shunt during the opening lap of the third race at Brands Hatch.

Brands Hatch came next, with Loake and Voisin on pole position for the two races. The pair began the first race one and two, while championship contender Dunne was spun around by Rees and was forced to retire. Loake led Voisin through two safety car periods and subsequent restarts to win, while Cresswell came home third. The top two were reversed for the start of race two, and Loake challenged Voisin for the lead for half a lap before the latter came out on top. He managed his gap from then on to take his first win of the season, while Cresswell came third again to take his fourth podium in a row. Ping's reverse grid pole position for race three was handed to Mavlyutov after a penalty for the former. The race began with multiple crashes down the order that took out six cars and involved title challenger Loake, who had to pit. Mavlyutov led Christodoulou and Staico home to win. Voisin's win together with Dunne's retirement saw his championship advantage grow to 14 points, with Loake second and Dunne a further 27 points adrift.

The penultimate round of the season saw the championship's debut at Zandvoort and Dunne and Cresswell on pole position. The Irishman converted his pole position into the lead in race one. He dominated the race to finish six seconds clear of Cresswell, with Loake in third closing up to Voisin in the standings. In race two, it was Dunne who started second, but he made quick work of Cresswell to again take the lead. He led until the end to make it two wins out of two and move within six points of Voisin, while this time Christodoulou completed the podium. The reversed-grid third race was once again won by Mavlyutov after Elite's polesitter, debutant Patrick Heuzenroeder, crashed into turn three. The race had almost no running under green flag conditions and also ended under safety car after extensive damage to the barriers. Dunne's double win lifted him right back into championship contention, with the top three separated by only 17 points going into the final weekend.

The final weekend of the championship, dubbed the "Donington Decider", saw Voisin stake his claim to the title early on with a double pole position. The first race was held in damp conditions, with Voisin leading lights-to-flag ahead of Rees and Dunne to extend his standings advantage to 28 points. The race was disrupted by two safety car periods, one of them caused by Cresswell, who lost his mathematical chance for the title. This left three drivers in contention, and this number was reduced to only two when Dunne passed Voisin in race two. He won, with Fortec's Max Esterson third, to prolong the fight for the title to the final race. Loake came tenth and eighth in these two races and dropped out of contention. The final race was won by Hillspeed's Gerrard Xie, who came from third on the grid, in front of Pearson and Heuzenroeder. While Dunne finished ninth, three places ahead of Voisin, and also took one more point for overtaking during the race, he could not turn around the 22-point deficit and so Voisin won the championship.

Voisin only won two races, while Dunne and Loake won five races each, but was on the podium eleven times through the season, a feat that Dunne and Loake only managed seven and eight times respectively. All three title contenders had phases where they looked the fastest, with Loake starting the championship extremely strong and Dunne shining in the rounds abroad, but Voisin was close to the top throughout the year and never looked completely out of touch even when he lacked the pace. Loake and Dunne offered up a good fight that went down to the wire and offered good advertising for the championship, which had its strongest year yet, with a regular 25-car grid that only dropped lower than that on two occasions.

== Championship standings ==
Scoring system

Points were awarded to the top 20 classified finishers in races one and two, with the third race awarding points to only the top 15. Race three, which had its grid formed by reversing the qualifying order, awarded extra points for positions gained from the drivers' respective starting positions.

| Races | Position, points per race | | | | | | | | | | | | | | | | | | | |
| Races | 1st | 2nd | 3rd | 4th | 5th | 6th | 7th | 8th | 9th | 10th | 11th | 12th | 13th | 14th | 15th | 16th | 17th | 18th | 19th | 20th |
|---|---|---|---|---|---|---|---|---|---|---|---|---|---|---|---|---|---|---|---|---|
| Races 1 & 2 | 35 | 29 | 24 | 21 | 19 | 17 | 15 | 13 | 12 | 11 | 10 | 9 | 8 | 7 | 6 | 5 | 4 | 3 | 2 | 1 |
| Race 3 | 20 | 17 | 15 | 13 | 11 | 10 | 9 | 8 | 7 | 6 | 5 | 4 | 3 | 2 | 1 | | | | | |

Notes

- ^{1} ^{2} ^{3} refers to positions gained and thus extra points earned during race three.

=== Drivers' championship ===
| Pos | Driver | OUL (United Kingdom) | | | SIL1 (United Kingdom) | | | SPA (Belgium) | | | SNE (United Kingdom) | | | SIL2 (United Kingdom) | | | BRH (United Kingdom) | | | ZAN (Netherlands) | | | DON (United Kingdom) | | | Pts |
| Pos | Driver | R1 | R2 | R3 | R4 | R5 | R6 | R7 | R8 | R9 | R10 | R11 | R12 | R13 | R14 | R15 | R16 | R17 | R18 | R19 | R20 | R21 | R22 | R23 | R24 | Pts |
|---|---|---|---|---|---|---|---|---|---|---|---|---|---|---|---|---|---|---|---|---|---|---|---|---|---|---|
| 1 | (United Kingdom) Callum Voisin | 3 | 2 | Ret | 6 | 3 | 4^{8} | **2** | **2** | 10^{15} | 3 | **Ret** | 11^{12} | 3 | 5 | C | 2 | **1** | 14^{9} | 7 | 6 | 5^{10} | **1** | **2** | 12^{10} | 484 |
| 2 | (Republic of Ireland) Alex Dunne | 6 | 13 | 10^{9} | 4 | Ret | 6^{12} | 1 | 1 | 6^{18} | 4 | 2 | 12^{9} | 5 | 6 | C | Ret | 4 | 11^{8} | **1** | 1 | 16^{8} | 3 | 1 | 9^{11} | 466 |
| 3 | (United Kingdom) Joseph Loake | **1** | **3** | 12^{13} | 1 | 1 | 20 | 9 | 10 | 2^{10} | 6 | 22 | 10^{8} | 6 | 4 | C | **1** | 2 | 15^{9} | 3 | 5 | 13^{8} | 10 | 8 | Ret | 417 |
| 4 | (United Kingdom) McKenzy Cresswell | 20 | 18 | Ret | 5 | 2 | 5^{8} | 7 | 3 | 11^{12} | 9 | 5 | Ret | 2 | 1 | C | 3 | 3 | 16^{6} | 2 | **2** | 11^{12} | Ret | 5 | 6^{10} | 390 |
| 5 | (United Kingdom) Matthew Rees | 2 | 11 | 14^{10} | 3 | 7 | 23 | Ret | 9 | Ret | **2** | 4 | 18^{6} | **1** | **2** | C | 6 | 5 | 12^{8} | 6 | 7 | 14^{5} | 2 | 4 | 13^{8} | 370 |
| 6 | (United Kingdom) James Hedley | 4 | 1 | 11^{10} | 9 | 20 | 10^{4} | 8 | 6 | 4^{6} | 1 | 3 | 13^{6} | 11 | 11 | C | 4 | 8 | 13^{8} | Ret | 4 | Ret | 4 | 6 | 11^{7} | 347 |
| 7 | (Poland) Tymek Kucharczyk | 5 | 8 | 13^{7} | 14 | 9 | 8^{15} | 3 | 5 | 7^{15} | 5 | DSQ | Ret | 4 | 3 | C | 5 | 7 | Ret | 12 | 10 | 18 | 9 | 7 | Ret | 296 |
| 8 | (Canada) Nico Christodoulou | 11 | 10 | 18 | Ret | 15 | 2^{7} | 12 | 8 | 16^{3} | Ret | 9 | 8^{9} | 7 | 8 | C | 13 | 13 | 2^{5} | 4 | 3 | 19^{3} | 8 | 12 | 4^{7} | 261 |
| 9 | (South Africa) Jarrod Waberski | 9 | DNS | 5^{10} | 10 | 5 | 21 | 19 | 11 | 3^{6} | 15 | 12 | 4 | 22 | 7 | C | 10 | 6 | Ret | 8 | 24 | 8^{9} | 7 | 9 | 7^{6} | 239 |
| 10 | (United Kingdom) John Bennett | 19 | 9 | Ret | **2** | **4** | 11^{8} | 15 | 12 | 9^{5} | 10 | 11 | 20 | 18 | 14 | C | 7 | 16 | 10^{8} | 10 | 14 | 7^{5} | 11 | 15 | 18 | 217 |
| 11 | (United States) Max Esterson | 7 | 4 | Ret | 13 | 8 | 22 | 6 | Ret | 21 | 20 | 16 | 16^{9} | 10 | 9 | C | 11 | 11 | Ret | 13 | 13 | 9^{2} | 6 | 3 | 8^{9} | 215 |
| 12 | (United States) Noah Ping | 12 | Ret | 7 | 12 | 12 | 1^{3} | Ret | 21 | 19 | 7 | 1 | 14^{6} | 9 | 10 | C | 16 | 21 | 5^{1} | 16 | 12 | 2^{4} | 19 | 11 | 16 | 204 |
| 13 | (United States) David Morales | 8 | Ret | 9^{7} | 11 | Ret | Ret | 4 | 14 | 15^{6} | 14 | 13 | 21 | 14 | 22 | C | Ret | 10 | 7^{3} | 14 | 11 | 4^{5} | 12 | 10 | 10 | 178 |
| 14 | (United Kingdom) Zak Taylor | 15 | 12 | 17 | 7 | Ret | 13 | 20† | 20 | Ret | 11 | 7 | 9^{4} | 8 | 12 | C | 9 | 9 | 8^{9} | 11 | 23 | 10^{3} | | | | 153 |
| 15 | (Australia) Costa Toparis | 22 | 7 | 6^{8} | 8 | 6 | 14^{3} | 10 | 13 | 12 | 21 | 6 | 15^{1} | 20 | 15 | C | 17 | 12 | 17 | 17 | 15 | 20 | 15 | 16 | Ret | 151 |
| 16 | (United Kingdom) Oliver Stewart | 14 | 19 | 16 | 15 | 19 | 7 | 18 | 15 | 1 | 13 | Ret | 7^{3} | 12 | DNS | C | 19 | 15 | 9^{5} | 9 | 8 | 12^{2} | Ret | 21 | 5^{4} | 150 |
| 17 | (Japan) Souta Arao | Ret | 6 | 15^{7} | Ret | Ret | WD | 13 | Ret | 13^{2} | 8 | 10 | 22 | 13 | 18 | C | DNS | 14 | Ret | 5 | 9 | 17^{3} | 5 | 13 | 15^{4} | 146 |
| 18 | (South Korea) Michael Shin | 10 | 5 | 4^{9} | 20 | 11 | 19 | 16 | Ret | Ret | 12 | 8 | 19 | | | | 8 | 17 | 6^{7} | Ret | 18 | 15^{10} | 16 | 20 | 17 | 144 |
| 19 | (United Kingdom) Edward Pearson | 16 | 16 | 3 | 18 | 21 | 12 | 11 | 7 | 18 | 18 | 15 | 5^{1} | 19 | 19 | C | 14 | Ret | 4 | Ret | 17 | Ret | 14 | 17 | 2 | 134 |
| 20 | (Hong Kong) Gerrard Xie | 21 | DNS | 8^{3} | 17 | 14 | 17^{5} | 5 | 4 | 14^{3} | 17 | 17 | 17 | 17 | 17 | C | 15 | 20 | Ret | 18 | 19 | Ret | 17 | 19 | 1^{2} | 128 |
| 21 | (France) Arthur Rogeon | 18 | 20 | Ret | 21 | 10 | 3^{2} | Ret | 17 | 20 | 16 | 21 | 2 | 16 | 13 | C | 12 | Ret | Ret | 15 | 16 | 3^{7} | 13 | Ret | 14 | 123 |
| 22 | (Turkey) Daniel Mavlyutov | Ret | 15 | 1 | 19 | 13 | 18^{3} | Ret | 22 | 17 | 24 | 18 | 1 | 21 | 21 | C | 20 | 19 | 1 | 19 | 21 | 1^{1} | 20 | 14 | 19 | 116 |
| 23 | (Brazil) Lucas Staico | 23 | 17 | Ret | 16 | 18 | 15^{9} | 14 | 16 | 5^{2} | 22 | 19 | 3 | 15 | 16 | C | 18 | 18 | 3^{2} | WD | WD | WD | | | | 98 |
| 24 | (Japan) Ayato Iwasaki | 13 | 14 | 2^{6} | 22 | 17 | 9 | 17 | 18 | 8 | 19 | 14 | 6^{2} | WD | WD | C | WD | WD | WD | | | | | | | 85 |
| 25 | (United States) Shawn Rashid | 17 | Ret | Ret | 23 | 16 | 16^{4} | Ret | 19 | Ret | 23 | 20 | 23 | Ret | 20 | C | 21 | Ret | Ret | DNS | 20 | 6 | | | | 28 |
| 26 | (Australia) Patrick Heuzenroeder | | | | | | | | | | | | | | | | | | | 21 | 22 | Ret | 18 | 18 | 3 | 21 |
| 27 | (United Kingdom) Jack Sherwood | | | | | | | | | | | | | | | | | | | 20 | Ret | 22 | | | | 1 |
| Pos | Driver | R1 | R2 | R3 | R4 | R5 | R6 | R7 | R8 | R9 | R10 | R11 | R12 | R13 | R14 | R15 | R16 | R17 | R18 | R19 | R20 | R21 | R22 | R23 | R24 | Pts |
| Pos | Driver | OUL (United Kingdom) | | | SIL1 (United Kingdom) | | | SPA (Belgium) | | | SNE (United Kingdom) | | | SIL2 (United Kingdom) | | | BRH (United Kingdom) | | | ZAN (Netherlands) | | | DON (United Kingdom) | | | Pts |

| Colour | Result |
|---|---|
| Gold | Winner |
| Silver | Second place |
| Bronze | Third place |
| Green | Points classification |
| Blue | Non-points classification |
| Blue | Non-classified finish (NC) |
| Purple | Retired, not classified (Ret) |
| Red | Did not qualify (DNQ) |
| Red | Did not pre-qualify (DNPQ) |
| Black | Disqualified (DSQ) |
| White | Did not start (DNS) |
| White | Withdrew (WD) |
| White | Race cancelled (C) |
| Blank | Did not practice (DNP) |
| Blank | Did not arrive (DNA) |
| Blank | Excluded (EX) |

**Bold** – Pole

Italics – Fastest Lap

=== Teams' championship ===
Each team counted its two best results of every race.

| Pos | Team | OUL (United Kingdom) | | | SIL1 (United Kingdom) | | | SPA (Belgium) | | | SNE (United Kingdom) | | | SIL2 (United Kingdom) | | | BRH (United Kingdom) | | | ZAN (Netherlands) | | | DON (United Kingdom) | | | Pts |
| Pos | Team | R1 | R2 | R3 | R4 | R5 | R6 | R7 | R8 | R9 | R10 | R11 | R12 | R13 | R14 | R15 | R16 | R17 | R18 | R19 | R20 | R21 | R22 | R23 | R24 | Pts |
|---|---|---|---|---|---|---|---|---|---|---|---|---|---|---|---|---|---|---|---|---|---|---|---|---|---|---|
| 1 | JHR Developments | 1 | 3 | 12^{13} | 1 | 1 | 20 | 4 | 9 | 2^{10} | 2 | 4 | 10^{8} | 1 | 2 | C | 1 | 2 | 7^{3} | 3 | 5 | 4^{5} | 2 | 4 | 10 | 844 |
| 1 | JHR Developments | 2 | 11 | 9^{7} | 3 | 7 | 23 | 9 | 10 | 15^{6} | 6 | 13 | 18^{6} | 6 | 4 | C | 6 | 5 | 12^{8} | 6 | 7 | 13^{8} | 10 | 8 | 13^{8} | 844 |
| 2 | Rodin Carlin | 3 | 2 | 6^{8} | 2 | 3 | 4^{8} | 2 | 2 | 10^{15} | 3 | 6 | 11^{12} | 3 | 5 | C | 2 | 1 | 10^{8} | 7 | 6 | 5^{10} | 1 | 2 | 12^{10} | 750 |
| 2 | Rodin Carlin | 19 | 7 | Ret | 6 | 4 | 11^{8} | 10 | 12 | 9^{5} | 10 | 11 | 15^{1} | 18 | 14 | C | 7 | 12 | 14^{9} | 10 | 14 | 7^{5} | 11 | 15 | 18 | 750 |
| 3 | Arden VRD | 4 | 1 | 11^{10} | 9 | 12 | 1^{3} | 8 | 6 | 4^{6} | 1 | 1 | 8^{9} | 7 | 8 | C | 4 | 8 | 2^{5} | 4 | 3 | 2^{4} | 4 | 6 | 4^{7} | 716 |
| 3 | Arden VRD | 11 | 10 | 7 | 12 | 15 | 2^{7} | 12 | 8 | 16^{3} | 7 | 3 | 13^{6} | 9 | 10 | C | 13 | 13 | 5^{1} | 16 | 4 | 19^{3} | 8 | 11 | 11^{7} | 716 |
| 4 | Hitech Pulse-Eight | 6 | 5 | 4^{9} | 4 | 11 | 6^{12} | 1 | 1 | 6^{18} | 4 | 2 | 12^{9} | 5 | 6 | C | 8 | 4 | 6^{7} | 1 | 1 | 15^{10} | 3 | 1 | 9^{11} | 699 |
| 4 | Hitech Pulse-Eight | 10 | 6 | 10^{9} | 20 | Ret | 19 | 13 | Ret | 13^{2} | 8 | 8 | 19 | 13 | 18 | C | Ret | 14 | 11^{8} | 5 | 9 | 16^{8} | 5 | 13 | 15^{4} | 699 |
| 5 | Elite Motorsport | 13 | 14 | 2^{6} | 5 | 2 | 5^{8} | 7 | 3 | 1 | 9 | 5 | 6^{2} | 2 | 1 | C | 3 | 3 | 9^{5} | 2 | 2 | 11^{12} | 18 | 5 | 3 | 603 |
| 5 | Elite Motorsport | 14 | 18 | 16 | 15 | 17 | 7 | 17 | 15 | 11^{12} | 13 | 14 | 7^{3} | 12 | DNS | C | 19 | 15 | 16^{6} | 9 | 8 | 12^{2} | Ret | 18 | 6^{6} | 603 |
| 6 | Fortec Motorsports | 7 | 4 | 5^{10} | 10 | 5 | 12 | 6 | 7 | 3^{6} | 15 | 12 | 4 | 10 | 7 | C | 10 | 6 | 4 | 8 | 13 | 8^{9} | 6 | 3 | 2 | 528 |
| 6 | Fortec Motorsports | 9 | 16 | 3 | 13 | 8 | 21 | 11 | 11 | 18 | 18 | 15 | 5^{1} | 19 | 9 | C | 11 | 11 | Ret | 13 | 17 | 9^{2} | 7 | 9 | 7^{6} | 528 |
| 7 | Douglas Motorsport | 5 | 8 | 13^{7} | 14 | 9 | 8^{15} | 3 | 5 | 7^{15} | 5 | 19 | 3 | 4 | 3 | C | 5 | 7 | 3^{2} | 12 | 10 | 6 | 9 | 7 | Ret | 412 |
| 7 | Douglas Motorsport | 17 | 17 | Ret | 16 | 16 | 15^{9} | 14 | 16 | 5^{2} | 22 | 20 | 23 | 15 | 16 | C | 18 | 18 | Ret | DNS | 20 | 18 | | | | 412 |
| 8 | Chris Dittmann Racing | 15 | 12 | 17 | 7 | 10 | 3^{2} | 20† | 17 | 20 | 11 | 7 | 2 | 8 | 12 | C | 9 | 9 | 8^{9} | 11 | 16 | 3^{7} | 13 | Ret | 14 | 276 |
| 8 | Chris Dittmann Racing | 18 | 20 | Ret | 21 | Ret | 13 | Ret | 20 | Ret | 16 | 21 | 9^{4} | 16 | 13 | C | 12 | Ret | Ret | 15 | 23 | 10^{3} | | | | 276 |
| 9 | Hillspeed | 21 | 15 | 1 | 17 | 13 | 17^{5} | 5 | 4 | 14^{3} | 17 | 17 | 1 | 17 | 17 | C | 15 | 19 | 1 | 18 | 19 | 1^{1} | 17 | 14 | 1 | 244 |
| 9 | Hillspeed | Ret | DNS | 8^{3} | 19 | 14 | 18^{3} | Ret | 22 | 17 | 24 | 18 | 17 | 21 | 21 | C | 20 | 20 | Ret | 19 | 21 | Ret | 20 | 19 | 19 | 244 |
| Pos | Team | R1 | R2 | R3 | R4 | R5 | R6 | R7 | R8 | R9 | R10 | R11 | R12 | R13 | R14 | R15 | R16 | R17 | R18 | R19 | R20 | R21 | R22 | R23 | R24 | Pts |
| Pos | Team | OUL (United Kingdom) | | | SIL1 (United Kingdom) | | | SPA (Belgium) | | | SNE (United Kingdom) | | | SIL2 (United Kingdom) | | | BRH (United Kingdom) | | | ZAN (Netherlands) | | | DON (United Kingdom) | | | Pts |
