= 2020 BRDC British Formula 3 Championship =

Motor racing competition

The 2020 BRDC British Formula 3 Championship was a motor racing championship for open wheel, formula racing cars held across England. The 2020 season was the fifth and final organised by the British Racing Drivers' Club in the United Kingdom. The championship featured a mix of professional motor racing teams and privately funded drivers, and also featured the 2-litre 230-bhp Tatuus-Cosworth single seat race car in the main series. The season commenced at Oulton Park on 1 August and ended on 8 November at Silverstone Circuit, after seven triple and quadruple header events for a total of twenty-four races. Kaylen Frederick won the drivers' championship ahead of Kush Maini and British driver Louis Foster.

== Teams and drivers ==
All teams are British-registered.

| Team | No. | Driver | Rounds |
|---|---|---|---|
| JHR Developments | 5 | (United States) Carter Williams | 2, 5, 7 |
| JHR Developments | 12 | (United Kingdom) Ayrton Simmons | 7 |
| JHR Developments | 81 | (United Kingdom) Max Marzorati | 2, 5 |
| Fortec Motorsports | 7 | (Brazil) Roberto Faria | 4–7 |
| Fortec Motorsports | 18 | (United Kingdom) Jonny Wilkinson | 7 |
| Fortec Motorsports | 34 | (United Kingdom) Frank Bird | 4 |
| Carlin | 8 | (United States) Kaylen Frederick | All |
| Carlin | 17 | (Malaysia) Nazim Azman | All |
| Carlin | 99 | (Brazil) Guilherme Peixoto | 1–2 |
| Chris Dittmann Racing | 12 | (United Kingdom) Ayrton Simmons | 3 |
| Chris Dittmann Racing | 25 | (Argentina) Nicolás Varrone | 1–2 |
| Chris Dittmann Racing | 43 | (United Kingdom) Josh Skelton | All |
| Chris Dittmann Racing | 81 | (United Kingdom) Max Marzorati | 6–7 |
| Chris Dittmann Racing | 90 | (United Kingdom) Alex Fores | 4–5 |
| Hitech Grand Prix | 13 | (United States) Reece Ushijima | All |
| Hitech Grand Prix | 14 | (India) Kush Maini | All |
| Lanan Racing | 21 | (United Kingdom) Josh Mason | All |
| Lanan Racing | 22 | (United Kingdom) Piers Prior | All |
| Lanan Racing | 50 | (Australia) Bart Horsten | All |
| Double R Racing | 24 | (United States) Benjamin Pedersen (Note: Benjamin Pedersen is a Danish-American driver competing under an American licence.) | All |
| Double R Racing | 26 | (United Kingdom) Louis Foster | All |
| Douglas Motorsport | 55 | (Belgium) Ulysse de Pauw | All |
| Douglas Motorsport | 71 | (Jordan) Manaf Hijjawi | All |
| Douglas Motorsport | 87 | (United Kingdom) Kiern Jewiss | 1–4 |
| Hillspeed | 62 | (United Kingdom) Oliver Clarke | All |
| Hillspeed | 79 | (Thailand) Sasakorn Chaimongkol | All |

== Race calendar and results ==
The original calendar was revealed on 14 September 2019. On 14 May 2020 a revised provisional calendar was announced with a delayed start to the season due to the 2019-20 coronavirus pandemic. On 11 June 2020, the rescheduled calendar was completed to feature 24 races over seven meetings. The series supported British GT.

| Round | | Circuit | Date | Pole position | Fastest lap | Winning driver | Winning team |
|---|---|---|---|---|---|---|---|
| 1 | R1 | Oulton Park (International Circuit, Cheshire) | 1 August | (United Kingdom) Louis Foster | (United States) Kaylen Frederick | (United Kingdom) Kiern Jewiss (Note: Original race winner Kaylen Frederick was penalized for a false start.) | Douglas Motorsport |
| 1 | R2 | Oulton Park (International Circuit, Cheshire) | 1 August | | (Australia) Bart Horsten | (United Kingdom) Piers Prior | Lanan Racing |
| 1 | R3 | Oulton Park (International Circuit, Cheshire) | 2 August | (United Kingdom) Louis Foster | (United States) Kaylen Frederick | (United States) Kaylen Frederick | Carlin |
| 1 | R4 | Oulton Park (International Circuit, Cheshire) | 2 August | (United States) Kaylen Frederick | (United States) Kaylen Frederick | (United States) Kaylen Frederick | Carlin |
| 2 | R5 | Donington Park (Grand Prix Circuit, Leicestershire) | 15 August | (United States) Kaylen Frederick | (Belgium) Ulysse de Pauw | (United Kingdom) Louis Foster | Double R Racing |
| 2 | R6 | Donington Park (Grand Prix Circuit, Leicestershire) | 16 August | | (United States) Kaylen Frederick | (Belgium) Ulysse de Pauw | Douglas Motorsport |
| 2 | R7 | Donington Park (Grand Prix Circuit, Leicestershire) | 16 August | (India) Kush Maini | (United States) Kaylen Frederick | (United States) Kaylen Frederick | Carlin |
| 3 | R8 | Brands Hatch (Grand Prix Circuit, Kent) | 29 August | (United Kingdom) Ayrton Simmons | (Belgium) Ulysse de Pauw | (United Kingdom) Ayrton Simmons | Chris Dittmann Racing |
| 3 | R9 | Brands Hatch (Grand Prix Circuit, Kent) | 29 August | | (Belgium) Ulysse de Pauw | (Malaysia) Nazim Azman | Carlin |
| 3 | R10 | Brands Hatch (Grand Prix Circuit, Kent) | 30 August | (United Kingdom) Ayrton Simmons | (United Kingdom) Ayrton Simmons | (United Kingdom) Ayrton Simmons | Chris Dittmann Racing |
| 3 | R11 | Brands Hatch (Grand Prix Circuit, Kent) | 30 August | (India) Kush Maini | (India) Kush Maini | (India) Kush Maini | Hitech Grand Prix |
| 4 | R12 | Donington Park (Grand Prix Circuit, Leicestershire) | 19 September | (United States) Kaylen Frederick | (United States) Kaylen Frederick | (United States) Kaylen Frederick | Carlin |
| 4 | R13 | Donington Park (Grand Prix Circuit, Leicestershire) | 20 September | | (United States) Reece Ushijima | (United Kingdom) Louis Foster | Double R Racing |
| 4 | R14 | Donington Park (Grand Prix Circuit, Leicestershire) | 20 September | (United States) Kaylen Frederick | (United States) Kaylen Frederick | (India) Kush Maini | Hitech Grand Prix |
| 5 | R15 | Snetterton Circuit (300 Circuit, Norfolk) | 3 October | (United Kingdom) Louis Foster | (United Kingdom) Louis Foster | (United States) Kaylen Frederick | Carlin |
| 5 | R16 | Snetterton Circuit (300 Circuit, Norfolk) | 3 October | | (Belgium) Ulysse de Pauw | (India) Kush Maini | Hitech Grand Prix |
| 5 | R17 | Snetterton Circuit (300 Circuit, Norfolk) | 4 October | (United Kingdom) Louis Foster | (United States) Kaylen Frederick | (United Kingdom) Louis Foster | Double R Racing |
| 5 | R18 | Snetterton Circuit (300 Circuit, Norfolk) | 4 October | (United Kingdom) Louis Foster | (United States) Kaylen Frederick | (Belgium) Ulysse de Pauw | Douglas Motorsport |
| 6 | R19 | Donington Park (Grand Prix Circuit, Leicestershire) | 25 October | (United States) Kaylen Frederick | (Belgium) Ulysse de Pauw | (United States) Kaylen Frederick | Carlin |
| 6 | R20 | Donington Park (Grand Prix Circuit, Leicestershire) | 25 October | | (Belgium) Ulysse de Pauw | (Malaysia) Nazim Azman | Carlin |
| 6 | R21 | Donington Park (Grand Prix Circuit, Leicestershire) | 25 October | (United States) Kaylen Frederick | (United States) Kaylen Frederick | (United States) Kaylen Frederick | Carlin |
| 7 | R22 | Silverstone Circuit (Grand Prix, Northamptonshire) | 7 November | (United States) Kaylen Frederick | (United States) Kaylen Frederick | (United States) Kaylen Frederick | Carlin |
| 7 | R23 | Silverstone Circuit (Grand Prix, Northamptonshire) | 8 November | | (Thailand) Sasakorn Chaimongkol | (United States) Benjamin Pedersen | Double R Racing |
| 7 | R24 | Silverstone Circuit (Grand Prix, Northamptonshire) | 8 November | (United States) Kaylen Frederick | (United States) Kaylen Frederick | (United States) Kaylen Frederick | Carlin |
| | | Circuit de Spa-Francorchamps, Spa, Belgium | Cancelled (Note: Originally scheduled for 18-19 July 2020 but was cancelled the COVID-19 pandemic) | | | | |

== Championship standings ==
Scoring system

Points were awarded to the top 20 classified finishers in races one, three and four, with the second race awarding points to only the top 15. Race two, which reversed the order of the race one finishers, providing they set a lap time within 103% of the fastest driver, awarded extra points for positions gained from the drivers' respective starting positions.

| Races | Position, points per race | | | | | | | | | | | | | | | | | | | |
| Races | 1st | 2nd | 3rd | 4th | 5th | 6th | 7th | 8th | 9th | 10th | 11th | 12th | 13th | 14th | 15th | 16th | 17th | 18th | 19th | 20th |
|---|---|---|---|---|---|---|---|---|---|---|---|---|---|---|---|---|---|---|---|---|
| Races 1, 3 & 4 | 35 | 29 | 24 | 21 | 19 | 17 | 15 | 13 | 12 | 11 | 10 | 9 | 8 | 7 | 6 | 5 | 4 | 3 | 2 | 1 |
| Race 2 | 20 | 17 | 15 | 13 | 11 | 10 | 9 | 8 | 7 | 6 | 5 | 4 | 3 | 2 | 1 | | | | | |

Notes

- ^{1} ^{2} ^{3} refers to positions gained and thus extra points earned during race two.

=== Drivers' championship ===
| Pos | Driver | OUL | | | | DON1 | | | BRH | | | | DON2 | | | SNE | | | | DON3 | | | SIL (Note: Following an appeal hearing on 15 December 2020, Louis Foster's penalty from Race 2 was overturned, promoting him from 9th to a 5th place finish. He also improved to 3rd place in the final points standings.) | | | Pts |
| Pos | Driver | R1 | R2 | R3 | R4 | R1 | R2 | R3 | R1 | R2 | R3 | R4 | R1 | R2 | R3 | R1 | R2 | R3 | R4 | R1 | R2 | R3 | R1 | R2 | R3 | Pts |
|---|---|---|---|---|---|---|---|---|---|---|---|---|---|---|---|---|---|---|---|---|---|---|---|---|---|---|
| 1 | (United States) Kaylen Frederick | 8 | 14^{2} | 1 | **1** | **8** | 2^{9} | 1 | NC | 12^{3} | Ret | 11 | **1** | 12^{4} | **4** | 1 | 12^{1} | 2 | 2 | **1** | 7^{1} | **1** | **1** | 12^{5} | **1** | 499 |
| 2 | (India) Kush Maini | 14 | 2 | 10 | 2 | 3 | 6^{10} | **3** | 2 | 11^{2} | 3 | **1** | 3 | 10^{4} | 1 | 11 | 1^{2} | 15 | 7 | 9 | 4^{9} | 3 | 3 | 17 | 6 | 448 |
| 3 | (United Kingdom) Louis Foster | **13** | Ret | **3** | 8 | 1 | 8^{10} | 6 | 4 | 14 | 6 | 3 | 11 | 1^{5} | 11 | **2** | 4^{8} | **1** | **5** | Ret | 12 | 4 | 5 | 5^{8} | 16 | 396 |
| 4 | (Belgium) Ulysse de Pauw | 2 | 11^{2} | DSQ | 11 | 18 | 1 | 8 | 3 | 7^{5} | Ret | 2 | 2 | 9^{6} | 2 | 5 | 2^{7} | 5 | 1 | 2 | 3^{4} | 8 | Ret | 13^{5} | 15 | 392 |
| 5 | (Malaysia) Nazim Azman | 3 | 12 | 2 | 4 | 10 | 7^{2} | 10 | 11 | 1^{3} | 10 | 8 | 5 | 14 | 3 | 3 | 10^{1} | 11 | 3 | 7 | 1^{1} | 6 | 11 | 3^{4} | 11 | 370 |
| 6 | (United Kingdom) Josh Skelton | 4 | 10^{1} | 7 | 6 | 6 | 14 | 2 | 6 | 8^{1} | 2 | 6 | 13 | 6 | 14 | 7 | 3^{4} | Ret | 6 | Ret | 6^{6} | 10 | 7 | 10^{1} | 7 | 320 |
| 7 | (Thailand) Sasakorn Chaimongkol | 5 | 8^{2} | 9 | 7 | 7 | 17 | 12 | 7 | 10 | 4 | 5 | 9 | 11 | 5 | 10 | 16 | 6 | 11 | 4 | 5 | 2 | 9 | 7^{2} | 5 | 318 |
| 8 | (United Kingdom) Oliver Clarke | 7 | 7^{1} | 6 | 12 | 14 | 3^{2} | 18 | 9 | 4^{2} | 11 | 12 | 7 | 8^{2} | 15 | 4 | 9^{1} | 7 | 4 | 3 | 9 | Ret | 6 | 4^{8} | 4 | 310 |
| 9 | (United States) Benjamin Pedersen | 11 | 4 | 12 | 15 | 9 | 5^{5} | 7 | 8 | 6^{1} | 9 | 10 | 6 | 15 | 9 | Ret | 6^{11} | 3 | 14 | 6 | 2^{1} | 5 | 15 | 1^{2} | 14 | 299 |
| 10 | (Australia) Bart Horsten | 12 | 3 | 5 | Ret | 11 | 4^{4} | 14 | 13 | 3 | 7 | 7 | 4 | 13 | 7 | 8 | 8 | 10 | 9 | 11 | 10^{6} | 7 | 8 | 2^{8} | Ret | 288 |
| 11 | (United States) Reece Ushijima | 10 | 6 | 15 | 10 | 2 | 15^{2} | 13 | 14 | 2 | 8 | 9 | 8 | 4^{5} | 6 | 9 | 11 | 13 | 10 | 10 | 13^{1} | Ret | DSQ | 15^{4} | 8 | 244 |
| 12 | (United Kingdom) Piers Prior | 15 | 1 | 11 | 3 | 4 | 13^{2} | 11 | DSQ | 13^{3} | Ret | 14 | 10 | 7 | Ret | 14 | 5 | 8 | 8 | Ret | 11 | 12 | 10 | 9 | 12 | 214 |
| 13 | (United Kingdom) Kiern Jewiss | 1 | 13^{1} | 4 | 5 | 5 | 12^{2} | 5 | 5 | 5^{5} | 5 | 4 | NC | 17 | 8 | | | | | | | | | | | 211 |
| 14 | (Brazil) Roberto Faria | | | | | | | | | | | | 16 | 5 | 12 | 12 | 18 | 12 | 15 | 5 | 8 | 9 | 4 | 8^{6} | 2 | 152 |
| 15 | (Jordan) Manaf Hijjawi | 16 | Ret | 13 | 13 | 13 | Ret | 15 | 12 | 16 | Ret | Ret | 12 | 3^{2} | Ret | 6 | 7^{1} | 4 | 16 | Ret | Ret | 13 | 14 | 14 | 17 | 144 |
| 16 | (United Kingdom) Josh Mason | Ret | 15^{2} | 14 | 14 | 12 | 10 | Ret | 10 | 9 | 12 | 13 | 14 | 2^{1} | 13 | Ret | 17^{1} | 9 | Ret | Ret | 14^{1} | 11 | 16 | 19 | 13 | 139 |
| 17 | (United Kingdom) Ayrton Simmons | | | | | | | | **1** | 15 | **1** | Ret | | | | | | | | | | | 2 | 18 | 3 | 124 |
| 18 | (United States) Carter Williams | | | | | 16 | 9 | 17 | | | | | | | | 15 | 13^{2} | 14 | 12 | | | | 12 | 6 | 10 | 73 |
| 19 | (Brazil) Guilherme Peixoto | 6 | 9 | 8 | 9 | 15 | Ret | 9 | | | | | | | | | | | | | | | | | | 67 |
| 20 | (Argentina) Nicolás Varrone | 9 | 5^{1} | Ret | Ret | Ret | 11^{8} | 4 | | | | | | | | | | | | | | | | | | 58 |
| 21 | (United Kingdom) Max Marzorati | | | | | 17 | 16 | 16 | | | | | | | | 16 | 15^{1} | 16 | 17 | 8 | 15 | 14 | 17 | 11 | Ret | 55 |
| 22 | (United Kingdom) Alex Fores | | | | | | | | | | | | 15 | Ret | DSQ | 13 | 14 | Ret | 13 | | | | | | | 24 |
| 23 | (United Kingdom) Jonny Wilkinson | | | | | | | | | | | | | | | | | | | | | | 13 | 16 | 9 | 20 |
| 24 | (United Kingdom) Frank Bird | | | | | | | | | | | | Ret | 16^{2} | 10 | | | | | | | | | | | 13 |
| Pos | Driver | R1 | R2 | R3 | R4 | R1 | R2 | R3 | R1 | R2 | R3 | R4 | R1 | R2 | R3 | R1 | R2 | R3 | R4 | R1 | R2 | R3 | R1 | R2 | R3 | Pts |
| Pos | Driver | OUL | | | | DON1 | | | BRH | | | | DON2 | | | SNE | | | | DON3 | | | SIL | | | Pts |

| Colour | Result |
|---|---|
| Gold | Winner |
| Silver | Second place |
| Bronze | Third place |
| Green | Points classification |
| Blue | Non-points classification |
| Blue | Non-classified finish (NC) |
| Purple | Retired, not classified (Ret) |
| Red | Did not qualify (DNQ) |
| Red | Did not pre-qualify (DNPQ) |
| Black | Disqualified (DSQ) |
| White | Did not start (DNS) |
| White | Withdrew (WD) |
| White | Race cancelled (C) |
| Blank | Did not practice (DNP) |
| Blank | Did not arrive (DNA) |
| Blank | Excluded (EX) |

**Bold** – Pole

Italics – Fastest Lap
