= KMR Sport =

British motor racing team

(United Kingdom) KMR Sport
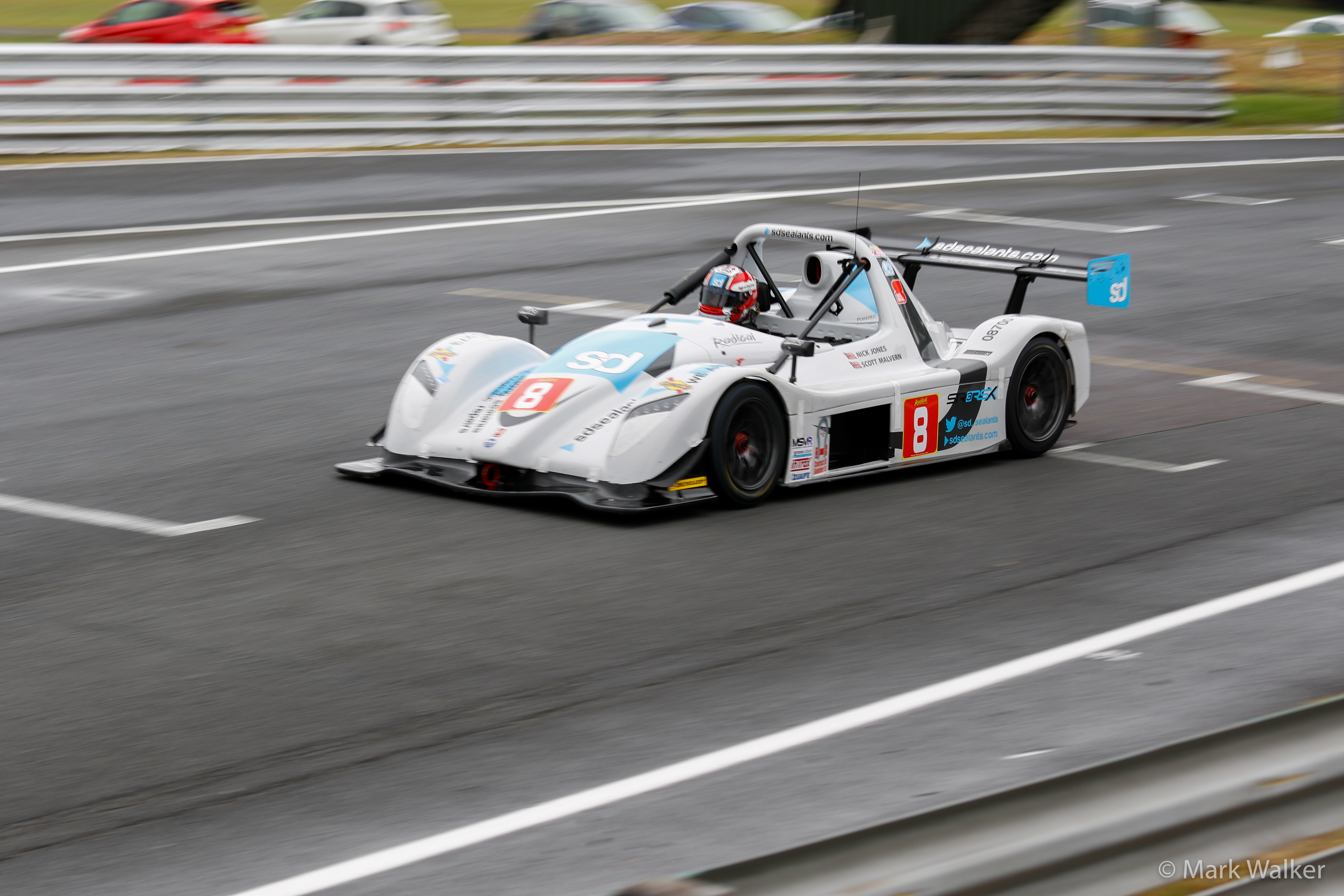
- Founded: 1998
- Base: Saul, Gloucestershire
- Team principal(s): Kevin Mills
- Founder(s): Kevin Mills
- Current series: GB4 Championship
- Former series: British Formula Ford Championship
- Current drivers: GB4 Championship: 3. (Republic of Ireland) Alex O'Grady; 15. (United Kingdom) Lily-May Watkins; 23. (United Kingdom) Holly Miall
- Teams' Championships: GB4 Championship: 2022, 2023, 2024
- Drivers' Championships: GB4 Championship: 2023: Tom Mills; 2026: Alex O'Grady; Walter Hayes Trophy: 2011, 2013, 2017, 2018, 2019, 2026
- Website: www.kmrsport.com

KMR Sport is a British auto racing team, based in Saul, Gloucestershire, United Kingdom, currently participated in GB4 Championship. Founded in 1998 as Kevin Mills Racing, the team is considered a front-runner in Formula Ford and GB4, having won five Walter Hayes Trophy driver champions between 2011 and 2019 before repeating in 2026, as well as team titles in the latter between 2022 and 2024.

Notable past drivers for the team include Jarrod Waberski, Dan Cammish, Megan Gilkes, Scott Malvern and Alex Jones, while F1 Sim Racing drivers Brendon Leigh and Lucas Blakeley also formerly drove for the team as well.

== History ==
=== Early years ===
According to KMR Sport's official website, the team was founded in 1998 by Kevin Mills as Kevin Mills Racing. However, the team formerly stated that its foundation date was 1994. From 2004 to 2010, the team competed in British Formula Ford Championship.

=== 2011–2020 ===
According to the team's profile in GB4 Championship's website, KMR Sport is one of the leading teams in Formula Ford 1600. The team's drivers won Walter Hayes Trophy five times, in 2011, 2013, 2017, 2018 and 2019. In mid-2010s, the team also raced in Radical Sportscars's one-make racing championships.

=== 2021–2024 ===
In October 2021, the team was announced to join GB4 Championship from the 2022 season, having stepped up from Formula Ford 1600. The team won the GB4 teams' title for the first time in 2022, with Tom Mills and Jarrod Waberski driving for the team.

In January 2023, according to information from British Government's Companies House, a company, named KMR Operations, was incorporated. It is responsible for KMR Sport's activities.

While the team was rebranded from Kevin Mills Racing to KMR Sport, in 2023 GB4 Championship, it signed Jeremy Fairbairn and Jack Clifford. Later, Tom Mills joined the team and won the Drivers' Championship, while KMR Sport also won the Teams' Championships for the second time.

In 2024 GB4 Championship, KMR Sport won the third consecutive Teams' Championships, with Harry Burgoyne Jr., Chloe Grant, Brandon McCaughan and Lucas Blakeley driving for the team.

=== 2025–2026 ===
During an interview with Motorsport News published in late-February 2025, team owner Kevin Mills mentioned about the possible expansion to Ginetta Junior Championship and GB3 Championship.

For the 2025 GB4 campaign, the team signed Alex O'Grady, Lily-May Watkins and Megan Bruce. However, the team finished sixth in team's standing, losing the teams' title to Elite Motorsport. O'Grady and Watkins remained with the team for 2026, while Holly Miall was signed to replace Bruce. The team also won Walter Hayes Trophy driver title in 2026 after seven years, with Tom Mills driving for the team.

== Current series results ==
=== GB4 Championship ===
Year	Car	Drivers	Races	Wins	Poles	F/Laps	Podiums	Points	D.C.	T.C.
2022	Tatuus F4-T014	(South Africa) Jarrod Waberski	24	4	0	1	14	496	2nd	1st
2022	Tatuus F4-T014	(United Kingdom) Tom Mills	24	2	0	0	8	435	4th	1st
2023	Tatuus F4-T014	(United Kingdom) Tom Mills	17	10	10	7	14	505	1st	1st
2023	Tatuus F4-T014	(Australia) Jack Clifford	20	0	0	0	0	207	7th	1st
2023	Tatuus F4-T014	(United States) Jeremy Fairbairn	12	1	0	0	1	190	9th	1st
2023	Tatuus F4-T014	(United Kingdom) Lucas Blakeley	6	0	0	0	1	89	15th	1st
2024	Tatuus F4-T014	(United Kingdom) Harry Burgoyne Jr.	20	2	0	1	9	421	3rd	1st
2024	Tatuus F4-T014	(United Kingdom) Lucas Blakeley	15	4	0	7	9	306	5th	1st
2024	Tatuus F4-T014	(United Kingdom) Chloe Grant	20	0	0	0	1	208	8th	1st
2024	Tatuus F4-T014	(Republic of Ireland) Brandon McCaughan	8	2	2	1	4	171	13th	1st
2025	Tatuus MSV GB4-025	(Republic of Ireland) Alex O'Grady	21	1	0	1	3	250	8th	6th
2025	Tatuus MSV GB4-025	(United Kingdom) Megan Bruce	17	0	0	0	0	113	20th	6th
2025	Tatuus MSV GB4-025	(United Kingdom) Lily-May Watkins	21	0	0	0	0	39	27th	6th
2025	Tatuus MSV GB4-025	(United Kingdom) Lewis Wherrell	3	0	0	0	0	28	29th	6th
2026	Tatuus MSV GB4-025	(Republic of Ireland) Alex O'Grady	21	3	2	4	9	445	1st	6th
2026	Tatuus MSV GB4-025	(United Kingdom) Lily-May Watkins	18	0	0	0	0	48	27th	6th
2026	Tatuus MSV GB4-025	(United Kingdom) Holly Miall	21	0	0	0	0	45	28th	6th

== Timeline ==
Current series
GB4 Championship	2022–present
Former series
British Formula Ford Championship	2004–2010
