= 2022 GB4 Championship =

Motor racing championship

The 2022 GB4 Championship partnered by the BRDC was the first season of a new motor racing championship for open wheel, formula racing cars in Britain. The 2022 season was the inaugural season for the championship, which was organised by MotorSport Vision. The season ran over eight triple-header rounds and started on 2 April at Snetterton Circuit.

GB4 acts as a direct feeder series to higher open-wheel categories, including the existing GB3 Championship partnered by the BRDC. GB4 runs primarily on the same British GT race programme as GB3, and retains many of the same championship partners. Teams use the Tatuus F4-T014 chassis in the 2022 championship. The car is powered by a 1.4 litre turbocharged 160 HP engine by Autotecnica Motori.

GB4 offered its inaugural champion a £50,000 prize towards their next season of single-seater racing as part of the overall prize package. Other prizes included the George Russell Pole Position Cup with a prize fund of £4,000 and a £20,000 shoot out prize for teenage drivers in the BRSCC National Formula Ford Championship.

All 24 races in the debut season were shown live online.

== Teams and drivers ==
All teams are British-registered.

| Team | No. | Driver | Rounds |
|---|---|---|---|
| Valour Racing | 2 | (Philippines) Daryl DeLeon | 4 |
| Valour Racing | 3 | (United Kingdom) Danny Harrison | 4 |
| Rossoverde Racing | 5 | (United Kingdom) Christian Lester | 8 |
| Rossoverde Racing | 7 | (United Kingdom) Christian Lester | 1, 3–4, 6–7 |
| Fortec Motorsport | 8 | (Sweden) Elias Adestam | 1–3 |
| Fortec Motorsport | 17 | (United Kingdom) Jessica Edgar | All |
| Fortec Motorsport | 32 | (Thailand) Carl Bennett | 8 |
| Fortec Motorsport | 66 | (United Kingdom) Nikolas Taylor (Note: Taylor is a Malaysian-British driver competing under a British licence.) | All |
| Graham Brunton Racing | 9 | (United Kingdom) Logan Hannah | All |
| Graham Brunton Racing | 10 | (United Kingdom) Chloe Grant | All |
| Graham Brunton Racing | 12 | (United Kingdom) George Line | 2 |
| Scorpio Motorsport | 14 | (South Africa) Aqil Alibhai | 8 |
| Elite Motorsport | 18 | (United Kingdom) William Macintyre | 8 |
| Elite Motorsport | 41 | (United Kingdom) Alex Walker | 1–4 |
| Elite Motorsport | 78 | (United Kingdom) Jack Sherwood | All |
| Kevin Mills Racing | 20 | (South Africa) Jarrod Waberski | All |
| Kevin Mills Racing | 21 | (United Kingdom) Tom Mills | All |
| Privateer | 41 | (United Kingdom) Alex Walker | 5 |
| Hillspeed | 62 | (United Kingdom) Oliver Clarke | 8 |
| Hillspeed | 64 | (Canada) Megan Gilkes | All |
| Hillspeed | 81 | (United Kingdom) Max Marzorati | All |
| Hillspeed | 88 | (United Kingdom) Marcus Short | 6 |
| Oldfield Motorsport | 73 | (United Kingdom) Lucas Romanek | 3 |

== Calendar ==
The provisional calendar was announced on 22 October 2021. The championship will support the British GT championship at seven of its eight meetings.

| Round | | Circuit | Date | Pole position | Fastest lap | Winning driver | Winning team |
|---|---|---|---|---|---|---|---|
| 1 | R1 | Snetterton Circuit (300 Circuit, Norfolk) | 2 April | (United Kingdom) Nikolas Taylor | (United Kingdom) Nikolas Taylor | (United Kingdom) Nikolas Taylor | Fortec Motorsports |
| 1 | R2 | Snetterton Circuit (300 Circuit, Norfolk) | 3 April | (United Kingdom) Nikolas Taylor | (United Kingdom) Nikolas Taylor | (United Kingdom) Alex Walker | Elite Motorsport |
| 1 | R3 | Snetterton Circuit (300 Circuit, Norfolk) | 3 April | | (United Kingdom) Nikolas Taylor | (Canada) Megan Gilkes | Hillspeed |
| 2 | R4 | Oulton Park (International Circuit, Cheshire) | 16 April | (United Kingdom) Alex Walker | (United Kingdom) Alex Walker | (United Kingdom) Alex Walker | Elite Motorsport |
| 2 | R5 | Oulton Park (International Circuit, Cheshire) | 18 April | (United Kingdom) Alex Walker | (United Kingdom) Alex Walker | (United Kingdom) Alex Walker | Elite Motorsport |
| 2 | R6 | Oulton Park (International Circuit, Cheshire) | 18 April | | (Canada) Megan Gilkes | (South Africa) Jarrod Waberski | Kevin Mills Racing |
| 3 | R7 | Silverstone Circuit (Grand Prix Circuit, Northamptonshire) | 7 May | (United Kingdom) Alex Walker | (United Kingdom) Nikolas Taylor | (United Kingdom) Nikolas Taylor | Fortec Motorsports |
| 3 | R8 | Silverstone Circuit (Grand Prix Circuit, Northamptonshire) | 8 May | (United Kingdom) Nikolas Taylor | (United Kingdom) Nikolas Taylor | (United Kingdom) Nikolas Taylor | Fortec Motorsports |
| 3 | R9 | Silverstone Circuit (Grand Prix Circuit, Northamptonshire) | 8 May | | (United Kingdom) Jack Sherwood | (United Kingdom) Lucas Romanek | Oldfield Motorsport |
| 4 | R10 | Donington Park (Grand Prix Circuit, Leicestershire) | 28 May | (United Kingdom) Nikolas Taylor | (United Kingdom) Jack Sherwood | (United Kingdom) Nikolas Taylor | Fortec Motorsports |
| 4 | R11 | Donington Park (Grand Prix Circuit, Leicestershire) | 29 May | (Canada) Megan Gilkes | (Canada) Megan Gilkes | (Canada) Megan Gilkes | Hillspeed |
| 4 | R12 | Donington Park (Grand Prix Circuit, Leicestershire) | 29 May | | (Canada) Megan Gilkes | (United Kingdom) Logan Hannah | Graham Brunton Racing |
| 5 | R13 | Snetterton Circuit (300 Circuit, Norfolk) | 25 June | (United Kingdom) Nikolas Taylor | (United Kingdom) Jack Sherwood | (United Kingdom) Nikolas Taylor | Fortec Motorsports |
| 5 | R14 | Snetterton Circuit (300 Circuit, Norfolk) | 26 June | (United Kingdom) Nikolas Taylor | (United Kingdom) Nikolas Taylor | (South Africa) Jarrod Waberski | Kevin Mills Racing |
| 5 | R15 | Snetterton Circuit (300 Circuit, Norfolk) | 26 June | | (United Kingdom) Jack Sherwood | (United Kingdom) Jack Sherwood | Elite Motorsport |
| 6 | R16 | Silverstone Circuit (Grand Prix Circuit, Northamptonshire) | 30–31 July | (United Kingdom) Max Marzorati (Note: Megan Gilkes set the fastest time in qualifying, but received a three-place grid penalty for an incident at the previous round at Snetterton. Max Marzorati was promoted to pole position in her place.) | (United Kingdom) Max Marzorati | (United Kingdom) Nikolas Taylor | Fortec Motorsports |
| 6 | R17 | Silverstone Circuit (Grand Prix Circuit, Northamptonshire) | 30–31 July | (United Kingdom) Max Marzorati | (United Kingdom) Max Marzorati | (United Kingdom) Nikolas Taylor | Fortec Motorsports |
| 6 | R18 | Silverstone Circuit (Grand Prix Circuit, Northamptonshire) | 30–31 July | | (United Kingdom) Nikolas Taylor | (United Kingdom) Nikolas Taylor | Fortec Motorsports |
| 7 | R19 | Brands Hatch (Grand Prix Circuit, Kent) | 10–11 September | (United Kingdom) Nikolas Taylor | (United Kingdom) Nikolas Taylor | (United Kingdom) Tom Mills | Kevin Mills Racing |
| 7 | R20 | Brands Hatch (Grand Prix Circuit, Kent) | 10–11 September | (United Kingdom) Nikolas Taylor | (United Kingdom) Jack Sherwood | (United Kingdom) Nikolas Taylor | Fortec Motorsports |
| 7 | R21 | Brands Hatch (Grand Prix Circuit, Kent) | 10–11 September | | (South Africa) Jarrod Waberski | (United Kingdom) Jack Sherwood | Elite Motorsport |
| 8 | R22 | Donington Park (Grand Prix Circuit, Leicestershire) | 15–16 October | (United Kingdom) Jack Sherwood | (United Kingdom) William Macintyre | (United Kingdom) Tom Mills | Kevin Mills Racing |
| 8 | R23 | Donington Park (Grand Prix Circuit, Leicestershire) | 15–16 October | (United Kingdom) Nikolas Taylor | (United Kingdom) Nikolas Taylor | (South Africa) Jarrod Waberski | Kevin Mills Racing |
| 8 | R24 | Donington Park (Grand Prix Circuit, Leicestershire) | 15–16 October | | (United Kingdom) Nikolas Taylor | (South Africa) Jarrod Waberski | Kevin Mills Racing |

== Championship standings ==
Scoring system

Points were awarded to the top 20 classified finishers in races one and two, with the third race awarding points to only the top 15. Race three, which had its grid formed by reversing the qualifying order, awarded extra points for positions gained from the drivers' respective starting positions.

| Races | Position, points per race | | | | | | | | | | | | | | | | | | | |
| Races | 1st | 2nd | 3rd | 4th | 5th | 6th | 7th | 8th | 9th | 10th | 11th | 12th | 13th | 14th | 15th | 16th | 17th | 18th | 19th | 20th |
|---|---|---|---|---|---|---|---|---|---|---|---|---|---|---|---|---|---|---|---|---|
| Races 1 & 2 | 35 | 29 | 24 | 21 | 19 | 17 | 15 | 13 | 12 | 11 | 10 | 9 | 8 | 7 | 6 | 5 | 4 | 3 | 2 | 1 |
| Race 3 | 20 | 17 | 15 | 13 | 11 | 10 | 9 | 8 | 7 | 6 | 5 | 4 | 3 | 2 | 1 | | | | | |

Notes

- ^{1} ^{2} ^{3} refers to positions gained and thus extra points earned during race three.

=== Drivers' championship ===
| Pos | Driver | SNE1 | | | OUL | | | SIL1 | | | DON1 | | | SNE2 | | | SIL2 | | | BRH | | | DON2 | | | Pts |
| Pos | Driver | R1 | R2 | R3 | R1 | R2 | R3 | R1 | R2 | R3 | R1 | R2 | R3 | R1 | R2 | R3 | R1 | R2 | R3 | R1 | R2 | R3 | R1 | R2 | R3 | Pts |
|---|---|---|---|---|---|---|---|---|---|---|---|---|---|---|---|---|---|---|---|---|---|---|---|---|---|---|
| 1 | (United Kingdom) Nikolas Taylor | 1 | 6 | 8^{2} | 6 | 3 | 5^{4} | 1 | 1 | Ret | 1 | 2 | 6^{7} | 1 | Ret | 5^{4} | 1 | 1 | 1^{6} | Ret | 1 | 2^{6} | 2 | 4 | 3^{8} | 546 |
| 2 | (South Africa) Jarrod Waberski | 5 | 3 | 5^{3} | 3 | 4 | 1^{2} | 7 | 2 | Ret | 8 | 5 | 3^{3} | 2 | 1 | 4^{3} | Ret | 3 | 3^{5} | 3 | 2 | 4^{3} | 3 | 1 | 1^{6} | 496 |
| 3 | (United Kingdom) Max Marzorati | 4 | 4 | 2^{3} | 2 | 6 | 3^{4} | 3 | 3 | 6^{3} | 2 | 4 | 4^{6} | 4 | 2 | 2^{4} | 9 | 2 | 2^{8} | 4 | 6 | 6 | 7 | 6 | 8 | 482 |
| 4 | (United Kingdom) Tom Mills | 3 | 2 | 4^{2} | 11 | 2 | 8 | 9 | 9 | 7 | 4 | 6 | 5^{3} | 6 | 5 | 3^{5} | 2 | 4 | 6 | 1 | 8 | 3^{3} | 1 | Ret | 5^{7} | 435 |
| 5 | (United Kingdom) Jack Sherwood | 8 | 7 | 7 | 7 | 10 | 6 | 5 | 5 | 3^{8} | 6 | 3 | 2^{5} | 3 | 3 | 1^{3} | Ret | 6 | 5^{4} | 2 | 3 | 1^{3} | DNS | 5 | 4^{9} | 417 |
| 6 | (Canada) Megan Gilkes | 7 | Ret | 1^{1} | 4 | 5 | 11 | 6 | 4 | 4^{4} | 7 | 1 | 8^{4} | 5 | 4 | 7 | 3 | 5 | 4^{7} | 6 | 7 | 9 | 5 | Ret | 9 | 375 |
| 7 | (United Kingdom) Jessica Edgar | 9 | 9 | 10 | 10 | 12 | 2 | 11 | 10 | 10 | 11 | 12 | 10 | 9 | 8 | 9 | 4 | 8 | 9 | 5 | 5 | 7 | 13 | 8 | 7 | 269 |
| 8 | (United Kingdom) Alex Walker | 2 | 1 | 6^{3} | 1 | 1 | 7^{3} | 2 | Ret | 8^{4} | 5 | 9 | 7^{4} | WD | WD | WD | | | | | | | | | | 244 |
| 9 | (United Kingdom) Chloe Grant | 11 | 8 | Ret | 9 | 11 | 12 | 13 | 11 | 11 | 12 | 11 | 11 | 7 | 6 | 6 | 8 | 11 | 10 | 7 | 4 | 5 | 8 | 7 | Ret | 242 |
| 10 | (United Kingdom) Logan Hannah | 10 | Ret | 9 | Ret | 8 | 9 | 10 | 8 | 2 | 10 | 10 | 1^{3} | 8 | 7 | 8 | 7 | 7 | 7 | 8 | Ret | 8 | 9 | Ret | 10 | 238 |
| 11 | (Sweden) Elias Adestam | 6 | 5 | 3^{1} | 5 | 7 | 4^{1} | 4 | 6 | 5^{2} | | | | | | | | | | | | | | | | 151 |
| 12 | (United Kingdom) Christian Lester | 12 | 10 | 11^{1} | | | | 12 | 12 | 9^{4} | 13 | 13 | 12 | | | | 6 | 10 | 11 | WD | WD | WD | 11 | 10 | 11^{3} | 137 |
| 13 | (United Kingdom) William Macintyre | | | | | | | | | | | | | | | | | | | | | | 6 | 2 | 2^{8} | 71 |
| 14 | (United Kingdom) Lucas Romanek | | | | | | | 8 | 7 | 1^{4} | | | | | | | | | | | | | | | | 52 |
| 15 | (Philippines) Daryl DeLeon | | | | | | | | | | 3 | 8 | 9 | | | | | | | | | | | | | 44 |
| 16 | (United Kingdom) Marcus Short | | | | | | | | | | | | | | | | 5 | 9 | 8 | | | | | | | 39 |
| 17 | (United Kingdom) Oliver Clarke | | | | | | | | | | | | | | | | | | | | | | 10 | 3 | Ret | 35 |
| 18 | (South Africa) Aqil Alibhai | | | | | | | | | | | | | | | | | | | | | | 4 | Ret | 6^{2} | 33 |
| 19 | (United Kingdom) George Line | | | | 8 | 9 | 10^{1} | | | | | | | | | | | | | | | | | | | 32 |
| 20 | (United Kingdom) Danny Harrison | | | | | | | | | | 9 | 7 | Ret | | | | | | | | | | | | | 27 |
| 21 | (Thailand) Carl Bennett | | | | | | | | | | | | | | | | | | | | | | 12 | 9 | 12 | 25 |
