= GB4 Championship =

Open-wheel motorsport formula based in the United Kingdom

- Category: Single seaters
- Country: United Kingdom
- Inaugural season: 2022
- Constructors: Tatuus
- Engine suppliers: Abarth
- Tyre suppliers: Pirelli
- Drivers' champion: (Republic of Ireland) Alex O'Grady
- Teams' champion: (United Kingdom) Elite Motorsport
- Official website: www.gb-4.net

The GB4 Championship is a single seater motorsport series based in the United Kingdom. The championship is operated by MotorSport Vision with support from the BRDC, and is aimed at young drivers graduating from karting or club level motorsport such as Formula Ford. The championship was announced in September 2021 and the first season started at Snetterton in April 2022.

== History ==
The championship was launched in early September 2021.

The first round of the inaugural season took place at Snetterton Circuit on 2 April 2022, with the first winner being Nikolas Taylor driving for Fortec Motorsports.

== Car ==
From 2022 to 2024, the GB4 Championship used the Tatuus F4-T014 car previously used by the Italian, ADAC, Spanish and other F4 championships across Europe.

The engine is an Abarth-branded, turbocharged Autotecnica Motori 1.4L FTJ I4 and produces 160hp. It features a sequential six-speed gearbox developed by Sadev and Magneti Marelli electronics.

Starting in 2025, the series will introduce the Tatuus MSV GB4-025, a modified version of the Tatuus MSV-022, used by the GB3 Championship from 2022 to 2024. The new chassis will feature a Mountune 2.0L engine.

== Costs ==
Costs of running in the initial years of the championship were significantly lower than Formula 4 due to the use of the older Tatuus F4-T014, which could be purchased second hand (as in many cases it was no longer eligible for use in Formula 4). As the GB3 Championship usually runs at the same event weekends and uses a modified version of the same car, many spare parts can be shared if a team runs in both categories.

The organiser states that privateer teams can run in the championship for approximately £60,000, and fully professional teams for around £150,000

A prize to the value of £50,000 was offered to the 2024 champion if the champion subsequently chooses to compete in either the British F4 championship, or GB3, in 2025.

== Female competitors ==
One distinctive feature of the GB4 championship is the relatively high number, and competitiveness, of female drivers. In 2024, four of the 21 competitors were women. Alisha Palmowski finished second in the 2024 championship, and received a £30,000 prize to be used to help fund entry into the F1 Academy series in 2025. In 2025 the price was raised to £50,000 and was won by Ava Dobson who passed Megan Bruce in the Championship in the last weekend of the series at Donington Park.

== Points system ==
Points are awarded to the top 20 classified finishers in races one and two, with the third race awarding points to only the top 15. Race three, which has its grid formed by reversing the qualifying order, awards extra points for positions gained from the drivers' respective starting positions.

Races	Position, points per race																			
Races	1st	2nd	3rd	4th	5th	6th	7th	8th	9th	10th	11th	12th	13th	14th	15th	16th	17th	18th	19th	20th
Races 1 & 2	35	29	24	21	19	17	15	13	12	11	10	9	8	7	6	5	4	3	2	1
Race 3	20	17	15	13	11	10	9	8	7	6	5	4	3	2	1					

== Champions ==
Season	Driver	Team	Poles	Wins	Podiums	Fastest laps	Points	Clinched	Margin
2022	(United Kingdom) Nikolas Taylor	Fortec Motorsports	9	9	14	10	546	Race 24 of 24	50
2023	(United Kingdom) Tom Mills	KMR Sport	10	10	14	7	505	Race 21 of 24	111
2024	(Sweden) Linus Granfors	Fortec Motorsports	3	6	10	3	467	Race 20 of 21	45
2025	(India) Ary Bansal	Elite Motorsport	2	4	11	4	402	Race 21 of 21	11
2026	(Republic of Ireland) Alex O'Grady	KMR Sport	2	3	9	3	445	Race 20 of 21	33

== Circuits ==
Number	Circuits	Rounds	Years
1	(United Kingdom) Silverstone Circuit	8 (Note: Silverstone Circuit hosted 2 rounds in 2022—2025.)	2022–present
1	(United Kingdom) Donington Park	8 (Note: Donington Park hosted 2 rounds in 2022—2025.)	2022–present
3	(United Kingdom) Snetterton Circuit	5 (Note: Snetterton Circuit hosted 2 rounds in 2022.)	2022–present
4	(United Kingdom) Oulton Park	4	2022–present
4	(United Kingdom) Brands Hatch	4	2022–present
