= Josh Skelton =

British racing driver (born 2001)

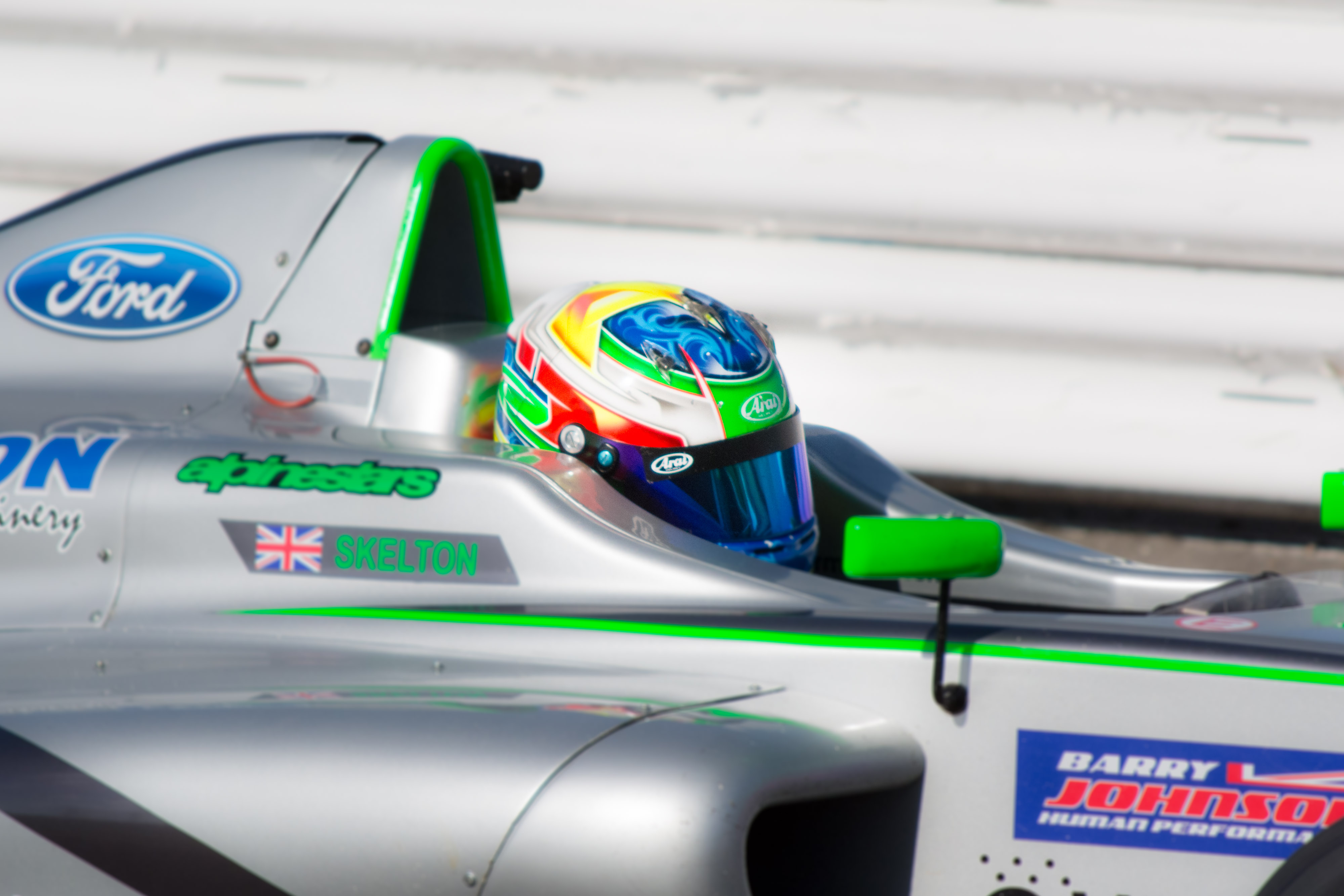
- Skelton in 2018
- Nationality: (United Kingdom) British
- Born: 7 November 2001 (age 25) Dearham, England
- Categorisation: FIA Silver (2021); FIA Gold (2022–)

Josh Skelton (born 7 November 2001) is a British racing driver who last competed in the LMP3 class of the Le Mans Cup for Nielsen Racing.

== Career ==
Skelton began karting in June of 2010, taking the Northern Karting Federation and Rowrah Kart Club Championship the following year. Continuing in karting until 2017, Skelton most notably finished third in the Super One Series' Senior Max class. In 2018, Skelton joined JHR Developments to make his single-seater debut in the F4 British Championship. In his rookie year in the series, Skelton took a best result of fifth at Brands Hatch, Thruxton and Croft en route to a tenth-place overall points finish and fourth among the rookies.

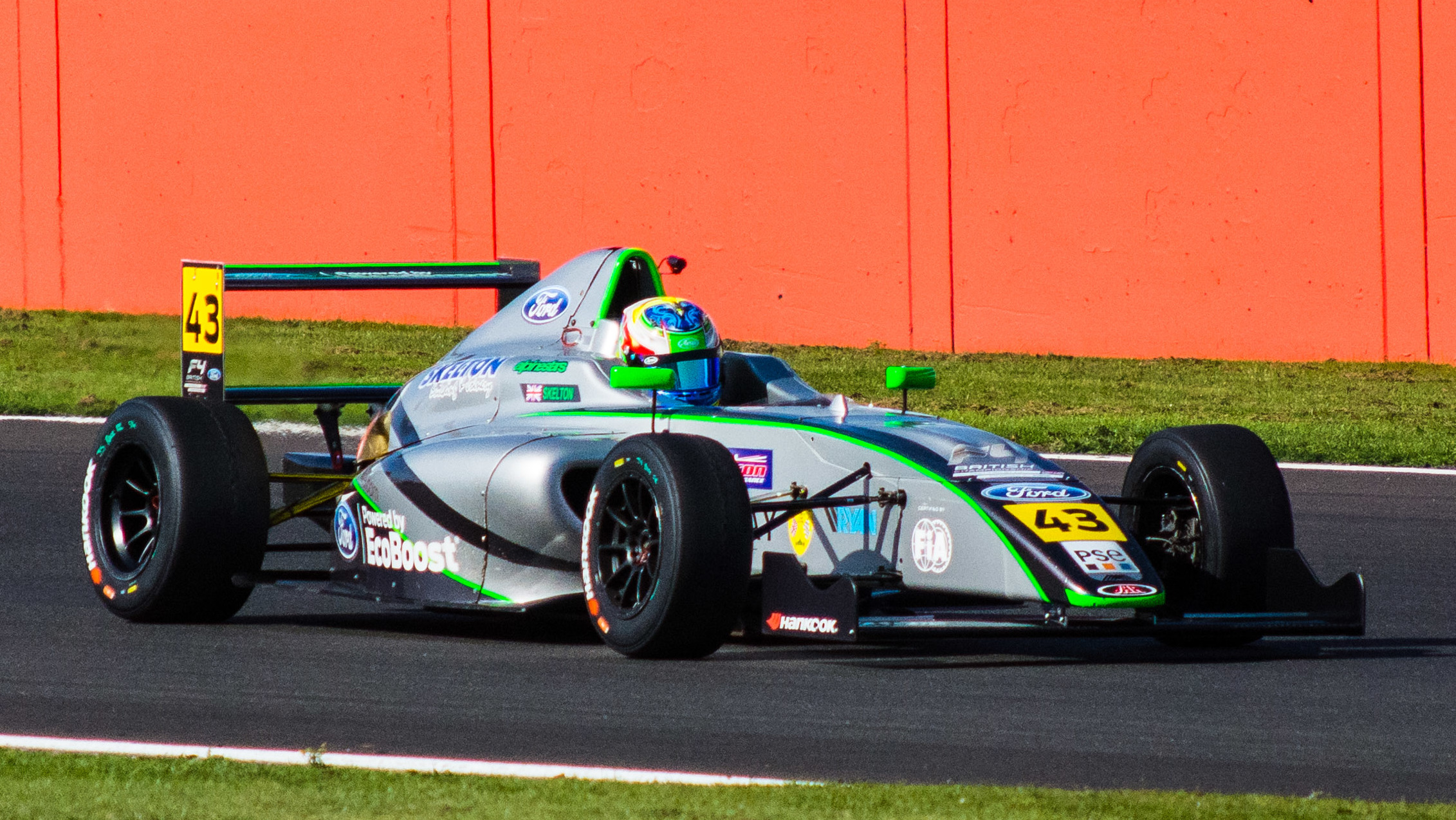
Skelton at Silverstone in 2018.

Returning to JHR Developments for his sophomore season in the series the following year, Skelton began the season by scoring podiums at Donington Park and Thruxton, before taking his maiden series win at Croft in a rain-shortened race two. Skelton then scored four podiums in the following two rounds, including a second-place finish in race two at Snetterton, in which he lost out on the win by 0.099s against Tommy Foster following Luke Browning's post-race penalty from the win. In the following round at Thruxton, Skelton scored what became his final win of the season in race two, and ended the year fourth in points after scoring six other podiums in the remaining three rounds. In 2020, Skelton joined Chris Dittmann Racing to compete in the BRDC British Formula 3 Championship. In his only season in the series, Skelton scored a best result of second twice, at both Donington Park and Brands Hatch, as well as third-place finish in race two at Snetterton to end the year sixth in points.

Switching to endurance racing for 2021, Skelton joined Cool Racing to compete in the LMP3 class of the Le Mans Cup alongside Antoine Doquin. In his first season in the series, Skelton took a lone win at Spa and ended the season seventh in the LMP3 standings. During 2021, Skelton also made a one-off appearance in the IMSA SportsCar Championship, racing for WIN Autosport at the Petit Le Mans in LMP3. Returning to Le Mans Cup and LMP3 competition the following year, Skelton switched to Racing Spirit of Léman for his sophomore year in the series, alongside Jacques Wolff. In the seven-race season, Skelton finished second in race one of the Road to Le Mans, and a pair of third-place finishes at Monza and Spa en route to a sixth-place points finish. Switching to Nielsen Racing for 2023, Skelton scored his only win of the year at the season-ending race at Algarve alongside Anthony Wells to end his three-year tenure in the series ninth in the LMP3 standings.

== Karting record ==
=== Karting career summary ===
Season	Series	Team	Position
2011	Trent Valley Kart Club — Comer Cadet		39th
2012	Trent Valley Kart Club — Comer Cadet		22nd
2012	Super One Series — Comer Cadet		13th
2012	British Karting Championship — Comer Cadet		17th
2013	Super One Series — Mini Max		9th
2013	Trent Valley Kart Club — Mini Max		42nd
2013	Kartmasters British GP — Mini Max		10th
2014	Super One Series — Junior Max		6th
2014	Kartmasters British GP — Rotax Junior		8th
2015	Rotax Winter Cup — Junior Max	Strawberry Racing	29th
2015	Super One Series — Junior Max	Strawberry Racing	10th
2015	Kartmasters British GP — Rotax Junior		6th
2016	Rotax Winter Cup — Senior Max	Strawberry Racing	15th
2016	Super One Series — Rotax Max	Coles Racing	3rd
2016	Rotax Euro Challenge — X30 Senior	Coles Racing	7th
2016	RMC Grand Finals — Senior Max	John Skelton	23rd
2016	Kartmasters British GP — X30 Senior		5th
2017	Super One Series — X30 Senior		8th
2017	Kartmasters British GP — X30 Senior		10th

== Racing record ==
=== Racing career summary ===
Season	Series	Team	Races	Wins	Poles	F/Laps	Podiums	Points	Position
2018	F4 British Championship	JHR Developments	30	0	0	1	0	84	10th
2019	F4 British Championship	JHR Developments	29	2	0	5	14	326.5	4th
2020	BRDC British Formula 3 Championship	Chris Dittmann Racing	24	0	0	0	3	320	6th
2021	Le Mans Cup – LMP3	Cool Racing	7	1	0	0	1	38.5	7th
2021	IMSA SportsCar Championship – LMP3	WIN Autosport	1	0	0	0	0	230	34th
2022	Le Mans Cup – LMP3	Racing Spirit of Léman	7	0	0	0	3	39	6th
2023	Le Mans Cup – LMP3	Nielsen Racing	7	1	0	1	1	30	9th

^{†} As Skelton was a guest driver, he was ineligible for championship points.

=== Complete F4 British Championship results ===
(key) (Races in bold indicate pole position; races in italics indicate fastest lap)

Year	Team	1	2	3	4	5	6	7	8	9	10	11	12	13	14	15	16	17	18	19	20	21	22	23	24	25	26	27	28	29	30	DC	Points
2018	JHR Developments	BHI; 1; 12	BHI; 2; 11	BHI; 3; 5	DON; 1; 11	DON; 2; 10	DON; 3; 8	THR; 1; 7	THR; 2; 5	THR; 3; 7	OUL; 1; 11	OUL; 2; 11	OUL; 3; 9	CRO; 1; 7	CRO; 2; 5	CRO; 3 Ret	SNE; 1; 9	SNE; 2; 7	SNE; 3; 13	ROC; 1; 10	ROC; 2; 8	ROC; 3; 6	KNO; 1; 10	KNO; 2 Ret	KNO; 3; 8	SIL; 1 Ret	SIL; 2; 9	SIL; 3; 11	BHGP; 1; 11	BHGP; 2 Ret	BHGP; 3; 10	10th	84
2019	JHR Developments	BHI; 1; 8	BHI; 2 Ret	BHI; 3; 12	DON; 1; 2	DON; 2; 7	DON; 3; 4	THR1; 1; 3	THR1; 2; 5	THR1; 3; 5	CRO; 1; 6	CRO; 2; 1	CRO; 3 Ret	OUL; 1; 2	OUL; 2 DNS	OUL; 3; 2	SNE; 1; 6	SNE; 2; 2	SNE; 3; 3	THR2; 1; 3	THR2; 2; 1	THR2; 3; 2	KNO; 1; 2	KNO; 2; 3	KNO; 3; 3	SIL; 1; 3	SIL; 2; 9	SIL; 3; 4	BHGP; 1; 7	BHGP; 2; 10	BHGP; 3; 4	4th	326.5

=== Complete BRDC British Formula 3 Championship results ===
(key) (Races in bold indicate pole position) (Races in italics indicate fastest lap)

Year	Team	1	2	3	4	5	6	7	8	9	10	11	12	13	14	15	16	17	18	19	20	21	22	23	24	Pos	Points
2020	Chris Dittmann Racing	OUL; 1; 4	OUL; 2; 10^{1}	OUL; 3; 7	OUL; 4; 6	DON1; 1; 6	DON1; 2; 14	DON1; 3; 2	BRH; 1; 6	BRH; 2; 8^{1}	BRH; 3; 2	BRH; 4; 6	DON2; 1; 13	DON2; 2; 6	DON2; 3; 14	SNE; 1; 7	SNE; 2; 3^{4}	SNE; 3 Ret	SNE; 4; 6	DON3; 1 Ret	DON3; 2; 6^{6}	DON3; 3; 10	SIL; 1; 7	SIL; 2; 10^{1}	SIL; 3; 7	6th	320

=== Complete Le Mans Cup results ===
(key) (Races in bold indicate pole position; results in italics indicate fastest lap)

Year	Entrant	Class	Chassis	1	2	3	4	5	6	7	Rank	Points
2021	Cool Racing	LMP3	Ligier JS P320	BAR; 11	LEC; Ret	MNZ; 7	LMS; 1; 7	LMS; 2; 17	SPA; 1	POR; 15	7th	38.5
2022	Racing Spirit of Léman	LMP3	Ligier JS P320	LEC; 29	IMO; 22	LMS; 1; 2	LMS; 2; 26	MNZ; 3	SPA; 3	ALG; Ret	6th	39
2023	Nielsen Racing	LMP3	Ligier JS P320	CAT; Ret	LMS; 1; 18	LMS; 2; 8	LEC; 23	ARA; Ret	**SPA**; Ret	ALG; 1	9th	30

=== Complete IMSA SportsCar Championship results ===
(key) (Races in bold indicate pole position) (Races in italics indicate fastest lap)

Year	Entrant	Class	Chassis	Engine	1	2	3	4	5	6	7	Pos.	Pts
2021	WIN Autosport	LMP3	Duqueine M30 - D08	Nissan VK56 V8 5.6L V8	DAY	SEB	MDO	WGL	WGL	ELK	PET; 8	230	34th
