= 2020 F4 British Championship =

The 2020 F4 British Championship certified by FIA – powered by Ford EcoBoost was a multi-event, Formula 4 open-wheel single seater motor racing championship held across United Kingdom. The championship featured a mix of professional motor racing teams and privately funded drivers, competing in Formula 4 cars that conformed to the technical regulations for the championship. This, the sixth season, following on from the British Formula Ford Championship, was also the sixth year that the cars conformed to the FIA's Formula 4 regulations. Part of the TOCA tour, it formed part of the extensive program of support categories built up around the BTCC centrepiece.

The season commenced on 1 August at Donington Park and concluded on 15 November at the Brands Hatch Indy Circuit, after twenty-six races held at nine meetings, all in support of the 2020 British Touring Car Championship.

Luke Browning was crowned champion at Brands Hatch, finishing four points ahead of his championship rival Zak O'Sullivan.

== Teams and drivers ==
All teams were British-registered.

Team	No.	Drivers	Class	Rounds
Carlin	1	(Peru) Matías Zagazeta	R	All
Carlin	21	(Australia) Christian Mansell	R	All
Carlin	51	(United Kingdom) Zak O'Sullivan		All
Fortec Motorsport	7	(Brazil) Roberto Faria		1–4, 9
Fortec Motorsport	8	(Mexico) Rafael Villagómez	R	1–2, 4–5, 7–8
Fortec Motorsport	11	(United Kingdom) Luke Browning		All
Argenti Motorsport	18	(Saudi Arabia) Reema Juffali		All
Argenti Motorsport	25	(United Kingdom) Casper Stevenson		All
Argenti Motorsport	87	(Chile) Nico Pino	R	1–4
TRS Arden Junior Team	27	(United Kingdom) Alex Connor		All
TRS Arden Junior Team	55	(Poland) Roman Biliński		All
TRS Arden Junior Team	78	(United Kingdom) Frederick Lubin	R	All
JHR Developments	49	(United Kingdom) Abbi Pulling		All
JHR Developments	67	(United Kingdom) James Hedley		All
JHR Developments	95	(United Kingdom) Nathanael Hodgkiss		1–4

Icon	Class
R	Rookie

== Race calendar ==
The original calendar was announced on 16 June 2019. A revised provisional calendar was announced on 27 April 2020 with a delayed start to the season due to the COVID-19 pandemic. All races were held in the United Kingdom, supporting the 2020 British Touring Car Championship. Due to limited daylight hours, the Croft event in October has been reduced to 2 races.

Round		Circuit	Date	Pole position	Fastest lap	Winning driver	Winning team	Rookie winner
1	R1	Donington Park (National Circuit, Leicestershire)	1 August	(United Kingdom) James Hedley	(United Kingdom) Luke Browning	(United Kingdom) Alex Connor	TRS Arden Junior Team	(Mexico) Rafael Villagómez
1	R2	Donington Park (National Circuit, Leicestershire)	2 August		(United Kingdom) Zak O'Sullivan	(United Kingdom) Zak O'Sullivan	Carlin	(Mexico) Rafael Villagómez
1	R3	Donington Park (National Circuit, Leicestershire)	2 August	(Brazil) Roberto Faria	(United Kingdom) Luke Browning	(United Kingdom) James Hedley	JHR Developments	(Peru) Matías Zagazeta
2	R4	Brands Hatch (Grand Prix Circuit, Kent)	8 August	(United Kingdom) Zak O'Sullivan	(United Kingdom) Luke Browning	(United Kingdom) Zak O'Sullivan	Carlin	(Australia) Christian Mansell
2	R5	Brands Hatch (Grand Prix Circuit, Kent)	8 August		(United Kingdom) James Hedley	(Australia) Christian Mansell	Carlin	(Australia) Christian Mansell
2	R6	Brands Hatch (Grand Prix Circuit, Kent)	9 August	(United Kingdom) Zak O'Sullivan	(United Kingdom) Zak O'Sullivan	(United Kingdom) Zak O'Sullivan	Carlin	(Australia) Christian Mansell
3	R7	Oulton Park (Island Circuit, Cheshire)	22 August	(United Kingdom) James Hedley	(United Kingdom) James Hedley	(United Kingdom) Luke Browning	Fortec Motorsports	(United Kingdom) Frederick Lubin
3	R8	Oulton Park (Island Circuit, Cheshire)	23 August		(United Kingdom) Luke Browning	(United Kingdom) Luke Browning	Fortec Motorsports	(United Kingdom) Frederick Lubin
3	R9	Oulton Park (Island Circuit, Cheshire)	23 August	(United Kingdom) Luke Browning	(United Kingdom) James Hedley	(United Kingdom) Luke Browning	Fortec Motorsports	(Australia) Christian Mansell
4	R10	Knockhill Racing Circuit (Fife)	29 August	(United Kingdom) Luke Browning	(United Kingdom) Zak O'Sullivan	(United Kingdom) Luke Browning	Fortec Motorsports	(Mexico) Rafael Villagómez
4	R11	Knockhill Racing Circuit (Fife)	30 August		(United Kingdom) Zak O'Sullivan	(United Kingdom) Zak O'Sullivan	Carlin	(Australia) Christian Mansell
4	R12	Knockhill Racing Circuit (Fife)	30 August	(United Kingdom) Luke Browning	(United Kingdom) Luke Browning	(United Kingdom) Luke Browning	Fortec Motorsports	(Mexico) Rafael Villagómez
5	R13	Thruxton Circuit (Hampshire)	19 September	(United Kingdom) James Hedley	(United Kingdom) James Hedley	(United Kingdom) James Hedley	JHR Developments	(United Kingdom) Frederick Lubin
5	R14	Thruxton Circuit (Hampshire)	19 September		(United Kingdom) Casper Stevenson	(United Kingdom) James Hedley	JHR Developments	(United Kingdom) Frederick Lubin
5	R15	Thruxton Circuit (Hampshire)	20 September	(United Kingdom) James Hedley	(United Kingdom) Alex Connor	(United Kingdom) James Hedley	JHR Developments	(Australia) Christian Mansell
6	R16	Silverstone Circuit (National Circuit, Northamptonshire)	26 September	(United Kingdom) Alex Connor	(United Kingdom) Alex Connor	(United Kingdom) Alex Connor	TRS Arden Junior Team	(Peru) Matías Zagazeta
6	R17	Silverstone Circuit (National Circuit, Northamptonshire)	27 September		(United Kingdom) James Hedley	(United Kingdom) Zak O'Sullivan	Carlin	(Australia) Christian Mansell
6	R18	Silverstone Circuit (National Circuit, Northamptonshire)	27 September	(United Kingdom) Alex Connor	(United Kingdom) Casper Stevenson	(United Kingdom) Casper Stevenson	Argenti Motorsport	(Australia) Christian Mansell
7	R19	Croft Circuit (North Yorkshire)	10 October	(United Kingdom) Casper Stevenson	(United Kingdom) Casper Stevenson	(United Kingdom) Zak O'Sullivan	Carlin	(United Kingdom) Frederick Lubin
7	R20	Croft Circuit (North Yorkshire)	11 October	(United Kingdom) Casper Stevenson	(United Kingdom) Luke Browning	(United Kingdom) Casper Stevenson	Argenti Motorsport	(Australia) Christian Mansell
8	R21	Snetterton Motor Racing Circuit (300 Circuit, Norfolk)	24 October	(United Kingdom) Luke Browning	(United Kingdom) Alex Connor	(United Kingdom) Luke Browning (Note: Zak O'Sullivan crossed the line first but was given a 5 second penalty for incidents during the race. Luke Browning inherited the win.)	Fortec Motorsports	(Australia) Christian Mansell
8	R22	Snetterton Motor Racing Circuit (300 Circuit, Norfolk)	24 October		(Poland) Roman Biliński	(United Kingdom) Zak O'Sullivan	Carlin	(Australia) Christian Mansell
8	R23	Snetterton Motor Racing Circuit (300 Circuit, Norfolk)	25 October	(United Kingdom) Zak O'Sullivan	(United Kingdom) Luke Browning	(United Kingdom) Zak O'Sullivan	Carlin	(United Kingdom) Frederick Lubin
9	R24	Brands Hatch (Indy Circuit, Kent)	14 November	(United Kingdom) Luke Browning	(United Kingdom) James Hedley	(United Kingdom) Luke Browning	Fortec Motorsports	(Australia) Christian Mansell
9	R25	Brands Hatch (Indy Circuit, Kent)	15 November		(United Kingdom) James Hedley	(United Kingdom) Alex Connor	TRS Arden Junior Team	(Australia) Christian Mansell
9	R26	Brands Hatch (Indy Circuit, Kent)	15 November	(United Kingdom) Luke Browning	(United Kingdom) Zak O'Sullivan	(United Kingdom) Zak O'Sullivan	Carlin	(Australia) Christian Mansell
Cancelled due to the 2019-20 coronavirus pandemic
Silverstone Circuit (International Circuit, Northamptonshire)			26-27 September					

== Championship standings ==
Points were awarded as follows:

Position	1st	2nd	3rd	4th	5th	6th	7th	8th	9th	10th
Points	25	18	15	12	10	8	6	4	2	1

=== Drivers' standings ===
Pos	Driver	DON			BHGP			OUL			KNO			THR			SIL			CRO		SNE			BHI^{‡}			Pen.	Pts
Pos	Driver	R1	R2	R3	R1	R2	R3	R1	R2	R3	R1	R2	R3	R1	R2	R3	R1	R2	R3	R1	R2	R1	R2	R3	R1	R2	R3	Pen.	Pts
1	(United Kingdom) Luke Browning	2	12	2	2	4	2	1	1	1	1	2	1	3	6	5	4	5	4	6	3	1	4	2	1	2	10	3	412.5
2	(United Kingdom) Zak O'Sullivan	4	1	3	1	Ret	1	2	9	3	4	1	3	5	10	12	2	1	3	1	2	2	1	1	2	4	1	3	408.5
3	(United Kingdom) Casper Stevenson	7	2	6	7	7	6	3	2	9	3	4	2	2	2	3	3	3	1	2	1	5	2	4	11	8	7		328
4	(United Kingdom) Alex Connor	1	Ret	8	3	5	3	5	Ret	5	2	3	4	4	Ret	4	1	6	2	7	Ret	8	6	5	5	1	8	9	265
5	(United Kingdom) James Hedley	5	Ret	1	DNS	9	8	4	4	2	Ret	5	5	1	1	1	5	2	Ret	8	5	9	7	3	8	5	9	9	249
6	(United Kingdom) Abbi Pulling	15	6	Ret	4	3	14	9	5	6	6	Ret	Ret	6	5	2	Ret	8	7	3	4	4	5	6	4	7	3		191.5
7	(Australia) Christian Mansell	12	5	7	6	1	7	8	12	8	9	6	Ret	10	7	7	Ret	7	6	10	6	3	8	9	3	3	2	6	163
8	(Poland) Roman Biliński	8	7	12	8	6	5	6	3	7	5	DSQ	7	8	3	6	7	4	5	5	Ret	6	3	10	7	10	6	21	156
9	(United Kingdom) Frederick Lubin	9	4	10	Ret	13	10	7	6	13	11	10	9	7	4	8	Ret	9	9	4	7	7	10	7	6	6	5		111
10	(Brazil) Roberto Faria	3	Ret	4	5	2	4	14	7	4	7	Ret	6												10	Ret	4		106
11	(Mexico) Rafael Villagómez	6	3	9	Ret	14	13				8	7	8	11	8	9				9	Ret	11	Ret	Ret					47
12	(Peru) Matías Zagazeta	13	9	5	10	8	11	12	13	11	13	9	13	Ret	9	11	6	11	10	12	9	12	11	11	9	Ret	11		34
13	(Saudi Arabia) Reema Juffali	14	10	13	12	12	12	13	10	12	12	11	12	9	Ret	10	8	10	8	11	8	10	9	8	12	9	12		27
14	(Chile) Nico Pino	10	8	11	9	10	Ret	11	8	10	10	12	11																14
15	(United Kingdom) Nathanael Hodgkiss	11	11	Ret	11	11	9	10	11	Ret	Ret	8	10																8
Pos	Driver	DON			BHGP			OUL			KNO			THR			SIL			CRO		SNE			BHI^{‡}			Pen.	Pts
Pos	Driver	R1	R2	R3	R1	R2	R3	R1	R2	R3	R1	R2	R3	R1	R2	R3	R1	R2	R3	R1	R2	R1	R2	R3	R1	R2	R3	Pen.	Pts

=== Rookie Cup ===
Pos	Driver	DON			BHGP			OUL			KNO			THR			SIL			CRO		SNE			BHI^{‡}			Pen.	Pts
Pos	Driver	R1	R2	R3	R1	R2	R3	R1	R2	R3	R1	R2	R3	R1	R2	R3	R1	R2	R3	R1	R2	R1	R2	R3	R1	R2	R3	Pen.	Pts
1	(Australia) Christian Mansell	12	5	7	6	1	7	8	12	8	9	6	Ret	10	7	7	Ret	7	6	10	6	3	8	9	3	3	2	6	496.5
2	(United Kingdom) Frederick Lubin	9	4	10	Ret	13	10	7	6	13	11	10	9	7	4	8	Ret	9	9	4	7	7	10	7	6	6	5		435
3	(Peru) Matías Zagazeta	13	9	5	10	8	11	12	13	11	13	9	13	Ret	9	11	6	11	10	12	9	12	11	11	9	Ret	11		339.5
4	(Mexico) Rafael Villagómez	6	3	9	Ret	14	13				8	7	8	11	8	9				9	Ret	11	Ret	Ret					233
5	(Chile) Nico Pino	10	8	11	9	10	Ret	11	8	10	10	12	11																161
Pos	Driver	R1	R2	R3	R1	R2	R3	R1	R2	R3	R1	R2	R3	R1	R2	R3	R1	R2	R3	R1	R2	R1	R2	R3	R1	R2	R3	Pen.	Pts
Pos	Driver	DON			BHGP			OUL			KNO			THR			SIL			CRO		SNE			BHI^{‡}			Pen.	Pts

Notes: ‡ – Half points were awarded for Race 3, as less than 75% of the scheduled distance was completed.

=== Teams Cup ===
Each team nominated two drivers to score points before every round. All non-nominated drivers were ignored.

Pos	Team	Pts
1	Carlin	609.5
2	Fortec Motorsport	554
3	TRS Arden Junior Team	475
4	JHR Developments	471.5
5	Argenti Motorsport	418.5
