= 2019 F4 British Championship =

Multi-event motor racing

The 2019 F4 British Championship was a multi-event, Formula 4 open-wheel single seater motor racing championship held across United Kingdom. The championship featured a mix of professional motor racing teams and privately funded drivers, competing in Formula 4 cars that conform to the technical regulations for the championship. This, the fifth season, following on from the British Formula Ford Championship, was the fifth year that the cars conformed to the FIA's Formula 4 regulations. Part of the TOCA tour, it formed part of the extensive program of support categories built up around the BTCC centrepiece.

The season commenced on 6 April at Brands Hatch – on the circuit's Indy configuration – and concluded on 13 October at the same venue, utilising the Grand Prix circuit, after thirty races held at ten meetings, all in support of the 2019 British Touring Car Championship.

The rookie cup continued with the top prize being free entry into the 2020 season.

Zane Maloney won both the overall and rookie championship, coming out victorious ten times out of 30 races. His closest title challenger Sebastián Álvarez won five races, one win fewer than third-placed Louis Foster. Carter Williams triumphed thrice, Josh Skelton and Luke Browning won twice respectively, and Bart Horsten and Tommy Foster got one victory each.

== Teams and drivers ==
All teams were British-registered.

Team	No.	Drivers	Class	Rounds
Fortec Motorsport	7	(Brazil) Roberto Faria	R	All
Fortec Motorsport	10	(Mexico) Mariano Martínez		All
Fortec Motorsport	20	(United Kingdom) Chris Lulham	R	9
Richardson Racing	11	(United Kingdom) Luke Browning		All
TRS Arden Junior Team	12	(United Kingdom) Abbie Munro		8–10
TRS Arden Junior Team	27	(United Kingdom) Alex Connor	R	2–10
TRS Arden Junior Team	50	(Australia) Bart Horsten		All
TRS Arden Junior Team	53	(United Kingdom) Tommy Foster		All
Double R Racing	18	(Saudi Arabia) Reema Juffali		All
Double R Racing	26	(United Kingdom) Louis Foster		All
Double R Racing	94	(Mexico) Sebastián Álvarez		All
Carlin	21	(United Kingdom) Joe Turney	R	1–5
Carlin	31	(Barbados) Zane Maloney	R	All
JHR Developments	41	(United Kingdom) Alex Walker	R	5–7, 9
JHR Developments	43	(United Kingdom) Josh Skelton		All
JHR Developments	55	(United States) Carter Williams		All

Icon	Class
R	Rookie

- Fin Green was scheduled to compete for Carlin, but did not appear at any rounds.

== Race calendar ==
The calendar was announced on 5 June 2018. All races were held in the United Kingdom. Round at Rockingham was removed from the schedule in favour of the second Thruxton round. All rounds supported 2019 British Touring Car Championship.

Round		Circuit	Date	Pole position	Fastest lap	Winning driver	Winning team	Rookie winner
1	R1	Brands Hatch (Indy Circuit, Kent)	6 April	(United Kingdom) Joe Turney	(Barbados) Zane Maloney	(United Kingdom) Luke Browning	Richardson Racing	(Barbados) Zane Maloney
1	R2	Brands Hatch (Indy Circuit, Kent)	7 April		(United Kingdom) Luke Browning	(United Kingdom) Louis Foster	Double R Racing	(United Kingdom) Joe Turney
1	R3	Brands Hatch (Indy Circuit, Kent)	7 April	(Mexico) Sebastián Álvarez	(Mexico) Sebastián Álvarez	(Mexico) Sebastián Álvarez	Double R Racing	(Barbados) Zane Maloney
2	R4	Donington Park (National Circuit, Leicestershire)	27 April	(United Kingdom) Louis Foster	(United Kingdom) Tommy Foster	(United Kingdom) Louis Foster	Double R Racing	(United Kingdom) Joe Turney
2	R5	Donington Park (National Circuit, Leicestershire)	28 April		(United Kingdom) Louis Foster	(Australia) Bart Horsten	TRS Arden Junior Team	(United Kingdom) Joe Turney
2	R6	Donington Park (National Circuit, Leicestershire)	28 April	(United Kingdom) Louis Foster	(United Kingdom) Joe Turney	(United Kingdom) Louis Foster	Double R Racing	(United Kingdom) Alex Connor
3	R7	Thruxton Circuit (Hampshire)	18 May	(United Kingdom) Louis Foster	(United Kingdom) Joe Turney	(United Kingdom) Luke Browning	Richardson Racing	(Barbados) Zane Maloney
3	R8	Thruxton Circuit (Hampshire)	19 May		(Mexico) Sebastián Álvarez	(Barbados) Zane Maloney	Carlin	(Barbados) Zane Maloney
3	R9	Thruxton Circuit (Hampshire)	19 May	(United Kingdom) Tommy Foster	(United Kingdom) Louis Foster	(Barbados) Zane Maloney	Carlin	(Barbados) Zane Maloney
4	R10	Croft Circuit (North Yorkshire)	15 June	(Barbados) Zane Maloney	(Barbados) Zane Maloney	(Barbados) Zane Maloney	Carlin	(Barbados) Zane Maloney
4	R11	Croft Circuit (North Yorkshire)	15 June		(United Kingdom) Josh Skelton	(United Kingdom) Josh Skelton	JHR Developments	(Barbados) Zane Maloney
4	R12	Croft Circuit (North Yorkshire)	16 June	(Barbados) Zane Maloney	(Barbados) Zane Maloney	(Barbados) Zane Maloney	Carlin	(Barbados) Zane Maloney
5	R13	Oulton Park (Island Circuit, Cheshire)	29 June	(Barbados) Zane Maloney	(Barbados) Zane Maloney	(Barbados) Zane Maloney	Carlin	(Barbados) Zane Maloney
5	R14	Oulton Park (Island Circuit, Cheshire)	30 June		(United Kingdom) Louis Foster	(Barbados) Zane Maloney	Carlin	(Barbados) Zane Maloney
5	R15	Oulton Park (Island Circuit, Cheshire)	30 June	(Barbados) Zane Maloney	(United Kingdom) Josh Skelton	(Barbados) Zane Maloney	Carlin	(Barbados) Zane Maloney
6	R16	Snetterton Motor Racing Circuit (300 Circuit, Norfolk)	3 August	(Mexico) Sebastián Álvarez	(Mexico) Sebastián Álvarez	(Mexico) Sebastián Álvarez	Double R Racing	(Barbados) Zane Maloney
6	R17	Snetterton Motor Racing Circuit (300 Circuit, Norfolk)	4 August		(United Kingdom) Josh Skelton	(United Kingdom) Tommy Foster	TRS Arden Junior Team	(United Kingdom) Alex Connor
6	R18	Snetterton Motor Racing Circuit (300 Circuit, Norfolk)	4 August	(Mexico) Sebastián Álvarez	(Mexico) Sebastián Álvarez	(Mexico) Sebastián Álvarez	Double R Racing	(Barbados) Zane Maloney
7	R19	Thruxton Circuit (Hampshire)	17 August	(United Kingdom) Luke Browning	(Mexico) Sebastián Álvarez	(United States) Carter Williams	JHR Developments	(Barbados) Zane Maloney
7	R20	Thruxton Circuit (Hampshire)	17 August		(United Kingdom) Louis Foster	(United Kingdom) Josh Skelton	JHR Developments	(Barbados) Zane Maloney
7	R21	Thruxton Circuit (Hampshire)	18 August	(United Kingdom) Luke Browning	(Mexico) Sebastián Álvarez	(United States) Carter Williams	JHR Developments	(Barbados) Zane Maloney
8	R22	Knockhill Racing Circuit (Fife)	14 September	(Barbados) Zane Maloney	(United Kingdom) Josh Skelton	(Barbados) Zane Maloney	Carlin	(Barbados) Zane Maloney
8	R23	Knockhill Racing Circuit (Fife)	15 September		(United Kingdom) Josh Skelton	(United States) Carter Williams	JHR Developments	(United Kingdom) Alex Connor
8	R24	Knockhill Racing Circuit (Fife)	15 September	(Barbados) Zane Maloney	(Australia) Bart Horsten	(United Kingdom) Louis Foster	Double R Racing	(United Kingdom) Alex Connor
9	R25	Silverstone Circuit (National Circuit, Northamptonshire)	28 September	(United Kingdom) Louis Foster	(United Kingdom) Louis Foster	(United Kingdom) Louis Foster	Double R Racing	(Barbados) Zane Maloney
9	R26	Silverstone Circuit (National Circuit, Northamptonshire)	29 September		(United Kingdom) Louis Foster	(Mexico) Sebastián Álvarez	Double R Racing	(Barbados) Zane Maloney
9	R27	Silverstone Circuit (National Circuit, Northamptonshire)	29 September	(United Kingdom) Louis Foster	(United Kingdom) Louis Foster	(United Kingdom) Louis Foster	Double R Racing	(United Kingdom) Chris Lulham
10	R28	Brands Hatch (Grand Prix Circuit, Kent)	12 October	(United Kingdom) Alex Connor	(Barbados) Zane Maloney	(Barbados) Zane Maloney	Carlin	(Barbados) Zane Maloney
10	R29	Brands Hatch (Grand Prix Circuit, Kent)	12 October		(United Kingdom) Louis Foster	(Mexico) Sebastián Álvarez	Double R Racing	(United Kingdom) Alex Connor
10	R30	Brands Hatch (Grand Prix Circuit, Kent)	13 October	(United Kingdom) Alex Connor	(United States) Carter Williams	(Barbados) Zane Maloney	Carlin	(Barbados) Zane Maloney

== Championship standings ==
Points were awarded as follows:

Position	1st	2nd	3rd	4th	5th	6th	7th	8th	9th	10th
Points	25	18	15	12	10	8	6	4	2	1

=== Drivers' standings ===
Pos	Driver	BHI			DON			THR1			CRO^{†}			OUL			SNE			THR2			KNO			SIL			BHGP			Pen.	Pts
Pos	Driver	R1	R2	R3	R1	R2	R3	R1	R2	R3	R1	R2	R3	R1	R2	R3	R1	R2	R3	R1	R2	R3	R1	R2	R3	R1	R2	R3	R1	R2	R3	Pen.	Pts
1	(Barbados) Zane Maloney	3	7	2	8	6	6	2	1	1	1	5	1	1	1	1	3	Ret	4	6	5	6	1	8	NC	5	2	Ret	1	5	1		427
2	(Mexico) Sebastián Álvarez	2	2	1	9	5	2	5	2	3	5	2	Ret	5	9	3	1	11	1	2	3	5	3	2	2	2	1	Ret	3	1	Ret		407
3	(United Kingdom) Louis Foster	7	1	4	1	3	1	10	4	2	3	6	2	6	6	5	8	4	8	12	Ret	3	Ret	5	1	1	3	1	Ret	6	6		353
4	(United Kingdom) Josh Skelton	8	Ret	12	2	7	4	3	5	5	6	1	Ret	2	DNS	2	6	2	3	3	1	2	2	3	3	3	9	4	7	10	4		326.5
5	(Australia) Bart Horsten	5	Ret	6	3	1	8	4	3	7	2	3	3	3	8	7	5	10	2	13†	Ret	4	6	9	10	Ret	5	2	5	2	5	3	275.5
6	(United Kingdom) Luke Browning	1	3	7	DNS	9	3	1	12	9	12	10	7	Ret	5	4	10	3	13	4	4	9	7	4	4	8	6	3	2	3	2		268.5
7	(United States) Carter Williams	9	6	3	7	Ret	7	11	10	6	11	11	8	7	3	11	2	Ret	5	1	6	1	4	1	5	4	10	10	6	8	12		230
8	(United Kingdom) Tommy Foster	4	10	5	10	11	Ret	7	11	4	4	4	5	8	4	12	4	1	6	5	2	7	8	6	6	Ret	8	6	8	9	8		207
9	(United Kingdom) Alex Connor				5	4	5	9	7	10	7	7	6	Ret	7	6	9	5	7	7	11	8	Ret	7	7	6	Ret	8	4	4	3		163
10	(United Kingdom) Joe Turney	6	4	9	4	2	Ret	6	9	8	9	9	4	4	2	Ret																	111
11	(Brazil) Roberto Faria	10	5	8	6	DNS	10	8	6	13	8	8	10	9	11	Ret	7	6	11	10	7	10	5	11	11	9	4	7	Ret	Ret	9		99
12	(Mexico) Mariano Martínez	11	8	10	11	8	9	Ret	8	12	10	12	9	12	10	9	13	7	10	11	10	11	Ret	Ret	Ret	7	12	11	9	7	7		49
13	(Saudi Arabia) Reema Juffali	12	9	11	12	10	11	Ret	13	11	13	13	Ret	11	12	10	12	9	12	9	8	12	Ret	Ret	8	12	14	9	10	11	10		20
14	(United Kingdom) Alex Walker													10	13	8	11	8	9	8	9	13				Ret	11	Ret					17
15	(United Kingdom) Chris Lulham																									11	7	5					16
16	(United Kingdom) Abbie Munro																						9	10	9	10	13	12	11	12	11		6
Pos	Driver	R1	R2	R3	R1	R2	R3	R1	R2	R3	R1	R2	R3	R1	R2	R3	R1	R2	R3	R1	R2	R3	R1	R2	R3	R1	R2	R3	R1	R2	R3	Pen.	Pts
Pos	Driver	BHI			DON			THR1			CRO^{†}			OUL			SNE			THR2			KNO			SIL			BHGP			Pen.	Pts

^{†} Race 2 at Croft Circuit was stopped after two laps due to worsening weather conditions. The results were initially declared void, with the intention of running a fourth race at a later event. However, it was confirmed on 22 July that the original results would stand, with half points being awarded.

=== Rookie Cup ===
Pos	Driver	BHI			DON			THR1			CRO^{†}			OUL			SNE			THR2			KNO			SIL			BHGP			Pen.	Pts
Pos	Driver	R1	R2	R3	R1	R2	R3	R1	R2	R3	R1	R2	R3	R1	R2	R3	R1	R2	R3	R1	R2	R3	R1	R2	R3	R1	R2	R3	R1	R2	R3	Pen.	Pts
1	(Barbados) Zane Maloney	3	7	2	8	6	6	2	1	1	1	5	1	1	1	1	3	Ret	4	6	5	6	1	8	NC	5	2	Ret	1	5	1		608.5
2	(United Kingdom) Alex Connor				5	4	5	9	7	10	7	7	6	Ret	7	6	9	5	7	7	11	8	Ret	7	7	6	Ret	8	4	4	3		428
3	(Brazil) Roberto Faria	10	5	8	6	DNS	10	8	6	13	8	8	10	9	11	Ret	7	6	11	10	7	10	5	11	11	9	4	7	Ret	Ret	9		397.5
4	(United Kingdom) Joe Turney	6	4	9	4	2	Ret	6	8	8	9	9	4	4	2	Ret																	228
5	(United Kingdom) Alex Walker													10	13	8	11	8	9	8	9	13				Ret	11	Ret					133
6	(United Kingdom) Chris Lulham																									11	7	5					52
Pos	Driver	R1	R2	R3	R1	R2	R3	R1	R2	R3	R1	R2	R3	R1	R2	R3	R1	R2	R3	R1	R2	R3	R1	R2	R3	R1	R2	R3	R1	R2	R3	Pen.	Pts
Pos	Driver	BHI			DON			THR1			CRO^{†}			OUL			SNE			THR2			KNO			SIL			BHGP			Pen.	Pts

=== Teams Cup ===
Each team nominated two drivers to score points before every round. All non-nominated drivers were ignored.

Pos	Team	Pts
1	Double R Racing	536
2	Carlin	439
3	JHR Developments	407
4	TRS Arden Junior Team	344.5
5	Richardson Racing	174
6	Fortec Motorsport	145
