= 2021 F3 Asian Championship =

Motor racing competition

The 2021 F3 Asian Championship was a multi-event, Formula 3 open-wheel single seater motor racing championship. The championship featured a mix of professional and amateur drivers, competing in Formula 3 cars that conform to the FIA Formula 3 regulations for the championship. This was the fourth season of the championship and was won by Guanyu Zhou for Abu Dhabi Racing by Prema.

The season consisted of five consecutive weekends in January and February 2021.

== Teams and drivers ==
Team	No.	Drivers	Status	Rounds
(Republic of Ireland) Pinnacle Motorsport	3	(France) Pierre-Louis Chovet		All
(Republic of Ireland) Pinnacle Motorsport	10	(Italy) Alessio Deledda		All
(Republic of Ireland) Pinnacle Motorsport	25	(France) Alexandre Bardinon		All
(Republic of Ireland) Pinnacle Motorsport	40	(Germany) Matthias Lüthen		1–3
(Australia) Evans GP	4	(Finland) Patrik Pasma		All
(Australia) Evans GP	5	(United Kingdom) Casper Stevenson	R	1–2
(Australia) Evans GP	5	(United Kingdom) Alex Connor	R	4–5
(Australia) Evans GP	6	(France) Isack Hadjar	R	1–3
(Australia) Evans GP	51	(Russia) Irina Sidorkova	R	1–2, 4–5
(Jordan) Motorscape	7	(Brazil) Roberto Faria (Note: Faria is a Brazilian driver racing under a British licence.)	R	All
(Jordan) Motorscape	77	(Italy) Nicola Marinangeli		All
(Hong Kong) BlackArts Racing	8	(Mexico) Rafael Villagómez	R	All
(Hong Kong) BlackArts Racing	62	(Spain) Lorenzo Fluxá	R	All
(Hong Kong) BlackArts Racing	66	(Portugal) Zdeněk Chovanec (Note: Chovanec is a Czech-Venezuelan-Portuguese driver racing under a Portuguese licence.)		1
(Hong Kong) BlackArts Racing	74	(Turkey) Cem Bölükbaşı	R	All
(United Kingdom) Hitech Grand Prix	11	(Czech Republic) Roman Staněk		All
(United Kingdom) Hitech Grand Prix	12	(Japan) Ayumu Iwasa	R	All
(United Kingdom) Hitech Grand Prix	13	(United Kingdom) Reece Ushijima (Note: Ushijima is a Japanese-American driver racing under a British licence.)	R	All
(United Kingdom) Hitech Grand Prix	14	(Israel) Roy Nissany		All
(United Arab Emirates) Abu Dhabi Racing by Prema	16	(Sweden) Dino Beganovic	R	1–3
(United Arab Emirates) Abu Dhabi Racing by Prema	16	(Spain) David Vidales		4–5
(United Arab Emirates) Abu Dhabi Racing by Prema	33	(China) Guanyu Zhou		All
(United Arab Emirates) Abu Dhabi Racing by Prema	88	(United Arab Emirates) Amna Al Qubaisi	R	All
(United Arab Emirates) Abu Dhabi Racing by Prema	99	(United Arab Emirates) Khaled Al Qubaisi		4–5
(India) Mumbai Falcons	19	(India) Jehan Daruvala		All
(India) Mumbai Falcons	28	(India) Kush Maini		All

- Manaf Hijjawi was set to compete with Motorscape but did not appear at any rounds due to an injury.
- Alister Yoong was set to compete with BlackArts Racing but only appeared in practice sessions.

== Race calendar ==
The first proposal for the race calendar was announced on 23 September 2020. To combat possible travel and quarantine regulations because of the COVID-19 pandemic, the season consisted only of races in the United Arab Emirates. This calendar was slightly amended later on. The grid for Race 2 was determined by the fastest laps of Race 1.

Round		Circuit	Date	Pole position	Fastest lap	Winning driver	Winning team	Rookie winner	Supporting
1	R1	Dubai Autodrome (International Circuit)	29 January	(China) Guanyu Zhou	(China) Guanyu Zhou	(China) Guanyu Zhou	(United Arab Emirates) Abu Dhabi Racing by Prema	(Sweden) Dino Beganovic	Formula 4 UAE Championship; Waleed Alshemais National Sportsbike Championship; Gulf Radical Cup; UAE Touring Car Championship
1	R2	Dubai Autodrome (International Circuit)	30 January		(China) Guanyu Zhou	(China) Guanyu Zhou	(United Arab Emirates) Abu Dhabi Racing by Prema	(Sweden) Dino Beganovic	Formula 4 UAE Championship; Waleed Alshemais National Sportsbike Championship; Gulf Radical Cup; UAE Touring Car Championship
1	R3	Dubai Autodrome (International Circuit)	30 January	(France) Pierre-Louis Chovet	(India) Jehan Daruvala	(France) Pierre-Louis Chovet	(Republic of Ireland) Pinnacle Motorsport	(Sweden) Dino Beganovic	Formula 4 UAE Championship; Waleed Alshemais National Sportsbike Championship; Gulf Radical Cup; UAE Touring Car Championship
2	R1	Yas Marina Circuit (Corkscrew Circuit)	4 February	(India) Jehan Daruvala	(India) Jehan Daruvala	(India) Jehan Daruvala	Mumbai Falcons India Racing Ltd.	(France) Isack Hadjar	Formula 4 UAE Championship
2	R2	Yas Marina Circuit (Corkscrew Circuit)	5 February		(India) Jehan Daruvala	(India) Jehan Daruvala	Mumbai Falcons India Racing Ltd.	(France) Isack Hadjar	Formula 4 UAE Championship
2	R3	Yas Marina Circuit (Corkscrew Circuit)	5 February	(France) Pierre-Louis Chovet	(France) Pierre-Louis Chovet	(France) Pierre-Louis Chovet	(Republic of Ireland) Pinnacle Motorsport	(France) Isack Hadjar	Formula 4 UAE Championship
3	R1	Yas Marina Circuit (Corkscrew Circuit)	6 February	(India) Jehan Daruvala	(France) Pierre-Louis Chovet	(France) Pierre-Louis Chovet	(Republic of Ireland) Pinnacle Motorsport	(Sweden) Dino Beganovic	Formula 4 UAE Championship
3	R2	Yas Marina Circuit (Corkscrew Circuit)	7 February		(China) Guanyu Zhou	(France) Pierre-Louis Chovet	(Republic of Ireland) Pinnacle Motorsport	(Sweden) Dino Beganovic	Formula 4 UAE Championship
3	R3	Yas Marina Circuit (Corkscrew Circuit)	7 February	(India) Jehan Daruvala	(France) Isack Hadjar	(India) Jehan Daruvala	Mumbai Falcons India Racing Ltd.	(France) Isack Hadjar	Formula 4 UAE Championship
4	R1	Dubai Autodrome (Grand Prix Circuit)	12 February	(China) Guanyu Zhou	(India) Kush Maini	(France) Pierre-Louis Chovet	(Republic of Ireland) Pinnacle Motorsport	(Japan) Ayumu Iwasa	Formula 4 UAE Championship; Waleed Alshemais National Sportsbike Championship; Gulf Radical Cup; Asian Le Mans Series
4	R2	Dubai Autodrome (Grand Prix Circuit)	13 February		(India) Kush Maini	(Finland) Patrik Pasma	(Australia) Evans GP	(United Kingdom) Reece Ushijima	Formula 4 UAE Championship; Waleed Alshemais National Sportsbike Championship; Gulf Radical Cup; Asian Le Mans Series
4	R3	Dubai Autodrome (Grand Prix Circuit)	14 February	(China) Guanyu Zhou	(France) Pierre-Louis Chovet	(France) Pierre-Louis Chovet	(Republic of Ireland) Pinnacle Motorsport	(United Kingdom) Reece Ushijima	Formula 4 UAE Championship; Waleed Alshemais National Sportsbike Championship; Gulf Radical Cup; Asian Le Mans Series
5	R1	Yas Marina Circuit (Grand Prix Circuit)	19 February	(China) Guanyu Zhou	(China) Guanyu Zhou	(China) Guanyu Zhou (Note: Patrik Pasma crossed the line in first place but later received a time penalty due to not slowing down during a yellow flag.)	(United Arab Emirates) Abu Dhabi Racing by Prema	(Turkey) Cem Bölükbaşı	Asian Le Mans Series; UAE Touring Car Championship
5	R2	Yas Marina Circuit (Grand Prix Circuit)	20 February		(Finland) Patrik Pasma	(Finland) Patrik Pasma	(Australia) Evans GP	(Turkey) Cem Bölükbaşı	Asian Le Mans Series; UAE Touring Car Championship
5	R3	Yas Marina Circuit (Grand Prix Circuit)	20 February	(China) Guanyu Zhou	(China) Guanyu Zhou	(China) Guanyu Zhou	(United Arab Emirates) Abu Dhabi Racing by Prema	(Japan) Ayumu Iwasa	Asian Le Mans Series; UAE Touring Car Championship

== Championship standings ==
=== Scoring system ===
Points were awarded to the top ten drivers.

Position	**1st**	**2nd**	**3rd**	**4th**	**5th**	**6th**	**7th**	**8th**	**9th**	**10th**
Points	25	18	15	12	10	8	6	4	2	1

=== Drivers' Championship ===
Pos	Driver	DUB1 (United Arab Emirates)			ABU1 (United Arab Emirates)			ABU2 (United Arab Emirates)			DUB2 (United Arab Emirates)			ABU3 (United Arab Emirates)			Pts
Pos	Driver	R1	R2	R3	R1	R2	R3	R1	R2	R3	R1	R2	R3	R1	R2	R3	Pts
1	(China) Guanyu Zhou	**1**	1	Ret	2	4	5	3	2	2	**2**	2	**4**	**1**	2	**1**	257
2	(France) Pierre-Louis Chovet	4	4	**1**	5	5	**1**	1	1	4	1	3	1	5	Ret	5	241
3	(India) Jehan Daruvala	3	7	7	**1**	1	2	**2**	6	**1**	5	12	Ret	7	3	3	192
4	(Finland) Patrik Pasma	9	10	11	4	6	11	Ret	Ret	5	4	1	3	2	1	2	146
5	(Israel) Roy Nissany	2	8	3	7	8	7	5	Ret	11	8	Ret	7	4	7	6	99
6	(France) Isack Hadjar	8	3	4	3	2	3	10	Ret	3							95
7	(Sweden) Dino Beganovic	5	2	2	Ret	3	15	4	3	Ret							88
8	(Japan) Ayumu Iwasa	6	5	5	9	10	4	6	10	7	3	Ret	10	10	10	7	82
9	(Turkey) Cem Bölükbaşı	7	9	8	8	7	10	7	5	Ret	7	8	12	9	6	9	61
10	(Czech Republic) Roman Staněk	12	12	Ret	6	9	8	9	8	6	6	4	11	18†	Ret	4	60
11	(India) Kush Maini	21	DNS	20	12	11	17	8	7	8	NC	Ret	5	3	4	8	55
12	(United Kingdom) Reece Ushijima	10	11	6	10	13	6	12	11	10	10	5	6	8	9	10	45
13	(Spain) David Vidales										9	11	2	6	5	12	38
14	(Spain) Lorenzo Fluxá	14	14	10	11	21	13	Ret	4	9	13	7	14	Ret	8	13	25
15	(Italy) Alessio Deledda	13	6	13	22	15	Ret	16	13	15	17	10	16	13	13	Ret	9
16	(United Kingdom) Alex Connor										11	6	13	17†	Ret	11	8
17	(Mexico) Rafael Villagómez	Ret	Ret	12	20	19	14	Ret	12	12	12	9	8	11	14	14	6
18	(Brazil) Roberto Faria	11	15	19	16	20	9	11	9	17	16	Ret	9	Ret	11	Ret	6
19	(Portugal) Zdeněk Chovanec	DNS	18	9													2
20	(France) Alexandre Bardinon	18	17	Ret	15	12	12	14	Ret	13	Ret	13	Ret	Ret	17	Ret	0
21	(Italy) Nicola Marinangeli	15	13	14	14	14	Ret	13	Ret	14	14	16	15	12	15	18	0
22	(Russia) Irina Sidorkova	19	19	15	19	18	Ret				15	14	17	14	12	16	0
23	(United Kingdom) Casper Stevenson	17	16	16	13	Ret	Ret										0
24	(United Arab Emirates) Amna Al Qubaisi	16	Ret	18	17	17	16	15	14	Ret	18	Ret	Ret	16	18	15	0
25	(United Arab Emirates) Khaled Al Qubaisi										19	15	18	15	16	17	0
26	(Germany) Matthias Lüthen	20	20	17	18	16	18	17	Ret	16							0
Pos	Driver	R1	R2	R3	R1	R2	R3	R1	R2	R3	R1	R2	R3	R1	R2	R3	Pts
Pos	Driver	DUB1 (United Arab Emirates)			ABU1 (United Arab Emirates)			ABU2 (United Arab Emirates)			DUB2 (United Arab Emirates)			ABU3 (United Arab Emirates)			Pts

Colour	Result
Gold	Winner
Silver	Second place
Bronze	Third place
Green	Points classification
Blue	Non-points classification
Blue	Non-classified finish (NC)
Purple	Retired, not classified (Ret)
Red	Did not qualify (DNQ)
Red	Did not pre-qualify (DNPQ)
Black	Disqualified (DSQ)
White	Did not start (DNS)
White	Withdrew (WD)
White	Race cancelled (C)
Blank	Did not practice (DNP)
Blank	Did not arrive (DNA)
Blank	Excluded (EX)

**Bold** – Pole
Italics – Fastest Lap

=== Rookie Cup ===
Pos	Driver	DUB1 (United Arab Emirates)			ABU1 (United Arab Emirates)			ABU2 (United Arab Emirates)			DUB2 (United Arab Emirates)			ABU3 (United Arab Emirates)			Pts
Pos	Driver	R1	R2	R3	R1	R2	R3	R1	R2	R3	R1	R2	R3	R1	R2	R3	Pts
1	(Japan) Ayumu Iwasa	6	5	5	9	10	4	6	10	7	3	Ret	10	10	11	7	226
2	(Turkey) Cem Bölükbaşı	7	9	8	8	7	10	7	5	Ret	7	8	12	8	6	9	218
3	(United Kingdom) Reece Ushijima	10	11	6	10	13	6	12	11	10	10	5	6	9	9	10	211
4	(France) Isack Hadjar	8	3	4	3	2	3	10	Ret	3							160
5	(Sweden) Dino Beganovic	5	2	2	Ret	3	15	4	3	Ret							147
6	(Spain) Lorenzo Fluxá	14	14	10	11	21	13	Ret	4	9	13	7	14	Ret	10	13	125
7	(Brazil) Roberto Faria	11	15	19	16	20	9	11	9	17	16	Ret	9	Ret	8	Ret	101
8	(Mexico) Rafael Villagómez	Ret	Ret	12	20	19	14	Ret	12	12	12	9	8	11	14	14	97
9	(United Kingdom) Alex Connor										11	6	13	17	Ret	11	56
10	(Russia) Irina Sidorkova	19	19	15	19	18	Ret				15	14	17	14	12	16	55
11	(United Arab Emirates) Amna Al Qubaisi	16	Ret	18	17	17	16	15	14	Ret	18	Ret	Ret	16	18	15	49
12	(United Kingdom) Casper Stevenson	17	16	16	13	Ret	Ret										16
Pos	Driver	R1	R2	R3	R1	R2	R3	R1	R2	R3	R1	R2	R3	R1	R2	R3	Pts
Pos	Driver	DUB1 (United Arab Emirates)			ABU1 (United Arab Emirates)			ABU2 (United Arab Emirates)			DUB2 (United Arab Emirates)			ABU3 (United Arab Emirates)			Pts

=== Teams Championship ===
Ahead of each event, the teams nominated two drivers that accumulate teams' points.

Pos	Team	Pts
1	(United Arab Emirates) Abu Dhabi Racing by Prema	383
2	(Australia) Evans GP	249
3	Mumbai Falcons India Racing Ltd.	247
4	(Republic of Ireland) Pinnacle Motorsport	241
5	(United Kingdom) Hitech Grand Prix	152
6	(Hong Kong) BlackArts Racing	82
7	(Jordan) Motorscape	6
