= 2022 Euroformula Open Championship =

2022 formula racing championship

The 2022 Euroformula Open Championship was a multi-event motor racing championship for single-seater open wheel formula racing cars held across Europe. The championship featured drivers competing in Euroformula Open Championship specification Dallara 320 chassis cars. It was the ninth Euroformula Open Championship season.

Oliver Goethe, driving for Team Motopark, took the drivers' championship at Barcelona. Vladislav Lomko came second and won the rookie championship, while his team CryptoTower Racing clinched its second teams' title.

== Teams and drivers ==
All teams utilized the Dallara 320 chassis.

Team	Engine	No.	Driver	Status	Rounds
(Czech Republic) Effective Racing	Mercedes-Benz	7	(Czech Republic) Vladimír Netušil		2–9
(Spain) Drivex School	Mercedes-Benz	12	(United Kingdom) Ayrton Simmons		5–7, 9
(Spain) Drivex School	Mercedes-Benz	63	(Hungary) Benjámin Berta		5
(Spain) Drivex School	Mercedes-Benz	63	(Spain) Daniel Nogales	R	7
(Spain) Drivex School	Mercedes-Benz	67	(Chile) Nico Pino		1–4
(Spain) Drivex School	Mercedes-Benz	68	(Australia) Alex Peroni		1
(Netherlands) Van Amersfoort Racing	Mercedes-Benz	14	(Romania) Filip Ugran		1–4
(Netherlands) Van Amersfoort Racing	Mercedes-Benz	22	(Italy) Nicola Marinangeli		1–3
(Netherlands) Van Amersfoort Racing	Mercedes-Benz	25	(Denmark) Sebastian Øgaard	R	1–4
(Netherlands) Van Amersfoort Racing	Mercedes-Benz	88	(Poland) Filip Kaminiarz		4
(Japan) CryptoTower Racing	Volkswagen	21	(United Kingdom) Josh Mason		All
(Japan) CryptoTower Racing	Volkswagen	69	(France) Vladislav Lomko (Note: Lomko is Russian, but he competes under a French licence as Russian national emblems were banned by the FIA following the Russian invasion of Ukraine.)	R	All
(Japan) CryptoTower Racing	Volkswagen	71	(Australia) Christian Mansell		All
(Germany) Team Motopark	Volkswagen	24	(Mexico) Alex García	R	All
(Germany) Team Motopark	Volkswagen	78	(United Kingdom) Frederick Lubin		All
(Germany) Team Motopark	Volkswagen	96	(Denmark) Oliver Goethe		All
(Italy) BVM Racing	Volkswagen	84	(Italy) Francesco Simonazzi	R	All
(Serbia) NV Racing	Volkswagen	212	(Serbia) Paolo Brajnik		6

== Race calendar ==
A provisional eight-round calendar was announced at the penultimate round of the 2021 championship, on 24 September 2021. On 30 November 2021, the calendar changed: Imola remained on the calendar instead of Mugello, Estoril replaced Portimao, and the Pau Grand Prix returned to the calendar after a two-year hiatus; featuring two instead of the usual three races.

Round		Circuit	Date	Pole position	Fastest lap	Most positions gained	Winning driver	Winning team	Rookie winner
1	R1	(Portugal) Circuito do Estoril	30 April	(Denmark) Oliver Goethe	(Denmark) Oliver Goethe	(Australia) Alex Peroni	(Australia) Christian Mansell	(Japan) CryptoTower Racing	(France) Vladislav Lomko
1	R2	(Portugal) Circuito do Estoril	1 May		(Denmark) Oliver Goethe	(Romania) Filip Ugran	(Denmark) Oliver Goethe	(Germany) Team Motopark	(Denmark) Sebastian Øgaard
1	R3	(Portugal) Circuito do Estoril	1 May		(Romania) Filip Ugran	(Italy) Nicola Marinangeli	(Denmark) Sebastian Øgaard	(Netherlands) Van Amersfoort Racing	(Denmark) Sebastian Øgaard
2	R1	(France) Circuit de Pau-Ville	7 May	(Denmark) Oliver Goethe	(Denmark) Oliver Goethe	(Italy) Francesco Simonazzi	(Denmark) Oliver Goethe	(Germany) Team Motopark	(France) Vladislav Lomko
2	R2	(France) Circuit de Pau-Ville	8 May	(Denmark) Oliver Goethe	(Denmark) Oliver Goethe	(Italy) Nicola Marinangeli	(France) Vladislav Lomko	(Japan) CryptoTower Racing	(France) Vladislav Lomko
3	R1	(France) Circuit Paul Ricard	21 May	(Australia) Christian Mansell	(France) Vladislav Lomko	(Italy) Nicola Marinangeli	(Denmark) Oliver Goethe	(Germany) Team Motopark	(France) Vladislav Lomko
3	R2	(France) Circuit Paul Ricard	22 May		(Denmark) Oliver Goethe	(United Kingdom) Josh Mason	(Australia) Christian Mansell	(Japan) CryptoTower Racing	(France) Vladislav Lomko
3	R3	(France) Circuit Paul Ricard	22 May		(Denmark) Oliver Goethe	(Denmark) Oliver Goethe	(Denmark) Oliver Goethe	(Germany) Team Motopark	(France) Vladislav Lomko
4	R1	(Belgium) Circuit de Spa-Francorchamps	18 June	(Denmark) Oliver Goethe	(Denmark) Oliver Goethe	(United Kingdom) Josh Mason	(Denmark) Oliver Goethe	(Germany) Team Motopark	(France) Vladislav Lomko
4	R2	(Belgium) Circuit de Spa-Francorchamps	19 June		(Denmark) Oliver Goethe	(Denmark) Oliver Goethe	(Denmark) Oliver Goethe	(Germany) Team Motopark	(France) Vladislav Lomko
4	R3	(Belgium) Circuit de Spa-Francorchamps	19 June		(Australia) Christian Mansell	(Denmark) Oliver Goethe	(Denmark) Oliver Goethe	(Germany) Team Motopark	(France) Vladislav Lomko
5	R1	(Hungary) Hungaroring	9 July	(France) Vladislav Lomko	(Denmark) Oliver Goethe	(Denmark) Oliver Goethe	(Denmark) Oliver Goethe	(Germany) Team Motopark	(France) Vladislav Lomko
5	R2	(Hungary) Hungaroring	10 July		(Australia) Christian Mansell	(Denmark) Oliver Goethe	(United Kingdom) Josh Mason	(Japan) CryptoTower Racing	(France) Vladislav Lomko
5	R3	(Hungary) Hungaroring	10 July		(United Kingdom) Ayrton Simmons	(Italy) Francesco Simonazzi	(Australia) Christian Mansell	(Japan) CryptoTower Racing	(Italy) Francesco Simonazzi
6	R1	(Italy) Imola Circuit	3 September	(Denmark) Oliver Goethe	(Denmark) Oliver Goethe	not awarded	(Denmark) Oliver Goethe	(Germany) Team Motopark	(France) Vladislav Lomko
6	R2	(Italy) Imola Circuit	4 September		(Italy) Francesco Simonazzi	(Denmark) Oliver Goethe	(France) Vladislav Lomko	(Japan) CryptoTower Racing	(France) Vladislav Lomko
6	R3	(Italy) Imola Circuit	4 September		(United Kingdom) Josh Mason	(Australia) Christian Mansell	(United Kingdom) Josh Mason	(Japan) CryptoTower Racing	(France) Vladislav Lomko
7	R1	(Austria) Red Bull Ring	10 September	(Denmark) Oliver Goethe	(Denmark) Oliver Goethe	(Australia) Christian Mansell	(Denmark) Oliver Goethe	(Germany) Team Motopark	(France) Vladislav Lomko
7	R2	(Austria) Red Bull Ring	11 September		(France) Vladislav Lomko	(Italy) Francesco Simonazzi	(France) Vladislav Lomko	(Japan) CryptoTower Racing	(France) Vladislav Lomko
7	R3	(Austria) Red Bull Ring	11 September		(France) Vladislav Lomko	(France) Vladislav Lomko	(Italy) Francesco Simonazzi	(Italy) BVM Racing	(Italy) Francesco Simonazzi
8	R1	(Italy) Autodromo Nazionale di Monza	24 September	(France) Vladislav Lomko	(France) Vladislav Lomko	(United Kingdom) Frederick Lubin	(France) Vladislav Lomko	(Japan) CryptoTower Racing	(France) Vladislav Lomko
8	R2	(Italy) Autodromo Nazionale di Monza	25 September		(Australia) Christian Mansell	(Mexico) Alex García	(United Kingdom) Josh Mason	(Japan) CryptoTower Racing	(France) Vladislav Lomko
8	R3	(Italy) Autodromo Nazionale di Monza	25 September		(United Kingdom) Frederick Lubin	(France) Vladislav Lomko	(France) Vladislav Lomko	(Japan) CryptoTower Racing	(France) Vladislav Lomko
9	R1	(Spain) Circuit de Barcelona-Catalunya	15 October	(Denmark) Oliver Goethe	(Denmark) Oliver Goethe	(United Kingdom) Ayrton Simmons	(Denmark) Oliver Goethe	(Germany) Team Motopark	(Italy) Francesco Simonazzi
9	R2	(Spain) Circuit de Barcelona-Catalunya	16 October		(France) Vladislav Lomko	(United Kingdom) Josh Mason	(France) Vladislav Lomko	(Japan) CryptoTower Racing	(France) Vladislav Lomko
9	R3	(Spain) Circuit de Barcelona-Catalunya	16 October		(United Kingdom) Frederick Lubin	(Denmark) Oliver Goethe	(United Kingdom) Frederick Lubin	(Germany) Team Motopark	(France) Vladislav Lomko

== Season report ==
=== Opening rounds ===
The ninth Euroformula Open season began at Circuito do Estoril with Oliver Goethe taking pole position. The front duo both had bad starts, allowing Christian Mansell to take the lead. Behind him, Vladislav Lomko soon overtook Sebastian Øgaard for second, before Goethe followed through, salvaging a podium in the end after having dropped as low as eighth place during the race. Alex Peroni started race two from pole, while Goethe had a bad start again and had to climb up the order. At half distance, he overtook Øgaard and Frederick Lubin and started closing up on Peroni. The pair made contact while fighting, with Peroni dropping to fourth. Goethe was handed a penalty, but had a big enough margin to still win. The last race was won by Øgaard, who led from lights to flag, resisting attacks from Lubin and eventually coming out 0.1 seconds ahead. Third was Mansell, who overtook Lomko at the start to achieve his second podium. Goethe's fourth place earned him the championship lead, three points from Øgaard.

Next up was the return of Circuit de Pau-Ville, and Goethe won pole for both races. The Saturday race saw the polesitter pull away and Mansell in third overtake Lomko to gain second. Nicola Marinangeli was the first to crash around the narrow track, bringing out a safety car around the halfway point. Following the restart, the gaps between the drivers began to grow again, before Lubin and Nico Pino collided into turn one on the last lap, leaving the leading trio untouched. Sunday's race was the Pau Grand Prix, and this time Lomko had a better start. He quickly passed poleman Goethe, before Mansell, Josh Mason and Filip Ugran followed him through. The leading duo began pulling away and Lomko looked to have the race under control. Goethe had climb back up the order; a great overtake on Ugran and Mason crashing out saw him finish in third at the end. A win and a podium helped Goethe extend his championship lead to 19 points over Mansell, with Øgaard's anonymous weekend dropping him to fourth.

Two weeks later, Circuit Paul Ricard hosted round three and Mansell was fastest in qualifying. Goethe started race one alongside him and was promoted to the lead when Mansell got hit and spun around by Øgaard. From then on, Goethe led Lomko and Ugran to the finish, while Mansell was able to salvage fourth place. Race two had Mansell and Marinangeli battle for the lead all through the first lap, before Marinangeli got attacked by Goethe, allowing Mansell to gap them. Goethe overtook Marinangeli and closed up on the leader, but was not able to pass him. Marinangeli eventually dropped down the field, and Lomko completed the podium. Race three saw a remarkable charge by Goethe. who started fifth, was already in the lead by lap three and then left the field behind him. Mansell had a similar rise, from fourth to second, but was not able to keep up with Goethe. Lomko was third once again. Goethe's two wins and one second place grew his championship advantage over Mansell to 35 points.

=== Mid-season rounds ===
The championship went to Spa-Francorchamps next, and this time Goethe was back on top for qualifying. Mansell started race one in third and overtook Ugran and Goethe into La Source, before Goethe used the slipstream down Kemmel Straight to retake the lead. He did not look back and won the race. Mansell remained in second, resisting pressure from Mason in third. Øgaard started race two from pole, but the big movers were once again Mansell, who was into the lead from fourth by lap two, and Goethe, who was second two laps later. A few laps of battling for the lead ended with Goethe once again driving past and away. Third was Lomko, benefitting from multiple penalties for Mason. Race three saw Goethe completing a perfect weekend, this time charging up from sixth on the grid. One of his overtakes earned him a time penalty, but in the end his advantage was enough to lead Mason and Lomko home. Three wins plus a handful of bonus points handed Goethe a sizable 66-point margin over Mansell.

The Hungaroring weekend saw the departure of Van Amersfoort Racing, reducing the grid to ten entries. Lomko won qualifying and race one began with a three-car battle for the lead that allowed Goethe past second-placed Lubin. On lap three, Goethe moved past Lomko into the race lead and continued on to his fifth straight win. Ayrton Simmons was on pole alongside Mason for race two, and his slow start allowed Mason to take a lead he would not relinquish afterwards. Mansell also overtook Simmons, but was not able to close up to Mason. Simmons remained in third and took his maiden podium. Race three began with three cars stalling, with polesitter Simmons one of them, so Mansell inherited the lead. Goethe behind him could not get past, but Mansell had to fight off Francesco Simonazzi, who had surged up from seventh. He could not find a way by, but still earned his first podium in car racing. Both championship contestants won a race, and the gap remained steady at 69 points.

Only eight cars were on the grid in Imola, where Goethe was back in qualifying form and took pole. The first race saw no change in the top three on the grid, with Goethe, Lomko and Mansell all finishing where they started. Goethe was put under investigation for driving standards, but no further action was taken. Race two was more eventful, as right at the start a three-wide moment sent Mansell into the gravel and to the back. That gave Lomko second place, and when polesitter Mason had to pit for damage, Lomko was in the lead. Fights behind him ended Alex García's race and meant Lomko could pull out a gap and finish first, ahead of Lubin and Goethe. Mason was on pole again for the last race and this time, he made no mistakes. He held off Lubin at the start and when the latter was overtaken by Mansell, Mason did the same against the Australian to win. Goethe's ninth win of the season meant he outscored Mansell again, albeit only by six points, growing his advantage to 75 points.

=== Closing rounds ===
Goethe showed his one-lap pace again at the Red Bull Ring and took another pole position. Race one was wet and wheelspin for Goethe at the start gave Lomko the race lead. He retook it into turn three, and Lomko had to worry about Mansell, who then took second place. Shortly after, the race was red-flagged for a rain shower and ended early. The second race saw Mason force leader Simmons off the track, which enabled Lomko to come through and take the lead. Mason and Lomko both earned penalties for separate offenses, as well as Simonazzi, who came through in the final stages of the race to finish second, ahead of Mason. Simonazzi then started the final race from pole, but was quickly passed by Lubin and Lomko. This order remained until the last lap, where the leaders made contact, giving Lubin a puncture and allowing Simonazzi and Goethe through. The Italian took his and BVM Racing's first ever win. Goethe was now 89 points ahead of Mansell, who had Lomko closing up in third, 17 points behind.

The eighth round of the season in Monza saw Lomko braving the wet conditions to win qualifying. The rest of the field was not able to keep up with him as he pulled away in the wet first race. Lubin passed the slow-starting Mansell off the line to get second, and Goethe had a spin while trying to gain a podium that sent him back to sixth. Race two polesitter Goethe missed the start with a technical issue and had to start a lap down, promoting Mason to the lead who led until the chequered flag. Mansell was in second, before a collision with Simonazzi saw him crash, flip his car on top and slide into the gravel. After the following red flag, Lomko and García came through to round out the podium. Race three was won by Lomko ahead of Mason and Lubin, and Goethe made another mistake to finish fifth. Two wins for Lomko, a rare off weekend for Goethe and two non-scores for Mansell meant the title went to the final round at Barcelona and Lomko overtook Mansell for second in the standings, 63 points behind Goethe.

The season finale was held at Barcelona-Catalunya, and no one could stop Goethe clinching the title. He first took pole in qualifying, started the first race by holding off the rest of the field and then set off to win by a considerable margin ahead of Simonazzi and Mansell. Second in the standings was Lomko, who cemented his place in the standings by winning the second race, which he led from pole while the returning Simmons got by Lubin at the start to finish second. The last race of the year saw Lubin get his first win in the category by overtaking poleman Lomko around the outside of turn one. Champion-elect Goethe completed the podium of a race where only eight cars took to the grid, seven less than the previous low point for a season finale. The departure of Van Amersfoort Racing saw the remaining rounds struggle to reach double-digit entry numbers. With concerns arising around the health and future of the championship at the end of the season, meetings took place to discuss a new series to replace it.

== Championship standings ==
=== Drivers' championship ===
Points were awarded as follows:

Position	1st	2nd	3rd	4th	5th	6th	7th	8th	9th	10th	Pole	FL	PG
Points	25	18	15	12	10	8	6	4	2	1	**1**	1	2*

Each drivers' three worst scores were dropped.

Pos	Driver	EST (Portugal)			PAU (France)		LEC (France)			SPA (Belgium)			HUN (Hungary)			IMO (Italy)			RBR (Austria)			MNZ (Italy)			CAT (Spain)			Pts
Pos	Driver	R1	R2	R3	R1	R2	R1	R2	R3	R1	R2	R3	R1	R2	R3	R1	R2	R3	R1	R2	R3	R1	R2	R3	R1	R2	R3	Pts
1	(Denmark) Oliver Goethe	**3**	1	4	**1**	**3**	1	2	1*	**1**	1*	1*	1*	4*	3	**1**	3*	4	**1**	6	2	6	5	5	**1**	5	3*	473
2	(France) Vladislav Lomko	2	11	5	3	1	2	3	3	4	3	3	**2**	5	5	2	1	5	3	1	3*	**1**	2	1*	6	1	2	416
3	(Australia) Christian Mansell	1	8	3	2	2	**4**	1	2	2	2	4	4	2	1	3	5	2*	2*	5	4	3	Ret	Ret	3	4	4	377
4	(United Kingdom) Frederick Lubin	5	2	2	Ret	8	8	6	4	7	6	6	3	6	4	5	2	3	5	4	7	2*	4†	3	5	3	1	293
5	(United Kingdom) Josh Mason	7	5	8	4	Ret	Ret	4*	7	3*	7	2	5	1	7	6	7	1	4	3	5	5	1	2	9	6*	Ret	278
6	(Italy) Francesco Simonazzi	9	6	9	8*	Ret	9	11	10	9	10	8	7	7	2*	4	4	6	7	2*	1	4	7	7	2	8	6	197
7	(Mexico) Alex García	11	10	12	6	9	Ret	7	9	5	4	9†	9	8	8	7	Ret	7	Ret	Ret	Ret	Ret	3*	4	7	7	5	116
8	(Denmark) Sebastian Øgaard	4	3	1	7	6	5	8	5	6	5	7																114
9	(Romania) Filip Ugran	Ret	7*	7	5	4	3	5	6	8	8	5																92
10	(United Kingdom) Ayrton Simmons												6	3	10	WD	WD	WD	6	7	6				4*	2	7†	85
11	(Czech Republic) Vladimír Netušil				9	10	10	10	11	WD	WD	WD	10	10	9	8	6	8	WD	WD	WD	7	6	6	8	WD	WD	51
12	(Italy) Nicola Marinangeli	8	Ret	6*	Ret	7*	6*	9	8																			36
13	(Australia) Alex Peroni	6*	4	10																								23
14	(Chile) Nico Pino	10	9	11	Ret	5	7	Ret	Ret	WD	WD	WD																20
15	(Hungary) Benjámin Berta												8	9	6													14
16	(Spain) Daniel Nogales																		Ret	Ret	8							4
17	(Poland) Filip Kaminiarz									10	9	Ret																3
—	(Serbia) Paolo Brajnik															WD	WD	WD										—
Pos	Driver	R1	R2	R3	R1	R2	R1	R2	R3	R1	R2	R3	R1	R2	R3	R1	R2	R3	R1	R2	R3	R1	R2	R3	R1	R2	R3	Pts
Pos	Driver	EST (Portugal)			PAU (France)		LEC (France)			SPA (Belgium)			HUN (Hungary)			IMO (Italy)			RBR (Austria)			MNZ (Italy)			CAT (Spain)			Pts

Colour	Result
Gold	Winner
Silver	Second place
Bronze	Third place
Green	Points classification
Blue	Non-points classification
Blue	Non-classified finish (NC)
Purple	Retired, not classified (Ret)
Red	Did not qualify (DNQ)
Red	Did not pre-qualify (DNPQ)
Black	Disqualified (DSQ)
White	Did not start (DNS)
White	Withdrew (WD)
White	Race cancelled (C)
Blank	Did not practice (DNP)
Blank	Did not arrive (DNA)
Blank	Excluded (EX)

**Bold** – Pole position

Italics – Fastest lap

† – Did not finish, but classified

* – Most positions gained

=== Rookies' championship ===
Points were awarded as follows:

1	2	3	4	5
10	8	6	4	3

Each drivers' three worst results were dropped

Pos	Driver	EST (Portugal)			PAU (France)		LEC (France)			SPA (Belgium)			HUN (Hungary)			IMO (Italy)			RBR (Austria)			MNZ (Italy)			CAT (Spain)			Pts
Pos	Driver	R1	R2	R3	R1	R2	R1	R2	R3	R1	R2	R3	R1	R2	R3	R1	R2	R3	R1	R2	R3	R1	R2	R3	R1	R2	R3	Pts
1	(France) Vladislav Lomko	2	11	5	3	1	2	3	3	4	3	3	2	5	5	2	1	5	3	1	3	1	2	1	6	1	2	226
2	(Italy) Francesco Simonazzi	9	6	9	8	Ret	9	11	10	9	10	8	7	7	2	4	4	6	7	2	1	4	4	7	2	8	6	162
3	(Mexico) Alex García	11	10	12	6	9	Ret	7	9	5	4	9†	9	8	8	7	Ret	7	Ret	Ret	Ret	Ret	3	4	7	7	5	130
4	(Denmark) Sebastian Øgaard	4	3	1	7	6	5	8	5	6	5	7																84
5	(Spain) Daniel Nogales																		Ret	Ret	8							6
Pos	Driver	R1	R2	R3	R1	R2	R1	R2	R3	R1	R2	R3	R1	R2	R3	R1	R2	R3	R1	R2	R3	R1	R2	R3	R1	R2	R3	Pts
Pos	Driver	EST (Portugal)			PAU (France)		LEC (France)			SPA (Belgium)			HUN (Hungary)			IMO (Italy)			RBR (Austria)			MNZ (Italy)			CAT (Spain)			Pts

=== Teams' championship ===
Points were awarded as follows:

1	2	3	4	5
10	8	6	4	3

Pos	Team	EST (Portugal)			PAU (France)		LEC (France)			SPA (Belgium)			HUN (Hungary)			IMO (Italy)			RBR (Austria)			MNZ (Italy)			CAT (Spain)			Pts
Pos	Team	R1	R2	R3	R1	R2	R1	R2	R3	R1	R2	R3	R1	R2	R3	R1	R2	R3	R1	R2	R3	R1	R2	R3	R1	R2	R3	Pts
1	(Japan) CryptoTower Racing	1	5	3	2	1	2	1	2	2	2	2	2	1	1	2	1	1	2	1	3	1	1	1	3	1	2	358
1	(Japan) CryptoTower Racing	2	8	5	3	2	4	3	3	3	3	3	4	2	5	3	5	2	3	3	4	3	2	2	6	4	4	358
2	(Germany) Team Motopark	3	1	2	1	3	1	2	1	1	1	1	1	4	3	1	2	3	1	4	2	2	3	3	1	3	1	280
2	(Germany) Team Motopark	5	2	4	6	8	8	6	4	5	4	6	3	6	4	5	3	4	5	6	7	6	5	4	5	5	3	280
3	(Italy) BVM Racing	9	6	9	8	Ret	9	11	10	9	10	8	7	7	2	4	4	6	7	2	1	4	4	7	2	8	6	54
4	(Netherlands) Van Amersfoort Racing	4	3	1	5	4	3	5	5	6	5	5																48
4	(Netherlands) Van Amersfoort Racing	8	7	6	7	6	5	8	6	8	8	7																48
5	(Spain) Drivex School	6	4	10	Ret	5	7	Ret	Ret	WD	WD	WD	6	3	6	WD	WD	WD	6	7	6				4	2	7	25
5	(Spain) Drivex School	10	9	11									8	9	10				Ret	Ret	8							25
6	(Czech Republic) Effective Racing				9	10	10	10	11	WD	WD	WD	10	10	9	8	6	8	WD	WD	WD	7	7	6	8	WD	WD	0
—	(Serbia) NV Racing															WD	WD	WD										—
Pos	Team	R1	R2	R3	R1	R2	R1	R2	R3	R1	R2	R3	R1	R2	R3	R1	R2	R3	R1	R2	R3	R1	R2	R3	R1	R2	R3	Pts
Pos	Team	EST (Portugal)			PAU (France)		LEC (France)			SPA (Belgium)			HUN (Hungary)			IMO (Italy)			RBR (Austria)			MNZ (Italy)			CAT (Spain)			Pts
