= Alex Connor =

British racing driver (born 2004)

- Nationality: (United Kingdom) British
- Born: 11 April 2004 (age 22) United Kingdom

GB3 Championship career
- Debut season: 2021
- Current team: Arden Motorsport
- Car number: 27
- Starts: 33 (33 entries)
- Wins: 0
- Podiums: 4
- Poles: 0
- Fastest laps: 0
- Best finish: 10th in 2022

Previous series
- 2021 2019–2020: F3 Asian Championship; F4 British Championship

Alex Connor (born 11 April 2004) is a British racing driver currently competing in the ADAC GT4 Germany with BWT Mücke Motorsport. He is also a member of the Young Driver Racing Academy. Connor is based in the UAE.

== Career ==
=== Karting ===
Connor started karting in 2013 by competing in the Sodi World Series Junior Cup. In 2016, he became the UAE X30 Cadet Champion.

=== Formula 4 ===
In 2019, Connor made his single-seater debut, competing in the F4 British Championship for the TRS Arden Junior Team from the second round onwards as he still young at the time of the season opening round. He finished the season in ninth after taking double pole position and his first podium in the final round of the season at Brands Hatch. He also became vice-champion of the Rookie Cup. At the end of the year, Connor contested the Trophy round of the Formula 4 UAE Championship, which supported the 2019 Abu Dhabi Grand Prix, for Xcel Motorsport. After finishing the first race in third place he took victory in the second race.

In 2020, Connor remained in the F4 British Championship with the TRS Arden Junior Team. After taking victory in the opening race of the season at Donington Park, he took two further wins throughout the season to finish fourth in the drivers' standings.

=== F3 Asian Championship ===
In 2021, Connor joined Evans GP to compete in the two final rounds of the F3 Asian Championship. He finished the season in sixteenth.

=== GB3 Championship ===
In 2021, Connor also joined the GB3 Championship with Arden Motorsport. He took three podiums after only competing in the first three rounds.

In 2022, Connor remained in the GB3 Championship with the same team. He finished the season in tenth after taking his only podium of the season in the final race at Donington Park.

=== Sports car racing ===
In 2022, Connor also made his debut in sports car racing by competing in some rounds of the Praga Cup with Arden by Idola Motorsport. He competed in the first round at Silverstone Circuit, where he won the opening race as a guest driver. Later in the season, he also competed in the round at the Donington Park National Circuit where he took a third place.

In 2023, Connor joined BWT Mücke Motorsport together with Emil Gjerdrum to compete in the ADAC GT4 Germany. The pair finished the season in 19th.

== Racing record ==
=== Racing career summary ===
Season	Series	Team	Races	Wins	Poles	F/Laps	Podiums	Points	Position
2019	F4 British Championship	TRS Arden Junior Team	27	0	2	0	1	163	9th
2019	Formula 4 UAE Championship - Trophy Round	Xcel Motorsport	2	1	0	0	2	N/A	NC
2020	F4 British Championship	TRS Arden Junior Team	26	3	2	3	8	265	4th
2021	GB3 Championship	Arden Motorsport	9	0	0	0	3	138	15th
2021	F3 Asian Championship	Evans GP	6	0	0	0	0	8	16th
2022	GB3 Championship	Arden Motorsport	24	0	0	0	1	252.5	10th
2022	Praga Cup	Arden by Idola	4	1	0	0	2	40	17th
2023	ADAC GT4 Germany	BWT Mücke Motorsport	8	0	0	0	0	30	19th
2024	GT4 Winter Series	CV Performance Group	6	0	0	0	0	30	19th
2024	ADAC GT4 Germany	CV Performance Group							
2024	Nürburgring Langstrecken-Serie - VT2-FWD	Walkenhorst Motorsport							
2025	ADAC GT4 Germany	BWT Mücke Motorsport	4	0	0	0	0	16	25th
2026	ADAC GT4 Germany	BWT Mücke Motorsport	11	0	0	0	0	57	12th

* Season still in progress.

=== Complete F4 British Championship results ===
(key) (Races in bold indicate pole position) (Races in italics indicate fastest lap)

Year	Team	1	2	3	4	5	6	7	8	9	10	11	12	13	14	15	16	17	18	19	20	21	22	23	24	25	26	27	28	29	30	DC	Points
2019	TRS Arden Junior Team	BHI; 1	BHI; 2	BHI; 3	DON; 1; 5	DON; 2; 4	DON; 3; 5	THR1; 1; 9	THR1; 2; 7	THR1; 3; 10	CRO; 1; 7	CRO; 2; 7	CRO; 3; 6	OUL; 1 Ret	OUL; 2; 7	OUL; 3; 6	SNE; 1; 9	SNE; 2; 5	SNE; 3; 7	THR2; 1; 7	THR2; 2; 11	THR2; 3; 8	KNO; 1 Ret	KNO; 2; 7	KNO; 3; 7	SIL; 1; 6	SIL; 2 Ret	SIL; 3; 8	**BHGP**; **1**; 4	BHGP; 2; 4	**BHGP**; **3**; 3	9th	163
2020	TRS Arden Junior Team	DON; 1; 1	DON; 2 Ret	DON; 3; 8	BHGP; 1; 3	BHGP; 2; 5	BHGP; 3; 3	OUL; 1; 5	OUL; 2 Ret	OUL; 3; 5	KNO; 1; 2	KNO; 2; 3	KNO; 3; 4	THR; 1; 4	THR; 2 Ret	THR; 3; 4	**SIL**; **1**; 1	SIL; 2; 6	**SIL**; **3**; 2	CRO; 1; 7	CRO; 2 Ret	SNE; 1; 8	SNE; 2; 6	SNE; 3; 5	BHI; 1; 5	BHI; 2; 1	BHI; 3; 8					4th	265

=== Complete F3 Asian Championship results ===
(key) (Races in bold indicate pole position) (Races in italics indicate fastest lap)

Year	Entrant	1	2	3	4	5	6	7	8	9	10	11	12	13	14	15	DC	Points
2021	Evans GP	DUB; 1	DUB; 2	DUB; 3	ABU; 1	ABU; 2	ABU; 3	ABU; 1	ABU; 2	ABU; 3	DUB; 1; 11	DUB; 2; 6	DUB; 3; 13	ABU; 1; 17†	ABU; 2 Ret	ABU; 2; 11	16th	8

=== Complete GB3 Championship results ===
(key) (Races in bold indicate pole position) (Races in italics indicate fastest lap)

Year	Entrant	1	2	3	4	5	6	7	8	9	10	11	12	13	14	15	16	17	18	19	20	21	22	23	24	DC	Points
2021	Arden Motorsport	BRH; 1; 7	BRH; 2; 5	BRH; 3; 14	SIL; 1; 7	SIL; 2; 9	SIL; 3; 2^{5}	DON1; 1; 3	DON1; 2; 2	DON1; 3 Ret	SPA; 1	SPA; 2	SPA; 3	SNE; 1	SNE; 2	SNE; 3	SIL2; 1	SIL2; 2	SIL2; 3	OUL; 1	OUL; 2	OUL; 3	DON2; 1	DON2; 2	DON2; 3	15th	138
2022	Arden Motorsport	OUL; 1; 15	OUL; 2; 13	OUL; 3; 18^{2}	SIL1; 1; 11	SIL1; 2; 10	SIL1; 3; 7^{1}	DON1; 1; 4	DON1; 2; 9	DON1; 3; 8^{9}	SNE; 1; 8	SNE; 2; 6	SNE; 3; 11^{5}	SPA; 1; 19	SPA; 2; 12	SPA; 3; 6^{3}	SIL2; 1; 13	SIL2; 2; 9	SIL2; 3 Ret	BRH; 1; 7	BRH; 2; 5	BRH; 3; 8	DON2; 1; 10	DON2; 2; 18	DON2; 3; 3^{2}	10th	252.5
