= Frederick Lubin =

British racing driver (born 2004)

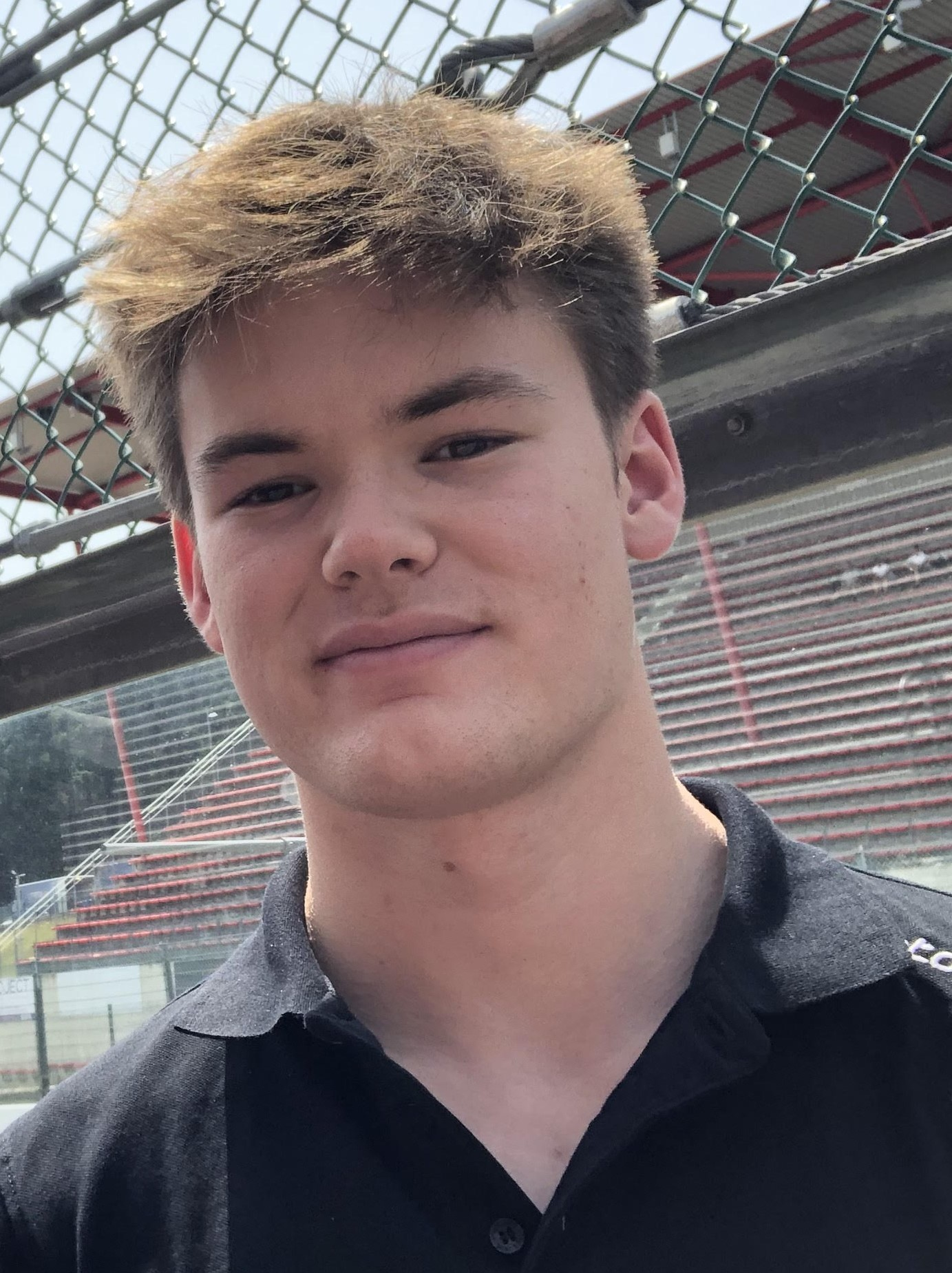
- Lubin in 2022
- Nationality: (United Kingdom) British
- Born: 23 August 2004 (age 22) London, United Kingdom

FIA World Endurance Championship career
- Debut season: 2023
- Current team: United Autosports
- Categorisation: FIA Silver
- Starts: 7 (7 entries)
- Wins: 1
- Podiums: 3
- Poles: 0
- Fastest laps: 0
- Best finish: 3rd (LMP2) in 2023

Previous series
- 2022 2022 2021 2020: EF Open Championship; FR Asian Championship; GB3 Championship; F4 British Championship

Frederick Barclay Lubin (born 23 August 2004) is a British racing driver. He competed in the FIA World Endurance Championship for United Autosports.

== Early life and education ==
From London, Lubin is the grandson of Sir Frederick Hugh Barclay and of British-Japanese and American heritage. He attended the Halcyon London International School in Marylebone.

== Early career ==
=== F4 British Championship ===
After beginning his karting career at the comparatively late age of thirteen, Lubin made his single-seater debut in the F4 British Championship in 2020, partnering Alex Connor and Roman Bilinski as the only rookie at the TRS Arden Junior Team. He started off the season with relative success, scoring points in all three races at Donington Park. However, Lubin was unable to score another hattrick of points until the fifth round of the campaign at Thruxton. After an off in the first Silverstone race, Lubin did not finish a race outside of a points-scoring position again, leading him on to take ninth in the standings at the end of the year. In addition, he also managed to win six races in the rookie cup and came second in that class, only losing out to Christian Mansell.

=== GB3 Championship ===
In 2021, Lubin progressed to the BRDC British Formula 3 Championship. He remained with Arden and was once again joined by Alex Connor. Lubin once again started his campaign in convincing fashion, getting two fourth-placed finishes in the second race at Brands Hatch and Silverstone respectively, and was even outscoring his teammate at that time. Before the third round however, Lubin had to withdraw following a diagnosis that he had myocarditis, rendering him unable to compete. He returned for the fifth event, held at the Snetterton Circuit, where he would finish all three races in the top eight, with a best finish of fifth in race two. Throughout the following rounds, he would continue scoring regular top-ten-finishes, before finishing off the campaign by taking a pair of podiums at the final two reversed-grid races of the year. This pair of third places would elevate Lubin to eleventh in the standings.

=== Euroformula Open ===
Having competed in three rounds of the Formula Regional Asian Championship with Evans GP at the start of 2022, Lubin made a move to the Euroformula Open Championship with Team Motopark. Two runner-up finishes in the opening round at Estoril brought a strong start to the campaign, although Lubin would be unable to take a place on the rostrum until Race 1 in Hungary, by which stage he had fallen far behind championship leader and teammate Oliver Goethe. More podiums came in Imola and Monza, before the Briton won the final race of the season in Barcelona, thus taking his first victory in single-seater racing and finishing fourth in the drivers' championship.

== Sportscar career ==
At the end of 2022, Lubin took his maiden step into sportscar racing, teaming up with Vector Sport during the post-season test of the FIA World Endurance Championship at the Bahrain Circuit.

Going into the 2023 season, it would be announced that Lubin would compete for United Autosports in the WEC. At the season opener in Sebring, Lubin and his teammates Filipe Albuquerque and Phil Hanson profited from a loss of drive from the initially leading sister car to end up finishing second, being beaten only by the non-championship No. 48 Jota entry. Another runner-up finish followed at Portimão, where the No. 22 crew narrowly lost out on victory to the United No. 23.

Following a top-five finish in Belgium, which helped them maintain their championship lead, the grid migrated to France for the 24 Hours of Le Mans. There, Lubin became involved in an incident which cost his team several laps of repair time, as he lost control whilst trying to overtake the GTE of Mikkel O. Pedersen on the run-off area after Tetre Rouge, causing his car to collide with the Porsche. Having slid off course a few hours later as well, Lubin finished the race eleventh in class. After missing out on a podium at Monza, Lubin contributed towards a runner-up finish in Fuji, despite being ill throughout the weekend. A ninth place in Bahrain concluded the campaign, meaning that Lubin would finish third in the LMP2 standings.

== Karting record ==
=== Karting career summary ===
Season	Series	Team	Position
2019	Motorsport UK Kartmasters Grand Prix — Rotax Junior	Project One	26th

== Racing record ==
=== Racing career summary ===
Season	Series	Team	Races	Wins	Poles	F/Laps	Podiums	Points	Position
2020	F4 British Championship	TRS Arden Junior Team	26	0	0	0	0	111	9th
2021	GB3 Championship	Arden International	18	0	0	1	2	263	11th
2022	Formula Regional Asian Championship	Evans GP	9	0	0	0	0	10	19th
2022	Euroformula Open Championship	Team Motopark	26	1	0	2	9	293	4th
2023	FIA World Endurance Championship - LMP2	United Autosports	7	0	0	0	3	104	**3rd**
2023	24 Hours of Le Mans - LMP2	United Autosports	1	0	0	0	0	N/A	11th

* Season still in progress.

=== Complete F4 British Championship results ===
(key) (Races in bold indicate pole position) (Races in italics indicate fastest lap)

Year	Team	1	2	3	4	5	6	7	8	9	10	11	12	13	14	15	16	17	18	19	20	21	22	23	24	25	26	DC	Points
2020	TRS Arden Junior Team	DON; 1; 9	DON; 2; 4	DON; 3; 10	BHGP; 1 Ret	BHGP; 2; 13	BHGP; 3; 10	OUL; 1; 7	OUL; 2; 6	OUL; 3; 13	KNO; 1; 11	KNO; 2; 10	KNO; 3; 9	THR; 1; 7	THR; 2; 4	THR; 3; 8	SIL; 1 Ret	SIL; 2; 9	SIL; 3; 9	CRO; 1; 4	CRO; 2; 7	SNE; 1; 7	SNE; 2; 10	SNE; 3; 7	BHI; 1; 6	BHI; 2; 6	BHI; 3; 5	9th	111

=== Complete GB3 Championship results ===
(key) (Races in bold indicate pole position) (Races in italics indicate fastest lap)

Year	Entrant	1	2	3	4	5	6	7	8	9	10	11	12	13	14	15	16	17	18	19	20	21	22	23	24	DC	Points
2021	Arden International	BRH; 1; 6	BRH; 2; 4	BRH; 3; 11^{2}	SIL1; 1; 15	SIL1; 2; 4	SIL1; 3; 7^{7}	DON1; 1	DON1; 2	DON1; 3	SPA; 1	SPA; 2	SPA; 3	SNE; 1; 8	SNE; 2; 5	SNE; 3; 7^{10}	SIL2; 1; 5	SIL2; 2; 10	SIL2; 3; 9^{3}	OUL; 1; 13	OUL; 2; 6	OUL; 3; 3^{4}	DON2; 1; 8	DON2; 2; 13	DON2; 3; 3^{4}	11th	263

=== Complete Formula Regional Asian Championship results ===
(key) (Races in bold indicate pole position) (Races in italics indicate the fastest lap of top ten finishers)

Year	Entrant	1	2	3	4	5	6	7	8	9	10	11	12	13	14	15	DC	Points
2022	Evans GP	ABU; 1; 7	ABU; 2; 8	ABU; 3; 21	DUB; 1; 16	DUB; 2; 12	DUB; 3; 14	DUB; 1; 17	DUB; 2; 19	DUB; 3; 18	DUB; 1	DUB; 2	DUB; 3	ABU; 1	ABU; 2	ABU; 3	19th	10

=== Complete Euroformula Open Championship results ===
(key) (Races in bold indicate pole position; races in italics indicate points for the fastest lap of top ten finishers)

Year	Entrant	1	2	3	4	5	6	7	8	9	10	11	12	13	14	15	16	17	18	19	20	21	22	23	24	25	26	DC	Points
2022	Team Motopark	EST; 1; 5	EST; 2; 2	EST; 3; 2	PAU; 1 Ret	PAU; 2; 8	LEC; 1; 8	LEC; 2; 6	LEC; 3; 4	SPA; 1; 7	SPA; 2; 6	SPA; 3; 6	HUN; 1; 3	HUN; 2; 6	HUN; 3; 4	IMO; 1; 5	IMO; 2; 2	IMO; 3; 3	RBR; 1; 5	RBR; 2; 4	RBR; 3; 7	MNZ; 1; 2	MNZ; 2; 4	MNZ; 3; 3	CAT; 1; 5	CAT; 2; 3	CAT; 3; 1	4th	293

=== Complete FIA World Endurance Championship results ===
Year	Entrant	Class	Chassis	Engine	1	2	3	4	5	6	7	Rank	Points
2023	United Autosports	LMP2	Oreca 07	Gibson GK428 4.2 L V8	SEB; 1	PRT; 2	SPA; 5	LMS; 8	MNZ; 6	**FUJ**; 2	BHR; 9	3rd	104

^{*} Season still in progress.

=== Complete 24 Hours of Le Mans results ===
Year	Team	Co-Drivers	Car	Class	Laps	Pos.	Class Pos.
2023	(United Kingdom) United Autosports	(Portugal) Filipe Albuquerque (United Kingdom) Phil Hanson	Oreca 07-Gibson	LMP2	321	21st	11th
