= 2021 GB3 Championship =

Motor racing competition in England

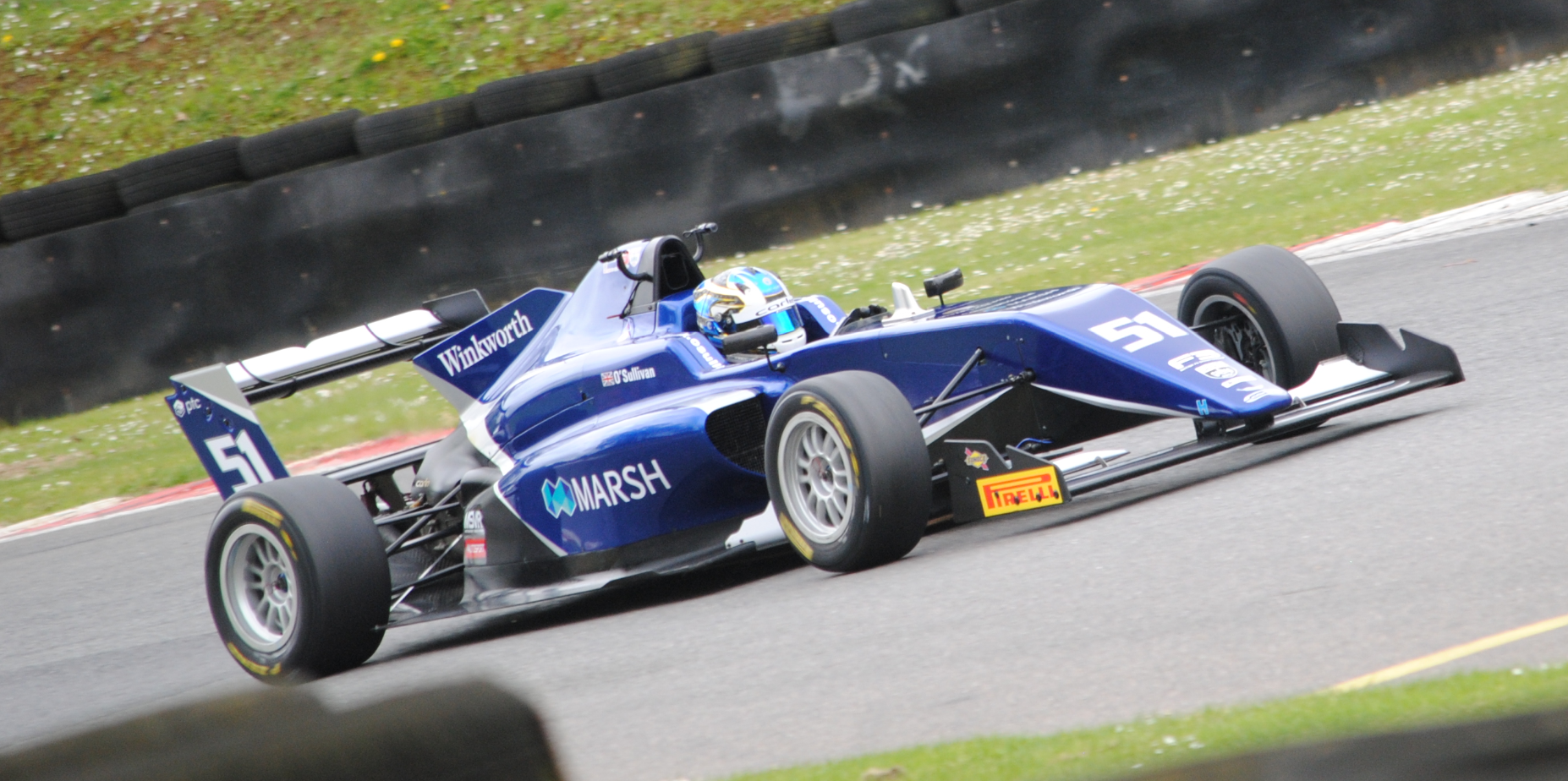
Zak O'Sullivan, the Drivers' Championship winner.

The 2021 GB3 Championship, known as the 2021 BRDC British Formula 3 Championship until August 2021, was a motor racing championship for open wheel, formula racing cars held across England. The 2021 season was the sixth organised by the British Racing Drivers' Club in the United Kingdom. The championship featured a mix of professional motor racing teams and privately funded drivers, and also featured the 2-litre 230-bhp Tatuus-Cosworth single seat race car in the main series. The season ran over eight triple- and quadruple-header rounds, it started on 22 May at Brands Hatch and ended on 17 October at Donington Park. The series was rebranded mid-season from BRDC British Formula 3 Championship.

Zak O'Sullivan took the drivers' championship at the final round at Donington Park, as Carlin took the inaugural teams' championship.

== Teams and drivers ==
All teams were British-registered.

Team	No.	Driver	Rounds
Elite Motorsport	3	(Spain) Javier Sagrera	All
Elite Motorsport	34	(United Kingdom) Tom Lebbon	All
Elite Motorsport	67	(United Kingdom) James Hedley	8
Elite Motorsport	99	(Mexico) José Garfias	1–6
Arden International	4	(Poland) Roman Biliński	3–8
Arden International	27	(United Kingdom) Alex Connor	1–3
Arden International	78	(United Kingdom) Frederick Lubin	1–2, 5–8
Hillspeed	5	(Republic of Ireland) Jonathan Browne	6–8
Hillspeed	33	(Australia) Flynn Jackes (Note: Jackes is an Australian-Filipino driver competing under an Australian license.)	8
Fortec Motorsports	7	(Brazil) Roberto Faria	All
Fortec Motorsports	8	(United States) Hunter Yeany	4
Fortec Motorsports	8	(United Kingdom) Luke Browning	7
Fortec Motorsports	16	(Philippines) Eduardo Coseteng	8
Fortec Motorsports	43	(Denmark) Mikkel Grundtvig	All
Fortec Motorsports	87	(United Kingdom) Oliver Bearman	1, 5–6
Douglas Motorsport	10	(Saudi Arabia) Reema Juffali	All
Douglas Motorsport	55	(United Kingdom) Dexter Patterson	1–4
Douglas Motorsport	55	(Australia) Tommy Smith	5–6, 8
Hitech Grand Prix	12	(Mexico) Sebastián Álvarez	All
Hitech Grand Prix	13	(United States) Reece Ushijima	All
Hitech Grand Prix	50	(Australia) Bart Horsten	All
Chris Dittmann Racing	18	(United Kingdom) Ayrton Simmons	All
Chris Dittmann Racing	68	(United Kingdom) Branden Lee Oxley	5–8
Chris Dittmann Racing	81	(United Kingdom) Max Marzorati	1–4
Chris Dittmann Racing	90	(United Kingdom) Alex Fores	1, 8
Carlin	21	(Australia) Christian Mansell	All
Carlin	23	(United States) Bryce Aron	All
Carlin	51	(United Kingdom) Zak O'Sullivan	All
Sources:

- JHR Developments was named as one of the participating teams but did not appear at any round.

== Race calendar and results ==
The provisional calendar was revealed on 15 October 2020. After being cancelled because of the COVID-19 pandemic in 2020, the round at Spa-Francorchamps returned to the series. The series supported the British GT Championship at seven of its eight meetings. The calendar was slightly changed later on to ensure eight rounds could be run.

Round		Circuit	Date	Pole position	Fastest lap	Winning driver	Winning team
1	R1	Brands Hatch (Grand Prix Circuit, Kent)	22 May	(United Kingdom) Ayrton Simmons	(United Kingdom) Ayrton Simmons	(United Kingdom) Ayrton Simmons	Chris Dittmann Racing
1	R2	Brands Hatch (Grand Prix Circuit, Kent)	23 May	(United Kingdom) Ayrton Simmons	(United Kingdom) Zak O'Sullivan	(United Kingdom) Zak O'Sullivan	Carlin
1	R3	Brands Hatch (Grand Prix Circuit, Kent)	23 May		(Japan) Reece Ushijima	(Australia) Christian Mansell	Carlin
2	R4	Silverstone Circuit (Grand Prix Circuit, Northamptonshire)	26 June	(Japan) Reece Ushijima	(Australia) Bart Horsten	(Japan) Reece Ushijima	Hitech Grand Prix
2	R5	Silverstone Circuit (Grand Prix Circuit, Northamptonshire)	27 June	(Japan) Reece Ushijima	(United Kingdom) Frederick Lubin	(Japan) Reece Ushijima	Hitech Grand Prix
2	R6	Silverstone Circuit (Grand Prix Circuit, Northamptonshire)	27 June		(Brazil) Roberto Faria	(United Kingdom) Ayrton Simmons	Chris Dittmann Racing
3	R7	Donington Park (Grand Prix Circuit, Leicestershire)	10 July	(United Kingdom) Zak O'Sullivan	(United Kingdom) Zak O'Sullivan	(United Kingdom) Zak O'Sullivan	Carlin
3	R8	Donington Park (Grand Prix Circuit, Leicestershire)	11 July	(United Kingdom) Zak O'Sullivan	(Australia) Bart Horsten	(United Kingdom) Zak O'Sullivan	Carlin
3	R9	Donington Park (Grand Prix Circuit, Leicestershire)	11 July		(Spain) Javier Sagrera	(Denmark) Mikkel Grundtvig	Fortec Motorsports
4	R10	Circuit de Spa-Francorchamps (Spa, Belgium)	24 July	(Australia) Bart Horsten	(Australia) Christian Mansell	(Australia) Christian Mansell	Carlin
4	R11	Circuit de Spa-Francorchamps (Spa, Belgium)	24 July	(Australia) Bart Horsten	(United Kingdom) Zak O'Sullivan	(Poland) Roman Biliński	Arden International
4	R12	Circuit de Spa-Francorchamps (Spa, Belgium)	25 July		(Japan) Reece Ushijima	(Brazil) Roberto Faria	Fortec Motorsports
5	R13	Snetterton Circuit (300 Circuit, Norfolk)	7 August	(United Kingdom) Oliver Bearman	(Brazil) Roberto Faria	(United Kingdom) Oliver Bearman	Fortec Motorsports
5	R14	Snetterton Circuit (300 Circuit, Norfolk)	8 August	(Mexico) Sebastián Álvarez	(United Kingdom) Zak O'Sullivan	(Mexico) Sebastián Álvarez	Hitech Grand Prix
5	R15	Snetterton Circuit (300 Circuit, Norfolk)	8 August		(Australia) Bart Horsten	(Poland) Roman Biliński	Arden International
6	R16	Silverstone Circuit (Grand Prix Circuit, Northamptonshire)	14 August	(United Kingdom) Oliver Bearman	(Brazil) Roberto Faria	(United Kingdom) Ayrton Simmons	Chris Dittmann Racing
6	R17	Silverstone Circuit (Grand Prix Circuit, Northamptonshire)	15 August	(United Kingdom) Ayrton Simmons	(United Kingdom) Oliver Bearman	(United Kingdom) Ayrton Simmons	Chris Dittmann Racing
6	R18	Silverstone Circuit (Grand Prix Circuit, Northamptonshire)	15 August		(United Kingdom) Zak O'Sullivan	(United Kingdom) Zak O'Sullivan	Carlin
7	R19	Oulton Park (International Circuit, Cheshire)	11 September	(United Kingdom) Zak O'Sullivan	(United Kingdom) Zak O'Sullivan	(United Kingdom) Zak O'Sullivan	Carlin
7	R20	Oulton Park (International Circuit, Cheshire)	12 September	(United Kingdom) Zak O'Sullivan	(United Kingdom) Zak O'Sullivan	(United Kingdom) Luke Browning	Fortec Motorsports
7	R21	Oulton Park (International Circuit, Cheshire)	12 September		(Poland) Roman Biliński	(Poland) Roman Biliński	Arden International
8	R22	Donington Park (Grand Prix Circuit, Leicestershire)	16 October	(United Kingdom) Zak O'Sullivan	(Australia) Bart Horsten	(United Kingdom) Zak O'Sullivan	Carlin
8	R23	Donington Park (Grand Prix Circuit, Leicestershire)	17 October	(Japan) Reece Ushijima	(United Kingdom) Zak O'Sullivan	(United Kingdom) Zak O'Sullivan	Carlin
8	R24	Donington Park (Grand Prix Circuit, Leicestershire)	17 October		(Japan) Reece Ushijima	(Denmark) Mikkel Grundtvig	Fortec Motorsports

== Championship standings ==
Scoring system

Points were awarded to the top 20 classified finishers in races one and two, with the third race awarding points to only the top 15. Race three, which had its grid formed by reversing the qualifying order, awarded extra points for positions gained from the drivers' respective starting positions.

Races	Position, points per race																			
Races	1st	2nd	3rd	4th	5th	6th	7th	8th	9th	10th	11th	12th	13th	14th	15th	16th	17th	18th	19th	20th
Races 1 & 2	35	29	24	21	19	17	15	13	12	11	10	9	8	7	6	5	4	3	2	1
Race 3	20	17	15	13	11	10	9	8	7	6	5	4	3	2	1					

Notes

- ^{1} ^{2} ^{3} refers to positions gained and thus extra points earned during race three.

=== Drivers' championship ===
Pos	Driver	BRH			SIL1			DON1			SPA			SNE			SIL2			OUL			DON2			Pts
Pos	Driver	R1	R2	R3	R1	R2	R3	R1	R2	R3	R1	R2	R3	R1	R2	R3	R1	R2	R3	R1	R2	R3	R1	R2	R3	Pts
1	(United Kingdom) Zak O'Sullivan	3	1	7^{10}	2	2	9^{6}	**1**	**1**	Ret	2	2	7^{8}	17	2	2^{3}	15	4	1^{5}	**1**	**Ret**	6^{10}	**1**	1	8^{13}	535
2	(United Kingdom) Ayrton Simmons	**1**	**Ret**	13^{6}	10	10	1^{3}	15	8	8	9	10	8	6	7	6^{10}	1	**1**	11^{2}	2	4	7^{7}	11	5	10^{4}	381
3	(Australia) Christian Mansell	8	10	1^{6}	8	7	11	5	6	6^{4}	1	3	5^{8}	7	11	10^{5}	4	9	8^{2}	5	3	11	13	3	16	371
4	(Japan) Reece Ushijima	5	3	6^{8}	**1**	**1**	10^{6}	2	Ret	Ret	11	8	6^{5}	Ret	13	11^{2}	13	8	6^{9}	6	5	15	2	**2**	20	366
5	(Brazil) Roberto Faria	Ret	6	12^{4}	5	3	3^{7}	14	3	13	12	9	1^{3}	2	8	3^{5}	2	3	Ret	3	Ret	10^{3}	12	10	4^{11}	360
6	(Australia) Bart Horsten	4	Ret	8^{7}	3	6	Ret	8	DSQ	7^{10}	**5**	**4**	9^{7}	10	12	16^{2}	7	5	2^{7}	4	2	14	18	4	11^{9}	333
7	(Poland) Roman Biliński							4	5	5^{7}	3	1	4^{8}	3	3	1^{2}	8	Ret	Ret	11	13	1^{3}	3	9	9^{8}	313
8	(Mexico) Sebastián Álvarez	11	8	Ret	6	12	8^{1}	10	9	9	7	6	15	4	**1**	4^{6}	16	16	3^{5}	9	14	5^{1}	Ret	8	7^{11}	290
9	(United Kingdom) Tom Lebbon	9	7	10^{1}	Ret	8	6^{2}	6	10	3^{7}	4	8	12	16	4	5^{4}	14	14	5^{2}	10	7	8	5	20	5^{8}	288
10	(Spain) Javier Sagrera	12	12	2^{2}	4	5	Ret	9	4	11^{1}	6	7	11	15	10	18	9	7	12^{4}	7	Ret	4^{6}	7	11	Ret	265
11	(United Kingdom) Frederick Lubin	6	4	11^{2}	15	4	7^{7}							8	5	7^{10}	5	10	9^{3}	13	6	3^{4}	8	13	3^{4}	263
12	(United States) Bryce Aron	10	9	4^{4}	9	11	DSQ	13	11	4^{2}	10	11	14	11	6	13	10	11	7	14	8	13	6	6	14	237
13	(Denmark) Mikkel Grundtvig	16	15	5	12	14	Ret	17	13	1^{2}	14	13	2^{1}	14	16	9	11	13	10	16	11	2	14	14	1	214
14	(United Kingdom) Oliver Bearman	2	2	9^{9}										**1**	Ret	14	**Ret**	2	4^{10}							163
15	(United Kingdom) Alex Connor	7	5	14	7	9	2^{5}	3	2	Ret																138
16	(United Kingdom) Branden Lee Oxley													5	14	12	6	6	DSQ	8	12	12	4	7	19	126
17	(Mexico) José Garfias	Ret	14	15	11	15	5^{1}	11	12	10	13	Ret	10^{3}	9	9	8^{6}	WD	WD	WD							117
18	(Saudi Arabia) Reema Juffali	15	16	Ret	13	16	4	16	Ret	Ret	15	12	Ret	13	17	17	WD	WD	WD	15	10	Ret	Ret	18	15	90
19	(Republic of Ireland) Jonathan Browne																3	12	13	12	9	9	15	Ret	6^{3}	83
20	(United Kingdom) Max Marzorati	14	13	Ret	14	13	Ret	12	14	2	16	14	13													78
21	(United Kingdom) Dexter Patterson	13	11	3^{3}	DSQ	DSQ	EX (Note: Dexter Patterson was excluded from the results at the first Silverstone round after an altercation with Bryce Aron in the paddock after race two.)	7	7	12	WD	WD	WD													70
22	(Australia) Tommy Smith													12	15	15	12	15	14^{3}				Ret	16	18	41
23	(United Kingdom) Alex Fores	Ret	DNS	Ret																			9	15	2^{2}	37
24	(United States) Hunter Yeany										8	15	3^{1}													36
25	(United Kingdom) Luke Browning																			DSQ	1	Ret				35
26	(United Kingdom) James Hedley																						10	12	13	23
27	(Philippines) Eduardo Coseteng																						16	17	12	13
28	(Australia) Flynn Jackes																						17	19	17	6
Pos	Driver	R1	R2	R3	R1	R2	R3	R1	R2	R3	R1	R2	R3	R1	R2	R3	R1	R2	R3	R1	R2	R3	R1	R2	R3	Pts
Pos	Driver	BRH			SIL1			DON1			SPA			SNE			SIL2			OUL			DON2			Pts

Colour	Result
Gold	Winner
Silver	Second place
Bronze	Third place
Green	Points classification
Blue	Non-points classification
Blue	Non-classified finish (NC)
Purple	Retired, not classified (Ret)
Red	Did not qualify (DNQ)
Red	Did not pre-qualify (DNPQ)
Black	Disqualified (DSQ)
White	Did not start (DNS)
White	Withdrew (WD)
White	Race cancelled (C)
Blank	Did not practice (DNP)
Blank	Did not arrive (DNA)
Blank	Excluded (EX)

**Bold** – Pole

Italics – Fastest Lap

=== Teams' championship ===
2021 saw the introduction of a teams' championship, with each team counting its two best results of every race.

Pos	Driver	BRH			SIL1			DON1			SPA			SNE			SIL2			OUL			DON2			Pts
Pos	Driver	R1	R2	R3	R1	R2	R3	R1	R2	R3	R1	R2	R3	R1	R2	R3	R1	R2	R3	R1	R2	R3	R1	R2	R3	Pts
1	Carlin	3	1	1^{6}	2	2	9^{6}	1	1	7^{4}	1	2	6^{7}	7	2	2^{3}	4	4	1^{5}	1	3	6^{10}	1	1	8^{13}	966
1	Carlin	8	9	7^{10}	8	7	11	5	7	5^{1}	2	3	7^{8}	12	6	10^{5}	10	9	8^{2}	5	8	11	6	3	14	966
2	Hitech Grand Prix	4	3	6^{8}	1	1	10^{6}	2	5	8^{9}	5	4	3^{8}	4	1	4^{6}	7	5	2^{7}	4	2	5^{1}	2	2	7^{11}	842
2	Hitech Grand Prix	5	8	8^{7}	3	6	8^{1}	8	10	10	7	5	10^{6}	10	12	11^{2}	13	8	3^{5}	6	5	14	18	4	11^{9}	842
3	Fortec Motorsports	2	2	9^{9}	5	3	3^{7}	14	3	1^{2}	8	9	1^{3}	1	8	3^{5}	2	2	4^{10}	3	1	2	12	10	4^{11}	747
3	Fortec Motorsports	16	6	5	13	14	Ret	17	14	13	12	13	2^{1}	2	16	9	11	3	10	16	11	10^{3}	14	14	1	747
4	Arden International	6	4	11^{2}	8	4	2^{5}	3	2	6^{6}	3	1	5^{7}	3	3	1^{2}	5	10	9^{3}	11	6	1^{3}	3	6	3^{4}	719
4	Arden International	7	5	14	16	9	7^{7}	4	6	Ret				8	5	7^{10}	8	Ret	Ret	13	13	3^{4}	8	13	9^{8}	719
5	Elite Motorsport	9	7	2^{2}	4	5	5^{1}	6	4	3^{7}	4	6	8^{2}	9	4	5^{4}	9	7	5^{2}	7	7	4^{6}	5	11	5^{8}	614
5	Elite Motorsport	12	12	10^{1}	12	8	6^{2}	9	11	11	6	7	11^{3}	11	9	8^{6}	14	14	12^{4}	10	Ret	8	7	12	13	614
6	Chris Dittmann Racing	1	13	13^{6}	11	10	1^{3}	12	9	2	9	10	9	5	7	6^{10}	1	1	11^{2}	2	4	7^{7}	4	5	2^{2}	604
6	Chris Dittmann Racing	14	Ret	Ret	15	13	Ret	15	15	9	16	14	13	6	14	12	6	6	DSQ	8	12	12	9	8	10^{4}	604
7	Douglas Motorsport	13	11	3^{3}	6	16	4	7	8	4^{4}	15	12	Ret	13	15	15	12	15	14^{3}	15	10	Ret	Ret	16	15	201
7	Douglas Motorsport	15	16	Ret	14	17	EX	16	Ret	14†	WD	WD	WD	14	17	17	WD	WD	WD				Ret	18	18	201
8	Hillspeed																3	12	13	12	9	9	15	19	6^{3}	89
8	Hillspeed																						17	Ret	17	89
Pos	Driver	R1	R2	R3	R1	R2	R3	R1	R2	R3	R1	R2	R3	R1	R2	R3	R1	R2	R3	R1	R2	R3	R1	R2	R3	Pts
Pos	Driver	BRH			SIL1			DON1			SPA			SNE			SIL2			OUL			DON2			Pts
