= Tommy Foster (racing driver) =

British racing driver (born 2002)

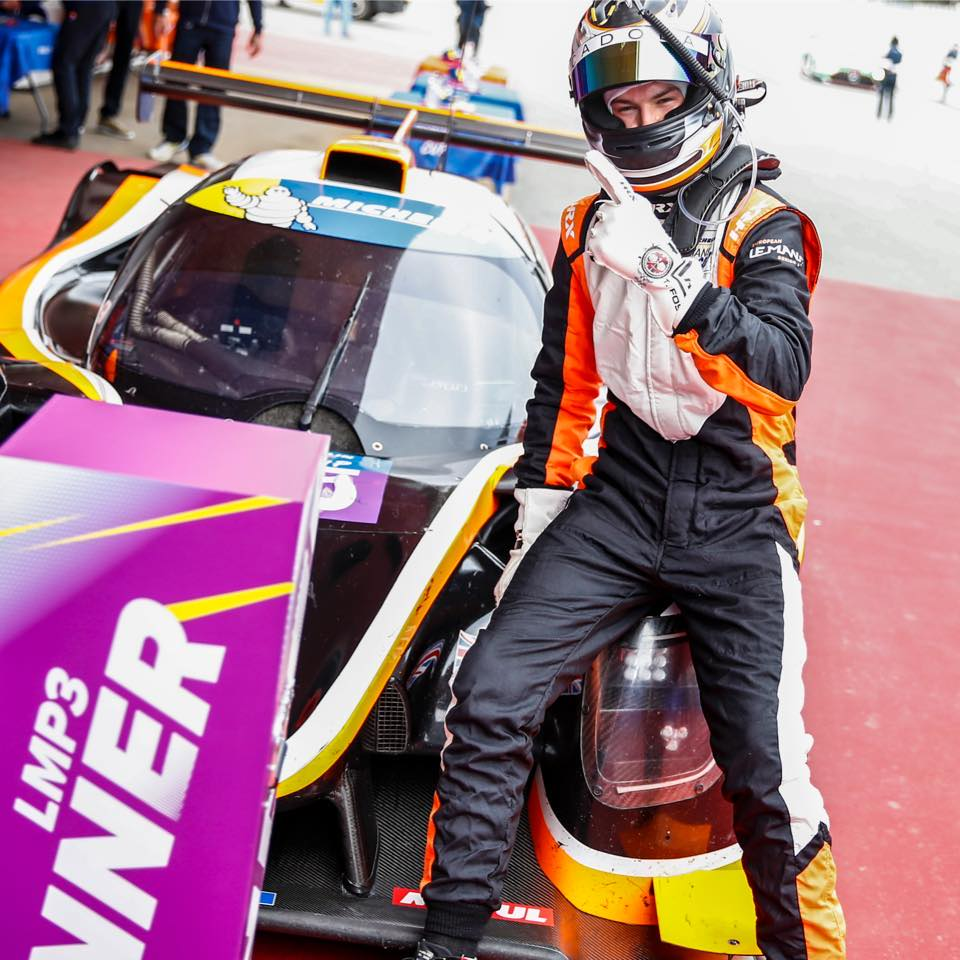
- Foster in 2021
- Nationality: (United Kingdom) British
- Born: Tommy Michael Foster; 10 April 2002 (age 24) Newquay, England
- Categorisation: FIA Silver (until 2021, 2027–); FIA Gold (2022–2026)

Tommy Michael Foster (born 10 April 2002) is a British racing driver who last competed for Team RJN in the GT World Challenge Europe Endurance Cup.

== Career ==
Foster began karting at the age of six. During his karting career, he was most notably the 2017 British Open champion in Junior Max and the 2017 and 2018 English Open champion as an Arden-backed karter.

During his final year of karting in 2018, Foster made his single-seater debut in FF1600, before stepping up to the F4 British Championship with TRS Arden Junior Team for his first full-season in single-seaters. After taking his first pole at Thruxton, Foster took his maiden series win three rounds later at Snetterton, and then taking his second and final podium of the season by finishing second in race two of the second Thruxton round as he closed out the season eighth in points. During 2019, Foster also made a one-off appearance in the Formula 4 United States Championship in the season-ending round at Circuit of the Americas.

After taking a one-year hiatus due to the COVID-19 pandemic, Foster joined RLR MSport to race part-time in the LMP3 class of the Le Mans Cup. Foster won on debut at Barcelona and finished in the top six in two of his next three outings, but was not eligible for points as the team's entry wasn't for the full-season.

In 2022, Foster returned to RLR MSport to race in the LMP3 class of the Le Mans Cup. Racing in the first two rounds of the season, Foster finished third in the season-opening race at Le Castellet before finishing 19th at Imola. Following this, Foster was given a 17-month ban from driving on the roads following a DUI incident back in March, before his Motorsport UK licence was suspended indefinitely in June.

Foster joined 360 Racing for his first full-time season in the LMP3 class of the Le Mans Cup in 2023. Scoring points in all but two races, Foster took a best result of fourth at Algarve en route to a sixth-place finish. Remaining in LMP3 competition for 2024, Foster joined High Class Racing alongside Jens Reno Møller for his second full-time season in Le Mans Cup. After winning the season-opening round at Barcelona, Foster finished third at Le Mans and Algarve to end the year third in points.

Foster then switched to GT3 competition for 2025, joining Team RJN to compete in the Gold Cup of the GT World Challenge Europe Endurance Cup. In his rookie year in the series, Foster scored a best class result of fourth at Le Castellet en route to a fifth-place points finish in the Gold Cup standings.

== Karting record ==
=== Karting career summary ===
Season	Series	Team	Position
2015	Super One Series – Mini Max	Protrain	15th
2016	Super One Series – Junior Max		8th
2016	Kartmasters British GP – Rotax Junior		4th
2017	Super One Series – Junior Max		5th
2017	Kartmasters British GP – Rotax Junior		2nd
2017	Rotax Max Challenge Grand Finals – Junior Max	Dan Holland Racing	17th
2018	Kartmasters British GP – Rotax Senior		6th

== Racing record ==
=== Racing career summary ===
Season	Series	Team	Races	Wins	Poles	F/Laps	Podiums	Points	Position
2018	National Formula Ford 1600		3	0	0	0	0	9	36th
2019	F4 British Championship	TRS Arden Junior Team	30	1	1	1	2	207	8th
2019	Formula 4 United States Championship	Alliance Racing by Gas Monkey	2	0	0	0	0	0	36th
2021	Le Mans Cup – LMP3	RLR MSport	4	1	0	0	1	0	NC
2022	Le Mans Cup – LMP3	RLR MSport	2	0	0	0	1	15	14th
2022	Praga Cup	Idola Motorsport	3	1	1	0	1	53	14th
2023	Le Mans Cup – LMP3	360 Racing	7	0	0	0	0	39	6th
2024	Le Mans Cup – LMP3	High Class Racing	7	1	0	0	3	61	**3rd**
2025	GT World Challenge Europe Endurance Cup	Team RJN	5	0	0	0	0	0	NC
2025	GT World Challenge Europe Endurance Cup – Gold	Team RJN	5	0	0	0	0	46	5th

=== Complete F4 British Championship results ===
(key) (Races in bold indicate pole position) (Races in italics indicate fastest lap)

Year	Team	1	2	3	4	5	6	7	8	9	10	11	12	13	14	15	16	17	18	19	20	21	22	23	24	25	26	27	28	29	30	DC	Points
2019	TRS Arden Junior Team	BHI; 1; 4	BHI; 2; 10	BHI; 3; 5	DON; 1; 10	DON; 2; 11	DON; 3 Ret	THR1; 1; 7	THR1; 2; 11	**THR1**; **3**; 4	CRO; 1; 4	CRO; 2; 4†	CRO; 3; 5	OUL; 1; 8	OUL; 2; 4	OUL; 3; 12	SNE; 1; 4	SNE; 2; 1	SNE; 3; 6	THR2; 1; 5	THR2; 2; 2	THR2; 3; 7	KNO; 1; 8	KNO; 2; 6	KNO; 3; 6	SIL; 1 Ret	SIL; 2; 8	SIL; 3; 6	BHGP; 1; 8	BHGP; 2; 9	BHGP; 3; 8	8th	207

=== Complete Le Mans Cup results ===
(key) (Races in bold indicate pole position; results in italics indicate fastest lap)

Year	Entrant	Class	Chassis	1	2	3	4	5	6	7	Rank	Points
2021	RLR MSport	LMP3	Ligier JS P320	BAR; 1	LEC; 4	MNZ; 16	LMS; 1	LMS; 2	SPA	POR; 6	NC	0
2022	RLR MSport	LMP3	Ligier JS P320	LEC; 3	IMO; 19	LMS; 1	LMS; 2	MNZ	SPA	ALG	14th	15
2023	360 Racing	LMP3	Ligier JS P320	CAT; 5	LMS; 1; 9	LMS; 2; 6	LEC; 6	ARA; 17	SPA; 15	ALG; 4	6th	39
2024	High Class Racing	LMP3	Ligier JS P320	CAT; 1	LEC; 6	LMS; 1; 14	LMS; 2; 3	SPA; Ret	MUG; 7	ALG; 3	3rd	61

=== Complete GT World Challenge Europe results ===
==== GT World Challenge Europe Endurance Cup ====
(Races in bold indicate pole position) (Races in italics indicate fastest lap)

Year	Team	Car	Class	1	2	3	4	5	6	7	Pos.	Points
2025	Team RJN	McLaren 720S GT3 Evo	Gold	LEC; 17	MNZ; 41	SPA; 6H; 31	SPA; 12H; 55	SPA; 24H; Ret	NÜR; 25	BAR; 25	5th	46
