= Rafaela Ferreira =

Brazilian racing driver (born 2005)

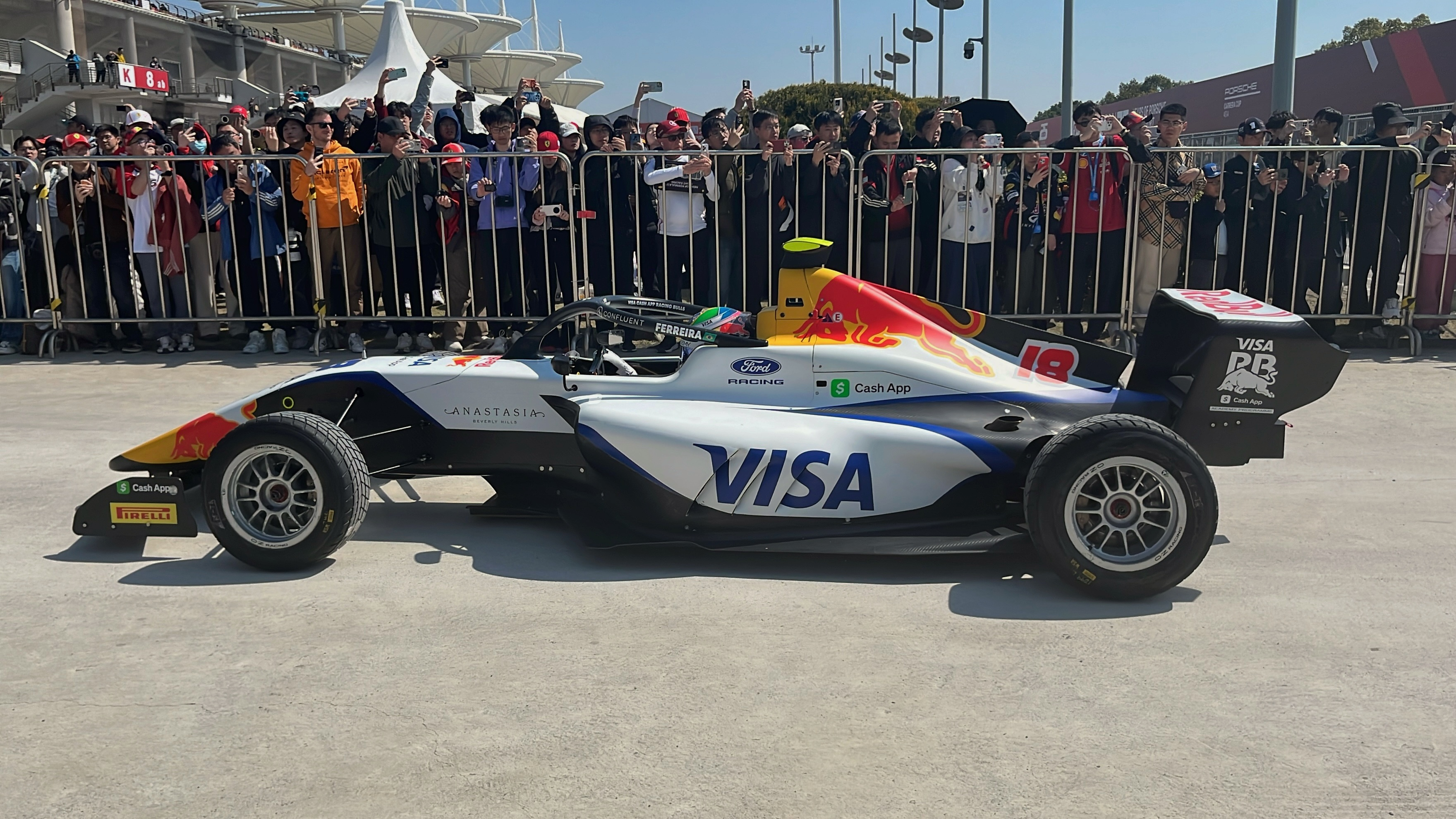
- Ferreira at the 2026 Chinese Grand Prix
- Nationality: (Brazil) Brazilian
- Born: Rafaela Daminelli Ferreira; 18 April 2005 (age 21) Criciúma, Santa Catarina, Brazil

F1 Academy career
- Debut season: 2025
- Current team: Campos Racing
- Car number: 18
- Starts: 26
- Wins: 0
- Podiums: 0
- Poles: 0
- Fastest laps: 0
- Best finish: 12th in 2025

Previous series
- 2025; 2023–2025: F4 Spanish; F4 Brazilian
- Statistics up to date as of 13 November 2026.

Rafaela Daminelli Ferreira (Brazilian Portuguese: [ʁafaˈɛlɐ feˈʁejɾɐ]; born 18 April 2005) is a Brazilian racing driver who competes in F1 Academy for Campos Racing as part of the Red Bull Academy Programme.

== Career ==
=== Karting ===
In 2022, Ferreira became the first woman to take pole position in the Copa Brasil de Kart, in the F4 Graduated category.

=== F4 Brazilian Championship ===
Ferreira joined the 2023 F4 Brazilian Championship, racing with TMG Racing. She became the first woman to stand on the podium in the series, with a third-place finish at Interlagos. She finished 13th overall. Ferreira and Cecília Rabelo were the only women to participate in the championship that year.

Ferreira returned to the championship in 2024 with the same team, becoming the first woman to win a race in the series after victories in Buenos Aires and Mogi Guaçu. She finished the season in fourth place, with three wins and ten podiums.

Ferreira returned in 2025 driving for Cavaleiro Sports for the second Interlagos Round which supported the 2025 São Paulo Grand Prix. Ferreira took fifth place in Race 1. She won the second race of the weekend taking her first win in the championship since the third round in Interlagos in 2024, where she won Race 1. Ferreira ended her weekend with a fourth place in Race 3.

=== F1 Academy ===
On October 30, 2024, the Racing Bulls Formula One team announced that Ferreira would be representing the team in the 2025 F1 Academy season, replacing Amna Al Qubaisi. She raced for Campos Racing with teammates and fellow Red Bull Academy members Alisha Palmowski and Chloe Chambers. Ferreira had five points scoring finishes in her rookie season and placed 12th overall in the driver's standings. Her highest race result was fifth place finish in Race 1 at Shanghai.

Ferreira will continue to race in the 2026 F1 Academy season as the Racing Bulls supported driver.

== Personal life ==
Ferreira is from Santa Catarina, Brazil. She has stated that Bia Figueiredo, a female Brazilian racing driver, was an inspiration to her while she was growing up. Ferreira has collaborated with former Formula One driver Daniel Ricciardo and his clothing brand in partnership with Racing Bulls on the F1 Academy grid.

== Racing record ==
=== Racing career summary ===
Season	Series	Team	Races	Wins	Poles	F/Laps	Podiums	Points	Position
2023	F4 Brazilian Championship	TMG Racing	18	0	0	0	1	40	13th
2024	F4 Brazilian Championship	TMG Racing	24	3	2	2	10	222	4th
2025	Formula Winter Series	Campos Racing	6	0	0	0	0	0	24th
2025	F1 Academy	Campos Racing	14	0	0	0	0	18	12th
2025	F4 Spanish Championship	DXR	3	0	0	0	0	0	39th
2025	F4 Brazilian Championship	Cavaleiro Sports	6	1	0	1	1	4	17th
2026	Formula Winter Series	Campos Racing	3	0	0	0	0	0	41st
2026	F1 Academy	Campos Racing	14	0	0	0	0	30	11th
2026	Italian F4 Championship	Cram Motorsport	10	0	0	0	0	0	63rd
2026	NASCAR Brasil Series	Cavaleiro Sports							

* Season still in progress.

=== Complete F4 Brazilian Championship results ===
(key) (Races in bold indicate pole position) (Races in italics indicate fastest lap)

Year	Team	1	2	3	5	4	6	7	8	9	10	11	12	13	14	15	16	17	18	19	20	21	22	23	24	25	DC	Points
2023	TMG Racing	INT1; 1; 11	INT1; 2; 6	INT1; 3; 9	INT2; 1; 10	INT2; 2; 10	INT2; 3; 11	MOG; 1 Ret	MOG; 2; 13	MOG; 3; 11	GYN; 1; 10	GYN; 2; 10	GYN; 3; 6	INT3; 1; 9	INT3; 2; 12	INT3; 3; 7	INT4; 1; 7	INT4; 2; 3	INT4; 3 Ret								13th	40
2024	TMG Racing	MGG1; 1; 3	MGG1; 2; 7	MGG1; 3; 2	**INT1**; **1**; 2	INT1; 2; 8	**INT1**; **3**; 9	MGG2; 1; 8	MGG2; 2; 1	MGG2; 3; 8	GOI1; 1; 3	GOI1; 2; 8	GOI1; 3; 5	BUA; 1; 7	BUA; 2; 1	BUA; 3; 2	INT2; 1; 7	INT2; 2 C	INT2; 3; 7	GOI2; 1; 7	GOI2; 2; 2	GOI2; 3; 5	INT3; 1; 1	INT3; 2; 7	INT3; 3; 2	INT3; 4; 7	4th	222
2025	Cavaleiro Sports	INT1; 1	INT1; 2	INT1; 3	MGG1; 1	MGG1; 2	MGG1; 3	MGG2; 1	MGG2; 2	MGG2; 3	MGG3; 1	MGG3; 2	MGG3; 3	INT2; 1; 5	INT2; 2; 1	INT2; 3; 4	INT3; 1	INT3; 2	INT3; 3	INT4; 1; 14	INT4; 2; 9	INT4; 3; 8					17th	4

=== Complete Formula Winter Series results ===
(key) (Races in bold indicate pole position) (Races in italics indicate fastest lap)

Year	Team	1	2	3	4	5	6	7	8	9	10	11	12	13	14	15	DC	Points
2025	Campos Racing	POR; 1; 16	POR; 2 Ret	POR; 3; 20	CRT; 1	CRT; 2	CRT; 3	ARA; 1; 12	ARA; 2; 24	ARA; 3; 23	CAT; 1	CAT; 2	CAT; 3				24th	0
2026	Campos Racing	EST; 1; 21	EST; 2; 20	EST; 3; 19	POR; 1	POR; 2	POR; 3	CRT; 1	CRT; 2	CRT; 3	ARA; 1	ARA; 2	ARA; 3	CAT; 1	CAT; 2	CAT; 3	41st	0

=== Complete F4 Spanish Championship results ===
(key) (Races in bold indicate pole position; races in italics indicate fastest lap)

Year	Team	1	2	3	4	5	6	7	8	9	10	11	12	13	14	15	16	17	18	19	20	21	DC	Points
2025	DXR by Drivex	ARA; 1	ARA; 2	ARA; 3	NAV; 1	NAV; 2	NAV; 3	POR; 1	POR; 2	POR; 3	LEC; 1	LEC; 2	LEC; 3	JER; 1; 28	JER; 2; 27	JER; 3; 28	CRT; 1	CRT; 2	CRT; 3	CAT; 1 WD	CAT; 2 WD	CAT; 3 WD	39th	0

=== Complete F1 Academy results ===
(key) (Races in bold indicate pole position; races in italics indicate fastest lap)

Year	Team	1	2	3	4	5	6	7	8	9	10	11	12	13	14	15	DC	Points
2025	Campos Racing	SHA; 1; 5	SHA; 2; 8	JED; 1; 13	JED; 2; 13	MIA; 1; 8	MIA; 2 C	MTL; 1; 13†	MTL; 2 Ret	MTL; 3; 12	ZAN; 1; 11	ZAN; 2; 8	SIN; 1 Ret	SIN; 2; 9	LVG; 1; 8	LVG; 2; 9	12th	18
2026	Campos Racing	SHA; 1; 4	SHA; 2; 6	MTL; 1; 4	MTL; 2; 8	MTL; 3; 10	SIL; 1; 11	SIL; 2 Ret	ZAN; 1; 14	ZAN; 2; 15	COA; 1; 14	COA; 2; 13	COA; 3; 15	LVG; 1	LVG; 2		7th*	27*

^{†} Did not finish, but classified.

=== Complete Italian F4 Championship results ===
(key) (Races in bold indicate pole position; races in italics indicate fastest lap)

Year	Team	1	2	3	4	5	6	7	8	9	10	11	12	13	14	15	16	17	18	19	20	21	22	23	24	25	26	27	28	DC	Points
2026	Cram Motorsport	MIS1; 1; 23†	MIS1; 2; 23	MIS1; 3	MIS1; 4 DNQ	VLL; 1	VLL; 2	VLL; 3	VLL; 4	MNZ; 1	MNZ; 2; 25	MNZ; 3 Ret	MNZ; 4 DNQ	MUG1; 1; 29	MUG1; 2; 26	MUG1; 3	MUG1; 4 DNQ	IMO; 1; 25	IMO; 2	IMO; 3; 26	IMO; 4 DNQ	MIS2; 1	MIS2; 2; 29	MIS2; 3; 28†	MIS2; 4 DNQ	MUG2; 1	MUG2; 2	MUG2; 3	MUG2; 4	63rd	0

=== Complete NASCAR Brasil Series results ===
(key) (Races in bold indicate pole position) (Races in italics indicate fastest lap)

Year	Team	Car	1	2	3	5	4	6	7	8	9	10	11	12	13	14	15	16	17	18	19	20	DC	Points
2026	Cavaleiro Sports	Chevrolet Camaro	SCZ; 1	SCZ; 2	CAS; 1	CAS; 2	INT; 1	INT; 2	VEL; 1	VEL; 2	MAT; 1	MAT; 2	LON; 1	LON; 2	CUR; 1	CUR; 2	CHA; 1; 18	CHA; 2; 20	CHA; 3 Ret	BRA; 1	BRA; 2	BRA; 3		
