= 2022 F4 Brazilian Championship =

Motor racing competition

Seasons
- ← none 2023 →

The 2022 F4 Brazilian Championship was the inaugural season of the F4 Brazilian Championship. It was a multi-event motor racing championship for open wheel, formula racing cars regulated according to FIA Formula 4 regulations. The championship used Tatuus F4 T-421 chassis.

== Teams and drivers ==
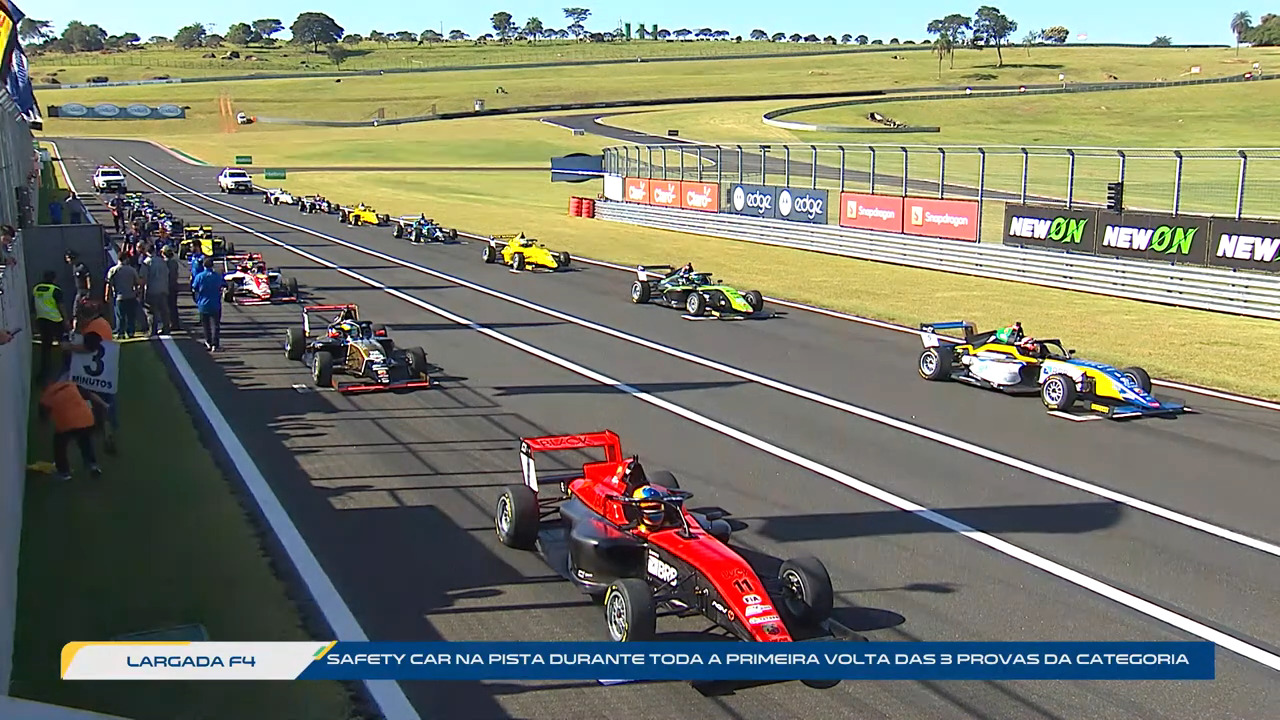
Start of the first race on May 14, 2022.

All pre-selected teams were Brazilian-registered and each fields 4 cars. Team allocation for the drivers was decided by a draw.

| Team | No. | Driver | Rounds |
|---|---|---|---|
| KTF Sports | 1 | (Brazil) Victor Backes | 1–4 |
| KTF Sports | 21 | (Brazil) Álvaro Cho | 2–6 |
| KTF Sports | 28 | (Brazil) Richard Annunziata | All |
| KTF Sports | 37 | (Argentina) Juan Francisco Soldavini | 6 |
| KTF Sports | 990 | (Brazil) Luan Lopes | All |
| Full Time Sports | 5 | (Brazil) Ricardo Gracia Filho | All |
| Full Time Sports | 33 | (Brazil) Nelson Neto | All |
| Full Time Sports | 41 | (Brazil) Fernando Barrichello | All |
| Full Time Sports | 69 | (Brazil) Pedro Clerot | All |
| TMG Racing | 9 | (Brazil) Lucca Zucchini | All |
| TMG Racing | 11 | (Brazil) Lucas Staico | All |
| TMG Racing | 16 | (Brazil) Aurelia Nobels | 1–4 |
| TMG Racing | 88 | (Brazil) Arthur Pavie | 5 |
| TMG Racing | 99 | (Brazil) Nicholas Monteiro | All |
| Cavaleiro Sports | 24 | (Brazil) Felipe Barrichello Bartz | All |
| Cavaleiro Sports | 29 | (Brazil) João Tesser | All |
| Cavaleiro Sports | 30 | (Brazil) Vinícius Tessaro | All |
| Cavaleiro Sports | 31 | (Brazil) Nicolas Giaffone | All |

== Race calendar ==
All rounds were held in Brazil and all but one supported the 2022 Stock Car Pro Series events. The schedule was revealed on 21 December 2021. The revised version was published on 5 May 2022. Further changes were announced on 30 June 2022. The postponement of the last two rounds, that included moving the round five to support the Copa Truck and the season finale from Autódromo Internacional Nelson Piquet (Brasília) to Autódromo José Carlos Pace, was announced on 5 October 2022.

| Round | | Circuit | Date | Pole position | Fastest lap | Winning driver | Winning team |
|---|---|---|---|---|---|---|---|
| 1 | R1 | Autódromo Velo Città, Mogi Guaçu | 14 May | (Brazil) Pedro Clerot | (Brazil) Pedro Clerot | (Brazil) Pedro Clerot | Full Time Sports |
| 1 | R2 | Autódromo Velo Città, Mogi Guaçu | 14 May | | (Brazil) Ricardo Gracia Filho | (Brazil) Ricardo Gracia Filho | Full Time Sports |
| 1 | R3 | Autódromo Velo Città, Mogi Guaçu | 15 May | (Brazil) Lucas Staico | (Brazil) Pedro Clerot | (Brazil) Pedro Clerot | Full Time Sports |
| 2 | R1 | Autódromo José Carlos Pace, São Paulo | 30 July | (Brazil) Pedro Clerot | (Brazil) Pedro Clerot | (Brazil) Pedro Clerot | Full Time Sports |
| 2 | R2 | Autódromo José Carlos Pace, São Paulo | 30 July | | (Brazil) Luan Lopes | (Brazil) Nicolas Giaffone | Cavaleiro Sports |
| 2 | R3 | Autódromo José Carlos Pace, São Paulo | 31 July | (Brazil) Pedro Clerot | (Brazil) Pedro Clerot | (Brazil) Pedro Clerot | Full Time Sports |
| 3 | R1 | Autódromo José Carlos Pace, São Paulo | 6 August | (Brazil) Pedro Clerot | (Brazil) Pedro Clerot (Note: Giaffone set the fastest lap but was disqualified from the race. Clerot inherited the fastest lap.) | (Brazil) Pedro Clerot | Full Time Sports |
| 3 | R2 | Autódromo José Carlos Pace, São Paulo | 6 August | | (Brazil) Fernando Barrichello | (Brazil) Fernando Barrichello | Full Time Sports |
| 3 | R3 | Autódromo José Carlos Pace, São Paulo | 7 August | (Brazil) Nicholas Monteiro | (Brazil) Lucas Staico | (Brazil) Lucas Staico | TMG Racing |
| 4 | R1 | Autódromo Velo Città, Mogi Guaçu | 3 September | (Brazil) Lucas Staico | (Brazil) Pedro Clerot | (Brazil) Pedro Clerot | Full Time Sports |
| 4 | R2 | Autódromo Velo Città, Mogi Guaçu | 3 September | | (Brazil) Nicolas Giaffone | (Brazil) Nicolas Giaffone | Cavaleiro Sports |
| 4 | R3 | Autódromo Velo Città, Mogi Guaçu | 4 September | (Brazil) Lucas Staico | (Brazil) Pedro Clerot | (Brazil) Lucas Staico | TMG Racing |
| 5 | R1 | Autódromo Internacional Ayrton Senna, Goiânia | 5 November | (Brazil) Felipe Barrichello Bartz | (Brazil) Felipe Barrichello Bartz | (Brazil) Felipe Barrichello Bartz | Cavaleiro Sports |
| 5 | R2 | Autódromo Internacional Ayrton Senna, Goiânia | 5 November | | (Brazil) Álvaro Cho | (Brazil) Nicolas Giaffone | Cavaleiro Sports |
| 5 | R3 | Autódromo Internacional Ayrton Senna, Goiânia | 6 November | (Brazil) Felipe Barrichello Bartz | (Brazil) Felipe Barrichello Bartz | (Brazil) Pedro Clerot | Full Time Sports |
| 6 | R1 | Autódromo José Carlos Pace, São Paulo | 10 December | (Brazil) Lucas Staico | (Brazil) Felipe Barrichello Bartz | (Brazil) Felipe Barrichello Bartz | Cavaleiro Sports |
| 6 | R2 | Autódromo José Carlos Pace, São Paulo | 10 December | | (Brazil) Lucas Staico | (Brazil) Fernando Barrichello | Full Time Sports |
| 6 | R3 | Autódromo José Carlos Pace, São Paulo | 11 December | (Brazil) Lucas Staico | (Brazil) Luan Lopes | (Brazil) Lucas Staico | TMG Racing |

== Championship standings ==
Points were awarded to the top ten classified finishers in 25-minute races and for the top eight classified finishers in 18-minute races. The final classification was obtained by dropping two worst results from the first five rounds of the championship.

| Races | Position, points per race | | | | | | | | | | |
|---|---|---|---|---|---|---|---|---|---|---|---|
| Races | **1st** | **2nd** | **3rd** | **4th** | **5th** | **6th** | **7th** | **8th** | **9th** | **10th** | **FL** |
| Qualifying | 2 | | | | | | | | | | |
| 25-minute races | 25 | 18 | 15 | 12 | 10 | 8 | 6 | 4 | 2 | 1 | 1 |
| 18-minute races | 15 | 12 | 10 | 8 | 6 | 4 | 2 | 1 | | | 1 |

=== Drivers' standings ===
| Pos | Driver | MOG1 | | | INT1 | | | INT2 | | | MOG2 | | | GYN | | | INT3 | | | Pts |
|---|---|---|---|---|---|---|---|---|---|---|---|---|---|---|---|---|---|---|---|---|
| 1 | (Brazil) Pedro Clerot | **1** | 4 | 1 | **1** | 2 | **1** | **1** | 4 | 2 | 1 | 8 | 2 | 2 | 9 | 1 | Ret | 11 | 5 | 275 |
| 2 | (Brazil) Lucas Staico | Ret | 5 | **2** | 2 | 6 | 3 | 4 | 15 | 1 | **2** | 7 | **1** | 3 | Ret | Ret | **4** | 3 | **1** | 213 |
| 3 | (Brazil) Vinícius Tessaro | 11 | 11 | 13 | 5 | 3 | 2 | 2 | 5 | 4 | 5 | 5 | 3 | 13† | 3 | 2 | 2 | Ret | 4 | 163 |
| 4 | (Brazil) Felipe Barrichello Bartz | 8 | 2 | 7 | Ret | 10 | 8 | 11 | 8 | 8 | 7 | 2 | 10 | **1** | 4 | **10** | 1 | 5 | 3 | 135 |
| 5 | (Brazil) Nicolas Giaffone | 3 | 7 | 10 | 3 | 1 | 10 | DSQ | 6 | 5 | 8 | 1 | Ret | 5 | 1 | 9 | 6 | 2 | Ret | 129 |
| 6 | (Brazil) Luan Lopes | 10 | 6 | 15 | 4 | 8 | 6 | 12 | 9 | 6 | 3 | 6 | 4 | 6 | 2 | 7 | 3 | 12 | 2 | 126 |
| 7 | (Brazil) Fernando Barrichello | 4 | 3 | 14† | 12 | 9 | 7 | 7 | 1 | 7 | 6 | 3 | 6 | 4 | 5 | 13 | 8 | 1 | 8 | 123 |
| 8 | (Brazil) Nicholas Monteiro | 2 | 9 | 4 | 11 | 14 | 11 | 3 | 3 | **3** | 12 | 14 | 11 | 12 | 12 | 5 | 7 | 6 | 6 | 100 |
| 9 | (Brazil) Ricardo Gracia Filho | 7 | 1 | 3 | 10 | 11 | 5 | 8 | NC | 11 | 4 | 4 | 5 | 10 | 11 | 4 | Ret | WD | WD | 95 |
| 10 | (Brazil) Nelson Neto | Ret | 13 | 6 | 6 | 4 | 12 | 9 | 7 | 9 | Ret | 10 | 9 | 11 | 10 | 14 | 5 | 4 | 7 | 56 |
| 11 | (Brazil) Richard Annunziata | 6 | 14 | 11 | DSQ | 13 | 4 | 6 | 14 | Ret | 10 | 9 | 7 | 7 | 6 | 6 | 9 | 10 | DSQ | 55 |
| 12 | (Brazil) Álvaro Cho | | | | Ret | 7 | 13 | 5 | 2 | 13† | Ret | 16† | 14 | Ret | 8 | 3 | Ret | 8 | 10 | 43 |
| 13 | (Brazil) Lucca Zucchini | 12 | 12 | 5 | 9 | 12 | 9 | 14 | 11 | 10 | 13 | 15 | Ret | 8 | 7 | 12 | 12 | 7 | 9 | 25 |
| 14 | (Brazil) João Tesser | 9 | 10 | 8 | 8 | 5 | 14 | Ret | 13 | Ret | 11 | 11 | 13 | DSQ | 13 | 8 | 11 | 9 | 11 | 20 |
| 15 | (Brazil) Victor Backes | 5 | 8 | 9 | 7 | 16 | 15 | 13 | 12 | Ret | Ret | 13 | 12 | | | | | | | 19 |
| 16 | (Brazil) Aurelia Nobels | Ret | 15† | 12 | 13 | 15 | 16 | 10 | 10 | 12 | 9 | 12 | 8 | | | | | | | 7 |
| 17 | (Brazil) Arthur Pavie | | | | | | | | | | | | | 9 | 14 | 11 | | | | 2 |
| 18 | (Argentina) Francisco Soldavini | | | | | | | | | | | | | | | | 10 | Ret | DNS | 1 |

| Colour | Result |
|---|---|
| Gold | Winner |
| Silver | Second place |
| Bronze | Third place |
| Green | Points classification |
| Blue | Non-points classification |
| Blue | Non-classified finish (NC) |
| Purple | Retired, not classified (Ret) |
| Red | Did not qualify (DNQ) |
| Red | Did not pre-qualify (DNPQ) |
| Black | Disqualified (DSQ) |
| White | Did not start (DNS) |
| White | Withdrew (WD) |
| White | Race cancelled (C) |
| Blank | Did not practice (DNP) |
| Blank | Did not arrive (DNA) |
| Blank | Excluded (EX) |

**Bold** – Pole
Italics – Fastest Lap
† — Did not finish but classified

=== Teams' championship ===
Each team acquired the points earned by their two best drivers in each race.

| Pos | Driver | MOG1 | | | INT1 | | | INT2 | | | MOG2 | | | GYN | | | INT3 | | | Pts |
|---|---|---|---|---|---|---|---|---|---|---|---|---|---|---|---|---|---|---|---|---|
| 1 | Full Time Sports | **1** | 1 | 1 | **1** | 2 | **1**^{Q} | **1** | 1 | 2 | 1 | 3 | 2 | 2 | 5 | 1 | 5 | 1 | 5 | 488 |
| 1 | Full Time Sports | 4 | 3 | 3 | 6 | 4 | 5 | 7 | 4 | 7 | 4 | 4 | 5 | 4 | 9 | 4 | 8 | 4 | 7 | 488 |
| 2 | Cavaleiro Sports | 3 | 2 | 7 | 3 | 1 | 2 | 2 | 5 | 4 | 5 | 1 | 3 | **1** | 1 | 2 | 1 | 2 | 3 | 400 |
| 2 | Cavaleiro Sports | 8 | 7 | 8 | 5 | 3 | 8 | 11 | 6 | 5 | 7 | 2 | 10 | 5 | 3 | 8 | 2 | 5 | 4 | 400 |
| 3 | TMG Racing | 2 | 5 | **2**^{Q} | 2 | 6 | 3 | 3 | 3 | 1 | **2** | 7 | **1**^{Q} | 3 | 7 | 5 | **4** | 3 | **1**^{Q} | 329 |
| 3 | TMG Racing | 12 | 9 | 4 | 9 | 12 | 9 | 4 | 10 | **3**^{Q} | 9 | 12 | 8 | 8 | 12 | 11 | 7 | 6 | 6 | 329 |
| 4 | KTF Sports | 5 | 6 | 9 | 4 | 7 | 4 | 5 | 2 | 6 | 3 | 6 | 4 | 6 | 2 | 3 | 3 | 8 | 2 | 235 |
| 4 | KTF Sports | 6 | 8 | 11 | 7 | 8 | 6 | 6 | 9 | 13† | 10 | 9 | 7 | 7 | 6 | 6 | 9 | 10 | 10 | 235 |
