= 2024 F4 Brazilian Championship =

Brazilian motorsports competition

The 2024 F4 Brazilian Championship was the third season of the F4 Brazilian Championship. It was a multi-event motor racing championship for open wheel, formula racing cars regulated according to FIA Formula 4 regulations.

== Teams and drivers ==
All pre-selected teams were Brazilian-registered.

Team	No.	Driver	Class	Rounds
Cavaleiro Sports	1	(Brazil) Alceu Feldmann Neto	R	5, 7–8
Cavaleiro Sports	7	(Brazil) Rogério Grotta	R	All
Cavaleiro Sports	9	(Brazil) Lucca Zucchini		All
Cavaleiro Sports	12	(Brazil) Ethan Nobels	R	All
Cavaleiro Sports	27	(Brazil) João Pedro Souza	R	All
Oakberry Bassani F4	1	(Brazil) Alceu Feldmann Neto	R	4
Oakberry Bassani F4	16	(Brazil) Alexander Jacoby (Note: Jacoby is an American-Brazilian driver competing under a Brazilian licence.)		8
Oakberry Bassani F4	48	(Argentina) Gino Trappa	R	All
Oakberry Bassani F4	55	(Brazil) Murilo Rocha	R	7–8
Oakberry Bassani F4	98	(Brazil) Cecília Rabelo		All
Oakberry Bassani F4	118	(Brazil) Matheus Comparatto		All
TMG Racing	18	(Brazil) Rafaela Ferreira		All
TMG Racing	21	(Brazil) Álvaro Cho		1, 3–8
TMG Racing	30	(Brazil) Guilherme Favarete	R	1–4
TMG Racing	37	(Brazil) Filippo Fiorentino		2, 6–8
TMG Racing	71	(Brazil) Ciro Sobral	R	All
TMG Racing	88	(Brazil) Arthur Pavie		3–8
TMG Racing	00	(Brazil) Celo Hahn	R	6–8

Icon	Class
R	Rookie

== Race calendar ==
The schedule was revealed on 1 December 2023. All but one round ran alongside the 2024 São Paulo Grand Prix support 2024 Stock Car Pro Series events. For the first time in the championship history, one round was held abroad in Argentina. On 25 September 2024, it was announced that the second Goiânia round replaced the planned round at Autódromo Brasília BRB.

Round		Circuit	Date	Pole position	Fastest lap	Winning driver	Winning team	Rookie winner
1	R1	(Brazil) Autódromo Velo Città, Mogi Guaçu	23 March	(Brazil) Álvaro Cho	(Brazil) Álvaro Cho	(Brazil) Álvaro Cho	TMG Racing	(Brazil) Ethan Nobels
1	R2	(Brazil) Autódromo Velo Città, Mogi Guaçu	23 March		(Brazil) Ethan Nobels	(Brazil) Ethan Nobels	Cavaleiro Sports	(Brazil) Ethan Nobels
1	R3	(Brazil) Autódromo Velo Città, Mogi Guaçu	24 March	(Brazil) Álvaro Cho	(Brazil) Álvaro Cho	(Brazil) Matheus Comparatto	Oakberry Bassani F4	(Argentina) Gino Trappa
2	R1	(Brazil) Interlagos Circuit, São Paulo	20 April	(Brazil) Rafaela Ferreira	(Brazil) Rafaela Ferreira	(Brazil) Filippo Fiorentino	TMG Racing	(Brazil) Ethan Nobels
2	R2	(Brazil) Interlagos Circuit, São Paulo	20 April		(Brazil) Rafaela Ferreira	(Argentina) Gino Trappa	Oakberry Bassani F4	(Argentina) Gino Trappa
2	R3	(Brazil) Interlagos Circuit, São Paulo	21 April	(Brazil) Rafaela Ferreira	(Brazil) Matheus Comparatto	(Brazil) Matheus Comparatto	Oakberry Bassani F4	(Brazil) Ethan Nobels
3	R1	(Brazil) Autódromo Velo Città, Mogi Guaçu	29 June	(Brazil) Matheus Comparatto	(Brazil) Arthur Pavie (Note: Both Arthur Pavie and Ethan Nobels set the same fastest lap of the race. The bonus point was awarded to Pavie who set it first.)	(Brazil) Matheus Comparatto	Oakberry Bassani F4	(Brazil) Ethan Nobels
3	R2	(Brazil) Autódromo Velo Città, Mogi Guaçu	29 June		(Brazil) Arthur Pavie	(Brazil) Rafaela Ferreira	TMG Racing	(Brazil) Ethan Nobels
3	R3	(Brazil) Autódromo Velo Città, Mogi Guaçu	30 June	(Brazil) Álvaro Cho	(Brazil) Arthur Pavie	(Brazil) Álvaro Cho	TMG Racing	(Brazil) Ethan Nobels
4	R1	(Brazil) Autódromo Internacional Ayrton Senna, Goiânia	27 July	(Brazil) Arthur Pavie	(Brazil) Álvaro Cho	(Brazil) Álvaro Cho	TMG Racing	(Argentina) Gino Trappa
4	R2	(Brazil) Autódromo Internacional Ayrton Senna, Goiânia	27 July		(Brazil) Arthur Pavie	(Brazil) Ethan Nobels	Cavaleiro Sports	(Brazil) Ethan Nobels
4	R3	(Brazil) Autódromo Internacional Ayrton Senna, Goiânia	28 July	(Brazil) Arthur Pavie	(Brazil) Rogério Grotta	(Brazil) Arthur Pavie	TMG Racing	(Brazil) Ciro Sobral
5	R1	(Argentina) Autódromo Oscar y Juan Gálvez, Buenos Aires	4 October	(Brazil) Arthur Pavie	(Brazil) Arthur Pavie	(Brazil) Arthur Pavie	TMG Racing	(Brazil) Ethan Nobels
5	R2	(Argentina) Autódromo Oscar y Juan Gálvez, Buenos Aires	5 October		(Brazil) Rogério Grotta	(Brazil) Rafaela Ferreira	TMG Racing	(Brazil) Rogério Grotta
5	R3	(Argentina) Autódromo Oscar y Juan Gálvez, Buenos Aires	6 October	(Brazil) Ethan Nobels	(Argentina) Gino Trappa	(Brazil) Ethan Nobels	Cavaleiro Sports	(Brazil) Ethan Nobels
6	R1	(Brazil) Interlagos Circuit, São Paulo	2 November	(Brazil) Ethan Nobels	(Argentina) Gino Trappa	(Brazil) Matheus Comparatto	Oakberry Bassani F4	(Brazil) João Pedro Souza
6	R2	(Brazil) Interlagos Circuit, São Paulo	2 November	race cancelled due to adverse weather conditions, rescheduled to 12 December				
6	R3	(Brazil) Interlagos Circuit, São Paulo	3 November	(Brazil) Ethan Nobels	(Brazil) Matheus Comparatto (Note: Comparatto set the fastest lap but was initially disqualified for the technical irregularities with Cho inheriting the fastest lap. The decision was reverted.)	(Brazil) Álvaro Cho	TMG Racing	(Brazil) Ethan Nobels
7	R1	(Brazil) Autódromo Internacional Ayrton Senna, Goiânia	23 November	(Brazil) Matheus Comparatto	(Argentina) Gino Trappa	(Brazil) Álvaro Cho	TMG Racing	(Argentina) Gino Trappa
7	R2	(Brazil) Autódromo Internacional Ayrton Senna, Goiânia	23 November		(Brazil) Arthur Pavie	(Brazil) Lucca Zucchini	Cavaleiro Sports	(Argentina) Gino Trappa
7	R3	(Brazil) Autódromo Internacional Ayrton Senna, Goiânia	24 November	(Brazil) Matheus Comparatto	(Brazil) Matheus Comparatto	(Brazil) Matheus Comparatto	Oakberry Bassani F4	(Brazil) Ethan Nobels
8	R2	(Brazil) Interlagos Circuit, São Paulo	12 December		(Brazil) Filippo Fiorentino	(Brazil) Rafaela Ferreira	TMG Racing	(Brazil) Ethan Nobels
8	R1	(Brazil) Interlagos Circuit, São Paulo	13 December	(Brazil) Matheus Comparatto	(Argentina) Gino Trappa	(Brazil) Álvaro Cho	TMG Racing	(Brazil) João Pedro Souza
8	R2	(Brazil) Interlagos Circuit, São Paulo	14 December		(Argentina) Gino Trappa	(Brazil) Rogério Grotta	Cavaleiro Sports	(Brazil) Rogério Grotta
8	R3	(Brazil) Interlagos Circuit, São Paulo	14 December	(Brazil) Álvaro Cho	(Argentina) Gino Trappa	(Brazil) Álvaro Cho	TMG Racing	(Argentina) Gino Trappa

== Championship standings ==
Points were awarded to the top ten classified finishers in 30-minute races and for the top eight classified finishers in 20-minute races. The final individual classifications were obtained by dropping two worst scores from the first twenty one held races.

Races	Position, points per race										
Races	**1st**	**2nd**	**3rd**	**4th**	**5th**	**6th**	**7th**	**8th**	**9th**	**10th**	**FL**
Qualifying	2										
30-minute races	25	18	15	12	10	8	6	4	2	1	1
20-minute races	15	12	10	8	6	4	2	1			1

=== Drivers' standings ===
Pos	Driver	(Brazil) MGG1			(Brazil) INT1			(Brazil) MGG2			(Brazil) GOI1			(Argentina) BUA			(Brazil) INT2			(Brazil) GOI2			(Brazil) INT3				Pts
1	(Brazil) Matheus Comparatto	4	8	1	4	2	1	**1**	4	3	2	5	3	3	10†	8	1	C	3	**3**	6	**1**	2	**2**	4	2	337
2	(Brazil) Álvaro Cho	**1**	3	**10**				6	2	**1**	1	2	2	4	4	3	6	C	1	1	8	2	Ret	1	9	**1**	307
3	(Brazil) Ethan Nobels	5	1	11	5	5	2	3	3	4	7	1	10	2	9	**1**	**Ret**	C	**2**	4	7	4	4	5	5	8	238
4	(Brazil) Rafaela Ferreira	3	7	2	**2**	8	**9**	8	1	8	3	8	5	7	1	2	7	C	8	7	2	5	1	7	2	7	222
5	(Argentina) Gino Trappa	11	9	3	7	1	3	4	5	7	5	4	9	Ret	5	11	3	C	Ret	2	4	8	Ret	6	3	4	182
6	(Brazil) Arthur Pavie							2	6	2	**11**	7	**1**	**1**	Ret	12	Ret	C	4	5	5	3	3	4	7	6	175
7	(Brazil) Rogério Grotta	7	5	4	6	3	5	9	9	9	Ret	11	8	6	2	4	4	C	7	13†	10	12	6	8	1	5	145
8	(Brazil) Lucca Zucchini	2	6	8	3	Ret	10	7	7	Ret	4	12	4	Ret	7	7	8	C	5	8	1	11	Ret	10	8	13	117
9	(Brazil) Ciro Sobral	8	2	5	8	6	4	12	Ret	5	6	3	6	5	3	9	9	C	10	9	11	13	Ret	11	12	11	109
10	(Brazil) Filippo Fiorentino				1	4	Ret										5	C	6	6	3	6	5	9	6	3	105
11	(Brazil) João Pedro Souza	10	10	6	Ret	9	7	11	8	10	8	Ret	12	10	8	5	2	C	9	11	Ret	Ret	7	3	11	14	70
12	(Brazil) Guilherme Favarete	9	Ret	7	Ret	10†	6	5	Ret	6	Ret	6	7														44
13	(Brazil) Cecília Rabelo	6	4	9	9	7	8	10	Ret	Ret	10†	9	11	9	Ret	6	11	C	Ret	10	9	10	Ret	15	DSQ	12	40
14	(Brazil) Alceu Feldmann Neto										9	10	13	8	6	10				12	13	9		12	15	Ret	13
15	(Brazil) Celo Hahn																10	C	DNS	Ret	12	7	8	14	13	10	9
16	(Brazil) Murilo Rocha																							16	14	9	2
17	(Brazil) Alexander Jacoby																							13	10	Ret	0

Colour	Result
Gold	Winner
Silver	Second place
Bronze	Third place
Green	Points classification
Blue	Non-points classification
Blue	Non-classified finish (NC)
Purple	Retired, not classified (Ret)
Red	Did not qualify (DNQ)
Red	Did not pre-qualify (DNPQ)
Black	Disqualified (DSQ)
White	Did not start (DNS)
White	Withdrew (WD)
White	Race cancelled (C)
Blank	Did not practice (DNP)
Blank	Did not arrive (DNA)
Blank	Excluded (EX)

**Bold** – Pole
Italics – Fastest Lap
† — Did not finish but classified

=== Rookies' championship ===
Pos	Driver	(Brazil) MGG1			(Brazil) INT1			(Brazil) MGG2			(Brazil) GOI1			(Argentina) BUA			(Brazil) INT2			(Brazil) GOI2			(Brazil) INT3				Pts
1	(Brazil) Ethan Nobels	**1**	1	**6**	1	3	1	**1**	1	**1**	3	1	5	**1**	6	**1**	**Ret**	C	**1**	2	2	**1**	1	2	3	3	420
2	(Argentina) Gino Trappa	6	4	1	**3**	1	2	2	2	4	1	3	4	Ret	3	6	2	C	Ret	**1**	1	3	Ret	3	2	1	330
3	(Brazil) Rogério Grotta	2	3	2	2	2	4	4	4	5	Ret	6	3	3	1	2	3	C	2	6†	3	5	2	4	1	2	302
4	(Brazil) Ciro Sobral	3	2	3	4	4	**3**	6	Ret	2	**2**	2	**1**	2	2	4	4	C	4	3	4	6	Ret	5	5	6	284
5	(Brazil) João Pedro Souza	5	5	4	Ret	5	6	5	3	6	4	Ret	6	5	5	3	1	C	3	4	Ret	Ret	3	**1**	4	**7**	224
6	(Brazil) Guilherme Favarete	4	Ret	5	Ret	6†	5	3	Ret	3	Ret	4	2														93
7	(Brazil) Alceu Feldmann Neto										5	5	7	4	4	5				5	6	4		6	8	Ret	87
8	(Brazil) Celo Hahn																5	C	DNS	Ret	5	2	4	7	6	5	62
9	(Brazil) Murilo Rocha																							8	7	4	18

=== Teams' championship ===
Each team acquired the points earned by their two best drivers in each race.

Pos	Team	(Brazil) MGG1			(Brazil) INT1			(Brazil) MGG2			(Brazil) GOI1			(Argentina) BUA			(Brazil) INT2			(Brazil) GOI2			(Brazil) INT3				Pts
1	TMG Racing	**1**	2	2	1	4	4	2	1	**1**	1	2	**1**	**1**	1	2	5	C	1	1	2	2	1	1	2	**1**	738
1	TMG Racing	3	3	5	**2**	6	6	5	2	2	3	3	2	4	3	3	6	C	4	5	3	3	3	4	6	3	738
2	Oakberry Bassani F4	4	4	1	4	1	1	**1**	4	3	2	4	3	3	5	6	1	C	3	2	4	**1**	2	**2**	3	2	545
2	Oakberry Bassani F4	6	8	3	7	2	3	4	5	7	5	5	9	9	10†	8	3	C	Ret	**3**	6	8	Ret	6	4	4	545
3	Cavaleiro Sports	2	1	4	3	3	2	3	3	4	4	1	4	2	2	**1**	2	C	**2**	4	1	4	4	3	1	5	497
3	Cavaleiro Sports	5	5	6	5	5	5	7	7	9	7	11	8	6	6	4	4	C	5	8	7	9	6	5	5	8	497
