= Nicholas Monteiro =

Brazilian racing driver (born 2005)

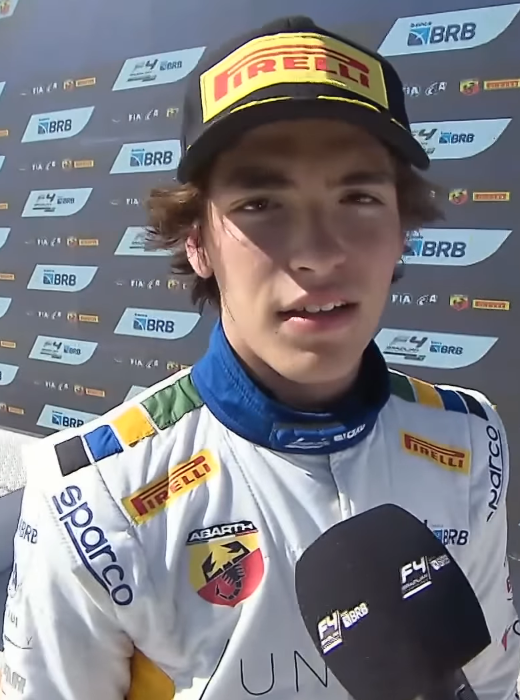
- Monteiro in 2022
- Nationality: (Brazil) Brazilian (United States) American
- Born: Nicholas Codicasa Monteiro; 20 October 2005 (age 21) Pembroke Pines, Florida, U.S.

Indy NXT career
- Debut season: 2025
- Current team: A.J. Foyt Enterprises
- Car number: 4
- Former teams: HMD Motorsports
- Starts: 18
- Wins: 0
- Podiums: 0
- Poles: 0
- Fastest laps: 0
- Best finish: 24th in 2026

Previous series
- 2025 2025 2024 2023–2025 2022 2022 2022: Lamborghini Super Trofeo North America; FR Oceania; NASCAR Brasil Series; USF Pro 2000; Italian F4; F4 Brazilian; Copa Brasil de Fórmula Delta

Nicholas Codicasa Monteiro (born 20 October 2005 in Pembroke Pines) is a Brazilian and American racing who last competed in Indy NXT for A. J. Foyt Racing.

Born in Pembroke Pines, Florida, Monteiro started his single-seater career in 2022, competing in Brazilian F4. He then competed in the USF Pro 2000 Championship from 2023 to 2025.

== Career ==
=== Karting ===
Monteiro started out in karts at the age of seven, competing in the Mirim class of the 14th Copa Brasil series. Moving up to the Sprinter class in 2020, Monteiro continued karting until 2022, last competing in the Brazilian KZ Championship in the KZ Graduados class.

=== Formula 4 ===
Having been announced as one of the fifteen drivers set to compete in the inaugural season of the F4 Brazilian Championship, Monteiro was confirmed to be joining TMG Racing following a draw which decided the team and driver combinations. Finishing second in the season-opener, Monteiro finished third in all three races of the second Interlagos round, on his way to eighth in the standings at season's end.

During 2022, Monteiro also competed in two rounds of the Italian F4 Championship for Cram Motorsport, scoring a best result of 26th in race two at Vallelunga.

=== USF Pro 2000 Championship ===
==== 2023 ====
In 2023, Monteiro joined NeoTech Motorsport's single car-operation in the USF Pro 2000 Championship, with technical support from TJ Speed Motorsports. Scoring a best result of eleventh twice, at Toronto, Monteiro joined TJ Speed Motorsports for the final round at Portland. Following a crash in race one, Monteiro was unable to compete for the rest of the weekend and ended his maiden season in USF Pro 2000 nineteenth in points.

==== 2024 ====
Monteiro joined DEForce Racing in late 2023 for his sophomore season in the USF Pro 2000 Championship alongside Mac Clark and Jorge Garciarce. Taking a best result of seventh in race two at Toronto, Monteiro ended the season thirteenth in points after collecting four more top-ten finishes.

==== 2025 ====
Monteiro returned for a third season in the USF Pro 2000 Championship for DEForce Racing alongside Jorge Garciarce as the team scaled back to two cars. After scoring just two top-tens in the first two rounds, Monteiro switched to Turn 3 Motorsport, driving the No. 22 entry, previously driven by Elliot Cox. In the following five rounds, Monteiro scored a best result of sixth six times, en route to a tenth-place points finish despite missing the final round at Portland.

=== Indy NXT ===
==== 2025 ====
In August, Monteiro joined HMD Motorsports to make his Indy NXT debut at the third-to-last round at Portland, finishing 14th on his debut.

==== 2026 ====
In 2026, Monteiro stepped up to Indy NXT full-time with A. J. Foyt Racing. In his rookie season in the series, Monteiro took a best result of 14th at Barber to end the season 23rd overall.

=== Other racing ===
==== 2024 ====
Alongside his commitments in USF Pro 2000, Monteiro competed in the second season of the NASCAR Brasil Sprint Race series in the Challenge class. On a part-time schedule, he scored a lone class win at Autodromo Potenza.

==== 2025 ====
In early 2025, Monteiro made his debut in Formula Regional machinery, joining mtec Motorsport to compete in the Formula Regional Oceania Championship. At the final round of the season at Highlands Motorsport Park, Monteiro scored his only podium of the season, finishing second in the reverse-grid race behind Nikita Johnson. Monteiro also returned to the newly-rebranded NASCAR Brasil Series for 2025, joining MX Vogel for his sophomore season in the series.

== Racing record ==
=== Racing career summary ===
Season	Series	Team	Races	Wins	Poles	F/Laps	Podiums	Points	Position
2022	Copa Brasil de Fórmula Delta		2	0	0	0	1	16	10th
2022	F4 Brazilian Championship	TMG Racing	18	0	1	0	4	100	8th
2022	Italian F4 Championship	Cram Motorsport	6	0	0	0	0	0	54th
2023	USF Pro 2000 Championship	NeoTech Motorsport	15	0	0	0	0	106	19th
2023	USF Pro 2000 Championship	TJ Speed Motorsports	3	0	0	0	0	106	19th
2024	USF Pro 2000 Championship	DEForce Racing	18	0	0	0	0	162	13th
2024	NASCAR Brasil Sprint Race - Challenge	N/A	8	1	4	0	0	172	7th
2025	Formula Regional Oceania Championship	mtec Motorsport	15	0	0	0	1	132	12th
2025	USF Pro 2000 Championship	DEForce Racing	5	0	0	0	0	185	10th
2025	USF Pro 2000 Championship	Turn 3 Motorsport	11	0	0	0	0	185	10th
2025	NASCAR Brasil Series – Challenge	MX Vogel	8	0	0	0	2	90	10th
2025	Indy NXT	HMD Motorsports	1	0	0	0	0	16	27th
2025	Lamborghini Super Trofeo North America – Pro-Am	RAFA Racing Team	2	0	1	0	0	15	16th
2026	Indy NXT	A. J. Foyt Racing	17	0	0	0	0	179	23rd

=== Complete F4 Brazilian Championship results ===
(key) (Races in bold indicate pole position) (Races in italics indicate fastest lap)

Year	Team	1	2	3	4	5	6	7	8	9	10	11	12	13	14	15	16	17	18	DC	Points
2022	TMG Racing	MOG1; 1; 2	MOG1; 2; 9	MOG1; 3; 4	INT1; 1; 11	INT1; 2; 14	INT1; 3; 11	INT2; 1; 3	INT2; 2; 3	**INT2**; **3**; 3	MOG2; 1; 12	MOG2; 2; 14	MOG2; 3; 11	GYN; 1; 12	GYN; 2; 12	GYN; 3; 5	INT3; 1; 7	INT3; 2; 6	INT3; 3; 6	8th	100

=== Complete Italian F4 Championship results ===
(key) (Races in bold indicate pole position) (Races in italics indicate fastest lap)

Year	Team	1	2	3	4	5	6	7	8	9	10	11	12	13	14	15	16	17	18	19	20	21	22	DC	Points
2022	Cram Motorsport	IMO; 1	IMO; 2	IMO; 3	MIS; 1	MIS; 2	MIS; 3	SPA; 1; 30	SPA; 2; 29	SPA; 3; 31	VLL; 1; 34	VLL; 2; 26	VLL; 3; 31†	RBR; 1	RBR; 2	RBR; 3	RBR; 4	MNZ; 1	MNZ; 2	MNZ; 3	MUG; 1	MUG; 2	MUG; 3	54th	0

=== American open-wheel racing results ===
==== USF Pro 2000 Championship ====
(key) (Races in bold indicate pole position) (Races in italics indicate fastest lap) (Races with * indicate most race laps led)

Year	Team	1	2	3	4	5	6	7	8	9	10	11	12	13	14	15	16	17	18	Rank	Points
2023	NeoTech Motorsport	STP; 1; 19	STP; 2; 13	SEB; 1; 17	SEB; 2; 15	IMS; 1; 14	IMS; 2; 16	IRP; 13	ROA; 1; 20	ROA; 2; 12	MOH; 1; 12	MOH; 2; 16	TOR; 1; 11	TOR; 2; 11	COTA; 1; 15	COTA; 1; 16				19th	106
2023	TJ Speed Motorsports																POR; 1; 19	POR; 2; 18	POR; 3; 19	19th	106
2024	DEForce Racing	STP; 1; 12	STP; 2; 15	LOU; 1; 16	LOU; 2; 15	LOU; 3; 17	IMS; 1; 13	IMS; 2; 8	IMS; 3; 16	IRP; 12	ROA; 1; 11	ROA; 2; 11	ROA; 3; 9	MOH; 1; 17	MOH; 2; 11	TOR; 1; 10	TOR; 2; 7	POR; 1; 11	POR; 2; 10	13th	162
2025	DEForce Racing	STP; 1; 7	STP; 2; 13	LOU; 1; 15	LOU; 2; 15	LOU; 3; 10														10th	185
2025	Turn 3 Motorsport						IMS; 1; 6	IMS; 2; 6	IMS; 3; 6	IRP; 6	ROA; 1; 17	ROA; 2; 12	ROA; 3; 6	MOH; 1; 6	MOH; 2; 15	TOR; 1; 12	TOR; 2; 7	POR; 1	POR; 2	10th	185

==== Indy NXT ====
(key) (Races in bold indicate pole position) (Races in italics indicate fastest lap) (Races with ^{L} indicate a race lap led) (Races with * indicate most race laps led)

Year	Team	1	2	3	4	5	6	7	8	9	10	11	12	13	14	15	16	17	Rank	Points
2025	HMD Motorsports	STP	BAR	IMS	IMS	DET	GMP	RDA	MOH	IOW	LAG	LAG	POR; 14	MIL	NSH				27th	16
2026	A. J. Foyt Racing	STP; 23	ARL; 22	BAR; 14	BAR; 19	IMS; 18	IMS; 18	DET; 17	GAT; 15	ROA; 19	ROA; 24	MOH; 18	MOH; 21	NSS; 17	POR; 19	MIL; 17	LAG; 24	LAG; 20	23rd	179

=== Complete Formula Regional Oceania Championship results ===
(key) (Races in bold indicate pole position) (Races in italics indicate fastest lap)

Year	Team	1	2	3	4	5	6	7	8	9	10	11	12	13	14	15	DC	Points
2025	mtec Motorsport	TAU; 1; 12	TAU; 2; 11	TAU; 3; 13	HMP; 1 DSQ	HMP; 2; 14	HMP; 3; 14	MAN; 1; 9	MAN; 2; 5	MAN; 3; 13	TER; 1; 11	TER; 2; 12	TER; 3; 13	HIG; 1; 7	HIG; 2; 2	HIG; 3; 12	12th	132
