= Álvaro Cho =

Brazilian racing driver (born 2007)

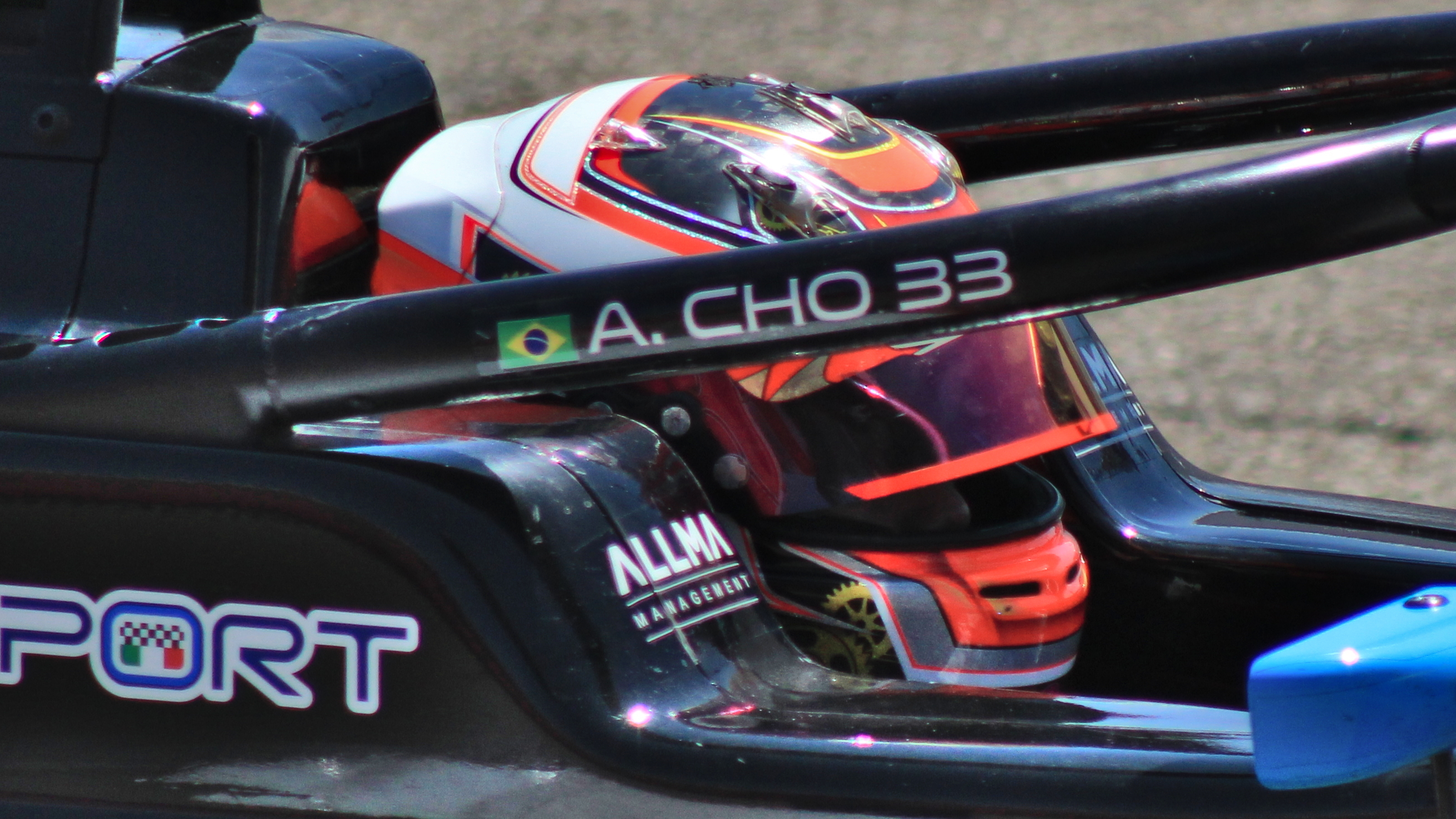
- Cho in 2024
- Nationality: (Brazil) Brazilian
- Born: Álvaro Yoon Cho; 27 June 2007 (age 19) São Paulo, Brazil

Álvaro Yoon Cho (born 27 June 2007 in São Paulo) is a Brazilian racing driver of South Korean descent who last competed in the F4 Brazilian Championship for TMG Racing.

== Career ==
Cho started karting during 2019, and spent two years in it, mainly racing in Brazil along with a one-off appearance in the WSK Open Cup in 2021.

After testing Formula 4 machinery at Adria in late 2021 for Cram Motorsport, Cho joined the inaugural season of the F4 Brazilian Championship with TMG Racing. Joining the season after his fifteenth birthday at Interlagos, Cho scored his first podium the following round at the same track in the reverse-grid race two by finishing runner-up to Fernando Barrichello. At the penultimate round of the season in Goiania, Cho took his second and final podium of the season in race three, which led to him finishing 12th in the standings at season's end.

Returning to the series in 2023 but switching to TMG Racing shortly before the season-opener, He started the season with a triple podium at Interlagos, which included a pole in race three and two-runner up finishes in the last two races. Three rounds later, at Goiania, he scored his maiden series win in race one. After scoring two more podiums in the last two rounds of the season, both at Interlagos, Cho ended his sophomore season in the series third in points.

In 2024, Cho returned to the F4 Brazilian Championship after another last-minute call from TMG Racing. Having initially signed on just for the season opener at Velo Città, Cho won the first race of the weekend and left the round as the points leader. However, things changed when Cho returned to TMG Racing for the third round of the season at Velo Città until the end of the season, taking a win in race three on his surprise return. In the following round of the season at Goiania, Cho won race one and finished second in the other two to enter the second half of the season runner-up in points. Taking just one podium in the series' only trip to Argentina, Cho took four wins in the last three rounds of the season to end his third season in Brazilian F4 runner-up to Matheus Comparatto.

During 2024, Cho made his Formula Regional debut, joining G4 Racing ahead of the Mugello round of the Formula Regional European Championship. Racing in just two rounds for the Swiss-licensed team, he took a best result of 22nd at the Paul Ricard round in race one.

== Karting record ==
=== Karting career summary ===
Season	Series	Team	Position
2021	WSK Open Cup - OKJ	KR Motorsport	75th

== Racing record ==
=== Racing career summary ===
Season	Series	Team	Races	Wins	Poles	F/Laps	Podiums	Points	Position
2022	F4 Brazilian Championship	KTF Sports	15	0	0	1	2	43	12th
2022	Campeonato Paulista de Fórmula Delta		2	0	1	1	1	12	18th
2023	F4 Brazilian Championship	TMG Racing	18	1	2	1	8	204	3rd
2024	F4 Brazilian Championship	TMG Racing	21	7	4	4	13	307	2nd
2024	Formula Regional European Championship	G4 Racing	4	0	0	0	0	0	37th

=== Complete F4 Brazilian Championship results ===
(key) (Races in bold indicate pole position; races in italics indicate fastest lap)

Year	Team	1	2	3	4	5	6	7	8	9	10	11	12	13	14	15	16	17	18	19	20	21	22	23	24	25	DC	Points
2022	KTF Sports	MOG1; 1	MOG1; 2	MOG1; 3	INT1; 1 Ret	INT1; 2; 7	INT1; 3; 13	INT2; 1; 5	INT2; 2; 2	INT2; 3; 13†	MOG2; 1 Ret	MOG2; 2; 16†	MOG2; 3; 14	GYN; 1 Ret	GYN; 2; 8	GYN; 3; 3	INT3; 1 Ret	INT3; 2; 8	INT3; 3; 10								12th	43
2023	TMG Racing	INT1; 1; 3	INT1; 2; 2	**INT1**; **3**; 2	INT2; 1; 9	INT2; 2; 6	INT2; 3; 4	MOG; 1; 4	MOG; 2; 8	MOG; 3; 2	**GYN**; **1**; 1	GYN; 2; 6	GYN; 3; 2	INT3; 1; 3	INT3; 2; 7	INT3; 3; 5	INT4; 1; 4	INT4; 2; 2	INT4; 3; 4								3rd	204
2024	TMG Racing	**MGG1**; **1**; 1	MGG1; 2; 3	**MGG1**; **3**; 10	INT1; 1	INT1; 2	INT1; 3	MGG2; 1; 6	MGG2; 2; 2	**MGG2**; **3**; 1	GOI1; 1; 1	GOI1; 2; 2	GOI1; 3; 2	BUA; 1; 4	BUA; 2; 4	BUA; 3; 3	INT2; 1; 6	INT2; 2 C	INT2; 3; 1	GOI2; 1; 1	GOI2; 2; 8	GOI2; 3; 2	INT3; 1 Ret	INT3; 2; 1	INT3; 3; 9	**INT3**; **4**; 1	2nd	307

=== Complete Formula Regional European Championship results ===
(key) (Races in bold indicate pole position) (Races in italics indicate fastest lap)

Year	Team	1	2	3	4	5	6	7	8	9	10	11	12	13	14	15	16	17	18	19	20	DC	Points
2024	G4 Racing	HOC; 1	HOC; 2	SPA; 1	SPA; 2	ZAN; 1	ZAN; 2	HUN; 1	HUN; 2	MUG; 1; 29	MUG; 2; 30	LEC; 1; 22	LEC; 2; 24	IMO; 1	IMO; 2	RBR; 1	RBR; 2	CAT; 1	CAT; 2	MNZ; 1	MNZ; 2	37th	0
