= Gino Trappa =

Argentine racing driver (born 2008)

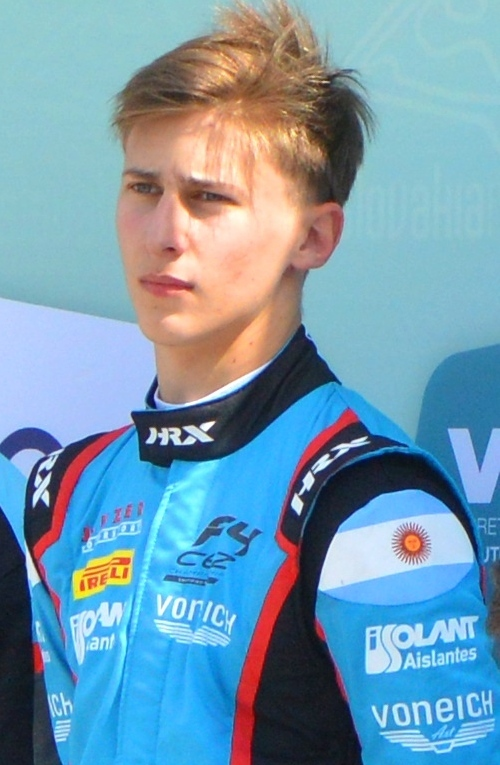
- Trappa in 2025
- Born: Genaro Trappa; 18 April 2008 (age 18); San Isidro, Buenos Aires, Argentina
- Nationality: (Argentina) Argentine

Eurocup-3 career
- Debut season: 2026
- Current team: Hitech
- Car number: 84
- Starts: 19
- Wins: 0
- Podiums: 1
- Poles: 0
- Fastest laps: 0
- Best finish: 14th in 2026

Previous series
- 2026 2025–2026 2025 2025 2025 2024–2025 2024: Eurocup-3 Spanish Winter; Euroformula Open; F4 CEZ; Formula Winter Series; Eurocup-4 Spanish Winter; F4 Spanish; F4 Brazilian

Championship titles
- 2025: F4 CEZ
- Statistics up to date as of 16 November 2026.

Genaro "Gino" Trappa (born 18 April 2008) is an Argentine racing driver who last competed in Eurocup-3 with Hitech.

Trappa is the 2025 Formula 4 CEZ champion.

== Career ==
=== Karting and Formula 4 debut (2022–2024) ===
Born in San Isidro, Buenos Aires, Trappa began karting in 2022. In his brief karting career, he won the 2023 LeVanto Trophy in the Rok Cup Superfinal and was the vice-champion in both the Rotax Winter Trophy USA and the IAME Series Argentina the same year.

After testing Formula 4 machinery with Bassani Racing in 2023, Trappa signed with them to make his single-seater debut in the 2024 F4 Brazilian Championship. Taking his first series podium by finishing third at Mogi Guaçu, Trappa followed that up with his only win of the season in the following round at Interlagos in race two, before finishing third in race three. In the remaining five rounds, Trappa took three more podiums with a best result of second at Goiânia, helping him secure fifth in points in his only season in the series. During 2024, Trappa also represented Argentina at the FIA Motorsport Games Formula 4 Cup and made a one-off appearance for Drivex in the F4 Spanish Championship.

=== Maiden single-seater title and Euroformula Open debut (2025) ===
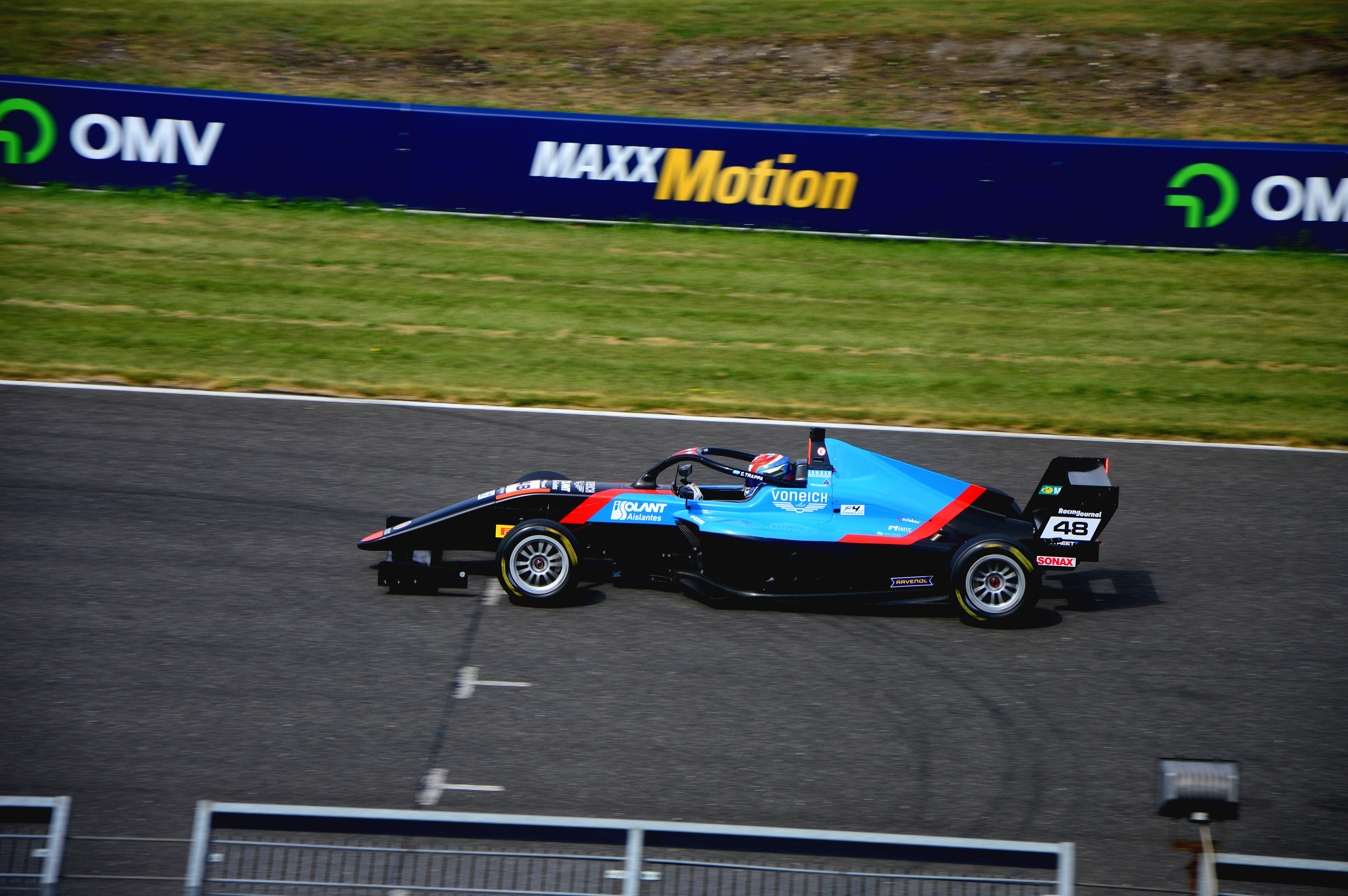
Trappa (pictured at the Slovakia Ring round) won the 2025 F4 CEZ Championship for Jenzer Motorsport.

The following year, Trappa returned to Drivex to race in both the Eurocup-4 Spanish Winter Championship and F4 Spanish Championships, whilst also joining Jenzer Motorsport to compete in the Formula 4 CEZ Championship. After just taking one points finish in the winter, an eighth at Algarve, Trappa began the main season by taking his maiden series points in race three at Aragón. Two rounds later at Algarve, Trappa scored two more points finished by taking tenth and ninth in the first two races. Two rounds later at Jerez, Trappa finished in the points in all three races, as well as taking his best result of the season in race two by finishing seventh, en route to a 16th-place points finish.

In the CEZ series, Trappa opened up the season by finishing second in all three races at the Red Bull Ring, before taking his first two wins of the season at the same venue a month later. Trappa won race three at Salzburgring while finishing second in the other two races, prior to scoring two consecutive wins in the following round at Most to extend his championship lead. Despite scoring a win in the following round at Slovakia Ring, Trappa's points lead was cut down to 54 points with one round left after finishing no higher than eighth in the other two races. Trappa then finished outside of the podium in all three races at Brno, but was able to clinch the title in the season-finale after finishing fifth in race three. During the winter, Trappa also raced for Van Amersfoort Racing in two rounds of the Formula Winter Series, taking a best result of tenth in race one at Valencia. Later that year, he also made a one-off appearance in the Euroformula Open Championship for Nielsen Racing. Racing at Le Castellet, Trappa scored a best result of fifth in race three. At the end of the year, Trappa raced in the FIA F4 World Cup, finishing ninth in the main race.

=== Formula Regional full-time debut (2026–) ===
At the beginning of 2026, Trappa raced in the Eurocup-3 Spanish Winter Championship for Hitech, scoring a best result of fourth in race two at Jarama to take 13th in points. For the rest of the year, Trappa remained with the team to race in the main Eurocup-3 season, in which he was 14th in overall points with a podium in the Imola sprint race. During 2026, Trappa also competed part-time in the Euroformula Open Championship with Drivex, taking podiums at the Spa and Le Castellet rounds.

Trappa will continue with Hitech for the 2027 Eurocup-3 season.

== Karting record ==
=== Karting career summary ===
Season	Series	Team	Position
2023	RMC Winter Trophy – Junior Max		5th
2023	Rok Superfinal – Junior Rok		NC
2023	Rotax US Trophy Final – Junior Max		17th
2024	RMC Winter Trophy – Senior Max		25th

== Racing record ==
=== Racing career summary ===
Year	Series	Team	Races	Wins	Poles	F/Laps	Podiums	Points	Position
2024	F4 Brazilian Championship	Oakberry Bassani F4	23	1	1	5	6	182	5th
2024	F4 Spanish Championship	DXR by Drivex	3	0	0	0	0	0	42nd
2024	FIA Motorsport Games Formula 4 Cup	Team Argentina	1	0	0	0	0	—N/a	DSQ
2025	Eurocup-4 Spanish Winter Championship	Drivex	9	0	0	0	0	4	18th
2025	F4 Spanish Championship	Drivex	18	0	0	0	0	11	16th
2025	Formula Winter Series	Van Amersfoort Racing	6	0	0	0	0	1	22nd
2025	Formula 4 CEZ Championship	Jenzer Motorsport	18	6	3	5	11	294	**1st**
2025	Euroformula Open Championship	Nielsen Racing	3	0	0	0	0	18	17th
2025	FIA F4 World Cup		1	0	0	0	0	—N/a	9th
2026	Eurocup-3 Spanish Winter Championship	Hitech	9	0	0	0	0	13	15th
2026	Eurocup-3	Hitech	19	0	0	0	1	36	14th
2026	Euroformula Open Championship	Drivex	6	0	0	1	2	56	11th
2027	Eurocup-3	Hitech	0	0	0	0	0	0	TBD

=== Complete F4 Brazilian Championship results ===
(key) (Races in bold indicate pole position) (Races in italics indicate fastest lap)

Year	Team	1	2	3	4	5	6	7	8	9	10	11	12	13	14	15	16	17	18	19	20	21	22	23	24	25	DC	Points
2024	Oakberry Bassani F4	MGG1; 1; 11	MGG1; 2; 9	MGG1; 3; 3	INT1; 1; 7	INT1; 2; 1	INT1; 3; 3	MGG2; 1; 4	MGG2; 2; 5	MGG2; 3; 7	GOI1; 1; 5	GOI1; 2; 4	GOI1; 3; 9	BUA; 1 Ret	BUA; 2; 5	BUA; 3; 11	INT2; 1; 3	INT2; 2 C	INT2; 3 Ret	GOI2; 1; 2	GOI2; 2; 4	GOI2; 3; 8	INT3; 1 Ret	INT3; 2; 6	INT3; 3; 3	INT3; 4; 4	5th	182

=== Complete F4 Spanish Championship results ===
(key) (Races in bold indicate pole position; races in italics indicate fastest lap)

Year	Team	1	2	3	4	5	6	7	8	9	10	11	12	13	14	15	16	17	18	19	20	21	DC	Points
2024	DXR by Drivex	JAR; 1	JAR; 2	JAR; 3	POR; 1	POR; 2	POR; 3	LEC; 1	LEC; 2	LEC; 3	ARA; 1	ARA; 2	ARA; 3	CRT; 1; 21	CRT; 2; 25	CRT; 3; 24	JER; 1	JER; 2	JER; 3	CAT; 1	CAT; 2	CAT; 3	42nd	0
2025	Drivex	ARA; 1; 19	ARA; 2; 20	ARA; 3; 10	NAV; 1 Ret	NAV; 2; 12	NAV; 3; 14	POR; 1; 10	POR; 2; 9	POR; 3; 28	LEC; 1; 18	LEC; 2 Ret	LEC; 3; 28	JER; 1; 9	JER; 2; 7	JER; 3; 9	CRT; 1; 17	CRT; 2; 11	CRT; 3; 20	CAT; 1	CAT; 2	CAT; 3	16th	11

=== Complete Eurocup-4 Spanish Winter Championship results ===
(key) (Races in bold indicate pole position) (Races in italics indicate fastest lap)

Year	Team	1	2	3	4	5	6	7	8	9	DC	Points
2025	Drivex	JER; 1; 31†	JER; 2; 15	JER; 3; 14	POR; 1; 8	POR; 2; 30†	POR; 3; 12	NAV; 1; 17	NAV; 2; 25	NAV; 3 Ret	18th	4

=== Complete Formula Winter Series results ===
(key) (Races in bold indicate pole position) (Races in italics indicate fastest lap)

Year	Team	1	2	3	4	5	6	7	8	9	10	11	12	DC	Points
2025	Van Amersfoort Racing	POR; 1	POR; 2	POR; 3	CRT; 1; 10	CRT; 2; 13	CRT; 3; 22	ARA; 1; 13	ARA; 2; 14	ARA; 3; 25	CAT; 1	CAT; 2	CAT; 3	22nd	1

=== Complete Formula 4 CEZ Championship results ===
(key) (Races in bold indicate pole position) (Races in italics indicate fastest lap)

Year	Team	1	2	3	4	5	6	7	8	9	10	11	12	13	14	15	16	17	18	DC	Points
2025	Jenzer Motorsport	RBR1; 1; 2	RBR1; 2; 2	RBR1; 3; 2	**RBR2**; **1**; 1	RBR2; 2; 4	RBR2; 3; 1	**SAL**; **1**; 2	SAL; 2; 2	SAL; 3; 1	**MOS**; **1**; 1	MOS; 2; 1	MOS; 3; 5	SVK; 1; 1	SVK; 2; 8	SVK; 3; 1	BRN; 1; 6	BRN; 2; 5	BRN; 3; 5	1st	294

=== Complete Euroformula Open Championship results ===
(key) (Races in bold indicate pole position) (Races in italics indicate fastest lap)

Year	Entrant	1	2	3	4	5	6	7	8	9	10	11	12	13	14	15	16	17	18	19	20	21	22	23	24	DC	Points
2025	Nielsen Racing	PRT; 1	PRT; 2	PRT; 3	SPA; 1	SPA; 2	SPA; 3	HOC; 1	HOC; 2	HOC; 3	HUN; 1	HUN; 2	HUN; 3	LEC; 1; 9	LEC; 2; 7	LEC; 3; 5	RBR; 1	RBR; 2	RBR; 3	CAT; 1	CAT; 2	CAT; 3	MNZ; 1	MNZ; 2	MNZ; 3	17th	18
2026	Drivex	PRT; 1	PRT; 2	PRT; 3	SPA; 1; 5	SPA; 2; 12†	SPA; 3; 3	MIS; 1	MIS; 2	MIS; 3	HUN; 1	HUN; 2	HUN; 3	LEC; 1; 7	LEC; 2; 7	LEC; 3; 2	HOC; 1	HOC; 2	HOC; 3	MNZ; 1	MNZ; 2	MNZ; 3	CAT; 1	CAT; 2	CAT; 3	11th	56

=== Complete FIA F4 World Cup results ===
Year	Car	Qualifying	Quali Race	Main Race
2025	Mygale M21-F4	11th	DNF	9th

=== Complete Eurocup-3 Spanish Winter Championship results ===
(key) (Races in bold indicate pole position) (Races in italics indicate fastest lap)

Year	Team	1	2	3	4	5	6	7	8	9	DC	Points
2026	Hitech	POR; 1 Ret	POR; SR; 25†	POR; 2 Ret	JAR; 1; 11	JAR; SR; 22	JAR; 2; 4	ARA; 1; 19	ARA; SR; 12	ARA; 2; 8	13th	16

=== Complete Eurocup-3 results ===
(key) (Races in bold indicate pole position; races in italics indicate fastest lap)

Year	Team	1	2	3	4	5	6	7	8	9	10	11	12	13	14	15	16	17	18	19	DC	Points
2026	Hitech	LEC; 1 Ret	LEC; SR; 27†	LEC; 2; 6	POR; 1; 8	POR; 2; 11	IMO; 1 Ret	IMO; SR; 2	IMO; 2; 12	MNZ; 1; 27	MNZ; 2; 6	SIL; 1; 10	SIL; 2; 15	JER; 1 Ret	JER; SR; 27†	JER; 2; 16	HUN; 1; 19	HUN; 2; 14	CAT; 1; 7	CAT; 2; 12	14th	36
