= 2023 F4 Brazilian Championship =

Motor racing series

The 2023 F4 Brazilian Championship was the second season of the F4 Brazilian Championship. It was a multi-event motor racing championship for open wheel, formula racing cars regulated according to FIA Formula 4 regulations. The championship used Tatuus F4-T421 chassis.

== Teams and drivers ==
All pre-selected teams were Brazilian-registered. Unlike the previous year, there was no draw allocating the drivers to the teams.

Full Time Sports' Formula 4 operation were moved under its subsidiary Bassani Racing. KTF Sports was not replaced.

Team	No.	Driver	Class	Rounds
Cavaleiro Sports	9	(Brazil) Lucca Zucchini		All
Cavaleiro Sports	16	(Brazil) Mateus Callejas	R	1–2
Cavaleiro Sports	30	(Brazil) Vinícius Tessaro		All
Cavaleiro Sports	33	(Brazil) Nelson Neto		4–6
Cavaleiro Sports	41	(Brazil) Fernando Barrichello		2–6
Cavaleiro Sports	98	(Brazil) Cecília Rabelo	R	1, 3–6
Oakberry Bassani F4	11	(Thailand) Carl Bennett		2–3
Oakberry Bassani F4	26	(Brazil) Alexandre Machado	R	All
Oakberry Bassani F4	27	(Brazil) Matheus Ferreira		5
Oakberry Bassani F4	33	(Brazil) Nelson Neto		1–3
Oakberry Bassani F4	88	(Brazil) Arthur Pavie	R	All
Oakberry Bassani F4	118	(Brazil) Matheus Comparatto	R	All
TMG Racing	16	(Brazil) Mateus Callejas	R	3–4
TMG Racing	18	(Brazil) Rafaela Ferreira	R	All
TMG Racing	21	(Brazil) Álvaro Cho		All
TMG Racing	29	(Brazil) João Tesser		All
TMG Racing	99	(Brazil) Luan Lopes		All

Icon	Class
R	Rookie

- Ayrton Chorne was set to participate in the round supporting the São Paulo Grand Prix but did not compete.

== Race calendar ==
The schedule was revealed on 1 February 2023. All rounds were held in Brazil and all but one supported the 2023 Stock Car Pro Series events. One round supported the 2023 São Paulo Grand Prix. In April 2023, the round at Autódromo Internacional Nelson Piquet in Brasília on 16–18 June was replaced by the round at Interlagos Circuit three weeks later. Likewise in September 2023, the round at Autódromo Internacional Nelson Piquet on 24–26 November was replaced by the round at Interlagos Circuit three weeks later.

Round		Circuit	Date	Pole position	Fastest lap	Winning driver	Winning team	Rookie winner
1	R1	Interlagos Circuit, São Paulo	22 April	(Brazil) Vinícius Tessaro	(Brazil) Luan Lopes	(Brazil) Vinícius Tessaro	Cavaleiro Sports	(Brazil) Matheus Comparatto
1	R2	Interlagos Circuit, São Paulo	22 April		(Brazil) Vinícius Tessaro	(Brazil) Nelson Neto	Oakberry Bassani F4	(Brazil) Mateus Callejas
1	R3	Interlagos Circuit, São Paulo	23 April	(Brazil) Álvaro Cho	(Brazil) Vinícius Tessaro	(Brazil) Vinícius Tessaro	Cavaleiro Sports	(Brazil) Matheus Comparatto
2	R1	Interlagos Circuit, São Paulo	8 July	(Brazil) Vinícius Tessaro	(Brazil) Matheus Comparatto	(Brazil) Luan Lopes	TMG Racing	(Brazil) Matheus Comparatto
2	R2	Interlagos Circuit, São Paulo	8 July		(Thailand) Carl Bennett	(Brazil) Mateus Callejas	Cavaleiro Sports	(Brazil) Mateus Callejas
2	R3	Interlagos Circuit, São Paulo	9 July	(Brazil) Vinícius Tessaro	(Brazil) Vinícius Tessaro	(Brazil) Vinícius Tessaro	Cavaleiro Sports	(Brazil) Matheus Comparatto
3	R1	Autódromo Velo Città, Mogi Guaçu	5 August	(Brazil) Matheus Comparatto	(Brazil) Vinícius Tessaro	(Brazil) Matheus Comparatto	Oakberry Bassani F4	(Brazil) Matheus Comparatto
3	R2	Autódromo Velo Città, Mogi Guaçu	5 August		(Brazil) Vinícius Tessaro	(Brazil) Vinícius Tessaro	Cavaleiro Sports	(Brazil) Mateus Callejas
3	R3	Autódromo Velo Città, Mogi Guaçu	6 August	(Brazil) Matheus Comparatto	(Brazil) Matheus Comparatto	(Brazil) Matheus Comparatto	Oakberry Bassani F4	(Brazil) Matheus Comparatto
4	R1	Autódromo Internacional Ayrton Senna, Goiânia	26 August	(Brazil) Álvaro Cho (Note: Tessaro set the best second fastest lap but received a ten place grid penalty for exceeding the penalty points limit. Cho inherited the pole position.)	(Brazil) Vinícius Tessaro	(Brazil) Álvaro Cho	TMG Racing	(Brazil) Matheus Comparatto
4	R2	Autódromo Internacional Ayrton Senna, Goiânia	26 August		(Brazil) Matheus Comparatto	(Brazil) Matheus Comparatto	Oakberry Bassani F4	(Brazil) Matheus Comparatto
4	R3	Autódromo Internacional Ayrton Senna, Goiânia	27 August	(Brazil) Lucca Zucchini	(Brazil) Vinícius Tessaro	(Brazil) Vinícius Tessaro	Cavaleiro Sports	(Brazil) Matheus Comparatto
5	R1	Interlagos Circuit, São Paulo	4 November	(Brazil) Cecília Rabelo	(Brazil) Vinícius Tessaro	(Brazil) Matheus Ferreira	Oakberry Bassani F4	(Brazil) Alexandre Machado
5	R2	Interlagos Circuit, São Paulo	4 November		(Brazil) Alexandre Machado	(Brazil) Alexandre Machado	Oakberry Bassani F4	(Brazil) Alexandre Machado
5	R3	Interlagos Circuit, São Paulo	5 November	(Brazil) Cecília Rabelo	(Brazil) Matheus Ferreira	(Brazil) Matheus Ferreira	Oakberry Bassani F4	(Brazil) Matheus Comparatto
6	R1	Interlagos Circuit, São Paulo	16 December	(Brazil) Luan Lopes	(Brazil) Vinícius Tessaro	(Brazil) Vinícius Tessaro	Cavaleiro Sports	(Brazil) Matheus Comparatto
6	R2	Interlagos Circuit, São Paulo	16 December		(Brazil) Álvaro Cho	(Brazil) Lucca Zucchini	Cavaleiro Sports	(Brazil) Rafaela Ferreira
6	R3	Interlagos Circuit, São Paulo	17 December	(Brazil) Matheus Comparatto	(Brazil) Fernando Barrichello	(Brazil) Matheus Comparatto	Oakberry Bassani F4	(Brazil) Matheus Comparatto

== Championship standings ==
Points were awarded to the top ten classified finishers in 25-minute races and for the top eight classified finishers in 18-minute races. The final individual classifications were obtained by dropping two worst results from the first five rounds of the championship.

Races	Position, points per race										
Races	**1st**	**2nd**	**3rd**	**4th**	**5th**	**6th**	**7th**	**8th**	**9th**	**10th**	**FL**
Qualifying	2										
25-minute races	25	18	15	12	10	8	6	4	2	1	1
18-minute races	15	12	10	8	6	4	2	1			1

=== Drivers' standings ===
Pos	Driver	INT1			INT2			MOG			GYN			INT3			INT4			Pts
1	(Brazil) Vinícius Tessaro	**1**	9	1	**3**	7	**1**	7	1	6	5	3	1	2	6	11	1	Ret	5	233
2	(Brazil) Matheus Comparatto	4	5	4	2	5	5	**1**	7	**1**	8	1	4	Ret	4	3	6	4	**1**	216
3	(Brazil) Álvaro Cho	3	2	**2**	9	6	4	4	8	2	**1**	6	2	3	7	5	4	2	4	204
4	(Brazil) Luan Lopes	2	Ret	3	1	11	2	2	6	3	4	5	Ret	Ret	8	4	**2**	7	3	180
5	(Brazil) Fernando Barrichello				13†	8	13	6	2	4	6	4	3	4	2	2	3	9	2	140
6	(Brazil) Nelson Neto	5	1	8	12	12	9	5	4	9	2	8	5	6	3	9	5	Ret	6	118
7	(Brazil) Lucca Zucchini	9	7	6	5	3	8	3	9	5	3	9	**Ret**	Ret	11	6	8	1	9	107
8	(Brazil) João Tesser	12†	4	5	4	4	12	12	12	7	7	2	Ret	8	9	10	Ret	5	7	79
9	(Brazil) Mateus Callejas	7	3	10	7	1	6	8	3	10	Ret	WD	WD							61
10	(Brazil) Arthur Pavie	6	8	7	6	2	7	10	11	Ret	9	7	9	10	10	8	11†	6	10	58
11	(Brazil) Matheus Ferreira													1	5	1				57
12	(Brazil) Alexandre Machado	8	DSQ	12†	11	13	10	11	5	12	11	Ret	8	5	1	Ret	9	8	8	48
13	(Brazil) Rafaela Ferreira	11	6	9	10	10	11	Ret	13	11	10	10	6	9	12	7	7	3	Ret	40
14	(Thailand) Carl Bennett				8	9	3	9	10	8										26
15	(Brazil) Cecília Rabelo	10	10	11				WD	WD	WD	12	11	7	**7**	13	**Ret**	10	DSQ	11	16

Colour	Result
Gold	Winner
Silver	Second place
Bronze	Third place
Green	Points classification
Blue	Non-points classification
Blue	Non-classified finish (NC)
Purple	Retired, not classified (Ret)
Red	Did not qualify (DNQ)
Red	Did not pre-qualify (DNPQ)
Black	Disqualified (DSQ)
White	Did not start (DNS)
White	Withdrew (WD)
White	Race cancelled (C)
Blank	Did not practice (DNP)
Blank	Did not arrive (DNA)
Blank	Excluded (EX)

**Bold** – Pole
Italics – Fastest Lap
† — Did not finish but classified

=== Rookies' championship ===
Pos	Driver	INT1			INT2			MOG			GYN			INT3			INT4			Pts
1	(Brazil) Matheus Comparatto	1	2	**1**	1	3	**1**	1	3	**1**	1	1	**1**	Ret	2	1	1	2	**1**	355
2	(Brazil) Arthur Pavie	2	4	2	2	2	3	3	4	Ret	2	2	5	4	3	3	Ret	3	3	220
3	(Brazil) Rafaela Ferreira	6	3	3	4	4	5	Ret	5	3	3	3	2	3	4	2	2	1	Ret	195
4	(Brazil) Alexandre Machado	4	DSQ	6†	5	5	4	4	2	4	4	Ret	4	1	1	Ret	3	4	2	191
5	(Brazil) Mateus Callejas	3	1	4	3	1	2	2	1	2	Ret	WD	WD							143
6	(Brazil) Cecília Rabelo	5	5	5				WD	WD	WD	5	4	3	2	5	**Ret**	4	DSQ	4	109

=== Teams' championship ===
Each team acquired the points earned by their two best drivers in each race.

Pos	Team	INT1			INT2			MOG			GYN			INT3			INT4			Pts
1	Cavaleiro Sports	**1**	3	1	**3**	1	**1**	3	1	4	2	3	1	2	2	2	1	1	2	492
1	Cavaleiro Sports	7	7	6	5	3	6	6	2	5	3	4	3	4	3	6	3	9	5	492
2	TMG Racing	2	2	**2**	1	4	2	2	3	2	**1**	2	2	3	7	4	**2**	2	3	450
2	TMG Racing	3	4	3	4	6	4	4	6	3	4	5	6	8	8	5	4	3	4	450
3	Oakberry Bassani F4	4	1	4	2	2	3	**1**	4	**1**	8	1	4	1	1	1	6	4	**1**	405
3	Oakberry Bassani F4	5	5	7	6	5	5	5	5	8	9	7	8	5	4	3	9	6	8	405
