= Pedro Clerot =

Brazilian racing driver (born 2007)

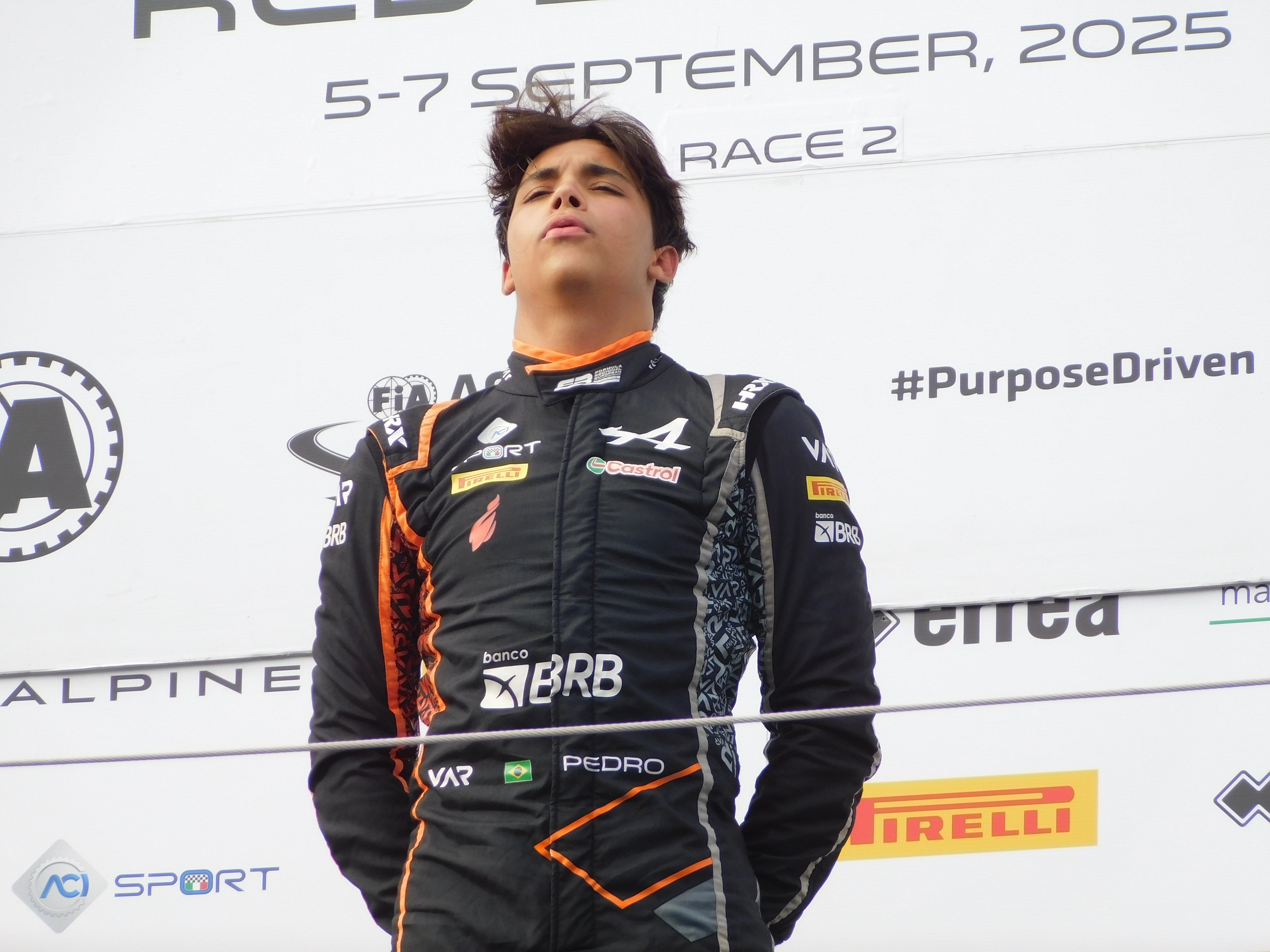
- Clerot in 2025
- Nationality: (Brazil) Brazilian
- Born: Pedro Henrique Rodovalho Clerot; 22 January 2007 (age 19) Brasília, Brazil

FIA Formula 3 Championship career
- Debut season: 2026
- Current team: Rodin Motorsport
- Car number: 17
- Starts: 19
- Wins: 1
- Podiums: 5
- Poles: 0
- Fastest laps: 0
- Best finish: 6th in 2026

Previous series
- 2024–2025; 2024; 2023; 2023; 2022; 2016–21: FR European; FR Middle East; F4 Spanish; F4 UAE; F4 Brazilian; Karting

Championship titles
- 2022: F4 Brazilian
- Statistics up to date as of 15 September 2026.

Pedro Henrique Rodovalho Clerot (born 22 January 2007) is a Brazilian racing driver who last competed in the FIA Formula 3 Championship for Rodin Motorsport.

Clerot previously raced in the Formula Regional European Championship for Van Amersfoort Racing, finishing fourth in 2025. He is the 2022 F4 Brazilian champion.

== Career ==
=== Karting ===
Clerot started his racing career in karting in 2016. In a short time, he was proclaimed three-time champion of Brasilia, in the 2018, 2019 and 2021 seasons and won the Brazil Open Cup twice in 2020 and 2021.

=== Formula 4 ===
==== 2022 ====
In 2022, Full Time Sports announced that Clerot would compete in the inaugural season of the F4 Brazilian Championship in 2022, where in 18 races, he won seven races, and scored four pole positions, seven fastest laps, eleven podiums and add 276 points. As a result, he became the first driver's champion of the new F4 championship. Clerot also participated in the FIA Motorsport Games in the Formula 4 category with Team Brazil, managing to qualify twice in fourth place. However, he finished in ninth position in the main race due to a five-second penalty for having exceeded the limits of the track on six different occasions.

==== 2023 ====
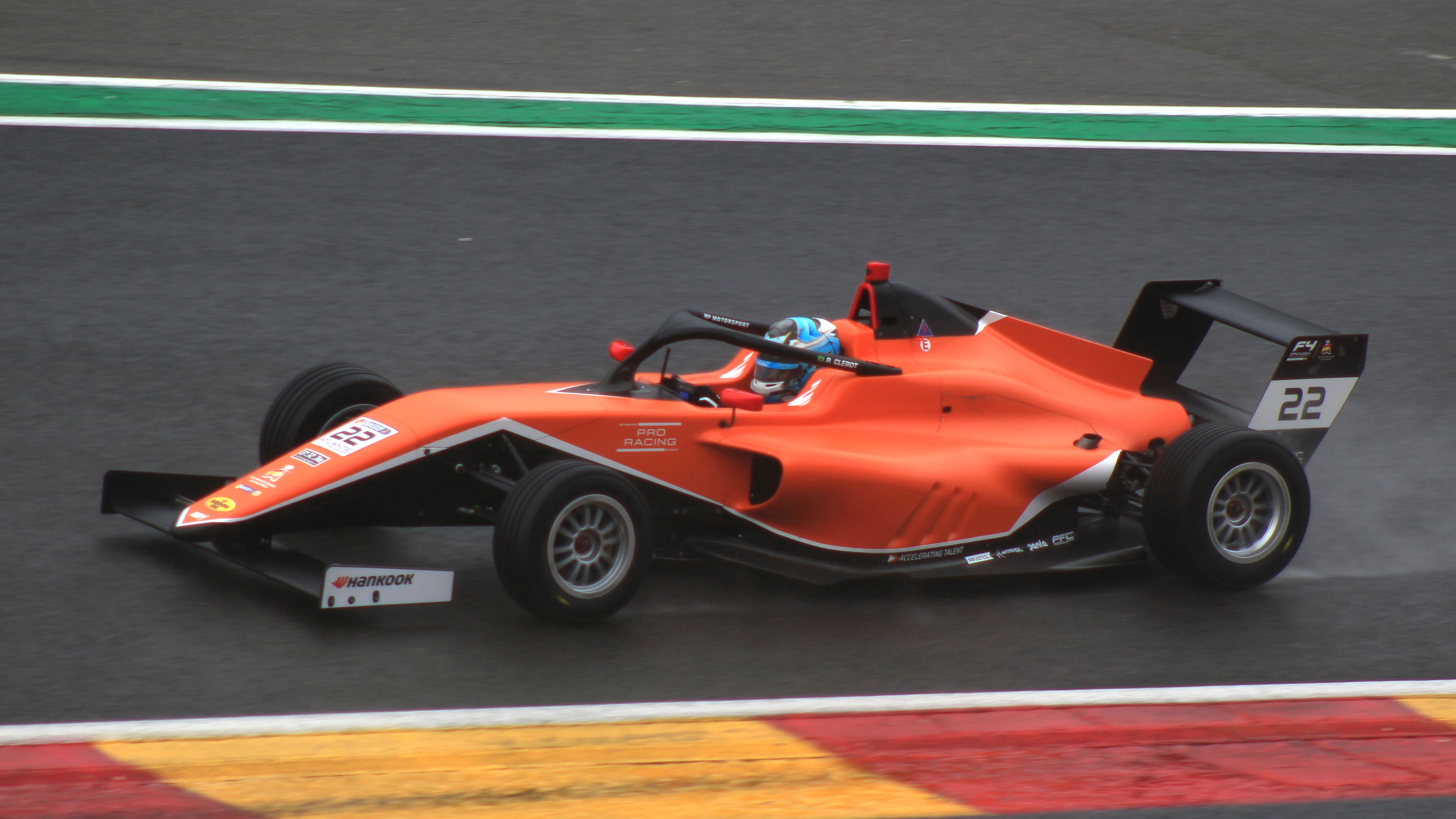
Clerot racing at Spa-Francorchamps during the 2023 F4 Spanish Championship

On 6 December 2022, it was announced that Clerot signed with MP Motorsport for the 2023 F4 Spanish Championship. He competed with that team in the 2023 Formula 4 UAE Championship. Clerot had a dream start to his Spanish F4 campaign, taking a double win during the opening round in Spa-Francorchamps. He followed with a second place in Race 3 to comfortably lead the standings. However, this proved to be a false dawn as he failed to win or even make the podium throughout the rest of the year. By the end of the season, Clerot dropped to sixth in the standings, with 151 points.

=== Formula Regional ===
==== 2024 ====
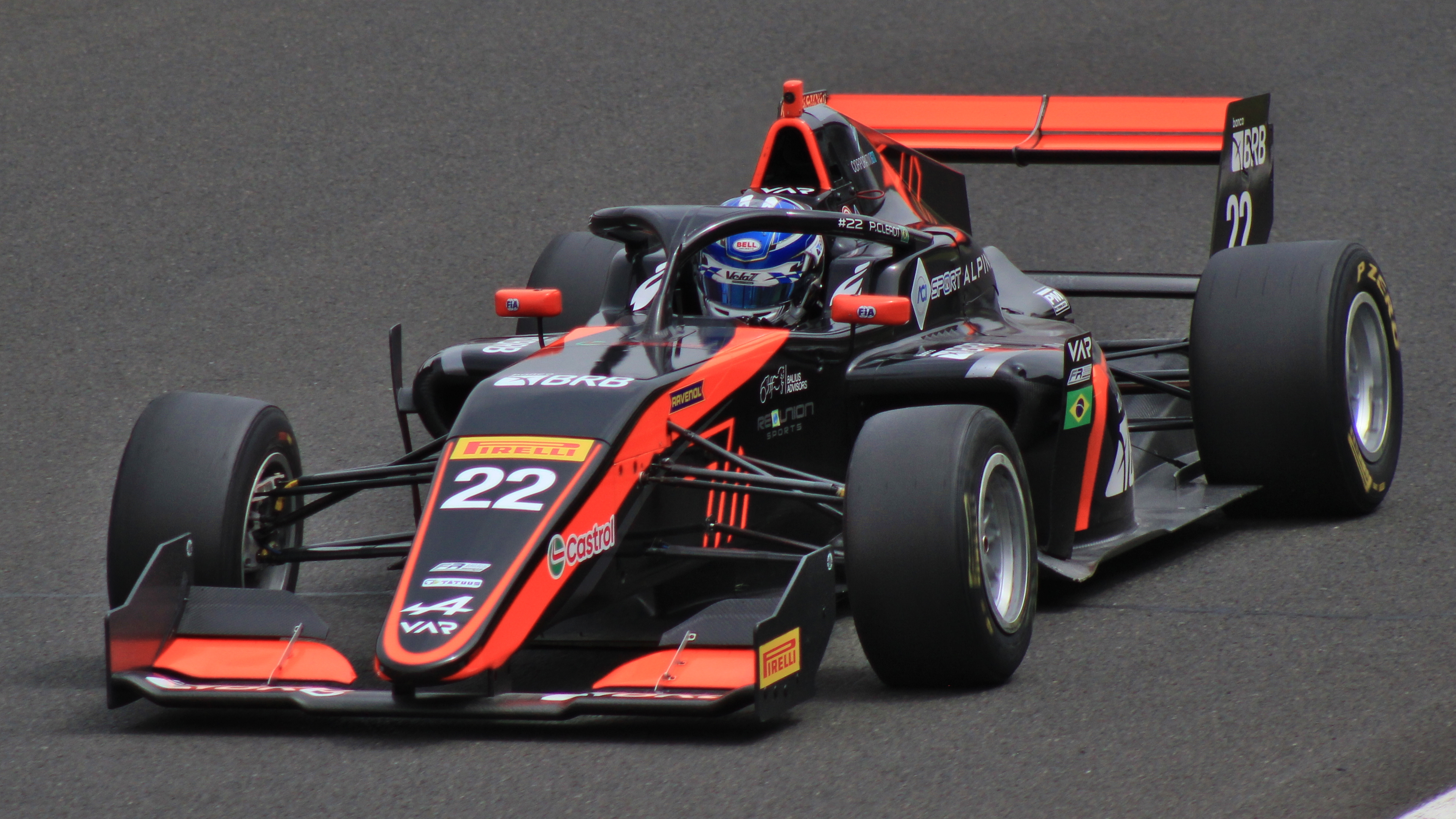
Clerot driving at the Hungaroring during the 2024 Formula Regional European Championship

Clerot participated in the first two rounds of the Formula Regional Middle East Championship with Saintéloc Racing. Taking a best finish of 14th, he was ranked 28th in the standings.

For 2024, Clerot stepped to the Formula Regional European Championship with Van Amersfoort Racing.

==== 2025 ====
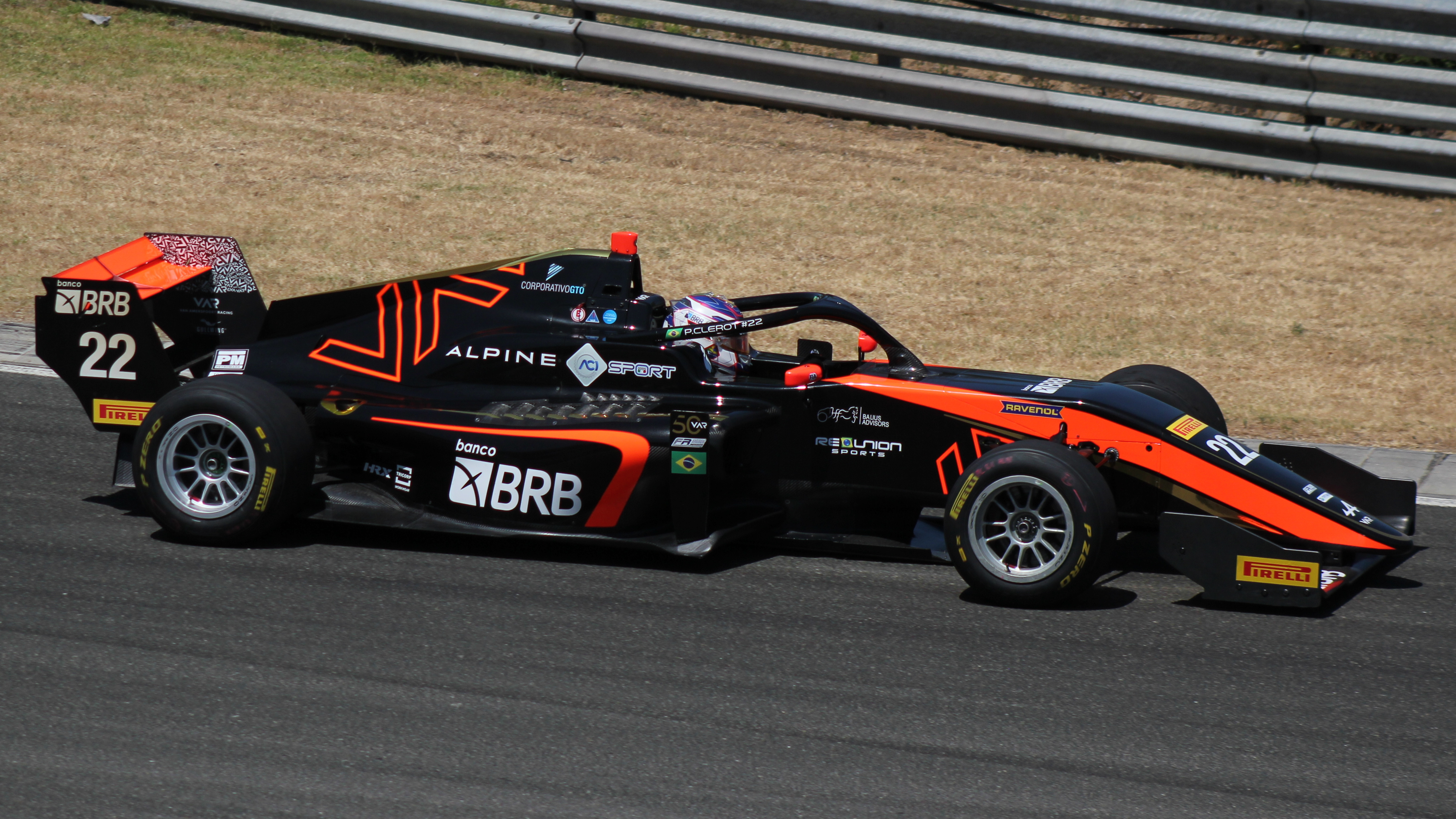
Clerot driving at the Hungaroring during the 2025 Formula Regional European Championship

In 2025, Clerot remained with Van Amersfoort Racing for a second season in the Formula Regional European Championship.

=== FIA Formula 3 ===
==== 2026 ====
Clerot was promoted to Formula 3 for 2026, joining Rodin Motorsport alongside Brando Badoer and Christian Ho.

==== 2027 ====
Clerot continued in Formula 3 in 2027 for a second season with Rodin Motorsport.

== Racing record ==
=== Racing career summary ===
Season	Series	Team	Races	Wins	Poles	F/Laps	Podiums	Points	Position
2021	Formula Delta	N/A	14	2	2	4	9	121	**2nd**
2022	F4 Brazilian Championship	Full Time Sports	18	7	4	7	11	276	**1st**
2022	Italian F4 Championship	AKM Motorsport	6	0	0	0	0	0	31st
2022	FIA Motorsport Games Formula 4 Cup	Team Brazil	1	0	0	0	0	N/A	9th
2023	Formula 4 UAE Championship	MP Motorsport	6	0	0	0	0	30	13th
2023	F4 Spanish Championship	MP Motorsport	21	2	1	1	3	151	6th
2024	Formula Regional Middle East Championship	Saintéloc Racing	6	0	0	0	0	0	28th
2024	Formula Regional European Championship	Van Amersfoort Racing	20	0	0	0	2	93	8th
2025	Formula Regional European Championship	Van Amersfoort Racing	20	2	3	1	7	233	4th
2026	FIA Formula 3 Championship	Rodin Motorsport	19	1	0	0	5	88	6th
2027	FIA Formula 3 Championship	Rodin Motorsport	0	0	0	0	0	0	TBD
2027	Formula Regional Oceania Trophy	Rodin Motorsport							

* Season still in progress.

=== Complete F4 Brazilian Championship results ===
(key) (Races in bold indicate pole position) (Races in italics indicate fastest lap)

Year	Team	1	2	3	4	5	6	7	8	9	10	11	12	13	14	15	16	17	18	DC	Points
2022	Full Time Sports	**MOG1**; **1**; 1	MOG1; 2; 4	MOG1; 3; 1	**INT1**; **1**; 1	INT1; 2; 2	**INT1**; **3**; 1^{Q}	**INT2**; **1**; 1	INT2; 2; 4	INT2; 3; 2	MOG2; 1; 1	MOG2; 2; 8	MOG2; 3; 2	GYN; 1; 2	GYN; 2; 9	GYN; 3; 1	INT3; 1 Ret	INT3; 2; 11	INT3; 3; 5	1st	276

=== Complete FIA Motorsport Games results ===
Year	Team	Cup	Qualifying	Quali Race	Main Race
2022	Team Brazil	**Formula 4**	4th	4th	9th

=== Complete Formula 4 UAE Championship results ===
(key) (Races in bold indicate pole position) (Races in italics indicate fastest lap)

Year	Team	1	2	3	4	5	6	7	8	9	10	11	12	13	14	15	Pos	Points
2023	MP Motorsport	DUB1; 1	DUB1; 2	DUB1; 3	KMT1; 1	KMT1; 2	KMT1; 3	KMT2; 1	KMT2; 2	KMT2; 3	DUB2; 1; 12	DUB2; 2; 5	DUB2; 3; 12	YMC; 1; 9	YMC; 2; 7	YMC; 3; 4	13th	30

=== Complete F4 Spanish Championship results ===
(key) (Races in bold indicate pole position) (Races in italics indicate fastest lap)

Year	Team	1	2	3	4	5	6	7	8	9	10	11	12	13	14	15	16	17	18	19	20	21	DC	Points
2023	MP Motorsport	**SPA**; **1**; 1	SPA; 2; 1	SPA; 3; 2	ARA; 1; 10	ARA; 2; 4	ARA; 3; 6	NAV; 1; 5	NAV; 2; 6	NAV; 3; 5	JER; 1; 12	JER; 2; 28	JER; 3; 10	EST; 1; 4	EST; 2; 5	EST; 3; 5	CRT; 1; 22	CRT; 2; 9	CRT; 3; 24	CAT; 1; 13	CAT; 2; 4	CAT; 3; 17	6th	151

=== Complete Formula Regional Middle East Championship results ===
(key) (Races in bold indicate pole position) (Races in italics indicate fastest lap)

Year	Entrant	1	2	3	4	5	6	7	8	9	10	11	12	13	14	15	DC	Points
2024	Saintéloc Racing	YMC1; 1; 18	YMC1; 2; 17	YMC1; 3 Ret	YMC2; 1; 21	YMC2; 2; 14	YMC2; 3 Ret	DUB1; 1	DUB1; 2	DUB1; 3	YMC3; 1	YMC3; 2	YMC3; 3	DUB2; 1	DUB2; 2	DUB2; 3	28th	0

=== Complete Formula Regional European Championship results ===
(key) (Races in bold indicate pole position) (Races in italics indicate fastest lap)

Year	Team	1	2	3	4	5	6	7	8	9	10	11	12	13	14	15	16	17	18	19	20	DC	Points
2024	Van Amersfoort Racing	HOC; 1; 13	HOC; 2; 6	SPA; 1 Ret	SPA; 2; 24	ZAN; 1; 4	ZAN; 2; 5	HUN; 1; 15	HUN; 2; 8	MUG; 1; 4	MUG; 2; 3	LEC; 1 Ret	LEC; 2; 18	IMO; 1; 10	IMO; 2; 6	RBR; 1; 20	RBR; 2; 6	CAT; 1 Ret	CAT; 2; 3	MNZ; 1; 23†	MNZ; 2 Ret	8th	93
2025	Van Amersfoort Racing	MIS; 1; 4	MIS; 2; 5	SPA; 1; 25	SPA; 2; 16	**ZAN**; **1**; 2	**ZAN**; **2**; 1	HUN; 1; 2	HUN; 2; 10	LEC; 1; 5	LEC; 2; 4	IMO; 1; 4	IMO; 2; 5	RBR; 1; 4	**RBR**; **2**; 1	CAT; 1; 3	CAT; 2; 2	HOC; 1; 6	HOC; 2; 7	MNZ; 1; 3	MNZ; 2; 7	4th	235

=== Complete FIA Formula 3 Championship results ===
(key) (Races in bold indicate pole position) (Races in italics indicate fastest lap)

Year	Entrant	1	2	3	4	5	6	7	8	9	10	11	12	13	14	15	16	17	18	19	20	DC	Points
2026	Rodin Motorsport	MEL; SPR; 14	MEL; FEA; 8	MON; SPR; 3	MON; FEA; 8	CAT; SPR; 13	CAT; FEA; 16	RBR; SPR; 2	RBR; FEA; 4	SIL; SPR; 20	SIL; FEA; 9	SPA; SPR; 3	SPA; FEA; 12	HUN; SPR; 21	HUN; FEA; 15	MNZ; SPR; Ret	MNZ; FEA; 21	MAD; SPR; 11	MAD; FEA1; 1	MAD; FEA2; 3		6th	88
2027	Rodin Motorsport	BHR; SPR	BHR; FEA	JED; SPR	JED; FEA	MEL; SPR	MEL; FEA	MTL; SPR	MTL; FEA	MON; SPR	MON; FEA	SIL; SPR	SIL; FEA	RBR; SPR	RBR; FEA	MNZ; SPR	MNZ; FEA	MAD; SPR	MAD; FEA	IST; SPR	IST; FEA	TBD	TBD
