= Francisco Soldavini =

Argentine racing driver (born 2007)

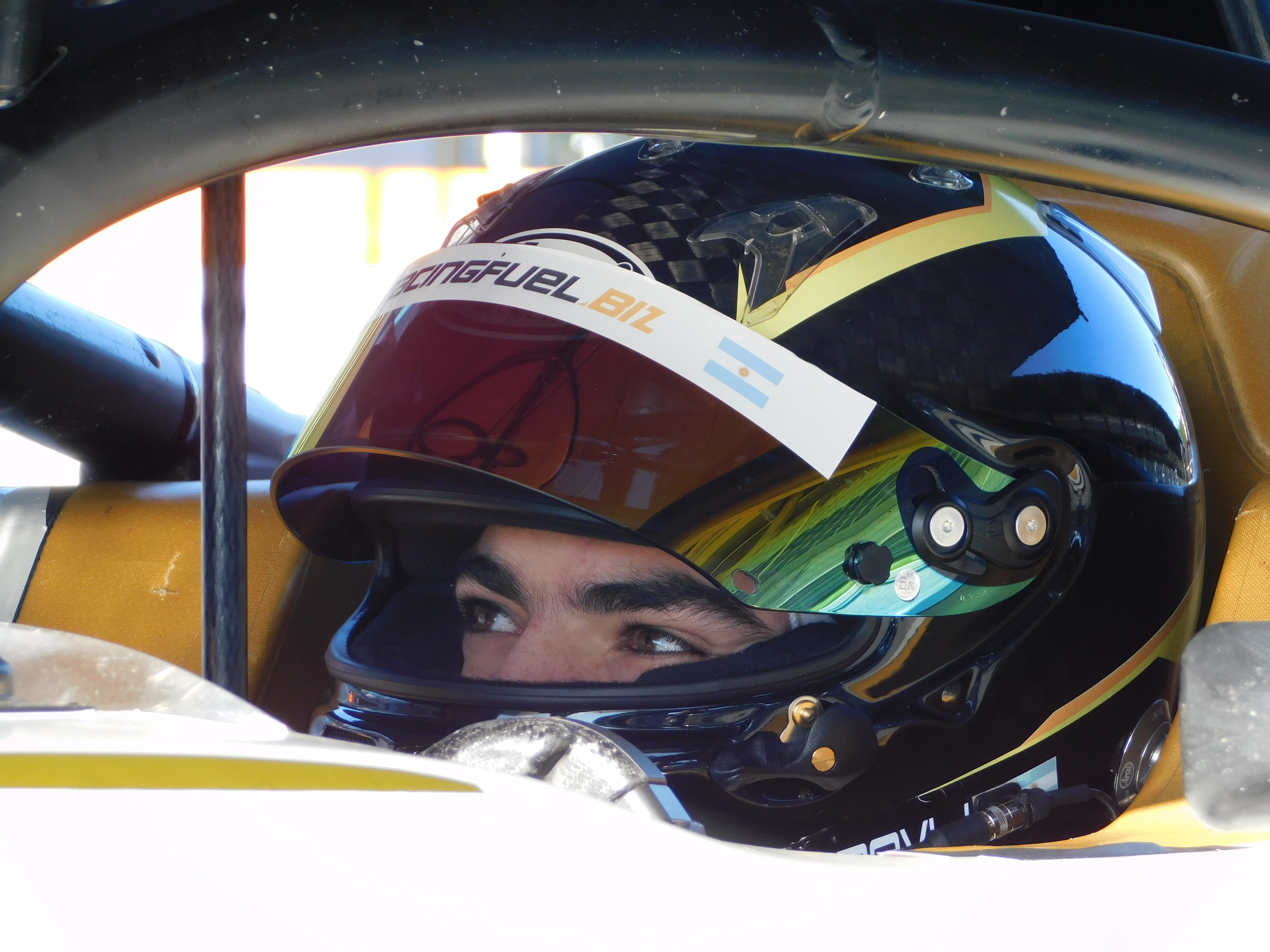
- Soldavini at the Red Bull Ring in 2025
- Born: Juan Francisco Soldavini Nores; 3 March 2007 (age 19); La Cumbre, Argentina
- Nationality: (Argentina) Argentine

Juan Francisco "Panchito" Soldavini Nores (born 3 March 2007) is an Argentine racing driver who last competed for Nielsen Racing in Euroformula Open.

== Career ==
Soldavini began karting at the age of seven. Initially competing in the America, Soldavini began competing in Europe in 2017 with Birel ART Racing, finishing 29th on his debut in the WSK Champions Cup. Soldavini remained in karting until 2021, most notably finishing third in the 2018 IAME International Finals in the X30 Mini class.

Stepping up to single-seaters in 2022, Soldavini made his F4 debut in the Italian F4 Championship with Maffi Racing. In the two rounds, Soldavini took a best result of 21st in race one at Monza. One month later, Soldavini competed in the final round of the F4 Spanish Championship with Cram-Pinnacle at Barcelona, scoring a best result of 25th in race one. Soldavini then ended the year with a one-off appearance for KTF Sports in the final round of the F4 Brazilian Championship, taking his maiden career points by finishing tenth in race one.

In 2023, Soldavini joined Team Virage to make a one-off appearance in the Ultimate Cup Series' Challenge Monoplace series at Estoril, winning on debut and finishing third in the other two races. Soldavini then joined G4 Racing to compete in the last two rounds of the Formula Regional European Championship. Racing at both the Zandvoort and Hockenheimring rounds, Soldavini scored a best result of 22nd in race two at Zandvoort.

Soldavini mainly raced in Ultimate Cup Series' Challenge Monoplace the following season, joining ART-Line Virage from the second round of the season onwards. Having taken his maiden win in cars in race three at Algarve, he then won the first two races of the following round at Hockenheimring, before retiring in race three. In the following round at Mugello, Soldavini won all three races, before taking a best result of third at in the following round at Magny-Cours, after taking pole earlier in the weekend. That turned out to be Soldavini's last podium of the season as he withdrew from the final round at Le Castellet, as he ended the year third in points.

Having sat much of 2025 on the sidelines, Soldavini returned to racing in September by joining Nielsen Racing to make his debut in Euroformula Open at the Red Bull Ring round, scoring a best result of ninth in race three.

== Karting record ==
=== Karting career summary ===
Season	Series	Team	Position
2015	SKUSA SuperNationals — TaG Cadet	CRG SoCal	71st
2016	SKUSA SuperNationals — Mini Swift	2Wild Karting	71st
2017	WSK Champions Cup — 60 Mini	Birel ART Racing	29th
2017	WSK Super Master Series — 60 Mini	Birel ART Racing	76th
2017	South Garda Winter Cup — Mini Rok	Birel ART Racing	NC
2017	Andrea Margutti Trophy — 60 Mini	Birel ART Racing	16th
2018	WSK Champions Cup — 60 Mini	AV Racing	23rd
2018	WSK Super Master Series — 60 Mini	AV Racing	29th
2018	South Garda Winter Cup — Mini Rok	AV Racing	NC
2018	Andrea Margutti Trophy — 60 Mini	AV Racing	32nd
2018	WSK Open Cup — 60 Mini	AV Racing	NC
2018	WSK Final Cup — OK-J	AV Racing	66th
2018	Italian Karting Championship — 60 Mini		23rd
2018	IAME International Final — X30 Mini		3rd
2019	WSK Champions Cup — 60 Mini	Novalux Racing Team	18th
2019	WSK Super Master Series — 60 Mini	Novalux Racing Team	46th
2019	WSK Euro Series — 60 Mini	Novalux Racing Team	47th
2019	Karting European Championship — OK-J	Novalux Racing Team	102nd
2019	Karting World Championship — OK-J	Novalux Racing Team	NC
2019	WSK Open Cup — OK-J	Novalux Racing Team	89th
2019	WSK Final Cup — OK-J	Novalux Racing Team	NC
2019	X30 Codasur Junior Argentina		16th
2020	WSK Super Master Series — OK-J	CRG	104th
2020	Karting European Championship — OK-J	CRG	37th
2020	WSK Euro Series — OK-J	CRG	60th
2020	Champions of the Future — OK-J	DPK Racing	NC
2020	Karting World Championship — OK-J	DPK Racing	NC
2021	WSK Champions Cup — OK-J	DPK Racing	NC
2021	WSK Super Master Series — OK-J	DPK Racing	72nd

== Racing record ==
=== Racing career summary ===
Season	Series	Team	Races	Wins	Poles	F/Laps	Podiums	Points	Position
2022	Italian F4 Championship	Maffi Racing	4	0	0	0	0	0	50th
2022	F4 Spanish Championship	Cram-Pinnacle	3	0	0	0	0	0	NC†
2022	F4 Brazilian Championship	KTF Sports	2	0	0	0	0	1	18th
2023	Ultimate Cup Series Challenge Monoplace – F3R	Team Virage	3	1	0	0	3	136	7th
2023	Formula Regional European Championship	G4 Racing	4	0	0	0	0	0†	NC†
2024	Ultimate Cup Series Challenge Monoplace – F3R (13 inch)	ART-Line Virage	12	6	7	4	7	230	**3rd**
2025	Euroformula Open Championship	Nielsen Racing	3	0	0	0	0	4	20th
2026	BOSS GP – Formula	MM International Motorsport	2	0	1	1	0	15*	9th*

^{†} As Soldavini was a guest driver, he was ineligible to score points.

=== Complete Italian F4 Championship results ===
(key) (Races in bold indicate pole position) (Races in italics indicate fastest lap)

Year	Team	1	2	3	4	5	6	7	8	9	10	11	12	13	14	15	16	17	18	19	20	21	22	DC	Points
2022	Maffi Racing	IMO; 1	IMO; 2	IMO; 3	MIS; 1	MIS; 2	MIS; 3	SPA; 1	SPA; 2	SPA; 3	VLL; 1	VLL; 2	VLL; 3	RBR; 1	RBR; 2; 23	RBR; 3; 24	RBR; 4 DNQ	MNZ; 1; 21	MNZ; 2; 27	MNZ; 3 C	MUG; 1	MUG; 2	MUG; 3	50th	0

=== Complete F4 Spanish Championship results ===
(key) (Races in bold indicate pole position) (Races in italics indicate fastest lap)

Year	Team	1	2	3	4	5	6	7	8	9	10	11	12	13	14	15	16	17	18	19	20	21	DC	Points
2022	Cram-Pinnacle	ALG; 1	ALG; 2	ALG; 3	JER; 1	JER; 2	JER; 3	CRT; 1	CRT; 2	CRT; 3	SPA; 1	SPA; 2	SPA; 3	ARA; 1	ARA; 2	ARA; 3	NAV; 1	NAV; 2	NAV; 3	CAT; 1; 25	CAT; 2; 28	CAT; 3 Ret	NC†	0

^{†} As Soldavini was a guest driver, he was ineligible to score points.

=== Complete F4 Brazilian Championship results ===
(key) (Races in bold indicate pole position) (Races in italics indicate fastest lap)

Year	Team	1	2	3	4	5	6	7	8	9	10	11	12	13	14	15	16	17	18	DC	Points
2022	KTF Sports	MOG1; 1	MOG1; 2	MOG1; 3	INT1; 1	INT1; 2	INT1; 3	INT2; 1	INT2; 2	INT2; 3	MOG2; 1	MOG2; 2	MOG2; 3	GYN; 1	GYN; 2	GYN; 3	INT3; 1; 10	INT3; 2 Ret	INT3; 3 DNS	18th	1

=== Complete Formula Regional European Championship results ===
(key) (Races in bold indicate pole position) (Races in italics indicate fastest lap)

Year	Team	1	2	3	4	5	6	7	8	9	10	11	12	13	14	15	16	17	18	19	20	DC	Points
2023	G4 Racing	IMO; 1	IMO; 2	CAT; 1	CAT; 2	HUN; 1	HUN; 2	SPA; 1	SPA; 2	MUG; 1	MUG; 2	LEC; 1	LEC; 2	RBR; 1	RBR; 2	MNZ; 1	MNZ; 2	ZAN; 1; 26	ZAN; 2; 22	HOC; 1; 24	HOC; 2; 26	NC†	0

^{†} As Soldavini was a guest driver, he was ineligible to score points.

=== Complete Euroformula Open Championship results ===
(key) (Races in bold indicate pole position) (Races in italics indicate fastest lap)

Year	Entrant	1	2	3	4	5	6	7	8	9	10	11	12	13	14	15	16	17	18	19	20	21	22	23	24	DC	Points
2025	Nielsen Racing	PRT; 1	PRT; 2	PRT; 3	SPA; 1	SPA; 2	SPA; 3	HOC; 1	HOC; 2	HOC; 3	HUN; 1	HUN; 2	HUN; 3	LEC; 1	LEC; 2	LEC; 3	RBR; 1; 10	RBR; 2; 10	RBR; 3; 9	CAT; 1	CAT; 2	CAT; 3	MNZ; 1	MNZ; 2	MNZ; 3	20th	4
