= Full Time Sports =

(Brazil) Full Time Sports
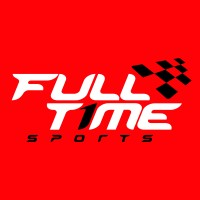
- Founded: 2004
- Base: Vinhedo, São Paulo
- Team principal(s): Maurício Ferreira
- Current series: Stock Car Brasil; Campeonato Brasileiro de Turismo; F4 Brazilian Championship
- Former series: F3 Sudamericana; Formula Renault; GT3 Brasil; Super Clio
- Current drivers: Stock Car Brasil 6.Tony Kanaan; 91. Eduardo Barrichello; 101. Gianluca Petecof; 111. Rubens Barrichello; 117. Matias Rossi F4 Brazil: 41. Fernando Barrichello; 33. Nelson Neto; 69. Pedro Clerot; 5. Ricardo Gracia
- Noted drivers: Rubens Barrichello; Allam Khodair; Bia Figueiredo; Lucas Foresti; Alberto Valério; Diego Nunes; Giulio Borlengui; Vitor Baptista; Eduardo Barrichello; Gianluca Petecof; Arthur Leist; Ricardo Gracia; Nélson Neto; Fernando Barrichello; Pedro Clerot; Rafael Sukuzi
- Teams' Championships: 1 (2014 Stock Car Brasil season); F4 Brazilian Championship; 2022
- Drivers' Championships: 1 (2014 Stock Car Brasil season); F4 Brazilian Championship; 2022:Pedro Clerot
- Website: http://www.fulltimesport.com/

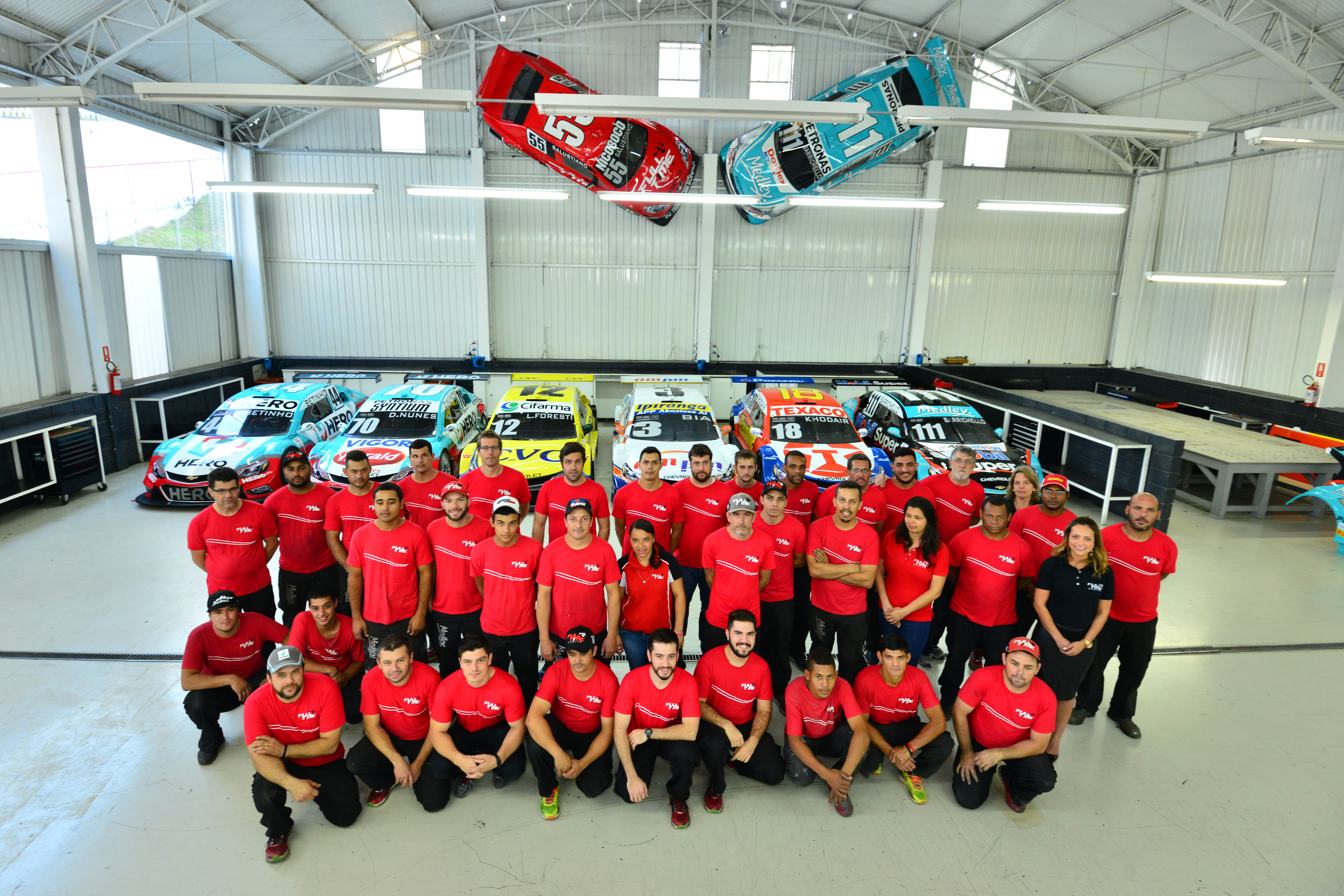
The team's headquarters in Vinhedo, São Paulo

Full Time Sports is a Brazilian professional auto racing team currently competing in Stock Car Pro Series, Stock Series, and F4 Brazil. The team is based in Vinhedo, São Paulo. The team has won the Stock Car Brasil championship twice, with Rubens Barrichello in 2014 (with Chevrolet) and in 2022 (with Toyota).

== Current series results ==
=== F4 Brazilian Championship ===
| Year | Chassis | Tyres | Drivers | Races | Wins | Poles | F. Laps | Podiums | D.C. | Pts | T.C. | Pts |
|---|---|---|---|---|---|---|---|---|---|---|---|---|
| 2022 | Tatuus F4-T421 | P | (Brazil) Ricardo Gracia Filho | 18 | 1 | 0 | 1 | 2 | 9th | 95 | 1st | 488 |
| 2022 | Tatuus F4-T421 | P | (Brazil) Nelson Neto | 18 | 0 | 0 | 0 | 0 | 10th | 56 | 1st | 488 |
| 2022 | Tatuus F4-T421 | P | (Brazil) Fernando Barrichello | 18 | 2 | 2 | 3 | 5 | 4th | 135 | 1st | 488 |
| 2022 | Tatuus F4-T421 | P | (Brazil) Pedro Clerot | 18 | 7 | 4 | 7 | 11 | 1st | 276 | 1st | 488 |

=== Stock Car Pro Series ===
| Year | Chassis | Tyres | Drivers | Races | Wins | Poles | F. Laps | Podiums | D.C. | Pts | T.C. | Pts |
|---|---|---|---|---|---|---|---|---|---|---|---|---|
| 2022 | Toyota Corolla | P | | | | | | | | | | |
| 2022 | Toyota Corolla | P | (Brazil) Tony Kanaan | 23 | 0 | 0 | 0 | 0 | 22nd | 102 | N/A | N/A |
| 2022 | Toyota Corolla | P | (Brazil) Rafael Suzuki | 23 | 0 | 0 | 0 | 0 | 13th | 172 | N/A | |
| 2022 | Toyota Corolla | P | (Brazil) Rubens Barrichello | 23 | 3 | 1 | 1 | 7 | 1st | 330 | N/A | |

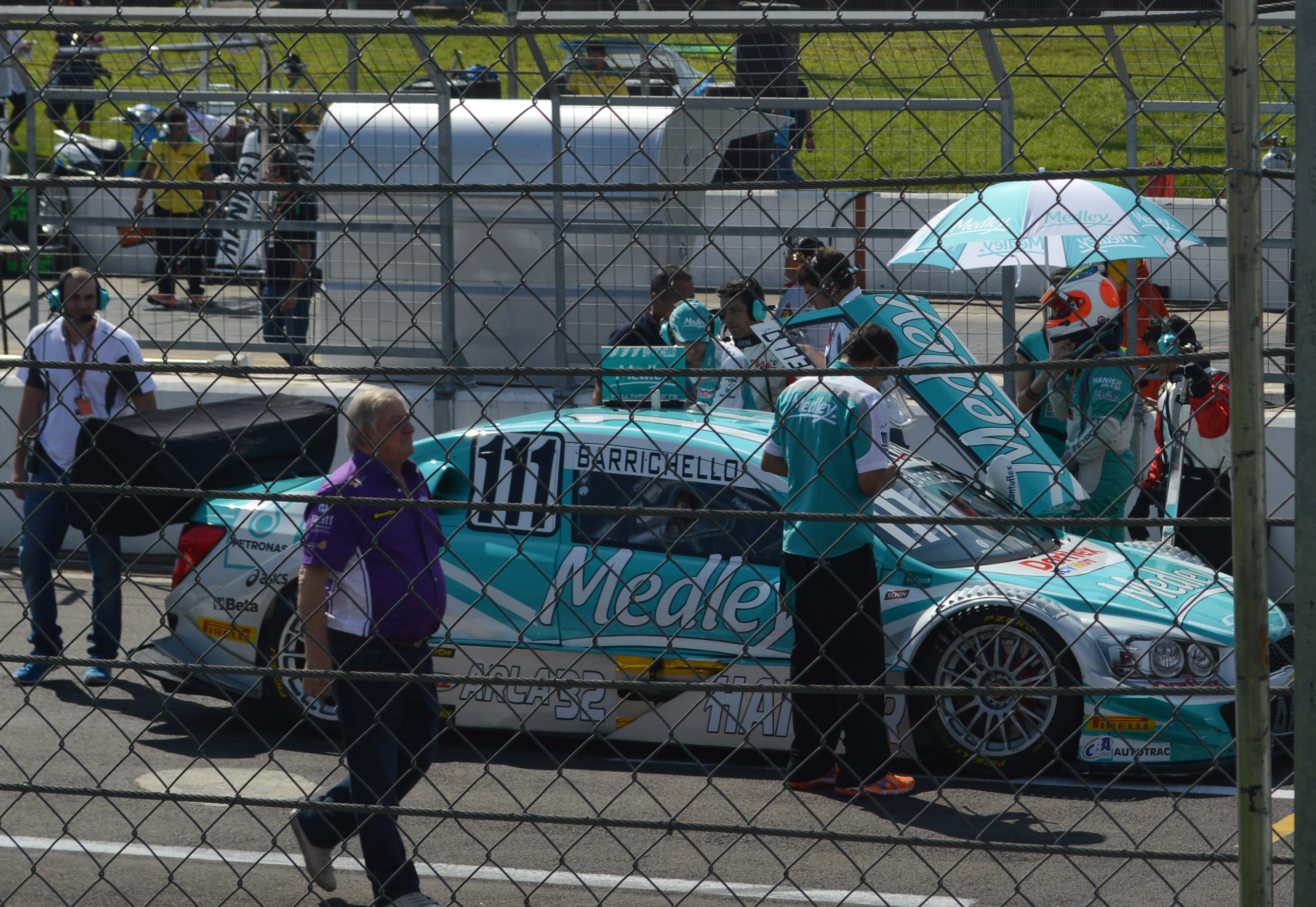
Barrichello's car in Stock Car Brasil in 2014.

== Timeline ==
Current series
| Stock Car Brasil | 2007–present |
| NASCAR Brasil Series | 2025–present |
Former series
| F4 Brazilian Championship | 2022 |
