= Cavaleiro Sports =

Brazilian professional auto racing team

(Brazil) Cavaleiro Sports
- Founded: 2013
- Nation: Brazil
- Base: Guarulhos, São Paulo, Brazil
- Team principal(s): Beto Cavaleiro
- Current series: Stock Car Brasil; F4 Brazil
- Current drivers: Stock Car Pro Series: 5. (Brazil) Denis Navarro; 80. (Brazil) Marcos Gomes; F4 Brazilian Championship: 24. (Brazil) Felipe Barrichello; 29. (Brazil) João Tesser; 31. (Brazil) Nicolas Giaffone; 30. (Brazil) Vinícius Tessaro
- Noted drivers: Denis Navarro; Marcos Gomes; Felipe Barrichello; João Tesser; Nicolas Giaffone; Vinícius Tessaro
- Points: 200
- Website: http://www.cavaleiroracing.com/

Cavaleiro Sports is a Brazilian professional auto racing team based in Guarulhos, São Paulo. The team currently competes in Stock Car Brasil and Brazilian F4.

== Results ==
=== Formula 4 Brazilian Championship ===
Year	Chassis	Tyres	Drivers	Races	Wins	Poles	F. Laps	Podiums	Pts	D.C.	T.C.	Pts
2022	Tatuus F4-T421	P	(Brazil) Vinícius Tessaro	18	0	0	0	0	163	3rd	2nd	400
2022	Tatuus F4-T421	P	(Brazil) Felipe Barrichello Bartz	18	2	0	2	5	135	4th	2nd	400
2022	Tatuus F4-T421	P	(Brazil) Nicolas Giaffone	18	3	0	1	6	129	5th	2nd	400
2022	Tatuus F4-T421	P	(Brazil) João Tesser	18	0	0	0	4	20	14th	2nd	400
2023	Tatuus F4-T421	P	(Brazil) Vinícius Tessaro	18	6	3	9	9	233	1st	1st	492
2023	Tatuus F4-T421	P	(Brazil) Fernando Barrichello	15	0	0	1	6	140	5th	1st	492
2023	Tatuus F4-T421	P	(Brazil) Lucca Zucchini	18	1	1	0	4	107	7th	1st	492
2023	Tatuus F4-T421	P	(Brazil) Mateus Callejas	10	1	0	0	3	61	9th	1st	492
2023	Tatuus F4-T421	P	(Brazil) Nelson Neto	18	1	0	0	3	118	6th	1st	492
2023	Tatuus F4-T421	P	(Brazil) Cecília Rabelo	12	0	2	0	0	16	15th	1st	492

=== Stock Car Pro Series ===
Year	Chassis	Tyres	Drivers	Races	Wins	Poles	F. Laps	Podiums	D.C.	Pts	T.C.	Pts
2017	Chevrolet Cruze Stock Car	P	(Brazil) Rafael Suzuki	22	0	0	0	1	18th	93	N/A	222
2017	Chevrolet Cruze Stock Car	P	(Brazil) Felipe Lapenna	18	0	0	0	1	24th	64	N/A	222
2018	Chevrolet Cruze Stock Car	P	(Brazil) Denis Navarro	21	0	0	0	0	23rd	23	N/A	26
2018	Chevrolet Cruze Stock Car	P	(Brazil) Galid Osman	19	0	0	0	0	33rd	4	N/A	26
2019	Chevrolet Cruze Stock Car	P	(Brazil) Denis Navarro	21	0	0	1	1	20th	110	N/A	156
2019	Chevrolet Cruze Stock Car	P	(Brazil) Felipe Lapenna	19	0	0	0	0	27th	46	N/A	156
2020	Chevrolet Cruze Stock Car	P	(Brazil) Denis Navarro	18	0	0	0	0	16th	134	N/A	222
2020	Chevrolet Cruze Stock Car	P	(Brazil) Marcos Gomes	18	0	0	0	0	21st	88	N/A	222
2021	Chevrolet Cruze Stock Car	P	(Brazil) Denis Navarro	24	0	0	0	0	12th	206	N/A	422
2021	Chevrolet Cruze Stock Car	P	(Brazil) Marcos Gomes	24	0	0	0	1	11th	216	N/A	422
2022	Chevrolet Cruze Stock Car	P	(Brazil) Denis Navarro	23	0	0	0	1	27th	86	N/A	210
2022	Chevrolet Cruze Stock Car	P	(Brazil) Marcos Gomes	23	0	0	0	4	21st	124	N/A	210
