= F4 Brazilian Championship =

Racing series

- Category: FIA Formula 4
- Country: Brazil
- Inaugural season: 2022
- Constructors: Tatuus
- Engine suppliers: Abarth
- Tyre suppliers: Hankook
- Drivers' champion: (Brazil) Heitor Dall'Agnol
- Teams' champion: (Brazil) TMG Racing

F4 Brazilian Championship is a racing series regulated according to FIA Formula 4 regulations. Originally, the agreement was signed between CBA (Confederação Brasileira de Automobilismo) and F / Promo Racing, the company that already organized Formula Vee competitions in Brazil. The latter was replaced by Vicar, the organizer of Stock Car Brasil, before the inaugural season in 2022.

== History ==
Gerhard Berger and the FIA Singleseater Commission launched Formula 4 in March 2013. The goal of the Formula 4 was to make the ladder to Formula 1 more transparent. Besides sporting and technical regulations, costs are also regulated. A car to compete in this category may not exceed €30,000 and a single season in Formula 4 may not exceed €100,000.

== Car ==
Italian race car constructor Tatuus F4-T014 was planned to be chosen as the official series car. Due to delay of the inauguration, the series used newer Tatuus F4-T421 models.

== Champions ==
=== Drivers ===
| Season | Driver | Team | Races | Poles | Wins | Podiums | Fastest lap | Points | Margins |
|---|---|---|---|---|---|---|---|---|---|
| 2022 | (Brazil) Pedro Clerot | (Brazil) Full Time Sports | 18 of 18 | 4 | 7 | 11 | 7 | 276 | 63 |
| 2023 | (Brazil) Vinícius Tessaro | (Brazil) Cavaleiro Sports | 18 of 18 | 3 | 6 | 9 | 9 | 233 | 17 |
| 2024 | (Brazil) Matheus Comparatto | (Brazil) Oakberry Bassani F4 | 23 of 24 | 4 | 5 | 15 | 2 | 337 | 30 |
| 2025 | (Brazil) Heitor Dall'Agnol | (Brazil) TMG Racing | 15 of 18 | 3 | 4 | 11 | 7 | 243 | 39 |

=== Teams ===
| Season | Team | Poles | Wins | Podiums | Fastest lap | Points | Margins |
|---|---|---|---|---|---|---|---|
| 2022 | (Brazil) Full Time Sports | 4 | 10 | 17 | 9 | 488 | 88 |
| 2023 | (Brazil) Cavaleiro Sports | 6 | 7 | 20 | 10 | 492 | 50 |
| 2024 | (Brazil) TMG Racing | 9 | 13 | 35 | 12 | 738 | 193 |
| 2025 | (Brazil) TMG Racing | 5 | 10 | 27 | 11 | 585 | 192 |

== Circuits ==
- **Bold** denotes a circuit will be used in the 2026 season.

| Number | Circuits | Rounds | Years |
|---|---|---|---|
| 1 | (Brazil) **Autódromo José Carlos Pace** | 16 (Note: Interlagos Circuit hosted 4 rounds in 2023, 3 rounds in 2022 and 2024—2025, and it hosts 2 rounds in 2026.) | 2022–present |
| 2 | (Brazil) **Autódromo Velo Città** | 9 (Note: Autódromo Velo Città hosted 3 rounds in 2025, and 2 rounds in 2022 and 2024.) | 2022–present |
| 3 | (Brazil) **Autódromo Internacional Ayrton Senna (Goiânia)** | 4 (Note: Autódromo Internacional Ayrton Senna (Goiânia) hosted 2 rounds in 2024.) | 2022–2024 |
| 4 | (Argentina) Autódromo Oscar y Juan Gálvez | 1 | 2024 |
| 5 | (Brazil) **Autódromo Internacional de Brasília** | 1 | 2026 |
| 5 | (Brazil) **Autódromo Internacional de Cascavel** | 1 | 2026 |
