= TMG Racing =

(Brazil) TMG Racing
- Founded: 2003 (as AMG Motorsport); 2015 (as TMG Racing)
- Team principal(s): Thiago Meneghel
- Current series: Stock Car Brasil; F4 Brazilian Championship
- Current drivers: TMG Racing; 8. Rafael Suzuki; 19. Felipe Massa
- Drivers' Championships: Stock Series; 2007. Norberto Gresse
- Website: http://www.tmgracing.com.br

TMG Racing, previously called AMG Motorsport, is a Brazilian auto racing team based in Americana, São Paulo that currently competes in Stock Car Brasil and the F4 Brazilian Championship. Created in the 2003 final, AMG Motorsport originated from the G5 Racing team, directed by Mr. Affonso Giaffone and with the participation of partners Maurício Matos, Edvaldo Zaghetti and Alex Gesell.

In 2011, the departure of one of the three partners is announced, Mr. Mauricio Matos - team leader - and the entry of Thiago Meneghel to occupy the same position in 2012. With that, the team is renamed TMG Racing, the name used until the present day and commanded exclusively by this one. Starting in 2017, the team had the support of Shell V-Power, with Átila Abreu and Ricardo Zonta. This partnership ended at the end of the 2019 season. From 2020, the team changed its Stock Car colors and begins to have a partnership with Blau Motorsport. The partnership lasted until 2022, with Blau joining forces with R.Mattheis Motorsport. and Lubrax Team for 2023 season. (Note: In the Stock Car Pro Series) due to sponsorship reasons,
