= 2024 NASCAR Brasil Sprint Race =

South American auto racing season

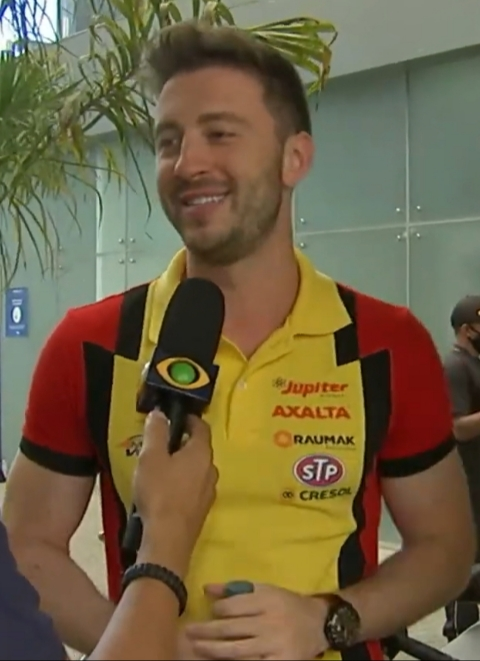
Gabriel Casagrande, along with Alex Seid who is not pictured, are the 2024 Brasil Sprint Race overall co-champions

The 2024 NASCAR Brasil Series was the second season of NASCAR Brasil after the rebrand of "Sprint Race" Series. It consisted of 8 rounds starting in March 13 in Autódromo Internacional Orlando Moura, Campo Grande and finished in November 15 in the first banked oval build in Brazil at Circuito dos Cristais in Curvelo. For 2024 was kept the format where the series run all of the cars, but different from 2023 a sub-division in teams was created, resulting in drivers being selected to race for UNIKKA Racing, Race Engineering, Singus Competition and Maxon Racing.

All teams used the same car with a V6 3.6L 300 hp engine and aesthetics made to look like the Chevrolet Camaro and Ford Mustang. Different from 2023, in 2024 the AM and Pro/AM subclasses were merged and the Challenge subclass was created and the Pro class was renamed as NASCAR Brasil.

Parallel to the Overall championship the drivers compete in the Brazil Championship and in the Special Edition rounds, resulting in three different championships through the season. Vitor Genz was the Brazil Championship champion while Gabriel Casagrande and Alex Seid were both the Overall and Special edition champions in the NASCAR Brasil class, while Jorge Martelli was the champion in the Challenge in the Brasil Championship and Victor Andrade was both the Overall and Special edition champion.

For the 2024 NASCAR Brasil season different guest drivers appeared throughout the season, Daniel Suárez from NASCAR Cup Series was the first for the Interlagos round, Stock Car Pro Series champion Cacá Bueno was present in the Potenza round to return to motorsport after an injury, and Arianna Casoli from NASCAR Euro Series appeared for the last round in the Circuito dos Cristais first oval race.

== Schedule ==
The 2024 NASCAR Brasil Sprint Race schedule was released on October 24, 2023, with 8 rounds, on May 13 the Santa Cruz do Sul round scheduled for June 13 was movent to Potenza track in Lima Duarte in Minas Gerais state following the 2024 Rio Grande do Sul floods. On August 4 the Circuito dos Cristais Oval track was announced as the last round, debuting the first banked oval track of Brazil.

Location of circuits which host a NASCAR Brasil Series round in 2024

Round	Track	Date
1	Autódromo Internacional Orlando Moura; Mato Grosso do Sul, Campo Grande	12–13 March
2	(Goiás) Autódromo Internacional Ayrton Senna (Goiânia) (External), Goiânia	11–12 April
3	(Paraná (state)) Autódromo Internacional Ayrton Senna; Paraná, Londrina	09-10 May
4	Autódromo Internacional Potenza; Minas Gerais, Lima Duarte	12–13 June
5	(São Paulo (state)) Autódromo José Carlos Pace; São Paulo, São Paulo	01-2 August
6	(Paraná (state)) Autódromo Internacional de Cascavel; Paraná, Cascavel	29–30 August
7	Autódromo Internacional de Tarumã; Rio Grande do Sul, Viamão	14–15 November
8	Circuito dos Cristais; Minas Gerais, Curvelo	6–7 December

Notes:

Brazilian Championship round
Special Edition round

== Results ==
Bold indicates overall winner.

Round	Circuit	Pole position	NASCAR Brasil Winners	NASCAR Challenge Winners
1	(Mato Grosso do Sul) Autódromo Internacional Orlando Moura	(Brazil) Vitor Genz	(Brazil) **Léo Reis**	(Brazil) Victor Andrade
2	(Mato Grosso do Sul) Autódromo Internacional Orlando Moura	(Brazil) Léo Reis	(Brazil) **Gabriel Casagrande/ (Brazil)** **Alex Seid**	(Brazil) Gui Backes
3	(Goiás) Autódromo Internacional Ayrton Senna (Goiânia)	(Portugal) Lourenço Beirão	(Brazil) Vitor Genz	(Brazil) **Jorge Martelli**
4	(Goiás) Autódromo Internacional Ayrton Senna (Goiânia)	(Brazil) Gabriel Casagrande/ (Brazil) Alex Seid	(Brazil) **Gabriel Casagrande/ (Brazil)** **Alex Seid**	(Brazil) Jorge Martelli
5	(Paraná (state)) Autódromo Internacional Ayrton Senna	(Brazil) Léo Reis	(Brazil) **Léo Reis**	(Brazil) Felipe Tozzo
6	(Paraná (state)) Autódromo Internacional Ayrton Senna	(Brazil) Vitor Genz	(Brazil) **Cayan Chianca**	(Brazil) Jorge Martelli
7	(Minas Gerais) Autódromo Internacional Potenza	(Brazil) Cacá Bueno	(Brazil) **Cayan Chianca**	(Brazil) Nicholas Monteiro
8	(Minas Gerais) Autódromo Internacional Potenza	(Brazil) Witold Ramazauskas	(Brazil) **Gabriel Casagrande/** (Brazil) **Alex Seid**	(Brazil) Victor Andrade
9	(São Paulo (state)) Autódromo José Carlos Pace	(Brazil) Cayan Chianca	(Brazil) **Léo Torres**	(Brazil) Victor Andrade
10	(São Paulo (state)) Autódromo José Carlos Pace	(Brazil) Gabriel Casagrande/ (Brazil) Alex Seid	(Mexico) **Daniel Suárez**	(Brazil) Beto Monteiro
11	(São Paulo (state)) Autódromo José Carlos Pace	(Mexico) Daniel Suárez	(Brazil) **Gabriel Casagrande/ (Brazil)** **Alex Seid**	(Brazil) Júlio Campos
12	(Paraná (state)) Autódromo Internacional de Cascavel	(Brazil) Léo Reis	(Brazil) **Vitor Genz**	(Brazil) Jorge Martelli
13	(Paraná (state)) Autódromo Internacional de Cascavel	(Brazil) Vitor Genz	(Brazil) **Vitor Genz**	(Brazil) Jorge Martelli
14	(Rio Grande do Sul) Autódromo Internacional de Tarumã	(Brazil) Cayan Chianca	(Brazil) **Cayan Chianca**	(Brazil) Victor Andrade
15	(Rio Grande do Sul) Autódromo Internacional de Tarumã	(Brazil) Cayan Chianca	(Brazil) **Léo Torres**	(Brazil) Victor Andrade
16	(Minas Gerais) Circuito dos Cristais	(Brazil) Vitor Genz	(Brazil) **Cayan Chianca**	
17	(Minas Gerais) Circuito dos Cristais	(Brazil) Gui Backes		(Brazil) **Victor Andrade**
18	(Minas Gerais) Circuito dos Cristais	(Brazil) Victor Andrade	(Brazil) Léo Torres	(Brazil) **Gui Backes**

Note: For the Curvelo round, both the Challenge and Brasil classes ran separately in the first two races.

== Standings ==
Points are awarded to the driver's entry. While the drivers from all classes would compete at the same time, they would only score points on their respective classes. If an entrant entered two drivers, then both drivers would earn points for their entry. Drivers must complete at least 75% of the race in order to be classified for points. Drivers are allowed to discard points from one Special Edition score and one Brazilian championship score towards their final tally in the overall standings.

Overall Standings:

Pos	Driver	Points
NASCAR Brasil Championship
1	(Brazil) Gabriel Casagrande/ (Brazil) Alex Seid	330
2	(Brazil) VItor Genz	299
3	(Brazil) Léo Reis	278
4	(Brazil) Cayan Chianca	270
5	(Brazil) Léo Torres	252
6	(Portugal) Lourenço Beirão	196
7	(Brazil) Rafa Dias	195
8	(Brazil) Witold Ramasauskas	180
9	(Brazil) Lucas Mendes	177
10	(Brazil) Sérgio Ramalho	145
11	(Brazil) Luan Lopes	135
12	(Brazil) Valdeno Brito	95
13	(Brazil) Antonio Junqueira	73
14	(Brazil) Thiago Lopes	64
15	(Brazil) Beto Monteiro	62
16	(Brazil) Dorivaldo Gondra Jr.	53
17	(Brazil) Jeff Giassi	42
18	(Brazil) Edson Reis	32
19	(Brazil) Arthur Scherer	28
20	(Brazil) Vinny Azevedo	26
21	(Italy) Arianna Casoli	19
NASCAR Challenge Championship
1	(Brazil) Victor Andrade	366
2	(Brazil) Jorge Martelli	297
3	(Brazil) Gui Backes	277
5	(Brazil) Luís Trombini	230
4	(Brazil) Felipe Tozzo	228
6	(Brazil) Gabryel Romano	207
7	(Brazil) Nicholas Monteiro	172
8	(Brazil) Léo Yoshii	158
9	(Brazil) Marcel Jorand	106
10	(Brazil) Giovanni Girotto	105
11	(Brazil) Julio Campos	92
12	(Brazil) Dorivaldo Gondra Jr.	71
13	(Brazil) Alexandre Kauê	65
14	(Brazil) Edson Reis	64
15	(Brazil) Brendon Zonta	55
20	(Brazil) Carlos Cunha	46
16	(Brazil) Rodrigo Sperafico	42
19	(Brazil) Antonio Carvalho	40
17	(Brazil) Beto Monteiro	37
18	(Brazil) Thiago Lopes	36
21	(Brazil) Zezinho Muggiati	29
22	(Brazil) MC Gui	28
23	(Brazil) Leandro Totti	24
24	(Brazil) Luis Debes	16
25	(Brazil) Rafael Seibel	15

Note: NASCAR Brasil official standings.

== See also ==
- 2024 NASCAR Cup Series
- 2024 NASCAR Xfinity Series
- 2024 NASCAR Craftsman Truck Series
- 2024 ARCA Menards Series
- 2024 ARCA Menards Series East
- 2024 ARCA Menards Series West
- 2024 NASCAR Whelen Modified Tour
- 2024 NASCAR Canada Series
- 2024 NASCAR Mexico Series
- 2024 NASCAR Whelen Euro Series
- 2024 CARS Tour
- 2024 SMART Modified Tour
