= Edson Reis =

Brazilian racing driver

- Born: 22 December 1982 (age 43) Curitiba, Paraná (Brazil)

NASCAR Brasil Series career
- Debut season: 2023
- Current team: Maxon Racing Team
- Car number: 12
- Starts: 34
- Wins: 1
- Podiums: 12
- Poles: 1

Previous series
- Turismo Nacional Brasil; Hyundai HB20 Cup; GT3 Porsche Cup Brazil; TCR South America

Edson Leandro dos Reis, also known as Edson Reis, (born December 22, 1982.) in Curitiba, Paraná, Brazil is a professional racing driver. He currently competes in the NASCAR Brasil Sprint Race.

== Career ==
Reis began his racing career at the age of 14 by participating in kart races. He took a break from motorsports and returned to racing in 2016.

In that year, Reis competed in his first racing car event, the Paraná Dirty Race Championship, in the Turismo 1,600 Injected category, where he secured only three points. He then participated in touring races in 2017 and 2018 to prepare for the Cascavel de Ouro, a renowned Brazilian motorsport race. He teamed up with Lucas Bornemann and finished the race in 24th place, gaining 29 positions during the three-hour race.

Over the next few years, Reis participated in various categories of Brazilian motorsport, including finishing second in the 2019 Turismo Nacional championship, competing in the 2020 Copa HB20 championship, and earning victories in the Porsche Cup in his hometown in 2021. He also joined experienced driver Sérgio Jimenez in endurance races of Porsche Cup. That same year, he secured fourth place in the Porsche Cup GT3 Endurance category and 5th place in the Porsche Cup GT3 Trophy standings. In 2022, he achieved an impressive second place finish in the Interlagos race and a victory in Rivera, Uruguay, in the 2022 TCR South America Championship, however, his season ended prematurely due to a severe accident that left him with two broken ribs and a labyrinth problem, requiring several months of recovery

In 2023, Reis made his debut in the AM division of NASCAR Brasil and secured two fifth positions in the first races held in Goiânia and finish second twice in the Interlagos racing. Later, he achieved several podium finishes and one race victory, finishing as the vice-champion of the AM Special Edition and securing third place overall in the 2023 season.

In 2024, Edson Reis traveled to the United States to participate in tests at the New Smyrna Speedway, gaining valuable experience with NASCAR vehicles and strengthening his connection with the series internationally. That same year, however, Reis faced challenges, including mechanical failures and accidents, he finished the Special Edition in 11th place and ranked 14th overall in the NASCAR Brasil season standings.

== Results summary ==
=== Racing highlights ===
- 2019: Vice-champion, Turismo Nacional Brasil – 2B
- 2020: 9th place, Copa HB20 – Super
- 2021: 4th place, Porsche Cup GT3 Endurance, 5th place, Porsche Cup GT3 Trophy
- 2023: Vice-champion, AM Special Edition, NASCAR Brasil; 3rd overall
- 2024: 11th place, Special Edition, NASCAR Brasil; 14th overall

=== Racing career summary ===
- Races Participated: 132
- Wins: 6
- Podiums: 39
- Pole Positions: 3
- Win Percentage: 4.54%
- Podium Percentage: 29.55%
