= Circuito dos Cristais =

Race track in Curvelo, Brazil

- Location: Curvelo, Minas Gerais, Brazil
- Coordinates: 18°48′25″S 44°24′30″W
- Broke ground: 2013
- Opened: September 2016; 10 years ago
- Former names: Autódromo de Curvelo
- Major events: Current: TCR South America (2025–present); Stock Car Pro Series (2016–2017, 2025–present); TCR Brazil (2025–present); NASCAR Brasil Series (2024–present); Copa Truck (2018–2019, 2024–present)

Full Circuit (2016–present)
- Length: 4.400 km (2.734 mi)
- Turns: 17
- Race lap record: 1:51.941 ( (Brazil) Marcos Gomes, Peugeot 408 Stock Car, 2016, Stock Car Brasil)

Short Circuit (2017–present)
- Length: 3.330 km (2.069 mi)
- Turns: 16
- Race lap record: 1:20.772 ( (Brazil) Guilherme Salas, Chevrolet Tracker, 2026, Stock Car Pro)

Oval Circuit (2024–present)
- Length: 1.250 km (0.777 mi)
- Turns: 2
- Banking: 16°
- Race lap record: 0:29.345 ( (Brazil) Vitor Genz, Ford Mustang NASCAR Brasil, 2026, NASCAR Brasil)

The Circuito dos Cristais is a race track located in the Brazilian city of Curvelo, in the state of Minas Gerais.

Located 150 km (93 mi) north from the capital Belo Horizonte, the racetrack was built according to the rules of the FIM and the FIA.

The venue opened in 2016, and hosted rounds of the Stock Car Brasil and Copa Truck.

In August 2024, it was announced that the 1.250 km (0.777 mi) banked oval track was built for the season finale of NASCAR Brasil Series, and the circuit would have contract with the series until 2026.

On September 20, 2026, at the track Tatiana Calderón became the first woman to win a race in the NASCAR Brasil Series.

== Events ==
Current

- March: TCR South America Touring Car Championship, Stock Car Pro Series, TCR Brazil Touring Car Championship
- September: Stock Car Pro Series, Copa Truck, NASCAR Brasil Series, Stock Light, Turismo Nacional BR

Former

- Brasileiro de Marcas (2016)
- Mercedes-Benz Challenge (2018–2019)

== Lap records ==
As of September 2026, the fastest official lap records at the Circuito dos Cristais are listed as:

Category	Time	Driver	Vehicle	Event
Full Circuit (2016–present): 4.400 km (2.734 mi)
Stock Car Brasil	1:51.941	Marcos Gomes	Peugeot 408 Stock Car	2016 Curvelo Stock Car Brasil round
Campeonato Brasileiro de Turismo	1:59.573	Márcio Campos	Chevrolet Cruze JL-G12	2016 Curvelo Campeonato Brasileiro de Turismo round
Short Circuit (2017–present): 3.330 km (2.069 mi)
Stock Car Pro	1:20.772	Guilherme Salas	Chevrolet Tracker	2026 2nd Curvelo Stock Car Pro round
TCR Touring Car	1:24.514	Leonel Pernía	Honda Civic Type R TCR (FL5)	2026 Curvelo TCR South America round
Stock Light	1:24.971	João Bortoluzzi	Chevrolet Cruze JL-G12	2026 Curvelo Stock Light round
Mercedes-Benz Challenge	1:34.327	Fernando Júnior	Mercedes-Benz CLA AMG	2019 Curvelo Mercedes-Benz Challenge round
Turismo Nacional BR	1:37.948	Adilson Junior	Chevrolet New Onix	2026 Curvelo Turismo Nacional Brasil round
Truck racing	1:47.705	Felipe Giaffone	Volkswagen Truck	2018 Curvelo Copa Truck round
Oval Circuit (2024–present): 1.250 km (0.777 mi)
NASCAR Brasil	0:29.345	Vitor Genz	Ford Mustang NASCAR Brasil	2026 Curvelo NASCAR Brasil round
