= 2018 Copa Truck season =

Truck racing competition

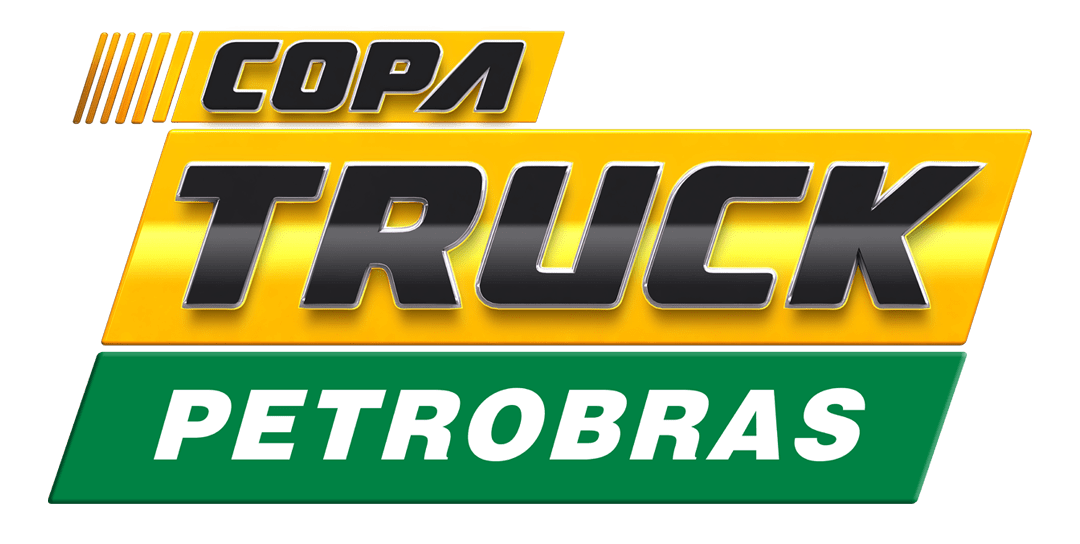
Official Logo

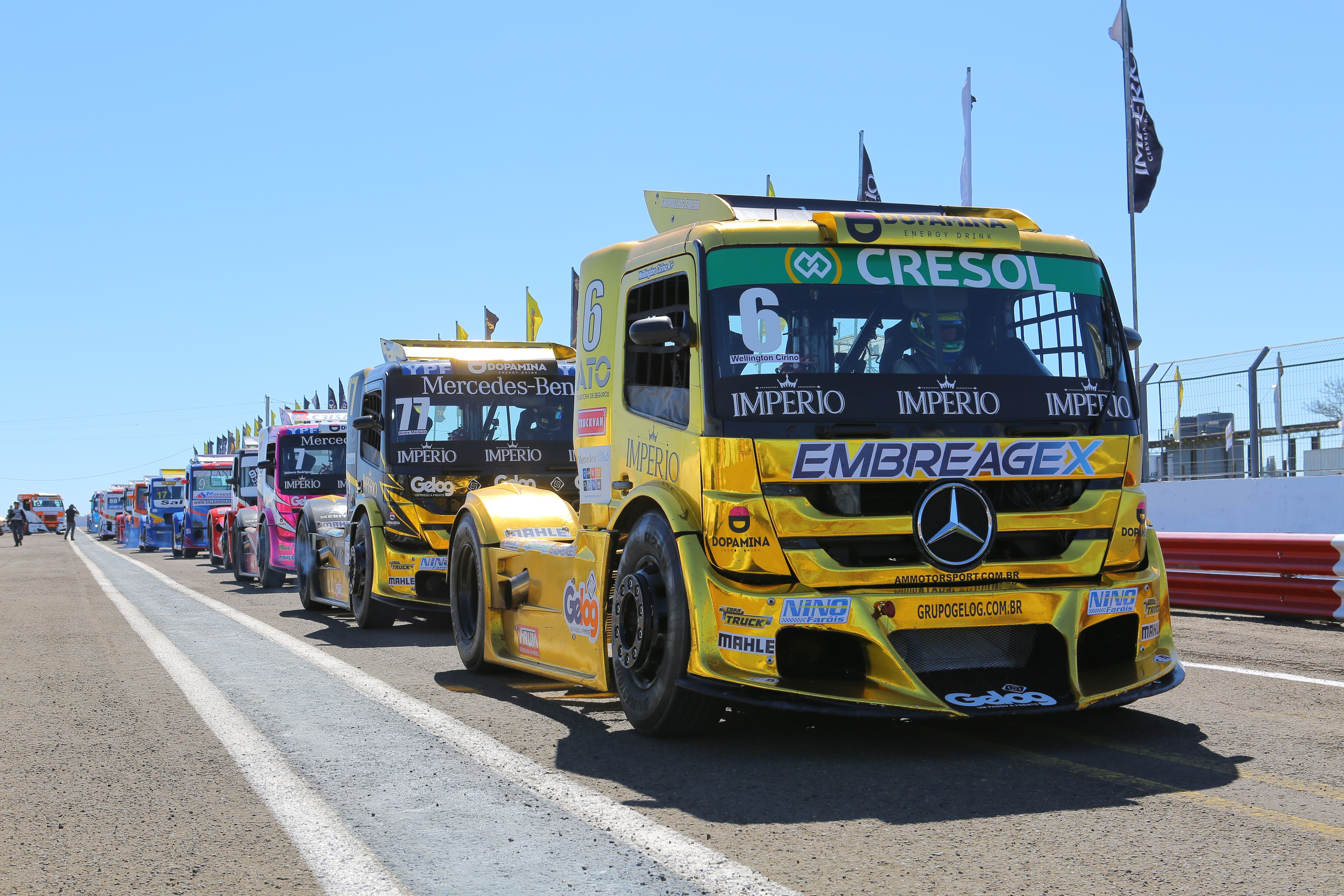
Copa Truck event

The 2018 Campeonato Brasileiro de Copa Truck was the second season of the Copa Truck. Roberval Andrade became the 2018 Copa Truck Champion in a Scania from Corinthians-Dakar Motorsport.

The category's origins came after nine teams left Formula Truck due to disagreements with the problematic management of Neusa Navarro Félix. These teams joined together in an association to create the category that replaced Formula Truck. The new category brings together teams and drivers from the old category.

In November 2017, it was approved by the Brazilian Automobile Confederation (CBA) and recognized as an official championship. Carlos Col, former head of the Stock Car Pro Series, is its promoter.

The Truck Cup was officially launched on April 27, 2017, in São Paulo. In the first season, the championship was divided into three regional cups: Midwest, Northeast, and Southeast. The first stage took place on May 28, in Goiânia, with 17 trucks on the grid.

The association is made up of the following teams: RM Competições, AJ5 Sports, DF Motorsport, RVR Motorsports, Dakar Motors, Fábio Fogaça Motorsports, Lucar Motorsports and Clay Truck Racing.

== Teams and drivers ==
Manufacturer	Team	No.	Driver	Rounds
(United States) Ford	Ford AJ5	5	(Brazil) Adalberto Jardim	3–7
(United States) Ford	Original Reis Peças	12	(Brazil) José Maria Reis	1
(United States) Ford	DF Motorsport	27	(Brazil) Fábio Fogaça	1–7
(United States) Ford	DF Motorsport	72	(Brazil) Djalma Fogaça	1–3
(Italy) Iveco	Lucar Motorsport	88	(Brazil) Beto Monteiro	1–7
(Italy) Iveco	Lucar Motorsport	99	(Brazil) Luiz Lopes	1–7
(Italy) Iveco	Paraguay Racing/Dakar Motorsport	90	(Brazil) Giuliano Losacco	1–7
(Germany) MAN SE	RM Competições	9	(Brazil) Renato Martins	3
(Germany) MAN SE	RM Competições	11	(Brazil) Witold Ramasauskas	1–2
(Germany) MAN SE	RM Competições	13	(Brazil) Witold Ramasauskas	3–7
(Germany) MAN SE	RM Competições	72	(Brazil) Djalma Fogaça	4–7
(Germany) Mercedes-Benz	AM Motorsports	6	(Brazil) Wellington Cirino	1–7
(Germany) Mercedes-Benz	AM Motorsports	77	(Brazil) André Marques	1–7
(Germany) Mercedes-Benz	Motul-GG Motorsport	38	(Paraguay) Alan Chanoski	3
(Germany) Mercedes-Benz	Motul-GG Motorsport	333	(Brazil) Alex Fabiano Silva	1, 3
(Germany) Mercedes-Benz	JL Competição	55	(Brazil) Paulo Salustiano	4
(Germany) Mercedes-Benz	JL Competição	73	(Brazil) Leandro Totti	6
(Germany) Mercedes-Benz	AN09 Team	909	(Brazil) Alexandre Navarro	5
(Germany) Mercedes-Benz	PP Competições	28	(Brazil) Danilo Dirani	5–6
(Germany) Mercedes-Benz	PP Competições	29	(Brazil) Pedro Paulo Fernandes	5–6
(Sweden) Scania	Dakar Motorsport-Corinthians Motorsports	15	(Brazil) Roberval Andrade	1–7
(Sweden) Scania	Dakar Motorsport-Corinthians Motorsports	55	(Brazil) Danilo Dirani	3
(Sweden) Scania	Dakar Motorsport-Corinthians Motorsports	73	(Brazil) Leandro Totti	5
(Sweden) Scania	Original Reis Peças	33	(Brazil) Eurípedes Reis	1
(Sweden) Scania	Luhrs Competições	46	(Brazil) Luiz Renato Luhrs	1–2
(Germany) Volkswagen	RM Competições	4	(Brazil) Felipe Giaffone	1–2, 4–7
(Germany) Volkswagen	RM Competições	7	(Brazil) Débora Rodrigues	1–2, 7
(Germany) Volkswagen	RM Competições	50	(Brazil) Débora Rodrigues	3–6
(Germany) Volkswagen	RM Competições	8	(Brazil) Luciano Burti	3
(Germany) Volkswagen	RM Competições	9	(Brazil) Renato Martins	1–2, 4, 6–7
(Germany) Volkswagen	RM Competições	11	(Brazil) Rodrigo Belinati	3–7
(Germany) Volkswagen	RM Competições	30	(Brazil) Rogério Castro	1–3, 5–6
(Sweden) Volvo	Boéssio Competições	47	(Brazil) Duda Bana	3–7
(Sweden) Volvo	Boéssio Competições	83	(Brazil) Régis Boéssio	1–7

== Race calendar and results ==
The Copa Truck is divided into four parallel championships with two stages (South Truck Cup, Southeast Truck Cup, Midwest Truck Cup and Mercosul Truck Cup), totaling eight stages. And a ninth stage, denominated The Great Final, will define the general champion of the category.

Rnd		Circuit	Date	Pole position	Fastest lap	Winning driver	Winning team
1	R1	(Brazil) Autódromo Internacional de Cascavel, Cascavel, Paraná	March 25	(Brazil) Felipe Giaffone	(Brazil) Felipe Giaffone	(Brazil) Wellington Cirino	AM Motorsports
1	R2	(Brazil) Autódromo Internacional de Cascavel, Cascavel, Paraná	March 25		(Brazil) Wellington Cirino	(Brazil) Giuliano Losacco	Paraguay Racing/Dakar Motorsport
2	R1	(Brazil) Autódromo Internacional de Guaporé, Guaporé, Rio Grande do Sul	April 15	(Brazil) Roberval Andrade	(Brazil) Wellington Cirino	(Brazil) Wellington Cirino	AM Motorsports
2	R2	(Brazil) Autódromo Internacional de Guaporé, Guaporé, Rio Grande do Sul	April 15		(Brazil) Felipe Giaffone	(Brazil) Felipe Giaffone	RM Competições
3	R1	(Brazil) Autódromo José Carlos Pace, Interlagos, São Paulo	May 27	(Brazil) Wellington Cirino	(Brazil) Roberval Andrade	(Brazil) Roberval Andrade	Dakar Motorsport-Corinthians Motorsports
3	R2	(Brazil) Autódromo José Carlos Pace, Interlagos, São Paulo	May 27		(Brazil) Luciano Burti	(Brazil) Roberval Andrade	Dakar Motorsport-Corinthians Motorsports
4	R1	(Brazil) Autódromo Internacional Orlando Moura, Campo Grande, Mato Grosso do Sul	July 29	(Brazil) Felipe Giaffone	(Brazil) Felipe Giaffone	(Brazil) Felipe Giaffone	RM Competições
4	R2	(Brazil) Autódromo Internacional Orlando Moura, Campo Grande, Mato Grosso do Sul	July 29		(Brazil) Felipe Giaffone	(Brazil) Roberval Andrade	Dakar Motorsport-Corinthians Motorsports
5	R1	(Brazil) Autódromo Internacional Ayrton Senna, Goiânia, Goiás	August 25	(Brazil) Wellington Cirino	(Brazil) Danilo Dirani	(Brazil) Danilo Dirani	PP Competições
5	R2	(Brazil) Autódromo Internacional Ayrton Senna, Goiânia, Goiás	August 25		(Brazil) Danilo Dirani	(Brazil) Danilo Dirani	PP Competições
6	R1	Autódromo Juan y Oscar Gálvez, Buenos Aires, Argentina	September 16	(Brazil) Wellington Cirino	(Brazil) Leandro Totti	(Brazil) Felipe Giaffone	RM Competições
6	R2	Autódromo Juan y Oscar Gálvez, Buenos Aires, Argentina	September 16		(Brazil) Beto Monteiro	(Brazil) Felipe Giaffone	RM Competições
7	R1	Autódromo Eduardo Prudêncio Cabrera, Rivera, Uruguay	October 7	(Brazil) Wellington Cirino	(Brazil) Roberval Andrade	(Brazil) Roberval Andrade	Dakar Motorsport-Corinthians Motorsports
7	R2	Autódromo Eduardo Prudêncio Cabrera, Rivera, Uruguay	October 7		(Brazil) Roberval Andrade	(Brazil) Renato Martins	RM Competições
8	R1	(Brazil) Circuito dos Cristais, Curvelo, Minas Gerais	October 28	(Brazil) Wellington Cirino	(Brazil) Danilo Dirani	(Brazil) Felipe Giaffone	RM Competições
8	R2	(Brazil) Circuito dos Cristais, Curvelo, Minas Gerais	October 28		(Brazil) Felipe Giaffone	(Brazil) Felipe Giaffone	RM Competições
9	R1	(Brazil) Autódromo Internacional de Curitiba, Pinhais, Paraná	December 2	(Brazil) Danilo Dirani	(Brazil) Roberval Andrade	(Brazil) Roberval Andrade	Dakar Motorsport-Corinthians Motorsports
9	R2	(Brazil) Autódromo Internacional de Curitiba, Pinhais, Paraná	December 2		(Brazil) Felipe Giaffone	(Brazil) Felipe Giaffone	RM Competições

== Drivers' Championship ==
=== Preliminary rounds ===
Pos	Driver	CAS		GUA		INT		CAM	GOI	BUE	RIV	CRI	CUR	South	Southwest	Midwest	Mercosul	Bonus
	Wellington Cirino	1	2	1	6	Ret	Ret							70				12
	Giuliano Losacco	7	1	7	2	DNS	DNS							60				10
	André Marques	5	3	4	4	2	3							57				8
	Felipe Giaffone	**2**	DNS	6	1									52				
	Beto Monteiro	3	11	2	7	Ret	Ret							52				
	Renato Martins	4	6	8	**3**	5	4							52				
	Régis Boéssio	6	7	9	Ret	DNS	DNS							34				
	Débora Rodrigues	8	4	5	10	8	DNS							45				
	Witold Ramasauskas	13	5	13	8	6	6							33				
	Alex Fabiano Silva	9	9	14	9	11	9							31				
	Adalberto Jardim			3	5									21				
	Luiz Lopes	11	8	12	12									29				
	Rogério Castro	14	DNS	10	Ret									16				
	Duda Bana			11	11									14				
	José Maria Reis	15	10											14				
	Djalma Fogaça	10	Ret	Ret	Ret									10				
	Fábio Fogaça	12	Ret	Ret	DNS									10				
	Luis Renato Luhrs	Ret	DNS	DNS	DNS									0				
	Roberval Andrade	Ret	DNS	**DNS**	DNS									0				
	Eurípedes Reis	DNS	DNS											0				
Pos	Driver	CAS		GUA		INT		CAM	GOI	BUE	RIV	CRI	CUR	South	Southwest	Midwest	Mercosul	Bonus

Colour	Result
Gold	Winner
Silver	Second place
Bronze	Third place
Green	Points classification
Blue	Non-points classification
Blue	Non-classified finish (NC)
Purple	Retired, not classified (Ret)
Red	Did not qualify (DNQ)
Red	Did not pre-qualify (DNPQ)
Black	Disqualified (DSQ)
White	Did not start (DNS)
White	Withdrew (WD)
White	Race cancelled (C)
Blank	Did not practice (DNP)
Blank	Did not arrive (DNA)
Blank	Excluded (EX)

**Bold** – Pole
Italics – Fastest Lap

=== Points standings ===
Points	1°	2°	3°	4°	5°	6°	7°	8°	9°	10°	11°	12°	13°	14°	15°
Race 1	22	20	18	16	15	14	13	12	11	10	9	8	7	6	5
Race 2	18	16	14	12	11	10	9	8	7	6	5	4	3	2	1

== See also ==
- 2018 Stock Car Brasil Championship
- 2018 Stock Light season
- 2018 Brasileiro de Marcas
- Moto 1000 GP
- SuperBike Brasil
- Fórmula Truck
