= 2023 NASCAR Brasil Sprint Race =

South American auto racing season

The 2023 NASCAR Brasil Sprint Race was the twelfth Sprint Race Brasil season, and the first under the NASCAR Brasil Sprint Race branding following NASCAR’s acquisition of the series in 2022. The season started on 19 March with the first round at the Autódromo Internacional Ayrton Senna in Goiânia and ended on 10 December with the second round at the Autódromo José Carlos Pace in São Paulo.

Three championships were contested for the 2023 season: Brazilian Championship, Overall and Special Edition. Despite only consisting of six out of the eight rounds held, the Brazilian Championship was recognized as its primary championship. The Brazilian Championship PRO division title won by the 2021 champions Júlio Campos and Léo Torres after Torres secured pole position in the points awarding Superpole session of the final round at Interlagos. The results from Qualifying also secured the PROAM division title for brothers Leonardo Reis and Rafael Reis, while a victory in his division on the penultimate race gave Henry Couto the AM championship title.

Léo Torres also clinched his first Overall title after winning the penultimate race, giving him an insurmountable amount of points to runner-up Vitor Genz. Guilherme Backes and Brendon Zonta was crowned as the Overall champions in the PROAM and AM divisions respectively. The Special Edition championship in the PRO, PROAM and AM divisions were respectively won by Vitor Genz and Rafael Dias, Guilherme Backes and Gabriel Casagrande, and rapper MC Gui.

== Teams and drivers ==
All entries in the series are operated by Sprint Race. Two drivers may share driving duties and collect points for the same entry. All cars used a 3.6 L (3,600 cc) V6 engine and the car models represented are used for aesthetic purposes only.

=== PRO ===
Body Style	No.	Race Driver	Rounds
Chevrolet Camaro	09	(Brazil) Arthur Gama	1–4, 7–8
Chevrolet Camaro	2	(Brazil) Guga Lima	1–2
Chevrolet Camaro	2	(Brazil) Marco Garcia	2
Chevrolet Camaro	3	(Brazil) Alex Seid	5–6
Chevrolet Camaro	11	(Brazil) Rafael Dias	1–4, 7–8 (Note: At Interlagos 2, Rafael Dias and Leandro Martins originally took part in the PRO division before they switched to the PROAM division after Superpole. The Superpole points that they scored for the PRO division were subsequently moved to their tally in the PROAM division.)
Chevrolet Camaro	11	(Portugal) Leandro Martins	8
Chevrolet Camaro	71	(Brazil) Valdeno Brito	6
Chevrolet Camaro	71	(Brazil) Nathan Brito	6
Chevrolet Camaro	88	(Brazil) Beto Monteiro	All
Chevrolet Camaro	88	(Brazil) Alex Seid	1–4, 7–8
Chevrolet Camaro	88	(Brazil) Kiko Porto	5
Chevrolet Camaro	88	(Brazil) Celso Neto	6
Ford Mustang	1	(Brazil) Léo Torres	All
Ford Mustang	1	(Brazil) Júlio Campos	1–4, 7–8
Ford Mustang	26	(Canada) Paul Tracy	6
Ford Mustang	27	(Brazil) Lucas Mendes	All
Ford Mustang	27	(Brazil) Rodrigo Sperafico	1–4, 7–8
Ford Mustang	46	(Brazil) Vitor Genz	All
Ford Mustang	46	(Brazil) Raphael Teixeira	1
Ford Mustang	46	(Brazil) Edgar Bueno Neto	2–4, 7–8
Ford Mustang	46	(Brazil) Rafael Dias	5–6
Ford Mustang	54	(Brazil) Diogo Moscato	All

=== PROAM ===
Body Style	No.	Race Driver	Rounds
Chevrolet Camaro	09	(Brazil) Arthur Gama	5–6
Chevrolet Camaro	09	(Brazil) Célio Vinicius	5
Chevrolet Camaro	09	(Brazil) Marcus Índio	6
Chevrolet Camaro	2	(Brazil) Marco Garcia	4
Chevrolet Camaro	4	(Brazil) Cayan Chianca	1–4, 7–8
Chevrolet Camaro	4	(Brazil) Pedro Bürger	1–4
Chevrolet Camaro	11	(Brazil) Rafael Dias	8
Chevrolet Camaro	11	(Portugal) Leandro Martins	8
Chevrolet Camaro	16	(Brazil) Antonio Junqueira	5–6, 8
Chevrolet Camaro	28	(Brazil) Guilherme Backes	1–4, 7–8
Chevrolet Camaro	43	(Brazil) Guilherme Backes	5–6
Chevrolet Camaro	43	(Brazil) Gabriel Casagrande	5–6
Chevrolet Camaro	57	(Brazil) Felipinho Tozzo	All
Chevrolet Camaro	57	(Brazil) João Bortoluzzi	All
Chevrolet Camaro	72	(Portugal) Lourenço Beirão	All
Chevrolet Camaro	72	(Brazil) Giovani Girotto	1–5
Chevrolet Camaro	72	(Brazil) Marco Garcia	6
Chevrolet Camaro	72	(Brazil) Jeff Giassi	7–8
Chevrolet Camaro	80	(Brazil) Rafael Seibel	1–4
Chevrolet Camaro	80	(Brazil) Vinny Azevedo	5
Chevrolet Camaro	80	(Brazil) Rodolpho Santos	5
Chevrolet Camaro	87	(Brazil) Jorge Martelli	All
Chevrolet Camaro	90	(Brazil) Erick Schotten	7
Ford Mustang	13	(Brazil) Witold Ramasauskas	5–8
Ford Mustang	32	(Brazil) Leonardo Reis	1–4, 7–8
Ford Mustang	32	(Brazil) Rafael Reis	1–4, 7–8
Ford Mustang	63	(Brazil) Luís Trombini	6, 8
Ford Mustang	63	(Brazil) Zezinho Muggiati	8
Ford Mustang	98	(Brazil) Luan Lopes	1

=== AM ===
Body Style	No.	Race Driver	Rounds
Chevrolet Camaro	12	(Brazil) Edson Reis	All
Chevrolet Camaro	31	(Brazil) Roberto Possas	1–4, 7–8
Chevrolet Camaro	78	(Brazil) Leonardo Yoshii	All
Ford Mustang	00	(Brazil) Henry Couto	1–4, 7–8
Ford Mustang	08	(Brazil) Alexandre Kauê	1–5, 7–8
Ford Mustang	08	(Brazil) Fabio Gubert	2–8
Ford Mustang	7	(Brazil) Brendon Zonta	All
Ford Mustang	7	(Brazil) Rômulo Molinari	1–4, 7–8
Ford Mustang	7	(Brazil) Dorivaldo Gondra Jr.	5–6
Ford Mustang	42	(Brazil) Fernando Nakamura	1–4
Ford Mustang	59	(Brazil) Cassiano Lopes	1–4, 7–8
Ford Mustang	59	(Brazil) Dorivaldo Gondra Jr.	1–4, 7–8
Ford Mustang	77	(Brazil) Pedro Bezerra	5–6
Ford Mustang	98	(Brazil) MC Gui	2–8

== Schedule ==
The provisional calendar for the 2023 season was announced on 12 January 2023. All races of the 2023 season will be held on road courses, with the exception of the fifth round at Goiânia where it uses the track's External Circuit oval layout instead.

Location of circuits scheduled to host a NASCAR Brasil Sprint Race round in 2023

Round		Track	Date
1	R1	(Goiás) Autódromo Internacional Ayrton Senna (Goiânia) (Mixed), Goiânia	19 March
1	R2	(Goiás) Autódromo Internacional Ayrton Senna (Goiânia) (Mixed), Goiânia	19 March
2	R3	(São Paulo (state)) Autódromo José Carlos Pace, São Paulo	30 April
2	R4	(São Paulo (state)) Autódromo José Carlos Pace, São Paulo	30 April
3	R5	(Paraná (state)) Autódromo Internacional Ayrton Senna (Londrina), Londrina	3 June
3	R6	(Paraná (state)) Autódromo Internacional Ayrton Senna (Londrina), Londrina	3 June
4	R7	(Paraná (state)) Autódromo Internacional de Cascavel, Cascavel	2 July
4	R8	(Paraná (state)) Autódromo Internacional de Cascavel, Cascavel	2 July
5	R9	(Goiás) Autódromo Internacional Ayrton Senna (Goiânia) (External), Goiânia	30 July
5	R10	(Goiás) Autódromo Internacional Ayrton Senna (Goiânia) (External), Goiânia	30 July
5	R11	(Goiás) Autódromo Internacional Ayrton Senna (Goiânia) (External), Goiânia	30 July
6	R12	(São Paulo (state)) Autódromo Velo Città, Mogi Guaçu	10 September
6	R13	(São Paulo (state)) Autódromo Velo Città, Mogi Guaçu	10 September
6	R14	(São Paulo (state)) Autódromo Velo Città, Mogi Guaçu	10 September
7	R15	(Rio Grande do Sul) Autódromo Internacional de Tarumã, Viamão	15 October
7	R16	(Rio Grande do Sul) Autódromo Internacional de Tarumã, Viamão	15 October
8	R17	(São Paulo (state)) Autódromo José Carlos Pace, São Paulo	10 December
8	R18	(São Paulo (state)) Autódromo José Carlos Pace, São Paulo	10 December

Brazilian championship round
Special Edition round

=== Calendar changes ===
- Autódromo Internacional de Santa Cruz do Sul, which hosted the 2022 season opening round, was removed from the schedule due to the venue undergoing renovations. Autódromo Internacional Ayrton Senna (Goiânia) will be hosting the season opening round in its place.
- Autódromo Internacional de Cascavel returned to the schedule after a single season of hiatus.
- On 7 June 2023, NASCAR Brasil Sprint Race announced that the second Autódromo José Carlos Pace round will now host the season finale on 10 December instead of the fifth round of the season. The schedule change was requested by the Municipality of São Paulo due to "the need to carry out a schedule of works" that needed to be done at Interlagos. The second round at Goiânia's Autódromo Internacional Ayrton Senna, which was initially scheduled to host the final round on 19 November, will now host the fifth round of the season on 30 July.

== Results ==
Bold indicates overall winner.

Round	Circuit	Pole position	Fastest lap	Most Laps Led	PRO winners	PROAM Winners	AM winners
1	(Goiás) Goiânia	(Brazil) Leonardo Reis	(Brazil) Luan Lopes	(Brazil) Leonardo Reis	(Brazil) **Arthur Gama**	(Brazil) Luan Lopes	(Brazil) Rômulo Molinari
2	(Goiás) Goiânia	(Portugal) Lourenço Beirão	(Brazil) Arthur Gama	(Brazil) Diogo Moscato	(Brazil) **Vitor Genz**	(Brazil) Rafael Reis	(Brazil) Leonardo Yoshii
3	(São Paulo (state)) Interlagos	(Brazil) Guilherme Backes	(Brazil) Arthur Gama	(Portugal) Lourenço Beirão	(Brazil) Léo Torres	**(Portugal) Lourenço Beirão**	(Brazil) Henry Couto
4	(São Paulo (state)) Interlagos	(Brazil) Beto Monteiro	(Brazil) Rafael Dias	(Brazil) Júlio Campos	**(Brazil) Júlio Campos**	(Brazil) Leonardo Reis	(Brazil) Henry Couto
5	(Paraná (state)) Londrina	(Brazil) Léo Torres	(Brazil) Jorge Martelli	(Brazil) Léo Torres	(Brazil) **Léo Torres**	(Brazil) Jorge Martelli	(Brazil) Henry Couto
6	(Paraná (state)) Londrina	(Brazil) Vitor Genz	(Brazil) Júlio Campos	(Brazil) Júlio Campos	(Brazil) **Júlio Campos**	(Brazil) Leonardo Reis	(Brazil) Henry Couto
7	(Paraná (state)) Cascavel	(Brazil) Vitor Genz (Note: Vitor Genz and Edgar Bueno Filho were the Cascavel superpole winners.) (Brazil) Edgard Bueno Neto	(Brazil) Leonardo Reis	(Brazil) Rafael Dias	(Brazil) **Rafael Dias**	(Brazil) Leonardo Reis	(Brazil) MC Gui
8	(Paraná (state)) Cascavel	(Brazil) Vitor Genz (Brazil) Edgard Bueno Neto	(Brazil) Rodrigo Sperafico	(Brazil) Rafael Dias	(Brazil) **Rafael Dias**	(Brazil) Rafael Reis	(Brazil) Leonardo Yoshii
9	(Goiás) Goiânia	(Brazil) Lucas Mendes (Note: Lucas Mendes was the Goiania superpole winner.)	(Brazil) Arthur Gama	(Brazil) Kiko Porto	(Brazil) **Kiko Porto**	(Brazil) Arthur Gama	(Brazil) MC Gui
10	(Goiás) Goiânia	(Brazil) Lucas Mendes	(Brazil) Alex Seid	(Brazil) Vitor Genz	(Brazil) **Vitor Genz**	(Brazil) João Bortoluzzi	(Brazil) Leonardo Yoshii
11	(Goiás) Goiânia	(Brazil) Lucas Mendes	(Brazil) Rafa Dias	(Brazil) Léo Torres	(Brazil) **Diogo Moscato**	(Brazil) Antonio Junqueira	(Brazil) Alexandre Kaue
12	(São Paulo (state)) Velo Città	(Brazil) Vitor Genz (Note: Vitor Genz was the Velo Città Superpole winner.)	(Canada) Paul Tracy	(Canada) Paul Tracy	(Canada) **Paul Tracy**	(Brazil) Jorge Martelli	(Brazil) MC Gui
13	(São Paulo (state)) Velo Città	(Brazil) Vitor Genz	(Brazil) Gabriel Casagrande	(Brazil) Rafael Dias	(Brazil) Rafael Dias	(Brazil) **Gabriel Casagrande**	(Brazil) Edson Reis
14	(São Paulo (state)) Velo Città	(Brazil) Vitor Genz	(Brazil) Vitor Genz	(Brazil) Gabriel Casagrande	(Brazil) Vitor Genz	(Brazil) **Gabriel Casagrande**	(Brazil) Brendon Zonta
15	(Rio Grande do Sul) Tarumã	(Brazil) Arthur Gama	(Brazil) Arthur Gama	(Brazil) Arthur Gama	(Brazil) **Arthur Gama**	(Brazil) Cayan Chianca	(Brazil) Henry Couto
16	(Rio Grande do Sul) Tarumã	(Brazil) Júlio Campos	(Brazil) Júlio Campos	(Brazil) Vitor Genz	(Brazil) **Júlio Campos**	(Brazil) Cayan Chianca	(Brazil) MC Gui
17	(São Paulo (state)) Interlagos	(Brazil) Léo Torres (Note: Léo Torres was the Interlagos Superpole winner.)	(Brazil) Arthur Gama	(Brazil) Léo Torres	(Brazil) **Léo Torres**	(Brazil) Witold Ramasaukas	(Brazil) Henry Couto
18	(São Paulo (state)) Interlagos	(Brazil) Léo Torres	(Brazil) Leonardo Reis	(Brazil) Júlio Campos	(Brazil) **Júlio Campos**	(Brazil) Witold Ramasaukas	(Brazil) Henry Couto

== Standings ==
=== Overall ===
Points are awarded to the driver's entry. While the drivers from all classes would compete at the same time, they would only score points on their respective classes, nonetheless the exception is the special edition race 1 and 2 that scored based on the final result not taking into account the class position. If an entrant entered two drivers, then both drivers would earn points for their entry. Drivers must complete at least 75% of the race in order to be classified for points. Drivers are allowed to discard points from one Special Edition score and one Brazilian championship score towards their final tally in the overall standings.

Brazilian championship points

Races	Position, points per race											
Races	1st	2nd	3rd	4th	5th	6th	7th	8th	9th	10th	11th	12th
Races & Superpole	25	20	16	14	12	10	8	6	4	3	2	1

Special edition points

Races	Position, points per race																	
Races	1st	2nd	3rd	4th	5th	6th	7th	8th	9th	10th	11th	12th	13th	14th	15th	16th	17th	18th
Race 1 & Race 2	18	17	16	15	14	13	12	11	10	9	8	7	6	5	4	3	2	1
Race 3 & Superpole	25	20	16	14	12	10	8	6	4	3	2	1	0					

(key) Bold - Pole position awarded by fastest qualifying time. Italics - Fastest lap. * – Most laps led. ^{S} - Driver who started the race, if they were part of a two-driver entry. 1 2 3 4 5 6 7 8 9 10 11 12 - Superpole position. † – Drivers did not finish the race, but were classified as they completed more than 75% of the race distance.

Pos	Driver	(Goiás) GOI1		(São Paulo (state)) INT1		(Paraná (state)) LON		(Paraná (state)) CAS		(Goiás) GOI2			(São Paulo (state)) VEL			(Rio Grande do Sul) TAR		(São Paulo (state)) INT2		Dis.	Points
Pos	Driver	PRO																			
1	(Brazil) Léo Torres	Ret^{S}	19	2^{S}	1	**1***^{S}	1	3^{3}	3^{S}	2^{2}	10	13*	Ret^{2}	4	6	3^{S}	1	**1***^{1}^{S}	1	0	390
2	(Brazil) Vitor Genz	20	1^{S}	9^{S}	8	8	**2** ^{S}	**6**^{1}^{S}	15	Ret^{4}^{S}	1*^{S}	3	Ret^{1}	2	2 ^{S}	17	6*^{S}	10^{6}	8^{S}	0	311
3	(Brazil) Alex Seid	8^{S}	4	3^{S}	2	7^{S}	4	4^{3}	20^{S}	7^{5}	11	15	3^{7}	8	3	7^{S}	7	7^{2}^{S}	12	20	293
4	(Brazil) Diogo Moscato	4	2*	Ret	DNS	3	8	7^{7}	4	4^{6}	2	1	4^{5}	3	12	19	10	4^{5}	4	10	281
5	(Brazil) Júlio Campos	Ret	19^{S}	2	1*^{S}	1	1*^{S}	3^{3}^{S}	3							3	1 ^{S}	1^{1}	1*^{S}	0	280
6	(Brazil) Beto Monteiro	8	4^{S}	3	**2**^{S}	7	4^{S}	4^{3}^{S}	20	1^{3}	DQ	Ret^{S}	Ret^{6}	11	7^{S}	7	7^{S}	7^{2}	12^{S}	12	264
7	(Brazil) Rafael Dias	5	14	5	4	DNS	19	1^{3}*	1*	Ret^{4}	1	3 ^{S}	Ret^{1}^{S}	2^{S}	2	DQ	11	PO	PO	0	259
8	(Brazil) Lucas Mendes	DQ^{S}	6	6	3^{S}	4	7^{S}	Ret^{6}^{S}	2	**3**^{1}	15	4	Ret^{4}	7	Ret	5^{S}	Ret	21^{4}	15^{S}	0	233
9	(Brazil) Arthur Gama	1	20	4	5	Ret	Ret	2^{5}	Ret							**1***	2	3^{3}	3	0	192
10	(Brazil) Edgar Bueno Neto			9	8^{S}	8^{S}	2	**6**^{1}	15^{S}							17^{S}	6	10^{6}^{S}	8	0	153
11	(Brazil) Rodrigo Sperafico	DQ	6^{S}	6^{S}	3	4^{S}	7	Ret^{6}	2 ^{S}							5	Ret^{S}	21^{4}^{S}	15	0	146
12	(Brazil) Valdeno Brito												Ret^{3}	10	4^{S}					0	41
12	(Brazil) Nathan Brito												Ret^{3}^{S}	10^{S}	4					0	41
13	(Brazil) Guga Lima	7	3	14	Ret^{S}															0	39
14	(Brazil) Raphael Teixeira	20^{S}	1																	0	35
15	(Brazil) Kiko Porto									1*^{3}^{S}	DQ^{S}	Ret								0	34
16	(Brazil) Celso Neto												Ret^{6}^{S}	11^{S}	7					0	30
17	(Brazil) Marco Garcia			14^{S}	Ret															0	8
PROAM
1	(Brazil) Guilherme Backes	Ret	8	**15**	15	5	6	14^{7}	8	9^{1}^{S}	Ret	Ret	6^{1}^{S}	1	1	7	17	5^{8}	6	0	293
2	(Portugal) Lourenço Beirão	10	**17**^{S}	1*^{S}	12	13	Ret^{S}	6^{2}^{S}	13	10^{2}^{S}	Ret	9	10^{4}	Ret^{S}	9^{S}	5^{S}	5	6^{6}^{S}	5	0	278
3	(Brazil) Leonardo Reis	**3***^{S}	5	8	6^{S}	6	3^{S}	5^{1}^{S}	5							15	4^{S}	DNS^{2}	23 ^{S}	12	246
3	(Brazil) Rafael Reis	3	5^{S}	8^{S}	6	6^{S}	3	5^{1}	5^{S}							15^{S}	4	DNS^{2}^{S}	23^{S}	12	246
4	(Brazil) Felipinho Tozzo	17^{S}	11	13^{S}	11	9	Ret^{S}	8^{5}	7^{S}	12^{2}^{S}	3	5	14^{6}^{S}	9	Ret	17^{S}	16	17	17^{S}	0	233
4	(Brazil) João Bortoluzzi	17	11^{S}	13	11^{S}	9^{S}	Ret	8^{5}^{S}	7	12^{2}	3^{S}	5^{S}	14^{6}	9^{S}	Ret^{S}	17	16^{S}	17^{S}	17	0	233
5	(Brazil) Witold Ramasauskas									8^{3}	7	6	5^{2}	16	8	9	8	2^{3}	2	3	200
6	(Brazil) Jorge Martelli	19	10	Ret	DNS	2	5	15^{3}	6	Ret^{4}	DNS	DNS	2^{3}	DNS	Ret	Ret	Ret	22^{4}	7	0	195
7	(Brazil) Cayan Chianca	6	Ret^{S}	7^{S}	7	Ret	9^{S}	Ret^{6}^{S}	19							2	3	15^{5}	9	0	172
8	(Brazil) Giovani Girotto	10^{S}	17	1	12^{S}	13^{S}	Ret	6^{2}	13^{S}	10^{2}	Ret^{S}	9^{S}								0	158
9	(Brazil) Antonio Junqueira									Ret^{5}	4	2	7^{7}	6	6			5^{10}	22	0	126
10	(Brazil) Gabriel Casagrande									9^{1}	Ret^{S}	Ret^{S}	6^{1}	1 ^{S}	1^{S}					0	117
11	(Brazil) Pedro Bürger	6^{S}	Ret	7	7^{S}	Ret^{S}	9	Ret^{6}	19^{S}											0	88
12	(Brazil) Rafael Seibel	9	18	11	Ret	11	Ret	12^{7}	12											0	88
13	(Brazil) Jeff Giassi															5	5^{S}	6^{6}	5^{S}	0	82
14	(Brazil) Arthur Gama									5*^{8}^{S}	8	8^{S}	13^{5}	5^{S}	10^{S}					6	80
15	(Brazil) Marco Garcia							Ret^{8}	21				10^{4}^{S}	Ret	9					0	50
16	(Brazil) Luís Trombini												15^{8}	Ret	Ret			Ret^{1}	15^{S}	0	46
17	(Brazil) Luan Lopes	2	7																	0	45
18	(Brazil) Célio Vinicius									5^{8}	8^{S}	8								0	41
19	(Brazil) Zezinho Mugiiatti																	Ret^{1}^{S}	15	0	35
20	(Brazil) Marcus Índio												13^{5}	5^{S}	10^{S}					0	31
21	(Brazil) Vinny Azevedo									11^{7}	5	DQ^{S}								0	30
21	(Brazil) Rodolpho Santos									11^{7}^{S}	5^{S}	DQ								0	30
22	(Brazil) Rafael Dias																	9^{7}^{S}	Ret	0	22
22	(Portugal) Leandro Martins																	9^{7}^{S}	Ret	0	22
23	(Brazil) Erick Schotten															21	Ret			0	8
AM
1	(Brazil) Brendon Zonta	11	15^{S}	16^{S}	13	14	12^{S}	Ret^{9}	11^{S}	15^{1}	Ret	Ret^{S}	9^{1}^{S}	Ret	11^{S}	12^{S}	11	13^{1}^{S}	19	0	302
2	(Brazil) Henry Couto	12	Ret	10	9	10	10	13^{4}	10							9	12	8^{3}	10	0	281
3	(Brazil) Edson Reis	15	16	12	10	12	15	18^{7}	16	16^{2}	9	11	11^{3}	12	14	14	Ret	18^{2}	13	3	273
4	(Brazil) MC Gui			Ret	DNS	Ret	13	10^{1}	17	6^{4}	12	12	8^{2}	14	13	11	9	14^{7}	14	5	252
5	(Brazil) Léonardo Yoshii	18	9	DNS	DNS	17	11	11^{2}	9	Ret^{3}	6	14	12^{4}	Ret	DNS	13	DQ	16^{4}	12	0	251
6	(Brazil) Fabio Gubert			17	18^{S}	19^{S}	14	17^{5}^{S}	14	14^{5}^{S}	13^{S}	7	17^{6}	15	15	18^{S}	14	12^{5}	20^{S}	3	216
7	(Brazil) Alexandre Kauê	14	13	17^{S}	18	19	14^{S}	17^{5}	14^{S}	14^{5}	13	7^{S}				18	14^{S}	12^{5}^{S}	20	0	212
8	(Brazil) Rômulo Molinari	11^{S}	15	16	13^{S}	14^{S}	12	Ret^{9}^{S}	11							12	11^{S}	13^{1}	19^{S}	0	212
9	(Brazil) Dorivaldo Gondra Jr.	16	21^{S}	19^{S}	14	15	18^{S}	19^{3}	DNS^{S}	15^{1}^{S}	Ret^{S}	Ret	9^{1}	Ret^{S}	11	Ret^{S}	Ret	19^{6}	18^{S}	0	208
10	(Brazil) Cassiano Lopes	16^{S}	21	19	14^{S}	15^{S}	18	19^{3}^{S}	DNS							Ret	Ret^{S}	19^{6}^{S}	18	0	118
11	(Brazil) Roberto Possas	Ret	DNS	18	17	16	16	DQ^{6}	DNS							16	15	20^{8}	21	0	92
12	(Brazil) Fernando Nakamura	13	12	Ret	16	18	17	16^{8}	18											0	90
13	(Brazil) Pedro Bezerra									13^{6}	14	10	16^{5}	13	Ret					0	63
Guest drivers ineligible for championship points
	(Canada) Paul Tracy												1	DQ	16					-	

=== Brazilian Championship ===
Each drivers' worst score is dropped.

Pos	Driver	(Goiás) GOI		(São Paulo (state)) INT1		(Paraná (state)) LON		(Paraná (state)) CAS		(Rio Grande do Sul) TAR	(São Paulo (state)) INT2	Points
PRO
1	(Brazil) Léo Torres	Ret^{S}	19	2^{S}	1	**1***^{S}	1	3^{3}	3^{S}			160
1	(Brazil) Júlio Campos	Ret	19^{S}	2	1*^{S}	1	1*^{S}	3^{3}^{S}	3			160
2	(Brazil) Vitor Genz	20	1^{S}	9^{S}	8	8	**2** ^{S}	**6**^{1}^{S}	15			138
3	(Brazil) Alex Seid	8^{S}	4	3^{S}	2	7^{S}	4	4^{3}	20^{S}			126
3	(Brazil) Beto Monteiro	8	4^{S}	3	**2**^{S}	7	4^{S}	4^{3}^{S}	20			126
4	(Brazil) Rafael Dias	5	14	5	4	DNS	19	1^{3}*	1*			130
5	(Brazil) Diogo Moscato	4	2*	Ret<	DNS	3	8	7^{7}	4			104
6	(Brazil) Edgar Bueno Neto			9	8^{S}	8^{S}	2	**6**^{1}	15^{S}			103
7	(Brazil) Lucas Mendes	DQ^{S}	6	6	3^{S}	4	7^{S}	Ret^{6}^{S}	2			96
7	(Brazil) Rodrigo Sperafico	DQ	6^{S}	6^{S}	3	4^{S}	7	Ret^{6}	2 ^{S}			96
8	(Brazil) Arthur Gama	1	20	4	5	Ret	Ret	2^{5}	Ret			91
9	(Brazil) Guga Lima	7	3	14	Ret^{S}							39
10	(Brazil) Raphael Teixeira	20^{S}	1									35
11	(Brazil) Marco Garcia			14^{S}	Ret							8
PROAM
1	(Brazil) Leonardo Reis	**3***^{S}	5	8	6^{S}	6	3^{S}	5^{1}^{S}	5			202
1	(Brazil) Rafael Reis	3	5^{S}	8^{S}	6	6^{S}	3	5^{1}	5^{S}			202
2	(Brazil) Giovani Girotto	10^{S}	17	1	12^{S}	13^{S}	Ret	6^{2}	13^{S}			117
2	(Portugal) Lourenço Beirão	10	**17**^{S}	1*^{S}	12	13	Ret^{S}	6^{2}^{S}	13			117
3	(Brazil) Jorge Martelli	19	10	Ret	DNS	2	5	15^{3}	6			113
4	(Brazil) Felipinho Tozzo	17^{S}	11	13^{S}	11	9	Ret^{S}	8^{5}	7^{S}			112
4	(Brazil) João Bortoluzzi	17	11^{S}	13	11^{S}	9^{S}	Ret	8^{5}^{S}	7			112
5	(Brazil) Guilherme Backes	Ret	8	**15**	15	5	6	14^{7}	8			108
6	(Brazil) Pedro Bürger	6^{S}	Ret	7	7^{S}	Ret^{S}	9	Ret^{6}	19^{S}			88
6	(Brazil) Cayan Chianca	6	Ret^{S}	7^{S}	7	Ret	9^{S}	Ret^{6}^{S}	19			88
7	(Brazil) Rafael Seibel	9	18	11	Ret	11	Ret	12^{7}	12			48
8	(Brazil) Luan Lopes	2	7									45
9	(Brazil) Marco Garcia							Ret^{8}	21			12
AM
1	(Brazil) Henry Couto	12	Ret	10	9	10	10	13^{4}	10			170
2	(Brazil) Léonardo Yoshii	18	9	DNS	DNS	17	11	11^{2}	9			128
3	(Brazil) Edson Reis	15	16	12	10	12	15	18^{7}	16			124
4	(Brazil) Rômulo Molinari	11^{S}	15	16	13^{S}	14^{S}	12	Ret^{9}^{S}	11			123
4	(Brazil) Brendon Zonta	11	15^{S}	16^{S}	13	14	12^{S}	Ret^{9}	11^{S}			123
5	(Brazil) Alexandre Kauê	14	13	17^{S}	18	19	14^{S}	17^{5}	14^{S}			108
6	(Brazil) Fernando Nakamura	13	12	Ret	16	18	17	16^{8}	18			90
7	(Brazil) Cassiano Lopes	16^{S}	21	19	14^{S}	15^{S}	18	19^{3}^{S}	DNS			86
7	(Brazil) Dorivaldo Gondra Jr.	16	21^{S}	19^{S}	14	15	18^{S}	19^{3}	DNS^{S}			86
8	(Brazil) Fabio Gubert			17	18^{S}	19^{S}	14	17^{5}^{S}	14			78
9	(Brazil) MC Gui			Ret	DNS	Ret	13	10^{1}	17			74
10	(Brazil) Roberto Possas	Ret	DNS	18	17	16	16	DQ^{6}	DNS			52

=== Special Edition ===
Each drivers' worst score is dropped.

Pos	Driver	(Goiás) GOI	(São Paulo (state)) VEL	Points
PRO
PROAM
AM

== See also ==
- 2023 NASCAR Cup Series
- 2023 NASCAR Xfinity Series
- 2023 NASCAR Craftsman Truck Series
- 2023 ARCA Menards Series
- 2023 ARCA Menards Series East
- 2023 ARCA Menards Series West
- 2023 NASCAR Whelen Modified Tour
- 2023 NASCAR Pinty's Series
- 2023 NASCAR Mexico Series
- 2023 NASCAR Whelen Euro Series
- 2023 SRX Series
- 2023 CARS Tour
- 2023 SMART Modified Tour
