= 2022 TCR South America Touring Car Championship =

Motor racing competition

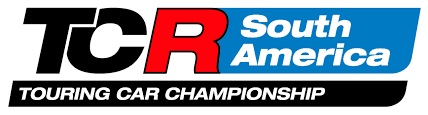
Official Logo

The 2022 TCR South America Touring Car Championship was the second season of TCR South America Touring Car Championship.

== Calendar ==
The championship is to begin in January 2022, with a maximum of 40 entries, eight rounds consisting of sixteen 35-minute races would be run in Argentina, Brazil and Uruguay.

Race is an Endurance Event

Rnd.	Circuit/Location	Date
1	(Brazil) Autódromo Velo Città, Mogi Guaçu	2–3 April
2	(Brazil) Autódromo José Carlos Pace, São Paulo	30 April–1 May
3	(Brazil) Autódromo Internacional Ayrton Senna, Goiânia	4–5 June
4	(Uruguay) Autódromo Eduardo Prudêncio Cabrera, Rivera	16–17 July
5	(Uruguay) Autódromo Víctor Borrat Fabini, El Pinar	6–7 August
6	(Argentina) Autódromo Termas de Río Hondo, Termas de Río Hondo	27–28 August
7	(Argentina) Autódromo Oscar y Juan Gálvez, Buenos Aires	17–18 September
8	(Argentina) Circuito San Juan Villicum, Albardón	8–9 October

== Teams and drivers ==
Team	Car	No.	Drivers	Class	Rounds	Co-Driver name	Rounds
(Brazil) Cobra Racing Team	Audi RS3 LMS TCR (2017)	03	(Brazil) Bia Figueiredo		1–4	(Brazil) Antonella Bassani	2
(Brazil) Cobra Racing Team	Audi RS3 LMS TCR (2017)	10	(Brazil) Adalberto Baptista	T	1–6	(Brazil) Sergio Ramalho	2, 6
(Brazil) Cobra Racing Team	Audi RS3 LMS TCR (2017)	22	(Switzerland) Gabriel Lusquiños		6–8	(Brazil) Vitor Genz	6
(Brazil) Cobra Racing Team	Audi RS3 LMS TCR (2017)	29	(Argentina) Ignacio Montenegro		7	—N/a	
(Brazil) Cobra Racing Team	Audi RS3 LMS TCR (2017)	37	(Brazil) Guilherme Reischl	T	1–3	(Brazil) Marcio Basso	2
(Argentina) PMO Racing	Peugeot 308 TCR	4	(Argentina) Figgo Bessone		8	—N/a	
(Argentina) PMO Racing	Peugeot 308 TCR	13	(Argentina) Pablo Otero	T	1	—N/a	
(Argentina) PMO Racing	Peugeot 308 TCR	15	(Uruguay) Enrique Maglione	T	2–8	(Uruguay) Fernando Rama	2
(Argentina) PMO Racing	Peugeot 308 TCR	15	(Uruguay) Enrique Maglione	T	2–8	(Uruguay) Rodrigo Aramendia	6
(Argentina) PMO Racing	Peugeot 308 TCR	24	(Uruguay) Frederick Balbi		3	—N/a	
(Argentina) PMO Racing	Peugeot 308 TCR	37	(Brazil) Guilherme Reischl	T	4	—N/a	
(Argentina) PMO Racing	Peugeot 308 TCR	60	(Uruguay) Juan Manuel Casella		2–8	(Uruguay) Frederick Balbi	2, 6
(Argentina) PMO Racing	Peugeot 308 TCR	87	(Argentina) Franco Farina		All	(Argentina) Gaston Iansa	2
(Argentina) PMO Racing	Peugeot 308 TCR	87	(Argentina) Franco Farina		All	(Brazil) Guilherme Reischl	6
(Argentina) PMO Racing	Peugeot 308 TCR	100	(Argentina) Juan Pablo Bessone		2	(Argentina) Carlos Okulovich	2
(Argentina) PMO Motorsport	Lynk & Co 03 TCR	5	(Brazil) Marcio Basso	T	3–4, 6, 8	(Brazil) Pedro Nunes	6
(Argentina) PMO Motorsport	Lynk & Co 03 TCR	7	(Argentina) Fabricio Pezzini		All	(Argentina) Carlos Merlo	2
(Argentina) PMO Motorsport	Lynk & Co 03 TCR	7	(Argentina) Fabricio Pezzini		All	(Argentina) Carlos Okulovich	6
(Argentina) PMO Motorsport	Lynk & Co 03 TCR	33	(Argentina) José Manuel Sapag		All	(Argentina) Marcelo Ciarrocchi	2
(Argentina) PMO Motorsport	Lynk & Co 03 TCR	33	(Argentina) José Manuel Sapag		All	(Uruguay) Santiago Urrutia	6
(Argentina) PMO Motorsport	Lynk & Co 03 TCR	96	(Uruguay) Santiago Urrutia		7	—N/a	
Squadra Matino Uruguay	Alfa Romeo Giulietta TCR	8	(Argentina) Matias Milla		8	—N/a	
Squadra Matino Uruguay	Alfa Romeo Giulietta TCR	14	(Argentina) Matías Cravero		6	(Argentina) Martín Chialvo	6
Squadra Matino Uruguay	Alfa Romeo Giulietta TCR	24	(Uruguay) Frederick Balbi		8	—N/a	
Squadra Matino Uruguay	Alfa Romeo Giulietta TCR	27	(Uruguay) Rodrigo Aramendia		5	—N/a	
Squadra Matino Uruguay	Alfa Romeo Giulietta TCR	73	(Argentina) Juan Pablo Bessone		6	(Argentina) Isidoro Vezzaro	6
Squadra Matino Uruguay	Alfa Romeo Giulietta TCR	81	(Uruguay) Fernando Rama		5	—N/a	
(Argentina) Squadra Martino	Honda Civic Type R TCR (FK8)	11	(Argentina) Roy Block	T	7	—N/a	
(Argentina) Squadra Martino	Honda Civic Type R TCR (FK8)	14	(Argentina) Matias Cravero		8	—N/a	
(Argentina) Squadra Martino	Honda Civic Type R TCR (FK8)	26	(Argentina) Juan Ángel Rosso		All	(Argentina) Ricardo Risatti	2, 6
(Argentina) Squadra Martino	Honda Civic Type R TCR (FK8)	34	(Brazil) Fabio Casagrande	T	All	(Uruguay) Mauricio Lambiris	2
(Argentina) Squadra Martino	Honda Civic Type R TCR (FK8)	34	(Brazil) Fabio Casagrande	T	All	(Argentina) Esteban Guerrieri	6
(Argentina) Squadra Martino	Honda Civic Type R TCR (FK8)	112	(Argentina) Mariano Beraldi	T	5	—N/a	
(Argentina) Squadra Martino	Honda Civic Type R TCR (FK2)	88	(Argentina) Facundo Márques		6	(Argentina) Franco Coscia	6
(Argentina) Squadra Martino	Honda Civic Type R TCR (FK2)	95	(Argentina) Javier Manta	T	2	(Argentina) Gonzalo Fernandez	2
(Brazil) Scuderia Chiarelli	Hyundai Elantra N TCR	12	(Brazil) Edson Reis	T	2–4	(Brazil) Felipe Papazissis	2
(Brazil) Scuderia Chiarelli	Hyundai Elantra N TCR	35	(Brazil) Pedro Aizza		1–7	(Brazil) Rodrigo Sperafico	2
(Brazil) Scuderia Chiarelli	Hyundai Elantra N TCR	35	(Brazil) Pedro Aizza		1–7	(Spain) Mikel Azcona	6
(Brazil) Scuderia Chiarelli	Hyundai Elantra N TCR	85	(Argentina) Walter Hernández		8	—N/a	
(Brazil) Crown Racing	Honda Civic Type R TCR (FK8)	13	(Argentina) Pablo Otero	T	6	(Brazil) Bia Figueiredo	6
(Brazil) Crown Racing	Honda Civic Type R TCR (FK8)	22	(Brazil) Gabriel Lusquiños		1–4	(Brazil) Vitor Genz	2
(Brazil) Crown Racing	Honda Civic Type R TCR (FK8)	29	(Argentina) Ignacio Montenegro		6	(Argentina) Néstor Girolami	6
(Brazil) Crown Racing	Honda Civic Type R TCR (FK8)	44	(Brazil) Alessandro Marchini	T	1	—N/a	
(Brazil) Crown Racing	Honda Civic Type R TCR (FK8)	55	(Brazil) Renato Braga	T	2–3	(Brazil) Pablo Alves	2
(Brazil) W2 ProGP	CUPRA León Competición TCR	17	(Brazil) Alceu Feldmann		2–7	(Brazil) Andre Bragantini Jr.	2
(Brazil) W2 ProGP	CUPRA León Competición TCR	17	(Brazil) Alceu Feldmann		2–7	(Argentina) Matías Milla	6
(Brazil) W2 ProGP	CUPRA León Competición TCR	61	(Argentina) Bernardo Llaver		8	—N/a	
(Brazil) W2 ProGP	CUPRA León Competición TCR	71	(Brazil) Antonio Junqueira	T	1	—N/a	
(Brazil) W2 ProGP	CUPRA León Competición TCR	77	(Brazil) Raphael Reis		All	(Brazil) Guga Lima	2
(Brazil) W2 ProGP	CUPRA León Competición TCR	77	(Brazil) Raphael Reis		All	(Argentina) Bernardo Llaver	6
(Argentina) FDC	Hyundai i30 N TCR	18	(Chile) Javier Scuncio		6, 8	(Chile) Martín Scuncio	6
(Brazil) PropCar Racing Team	Alfa Romeo Giulietta TCR	27	(Uruguay) Rodrigo Aramendia		4	—N/a	
(Brazil) PropCar Racing Team	Alfa Romeo Giulietta TCR	31	(Brazil) Roberto Possas	T	3	—N/a	
(Brazil) PropCar Racing Team	Alfa Romeo Giulietta TCR	84	(Brazil) Fernando Croce	T	1	—N/a	
(Brazil) PropCar Racing Team	Alfa Romeo Giulietta TCR	97	(Uruguay) Hernán Giuria	T	4	—N/a	
(Brazil) PropCar Racing Team	Alfa Romeo Giulietta TCR	373	(Brazil) Raphael Teixeira		2	(Brazil) Roberto Possas	2
(Argentina) Milanese Sport	Honda Civic Type R TCR (FK8)	85	(Argentina) Walter Hernández		7	—N/a	
(Argentina) Toyota Gazoo Racing Latin America	Toyota GR Corolla Sport TCR	32	(Argentina) Jorge Barrio		6–8	(Brazil) Thiago Camilo	6

Icon	Class
T	Trophy

== Results and standings ==
=== Season summary ===
Rnd.		Circuit	Pole position	Fastest lap	Winning driver	Winning team	Winning Trophy driver
1	R1	(Brazil) Velo Città	(Brazil) Raphael Reis	(Brazil) Raphael Reis	(Brazil) Raphael Reis	(Brazil) W2 ProGP	(Brazil) Antonio Junqueira
1	R2	(Brazil) Velo Città		(Argentina) Fabricio Pezzini	(Argentina) Fabricio Pezzini	(Argentina) PMO Motorsport	(Brazil) Adalberto Baptista
2	R3	(Brazil) Interlagos	(Brazil) Raphael Reis (Brazil) Guga Lima	(Brazil) Pedro Aizza (Brazil) Rodrigo Sperafico	(Argentina) Fabricio Pezzini (Argentina) Carlos Merlo	(Argentina) PMO Motorsport	(Uruguay) Enrique Maglione (Uruguay) Fernando Rama
3	R4	(Brazil) Goiânia	(Brazil) Alceu Feldmann	(Brazil) Alceu Feldmann	(Brazil) Alceu Feldmann	(Brazil) W2 ProGP	(Brazil) Márcio Basso
3	R5	(Brazil) Goiânia		(Brazil) Alceu Feldmann	(Brazil) Alceu Feldmann	(Brazil) W2 ProGP	(Brazil) Renato Braga
4	R6	(Uruguay) Rivera	(Argentina) Juan Ángel Rosso	(Argentina) Juan Ángel Rosso	(Argentina) Juan Ángel Rosso	(Argentina) Squadra Martino	(Brazil) Edson dos Reis
4	R7	(Uruguay) Rivera		(Argentina) Juan Ángel Rosso	(Argentina) Juan Ángel Rosso	(Argentina) Squadra Martino	(Brazil) Fabio Casagrande
5	R8	(Uruguay) El Pinar	(Argentina) Juan Ángel Rosso	(Argentina) José Manuel Sapag	(Argentina) Juan Ángel Rosso	(Argentina) Squadra Martino	(Uruguay) Enrique Maglione
5	R9	(Uruguay) El Pinar		(Brazil) Raphael Reis	(Argentina) José Manuel Sapag	(Argentina) PMO Motorsport	(Uruguay) Enrique Maglione
6	R10	(Argentina) Termas de Río Hondo	(Argentina) José Manuel Sapag (Uruguay) Santiago Urrutia	(Brazil) Pedro Aizza (Spain) Mikel Azcona	(Brazil) Fabio Casagrande (Argentina) Esteban Guerrieri	(Argentina) Squadra Martino	(Brazil) Fabio Casagrande (Argentina) Esteban Guerrieri
7	R11	(Argentina) Buenos Aires	(Argentina) Jorge Barrio	(Argentina) Jorge Barrio	(Argentina) Jorge Barrio	(Argentina) Toyota Gazoo Racing Latin America	(Brazil) Fabio Casagrande
7	R12	(Argentina) Buenos Aires		(Brazil) Raphael Reis	(Brazil) Raphael Reis	(Brazil) W2 ProGP	(Brazil) Fabio Casagrande
8	R13	(Argentina) San Juan Villicum	(Argentina) Fabricio Pezzini	(Argentina) Juan Angel Rosso	(Argentina) Jorge Barrio	(Argentina) Toyota Gazoo Racing Latin America	(Brazil) Marcio Basso
8	R14	(Argentina) San Juan Villicum		(Argentina) Jorge Barrio	(Argentina) Juan Ángel Rosso	(Argentina) Squadra Martino	(Uruguay) Enrique Maglione

=== Scoring system ===
Position	**1st**	**2nd**	**3rd**	**4th**	**5th**	**6th**	**7th**	**8th**	**9th**	**10th**	**11th**	**12th**	**13th**	**14th**	**15th**
Qualifying 1	6	5	4	3	2	1	—N/a								
Qualifying 2	10	7	5	4	3	—N/a									
Feature races	40	35	30	27	24	21	18	15	13	11	9	7	5	3	1
Sprint races	35	30	27	24	21	18	15	13	11	9	7	5	3	2	1
Endurance races	70	60	54	48	42	36	30	26	22	18	14	10	6	3	1

=== Drivers' championship ===
Pos.	Driver	GYN (Brazil)		INT (Brazil)	GYN (Brazil)		RIV (Uruguay)		ELP (Uruguay)		TRH (Argentina)	BUE (Argentina)		SJV (Argentina)		Pts.
Pos.	Driver	RD1	RD2	RDU	RD1	RD2	RD1	RD2	RD1	RD2	RDU	RD1	RD2	RD1	RD2	Pts.
1	(Argentina) Fabricio Pezzini	2^{4}	1	1	2^{4}	3	4^{4}	2	5	3	3	4^{5}	3	**4**^{1}	Ret	486 (510)
2	(Argentina) Juan Ángel Rosso	3^{2}	Ret	3	7^{2}	5	**1**^{1}	1	**1**^{1}	10	11	2^{1}	9	5	1	460
3	(Brazil) Raphael Reis	**1**^{1}	3	**5**	3^{3}	6	2^{2}	9	4^{2}	7	14†	10	1	2^{2}	4	432 (443)
4	(Argentina) José Manuel Sapag	6	2	4	4^{5}	4	5	7	3	1	**9**	5^{3}	Ret	WD	WD	346
5	(Brazil) Pedro Aizza	7^{5}	10	2	10	10	3	3	Ret	2	2	8	7			309
6	(Uruguay) Juan Manuel Casella			10	5	2	6	10	7^{3}	11	4	7^{4}	10	13	5	251
7	(Brazil) Fabio Casagrande	Ret	8	15†	11	12	10	6	10	9	1	6	8	11	12	218
8	(Argentina) Franco Farina	10	5	7	12	8	Ret	Ret	8^{4}	5	8	13	4	Ret^{5}	10	196
9	(Brazil) Alceu Feldmann			Ret	**1**^{1}	1	12†^{3}	4	6	4	DSQ	DNS	DNS			181
10	(Switzerland) Gabriel Lusquiños	5	4	6	15	16	Ret	Ret			7	11	2	9	11	180
11	(Uruguay) Enrique Maglione			8	17†	15	Ret	12	2^{5}	8	5	9	12†	14	9	165
12	(Uruguay) Frederick Balbi			10	6	11					4			15	Ret	97
13	(Argentina) Ricardo Risatti III			3							11					85
14	(Uruguay) Rodrigo Aramendía						7^{5}	5	Ret	Ret	5					84
15	(Argentina) Bernardo Llaver										14†			3^{3}	2	83
16	(Brazil) Marcio Basso			11	9	13	Ret	DNS			6					81
17	(Brazil) Bia Figueiredo	9	12	14	8	7	8	8			Ret					79
18	(Argentina) Carlos Merlo			1												78
19	(Argentina) Esteban Guerrieri										1					76
20	(Uruguay) Santiago Urrutia										**9**	3^{2}	Ret			76
21	(Brazil) Guilherme Reischl	11	7	11	DNS	DNS	11	DNS			8					73
22	(Brazil) Vitor Genz			6							7					66
23	(Argentina) Carlos Okulovich			Ret							3					64
24	(Brazil) Rodrigo Sperafico			2												63
25	(Brazil) Adalberto Baptista	13	6	13	13	14	DSQ	DNS	11	Ret	10					63
26	(Spain) Mikel Azcona										2					62
27	(Brazil) Guga Lima			**5**												58
28	(Uruguay) Fernando Rama			8					9	6						57
29	(Argentina) Marcelo Ciarrocchi			4												56
30	(Argentina) Matías Milla										DSQ			7	7	44
31	(Chile) Javier Scuncio Moro										12			Ret^{4}	6	38
32	(Brazil) Pedro Nunes										6					36
33	(Brazil) Antonio Junqueira	4^{3}	Ret													35
34	(Brazil) Edson Reis			9	Ret	DNS	9	DNS								35
35	(Argentina) Ignacio Montenegro										13†	DSQ	5			33
36	(Argentina) Gastón Iansa			7												31
37	(Argentina) Pablo Otero	8	9								Ret					26
38	(Argentina) Matías Cravero										Ret			6	Ret	24
39	(Argentina) Walter Hernández											WD	WD	12	8	24
40	(Brazil) Sergio Ramalho			13							10					24
41	(Brazil) Felipe Papazissis			9												22
42	(Argentina) Figgo Bessone													8	Ret	18
43	(Argentina) Roy Block											12	11			18
44	(Brazil) Renato Braga			Ret	14	9										14
45	(Brazil) Fernando Croce	12	11													14
46	(Argentina) Néstor Girolami										13†					12
47	(Argentina) Javier Manta			12												10
48	(Argentina) Gonzalo Fernández			12												10
49	(Chile) Martín Scuncio Moro										12					10
50	(Uruguay) Hernán Giuria						Ret	11								7
51	(Uruguay) Mauricio Lambiris			15†												6
52	(Brazil) Antonella Bassani			14												3
-	(Brazil) Roberto Possas			DSQ	16	Ret										0
-	(Argentina) Juan Pablo Bessone			Ret							Ret					0
-	(Brazil) Pablo Alves			Ret												0
-	(Brazil) Andre Bragantini			Ret												0
-	(Argentina) Martín Chialvo										Ret					0
-	(Argentina) Isidoro Vezzaro										Ret					0
-	(Argentina) Facundo Marques										Ret					0
-	(Argentina) Franco Coscia										Ret					0
-	(Brazil) Alessandro Marchini	NL	NL													0
-	(Brazil) Raphael Teixeira			DSQ												0
-	(Argentina) Mariano Beraldi								WD	WD						0
Drivers ineligible to score points
-	(Argentina) Jorge Barrio										Ret	**1**	6	1	3	0
-	(Brazil) Thiago Camilo										Ret					0
Pos.	Driver	GYN (Brazil)		INT (Brazil)	GYN (Brazil)		RIV (Uruguay)		ELP (Uruguay)		TRH (Argentina)	BUE (Argentina)		SJV (Argentina)		Pts.

Colour	Result
Gold	Winner
Silver	Second place
Bronze	Third place
Green	Points classification
Blue	Non-points classification
Blue	Non-classified finish (NC)
Purple	Retired, not classified (Ret)
Red	Did not qualify (DNQ)
Red	Did not pre-qualify (DNPQ)
Black	Disqualified (DSQ)
White	Did not start (DNS)
White	Withdrew (WD)
White	Race cancelled (C)
Blank	Did not practice (DNP)
Blank	Did not arrive (DNA)
Blank	Excluded (EX)

**Bold** – Pole position
Italics – Fastest lap
† – Retired, but classified Notes:
^{1 to 16} – refers to points earned at Qualifying 1 and 2.
