= Autódromo Internacional Ayrton Senna (Goiânia) =

Motorsport circuit in Brazil

- Mixed Grand Prix Circuit (1974–present)
- Location: Goiânia, Goiás, Brazil
- Coordinates: 16°43′5″S 49°11′32″W
- FIA Grade: 4 (Note: Autódromo Internacional Ayrton Senna (Goiânia)'s Grade 4 license expired 30 September 2025.)
- Broke ground: 1973
- Opened: 28 July 1974; 52 years ago
- Former names: Autódromo Internacional de Goiânia (1974–1994)
- Major events: Current: Grand Prix motorcycle racing Brazilian motorcycle Grand Prix (1987–1989, 2026); Stock Car Pro Series (1979–1981, 1983–2001, 2004, 2014–2024, 2026); Former: TCR South America (2022); NASCAR Brasil Series (2020–2024); Copa Truck (2017–2024); Porsche Cup Brasil (2015–2018, 2020–2024); Formula 3 Brasil (2014, 2016–2017); F3 Sudamericana (1988–1993, 1995–1997)
- Website: https://goias.gov.br/esporte/

Mixed Grand Prix Circuit (1974–present)
- Length: 3.835 km (2.383 mi)
- Turns: 14
- Race lap record: 1:17.245 ( (Brazil) Christian Hahn, Dallara F309, 2016, F3)

External Circuit (1974–present)
- Length: 2.590 km (1.609 mi)
- Turns: 6
- Race lap record: 0:47.622 ( (Portugal) Antonio Felix da Costa, Chevrolet Cruze Stock Car, 2018, Stock Car Brasil)

Short Circuit (1974–present)
- Length: 1.910 km (1.187 mi)
- Turns: 8

Autódromo Internacional Ayrton Senna is a motorsport race track located in Goiânia, Brazil. From 1987 to 1989, returning in 2026, it hosted the Brazilian motorcycle Grand Prix in MotoGP.

On 14 December 2024, MotoGP announced that the Brazilian Grand Prix will return to Goiania in 2026, with the track being resurfaced and upgraded to be able to host, as it currently has a too low of a FIA/FIM Grade.

In March 2025, several riders such as Luca Marini, along with Franco Morbidelli, two premier class riders and two home riders, Eric Granado and Diogo Moreira, did a demo lap on this circuit in a special visit between the Argentine GP and America GP races.

== Layout configurations ==
Autódromo Internacional Ayrton Senna (Goiânia) layout configurations
Mixed Circuit (1974–present)

External Circuit (1974–present)

Short Circuit (1974–present)

== Events ==
Current

- March: Grand Prix motorcycle racing Brazilian motorcycle Grand Prix
- May: Stock Car Pro Series, Stock Light, Turismo Nacional BR
- December: FIM Intercontinental Games

Former

- Brasileiro de Marcas (2014–2018)
- Brazilian Formula Three Championship (2014, 2016–2017)
- Copa Truck (2017–2024)
- F4 Brazilian Championship (2022–2024)
- Formula 3 Sudamericana (1988–1993, 1995–1997)
- Fórmula Truck (1996–2005, 2007–2009, 2011–2016)
- GT3 Brasil Championship (2007)
- NASCAR Brasil Series (2020–2024)
- Porsche Cup Brasil (2015–2018, 2020–2024)
- Stock Car Brasil
  - Stock Car Corrida Endurance (2015)
  - Stock Car Corrida do Milhão (2014–2015, 2018)
- TCR South America Touring Car Championship (2022)

== Lap records ==
As of May 2026, the fastest official lap records at the Autódromo Internacional Ayrton Senna (Goiânia) are listed as:

Category	Time	Driver	Vehicle	Event
Mixed Grand Prix Circuit (1974–present): 3.835 km (2.383 mi)
Formula 3	1:17.245	Christian Hahn	Dallara F309	2016 Goiânia F3 Brasil round
Prototype	1:17.880	Beto Ribeiro	Metalmoro JLM AJR	2021 Goiânia Endurance Brasil round
MotoGP	1:18.654	Marco Bezzecchi	Aprilia RS-GP26	2026 Brazilian motorcycle Grand Prix
Moto2	1:21.920	Daniel Holgado	Kalex Moto2	2026 Brazilian motorcycle Grand Prix
Stock Car Pro Series	1:23.494	Felipe Fraga	Mitsubishi Eclipse Cross	2026 Goiânia Stock Car Pro round
Porsche Carrera Cup	1:23.875	Alceu Feldmann	Porsche 911 (992 I) GT3 Cup	2022 Goiânia Porsche Sprint Challenge Brasil round
Formula 4	1:24.150	Rogério Grotta	Tatuus F4-T421	2024 1st Goiânia F4 Brazil round
Moto3	1:26.252	Marco Morelli	KTM RC250GP	2026 Brazilian motorcycle Grand Prix
500cc	1:26.980	Eddie Lawson	Honda NSR500	1989 Brazilian motorcycle Grand Prix
Stock Light	1:27.827	Raphael Reis	Chevrolet Cruze JL-G12	2026 Goiânia Stock Light round
GT3	1:28.143	Cláudio Ricci	Ferrari F430 GT3	2007 Goiânia GT3 Brasil round
250cc	1:29.260	Luca Cadalora	Yamaha YZR250	1989 Brazilian motorcycle Grand Prix
TCR Touring Car	1:29.416	Alceu Feldmann	CUPRA León Competición TCR	2022 Goiânia TCR South America round
NASCAR Brasil	1:37.803	Luan Lopes	Ford Mustang NASCAR Brasil	2023 1st Goiânia NASCAR Brasil round
Turismo Nacional BR	1:40.903	João Cardoso	Chevrolet New Onix	2026 1st Goiânia Turismo Nacional Brasil round
Truck racing	1:49.041	Beto Monteiro	Volkswagen Truck	2020 1st Goiânia Copa Truck round
External Grand Prix Circuit (1974–present): 2.590 km (1.609 mi)
Stock Car Brasil	0:47.622	Antonio Felix da Costa	Chevrolet Cruze Stock Car	2018 Corrida do Milhão
Stock Series	0:53.196	Vitor Baptista	Chevrolet Cruze JL-G12	2022 1st Goiânia Stock Series round
NASCAR Brasil	0:57.270	Cayan Chianca	Chevrolet Camaro NASCAR Brasil	2024 Goiânia NASCAR Brasil round
