= Léo Torres =

Brazilian racing driver

- Nationality: (Brazil) Brazilian
- Born: Brazil

NASCAR Brasil Sprint Race career
- Car number: 1
- Best finish: 1st in 2023

Championship titles
- 2023 2021, 2023: NASCAR Brasil Sprint Race; NASCAR Brasil Sprint Race Brazilian Championship Pro

Léo Torres is a Brazilian auto racing driver. He currently drives in the NASCAR Brasil Sprint Race.

== Career ==
In the 2021 season, Torres and teammate Júlio Campos won the Brazilian Championship in the Pro category. In the 2023 season, Torres' race number was changed to #1. He won the Brazilian Championship in the Pro category once again, alongside Campos, as well as his first overall title, becoming the first champion under the NASCAR banner.
