= MC Gui =

Brazilian singer, songwriter and racing driver

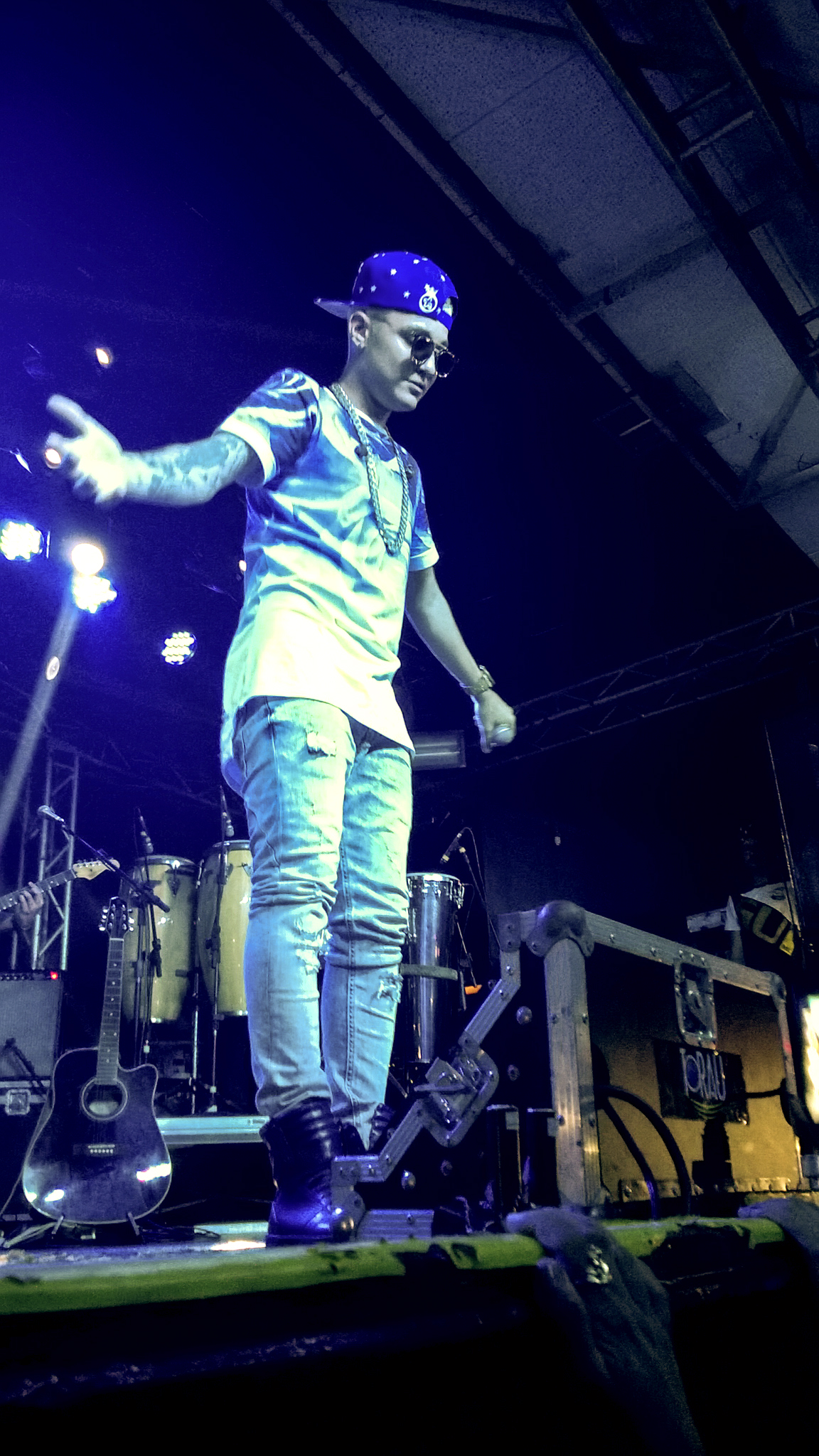
- Gui in 2016
- Born: Guilherme Kaue Castanheira Alves; 19 May 1998 (age 28); São Paulo, Brazil
- Occupations: Singer; songwriter; racing driver
- Years active: 2012–present
- Musical career
- Genres: Pop; Funk ostentação
- Label: Maximo

NASCAR Brasil Sprint Race career
- Car number: 98
- Best finish: 8th (AM) in 2023

Championship titles
- 2023: NASCAR Brasil Sprint Race Special Edition AM

Guilherme Kaue Castanheira Alves (born 19 May 1998), known professionally as MC Gui, is a Brazilian funk ostentação singer, songwriter and racing driver. He is currently part of the cast of the funk production team Ciclone Produtora. He has also competed in the NASCAR Brasil Sprint Race.

== Musical career ==
Gui's career as a funk singer began as a joke. At the age of ten, he, together with his brother, had fun creating funk lyrics, and that was when his father decided to invest in an artistic career for Gui. He gained recognition after releasing the song "Ela Quer", and in 2013, he earned an average of 120 thousand reais per month and performed around fifty shows per month.

In 2013, Gui released the clip "O Bonde Passou", which has more than 1.5 million hits on YouTube. In 2014, he released the single "Beija ou Não Beija?", along with a music video that featured singer Latino. In February 2017, Gui was confirmed as one of the participants in the talent show Dancing Brasil, shown by RecordTV. In May 2019, he was announced as a new hire for funk producer GR6 Music. In 2021, he was confirmed as one of the participants in the thirteenth season of the reality show A Fazenda, being the 13th eliminated from the reality show, together with Aline Mineiro, in which he obtained 7.44% of the votes to remain in the game, in a farm against Bill Araújo and Marina Ferrari.

== Auto racing ==
In 2023, Gui competed in NASCAR Brasil Sprint Race, driving a Ford Mustang. He won four races in the AM division, including two races in the Special Edition rounds en route to winning the Special Edition AM championship.

== Personal life ==
On 21 April 2014, Gui lost his brother, Gustavo Matheus Castanheira, initially suspected of having a cardiac arrest. The forensic report, however, indicated that death was the result of a cocaine overdose.

== Controversies ==
=== Legal problems ===
In October 2016, Gui was arrested by the Military Police for driving at high speed and without a license. A black Land Rover Discovery, which was the singer's car, was unlicensed and also had a lot of traffic fines. In November 2018, Gui's father's production company had documents and drugs seized by the Civil Police.

=== Accusations of bullying ===
When he was at Walt Disney World, in Orlando, Florida, on 21 October 2019, Gui posted a video on social media in which he pointed the camera at a girl dressed up as the character Boo from the movie Monsters, Inc. and, laughing, says: "We arrived at Disney and, bro, look at that.. look at that little girl!". Then, the girl turns her face. On social media, comments appeared saying that the singer had practiced bullying. He later deleted the post and denied any wrongdoing.

According to Gui, the matter had an "unfair" impact on the press. Several companies took a stand against the singer's attitude and there were some that canceled the sale of products and the singer's shows. On Twitter, Brazilians raised the hashtag #JullyPrincessInDisneyworld, a campaign for Disney to invite the girl to go to the park again with a VIP invitation. The girl was identified as Jully Collen, who was undergoing chemotherapy to treat leukemia.

Later, notes of repudiation against his attitude came, this time from Felipe Neto, Jojo Todynho and Felipe Castanhari, which had repercussions on social media. Gui's mother announced that she was trying to find the girl in the video to make amends for the situation. Madeleine Lacsko, writing for Gazeta do Povo, criticized the singer's apology video; additionally, she criticized the media, some artists and social networks that make money at the expense of other people's problems. She also criticized internet users who attacked MC Guimê, confusing him with MC Gui.

Still in October 2019, a petition was created asking that Gui be banned from Disney. This event made Gui become one of the most searched terms on Google in 2019, according to O Estado de S. Paulo, the searches were due to the negative repercussion of the case.

=== Crowding during the COVID-19 pandemic ===
On 14 March 2021, during a critical period of the COVID-19 pandemic, Gui was detained by the Civil Police in a clandestine casino in the city of São Paulo. Gabriel Barbosa, a Flamengo player, and two hundred other people were also in the casino.

== Discography ==
=== Live albums ===
Album	Details
O Bonde É Seu - Ao Vivo (+ 30.000 copies)	Release: 2014; Formats: CD, DVD, digital download; Label: Universal Music
MC Gui	Release: 2016; Formats: EP, digital download; Label: Universal Music

=== Singles ===
Year	Title	Album
2013	"O Bonde Passou"	Non-album single
2013	"Ela Quer"	Non-album single
2014	"Beija ou Não Beija?"	Non-album single
2014	"Sonhar"	O Bonde É Seu - Ao Vivo
2014	"Rainha do Baile" (feat. Pocah)	O Bonde É Seu - Ao Vivo
2015	"Segue o Fluxo" (feat. MC Kapela)	O Bonde É Seu - Ao Vivo
2015	"Sua História"	Non-album single
2016	"Vai Começar a Ousadia"	Non-album single
2016	"Tchuk Tchuk" (feat. MC THD)	Non-album single
2017	"Na Hora do Amor"	Non-album single
2017	"Chapei o Coco"	Non-album single
2018	"No Talentinho" (feat. MC Loma e As Gêmeas Lacração)	Non-album single
2019	"Coração Trocado" (feat. MC Bruninho)	Non-album single

=== DVDs ===
Album	Details
O Bonde É Seu - Ao Vivo (+ 30.000 copies)	Release: 2014; Formats: CD, DVD, digital download; Label: Universal Music

== Filmography ==
Television
Year	Title	Role	Broadcaster	Notes
2013–2014	Domingo Legal	Himself	SBT	"A Princesa e o Plebeu"
2015	Chiquititas	Himself	SBT	Special participation
2017	Dancing Brasil	Participant (withdrew)	RecordTV	Season 1
2021	A Fazenda	Participant (8th place)	RecordTV	Season 13

== Awards and nominations ==
Year	Award	Category	Result
2014	Meus Prêmios Nick	Musical Discovery	Nominated
2014	Capricho Awards	Cantor Nacional	Nominated
2014	Capricho Awards	Fã-Clube do Ano "Guináticas"	Nominated
2014	Multishow Brazilian Music Award	Experimente	Nominated
2014	Prêmio Jovem Brasileiro	Melhor Cantor Jovem	Won
2015	Prêmio Jovem Brasileiro	Melhor Cantor Jovem	Won
2015	Troféu Internet	Melhor Cantor	Nominated
2015	Meus Prêmios Nick	Favourite Male Singer	Nominated
