= NASCAR Brasil Series =

South American auto racing series

- Category: Stock cars
- Country: Brazil
- Region: South America
- Inaugural season: 2012
- Constructors: Chevrolet, Ford
- Engine suppliers: Action Power
- Tire suppliers: Pirelli
- Drivers' champion: Overall: (Brazil) Gabriel Casagrande/Alex Said; Challenge: (Brazil) Jorge Martelli
- Official website: www.nascarbrasil.com.br

The NASCAR Brasil Series (formerly known as Sprint Race, GT Sprint Race and NASCAR Brasil Sprint Race), commonly referred to as NASCAR Brasil or Sprint Race, is a NASCAR stock car series based in Brazil. It is one of NASCAR's four international series alongside the NASCAR Canada Series, NASCAR Mexico Series, and the NASCAR Euro Series and is the only one to be based in South America.

== History ==
=== Early history ===
NASCAR Brasil Series' roots can be traced to 2011, when rumors of a Super Cup championship first circulated in the Brazilian racing scene. Super Cup is a category that promised a low cost championship hosted in tracks outside of the traditional Brazilian venues. Super Cup ultimately failed to establish themselves, but on January 18, 2012 a spiritual successor series named Sprint Race was founded by Thiago Marques, a former competitor in the Stock Car Pro Series and the younger brother of ex-Formula One driver Tarso Marques. Sprint Race was formed as an entry-level competition series designed to facilitate a beginner driver's transition to the higher racing categories in Brazil.

The inaugural season was held on the same year and a total of 25 drivers entered the 2012 season. It featured a total of 18 races across 9 rounds, with double points being awarded in the final round. The driver pairing of Guilherme Sperafico and Fabio Brecailo were credited as Sprint Race's inaugural race winners on the series' first ever race at Autódromo José Carlos Pace, while Gustavo Martins was crowned as the series' inaugural champion after scoring four race wins.

The 2013 season featured 16 races across 8 rounds and saw the driver pairing of Gaetano di Mauro and Guilherme Salas took the title after winning five races. In 2014, the series was split into two classes: Pro and GP class, with titles being awarded separately towards the drivers that scored the most points in their respective classes. Despite this, both classes continued to run their races together. Flávio Lisboa was crowned as the overall champion in the now-rebranded Pro class, while Adriano Amaral became the first driver to win the title in the GP class.

In the 2018 season, the series hosted their first races outside of Brazil when they hosted a race at Uruguay's Autódromo Eduardo Prudêncio Cabrera. The series returned to Uruguay in 2019 and on the same year, the series made its first races outside of South America as the series hosted the Sprint Race International Cup in tracks such as Homestead–Miami Speedway and Sebring International Raceway.

=== GT Sprint Race and NASCAR ===
In 2020, the series rebranded itself into the GT Sprint Race and numerous changes was made to the series. The GP class was discontinued and in its place, two new divisions were formed: The AM and Pro AM classes. A new car generation, inspired from the cars raced in NASCAR, was also introduced and the series switched their tire suppliers from Pirelli to Yokohama. Thiago Camilo was crowned as the overall champion in the Pro class that year, while Weldes Campos and Luiz Arruda were crowned as the inaugural champions of the Pro AM and AM classes respectively.

The series was later rebranded to the NASCAR Brasil Sprint Race on November 16, 2022 after the series signed an agreement with NASCAR to give the series an official NASCAR-sanctioning status starting from the 2023 season. In 2023, NASCAR intends on adding oval race tracks to the schedule. In 2025, the series was rebranded to the NASCAR Brasil Series, similar to the branding of other NASCAR Regional Series. On September 20, 2026, at the Circuito dos Cristais, Tatiana Calderón became the first woman to win a race in the NASCAR Brasil Series.

== Cars ==
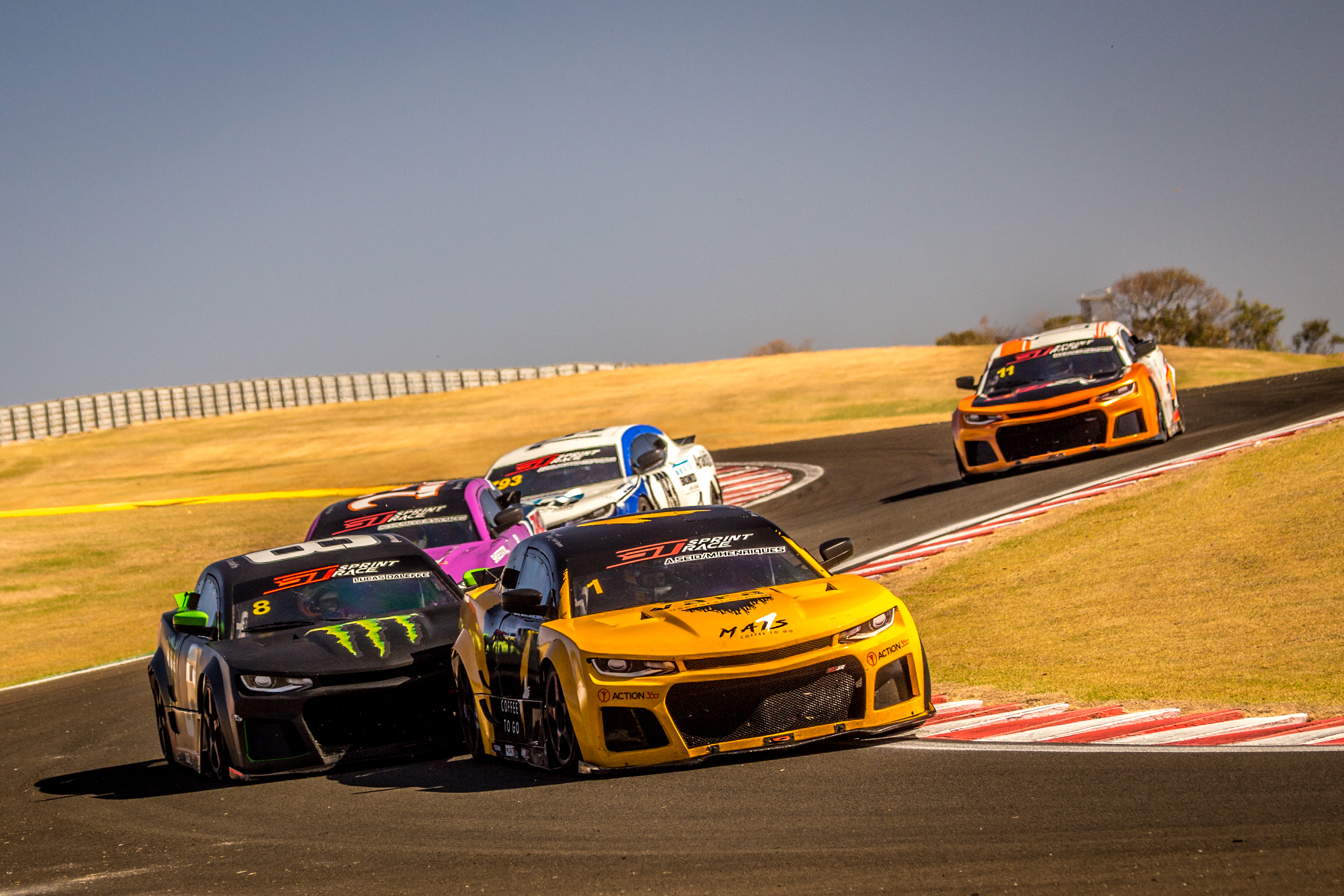
The previous generation of Chevrolet Camaro bodied NASCAR Brasil race cars racing at Autódromo Velo Città in 2020.

NASCAR Brasil Series' cars featured a peripheral tubular space frame chassis reinforced with aluminum plates. In its original guise, the car used an unbranded hatchback body model based on the Renault Clio. The driver is positioned in the middle of the car for better weight distribution. It uses a six-speed sequential gearbox, independent suspension, and engines supplied by Action Power. For the first two seasons, the cars used a 220 hp, inline-four turbo engines sourced from Renault before it was upgraded to a 270 hp, 3.6 liter V6 engine sourced from Chevrolet in 2014.

A new generation of car was introduced by the series in 2020. The new car featured a brand new body model inspired from the American NASCAR series, with composite body styles based on the Chevrolet Camaro and Ford Mustang being available to be chosen for the teams participating; the NASCAR Brasil Series is one of two NASCAR series where Toyota does not participate, the other being the NASCAR Canada Series. The new generation of cars featured an improved aerodynamic package and was claimed to have a 20% increase in corner speed, despite the removal of the detached rear wing in favor of integrated rear spoiler.

The new generation car received several changes in the 2022 season. New racing seats, inspired from the seats used in NASCAR, was introduced to increase driver's protection from head and neck injuries due to lateral movement during crashes. A rear stabilizer bar was added, with drivers being able to choose between three settings: Soft, hard, and off. The engine also received an updated electronic injection unit to improve its acceleration.

NASCAR Brasil Series featured Pirelli as the exclusive tire supplier of the series. Pirelli is the exclusive tire supplier starting from the inaugural season in 2012, with the exception of the 2020 season where the series ran Yokohama tires instead.

=== 2020-2025 Specifications ===
- Chassis: Tubular space frame with reinforced aluminum plates.
- Engine Displacement: 2.2 L (2,200 cc) inline-four (2012-2013), 3.6 L (3,600 cc) V6 (2014-present).
- Aspiration: Turbocharged forced induction (2012-2013), naturally aspirated (2014-present).
- Transmission: 6-speed sequential.
- Power: 300 hp
- Weight: 1000 kg
- Height: 1,280 mm
- Length: 4,900 mm
- Wheelbase: 2,800 mm
- Width: 1,940 mm

=== 2026 Specifications ===
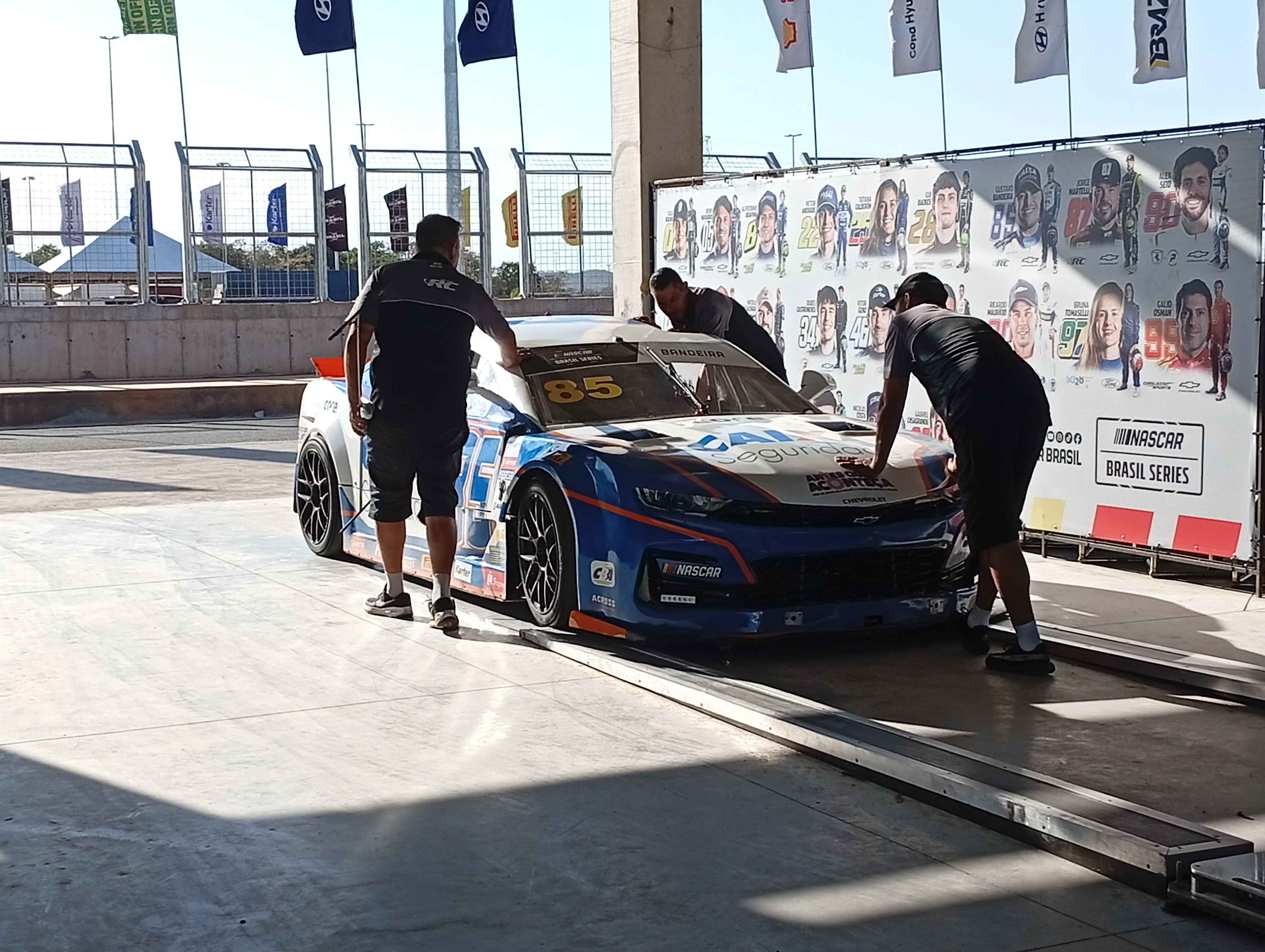
The 2026 generation of Nascar Brasil "RISE 26" Chevrolet Camaro at Cuiabá round.

On 30 September 2025, Nascar Brasil Series revealed an updated version of their car, called the RISE26, to be used from the 2026 season. The key improvement is to the chassis, which is made from carbon fiber rather than fiberglass, reducing the weight of the car by around 80 kilograms (180 lb). The upgraded V6 engine, known as the NB-26, will have an additional 60 hp, and the fuel tank will be increased by 20 L, with 100% ethanol fuel in use. Further improvements include moving the drivers' seat further to the left to assist rescue teams, as the car will no longer have functioning doors, just as in the NASCAR Cup Series. A new Pirelli tire compound has also been made for the series, and there are improvements to the electronics, steering wheel, suspension, and shape of the chassis.

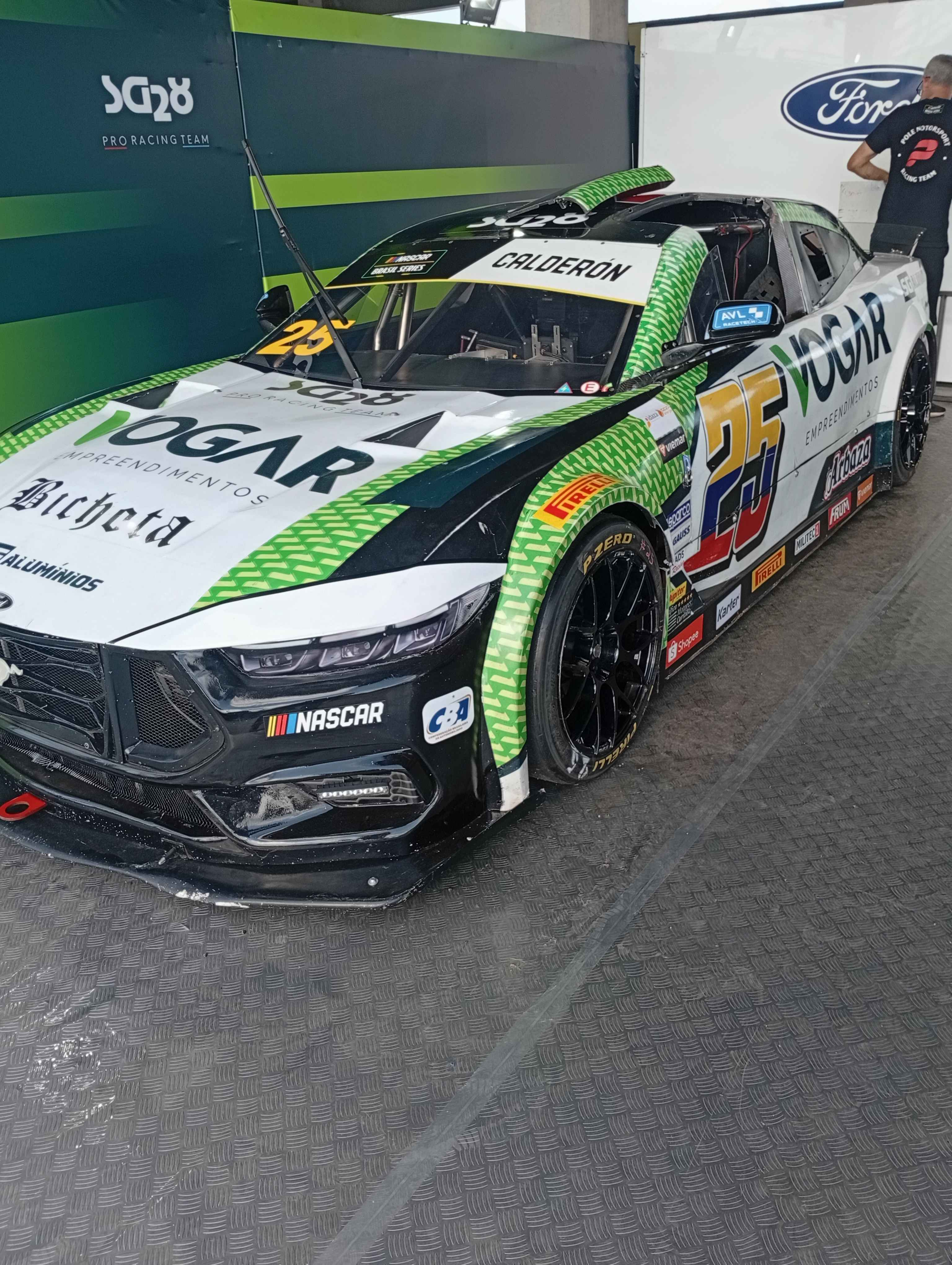
The 2026 generation of Nascar Brasil "RISE26" Ford Mustang at Cuaibá round

=== 2026 car specifications ===
- Chassis: 3-piece modular chassis (front/rear clips + central cell) made of carbon fiber while central cell is made from polished 304 stainless steel
- Engine: V6 running on 100% ethanol
- Transmission: 6-speed powershift with paddles
- Power: 360 hp
- Weight: 960 kg
- Power-to-weight ratio: 2.66 Kg/hp
- Torque (max): 55 Kgf.m
- Suspension: Double wishbone
- Tires: Pirelli TH4, size 265/645R18 PZERO
- Fuel Tank: Kevlar, 90L

== Tracks ==
Locations of the tracks that have hosted a Sprint Race/GT Sprint Race/NASCAR Brasil Sprint Race/NASCAR Brasil Series race. Green dots represent current tracks, red dots represent former tracks, and purple dots represent future tracks.
Locations of the tracks outside of South America that have hosted a Sprint Race/GT Sprint Race/NASCAR Brasil Sprint Race/NASCAR Brasil Series race. Green dots represent current tracks, purple dots represent future tracks, red dots represent former tracks.

The following are the tracks which have been used, currently are in use, and/or are scheduled to be used in the NASCAR Brasil Series. Tracks marked in bold are tracks used in the 2026 NASCAR Brasil Series season.

Years	Track	Location	Type
2018–2019	Autódromo Eduardo Prudêncio Cabrera	Rivera, Uruguay	Road course
2020–2024	Autódromo Internacional Ayrton Senna (Goiânia)	Goiânia, Goiás, Brazil	Road course
2012–present	**Autódromo Internacional Ayrton Senna (Londrina)**	Londrina, Paraná, Brazil	Road course
2026	**Autódromo Internacional de Brasília**	Brasília, Distrito Federal, Brazil	Road course
2013–2021, 2023–present	**Autódromo Internacional de Cascavel**	Cascavel, Paraná, Brazil	Road course
2026	**Autódromo Internacional de Chapecó**	Chapecó, Santa Catarina, Brazil	Road course
2012–2018, 2020–2021	Autódromo Internacional de Curitiba	Curitiba, Paraná, Brazil	Road course
2026	**Autódromo Internacional de Mato Grosso**	Cuiabá, Mato Grosso, Brazil	Road course
2014, 2022, 2026	**Autódromo Internacional de Santa Cruz do Sul**	Santa Cruz do Sul, Rio Grande do Sul, Brazil	Road course
2013, 2015, 2021–2025	Autódromo Internacional de Tarumã	Tarumã, Rio Grande do Sul, Brazil	Road course
2024–2025	Autódromo Internacional Orlando Moura	Campo Grande, Mato Grosso do Sul, Brazil	Road course
2021, 2024	Autódromo Internacional Potenza	Lima Duarte, Minas Gerais, Brazil	Road course
2017–2023, 2025–present	**Autódromo Velo Città**	Mogi Guaçu, São Paulo, Brazil	Road course
2024–present	**Circuito dos Cristais**	Curvelo, Minas Gerais, Brazil	Oval track
2019	Homestead–Miami Speedway	Homestead, Florida, United States	Road course
2012–present	**Autódromo José Carlos Pace**	São Paulo, São Paulo, Brazil	Road course
2019	Sebring International Raceway	Sebring, Florida, United States	Road course

== Season schedules ==
=== 2012 ===
Round	Circuit	Date (DD/MM)	Type
1	Autódromo José Carlos Pace	08/04	Road course
2	Autódromo José Carlos Pace	22/04	Road course
3	Autódromo José Carlos Pace	13/05	Road course
4	Autódromo José Carlos Pace	10/06	Road course
5	Autódromo Internacional de Curitiba	22/07	Road course
6	Autódromo Internacional de Curitiba	02/09	Oval track
7	Autódromo Internacional Ayrton Senna (Londrina)	14/10	Road course
8	Autódromo Internacional de Curitiba	04/11	Road course
9	Autódromo Internacional de Curitiba	02/12	Road course
10	Autódromo José Carlos Pace	22/12	Road course

=== 2014 ===
Round	Circuit	Date (DD/MM)	Type
1	Autódromo José Carlos Pace	27/04	Road course
2	Autódromo Internacional de Santa Cruz do Sul	18/05	Road course
3	Autódromo José Carlos Pace	22/06	Road course
4	Autódromo Internacional de Cascavel	03/08	Road course
5	Autódromo Internacional de Curitiba	24/08	Road course
6	Autódromo Internacional Ayrton Senna (Londrina)	21/09	Road course
7	Autódromo Internacional de Curitiba	09/11	Oval track
8	Autódromo Internacional de Curitiba	07/12	Road course

=== 2015 ===
Round	Circuit	Date (DD/MM)	Type
1	Autódromo Internacional de Tarumã	29/03	Road course
2	Autódromo Internacional de Curitiba	10/05	Road course
3	Autódromo Internacional Ayrton Senna (Londrina)	06/06	Road course
4	Autódromo José Carlos Pace	12/07	Road course
5	Autódromo Internacional de Curitiba	09/08	Road course
6	Autódromo Internacional de Cascavel	20/09	Road course
7	Autódromo Internacional de Curitiba	15/11	Oval track
8	Autódromo José Carlos Pace	19/12	Road course

=== 2016 ===
Round	Circuit	Date (DD/MM)	Type
1	Autódromo Internacional de Curitiba	20/03	Road course
2	Autódromo José Carlos Pace	24/04	Road course
3	Autódromo Internacional de Curitiba	29/05	Oval track
4	Autódromo Internacional de Curitiba	19/06	Road course
5	Autódromo José Carlos Pace	14/08	Road course
6	Autódromo Internacional Ayrton Senna (Londrina)	18/09	Road course
7	Autódromo Internacional de Cascavel	23/10	Road course
8	Autódromo José Carlos Pace	18/12	Road course

=== 2017 ===
Round	Circuit	Date (DD/MM)	Type
1	Autódromo Internacional de Curitiba	09/04	Oval track
2	Autódromo José Carlos Pace	30/04	Road course
3	Autódromo Internacional de Cascavel	28/05	Road course
4	Autódromo José Carlos Pace	30/07	Road course
5	Autódromo Internacional de Curitiba	20/08	Road course
6	Autódromo Velo Città	24/09	Road course
7	Autódromo Internacional Ayrton Senna (Londrina)	05/11	Road course
8	Autódromo Internacional de Curitiba	03/12	Road course

=== 2018 ===
Round	Circuit	Date (DD/MM)	Type
1	Autódromo Internacional de Curitiba	31/03	Oval track
2	Autódromo Eduardo Prudêncio Cabrera	06/05	Road course
3	Autódromo José Carlos Pace	17/06	Road course
4	Autódromo Internacional Ayrton Senna (Londrina)	21/07	Road course
5	Autódromo José Carlos Pace	02/09	Road course
6	Autódromo Velo Città	14/10	Road course
7	Autódromo Internacional de Cascavel	18/11	Road course
8	Autódromo Internacional de Curitiba	16/12	Road course

=== 2019 ===
Round	Circuit	Date (DD/MM)	Type
1	Autódromo Internacional Ayrton Senna (Londrina)	24/03	Road course
2	Autódromo José Carlos Pace	20/04	Road course
3	Homestead–Miami Speedway	30/06	Road course
4	Sebring International Raceway	07/07	Road course
5	Autódromo Internacional Ayrton Senna (Londrina)	07/09	Road course
6	Autódromo Internacional de Cascavel	05/10	Road course
7	Autódromo Eduardo Prudêncio Cabrera	20/10	Road course
8	Autódromo Velo Città	30/11	Road course
9	Autódromo José Carlos Pace	21/12	Road course

=== 2020 ===
Round	Circuit	Date (DD/MM)	Type
1	Autódromo Internacional de Cascavel	31/07 - 01/08	Road course
2	Autódromo Velo Città	29/08	Road course
3	Autódromo Internacional Ayrton Senna (Goiânia)	20/09	Road course
4	Autódromo Internacional de Curitiba	08/10	Road course
5	Autódromo Internacional de Curitiba	11/10	Road course
6	Autódromo Internacional Ayrton Senna (Londrina)	01/11	Road course
7	Autódromo José Carlos Pace	28/11	Road course
8	Autódromo Internacional de Curitiba	19/12	Road course

=== 2021 ===
Round	Circuit	Date (DD/MM)	Type
1	Autódromo Velo Città	02/05	Road course
2	Autódromo Internacional Ayrton Senna (Goiânia)	23/05	Road course
3	Autódromo José Carlos Pace	27/06	Road course
4	Autódromo Internacional de Cascavel	18/07	Road course
5	Autódromo Internacional de Tarumã	15/08	Road course
6	Autódromo Internacional de Curitiba	05/09	Road course
7	Autódromo Internacional Potenza	03/10	Road course
8	Autódromo Internacional Ayrton Senna (Londrina)	31/10	Road course
9	Autódromo Internacional de Curitiba	05/12	Road course

=== 2022 ===
Round	Circuit	Date (DD/MM)	Type
1	Autódromo Internacional de Santa Cruz do Sul	13/03	Road course
2	Autódromo Velo Città	03/04	Road course
3	Autódromo José Carlos Pace	01/05	Road course
4	Autódromo Internacional Ayrton Senna (Goiânia)	05/06	Road course
5	Autódromo Internacional Ayrton Senna (Londrina)	10/07	Road course
6	Autódromo José Carlos Pace	21/08	Road course
7	Autódromo Internacional de Tarumã	18/09	Road course
8	Autódromo Internacional Ayrton Senna (Goiânia)	06/11	Road course
9	Autódromo Internacional Ayrton Senna (Londrina)	11/12	Road course

=== 2023 ===
Round	Circuit	Date (DD/MM)	Type
1	Autódromo Internacional Ayrton Senna (Goiânia)	19/03	Oval track
2	Autódromo José Carlos Pace	30/04	Road course
3	Autódromo Internacional Ayrton Senna (Londrina)	03/06	Road course
4	Autódromo Internacional de Cascavel	02/07	Road course
5	Autódromo Internacional Ayrton Senna (Goiânia)	30/07	Road course
6	Autódromo Velo Città	10/09	Road course
7	Autódromo Internacional de Tarumã	15/10	Road course
8	Autódromo José Carlos Pace	10/12	Road course

=== 2024 ===
Round	Circuit	Date (DD/MM)	Type
1	Autódromo Internacional Orlando Moura	17/03	Road course
2	Autódromo Internacional Ayrton Senna (Goiânia)	14/04	Oval track
3	Autódromo Internacional Ayrton Senna (Londrina)	11/05	Road course
4	Autódromo Internacional Potenza	16/06	Road course
5	Autódromo José Carlos Pace	04/08	Road course
6	Autódromo Internacional de Cascavel	01/09	Road course
7	Autódromo Internacional de Tarumã	13/10	Road course
8	Circuito dos Cristais	17/11	Oval track

=== 2025 ===
Round	Circuit	Date (DD/MM)	Type
1	Autódromo Internacional Orlando Moura	23/03	Road course
2	Autódromo Internacional Ayrton Senna (Londrina)	13/04	Road course
3	Autódromo José Carlos Pace	18/05	Road course
4	Autódromo Internacional de Tarumã	15/06	Road course
5	Autódromo Internacional de Cascavel	13/07	Road course
6	Autódromo Velo Città	24/08	Road course
7	Circuito dos Cristais	21/09	Oval track
8	Autódromo Velo Città	02/11	Road course
9	Autódromo José Carlos Pace	07/12	Road course

== Champions ==
=== Brazilian Championship ===
Season	Pro	Pro AM/Challenge	AM	GP
2012	(Brazil) Gustavo Martins	Not held		
2013	(Brazil) Gaetano di Mauro (Brazil) Guilherme Salas	Not held		
2014	(Brazil) Flávio Lisboa	Not held		(Brazil) Adriano Amaral
2015	(Brazil) Pietro Rimbano	Not held		(Brazil) Fábio Brecailo
2016	(Brazil) Juninho Berlanda (Brazil) Eduardo Berlanda	Not held		(Brazil) Vinícius Margiota
2017	(Brazil) Juninho Berlanda	Not held		(Brazil) Kau Machado (Brazil) Jorge Martelli
2018	(Brazil) Gerson Campos	Not held		(Brazil) Cassio Cortes
2019	(Brazil) João Rosate (Brazil) Bruno Smielevski	Not held		(Brazil) Daniel Coutinho (Brazil) Josimar Jr
2020	(Brazil) Ricardo Sperafico	(Brazil) Alex Seid (Brazil) Marcelo Henriques	(Brazil) Luiz Arruda	Not held
2021	(Brazil) Júlio Campos (Brazil) Léo Torres	(Brazil) Pedro Aizza	(Brazil) Luis Debes	Not held
2022	(Brazil) Luciano Zangirolami (Brazil) Sérgio Ramalho	(Brazil) Arthur Gama	(Brazil) Giovani Girotto	Not held
2023	(Brazil) Júlio Campos (Brazil) Léo Torres	(Brazil) Leonardo Reis (Brazil) Rafael Reis	(Brazil) Henry Couto	Not held
2024	(Brazil) Vitor Genz	(Brazil) Jorge Martelli	Not held	Not held
2025	(Brazil) Rubens Barrichello	(Brazil) Jorge Martelli	Not held	Not held

=== Special Edition ===
Season	Pro	ProAM/Challenge	AM	GP
2019 (Note: The 2019 Sprint Race Special Edition had International Cup as official name. The series hosted the championship in Autódromo Eduardo Prudêncio Cabrera, Homestead–Miami Speedway and Sebring International Raceway.)	(Brazil) João Rosate (Brazil) Bruno Smielevski	Not held		(Brazil) Daniel Coutinho (Brazil) Dudu Trindade
2020	(Brazil) Pedro Lopes (Brazil) Gabriel Silva	(Brazil) Weldes Campos (Brazil) Ricardo Sperafico	(Brazil) Raphael Teixeira	Not held
2021	(Brazil) Thiago Camilo	(Brazil) Pedro Aizza	(Brazil) Giovani Girotto	Not held
2022	(Brazil) Thiago Camilo (Brazil) Raphael Teixeira	(Brazil) Diogo Moscato	(Brazil) Giovanni Girotto	Not held
2023	(Brazil) Vitor Genz (Brazil) Rafael Dias	(Brazil) Guilherme Backes (Brazil) Gabriel Casagrande	(Brazil) MC Gui	Not held
2024	(Brazil) Gabriel Casagrande (Brazil) Alex Seid	(Brazil) Victor Andrade	Not held	Not held
2025	(Brazil) Gabriel Casagrande	(Brazil) Alfredinho Ibiapina	Not held	Not held

=== Overall ===
Season	Pro	ProAM/Challenge	AM	GP
2019	(Brazil) João Rosate (Brazil) Bruno Smielevski	Not held		(Brazil) Daniel Coutinho
2020	(Brazil) Thiago Camilo	(Brazil) Weldes Campos	(Brazil) Luiz Arruda	Not held
2021	(Brazil) Thiago Camilo	(Brazil) Pedro Aizza	(Brazil) Walter Lester	Not held
2022	(Brazil) Raphael Teixeira	(Brazil) Arthur Gama	(Brazil) Giovani Girotto	Not held
2023	(Brazil) Léo Torres	(Brazil) Guilherme Backes	(Brazil) Brendon Zonta	Not held
2024	(Brazil) Gabriel Casagrande (Brazil) Alex Seid	(Brazil) Victor Andrade	Not held	Not held
2025	(Brazil) Rubens Barrichello	(Brazil) Jorge Martelli	Not held	Not held

=== Teams ===
Season	Team Champion	Car
2025	Full Time Sports	Ford Mustang
