= Vitor Genz =

Brazilian auto race driver

- Nationality: (Brazil) Brazilian
- Born: 11 November 1988 (age 38) Brazil

NASCAR Brasil Series career
- Debut season: 2022
- Current team: R.Mattheis
- Car number: 46
- Wins: 7
- Best finish: 1st in 2023

Championship titles
- 2023 2024: NASCAR Brasil Sprint Race-Special Edition; NASCAR Brasil Series- Brazil Championship

Vitor Genz (born 11 November 1988) is a Brazilian auto racing driver. He currently drives for R.Mattheis Motorsport in the NASCAR Brasil Series. He was champion of the 2023 NASCAR Brasil Sprint Race sub-championship "Special edition" and 2024 NASCAR Brasil Series sub-championship "Brazilian Championship" and is known by his Driving simulator classes on IRacing and Automobilista 2. He had competed in Mini Challenge Brasil, Stock Car Pro Series, Copa Petrobras de Marcas, and Império Endurance Brasil.

== Career ==
Early Career:

Genz's debut in motorsport was in 2007 on Stock Jr Brasil and the Brazilian endurance series "Campeonato Brasileiro de Endurance" where he was champion, in the next year he moved up to the "Pick-up racing Brasil" and in the following years the "Mini Challenge Brasil" where he was runner-up in 2011 and champion in 2012.

Stock Car Brasil:

In 2013, Genz debuted in Stock Car Brasil for Gramacho Competições. In the series he did 117 races, having his maiden win in 2017 on Autódromo Internacional de Cascavel round, his last season was in 2018 with Eisenbah Racing Team.

Império Endurance Brasil:

Genz did sporadic races in Império Endurance Brasil in the years of 2019, 2021 and 2022, where he got one win, a pole position and four podiums, in his full seasons in 2020 and 2023 where he was runner-up together with Vicente Orige and Henrique Bonatti with two wins, one pole position and eight podiums.

GT Sprint Race/NASCAR Brasil:

In 2022, Genz started his career in the so-called "GT Sprint Race" which would later be rebranded as NASCAR Brasil Series, In 2023, he was champion of the sub-championship "Special Edition" with two wins and in 2024 he was champion of "Brazil Championship" with three wins, ending with a second place on overall standings.

For the 2025 season, Genz joined the grid with R.Mattheis Motorsport.

== Racing record ==
Season	Series	Team	Races	Wins	Poles	F/ Laps	Podiums	Points	Position
2007	Stock Jr Brasil	?	2	0	0	0	1	29	15th
2007	Campeonato Brasileiro de Endurance	Latina Veículos	3	1	1	0	2	?	1st
2008	Pick-up Racing Brasil	Mottin Racing	8	0	0	0	2	49	7th
2009	Pick-up Racing Brasil	Mottin Racing	2	0	0	0	0	23	19th
2010	Mini Challenge Brasil		6	1	0	3	3	102	10th
2011	Mini Challenge Brasil		16	3	2	5	8	208	2nd
2012	Mini Challenge Brasil		24	7	5	3	16	403	1st
2012	Campeonato Brasileiro de GT - GT4	BMW Team Brasil	14	3	5	0	10	174	10th
2013	Stock Car Brasil	Gramacho Competições	12	0	0	0	0	16	30th
2014	Stock Car Brasil	Boettger Competições	21	0	0	0	0	49	26th
2015	Stock Car Brasil	Boettger Competições	21	0	0	0	0	124	15th
2016	Stock Car Brasil	Eisenbahn Racing Team	20	0	0	0	1	158	13th
2017	Stock Car Brasil	Eisenbahn Racing Team	22	1	0	0	2	104	16th
2018	Stock Car Brasil	Eisenbahn Racing Team	21	0	0	0	0	43	22nd
2019	Império Endurance Brasil - P1	JLM Racing	1	0	1	0	1	150	12th
2019	Copa Truck	PP Competições	2	0	0	0	0	?	?
2019	Copa HB20-Pro	?	4	1	0	1	2	42	12th
2020	Império Endurance Brasil - P1	JLM Racing	6	0	3	1	1	215	11th
2020	Stock Car Brasil	KTF Sports	2	0	0	0	0	11	26th
2021	Império Endurance Brasil - P1	Rsports Team	1	0	0	0	0	?	?
2021	AMG Cup Brasil	Cavaleiro Sports	2	0	1	0	0	1	29th
2022	Império Endurance Brasil - P1	Mottin Racing	3	1	0	0	2	?	?
2022	GT Sprint Race		4	1	1	1	1	?	?
2022	TCR South America Touring Car Championship	Crown Racing	1	0	0	0	0	66	22nd
2022	TCR South America Touring Car Championship	Cobra Racing Team	1	0	0	0	0	66	22nd
2023	NASCAR Brasil Sprint Race		9	2	3	0	5	192	4th
2023	Império Endurance Brasil - P1	Motocar Racing	8	2	1	2	2	850	2nd
2024	NASCAR Brasil Series	Singus Competition	17	3	0	0	8	299	2nd
2025	NASCAR Brasil Series	R.Mattheis Motorsport	10	1	1	0	3	120	4th*

* Season still in progress.
