= Turismo Nacional BR =

Auto racing championship in Brazil

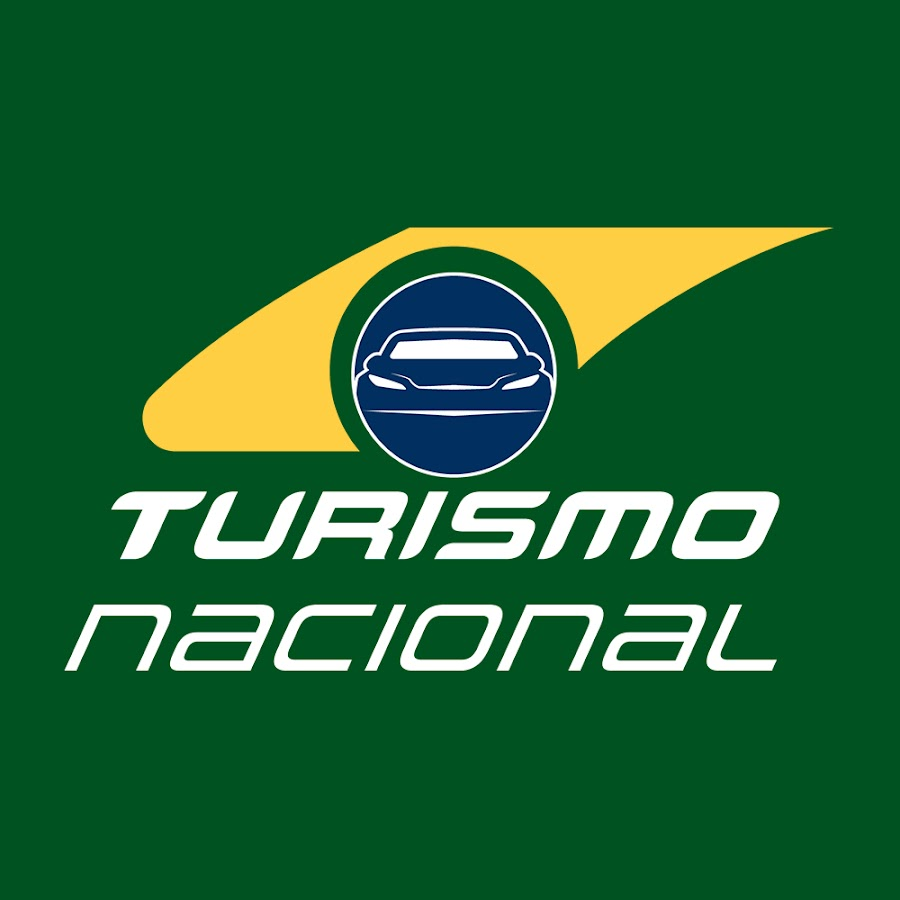
- Category: Touring car racing
- Country: Brazil
- Inaugural season: 2017
- Manufacturers: Chevrolet · Citroën · Fiat · Ford · Hyundai · Nissan · Toyota · Volkswagen
- Drivers' champion: Juninho Berlanda (TN PRO); Gustavo Magnabosco (Super); Nilton Rossoni and Fabrício Lançoni (Elite); Henrique Basso (A); Ricardo Raimundo (B); Guto Baldo (Sênior)
- Official website: https://www.stockproseries.com.br/turismo-nacional

Turismo Nacional, often referred to as Turismo Nacional BR, is a touring car racing series based in Brazil which is promoted by Vicar. The series uses modified production cars from the Brazilian market. Turismo Nacional was created in 2017 and has been promoted by Vicar since 2021. The championship consists of six distinct classes: A, B, Super, PRO, Elite, and Senior. The series is composed of six overall rounds which are subdivided into four 20-minute races.

== Classes ==
=== Cars ===
In 2018, the class system was updated from before to include the following classes for cars:

- Class 1: Cars that have been in the market for less than three years;
- Class 2: Cars that have been in the market for more than three years.

=== Drivers ===
And the following categories for drivers, which depend on the experience level:

- Senior
- B
- A
- Elite
- Super
- PRO

== Models ==
Below is a list of models which are homologated to race in the series.

Manufacturer	Model
Chevrolet	Onix, New Onix
Citroën	C3
Fiat	Argo, Mobi, Uno
Ford	New Ka
Hyundai	HB20
Nissan	March
Peugeot	208
Renault	Sandeiro, Kwid
Toyota	Etios, Yaris
Volkswagen	Gol, UP!, New Polo

== Specifications ==
=== Engine ===
Cars in Turismo Nacional are powered by a 2000cc (2L) Inline 4. The engine is powered by ethanol.

=== Transmission ===
The transmission used in the cars is a 6-speed semi-automatic gearbox which is manufactured by Vicar's Stock Tech.

== Champions ==
=== TN Pro ===
Season	Driver	Manufacturer	Model
2022	(Brazil) Juninho Berlanda	(Japan) Toyota	Yaris

=== Super ===
Season	Driver	Manufacturer	Model
2020	(Brazil) Rafael Lopes	(United States) Chevrolet	Onix
2021	(Brazil) Gustavo Magnabosco	(Germany) Volkswagen	Gol
2022	(Brazil) Gustavo Magnabosco	(Germany) Volkswagen	Gol

=== Elite ===
Season	Driver	Manufacturer	Model
2022	(Brazil) Nilton Rossoni / (Brazil) Fabrício Lançoni	(Germany) Volkswagen	Gol

=== A ===
Season	Driver	Manufacturer	Model
2020	(Brazil) Richard Heidrich	(Italy) Fiat	Mobi
2021	(Brazil) Gustavo Dal Pizzol	(United States) Chevrolet	Onix
2022	(Brazil) Henrique Basso	(Germany) Volkswagen	Gol
2023	(Brazil) Juninho Berlanda	(Japan) Toyota	Yaris

=== B ===
Season	Driver	Manufacturer	Model
2021	(Brazil) Glauco Tavares	(Italy) Fiat	Mobi
2022	(Brazil) Ricardo Raimundo	(Italy) Fiat	Uno

=== Senior ===
Season	Driver	Manufacturer	Model
2022	(Brazil) Guto Baldo	(United States) Ford	Ka

== See also ==
1. Stock Car Pro Series
2. Stock Series
3. F4 Brazilian Championship
