= Barrichello =

Barrichello (Italian: [barriˈkɛllo], Brazilian Portuguese: [baʁiˈkɛlu]) is an Italian surname from Veneto, primarily associated with a family of Brazilian racing drivers. Notable people with the surname include:

- Eduardo Barrichello (born 2001), Brazilian racing driver
- Fernando Barrichello (born 2005), Brazilian racing driver
- Rubens Barrichello (born 1972), Brazilian racing driver and broadcaster
