= Levente Révész =

Hungarian racing driver

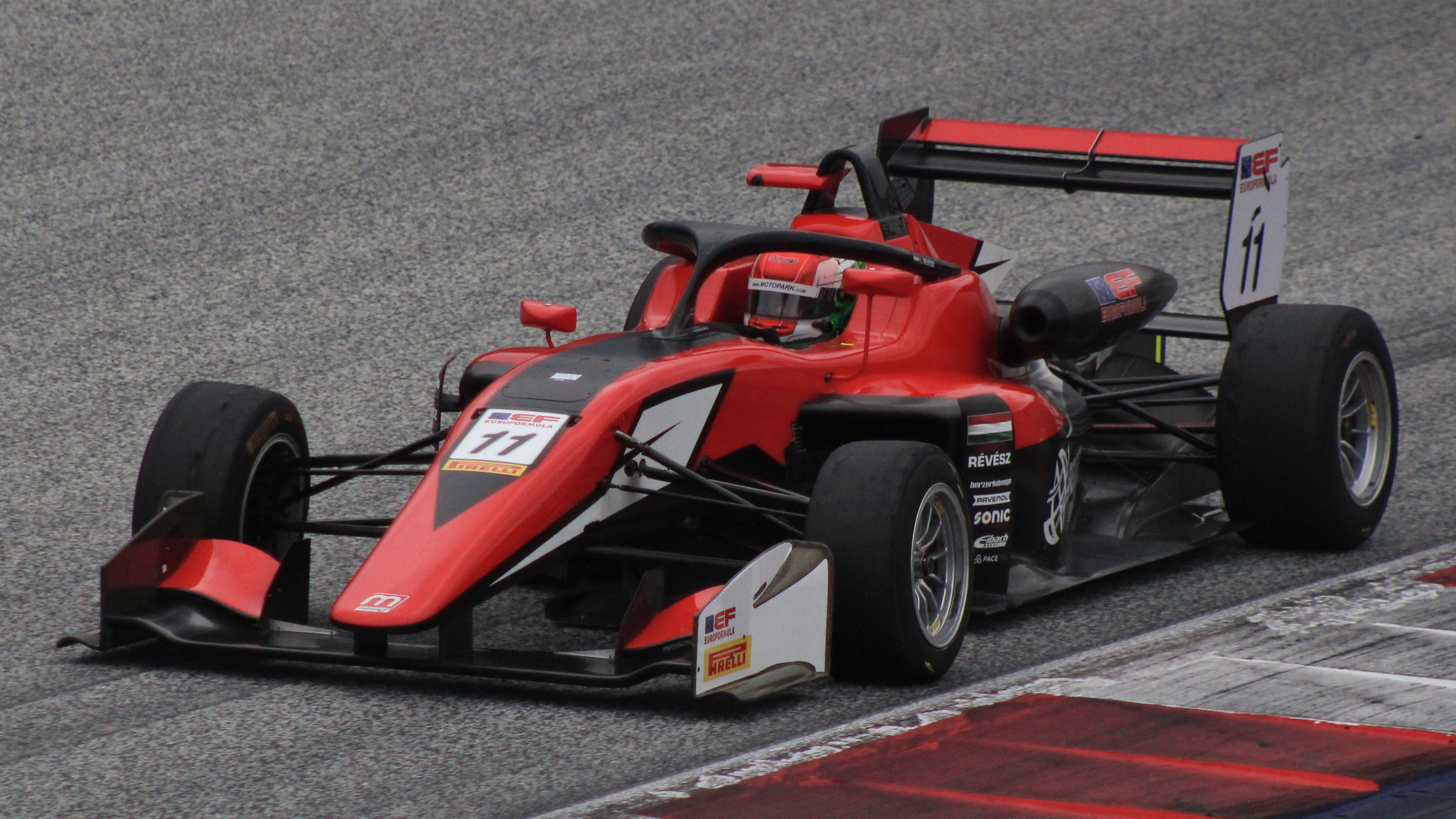
- Révész racing in the 2024 Euroformula Open Championship at the Red Bull Ring.
- Nationality: (Hungary) Hungarian
- Born: 22 March 2005 (age 21) Budapest, Hungary

International GT Open career
- Debut season: 2025
- Current team: Team Motopark
- Car number: 11
- Starts: 14 (14 entries)
- Wins: 4
- Podiums: 7
- Poles: 1
- Fastest laps: 1
- Best finish: 1st in 2025

Previous series
- 2023–24 2022–23 2021 2021: Euroformula Open Championship; FR European Championship; Italian F4 Championship; ADAC Formula 4

Levente Révész (born 22 March 2005) is a Hungarian racing driver who currently competes for Motopark in the GT World Challenge Europe Endurance Cup. He is the 2025 International GT Open champion.

== Career ==
=== Formula 4 ===
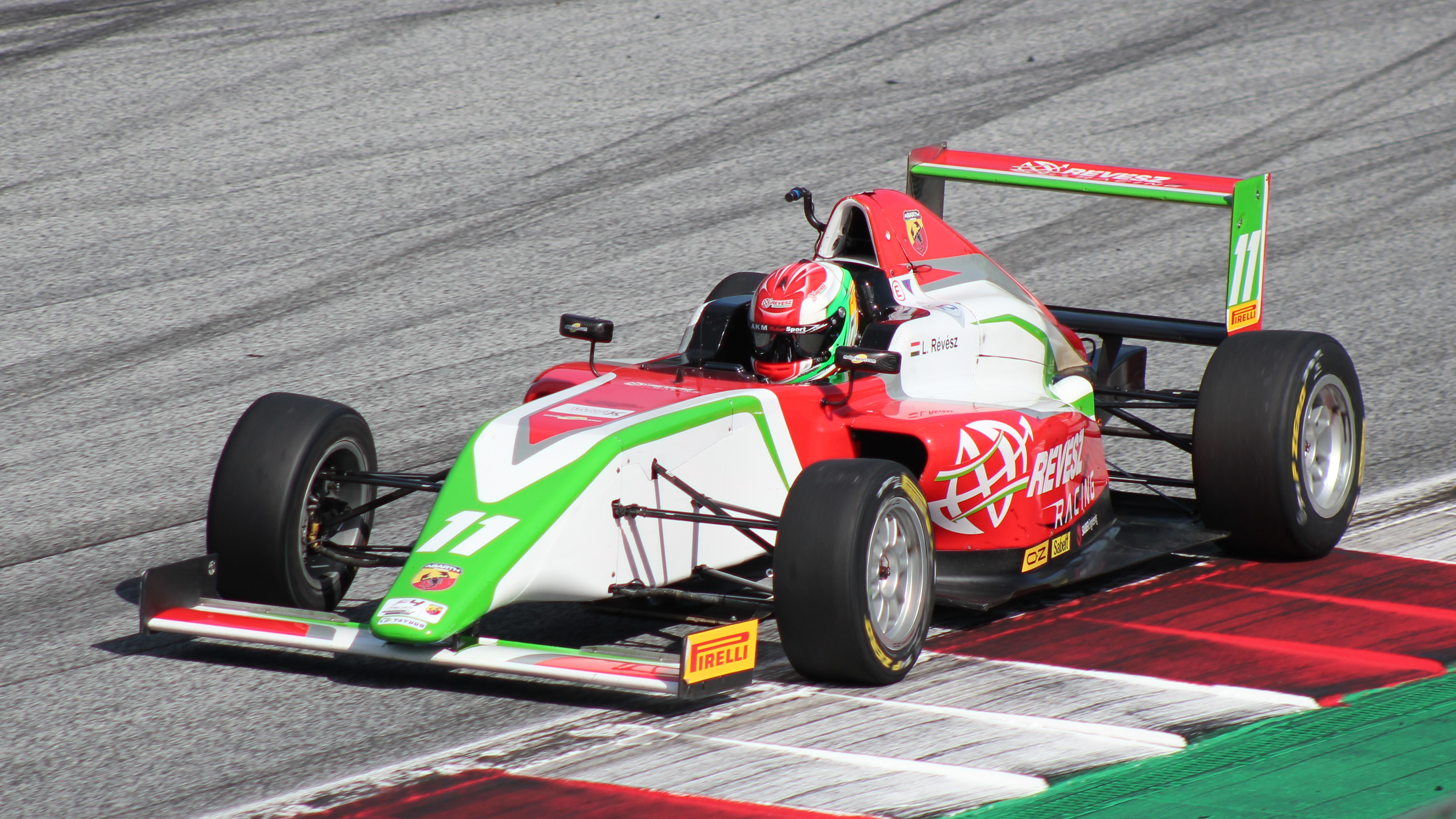
Révész racing in the 2021 Italian F4 Championship at the Red Bull Ring.

In 2021, Révész made his single-seater debut in the Italian F4 Championship for AKM Motorsport. He finished the season in 31st after securing his only points finish at the Vallelunga Circuit.

Révész also joined R-ace GP as a guest driver in two rounds of the ADAC Formula 4 Championship.

=== Formula Regional ===
==== 2022 ====
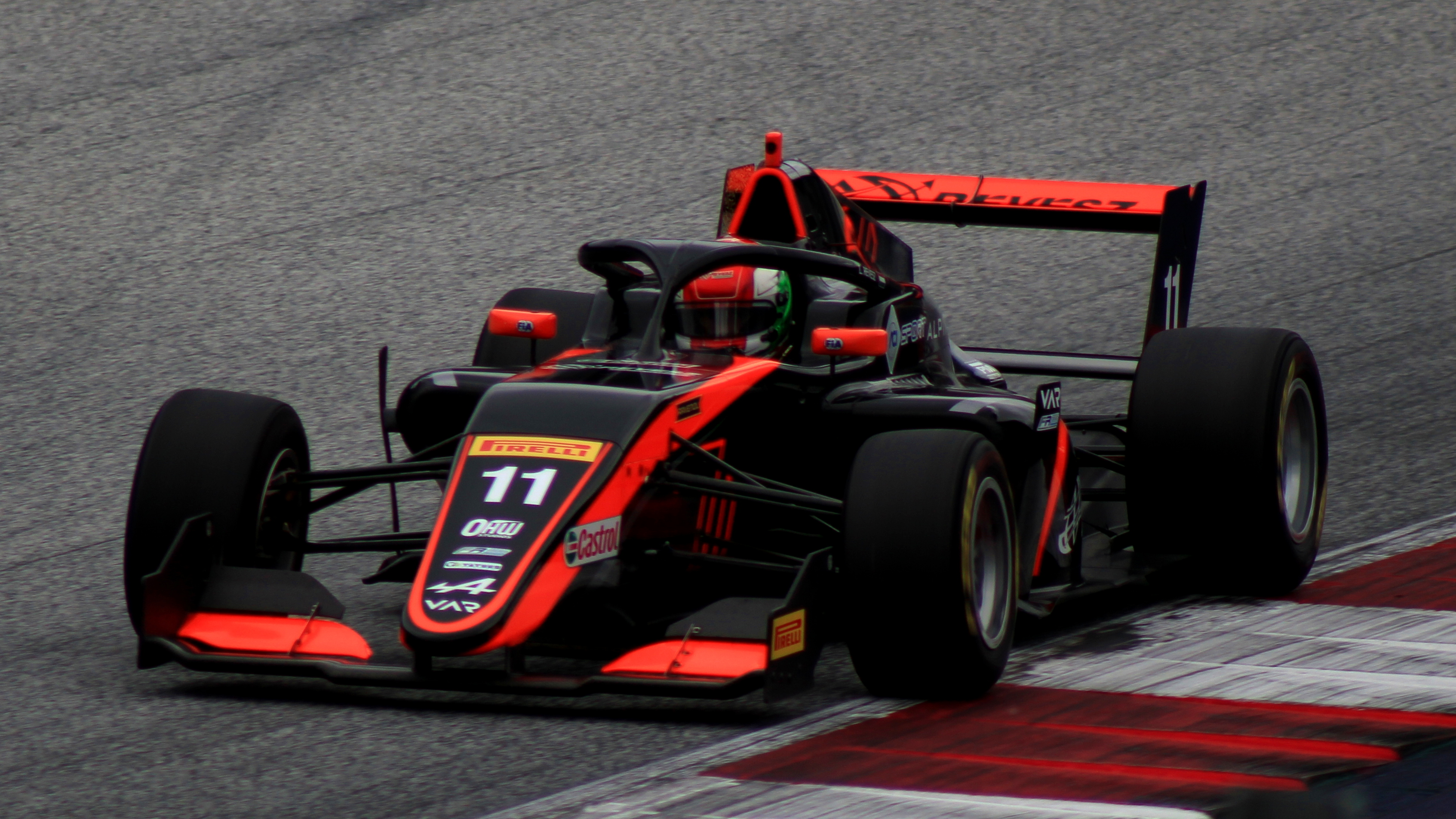
Révész racing in the 2022 Formula Regional European Championship at the Red Bull Ring.

In 2022, Révész joined the Evans GP Academy to compete in the Formula Regional Asian Championship. He finished the season in 23rd.

Révész then joined Van Amersfoort Racing to compete in the Formula Regional European Championship. He didn't score any points and finished the season in 28th.

==== 2023 ====
At the start of 2023, Révész competed in the Formula Regional Middle East Championship with R-ace GP. He finished the season in 25th. Révész then returned to FRECA, driving for Arden Motorsport. He scored his first points in the series at Mugello, finishing tenth, before finishing tenth again in Monza due to multiple penalties ahead of him. Révész did not contest the final two rounds, leaving him 25th in the drivers' standings.

=== Euroformula Open ===
A week after his final FRECA start, Révész joined Team Motopark in the Euroformula Open Championship. At his debut round in Monza, he inherited third in race 2 from the limping car of Cian Shields and finished third again in race 3 in a photo finish. He failed to finish on the podium in Mugello, but achieved his first win in car racing at the season finale in Barcelona, passing reversed grid polesitter Jakob Bergmeister at the start and holding off Charlie Wurz in the latter stages. Révész finished ninth in the championship despite only contesting three rounds.

In 2024, Révész remained in Euroformula Open and returned to Motopark. He missed out on a podium in the opening round, finishing narrowly behind Francesco Simonazzi before receiving a track limits penalty in race 2. In race 3, a smoking car forced his retirement. Révész took two podiums at Hockenheim, second in race 1 and third in race 3. He then battled for the lead in race 1 at Spa, but eventually fell to third. Révész started from reversed grid pole for race 3, but spun off in wet conditions and finished fifth. Another third place followed at the Hungaroring, though the weekend was plagued by incidents: Révész retired in the pits during race 2 after being hit from behind by Fernando Barrichello, before breaking his front wing in a battle for the lead with Bergmeister during race 3; the Hungarian finished fifth. In Le Castellet, Révész charged to second during race 1 and took the same result in race 2. Révész took the lead from the start of race 3 and maintained it until the flag. At the Red Bull Ring, Révész scored another third place in race 1, then scored finishes of fourth and seventh in the remaining races. He left the series with two rounds to go, but still finished fifth overall owing to the depleted grid.

=== International GT Open ===
Having made his GT racing debut in the Middle East Trophy at the start of 2025, Révész joined Motopark to drive a Mercedes-AMG GT3 Evo in the International GT Open series during the 2025 season. The season began with success at Portimão, as Révész and teammate Matteo Cairoli won race 2, following a fourth place in race 1 where Révész finished third on track but was penalised for hitting Anthony Bartone. Following a mechanical issue for the leading Greystone McLaren at the Spa endurance race, Révész and new teammate Maximilian Götz built up a dominant gap and won the GT Open 500. After finishing sixth in race 1 at Hockenheim, Révész and Götz took home third in a rainy race 2. These results were copied at his home race in Budapest, where Révész was joined by Philip Ellis. Paired with Götz for the Le Castellet round, Révész regained the championship lead by passing Bartone for the win in race 1. The pair then finished tenth on Sunday. In Austria, Révész and Götz followed 12th on Saturday — a race where they suffered a lap 1 puncture — up with fifth on Sunday, allowing the Hungarian to retain his points lead. During the first race at Barcelona, Götz ran second in the opening stint; a quicker pit stop phase allowed Révész to take the lead and eventually win in controlling fashion. They finished eighth in race 2, teeing up a title decider in Monza.

== Karting record ==
=== Karting career summary ===
Season	Series	Team	Position
2018	CIK-FIA European Championship — OKJ	Lennox Racing Team	67th
2019	WSK Champions Cup — OKJ	Top Motorsport	24th
2019	South Garda Winter Cup — OKJ	Lennox Racing Team	27th
2019	WSK Super Master Series — OKJ	Lennox Racing Team	NC
2019	WSK Euro Series — OKJ	Lennox Racing Team	21st
2019	WSK Open Cup — OK	KR Motorsport	20th
2019	German Karting Championship — Junior	KR Motorsport	4th
2019	CIK-FIA European Championship — OKJ	KR Motorsport	49th
2019	CIK-FIA World Championship — OKJ	KR Motorsport	18th
2020	SKUSA Winter Series — X30 Senior		NC
2020	South Garda Winter Cup — OK	KR Motorsport	NC
2020	WSK Champions Cup — OK	KR Motorsport	10th
2020	WSK Open Cup — OK	KR Motorsport	10th
2020	WSK Super Master Series — OK	KR Motorsport	24th
2020	WSK Euro Series — OK	KR Motorsport	13th
2020	CIK-FIA European Championship — OK	KR Motorsport	30th
2020	CIK-FIA World Championship — OK	KR Motorsport	NC

== Racing record ==
=== Racing career summary ===
Season	Series	Team	Races	Wins	Poles	F/Laps	Podiums	Points	Position
2021	Italian F4 Championship	AKM Motorsport	21	0	0	0	0	2	31st
2021	FIA Central European Zone Formula 4	AKM Motorsport	2	0	?	?	0	1	15th
2021	ADAC Formula 4 Championship	R-ace GP	6	0	0	0	0	0	NC†
2022	Formula Regional Asian Championship	Evans GP Academy	15	0	0	0	0	2	23rd
2022	Formula Regional European Championship	Van Amersfoort Racing	19	0	0	0	0	0	28th
2023	Formula Regional Middle East Championship	R-ace GP	15	0	0	0	0	9	25th
2023	Formula Regional European Championship	Arden Motorsport	16	0	0	0	0	2	25th
2023	Euroformula Open Championship	Team Motopark	8	1	0	0	3	103	9th
2024	Euroformula Open Championship	Team Motopark	18	1	0	2	8	236	5th
2025	Middle East Trophy - GT3	Team Motopark	2	0	0	0	0	14	9th
2025	International GT Open	Team Motopark	14	4	1	1	7	142	**1st**
2026	GT World Challenge Europe Endurance Cup	Team Motopark	1	0	0	0	0	0	NC

^{†} As Révész was a guest driver, he was ineligible to score points.
* Season still in progress.

=== Complete Italian F4 Championship results ===
(key) (Races in bold indicate pole position) (Races in italics indicate fastest lap)

Year	Team	1	2	3	4	5	6	7	8	9	10	11	12	13	14	15	16	17	18	19	20	21	DC	Points
2021	AKM Motorsport	LEC; 1; 28	LEC; 2; 20	LEC; 3 Ret	MIS; 1; 20	MIS; 2 Ret	MIS; 3; 19	VLL; 1; 21	VLL; 2; 9	VLL; 3; 13	IMO; 1; 15	IMO; 2; 19	IMO; 3; 20	RBR; 1; 23	RBR; 2; 20	RBR; 3; 14	MUG; 1 Ret	MUG; 2; 12	MUG; 3; 14	MNZ; 1; 29†	MNZ; 2; 22	MNZ; 3; 28†	31st	2

=== Complete Formula Regional Asian Championship results ===
(key) (Races in bold indicate pole position) (Races in italics indicate the fastest lap of top ten finishers)

Year	Entrant	1	2	3	4	5	6	7	8	9	10	11	12	13	14	15	DC	Points
2022	Evans GP Academy	ABU; 1; 13	ABU; 2; 9	ABU; 3; 12	DUB; 1; 18	DUB; 2; 14	DUB; 3; 13	DUB; 1; 15	DUB; 2; 13	DUB; 3 Ret	DUB; 1; 18	DUB; 2; 21	DUB; 3; 17	ABU; 1; 20	ABU; 2; 14	ABU; 3; 14	23rd	2

=== Complete Formula Regional European Championship results ===
(key) (Races in bold indicate pole position) (Races in italics indicate fastest lap)

Year	Team	1	2	3	4	5	6	7	8	9	10	11	12	13	14	15	16	17	18	19	20	DC	Points
2022	Van Amersfoort Racing	MNZ; 1; 23	MNZ; 2; 27	IMO; 1; 17	IMO; 2; 22	MCO; 1; 22	MCO; 2 DNQ	LEC; 1; 25	LEC; 2 Ret	ZAN; 1; 21	ZAN; 2; 24	HUN; 1; 22	HUN; 2; 19	SPA; 1; 28	SPA; 2; 20	RBR; 1; 21	RBR; 2; 18	CAT; 1; 14	CAT; 2; 30	MUG; 1; 25	MUG; 2 Ret	28th	0
2023	Arden Motorsport	IMO; 1; 24	IMO; 2; 11	CAT; 1; 21	CAT; 2; 27	HUN; 1; 16	HUN; 2; 15	SPA; 1; 22	SPA; 2; 26	MUG; 1 Ret	MUG; 2; 10	LEC; 1; 25	LEC; 2 Ret	RBR; 1; 25	RBR; 2; 18	MNZ; 1; 10	MNZ; 2; 23	ZAN; 1	ZAN; 2	HOC; 1	HOC; 2	25th	2

=== Complete Euroformula Open Championship results ===
(key) (Races in bold indicate pole position) (Races in italics indicate fastest lap)

Year	Team	1	2	3	4	5	6	7	8	9	10	11	12	13	14	15	16	17	18	19	20	21	22	23	24	Pos	Points
2023	Team Motopark	PRT; 1	PRT; 2	PRT; 3	SPA; 1	SPA; 2	SPA; 3	HUN; 1	HUN; 2	HUN; 3	LEC; 1	LEC; 2	LEC; 3	RBR; 1	RBR; 2	RBR; 3	MNZ; 1; 5	MNZ; 2; 3	MNZ; 3; 3	MUG; 1; 6	MUG; 2; 4	CAT; 1; 5	CAT; 2; 1	CAT; 3; 7		9th	103
2024	Team Motopark	PRT; 1; 4	PRT; 2; 4	PRT; 3 Ret	HOC; 1; 2	HOC; 2; 4	HOC; 3; 3*	SPA; 1; 3	SPA; 2; 4	SPA; 3; 5	HUN; 1; 3*	HUN; 2; 6	HUN; 3; 5	LEC; 1; 2*	LEC; 2; 2	LEC; 3; 1	RBR; 1; 3*	RBR; 2; 4	RBR; 3; 7	CAT; 1	CAT; 2	CAT; 3	MNZ; 1	MNZ; 2	MNZ; 3	5th	236

=== Complete International GT Open results ===
(key) (Races in bold indicate pole position) (Races in italics indicate fastest lap)

Year	Team	Car	Class	1	2	3	4	5	6	7	8	9	10	11	12	13	14	Pos.	Points
2025	Team Motopark	Mercedes-AMG GT3 Evo	Pro	ALG; 1; 4	ALG; 2; 1	SPA; 1	HOC; 1; 6	HOC; 2; 3	HUN; 1; 6	HUN; 2; 3	LEC; 1; 1	LEC; 2; 10	RBR; 1; 12	RBR; 2; 5	CAT; 1; 1	CAT; 2; 8	**MNZ**; 3	1st	142
