= 2020 ADAC Formula 4 Championship =

Motor racing championship

The 2020 ADAC Formula 4 Championship was the sixth season of the ADAC Formula 4, an open-wheel motor racing series. It was a multi-event motor racing championship that featured drivers competing in 1.4 litre Tatuus-Abarth single seat race cars that conformed to the technical regulations for the championship. The season was won by Red Bull junior Jonny Edgar.

== Teams and drivers ==
Team	No.	Driver	Class	Rounds
(France) R-ace GP	3	(Israel) Roee Meyuhas		5–7
(France) R-ace GP	4	(France) Victor Bernier		All
(France) R-ace GP	5	(Russia) Artem Lobanenko		1–2, 4
(France) R-ace GP	6	(Russia) Kirill Smal	R	All
(Germany) ADAC Berlin-Brandenburg	7	(Czech Republic) Josef Knopp	R	All
(Germany) ADAC Berlin-Brandenburg	23	(Mexico) Erick Zúñiga	R	3–7
(Germany) ADAC Berlin-Brandenburg	29	(Germany) Joshua Dürksen (Note: Dürksen is a Paraguayan driver who entered under German racing license.)		All
(Italy) Prema Powerteam	15	(Colombia) Sebastián Montoya	R	2–3
(Italy) Prema Powerteam	16	(Sweden) Dino Beganovic	R	2–3
(Italy) Prema Powerteam	46	(Italy) Gabriele Minì	R	2–3
(Netherlands) Van Amersfoort Racing	17	(United Kingdom) Jonny Edgar		All
(Netherlands) Van Amersfoort Racing	18	(China) Cenyu Han	R	6–7
(Netherlands) Van Amersfoort Racing	51	(Italy) Francesco Pizzi	R	2–4
(Netherlands) Van Amersfoort Racing	52	(United States) Jak Crawford		All
(Germany) US Racing	58	(Finland) Elias Seppänen		All
(Germany) US Racing	77	(Germany) Tim Tramnitz	R	All
(Germany) US Racing	87	(United Kingdom) Oliver Bearman	R	All
(Germany) US Racing	95	(Russia) Vladislav Lomko	R	All
(Italy) Iron Lynx	72	(Italy) Leonardo Fornaroli	R G	3
(Italy) Iron Lynx	78	(United Arab Emirates) Hamda Al Qubaisi	G	3

Icon	Legend
R	Rookie
G	Guest drivers ineligible to score points

== Race calendar and results ==
The initial calendar was released on 10 January 2020. On 10 April 2020 the series announced a revised calendar, delaying the start of the season due to the 2019-20 coronavirus pandemic. The second Nürburgring event supported the 2020 24 Hours of Nürburgring, while the other rounds supported the 2020 ADAC GT Masters. Another altered 7-round calendar was released on 24 May 2020. The sixth race weekend of the season was moved from Circuit Zandvoort to Lausitzring due to the high number of infections in the Netherlands and the classification as a risk area by the German government.

Round		Circuit	Date	Pole position	Fastest lap	Winning driver	Winning team	Rookie winner
1	R1	(Germany) Lausitzring, Klettwitz (DTM Circuit)	1 August	(United States) Jak Crawford	(United Kingdom) Jonny Edgar	(United Kingdom) Jonny Edgar	(Netherlands) Van Amersfoort Racing	(Germany) Tim Tramnitz
1	R2	(Germany) Lausitzring, Klettwitz (DTM Circuit)	2 August	(United States) Jak Crawford	(United Kingdom) Jonny Edgar	(United Kingdom) Jonny Edgar	(Netherlands) Van Amersfoort Racing	(Germany) Tim Tramnitz
1	R3	(Germany) Lausitzring, Klettwitz (DTM Circuit)	2 August		(Russia) Vladislav Lomko	(Finland) Elias Seppänen	(Germany) US Racing	(Russia) Kirill Smal
2	R1	(Germany) Nürburgring, Nürburg (Sprint Circuit)	15 August	(Italy) Gabriele Minì	(United Kingdom) Jonny Edgar	(Italy) Gabriele Minì	(Italy) Prema Powerteam	(Italy) Gabriele Minì
2	R2	(Germany) Nürburgring, Nürburg (Sprint Circuit)	15 August	(United Kingdom) Jonny Edgar	(United Kingdom) Jonny Edgar	(United Kingdom) Jonny Edgar	(Netherlands) Van Amersfoort Racing	(Italy) Gabriele Minì
2	R3	(Germany) Nürburgring, Nürburg (Sprint Circuit)	16 August		(Italy) Gabriele Minì	(Germany) Joshua Dürksen	(Germany) ADAC Berlin-Brandenburg	(Italy) Gabriele Minì
3	R1	(Germany) Hockenheimring, Hockenheim	19 September	(Germany) Joshua Dürksen	(United States) Jak Crawford	(Germany) Joshua Dürksen	(Germany) ADAC Berlin-Brandenburg	(Italy) Francesco Pizzi
3	R2	(Germany) Hockenheimring, Hockenheim	19 September	(Italy) Gabriele Minì	(Italy) Gabriele Minì	(United Kingdom) Oliver Bearman	(Germany) US Racing	(United Kingdom) Oliver Bearman
3	R3	(Germany) Hockenheimring, Hockenheim	20 September		(Colombia) Sebastián Montoya	(France) Victor Bernier	(France) R-ace GP	(Italy) Gabriele Minì
4	R1	(Germany) Nürburgring, Nürburg (Oldtimer Circuit)	25 September	(United States) Jak Crawford	(Germany) Joshua Dürksen	(United States) Jak Crawford	(Netherlands) Van Amersfoort Racing	(Germany) Tim Tramnitz
4	R2	(Germany) Nürburgring, Nürburg (Oldtimer Circuit)	26 September	(United Kingdom) Jonny Edgar	(United States) Jak Crawford	(United Kingdom) Jonny Edgar	(Netherlands) Van Amersfoort Racing	(United Kingdom) Oliver Bearman
4	R3	(Germany) Nürburgring, Nürburg (Oldtimer Circuit)	26 September		(Russia) Vladislav Lomko	(Russia) Vladislav Lomko	(Germany) US Racing	(Russia) Vladislav Lomko
5	R1	(Austria) Red Bull Ring, Spielberg	17 October	(United Kingdom) Jonny Edgar	(France) Victor Bernier	(United Kingdom) Jonny Edgar	(Netherlands) Van Amersfoort Racing	(Germany) Tim Tramnitz
5	R2	(Austria) Red Bull Ring, Spielberg	18 October	(United Kingdom) Jonny Edgar	(United States) Jak Crawford	(United Kingdom) Jonny Edgar	(Netherlands) Van Amersfoort Racing	(Russia) Kirill Smal
5	R3	(Austria) Red Bull Ring, Spielberg	18 October		(France) Victor Bernier	(United States) Jak Crawford	(Netherlands) Van Amersfoort Racing	(Russia) Vladislav Lomko
6	R1	(Germany) Lausitzring, Klettwitz (Grand Prix Circuit)	31 October	(Finland) Elias Seppänen	(France) Victor Bernier	(Russia) Vladislav Lomko	(Germany) US Racing	(Russia) Vladislav Lomko
6	R2	(Germany) Lausitzring, Klettwitz (Grand Prix Circuit)	1 November	(Russia) Kirill Smal	(United Kingdom) Oliver Bearman	(United States) Jak Crawford	(Netherlands) Van Amersfoort Racing	(Germany) Tim Tramnitz
6	R3	(Germany) Lausitzring, Klettwitz (Grand Prix Circuit)	1 November		(United States) Jak Crawford	(France) Victor Bernier	(France) R-ace GP	(Germany) Tim Tramnitz
7	R1	(Germany) Motorsport Arena Oschersleben, Oschersleben	7 November	(United Kingdom) Jonny Edgar	(United States) Jak Crawford	(United States) Jak Crawford	(Netherlands) Van Amersfoort Racing	(Germany) Tim Tramnitz
7	R2	(Germany) Motorsport Arena Oschersleben, Oschersleben	8 November	(United States) Jak Crawford	(United Kingdom) Jonny Edgar	(United States) Jak Crawford	(Netherlands) Van Amersfoort Racing	(United Kingdom) Oliver Bearman
7	R3	(Germany) Motorsport Arena Oschersleben, Oschersleben	8 November		(United Kingdom) Jonny Edgar	(Germany) Tim Tramnitz	(Germany) US Racing	(Germany) Tim Tramnitz

== Championship standings ==
Points were awarded to the top 10 classified finishers in each race. No points were awarded for pole position or fastest lap. The final classification was obtained by summing up the scores on the 19 best results, including disqualifications mandatorily, obtained during the races held.

Position	**1st**	**2nd**	**3rd**	**4th**	**5th**	**6th**	**7th**	**8th**	**9th**	**10th**
Points	25	18	15	12	10	8	6	4	2	1

=== Drivers' Championship ===
Pos	Driver	LAU1 (Germany)			NÜR1 (Germany)			HOC (Germany)			NÜR2 (Germany)			RBR (Austria)			LAU2 (Germany)			OSC (Germany)			Pts
Pos	Driver	R1	R2	R3	R1	R2	R3	R1	R2	R3	R1	R2	R3	R1	R2	R3	R1	R2	R3	R1	R2	R3	Pts
1	(United Kingdom) Jonny Edgar	1	1	7	2	**1**	5	3	4	17	3	**1**	6	**1**	**1**	7	7	7	4	**12**	2	2	300
2	(United States) Jak Crawford	**4**	**2**	10	10	4	2	2	8	2	**1**	4	3	3	2	1	8	1	Ret	1	**1**	6	298
3	(Finland) Elias Seppänen	3	8	1	3	2	4	4	6	3	Ret	2	5	4	4	2	**3**	Ret	6	3	5	3	257
4	(Germany) Tim Tramnitz	5	3	5	7	5	6	6	2	7	4	5	2	5	11	5	9	2	2	5	8	1	226
5	(France) Victor Bernier	7	4	2	4	9	7	Ret	5	1	7	11	11	2	5	3	2	5	1	4	6	4	225
6	(Germany) Joshua Dürksen	2	11	9	9	6	1	**1**	11	5	2	9	Ret	9	3	12	4	4	7	2	7	5	191
7	(United Kingdom) Oliver Bearman	10	7	6	13	7	10	Ret	1	8	6	3	4	6	10	8	5	6	Ret	7	3	7	144
8	(Russia) Vladislav Lomko	6	6	Ret	6	15	DSQ	8	10	11	8	8	1	7	7	4	1	Ret	10	6	4	10	133
9	(Russia) Kirill Smal	11	5	3	12	12	DNS	12	14	15	12†	10	7	11	6	6	6	**3**	3	9	13†	9	91
10	(Italy) Gabriele Minì				**1**	3	3	Ret	**3**	4													82
11	(Italy) Francesco Pizzi				5	14	9	5	7	6	5	6	Ret										54
12	(Czech Republic) Josef Knopp	8	10	8	11	10	13	14	15	10	9	13	8	8	Ret	9	11	10	9	8	9	12	32
13	(Russia) Artem Lobanenko	9	9	4	Ret	13	12				11	7	9										24
14	(Israel) Roee Meyuhas													10	9	11	10	8	5	10	10	Ret	20
15	(Mexico) Erick Zúñiga							9	12	13	10	12	10	12	8	10	12	9	8	Ret	12	8	19
16	(Sweden) Dino Beganovic				Ret	11	8	7	9	16													12
17	(Colombia) Sebastián Montoya				8	8	11	13	Ret	9													10
18	(China) Cenyu Han																13	11	11	11	11	11	0
Guest drivers ineligible to score points
	(United Arab Emirates) Hamda Al Qubaisi							10	16	14													
	(Italy) Leonardo Fornaroli							11	13	12													
Pos	Driver	R1	R2	R3	R1	R2	R3	R1	R2	R3	R1	R2	R3	R1	R2	R3	R1	R2	R3	R1	R2	R3	Pts
Pos	Driver	LAU1 (Germany)			NÜR1 (Germany)			HOC (Germany)			NÜR2 (Germany)			RBR (Austria)			LAU2 (Germany)			OSC (Germany)			Pts

Colour	Result
Gold	Winner
Silver	Second place
Bronze	Third place
Green	Points classification
Blue	Non-points classification
Blue	Non-classified finish (NC)
Purple	Retired, not classified (Ret)
Red	Did not qualify (DNQ)
Red	Did not pre-qualify (DNPQ)
Black	Disqualified (DSQ)
White	Did not start (DNS)
White	Withdrew (WD)
White	Race cancelled (C)
Blank	Did not practice (DNP)
Blank	Did not arrive (DNA)
Blank	Excluded (EX)

**Bold** – Pole
Italics – Fastest Lap
† — Did not finish, but classified

=== Rookie Championship ===
Pos	Driver	LAU1 (Germany)			NÜR1 (Germany)			HOC (Germany)			NÜR2 (Germany)			RBR (Austria)			LAU2 (Germany)			OSC (Germany)			Pts
Pos	Driver	R1	R2	R3	R1	R2	R3	R1	R2	R3	R1	R2	R3	R1	R2	R3	R1	R2	R3	R1	R2	R3	Pts
1	(Germany) Tim Tramnitz	5	3	5	7	5	6	6	2	7	4	5	2	5	11	5	9	2	2	5	8	1	408
2	(United Kingdom) Oliver Bearman	10	7	6	13	7	10	Ret	1	8	6	3	4	6	10	8	5	6	Ret	7	3	7	293
3	(Russia) Vladislav Lomko	6	6	Ret	6	15	DSQ	8	10	11	8	8	1	7	7	4	1	Ret	10	6	4	10	264
4	(Russia) Kirill Smal	11	5	3	12	12	DNS	12	14	15	12†	10	7	11	6	6	6	3	3	9	13†	9	236
5	(Czech Republic) Josef Knopp	8	10	8	11	10	13	14	15	10	9	13	8	8	Ret	9	11	10	9	8	9	12	185
6	(Mexico) Erick Zúñiga							9	12	13	10	12	10	12	8	10	12	9	8	Ret	12	8	133
7	(Italy) Francesco Pizzi				5	14	9	5	7	6	5	6	Ret										122
8	(Italy) Gabriele Minì				1	3	3	Ret	3	4													115
9	(Sweden) Dino Beganovic				Ret	11	8	7	9	16													49
10	(China) Cenyu Han																13	11	11	11	11	11	48
11	(Colombia) Sebastián Montoya				8	8	11	13	Ret	9													46
Guest drivers ineligible to score points
	(Italy) Leonardo Fornaroli							11	13	12													
Pos	Driver	R1	R2	R3	R1	R2	R3	R1	R2	R3	R1	R2	R3	R1	R2	R3	R1	R2	R3	R1	R2	R3	Pts
Pos	Driver	LAU1 (Germany)			NÜR1 (Germany)			HOC (Germany)			NÜR2 (Germany)			RBR (Austria)			LAU2 (Germany)			OSC (Germany)			Pts

=== Teams' Cup ===
Pos	Team	Points
1	(Netherlands) Van Amersfoort Racing	651
2	(Germany) US Racing	514
3	(France) R-ace GP	416
4	(Germany) ADAC Berlin-Brandenburg	353
5	(Italy) Prema Theodore Racing	104
6	(Italy) Iron Lynx	0
