= 2024 Euroformula Open Championship =

2024 formula racing championship

The 2024 Euroformula Open Championship was a multi-event motor racing championship for single-seater open wheel formula racing cars held across Europe. The championship featured drivers competing in Euroformula Open Championship specification Dallara 320 chassis cars. It was the eleventh Euroformula Open Championship season. The season consisted of eight race weekends with three races each. It started in late April and spanned until October.

Brad Benavides, a returnee to the series after last competing there in 2021, won the Drivers' Championship with three races to spare, while his teammate Fernando Barrichello won the Rookie Championship at the first race of round 5 after being the only rookie competitor for the first four rounds. Their team, Team Motopark, the only multi-car team, clinched the Teams' Championship at the third race of the same round.

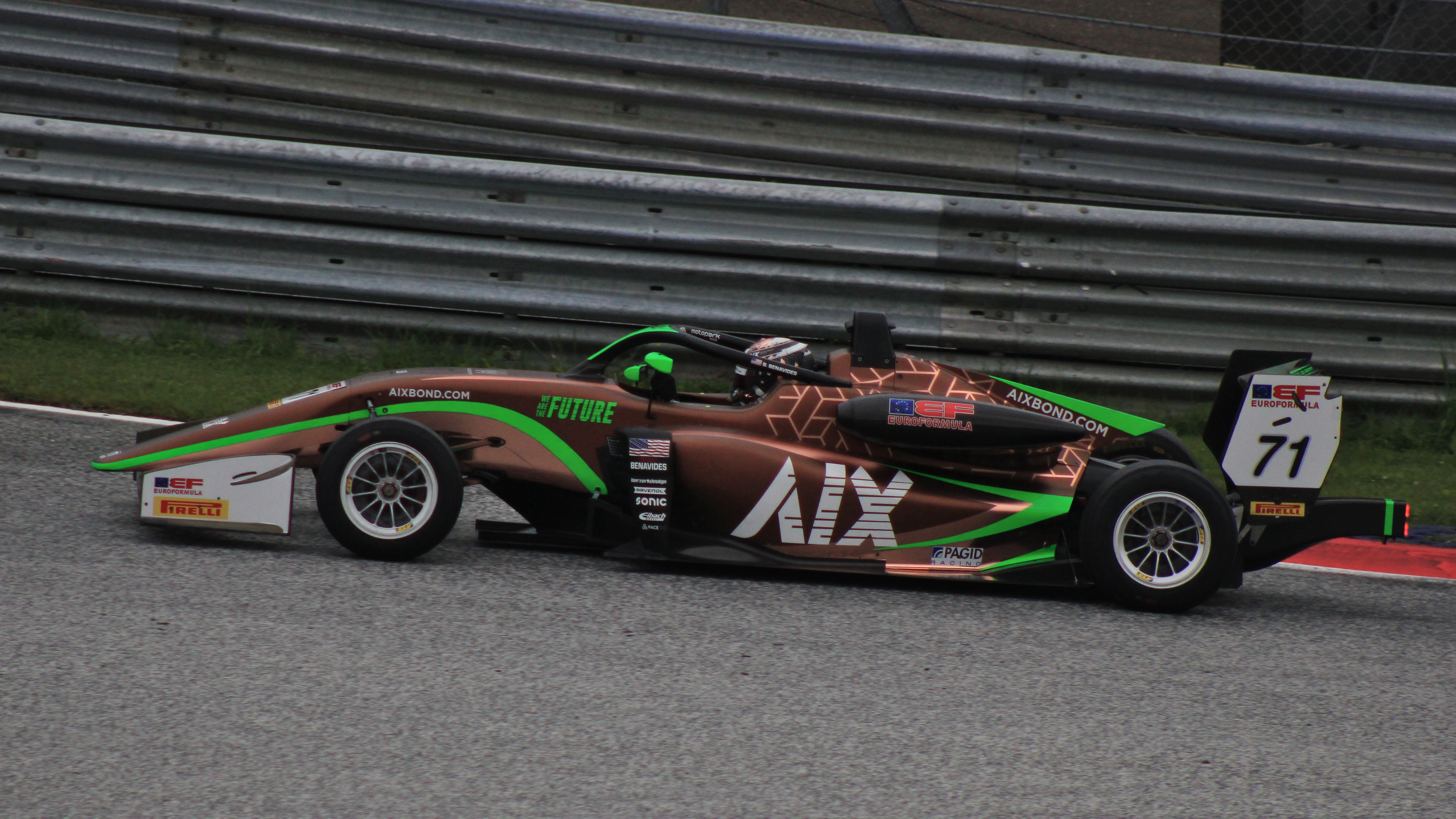
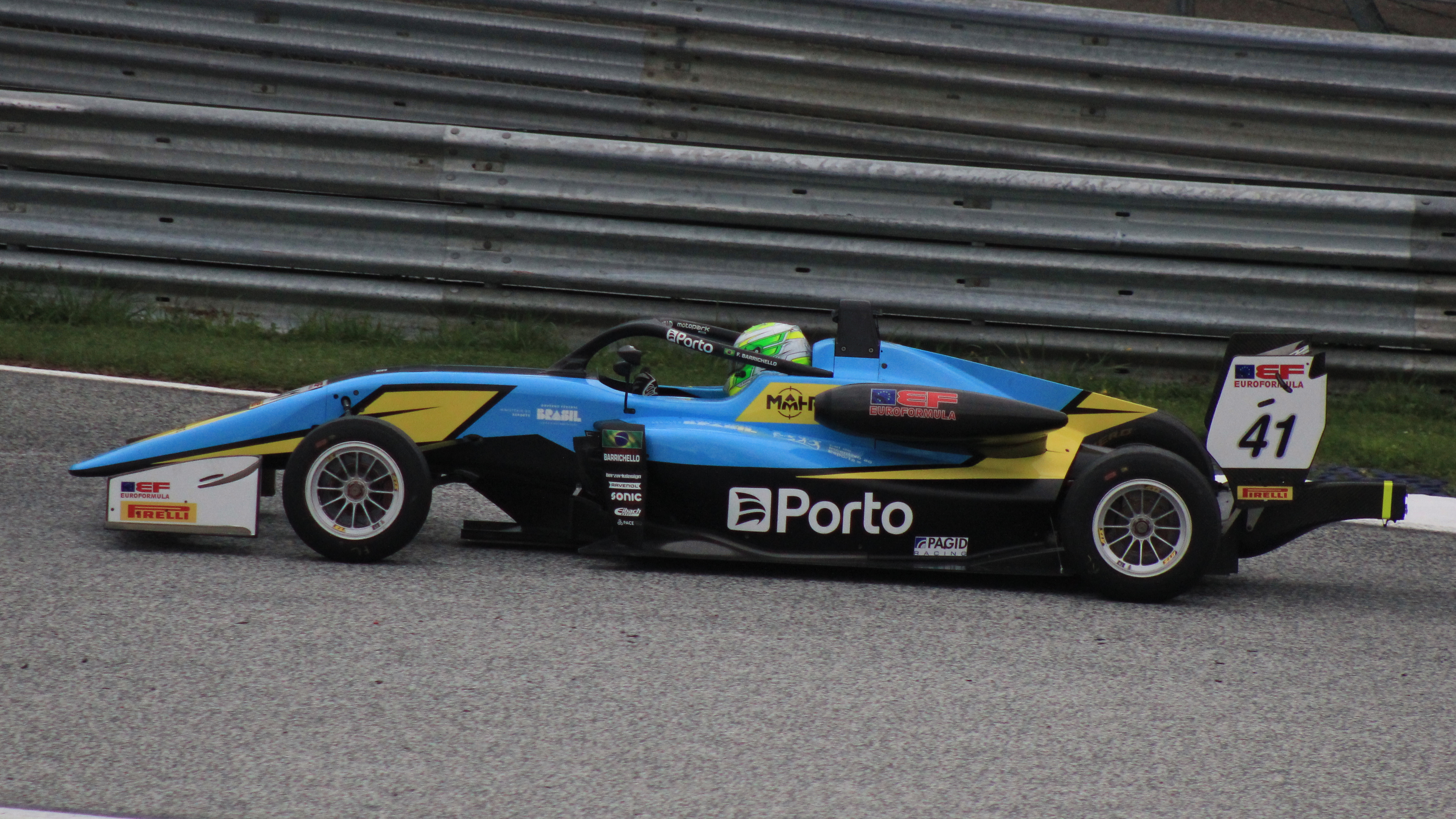
Brad Benavides (top) and Fernando Barrichello (bottom), both driving for Team Motopark, became Drivers' Champion and Rookie Champion, respectively.

== Teams and drivers ==
All teams utilized the Dallara 320 chassis.

Team	Engine	No.	Driver	Status	Rounds
(Germany) Team Motopark	Volkswagen	4	(China) Cenyu Han		1
(Germany) Team Motopark	Volkswagen	7	(Spain) Lorenzo Fluxá		1
(Germany) Team Motopark	Volkswagen	11	(Hungary) Levente Révész		1–6
(Germany) Team Motopark	Volkswagen	11	(Mexico) Ricardo Escotto	R	7
(Germany) Team Motopark	Volkswagen	21	(Sri Lanka) Yevan David	R G	8
(Germany) Team Motopark	Volkswagen	23	(South Korea) Michael Shin		2–4, 6
(Germany) Team Motopark	Volkswagen	26	(Germany) Jakob Bergmeister		1–5, 8
(Germany) Team Motopark	Volkswagen	37	Vladislav Ryabov (Note: Ryabov is Russian, but he competed as a neutral competitor as Russian national emblems were banned by the FIA following the Russian invasion of Ukraine.)	R	7–8
(Germany) Team Motopark	Volkswagen	39	(Hong Kong) Gerrard Xie		3
(Germany) Team Motopark	Volkswagen	41	(Brazil) Fernando Barrichello	R	All
(Germany) Team Motopark	Volkswagen	66	(Luxembourg) Enzo Richer	R	5
(Germany) Team Motopark	Volkswagen	71	(United States) Brad Benavides		All
(Germany) Team Motopark	Volkswagen	95	(United Kingdom) Edward Pearson		6–7
(Germany) Team Motopark	Volkswagen	99	(Mexico) José Garfias		6–8
(Czech Republic) STKMělník	Mercedes-Benz	65	(Czech Republic) Roman Roubíček	G	6
(Czech Republic) STKMělník	Mercedes-Benz	65	(Czech Republic) Roman Roubíček	G G	8
(Italy) BVM Racing	Volkswagen	84	(Italy) Francesco Simonazzi		All
(Serbia) NV Racing	Volkswagen	212	(Serbia) Paolo Brajnik	G	All

== Race calendar ==
A provisional seven-round calendar with an eighth event yet to be confirmed was announced on 24 August 2023. In September 2023, the eighth round was confirmed to be held at the Hockenheimring for the first time since 2019. This schedule saw the round at Mugello leave the calendar.

Round		Circuit	Date	Support bill	Map of circuit locations
1	R1	(Portugal) Algarve International Circuit, Portimão	27 April	International GT Open; GT Cup Open Europe; Renault Clio Cup Europe; Alpine Europa Cup	2024 Euroformula Open Championship is located in Europe
1	R2	(Portugal) Algarve International Circuit, Portimão	28 April	International GT Open; GT Cup Open Europe; Renault Clio Cup Europe; Alpine Europa Cup	2024 Euroformula Open Championship is located in Europe
1	R3	(Portugal) Algarve International Circuit, Portimão	28 April	International GT Open; GT Cup Open Europe; Renault Clio Cup Europe; Alpine Europa Cup	2024 Euroformula Open Championship is located in Europe
2	R1	(Germany) Hockenheimring, Hockenheim	11 May	International GT Open; GT Cup Open Europe; Formula Regional European Championship; Renault Clio Cup Europe	2024 Euroformula Open Championship is located in Europe
2	R2	(Germany) Hockenheimring, Hockenheim	11 May	International GT Open; GT Cup Open Europe; Formula Regional European Championship; Renault Clio Cup Europe	2024 Euroformula Open Championship is located in Europe
2	R3	(Germany) Hockenheimring, Hockenheim	12 May	International GT Open; GT Cup Open Europe; Formula Regional European Championship; Renault Clio Cup Europe	2024 Euroformula Open Championship is located in Europe
3	R1	(Belgium) Circuit de Spa-Francorchamps, Stavelot	25 May	International GT Open; GT Cup Open Europe; Formula Regional European Championship	2024 Euroformula Open Championship is located in Europe
3	R2	(Belgium) Circuit de Spa-Francorchamps, Stavelot	26 May	International GT Open; GT Cup Open Europe; Formula Regional European Championship	2024 Euroformula Open Championship is located in Europe
3	R3	(Belgium) Circuit de Spa-Francorchamps, Stavelot	26 May	International GT Open; GT Cup Open Europe; Formula Regional European Championship	2024 Euroformula Open Championship is located in Europe
4	R1	(Hungary) Hungaroring, Mogyoród	22 June	International GT Open; Porsche Carrera Cup Germany; Formula Regional European Championship; GB3 Championship	2024 Euroformula Open Championship is located in Europe
4	R2	(Hungary) Hungaroring, Mogyoród	23 June	International GT Open; Porsche Carrera Cup Germany; Formula Regional European Championship; GB3 Championship	2024 Euroformula Open Championship is located in Europe
4	R3	(Hungary) Hungaroring, Mogyoród	23 June	International GT Open; Porsche Carrera Cup Germany; Formula Regional European Championship; GB3 Championship	2024 Euroformula Open Championship is located in Europe
5	R1	(France) Circuit Paul Ricard, Le Castellet	20 July	International GT Open; Italian F4 Championship; GT Cup Open Europe; Formula Regional European Championship	2024 Euroformula Open Championship is located in Europe
5	R2	(France) Circuit Paul Ricard, Le Castellet	21 July	International GT Open; Italian F4 Championship; GT Cup Open Europe; Formula Regional European Championship	2024 Euroformula Open Championship is located in Europe
5	R3	(France) Circuit Paul Ricard, Le Castellet	21 July	International GT Open; Italian F4 Championship; GT Cup Open Europe; Formula Regional European Championship	2024 Euroformula Open Championship is located in Europe
6	R1	(Austria) Red Bull Ring, Spielberg	14 September	International GT Open; Formula Regional European Championship; Euro 4 Championship; Porsche Carrera Cup Benelux	2024 Euroformula Open Championship is located in Europe
6	R2	(Austria) Red Bull Ring, Spielberg	15 September	International GT Open; Formula Regional European Championship; Euro 4 Championship; Porsche Carrera Cup Benelux	2024 Euroformula Open Championship is located in Europe
6	R3	(Austria) Red Bull Ring, Spielberg	15 September	International GT Open; Formula Regional European Championship; Euro 4 Championship; Porsche Carrera Cup Benelux	2024 Euroformula Open Championship is located in Europe
7	R1	(Spain) Circuit de Barcelona-Catalunya, Montmeló	28 September	International GT Open; Italian F4 Championship; GT Cup Open Europe; Formula Regional European Championship	2024 Euroformula Open Championship is located in Europe
7	R2	(Spain) Circuit de Barcelona-Catalunya, Montmeló	29 September	International GT Open; Italian F4 Championship; GT Cup Open Europe; Formula Regional European Championship	2024 Euroformula Open Championship is located in Europe
7	R3	(Spain) Circuit de Barcelona-Catalunya, Montmeló	29 September	International GT Open; Italian F4 Championship; GT Cup Open Europe; Formula Regional European Championship	2024 Euroformula Open Championship is located in Europe
8	R1	(Italy) Autodromo Nazionale di Monza, Monza	19 October	International GT Open; GT Cup Open Europe; Clio Cup Series; Alpine Elf Europa Cup	2024 Euroformula Open Championship is located in Europe
8	R2	(Italy) Autodromo Nazionale di Monza, Monza	19 October	International GT Open; GT Cup Open Europe; Clio Cup Series; Alpine Elf Europa Cup	2024 Euroformula Open Championship is located in Europe
8	R3	(Italy) Autodromo Nazionale di Monza, Monza	20 October	International GT Open; GT Cup Open Europe; Clio Cup Series; Alpine Elf Europa Cup	2024 Euroformula Open Championship is located in Europe

== Race results ==
Round		Circuit	Pole position	Fastest lap	Winning driver	Winning team	Rookie winner	Gold Cup winner
1	R1	(Portugal) Algarve International Circuit	(Italy) Francesco Simonazzi	(Spain) Lorenzo Fluxá	(Italy) Francesco Simonazzi	(Italy) BVM Racing	(Brazil) Fernando Barrichello	No starters
1	R2	(Portugal) Algarve International Circuit		(Hungary) Levente Révész	(United States) Brad Benavides	(Germany) Team Motopark	(Brazil) Fernando Barrichello	No starters
1	R3	(Portugal) Algarve International Circuit		(United States) Brad Benavides	(Spain) Lorenzo Fluxá	(Germany) Team Motopark	(Brazil) Fernando Barrichello	No starters
2	R1	(Germany) Hockenheimring	(United States) Brad Benavides	(United States) Brad Benavides	(United States) Brad Benavides	(Germany) Team Motopark	(Brazil) Fernando Barrichello	No classified finishers
2	R2	(Germany) Hockenheimring		(United States) Brad Benavides	(Italy) Francesco Simonazzi	(Italy) BVM Racing	(Brazil) Fernando Barrichello	(Serbia) Paolo Brajnik
2	R3	(Germany) Hockenheimring		(South Korea) Michael Shin	(South Korea) Michael Shin	(Germany) Team Motopark	(Brazil) Fernando Barrichello	No starters
3	R1	(Belgium) Circuit de Spa-Francorchamps	(Italy) Francesco Simonazzi	(Hungary) Levente Révész	(United States) Brad Benavides	(Germany) Team Motopark	(Brazil) Fernando Barrichello	(Serbia) Paolo Brajnik
3	R2	(Belgium) Circuit de Spa-Francorchamps		(Italy) Francesco Simonazzi	(United States) Brad Benavides	(Germany) Team Motopark	(Brazil) Fernando Barrichello	(Serbia) Paolo Brajnik
3	R3	(Belgium) Circuit de Spa-Francorchamps		(Hong Kong) Gerrard Xie	(Hong Kong) Gerrard Xie	(Germany) Team Motopark	(Brazil) Fernando Barrichello	No starters
4	R1	(Hungary) Hungaroring	(South Korea) Michael Shin	(United States) Brad Benavides	(United States) Brad Benavides	(Germany) Team Motopark	(Brazil) Fernando Barrichello	No starters
4	R2	(Hungary) Hungaroring		(Italy) Francesco Simonazzi	(Italy) Francesco Simonazzi	(Italy) BVM Racing	(Brazil) Fernando Barrichello	No starters
4	R3	(Hungary) Hungaroring		(Italy) Francesco Simonazzi	(Italy) Francesco Simonazzi	(Italy) BVM Racing	(Brazil) Fernando Barrichello	No starters
5	R1	(France) Circuit Paul Ricard	(United States) Brad Benavides	(United States) Brad Benavides	(Germany) Jakob Bergmeister	(Germany) Team Motopark	(Brazil) Fernando Barrichello	(Serbia) Paolo Brajnik
5	R2	(France) Circuit Paul Ricard		(United States) Brad Benavides	(United States) Brad Benavides	(Germany) Team Motopark	(Brazil) Fernando Barrichello	No classified finishers
5	R3	(France) Circuit Paul Ricard		(United States) Brad Benavides	(Hungary) Levente Révész	(Germany) Team Motopark	(Brazil) Fernando Barrichello	No starters
6	R1	(Austria) Red Bull Ring	(Mexico) José Garfias	(United States) Brad Benavides	(United States) Brad Benavides	(Germany) Team Motopark	(Brazil) Fernando Barrichello	No classified finishers
6	R2	(Austria) Red Bull Ring		(Mexico) José Garfias	(Brazil) Fernando Barrichello	(Germany) Team Motopark	(Brazil) Fernando Barrichello	No starters
6	R3	(Austria) Red Bull Ring		(Italy) Francesco Simonazzi	(South Korea) Michael Shin	(Germany) Team Motopark	(Brazil) Fernando Barrichello	No starters
7	R1	(Spain) Circuit de Barcelona-Catalunya	(United States) Brad Benavides	(United States) Brad Benavides	(United States) Brad Benavides	(Germany) Team Motopark	(Brazil) Fernando Barrichello	No entries
7	R2	(Spain) Circuit de Barcelona-Catalunya		(Italy) Francesco Simonazzi	(Italy) Francesco Simonazzi	(Italy) BVM Racing	(Brazil) Fernando Barrichello	No entries
7	R3	(Spain) Circuit de Barcelona-Catalunya		(United Kingdom) Edward Pearson	Vladislav Ryabov	(Germany) Team Motopark	Vladislav Ryabov	No entries
8	R1	(Italy) Autodromo Nazionale di Monza	(United States) Brad Benavides	(Italy) Francesco Simonazzi	(Sri Lanka) Yevan David (Note: David was a guest driver and thus ineligible to score points. Francesco Simonazzi was the highest classified driver eligible to score points.)	(Germany) Team Motopark	(Sri Lanka) Yevan David (Note: David was a guest driver and thus ineligible to score points. Fernando Barrichello was the highest classified rookie eligible to score points.)	(Czech Republic) Roman Roubíček (Note: Roubíček was a guest driver and thus ineligible to score points. There were no other Gold Cup starters in the race.)
8	R2	(Italy) Autodromo Nazionale di Monza		(United States) Brad Benavides	(United States) Brad Benavides	(Germany) Team Motopark	(Sri Lanka) Yevan David (Note: David was a guest driver and thus ineligible to score points. Vladislav Ryabov was the highest classified rookie eligible to score points.)	(Czech Republic) Roman Roubíček (Note: Roubíček was a guest driver and thus ineligible to score points. There were no other Gold Cup starters in the race.)
8	R3	(Italy) Autodromo Nazionale di Monza		(Brazil) Fernando Barrichello	(Sri Lanka) Yevan David (Note: David was a guest driver and thus ineligible to score points. Fernando Barrichello was the highest classified driver eligible to score points.)	(Germany) Team Motopark	(Sri Lanka) Yevan David (Note: David was a guest driver and thus ineligible to score points. Fernando Barrichello was the highest classified rookie eligible to score points.)	(Czech Republic) Roman Roubíček (Note: Roubíček was a guest driver and thus ineligible to score points. There were no other Gold Cup starters in the race.)

== Season report ==
=== First half ===
Euroformula Open began its eleventh season with an all-time low of six cars competing at Portimão. BVM’s Francesco Simonazzi, the only non-Motopark driver present, took pole position. He kept the lead at the start of the opening race, with Levente Révész, Brad Benavides and Lorenzo Fluxá initially slotting in behind him before the Hungarian dropped behind the other two drivers later on. Fernando Barrichello started race two from first place, but finished the race last after spending it dropping down the order. Jakob Bergmeister took the lead first, but then fared similarly and dropped back, allowing Benavides to take the win ahead of Fluxá and Simonazzi. Race three saw Fluxá lead the field. After a calm opening stage, a safety car bunched the field up and the Spaniard had to fend off an attack from Benavides. The American then locked up, allowing Simonazzi past him before he was able to get back into second later on. This saw Benavides end the first round atop the standings, seven points ahead of Fluxá.

Benavides led the seven cars competing at the Hockenheimring in qualifying to take pole position for the first race. A slow start dropped him to third behind Révész and Simonazzi, but he immediately started attacking the Italian and retook second on lap three. Six laps later, he repeated the feat to take the lead from Révész. Simonazzi also got past the Hungarian, but penalties handed Bergmeister third place as Simonazzi dropped to sixth. That then gave him pole position for the second race, where he initially fought off Bergmeister before Benavides took second. Simonazzi then held off the American for the remainder of the race to take the win. Motopark’s debutant Michael Shin started the third race from the front and spent the opening part battling Simonazzi, but came out ahead after briefly losing the lead but retaking it right away. Révész in third had to contend with Benavides before the latter dropped to fifth. Still, as Fluxá was absent, Benavides slightly increased his championship lead to 15 points over Simonazzi.

Qualifying at Spa was held in the wet, and Simonazzi came out on top to claim pole position. Benavides used the slipstream to take the lead from third on the grid on the first lap as Motopark’s front-row starter Gerrard Xie stalled. Révész and Bergmeister followed Benavides past Simonazzi. The Hungarian then tried taking the lead, before Benavides got back past and Bergmeister claimed second. Race two saw Benavides climb from fifth on the grid to another win ahead of Bergmeister and Shin in a race filled with hotly contested duels - La Source and Les Combes saw multiple lead changes as drivers went three- and four-wide on the Kemmel Straight. Race three began in wet conditions behind the safety car with Bergmeister spinning out from third place. Révész then did the same, allowing Benavides into third. Reverse-grid pole sitter Xie led Shin to take his maiden Euroformula win. Simonazzi did not start the race due to car troubles and therefore had to watch from the sidelines as Benavides built up his championship advantage to 60 points.

A round at the Hungaroring ended the first half of the championship. Shin took pole position in qualifying for the first race, but lost the lead to Benavides through the opening sequence of corners. The American went on to win the race, while Révész converted his fifth-place start to a podium. Simonazzi was classified sixth and last after having to pit with front wing damage. He bounced back to win the second race by twelve seconds from pole position. Bergmeister came second, unchallenged from behind all race, and Benavides came third after Barrichello went off track ahead of him when he tried to move into second at the end of the first lap. Simonazzi started race three from third and capitalised when Révész attacked Bergmeister for the lead and both went off and dropped out of contention. The Italian then led Benavides and Barrichello home to win by over 13 seconds. While Simonazzi took two wins, Benavides ended all three races on the podium and was therefore able to slightly extend his points lead to 63.

=== Second half ===
Benavides claimed pole position for the first race at Paul Ricard, but both front-row starters had bad getaways, allowing Bergmeister to take the lead ahead of Simonazzi and Révész. The Hungarian then claimed second, and Simonazzi continued dropping down as Benavides and Barrichello also got past him. Révész closed up to Bergmeister at the front, but was unable to threaten his lead. NV Racing’s gentleman driver Paolo Brajnik started race two from first place, but Révész and Benavides soon caught up and overtook him. Rain started to fall, and Brajnik spun and was forced to retire. Five of the six drivers running fought for the podium in tricky, slippery conditions, with Benavides eventually coming out on top to take his sixth win of the season ahead of Révész and Simonazzi. Motopark's debutant Enzo Richer had pole position for race three, but immediately dropped behind Révész, Barrichello and Benavides. The latter then got into second to end the weekend with a 91-point lead, while Barrichello won the Rookie title in third.

Round six was held at the Red Bull Ring and Motopark's José Garfias took pole position on his debut. However, his first race, held in wet conditions, only lasted two corners before he was forced to retire. Benavides took the lead and won the race by 15 seconds. Simonazzi defended his second place as conditions deteriorated before falling behind Motopark's other debutant Edward Pearson and Révész in the final laps. Race two, also in wet conditions, began under a safety car. Pole-sitter Barrichello initially fell behind Shin and Simonazzi when the safety car was withdrawn but was able to fight back. He reclaimed second place from Simonazzi and caught up to leader Shin to retake the lead on lap ten. With Shin focused on keeping Simonazzi behind him, Barrichello was able to take his first win. Race three was dry and Shin started from first place. Barrichello, alongside him, made a poor start and fell back, allowing Shin to build a lead and win the race ahead of Benavides – who was now leading by 104 points – and Simonazzi.

Barcelona hosted the penultimate round of the season and Benavides was fastest in qualifying for race one. He was attacked by Garfias early in the race but moved back into the lead a corner later and subsequently led every lap of the race to take his eighth win of the year. Garfias went off track but Pearson behind him was unable to capitalise and remained third. Vladislav Ryabov, returning to the series with Motopark after a one-off appearance in 2023, started race two in first place. Simonazzi immediately overtook him and Barrichello and Benavides also followed. Benavides then took second, with the positions then remaining unchanged and Simonazzi claiming his fifth win of 2024. Barrichello was on pole for race three but Ryabov took the lead at turn one at the start and took his first single-seater victory. Pearson and Garfias also overtook Barrichello to complete the podium. Benavides finished fifth, ahead of Simonazzi. His lead now stood at 94 points, and with 79 points still up for grabs, he was crowned champion.

At the season finale at Monza, Benavides secured another pole position. Yevan David, debuting as a guest driver for Motopark, started from second place and overtook Benavides at turn four to claim the lead. David managed to establish a comfortable gap as the rest of the field engaged in battles behind him. Amidst the competition, Simonazzi advanced from sixth to second place, while Garfias completed the podium. Benavides started a very wet race two from pole and maintaining his lead throughout to achieve a lights-to-flag victory. Garfias finished second, and David climbed from sixth to third, while Simonazzi retired after a collision with Barrichello. Ryabov began the final race from pole position, but an incident involving four cars at the opening chicane allowed David to take the lead. Although he briefly lost it during a subsequent restart, David managed to regain control and held off Barrichello for the remainder of the race. Bergmeister concluded the season in third place, while Benavides finished fourth, ending 2024 with an 86-point lead.

Benavides secured nine victories and an additional ten podium finishes during the 2024 Euroformula season, achieving a commanding championship win that faced little competition from other drivers. The season was marked by low participation, with a maximum of only eight cars competing in any race, reflecting Euroformula’s ongoing difficulties in attracting both drivers and teams for the third consecutive year. The presence of Benavides, a former Formula 2 driver, as the championship winner highlighted the challenges faced by the series. In response to these issues, a new car and a spec Toyota engine are set to be introduced in 2025, with the goal of reducing entry costs and revitalizing interest in the series. Whether these measures will restore Euroformula’s prominence and encourage larger grids remains to be seen.

== Championship standings ==
=== Drivers' championship ===
Points were awarded as follows:

Position	1st	2nd	3rd	4th	5th	6th	7th	8th	9th	10th	Pole	FL
Points	25	18	15	12	10	8	6	4	2	1	**1**	1

Each drivers' three worst scores were dropped.

Pos	Driver	PRT (Portugal)			HOC (Germany)			SPA (Belgium)			HUN (Hungary)			LEC (France)			RBR (Austria)			CAT (Spain)			MNZ (Italy)			Pts
Pos	Driver	R1	R2	R3	R1	R2	R3	R1	R2	R3	R1	R2	R3	R1	R2	R3	R1	R2	R3	R1	R2	R3	R1	R2	R3	Pts
1	(United States) Brad Benavides	2	1	2	**1**	2	(5)	1	1	3	1	3	2	**3**	1	2	1	(5)	2	**1**	3	(5)	**6**	1	4	431
2	(Italy) Francesco Simonazzi	**1**	3	3	(6)	1	2	**4**	5	(DNS)	6	1	1	5	3	4	4	3	3	5	1	6	2	(Ret)	5	345
3	(Brazil) Fernando Barrichello	(6)	(6)	4	5	(6)	6	6	6	6	4	5	3	4	4	3	6	1	6	4	2	4	4	6	2	264
4	(Germany) Jakob Bergmeister	5	5	5	3	3	4	2	2	4	5	2	6	1	5	5							5	5	3	243
5	(Hungary) Levente Révész	4	4	Ret	2	4	3	3	4	5	3	6	5	2	2	1	3	4	7							236
6	(South Korea) Michael Shin				4	5	1	5	3	2	**2**	4	4				5	2	1							187
7	(Mexico) José Garfias																**Ret**	6	4	2	6	3	3	2	Ret	99
8	(United Kingdom) Edward Pearson																2	7	5	3	4	2				80
9	(Spain) Lorenzo Fluxá	3	2	1																						59
10	Vladislav Ryabov																			6	5	1	Ret	4	Ret	58
11	(Hong Kong) Gerrard Xie							7	8	1																36
12	(Serbia) Paolo Brajnik **G**	WD	WD	WD	Ret	7	DNS	8	7	DNS	WD	WD	WD	6	Ret	DNS	Ret	DNS	DNS	WD	WD	WD	WD	WD	WD	24
13	(Mexico) Ricardo Escotto																			7	7	7				18
14	(Luxembourg) Enzo Richer													Ret	6	6										16
—	(Czech Republic) Roman Roubíček (Note: Roubíček was ineligible to score points in Round 8.) **G**																WD	WD	WD				7	7	6	0
—	(China) Cenyu Han	WD	WD	WD																						0
Guest drivers ineligible to score points
—	(Sri Lanka) Yevan David																						1	3	1	—
Pos	Driver	R1	R2	R3	R1	R2	R3	R1	R2	R3	R1	R2	R3	R1	R2	R3	R1	R2	R3	R1	R2	R3	R1	R2	R3	Pts
Pos	Driver	PRT (Portugal)			HOC (Germany)			SPA (Belgium)			HUN (Hungary)			LEC (France)			RBR (Austria)			CAT (Spain)			MNZ (Italy)			Pts

=== Rookies' championship ===
Points were awarded as follows:

1	2	3	4	5
10	8	6	4	3

Pos	Driver	PRT (Portugal)			HOC (Germany)			SPA (Belgium)			HUN (Hungary)			LEC (France)			RBR (Austria)			CAT (Spain)			MNZ (Italy)			Pts
Pos	Driver	R1	R2	R3	R1	R2	R3	R1	R2	R3	R1	R2	R3	R1	R2	R3	R1	R2	R3	R1	R2	R3	R1	R2	R3	Pts
1	(Brazil) Fernando Barrichello	1	1	1	1	1	1	1	1	1	1	1	1	1	1	1	1	1	1	1	1	2	2	3	2	236
2	Vladislav Ryabov																			2	2	1	Ret	2	Ret	34
3	(Mexico) Ricardo Escotto																			3	3	3				18
4	(Luxembourg) Enzo Richer													Ret	2	2										16
Guest drivers ineligible to score points
	(Sri Lanka) Yevan David																						1	1	1	
Pos	Driver	R1	R2	R3	R1	R2	R3	R1	R2	R3	R1	R2	R3	R1	R2	R3	R1	R2	R3	R1	R2	R3	R1	R2	R3	Pts
Pos	Driver	PRT (Portugal)			HOC (Germany)			SPA (Belgium)			HUN (Hungary)			LEC (France)			RBR (Austria)			CAT (Spain)			MNZ (Italy)			Pts

Colour	Result
Gold	Winner
Silver	Second place
Bronze	Third place
Green	Points classification
Blue	Non-points classification
Blue	Non-classified finish (NC)
Purple	Retired, not classified (Ret)
Red	Did not qualify (DNQ)
Red	Did not pre-qualify (DNPQ)
Black	Disqualified (DSQ)
White	Did not start (DNS)
White	Withdrew (WD)
White	Race cancelled (C)
Blank	Did not practice (DNP)
Blank	Did not arrive (DNA)
Blank	Excluded (EX)

**Bold** – Pole

Italics – Fastest Lap

=== Teams' championship ===
Points were awarded as follows, with each team counting their best two results:

1	2	3	4	5
10	8	6	4	3

Pos	Driver	PRT (Portugal)			HOC (Germany)			SPA (Belgium)			HUN (Hungary)			LEC (France)			RBR (Austria)			CAT (Spain)			MNZ (Italy)			Pts
Pos	Driver	R1	R2	R3	R1	R2	R3	R1	R2	R3	R1	R2	R3	R1	R2	R3	R1	R2	R3	R1	R2	R3	R1	R2	R3	Pts
1	(Germany) Team Motopark	2	1	1	1	2	1	1	1	1	1	2	2	1	1	1	1	1	1	1	2	1	3	1	2	406
1	(Germany) Team Motopark	3	2	2	2	3	3	2	2	2	2	3	3	2	2	2	2	2	2	2	3	2	4	2	3	406
2	(Italy) BVM Racing	1	3	3	6	1	2	4	5	DNS	6	1	1	5	3	4	4	3	3	5	1	6	2	Ret	5	123
3	(Serbia) NV Racing	WD	WD	WD	Ret	7	DNS	8	7	DNS	WD	WD	WD	6	Ret	DNS	Ret	DNS	DNS	WD	WD	WD	WD	WD	WD	0
4	(Czech Republic) STKMělník																WD	WD	WD				7	7	6	0
Pos	Driver	R1	R2	R3	R1	R2	R3	R1	R2	R3	R1	R2	R3	R1	R2	R3	R1	R2	R3	R1	R2	R3	R1	R2	R3	Pts
Pos	Driver	PRT (Portugal)			HOC (Germany)			SPA (Belgium)			HUN (Hungary)			LEC (France)			RBR (Austria)			CAT (Spain)			MNZ (Italy)			Pts
