= Fernando Barrichello =

Brazilian racing driver (born 2005)

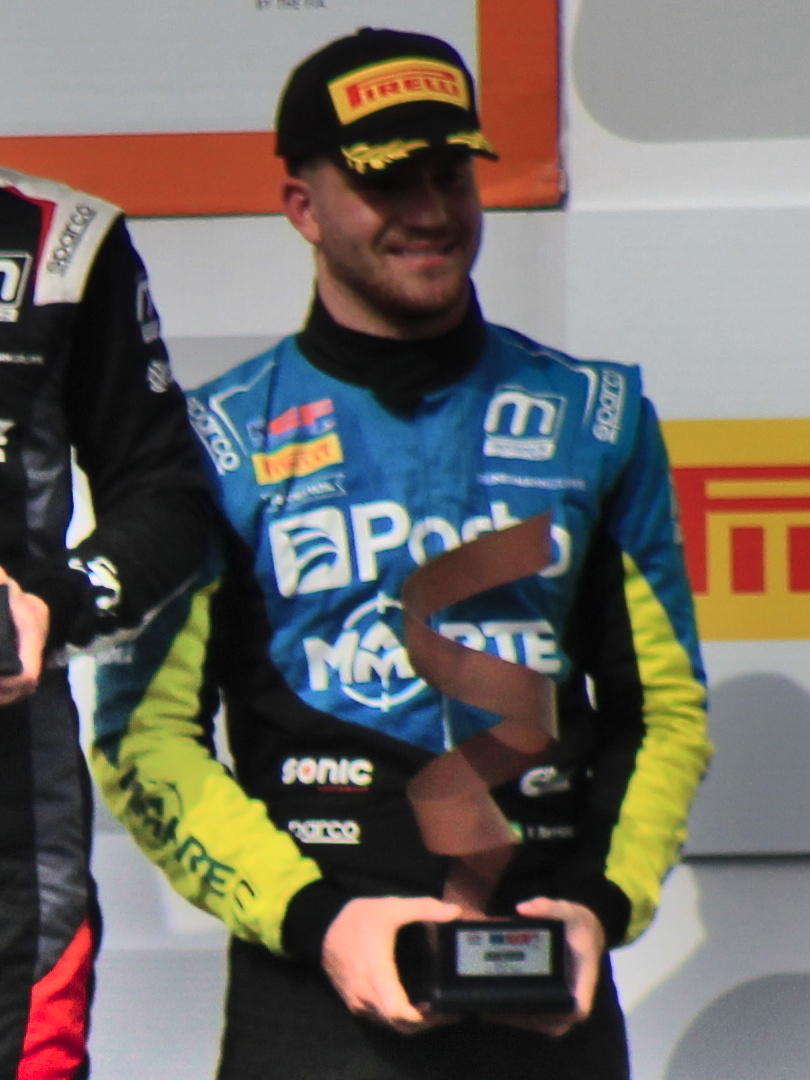
- Barrichello in 2024
- Nationality: (Brazil) Brazilian
- Born: Fernando Alcide Barrichello; 12 September 2005 (age 21) São Paulo, Brazil
- Relatives: Rubens Barrichello (father); Eduardo Barrichello (brother); Affonso Giaffone (second uncle); Felipe Giaffone (uncle); Nicolas Giaffone (cousin)

FIA Formula 3 Championship career
- Debut season: 2025
- Current team: AIX Racing
- Car number: 28
- Starts: 21
- Wins: 0
- Podiums: 0
- Poles: 0
- Fastest laps: 0
- Best finish: 28th in 2026

Previous series
- 2024–2025; 2023; 2023; 2022–2023: Euroformula Open; F4 Spanish; F4 UAE; F4 Brazilian
- Statistics up to date as of 14 September 2026.

Fernando "Fefo" Alcide Barrichello (born 12 September 2005) is a Brazilian racing driver who last competed in the FIA Formula 3 Championship for AIX Racing.

Barrichello previously competed in the Euroformula Open, finishing third in 2024. He is the youngest son of Formula One race winner, Rubens Barrichello and the younger brother of Eduardo Barrichello.

== Career ==
=== Karting ===
Barrichello made his karting debut in the 2015 Florida Winter Tour in the Mini ROK class, he finished eighth. The only top-three finish in his karting career was coming second in the 2018 Orlando Cup in the Junior ROK category.

=== Formula 4 ===
==== 2022 ====
Barrichello was announced for Full Time Sports to drive in the inaugural season of the F4 Brazilian Championship, he won two races and came seventh in the championship with 123 points.

==== 2023 ====
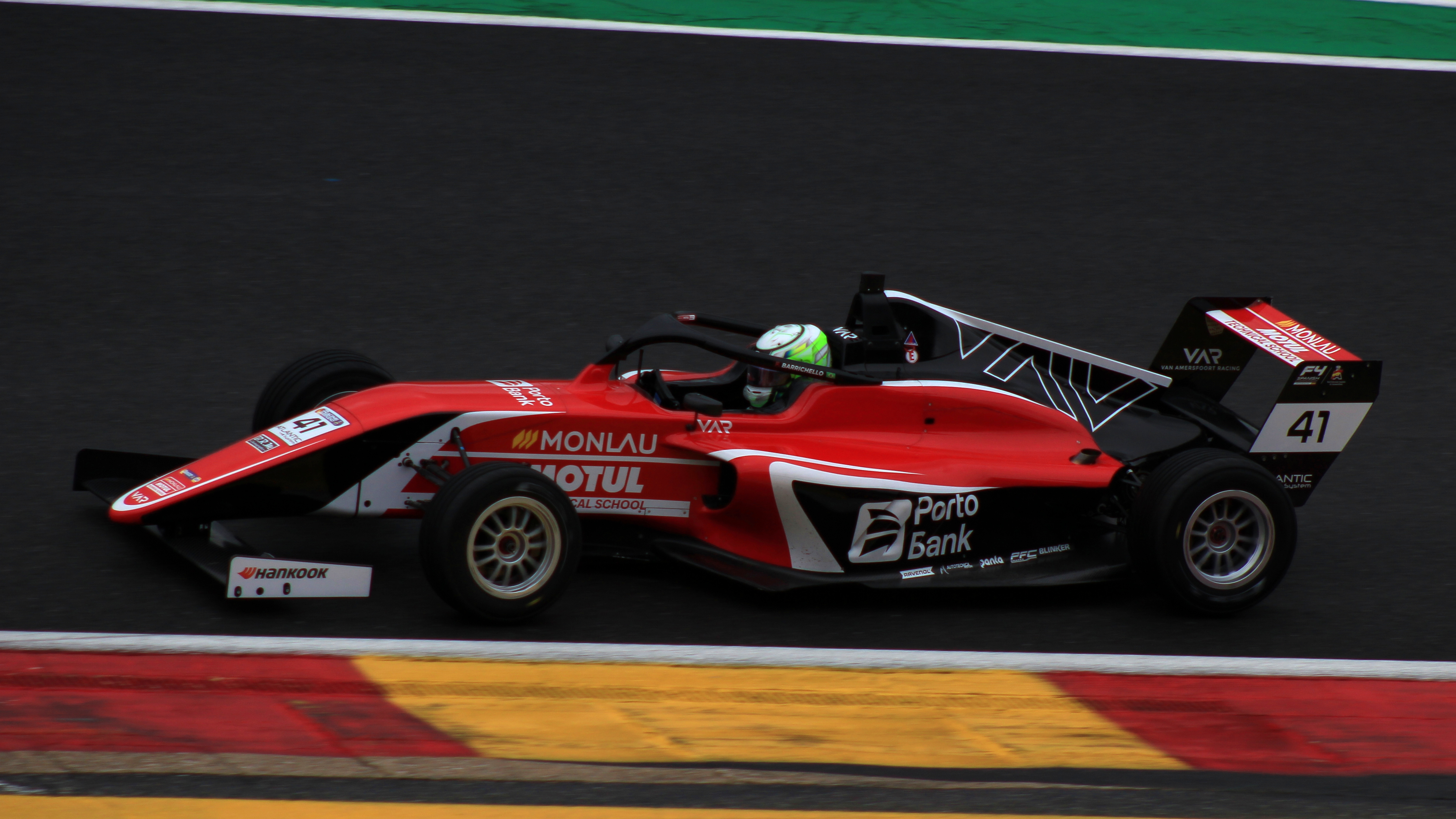
Barrichello driving at Spa-Francorchamps during the 2023 F4 Spanish Championship

At the start of 2023, Barrichello drove for Carlin in the 2023 Formula 4 UAE Championship. Contesting nine races, he finished the season pointless in 42nd.

For his full time campaign, Barrichello joined the 2023 F4 Spanish Championship with Monlau Motorsport, but only picked up one points finish throughout the season, in the first round at Spa-Francorchamps, he was 17th in the championship standings with six points.

Barrichello joined the 2023 F4 Brazilian Championship from second round and onwards at Interlagos with Cavaleiro Sports, his best result in the round being eighth in the second race. He was consistent with a string of points throughout the season, and scored four podiums, a second place at the second race in Mogi Guaçu, a third place at the third race in Goiânia and two second places at the next round at Interlagos. He finished the final round in Interlagos with two more podiums and a maiden fastest lap in the final race. Barrichello finished the championship in fifth with 140 points.

=== Euroformula Open Championship ===
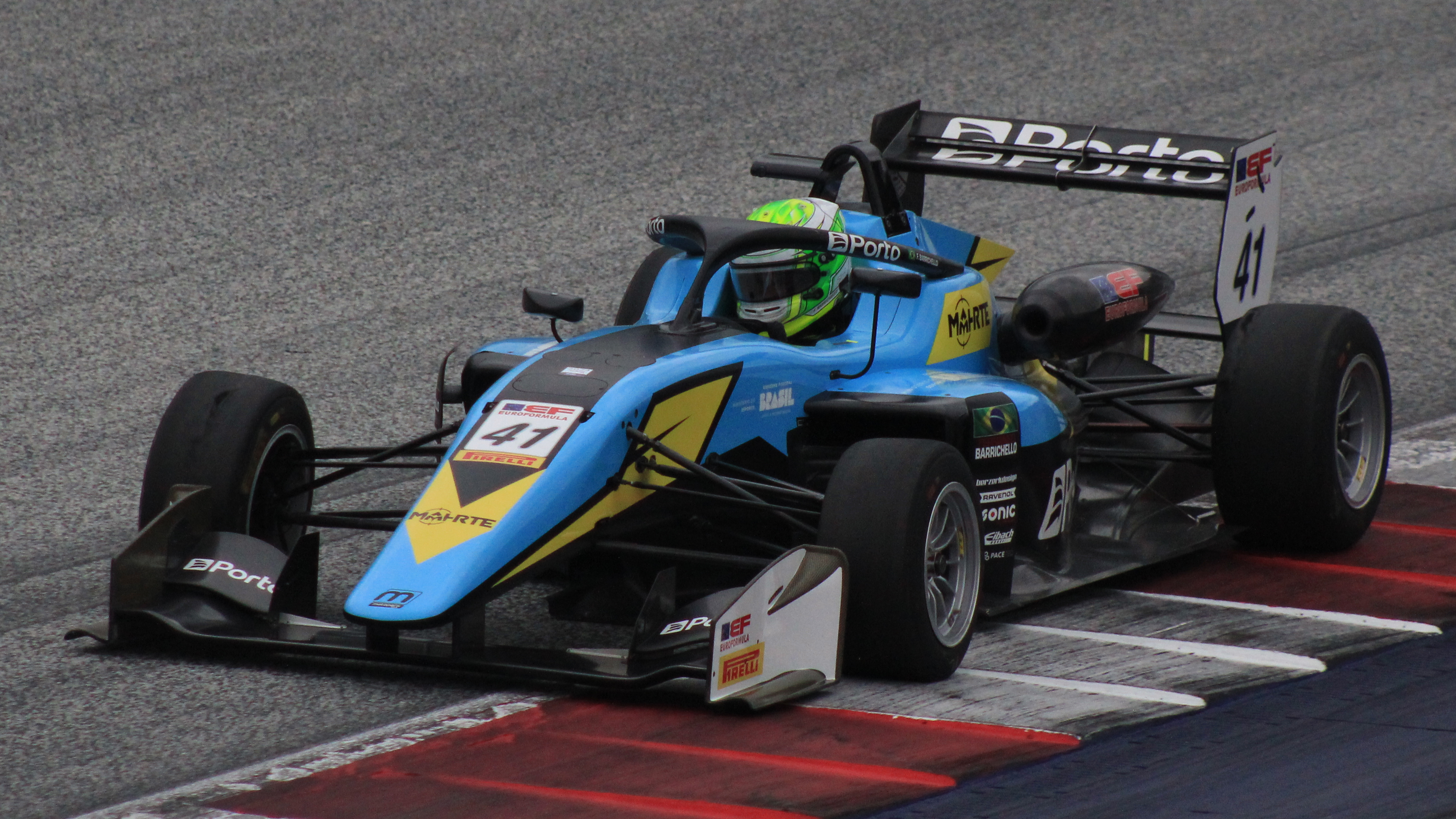
Barrichello racing at the Red Bull Ring during the 2024 Euroformula Open

==== 2024 ====
Barrichello moved to Euroformula Open in 2024 with Team Motopark, where he partnered former Formula 2 driver Brad Benavides, Levente Révész, Cenyu Han and Jakob Bergmeister. He was the only driver in the rookies cup until the final two rounds and finished third in the main championship with only one win, one fastest lap, five podiums and 264 points.

==== 2025 ====
Barrichello continued in Euroformula Open for 2025, remaining with Team Motopark.

=== FIA Formula 3 ===
On 29th August, it was announced that Barrichello would join AIX Racing for the 2025 FIA Formula 3 Championship finale at Monza Circuit, he achieved a best result of seventeenth in the sprint race but retired from the feature race. In February 2026, he was announced as a full time driver for the 2026 season. His only points scored were in the sprint race of the seventh round at the Hungoraring, where he came in ninth.

=== Formula E ===
After being in the team garage at the 2026 Madrid ePrix, along with being highly scouted by team principal Ian James, Barrichello was signed by Jaguar TCS Racing to drive their Gen4 proto_TYPE car at the 2026 Goodwood Festival of Speed, as main drivers António Félix da Costa and Stoffel Vandoorne both had clashing World Endurance Championship commitments.

== Karting record ==
=== Karting career summary ===
Season	Series	Team	Position
2015	Florida Winter Tour - Micro ROK		8th
2016	Florida Winter Tour - Mini ROK		35th
2016	Florida Winter Tour - Rotax Mini Max		16th
2017	Florida Winter Tour - Mini ROK		21st
2017	Florida Winter Tour - Rotax Mini Max		8th
2018	SKUSA SuperNationals XXII - X30 Junior class	NF Piquet Sports	13th
2018	Florida Winter Tour - Junior ROK		12th
2018	Orlando Cup - Junior ROK		2nd
2019	Florida Winter Tour - Senior ROK		39th
2023	Rotax Max Challenge Winter Trophy - Senior Max		15th
2024	Rotax Max Challenge Winter Trophy - Senior Max		18th

== Racing record ==
=== Racing career summary ===
Season	Series	Team	Races	Wins	Poles	F/Laps	Podiums	Points	Position
2022	F4 Brazilian Championship	Full Time Sports	18	2	0	1	4	123	7th
2023	Formula 4 UAE Championship	Rodin Carlin	9	0	0	0	0	0	42nd
2023	F4 Spanish Championship	Monlau Motorsport	21	0	0	0	0	6	17th
2023	F4 Brazilian Championship	Cavaleiro Sports	15	0	0	1	6	140	5th
2024	Euroformula Open Championship	Team Motopark	24	1	0	1	5	264	**3rd**
2025	Euroformula Open Championship	Team Motopark	21	1	0	1	6	212	7th
2025	FIA Formula 3 Championship	AIX Racing	2	0	0	0	0	0	35th
2026	FIA Formula 3 Championship	AIX Racing	19	0	0	0	0	2	28th

* Season still in progress.

=== Complete F4 Brazilian Championship results ===
(key) (Races in bold indicate pole position) (Races in italics indicate fastest lap)

Year	Team	1	2	3	4	5	6	7	8	9	10	11	12	13	14	15	16	17	18	DC	Points
2022	Full Time Sports	MOG1; 1; 4	MOG1; 2; 3	MOG1; 3; 14†	INT1; 1; 12	INT1; 2; 9	INT1; 3; 7	INT2; 1; 7	INT2; 2; 1	INT2; 3; 7	MOG2; 1; 6	MOG2; 2; 3	MOG2; 3; 6	GYN; 1; 4	GYN; 2; 5	GYN; 3; 13	INT3; 1; 8	INT3; 2; 1	INT3; 3; 8	7th	123
2023	Cavaleiro Sports	INT1; 1	INT1; 2	INT1; 3	INT2; 1; 13†	INT2; 2; 8	INT2; 3; 13	MOG; 1; 6	MOG; 2; 2	MOG; 3; 4	GYN; 1; 6	GYN; 2; 4	GYN; 3; 3	INT3; 1; 4	INT3; 2; 2	INT3; 3; 2	INT4; 1; 3	INT4; 2; 9	INT4; 3; 2	5th	140

=== Complete Formula 4 UAE Championship results ===
(key) (Races in bold indicate pole position) (Races in italics indicate fastest lap)

Year	Team	1	2	3	4	5	6	7	8	9	10	11	12	13	14	15	DC	Points
2023	Rodin Carlin	DUB1; 1; 22	DUB1; 2; 31	DUB1; 3; 21	KMT1; 1	KMT1; 2	KMT1; 3	KMT2; 1	KMT2; 2	KMT2; 3	DUB2; 1; 32	DUB2; 2; 30	DUB2; 3; 36	YMC; 1; 23	YMC; 2; 22	YMC; 3 Ret	42nd	0

=== Complete F4 Spanish Championship results ===
(key) (Races in bold indicate pole position) (Races in italics indicate fastest lap)

Year	Team	1	2	3	4	5	6	7	8	9	10	11	12	13	14	15	16	17	18	19	20	21	DC	Points
2023	Monlau Motorsport	SPA; 1; 24	SPA; 2; 24	SPA; 3; 7	ARA; 1; 31†	ARA; 2; 22	ARA; 3 Ret	NAV; 1; 24†	NAV; 2; 29	NAV; 3; 23	JER; 1 Ret	JER; 2; 22	JER; 3; 17	EST; 1 Ret	EST; 2; 21	EST; 3 Ret	CRT; 1; 15	CRT; 2; 20	CRT; 3 DSQ	CAT; 1; 19	CAT; 2 Ret	CAT; 3; 17	17th	6

=== Complete Euroformula Open Championship results ===
(key) (Races in bold indicate pole position) (Races in italics indicate fastest lap)

Year	Team	1	2	3	4	5	6	7	8	9	10	11	12	13	14	15	16	17	18	19	20	21	22	23	24	Pos	Points
2024	Team Motopark	PRT; 1; 6	PRT; 2; 6	PRT; 3; 4	HOC; 1; 4	HOC; 2; 6	HOC; 3; 6	SPA; 1; 6	SPA; 2; 6	SPA; 3; 6	HUN; 1; 4	HUN; 2; 5	HUN; 3; 3	LEC; 1; 4	LEC; 2; 4	LEC; 3; 3	RBR; 1; 6	RBR; 2; 1	RBR; 3; 6	CAT; 1; 4	CAT; 2; 2	CAT; 3; 4	MNZ; 1; 4	MNZ; 2; 6	MNZ; 3; 2	3rd	264
2025	Team Motopark	PRT; 1; 4	PRT; 2; 6	PRT; 3; 7	SPA; 1 Ret	SPA; 2; 3	SPA; 3; 5	HOC; 1; 5	HOC; 2; 7	HOC; 3; 6	HUN; 1; 7	HUN; 2; 6	HUN; 3; 7	LEC; 1; 5	LEC; 2; 1	LEC; 3; 3	RBR; 1	RBR; 2	RBR; 3	CAT; 1; 3	CAT; 2; 3	CAT; 3; 6	MNZ; 1; 2	MNZ; 2; 10	MNZ; 3; 6	7th	216

=== Complete FIA Formula 3 Championship results ===
(key) (Races in bold indicate pole position) (Races in italics indicate fastest lap)

Year	Entrant	1	2	3	4	5	6	7	8	9	10	11	12	13	14	15	16	17	18	19	20	DC	Points
2025	AIX Racing	MEL; SPR	MEL; FEA	BHR; SPR	BHR; FEA	IMO; SPR	IMO; FEA	MON; SPR	MON; FEA	CAT; SPR	CAT; FEA	RBR; SPR	RBR; FEA	SIL; SPR	SIL; FEA	SPA; SPR	SPA; FEA	HUN; SPR	HUN; FEA	MNZ; SPR; 17	MNZ; FEA; Ret	35th	0
2026	AIX Racing	MEL; SPR; 27	MEL; FEA; 18	MON; SPR; 20	MON; FEA; Ret	CAT; SPR; 17	CAT; FEA; 24	RBR; SPR; 23	RBR; FEA; Ret	SIL; SPR; 24	SIL; FEA; 27†	SPA; SPR; 20	SPA; FEA; Ret	HUN; SPR; 9	HUN; FEA; Ret	MNZ; SPR; Ret	MNZ; FEA; Ret	MAD; SPR; 25	MAD; FEA1; Ret	MAD; FEA2; 23		28th	2
