= Cenyu Han =

Chinese racing driver (born 2004)

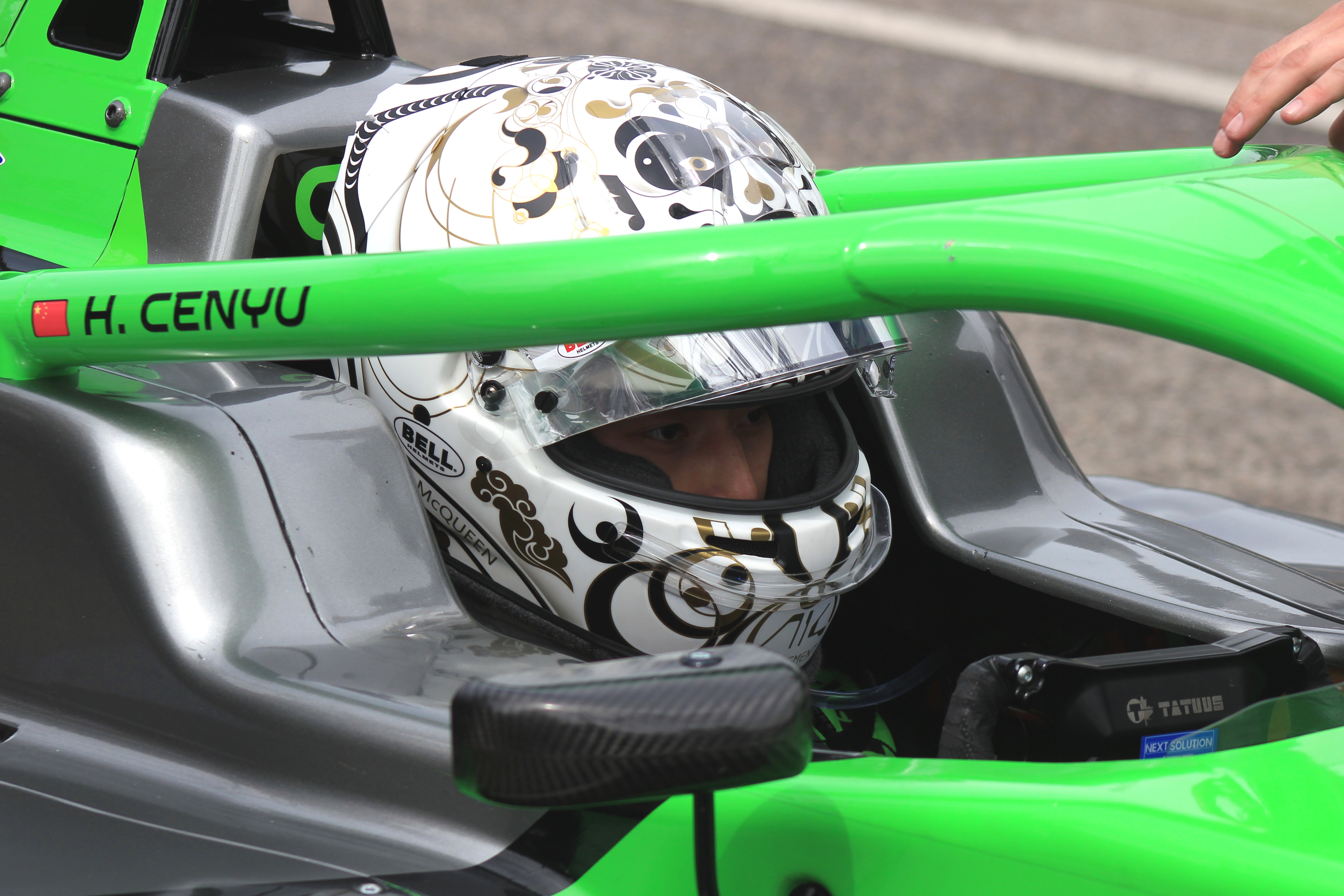
- Han in 2023
- Nationality: (China) Chinese
- Born: 22 December 2004 (age 21) Nanjing, Jiangsu, China

Euroformula Open Championship career
- Debut season: 2024
- Current team: Team Motopark
- Car number: TBA
- Starts: 0
- Wins: 0
- Podiums: 0
- Poles: 0
- Fastest laps: 0
- Best finish: TBD in 2024

Previous series
- 2023 2023 2022 2020–2021 2020–2021: Eurocup-3; FR Middle East Championship; FR European Championship; Italian F4 Championship; ADAC Formula 4

Cenyu Han (Chinese: 韓岑宇; pinyin: Hán Cényǔ, born 22 December 2004), also known by his pseudonym "McQueen", is a Chinese racing driver who last competed in the Euroformula Open Championship for Team Motopark, having previously competed in Eurocup-3 and the Formula Regional European Championship. He was part of Fernando Alonso's A14 Management.

== Career ==
=== Karting ===
Han began his karting career in 2013 at the age of eight. After a short career competing in China and Malaysia, Han made his European karting debut in Italy in October 2014, and would move to Rome the following year to further his karting career under the guidance of Super GT driver Andrea Caldarelli, former Formula One driver Vitantonio Liuzzi, and karting veterans Davide Forè and Felice Tiene.

=== Lower formulae ===
==== 2020 ====
For his first season in single-seaters, Han signed to compete in the Italian F4 Championship with AKM Motorsport. After the first round at Misano however the Chinese driver switched to Van Amersfoort Racing, with whom he would contest the rest of his campaign. He finished 33rd in the standings, having failed to score a point.

That year, Han also made an appearance in the final two rounds of the ADAC Formula 4 Championship series, finishing eleventh in five of his six races.

==== 2021 ====
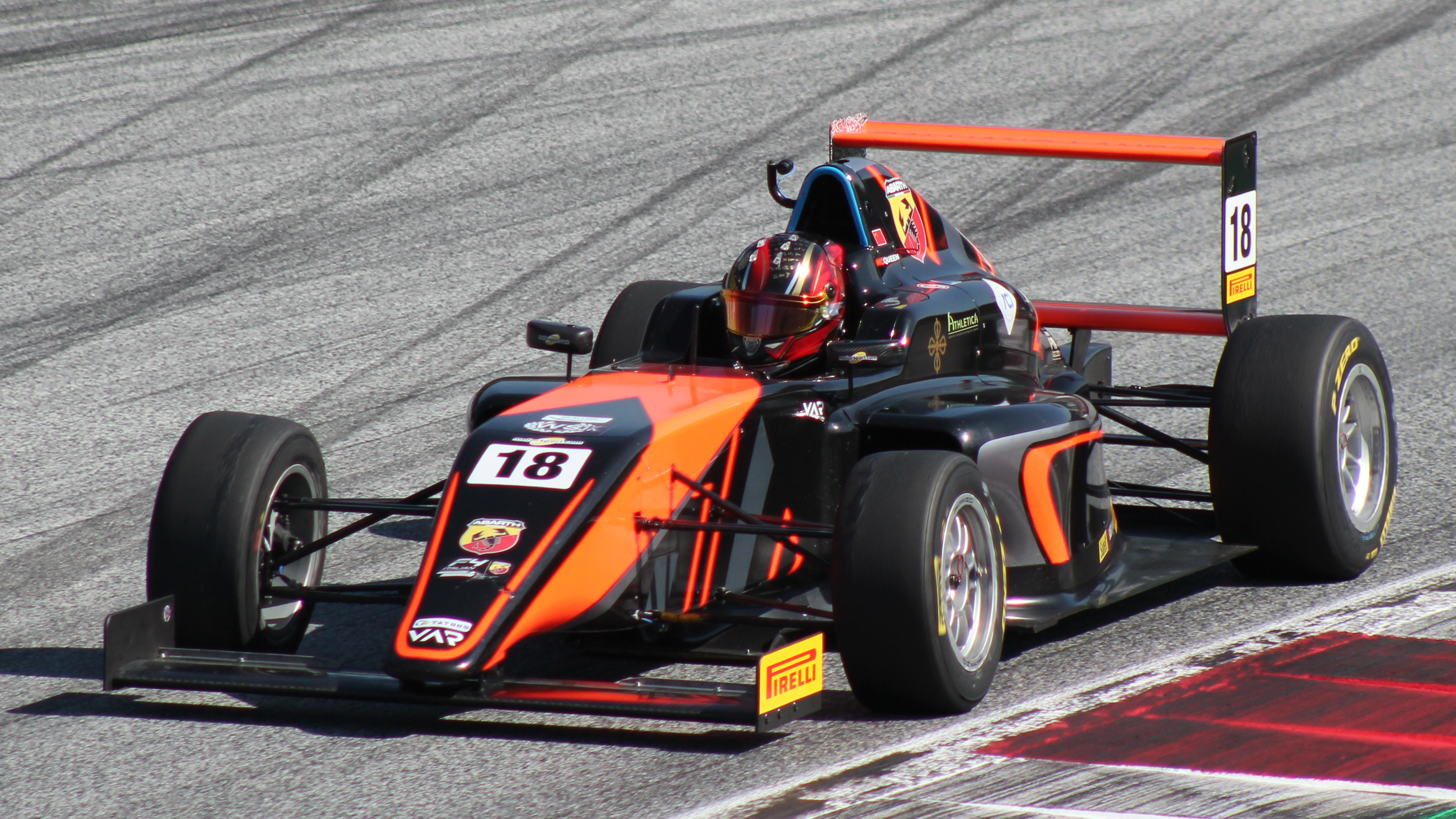
Han racing in the 2021 Italian F4 Championship at the Red Bull Ring.

For 2021, Han returned to Van Amersfoort, scheduled to race in the Italian F4 Championship and ADAC Formula 4 Championship. His season in Italy would end up being more fruitful than the year before, as Han scored his first points with an eighth place at Misano and took a season-best sixth in the following race at Vallelunga. That round also contained a barrel roll after colliding with Joshua Dürksen in Race 3, although Han was able to bounce back with a point at Imola. Having missed the final two rounds of the season, Han finished 26th in the championship, being beaten by all of his full-time teammates.

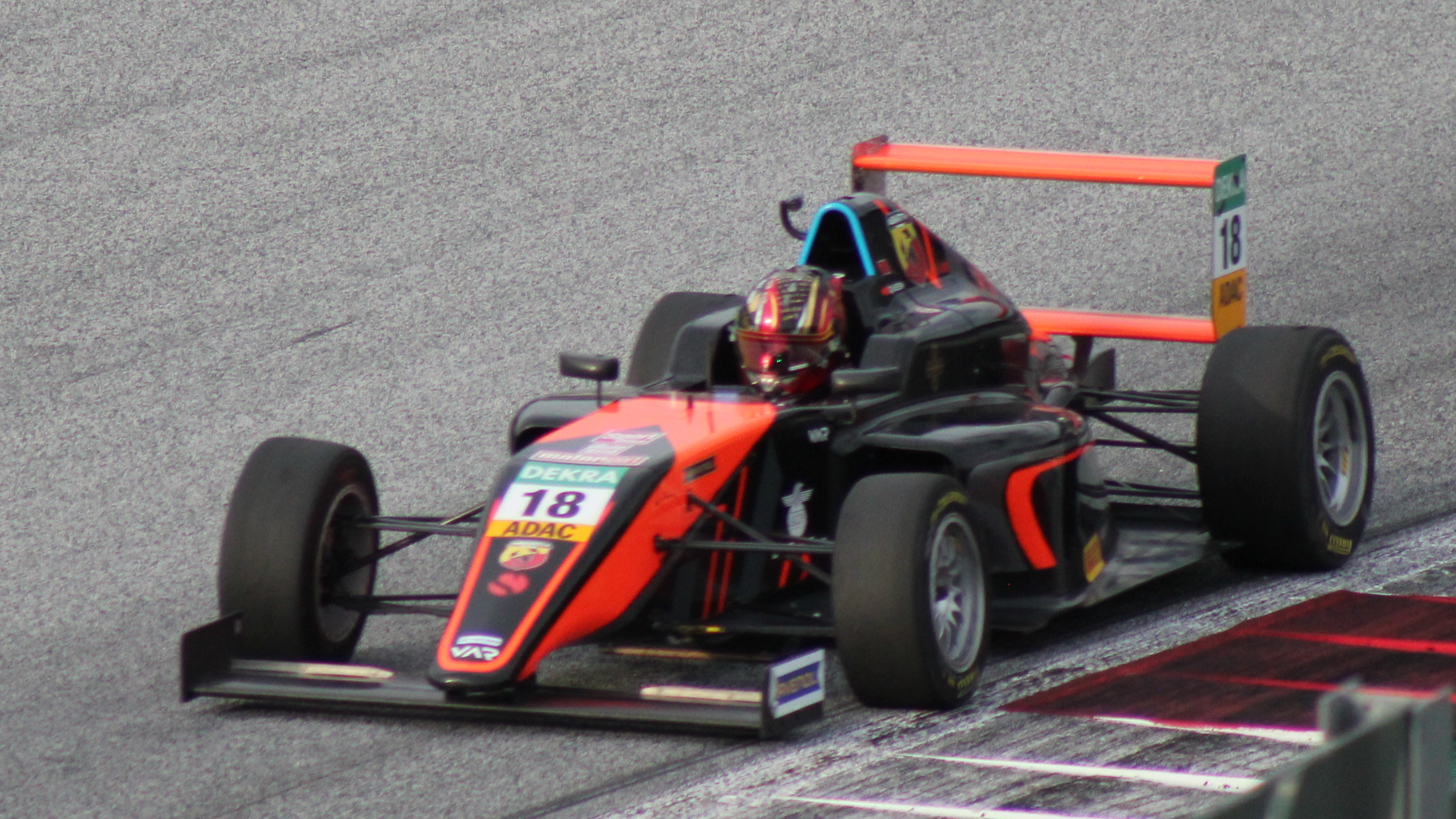
Han racing in the 2021 ADAC Formula 4 Championship at the Red Bull Ring.

In Germany, Han was able to score his first podium in car racing, finishing second in Austria after a chaotic race that contained multiple crashes from the championship protagonists. He did not complete a full campaign here either, missing four rounds due to visa issues.

=== Formula Regional ===
==== 2022 ====
Han progressed to the Formula Regional European Championship in 2022, partnering Pietro Armanni and Macéo Capietto at Monolite Racing. However, after just five rounds in which he failed to score points, he withdrew from the championship.

==== 2023 ====
Han competed in the 2023 Formula Regional Middle East Championship with R&B Racing. He finished the season in 35th.

=== Eurocup-3 ===
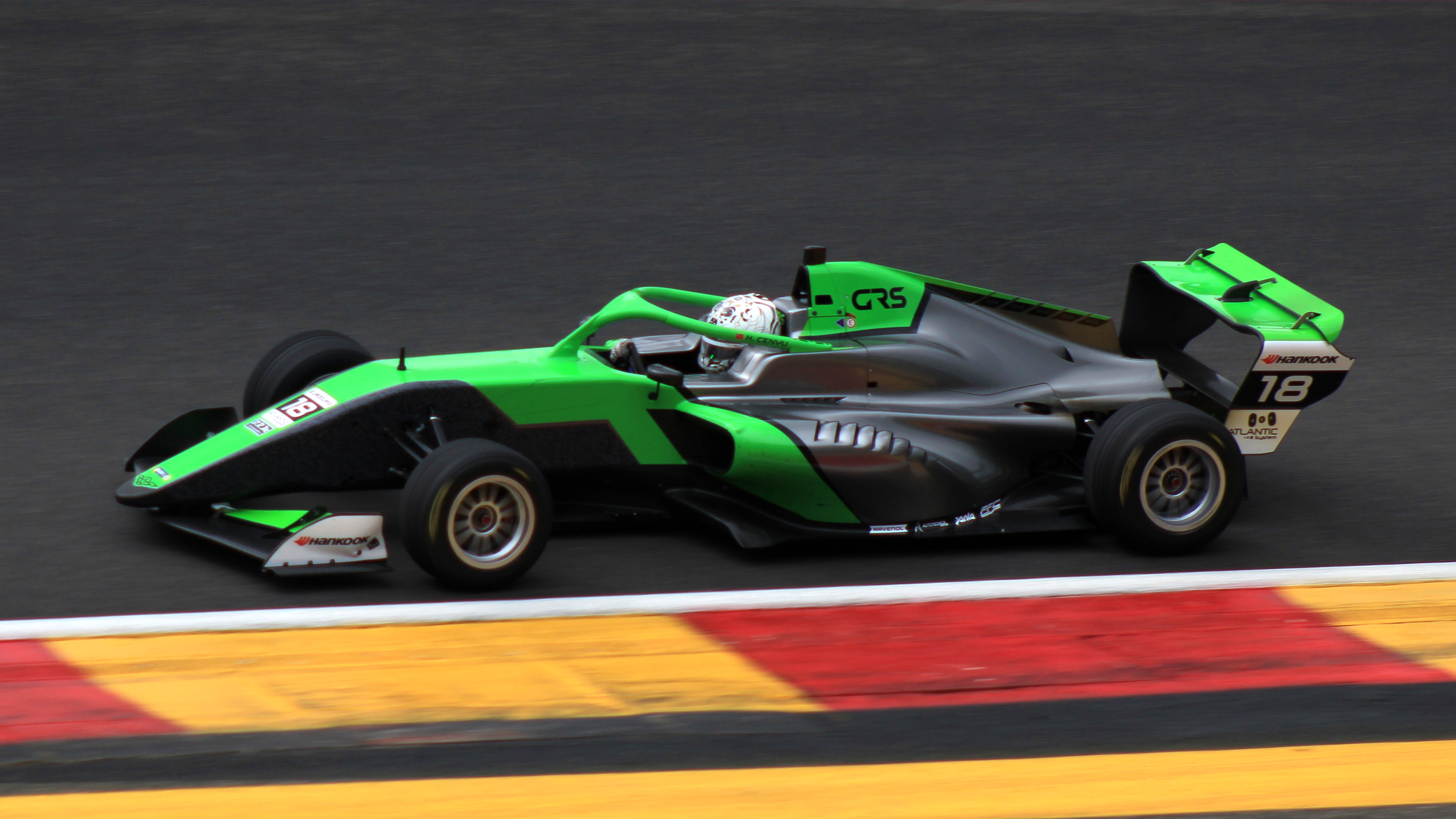
Han racing in the 2023 Eurocup-3 season at Spa-Francorchamps.

For his main 2023 campaign, Han raced in Eurocup-3 with Spanish team Global Racing Service. Han would go on to claim the second podium of his racing career in the series' inaugural race at Spa-Francorchamps before his season was ended prematurely after three rounds.

=== Euroformula Open ===
In 2024, Han was announced to join Team Motopark in the Euroformula Open Championship, but he ultimately did not race in any round.

== Racing record ==
=== Racing career summary ===
Season	Series	Team	Races	Wins	Poles	F/Laps	Podiums	Points	Position
2020	Italian F4 Championship	AKM Motorsport	3	0	0	0	0	0	33rd
2020	Italian F4 Championship	Van Amersfoort Racing	17	0	0	0	0	0	33rd
2020	ADAC Formula 4 Championship	Van Amersfoort Racing	6	0	0	0	0	0	18th
2021	Italian F4 Championship	Van Amersfoort Racing	15	0	0	0	0	13	26th
2021	ADAC Formula 4 Championship	Van Amersfoort Racing	6	0	0	0	1	25	13th
2022	Formula Regional European Championship	Monolite Racing	9	0	0	0	0	0	40th
2023	Formula Regional Middle East Championship	R&B Racing	15	0	0	0	0	0	35th
2023	Eurocup-3	GRS Team	4	0	0	0	1	21	15th
2024	Euroformula Open Championship	Team Motopark	0	0	0	0	0	0	NC

=== Complete Italian F4 Championship results ===
(key) (Races in bold indicate pole position) (Races in italics indicate fastest lap)

Year	Team	1	2	3	4	5	6	7	8	9	10	11	12	13	14	15	16	17	18	19	20	21	Pos	Points
2020	AKM Motorsport	MIS; 1; 16	MIS; 2 Ret	MIS; 3; 17																			33rd	0
2020	Van Amersfoort Racing				IMO1; 1; 16	IMO1; 2; 21	IMO1; 3; 14	RBR; 1; 21	RBR; 2; 23	RBR; 3; 17	MUG; 1 Ret	MUG; 2; 24	MUG; 3 Ret	MNZ; 1; 13	MNZ; 2 Ret	MNZ; 3; 16	IMO2; 1; 19	IMO2; 2 Ret	IMO2; 3; 18	VLL; 1; 15	VLL; 2 C	VLL; 3; 19	33rd	0
2021	Van Amersfoort Racing	LEC; 1; 15	LEC; 2; 31†	LEC; 3; 18	MIS; 1; 14	MIS; 2 Ret	MIS; 3; 8	VLL; 1; 6	VLL; 2; 23	VLL; 3 Ret	IMO; 1; 16	IMO; 2; 10	IMO; 3; 21	RBR; 1; 20	RBR; 2; 22	RBR; 3; 13	MUG; 1	MUG; 2	MUG; 3	MNZ; 1	MNZ; 2	MNZ; 3	26th	13

=== Complete ADAC Formula 4 Championship results ===
(key) (Races in bold indicate pole position) (Races in italics indicate fastest lap)

Year	Team	1	2	3	4	5	6	7	8	9	10	11	12	13	14	15	16	17	18	19	20	21	Pos	Points
2020	Van Amersfoort Racing	LAU1; 1	LAU1; 2	LAU1; 3	NÜR1; 1	NÜR1; 2	NÜR1; 3	HOC; 1	HOC; 2	HOC; 3	NÜR2; 1	NÜR2; 2	NÜR2; 3	RBR; 1	RBR; 2	RBR; 3	LAU2; 1; 13	LAU2; 2; 11	LAU2; 3; 11	OSC; 1; 11	OSC; 2; 11	OSC; 3; 11	18th	0
2021	Van Amersfoort Racing	RBR; 1; 10	RBR; 2; 9	RBR; 3; 2	ZAN; 1; 19	ZAN; 2; 16	ZAN; 3; 11	NÜR; 1	NÜR; 2	NÜR; 3	HOC1; 1	HOC1; 2	HOC1; 3	SAC; 1	SAC; 2	SAC; 3	HOC2; 1	HOC2; 2	HOC2; 3				13th	25

=== Complete Formula Regional European Championship results ===
(key) (Races in bold indicate pole position) (Races in italics indicate fastest lap)

Year	Team	1	2	3	4	5	6	7	8	9	10	11	12	13	14	15	16	17	18	19	20	DC	Points
2022	Monolite Racing	MNZ; 1; 28	MNZ; 2; 31	IMO; 1; 29	IMO; 2; 30	MCO; 1; 28	MCO; 2 DNQ	LEC; 1 Ret	LEC; 2; 29	ZAN; 1; 31	ZAN; 2; 28	HUN; 1	HUN; 2	SPA; 1	SPA; 2	RBR; 1	RBR; 2	CAT; 1	CAT; 2	MUG; 1	MUG; 2	40th	0

=== Complete Formula Regional Middle East Championship results ===
(key) (Races in bold indicate pole position) (Races in italics indicate fastest lap)

Year	Entrant	1	2	3	4	5	6	7	8	9	10	11	12	13	14	15	DC	Points
2023	R&B Racing	DUB1; 1; 21	DUB1; 2; 24	DUB1; 3; 23	KUW1; 1; 15	KUW1; 2; 17	KUW1; 3; 14	KUW2; 1; 21	KUW2; 2; 23	KUW2; 3; 19	DUB2; 1; 20	DUB2; 2; 21	DUB2; 3 Ret	ABU; 1; 19	ABU; 2; 19	ABU; 3; 17	35th	0

† – Driver did not finish the race but was classified, as he completed more than 90% of the race distance.

=== Complete Eurocup-3 results ===
(key) (Races in bold indicate pole position) (Races in italics indicate fastest lap)

Year	Team	1	2	3	4	5	6	7	8	9	10	11	12	13	14	15	16	DC	Points
2023	GRS Team	SPA; 1; 2	SPA; 2; 13	ARA; 1 WD	ARA; 2 WD	MNZ; 1; 9	MNZ; 2; 10	ZAN; 1	ZAN; 2	JER; 1	JER; 2	EST; 1	EST; 2	CRT; 1	CRT; 2	BAR; 1	BAR; 2	15th	21

=== Complete Euroformula Open Championship results ===
(key) (Races in bold indicate pole position) (Races in italics indicate fastest lap)

Year	Team	1	2	3	4	5	6	7	8	9	10	11	12	13	14	15	16	17	18	19	20	21	22	23	24	DC	Points
2024	Team Motopark	POR; 1 WD	POR; 2 WD	POR; 3 WD	HOC; 1	HOC; 2	HOC; 3	SPA; 1	SPA; 2	SPA; 3	HUN; 1	HUN; 2	HUN; 3	LEC; 1	LEC; 2	LEC; 3	RBR; 1	RBR; 2	RBR; 3	CAT; 1	CAT; 2	CAT; 3	MNZ; 1	MNZ; 2	MNZ; 3	NC	0

* Season still in progress.
