= Francesco Simonazzi =

Italian racing driver (born 2004)

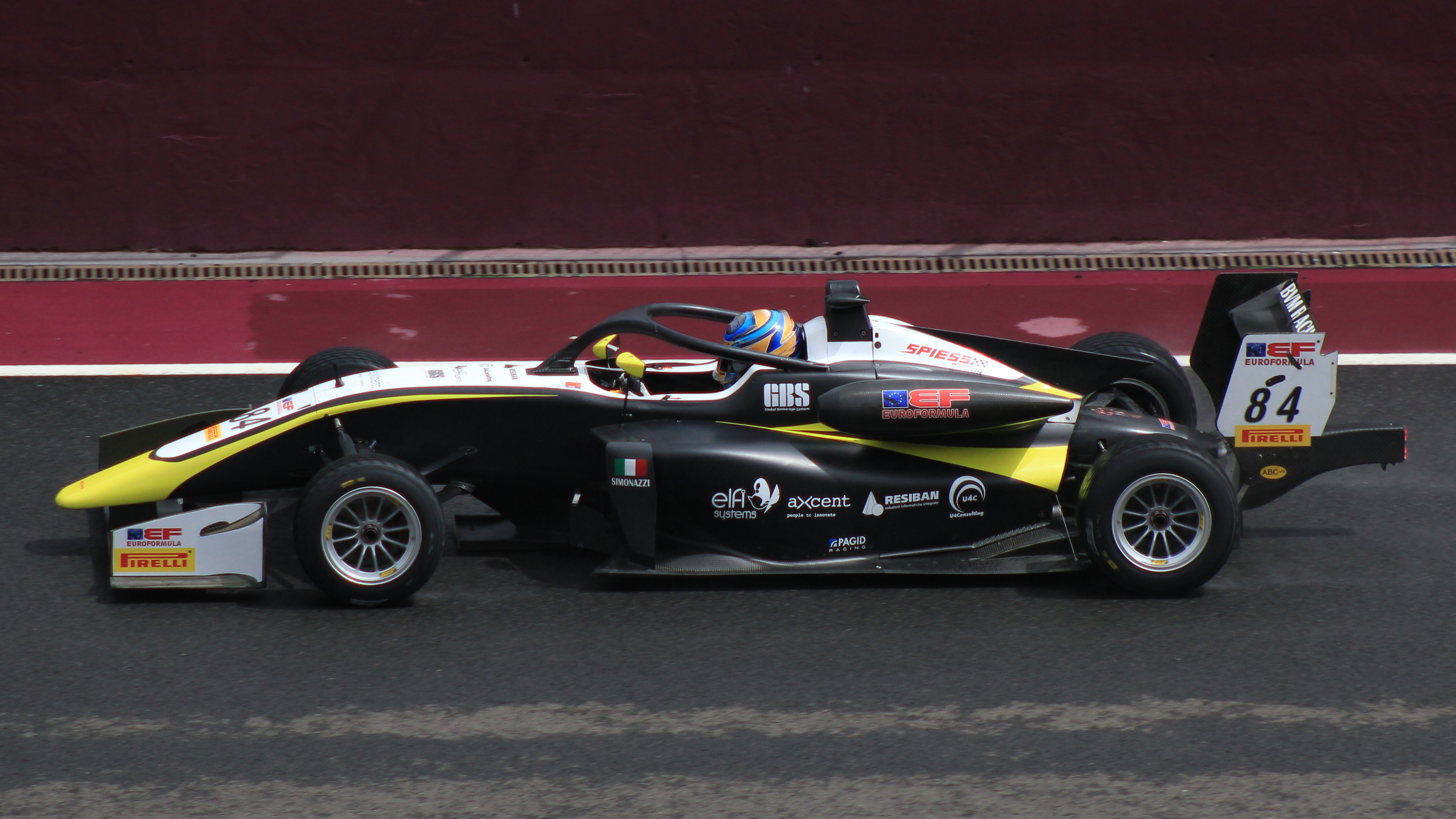
- Simonazzi in 2024
- Nationality: (Italy) Italian
- Born: 8 March 2004 (age 22) Reggio Emilia, Italy

European Le Mans Series career
- Debut season: 2025
- Current team: Duqueine Team
- Categorisation: FIA Silver
- Car number: 30
- Starts: 3 (3 entries)
- Wins: 0
- Podiums: 0
- Poles: 0
- Fastest laps: 0
- Best finish: 16th in 2025

Previous series
- 2021–2024 2019–2021 2020: Euroformula Open Championship; Italian F4 Championship; F4 Spanish Championship

Francesco Simonazzi (born 8 March 2004) is an Italian racing driver who competes in the 2025 European Le Mans Series for Duqueine Team. He previously competed in the Euroformula Open Championship with BVM Racing from 2021 to 2024, finishing runner-up in the latter season.

== Junior racing career ==
=== Lower formulae ===
==== 2019 ====
In 2019, Simonazzi made his car racing debut, competing in the Italian F4 Championship with Cram Motorsport. He experienced a challenging rookie year, scoring points on just one occasion, with an eighth place coming at Imola. Simonazzi missed the final two rounds of the season, which meant that he ended up 22nd in the standings.

==== 2020 ====
Simonazzi returned to Italian F4 for 2020, contesting the first round for DRZ Benelli. Having scored two points in a pair of appearances for Jenzer Motorsport, which also included a one-off start in Spanish F4, where he took the first podium of his career, Simonazzi drove for BVM Racing in the remaining half of the Italian F4 campaign. More points finishes followed, as the Italian finished 18th in the championship with a best result of sixth at the season finale at Vallelunga.

==== 2021 ====
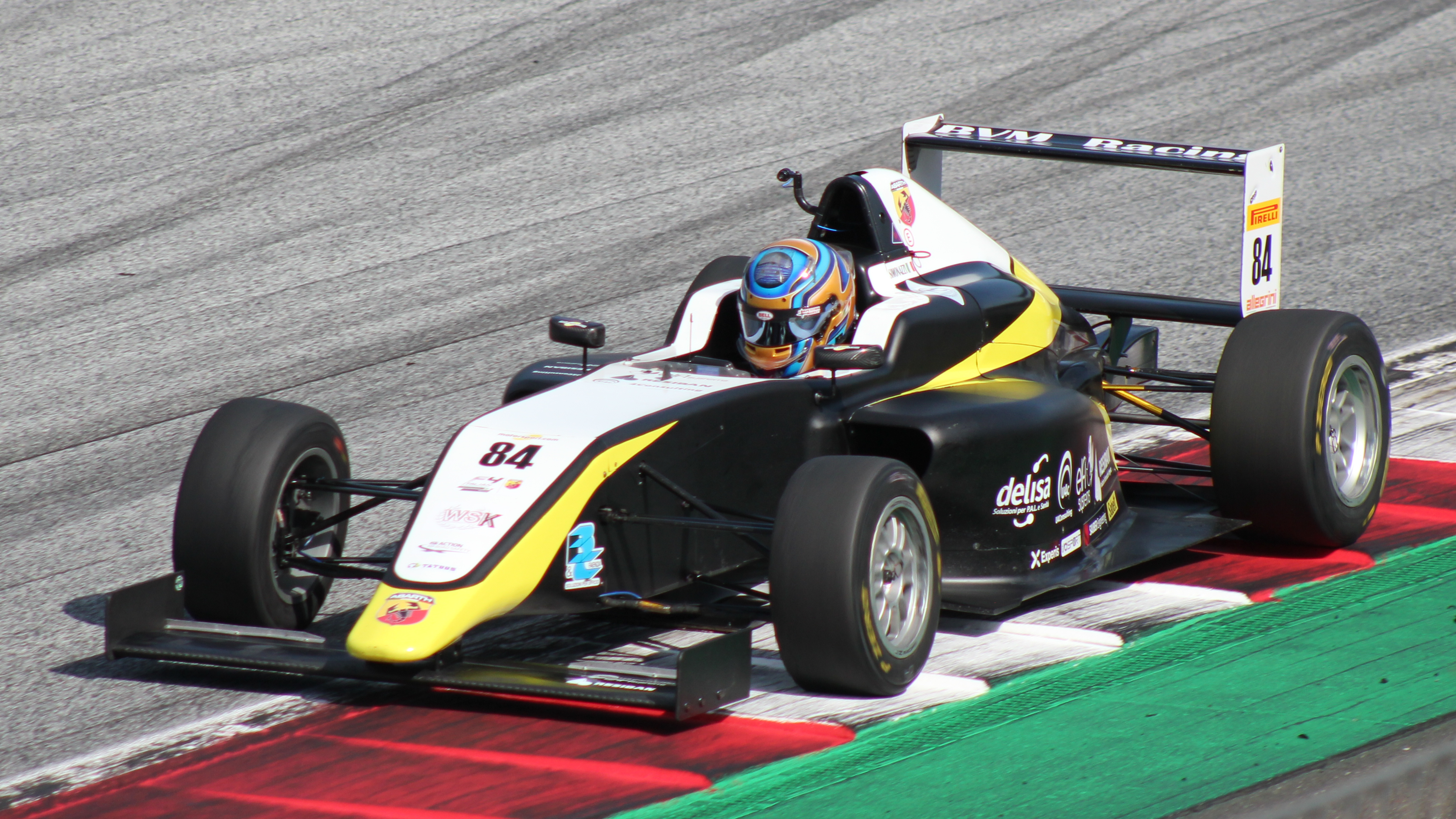
Simonazzi racing att the Red Bull Ring during the 2021 Italian F4 Championship

The following year, Simonazzi once again raced in the Italian F4 Championship. He remained with BVM and scored 28 points, having competed in merely four of the seven rounds, which left him 14th at season's end.

Simonazzi also made an appearance in the F2000 Italian Formula Trophy during 2021, scoring his first two victories in car racing.

=== Euroformula Open ===
==== 2021 ====
In 2021, Simonazzi spearheaded BVM's return to the Euroformula Open Championship, racing in the final two rounds at Monza and Barcelona. With the former event yielding a triple of points finishes, Simonazzi was classified 18th in the standings.

==== 2022 ====
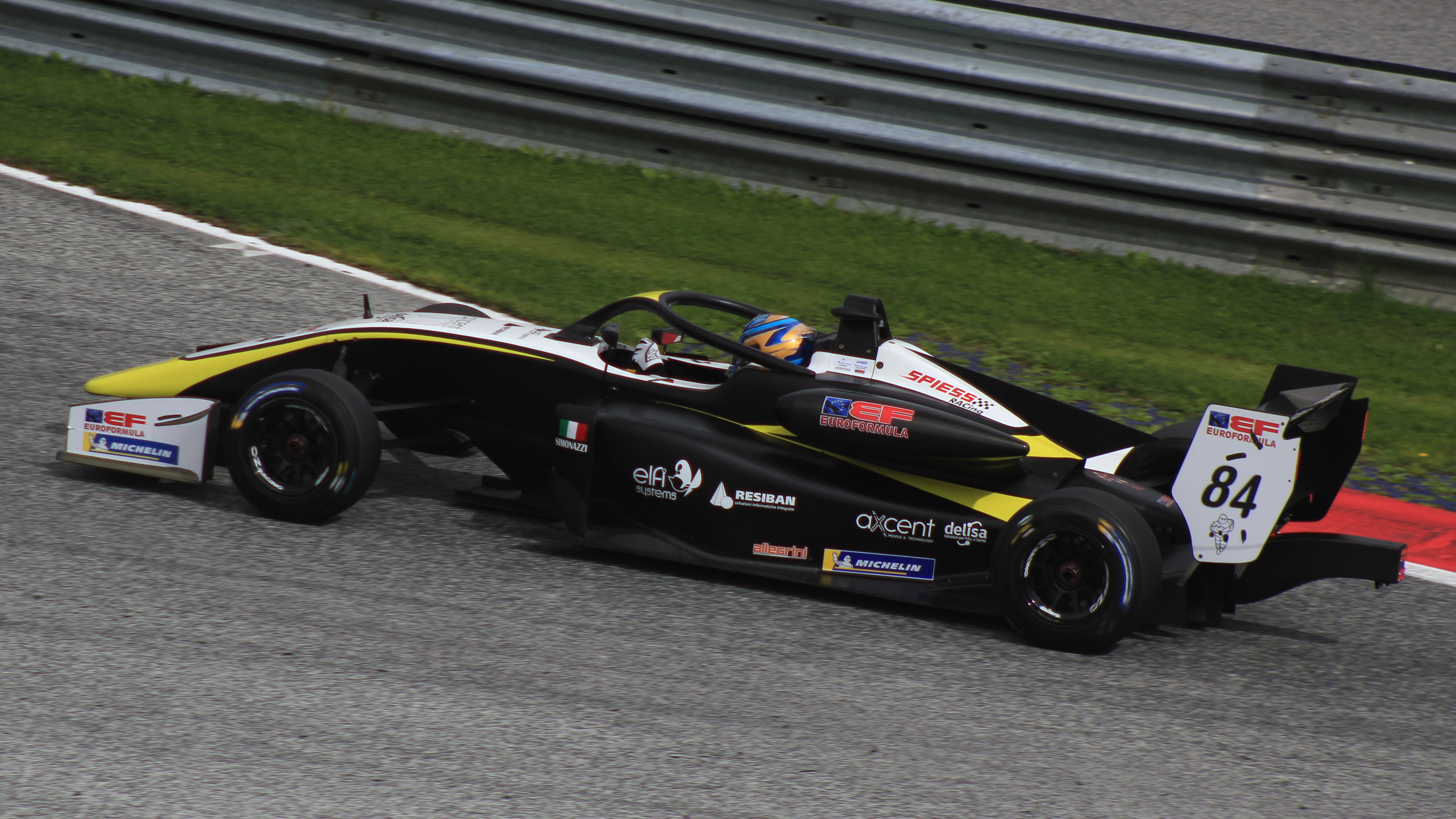
Simonazzi racing in the 2022 Euroformula Open at the Red Bull Ring.

Simonazzi returned to the series for the 2022 season, being the sole driver for BVM Racing once more. Despite low grid numbers, he struggled in the opening rounds, having to wait until the middle of the season for his first podium, which he scored at the Hungaroring. The biggest success of his season would follow just two rounds later, as, after finishing second in Race 2, Simonazzi scored his first win in the category at the Red Bull Ring, inheriting victory after original race winner Vladislav Lomko was awarded a five-second penalty for colliding with Frederick Lubin. A less successful weekend in Monza followed, which included Simonazzi causing a collision with Christian Mansell, which sent the latters car flipping upside down, before Simonazzi capped off his season by taking second place in Race 1 at Barcelona. This result meant that Simonazzi finished sixth in the standings, being the second-lowest full-time competitor in the standings, only ahead of Alex García.

==== 2023 ====
Simonazzi returned to the Euroformula Open in 2023, remaining with BVM Racing once more.

==== 2024 ====
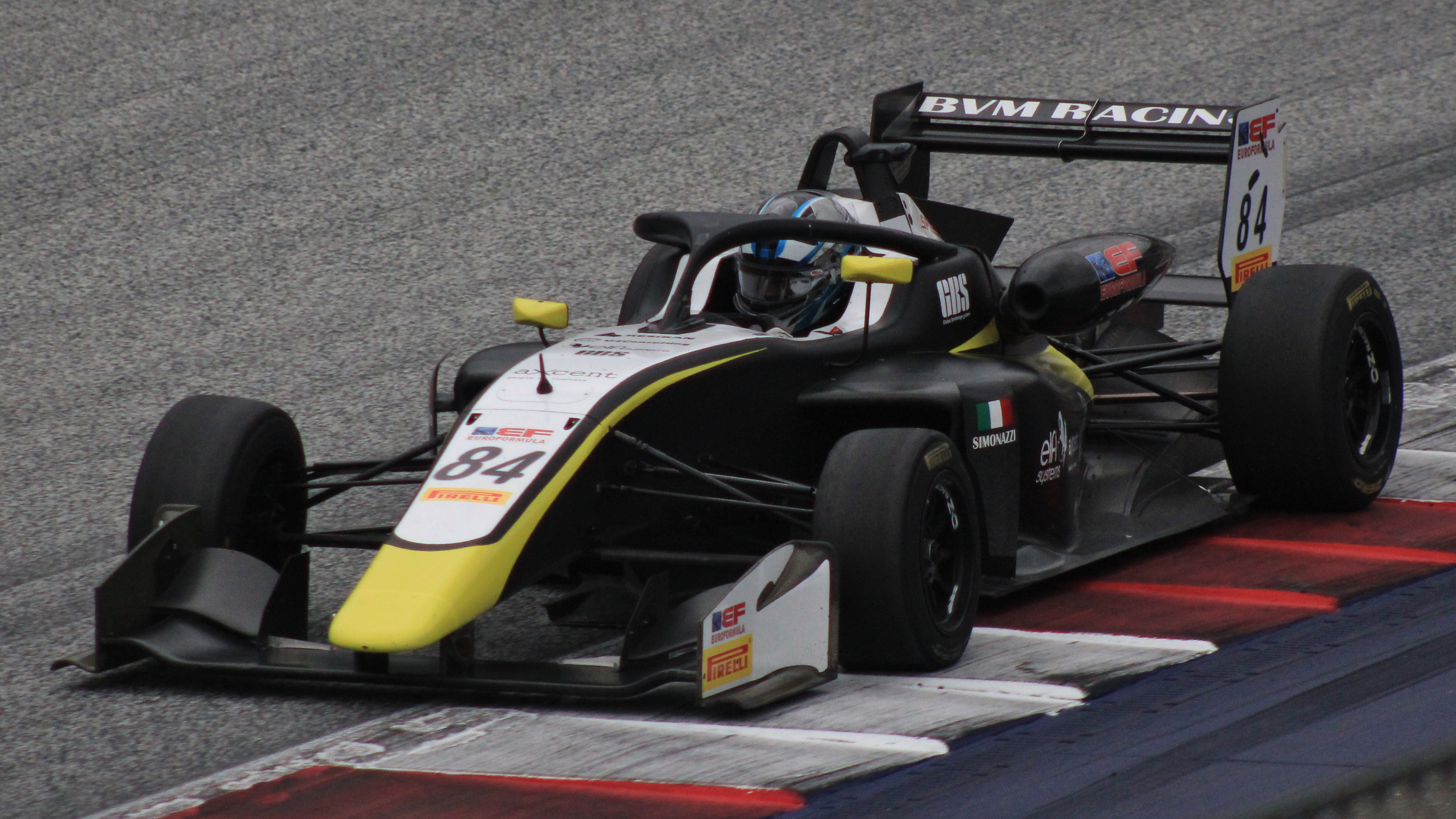
Simonazzi driving at the Red Bull Ring during the 2024 Euroformula Open

Simonazzi was retained by BVM Racing for a third season of Euroformula Open in 2024.

==== 2025 ====
Simonazzi opted not to continue in Euroformula Open in 2025, but remained in a developmental role for BVM Racing.

=== FIA Formula 3 Championship ===
Simonazzi was announced to race in the 2023 FIA Formula 3 Championship with Rodin Carlin for the final two rounds, replacing Max Esterson who returned to the GB3 Championship.

== Endurance racing career ==
=== 2025: ELMS debut ===
Simonazzi switched to the European Le Mans Series for 2025, joining French outfit Duqueine Team.

== Karting record ==
=== Karting career summary ===
Season	Series	Team	Position
2015	WSK Final Cup — 60 Mini	Evokart Srl	NC
2018	Andrea Margutti Trophy — X30 Senior		14th
2019	Italian Karting Championship — KZN Under		32nd

== Racing record ==
=== Racing career summary ===
Season	Series	Team	Races	Wins	Poles	F/Laps	Podiums	Points	Position
2019	Italian F4 Championship	Cram Motorsport	12	0	0	0	0	4	22nd
2020	Italian F4 Championship	DRZ Benelli	3	0	0	0	0	18	18th
2020	Italian F4 Championship	Jenzer Motorsport	6	0	0	0	0	18	18th
2020	Italian F4 Championship	BVM Racing	11	0	0	0	0	18	18th
2020	F4 Spanish Championship	Jenzer Motorsport	3	0	0	0	1	23	14th
2021	Italian F4 Championship	BVM Racing	12	0	0	0	0	28	14th
2021	Euroformula Open Championship	BVM Racing	6	0	0	0	0	15	18th
2021	F2000 Italian Formula Trophy - FX2	BVM Racing	2	2	2	2	2	0	NC†
2021	FIA Central European Zone Formula 4	BVM Racing	2	0	?	?	2	30	4th
2022	Euroformula Open Championship	BVM Racing	26	1	0	1	4	197	6th
2023	Euroformula Open Championship	BVM Racing	23	2	0	2	8	289	**3rd**
2023	F2000 Italian Formula Trophy	BVM Racing	2	2	2	2	2	0	NC†
2023	FIA Formula 3 Championship	Rodin Carlin	4	0	0	0	0	0	27th
2024	Euroformula Open Championship	BVM Racing	23	5	2	6	12	345	**2nd**
2024	Ultimate Cup Series - Proto P3	TS Corse	2	0	0	0	1	21	17th
2025	European Le Mans Series - LMP2	Duqueine Team	3	0	1	0	0	9	16th
2025	International GT Open	Oregon Team	3	0	0	0	0	7	27th
2026	GT World Challenge Europe Endurance Cup	Dinamic GT	5	0	0	0	0	1	32nd
2026	Italian GT Championship Endurance Cup - GT3	Dinamic GT	1	0	0	0	0	5	NC†

^{†} As Simonazzi was a guest driver, he was ineligible for points.
* Season still in progress.

=== Complete Italian F4 Championship results ===
(key) (Races in bold indicate pole position) (Races in italics indicate fastest lap)

Year	Team	1	2	3	4	5	6	7	8	9	10	11	12	13	14	15	16	17	18	19	20	21	22	Pos	Points
2019	Cram Motorsport	VLL; 1; 13	VLL; 2 Ret	VLL; 3; 15	MIS; 1; 13	MIS; 2; 14	MIS; 3 C	HUN; 1; 17	HUN; 2; 30	HUN; 3; 22	RBR; 1 WD	RBR; 2 WD	RBR; 3 WD	IMO; 1; 8	IMO; 2; 12	IMO; 3; 27	IMO; 4; 13	MUG; 1	MUG; 2	MUG; 3	MNZ; 1	MNZ; 2	MNZ; 3	22nd	4
2020	DRZ Benelli	MIS; 1; 11	MIS; 2; 12	MIS; 3 Ret																				18th	18
2020	Jenzer Motorsport				IMO1; 1; 13	IMO1; 2; 16	IMO1; 3 Ret	RBR; 1; 17	RBR; 2; 21	RBR; 3; 9														18th	18
2020	BVM Racing										MUG; 1; 12	MUG; 2; 7	MUG; 3; 9	MNZ; 1; 11	MNZ; 2; 14	MNZ; 3; 21	IMO2; 1; 16	IMO2; 2; 23	IMO2; 3; 15	VLL; 1; 6	VLL; 2 C	VLL; 3; 15		18th	18
2021	BVM Racing	LEC; 1; 14	LEC; 2; 9	LEC; 3; 9	MIS; 1	MIS; 2	MIS; 3	VLL; 1	VLL; 2	VLL; 3	IMO; 1	IMO; 2	IMO; 3	RBR; 1; 7	RBR; 2; 7	RBR; 3; 4	MUG; 1; 16	MUG; 2; 18	MUG; 3; 15	MNZ; 1; 26†	MNZ; 2; 11	MNZ; 3; 27		14th	28

=== Complete F4 Spanish Championship results ===
(key) (Races in bold indicate pole position) (Races in italics indicate fastest lap)

Year	Team	1	2	3	4	5	6	7	8	9	10	11	12	13	14	15	16	17	18	19	20	21	Pos	Points
2020	Jenzer Motorsport	NAV; 1	NAV; 2	NAV; 3	LEC; 1; 4	LEC; 2; 3	LEC; 3; 8	JER; 1	JER; 2	JER; 3	CRT; 1	CRT; 2	CRT; 3	ARA; 1	ARA; 2	ARA; 3	JAR; 1	JAR; 2	JAR; 3	CAT; 1	CAT; 2	CAT; 3	14th	23

=== Complete Euroformula Open Championship results ===
(key) (Races in bold indicate pole position; races in italics indicate points for the fastest lap of top ten finishers)

Year	Entrant	1	2	3	4	5	6	7	8	9	10	11	12	13	14	15	16	17	18	19	20	21	22	23	24	25	26	DC	Points
2021	BVM Racing	POR; 1	POR; 2	POR; 3	LEC; 1	LEC; 2	LEC; 3	SPA; 1	SPA; 2	SPA; 3	HUN; 1	HUN; 2	HUN; 3	IMO; 1	IMO; 2	IMO; 3	RBR; 1	RBR; 2	RBR; 3	MNZ; 1; 9	MNZ; 2; 10	MNZ; 3; 6*	CAT; 1; 16	CAT; 2; 12*	CAT; 3; 15			18th	15
2022	BVM Racing	EST; 1; 9	EST; 2; 6	EST; 3; 9	PAU; 1; 8*	PAU; 2 Ret	LEC; 1; 9	LEC; 2; 11	LEC; 3; 10	SPA; 1; 9	SPA; 2; 10	SPA; 3; 8	HUN; 1; 7	HUN; 2; 7	HUN; 3; 2*	IMO; 1; 4	IMO; 2; 4	IMO; 3; 6	RBR; 1; 7	RBR; 2; 2*	RBR; 3; 1	MNZ; 1; 4	MNZ; 2; 7	MNZ; 3; 7	CAT; 1; 2	CAT; 2; 8	CAT; 3; 6	6th	197
2023	BVM Racing	PRT; 1; 4	PRT; 2; 1	PRT; 3; 3	SPA; 1; 5	SPA; 2; 3	SPA; 3; 2	HUN; 1; 4	HUN; 2; 5	HUN; 3; 5	LEC; 1 Ret	LEC; 2; 3*	LEC; 3; 5	RBR; 1; 4*	RBR; 2; 2	RBR; 3; 5	MNZ; 1; 4*	MNZ; 2; 5	MNZ; 3; 4	MUG; 1; 2	MUG; 2; 5	CAT; 1; 4	CAT; 2; 5	CAT; 3; 1				3rd	289
2024	BVM Racing	**PRT**; **1**; 1	PRT; 2; 3	PRT; 3; 3*	HOC; 1; 6	HOC; 2; 1	HOC; 3; 2	**SPA**; **1**; 4	SPA; 2; 5	SPA; 3 DNS	HUN; 1; 6	HUN; 2; 1	HUN; 3; 1	LEC; 1; 5	LEC; 2; 3	LEC; 3; 4	RBR; 1; 4	RBR; 2; 3	RBR; 3; 3	CAT; 1; 5	CAT; 2; 1	CAT; 3; 6	MNZ; 1; 2	MNZ; 2 Ret	MNZ; 3; 5			2nd	345

=== Complete FIA Formula 3 Championship results ===
(key) (Races in bold indicate pole position) (Races in italics indicate fastest lap)

Year	Entrant	1	2	3	4	5	6	7	8	9	10	11	12	13	14	15	16	17	18	DC	Points
2023	Rodin Carlin	BHR; SPR	BHR; FEA	MEL; SPR	MEL; FEA	MON; SPR	MON; FEA	CAT; SPR	CAT; FEA	RBR; SPR	RBR; FEA	SIL; SPR	SIL; FEA	HUN; SPR	HUN; FEA	SPA; SPR; 14	SPA; FEA; 24	MNZ; SPR; 18	MNZ; FEA; 11	26th	0

=== Complete European Le Mans Series results ===
(key) (Races in bold indicate pole position; results in italics indicate fastest lap)

Year	Entrant	Class	Chassis	Engine	1	2	3	4	5	6	Rank	Points
2025	Duqueine Team	LMP2	Oreca 07	Gibson GK428 4.2 L V8	**CAT**; Ret	LEC; 7	IMO; 9	SPA	SIL	ALG	16th	9

=== Complete GT World Challenge Europe results ===
==== GT World Challenge Europe Endurance Cup ====
(key) (Races in bold indicate pole position) (Races in italics indicate fastest lap)

Year	Team	Car	Class	1	2	3	4	5	6	7	Pos.	Points
2026	Dinamic GT	Porsche 911 GT3 R (992.2)	Silver	LEC; 37	MNZ; 10	SPA; 6H; 48	SPA; 12H; 35	SPA; 24H; 25	NÜR; 43	ALG; Ret	22nd	20
