= 2025 NASCAR Brasil Series =

Brazilian auto racing season

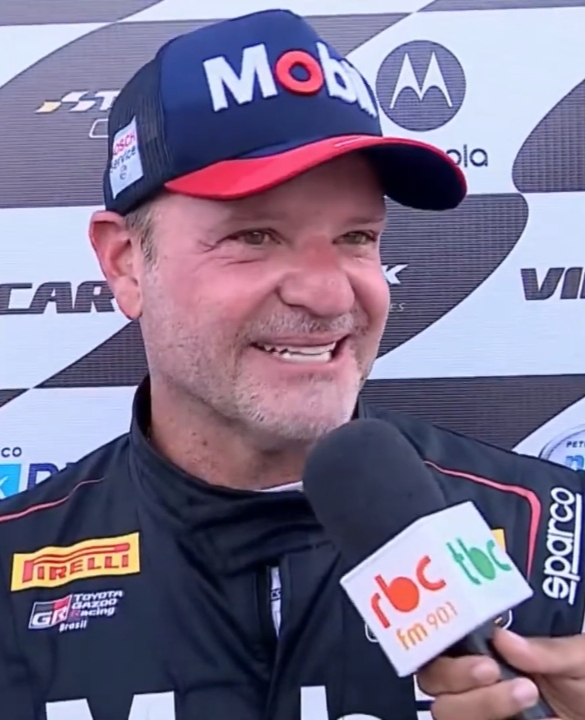
Rubens Barrichello was the "Brazilian Champion" and "Overall Champion" gaining the two main championships of 2025 Nascar Brasil season.

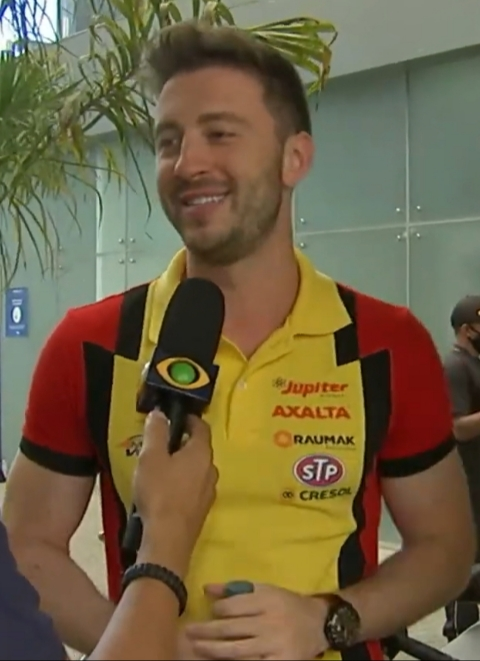
Gabriel Casagrande won the "Special Edition" championship which consisted in the last three rounds of the season

The 2025 NASCAR Brasil Series was the third season of the NASCAR Brasil Series after the rebrand of "Sprint Race" Series. It consisted of 9 rounds starting on March 22 in Autódromo Internacional Orlando Moura, Campo Grande and finished on December 7 in Autódromo José Carlos Pace, São Paulo. It was the last season with the 2020 generation of "Sprint Race" cars using V6 3.6L 300 hp engines, with the new car released for the 2026 season being launched in 2025. Following the 2024 changes, The PRO, PRO/AM and AM classes were changed by the NASCAR Brasil and NASCAR Challenge classes, were both classes run together and compete against each other, but drivers score points in their own class, both classes compete in a third championship together in the Overall championship.

The 2024 NASCAR Brasil champions Gabriel Casagrande and Alex Seid ran in separated cars after being a duo in the 2024 season, in 2025 Gabriel Casagrande did a solo campaign while Seid ran sharing a car with Júlio Campos. The Overall is considered the primary championship within the series and the winner driver is made present in the NASCAR Awards Banquet. Vitor Genz was the NASCAR Brasil sub-class champion while Victor Andrade got the NASCAR Challenge championship. For Special Edition championship, consisted by Interlagos and Circuito dos Cristais oval round in 2024, Gabriel Casagrande and Alex Seid were the champions, for 2025 it had an addition of one more round, consisting of three rounds with nine races.

In the 2025 season, Rubens Barrichello was crowned champion of the "Brazilian championship" after winning the first race in Velo Città round in August, with that he will be present in the NASCAR Awards Banquet together with other 2025 season NASCAR champions. Jorge Martelli was crowned the "Challenge" sub-class champion of the "Brazilian championship".

After the final round at Interlagos in December, Rubens Barrichello was crowned "Overall Champion" after beating Thiago Camilo, and with that he will put his name in the NASCAR Hall of Fame in Charlotte, North Carolina, while Jorge Martelli was the "Challenge overall champion". Gabriel Casagrande was the "Special Edition Champion" which consisted in the last three rounds in Curvelo, Autódromo Velo Città and Interlagos Circuit.

== Teams and drivers ==
In the 2025 all cars were run by private teams for the first time, moving on from the series operation since the Sprint Race era. Four teams was elected to run 6 cars each, with the teams being: Full Time Sports, R. Mattheis Motorsport, Team RC and MX Motorsports. In January MX Motorsport announced that will partner with the traditional Stock Car Pro Series team A.Mattheis Motorsport calling themselves MX Vogel. All teams run the same spec-car with aesthetics made to remember the Chevrolet Camaro and Ford Mustang body. For 2025, the Chevrolet Camaro body will switch from ZL1 to SS model.

NASCAR Brasil 2025 teams and drivers
Body Style	Team	No.	Driver	Rounds
Chevrolet Camaro	Team RC	0	(Brazil) Cacá Bueno	All
Chevrolet Camaro	Team RC	10	(Brazil) Adalberto Baptista	1, 3–8
Chevrolet Camaro	Team RC	10	(Brazil) Bruno Baptista	2
Chevrolet Camaro	Team RC	11	(Brazil) Witold Ramasauskas	All
Chevrolet Camaro	Team RC	57	(Brazil) Felipe Tozzo	All
Chevrolet Camaro	Team RC	87	(Brazil) Jorge Martelli	All
Chevrolet Camaro	Team RC	99	(Brazil) Galid Osman	All
Chevrolet Camaro	R.Mattheis Motorsport	1	(Brazil) Ricardo Zonta	2–9
Chevrolet Camaro	R.Mattheis Motorsport	3	(Brazil) Gianluca Petecof	1
Chevrolet Camaro	R.Mattheis Motorsport	4	(Brazil) Cayan Chianca	1–6
Chevrolet Camaro	R.Mattheis Motorsport	12	(Brazil) Emerson Reck	3–4
Chevrolet Camaro	R.Mattheis Motorsport	17	(Brazil) Pietro Rimbano	5–6
Chevrolet Camaro	R.Mattheis Motorsport	34	(Brazil) Dudes Castroneves	8–9
Chevrolet Camaro	R.Mattheis Motorsport	37	(Brazil) Raphael Teixeira	1–6
Chevrolet Camaro	R.Mattheis Motorsport	37	(Brazil) Daniel Mencacci	2
Chevrolet Camaro	R.Mattheis Motorsport	37	(Brazil) Pablo Marçal	3
Chevrolet Camaro	R.Mattheis Motorsport	39	(Brazil) Marcel Jorand	1
Chevrolet Camaro	R.Mattheis Motorsport	46	(Brazil) Vitor Genz	1–7
Chevrolet Camaro	R.Mattheis Motorsport	55	(Brazil) Brendon Zonta	7–8
Chevrolet Camaro	R.Mattheis Motorsport	56	(Brazil) Gabryel Romano	1–6
Chevrolet Camaro	R.Mattheis Motorsport	77	(Brazil) Valdeno Brito	7–9
Chevrolet Camaro	R.Mattheis Motorsport	78	(Brazil) Léo Yoshii	2
Chevrolet Camaro	R.Mattheis Motorsport	94	(Brazil) Luan Lopes	8
Chevrolet Camaro	R.Mattheis Motorsport	94	(Brazil) Vinny Azevedo	8-9
Chevrolet Camaro	R.Mattheis Motorsport	94	(Brazil) Leandro Parizotto	9
Ford Mustang	Full Time Sports	21	(Brazil) Thiago Camilo	All
Ford Mustang	Full Time Sports	8	(Brazil) Alfredinho Ibiapina	All
Ford Mustang	Full Time Sports	14	(Brazil) Thiago Lopes	1, 9
Ford Mustang	Full Time Sports	15	(Brazil) Tito Giaffone	All
Ford Mustang	Full Time Sports	22	(Brazil) Victor Andrade	All
Ford Mustang	Full Time Sports	22	(Brazil) Felipe Barrichelo Bartz	7
Ford Mustang	Full Time Sports	84	(Brazil) Vinícius Canhedo	2–7,9
Ford Mustang	Full Time Sports	91	(Brazil) Rubens Barrichello	1–3, 5–9
Ford Mustang	Full Time Sports	91	(Brazil) Eduardo Barrichello	9
Ford Mustang	Full Time Sports	95	(Brazil) Alceu Feldmann Neto	8
Ford Mustang	MX Vogel	5	(Brazil) Léo Torres	1–6
Ford Mustang	MX Vogel	6	(Portugal) Lourenço Beirão	2, 5, 7
Ford Mustang	MX Vogel	7	(Brazil) Julio Campos	All
Ford Mustang	MX Vogel	7	(Brazil) Alex Seid	All
Ford Mustang	MX Vogel	9	(Brazil) Nicholas Monteiro	1, 3–4, 6,
Ford Mustang	MX Vogel	16	(Brazil) Antonio Junqueira	1, 3–4, 6,8
Ford Mustang	MX Vogel	28	(Brazil) Guilherme "Gui" Backes	All
Ford Mustang	MX Vogel	44	(Brazil) João Barion	7
Ford Mustang	MX Vogel	51	(Brazil) Ricardo Rotilli	9
Ford Mustang	MX Vogel	76	(Brazil) Pedro Bezerra	8–9
Ford Mustang	MX Vogel	83	(Brazil) Gabriel Casagrande	All
Ford Mustang	MX Vogel	88	(Brazil) Beto Monteiro	2, 5

Notes:

Nascar Brasil Championship drivers
Challenge Championship drivers

== Schedule ==
The pre-calendar for the 2025 season of NASCAR Brazil was announced in November 16 starting March 30 and having the last round in December 7. On January 10, the first official calendar was announced with 9 rounds, one more than the 2024 season, and having 21 races in total. The Autódromo Internacional Orlando Moura will open the season on March 22 with the Autódromo José Carlos Pace being the last round of the season. The Brazilian championship will consist in 6 rounds with 2 races each and the "Special Edition" championship will consist in 3 rounds with 3 races each.

On February 11 the calendar was updated, the unannounced tracks were confirmed being Autódromo Internacional de Tarumã track in Viamão, and the Autódromo Internacional de Santa Cruz do Sul in Santa Cruz do Sul. As well were determined the Special edition rounds.

On May 19, Autódromo Velo Città was confirmed in place of the planned round on Autódromo Internacional de Santa Cruz do Sul.

Location of circuits scheduled to host a NASCAR Brasil Series round in 2025

Round	Track	Event name	Date
1	Autódromo Internacional Orlando Moura; Mato Grosso do Sul, Campo Grande		22–23 March
2	(Paraná (state)) Autódromo Internacional Ayrton Senna; Paraná, Londrina	#sunsetLondrina	12–13 April
3	(São Paulo (state)) Autódromo José Carlos Pace; São Paulo, São Paulo	#sprintrace	17–18 May
4	Autódromo Internacional de Tarumã; Rio Grande do Sul, Viamão	#inverserace	14–15 June
5	(Paraná (state)) Autódromo Internacional de Cascavel; Paraná, Cascavel	#100miles	11–12 July
6	(São Paulo (state)) Autódromo Velo Città; São Paulo, Mogi Guaçu	#matchpoint	23–24 August
7	Circuito dos Cristais; Minas Gerais, Curvelo	#ovaltrack	20–21 September
8	(São Paulo (state)) Autódromo Velo Città; São Paulo, Mogi Guaçu	#specialedition	1–2 November
9	(São Paulo (state)) Autódromo José Carlos Pace; São Paulo, São Paulo	#specialedition	6–7 December

Notes:

Brazilian Championship round
Special Edition round

== Results and standings ==
Bold indicates overall winner.

Circuit	Round	Race	Pole position	Fastest lap	NASCAR Brasil Winners	Challenge Winners
(Mato Grosso do Sul) Autódromo Internacional Orlando Moura	1	1	(Brazil) Vitor Genz	(Brazil) Cayan Chianca	**(Brazil) Vitor Genz**	(Brazil) Jorge Martelli
(Mato Grosso do Sul) Autódromo Internacional Orlando Moura	1	2	(Brazil) Cacá Bueno	(Brazil) Gabriel Casagrande	**(Brazil) Jorge Martelli**	**(Brazil) Jorge Martelli**
(Paraná (state)) Autódromo Internacional Ayrton Senna	2	3	(Brazil) Bruno Baptista	(Brazil) Thiago Camilo	(Brazil) **Thiago Camilo**	(Brazil) Alfredinho Ibiapina
(Paraná (state)) Autódromo Internacional Ayrton Senna	2	4	(Brazil) Gabriel Casagrande	(Brazil) Cacá Bueno	(Brazil) **Léo Torres**	(Brazil) Alfredinho Ibiapina
(São Paulo (state)) Autódromo José Carlos Pace	3	5	(Brazil) Thiago Camilo	(Brazil) Galid Osman	**(Brazil) Rubens Barrichello**	(Brazil) Felipe Tozzo
(São Paulo (state)) Autódromo José Carlos Pace	3	6	(Brazil) Thiago Camilo	(Brazil) Cacá Bueno	**(Brazil) Rubens Barrichello**	(Brazil) Gabryel Romano
(Rio Grande do Sul) Autódromo Internacional de Tarumã	4	7	(Brazil) Galid Osman	(Brazil) Léo Torres	**(Brazil) Jorge Martelli**	**(Brazil) Jorge Martelli**
(Rio Grande do Sul) Autódromo Internacional de Tarumã	4	8	(Brazil) Júlio Campos/Alex Seid	(Brazil) Jorge Martelli	**(Brazil) Jorge Martelli**	**(Brazil) Jorge Martelli**
(Paraná (state)) Autódromo Internacional de Cascavel	5	9	(Brazil) Rubens Barrichello	(Brazil) Cayan Chianca	**(Brazil) Rubens Barrichello**	(Brazil) Alfredinho Ibiapina
(Paraná (state)) Autódromo Internacional de Cascavel	5	10	-	(Brazil) Cayan Chianca	**(Brazil) Thiago Camilo**	(Brazil) Gabryel Romano
(São Paulo (state)) Autódromo Velo Città	6	11	(Brazil) Thiago Camilo	(Brazil) Cacá Bueno	**(Brazil) Rubens Barrichello**	(Brazil) Jorge Martelli
(São Paulo (state)) Autódromo Velo Città	6	12	(Brazil) Rubens Barrichello	(Brazil) Rubens Barrichello	**(Brazil) Rubens Barrichello**	(Brazil) Alfredinho Ibiapina
(Minas Gerais) Circuito dos Cristais	7	13	(Brazil) Jorge Martelli	(Brazil) Jorge Martelli	-	**(Brazil) Alfredinho Ibiapina**
(Minas Gerais) Circuito dos Cristais	7	14	(Brazil) Gabriel Casagrande	(Brazil) Rubens Barrichello	**(Brazil) Gabriel Casagrande**	-
(Minas Gerais) Circuito dos Cristais	7	15	(Brazil) Gabriel Casagrande	(Brazil) Cacá Bueno	**(Brazil) Galid Osman (Note: The duo Júio Campos/Alex Seid were the winners of Curvelo round after an 7 seconds punishment for Galid Osman, but after an judicial decision to revert the driver punishment he retook back his win)**	**(Brazil) Jorge Martelli**
(São Paulo (state)) Autódromo Velo Città	8	16	(Brazil) Tito Giaffone	(Brazil) Thiago Camilo	**(Brazil) Cacá Bueno**	(Brazil) Tito Giaffone
(São Paulo (state)) Autódromo Velo Città	8	17	(Brazil) Gabriel Casagrande	(Brazil) Ricardo Zonta	**(Brazil) Gabriel Casagrande**	(Brazil) Jorge Martelli
(São Paulo (state)) Autódromo Velo Città	8	18	(Brazil) Thiago Camilo	(Brazil) Gabriel Casagrande	**(Brazil) Gabriel Casagrande**	(Brazil) "Gui" Backes
(São Paulo (state)) Autódromo José Carlos Pace	9	19	(Brazil) Rubens Barrichello	(Brazil) "Gui" Backes	**(Brazil) Gabriel Casagrande**	(Brazil) "Gui" Backes
(São Paulo (state)) Autódromo José Carlos Pace	9	20	(Brazil) Cacá Bueno	(Brazil) Rubens Barrichello	**(Brazil) Rubens Barrichello**	(Brazil) Jorge Martelli
(São Paulo (state)) Autódromo José Carlos Pace	9	21	(Brazil) Gabriel Casagrande	(Brazil) Ricardo Zonta	**(Brazil) Vitor Genz**	(Brazil) "Gui" Backes

Notes:

Brazilian Championship round
Special Edition round

Brazilian championship points

Races	Position, points per race											
Races	1st	2nd	3rd	4th	5th	6th	7th	8th	9th	10th	11th	12th
Races 1 & Race 2	25	20	16	14	12	10	8	6	4	3	2	1
Superpole	5	4	3	2	1	0						
#Inverse Race and #Matchpoint Qualy	25	20	16	14	12	10	8	6	4	3	2	1

Note: In Tarumã "Inverse Race" and Velo Città "Matchpoint" qualy points are awarded the same way as Race 1 and Race 2 results.

Special edition points

Races	Position, points per race																	
Races	1st	2nd	3rd	4th	5th	6th	7th	8th	9th	10th	11th	12th	13th	14th	15th	16th	17th	18th
Race 1 & Race 2 and Qualy Races	18	17	16	15	14	13	12	11	10	9	8	7	6	5	4	3	2	1
Race 3 & Stage 2	25	20	16	14	12	10	8	6	4	3	2	1	0					

Notes:

Bold- Pole position awarded by fastest qualifying time. †– Drivers did not finish the race, but were classified as they completed more than 75% of the race distance. 1 2 3 4 5 6 7 8 9 10 11 12 - Superpole position.

Pos	Driver	(Mato Grosso do Sul) CAM		(Paraná (state)) LON		(São Paulo (state)) INT1		(Rio Grande do Sul) TAR		(Paraná (state)) CAS		(São Paulo (state)) VEL1		(Minas Gerais) CUR				(São Paulo (state)) VEL2			(São Paulo (state)) INT2			Points
Pos	Driver	R1	R2	R1	R2	R1	R2	R1	R2	S1	S2	R1	R2	QR1	QR2	S1	S2	R1	R2	R3	R1	R2	R3	Points
Pos	Driver	NASCAR Brasil Championship																						
1	(Brazil) Rubens Barrichello	3	15	11	3^{2}	1	1^{4}	WD	WD	1	2	1^{2}	1		7	10	4	6	6	9	Ret	1	5	300
2	(Brazil) Thiago Camilo	Ret	11	1	15^{3}	**2**	**2^{1}**	19^{4}	DSQ	5	1	**11**^{1}	2		10	9	8	2	2	2	2	Ret	8	274
3	(Brazil) Cacá Bueno	13	**14**^{1}	9	10	8	8	2^{7}	Ret	Ret	4	2^{3}	3		3	5	3	1	9	4	4	4	3	252
4	(Brazil) Vitor Genz	**1**	3^{3}	Ret	Ret	6	4	8^{2}	Ret	6	3	4^{8}	Ret		Ret	11	7	9	8	5	3	2	1	247
5	(Brazil) Gabriel Casagrande	2	16^{†}	2	**Ret**^{1}	11	7	4	10	2	11	Ret	Ret		1	1	Ret	5	**1**	**1**	1	3	2	241
6	(Brazil) Galid Osman	Ret	10^{2}	3	2^{4}	4	12	**9^{1}**	2	4	5	8	7		2	2	1	7	12	12	15	10	22	240
7	(Brazil) Jorge Martelli	4	1^{5}	8	Ret	13	Ret	1^{11}	1	10	14	3	12	6		15	5	8	3	17	9	7	14	194
8	(Brazil) Alfredinho Ibiapina	7	Ret	4	5	16	13^{5}	18^{8}	4	7	Ret	Ret^{6}	6	1		3	6	12	13	7	8	8	9	172
9	(Brazil) Victor Andrade	Ret	Ret	6	4	10	3^{3}	12^{6}	3	3	15	Ret^{7}	14			8	15	14	Ret	18	5	Ret	6	146
10	(Brazil) "Gui" Backes	6	6	10	14	21	19	20^{12}	9	14	9	Ret^{5}	8	3		18	Ret	10	7	6	6	11	4	133
11	(Brazil) Léo Torres	5	9	18	1	7	6^{2}	3^{10}	5	12	6	5	5											129
12	(Brazil) Witold Ramasauskas	Ret	5	5	8	5	5	10	Ret	16	19	16^{11}	4		8	16	Ret	20	10	8	Ret	5	12	117
13	(Brazil) Felipe Tozzo	10	7	7	9	9	20	5^{9}	5	15	17	Ret^{4}	13	2		4	9	16	19	20	11	9	15	115
14	(Brazil) Júlio Campos/Alex Seid	8	12	Ret	Ret	12	Ret	6^{5}	**Ret**	20	Ret	7	Ret		5	7	2	4	11	10	Ret	Ret	10	115
15	(Brazil) Ricardo Zonta			16	12	15	21	11	14	8	7	9^{12}	10		6	13	11	11	4	Ret	Ret	6	7	88
16	(Brazil) Tito Giaffone	9	13	13	11	Ret	16	Ret	7	11	10	6^{9}	17	4		12	10	**3**	17	11	12	Ret	13	84
17	(Brazil) Valdeno Brito														4	6	12	Ret	5	3	7	15	11	77
18	(Brazil) Adalberto Baptista	17	8			20	14	14	13	17	16	10	16	5		17	14	21	21	Ret	10	13	20	41
19	(Brazil) Cayan Chianca	19^{†}	Ret^{4}	14	Ret^{5}	3	Ret	17^{3}	11	18	Ret	WD	WD											37
20	(Brazil) Antonio Junqueira	11	2			Ret	10	Ret	8			14	11					19	15	14				36
21	(Brazil) Felipe Barrichello Bartz														9	8	15							21
22	(Brazil) Gabryel Romano	14	18^{†}	Ret	16	14	9	15	6	13	8	Ret	Ret											20
23	(Brazil) Eduardo Barrichello																				Ret	1		18
24	(Brazil) João Barion														7	14	16							17
25	(Brazil) Raphael Teixeira	18^{†}	4	-	DSQ	-	15	16	Ret	WD	WD	WD	WD											14
26	(Brazil) Dudes Castroneves																	13	16	16	13	Ret	17	14
27	(Brazil) Vinicius Canhedo			19	13	19	17	13	12	21	13	15	Ret	9		Ret	13				14	12	16	13
28	(Brazil) Vinny Azevedo																	17	22	19	16	17	18	13
29	(Brazil) Beto Monteiro			15	6					Ret	12													11
29	(Brazil) Nick Monteiro	12	Ret			18	11	7	Ret			12	15											11
31	(Brazil) Brendon Zonta													7		19	17	18	18	13				11
32	(Brazil) Pietro Rimbano									9	18	13^{10}	9											11
33	(Brazil) Pedro Bezerra																	15	20	15	17	14	Ret	9
34	(Portugal) Lourenço Beirão			Ret	7					19	Ret				Ret	20	18							8
35	(Brazil) Luan Lopes																	17	22	19				8
36	(Brazil) Alceu Feldmann Neto																	Ret	14	DSQ				5
37	(Brazil) Leandro Parizoto																				16	17	18	5
38	(Brazil) Ricardo Rotilli																				Ret	16	19	3
39	(Brazil) Bruno Baptista			**12**	Ret																			1
40	(Brazil) Thiago Lopes	15	17^{†}																		DNS	Ret	21	0
41	(Brazil) Marcel Jorand	16	19^{†}																					0
42	(Brazil) Léo Yoshii			17	17																			0
43	(Brazil) Emerson Rack					17	18	WD	WD															0
44	(Brazil) Daniel Mencacci			20	-																			0
45	(Brazil) Gianluca Petecof	Ret	Ret																					0
46	(Brazil) Pablo Marçal					Ret	-																	0
Challenge Championship
1	(Brazil) Jorge Martelli	1	1	3	Ret	2	Ret	1^{3}	1	2	5	1^{5}	3	6		5	1	2	1	8	3	1	4	356
2	(Brazil) Alfredinho Ibiapina	3	Ret	1	1	4	4	**7^{1}**	2	1	Ret	Ret^{3}	1	1		1	2	5	3	2	2	2	2	354
3	(Brazil) "Gui" Backes	2	3	4	5	9	9	8^{4}	7	5	2	Ret^{2}	2	3		7	Ret	3	2	1	1	4	1	293
4	(Brazil) Felipe Tozzo	5	4	2	2	1	10	2^{2}	3	6	7	Ret^{1}	5	2		2	3	7	9	10	5	3	5	277
5	(Brazil) Tito Giaffone	4	6	6	3	Ret	6	Ret^{7}	5	3	3	2^{4}	8	4		3	4	1	7	3	6	Ret	3	240
6	(Brazil) Adalberto Baptista	11	5			8	5	5^{9}	9	7	6	3^{6}	7	5		6	6	11	11	11	4	6	10	175
7	(Brazil) Vinicius Canhedo			8	4	7	7	4^{5}	8	8	4	6	Ret	9		Ret	5				8	5	6	154
8	(Brazil) Gabryel Romano	8	8	Ret	6	3	1	6^{6}	4	4	1	Ret^{9}	Ret											139
9	(Brazil) Antonio Junqueira	6	2			Ret	2	Ret^{8}	6			5^{7}	4					10	5	5				110
10	(Brazil) Nick Monteiro	7	Ret			6	3	3	Ret			4^{8}	6											90
11	(Brazil) Dudes Castroneves																	6	6	7	7	Ret	7	38
12	(Brazil) Pedro Bezerra																	8	10	6	10	7	Ret	35
13	(Brazil) Brendon Zonta													8		8	8	9	8	4				34
14	(Brazil) Vinny Azevedo																	4	12	9	9	Ret	8	34
15	(Brazil) João Barion													7		4	7							25
16	(Brazil) Emerson Rack					5	8																	18
17	(Brazil) Léo Yoshii			7	7																			16
18	(Brazil) Ricardo Rotilli																				Ret	8	9	15
19	(Brazil) Luan Lopes																	4	12	9				14
20	(Brazil) Thiago Lopes	9	7																		DNS	Ret	11	14
20	(Brazil) Bruno Baptista			5	Ret																			12
22	(Brazil) Marcel Jorand	10	9																					7
23	(Brazil) Alceu Feldmann Neto																	Ret	4	DSQ				5

== See also ==
- 2025 NASCAR Cup Series
- 2025 NASCAR Xfinity Series
- 2025 NASCAR Craftsman Truck Series
- 2025 ARCA Menards Series
- 2025 ARCA Menards Series East
- 2025 ARCA Menards Series West
- 2025 NASCAR Whelen Modified Tour
- 2025 NASCAR Canada Series
- 2025 NASCAR Mexico Series
- 2025 NASCAR Euro Series
- 2025 CARS Tour
- 2025 SMART Modified Tour
