= Filippo Fiorentino =

Brazilian racing driver (born 2008)

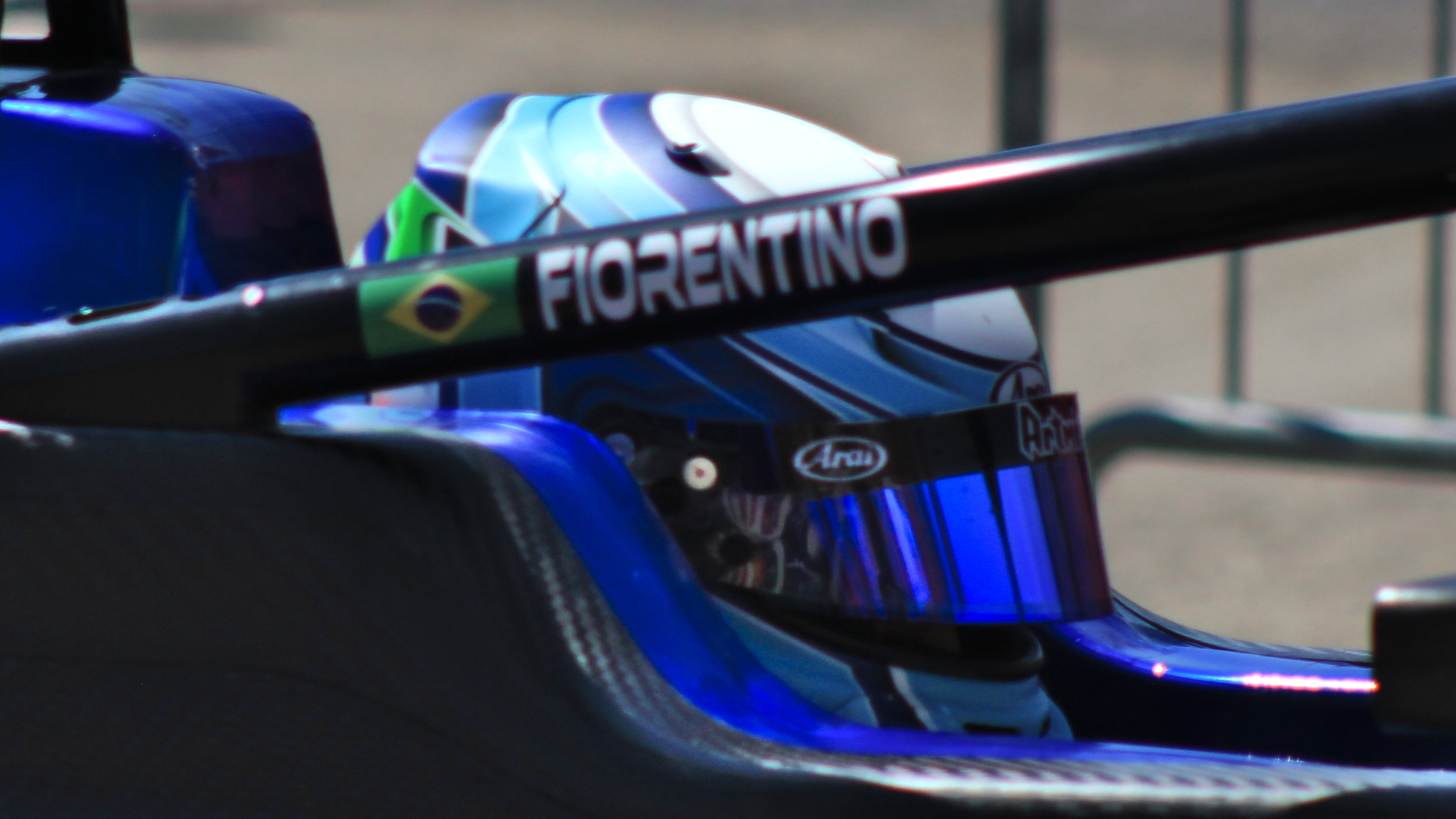
- Fiorentino in 2024
- Nationality: (Brazil) Brazilian
- Born: Filippo Schulze Blanck Fiorentino; 8 August 2008 (age 18) São Paulo, Brazil

Eurocup-3 career
- Debut season: 2025
- Current team: Drivex
- Car number: 37
- Starts: 23
- Wins: 0
- Podiums: 0
- Poles: 0
- Fastest laps: 0
- Best finish: 20th in 2026

Previous series
- 2026 2026 2025 2024–2025 2024 2024 2023–2025 2023: Euroformula Open; F4 CEZ; Eurocup-4 Spanish Winter; F4 Brazilian; Italian F4; Formula Winter Series; F4 Spanish; Campeonato Paulista de Fórmula Delta

Filippo Schulze Blanck Fiorentino (born 8 August 2008) is a Brazilian racing driver who last competed in the Eurocup-3 for Drivex.

He previously competed in the F4 Spanish Championship from 2023 to 2025.

== Career ==
=== Formula 4 ===
==== 2023 ====
Fiorentino made his single-seater debut in 2023, racing in Formula Delta. After running on a part-time schedule and finishing eighth in points, Fiorentino joined Cram Motorsport to race in the final two rounds of the F4 Spanish Championship later that year. Competing as a guest driver, Fiorentino scored a best result of 18th in race three at Barcelona in the six races he started.

==== 2024 ====
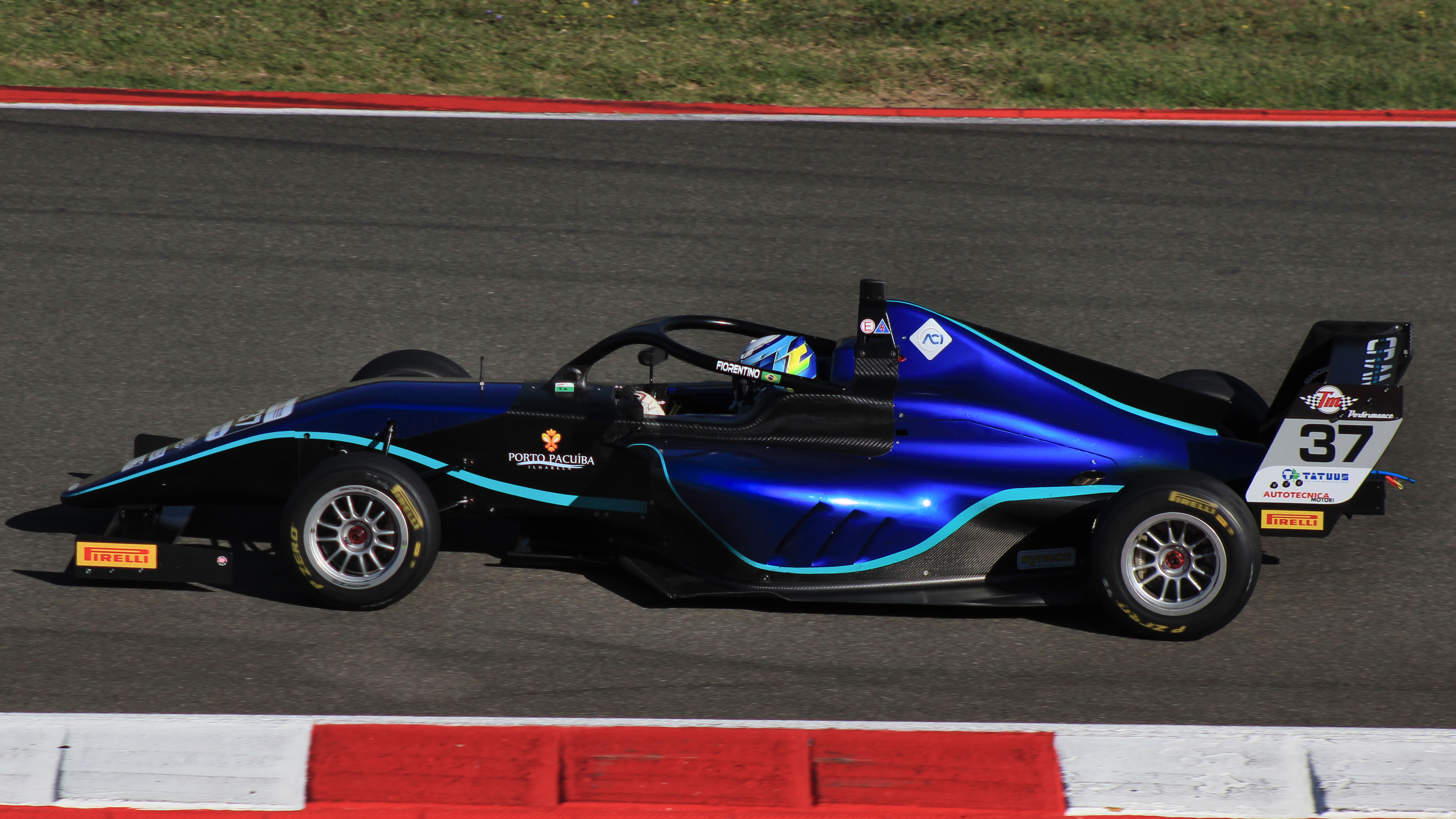
Fiorentino driving at the Mugello Circuit during the 2024 Italian F4 Championship

Remaining with Cram Motorsport for 2024, Fiorentino raced with them full-time in Formula Winter Series and F4 Spanish Championship, as well as select rounds of Italian F4. In the former, Fiorentino took a best result of 13th twice at both Valencia and Aragón en route to a 34th-place points finish. Meanwhile in Spanish F4, Fiorentino took a best result of 15th in race two at Valencia to likewise end the year 34th in points. Competing in just three rounds of Italian F4, Fiorentino scored a best result of 14th at Vallelunga on debut as the fourth-highest placed rookie in race one. In parallel, Fiorentino raced in the F4 Brazilian Championship for TMG Racing on a part-time basis, winning on debut at Interlagos, and scoring two further podiums to end the year tenth in points.

==== 2025 ====
Remaining in Europe the following year, Fiorentino joined Drivex for a dual campaign in the Eurocup-4 Spanish Winter Championship and the F4 Spanish Championship. In the three-round Winter Championship, Fiorentino scored a best result of fifth in race one at Algarve and achieved four more points finishes to end the season 14th in points. In the main series, Fiorentino took two tenth-place finishes at Jerez and Barcelona en route to a 20th-place points finish. Alongside his campaign in Europe, Fiorentino returned to TMG Racing for this sophomore season in the F4 Brazilian Championship. After missing the first round, Fiorentino scored two wins at Velo Città, before scoring two further wins at the Brazilian Grand Prix-supporting non-championship round at Interlagos, as well as three more podiums to finish the year fourth in points.

==== 2026 ====
During 2026, Fiorentino also briefly returned to F4 competition, racing in the Formula 4 CEZ Championship for Harp Racing at the season-opening Red Bull Ring round.

=== Formula Regional ===
==== 2025 ====
During 2025, Fiorentino competed with Drivex at the Assen and Spa rounds of Eurocup-3.

==== 2026 ====
Fiorentino remained with Drivex as he stepped up to Eurocup-3 full-time in 2026. Racing in the series' Winter Championship at the start of the year, Fiorentino scored points on five occasions, with a best result of fifth in race one at Algarve to end the season 16th in points. In the main series, Fiorentino took a best result of tenth at Le Castellet and Imola to end the season 20th overall. During 2026, Fiorentino also raced part-time in the Euroformula Open Championship with the team, in which he won race two at Le Castellet.

== Karting record ==
=== Karting career summary ===
Season	Series	Team	Position
2022	WSK Champions Cup – OK-J	CRG Racing Team	14th
2022	WSK Super Master Series – OK-J	CRG Racing Team	80th
2022	Champions of the Future Euro Series – OK-J	CRG Racing Team	74th
2022	Italian Karting Championship – X30 Senior	CRG Racing Team	NC
2022	WSK Euro Series – OK	CRG Racing Team	63rd
2022	Italian Karting Championship – OK	CRG Racing Team	25th
2022	Karting World Championship – OK	CRG Racing Team	NC
2023	South Garda Winter Cup – OK	CRG Racing Team	17th
2023	WSK Champions Cup – OK	CRG Racing Team	27th
2023	WSK Super Master Series – OK	CRG Racing Team	81st
2023	Karting European Championship – OK	CRG Racing Team	64th
2023	Champions of the Future Euro Series – OK	CRG Racing Team	132nd
2024	WSK Champions Cup – KZ2	CRG Racing Team	NC
2024	WSK Super Master Series – KZ2	CRG Racing Team	75th
2024	Champions of the Future Euro Series – KZ2	CRG Racing Team	NC
2024	Karting World Cup – KZ2	CRG Racing Team	NC

== Racing record ==
=== Racing career summary ===
Season	Series	Team	Races	Wins	Poles	F/Laps	Podiums	Points	Position
2023	Campeonato Paulista de Fórmula Delta		4	0	0	0	0	22	8th
2023	F4 Spanish Championship	Cram Motorsport	6	0	0	0	0	0	NC†
2024	Formula Winter Series	Cram Motorsport	11	0	0	0	0	0	34th
2024	F4 Spanish Championship	Cram Motorsport	18	0	0	0	0	0	34th
2024	Italian F4 Championship	Cram Motorsport	9	0	0	0	0	0	36th
2024	F4 Brazilian Championship	TMG Racing	12	1	0	1	3	105	10th
2025	F4 Brazilian Championship	TMG Racing	15	2	1	1	5	159	4th
2025	Eurocup-4 Spanish Winter Championship	Drivex	9	0	0	0	0	23	14th
2025	F4 Spanish Championship	Drivex	21	0	0	0	0	3	20th
2025	Eurocup-3	Drivex	4	0	0	0	0	0	38th
2026	Eurocup-3 Spanish Winter Championship	Drivex	9	0	0	0	0	10	16th
2026	Eurocup-3	Drivex	19	0	0	0	0	2	20th
2026	Formula 4 CEZ Championship	Harp Racing	3	0	0	0	0	8	40th
2026	Euroformula Open Championship	Drivex	6	1	0	0	1	46	12th

^{†} As Fiorentino was a guest driver, he was ineligible to score points.
* Season still in progress.

=== Complete F4 Spanish Championship results ===
(key) (Races in bold indicate pole position) (Races in italics indicate fastest lap)

Year	Team	1	2	3	4	5	6	7	8	9	10	11	12	13	14	15	16	17	18	19	20	21	DC	Points
2023	Cram Motorsport	SPA; 1	SPA; 2	SPA; 3	ARA; 1	ARA; 2	ARA; 3	NAV; 1	NAV; 2	NAV; 3	JER; 1	JER; 2	JER; 3	EST; 1	EST; 2	EST; 3	CRT; 1 Ret	CRT; 2; 29	CRT; 3; 25	CAT; 1; 31†	CAT; 2; 22	CAT; 3; 18	NC†	0
2024	Cram Motorsport	JAR; 1; 31	JAR; 2; 21	JAR; 3; 18	POR; 1; 21	POR; 2; 18	POR; 3; 20	LEC; 1; 22	LEC; 2; 17	LEC; 3 Ret	ARA; 1; 31	ARA; 2; 30	ARA; 3; 32	CRT; 1; 27	CRT; 2; 15	CRT; 3; 28	JER; 1; 21	JER; 2; 18	JER; 3; 27	CAT; 1	CAT; 2	CAT; 3	34th	0
2025	Drivex	ARA; 1; 29	ARA; 2; 17	ARA; 3; 23	NAV; 1; 15	NAV; 2; 13	NAV; 3; 21	POR; 1; 28†	POR; 2; 13	POR; 3; 12	LEC; 1; 24	LEC; 2; 30	LEC; 3; 13	JER; 1; 10	JER; 2; 17	JER; 3; 30†	CRT; 1; 24	CRT; 2; 15	CRT; 3; 27	CAT; 1; 10	CAT; 2 Ret	CAT; 3; 21	20th	3

^{†} As Fiorentino was a guest driver, he was ineligible to score points.

=== Complete Formula Winter Series results ===
(key) (Races in bold indicate pole position; races in italics indicate fastest lap)

Year	Team	1	2	3	4	5	6	7	8	9	10	11	12	DC	Points
2024	Cram Motorsport	JER; 1; 27	JER; 2 DSQ	JER; 3; 28	CRT; 1; 35	CRT; 2; 13	CRT; 3; 24	ARA; 1; 15	ARA; 2; 14	ARA; 3; 13	CAT; 1 C	CAT; 2; 24	CAT; 3; 29	34th	0

=== Complete F4 Brazilian Championship results ===
(key) (Races in bold indicate pole position; races in italics indicate fastest lap)

Year	Team	1	2	3	4	5	6	7	8	9	10	11	12	13	14	15	16	17	18	19	20	21	22	23	24	25	DC	Points
2024	TMG Racing	MGG1; 1	MGG1; 2	MGG1; 3	INT1; 1; 1	INT1; 2; 4	INT1; 3 Ret	MGG2; 1	MGG2; 2	MGG2; 3	GOI1; 1	GOI1; 2	GOI1; 3	BUA; 1	BUA; 2	BUA; 3	INT2; 1; 5	INT2; 2 C	INT2; 3; 6	GOI2; 1; 6	GOI2; 2; 3	GOI2; 3; 6	INT3; 1; 5	INT3; 2; 9	INT3; 3; 6	INT3; 4; 3	10th	105
2025	TMG Racing	INT1; 1	INT1; 2	INT1; 3	MGG1; 1; 1	MGG1; 2; 5	MGG1; 3; 3	MGG2; 1; 1	MGG2; 2; 8	MGG2; 3; 4	MGG3; 1; 2	MGG3; 2; 6	**MGG3**; **3**; 4	**INT2**; **1**; 1	INT2; 2; 2	**INT2**; **3**; 1	INT3; 1; 5	INT3; 2; 2	INT3; 3; 12	INT4; 1; 5	INT4; 2; 5	INT4; 3 Ret					4th	159

=== Complete Italian F4 Championship results ===
(key) (Races in bold indicate pole position; races in italics indicate fastest lap)

Year	Team	1	2	3	4	5	6	7	8	9	10	11	12	13	14	15	16	17	18	19	20	21	DC	Points
2024	Cram Motorsport	MIS; 1	MIS; 2	MIS; 3	IMO; 1	IMO; 2	IMO; 3	VLL; 1; 14	VLL; 2; 26	VLL; 3; 25	MUG; 1 Ret	MUG; 2 Ret	MUG; 3; 30	LEC; 1; 23	LEC; 2 Ret	LEC; 3; 23	CAT; 1	CAT; 2	CAT; 3	MNZ; 1	MNZ; 2	MNZ; 3	36th	0

=== Complete Eurocup-4 Spanish Winter Championship results ===
(key) (Races in bold indicate pole position; races in italics indicate fastest lap)

Year	Team	1	2	3	4	5	6	7	8	9	DC	Points
2025	Drivex	JER; 1; 10	JER; 2; 7	JER; 3 Ret	POR; 1; 5	POR; 2; 31†	POR; 3; 7	NAV; 1; 23	NAV; 2 Ret	NAV; 3; 9	14th	23

=== Complete Eurocup-3 results ===
(key) (Races in bold indicate pole position; races in italics indicate fastest lap)

Year	Team	1	2	3	4	5	6	7	8	9	10	11	12	13	14	15	16	17	18	19	DC	Points
2025	Drivex	RBR; 1	RBR; 2	POR; 1	POR; SR	POR; 2	LEC; 1	LEC; SR	LEC; 2	MNZ; 1	MNZ; 2	ASS; 1; 20	ASS; 2; 26†	SPA; 1; 24	SPA; 2; 22	JER; 1	JER; 2	CAT; 1	CAT; 2		38th	0
2026	Drivex	LEC; 1; 22	LEC; SR; 10	LEC; 2; 14	POR; 1; 17	POR; 2; 12	IMO; 1; 10	IMO; SR; Ret	IMO; 2; 16	MNZ; 1; 14	MNZ; 2 Ret	SIL; 1; 15	SIL; 2; 21	JER; 1; 16	JER; SR; 13	JER; 2; 21	HUN; 1; 13	HUN; 2; 16	CAT; 1; 12	CAT; 2; 15	20th	2

=== Complete Eurocup-3 Spanish Winter Championship results ===
(key) (Races in bold indicate pole position) (Races in italics indicate fastest lap)

Year	Team	1	2	3	4	5	6	7	8	9	DC	Points
2026	Drivex	POR; 1; 11	POR; SPR; 16	POR; 2; 9	JAR; 1; 6	JAR; SPR; 15	JAR; 2; 20	ARA; 1 Ret	ARA; SPR; 11	ARA; 2; 11	16th	10

=== Complete Formula 4 CEZ Championship results ===
(key) (Races in bold indicate pole position) (Races in italics indicate fastest lap)

Year	Team	1	2	3	4	5	6	7	8	9	10	11	12	13	14	15	16	17	18	19	20	21	22	23	24	DC	Points
2026	Harp Racing	RBR1; 1; 8	RBR1; 2; 20	RBR1; 3	RBR1; 4 Ret	SAL; 1	SAL; 2	SAL; 3	SAL; 4	SVK; 1	SVK; 2	SVK; 3	SVK; 4	MOS; 1	MOS; 2	MOS; 3	MOS; 4	BRN; 1	BRN; 2	BRN; 3	BRN; 4	HUN; 1	HUN; 2	HUN; 3	HUN; 4	40th	8

=== Complete Euroformula Open Championship results ===
(key) (Races in bold indicate pole position) (Races in italics indicate fastest lap)

Year	Entrant	1	2	3	4	5	6	7	8	9	10	11	12	13	14	15	16	17	18	19	20	21	22	23	24	DC	Points
2026	Drivex	PRT; 1	PRT; 2	PRT; 3	SPA; 1; 6	SPA; 2; 10	SPA; 3; 7	MIS; 1	MIS; 2	MIS; 3	HUN; 1	HUN; 2	HUN; 3	LEC; 1; 8	LEC; 2; 1	LEC; 3; 9	HOC; 1	HOC; 2	HOC; 3	MNZ; 1	MNZ; 2	MNZ; 3	CAT; 1	CAT; 2	CAT; 3	12th	46
