= Heitor Dall'Agnol =

Brazilian racing driver (born 2009)

- Nationality: (Brazil) Brazilian
- Born: Heitor Dall'Agnol Farias; 20 August 2009 (age 17) Passo Fundo, Rio Grande do Sul, Brazil

Eurocup-3 career
- Debut season: 2025
- Current team: Palou Motorsport
- Car number: 27
- Starts: 19
- Wins: 2
- Podiums: 8
- Poles: 0
- Fastest laps: 2
- Best finish: 3rd in 2025

Previous series
- 2026 2025: Eurocup-3 Spanish Winter; F4 Brazilian
- Statistics up to date as of 17 November 2026.

Heitor Dall'Agnol Farias (born 20 August 2009) is a Brazilian racing driver who last competed in Eurocup-3 for Palou Motorsport.

He is the 2025 F4 Brazilian champion and finished third in the 2026 Eurocup-3 season.

== Career ==
=== Karting ===
Dall'Agnol began karting at the age of four and his first year of competitive karting was in 2016, winning the Rio Grande do Sul Cup and State Championship, South Brazilian Championship, and became the runner-up of the Copa São Paulo Light Cup. From 2017 to 2019, he won multiple domestic championships including the state titles of Paraná and Rio Grande do Sul in 2017, the South Brazilian Championship in the same year and the 2019 Sulamericano Kart Codasur in the Cadete class. He lived in Europe from 2019 to 2021 and began competing in WSK sanctioned championships, competing for Praga Kart Racing Team from 2020 to 2021. In 2024, he came third in the newly formed CIK-FIA World Cup in the OK-N class after starting fifteenth on the grid.

=== F4 Brazilian Championship ===
Dall'Agnol made his single-seater debut in the 2025 F4 Brazilian Championship with TMG Racing. He got his first win and podium in the third race of the first round at Interlagos Circuit. In the next round at Autódromo Velo Città, he converted his maiden pole positions in the first and third race, into a second place and a first place. The next two rounds were also held at Autódromo Velo Città, where in the first one he collected two podiums and in the second one he achieved a pole position in the opening race – which was converted into a win – and another win in the final race.

Dall'Agnol skipped the non-championship round which was a supporting race of the 2025 Brazilian Grand Prix. The final two rounds were held at Interlagos Circuit and he collected three podiums in the six remaining races and was crowned champion at the end of the season.

=== Eurocup-3 ===
==== 2025 ====
Dall'Agnol was set to compete in the penultimate round of the 2025 Eurocup-3 season for Palou Motorsport after testing with them throughout the year but withdrew from the round all together.

==== 2026 ====
Dall'Agnol contested the 2026 Eurocup-3 Spanish Winter Championship and the 2026 Eurocup-3 season for Palou Motorsport. In the winter series, he claimed his first point in the opening round at Portimão and achieved his maiden podium in the second race of the second round at Jarama. He ended the championship in fifteenth.

Dall'Agnol had a successful debut round in the main series at Circuit Paul Ricard, coming eighth in the first race and sixth in the sprint race. At the second round, in Algarve International Circuit, he achieved his first series podium in the series in the first race with an third place and improved his best result by one position in the second race, nabbing a second podium in the process. He originally won the first race of the following round at Imola, but dropped back to third due to post-race penalties. He collected two more podiums in the second race of the fifth round at Silverstone, and race two in the sixth round at Jerez – both third places. In the penultimate round at the Hungaroring, he achieved his first legitimate win in the first race, and got on the podium in the second race. He took his second race win in the first race of the final round at Barcelona. Dall'Agnol won the rookies title and came third overall in the championship.

== Personal life ==
Dall'Agnol is a protégé of former Formula One driver Felipe Massa.

== Karting record ==
=== Karting career summary ===
Season	Series	Team	Position
2016	Rio Grande do Sul Cup – Mirim		1st
2016	Rio Grande do Sul State Championship – Mirim		1st
2016	South Brazilian Championship – Mirim		1st
2016	São Paulo Light Kart Cup – Mirim		2nd
2016	Paraná State Championship – Mirim		3rd
2017	Paulista Light Cup – Mirim		1st
2017	São Paulo Light Kart Cup – Mirim		1st
2017	South Brazilian Championship – Mirim		1st
2017	Rio Grande do Sul State Championship – Mirim		1st
2017	Paraná State Championship – Mirim		1st
2017	Brazilian Kart Cup – Mirim		1st
2019	Sulamericano Kart Codasur – Cadete		1st
2019	SKUSA SuperNationals – Micro Swift		20th
2020	WSK Champions Cup – 60 Mini	Praga Kart Racing Team	17th
2020	25° South Garda Winter Cup – Mini ROK	Praga Kart Racing Team	NC
2020	WSK Super Master Series – 60 Mini	Praga Kart Racing Team	81st
2020	Champions of the Future – 60 Mini	Praga Kart Racing Team	19th
2021	WSK Champions Cup – OK Junior	Praga Kart Racing Team	NC
2021	WSK Super Master Series – OK Junior	Praga Kart Racing Team	88th
2021	WSK Euro Series – OK Junior	Praga Kart Racing Team	68th
2021	Champions of the Future – OK Junior	Praga Kart Racing Team	100th
2021	WSK Open Cup – OK Junior	Praga Kart Racing Team	83rd
2021	CIK-FIA European Championship – OK Junior	Praga Kart Racing Team	67th
2021	FIA Karting World Championship – OK Junior	Praga Kart Racing Team	NC
2021	WSK Final Cup – OK Junior	Praga Kart Racing Team	NC
2022	International IAME Games – X30 Junior	Readytorace	11th
2024	SKUSA SuperNationals – KA100 Junior	Velocity Racing	19th
2024	CIK-FIA World Cup – OK-N	Parolin Motorsport	3rd

== Racing record ==
=== Racing career summary ===
Season	Series	Team	Races	Wins	Poles	F/Laps	Podiums	Points	Position
2025	F4 Brazilian Championship	TMG Racing	18	4	3	7	11	243	**1st**
2025	Eurocup-3	Palou Motorsport	0	0	0	0	0	0	NC†
2026	Eurocup-3 Spanish Winter Championship	Palou Motorsport	9	0	0	0	1	11	15th
2026	Eurocup-3	Palou Motorsport	19	2	0	2	8	199	**3rd**

† As Dall'Agnol was a guest driver, he was ineligible for points.
* Season still in progress.

=== Complete F4 Brazilian Championship results ===
(key) (Races in bold indicate pole position; races in italics indicate fastest lap)

Year	Team	1	2	3	4	5	6	7	8	9	10	11	12	13	14	15	16	17	18	DC	Points
2025	TMG Racing	INT1; 1; 4	INT1; 2; 5	INT1; 3; 1	**MGG1**; **1**; 2	MGG1; 2; 2	**MGG1**; **3**; 1	MGG2; 1; 5	MGG2; 2; 3	MGG2; 3; 2	**MGG3**; **1**; 1	MGG3; 2; 7	MGG3; 3; 1	INT3; 1; 2	INT3; 2; 8	INT3; 3; 3	INT4; 1; 3	INT4; 2; 11	INT4; 3; 13	1st	243

=== Complete Eurocup-3 results ===
(key) (Races in bold indicate pole position) (Races in italics indicate fastest lap)

Year	Team	1	2	3	4	5	6	7	8	9	10	11	12	13	14	15	16	17	18	19	DC	Points
2025	Palou Motorsport	RBR; 1	RBR; 2	POR; 1	POR; SR	POR; 2	LEC; 1	LEC; SR	LEC; 2	MNZ; 1	MNZ; 2	ASS; 1	ASS; 2	SPA; 1	SPA; 2	JER; 1 WD	JER; 2 WD	CAT; 1	CAT; 2		NC†	0
2026	Palou Motorsport	LEC; 1; 8	LEC; SR; 6	LEC; 2; 12	POR; 1; 3	POR; 2; 2	IMO; 1; 3	IMO; SR; Ret	IMO; 2; 5	MNZ; 1; 17	MNZ; 2; 16	SIL; 1; 6	SIL; 2; 3	JER; 1; 6	JER; SR; 5	JER; 2; 3	HUN; 1; 1	HUN; 2; 2	CAT; 1; 1	CAT; 2; 5	3rd	199

† As Dall'Agnol was a guest driver, he was ineligible for points.

=== Complete Eurocup-3 Spanish Winter Championship results ===
(key) (Races in bold indicate pole position) (Races in italics indicate fastest lap)

Year	Team	1	2	3	4	5	6	7	8	9	DC	Points
2026	Palou Motorsport	POR; 1; 18	POR; SPR; 24†	POR; 2; 10	JAR; 1; 10	JAR; SPR; 2	JAR; 2; 14	ARA; 1; 15	ARA; SPR; 13	ARA; 2; 16	15th	11
