= Antonella Bassani =

Brazilian racing driver (born 2006)

- Nationality: (Brazil) Brazilian
- Born: 12 April 2006 (age 20) Concórdia, Brazil

Championship titles
- 2023: Porsche Sprint Challenge Brasil

Antonella Farina Bassani (born 12 April 2006) is a Brazilian racing driver competing in Porsche Carrera Cup Brasil.

== Career ==
Bassani began karting at four years old, competing until 2022. At the age of seven, Bassani suffered a serious crash at Tarumã, in which she ruptured her Carina following a rollover, and spent several days under extensive care, in which she suffered 6 heart attacks while under operation. Racing mainly in Brazil, Bassani most notably won the 2015 Brazilian Open and also finished runner-up in the Brazilian Open F4 Graduados standings in 2021. In 2017, Bassani made her only appearance in International karting, racing in the Rotax Max Challenge Grand Finals, in which she finished eighth in the Micro Max class. Near the end of her karting career, Bassani also partook in the first edition of the FIA Girls on Track – Rising Stars program, in which she was one of the four finalists, but lost out to Maya Weug in the shootout.

During 2022, Bassani made her car racing debut at the Interlagos endurance round of the TCR South America Touring Car Championship for Cobra Racing Team alongside her mentor Bia Figueiredo. In her only race of the season, Bassani finished 14th.

The following year, Bassani moved to Porsche Sprint Challenge Brasil as part of the series' Young Racing Academy. In her rookie year, Bassani made history as the first female to qualify on pole and score a podium in Porsche Cup Brasil's history, doing so at Velo Città. Following that, Bassani became the first woman in series history to win a race, doing so at Goiânia, before then taking her second win of the season at Termas de Río Hondo and subsequently becoming the first female to be crowned series champion at the end of the year.

Bassani returned to Porsche Sprint Challenge Brasil for 2024 alongside Letícia Bufoni with the support of C6 Bank. In her second season in the series, Bassani started off the season with a win Goiânia, followed up by further wins at Velo Città and Interlagos to take an early lead in the standings. In the second half of the season, Bassani scored further wins at Estoril and Interlagos as she missed out on the title on dropped scores to Miguel Mariotti.

After spending two years in Porsche Sprint Challenge Brasil, Bassani moved up to Porsche Carrera Cup Brasil for 2025. In her maiden season in the series, Bassani scored a best result of fourth at both Velo Città and Portimão to end her rookie year 13th in points. During 2025, Bassani made her Stock Car Pro Series debut at Velo Città in place of Rubens Barrichello, who was absent as he was supporting his son Eduardo, who was contesting the 6 Hours of Fuji that weekend. As the youngest woman to race in series history, Bassani finished 23rd on debut before bettering that by finishing 18th in race two despite facing engine troubles during the race. Three months later, Bassani made another one-off appearance in the series, racing in the Interlagos finale for Full Time Gazoo Racing.

For 2026, Bassani returned to Porsche Carrera Cup Brasil for her sophomore year in the series.

== Karting record ==
=== Karting career summary ===
| Season | Series | Team | Position |
|---|---|---|---|
| 2012 | Campeonato Sulbrasileiro de Kart – PMK/Mirim | | 10th |
| 2013 | Campeonato Sulbrasileiro de Kart – PMK/Mirim | | 5th |
| 2017 | Rotax Max Challenge Grand Finals – Micro Max | Bassani Antonella | 8th |
| 2019 | Sulamericano Kart Codasur – Junior | | 6th |
| 2020 | Florida Winter Tour – Junior ROK | Goodwood Kartways | 40th |
| 2021 | GP Brasil de F4 – F4 | | NC |
| 2022 | GP Brasil de F4 – F4 Junior | | 4th |

== Racing record ==
=== Racing career summary ===
| Season | Series | Team | Races | Wins | Poles | F/Laps | Podiums | Points | Position |
|---|---|---|---|---|---|---|---|---|---|
| 2022 | TCR South America Touring Car Championship | Cobra Racing Team | 1 | 0 | 0 | 0 | 0 | 3 | 52nd |
| 2023 | Porsche Sprint Challenge Brasil | | 13 | 2 | | | 7 | 222 | **1st** |
| 2024 | Porsche Sprint Challenge Brasil | | 13 | 5 | | | 8 | 248 | **2nd** |
| 2025 | Porsche Carrera Cup Brasil | | 13 | 0 | | | 0 | 107 | 13th |
| 2025 | Stock Car Pro Series | Full Time Cavaleiro | 2 | 0 | 0 | 0 | 0 | 49 | 32nd |
| 2025 | Stock Car Pro Series | Full Time Gazoo Racing | 2 | 0 | 0 | 0 | 0 | 49 | 32nd |
| 2026 | Porsche Carrera Cup Brasil | | 2 | 0 | 0 | 0 | 0 | 16* | 12th* |
| 2026 | Stock Car Pro Series | Full Time Gazoo Racing | | | | | | | |
| 2026 | NASCAR Brasil Series | Full Time Sports | | | | | | | |

=== Complete Stock Car Pro Series results ===
(key) (Races in bold indicate pole position; results in italics indicate fastest lap)

| Year | Team | Car | 1 | 2 | 3 | 4 | 5 | 6 | 7 | 8 | 9 | 10 | 11 | 12 | 13 | 14 | 15 | 16 | 17 | 18 | 19 | 20 | 21 | 22 | 23 | Rank | Points |
|---|---|---|---|---|---|---|---|---|---|---|---|---|---|---|---|---|---|---|---|---|---|---|---|---|---|---|---|
| 2025 | Full Time Cavaleiro | Toyota Corolla Cross | INT; 1 | CAS; 1 | CAS; 2 | VEL; 1 | VEL; 2 | VCA; 1 | VCA; 2 | CRS; 1 | CRS; 2 | CAS; 1 | CAS; 2 | VCA; 1; 23 | VCA; 2; 18 | VCA; 1 | VCA; 2 | MOU; 1 | MOU; 2 | CUI; 1 | CUI; 2 | BRA; 1 | BRA; 2 | | | 32nd | 49 |
| 2025 | Full Time Gazoo Racing | Toyota Corolla Cross | | | | | | | | | | | | | | | | | | | | | | INT; 1; 24 | INT; 2; 18 | 32nd | 49 |
