= 2026 Porsche Cup Brasil =

Motorsport series

The 2026 Porsche Cup Brasil is the 22nd season of Porsche Cup Brasil. The season began at Interlagos Circuit on 28 February and will finish at Interlagos Circuit on 28 November.

The series consisted in three different sprint championships with two subclasses each. The main championship is the Porsche Carrera Cup Brasil (PCCB) which runs Porsche 911 GT3 (992). The secondary championship is the Porsche Sprint Challenge Brasil (PSCB) which ran the Porsche 911 GT3 (991 II). As well there was the entry level championship called Porsche Sprint Trophy Brasil (PSTB) which ran an older version of the Porsche 911 GT3. As well with the Sprint championships there was the Endurance Challenge, with 300 km races while Sprint consisted in 25 minutes +1 lap with a reverse grid decided by an draw based in the results of race 1 for race 2.

Miguel Paludo is the defending champion in Carrera Cup while Marcos Regadas won on Sport Subclass and Silvio Morestoni was the rookie champion, on Sprint Challenge Caio Chaves was the 2025 champion while Lucas Lucatelli was the sport champion and Daniel Neumann got the rookie championship. In Trophy Dennis Ferrer was the previous year champion while Gabriel Guper was the sport champion. In the Endurance sub-championship Marçal Muller and Felipe Fraga were the Endurance Carrera champions, while José Moura Neto and Matheus Iorio were the Endurance Challenge champions.

== Calendar ==
Round	Circuit	Type	Date	PCCB	PSCB	PSTB	Map of circuit locations
1	(São Paulo (state)) Interlagos Circuit, São Paulo, São Paulo	Sprint	28–1 March	Yes	Yes	Yes	2026 Porsche Cup Brasil is located in Atlantic Ocean
2	(São Paulo (state)) Autódromo Velo Città, Mogi Guaçu, São Paulo	Sprint	28–29 March	Yes	Yes	Yes	2026 Porsche Cup Brasil is located in Atlantic Ocean
3	Circuit de la Sarthe, Le Mans , France	Sprint	11–13 June	Yes			2026 Porsche Cup Brasil is located in Atlantic Ocean
4	Algarve International Circuit, Portimão, Portugal	Sprint	4–5 July	Yes	Yes		2026 Porsche Cup Brasil is located in Atlantic Ocean
5	Algarve International Circuit, Portimão, Portugal	Endurance	12 July	Yes	Yes		2026 Porsche Cup Brasil is located in Atlantic Ocean
6	(São Paulo (state)) Interlagos Circuit, São Paulo, São Paulo	Sprint	5–6 September	Yes	Yes	Yes	2026 Porsche Cup Brasil is located in Atlantic Ocean
7	(Federal District (Brazil)) Autódromo Internacional de Brasília, Brasília, Distrito Federal	Endurance	3 October	Yes	Yes		2026 Porsche Cup Brasil is located in Atlantic Ocean
8	(São Paulo (state)) Interlagos Circuit, São Paulo, São Paulo	Sprint	7–8 November	Yes	Yes		2026 Porsche Cup Brasil is located in Atlantic Ocean
9	(São Paulo (state)) Interlagos Circuit, São Paulo, São Paulo	Sprint	21–22 November		Yes	Yes	2026 Porsche Cup Brasil is located in Atlantic Ocean
10	(São Paulo (state)) Interlagos Circuit, São Paulo, São Paulo	Endurance	28 November	Yes	Yes	Yes	2026 Porsche Cup Brasil is located in Atlantic Ocean

== Entry List ==
=== Porsche Carrera Cup Brasil (PCCB) ===
No.	Driver	Class	Rounds	Endurance entries	Rounds
7	(Brazil) Miguel Paludo		1–5	(Brazil) Alan Hellmeister	5
8	(Brazil) Alceu Feldmann Neto		1–2, 5	(Brazil) Gabriel Casagrande	5
10	(Brazil) Thiago Vivacqua		1–4		
17	(Brazil) Marcos Regadas		1–5	(Brazil) Felipe Drugovich	5
21	(Brazil) Miguel Marioti		1–5	(Brazil) Rafael Martins	5
57	(Brazil) Werner Neugebauer		5	(Brazil) Lucas di Grassi	5
70	(Brazil) Lucas Salles		1–5	(Brazil) Rafael Suzuki	5
72	(Brazil) Antonella Bassani		1–4		
88	(Brazil) Pedro Boesel		3		
97	(Brazil) Jeff Giassi		1–4		
117	(Brazil) Pietro Fantin		1–4		
118	(Brazil) Matheus Comparatto		1–5	(Brazil) Felipe Baptista	5
554	(Brazil) Marçal Müller		1–5	(Brazil) Gaetano di Mauro	5
1	(Brazil) Alceu Feldmann	S	1–2		
2	(Brazil) Silvio Morestoni	S	1–2, 4–5	(Brazil) Matheus Machado	5
3	(Brazil) Cristian Mohr	S	1–4		
14	(Brazil) Carlos Campos	S	1–5	(Brazil) Thiago Vivacqua	5
22	(Brazil) Raijan Mascarello	S	1–2, 4		
23	(Brazil) Leonardo Herrmann	S	1–5	(Brazil) César Ramos	5
27	(Brazil) Josimar Junior	S	1–5	(Brazil) Sergio Ramalho	5
29	(Brazil) Rodrigo Mello	S	1–5	(Brazil) Pedro Boesel	5
31	(Brazil) Sebá Malucelli	S	1–5	(Brazil) Marcos Gomes	5
51	(Brazil) Israel Salmen	S	1–5	(Brazil) Gustavo Zanon	5
56	(Brazil) Peter Feter	S	3–4		
67	(Brazil) Gustavo Zanon	S	1–2		
77	(Brazil) Francisco Horta	S	1–3		
80	(Brazil) Rouman Ziemkiewicz	S	1–5	(Brazil) Nelson Piquet Jr.	5
888	(Brazil) Lineu Pires	S	1–5	(Brazil) Norberto Gresse	5
9	(Brazil) Edu Guedes	R	1–4		
12	(Brazil) Marco Pisani	R	1-5	(Brazil) Renan Guerra	5
15	(Brazil) Leonardo Sanchez	R	1–5	(Brazil) Diego Nunes	5
19	(Brazil) Pipo Massa	R	1–5	(Brazil) Felipe Massa	5
25	(Brazil) Paulo Souza	R	1–5	(Luxembourg) Dylan Pereira	5
33	(Brazil) Bruno Campos	R	1–5	(Brazil) Nicolas Costa	5
37	(Brazil) Rafa Brocchi	R	1		
38	(Brazil) Eric Santos	R	5	(Brazil) Gabriel Robe	5
39	(Brazil) Luiz Souza	R	1–5	(Brazil) Bruno Bonifacio	5
44	(Brazil) André Gaidzinsky	R	1–5		
45	(Brazil) José Moura Neto	R	1–5	(Brazil) Matheus Iorio	5
71	(South Korea) SangHo Kim	R	1–4		
83	(Brazil) Marco Billi	R	1–4		
93	(Republic of Ireland) Michael Fassbender	R	3		
99	(Brazil) Wagne Pontes	R	1–5	(Brazil) Antonella Bassani	5

Icon	Class
S	Sport
R	Rookie

=== Porsche Sprint Challenge Brasil (PSCB) ===
No.	Driver	Class	Rounds	Endurance entries	
21	(Brazil) Daniel Neumann		1–4		
22	(Brazil) Caio Castro		1–5	(Brazil) Danilo Dirani	1–5
66	(Brazil) Sadak Leite		1–5	(Brazil) Fábio Carbone	5
82	(Brazil) Gerson Campos		1–4		
134	(Brazil) Will Cesar		1–4		
3	(Brazil) Gabriel Guper	S	1–4		
10	(Brazil) Nicholas Garfinkel	S	1–5	(Brazil) Victor Tieri	5
15	(Brazil) Marco Mascari	S	1–4		
78	(Brazil) Enrico Pedrosa	S	2-5	(Brazil) Luiz Landi	5
87	(Brazil) Pedro Mac Dowel	S	1		
98	(Brazil) Cecília Rabelo	S	1–4		
4	(Brazil) Charles Gruenberg	R	1–4		
7	(Brazil) Adriano Valverde	R	1–4		
11	(Brazil) Emilio Moreira	R	1–2		
12	(Brazil) Raulo Reales	R	5	(Brazil) Yuri Alves	5
16	(Brazil) Gabriel Cestari	R	2-4		
18	(Brazil) Ricardo Zylberman	R	1–4		
21	(Brazil) Denis Ferrer	R	4		
23	(Brazil) Lucas Castellani	R	1–5	(Brazil) Raphael Abbate	5
58	(Brazil) Claudio Simão	R	1–2		
91	(Brazil) Dilson Peres Jr	R	1–5	(Brazil) Dilson Peres Jr	5
100	(Brazil) Raphael Bernardes	R	1–5	(Brazil) Giuliano Raucci	5
222	(Brazil) Eldo Umbelino	R	1–5	(Brazil) Marcelo Henriques	5
311	(Brazil) Victor Mahle	R	1–5	(Brazil) Witold Ramasauskas	5
331	(Brazil) Neto Heil	R	1–4		
777	(Brazil) Marcelo Bentivoglio	R	1–4		

=== Porsche Sprint Trophy Brasil (PSTB) ===
No.	Driver	Class	Rounds
5	(Brazil) Guilherme Figueiredo		1–2
72	(Brazil) Sergio Laurentys		1–2
78	(Brazil) Neylson Almeida		1–2
121	(Brazil) Denis Ferrer		1–2
0	(Brazil) Vinicius Motta	S	1–2
1	(Brazil) Gustavo Costa	S	1–2
10	(Brazil) Alexandre Assolini	S	1–2
11	(Brazil) Paulo Reales	S	1–2
12	(Brazil) Davi Cordeiro	S	2
18	(Brazil) Alexande Azevedo	S	1–2
22	(Brazil) Heverton Cardoso	S	1–2
27	(Brazil) Nilson Jocionis	S	1–2
29	(Brazil) Manu Herrmann	S	1–2
30	(Brazil) Marcelo Kairis	S	1–2
34	(Brazil) Leonardo Marcelli	S	2
35	(Brazil) Cuca Petrelli	S	1–2
51	(Brazil) Rodrigo Arruy	S	1–2
77	(Brazil) João Guerra	S	1–2
88	(Brazil) Alex Fonseca	S	1–2
157	(Brazil) Cylmar Fortes	S	1
911	(Brazil) Paulo Muzy	S	1–2

== Race Results ==
Round		Circuit	Carrera winner	Challenge winner	Trophy Winner
1	R1	(São Paulo (state)) Interlagos Circuit	(Brazil) Marçal Müller	(Brazil) Gerson Campos	(Brazil) Sergio Laurentys
1	R2	(São Paulo (state)) Interlagos Circuit	(Brazil) Jeff Giassi	(Brazil) Daniel Neumann	
2	R1	(São Paulo (state)) Autódromo Velo Città	(Brazil) Marçal Müller	(Brazil) Enrico Pedrosa	(Brazil) Denis Ferrer
2	R2	(São Paulo (state)) Autódromo Velo Città	(Brazil) Thiago Vivacqua	(Brazil) Enrico Pedrosa	
3	R1	(France) Circuit de la Sarthe	(Brazil) Jeff Giassi		
3	R2	(France) Circuit de la Sarthe	(Brazil) Pietro Fantin		
4	R1	(Portugal) Algarve International Circuit	(Brazil) Marçal Müller	(Brazil) Gerson Campos	
4	R2	(Portugal) Algarve International Circuit	(Brazil) Lucas Salles	(Brazil) Gerson Campos	
5	ER	(Portugal) Algarve International Circuit	(Brazil) Marçal Müller (Brazil) Gaetano di Mauro	(Brazil) Sadak Leite (Brazil) Fábio Carbone	
6	R1	(São Paulo (state)) Interlagos Circuit			
6	R2	(São Paulo (state)) Interlagos Circuit			
7	ER	(Federal District (Brazil)) Autódromo Internacional de Brasília			
8	R1	(São Paulo (state)) Interlagos Circuit			
8	R2	(São Paulo (state)) Interlagos Circuit			
9	R1	(São Paulo (state)) Interlagos Circuit			
9	R2	(São Paulo (state)) Interlagos Circuit			
10	ER	(São Paulo (state)) Interlagos Circuit			

== Championship Standings ==
SPRINT SCORING SYSTEM:

Feature Race:

Position	1st	2nd	3rd	4th	5th	6th	7th	8th	9th	10th	11th	12th	13th	14th	15th	16th	17th	18th	19th	20th
Points	28	25	23	21	19	17	16	15	14	13	12	11	10	9	8	7	6	5	4	3

Reverse grid:

Position	1st	2nd	3rd	4th	5th	6th	7th	8th	9th	10th	11th	12th	13th	14th	15th	16th	17th	18th	19th	20th
Points	25	22	20	18	16	14	13	12	11	10	9	8	7	6	5	4	3	2	1	0

PCCB SPRINT:

Pos	Driver	(São Paulo (state)) INT1		(São Paulo (state)) VEL		(France) LMA		(Portugal) ALG		(São Paulo (state)) INT2		(São Paulo (state)) INT3	Points	Sport	Rookie
1	(Brazil) Marçal Müller	1	4	1	4	2	Ret	1	6	1	1		159		
2	(Brazil) Lucas Salles	2	7	2	6	9	18	6	1	9	9		135		
3	(Brazil) Antonella Bassani	17	10	4	5	6	2	5	2	Ret	Ret		133		
4	(Brazil) Jeff Giassi	5	1	7	3	1	5	DSQ	14	Ret	36		130		
5	(Brazil) Miguel Paludo	8	6	5	2	4	3	Ret	7	10	4		124		
6	(Brazil) Marcos Regadas	9	8	9	7	7	DSQ	3	5	9	35		108		
7	(Brazil) Matheus Comparatto	4	3	8	9	8	21	4	Ret	Ret	30		103		
8	(Brazil) Thiago Vivacqua	3	5	6	1	23	6	Ret	15	DSQ	6		100		
9	(Brazil) Pietro Fantin	30	32	10	8	3	1	DSQ	10	Ret	2		83		
10	(Brazil) Sebá Malucelli	6	9	17	20	14	20	7	3				79	87	
11	(Brazil) Miguel Marioti	10	11	23	21	Ret	11	2	4	18	24		72		
12	(Brazil) Israel Salmen	16	15	11	12	11	DSQ	19	11	Ret	7		57	67	
13	(Brazil) Lineu Pires	12	16	12	23	10	7	Ret	19	13	12		54	65	
14	(Brazil) Pipo Massa	20	14	20	24	5	4	29	18	12	8		52		106
15	(Brazil) Carlos Campos	14	33	Ret	16	22	9	11	8	Ret	DSQ		48	47	
16	(Brazil) Rodrigo Mello	18	35	16	11	20	DSQ	10	12	27	23		45	47	
17	(Brazil) Alceu Feldmann	7	2	Ret	15					5	34		43	33	
18	(Brazil) Francisco Horta	11	12	Ret	18	15	8			24	14		42	49	
19	(Brazil) Leonardo Herrmann	15	21	13	22	DSQ	16	9	Ret	14	11		36	38	
20	(Brazil) José Moura Neto	22	23	Ret	17	12	10	12	Ret				35		80
21	(Brazil) Josimar Junior	WD	WD	17	13	Ret	15	8	Ret				32	41	
22	(Brazil) Raijan Mascarello	21	13	15	10			16	20				32	38	
23	(Brazil) Bruno Campos	23	18	22	14	18	17	14	Ret				25		83
24	(Brazil) Alceu Feldmann Neto	WD	WD	3	Ret					2	5		23		
25	(Brazil) Rouman Ziemkiewicz	19	26	Ret	Ret	21	DSQ	13	13	3	13		21	20	
26	(Brazil) Pedro Boesel					13	11						19		
27	(Brazil) Leonardo Sanchez	Ret	34	21	Ret	19	12	18	27				17		13
28	(Brazil) Cristian Mohr	13	31	DSQ	31	16	Ret	23	30	4	3		17	19	
29	(Brazil) Marco Billi	28	Ret	19	Ret	26	19	15	16				13		53
30	(Brazil) Peter Feter					EX	EX	22	9	6			11		13
31	(Brazil) Silvio Morestoni	DSQ	19	Ret	Ret			20	17				11	12	
32	(Brazil) Gustavo Zanon	29	19	14	Ret								10	13	
33	(Republic of Ireland) Michael Fassbender					25	14						6		14
34	(Brazil) Marco Pisani	34	22	WD	WD	17	Ret	27	29				6		31
	(Brazil) Edu Guedes	33	Ret	25	26	30	23	21	24	15	16		0		31
	(Brazil) Wagner Pontes	27	25	24	30	27	24	24	21	22	20		0		41
	(Brazil) Luiz Souza	Ret	28	27	25	24	Ret	DSQ	22	29	25		0		32
	(South Korea) SangHo Kim	31	29	29	28	28	22	26	26				0		26
	(Brazil) Rafa Brocchi	26	24										0		17
	(Brazil) André Gaidzinsky	32	30	26	27	29	Ret	25	25	24	29		0		24
	(Brazil) Paulo Souza	25	27	28	29	Ret	Ret	Ret	28	17	19		0		9

PSCB SPRINT:

Pos	Driver	(São Paulo (state)) INT1		(São Paulo (state)) VEL		(Portugal) ALG		(São Paulo (state)) INT2	(São Paulo (state)) INT3	(São Paulo (state)) INT4	Points	Sport	Rookie
1	(Brazil) Gerson Campos	1	2	2	6	1	1				145		
2	(Brazil) Daniel Neumann	2	1	3	Ret	3	7				107		
3	(Brazil) Will Cesar	5	5	5	3	5	10				104		
4	(Brazil) Enrico Pedrosa			1	1	2	2				100	33	
5	(Brazil) Cecília Rabelo	6	4	7	2	19	6				93	68	
6	(Brazil) Nicholas Garfinkel	17	8	20	4	6	3				76	51	
7	(Brazil) Caio Castro	3	Ret	4	11	9	15				73		
8	(Brazil) Sadak Leite	4	3	19	Ret	4	5				70		
9	(Brazil) Gabriel Guper	13	6	15	DSQ	7	4				66	44	
10	(Brazil) Marco Mascari	7	15	8	5	10	Ret				65	45	
11	(Brazil) Neto Heil	8	10	6	Ret	8	17				63	51	
12	(Brazil) Claudio Simão	10	12	9	9						46	23	54
13	(Brazil) Dilson Peres Jr	20	Ret	12	12	13	8				45	20	49
14	(Brazil) Charles Gruenberg	12	11	16	Ret	15	11				45	17	48
15	(Brazil) Gabriel Cestari			10	7	14	12				44	21	49
16	(Brazil) Eldo Umbelino	15	13	Ret	8	17	14				40	11	37
17	(Brazil) Raphael Bernardes	11	9	18	Ret	11	18				40	22	52
18	(Brazil) Lucas Castellani	14	10	11	Ret	18	DSQ				36	15	41
19	(Brazil) Marcelo Bentivoglio	18	16	WD	WD	16	9				28	9	28
20	(Brazil) Adriano Valverde	21	14	13	Ret	12	Ret				27	11	31
21	(Brazil) Ricardo Zylberman	16	17	14	Ret	20	16				27	3	23
22	(Brazil) Emilio Moreira	19	18	17	10						22	2	19
23	(Brazil) Pedro Mac Dowel	9	19								15	11	
24	(Brazil) Denis Ferrer					Ret	13				8	2	6

PSTB SPRINT:

Pos	Driver	(São Paulo (state)) INT1	(São Paulo (state)) VEL	(São Paulo (state)) INT2	(São Paulo (state)) INT3	(São Paulo (state)) INT4	Points	Sport
1	(Brazil) Sergio Laurentys	1	3				51	
2	(Brazil) Neylson Almeida	2	2				50	
3	(Brazil) Marcelo Kairis	3	4				44	36
4	(Brazil) Gustavo Costa	4	10				38	21
5	(Brazil) Paulo Muzy	5	5				38	28
6	(Brazil) Rodrigo Arruy	6	8				32	20
7	(Brazil) Nilson Jocionis	8	7				31	18
8	(Brazil) Denis Ferrer	DSQ	1				28	
9	(Brazil) Alexandre Assolini	12	9				26	10
10	(Brazil) Paulo Reales	7	18				26	9
11	(Brazil) Cuca Petrelli	9	16				21	7
12	(Brazil) Heverton Cardoso	10	13				21	7
13	(Brazil) Vinicius Motta	13	12				21	5
14	(Brazil) Manu Herrmann	11	17				18	4
15	(Brazil) Leonardo Marcelli		6				17	13
16	(Brazil) Alex Fonseca	17	14				17	4
17	(Brazil) Alexandre Azevedo	16	15				17	3
18	(Brazil) Guilherme Figueiredo	Ret	11				12	
19	(Brazil) João Guerra	15	20				11	0
20	(Brazil) Cylmar Fortes	14					7	0
21	(Brazil) Davi Cordeiro		19				4	0

ENDURANCE SCORING SYSTEM:

Estoril and Goiania points:

Position	1st	2nd	3rd	4th	5th	6th	7th	8th	9th	10th	11th	12th	13th	14th	15th	16th	17th	18th	19th	20th
Points at one hour	26	23	21	19	17	15	14	13	12	11	10	9	8	7	6	5	4	3	2	1
Points at the finish	52	46	42	38	34	30	28	26	24	22	20	18	16	14	12	10	8	6	4	2

Interlagos points:

Position	1st	2nd	3rd	4th	5th	6th	7th	8th	9th	10th	11th	12th	13th	14th	15th	16th	17th	18th	19th	20th
Points at one hour	32	28	26	24	22	20	18	16	14	12	10	9	8	7	6	5	4	3	2	1
Points at the finish	64	56	52	48	44	40	36	32	28	24	20	18	16	14	12	10	8	6	4	2

ENDURANCE:

Pos	Driver	(Portugal) ALG	(Federal District (Brazil)) BRS	(São Paulo (state)) INT	Points	Sport	Rookie
Cup
1	(Brazil) Marçal Müller (Brazil) Gaetano di Mauro	1^{1}			78		
2	(Brazil) Matheus Comparatto (Brazil) Felipe Baptista	2^{2}				62	
3	(Brazil) Carlos Campos (Brazil) Thiago Vivacqua	3^{10}			52		
4	(Brazil) Sebá Malucelli (Brazil) Marcos Gomes	4^{14}			45		
5	(Brazil) Paulo Sousa (Luxembourg) Dylan Pereira	5					
6	(Brazil) Lineu Pirei (Brazil) Norberto Gresse	6					
7	(Brazil) Marco Pisani (Brazil) Renan Guerra	7					
8	(Brazil) Rodrigo Mello (Brazil) Pedro Boesel	8					
9	(Brazil) Miguel Mariotti (Brazil) Rafael Martins	9					
10	(Brazil) Leonardo Herrmann (Brazil) Cesar Ramos	10					
11	(Brazil) Miguel Paludo (Brazil) Alan Hellmeister	11					
12	(Brazil) Alceu Feldmann Neto (Brazil) Gabriel Casagrande	12					
13	(Brazil) Bruno Campos (Brazil) Nicolas Costa	13					
14	(Brazil) Jose Moura Neto (Brazil) Matheus Iorio	14					
15	(Brazil) Wagner Pontes (Brazil) Antonella Bassani	15					
16	(Brazil) Werner Neugebauer (Brazil) Lucas di Grassi	16					
17	(Brazil) Eric Santos (Brazil) Gabriel Robe	17					
19	(Brazil) Israel Salmen (Brazil) Gustavo Zanon	20					
20	(Brazil) Luiz Souza (Brazil) Bruno Bonifacio	21					
21	(Brazil) Josimar Junior (Brazil) Sergio Ramalho	26					
22	(Brazil) Lucas Salles (Brazil) Rafael Suzuki	27					
23	(Brazil) Pipo Massa (Brazil) Felipe Massa	30^{5}			17		
24	(Brazil) Marcos Regadas (Brazil) Felipe Drugovich	33					
25	(Brazil) Rouman Ziemkiwicz (Brazil) Nelsinho Piquet	35					
26	(Brazil) Leonardo Sanchez (Brazil) Diego Nunes	Ret					
CHALLENGE
1	(Brazil) Sadak Leite (Brazil) Fabio Carbone	19					
2	(Brazil) Victor Mahle (Brazil) Witold Ramasauska	22					
3	(Brazil) Raphael Bernardes (Brazil) Giuliano Raucci	23					
4	(Brazil) Lucas Castellani (Brazil) Raphael Abbate	24					
5	(Brazil) Eldo Umbelino (Brazil) Marcelo Henriques	25					
6	(Brazil) Paulo Reales (Brazil) Yuri Alves	28					
7	(Brazil) Enrico Pedrosa (Brazil) Luiz Landi	29					
8	(Brazil) Nicholas Garfinkel (Brazil) Victor Tieri	31					
9	(Brazil) Caio Castro (Brazil) Danilo Dirani	32					
10	(Brazil) Dilson Peres Jr. (Brazil) Marco Cozzi	34					
