= 2025 Porsche Cup Brasil =

Motorsport series

The 2025 Porsche Cup Brasil was the 21st season of Porsche Cup Brasil. The season began at Autódromo Velo Città on 22 March and finished at Interlagos Circuit on 22 November.

The series consisted in three different sprint championships with two subclasses each. The main championship is the Porsche Carrera Cup Brasil (PCCB) which runs Porsche 911 GT3 (992). The secondary championship is the Porsche Sprint Challenge Brasil (PSCB) which ran the Porsche 911 GT3 (991). As well there was the entry level championship called Porsche Sprint Trophy Brasil (PSTB) which ran an older version of the Porsche 911 GT3. As well with the Sprint championships there was the Endurance Challenge, with 300 Km races while Sprint consisted in 25 minutes +1 lap.

Marçal Muller was the defending champion in Carrera Cup while Peter Feder won on Sport subclass and Israel Salmen was the rookie champion, on Sprint Challenge Miguel Marioti was the 2024 champion while Célio Brasil was the sport champion and Caio Chaves got the rookie championship. In Trophy José Moura neto was the previous year champion while Neto Heil was the sport champion.

== Calendar ==
Round	Circuit	Type	Date	PCCB	PSCB	PSTB	Map of circuit locations
1	(São Paulo (state)) Autódromo Velo Città, Mogi Guaçu, São Paulo	Sprint	22–23 March	Yes	Yes	Yes	2025 Porsche Cup Brasil is located in Atlantic Ocean
2	(São Paulo (state)) Autódromo Velo Città, Mogi Guaçu, São Paulo	Sprint	5–6 April	Yes	Yes	Yes	2025 Porsche Cup Brasil is located in Atlantic Ocean
3	(São Paulo (state)) Interlagos Circuit, São Paulo, São Paulo	Sprint	26–27 April	Yes	Yes	Yes	2025 Porsche Cup Brasil is located in Atlantic Ocean
4	Algarve International Circuit, Portimão, Portugal	Sprint	28–29 June	Yes	Yes		2025 Porsche Cup Brasil is located in Atlantic Ocean
5	Algarve International Circuit, Portimão, Portugal	Endurance	6 July	Yes	Yes		2025 Porsche Cup Brasil is located in Atlantic Ocean
5.1	(São Paulo (state)) Interlagos Circuit, São Paulo, São Paulo		2–3 August			Yes	2025 Porsche Cup Brasil is located in Atlantic Ocean
6	Circuito do Estoril, Estoril, Portugal	Sprint	28–29 August	Yes	Yes		2025 Porsche Cup Brasil is located in Atlantic Ocean
7	Circuito do Estoril, Estoril, Portugal	Endurance	31 August	Yes	Yes		2025 Porsche Cup Brasil is located in Atlantic Ocean
8	(São Paulo (state)) Interlagos Circuit, São Paulo, São Paulo	Sprint	8–9 November	Yes	Yes		2025 Porsche Cup Brasil is located in Atlantic Ocean
9	(São Paulo (state)) Interlagos Circuit, São Paulo, São Paulo	Endurance	22 November	Yes	Yes	Yes	2025 Porsche Cup Brasil is located in Atlantic Ocean

== Entry list ==
=== Porsche Carrera Cup Brasil (PCCB) ===
No.	Driver	Class	Rounds
TBA	(Brazil) Antonella Bassani		TBC
TBA	(Brazil) Bruno Campos		TBC
TBA	(Brazil) Carlos Campos		TBC
TBA	(Brazil) Chico Horta		TBC
TBA	(Brazil) Cristian Mohr		TBC
TBA	(Brazil) Edu Guedes		TBC
TBA	(Brazil) Gustavo Zanon		TBC
129	(Brazil) Fernando Arruda		TBC
TBA	(Brazil) Israel Salmen		TBC
TBA	(Brazil) Josimar Junior		TBC
TBA	(Brazil) Lineu Pires		TBC

Icon	Class
S	Sport
R	Rookie

=== Porsche Sprint Challenge Brasil (PSCB) ===
No.	Driver	Class	Rounds
TBA	(Brazil) Caio Chaves		TBC
TBA	(Brazil) Cecília Rabelo		TBC
TBA	(Brazil) Claudio Reina		TBC
TBA	(Brazil) Cláudio Simão		TBC
TBA	(Brazil) Daniel Neumann		TBC
TBA	(Brazil) Fernando Arruda		TBC
TBA	(Brazil) Gerson Campos		TBC
TBA	(Brazil) Heverton Cardoso		TBC
TBA	(Brazil) José Moura Neto		TBC
TBA	(Brazil) Leonardo Herrmann		TBC
TBA	(Brazil) Lucas Locatelli		TBC
TBA	(Brazil) Luiz Souza		TBC
TBA	(Brazil) Mario de Lara		TBC
TBA	(Brazil) Matheus Roque		TBC
TBA	(Brazil) Rafa Brocchi		TBC
TBA	(Brazil) Raphael Bernardes		TBC
TBA	(Brazil) Ricardo Zylberman		TBC
TBA	(Brazil) William Araújo		TBC

=== Porsche Sprint Trophy Brasil (PSTB) ===
No.	Driver	Class	Rounds
TBA	(Brazil) Fabrício Simões		TBC
TBA	(Brazil) Gabriel Guper		TBC
TBA	(Brazil) Guilherme Figueredo		TBC
TBA	(Brazil) Luis Eduardo		TBC
TBA	(Brazil) Neto Carloni		TBC
