= 2025 F4 Brazilian Championship =

Brazilian motorsports competition

The 2025 F4 Brazilian Championship was the fourth season of the F4 Brazilian Championship. It was a multi-event motor racing championship for open wheel, formula racing cars regulated according to FIA Formula 4 regulations.

== Teams and drivers ==
All pre-selected teams were Brazilian-registered.

Starrett replaced Oakberry as the titular sponsor of the Bassani Racing team.

Team	No.	Driver	Class	Rounds
TMG Racing	00	(Brazil) Celo Hahn	R	All, NC
TMG Racing	3	(Brazil) Naim Saleh	R	NC
TMG Racing	23	(Argentina) Federico Díaz	R	NC
TMG Racing	27	(Brazil) Heitor Dall'Agnol	R	All
TMG Racing	41	(Brazil) Ricardo Baptista	R	All, NC
TMG Racing	55	(Brazil) Murilo Rocha	R	5–6
TMG Racing	59	(Brazil) Pietro Mesquita	R	All, NC
TMG Racing	71	(Brazil) Ciro Sobral		1–4
TMG Racing	99	(Paraguay) Sasha Beisemann	R	1
TMG Racing	135	(Brazil) Filippo Fiorentino		2–6, NC
Cavaleiro Sports	7	(Brazil) Rogério Grotta		All
Cavaleiro Sports	12	(Brazil) Ethan Nobels		1–4, NC
Cavaleiro Sports	15	(Brazil) Alexandre Louza	R	5–6
Cavaleiro Sports	18	(Brazil) Rafaela Ferreira		6, NC
Cavaleiro Sports	21	(Brazil) Elias Barbosa	R	NC
Cavaleiro Sports	23	(Argentina) Federico Díaz	R	5
Cavaleiro Sports	29	(Brazil) Enricco Abreu	R	All, NC
Cavaleiro Sports	45	(Brazil) João Paulo Sanzovo	R	NC
Cavaleiro Sports	88	(Brazil) Bernardo Gentil	R	1–2
Cavaleiro Sports	95	(Brazil) Alceu Feldmann Neto		All
Starrett Bassani	26	(Brazil) Pedro Lins	R	All, NC
Starrett Bassani	31	(Argentina) Renzo Barbuy	R	All, NC
Starrett Bassani	33	(Brazil) Christian Helou	R	All, NC
Starrett Bassani	55	(Brazil) Murilo Rocha	R	1–4
Starrett Bassani	71	(Brazil) Ciro Sobral		5, NC
Starrett Bassani	188	(Brazil) Pedro Lima	R	All, NC

Icon	Class
R	Rookie

== Race calendar ==
The schedule with the planned circuits was revealed on 16 January 2025. All rounds were held in Brazil. All but one non-championship round ran alongside the 2025 São Paulo Grand Prix and supported the 2025 Stock Car Pro Series events. On 13 June, the first Velo Città round was postponed to the end of September. On 27 November, the round at Autódromo Internacional de Brasília was cancelled and replaced with another round at the Interlagos Circuit.

Round		Circuit	Date	Pole position	Fastest lap	Winning driver	Winning team	Rookie winner
1	R1	Interlagos Circuit, São Paulo	3 May	(Brazil) Ciro Sobral	(Brazil) Heitor Dall'Agnol	(Brazil) Ciro Sobral	TMG Racing	(Brazil) Celo Hahn
1	R2	Interlagos Circuit, São Paulo	3 May		(Brazil) Pietro Mesquita	(Brazil) Murilo Rocha	Starrett Bassani	(Brazil) Murilo Rocha
1	R3	Interlagos Circuit, São Paulo	4 May	(Brazil) Ciro Sobral	(Brazil) Ethan Nobels	(Brazil) Heitor Dall'Agnol (Note: Nobels finished first on the track but, following the appeal in court, was given twenty-second penalty for causing a collision. Dall'Agnol inherited the win.)	TMG Racing	(Brazil) Heitor Dall'Agnol
2	R1	Autódromo Velo Città, Mogi Guaçu	19 July	(Brazil) Heitor Dall'Agnol	(Brazil) Heitor Dall'Agnol	(Brazil) Filippo Fiorentino	TMG Racing	(Brazil) Heitor Dall'Agnol
2	R2	Autódromo Velo Città, Mogi Guaçu	19 July		(Brazil) Heitor Dall'Agnol	(Brazil) Pedro Lins	Starrett Bassani	(Brazil) Pedro Lins
2	R3	Autódromo Velo Città, Mogi Guaçu	20 July	(Brazil) Heitor Dall'Agnol	(Brazil) Heitor Dall'Agnol	(Brazil) Heitor Dall'Agnol	TMG Racing	(Brazil) Heitor Dall'Agnol
3	R1	Autódromo Velo Città, Mogi Guaçu	27 September	(Brazil) Pedro Lima	(Brazil) Heitor Dall'Agnol	(Brazil) Filippo Fiorentino	TMG Racing	(Brazil) Murilo Rocha
3	R2	Autódromo Velo Città, Mogi Guaçu	27 September		(Brazil) Rogério Grotta	(Brazil) Rogério Grotta	Cavaleiro Sports	(Brazil) Heitor Dall'Agnol
3	R3	Autódromo Velo Città, Mogi Guaçu	28 September	(Brazil) Pedro Lima	(Brazil) Pedro Lima	(Brazil) Pedro Lima	Starrett Bassani	(Brazil) Pedro Lima
4	R1	Autódromo Velo Città, Mogi Guaçu	4 October	(Brazil) Heitor Dall'Agnol	(Brazil) Heitor Dall'Agnol	(Brazil) Heitor Dall'Agnol	TMG Racing	(Brazil) Heitor Dall'Agnol
4	R2	Autódromo Velo Città, Mogi Guaçu	4 October		(Brazil) Murilo Rocha	(Brazil) Ricardo Baptista	TMG Racing	(Brazil) Ricardo Baptista
4	R3	Autódromo Velo Città, Mogi Guaçu	5 October	(Brazil) Filippo Fiorentino	(Brazil) Heitor Dall'Agnol	(Brazil) Heitor Dall'Agnol	TMG Racing	(Brazil) Heitor Dall'Agnol
NC	R1	Interlagos Circuit, São Paulo	8 November	(Brazil) Filippo Fiorentino	(Brazil) Filippo Fiorentino	(Brazil) Filippo Fiorentino	TMG Racing	(Brazil) Pietro Mesquita
NC	R2	Interlagos Circuit, São Paulo	8 November		(Brazil) Filippo Fiorentino	(Brazil) Rafaela Ferreira	Cavaleiro Sports	(Brazil) Pedro Lima
NC	R3	Interlagos Circuit, São Paulo	9 November	(Brazil) Filippo Fiorentino	(Brazil) Rafaela Ferreira	(Brazil) Filippo Fiorentino	TMG Racing	(Brazil) Pedro Lima
5	R1	Interlagos Circuit, São Paulo	10 December	(Brazil) Murilo Rocha	(Brazil) Murilo Rocha	(Brazil) Murilo Rocha	TMG Racing	(Brazil) Murilo Rocha
5	R2	Interlagos Circuit, São Paulo	11 December		(Brazil) Pedro Lima	(Brazil) Pedro Lima	Starrett Bassani	(Brazil) Pedro Lima
5	R3	Interlagos Circuit, São Paulo	11 December	(Brazil) Murilo Rocha	(Brazil) Murilo Rocha	(Brazil) Murilo Rocha	TMG Racing	(Brazil) Murilo Rocha
6	R1	Interlagos Circuit, São Paulo	13 December	(Brazil) Alceu Feldmann Neto	(Brazil) Filippo Fiorentino	(Brazil) Alceu Feldmann Neto	Cavaleiro Sports	(Brazil) Murilo Rocha
6	R2	Interlagos Circuit, São Paulo	14 December		(Brazil) Alceu Feldmann Neto	(Brazil) Pedro Lins	Starrett Bassani	(Brazil) Pedro Lins
6	R3	Interlagos Circuit, São Paulo	14 December	(Brazil) Alceu Feldmann Neto	(Brazil) Murilo Rocha	(Brazil) Alceu Feldmann Neto	Cavaleiro Sports	(Brazil) Murilo Rocha

== Championship standings ==
Points are awarded to the top ten classified finishers in 30-minute races and for the top eight classified finishers in 20-minute races. The final individual classifications will be obtained by dropping two worst scores from the first fifteen held races.

Races	Position, points per race										
Races	**1st**	**2nd**	**3rd**	**4th**	**5th**	**6th**	**7th**	**8th**	**9th**	**10th**	**FL**
Qualifying	2										
30-minute races	25	18	15	12	10	8	6	4	2	1	1
20-minute races	15	12	10	8	6	4	2	1			1

=== Drivers' standings ===
Pos	Driver	INT1			MGG1			MGG2			MGG3			INT2			INT3			INT4			Pts
1	(Brazil) Heitor Dall'Agnol	4	5	1	**2**	2	**1**	5	3	2	**1**	7	1				2	8	3	3	11	13	243
2	(Brazil) Murilo Rocha	8	1	4	5	3	6	4	10	3	5	2	8				**1**	7	**1**	2	Ret	2	204
3	(Brazil) Pedro Lima	9	13†	6	3	7	2	**3**	11	**1**	4	3	3	14	3	2	3	1	5	4	13	3	193
4	(Brazil) Filippo Fiorentino				1	5	3	1	8	4	2	6	**4**	**1**	2	**1**	5	2	12	5	5	Ret	159
5	(Brazil) Alceu Feldmann Neto	5	3	7	Ret	DNS	DNS	2	Ret	8	12	9	6				4	5	2	**1**	3	**1**	155
6	(Brazil) Pedro Lins	6	6	9	7	1	5	14†	12	6	3	Ret	2	4	6	5	15	Ret	7	8	1	5	121
7	(Brazil) Ethan Nobels	2	4	13	6	4	8	Ret	6	5	6	5	5	2	Ret	DNS							85
8	(Brazil) Pietro Mesquita	7	2	3	Ret	6	4	6	7	13†	WD	DSQ	11	3	4	3	Ret	6	4	15†	12	9	78
9	(Brazil) Rogério Grotta	Ret	8	2	4	10	11	9	1	10	9	DSQ	14				8	3	9	10	4	Ret	77
10	(Brazil) Ricardo Baptista	14†	7	5	9	14	10	11	Ret	9	8	1	13	6	9	6	7	Ret	6	6	6	4	74
11	(Brazil) Ciro Sobral	**1**	14†	**8**	Ret	8	7	7	2	14†	10	DNS	9	8	10†	12	11	Ret	Ret				59
12	(Brazil) Celo Hahn	3	Ret	Ret	Ret	9	15†	10	4	Ret	Ret	8	12	Ret	7	7	6	4	11	7	2	11	59
13	(Brazil) Enricco Abreu	10	11	Ret	12	11	14	13	9	7	7	4	7	10	5	9	10	9	Ret	13	7	6	38
14	(Argentina) Renzo Barbuy	WD	WD	WD	10	13	13	8	Ret	11	11	Ret	Ret	7	DSQ	8	13	11	10	9	Ret	7	14
15	(Brazil) Christian Helou	12	9	10	11	12	12	12	5	12	DSQ	Ret	10	11	DNS	10	9	10	14	12	10	12	10
16	(Brazil) Bernardo Gentil	11	10	11	8	Ret	9																6
17	(Brazil) Rafaela Ferreira													5	1	4				14	9	8	4
18	(Argentina) Federico Díaz													9	11†	13	14	12	8				4
19	(Brazil) Alexandre Louza																12	13	13	11	8	10	2
20	(Paraguay) Sasha Beisemann	13	12	12																			0
non championship round entries ineligible for points
–	(Brazil) Elias Barbosa													Ret	8	11							–
–	(Brazil) Naim Saleh													12	12†	DNS							–
–	(Brazil) João Paulo Sanzovo													13	Ret	DNS							–

Colour	Result
Gold	Winner
Silver	Second place
Bronze	Third place
Green	Points classification
Blue	Non-points classification
Blue	Non-classified finish (NC)
Purple	Retired, not classified (Ret)
Red	Did not qualify (DNQ)
Red	Did not pre-qualify (DNPQ)
Black	Disqualified (DSQ)
White	Did not start (DNS)
White	Withdrew (WD)
White	Race cancelled (C)
Blank	Did not practice (DNP)
Blank	Did not arrive (DNA)
Blank	Excluded (EX)

**Bold** – Pole
Italics – Fastest Lap
† — Did not finish but classified

=== Rookies' championship ===
Pos	Driver	INT1			MGG1			MGG2			MGG3			INT2			INT3			INT4			Pts
1	(Brazil) Heitor Dall'Agnol	2	3	1	**1**	2	**1**	**3**	1	2	**1**	5	**1**				2	5	2	2	7	11	281
2	(Brazil) Murilo Rocha	5	1	3	3	3	5	2	6	3	4	2	5				**1**	4	**1**	**1**	Ret	**1**	251
3	(Brazil) Pedro Lima	6	10†	5	2	5	2	**1**	7	**1**	3	3	3	10	1	**1**	3	1	4	3	9	2	229
4	(Brazil) Pedro Lins	3	4	6	4	1	4	10†	8	4	2	Ret	2	2	4	3	11	Ret	6	6	1	4	163
5	(Brazil) Ricardo Baptista	11†	5	4	6	10	7	7	Ret	6	6	1	9	**3**	7	4	5	Ret	5	4	3	3	128
6	(Brazil) Pietro Mesquita	4	2	2	Ret	4	3	4	4	9†	WD	DSQ	7	1	2	2	Ret	3	3	11	8	7	127
7	(Brazil) Celo Hahn	**1**	Ret	**Ret**	Ret	6	11†	6	2	Ret	Ret	6	8	Ret	5	5	4	2	9	5	2	9	108
8	(Brazil) Enricco Abreu	7	8	Ret	9	7	10	9	5	5	5	4	4	6	3	7	7	6	Ret	10	4	5	89
9	(Brazil) Christian Helou	9	6	7	8	8	8	8	3	8	DSQ	Ret	6	7	DNS	8	6	7	11	9	6	10	64
10	(Argentina) Renzo Barbuy	WD	WD	WD	7	9	9	5	Ret	7	7	Ret	Ret	4	DSQ	6	9	8	8	7	Ret	6	51
11	(Brazil) Bernardo Gentil	8	7	8	5	Ret	6																28
12	(Brazil) Alexandre Louza																8	10	10	8	5	8	19
13	(Argentina) Federico Díaz													5	8†	10	10	9	7				7
14	(Paraguay) Sasha Beisemann	10	9	9																			3
non championship round entries ineligible for points
–	(Brazil) Elias Barbosa													DNS	6	9							–
–	(Brazil) Naim Saleh													8	9†	DNS							–
–	(Brazil) João Paulo Sanzovo													9	Ret	DNS							–

=== Teams' championship ===
Each team acquired the points earned by their two best drivers in each race.

Pos	Team	INT1			MGG1			MGG2			MGG3			INT2			INT3			INT4			Pts
1	TMG Racing	**1**	2	1	1	2	**1**	1	2	2	**1**	1	1	**1**	2	**1**	**1**	2	**1**	2	2	2	585
1	TMG Racing	3	5	3	**2**	5	3	5	3	4	2	6	**4**	3	4	3	2	4	3	3	5	4	585
2	Starrett Bassani	6	1	4	3	1	2	**3**	5	**1**	3	2	2	4	3	2	3	1	5	4	1	3	393
2	Starrett Bassani	8	6	6	5	3	5	4	10	3	4	3	3	7	6	5	9	10	7	8	10	5	393
3	Cavaleiro Sports	2	3	2	4	4	8	2	1	5	6	4	5	2	1	4	4	3	2	**1**	3	**1**	340
3	Cavaleiro Sports	5	4	7	6	10	9	9	6	7	7	5	6	5	5	9	8	5	8	10	4	6	340
