= Alceu Feldmann Neto =

Brazilian racing driver (born 2008)

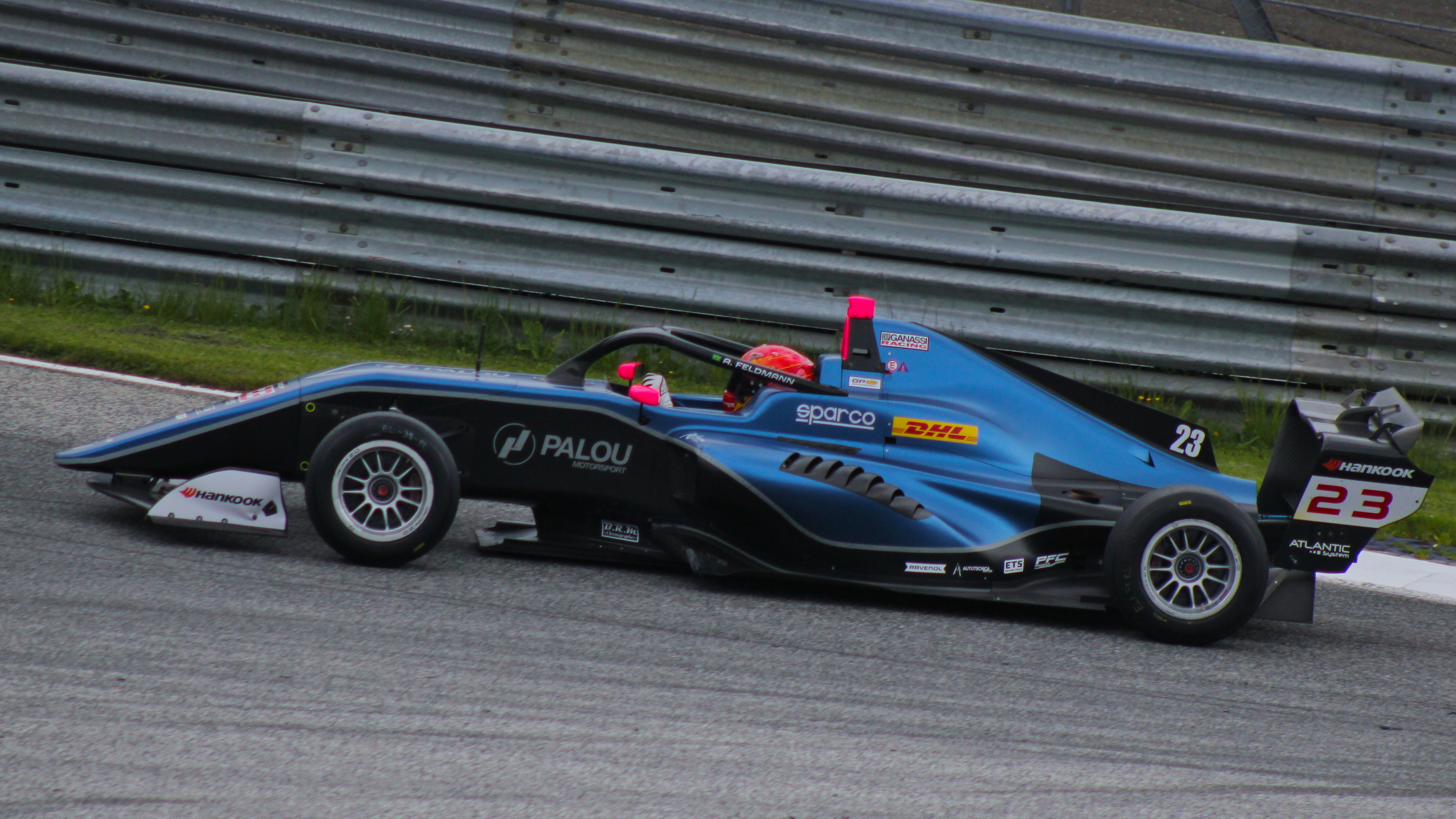
- Feldmann in 2025
- Nationality: (Brazil) Brazilian
- Born: 2 May 2008 (age 18) São Paulo, Brazil
- Relatives: Alceu Feldmann (father)

Eurocup-3 career
- Debut season: 2025
- Car number: 8
- Former teams: Sparco Palou MS, MP Motorsport
- Starts: 36
- Wins: 0
- Podiums: 0
- Poles: 0
- Fastest laps: 0
- Best finish: 28th in 2026

Previous series
- 2026 2026 2025–2026 2025 2024–2025 2024: Euroformula Open; FR Middle East; Eurocup-3 Spanish Winter; NASCAR Brasil Series; F4 Brazilian; Porsche Sprint Challenge Sport Brasil

Championship titles
- 2024: Porsche Endurance Challenge Sport Brasil

Alceu Feldmann Neto (born 2 May 2008) is a Brazilian racing driver who last competed in Eurocup-3 with MP Motorsport.

== Personal life ==
Feldmann Neto is the son of Alceu Feldmann, who is also a racing driver. Feldmann Neto is also the grandson of Alceu Elias Feldmann, an entrepreneur with an estimated net worth of US$3.7B as of 2026, who founded fertilizer company Fertipar in 1980.

== Career ==
=== Porsche Cup Brasil and NASCAR Brasil one-off (2024–present) ===
Feldmann Neto made his car racing debut in 2024, competing in the Porsche Sprint and Endurance Challenge Sport Brasil series. Between the two series, Feldmann Neto found more success in the latter, taking two wins and sealing the Endurance Challenge title alongside Gabriel Casagrande.

Across the following two seasons, Feldmann Neto made sporadic returns to the Porsche Cup Brasil series alongside his single-seater commitments, as well as making a one-off appearance in the 2025 NASCAR Brasil Series for Full Time Sports.

=== Formula 4 (2024–2025) ===
During 2024, Feldmann Neto made his single-seater debut in the F4 Brazilian Championship for Bassani Racing at Goiânia. Switching to Cavaleiro Sports for the remainder of the season, Feldmann Neto took a best result of sixth in race two in Buenos Aires to end the year 14th overall.

Continuing with Cavaleiro for his second season in the series the following year, Feldmann Neto began the year by taking his maiden series podiums at the first Interlagos round and the second Mogi Guaçu round. Following a podium in the penultimate Interlagos round, Feldmann Neto won twice in the season finale from pole en route to a fifth-place points finish.

=== Formula Regional (2025–2026) ===
In 2025, Feldmann Neto made his debut in Formula Regional machinery, competing for Palou Motorsport in a dual campaign in the Eurocup-3 Spanish Winter and main championships. In both series, Feldmann Neto failed to score points, only scoring a best result of 15th in race one at Barcelona in the main series.

The following year, Feldmann Neto switched to MP Motorsport for a dual campaign in the Formula Regional Middle East Trophy and the Eurocup-3 Spanish Winter Championship. After scoring a best result of ninth at Algarve in the latter, Feldmann Neto continued with the team to race in the main Eurocup-3 season, in which he finished no higher than 13th to take 28th in overall points. During 2026, Feldmann Neto also joined BVM Racing to race on a part-time basis in Euroformula Open.

== Racing record ==
=== Racing career summary ===
Season	Series	Team	Races	Wins	Poles	F/Laps	Podiums	Points	Position
2024	Porsche Sprint Challenge Sport Brasil		12	0	0	0	0	29	15th
2024	Porsche Endurance Challenge Sport Brasil		3	2	0	0	2	116	**1st**
2024	F4 Brazilian Championship	Oakberry Bassani F4	3	0	0	0	0	13	14th
2024	F4 Brazilian Championship	Cavaleiro Sports	9	0	0	0	0	13	14th
2025	Eurocup-3 Spanish Winter Championship	Sparco Palou MS	8	0	0	0	0	0	30th
2025	Eurocup-3	Sparco Palou MS	18	0	0	0	0	0	32nd
2025	F4 Brazilian Championship	Cavaleiro Sports	16	2	2	1	6	155	5th
2025	Porsche Carrera Cup Brasil		12	0	0	0	0	125	9th
2025	Porsche Endurance Challenge Brasil		3	0	0	0	0	111	12th
2025	NASCAR Brasil Series – Challenge	Full Time Sports	3	0	0	0	0	5	23rd
2026	Formula Regional Middle East Trophy	MP Motorsport	11	0	0	0	0	0	34th
2026	Eurocup-3 Spanish Winter Championship	MP Motorsport	9	0	0	0	0	3	19th
2026	Eurocup-3	MP Motorsport	18	0	0	0	0	0	28th
2026	Porsche Carrera Cup Brasil		2	0	0	0	1	23*	15th*
2026	Porsche Endurance Challenge Brasil		1	0	0	0	0	*	12th*
2026	Euroformula Open Championship	BVM Racing	6	0	0	0	0	9	18th

* Season still in progress.

=== Complete F4 Brazilian Championship results ===
(key) (Races in bold indicate pole position; races in italics indicate fastest lap)

Year	Team	1	2	3	4	5	6	7	8	9	10	11	12	13	14	15	16	17	18	19	20	21	22	23	24	25	DC	Points
2024	Oakberry Bassani F4	MGG1; 1	MGG1; 2	MGG1; 3	INT1; 1	INT1; 2	INT1; 3	MGG2; 1	MGG2; 2	MGG2; 3	GOI1; 1; 9	GOI1; 2; 10	GOI1; 3; 13														14th	13
2024	Cavaleiro Sports													BUA; 1; 8	BUA; 2; 6	BUA; 3; 10	INT2; 1	INT2; 2	INT2; 3	GOI2; 1; 12	GOI2; 2; 13	GOI2; 3; 9	INT3; 1	INT3; 2; 12	INT3; 3; 15	INT3; 4 Ret	14th	13
2025	Cavaleiro Sports	INT1; 1; 5	INT1; 2; 3	INT1; 3; 7	MGG1; 1 Ret	MGG1; 2 DNS	MGG1; 3 DNS	MGG2; 1; 2	MGG2; 2 Ret	MGG2; 3; 8	MGG3; 1; 12	MGG3; 2; 9	MGG3; 3; 6	INT2; 1	INT2; 2	INT2; 3	INT3; 1; 4	INT3; 2; 5	INT3; 3; 2	**INT4**; **1**; 1	INT4; 2; 3	**INT4**; **3**; 1					5th	155

=== Complete Eurocup-3 Spanish Winter Championship results ===
(key) (Races in bold indicate pole position) (Races in italics indicate fastest lap)

Year	Team	1	2	3	4	5	6	7	8	9	DC	Points
2025	Sparco Palou MS	JER; 1; 22	JER; 2; 23	JER; 3; 20	POR; 1; 20	POR; 2; 23	POR; 3; 25	ARA; 1; 22	ARA; 2; 23		30th	0
2026	MP Motorsport	POR; 1; 9	POR; SR; 10	POR; 2; 11	JAR; 1; 16	JAR; SR; 11	JAR; 2; 12	ARA; 1; 23	ARA; SR; 23	ARA; 2; 15	19th	3

=== Complete Eurocup-3 results ===
(key) (Races in bold indicate pole position; races in italics indicate fastest lap)

Year	Team	1	2	3	4	5	6	7	8	9	10	11	12	13	14	15	16	17	18	19	DC	Points
2025	Sparco Palou MS	RBR; 1; 26	RBR; 2; 26	POR; 1; 16	POR; SR; 18	POR; 2; 26	LEC; 1 Ret	LEC; SR; 24	LEC; 2; 19	MNZ; 1 Ret	MNZ; 2; 24	ASS; 1; 27	ASS; 2; 24	SPA; 1; 26	SPA; 2; 19	JER; 1; 23	JER; 2; 20	CAT; 1; 15	CAT; 2 Ret		32nd	0
2026	MP Motorsport	LEC; 1; 24	LEC; SR; Ret	LEC; 2; 25	POR; 1; 13	POR; 2; 22	IMO; 1; 18	IMO; SR; Ret	IMO; 2 DNS	MNZ; 1; 13	MNZ; 2 Ret	SIL; 1; 24	SIL; 2; 26	JER; 1; 19	JER; SR; 20	JER; 2; 15	HUN; 1; 29†	HUN; 2; 19	CAT; 1; 25	CAT; 2; 19	28th	0

=== Complete Formula Regional Middle East Trophy results ===
(key) (Races in bold indicate pole position) (Races in italics indicate fastest lap)

Year	Entrant	1	2	3	4	5	6	7	8	9	10	11	12	DC	Points
2026	MP Motorsport	YMC1; 1; 32	YMC1; 2; 25	YMC1; 3; 16	YMC2; 1 Ret	YMC2; 2 Ret	YMC2; 3; 29	DUB; 1; 25	DUB; 2; 23	DUB; 3 Ret	LUS; 1; 29	LUS; 2 C	LUS; 3 Ret	34th	0

=== Complete Euroformula Open Championship results ===
(key) (Races in bold indicate pole position) (Races in italics indicate fastest lap)

Year	Entrant	1	2	3	4	5	6	7	8	9	10	11	12	13	14	15	16	17	18	19	20	21	22	23	24	DC	Points
2026	BVM Racing	ALG; 1	ALG; 2	ALG; 3	SPA; 1; 11	SPA; 2 Ret	SPA; 3 Ret	MIS; 1	MIS; 2	MIS; 3	HUN; 1	HUN; 2	HUN; 3	LEC; 1 Ret	LEC; 2; 10	LEC; 3; 6	HOC; 1	HOC; 2	HOC; 3	MNZ; 1	MNZ; 2	MNZ; 3	CAT; 1	CAT; 2	CAT; 3	18th	9
