= NASCAR Awards Banquet =

Annual auto racing awards ceremony

The NASCAR Awards Banquet is an annual awards ceremony and banquet held after the conclusion of each NASCAR season. Starting in 2025, the event will be held in Scottsdale, Arizona at a yet-to-be-announced venue. It previously was held at the Charlotte Convention Center in Charlotte, North Carolina in 2024, the Music City Center in Nashville, Tennessee in 2019 and from 2021 to 2023. Prior to that it was held in Las Vegas at the Wynn, in New York City at the Waldorf Astoria and in Daytona Beach, Florida at the Plaza Hotel.

The event was previously only for the NASCAR Cup Series, with NASCAR's other series having separate awards banquets. However, champions from NASCAR's other series were recognized at the Cup Series awards banquet starting in 2021 instead of having a separate awards banquet.

== History ==
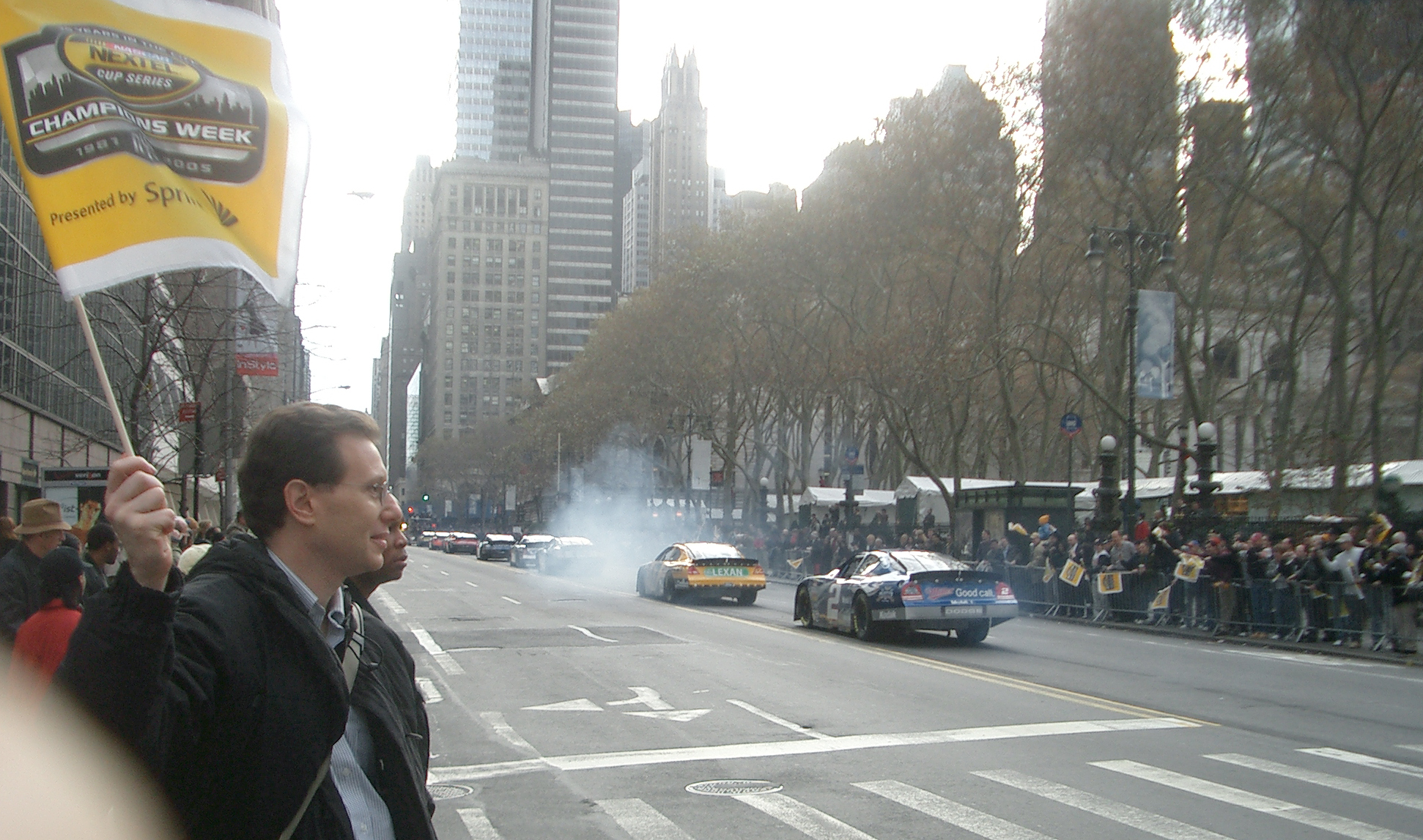
Cup Series cars, including Matt Kenseth's No. 17 and Rusty Wallace's No. 2, driving through Manhattan past Bryant Park during Champion's Week in 2005

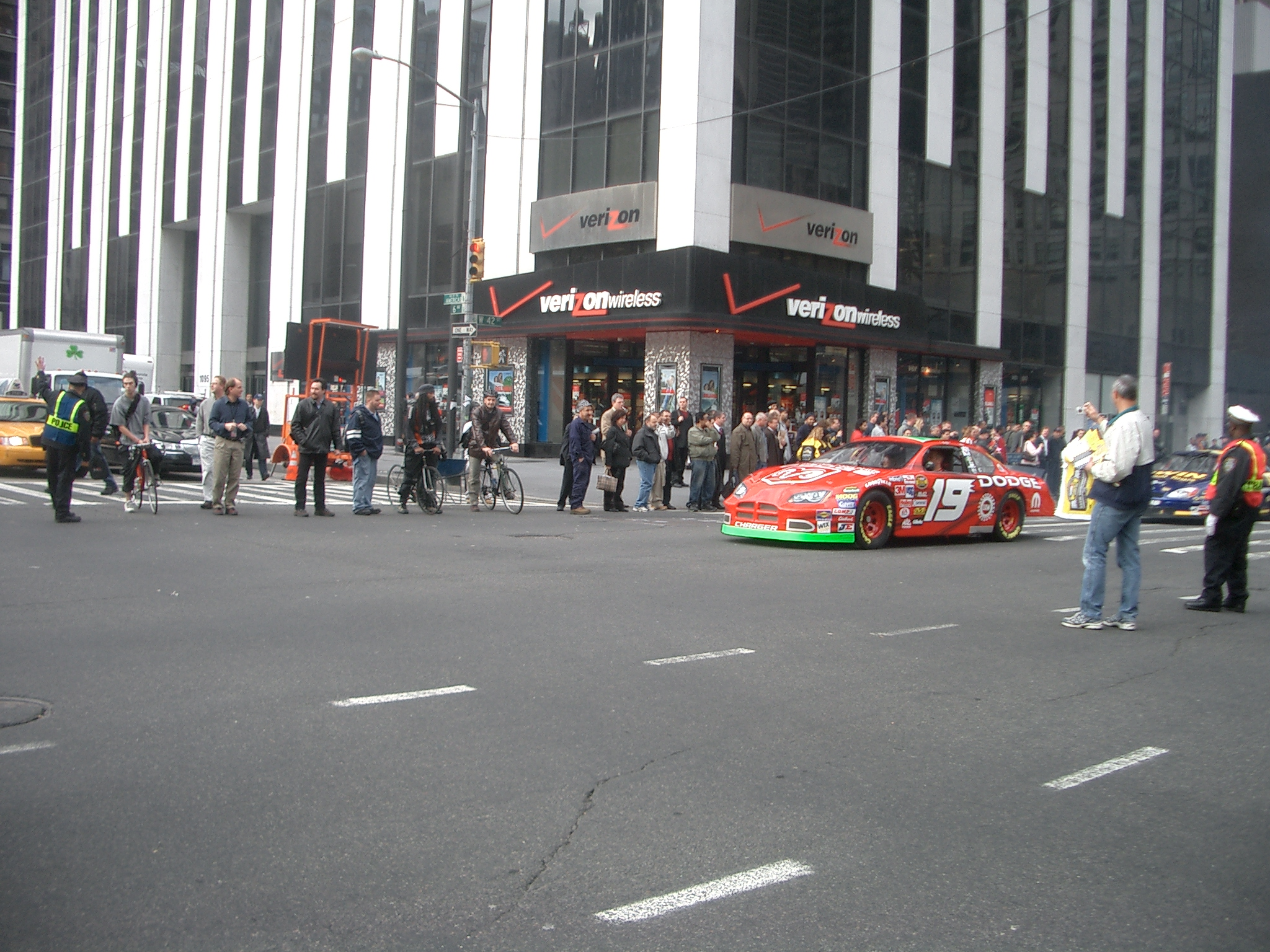
Jeremy Mayfield driving past the Barclay–Vesey Building, the Verizon headquarters, in 2005 during Champion's Week

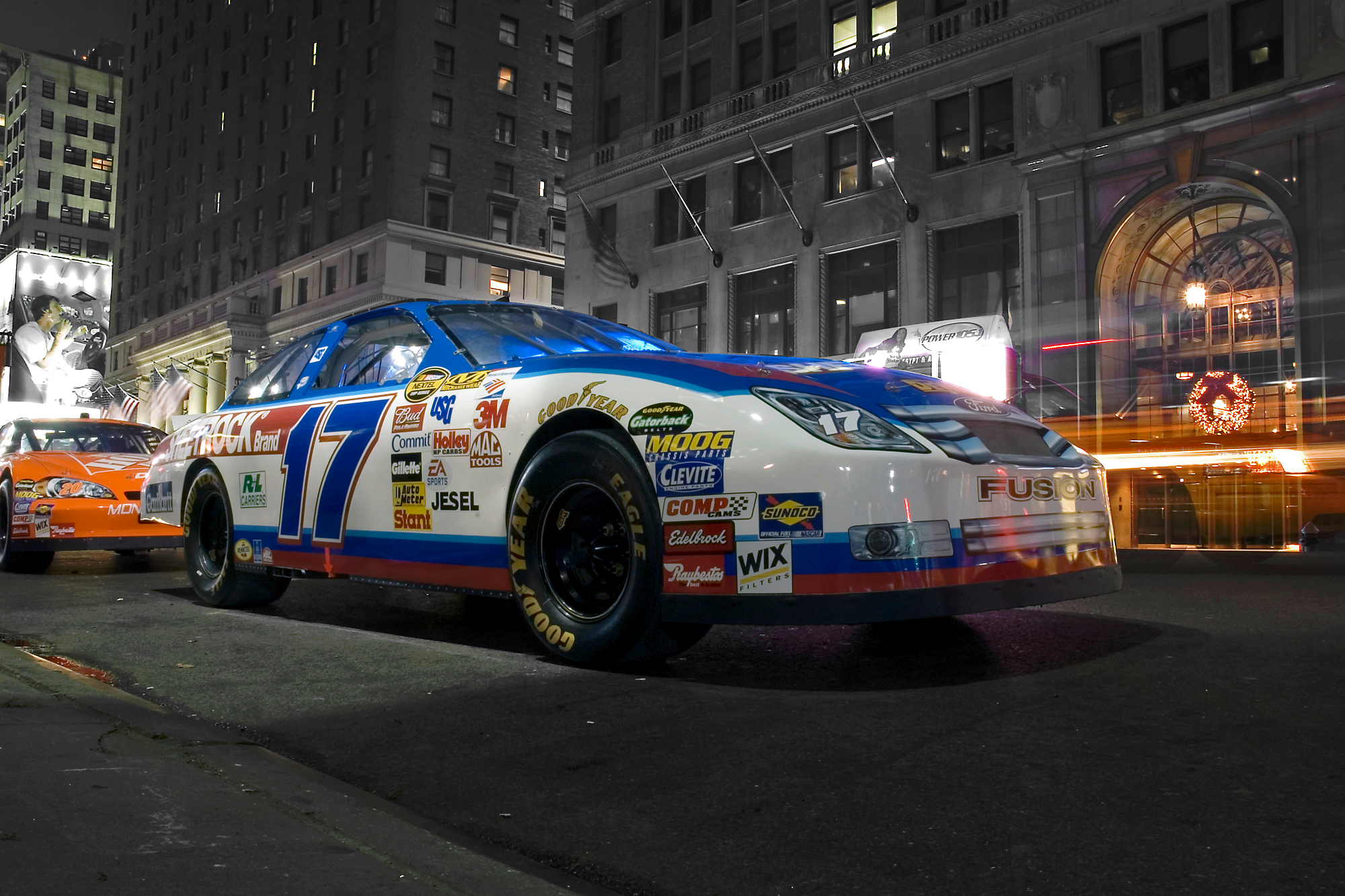
Tony Stewart's No. 20 and Matt Kenseth's No. 17 driving through Manhattan during Champion's Week in 2006

The awards banquet had initially been held in Daytona Beach, Florida at the Plaza Hotel in the hotel's basement and had only been a private event for Cup Series drivers and teams that finished in the top 10 in the final standings along with NASCAR executives with no media members allowed to attend. NASCAR President Bill France Jr. had the idea of making the event bigger as the sport was growing across the United States. In 1981, it was moved to New York City at the Waldorf Astoria, and the ceremony was held in the Starlight Roof and the event was opened up to the media for the first time. After 1983, the event outgrew the Starlight Roof, and it was held in the Waldorf Astoria's Grand Ballroom starting in 1984 and would remain there each year through 2008. When the awards banquet was moved to New York City, additional events around the city held in the days before it was added to the festivities, such as the cars taking a drive down Broadway and doing burnouts in Times Square. The championship-winning driver (starting with Darrell Waltrip in 1981) would also appear on daytime television shows filmed in New York City during Champion's Week, giving NASCAR even more exposure to Americans.

In 2009, the awards banquet moved from New York City to Las Vegas to seek a change of pace from the busy holiday shopping season in the city, which arguably became a distraction from the outdoor events such as the ones in Times Square as well as to get away from the cold weather in that part of the country in December. Las Vegas had a more relaxing and slower-paced environment and warmer weather for that time of year for Champion's Week. Additionally, New York City hotel room prices for attendees were very high, particularly that year during the Great Recession, and prices were cheaper in Las Vegas, which also had more space for fans to attend the other events of Champion's Week. The awards banquet would be held at the Wynn Las Vegas for the next ten years. The Burnouts on the Boulevard event featured the playoff drivers driving their cars down Las Vegas Boulevard and doing burnouts on the street on one day of Champion's Week.

Actor and comedian Jay Mohr was the celebrity host of the ceremony several times in the 2010s. His 2013 monologue controversially included numerous digs and jokes at Danica Patrick, who had just finished her first full-time season in the Cup Series. She was visibly unhappy during his remarks, and when taking the stage to receive an award later in the evening, Patrick used her speaking time to criticize Mohr, saying, "I have amazing fans, I'm so fortunate, and I think it's pretty safe to say Jay Mohr is not one of them." Despite this, he was invited back in 2014 to host again. The Price Is Right host Drew Carey hosted the 2015 ceremony. Mohr returned to host in 2016, the most recent year he has been the host. In a number of the following years, NASCAR has had its NBC commentators, which broadcast the event on TV, handle the main hosting responsibilities instead of a celebrity, primarily Rutledge Wood, who notably would wear plaid suits to the ceremony.

In 2015, actor Tom Cruise was a surprise celebrity guest at the banquet to give a speech for the retiring Jeff Gordon, and musician Eddie Vedder was a surprise celebrity guest at the 2016 banquet to give a speech for the retiring Tony Stewart. The NASCAR industry surprised Stewart and Vedder with a $1.8 million donation to Vedder's EB Research Partnership.

In 2017, NASCAR moved the prizegiving banquet from Friday to Thursday, primarily to allow competitors who wanted to participate in the Snowball Derby to arrive for Friday practice sessions.

In 2019, NASCAR moved the awards banquet from Las Vegas to Nashville, and this marked the return of NASCAR to the city (excluding the ARCA Menards Series race at the Nashville Fairgrounds Speedway) for the first time since the closure of the Nashville Superspeedway in 2012. The return of NASCAR to the growing Nashville market would ultimately lead to Nashville Superspeedway being reopened and getting a Cup Series date (Dover Motorsports, the owner of the track, moved one of the two Cup Series races at their Dover track to Nashville) in 2021 as well as the track getting Xfinity and Truck Series race dates back again. In addition, country music singer Cassadee Pope was the event's celebrity host in 2019. The cars would drive through and do burnouts on Nashville's Broadway during a day of champion's week the same way they had done it on the Las Vegas Boulevard and in Times Square.

In 2020, the ceremony and Champion's Week were canceled due to the COVID-19 pandemic. NASCAR on NBC would instead air a primetime special with their pit reporters Marty Snider and Kelli Stavast interviewing Cup Series champion Chase Elliott, Xfinity Series champion Austin Cindric and Truck Series champion Sheldon Creed in their studio.

Burnouts on Broadway was not held during Champion's Week in 2022, to the dismay of many fans. NASCAR did not state why it was not done that year.

On August 30, 2024, NASCAR announced that the Awards Banquet would be moved from Nashville to Charlotte for 2024. The Cup, Xfinity and Truck Series banquet was held on Friday, November 22 and the banquet for NASCAR's regional series would be held the day prior on Thursday, November 21. The banquet itself would be held in the Charlotte Convention Center across the street from the NASCAR Hall of Fame in the Grand Ballroom. Media interviews on the red carpet and an autograph session for fans was held before the ceremony inside the Hall of Fame.

On September 15, 2025, NASCAR announced that the banquet would move from Charlotte to Scottsdale, Arizona in 2025 and would be held on Tuesday, November 4, two days after the NASCAR Cup Series Championship Race at the nearby Phoenix Raceway. They did not announce the exact venue of the ceremony in that announcement. The Cup, Xfinity and Truck Series would be part of this banquet while NASCAR would have a separate banquet for their regional series in Charlotte later in the month. The event would be held days after the championship.

=== Xfinity and Truck Series awards ceremonies ===
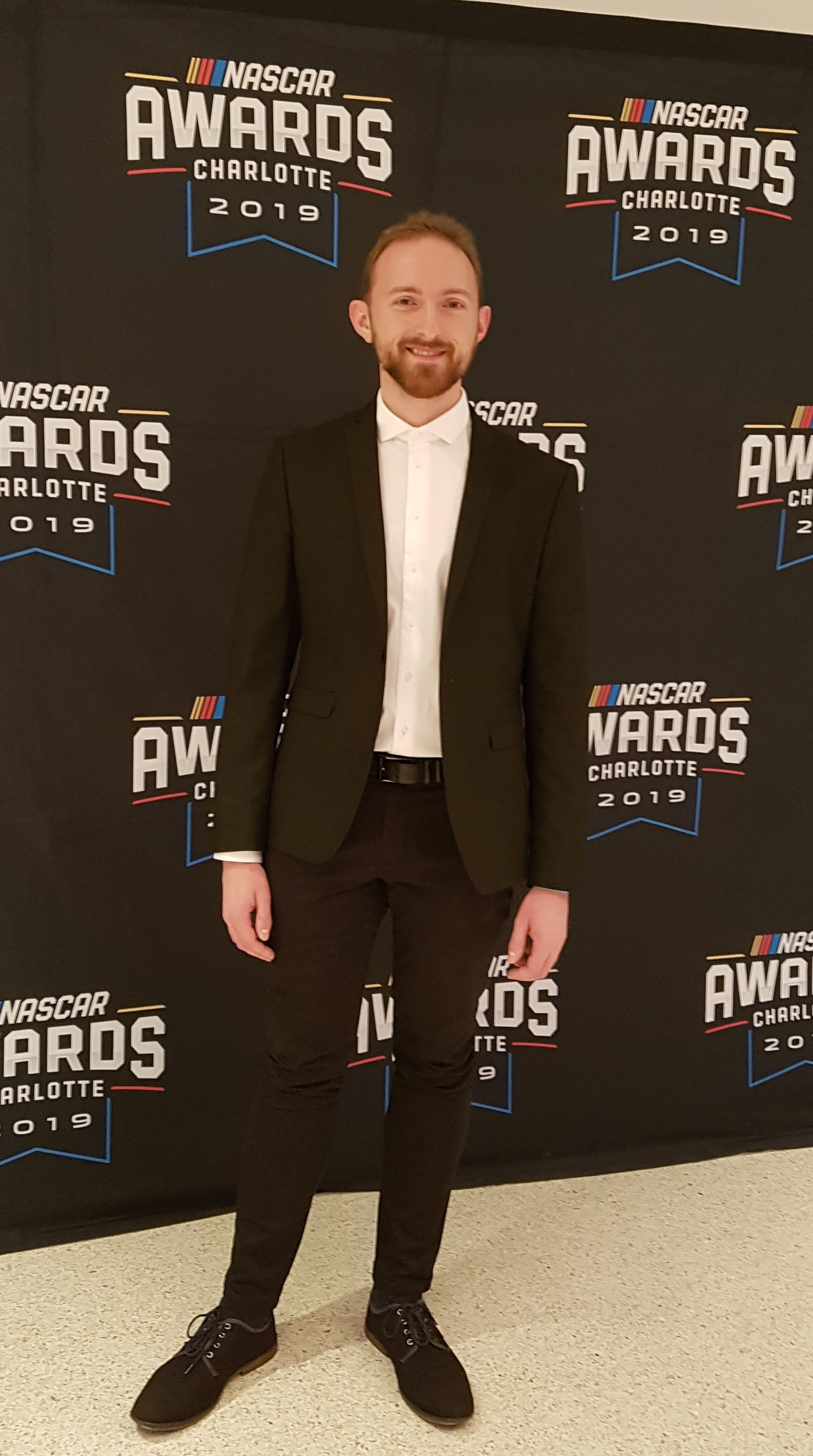
Alain Mosqueron at the 2019 awards ceremony in Charlotte for all NASCAR series except the Cup Series

NASCAR held a separate awards banquet for the Xfinity and Truck Series, its other two national series, for several years in Miami, the same city as the season-ending races at Homestead-Miami Speedway. The banquet for the two series had been held in various hotels across Miami over the years, including one year at the Trump National Doral in 2014. When Donald Trump became a candidate for president in the 2016 United States presidential election (which he would end up winning), Truck Series title sponsor Camping World CEO Marcus Lemonis announced that he and his company would not support the awards banquet if it was held there again and urged NASCAR to move it to another venue in light of Trump's numerous controversial statements about immigrants on the campaign trail. NASCAR would move the Xfinity and Truck Series banquet back to the Loews Miami Beach Hotel, the previous location of the banquet before it was held at the Trump National Doral.

Starting in 2017, this banquet would be canceled and combined into the awards banquet for NASCAR's regional series in Charlotte, North Carolina, with the banquet in Charlotte now honoring all NASCAR champions except for the Cup Series, which continued to have their banquet and Champion's Week in Las Vegas. After it was canceled due to the COVID-19 pandemic in 2020, the Charlotte banquet would be discontinued in 2021, with champions from all NASCAR series being honored at the Cup Series awards banquet in Nashville.

NASCAR announced that they would bring back a banquet for all of NASCAR's regional series in Charlotte at the Convention Center in 2025.
