= Mattis Pluschkell =

German racing driver (born 2004)

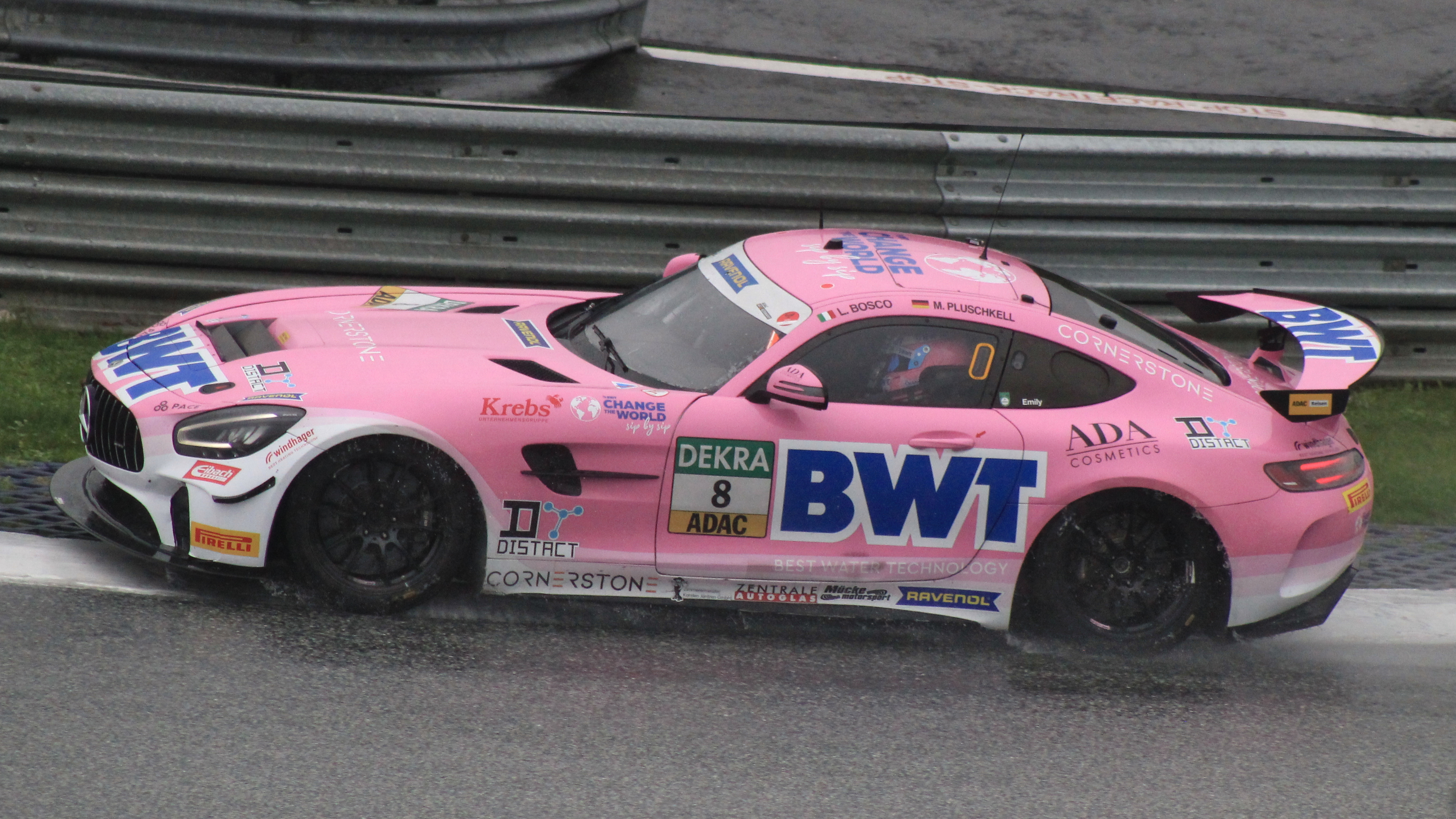
- Pluschkell in his Mercedes-AMG GT4 at the Red Bull Ring in 2024
- Nationality: (Germany) German
- Born: 9 July 2004 (age 22) Rostock, Mecklenburg-Vorpommern, Germany

Le Mans Cup career
- Debut season: 2026
- Current team: BWT Mücke Motorsport
- Categorisation: FIA Silver
- Car number: 8
- Starts: 6
- Wins: 0
- Podiums: 0
- Poles: 0
- Fastest laps: 0
- Best finish: 15th in 2026 (LMP3)

Prototype Cup Europe career
- Debut season: 2025 (PCG)
- Current team: BWT Mücke Motorsport
- Car number: 18
- Starts: 20
- Wins: 1
- Podiums: 11
- Poles: 3
- Fastest laps: 0
- Best finish: 2nd in 2025 (Junior)

Previous series
- 2024–2025 2024 2023: GT4 Winter Series; ADAC GT4 Germany; ADAC Tourenwagen Junior Cup

Mattis Pluschkell (German pronunciation: [ˈmattis plʊʃˈkɛl]; born 9 July 2004) is a German racing driver who most recently competed in the Le Mans Cup and the Prototype Cup Europe in the LMP3 class with BWT Mücke Motorsport. He competed in the now defunct Prototype Cup Germany, where he finished second.

== Career ==
=== ADAC Tourenwagen Junior Cup ===
Pluschkell began his racing career relatively late, at the age of 18. He debuted in the ADAC Tourenwagen Junior Cup driving a Volkswagen Up GTI. Pluschkell won in just his second start at the Hockenheimring. He carried this momentum throughout the rest of the season, adding four more wins and seven total podiums.

=== ADAC GT4 Germany ===
Pluschkell's main campaign during 2024 would be in the Junior Cup of the ADAC GT4 Germany series. He finished second in race one at the Nürburgring and finished 11th in the championship.

=== GT4 Winter Series ===
==== 2024 ====
Pluschkell moved up to GT4 machinery in 2024 and competed in three races of the 2024 GT4 Winter Series. He finished on the podium twice in his three starts.

==== 2025 ====
Pluschkell returned to the series in 2025, once again driving for BWT Mücke Motorsport. He won in all three of his starts at Valencia.

=== Prototype Cup Germany ===
==== 2025 ====
In 2025, Pluschkell moved up LMP3 machinery and compete in the 2025 Prototype Cup Germany driving for BWT Mücke Motorsport. This was his debut in prototypes. Joining Pluschkell was young Polish driver Maksymilian Angelard. The two drivers started the season off well, finishing second in their first race at Circuit de Spa-Francorchamps and being the highest place Junior drivers in race one. The following round at the Hockenheimring saw continued success for Pluschkell, inheriting third place in race one following a disqualification for the No. 80 car of Mikkel C. Johansen and Óscar Tunjo. Ahead of race two, Pluschkell qualified on pole, his first in the series. Pluschkell started the race for the team, and stayed in the lead before handing the car to Angelard. The Polish driver continued to lead the race and secured the duo's maiden victory in the series. The next four races proved to be successful for Pluschkell and Angelard, with their lowest finish being fifth in both races at the Norisring, and their highest being third at the Lausitzring. During race two at the Nürburgring, Pluschkell was closing in on the No. 3 car of Sven Barth for third place. Pluschkell went for a move on Barth, who defended the position and made contact with Pluschkell, causing him to spin. The No. 3 car received a penalty for causing the collision, which allowed Pluschkell and Angelard to finish in third. Competitors Danny Soufi and Pavel Lefterov clinched the title with one round to spare, however, the fight for second in the championship as well as the Junior championship was still on. Heading into the final round of the championship at the Red Bull Ring, Pluschkell and Angelard were competing against their sister No. 8 car of Riccardo Leone Cirelli and Mathias Bjerre Jakobsen for second in the standings. Despite the No. 8 car winning both races, Pluschkell and Angelard hung onto second place in the championship by just two points. They also secured the Junior Championship being the highest placed Junior drivers in the championship.

=== Prototype Cup Europe ===
==== 2026 ====
Pluschkell returned to the newly renamed Prototype Cup Europe for 2026 season, driving the No. 8 Duqueine D09 for BWT Mücke Motorsport. Partnering him would be Danish driver Tobias Bille Clausen. Pluschkell put the car on pole in qualifying for race one at Mugello. During the race, Pluschkell created a gap of 15 seconds to second place Maxim Dirickx. When Clausen took over duties from Pluschkell, Dirickx slowly closed in on the Danish driver, eventually overtaking him for the lead. Pluschkell and Clausen would have to settle for second in the end. Following a fourth place finish in race two, the duo exited the weekend third in the championship.

=== Le Mans Cup ===
==== 2026 ====
Alongside his campaign in the Prototype Cup Europe, Pluschkell reunited with Maksymilian Angelard to compete in the Le Mans Cup in the LMP3 class for BWT Mücke Motorsport.

== Racing record ==
=== Racing career summary ===
Season	Series	Team	Races	Wins	Poles	F/Laps	Podiums	Points	Position
2023	ADAC Tourenwagen Junior Cup	Georg Motorsport	12	5	2	2	7	200	**2nd**
2024	GT4 Winter Series – Pro	BWT Mücke Motorsport	3	0	0	0	2	13	17th
2024	ADAC GT4 Germany	BWT Mücke Motorsport	12	0	0	0	1	80	11th
2025	GT4 Winter Series – Club	BWT Mücke Motorsport	3	3	0	0	3	10	**3rd**
2025	Prototype Cup Germany	BWT Mücke Motorsport	12	1	1	0	7	185	**2nd**
2026	Le Mans Cup – LMP3	BWT Mücke Motorsport	6	0	0	0	0	13	15th
2026	Prototype Cup Europe	BWT Mücke Motorsport	8	0	2	0	4	113	6th

† As Pluschkell was a guest driver, he was ineligible to score points.

* Season still in progress.

=== Complete ADAC Tourenwagen Junior Cup results ===
(key) (Races in bold indicate pole position) (Races in italics indicate fastest lap)

Year	Team	Chassis	1	2	3	4	5	6	7	8	9	10	11	12	DC	Points	Ref
2023	Georg Motorsport	Volkswagen Up GTI	HOC; 1; 11	HOC; 2; 1	LAU; 1; 5	LAU; 2; 7	**NÜR**; **1**; 1	NÜR; 2; 1	OSC; 1; 3	OSC; 2; 1	ASN; 1; 4	ASN; 2; 4	**NÜR**; **3**; 1	NÜR; 4; 2	2nd	200	

=== Complete ADAC GT4 Germany results ===
(key) (Races in bold indicate pole position) (Races in italics indicate fastest lap)

Year	Team	Class	Chassis	Engine	1	2	3	4	5	6	7	8	9	10	11	12	DC	Points	Ref
2024	BWT Mücke Motorsport	Junior	Mercedes-AMG GT4	Mercedes-AMG M178 4.0 L Twin-Turbo V8	OSC; 1; 7	OSC; 2; 13	LAU; 1 DNF	LAU; 2; 13	NOR; 1; 9	NOR; 2; 11	NÜR; 1; 2	NÜR; 2; 7	RBR; 1; 5	RBR; 2 DNF	HOC; 1; 10	HOC; 2; 11	11th	80	

=== Complete GT4 Winter Series results ===
(key) (Races in bold indicate pole position) (Races in italics indicate fastest lap)

Year	Team	Class	Chassis	Engine	1	2	3	4	5	6	7	8	9	10	11	12	13	14	15	16	17	18	DC	Points	Ref
2024	BWT Mücke Motorsport	Pro	Mercedes-AMG GT4	Mercedes-AMG M178 4.0 L Twin-Turbo V8	EST; 1	EST; 2	EST; 3	POR; 1	POR; 2	POR; 3	JER; 1; 3	JER; 2; 5	JER; 3; 2	VAL; 1	VAL; 2	VAL; 3	ARA; 1	ARA; 2	ARA; 3	CAT; 1	CAT; 2	CAT; 3	11th	80	
2025	BWT Mücke Motorsport	Club	Aston Martin V8 Vantage GT4	Aston Martin 4.7 L V8	EST; 1	EST; 2	EST; 3	POR; 1	POR; 2	POR; 3	**VAL**; **1**; 1	**VAL**; **2**; 1	VAL; 3; 1	ARA; 1	ARA; 2	ARA; 3	CAT; 1	CAT; 2	CAT; 3				10	3rd	

=== Complete Prototype Cup Germany/Europe results ===
(key) (Races in bold indicate pole position) (Races in italics indicate fastest lap)

Year	Team	Class	Chassis	Engine	1	2	3	4	5	6	7	8	9	10	11	12	DC	Points	Ref
2025	BWT Mücke Motorsport	Junior	Duqueine M30 - D08	Nissan VK56DE 5.6 L V8	SPA; 1; 2	SPA; 2; 6	HOC; 1; 3	**HOC**; **2**; 1	LAU; 1; 4	LAU; 2; 3	NOR; 1; 5	NOR; 2; 5	NÜR; 1; 5	NÜR; 2; 3	RBR; 1; 3	RBR; 2; 2	2nd	185	
2026	BWT Mücke Motorsport	N/A	Duqueine D09	Toyota V35A-FTS 3.5 L Twin-Turbo V6	**MUG**; **1**; 2	MUG; 2; 4	NÜR; 1; 3	NÜR; 2; 4	MNZ; 1; 3	MNZ; 2; 5	**SPA**; **1**; 8	SPA; 2; 3					6th	113	

=== Complete Le Mans Cup results ===
(key) (Races in bold indicate pole position) (Races in italics indicate fastest lap)

Year	Team	Class	Chassis	Engine	1	2	3	4	5	6	DC	Points	Ref
2026	BWT Mücke Motorsport	LMP3	Duqueine D09	Toyota V35A-FTS 3.5 L Twin-Turbo V6	CAT; 10	LEC; Ret	LMS; 6	SPA; 13	SIL; 18	POR; 16	15th	13	
