= 2026 Prototype Cup Europe =

Motorsport season

The 2026 Prototype Cup Europe was the first season of the Prototype Cup Europe. It was a direct successor to the now defunct, Prototype Cup Germany. Organised by Creventic, in partnership with the Automobile Club de l'Ouest (ACO) and Michelin. The series contested with third-generation Le Mans Prototype 3 cars.

== Calendar ==
2026 Prototype Cup Europe

Round		Circuit	Date	Supporting
1	R1	Mugello Circuit, Scarperia e San Piero, Italy	20–22 March	24H Series; TCR Europe Touring Car Series; Radical Cup Europe
1	R2	Mugello Circuit, Scarperia e San Piero, Italy	20–22 March	24H Series; TCR Europe Touring Car Series; Radical Cup Europe
2	R1	Nürburgring, Nürburg, Rhineland-Palatinate, Germany	3–5 July	24H Series; Radical Cup Europe
2	R2	Nürburgring, Nürburg, Rhineland-Palatinate, Germany	3–5 July	24H Series; Radical Cup Europe
3	R1	Monza Circuit, Monza, Italy	31 July–2 August	Eurocup-3; Austria Formula Cup; F2000 Italian Formula Trophy
3	R2	Monza Circuit, Monza, Italy	31 July–2 August	Eurocup-3; Austria Formula Cup; F2000 Italian Formula Trophy
4	R1	Circuit de Spa-Francorchamps, Stavelot, Belgium	3–4 September	992 Endurance Cup; Caterham Motorsport Iberia
4	R2	Circuit de Spa-Francorchamps, Stavelot, Belgium	3–4 September	992 Endurance Cup; Caterham Motorsport Iberia

== Entry list ==
All cars use the Toyota V35A-FTS 3.5 L twin-turbo V6 engine and Michelin tyres.

Team	Chassis	No.	Drivers	Class	Rounds
(Germany) Aust Motorsport	Ligier JS P325	3	(Belgium) Maxim Dirickx	J	All
(Germany) Aust Motorsport	Ligier JS P325	3	(United Kingdom) Nigel Moore		2–4
(Portugal) Purple Sector	ADESS AD25	7	(Bulgaria) Pavel Lefterov		2
(Portugal) Purple Sector	ADESS AD25	7	(Bulgaria) Boris Yonchev	J	2
(Germany) BWT Mücke Motorsport	Duqueine D09	8	(Denmark) Tobias Bille Clausen	J	All
(Germany) BWT Mücke Motorsport	Duqueine D09	8	(Germany) Mattis Pluschkell		All
(Germany) BWT Mücke Motorsport	Duqueine D09	18	(Denmark) Mads Kjelde Larsen	J	All
(Germany) BWT Mücke Motorsport	Duqueine D09	18	(Germany) Markus Pommer		All
(Germany) German Motor Sports Team	Ligier JS P325	11	(Germany) Valentino Catalano	J	All
(Germany) German Motor Sports Team	Ligier JS P325	11	(Germany) Jacob Erlbacher	J	1
(Germany) German Motor Sports Team	Ligier JS P325	11	(United States) Danny Soufi		2–4
(Germany) German Motor Sports Team	Duqueine D09	12	(Colombia) Óscar Tunjo		3–4
(Germany) German Motor Sports Team	Duqueine D09	12	(United States) Jacob Williamson		3–4
(United Kingdom) P4 Racing	Ligier JS P325	27	(United Kingdom) Andrew Ferguson	T	2
(United Kingdom) P4 Racing	Ligier JS P325	27	(United Kingdom) Louis Hamilton-Smith		2
(Sweden) Allay Racing	Ligier JS P325	43	(Sweden) Linus Hellberg	T	All
(Sweden) Allay Racing	Ligier JS P325	48	(Sweden) Emil Hellberg	T	All
(Germany) LAREA GT1 Racing	Duqueine D09	49	(Germany) Zino Fahlke	J	2–4
(Germany) LAREA GT1 Racing	Duqueine D09	49	(Germany) Torsten Kratz	T	4
(Poland) Team Virage	Ligier JS P325	74	(United States) Dominique Bastien	T	1, 3–4
(Poland) Team Virage	Ligier JS P325	74	(United Kingdom) Theo Micouris	J	1, 3–4
(Poland) Team Virage	Ligier JS P325	77	(Switzerland) Maximilian Kammerlander	J	3
(Poland) Team Virage	Ligier JS P325	77	(Switzerland) Samuel Ifrid	J	3
(Italy) Henry Morrogh Racing Drivers School	Ligier JS P325	6	(Italy) Giovanni Ciccarelli		4

Icon	Legend
J	Junior
T	Trophy
G	Guest

== Results ==
Round		Circuit	Pole position	Overall Winners	Trophy Winners	Junior Winners
1	R1	(Italy) Mugello Circuit	(Germany) #8 BWT Mücke Motorsport	(Germany) #3 Aust Motorsport	(Sweden) #43 Allay Racing	(Germany) #3 Aust Motorsport
1	R1	(Italy) Mugello Circuit	(Denmark) Tobias Bille Clausen (Germany) Mattis Pluschkell	(Belgium) Maxim Dirickx	(Sweden) Emil Hellberg	(Belgium) Maxim Dirickx
1	R2	(Italy) Mugello Circuit	(Poland) #74 Team Virage	(Poland) #74 Team Virage	(Sweden) #43 Allay Racing	(Poland) #74 Team Virage
1	R2	(Italy) Mugello Circuit	(United States) Dominique Bastien (United Kingdom) Theo Micouris	(United Kingdom) Theo Micouris	(Sweden) Emil Hellberg	(United Kingdom) Theo Micouris
2	R1	(Germany) Nürburgring	(Germany) #11 German Motor Sports Team	(Germany) #11 German Motor Sports Team	(Sweden) #43 Allay Racing	(Germany) #11 German Motor Sports Team
2	R1	(Germany) Nürburgring	(Germany) Valentino Catalano (United States) Danny Soufi	(Germany) Valentino Catalano (United States) Danny Soufi	(Sweden) Emil Hellberg	(Germany) Valentino Catalano
2	R2	(Germany) Nürburgring	(Germany) #18 BWT Mücke Motorsport	(Germany) #3 Aust Motorsport	(Sweden) #43 Allay Racing	(Germany) #3 Aust Motorsport
2	R2	(Germany) Nürburgring	(Denmark) Mads Kjelde Larsen (Germany) Markus Pommer	(Belgium) Maxim Dirickx (United Kingdom) Nigel Moore	(Sweden) Emil Hellberg	(Belgium) Maxim Dirickx
3	R1	(Italy) Monza Circuit	(Germany) #11 German Motor Sports Team	(Sweden) #48 Allay Racing	(Sweden) #48 Allay Racing	(Germany) #11 German Motor Sports Team
3	R1	(Italy) Monza Circuit	(Germany) Valentino Catalano (United States) Danny Soufi	(Sweden) Emil Hellberg	(Sweden) Emil Hellberg	(Germany) Valentino Catalano
3	R2	(Italy) Monza Circuit	(Germany) #11 German Motor Sports Team	(Germany) #11 German Motor Sports Team	(Sweden) #48 Allay Racing	(Germany) #11 German Motor Sports Team
3	R2	(Italy) Monza Circuit	(Germany) Valentino Catalano (United States) Danny Soufi	(Germany) Valentino Catalano (United States) Danny Soufi	(Sweden) Emil Hellberg	(Germany) Valentino Catalano
4	R1	(Belgium) Circuit de Spa-Francorchamps	(Germany) #8 BWT Mücke Motorsport	(Sweden) #48 Allay Racing	(Sweden) #48 Allay Racing	(Germany) #3 Aust Motorsport
4	R1	(Belgium) Circuit de Spa-Francorchamps	(Denmark) Tobias Bille Clausen (Germany) Mattis Pluschkell	(Sweden) Emil Hellberg	(Sweden) Emil Hellberg	(Belgium) Maxim Dirickx
4	R2	(Belgium) Circuit de Spa-Francorchamps	(Germany) #3 Aust Motorsport	(Germany) #3 Aust Motorsport	(Sweden) #48 Allay Racing	(Germany) #3 Aust Motorsport
4	R2	(Belgium) Circuit de Spa-Francorchamps	(Belgium) Maxim Dirickx (United Kingdom) Nigel Moore	(Belgium) Maxim Dirickx (United Kingdom) Nigel Moore	(Sweden) Emil Hellberg	(Belgium) Maxim Dirickx

== Championship standings ==
Points are awarded according to the following structure:

1st	2nd	3rd	4th	5th	6th	7th	8th	9th	10th	11th	12th	13th	14th	15th
25	20	16	13	11	10	9	8	7	6	5	4	3	2	1

=== Overall ===
Pos.	Driver	Team	MUG (Italy)		NÜR (Germany)		MNZ (Italy)		SPA (Belgium)		Points
1	(Belgium) Maxim Dirickx	(Germany) Aust Motorsport	1	3	2	1	5	3	2	1	158
2	(Germany) Valentino Catalano	(Germany) German Motor Sports Team	3	5	1	2	2	1	4	2	150
3	(Sweden) Emil Hellberg	(Sweden) Allay Racing	4	2	6	3	1	2	1	4	142
4	(United States) Danny Soufi	(Germany) German Motor Sports Team			1	2	2	1	4	2	123
5	(United Kingdom) Nigel Moore	(Germany) Aust Motorsport			2	1	5	3	2	1	117
6	(Germany) Mattis Pluschkell (Denmark) Tobias Bille Clausen	(Germany) BWT Mücke Motorsport	2	4	3	4	3	5	8	3	113
7	(Sweden) Linus Hellberg	(Sweden) Allay Racing	5	7	7	6	6	8	3	5	84
8	(Denmark) Mads Kjelde Larsen (Germany) Markus Pommer	(Germany) BWT Mücke Motorsport	6	6	5	Ret	7	9	5	6	68
9	(United Kingdom) Theo Micouris	(Poland) Team Virage	7	1			9	10	6	8	65
10	(Germany) Zino Fahlke	(Germany) LAREA GT1 Racing			4	5	4	4	Ret	WD	50
11	(United States) Dominique Bastien	(Poland) Team Virage	7	WD			9	10	6	8	40
12	(Colombia) Óscar Tunjo (United States) Jacob Williamson	(Germany) German Motor Sports Team					8	7	7	7	35
13	(Germany) Jacob Erlbacher	(Germany) German Motor Sports Team	3	5							27
14	(United Kingdom) Andrew Ferguson (United Kingdom) Louis Hamilton-Smith	(United Kingdom) P4 Racing			8	7					17
15	(Bulgaria) Pavel Lefterov (Bulgaria) Boris Yonchev	(Portugal) Purple Sector			9	8					15
16	(Italy) Giovanni Ciccarelli	(Italy) Henry Morrogh Racing Drivers School							9	9	14
17	(Switzerland) Maximilian Kammerlander (Switzerland) Samuel Ifrid	(Poland) Team Virage					Ret	6			10
–	(Germany) Torsten Kratz	(Germany) LAREA GT1 Racing							Ret	WD	0
Pos.	Driver	Team	MUG (Italy)		NÜR (Germany)		MNZ (Italy)		SPA (Belgium)		Points

=== Trophy ===
Pos.	Driver	Team	MUG (Italy)		NÜR (Germany)		MNZ (Italy)		SPA (Belgium)		Points
1	(Sweden) Emil Hellberg	(Sweden) Allay Racing	1	1	1	1	1	1	1	1	200
2	(Sweden) Linus Hellberg	(Sweden) Allay Racing	2	2	2	2	2	2	2	2	160
3	(United States) Dominique Bastien	(Poland) Team Virage	3	WD			4	4	3	4	71
4	(United States) Jacob Williamson	(Germany) German Motor Sports Team					3	3	4	3	61
5	(United Kingdom) Andrew Ferguson	(United Kingdom) P4 Racing			3	3					32
6	(Italy) Giovanni Ciccarelli	(Italy) Henry Morrogh Racing Drivers School							5	5	22
–	(Germany) Torsten Kratz	(Germany) LAREA GT1 Racing							Ret	WD	0
Pos.	Driver	Team	MUG (Italy)		NÜR (Germany)		MNZ (Italy)		SPA (Belgium)		Points

=== Junior ===
Pos.	Driver	Team	MUG (Italy)		NÜR (Germany)		MNZ (Italy)		SPA (Belgium)		Points
1	(Belgium) Maxim Dirickx	(Germany) Aust Motorsport	1	2	2	1	4	2	1	1	173
2	(Germany) Valentino Catalano	(Germany) German Motor Sports Team	3	4	1	2	1	1	2	2	164
3	(Denmark) Tobias Bille Clausen	(Germany) BWT Mücke Motorsport	2	3	3	3	2	4	5	3	128
4	(Denmark) Mads Kjelde Larsen	(Germany) BWT Mücke Motorsport	4	5	5	Ret	5	6	3	4	85
5	(United Kingdom) Theo Micouris	(Poland) Team Virage	5	1			6	7	4	5	79
6	(Germany) Zino Fahlke	(Germany) LAREA GT1 Racing			4	4	3	3	Ret	WD	58
7	(Germany) Jacob Erlbacher	(Germany) German Motor Sports Team	3	4							29
8	(Bulgaria) Boris Yonchev	(Portugal) Purple Sector			6	5					21
9	(Switzerland) Maximilian Kammerlander (Switzerland) Samuel Ifrid	(Poland) Team Virage					Ret	5			11
Pos.	Driver	Team	MUG (Italy)		NÜR (Germany)		MNZ (Italy)		SPA (Belgium)		Points

=== Teams ===
==== Scoring system ====
- Results for teams are awarded independently from the drivers' championship based on the number of team entries at each round.
- Only the best result counts for teams fielding more than one entry.

Pos.	Team	Car	MUG (Italy)		NÜR (Germany)		MNZ (Italy)		SPA (Belgium)		Points
1	(Germany) Aust Motorsport	Ligier JS P325	1	3	2	1	5	3	2	1	158
2	(Germany) German Motor Sports Team	Ligier JS P325	3	5	1	2	2	1	3	2	153
3	(Sweden) Allay Racing	Ligier JS P325	4	2	5	3	1	2	1	4	143
4	(Germany) BWT Mücke Motorsport	Duqueine D09	2	4	3	4	3	5	4	3	118
5	(Poland) Team Virage	Ligier JS P325	5	1			6	6	5	5	78
6	(Germany) LAREA GT1 Racing	Duqueine D09			4	5	4	4			50
7	(Italy) Henry Morrogh Racing Drivers School	Ligier JS P325							6	6	20
8	(United Kingdom) P4 Racing	Ligier JS P325			6	6					20
9	(Portugal) Purple Sector	ADESS AD25			7	7					18
Pos.	Team	Car	MUG (Italy)		NÜR (Germany)		MNZ (Italy)		SPA (Belgium)		Points
