= 2025 Prototype Cup Germany =

Series of car races

The 2025 Prototype Cup Germany was the fourth and final season of the Prototype Cup Germany before becoming the Prototype Cup Europe. Organised and promoted by Creventic and German automobile club ADAC, the series was contested with Le Mans Prototype 3 cars.

The championship remained with the Nissan VK56 V8-engines and is therefore the only championship in Europe, in which the second generation LMP3 cars can be used.

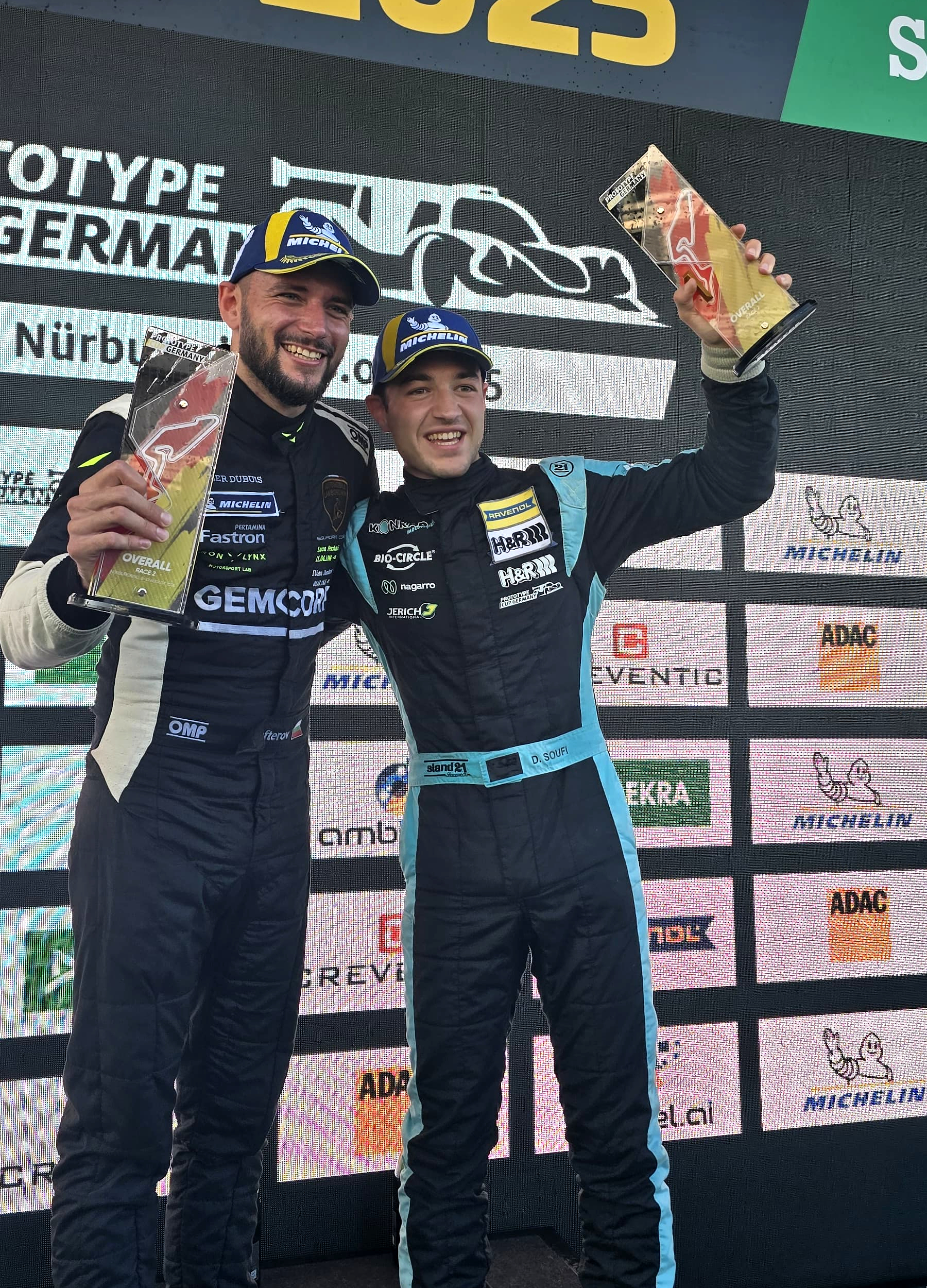
Konrad Motorsport's Soufi and Lefterov were the Drivers' champions

== Calendar ==
2025 Prototype Cup Germany

Round		Circuit	Date	Supporting
1	R1	Circuit de Spa-Francorchamps, Stavelot, Belgium	18–20 April	24H Series
1	R2	Circuit de Spa-Francorchamps, Stavelot, Belgium	18–20 April	24H Series
2	R1	Hockenheimring, Hockenheim, Germany	9–11 May	ADAC Historic; Lotus Cup Europe
2	R2	Hockenheimring, Hockenheim, Germany	9–11 May	ADAC Historic; Lotus Cup Europe
3	R1	Lausitzring, Klettwitz, Germany	23–25 May	Deutsche Tourenwagen Masters; European Truck Racing Championship; ADAC GT Masters
3	R2	Lausitzring, Klettwitz, Germany	23–25 May	Deutsche Tourenwagen Masters; European Truck Racing Championship; ADAC GT Masters
4	R1	Norisring, Nürnberg, Germany	4–6 July	Deutsche Tourenwagen Masters; ADAC GT4 Germany; Porsche Carrera Cup Germany; NXT Gen Cup
4	R2	Norisring, Nürnberg, Germany	4–6 July	Deutsche Tourenwagen Masters; ADAC GT4 Germany; Porsche Carrera Cup Germany; NXT Gen Cup
5	R1	Nürburgring, Nürburg, Rhineland-Palatinate, Germany	9–10 August	Deutsche Tourenwagen Masters; ADAC GT4 Germany; Porsche Carrera Cup Germany; NXT Gen Cup
5	R2	Nürburgring, Nürburg, Rhineland-Palatinate, Germany	9–10 August	Deutsche Tourenwagen Masters; ADAC GT4 Germany; Porsche Carrera Cup Germany; NXT Gen Cup
6	R1	Red Bull Ring, Spielberg, Austria	12–14 September	Deutsche Tourenwagen Masters; ADAC GT Masters; Porsche Carrera Cup Germany; ADAC GT4 Germany
6	R2	Red Bull Ring, Spielberg, Austria	12–14 September	Deutsche Tourenwagen Masters; ADAC GT Masters; Porsche Carrera Cup Germany; ADAC GT4 Germany

== Teams and drivers ==
Team	Chassis	No.	Drivers	Class	Rounds
(Germany) Gebhardt Intralogistics Motorsport (Note: Car No. 11 entered as Badischer Motorsport Club (BMC))	Duqueine M30 - D08	1	(Sweden) Alexzander Kristiansson	J	1–5
(Germany) Gebhardt Intralogistics Motorsport	Duqueine M30 - D08	1	(Germany) Michael Herich	T	1–4
(Germany) Gebhardt Intralogistics Motorsport	Duqueine M30 - D08	1	(Colombia) Óscar Tunjo		5
(Germany) Gebhardt Intralogistics Motorsport	Duqueine M30 - D08	11	(Germany) Valentino Catalano	J	2, 4
(Germany) Gebhardt Intralogistics Motorsport	Duqueine M30 - D08	11	(Colombia) Óscar Tunjo		4
(Germany) Gebhardt Intralogistics Motorsport	Duqueine M30 - D08	11	(Germany) Jacob Erlbacher	J	5
(Germany) Gebhardt Intralogistics Motorsport	Duqueine M30 - D08	11	(Switzerland) Jérémy Siffert	J	5
(Germany) Gebhardt Intralogistics Motorsport	Ginetta G61-LT-P3	70	(Germany) Jacob Erlbacher	J	2
(Germany) Gebhardt Intralogistics Motorsport	Ginetta G61-LT-P3	70	(Switzerland) Jérémy Siffert	J	2
(Germany) Gebhardt Intralogistics Motorsport	Duqueine M30 - D08	80	(Denmark) Mikkel C. Johansen		1–3, 5–6
(Germany) Gebhardt Intralogistics Motorsport	Duqueine M30 - D08	80	(Colombia) Óscar Tunjo		1–2
(Germany) Gebhardt Intralogistics Motorsport	Duqueine M30 - D08	80	(Germany) Valentino Catalano	J	3
(Germany) Gebhardt Intralogistics Motorsport	Duqueine M30 - D08	80	(Germany) Jacob Erlbacher	J	4
(Germany) Gebhardt Intralogistics Motorsport	Duqueine M30 - D08	80	(Switzerland) Jérémy Siffert	J	4
(Germany) Gebhardt Intralogistics Motorsport	Duqueine M30 - D08	80	(Germany) Michael Herich	T	5–6
(Austria) Konrad Motorsport	Ligier JS P320	2	(United States) Danny Soufi		All
(Austria) Konrad Motorsport	Ligier JS P320	2	(Bulgaria) Pavel Lefterov		All
(Austria) Konrad Motorsport	Ligier JS P320	22	(Germany) Zino-Ferret Fahlke	J	3, 5–6
(Germany) Aust Motorsport	Ligier JS P320	3	(Germany) Sven Barth		All
(Germany) Aust Motorsport	Ligier JS P320	3	(Belgium) Maxim Dirickx	J	All
(Slovakia) ARC Bratislava	Ligier JS P320	4	(Slovakia) Miro Konôpka	T	6
(Germany) BWT Mücke Motorsport	Duqueine M30 - D08	8	(Italy) Riccardo Leone Cirelli	J	All
(Germany) BWT Mücke Motorsport	Duqueine M30 - D08	8	(Denmark) Mathias Bjerre Jakobsen	J	All
(Germany) BWT Mücke Motorsport	Duqueine M30 - D08	18	(Poland) Maksymilian Angelard	J	All
(Germany) BWT Mücke Motorsport	Duqueine M30 - D08	18	(Germany) Mattis Pluschkell	J	All
(Belgium) Mühlner Motorsport	Duqueine M30 - D08	21	(United Arab Emirates) Keanu Al Azhari	J	1, 6
(Belgium) Mühlner Motorsport	Duqueine M30 - D08	21	(Germany) Marcel Kopp	T	6
(Germany) Rinaldi Racing	Duqueine M30 - D08	33	(Germany) Thomas Ambiel	T	All

Icon	Legend
J	Junior
T	Trophy
G	Guest

== Results ==
Round		Circuit	Pole position	Winners
1	R1	(Belgium) Circuit de Spa-Francorchamps	(Germany) No. 80 Gebhardt Motorsport	(Austria) No. 2 Konrad Motorsport
1	R1	(Belgium) Circuit de Spa-Francorchamps	(Colombia) Óscar Tunjo (Denmark) Mikkel C. Johansen	(United States) Danny Soufi (Bulgaria) Pavel Lefterov
1	R2	(Belgium) Circuit de Spa-Francorchamps	(Belgium) No. 21 Mühlner Motorsport	(Germany) No. 33 Rinaldi Racing
1	R2	(Belgium) Circuit de Spa-Francorchamps	(United Arab Emirates) Keanu Al Azhari	(Germany) Thomas Ambiel
2	R1	(Germany) Hockenheimring	(Germany) No. 8 BWT Mücke Motorsport	(Germany) No. 11 Badischer Motorsport Club
2	R1	(Germany) Hockenheimring	(Italy) Riccardo Leone Cirelli (Denmark) Mathias Bjerre Jakobsen	(Germany) Valentino Catalano
2	R2	(Germany) Hockenheimring	(Germany) No. 18 BWT Mücke Motorsport	(Germany) No. 18 BWT Mücke Motorsport
2	R2	(Germany) Hockenheimring	(Poland) Maksymilian Angelard (Germany) Mattis Pluschkell	(Poland) Maksymilian Angelard (Germany) Mattis Pluschkell
3	R1	(Germany) Lausitzring	(Austria) No. 2 Konrad Motorsport	(Austria) No. 2 Konrad Motorsport
3	R1	(Germany) Lausitzring	(United States) Danny Soufi (Bulgaria) Pavel Lefterov	(United States) Danny Soufi (Bulgaria) Pavel Lefterov
3	R2	(Germany) Lausitzring	(Germany) No. 8 BWT Mücke Motorsport	(Austria) No. 2 Konrad Motorsport
3	R2	(Germany) Lausitzring	(Italy) Riccardo Leone Cirelli (Denmark) Mathias Bjerre Jakobsen	(United States) Danny Soufi (Bulgaria) Pavel Lefterov
4	R1	(Germany) Norisring	(Germany) No. 11 Badischer Motorsport Club	(Germany) No. 11 Badischer Motorsport Club
4	R1	(Germany) Norisring	(Germany) Valentino Catalano (Colombia) Óscar Tunjo	(Germany) Valentino Catalano (Colombia) Óscar Tunjo
4	R2	(Germany) Norisring	(Germany) No. 11 Badischer Motorsport Club	(Austria) No. 2 Konrad Motorsport
4	R2	(Germany) Norisring	(Germany) Valentino Catalano (Colombia) Óscar Tunjo	(United States) Danny Soufi (Bulgaria) Pavel Lefterov
5	R1	(Germany) Nürburgring	(Germany) No. 1 Gebhardt Motorsport	(Austria) No. 2 Konrad Motorsport
5	R1	(Germany) Nürburgring	(Colombia) Óscar Tunjo (Sweden) Alexzander Kristiansson	(United States) Danny Soufi (Bulgaria) Pavel Lefterov
5	R2	(Germany) Nürburgring	(Austria) No. 2 Konrad Motorsport	(Austria) No. 2 Konrad Motorsport
5	R2	(Germany) Nürburgring	(United States) Danny Soufi (Bulgaria) Pavel Lefterov	(United States) Danny Soufi (Bulgaria) Pavel Lefterov
6	R1	(Austria) Red Bull Ring	(Germany) No. 8 BWT Mücke Motorsport	(Germany) No. 8 BWT Mücke Motorsport
6	R1	(Austria) Red Bull Ring	(Italy) Riccardo Leone Cirelli (Denmark) Mathias Bjerre Jakobsen	(Italy) Riccardo Leone Cirelli (Denmark) Mathias Bjerre Jakobsen
6	R2	(Austria) Red Bull Ring	(Belgium) No. 21 Mühlner Motorsport	(Germany) No. 8 BWT Mücke Motorsport
6	R2	(Austria) Red Bull Ring	(United Arab Emirates) Keanu Al Azhari (Germany) Marcel Kopp	(Italy) Riccardo Leone Cirelli (Denmark) Mathias Bjerre Jakobsen

=== Drivers' Championship ===
1st	2nd	3rd	4th	5th	6th	7th	8th	9th	10th	11th	12th	13th	14th	15th
25	20	16	13	11	10	9	8	7	6	5	4	3	2	1

Pos.	Driver	Team	SPA (Belgium)		HOC (Germany)		LAU (Germany)		NOR (Germany)		NÜR (Germany)		RBR (Austria)		Points
1	(United States) Danny Soufi (Bulgaria) Pavel Lefterov	(Austria) Konrad Motorsport	1	3	2	DSQ	1	1	2	1	1	1	9	4	226
2	(Poland) Maksymilian Angelard (Germany) Mattis Pluschkell	(Germany) BWT Mücke Motorsport	2	6	3	1	4	3	5	5	5	3	3	2	185
3	(Italy) Riccardo Leone Cirelli (Denmark) Mathias Bjerre Jakobsen	(Germany) BWT Mücke Motorsport	3	2	4	2	Ret	8	3	Ret	2	2	1	1	183
4	(Germany) Sven Barth (Belgium) Maxim Dirickx	(Germany) Aust Motorsport	5	7	5	3	2	2	4	3	4	5	2	3	176
5	(Germany) Thomas Ambiel	(Germany) Rinaldi Racing	6	1	8	6	6	7	6	7	9	7	7	7	124
6	(Germany) Michael Herich	(Germany) Gebhardt Motorsport	7	5	7	4	7	4	7	6	8	8	5	8	118
7	(Sweden) Alexzander Kristiansson	(Germany) Gebhardt Motorsport	7	5	7	4	7	4	7	6	3	4			112
8	(Colombia) Óscar Tunjo	(Germany) Badischer Motorsport Club							1	2					100
8	(Colombia) Óscar Tunjo	(Germany) Gebhardt Motorsport	4	4	DSQ	Ret					3	4			100
9	(Germany) Valentino Catalano	(Germany) Badischer Motorsport Club			1	7			1	2					91
9	(Germany) Valentino Catalano	(Germany) Gebhardt Motorsport					5	6							91
10	(Denmark) Mikkel C. Johansen	(Germany) Gebhardt Motorsport	4	4	DSQ	Ret					8	8	5	8	82
11	(Germany) Zino-Ferret Fahlke	(Austria) Konrad Motorsport					3	5			6	6	4	5	81
12	(Germany) Jacob Erlbacher (Switzerland) Jérémy Siffert	(Germany) Badischer Motorsport Club									7	Ret			43
12	(Germany) Jacob Erlbacher (Switzerland) Jérémy Siffert	(Germany) Gebhardt Motorsport			6	5			Ret	4					43
13	(Slovakia) Miro Konôpka	(Slovakia) ARC Bratislava											6	6	20
14	(United Arab Emirates) Keanu Al Azhari	(Belgium) Mühlner Motorsport	Ret	Ret									8	Ret	8
14	(Germany) Marcel Kopp	(Belgium) Mühlner Motorsport											8	Ret	8
Pos.	Driver	Team	SPA (Belgium)		HOC (Germany)		LAU (Germany)		NOR (Germany)		NÜR (Germany)		RBR (Austria)		Points

=== Teams' Championship ===
Pos.	Team	Points
1	(Austria) Konrad Motorsport	243
2	(Germany) BWT Mücke Motorsport	240
3	(Germany) Aust Motorsport	202
4	(Germany) Gebhardt Motorsport	170
5	(Germany) Rinaldi Racing	154
Pos.	Team	Points
