= 2024 Prototype Winter Series =

- Organizer: Gedlich Racing
- Discipline: Sports car racing
- Races: 8

Champions
- Overall - Driver: (United States) Danny Soufi
- Overall - Team: (France) ANS Motorsport
- Class 4 - Driver: (France) Iko Segret
- Class N - Driver: (Switzerland) Kevin Rabin

Prototype Winter Series
- ← none 2025 →

2024 Prototype Winter Series was the first season of the Prototype Winter Series, sports car racing series organized by Gedlich Racing and licensed by Automobile Club de l'Ouest (ACO).

== Race calendar ==
Round		Circuit	Date	Supporting	Map of circuit locations
1	R1	(Portugal) Circuito do Estoril, Estoril	13–14 January	GT Winter Series; GT4 Winter Series	2024 Prototype Winter Series is located in Iberia
1	R2	(Portugal) Circuito do Estoril, Estoril	13–14 January	GT Winter Series; GT4 Winter Series	2024 Prototype Winter Series is located in Iberia
2	R1	(Portugal) Algarve International Circuit, Portimão	20–21 January	GT Winter Series; GT4 Winter Series	2024 Prototype Winter Series is located in Iberia
2	R2	(Portugal) Algarve International Circuit, Portimão	20–21 January	GT Winter Series; GT4 Winter Series	2024 Prototype Winter Series is located in Iberia
3	R1	(Spain) MotorLand Aragón, Alcañiz	2–3 March	GT Winter Series; GT4 Winter Series; Formula Winter Series	2024 Prototype Winter Series is located in Iberia
3	R2	(Spain) MotorLand Aragón, Alcañiz	2–3 March	GT Winter Series; GT4 Winter Series; Formula Winter Series	2024 Prototype Winter Series is located in Iberia
4	R1	(Spain) Circuit de Barcelona-Catalunya, Montmeló	9–10 March	GT Winter Series; GT4 Winter Series; Formula Winter Series	2024 Prototype Winter Series is located in Iberia
4	R2	(Spain) Circuit de Barcelona-Catalunya, Montmeló	9–10 March	GT Winter Series; GT4 Winter Series; Formula Winter Series	2024 Prototype Winter Series is located in Iberia

== Vehicle classes ==
The 2024 Prototype Winter Series consists of three vehicle classes. These are:

- Class 3: LMP3; ADESS-03 EVO, Duqueine D-08, Ginetta G61-LT-P3, Ligier JS P320
- Class 4: Ligier JS P4
- Class N: Nova Proto NP02

== Entry list ==
Team	Chassis	No.	Drivers	Rounds
Class 3
(Luxembourg) DKR Engineering	Duqueine D-08	3	(United States) Jon Brownson	1, 3–4
(Luxembourg) DKR Engineering	Duqueine D-08	3	(Germany) Laurents Hörr	1, 3–4
(Luxembourg) DKR Engineering	Duqueine D-08	3	(Belgium) Tom van Rompuy	1
(Luxembourg) DKR Engineering	Duqueine D-08	3	(United States) Wyatt Brichacek	2
(Luxembourg) DKR Engineering	Duqueine D-08	3	(United Kingdom) Chris Short	2
(Germany) Konrad Motorsport	Ligier JS P320	7	(United States) Danny Soufi	All
(Germany) Konrad Motorsport	Ligier JS P320	7	(Austria) Franz Konrad	1–2
(Germany) Konrad Motorsport	Ligier JS P320	7	(Netherlands) Glenn van Berlo	3
(Luxembourg) Racing Experience	Duqueine D-08	12	(Belgium) Charles Delbrassine	1–2
(Luxembourg) Racing Experience	Duqueine D-08	12	(Luxembourg) Lea Mauer	1–2
(Belgium) Mühlner Motorsport	Duqueine D-08	18	(Norway) Emil Heyerdahl	1
(Belgium) Mühlner Motorsport	Duqueine D-08	18	(Mozambique) Rodrigo Almeida	2
(Belgium) Mühlner Motorsport	Duqueine D-08	18	(Portugal) Bernardo Pinheiro	2
(Belgium) Mühlner Motorsport	Duqueine D-08	18	(United Kingdom) Will Stowell	3
(Belgium) Mühlner Motorsport	Duqueine D-08	18	(Colombia) Juan Pablo Vega	3
(Belgium) Mühlner Motorsport	Duqueine D-08	18	(Germany) Moritz Kranz	4
(Germany) Rinaldi Racing	Duqueine D-08	33	(Germany) Sandro Holzem	1–2
(Germany) Rinaldi Racing	Duqueine D-08	33	(Germany) Juliano Holzem	1
(Germany) Rinaldi Racing	Ligier JS P320	66	(Germany) Daniel Keilwitz	All
(Germany) Rinaldi Racing	Ligier JS P320	66	(Germany) Steve Parrow	All
(France) ANS Motorsport	Ligier JS P320	42	(France) Julien Lemoine	All
(France) ANS Motorsport	Ligier JS P320	42	(France) Clément Moreno	All
(Germany) Gebhardt Motorsport	Duqueine D-08	70	(Germany) Valentino Catalano	4
(Germany) Gebhardt Motorsport	Duqueine D-08	70	(Belgium) Maxim Dirickx	4
(Germany) Gebhardt Motorsport	Duqueine D-08	80	(Germany) Valentino Catalano	3
(Germany) Gebhardt Motorsport	Duqueine D-08	80	(Belgium) Maxim Dirickx	3
(France) R-ace GP	Duqueine D-08	85	(France) Hadrien David	4
(France) R-ace GP	Duqueine D-08	85	(France) Fabien Michal	4
(Poland) Inter Europol Competition	Ligier JS P320	88	(Denmark) Sebastian Gravlund	2, 4
(Poland) Inter Europol Competition	Ligier JS P320	88	(Mozambique) Pedro Perino	2
(Poland) Inter Europol Competition	Ligier JS P320	88	(Netherlands) Rik Koen	4
Class 4
(France) ANS Motorsport	Ligier JS P4	6	(France) Iko Segret (Note: Segret entered race 1 of round 3 in Ligier JS P4 and entered race 2 in Nova NP02)	3–4
Class N
(France) ANS Motorsport	Nova Proto NP02	6	(France) Iko Segret	3
(France) ANS Motorsport	Nova Proto NP02	71	(Switzerland) Kevin Rabin	All
(France) ANS Motorsport	Nova Proto NP02	72	(France) Philippe Mondolot	4

== Race results ==
Bold indicates overall winner.

Round		Circuit	Class 3 Winners	Class 4 Winners	Class N Winners
1	R1	(Portugal) Circuito do Estoril	**(Germany) No. 33 Rinaldi Racing**	No entries	(France) No. 71 ANS Motorsport
1	R1	(Portugal) Circuito do Estoril	**(Germany) Juliano Holzem** **(Germany) Sandro Holzem**	No entries	(Switzerland) Kevin Rabin
1	R2	(Portugal) Circuito do Estoril	**(Austria) No. 7 Konrad Motorsport**	No entries	(France) No. 71 ANS Motorsport
1	R2	(Portugal) Circuito do Estoril	**(United States) Danny Soufi**	No entries	(Switzerland) Kevin Rabin
2	R1	(Portugal) Algarve International Circuit	**(France) No. 42 ANS Motorsport**	No entries	(France) No. 71 ANS Motorsport
2	R1	(Portugal) Algarve International Circuit	**(France) Julien Lemoine** **(France) Clément Moreno**	No entries	(Switzerland) Kevin Rabin
2	R2	(Portugal) Algarve International Circuit	**(Germany) No. 33 Rinaldi Racing**	No entries	(France) No. 71 ANS Motorsport
2	R2	(Portugal) Algarve International Circuit	**(Germany) Sandro Holzem**	No entries	(Switzerland) Kevin Rabin
3	R1	(Spain) MotorLand Aragón	**(Austria) No. 7 Konrad Motorsport**	No finishers	(France) No. 71 ANS Motorsport
3	R1	(Spain) MotorLand Aragón	**(Netherlands) Glenn van Berlo** **(United States) Danny Soufi**	No finishers	(Switzerland) Kevin Rabin
3	R2	(Spain) MotorLand Aragón	**(Austria) No. 7 Konrad Motorsport**	No entries	(France) No. 6 ANS Motorsport
3	R2	(Spain) MotorLand Aragón	**(Netherlands) Glenn van Berlo** **(United States) Danny Soufi**	No entries	(France) Iko Segret
4	R1	(Spain) Circuit de Barcelona-Catalunya	Cancelled due to weather conditions		
4	R2	(Spain) Circuit de Barcelona-Catalunya	**(France) No. 85 R-ace GP**	(France) No. 6 ANS Motorsport	(France) No. 71 ANS Motorsport
4	R2	(Spain) Circuit de Barcelona-Catalunya	**(France) Hadrien David** **(France) Fabien Michal**	(France) Iko Segret	(Switzerland) Kevin Rabin

== Championship standings ==
=== Points system ===
Points are awarded based on number of competitors in each class.

Position in class	Number of starters per class						
Position in class	1	2	3	4	5	6	7+
1st	5	7.5	8.33	8.75	9	9.17	9.29
2nd		2.5	5	6.25	7	7.5	7.86
3rd			1.67	3.75	5	5.83	6.43
4th				1.25	3	4.17	5
5th					1	2.5	3.57
6th						0.83	2.14
7th							0.71

=== Drivers' championships ===
==== Class 3 ====
Pos.	Driver	Team	EST (Portugal)		POR (Portugal)		ARA (Spain)		CAT (Spain)		Points
Pos.	Driver	Team	R1 (Note: Half of points were awarded for Race 1, as less than 50% of the laps were completed.)	R2	R1	R2	R1	R2	R1	R2	Points
1	(United States) Danny Soufi	(Austria) Konrad Motorsport	7	1	5	4	1	1	C	2	44.295
2	(France) Julien Lemoine (France) Clément Moreno	(France) ANS Motorsport	2	4	1	Ret	2	Ret	C	5	28.46
3	(Germany) Daniel Keilwitz (Germany) Steve Parrow	(Germany) Rinaldi Racing	5	3	6	6	3	2	C	7	25.935
4	(Germany) Laurents Hörr	(Luxembourg) DKR Engineering	3	2			4	3	C	4	25.715
5	(Germany) Sandro Holzem	(Germany) Rinaldi Racing	1	DNS	3	1					20.365
6	(Netherlands) Glenn van Berlo	(Germany) Konrad Motorsport					1	1			18.34
7	(United States) Jon Brownson	(Luxembourg) DKR Engineering	WD	WD			4	3	C	4	15
8	(Denmark) Sebastian Gravlund	(Poland) Inter Europol Competition			DNS	2			C	3	14.29
9	(United States) Wyatt Brichacek (United Kingdom) Chris Short	(Luxembourg) DKR Engineering			2	5					11.43
10	(Mozambique) Rodrigo Almeida (Portugal) Bernardo Pinheiro	(Belgium) Mühlner Motorsport			4	3					11.43
11	(Belgium) Tom van Rompuy	(Luxembourg) DKR Engineering	3	2							10.715
12	(France) Hadrien David (France) Fabien Michal	(France) R-ace GP							C	1	9.29
13	(Mozambique) Pedro Perino	(Poland) Inter Europol Competition			DNS	2					7.86
14	(Germany) Valentino Catalano (Belgium) Maxim Dirickx	(Germany) Gebhardt Motorsport					5	4	C	Ret	6.67
15	(Netherlands) Rik Koen	(Poland) Inter Europol Competition							C	3	6.43
16	(Norway) Emil Heyerdahl	(Belgium) Mühlner Motorsport	4	5							5
17	(Germany) Juliano Holzem	(Germany) Rinaldi Racing	1	DNS							4.645
18	(United Kingdom) Will Stowell (Colombia) Juan Pablo Vega	(Belgium) Mühlner Motorsport					6	5			3.33
19	(Belgium) Charles Delbrassine (Luxembourg) Lea Mauer	(Luxembourg) Racing Experience	6	6	7	7					3.32
20	(Germany) Moritz Kranz	(Belgium) Mühlner Motorsport							C	6	2.14
–	(Austria) Franz Konrad	(Germany) Konrad Motorsport	WD	WD	WD	WD					–

==== Class 4 ====
Pos.	Driver	Team	EST (Portugal)		POR (Portugal)		ARA (Spain)		CAT (Spain)		Points
Pos.	Driver	Team	R1	R2	R1	R2	R1	R2	R1	R2	Points
1	(France) Iko Segret	(France) ANS Motorsport					Ret		C	1	5

==== Class N ====
Pos.	Driver	Team	EST (Portugal)		POR (Portugal)		ARA (Spain)		CAT (Spain)		Points
Pos.	Driver	Team	R1	R2	R1	R2	R1	R2	R1	R2	Points
1	(Switzerland) Kevin Rabin	(France) ANS Motorsport	1	1	1	1	1	2	C	1	32.5
2	(France) Iko Segret	(France) ANS Motorsport						1			7.5
3	(France) Philippe Mondolot	(France) ANS Motorsport							C	2	2.5

=== Teams' championships ===
==== Class 3 ====
Pos.	Team	EST (Portugal)		POR (Portugal)		ARA (Spain)		CAT (Spain)		Points
Pos.	Team	R1	R2	R1	R2	R1	R2	R1	R2	Points
1	(Austria) No. 7 Konrad Motorsport	7	1	5	4	1	1	C	2	44.295
2	(Luxembourg) No. 3 DKR Engineering	3	2	2	5	4	3	C	4	37.145
3	(France) No. 42 ANS Motorsport	2	4	1	Ret	2	Ret	C	5	28.46
4	(Germany) No. 66 Rinaldi Racing	5	3	6	6	3	2	C	7	25.935
5	(Belgium) No. 18 Mühlner Motorsport	4	5	4	3	6	5	C	6	21.9
6	(Germany) No. 33 Rinaldi Racing	1	DNS	3	1					20.305
7	(Poland) No. 88 Inter Europol Competition			DNS	2			C	3	14.29
8	(France) No. 85 R-ace GP							C	1	9.29
9	(Germany) No. 80 Gebhardt Motorsport					6	4			6.67
10	(Luxembourg) No. 12 Racing Experience	6	6	7	7					3.32
–	(Germany) No. 70 Gebhardt Motorsport							C	Ret	–

==== Class 4 ====
Pos.	Team	EST (Portugal)		POR (Portugal)		ARA (Spain)		CAT (Spain)		Points
Pos.	Team	R1	R2	R1	R2	R1	R2	R1	R2	Points
1	(France) No. 6 ANS Motorsport					Ret		C	1	5

==== Class N ====
Pos.	Team	EST (Portugal)		POR (Portugal)		ARA (Spain)		CAT (Spain)		Points
Pos.	Team	R1	R2	R1	R2	R1	R2	R1	R2	Points
1	(France) No. 71 ANS Motorsport	1	1	1	1	1	2	C	1	32.5
2	(France) No. 6 ANS Motorsport						1			7.5
3	(France) No. 72 ANS Motorsport							C	2	2.5
