= Theo Micouris =

British and Cypriot racing driver (born 2006)

- Nationality: (United Kingdom) British (Cyprus) Cypriot via dual nationality
- Born: 16 May 2006 (age 20) Bedford, United Kingdom
- Categorisation: FIA Silver

Championship titles
- 2024 2023: Ligier European Series – JS P4; Hagerty Radical SR1 Cup

Theo Maximilian Micouris (born 16 May 2006 in Bedford) is a British and Cypriot racing driver and sim racer who last competed in Prototype Cup Europe for Team Virage.

== Early career ==
Micouris began karting at seven years old. During his tenure in karts, he also represented the UK in the Karting Academy Trophy in 2020, finishing joint third on points.

After winning both the 2023 Radical UK SR1 and overall Championships, Micouris made his debut in the GB4 Championship with Elite Motorsport. In his only round in the series, Micouris scored a best result of sixth twice, in both races one and three. In 2024, Micouris joined Team Virage alongside Haydn Chance to compete in the Ligier European Series. Micouris won both races at Barcelona and race two at Paul Ricard to kick off the season with the points lead, which he kept until the end of the season, winning the Ligier European Series title at the finale in Algarve.

After testing LMP3 cars at the end of 2024, Micouris stayed with Team Virage to step up to the Michelin Le Mans Cup. Micouris finished fourth on his LMP3 debut at Barcelona, before following that up with an eighth at Le Castellet and his maiden podium of the season at the Road to Le Mans, followed by another podium in the following round at Spa by finishing third en route to fifth in points. During 2025, Micouris also made a one-off appearance for Nielsen Racing at the Barcelona round of the Euroformula Open Championship, in which he finished second in race three.

In early 2026, Micouris joined Bretton Racing to race in the final round of the 2025–26 Asian Le Mans Series at Abu Dhabi, scoring a best result of fifth in race two. For the rest of the year, Micouris remained in LMP3 competition as he returned to Team Virage to race in Prototype Cup Europe alongside Dom Bastien. Starting off the season at Mugello, Micouris finished seventh in race one, before winning race two from pole position, which turned out to be his only win of the season as he ended the year ninth in points.

== Esports career ==
In 2022, Micouris took part in the ROKiT - Racing Star F4 Esports Competition UK, taking a win at Hockenheimring and ending runner-up to Deagen Fairclough in the Grand Final.

== Karting record ==
=== Karting career summary ===
Season	Series	Team	Position
2016	Shenington Winter Championship – Honda Cadet		1st
2016	Bayford Meadows Championship – Honda Cadet		2nd
2016	TVKC Championship – Honda Cadet		3rd
2016	Kartmasters British GP – Honda Cadet		5th
2017	WMKC Championship - Honda Cadet		1st
2017	TVKC Championship - Honda Cadet		2nd
2017	O Plate Championship - Honda Cadet		2nd
2017	E Plate Championship - Honda Cadet		2nd
2017	Kartmasters British GP – Honda Cadet	Privateer	4th
2017	Super One Series – Honda Cadet	Privateer	7th
2018	Kartmasters British GP – Honda Cadet	Privateer	1st
2018	WMKC Championship – Honda Cadet	Privateer	1st
2018	TVKC Championship – Honda Cadet	Privateer	1st
2018	Super One Series – Honda Cadet	Privateer	4th
2019	WMKC Championship – X30 Mini	Croc Promotion	1st
2019	Shenington Winter Championship – X30 Mini	Croc Promotion	1st
2019	British Kart Championship – X30 Mini	Croc Promotion	2nd
2019	Motorsport UK Kartmasters Grand Prix – X30 Mini	Croc Promotion	5th
2020	TVKC Winter Championship – X30 Jnr	Mike Spencer Motorsport	1st
2020	FIA Karting Academy Trophy	Dino Micouris	4th
2021	Kartmasters British GP – X30 Senior	Mick Barrett Racing	22nd
2022	Kartmasters British GP – Rotax Senior	JDR	31st

== Racing record ==
=== Racing career summary ===
Season	Series	Team	Races	Wins	Poles	F/Laps	Podiums	Points	Position
2023	Hagerty Radical SR1 Cup	Hart GT / RAW Motorsports	18	9	14	15	17	873	**1st**
2023	GB4 Championship	Elite Motorsport	3	0	0	0	0	44	19th
2024	Ligier European Series – JS P4	Team Virage	11	3	3	7	9	200	**1st**
2025	Le Mans Cup – LMP3	Team Virage	7	0	0	0	2	58	5th
2025	Euroformula Open Championship	Nielsen Racing	3	0	0	0	1	32	11th
2025–26	Asian Le Mans Series – LMP3	Bretton Racing	2	0	0	0	0	6	20th
2026	Prototype Cup Europe	Team Virage	6	1	1	0	1	65	9th
2026	Le Mans Cup – LMP3 Pro-Am	Team Virage	0	0	0	0	0	0	NC†

=== Complete GB4 Championship results ===
(key) (Races in bold indicate pole position) (Races in italics indicate fastest lap)

Year	Team	1	2	3	4	5	6	7	8	9	10	11	12	13	14	15	16	17	18	19	20	21	22	DC	Points
2023	Elite Motorsport	OUL; 1	OUL; 2	OUL; 3	SIL1; 1	SIL1; 2	SIL1; 3	DON1; 1	DON1; 2	DON1; 3	DON1; 4	SNE; 1	SNE; 2	SNE; 3	SIL2; 1	SIL2; 2	SIL2; 3	BRH; 1	BRH; 2	BRH; 3	DON2; 1; 6	DON2; 2; 7	DON2; 3; 6^{2}	19th	44

=== Complete Ligier European Series results ===
(key) (Races in bold indicate pole position; results in italics indicate fastest lap)

Year	Entrant	Class	Chassis	1	2	3	4	5	6	7	8	9	10	11	Rank	Points
2024	Team Virage	JS P4	Ligier JS P4	CAT; 1; 1	**CAT**; **2**; 1	**LEC**; **1**; 3	LEC; 2; 1	LMS; 4	SPA; 1; 6	SPA; 2; 2	MUG; 1; 2	MUG; 2; 2	ALG; 1; 2	**ALG**; **2**; 2	1st	200

=== Complete Le Mans Cup results ===
(key) (Races in bold indicate pole position; results in italics indicate fastest lap)

Year	Entrant	Class	Chassis	1	2	3	4	5	6	7	Rank	Points
2025	Team Virage	LMP3	Ligier JS P325	CAT; 4	LEC; 8	LMS; 1; 3	LMS; 2; 6	SPA; 3	SIL; 8	ALG; 5	5th	58
2026	Team Virage	LMP3 Pro-Am	Ligier JS P325	BAR	LEC	LMS; WD	SPA	SIL	POR		NC†	0†

=== Complete Euroformula Open Championship results ===
(key) (Races in bold indicate pole position) (Races in italics indicate fastest lap)

Year	Entrant	1	2	3	4	5	6	7	8	9	10	11	12	13	14	15	16	17	18	19	20	21	22	23	24	DC	Points
2025	Nielsen Racing	PRT; 1	PRT; 2	PRT; 3	SPA; 1	SPA; 2	SPA; 3	HOC; 1	HOC; 2	HOC; 3	HUN; 1	HUN; 2	HUN; 3	LEC; 1	LEC; 2	LEC; 3	RBR; 1	RBR; 2	RBR; 3	CAT; 1; 5	CAT; 2; 8	CAT; 3; 2	MNZ; 1	MNZ; 2	MNZ; 3	11th	32

=== Complete Asian Le Mans Series results ===
(key) (Races in bold indicate pole position) (Races in italics indicate fastest lap)

Year	Team	Class	Car	Engine	1	2	3	4	5	6	Pos.	Points
2025–26	Bretton Racing	LMP3	Ligier JS P325	Toyota V35A 3.5 L V6	SEP; 1	SEP; 2	DUB; 1	DUB; 2	ABU; 1; 7	ABU; 2; 5 (Note: Micouris did not fulfil his mandated minimum drive time during race 2 of the 2026 4 Hours of Abu Dhabi, meaning that he did not receive points for that event.)	13th	30

=== Complete Prototype Cup Europe results ===
(key) (Races in bold indicate pole position) (Races in italics indicate fastest lap)

Year	Team	Car	1	2	3	4	5	6	7	8	Pos.	Points
2026	Team Virage	Ligier JS P325	MUG; 1; 7	**MUG**; **2**; 1	NÜR; 1	NÜR; 2	MNZ; 1; 9	MNZ; 2; 10	SPA; 1; 6	SPA; 2; 8	9th	65
