= Prototype Winter Series =

Sports car racing series based in Iberia

- Category: LMP3
- Country: Portugal, Spain
- Inaugural season: 2024
- Drivers: 16
- Teams: 10
- Official website: Prototype Winter Series

The Prototype Winter Series is a sports car racing series based in Iberia organized by Gedlich Racing and licensed by the Automobile Club de l'Ouest (ACO) since 2024.

The race weekend consists of two, 50 minute plus 1 lap races for one or two drivers per car.

== Cars ==
The inaugural season saw three classes eligible to compete, Class 3 (LMP3), Class 4 (Ligier JS P4) and Class N (Novo NP02). For 2025, only Generation 1 and 2 LMP3 cars were eligible.

== Champions ==
=== Drivers ===
| Year | Class 3 | Class 4 | Class N |
|---|---|---|---|
| 2024 | (United States) Danny Soufi | (France) Iko Segret | (Switzerland) Kevin Rabin |
| Year | LMP3 | | |
| 2025 | (United States) Danny Soufi | | |

=== Teams ===
| Year | Class 3 | Class 4 | Class N |
|---|---|---|---|
| 2024 | (Austria) Konrad Motorsport | (France) ANS Motorsport | (France) ANS Motorsport |
| Year | LMP3 | | |
| 2025 | (Austria) Konrad Motorsport | | |

== Circuits ==
- (Portugal) Circuito do Estoril (2024–2025)
- (Portugal) Algarve International Circuit (2024–2025)
- (Spain) MotorLand Aragón (2024–present)
- (Spain) Circuit de Barcelona-Catalunya (2024–present)
