= 2016 Deutscher Tourenwagen Cup =

Motor racing competition in Germany

The 2016 Deutscher Tourenwagen Cup was the twenty-second season of the Deutscher Tourenwagen Cup, the German championship for touring cars, and the first under its current name after dropping the ADAC name. For this season a new category - Superproduction - was introduced, replacing Division 1, while Divisions 2 and 3 were reclassified as Production 1 and Production 2 respectively. Despite not using the ADAC name the series supported the ADAC GT Masters and its support series. The calendar consisted of eight separate race weekends with two races each, spread over eight different tracks.

== Teams and drivers ==
Dunlop was the official tyre supplier.

Team	Car	No.	Drivers	Rounds
Superproduction
(Germany) Team Dombek	Mini John Cooper Works	1	(Sweden) Fredrik Lestrup	1–4
(Germany) Wolf Racing	Ford Fiesta ST	3	(Germany) Heiko Hammel	All
(Germany) BASTUCK Motorsport	Kia pro Cee'd GT/R	4	(Austria) Bernhard Wagner	5–8
(Germany) BASTUCK Motorsport	Kia pro Cee'd GT/R	5	(Germany) Alexander Rambow	All
(Germany) BASTUCK Motorsport	Kia pro Cee'd GT/R	22	(Germany) Thomas Winkelhock	4
(Germany) BASTUCK Motorsport	Ford Fiesta ST	6	(Germany) Christian Schmitz	1
(Germany) BASTUCK Motorsport	Ford Fiesta ST	14	(Germany) Steve Kirsch	3
(Germany) BASTUCK Motorsport	Ford Fiesta ST	15	(Germany) Michael Bräutigam	2
(Switzerland) Vukovic Motorsport	Audi S3 Saloon	7	(Switzerland) Milenko Vukovic	All
(Switzerland) Vukovic Motorsport	Audi S3 Saloon	8	(Croatia) Franjo Kovac	All
(Switzerland) Vukovic Motorsport	Renault Clio IV RS	9	(Czech Republic) Tomas Pekar	6–8
(Germany) Caisley AEG ID	Mini John Cooper Works	17	(Germany) Reinhard Nehls	1–5
(Germany) Caisley AEG ID	Mini John Cooper Works	18	(Germany) Kai Jordan	1–2
Production 1
(Germany) IMC Motorsport	Mini John Cooper Works	33	(Germany) Victoria Froß	All
(Germany) IMC Motorsport	Mini John Cooper Works	41	(Germany) Markus Spitzenberger	1–2
(Germany) IMC Motorsport	Mini John Cooper Works	50	(Germany) Jeremy Krüger	5
(Germany) IMC Motorsport	Mini John Cooper Works	90	(Germany) Dominique Schaak	1–5
(Germany) Mini Racing Team	Mini John Cooper Works	44	(Germany) Dirk Lauth	All
(Germany) JAS Rennsport	Citroën DS3	46	(Germany) Alf Ahrens	1–2
(Germany) Glatzel Racing	Ford Fiesta ST	79	(Germany) Ronny Reinsberger	1–2, 4, 6–8
(Germany) Glatzel Racing	Ford Fiesta ST	82	(Germany) Steffen Schwan	1–3, 5–8
(Germany) Glatzel Racing	Ford Fiesta ST	83	(Germany) Ralf Glatzel	All
(Germany) Caisley AEG ID	Mini John Cooper Works	81	(Germany) Cora Schumacher	5–7
Production 2
(Germany) Konrad Motorsport	Volkswagen Scirocco R	92	(Germany) Heiko Fulsche	1–2, 4–6
(Germany) Konrad Motorsport	Volkswagen Scirocco R	97	(Bulgaria) Pavel Lefterov	4–8
(Germany) HTF Motorsport	Volkswagen Scirocco R	93	(Germany) Thomas Mühlenz	1
(Germany) HTF Motorsport	Volkswagen Scirocco R	94	(Germany) Thomas Fulsche	2, 4, 7
(Germany) HTF Motorsport	Volkswagen Scirocco R	95	(Germany) Kevin Metzner	1–2, 5
(Germany) HTF Motorsport	Volkswagen Scirocco R	98	(Germany) John Kevin Grams	6–7
(Germany) HTF Motorsport	Volkswagen Scirocco R	99	(Germany) Matthias Meyer	5–6

== Race calendar and results ==
Round		Circuit	Date	Pole position	Fastest lap	Winning driver	Winning team	Winner Production 1	Winner Production 2
1	R1	(Germany) Motorsport Arena Oschersleben	16 April	(Germany) Heiko Hammel	(Sweden) Fredrik Lestrup	(Sweden) Fredrik Lestrup	(Germany) Team Dombek	(Germany) Ralf Glatzel	(Germany) Thomas Mühlenz
1	R2	(Germany) Motorsport Arena Oschersleben	17 April		(Sweden) Fredrik Lestrup	(Sweden) Fredrik Lestrup	(Germany) Team Dombek	(Germany) Markus Spitzenberger	(Germany) Kevin Metzner
2	R3	(Germany) Sachsenring	30 April	(Germany) Heiko Hammel	(Switzerland) Milenko Vukovic	(Germany) Heiko Hammel	(Germany) Wolf Racing	(Germany) Markus Spitzenberger	(Germany) Kevin Metzner
2	R4	(Germany) Sachsenring	1 May		(Sweden) Fredrik Lestrup	(Sweden) Fredrik Lestrup	(Germany) Team Dombek	(Germany) Ralf Glatzel	(Germany) Kevin Metzner
3	R5	(Netherlands) Circuit Park Zandvoort	14 May	(Sweden) Fredrik Lestrup	(Sweden) Fredrik Lestrup	(Sweden) Fredrik Lestrup	(Germany) Team Dombek	(Germany) Ralf Glatzel	No drivers entered
3	R6	(Netherlands) Circuit Park Zandvoort	15 May		(Germany) Heiko Hammel	(Germany) Heiko Hammel	(Germany) Wolf Racing	(Germany) Dominique Schaak	No drivers entered
4	R7	(Germany) Motorsport Arena Oschersleben	18 June	(Germany) Heiko Hammel	(Germany) Heiko Hammel	(Germany) Heiko Hammel	(Germany) Wolf Racing	(Germany) Ralf Glatzel	(Germany) Thomas Fulsche
4	R8	(Germany) Motorsport Arena Oschersleben	19 June		(Germany) Heiko Hammel	(Germany) Heiko Hammel	(Germany) Wolf Racing	(Germany) Dominique Schaak	(Bulgaria) Pavel Lefterov
5	R9	(Austria) Red Bull Ring	23 July	(Bulgaria) Pavel Lefterov	(Switzerland) Milenko Vukovic	(Switzerland) Milenko Vukovic	(Switzerland) Vukovic Motorsport	(Germany) Dirk Lauth	(Germany) Matthias Meyer
5	R10	(Austria) Red Bull Ring	24 July		(Croatia) Franjo Kovac	(Croatia) Franjo Kovac	(Switzerland) Vukovic Motorsport	(Germany) Dirk Lauth	(Germany) Matthias Meyer
6	R11	(Germany) Nürburgring	6 August	(Germany) Heiko Hammel	(Switzerland) Milenko Vukovic	(Switzerland) Milenko Vukovic	(Switzerland) Vukovic Motorsport	(Germany) Dirk Lauth	(Germany) Matthias Meyer
6	R12	(Germany) Nürburgring	7 August		(Switzerland) Milenko Vukovic	(Switzerland) Milenko Vukovic	(Switzerland) Vukovic Motorsport	(Germany) Victoria Froß	(Bulgaria) Pavel Lefterov
7	R13	(Belgium) Circuit Zolder	17 September	(Germany) Heiko Hammel	(Switzerland) Milenko Vukovic	(Switzerland) Milenko Vukovic	(Switzerland) Vukovic Motorsport	(Germany) Ralf Glatzel	(Bulgaria) Pavel Lefterov
7	R14	(Belgium) Circuit Zolder	18 September		(Switzerland) Milenko Vukovic	(Germany) Heiko Hammel	(Switzerland) Vukovic Motorsport	(Germany) Ralf Glatzel	(Bulgaria) Pavel Lefterov
8	R15	(Belgium) Circuit de Spa-Francorchamps	8 October	(Germany) Heiko Hammel	(Switzerland) Milenko Vukovic	(Switzerland) Milenko Vukovic	(Switzerland) Vukovic Motorsport	(Germany) Ralf Glatzel	(Bulgaria) Pavel Lefterov
8	R16	(Belgium) Circuit de Spa-Francorchamps	9 October		(Switzerland) Milenko Vukovic	(Switzerland) Milenko Vukovic	(Switzerland) Vukovic Motorsport	(Germany) Ralf Glatzel	(Bulgaria) Pavel Lefterov

== Championship standings ==
=== Drivers' Championship ===
Pos	Driver	OSC (Germany)		SAC (Germany)		ZAN (Netherlands)		OSC (Germany)		RBR (Austria)		NÜR (Germany)		ZOL (Belgium)		SPA (Belgium)		Points
Superproduction
1	(Switzerland) Milenko Vukovic			2	2	3	2	3		1		1	1	1	1	1	1	136
2	(Germany) Heiko Hammel	2	2	1		2	1	1	1	2	3	2	2		2	2	2	132
5	(Croatia) Franjo Kovac										1	3		2				77
4	(Sweden) Fredrik Lestrup	1	1	3	1	1												50
5	(Germany) Alexander Rambow		3					2		3								45
6	(Germany) Reinhard Nehls								2		2		3	3				41
7	(Austria) Bernhard Wagner																	28
8	(Czech Republic) Tomas Pekar														3	3	3	23
9	(Germany) Kai Jordan	3			3													16
10	(Germany) Steve Kirsch						3											10
11	(Germany) Thomas Winkelhock								3									6
12	(Germany) Michael Bräutigam																	2
13	(Germany) Christian Schmitz																	1
Production 1
1	(Germany) Dirk Lauth	1																134
2	(Germany) Victoria Froß		3															112
3	(Germany) Ralf Glatzel	2	2															111
4	(Germany) Dominique Schaak	3																64
5	(Germany) Ronny Reinsberger																	42
6	(Germany) Cora Schumacher																	36
7	(Germany) Steffen Schwan																	34
8	(Germany) Markus Spitzenberger		1	1														23
9	(Germany) Alf Ahrens																	7
10	(Germany) Jeremy Krüger																	5
Production 2
1	(Bulgaria) Pavel Lefterov																	104
2	(Germany) Heiko Fulsche																	61
3	(Germany) Kevin Metzner																	44
4	(Germany) Matthias Meyer																	43
5	(Germany) Thomas Fulsche																	40
6	(Germany) Thomas Mühlenz																	20
7	(Germany) John Kevin Grams																	18
Pos	Driver	OSC (Germany)		SAC (Germany)		ZAN (Netherlands)		OSC (Germany)		RBR (Austria)		NÜR (Germany)		ZOL (Belgium)		SPA (Belgium)		Points

Colour	Result
Gold	Winner
Silver	Second place
Bronze	Third place
Green	Points finish
Blue	Non-points finish
Blue	Non-classified finish (NC)
Purple	Retired (Ret)
Red	Did not qualify (DNQ)
Red	Did not pre-qualify (DNPQ)
Black	Disqualified (DSQ)
White	Did not start (DNS)
White	Withdrew (WD)
White	Race cancelled (C)
Blank	Did not practice (DNP)
Blank	Did not arrive (DNA)
Blank	Excluded (EX)

**Bold** – Pole
Italics – Fastest Lap

Position	1st	2nd	3rd	4th	5th	6th	7th	8th
Points	10	8	6	5	4	3	2	1

- Additionally 1 points is given for pole and 1 point for fastest lap
