= 2025 NXT Gen Cup season =

The 2025 NXT Gen Cup was the third season of NXT Gen Cup, world’s first fully electric junior touring car cup. It began at Motorsport Arena Oschersleben on 25 April and ended at Sachsenring on 24 August.

== Calendar ==
Round	Circuit	Date	Supporting
1	Motorsport Arena Oschersleben, Oschersleben, Germany	25–27 April	Deutsche Tourenwagen Masters; ADAC GT4 Germany; ADAC Tourenwagen Junior Cup
2	Norisring, Nuremberg, Germany	4–6 July	Deutsche Tourenwagen Masters; ADAC GT4 Germany; Prototype Cup Germany; Porsche Carrera Cup Germany
3	Nürburgring, Nürburg, Germany	8–10 August	Deutsche Tourenwagen Masters; ADAC GT4 Germany; Prototype Cup Germany; Porsche Carrera Cup Germany
4	Sachsenring, Hohenstein-Ernstthal, Germany	22–24 August	Deutsche Tourenwagen Masters; ADAC GT4 Germany; Prototype Cup Germany

== Entry list ==
All of the drivers used the LRT NXT1.

No.	Driver	Rounds
2	(Austria) Andreas Kapfinger	All
4	(Latvia) Patricija Stalidzāne	All
5	(Germany) Bennet Ehrl	All
7	(Germany) Julian Würtele	All
8	(Norway) Olav Vaa	2
9	(Netherlands) Lukas Stiefelhagen	All
10	(Netherlands) Misha Charoudin	3
12	(Czech Republic) Filip Bartoš	1, 4
15	(Germany) Theo Wieder	All
17	(Germany) Viviann Ehrl	1–3
19	(Sweden) Alexander Gustafsson	All
21	(Sweden) Siri Hökfelt	All
22	(Germany) Lennart Wolf	All
25	(Netherlands) Bente Boer	4
33	(Germany) Sean Terre	1–2
35	(Germany) Benjamin Mazatis	1–3
48	(Germany) Sophie Hofmann	1
67	(Germany) Maxim Dacher	All
71	(Austria) Philipp Dietrich	All
73	(Liechtenstein) Linda Frey	All
88	(Luxembourg) Pit Venanzi	2–4
95	(Germany) Finn Mache	4
99	(Sweden) Vera Jurland	All

Icon	Class
	Guest Starter

- Laurenz Rühl was set to compete in the season, but did not appear in any round. He competed in ADAC GT4 Germany instead.

== Results ==
Round		Circuit	Pole position	Fastest lap	Winning driver
1	R1	(Germany) Motorsport Arena Oschersleben	(Netherlands) Lukas Stiefelhagen	(Latvia) Patricija Stalidzāne	(Austria) Philipp Dietrich
1	R2	(Germany) Motorsport Arena Oschersleben		(Netherlands) Lukas Stiefelhagen	(Germany) Maxim Dacher
1	R3	(Germany) Motorsport Arena Oschersleben	(Austria) Philipp Dietrich	(Netherlands) Lukas Stiefelhagen	(Netherlands) Lukas Stiefelhagen
1	R4	(Germany) Motorsport Arena Oschersleben		(Czech Republic) Filip Bartoš	(Germany) Julian Würtele
2	R1	(Germany) Norisring	(Germany) Benjamin Mazatis	(Latvia) Patricija Stalidzāne	(Netherlands) Lukas Stiefelhagen
2	R2	(Germany) Norisring		(Germany) Maxim Dacher	(Netherlands) Lukas Stiefelhagen
2	R3	(Germany) Norisring		(Germany) Maxim Dacher	(Netherlands) Lukas Stiefelhagen
3	R1	(Germany) Nürburgring	(Netherlands) Lukas Stiefelhagen	(Germany) Maxim Dacher	(Netherlands) Lukas Stiefelhagen
3	R2	(Germany) Nürburgring		(Latvia) Patricija Stalidzāne	(Netherlands) Lukas Stiefelhagen
3	R3	(Germany) Nürburgring		(Germany) Maxim Dacher	(Netherlands) Lukas Stiefelhagen
4	R1	(Germany) Sachsenring	(Latvia) Patricija Stalidzāne	(Germany) Lennart Wolf	(Germany) Maxim Dacher
4	R2	(Germany) Sachsenring		(Germany) Maxim Dacher	(Sweden) Siri Hökfelt
4	R3	(Germany) Sachsenring	(Latvia) Patricija Stalidzāne	(Sweden) Alexander Gustafsson	(Latvia) Patricija Stalidzāne
4	R4	(Germany) Sachsenring		(Germany) Maxim Dacher	(Germany) Maxim Dacher

== Championship standings ==
=== Scoring system ===
Position	**1st**	**2nd**	**3rd**	**4th**	**5th**	**6th**	**7th**	**8th**	**9th**	**10th**	**11th**	**12th**	**13th**	**14th**	**15th**	**16th**	**FL**
Points	30	25	21	17	14	12	10	9	8	7	6	5	4	3	2	1	1

Additionally, the top three placed drivers in qualifying also receive points:

Qualifying position	**1st**	**2nd**	**3rd**
Points	4	2	1

=== Drivers' championship ===
Pos.	Driver	OSC (Germany)				NOR (Germany)			NÜR (Germany)			SAC (Germany)				Points
1	(Netherlands) Lukas Stiefelhagen	**3^{1}**	2	1	3	1	1	1	**1^{1}**	1	1	3^{3}	4	4	2	368
2	(Germany) Maxim Dacher	6	1	3^{2}	7	2^{3}	13	2	4	2	4	1	5	6^{2}	1	283
3	(Sweden) Alexander Gustafsson	4^{3}	5	5	5	6	4	7	5^{2}	3	2	4	6	2^{3}	4	234
4	(Latvia) Patricija Stalidzāne	2	4	DNS^{3}	9	3	6	3	Ret	8	5	**2**	7	**1**	3	225
5	(Austria) Philipp Dietrich	1^{2}	3	2^{1}	4	4^{2}	15	6	3	6	3	5^{2}	8	16	7	222
6	(Germany) Julian Würtele	9	7	6	1	8	2	5	6	16	DNS	8	2	5	5	183
7	(Germany) Lennart Wolf	5	14	4	2	13	8	10	2^{3}	5	6	11	15	7	11	156
8	(Sweden) Siri Hökfelt	8	8	11	12	10	7	11	11	9	10	7	1	14	10	123
9	(Germany) Benjamin Mazatis	14	9	7	14	5^{1}	3	4	7	4	8					116
10	(Luxembourg) Pit Venanzi					11	9	15	8	7	7	9	9	8	9	78
11	(Germany) Bennet Ehrl	11	11	10	10	12	11	18†	9	10	16†	12	11	9	14	75
12	(Czech Republic) Filip Bartoš	7	6	9	8							10	10	10	8	70
13	(Germany) Finn Mache											6	3	3	6	66
14	(Germany) Sean Terre	15	12	8	6	9	5	8								59
15	(Germany) Theo Wieder	12	13	13	13	14	12	16	12	11	9	13	12	13	16	59
16	(Austria) Andreas Kapfinger	13	16	14	15	15	16	13	13	14	12	15	16	17	18	32
17	(Liechtenstein) Linda Frey	Ret	18	Ret	17	16	17	14	15	12	14	16	14	11	13	28
18	(Sweden) Vera Jurland	16†	15	15	16	17	14	12	14	15	13	Ret	17†	15	15	27
19	(Norway) Olav Vaa					7	10	9								25
20	(Germany) Sophie Hofmann	10	10	12	11											25
21	(Netherlands) Bente Boer											14	13	12	12	17
22	(Germany) Viviann Ehrl	Ret	17	16	18	18	18	17	16	Ret	15	17	Ret	18	17	4
Guest drivers ineligible for points
–	(Netherlands) Misha Charoudin								10	13	11					–
Pos.	Driver	OSC (Germany)				NOR (Germany)			NÜR (Germany)			SAC (Germany)				Points

Colour	Result
Gold	Winner
Silver	Second place
Bronze	Third place
Green	Points classification
Blue	Non-points classification
Blue	Non-classified finish (NC)
Purple	Retired, not classified (Ret)
Red	Did not qualify (DNQ)
Red	Did not pre-qualify (DNPQ)
Black	Disqualified (DSQ)
White	Did not start (DNS)
White	Withdrew (WD)
White	Race cancelled (C)
Blank	Did not practice (DNP)
Blank	Did not arrive (DNA)
Blank	Excluded (EX)

**Bold** – Pole

Italics – Fastest Lap

† — Did not finish, but classified

^{1} – 4 points for Pole

^{2} – 2 points for P2

^{3} – 1 point for P3
