= 2025 Prototype Winter Series =

Sports car racing tournament season

- Organizer: Gedlich Racing
- Discipline: Sports car racing
- Number of races: 8

Champions
- Prototype Winter Series - Driver: (United States) Danny Soufi
- Prototype Winter Series - Team: (Austria) Konrad Motorsport

Prototype Winter Series
- ← 2024 2026 →

2025 Prototype Winter Series was the second season of the Prototype Winter Series, sports car racing series organized by Gedlich Racing and licensed by Automobile Club de l'Ouest (ACO).

== Race calendar ==
Round		Circuit	Date	Supporting	Map of circuit locations
1	R1	(Portugal) Circuito do Estoril, Estoril	16–19 January	GT Winter Series; GT4 Winter Series	2025 Prototype Winter Series is located in Iberia
1	R2	(Portugal) Circuito do Estoril, Estoril	16–19 January	GT Winter Series; GT4 Winter Series	2025 Prototype Winter Series is located in Iberia
2	R1	(Portugal) Algarve International Circuit, Portimão	23–26 January	GT Winter Series; GT4 Winter Series	2025 Prototype Winter Series is located in Iberia
2	R2	(Portugal) Algarve International Circuit, Portimão	23–26 January	GT Winter Series; GT4 Winter Series	2025 Prototype Winter Series is located in Iberia
3	R1	(Spain) MotorLand Aragón, Alcañiz	27 February—2 March	GT Winter Series; GT4 Winter Series; Formula Winter Series	2025 Prototype Winter Series is located in Iberia
3	R2	(Spain) MotorLand Aragón, Alcañiz	27 February—2 March	GT Winter Series; GT4 Winter Series; Formula Winter Series	2025 Prototype Winter Series is located in Iberia
4	R1	(Spain) Circuit de Barcelona-Catalunya, Montmeló	6–9 March	GT Winter Series; GT4 Winter Series; Formula Winter Series	2025 Prototype Winter Series is located in Iberia
4	R2	(Spain) Circuit de Barcelona-Catalunya, Montmeló	6–9 March	GT Winter Series; GT4 Winter Series; Formula Winter Series	2025 Prototype Winter Series is located in Iberia

== Vehicle classes ==
The 2025 Prototype Winter Series consists of two vehicle classes. These are:

- LMP3: Cars homologated according to the second generation of LMP3 cars.
- Gen 1: Cars homologated according to the first generation of LMP3 cars.

== Entry list ==
Team	Chassis	No.	Drivers	Rounds
LMP3
(Austria) Konrad Motorsport	Ligier JS P320	1	(United States) Danny Soufi	All
(Austria) Konrad Motorsport	Ligier JS P320	11	(Germany) Zino-Ferret Fahlke	4
(Luxembourg) DKR Engineering	Duqueine M30 - D08	3	(Germany) Laurents Hörr	All
(Luxembourg) DKR Engineering	Duqueine M30 - D08	3	(United States) Jon Brownson	1, 2, 4
(France) Racing Spirit of Léman	Duqueine M30 - D08	10	(Germany) Christian Gisy	2
(France) Racing Spirit of Léman	Duqueine M30 - D08	10	(Germany) Vincent Gisy	2
(Luxembourg) Racing Experience	Duqueine M30 - D08	12	(Austria) Wolfgang Payr	All
(Luxembourg) Racing Experience	Duqueine M30 - D08	12	(Denmark) Mathias Bjerre Jakobsen	All
(Denmark) High Class Racing	Ligier JS P320	20	(Denmark) Philip Lindberg	All
(Germany) KC2 Racing	Ligier JS P320	44	(Germany) Jochen Schäfer	4
(Poland) Team Virage	Ligier JS P320	51	(Colombia) Geronimo Gomez	4
(Poland) Team Virage	Ligier JS P320	51	(Spain) Daniel Nogales	4
(France) M Racing	Ligier JS P320	64	(Austria) Michael Doppelmayr	1
(France) M Racing	Ligier JS P320	64	(Germany) Pierre Kaffer	1
(Switzerland) CLX Motorsport	Ligier JS P320	87	(Switzerland) David Droux	All
(Switzerland) CLX Motorsport	Ligier JS P320	87	(Belgium) Quentin Joseph	All

== Race results ==
Bold indicates overall winner.

Round		Circuit	Pole position	LMP3 Winners
1	R1	(Portugal) Circuito do Estoril	(Austria) No. 1 Konrad Motorsport	(Austria) No. 1 Konrad Motorsport
1	R1	(Portugal) Circuito do Estoril	(United States) Danny Soufi	(United States) Danny Soufi
1	R2	(Portugal) Circuito do Estoril	(Austria) No. 1 Konrad Motorsport	(Austria) No. 1 Konrad Motorsport
1	R2	(Portugal) Circuito do Estoril	(United States) Danny Soufi	(United States) Danny Soufi
2	R1	(Portugal) Algarve International Circuit	(Austria) No. 1 Konrad Motorsport	(Austria) No. 1 Konrad Motorsport
2	R1	(Portugal) Algarve International Circuit	(United States) Danny Soufi	(United States) Danny Soufi
2	R2	(Portugal) Algarve International Circuit	(Luxembourg) No. 3 DKR Engineering	(Austria) No. 1 Konrad Motorsport
2	R2	(Portugal) Algarve International Circuit	(Germany) Laurents Hörr (United States) Jon Brownson	(United States) Danny Soufi
3	R1	(Spain) MotorLand Aragón	(Austria) No. 1 Konrad Motorsport	(Austria) No. 1 Konrad Motorsport
3	R1	(Spain) MotorLand Aragón	(United States) Danny Soufi	(United States) Danny Soufi
3	R2	(Spain) MotorLand Aragón	(Switzerland) No. 87 CLX Motorsport	(Luxembourg) No. 3 DKR Engineering
3	R2	(Spain) MotorLand Aragón	(Belgium) Quentin Joseph (Switzerland) David Droux	(Germany) Laurents Hörr
4	R1	(Spain) Circuit de Barcelona-Catalunya	(Austria) No. 1 Konrad Motorsport	(Austria) No. 1 Konrad Motorsport
4	R1	(Spain) Circuit de Barcelona-Catalunya	(United States) Danny Soufi	(United States) Danny Soufi
4	R2	(Spain) Circuit de Barcelona-Catalunya	(Luxembourg) No. 12 Racing Experience	(Austria) No. 1 Konrad Motorsport
4	R2	(Spain) Circuit de Barcelona-Catalunya	(Denmark) Mathias Bjerre Jakobsen	(United States) Danny Soufi

== Championship standings ==
=== Points system ===
Position	1st	2nd	3rd	4th	5th	6th	7th	8th	9th	10th
Points	25	18	15	12	10	8	6	4	2	1

=== Standings ===
Pos.	Driver	Team	EST (Portugal)		POR (Portugal)		ARA (Spain)		CAT (Spain)		Points
Pos.	Driver	Team	RC1	RC2	RC1	RC2	RC1	RC2	RC1	RC2	Points
1	(United States) Danny Soufi	(Austria) Konrad Motorsport	1	1	1	1	1	2	1	1	193
2	(Belgium) Quentin Joseph (Switzerland) David Droux	(Switzerland) CLX Motorsport	3	2	3	2	2	3	3	4	126
3	(Germany) Laurents Hörr	(Luxembourg) DKR Engineering	2	5	2	5	4	1	2	6	119
4	(United States) Jon Brownson	(Luxembourg) DKR Engineering	2	5	2	5	4	WD	2	6	94
5	(Denmark) Philip Lindberg	(Denmark) High Class Racing	4	3	4	Ret	5	4	7	3	82
6	(Austria) Wolfgang Payr (Denmark) Mathias Bjerre Jakobsen	(Luxembourg) Racing Experience	5	4	Ret	4	3	5	6	8	71
7	(Germany) Zino-Ferret Fahlke	(Austria) Konrad Motorsport							5	2	28
8	(Germany) Christian Gisy (Germany) Vincent Gisy	(France) Racing Spirit of Léman			5	3					25
9	(Colombia) Geronimo Gomez (Spain) Daniel Nogales	(Poland) Team Virage							4	5	22
10	(Austria) Michael Doppelmayr (Germany) Pierre Kaffer	(France) M Racing	6	6							16
11	(Germany) Jochen Schäfer	(Germany) KC2 Racing							8	7	10
Pos.	Driver	Team	EST (Portugal)		POR (Portugal)		ARA (Spain)		CAT (Spain)		Points
