= Danny Soufi =

American racing driver (born 2003)

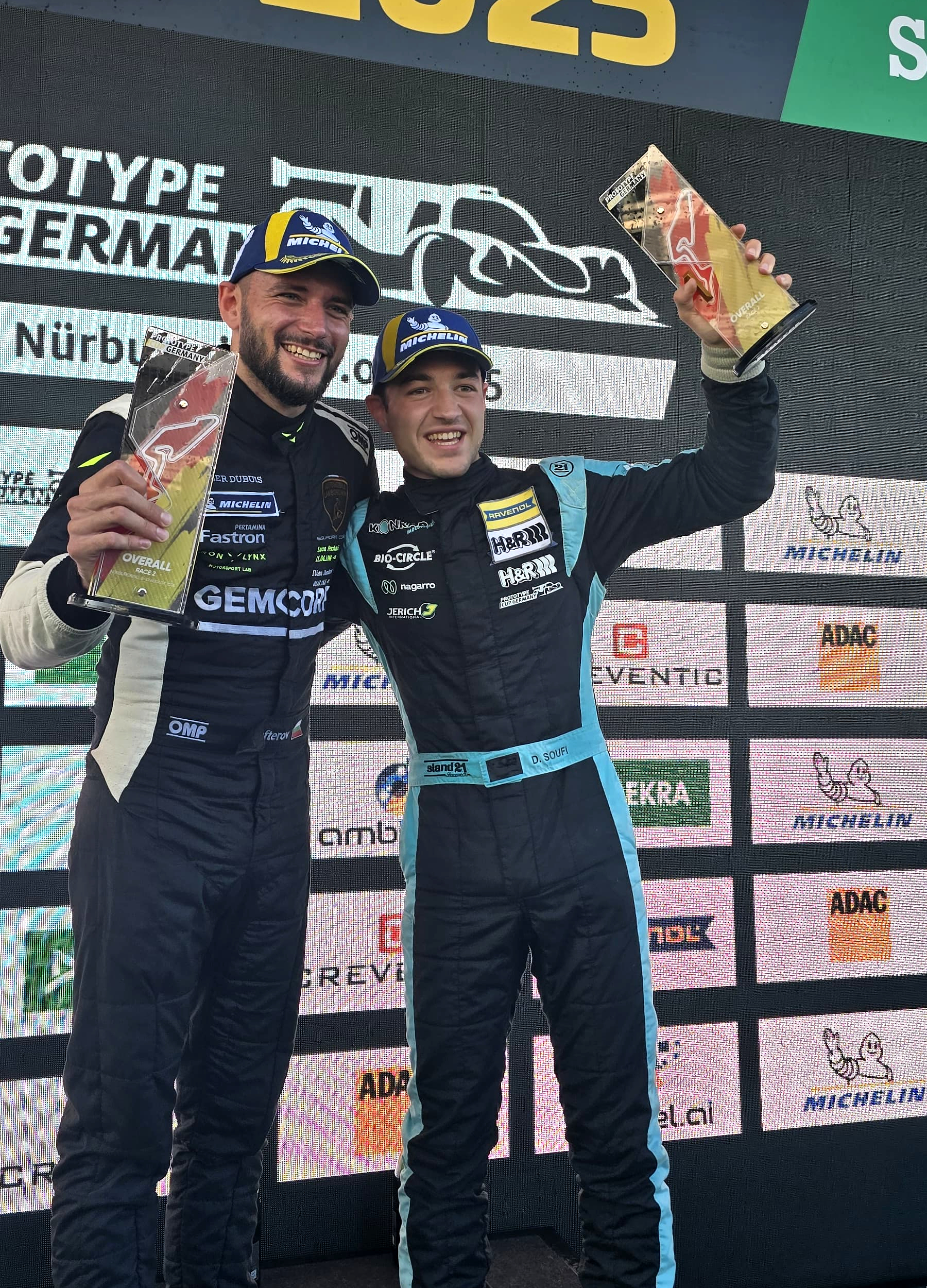
- Soufi (right) with 2025 teammate Pavel Lefterov
- Nationality: (United States) American
- Born: 16 July 2003 (age 23) Fairfax, Virginia, United States

2026 IMSA VP Racing SportsCar Challenge career
- Debut season: 2026
- Current team: Gebhardt Motorsport
- Categorisation: FIA Silver
- Car number: 11
- Starts: 0
- Wins: 0
- Poles: 0
- Fastest laps: 0

Previous series
- 2022 - 2025: Prototype Cup Germany

Championship titles
- 2024 2025: Prototype Cup Germany Junior Champion; Prototype Cup Germany Drivers' Champion

Danny Soufi (born 16 July 2003) is an American racing driver currently competing in the Prototype Cup Germany with Konrad Motorsport. In 2025, he became the Prototype Cup Germany Overall Champion together with teammate Pavel Lefterov.

== Early career ==
Soufi began his racing career at the age of ten, driving a Mazda Miata at Harris Hill Raceway (H2R) in San Marcos, Texas. Starting in 2014, he quickly developed his skills in the competitive Spec Miata series, a popular class known for its close and exciting racing.

By 2016, Soufi had secured his first major title, winning the H2R Miata Challenge Championship. Building on this success, his breakthrough year came in 2017, when he dominated the Texas Region, winning multiple titles as a rookie. These accolades included the NASA Spec Miata Championship and the Teen Mazda Challenge Championship for the Texas Region, alongside being named NASA Texas Rookie of the Year and NASA Texas Driver of the Year.

In 2019, Soufi reclaimed the H2R Miata Challenge Championship, further solidifying his reputation as a rising star in the Texas racing community.

In addition to his success in sprint races, Soufi has also competed in several endurance races, notably in the ChumpCar World Series. During these events, he consistently set the fastest laps for his teams at prestigious tracks such as the Circuit of the Americas and Harris Hill Raceway, demonstrating his versatility and speed in long-distance racing formats.

In 2020 and 2021, Soufi transitioned to drifting, where he once again found success, showcasing his versatility across different motorsport disciplines.

== Sportscar career ==
=== LMP3 ===
==== 2022 ====
In 2022, Soufi decided to take his racing career in a new direction by moving to Europe to compete in more diverse and challenging motorsport categories. He connected with team principal Franz Konrad during the Prototype Cup Germany race weekend at the Nürburgring. After impressing Konrad in a test, Soufi quickly earned a spot driving for Konrad Motorsport in the Prototype Cup Germany, making his debut at the Hockenheim race shortly thereafter.

==== 2023 ====
After two guest starts in the 2022 Prototype Cup Germany, at the final rounds at Lausitzring and Hockenheimring, 2023 marked Soufi's first full season in the LMP3 class, competing again in the Prototype Cup Germany. The 2023 season served as a developmental year for Soufi, where he shared driving duties in a Ginetta G61-LT-P3 with five different co-drivers across six race weekends. Among his co-drivers were notable racers such as Axcil Jefferies and Tim Zimmermann, whose experience provided valuable learning opportunities for the young driver.

==== 2024 ====
In 2024, Konrad Motorsport switched to the Ligier JS P320 chassis. Soufi competed in the Prototype Winter Series, where he claimed his first title in sportscars. He became the inaugural series champion, after winning three out of seven races. For the 2024 Prototype Cup season, Soufi teamed up with experienced LMP3 competitor Torsten Kratz, and the duo enjoyed considerable success, finishing as vice champions nine points behind Gebhardt Motorsport drivers Markus Pommer and Valentino Catalano.

==== 2025 ====
Soufi successfully defended his Prototype Winter Series title in 2025, becoming a two-time champion with seven wins in eight races. He opened the season with double victories at Estoril and Portimão before continuing his dominance at Aragón, where he won Race 1 but finished second in Race 2 behind Laurents Hörr. Soufi then secured back-to-back wins in the final rounds, sealing the championship with a commanding points lead.

=== GT3 ===
==== 2023 ====
In 2023, Soufi made his GT3 debut with Konrad Motorsport at the ADAC 24h Qualifying Race at the Nürburgring, driving a Lamborghini Huracán GT3. Prior to this, he participated in various rounds of the Nürburgring Langstrecken Serie with QTQ Race Performance to secure his Nordschleife permit, which allowed him to compete in endurance races at the famed circuit.

During the 2023 NLS season, Soufi shared the car with experienced drivers Luca Ludwig, Axcil Jefferies, and Yelmer Buurman. For the 2023 Nürburgring 24h Race, he once again teamed up with Yelmer Buurman and Axcil Jefferies, and they were joined by Pavel Lefterov. During the second qualifying session for the 24h race, a major incident occurred when Pavel Lefterov collided with a Porsche Cayman driven by Karl Heinz Meyer while coming onto Döttinger Höhe, resulting in significant damage to the car. This incident necessitated a major rebuild of the vehicle before the main race. In the main event, the team was forced to retire early in the morning due to a mechanical issue.

==== 2024 ====
In 2024, Soufi returned to compete in both the NLS and the ADAC 24h Race at the Nürburgring. For the Qualifying Race, he was joined by Thierry Vermeulen and Maximilian Paul. In the 24h race, which got cut short due to heavy fog, he teamed up with Maximilian Paul, Torsten Kratz, and Colin Caresani, finishing 15th overall and achieving third place in the Pro-Am class.

==== 2025 ====
In 2025, Danny Soufi participated in the GT Winter Series with Konrad Motorsport, sharing the Lamborghini Huracán GT3 EVO I with German driver Carrie Schreiner. Schreiner competed in the sprint races, while Soufi joined her for the endurance events.

Throughout the season, the duo consistently performed well, securing third place in the GT3 class standings. Their collaboration culminated in a notable performance during the final race at Circuit de Barcelona-Catalunya, where they achieved a third-place overall finish. In this race, Soufi demonstrated exceptional defensive driving by holding off DTM driver Luca Engstler, securing their podium position.

== Racing record ==
=== Racing career summary ===
Season	Series	Team	Races	Wins	Poles	F/Laps	Podiums	Points	Position
2019	TC America Series - TCA	X-Factor Racing	2	0	0	0	0	8	18th
2022	Prototype Cup Germany	Konrad Motorsport	4	0	0	0	0	0	NC†
2023	Prototype Cup Germany	Konrad Motorsport	12	0	0	0	0	59	15th
2023	Ultimate Cup Series - Proto P3	Konrad Motorsport	1	0	0	0	0	11	32
2023	24 Hours of Nürburgring - SP9	Konrad Motorsport	1	0	0	0	0	N/A	DNF
2023	Nürburgring Langstrecken-Serie - V5	QTQ Race Performance	2	1	0	0	1	0	NC†
2024	Prototype Cup Germany	Konrad Motorsport	12	2	0	0	7	197	**2nd**
2024	Prototype Winter Series - Class 3	Konrad Motorsport	7	3	1	1	4	44.295	**1st**
2024	Nürburgring Langstrecken-Serie - SP9 Pro	Konrad Motorsport	2	0	0	0	0	0	-
2024	Nürburgring Langstrecken-Serie - SP9 Pro-Am	Konrad Motorsport	2	0	0	0	1	2	32nd
2024	24 Hours of Nürburgring - SP9 Pro-Am	Konrad Motorsport	1	0	0	0	1	N/A	**3rd**
2025	Prototype Winter Series	Konrad Motorsport	8	7	5	3	8	193	**1st**
2025	GT Winter Series - GT3	Konrad Motorsport	3	1	0	0	2	135	**3rd**
2025	Prototype Cup Germany	Konrad Motorsport	12	6	1	1	9	226	**1st**
2025	Nürburgring Langstrecken-Serie - SP9	Konrad Motorsport	1	0	0	0	0	0	NC†
2025	24 Hours of Nürburgring - SP9	Konrad Motorsport	1	0	0	0	0	N/A	8th
2025	24 Hours of Nürburgring - SP9 Pro-Am	Konrad Motorsport	1	0	0	0	1	N/A	**3rd**
2025	Le Mans Cup - LMP3	Gebhardt Motorsport	1	0	0	0	0	0*	NC*
2026	IMSA VP Racing SportsCar Challenge - LMP3	Gebhardt Motorsport	14	0	0	0	6	3910	**2nd**
2026	Prototype Cup Europe	German Motor Sports Team	6	2	3	2	5	123	4th
2026–27	Asian Le Mans Cup – LMP3 Pro	GMS							

† As Soufi was a guest driver, he was ineligible to score points.

* Season still in progress.

=== Complete Prototype Cup Germany results ===
(key) (Races in bold indicate pole position) (Races in italics indicate fastest lap)

Year	Team	Car	Engine	1	2	3	4	5	6	7	8	9	10	11	12	13	14	DC	Points
2022	Konrad Motorsport	Ginetta G61-LT-P3	Nissan VK56DE 5.6L V8	SPA; 1	SPA; 2	NÜR 1	NÜR 2	LAU; 1; 9	LAU; 2; 7	HOC; 1 Ret	HOC; 2; 10							NC†	0
2023	Konrad Motorsport	Ginetta G61-LT-P3	Nissan VK56DE 5.6 L V8	HOC; 1 Ret	HOC; 2; 13	OSC; 1; 8	OSC; 2; 6	ZAN; 1; 13†	ZAN; 2 DNS	NOR; 1; 6	NOR; 2 Ret	ASS; 1; 10	ASS; 2 Ret	NÜR; 1; 10	NÜR; 2; 9			15th	59
2024	Konrad Motorsport	Ligier JS P320	Nissan VK56DE 5.6 L V8	SPA; 1 C	SPA; 2 C	LAU; 1; 2	LAU; 2; 1	LAU; 3; 1	ZAN; 1; 2	ZAN; 2; 3	HOC; 1; 3	HOC; 2; 8	HOC; 3; 2	NÜR; 1; 6	NÜR; 2; 8	SAC; 1; 6	SAC; 2; 4	2nd	197
2025	Konrad Motorsport	Ligier JS P320	Nissan VK56DE 5.6 L V8	SPA; 1; 1	SPA; 2; 3	HOC; 1; 2	HOC; 2 DSQ	LAU; 1; 1	LAU; 2; 1	NOR; 1; 2	NOR; 2; 1	NÜR; 1; 1	NÜR; 2; 1	RBR; 1; 9	RBR; 2; 4			1st	226

† As Soufi was a guest driver, he was ineligible to score points.

=== Complete Prototype Winter Series results ===
(key) (Races in bold indicate pole position) (Races in italics indicate fastest lap)

Year	Team	Car	Engine	1	2	3	4	5	6	7	8	DC	Points
2024	Konrad Motorsport	Ligier JS P320	Nissan VK56DE 5.6 L V8	EST; 1; 7	EST; 2; 1	POR; 1; 5	POR; 2; 4	**ARA**; **1**; 1	ARA; 2; 1	BAR; 1 C	BAR; 2; 2	1st	44.295
2025	Konrad Motorsport	Ligier JS P320	Nissan VK56DE 5.6 L V8	**EST**; **1**; 1	**EST**; **2**; 1	**POR**; **1**; 1	POR; 2; 1	**ARA**; **1**; 1	ARA; 2; 2	**BAR**; **1**; 1	BAR; 2; 1	1st	193

=== Complete Le Mans Cup results ===
(key) (Races in bold indicate pole position; results in italics indicate fastest lap)

Year	Entrant	Class	Chassis	1	2	3	4	5	6	7	Rank	Points
2025	Gebhardt Motorsport	LMP3	Duqueine D09	CAT	LEC	LMS; 1	LMS; 2	SPA; Ret	SIL	ALG	NC*	0*

^{*} Season still in progress.
