= Pavel Lefterov =

Bulgarian Racing Driver (born 1997)

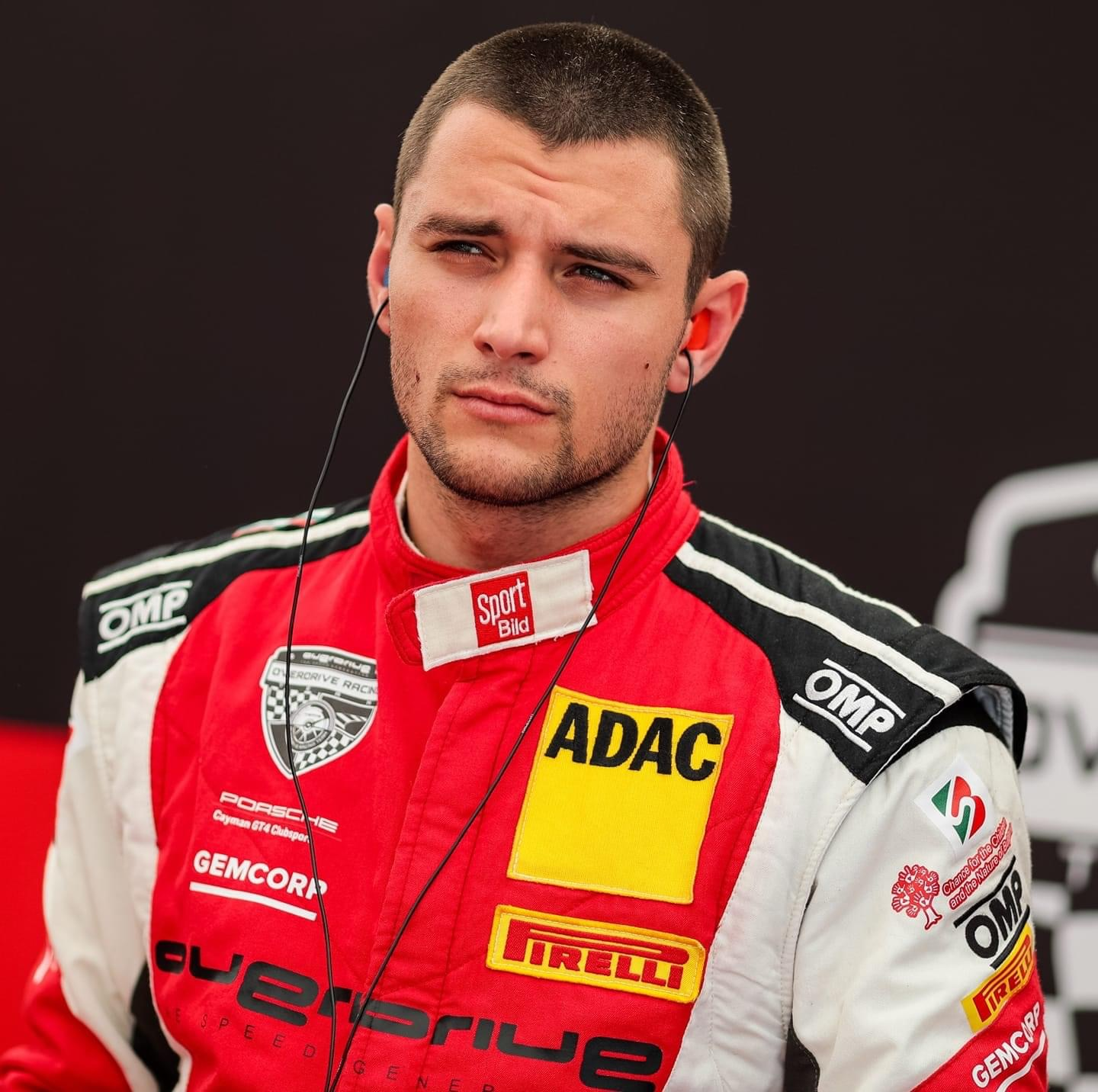
- Lefterov in 2023
- Nationality: (Bulgaria) Bulgarian
- Born: 12 November 1997 (age 28) Varna, Bulgaria

Prototype Cup Germany career
- Debut season: 2025
- Current team: Konrad Motorsport
- Categorisation: FIA Silver
- Car number: 2
- Co-driver: Danny Soufi
- Starts: 8
- Wins: 4
- Podiums: 6
- Poles: 1
- Fastest laps: 0

Previous series
- 2007–14 2015: Karting; GT4 European Series

Pavel Lefterov (Bulgarian: Павел Лефтеров; born 12 November 1997) is a Bulgarian racing driver who last raced for Konrad Motorsport in Prototype Cup Germany and the Nürburgring 24 Hours.

== Career ==
=== Karting ===
Lefterov began his sporting career at the age of nine as a kart pilot at the "Bulauto Racing" Automobile Sports Club in the "Mini BG" class. For the following eight years, he won nine titles, including six Republican, two European and one World, in various classes. At the age of 16, he won the Bulgarian Republican Men's Championship, Class KZ2.

=== GT4 European Series ===
In 2015, Lefterov joined the GT4 European Series with Bulavto Racing team in Lotus Evora as the youngest ever driver in the series. Lefterov finished on his class podium in his first ever car race. He got his first overall win on Circuit de Spa-Francorchamps by winning both races. In the following races on Nürburgring and Misano World Circuit Marco Simoncelli, he finished both first races second, and won the second races. In 2016, following the success in his debut season in GT4, Lefterov decided to join Audi Sport TT Cup for the following season. In 2021, he continued racing in the championship with the Bulgarian racing team Overdrive Racing in a Porsche 718 Cayman GT4 RS CS.

== Racing record ==
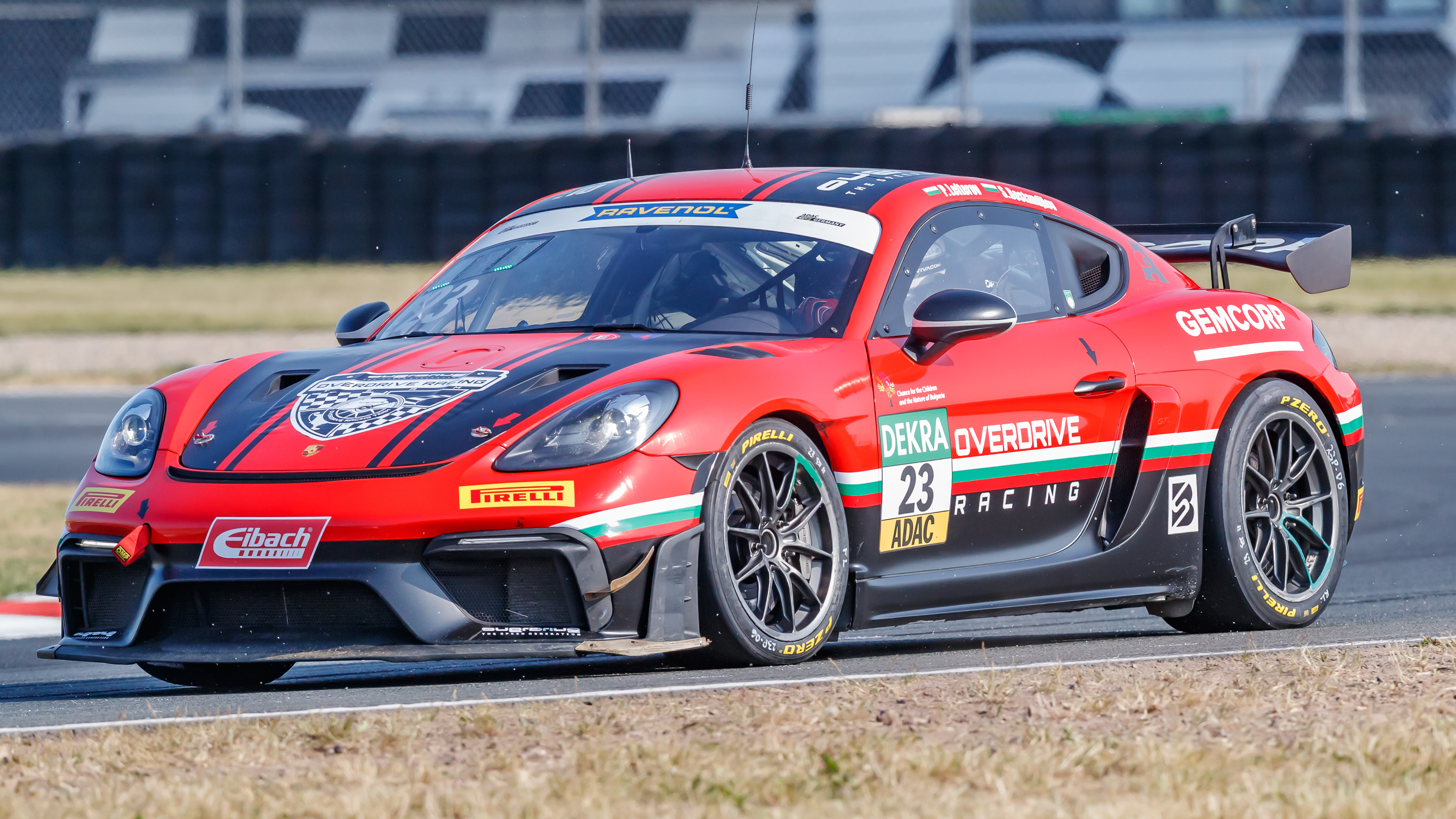
Lefterov competing in the 2023 ADAC GT4 Germany Oschersleben round.

=== Career summary ===
| Season | Series | Team | Races | Wins | Poles | F.Laps | Podiums | Points | Position |
|---|---|---|---|---|---|---|---|---|---|
| 2015 | GT4 European Series - Am | ASC Bulavto Racing | 10 | 4 | 2 | 5 | 8 | 189 | **2nd** |
| 2016 | Audi Sport TT Cup | N/A | 9 | 0 | 0 | 0 | 0 | 39 | 16th |
| 2016 | Deutscher Tourenwagen Cup - Production 2.0 | Konrad Motorsport | 10 | 6 | 6 | 6 | 10 | 104 | **1st** |
| 2016 | 24H Series - SP3 | Nova Race | | | | | | | |
| 2017 | GT4 European Series Northern Cup - Silver | RN Vision STS | 12 | 0 | 1 | 1 | 2 | 70 | 8th |
| 2018 | Lamborghini Super Trofeo Europe - Pro-Am | Leipert Motorsport | 8 | 1 | 0 | 0 | 2 | 47 | 7th |
| 2018 | Lamborghini Super Trofeo Middle East - Pro-Am | Leipert Motorsport | 2 | 0 | 0 | 0 | 2 | 2 | 8th |
| 2018 | 24H GT Series - SPX | Leipert Motorsport | 1 | 0 | 0 | 0 | 1 | 0 | NC† |
| 2019 | 24 Hours of Nürburgring - SP8 | Giti Tire Motorsport by RaceIng | 1 | 1 | 0 | 1 | 1 | N/A | **1st** |
| 2021 | ADAC GT4 Germany | Overdrive Racing | 10 | 0 | 0 | 1 | 2 | 98 | 6th |
| 2022 | ADAC GT4 Germany | Overdrive Racing | 12 | 0 | 0 | 0 | 0 | 60 | 18th |
| 2023 | ADAC GT4 Germany | Overdrive Racing | 12 | 0 | 0 | 1 | 0 | 30 | 21st |
| 2023 | GT4 European Series - Silver | Overdrive Racing | 12 | 0 | 0 | 0 | 0 | 9 | 33rd |
| 2023 | GT Winter Series | Overdrive Racing Team | ? | ? | ? | ? | ? | 42.75 | 16th |
| 2023 | 24 Hours of Nürburgring - SP9 | Konrad Motorsport | 1 | 0 | 0 | 0 | 0 | N/A | DNF |
| 2024 | Lamborghini Super Trofeo Europe | Iron Lynx | | | | | | | |
| 2024 | Italian GT Sprint Championship - GT3 | Iron Lynx | 2 | 0 | 0 | 0 | 0 | 10 | NC‡ |
| 2025 | Prototype Cup Germany | Konrad Motorsport | 12 | 6 | 1 | 1 | 9 | 226 | **1st** |
| 2025 | 24 Hours of Nürburgring - SP9 | Konrad Motorsport | 1 | 0 | 0 | 0 | 0 | N/A | 8th |
| 2025 | 24 Hours of Nürburgring - SP9 Pro-Am | Konrad Motorsport | 1 | 0 | 0 | 0 | 1 | N/A | **3rd** |
| 2026 | Nürburgring Langstrecken-Serie - SP9 | FK Performance Motorsport | 1 | 0 | 0 | 0 | 0 | 0 | NC† |
| 2026 | Nürburgring Langstrecken-Serie - SP9 | Konrad Motorsport | 2 | 0 | 0 | 0 | 0 | 0 | NC† |
| 2026 | 24 Hours of Nürburgring - SP9 | Konrad Motorsport | 1 | 0 | 0 | 0 | 0 | N/A | DNF |
| 2026 | ADAC GT Masters | razoon – more than racing | 12 | 0 | 1 | 0 | 2 | 129 | 5th |
| 2026 | Prototype Cup Europe | Purple Sector | 2 | 0 | 0 | 0 | 0 | 15 | 15th |
| 2026 | Nürburgring Langstrecken-Serie - SP10 | FK Performance Motorsport | 1 | 0 | 0 | 0 | 0 | 0 | NC† |

† Guest driver ineligible to score points.
‡ Not eligible due to championship rules.

- Season still in progress

=== Complete GT4 European Series results ===
(key) (Races in bold indicate pole position) (Races in italics indicate fastest lap)

| Year | Entrant | Car | 1 | 2 | 3 | 4 | 5 | 6 | 7 | 8 | 9 | 10 | 11 | 12 | Pos | Points |
|---|---|---|---|---|---|---|---|---|---|---|---|---|---|---|---|---|
| 2015 | Bulavto Racing | Lotus Evora GT4 | CPA; 1; 2 | CPA; 2; 4 | CPZ; 1; 9 | CPZ; 2; 5 | RBR; 1; 3 | RBR; 2 Ret | SPA; 1; 1 | **SPA**; **2**; 1 | NÜR; 1; 2 | NÜR; 2; 1 | MIS; 1; 2 | **MIS**; **2**; 1 | 2nd | 208 |

=== Complete ADAC GT Masters results ===
(key) (Races in bold indicate pole position) (Races in italics indicate fastest lap)

| Year | Team | Car | 1 | 2 | 3 | 4 | 5 | 6 | 7 | 8 | 9 | 10 | 11 | 12 | DC | Points |
|---|---|---|---|---|---|---|---|---|---|---|---|---|---|---|---|---|
| 2026 | razoon – more than racing | Porsche 911 GT3 R (992) | RBR; 1; 9 | **RBR**; **2**; 2^{1} | ZAN; 1; 7 | ZAN; 2; 4 | LAU; 1; 6 | LAU; 2; 4 | NÜR; 1; 10 | NÜR; 2; 11 | SAL; 1 Ret | SAL; 2; 8 | HOC; 1; 5^{2} | HOC; 2; 3 | 5th | 129 |
