= Prototype Cup Germany =

Sports car racing series based in Germany

- Category: Sports car racing
- Country: Germany
- Inaugural season: 2022
- Folded: 2025
- Classes: LMP3
- Constructors: (France) Ligier (France) Duqueine (United Kingdom) Ginetta
- Tyre suppliers: Michelin
- Last Drivers' champion: (United States) Danny Soufi (Bulgaria) Pavel Lefterov
- Last Teams' champion: (Austria) Konrad Motorsport
- Official website: Prototype Cup Germany

The Prototype Cup Germany was a sports car racing series based in Germany, organized by ADAC and Creventic between 2022 and 2025.

== History ==
The inaugural season of the Prototype Cup Germany was announced on December 22, 2021, with four race weekends confirmed at Spa-Francorchamps, Nürburgring, Lausitzring and Hockenheimring. The series folded after the 2025 season, after the organizers could not reach an agreement with ACO about the continuation of the V8-powered cars.

== Format ==
The race weekend consisted of two, 55-minute sprint races with a mandatory pit stop.

== Classes ==
The series was open to LMP3 prototypes with CN cars also eligible to enter, running on Michelin tires.

== Champions ==
=== Drivers ===
Year	Overall	Trophy	Junior
2022	(Turkey) Berkay Besler (Germany) Marvin Dienst	(Germany) Matthias Lüthen	(Germany) Donar Munding
2023	(Luxembourg) Gary Hauser (Germany) Markus Pommer	(Netherlands) Mark van der Snel	(Netherlands) Max van der Snel
2024	(Germany) Valentino Catalano (Germany) Markus Pommer	(Estonia) Antti Rammo	(United States) Danny Soufi
2025	(Bulgaria) Pavel Lefterov (United States) Danny Soufi	(Germany) Thomas Ambiel	(Poland) Maksymilian Angelard (Germany) Mattis Pluschkell

=== Teams ===
Year	Overall
2023	(Luxembourg) Racing Experience
2024	(Germany) Gebhardt Motorsport
2025	(Austria) Konrad Motorsport

== Circuits ==
- (Belgium) Circuit de Spa-Francorchamps (2022, 2024–2025)
- (Germany) Nürburgring (2022–2025)
- (Germany) Lausitzring (2022, 2024–2025)
- (Germany) Hockenheimring (2022–2025)
- (Germany) Motorsport Arena Oschersleben (2023)
- (Netherlands) Circuit Zandvoort (2023–2024)
- (Germany) Norisring (2023, 2025)
- (Netherlands) TT Circuit Assen (2023)
- (Germany) Sachsenring (2024)
- (Austria) Red Bull Ring (2025)
