= Duqueine D09 =

French sports car prototype

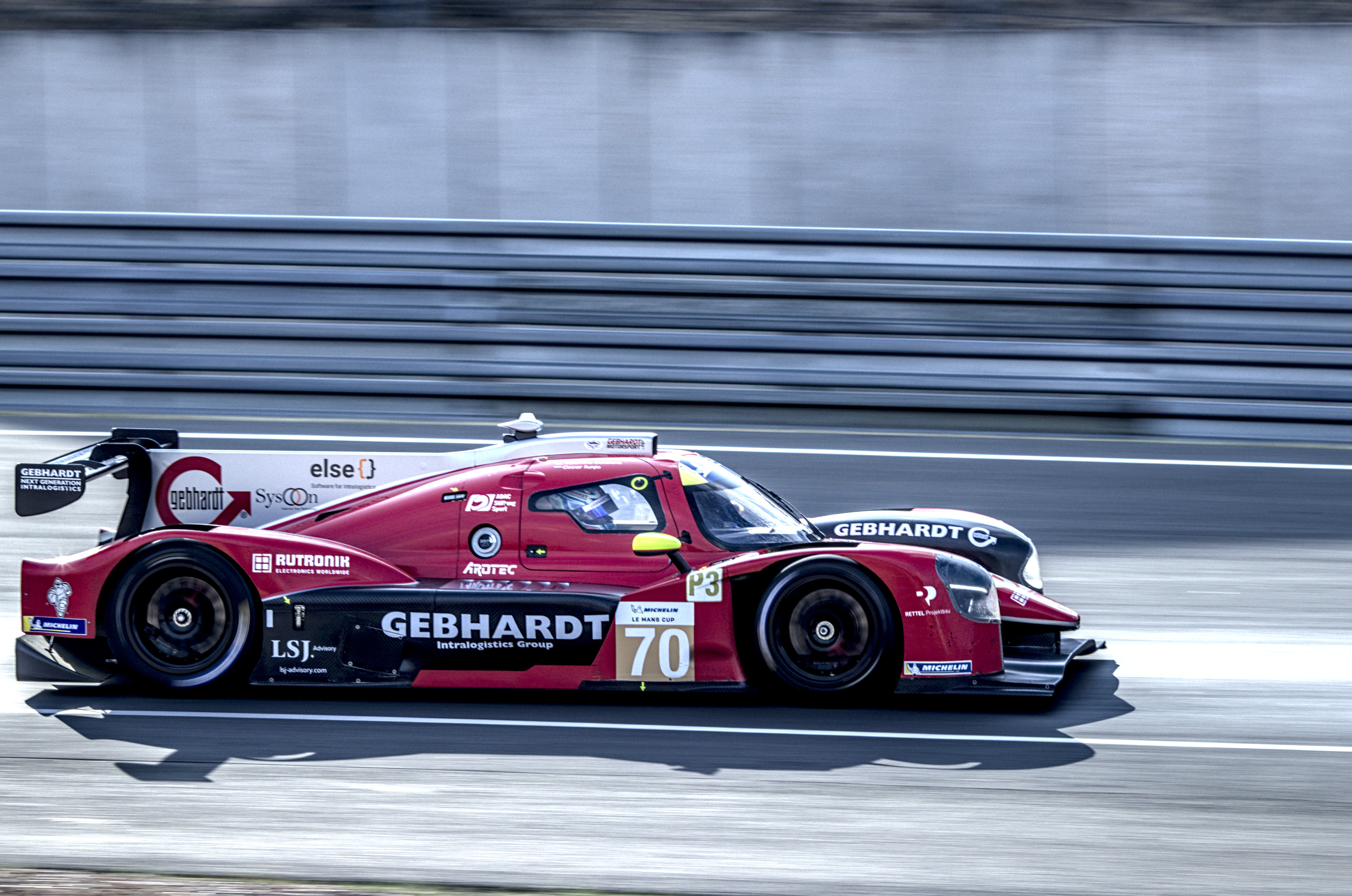
- The No. 70 D09 car of Gebhardt Motorsport during the 2025 Road to Le Mans.
- Category: LMP3
- Constructor: Duqueine Engineering
- Designer: Loïc Quintavalla
- Predecessor: Duqueine D08

Technical specifications
- Chassis: Carbon Monocoque
- Engine: Toyota V35A-FTS 3,445 cc (3.4 L; 210.2 cu in) 60° V6 twin-turbocharged

Competition history
- Debut: 2025 4 Hours of Barcelona

The Duqueine D09 is a Le Mans Prototype built to ACO 2025 3rd Generation LMP3 regulations. It was designed, and built by Duqueine Engineering. The car is the successor to the Duqueine D08. The car is set to be eligible in a series of Championships worldwide, such as the European Le Mans Series and the IMSA VP Racing SportsCar Challenge.
