= Prototype Cup Europe =

Sports car racing series based in Europe

- Category: Sports car racing
- Country: Europe
- Inaugural season: 2026
- Classes: LMP3
- Constructors: (Portugal) ADESS (France) Duqueine (France) Ligier
- Tyre suppliers: Michelin
- Official website: Prototype Cup Europe

The Prototype Cup Europe is a sports car racing series based in Europe, organized by Creventic, in partnership with the Automobile Club de l'Ouest (ACO) and Michelin, starting in 2026. It replaced the ADAC's Prototype Cup Germany.

== History ==
The inaugural season of the Prototype Cup Europe was announced on 22 January 2026, with four race weekends confirmed at Spa-Francorchamps, Monza, Mugello and Nürburgring. It is the successor series to the previous Prototype Cup Germany, which utilized second-generation LMP3 cars. The champion will receive an automatic entry into the 2027 Le Mans Cup.

== Format ==
The race weekend consists of two, 55-minute, sprint races with a mandatory pit stop.

== Classes ==
The series is open to third-generation, LMP3 prototypes, running on Michelin tyres. Driver composition consists of Bronze and Silver-graded drivers competing either alone, or in a pairing. Gold-rated drivers are only allowed to team with Bronze-rated drivers.

== Circuits ==
- (Italy) Mugello Circuit (2026)
- (Germany) Nürburgring (2026)
- (Italy) Monza Circuit (2026)
- (Belgium) Circuit de Spa-Francorchamps (2026)
- (Austria) Red Bull Ring (2027)
- (France) Circuit Paul Ricard (2027)
- (Spain) Circuit de Barcelona-Catalunya (2027)
