= Gebhardt Motorsport =

(Germany) Gebhardt Motorsport
- Founded: 1975
- Founder(s): Günther Gebhardt; Fritz Gebhardt
- Base: Sinsheim, Germany
- Current series: IMSA VP Racing SportsCar Challenge; Prototype Cup Europe
- Former series: Prototype Cup Germany; World Sportscar Championship
- Website: https://gebhardtmotorsport.com/

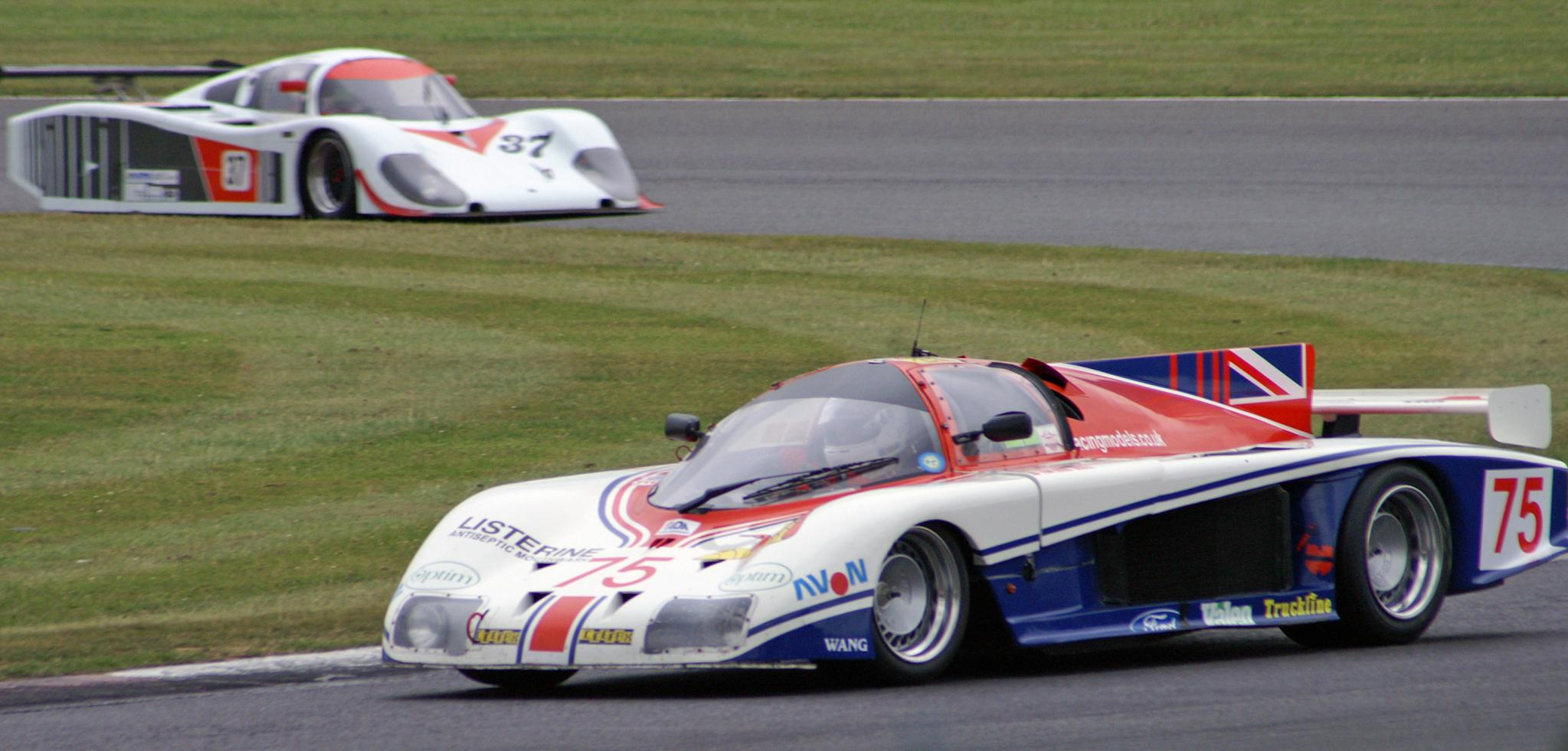
A Gebhardt JC843 at the 2009 Silverstone Classic, Northamptonshire, England, UK.

Gebhardt Motorsport is a German motor racing team and constructor founded by brothers Günther and Fritz Gebhardt. Originally the team was formed to further the open wheel racing career of Günther Gebhardt as he progressed through Formula Super Vee and Formula 3 racing a succession of March and Ralt open wheelers. Gebhardt reached Formula 2 in 1982 racing a March 812 BMW but went no further before shifting to sportscar endurance racing.

== Sportscars ==
The team first entered the Deutsche Rennsport Meisterschaft in 1983 with their own car, Gebhardt JC02 which had a two-litre Toyota engine and raced in the C Junior class with Kennerth Persson. The Gebhardt JC842 and Gebhardt JC843 followed for the 1984 season in the World Sportscar Championship and Interserie races. The JC842 was powered by a two-litre BMW M12 engine, the JC843 the ubiquitous three litre Cosworth DFV engine. Frank Jelinski led the team in competition with a number of other drivers joining him from race to race including Günther Gebhardt. As the year went on the JC842 increasingly became a women's car with Beate Nodes leading.

Jelinski continued to lead the team into 1985 with Jan Thoelke becoming a regular. Two new cars appeared, the Gebhardt GCA which was a Maurer MM83 BMW Formula 2 racing car, modified into a two-litre open cockpit sportscar for Thoelke to race in Interserie Division II. The Gebhardt JC853 followed replacing the JC843 which was sold to British team ADA Engineering.

Stanley Dickens drove with Jelinski in the JC853 more regularly in 1986 and the pair moved together to Joest Racing for 1987. In 1987 the Gebhardt JC873 appeared, powered by an Audi two litre turbocharged engine and Walter Lechner became the leading Gebhardt racer. The team stepped away from World Sportscars and concentrated on the Interserie series.

Into 1988 and the Audi turbo was abandoned in favour of the proven Cosworth DFL V8 engine. Günther Gebhardt raced more often with Hellmut Mundas leading the team. For 1989 the car was modified into the Gebhardt 88 C2 and was Audi turbo powered again with Mundas racing the car in Interserie races and Rudi Seher racing it in Supercup races.

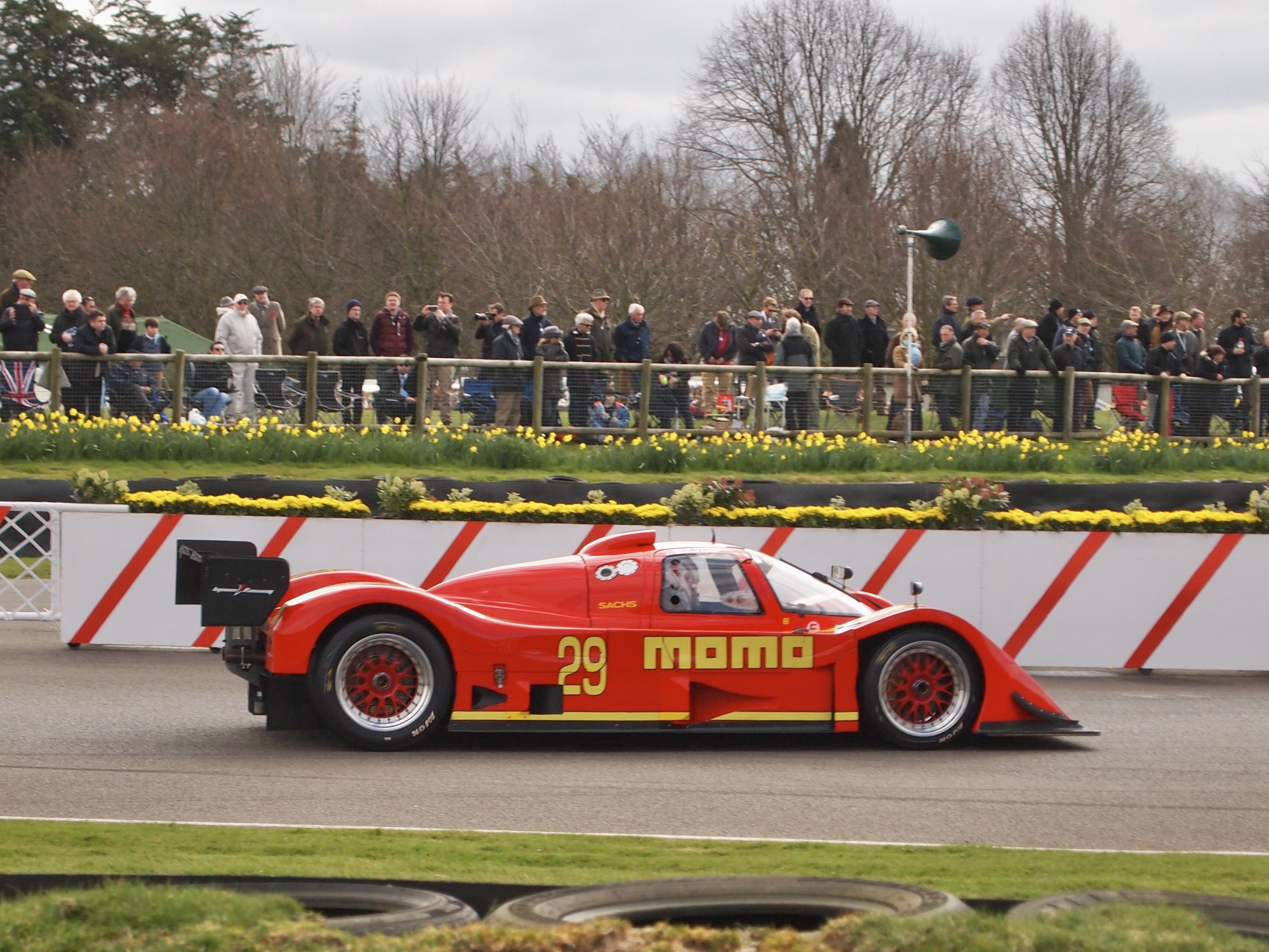
Gebhardt C91-Cosworth at the Goodwood Members Meeting, 2015

Almo Coppelli and Gianpiero Moretti started racing with the team in 1990, bringing with them the support of Momo. A final car was built, the Gebhardt C901, again with the Audi turbo. The team raced a Porsche 962C at Le Mans that year.

Changes to World Sportscar technical regulations in the early '90s, in effect penalising and banning turbocharged engines, came into effect. The C901 was rebuilt as the Gebhardt C91 with the 3.5 litre Cosworth DFR V8 engine. The naturally aspirated Sportscar World Championship soon failed as grid numbers fell.

The team returned to regular racing in 1999. The C91 was modified again into the Gebhardt G4 with Audi turbo power again but the roof was removed to race in the SR1 class of the Sports Racing World Cup. Frank Jelinski and Stanley Dickens returned to the team for the 1999 campaign. The team folded at the end of the 1999 season. Older cars continued to appear in Interserie as late as 2002.

Recently the G4 has been modified back to C91 Cosworth DFR specifications and is seen regularly in historic Group C racing.

The team most recently, as of 2022, competes in the Prototype Cup Germany series fielding a Ginetta G61-LT-P3.
