= Konrad Motorsport =

German auto racing team

(Germany) Konrad Motorsport
- Founded: 1976
- Base: Verl, Germany
- Team principal(s): Franz Konrad
- Current series: Prototype Cup Germany; Prototype Winter Series; Nürburgring Langstrecken Serie
- Former series: Interserie; WSC; BPR Global GT Series; IMSA GT Championship; American Le Mans Series; FIA GT Championship; German Formula Three Championship; Porsche Carrera Cup; Lamborghini Super Trofeo
- Teams' Championships: 2009 Porsche Supercup season 2024 Prototype Winter Series; 2025 Prototype Winter Series
- Drivers' Championships: 2009 Porsche Supercup season (Bleekemolen); 2024 Prototype Winter Series (Soufi); 2025 Prototype Winter Series (Soufi)
- Website: http://www.konradmotorsport.com/

Konrad Motorsport is an auto racing team initially from Austria, but now based in Germany. Founded by Austrian racer Franz Konrad in 1976, the team has mostly run Porsches, although they have also run Ferraris, Lamborghinis, and Saleens over their existence.

== History ==
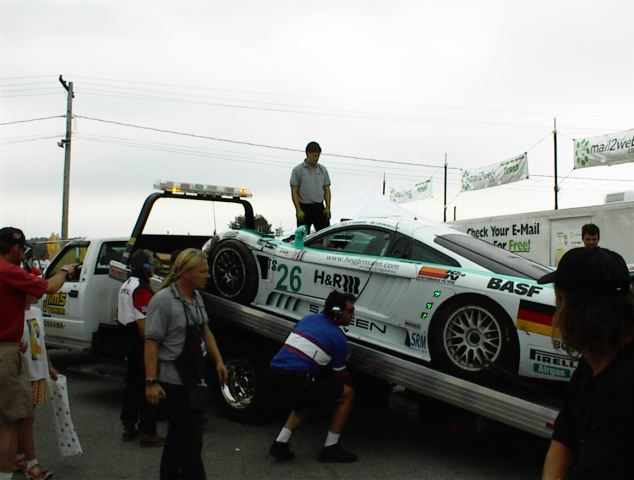
A Konrad Motorsport's Saleen S7 at the 2002 Grand Prix of Mosport

Initially competing in the Interserie championship, the team later moved to the World Sportscar Championship running Porsche 962s. In 1991, Franz Konrad designed his own Group C chassis for the World Sportscar Championship with Lamborghini backing, known as the Konrad KM-011, although the car was not successful.

The team moved to smaller championships in 1993, where they won the 24 Hours Nürburgring and Mil Milhas Brasileiras, the later of which they won again in 1995. The team eventually moved to the BPR Global GT Series competing with Porsche 911 GT2s. By 1997, the team would be involved in multiple racing series, including the FIA GT Championship, IMSA GT Championship, and the Porsche Supercup. After briefly running Lola prototypes, the team eventually switched to running Saleen S7-Rs in the American Le Mans Series and FIA GT Championship.

The team returned to running Porsche 911 GT3-RSRs in 2006, where they won the 24 Hours of Bahrain. Konrad Motorsport continues to use their Porsches in competition today.

Konrad Motorsports partnered with Dempsey Racing for the 2014 United SportsCar Championship season, fielding a Porsche 911 GT America in the GTD class.
