= Torsten Kratz =

German racing driver (born 1970)

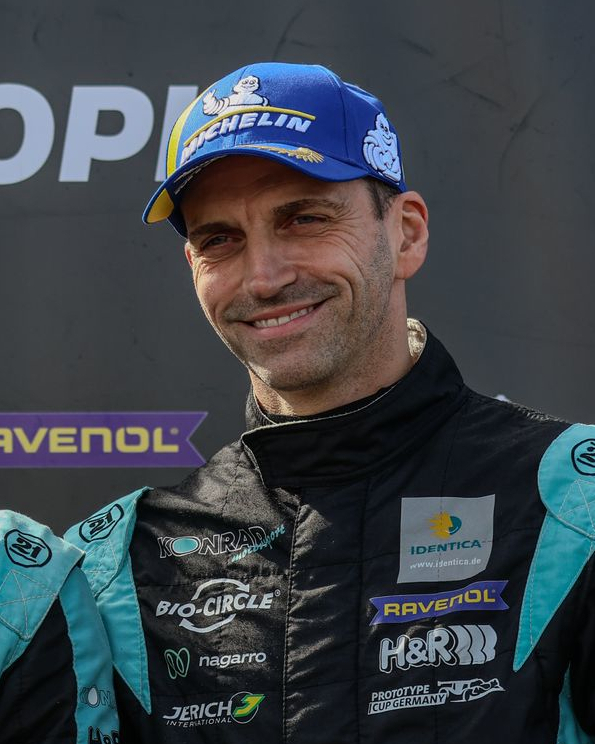
- Kratz in 2024
- Nationality: (Germany) German
- Born: 28 October 1970 (age 56) Mönchengladbach, West Germany
- Categorisation: FIA Bronze

Championship titles
- 2026: 24H Series – GT3 Am

Torsten Kratz (born 28 October 1970) is a German racing driver who last competed in the 24H Series for Hofor Racing. He is best known for his success in the LMP3 class with WTM by Rinaldi Racing.

== Career ==
Kratz made his car racing debut in 1998 at the Nürburgring, before joining the VLN Series in 2005 and later finishing runner-up in the 2007 Rundstrecken-Challenge Nürburgring standings. Racing primarily at the Nürburgring until 2021, Kratz won the 24 Hours of Nürburgring in Cup 5 class in 2015, the V4 class in 2017 and 2018, as well as the KL Cup in the latter year. During 2021, Kratz also made his debut in endurance prototypes, joining WTM Powered by Phoenix to compete in the LMP3 class of the Le Mans Cup alongside Leonard Weiss, the son of WTM owner Georg Weiss. In his first season in the series, Kratz finished third at both Spa and Algarve to end the year eighth in points.

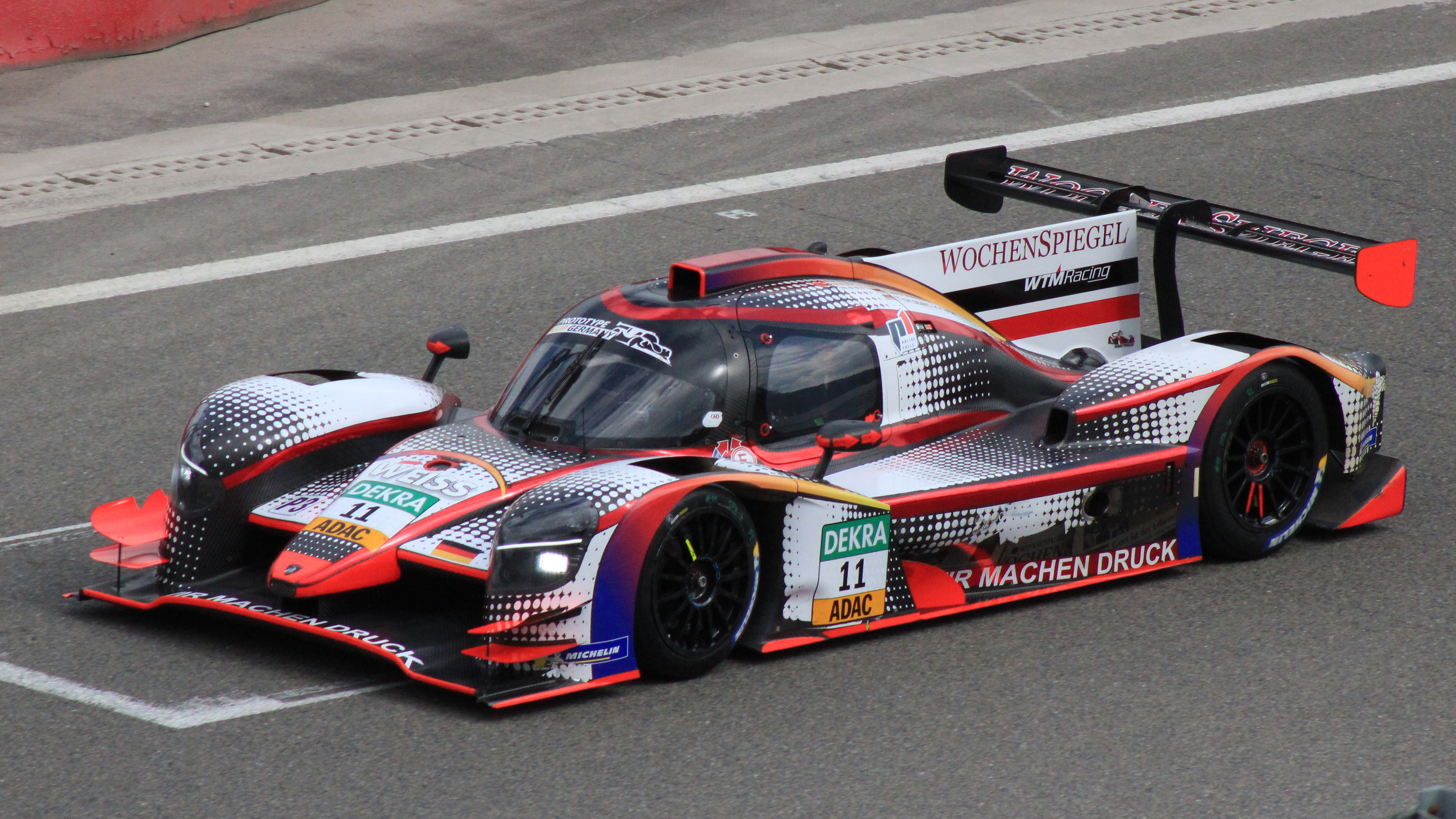
Kratz at Spa-Francorchamps during the 2022 Prototype Cup Germany.

Kratz racing for WTM by Rinaldi at the 2022 Road to Le Mans.

Kratz started off 2022 in the Asian Le Mans Series for Rinaldi Racing in the LMP3 class, taking a lone podium at Abu Dhabi to secure third in points. For the rest of the year, Kratz joined WTM Racing for a dual campaign in both the Le Mans Cup and Prototype Cup Germany. In the former, Kratz qualified on pole three times, but was only able to score a best result of fourth twice as he rounded out the year eighth in the LMP3 standings. In the latter, Kratz won both races at the Hockenheimring and finished on the podium twice at Spa to secure runner-up honors in points despite missing the Nürburgring round.

Continuing with WTM by Rinaldi Racing for 2023, Kratz raced with them for a dual campaign in the LMP3 classes of the Asian and European Le Mans Series. Qualifying on pole for all four races of the former, Kratz was only able to take a lone podium at Abu Dhabi to take fifth in points. In the latter, Kratz scored a lone win at Algarve, as well as podiums at Le Castellet and Aragón to end the year third in points. During 2023, Kratz also raced for the same team in select rounds of the 24H GT Series, winning the 12 Hours of Estoril overall.

In 2024, Kratz remained with WTM by Rinaldi Racing to race in the European Le Mans Series, as well as returning to Konrad Motorsport to race in Prototype Cup Germany. Scoring a best result of fourth in the former and finishing 10th in the LMP3 standings, Kratz found more success in the latter, taking two wins at the Lausitzring and five more podiums to secure runner-up honors. During 2024, Kratz also made a one-off appearance in the Le Mans round of the Le Mans Cup for WTM by Rinaldi, in which he won race one.

Returning to WTM by Rinaldi for the 2025 European Le Mans Series season, Kratz scored a best result of fourth at Imola en route to a 12th-place points finish in LMP3. During 2025, Kratz also made select appearances in the 24H Series for Hofor Racing, winning the 12 Hours of Spa-Francorchamps and the 24 Hours of Barcelona in GT3 Am. Kratz continued with Hofor Racing for the 2025–26 24H Series Middle East season, scoring a GT3 Am class podium at the Dubai 24 Hour by finishing second in class and 12th overall.

In 2026, Kratz continued with Hofor Racing to race in the 24H Series. With the AMG-fielding team, Kratz won the 12 Hours of Paul Ricard overall and took two other podiums en route to the GT3 Am title. At the end of the year, Kratz made his debut in LMP2 competition for Inter Europol Competition in the 2026–27 Asian Le Mans Series.

== Racing record ==
=== Racing career summary ===
Season	Series	Team	Races	Wins	Poles	F/Laps	Podiums	Points	Position
2005	VLN Series								
2005	24 Hours of Nürburgring – V3		1	0	0	0	0	—N/a	5th
2006	24 Hours of Nürburgring – V2		1	0	0	0	0	—N/a	5th
2007	Rundstrecken-Challenge Nürburgring								**2nd**
2007	24 Hours of Nürburgring – V3-V4		1	0	0	0	0	—N/a	DNF
2008	VLN Series								
2009	24 Hours of Nürburgring – SP3T	ADAC Nordbaden e.V	1	0	0	0	0	—N/a	DNF
2010	24 Hours of Nürburgring – V4		1	0	0	0	0	—N/a	4th
2011	24 Hours of Nürburgring – SP4T	ADAC Nordbaden e.V.	1	0	0	0	0	—N/a	DNF
2012	24 Hours of Nürburgring – SP4T	MSC Odenkirchen	1	0	0	0	0	—N/a	DNF
2013	24 Hours of Nürburgring – SP8	Adrenalin Motorsport	1	0	0	0	0	—N/a	4th
2014	24 Hours of Nürburgring – V3	Torsten Kratz	1	0	0	0	0	—N/a	9th
2015	VLN Series – Cup 5	Team Securtal Sorg Rennsport	5	0	0	0	0	30	16th
2015	VLN Series – SP10	Team Securtal Sorg Rennsport	1	0	0	0	0	0	NC
2015	24 Hours of Nürburgring – Cup 5	Team Securtal Sorg Rennsport	1	1	0	0	1	—N/a	**1st**
2015	24H Series – SP3	Team Securtal Sorg Rennsport	2	0	1	0	1	0	NC
2016	VLN Series – Cup 5	Team Securtal Sorg Rennsport						24	18th
2016	24 Hours of Nürburgring – SP10	Team Securtal Sorg Rennsport	1	0	0	0	0	—N/a	DNF
2016	24H Series – SP3	Team Securtal Sorg Rennsport	1	0	0	0	0	0	NC
2017	VLN Series – Cup 5	Securtal Sorg Rennsport	1	0	0	0	0	24	22nd
2017	24 Hours of Nürburgring – V4	Securtal Sorg Rennsport	1	1	0	0	1	—N/a	**1st**
2018	VLN Series – V4	Securtal Sorg Rennsport	9	1	2	1	6	0	NC
2018	24 Hours of Nürburgring – KL Cup	Securtal Sorg Rennsport	1	1	0	0	1	—N/a	**1st**
2018	24 Hours of Nürburgring – V4	Securtal Sorg Rennsport	1	1	0	0	1	—N/a	**1st**
2019	VLN Series – V4	Team AVIA Sorg Rennsport	8	3	0	0	7	66.54	4th
2019	VLN Series – SP10	Team AVIA Sorg Rennsport	3	0	0	0	1	11.46	17th
2019	VLN Series – SP8T	Team AVIA Sorg Rennsport	2	0	0	0	0	10	17th
2019	24 Hours of Nürburgring – V4	Team AVIA Sorg Rennsport	1	0	0	0	0	—N/a	6th
2019	ADAC GT4 Germany	Team AVIA Sorg Rennsport	2	0	0	0	0	0	NC
2019	24H GT Series – GT4	Team AVIA Sorg Rennsport	1	0	0	0	0	22	NC
2020	Nürburgring Langstrecken-Serie – Cup 3	Team AVIA Sorg Rennsport	4	0	0	0	0	10.98	19th
2020	Nürburgring Langstrecken-Serie – V4	Team AVIA Sorg Rennsport	1	0	0	0	0	0	NC
2020	24 Hours of Nürburgring – V2T	Team AVIA Sorg Rennsport	1	0	0	0	1	—N/a	**2nd**
2021	Nürburgring Langstrecken-Serie – Cup 3	Team AVIA Sorg Rennsport	6	0	0	0	0	14.01	20th
2021	Nürburgring Langstrecken-Serie – SP10	Team AVIA Sorg Rennsport	1	0	0	0	0	0	NC
2021	Le Mans Cup – LMP3	WTM Powered by Phoenix	7	0	0	0	2	37.5	8th
2022	Asian Le Mans Series – LMP3	Rinaldi Racing	4	0	0	0	1	54	**2nd**
2022	Le Mans Cup – LMP3	WTM Racing	7	0	3	0	0	34	8th
2022	Prototype Cup Germany	WTM Racing	6	2	1	0	4	97	**2nd**
2022	Porsche Endurance Trophy Nürburgring Cup – Cup3	Team Sorg Rennsport	5	0	0	0	0	0	NC
2023	Asian Le Mans Series – LMP3	WTM by Rinaldi Racing	4	0	4	0	1	31	5th
2023	European Le Mans Series – LMP3	WTM by Rinaldi Racing	6	1	1	0	3	66	**3rd**
2023	24H GT Series – GT3 Am	WTM by Rinaldi Racing	2	1	0	0	1	72	10th
2023	Le Mans Cup – LMP3	WTM by Rinaldi Racing	2	0	0	0	1	0	33rd
2023	Le Mans Cup – LMP3	Murphy Prototypes	2	0	0	0	0	0	33rd
2023	Endurance Prototype Challenge – LMP3	Konrad Motorsport	1	0	0	0	0	6	32nd
2023	Porsche Endurance Trophy Nürburgring Cup – Cup3	Team Sorg Rennsport	7	0	0	0	2	84.5	9th
2023	24 Hours of Nürburgring – TCR	MSC Kempenich	1	0	0	0	1	—N/a	**3rd**
2023–24	Middle East Trophy – GT3 Am	HAAS RT	2	0	0	0	0	32	7th
2024	European Le Mans Series – LMP3	WTM by Rinaldi Racing	6	0	0	0	0	38	10th
2024	Le Mans Cup – LMP3	WTM by Rinaldi Racing	2	1	0	0	1	0	NC
2024	Prototype Cup Germany	Konrad Motorsport	12	2	0	0	7	197	**2nd**
2024	Nürburgring Langstrecken-Serie – SP9 Pro-Am	Konrad Motorsport	2	0	0	0	1	0	NC
2024	24 Hours of Nürburgring – SP9 Pro-Am	Konrad Motorsport	1	0	0	0	1	—N/a	**3rd**
2025	European Le Mans Series – LMP3	WTM by Rinaldi Racing	6	0	1	0	0	29	12th
2025	24H Series – GT3 Am	Hofor Racing	3	2	0	0	2	112	7th
2025–26	24H Series Middle East – GT3 Am	Hofor Racing	2	0	0	0	1	52	5th
2026	24H Series – GT3 Am	Hofor Racing	5	1	0	0	3	152	**1st**
2026	24 Hours of Nürburgring – Cup2 Am	Hofor Racing	1	0	0	0	0	—N/a	DNF
2026	Prototype Cup Europe	LAREA GT1 Racing	1	0	0	0	0	0	NC
2026–27	Asian Le Mans Series – LMP2	Inter Europol Competition						*	*

=== Complete Le Mans Cup results ===
(key) (Races in bold indicate pole position; results in italics indicate fastest lap)

Year	Entrant	Class	Chassis	1	2	3	4	5	6	7	Rank	Points
2021	WTM Powered by Phoenix	LMP3	Duqueine M30 - D08	BAR; Ret	LEC; 10	MNZ; 11	LMS; 1 Ret	LMS; 2; 4	SPA; 3	POR; 3	8th	37.5
2022	WTM Racing	LMP3	Duqueine M30 - D08	**LEC**; 4	IMO; Ret	LMS; 1 Ret	**LMS**; **2**; 4	MNZ; 5	SPA; 15	**ALG**; 9	8th	34
2023	WTM by Rinaldi Racing	LMP3	Duqueine M30 - D08	CAT	LMS; 1 Ret	LMS; 2; 2	LEC				33rd	0
2023	Murphy Prototypes	LMP3	Duqueine M30 - D08					ARA; NC	SPA	ALG; 12	33rd	0
2024	WTM by Rinaldi Racing	LMP3	Duqueine M30 - D08	CAT	LEC	LMS; 1; 1	LMS; 2; 6	SPA	MUG	ALG	NC	0

=== Complete Asian Le Mans Series results ===
(key) (Races in bold indicate pole position) (Races in italics indicate fastest lap)

Year	Team	Class	Car	Engine	1	2	3	4	Pos.	Points
2022	Rinaldi Racing	LMP3	Duqueine M30 - D08	Nissan VK50VE 5.0 L V8	DUB; 1; 4	DUB; 2; 4	ABU; 1; 2	ABU; 2; 4	3rd	54
2023	WTM by Rinaldi Racing	LMP3	Duqueine M30 - D08	Nissan VK50VE 5.0 L V8	**DUB**; **1** Ret	**DUB**; **2**; 4	**ABU**; **1**; 3	**ABU**; **2** Ret	5th	31

=== Complete Prototype Cup Germany results ===
(key) (Races in bold indicate pole position) (Races in italics indicate fastest lap)

Year	Team	Car	Engine	1	2	3	4	5	6	7	8	9	10	11	12	13	14	DC	Points
2022	Wochenspiegel Team Monschau	Duqueine M30 - D08	Nissan VK56DE 5.6 L V8	SPA; 1; 2	SPA; 2; 3	NÜR; 1	NÜR; 2	LAU; 1; 6	LAU; 2; 6	HOC; 1; 1	**HOC**; **2**; 1							2nd	97
2024	Konrad Motorsport	Ligier JS P320	Nissan VK56DE 5.6 L V8	SPA; 1 C	SPA; 2 C	LAU; 1; 2	LAU; 2; 1	LAU; 3; 1	ZAN; 1; 2	ZAN; 2; 3	HOC; 1; 3	HOC; 2; 8	HOC; 3; 2	NÜR; 1; 6	NÜR; 2; 8	SAC; 1; 6	SAC; 2; 4	2nd	197

=== Complete European Le Mans Series results ===
(key) (Races in bold indicate pole position; results in italics indicate fastest lap)

Year	Entrant	Class	Chassis	Engine	1	2	3	4	5	6	Rank	Points
2023	WTM by Rinaldi Racing	LMP3	Duqueine M30 - D08	Nissan VK56DE 5.6 L V8	CAT; Ret	**LEC**; 2	ARA; 2	SPA; DSQ	ALG; 1	ALG; 8	3rd	66
2024	WTM by Rinaldi Racing	LMP3	Duqueine M30 - D08	Nissan VK56DE 5.6 L V8	CAT; 8	LEC; Ret	IMO; 5	SPA; 8	MUG; 6	ALG; 4	10th	38
2025	WTM by Rinaldi Racing	LMP3	Duqueine D09	Toyota V35A-FTS 3.5 L V6	CAT; 6	LEC; Ret	IMO; 4	SPA; 7	**SIL**; Ret	ALG; 9	12th	29
