= 2022 Road to Le Mans =

French autorace held in 2022

Circuit de la Sarthe track

The 7th Road to Le Mans was a sports car race that took place on 9 and 11 June 2022, at the Circuit de la Sarthe, Le Mans, France. The race features LMP3 and GT3 category cars competing in their respective classes.

== Entry list ==
Icon	Series
MLMS	Michelin Le Mans Cup
ELMS	European Le Mans Series
GTWC	SRO GT World Challenge
ALMS	Asian Le Mans Series
PTCG	ADAC Prototype Cup Germany
RLMS	Road to Le Mans only

No.	Entrant	Car	Series	Driver 1	Driver 2
LMP3 (36 entries)
2	(United Kingdom) United Autosports	Ligier JS P320 – Nissan	MLMS	(United Kingdom) Max Lynn	(United Kingdom) Shaun Lynn
3	(Luxembourg) DKR Engineering	Duqueine M30 – D08 – Nissan	MLMS	(United States) Jon Brownson	(Germany) Laurents Hörr
4	(United Kingdom) Nielsen Racing	Ligier JS P320 – Nissan	MLMS	(United Kingdom) Matthew Bell	(United Kingdom) John Melsom
6	(France) ANS Motorsport	Ligier JS P320 – Nissan	MLMS	(Switzerland) Jonathan Brossard	(France) Nicholas Schatz
7	(United Kingdom) Nielsen Racing	Ligier JS P320 – Nissan	MLMS	(United Kingdom) Colin Noble	(United Kingdom) Anthony Wells
9	(Austria) AT Racing Team	Ligier JS P320 – Nissan	MLMS	(Austria) Alexander Talkanitsa Jr.	(Austria) Alexander Talkanitsa Sr.
10	(Switzerland) Racing Spirit of Léman	Ligier JS P320 – Nissan	MLMS	(France) Tom Dillmann	(Germany) Alexander Mattschull
11	(Germany) Wochenspiegel Team Monschau	Duqueine M30 – D08 – Nissan	MLMS	(Germany) Torsten Kratz	(Germany) Leonard Weiss
13	(Switzerland) Haegeli by T2 Racing	Duqueine M30 – D08 – Nissan	MLMS	(Germany) Marc Basseng	(Switzerland) Pieder Decurtins
14	(Luxembourg) DKR Engineering	Duqueine M30 – D08 – Nissan	MLMS	(United Arab Emirates) Alexander Bukhantsov	(Australia) James Winslow
15	(United Kingdom) RLR MSport	Ligier JS P320 – Nissan	ELMS	(Austria) Horst Felbermayr Jr.	(United Kingdom) Alex Kapadia
17	(France) IDEC Sport	Ligier JS P320 – Nissan	MLMS	(France) Patrice Lafargue	(France) Dino Lunardi
20	(United Kingdom) Optimum Motorsport	Duqueine M30 – D08 – Nissan	MLMS	(United Kingdom) Mark Crader	(United Kingdom) Alex Mortimer
21	(United Kingdom) United Autosports	Ligier JS P320 – Nissan	ELMS	(United States) James McGuire	(United Kingdom) Guy Smith
22	(United Kingdom) United Autosports	Ligier JS P320 – Nissan	MLMS	(Australia) Andres Latorre	(Australia) Garnet Patterson
23	(United Kingdom) United Autosports	Ligier JS P320 – Nissan	MLMS	(United Kingdom) Wayne Boyd	(United States) John Schauerman
25	(Switzerland) Cool Racing	Ligier JS P320 – Nissan	ELMS	(United Kingdom) Mike Benham	(United Kingdom) Duncan Tappy
27	(United Kingdom) 24-7 Motorsport	Ligier JS P320 – Nissan	MLMS	(United Kingdom) Andrew Ferguson	(United Kingdom) Jeremy Ferguson
28	(France) MV2S Forestier Racing	Ligier JS P320 – Nissan	MLMS	(France) Emilien Carde	(France) Christophe Cresp
29	(France) MV2S Forestier Racing	Ligier JS P320 – Nissan	MLMS	(France) Louis Rousset	(Switzerland) Jérôme de Sadeleer
30	(Germany) Frikadelli Racing Team	Ligier JS P320 – Nissan	MLMS	(Germany) Klaus Abbelen	(Germany) Felipe Fernández Laser
31	(Italy) AF Corse	Ligier JS P320 – Nissan	MLMS	(United States) Trenton Estep	(United States) Mark Kvamme
32	(United Kingdom) United Autosports	Ligier JS P320 – Nissan	MLMS	(United Kingdom) Andy Meyrick	(Brazil) Daniel Schneider
33	(Poland) Team Virage	Ligier JS P320 – Nissan	MLMS	(United States) Rob Hodes	(Guatemala) Ian Rodríguez
37	(Spain) CD Sport	Ligier JS P320 – Nissan	MLMS	(France) Grégory Guilvert	(France) Fabien Michal
40	(France) Graff Racing	Ligier JS P320 – Nissan	MLMS	(Switzerland) Luis Sanjuan	(Switzerland) Théo Vaucher
43	(Switzerland) Racing Spirit of Léman	Ligier JS P320 – Nissan	MLMS	(United Kingdom) Josh Skelton	(France) Jacques Wolff
53	(United Kingdom) RLR MSport	Ligier JS P320 – Nissan	ELMS	(Chile) Nico Pino	(United Kingdom) Martin Rich
54	(Poland) Inter Europol Competition	Ligier JS P320 – Nissan	ELMS	(France) Noam Abramczyk	(United States) Don Yount
57	(France) Graff Racing	Ligier JS P320 – Nissan	MLMS	(United Kingdom) Ryan Harper-Ellam	(Switzerland) Stephan Rupp
66	(Germany) Rinaldi Racing	Duqueine M30 – D08 – Nissan	MLMS	(Germany) Daniel Keilwitz	(Germany) Steve Parrow
69	(Switzerland) Cool Racing	Ligier JS P320 – Nissan	ELMS	(Denmark) Malthe Jakobsen	(United States) Maurice Smith
72	(Poland) Team Virage	Ligier JS P320 – Nissan	MLMS	(France) Mathis Poulet	(France) Alexandre Yvon
73	(Italy) TS Corse	Duqueine M30 – D08 – Nissan	MLMS	(Chile) Benjamín Hites	(Italy) Pietro Peccenini
76	(Germany) Reiter Engineering	Ligier JS P320 – Nissan	MLMS	(United Kingdom) Freddie Hunt	(Norway) Mads Siljehaug
77	(Iceland) Team Thor	Ligier JS P320 – Nissan	MLMS	(Iceland) Auðunn Guðmundsson	(Denmark) Michael H. Markussen
Innovative Car (1 entry)
24	(France) H24 Racing	H24	RLMS	(Monaco) Stéphane Richelmi	
GT3 (13 entries)
19	(Germany) Leipert Motorsport	Lamborghini Huracán GT3 Evo	GTWC	(United States) Gregg Gorski	(United States) Gerhard Watzinger
34	(Belgium) Belgian Audi Club Team WRT	Audi R8 LMS Evo II	GTWC	(France) Arnold Robin	(France) Maxime Robin
44	(Denmark) GMB Motorsport	Honda NSX GT3 Evo22	MLMS	(Denmark) Gustav Birch	(Denmark) Jens Reno Møller
46	(Italy) Ebimotors	Porsche 911 GT3 R	MLMS	(Italy) Fabio Babini	(Italy) Emanuele Busnelli
51	(Italy) AF Corse	Ferrari 488 GT3 Evo 2020	MLMS	(United Kingdom) Luke Davenport	(Spain) Marcos Vivian
52	(Switzerland) Spirit of Race	Ferrari 488 GT3 Evo 2020	GTWC	(France) Hugo Delacour	(Monaco) Cédric Sbirrazzuoli
55	(Denmark) GMB Motorsport	Honda NSX GT3 Evo22	MLMS	(Denmark) Kasper H. Jensen	(Denmark) Kristian Poulsen
61	(Italy) AF Corse	Ferrari 488 GT3 Evo 2020	MLMS	(Switzerland) Gino Forgione	(Italy) Andrea Montermini
66	(Italy) Ebimotors	Porsche 911 GT3 R	RLMS	(Italy) Max Busnelli	(Italy) Paolo Venerosi Pesciolini
74	(Switzerland) Kessel Racing	Ferrari 488 GT3 Evo 2020	RLMS	(Australia) Scott Andrews	(United States) Anton Dias Perera
83	(France) Racetivity	Mercedes-AMG GT3 Evo	RLMS	(France) Jean-Bernard Bouvet	(France) Charles-Henri Samani
88	(Denmark) GMB Motorsport	Honda NSX GT3 Evo22	MLMS	(Denmark) Lars Engelbreckt Pedersen	(Denmark) Mikkel O. Pedersen
99	(Spain) Bullitt Racing	Aston Martin Vantage AMR GT3	MLMS	(France) Valentin Hasse-Clot	(United Kingdom) Stephen Pattrick

=== Reserve entries ===
In addition to the fifty entries given invitations for the race, nine entries were put on a reserve list to potentially replace any invitations that were not accepted or withdrawn. Reserve entries are ordered with the first reserve replacing the first withdrawal from the race, regardless of the class of either entry.

Reserve	Class	Entrant	Car	Series	Driver 1	Driver 2
1st	LMP3	(Italy) Eurointernational	Ligier JS P320 – Nissan	ELMS	(United Kingdom) Richard Bradley	(Japan) Yuki Tanaka
2nd	LMP3	(Belgium) Mühlner Motorsport	Duqueine M30 – D08 – Nissan	PTCG	(Germany) Matthias Lüthen	(Belgium) Ugo de Wilde
3rd	LMP3	(Luxembourg) DKR Engineering	Duqueine M30 – D08 – Nissan	ELMS	(Belgium) Tom van Rompuy	
4th	GT3	(Italy) AF Corse	Ferrari 488 GT3 Evo 2020	RLMS	(United States) Mark Kvamme	
5th	LMP3	(Poland) Inter Europol Competition	Ligier JS P320 – Nissan	PTCG	(United States) Maxwell Hanratty	(United States) Don Yount
6th	LMP3	(France) ANS Motorsport	Ligier JS P320 – Nissan	MLMS		
7th	GT3	(Switzerland) Spirit of Race	Ferrari 488 GT3 Evo 2020	ALMS	(Puerto Rico) Francesco Piovanetti	
8th	GT3	(Germany) Leipert Motorsport	Lamborghini Huracán GT3 Evo	RLMS	(United States) Lance Bergstein	
9th	GT3	(United Kingdom) Balfe Motorsport	Audi R8 LMS Evo II	GTWC	(United Kingdom) Shaun Balfe	(United Kingdom) Adam Carroll

== Qualifying ==
Provisional pole positions in each class are denoted in bold.

=== Race 1 ===
Pos.	Class	No.	Team	Qualifying	Grid

=== Race 2 ===
Pos.	Class	No.	Team	Qualifying	Grid

== Races ==
Class winners are marked in bold.

Race 1 Result
Race 2 Result

=== Race 1 Result ===
Pos	Class	No.	Team	Drivers	Chassis	Tyre	Laps	Time/Reason
Pos	Class	No.	Team	Drivers	Engine	Tyre	Laps	Time/Reason
1	LMP3	10	(Switzerland) Racing Spirit of Léman	(France) Tom Dillmann (Germany) Alexander Mattschull	Ligier JS P320	MI	12	57:46.483
1	LMP3	10	(Switzerland) Racing Spirit of Léman	(France) Tom Dillmann (Germany) Alexander Mattschull	Nissan 5.6 L V8	MI	12	57:46.483
2	LMP3	43	(Switzerland) Racing Spirit of Léman	(United Kingdom) Josh Skelton (France) Jacques Wolff	Ligier JS P320	MI	12	+0.921 s
2	LMP3	43	(Switzerland) Racing Spirit of Léman	(United Kingdom) Josh Skelton (France) Jacques Wolff	Nissan 5.6 L V8	MI	12	+0.921 s
3	LMP3	7	(United Kingdom) Nielsen Racing	(United Kingdom) Colin Noble (United Kingdom) Anthony Wells	Ligier JS P320	MI	12	+3.081 s
3	LMP3	7	(United Kingdom) Nielsen Racing	(United Kingdom) Colin Noble (United Kingdom) Anthony Wells	Nissan 5.6 L V8	MI	12	+3.081 s
4	LMP3	23	(United Kingdom) United Autosports	(United Kingdom) Wayne Boyd (United States) John Schauerman	Ligier JS P320	MI	12	+3.979 s
4	LMP3	23	(United Kingdom) United Autosports	(United Kingdom) Wayne Boyd (United States) John Schauerman	Nissan 5.6 L V8	MI	12	+3.979 s
5	LMP3	76	(Germany) Reiter Engineering	(United Kingdom) Freddie Hunt (Norway) Mads Siljehaug	Ligier JS P320	MI	12	+5.910 s
5	LMP3	76	(Germany) Reiter Engineering	(United Kingdom) Freddie Hunt (Norway) Mads Siljehaug	Nissan 5.6 L V8	MI	12	+5.910 s
6	LMP3	25	(Switzerland) Cool Racing	(United Kingdom) Mike Benham (United Kingdom) Duncan Tappy	Ligier JS P320	MI	12	+14.327 s
6	LMP3	25	(Switzerland) Cool Racing	(United Kingdom) Mike Benham (United Kingdom) Duncan Tappy	Nissan 5.6 L V8	MI	12	+14.327 s
7	LMP3	29	(France) MV2S Forestier Racing	(France) Louis Rousset (Switzerland) Jérôme de Sadeleer	Ligier JS P320	MI	12	+23.033 s
7	LMP3	29	(France) MV2S Forestier Racing	(France) Louis Rousset (Switzerland) Jérôme de Sadeleer	Nissan 5.6 L V8	MI	12	+23.033 s
8	LMP3	14	(Luxembourg) DKR Engineering	(United Arab Emirates) Alexander Bukhantsov (Australia) James Winslow	Duqueine M30 – D08	MI	12	+23.607 s
8	LMP3	14	(Luxembourg) DKR Engineering	(United Arab Emirates) Alexander Bukhantsov (Australia) James Winslow	Nissan 5.6 L V8	MI	12	+23.607 s
9	LMP3	72	(Poland) Team Virage	(France) Mathis Poulet (France) Alexandre Yvon	Ligier JS P320	MI	12	+50.755 s
9	LMP3	72	(Poland) Team Virage	(France) Mathis Poulet (France) Alexandre Yvon	Nissan 5.6 L V8	MI	12	+50.755 s
10	LMP3	32	(United Kingdom) United Autosports	(United Kingdom) Andy Meyrick (Brazil) Daniel Schneider	Ligier JS P320	MI	12	+1:03.243
10	LMP3	32	(United Kingdom) United Autosports	(United Kingdom) Andy Meyrick (Brazil) Daniel Schneider	Nissan 5.6 L V8	MI	12	+1:03.243
11	LMP3	57	(France) Graff Racing	(United Kingdom) Ryan Harper-Ellam (Switzerland) Stephan Rupp	Ligier JS P320	MI	12	+1:03.443
11	LMP3	57	(France) Graff Racing	(United Kingdom) Ryan Harper-Ellam (Switzerland) Stephan Rupp	Nissan 5.6 L V8	MI	12	+1:03.443
12	LMP3	66	(Germany) Rinaldi Racing	(Germany) Daniel Keilwitz (Germany) Steve Parrow	Duqueine M30 – D08	MI	12	+1:04.121
12	LMP3	66	(Germany) Rinaldi Racing	(Germany) Daniel Keilwitz (Germany) Steve Parrow	Nissan 5.6 L V8	MI	12	+1:04.121
13	LMP3	3	(Luxembourg) DKR Engineering	(United States) Jon Brownson (Germany) Laurents Hörr	Duqueine M30 – D08	MI	12	+1:05.538
13	LMP3	3	(Luxembourg) DKR Engineering	(United States) Jon Brownson (Germany) Laurents Hörr	Nissan 5.6 L V8	MI	12	+1:05.538
14	LMP3	53	(United Kingdom) RLR MSport	(Chile) Nico Pino (United Kingdom) Martin Rich	Ligier JS P320	MI	12	+1:10.537
14	LMP3	53	(United Kingdom) RLR MSport	(Chile) Nico Pino (United Kingdom) Martin Rich	Nissan 5.6 L V8	MI	12	+1:10.537
15	LMP3	6	(France) ANS Motorsport	(Switzerland) Jonathan Brossard (France) Nicholas Schatz	Ligier JS P320	MI	12	+1:10.704
15	LMP3	6	(France) ANS Motorsport	(Switzerland) Jonathan Brossard (France) Nicholas Schatz	Nissan 5.6 L V8	MI	12	+1:10.704
16	LMP3	15	(United Kingdom) RLR MSport	(Austria) Horst Felbermayr Jr. (United Kingdom) Alex Kapadia	Ligier JS P320	MI	12	+1:10.816
16	LMP3	15	(United Kingdom) RLR MSport	(Austria) Horst Felbermayr Jr. (United Kingdom) Alex Kapadia	Nissan 5.6 L V8	MI	12	+1:10.816
17	LMP3	73	(Italy) TS Corse	(Chile) Benjamín Hites (Italy) Pietro Peccenini	Duqueine M30 – D08	MI	12	+1:16.224
17	LMP3	73	(Italy) TS Corse	(Chile) Benjamín Hites (Italy) Pietro Peccenini	Nissan 5.6 L V8	MI	12	+1:16.224
18	LMP3	77	(Iceland) Team Thor	(Iceland) Auðunn Guðmundsson (Denmark) Michael H. Markussen	Ligier JS P320	MI	12	+1:22.788
18	LMP3	77	(Iceland) Team Thor	(Iceland) Auðunn Guðmundsson (Denmark) Michael H. Markussen	Nissan 5.6 L V8	MI	12	+1:22.788
19	LMP3	31	(Italy) AF Corse	(United States) Trenton Estep (United States) Mark Kvamme	Ligier JS P320	MI	12	+1:28.637
19	LMP3	31	(Italy) AF Corse	(United States) Trenton Estep (United States) Mark Kvamme	Nissan 5.6 L V8	MI	12	+1:28.637
20	LMP3	37	(Spain) CD Sport	(France) Grégory Guilvert (France) Fabien Michal	Ligier JS P320	MI	12	+1:38.588
20	LMP3	37	(Spain) CD Sport	(France) Grégory Guilvert (France) Fabien Michal	Nissan 5.6 L V8	MI	12	+1:38.588
21	LMP3	13	(Switzerland) Haegeli by T2 Racing	(Germany) Marc Basseng (Switzerland) Pieder Decurtins	Duqueine M30 – D08	MI	12	+2:01.126
21	LMP3	13	(Switzerland) Haegeli by T2 Racing	(Germany) Marc Basseng (Switzerland) Pieder Decurtins	Nissan 5.6 L V8	MI	12	+2:01.126
22	LMP3	40	(France) Graff Racing	(Switzerland) Luis Sanjuan (Switzerland) Théo Vaucher	Ligier JS P320	MI	12	+2:05.715
22	LMP3	40	(France) Graff Racing	(Switzerland) Luis Sanjuan (Switzerland) Théo Vaucher	Nissan 5.6 L V8	MI	12	+2:05.715
23	LMP3	30	(Germany) Frikadelli Racing Team	(Germany) Klaus Abbelen (Germany) Felipe Fernández Laser	Ligier JS P320	MI	12	+2:15.188
23	LMP3	30	(Germany) Frikadelli Racing Team	(Germany) Klaus Abbelen (Germany) Felipe Fernández Laser	Nissan 5.6 L V8	MI	12	+2:15.188
24	LMP3	28	(France) MV2S Forestier Racing	(France) Emilien Carde (France) Christophe Cresp	Ligier JS P320	MI	12	+2:17.180
24	LMP3	28	(France) MV2S Forestier Racing	(France) Emilien Carde (France) Christophe Cresp	Nissan 5.6 L V8	MI	12	+2:17.180
25	LMP3	2	(United Kingdom) United Autosports	(United Kingdom) Max Lynn (United Kingdom) Shaun Lynn	Ligier JS P320	MI	12	+2:23.554
25	LMP3	2	(United Kingdom) United Autosports	(United Kingdom) Max Lynn (United Kingdom) Shaun Lynn	Nissan 5.6 L V8	MI	12	+2:23.554
26	LMP3	17	(France) IDEC Sport	(France) Patrice Lafargue (France) Dino Lunardi	Ligier JS P320	MI	12	+2:23.894
26	LMP3	17	(France) IDEC Sport	(France) Patrice Lafargue (France) Dino Lunardi	Nissan 5.6 L V8	MI	12	+2:23.894
27	GT3	46	(Italy) Ebimotors	(Italy) Fabio Babini (Italy) Emanuele Busnelli	Porsche 911 GT3 R	MI	12	+2:36.202
27	GT3	46	(Italy) Ebimotors	(Italy) Fabio Babini (Italy) Emanuele Busnelli	Porsche 4.0 L Flat-6	MI	12	+2:36.202
28	GT3	34	(Belgium) Belgian Audi Club Team WRT	(France) Arnold Robin (France) Maxime Robin	Audi R8 LMS Evo II	MI	12	+2:36.805
28	GT3	34	(Belgium) Belgian Audi Club Team WRT	(France) Arnold Robin (France) Maxime Robin	Audi 5.2 L V10	MI	12	+2:36.805
29	GT3	55	(Denmark) GMB Motorsport	(Denmark) Kasper H. Jensen (Denmark) Kristian Poulsen	Honda NSX GT3 Evo22	MI	12	+2:37.369
29	GT3	55	(Denmark) GMB Motorsport	(Denmark) Kasper H. Jensen (Denmark) Kristian Poulsen	Honda 3.5 L Turbo V6	MI	12	+2:37.369
30	GT3	61	(Italy) AF Corse	(Switzerland) Gino Forgione (Italy) Andrea Montermini	Ferrari 488 GT3	MI	12	+2:37.737
30	GT3	61	(Italy) AF Corse	(Switzerland) Gino Forgione (Italy) Andrea Montermini	Ferrari F154CB 3.9 L Turbo V8	MI	12	+2:37.737
31	GT3	56	(Italy) Ebimotors	(Italy) Max Busnelli (Italy) Paolo Venerosi Pesciolini	Porsche 911 GT3 R	MI	12	+2:42.614
31	GT3	56	(Italy) Ebimotors	(Italy) Max Busnelli (Italy) Paolo Venerosi Pesciolini	Porsche 4.0 L Flat-6	MI	12	+2:42.614
32	GT3	44	(Denmark) GMB Motorsport	(Denmark) Gustav Birch (Denmark) Jens Reno Møller	Honda NSX GT3 Evo22	MI	12	+2:49.119
32	GT3	44	(Denmark) GMB Motorsport	(Denmark) Gustav Birch (Denmark) Jens Reno Møller	Honda 3.5 L Turbo V6	MI	12	+2:49.119
32	GT3	99	(Spain) Bullitt Racing	(France) Valentin Hasse-Clot (United Kingdom) Stephen Pattrick	Aston Martin Vantage GT3	MI	12	+2:53.160
32	GT3	99	(Spain) Bullitt Racing	(France) Valentin Hasse-Clot (United Kingdom) Stephen Pattrick	Aston Martin 4.0 L Turbo V8	MI	12	+2:53.160
34	LMP3	69	(Switzerland) Cool Racing	(Denmark) Malthe Jakobsen (United States) Maurice Smith	Ligier JS P320	MI	11	+1 Lap
34	LMP3	69	(Switzerland) Cool Racing	(Denmark) Malthe Jakobsen (United States) Maurice Smith	Nissan 5.6 L V8	MI	11	+1 Lap
35	LMP3	20	(United Kingdom) Optimum Motorsport	(United Kingdom) Mark Crader (United Kingdom) Alex Mortimer	Duqueine M30 – D08	MI	11	+1 Lap
35	LMP3	20	(United Kingdom) Optimum Motorsport	(United Kingdom) Mark Crader (United Kingdom) Alex Mortimer	Nissan 5.6 L V8	MI	11	+1 Lap
36	GT3	19	(Germany) Leipert Motorsport	(United States) Gregg Gorski (United States) Gerhard Watzinger	Lamborghini Huracán GT3 Evo	MI	11	+1 Lap
36	GT3	19	(Germany) Leipert Motorsport	(United States) Gregg Gorski (United States) Gerhard Watzinger	Lamborghini 5.2 L V10	MI	11	+1 Lap
37	GT3	88	(Denmark) GMB Motorsport	(Denmark) Lars Engelbreckt Pedersen (Denmark) Mikkel O. Pedersen	Honda NSX GT3 Evo22	MI	11	+1 Lap
37	GT3	88	(Denmark) GMB Motorsport	(Denmark) Lars Engelbreckt Pedersen (Denmark) Mikkel O. Pedersen	Honda 3.5 L Turbo V6	MI	11	+1 Lap
DNF	LMP3	22	(United Kingdom) United Autosports	(Australia) Andres Latorre (Australia) Garnet Patterson	Ligier JS P320	MI	11	Accident Damage
DNF	LMP3	22	(United Kingdom) United Autosports	(Australia) Andres Latorre (Australia) Garnet Patterson	Nissan 5.6 L V8	MI	11	Accident Damage
DNF	LMP3	54	(Poland) Inter Europol Competition	(France) Noam Abramczyk (United States) Don Yount	Ligier JS P320	MI	9	
DNF	LMP3	54	(Poland) Inter Europol Competition	(France) Noam Abramczyk (United States) Don Yount	Nissan 5.6 L V8	MI	9	
DNF	LMP3	33	(Poland) Team Virage	(United States) Rob Hodes (Guatemala) Ian Rodríguez	Ligier JS P320	MI	8	Accident
DNF	LMP3	33	(Poland) Team Virage	(United States) Rob Hodes (Guatemala) Ian Rodríguez	Nissan 5.6 L V8	MI	8	Accident
DNF	INV	24	(France) H24 Racing	(Monaco) Stéphane Richelmi	H24	MI	8	
DNF	GT3	83	(France) Racetivity	(France) Jean-Bernard Bouvet (France) Charles-Henri Samani	Mercedes-AMG GT3 Evo	MI	4	Accident
DNF	GT3	83	(France) Racetivity	(France) Jean-Bernard Bouvet (France) Charles-Henri Samani	Mercedes-AMG M159 6.2 L V8	MI	4	Accident
DNF	LMP3	11	(Germany) Wochenspiegel Team Monschau	(Germany) Torsten Kratz (Germany) Leonard Weiss	Duqueine M30 – D08	MI	3	Accident Damage
DNF	LMP3	11	(Germany) Wochenspiegel Team Monschau	(Germany) Torsten Kratz (Germany) Leonard Weiss	Nissan 5.6 L V8	MI	3	Accident Damage
DNF	LMP3	9	(Austria) AT Racing Team	(Austria) Alexander Talkanitsa Jr. (Austria) Alexander Talkanitsa Sr.	Ligier JS P320	MI	1	Accident Damage
DNF	LMP3	9	(Austria) AT Racing Team	(Austria) Alexander Talkanitsa Jr. (Austria) Alexander Talkanitsa Sr.	Nissan 5.6 L V8	MI	1	Accident Damage
DNF	LMP3	4	(United Kingdom) Nielsen Racing	(United Kingdom) Matthew Bell (United Kingdom) John Melsom	Ligier JS P320	MI	1	Accident Damage
DNF	LMP3	4	(United Kingdom) Nielsen Racing	(United Kingdom) Matthew Bell (United Kingdom) John Melsom	Nissan 5.6 L V8	MI	1	Accident Damage
DNF	LMP3	21	(United Kingdom) United Autosports	(United States) James McGuire (United Kingdom) Guy Smith	Ligier JS P320	MI	0	Accident Damage
DNF	LMP3	21	(United Kingdom) United Autosports	(United States) James McGuire (United Kingdom) Guy Smith	Nissan 5.6 L V8	MI	0	Accident Damage
DNF	LMP3	27	(United Kingdom) 24-7 Motorsport	(United Kingdom) Andrew Ferguson (United Kingdom) Jeremy Ferguson	Ligier JS P320	MI	0	Accident
DNF	LMP3	27	(United Kingdom) 24-7 Motorsport	(United Kingdom) Andrew Ferguson (United Kingdom) Jeremy Ferguson	Nissan 5.6 L V8	MI	0	Accident
DNF	GT3	52	(Switzerland) Spirit of Race	(France) Hugo Delacour (Monaco) Cédric Sbirrazzuoli	Ferrari 488 GT3	MI	0	Accident
DNF	GT3	52	(Switzerland) Spirit of Race	(France) Hugo Delacour (Monaco) Cédric Sbirrazzuoli	Ferrari F154CB 3.9 L Turbo V8	MI	0	Accident

=== Race 2 Result ===
Pos	Class	No.	Team	Drivers	Chassis	Tyre	Laps	Time/Reason
Pos	Class	No.	Team	Drivers	Engine	Tyre	Laps	Time/Reason
1	LMP3	25	(Switzerland) Cool Racing	(United Kingdom) Mike Benham (United Kingdom) Duncan Tappy	Ligier JS P320	MI	11	55:15.950
1	LMP3	25	(Switzerland) Cool Racing	(United Kingdom) Mike Benham (United Kingdom) Duncan Tappy	Nissan 5.6 L V8	MI	11	55:15.950
2	LMP3	76	(Germany) Reiter Engineering	(United Kingdom) Freddie Hunt (Norway) Mads Siljehaug	Ligier JS P320	MI	11	+0.580 s
2	LMP3	76	(Germany) Reiter Engineering	(United Kingdom) Freddie Hunt (Norway) Mads Siljehaug	Nissan 5.6 L V8	MI	11	+0.580 s
3	LMP3	10	(Switzerland) Racing Spirit of Léman	(France) Tom Dillmann (Germany) Alexander Mattschull	Ligier JS P320	MI	11	+0.830 s
3	LMP3	10	(Switzerland) Racing Spirit of Léman	(France) Tom Dillmann (Germany) Alexander Mattschull	Nissan 5.6 L V8	MI	11	+0.830 s
4	LMP3	11	(Germany) Wochenspiegel Team Monschau	(Germany) Torsten Kratz (Germany) Leonard Weiss	Duqueine M30 – D08	MI	11	+1.185 s
4	LMP3	11	(Germany) Wochenspiegel Team Monschau	(Germany) Torsten Kratz (Germany) Leonard Weiss	Nissan 5.6 L V8	MI	11	+1.185 s
5	LMP3	69	(Switzerland) Cool Racing	(Denmark) Malthe Jakobsen (United States) Maurice Smith	Ligier JS P320	MI	11	+2.298 s
5	LMP3	69	(Switzerland) Cool Racing	(Denmark) Malthe Jakobsen (United States) Maurice Smith	Nissan 5.6 L V8	MI	11	+2.298 s
6	LMP3	37	(Spain) CD Sport	(France) Grégory Guilvert (France) Fabien Michal	Ligier JS P320	MI	11	+7.362 s
6	LMP3	37	(Spain) CD Sport	(France) Grégory Guilvert (France) Fabien Michal	Nissan 5.6 L V8	MI	11	+7.362 s
7	LMP3	14	(Luxembourg) DKR Engineering	(United Arab Emirates) Alexander Bukhantsov (Australia) James Winslow	Duqueine M30 – D08	MI	11	+7.771 s
7	LMP3	14	(Luxembourg) DKR Engineering	(United Arab Emirates) Alexander Bukhantsov (Australia) James Winslow	Nissan 5.6 L V8	MI	11	+7.771 s
8	LMP3	4	(United Kingdom) Nielsen Racing	(United Kingdom) Matthew Bell (United Kingdom) John Melsom	Duqueine M30 – D08	MI	11	+7.905 s
8	LMP3	4	(United Kingdom) Nielsen Racing	(United Kingdom) Matthew Bell (United Kingdom) John Melsom	Nissan 5.6 L V8	MI	11	+7.905 s
9	LMP3	7	(United Kingdom) Nielsen Racing	(United Kingdom) Colin Noble (United Kingdom) Anthony Wells	Ligier JS P320	MI	11	+9.050 s
9	LMP3	7	(United Kingdom) Nielsen Racing	(United Kingdom) Colin Noble (United Kingdom) Anthony Wells	Nissan 5.6 L V8	MI	11	+9.050 s
10	LMP3	72	(Poland) Team Virage	(France) Mathis Poulet (France) Alexandre Yvon	Ligier JS P320	MI	11	+9.791 s
10	LMP3	72	(Poland) Team Virage	(France) Mathis Poulet (France) Alexandre Yvon	Nissan 5.6 L V8	MI	11	+9.791 s
11	LMP3	29	(France) MV2S Forestier Racing	(France) Louis Rousset (Switzerland) Jérôme de Sadeleer	Ligier JS P320	MI	11	+10.976 s
11	LMP3	29	(France) MV2S Forestier Racing	(France) Louis Rousset (Switzerland) Jérôme de Sadeleer	Nissan 5.6 L V8	MI	11	+10.976 s
12	LMP3	32	(United Kingdom) United Autosports	(United Kingdom) Andy Meyrick (Brazil) Daniel Schneider	Ligier JS P320	MI	11	+12.256 s
12	LMP3	32	(United Kingdom) United Autosports	(United Kingdom) Andy Meyrick (Brazil) Daniel Schneider	Nissan 5.6 L V8	MI	11	+12.256 s
13	LMP3	20	(United Kingdom) Optimum Motorsport	(United Kingdom) Mark Crader (United Kingdom) Alex Mortimer	Duqueine M30 – D08	MI	11	+12.511 s
13	LMP3	20	(United Kingdom) Optimum Motorsport	(United Kingdom) Mark Crader (United Kingdom) Alex Mortimer	Nissan 5.6 L V8	MI	11	+12.511 s
14	LMP3	77	(Iceland) Team Thor	(Iceland) Auðunn Guðmundsson (Denmark) Michael H. Markussen	Ligier JS P320	MI	11	+13.549 s
14	LMP3	77	(Iceland) Team Thor	(Iceland) Auðunn Guðmundsson (Denmark) Michael H. Markussen	Nissan 5.6 L V8	MI	11	+13.549 s
15	LMP3	28	(France) MV2S Forestier Racing	(France) Emilien Carde (France) Christophe Cresp	Ligier JS P320	MI	11	+13.764 s
15	LMP3	28	(France) MV2S Forestier Racing	(France) Emilien Carde (France) Christophe Cresp	Nissan 5.6 L V8	MI	11	+13.764 s
16	LMP3	40	(France) Graff Racing	(Switzerland) Luis Sanjuan (Switzerland) Théo Vaucher	Ligier JS P320	MI	11	+13.902 s
16	LMP3	40	(France) Graff Racing	(Switzerland) Luis Sanjuan (Switzerland) Théo Vaucher	Nissan 5.6 L V8	MI	11	+13.902 s
17	LMP3	22	(United Kingdom) United Autosports	(Australia) Andres Latorre (Australia) Garnet Patterson	Ligier JS P320	MI	11	+14.004 s
17	LMP3	22	(United Kingdom) United Autosports	(Australia) Andres Latorre (Australia) Garnet Patterson	Nissan 5.6 L V8	MI	11	+14.004 s
18	LMP3	21	(United Kingdom) United Autosports	(United States) James McGuire (United Kingdom) Guy Smith	Ligier JS P320	MI	11	+15.970 s
18	LMP3	21	(United Kingdom) United Autosports	(United States) James McGuire (United Kingdom) Guy Smith	Nissan 5.6 L V8	MI	11	+15.970 s
19	LMP3	53	(United Kingdom) RLR MSport	(Chile) Nico Pino (United Kingdom) Martin Rich	Ligier JS P320	MI	11	+18.562 s
19	LMP3	53	(United Kingdom) RLR MSport	(Chile) Nico Pino (United Kingdom) Martin Rich	Nissan 5.6 L V8	MI	11	+18.562 s
20	LMP3	54	(Poland) Inter Europol Competition	(France) Noam Abramczyk (United States) Don Yount	Ligier JS P320	MI	11	+19.607 s
20	LMP3	54	(Poland) Inter Europol Competition	(France) Noam Abramczyk (United States) Don Yount	Nissan 5.6 L V8	MI	11	+19.607 s
21	LMP3	15	(United Kingdom) RLR MSport	(Austria) Horst Felbermayr Jr. (United Kingdom) Alex Kapadia	Ligier JS P320	MI	11	+21.504 s
21	LMP3	15	(United Kingdom) RLR MSport	(Austria) Horst Felbermayr Jr. (United Kingdom) Alex Kapadia	Nissan 5.6 L V8	MI	11	+21.504 s
22	LMP3	13	(Switzerland) Haegeli by T2 Racing	(Germany) Marc Basseng (Switzerland) Pieder Decurtins	Duqueine M30 – D08	MI	11	+22.162 s
22	LMP3	13	(Switzerland) Haegeli by T2 Racing	(Germany) Marc Basseng (Switzerland) Pieder Decurtins	Nissan 5.6 L V8	MI	11	+22.162 s
23	LMP3	23	(United Kingdom) United Autosports	(United Kingdom) Wayne Boyd (United States) John Schauerman	Ligier JS P320	MI	11	+22.186 s
23	LMP3	23	(United Kingdom) United Autosports	(United Kingdom) Wayne Boyd (United States) John Schauerman	Nissan 5.6 L V8	MI	11	+22.186 s
24	LMP3	2	(United Kingdom) United Autosports	(United Kingdom) Max Lynn (United Kingdom) Shaun Lynn	Ligier JS P320	MI	11	+26.395 s
24	LMP3	2	(United Kingdom) United Autosports	(United Kingdom) Max Lynn (United Kingdom) Shaun Lynn	Nissan 5.6 L V8	MI	11	+26.395 s
25	LMP3	9	(Austria) AT Racing Team	(Austria) Alexander Talkanitsa Jr. (Austria) Alexander Talkanitsa Sr.	Ligier JS P320	MI	11	+26.567 s
25	LMP3	9	(Austria) AT Racing Team	(Austria) Alexander Talkanitsa Jr. (Austria) Alexander Talkanitsa Sr.	Nissan 5.6 L V8	MI	11	+26.567 s
26	GT3	55	(Denmark) GMB Motorsport	(Denmark) Kasper H. Jensen (Denmark) Kristian Poulsen	Honda NSX GT3 Evo22	MI	11	+28.470 s
26	GT3	55	(Denmark) GMB Motorsport	(Denmark) Kasper H. Jensen (Denmark) Kristian Poulsen	Honda 3.5 L Turbo V6	MI	11	+28.470 s
27	GT3	34	(Belgium) Belgian Audi Club Team WRT	(France) Arnold Robin (France) Maxime Robin	Audi R8 LMS Evo II	MI	11	+29.131 s
27	GT3	34	(Belgium) Belgian Audi Club Team WRT	(France) Arnold Robin (France) Maxime Robin	Audi 5.2 L V10	MI	11	+29.131 s
28	GT3	99	(Spain) Bullitt Racing	(France) Valentin Hasse-Clot (United Kingdom) Stephen Pattrick	Aston Martin Vantage GT3	MI	11	+29.971 s
28	GT3	99	(Spain) Bullitt Racing	(France) Valentin Hasse-Clot (United Kingdom) Stephen Pattrick	Aston Martin 4.0 L Turbo V8	MI	11	+29.971 s
29	GT3	46	(Italy) Ebimotors	(Italy) Fabio Babini (Italy) Emanuele Busnelli	Porsche 911 GT3 R	MI	11	+31.908 s
29	GT3	46	(Italy) Ebimotors	(Italy) Fabio Babini (Italy) Emanuele Busnelli	Porsche 4.0 L Flat-6	MI	11	+31.908 s
30	LMP3	43	(Switzerland) Racing Spirit of Léman	(United Kingdom) Josh Skelton (France) Jacques Wolff	Ligier JS P320	MI	11	+32.522 s
30	LMP3	43	(Switzerland) Racing Spirit of Léman	(United Kingdom) Josh Skelton (France) Jacques Wolff	Nissan 5.6 L V8	MI	11	+32.522 s
31	GT3	56	(Italy) Ebimotors	(Italy) Max Busnelli (Italy) Paolo Venerosi Pesciolini	Porsche 911 GT3 R	MI	11	+37.586 s
31	GT3	56	(Italy) Ebimotors	(Italy) Max Busnelli (Italy) Paolo Venerosi Pesciolini	Porsche 4.0 L Flat-6	MI	11	+37.586 s
32	GT3	52	(Switzerland) Spirit of Race	(France) Hugo Delacour (Monaco) Cédric Sbirrazzuoli	Ferrari 488 GT3	MI	11	+38.007 s
32	GT3	52	(Switzerland) Spirit of Race	(France) Hugo Delacour (Monaco) Cédric Sbirrazzuoli	Ferrari F154CB 3.9 L Turbo V8	MI	11	+38.007 s
32	GT3	88	(Denmark) GMB Motorsport	(Denmark) Lars Engelbreckt Pedersen (Denmark) Mikkel O. Pedersen	Honda NSX GT3 Evo22	MI	11	+1:08.410
32	GT3	88	(Denmark) GMB Motorsport	(Denmark) Lars Engelbreckt Pedersen (Denmark) Mikkel O. Pedersen	Honda 3.5 L Turbo V6	MI	11	+1:08.410
34	GT3	19	(Germany) Leipert Motorsport	(United States) Gregg Gorski (United States) Gerhard Watzinger	Lamborghini Huracán GT3 Evo	MI	11	+1:28.088
34	GT3	19	(Germany) Leipert Motorsport	(United States) Gregg Gorski (United States) Gerhard Watzinger	Lamborghini 5.2 L V10	MI	11	+1:28.088
35	LMP3	57	(France) Graff Racing	(United Kingdom) Ryan Harper-Ellam (Switzerland) Stephan Rupp	Ligier JS P320	MI	10	+1 Lap
35	LMP3	57	(France) Graff Racing	(United Kingdom) Ryan Harper-Ellam (Switzerland) Stephan Rupp	Nissan 5.6 L V8	MI	10	+1 Lap
36	LMP3	31	(Italy) AF Corse	(United States) Trenton Estep (United States) Mark Kvamme	Ligier JS P320	MI	10	+1 Lap
36	LMP3	31	(Italy) AF Corse	(United States) Trenton Estep (United States) Mark Kvamme	Nissan 5.6 L V8	MI	10	+1 Lap
37	LMP3	66	(Germany) Rinaldi Racing	(Germany) Daniel Keilwitz (Germany) Steve Parrow	Duqueine M30 – D08	MI	10	+1 Lap
37	LMP3	66	(Germany) Rinaldi Racing	(Germany) Daniel Keilwitz (Germany) Steve Parrow	Nissan 5.6 L V8	MI	10	+1 Lap
38	INV	24	(France) H24 Racing	(Monaco) Stéphane Richelmi	H24	MI	9	+2 Laps
DNF	LMP3	27	(United Kingdom) 24-7 Motorsport	(United Kingdom) Andrew Ferguson (United Kingdom) Jeremy Ferguson	Ligier JS P320	MI	10	
DNF	LMP3	27	(United Kingdom) 24-7 Motorsport	(United Kingdom) Andrew Ferguson (United Kingdom) Jeremy Ferguson	Nissan 5.6 L V8	MI	10	
DNF	LMP3	30	(Germany) Frikadelli Racing Team	(Germany) Klaus Abbelen (Germany) Felipe Fernández Laser	Ligier JS P320	MI	6	
DNF	LMP3	30	(Germany) Frikadelli Racing Team	(Germany) Klaus Abbelen (Germany) Felipe Fernández Laser	Nissan 5.6 L V8	MI	6	
DNF	LMP3	73	(Italy) TS Corse	(Chile) Benjamín Hites (Italy) Pietro Peccenini	Duqueine M30 – D08	MI	6	
DNF	LMP3	73	(Italy) TS Corse	(Chile) Benjamín Hites (Italy) Pietro Peccenini	Nissan 5.6 L V8	MI	6	
DNF	LMP3	17	(France) IDEC Sport	(France) Patrice Lafargue (France) Dino Lunardi	Ligier JS P320	MI	5	
DNF	LMP3	17	(France) IDEC Sport	(France) Patrice Lafargue (France) Dino Lunardi	Nissan 5.6 L V8	MI	5	
DNF	LMP3	6	(France) ANS Motorsport	(Switzerland) Jonathan Brossard (France) Nicholas Schatz	Ligier JS P320	MI	4	
DNF	LMP3	6	(France) ANS Motorsport	(Switzerland) Jonathan Brossard (France) Nicholas Schatz	Nissan 5.6 L V8	MI	4	
DNF	LMP3	33	(Poland) Team Virage	(United States) Rob Hodes (Guatemala) Ian Rodríguez	Ligier JS P320	MI	4	
DNF	LMP3	33	(Poland) Team Virage	(United States) Rob Hodes (Guatemala) Ian Rodríguez	Nissan 5.6 L V8	MI	4	
DNF	GT3	61	(Italy) AF Corse	(Switzerland) Gino Forgione (Italy) Andrea Montermini	Ferrari 488 GT3	MI	4	
DNF	GT3	61	(Italy) AF Corse	(Switzerland) Gino Forgione (Italy) Andrea Montermini	Ferrari F154CB 3.9 L Turbo V8	MI	4	
DNF	GT3	44	(Denmark) GMB Motorsport	(Denmark) Gustav Birch (Denmark) Jens Reno Møller	Honda NSX GT3 Evo22	MI	4	
DNF	GT3	44	(Denmark) GMB Motorsport	(Denmark) Gustav Birch (Denmark) Jens Reno Møller	Honda 3.5 L Turbo V6	MI	4	
DNF	LMP3	3	(Luxembourg) DKR Engineering	(United States) Jon Brownson (Germany) Laurents Hörr	Duqueine M30 – D08	MI	2	
DNF	LMP3	3	(Luxembourg) DKR Engineering	(United States) Jon Brownson (Germany) Laurents Hörr	Nissan 5.6 L V8	MI	2	
