= Berkay Besler =

Turkish racing driver

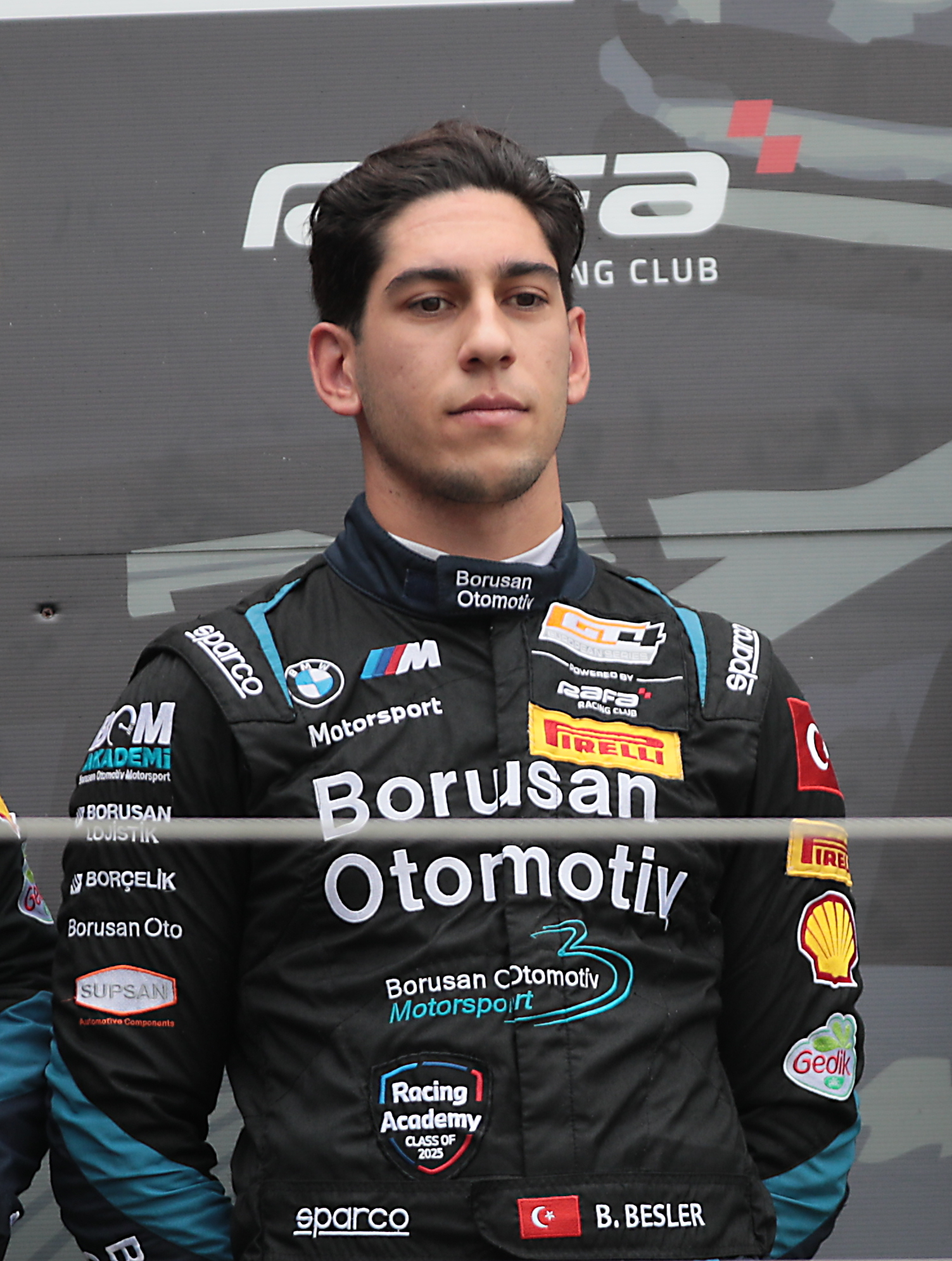
- Besler in 2025
- Nationality: (Turkey) Turkish
- Born: 19 February 1999 (age 27) İnegöl, Bursa, Turkey
- Categorisation: FIA Silver

Berkay Besler (born 19 February 1999) is a Turkish racing driver competing internationally in the Porsche Supercup.

Besler was born in İnegöl, Bursa, Turkey on 19 February 1999. In 2019, he won his first Porsche GT3 Cup Challenge Middle East race at the Bahrain International Circuit. He then joined the Turkish racing team Borusan Otomotiv Motorsport to compete in the GT4 European Series driving a BMW M4 GT4 together with his teammate Cem Bölükbaşı.

== Racing record ==
=== Career summary ===
Season	Series	Team	Races	Wins	Poles	F/Laps	Podiums	Points	Position
2017	Renault Sport Clio Cup Italia	Essecorse	12	0	0	0	0	60	8th
2018	Porsche GT3 Cup Challenge Benelux	Toksport WRT	10	0	0	0	3	103	6th
2018-19	Porsche GT3 Cup Challenge Middle East		16	3	1	0	11	335	2nd
2019	Porsche Supercup	MRS GT-Racing	2	0	0	0	0	5	19th
2019	Porsche Carrera Cup Germany	Car Collection Motorsport	16	0	0	0	1	41.5	16th
2019	Porsche Super Sports Cup Germany - 5F	Toksport WRT	2	2	1	2	2	0	NC†
2019-20	Porsche Sprint Challenge Middle East		3	1	0	1	3	67	15th
2020	Porsche Supercup	Lechner Racing Middle East	2	0	0	0	0	0	NC†
2021	GT World Challenge Europe Endurance Cup	Toksport WRT							
2021	GT4 European Series - Silver	Borusan Otomotiv Motorsport	4	0	0	0	1	30	15th
2021	GT4 European Series - Pro-Am	Borusan Otomotiv Motorsport	4	0	0	0	1	44	11th
2022	GT4 European Series - Silver	Borusan Otomotiv Motorsport	12	0	0	1	3	108	5th
2022	Prototype Cup Germany	Toksport WRT	8	4	0	0	5	111.5	1st
2023	GT4 European Series - Silver	Borusan Otomotiv Motorsport	12	1	0	0	4	117	3rd
2024	GT4 European Series - Silver	Borusan Otomotiv Motorsport	12	1	0	0	3	89	6th
2025	GT4 European Series - Silver	Borusan Otomotiv Motorsport							
2025	ADAC GT4 Germany	FK Performance Motorsport							

† As Besler was a guest driver, he was ineligible to score points.

=== Complete GT4 European Series results ===
Year	Team	Car	1		2		3		4		5		6	Pos.	Pts
2021	Borusan Otomotiv Motorsport	BMW M4 GT4	(Italy); MNZ		(France); LEC		(Netherlands); ZAN		(Belgium); SPA		(Germany); NÜR		(Spain); BAR		
2021	Borusan Otomotiv Motorsport	BMW M4 GT4	10	4	DNS	DNS	9	14	DNS	DNS	7	14			
2023	Borusan Otomotiv Motorsport	BMW M4 GT4	(Italy); MNZ		(France); LEC		(Belgium); SPA		(Italy); MIS		(Germany); HOC		(Spain); BAR	3rd*	42*
2023	Borusan Otomotiv Motorsport	BMW M4 GT4	2	3	7	15								3rd*	42*

- * Season still in progress.
