= 2018 24 Hours of Nürburgring =

Endurance motor race in Germany

Nürburgring 24h track (Nordschleife+GP Circuit without Mercedes-Arena)

The 2018 ADAC Zurich 24 Hours of Nürburgring was the 46th running of the 24 Hours of Nürburgring. It took place over 10–13 May 2018.

The race was won by Frédéric Makowiecki, Patrick Pilet, Richard Lietz and Nick Tandy in the #912 Manthey Racing Porsche 911 GT3 R.

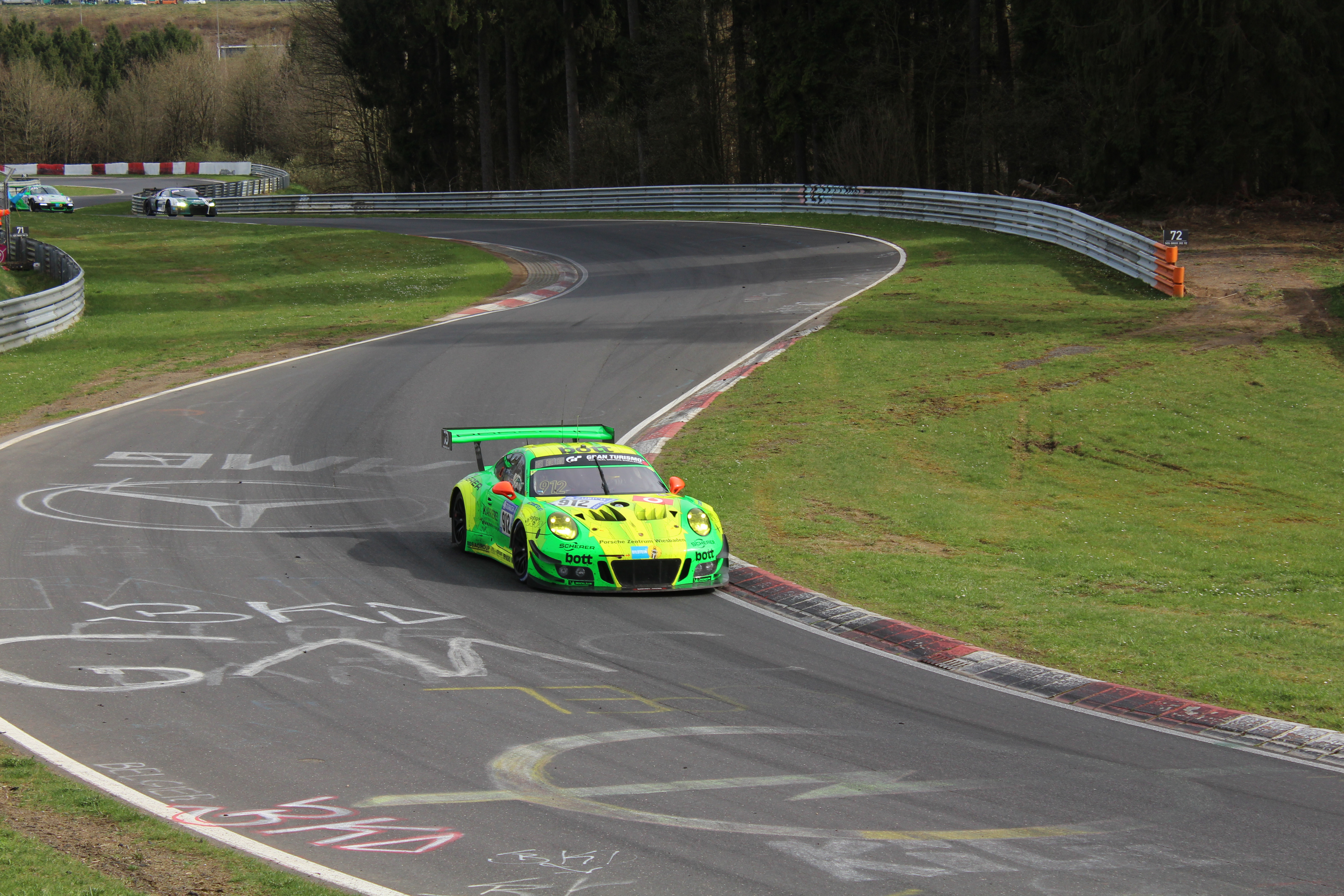
The race winning #912 Porsche 911 GT3 R from Manthey Racing.

== Race results ==
Class winners in bold.

Pos	Class	No.	Team	Drivers	Vehicle	Laps
1	**SP9**	**912**	**(Germany) Manthey Racing**	**(France) Frédéric Makowiecki (France) Patrick Pilet (Austria) Richard Lietz (United Kingdom) Nick Tandy**	**Porsche 911 GT3 R**	**135**
2	SP9	4	(Germany) Mercedes-AMG Team Black Falcon	(Germany) Maro Engel (United Kingdom) Adam Christodoulou (Germany) Manuel Metzger (Germany) Dirk Müller	Mercedes-AMG GT3	135
3	SP9	5	(Germany) Mercedes-AMG Team Black Falcon	(Netherlands) Yelmer Buurman (Germany) Thomas Jäger (Germany) Jan Seyffarth (Germany) Luca Stolz	Mercedes-AMG GT3	135
4	**SP9-LG**	**7**	**(United Kingdom) Aston Martin Racing**	**(Belgium) Maxime Martin (Denmark) Marco Sørensen (Denmark) Nicki Thiim (United Kingdom) Darren Turner**	**Aston Martin V12 Vantage GT3**	**134**
5	SP9	6	(Germany) Black Falcon	(Germany) Nico Bastian (Sweden) Erik Johansson (Germany) Hubert Haupt (Italy) Gabriele Piana	Mercedes-AMG GT3	134
6	SP9	1	(Germany) Audi Sport Team Land	(Germany) Christopher Mies (Germany) René Rast (South Africa) Kelvin van der Linde (South Africa) Sheldon van der Linde	Audi R8 LMS	133
7	SP9	3	(Germany) Audi Sport Team Phoenix	(Germany) Christopher Haase (Switzerland) Nico Müller (Germany) Frank Stippler (Belgium) Frédéric Vervisch	Audi R8 LMS	133
8	SP9	22	(Germany) Wochenspiegel Team Monschau	(Germany) Oliver Kainz (Germany) Jochen Krumbach (Germany) Christian Menzel	Ferrari 488 GT3	132
9	SP9	44	(Germany) Falken Motorsports	(Austria) Klaus Bachler (Germany) Sven Müller (Austria) Martin Ragginger (Germany) Dirk Werner	Porsche 911 GT3 R	132
10	SP9	16	(Germany) Landgraf Motorsport	(Germany) Sebastian Asch (Germany) Kenneth Heyer (Sweden) Edward Sandström (France) Tristan Vautier	Mercedes-AMG GT3	132
11	SP9	30	(Germany) Frikadelli Racing Team	(Germany) Lance David Arnold (Australia) Matt Campbell (Germany) Wolf Henzler (Germany) Alex Müller	Porsche 911 GT3 R	132
12	SP9	24	(Germany) Audi Sport Team BWT	(Germany) Christopher Haase (Switzerland) Nico Müller (Germany) Mike Rockenfeller (Germany) Markus Winkelhock	Audi R8 LMS	131
13	SP9	102	(Germany) BMW Team Schnitzer	(Brazil) Augusto Farfus (Germany) Christian Krognes (Finland) Markus Palttala (Germany) Fabian Schiller	BMW M6 GT3	131
14	SP9	25	(Germany) Team BWT Mücke Motorsport	(Switzerland) Marcel Fässler (Germany) Christer Jöns (Germany) Pierre Kaffer (Germany) Stefan Mücke	Audi R8 LMS	130
15	SP9	33	(Germany) Falken Motorsports	(United Kingdom) Peter Dumbreck (Netherlands) Stef Dusseldorp (Switzerland) Alexandre Imperatori (Germany) Jens Klingmann	BMW M6 GT3	130
16	SP9	2	(Germany) Gigaspeed Team Getspeed Performance	(Germany) Marek Böckmann (Luxembourg) Steve Jans (Germany) Lucas Luhr (Germany) Jan-Erik Slooten	Porsche 911 GT3 R	130
17	SP9	48	(Germany) Mercedes-AMG Team Mann Filter	(Netherlands) Indy Dontje (Germany) Maximilian Götz (Germany) Christian Hohenadel (Netherlands) Renger van der Zande	Mercedes-AMG GT3	129
18	SP9	12	(Germany) Manthey Racing	(Switzerland) Philipp Frommenwiler (Germany) Lars Kern (Germany) Otto Klohs (Norway) Dennis Olsen	Porsche 911 GT3 R	129
19	**SP-X**	**705**	**(United States) Scuderia Cameron Glickenhaus**	**(France) Franck Mailleux (Germany) Thomas Mutsch (Sweden) Andreas Simonsen (United States) Jeff Westphal**	**Scuderia Cameron Glickenhaus SCG 003C**	**129**
20	SP9	15	(Germany) Car Collection Motorsport	(Belgium) Adrien de Leener (Germany) Christopher Friedrich (Germany) Pierre Kaffer (Switzerland) Simon Trummer	Audi R8 LMS	129
21	SP9	17	(Germany) KÜS Team75 Bernhard	(Germany) Jörg Bergmeister (Denmark) Michael Christensen (Italy) Matteo Cairoli (Germany) André Lotterer	Porsche 911 GT3 R	128
22	**SP8T**	**190**	**(Macau) Mercedes-AMG Team Driving Academy**	**(United Kingdom) Jethro Bovington (Germany) Christian Gebhardt (Germany) Bernd Schneider (Germany) Patrick Simon**	**Mercedes-AMG GT3**	**127**
23	SP-X	35	(Germany) GTronix 360 Team mcchip	(Germany) Helko Hammel (Germany) Dieter Schmidtmann (Canada) Kuno Wittmer	Renault Sport R.S.01 GT3	127
24	**SP7**	**55**	**(Germany) Prosport-Performance**	**(United States) Charles Espenlaub (United States) Joe Foster (Netherlands) Xavier Maassen (United States) Charles Putman**	**Porsche 911 GT3 Cup**	**124**
25	SP7	58		(Germany) Peter Bonk (United Kingdom) Bill Cameron (United Kingdom) Tom Onslow-Cole	Porsche 991 GT3 Cup	123
26	**Cup-X**	**202**	**(Germany) Isert Motorsport**	**(Germany) Max Friedhoff (Germany) Volker Strycek (Austria) Ferdinand Stuck (Austria) Johannes Stuck**	**KTM X-Bow GT4**	**122**
27	**AT**	**320**	**(Germany) Care For Climate**	**(Germany) Axel Duffner (Germany) Daniel Schellhaas (Germany) Smudo (Germany) Thomas von Löwis of Menar**	**Porsche 911 GT3 Cup**	**122**
28	**Cup 3**	**302**	**(Belgium) Mühlner Motorsport**	**(Germany) Moritz Kranz (Germany) Tobias Müller (Germany) Timo Mölig (Germany) Michael Rebhan**	**Porsche Cayman GT4 Clubsport**	**122**
29	Cup 3	303	(Belgium) Mühlner Motorsport	(Germany) Moritz Kranz (Germany) Marcel Hoppe (Germany) Jürgen von Gartzen (Germany) Sebastian von Gartzen	Porsche Cayman GT4 Clubsport	122
30	SP7	61	(Germany) Team 9und11	(Germany) Georg Goder (Germany) Ralf Oehme (Germany) Tim Scheerbarth (Germany) Martin Schlüter	Porsche 991 GT3 Cup	122
31	SP7	57	(Germany) Gigaspeed Team GetSpeed Performance	(United States) Janine Hill (Netherlands) Duncan Huisman (Germany) Arno Klasen (United States) John Shoffner	Porsche 991 GT3 Cup	122
32	**TCR**	**178**	**(Finland) LMS Racing**	**(Finland) Antti Buri (Spain) Jordi Gené (Finland) Olli Kangas (Finland) Kari-Pekka Laaksonen**	**CUPRA León TCR**	**121**
33	AT	420	(Germany) Care For Climate	(Germany) Daniel Blickle (Republic of Ireland) Charlie Eastwood (Germany) Thomas Kiefer (Germany) Niklas Steinhaus	Porsche 911 GT3 Cup	120
34	**KL Cup**	**256**	**(Germany) SecuItal Sorg Rennsport**	**(Germany) Heiko Eichenberg (Austria) Torsten Kratz (Switzerland) Yannick Mettler (Estonia) Tristan Viidas**	**BMW M235i Racing**	**120**
35	TCR	831	(South Korea) Hyundai Motorsport N	(Germany) Andreas Gülden (Italy) Nicola Larini (Germany) Manuel Lauck (Germany) Peter Terting	Hyundai i30 N TCR	120
36	KL Cup	244	(Switzerland) Hofor Racing Powered by Bonk Motorsport	(Germany) Marc Ehret (Austria) Michael Fischer (Germany) Florian Nauman (Germany) Michael Schrey	BMW M235i Racing	120
37	Cup 3	236	(Germany) Teichmann Racing	(Luxembourg) Daniel Bohr (Germany) Thorsten Jung (Germany) Maik Rönnefarth (Germany) Hendrik von Danwitz	Porsche Cayman GT4 Clubsport	120
38	**SP8**	**46**	**(Germany) rent2Drive-Familia-racing**	**(Germany) David Ackermann (Russia) Dmitry Lukovnikov (Hungary) Walter Csaba (Germany) Jörg Wiskirchen**	**Porsche 991 GT3 Cup MR**	**120**
39	Cup-X	201	(Austria) True Racing	(Switzerland) Rahel Frey (Austria) Laura Kraihamer (South Africa) Naomi Schiff (Germany) Lena Strycek	KTM X-Bow GT4	119
40	KL Cup	240	(Germany) Pixum Team Adrenalin Motorsport	(Germany) Norbert Fischer (Austria) David Griessner (Germany) Christian Konnerth (Germany) Daniel Zils	BMW M235i Racing	119
41	KL Cup	242	(Germany) Pixum Team Adrenalin Motorsport	(Germany) Danny Brink (Germany) Yannich Fübrich (Germany) Christopher Rink (Germany) Philipp Leisen	BMW M235i Racing	119
42	SP8T	51	(Germany) Team Schirmer	(Germany) Uwe Ebertz (Germany) Philipp Göschel (United Kingdom) Moran Gott (Germany) Frank Weishar	BMW M4	118
43	TCR	172	(Germany) Bonk Motorsport	(Germany) Hermann Bock (Germany) Maximilian Partl (Germany) Rainer Partl (Germany) Volker Piepmeyer	Audi RS 3 LMS TCR	117
44	Cup 3	306		(Germany) Karsten Krämer (Germany) Heiko Tönges (Russia) Alexey Veremenko (Germany) Fred Wißkirchen	Porsche Cayman GT4 Clubsport	117
45	SP8	42	(Germany) Ring Racing with Novel	(Germany) Dominik Farnbacher (Germany) Mario Farnbacher (Japan) Kota Sasaki (Japan) Hiroki Yoshimoto	Lexus RCF	117
46	SP8	43	(Germany) Novel Racing	(Japan) Tohijiro Azuma (Japan) Yoshinobu Koyama (Japan) Taketoshi Matsui (Japan) Kota Sasaki	Lexus ISF CCS-R	117
47	SP8	77		(Switzerland) Urs Bressan (Germany) Jürgen Gagstatter (Germany) Tobias Neuser (Germany) Stephan Wölflick	Ford Mustang GT WR	117
48	SP8T	38	(Germany) Pixum Team Adrenalin Motorsport	(China) Xiao Gang Gu (Estonia) Erki Koldits (China) Fei Li (Norway) Einar Thorsen	BMW M4	117
49	Cup 3	301	(Germany) Teichmann Racing	(Germany) Uwe Flaig (Germany) Harald Geisselhart (Germany) "Maximilian" (Norway) Torleif Nytröen	Porsche Cayman GT4 Clubsport	117
50	**SP6**	**65**	**(Germany) Proom Racing**	**(Germany) Michael Grassl (Australia) Rob Thomson (Germany) Achim Wawer (Germany) Volker Wawer**	**Porsche Cayman**	**116**
51	**SP10**	**66**	**(Germany) Black Falcon Team Identica**	**(United States) Carlos Gomez (Germany) Stefan Karg (Germany) Fidel Lieb (Germany) Kim-Luis Schramm**	**Mercedes-AMG GT4**	**116**
52	SP8T	53	(Germany) Team Schirmer	(Germany) Hans-Martin Gass (Germany) Heiko Hahn (Germany) Christlan Heuchemer (Germany) Thomas Heuchemer	BMW M2	115
53	Cup 3	309	(Germany) Team Mathol Racing e.V.	(Australia) Angus Chapel (Germany) Henning Cramer (Germany) Bernhard Henzel (Germany) Immanuel Vinke	Porsche Cayman GT4 Clubsport	115
54	SP6	79	(Switzerland) Hofor-Racing	(Switzerland) Roland Eggimann (Netherlands) Christiaan Frankenhout (Switzerland) Martin Kroll (Germany) Bernd Küpper	BMW M3 CSL	114
55	KL Cup	241	(Germany) Pixum Team Adrenalin Motorsport	(Italy) Alessandro Cremascoli (Germany) Stefan Kruse (Germany) Christian Müller (Germany) Ralph-Peter Rink	BMW M235i Racing	114
56	SP9	14	(Germany) Car Collection Motorsport	(Germany) Stefan Aust (Germany) Christian Bollrath (Germany) Ronnie Saurenmann (Germany) Peter Schmidt	Audi R8 LMS	114
57	**V6**	**138**	**(Germany) Black Falcon Team TMD Friction**	**(Germany) Alaxander Böhm (Germany) Stephan Köhler (Germany) Axel König (Germany) Norbert Schneider**	**Porsche 991 Carrera**	**113**
58	TCR	830	(South Korea) Hyundai Motorsport N	(South Korea) Jae-Kyun Kim (South Korea) Byunghui Kang (Germany) Guido Naumann (Germany) Moritz Oestreich	Hyundai i30 N TCR	113
59	Cup 3	307	(Germany) Team Mathol Racing e.V.	(Germany) Marc Keilwerth (Argentina) Marcos Adolfo Vazquez (Germany) Montana Montana (Germany) Wolfgang Weber	Porsche Cayman GT4 Clubsport	113
60	SP10	75	(Germany) Team Mathol Racing e.V.	(Germany) Jochen Herbst (Germany) Daniel Schwerteld (Germany) Domenico Solombrino (Germany) Christian Stingu	Mercedes-AMG GT4	113
61	KL Cup	246	(Germany) ADAC Team Weser Ems e.V.	(Switzerland) Fredy Barth (Germany) Stefan Branner (Germany) Bear Fozie (Germany) Andreas Schaflitzl	BMW M235i Racing	112
62	**SP3T**	**90**	**(Japan) Subaru Tecnica International**	**(Japan) Takuto Iguchi (Germany) Tim Schrick (Netherlands) Carlo van Dam (Japan) Hideki Yamauchi**	**Subaru WRX STi**	**112**
63	SP8	40	(United Kingdom) AMR Performance Centre	(United Kingdom) Jonathan Adam (United Kingdom) Peter Cate (United Kingdom) Jamie Chadwick (United Kingdom) Alex Lynn	Aston Martin Vantage V8	112
64	**V5**	**144**	**(Germany) Pixum Team Adrenalin Motorsport**	**(Spain) Carlos Arimon (Germany) Christian Büllesbach (Germany) Andreas Schettler (Greece) loannis Smyrlis**	**Porsche Cayman**	**111**
65	**SP3**	**126**	**(Germany) Avia Racing**	**(Germany) Stephan Epp (Germany) Gerrit Holthaus (Germany) Daniel Overbeck (Germany) Tobias Overbeck**	**Renault Clio RS Cup**	**111**
66	V5	151	(Germany) Team Schirmer	(Germany) Christopher Nigemeier (Germany) Sandro Petroziello (Germany) Sven Schädler (Germany) Stephen Stumpf	BMW E92 330i	111
67	V5	143	(Germany) Pixum Team Adrenalin Motorsport	(Germany) Daniel Attalah (Germany) Carsten Palluth (Germany) Christian Teichert (Switzerland) Urs Zünd	Porsche Cayman	110
68	**V4**	**155**	**(Germany) Securtal Sorg Rennsport**	**(Germany) Oliver Frisse (Germany) Torsten Kratz (Germany) Cedrik Totz (Germany) Kevin Totz**	**BMW 325i**	**109**
69	V4	160	(Germany) Securtal Sorg Rennsport	(Switzerland) Philipp Hagnauer (Germany) Olaf Meyer (United Kingdom) Joseph Moore	BMW 325i	109
70	SP3	114	(Germany) Manheller Racing	(Germany) Manuel Assmann (Germany) Moritz Gusenbauer (Germany) Werner Gusenbauer (Germany) Dale Lomas	Toyota GT86	109
71	KL Cup	238	(Germany) Walkenhorst Motorsport	(Germany) Dirk Groneck (Germany) Tim Groneck (Germany) Michael Mohr (New Zealand) Guy Stewart	BMW M235i Racing	109
72	Cup-X	203	(Germany) Isert Motorsport	(Germany) Arne Hoffmeister (Germany) Nils Jung (Germany) Robert Schröder (Germany) Florian Wolf	KTM X-Bow GT4	109
73	V5	149	(Germany) Porsche Club Ticino	(Denmark) Henrik Bollerslev (Germany) André Krumbach (Switzerland) Marco Timbal (Germany) Leonard Weiss	Porsche Cayman	109
74	V4	153	(Germany) Pixum Team Adrenalin Motorsport	(Germany) Guido Heinrich (Germany) Uwe Legermann (Germany) John Lee Schambony (Germany) Philipp Stahlschmidt	BMW E90 325i	108
75	V6	133	(Germany) Pixum Team Adrenalin Motorsport	(Austria) Gustav Engiähringer (Austria) Stefan Fuhrmann (Austria) Michael Hollerweger (Switzerland) Luca Veronelli	Porsche Cayman S	108
76	SP10	73	(Germany) Leutheuser Racing & Events	(Germany) Klaus-Dieter Frommer (Germany) Michael Hess (Germany) Bernd Klesschulte (France) Fabrice Reicher	BMW M4 GT4	108
77	**SP-Y**	**63**	**(Germany) Dörr Motorsport**	**(Germany) Marc Basseng (Germany) Manuel Lauck (Belgium) Nico Verdonck**	**Lamborghini Huracán Super Trofeo Evo**	**107**
78	V4	161	(Germany) Securtal Sorg Rennsport	(Turkey) Emir Asari (Germany) Christian Andreas Franz (Germany) Nicolas Griebner (Germany) Jan von Kiedrowski	BMW 325i	106
79	KL Cup	239	(Germany) Leutheuser Racing & Events	(Germany) Ralf Goral (Germany) Uwe Mallwitz (Austria) Richard Purtscher (Germany) Patrick Steuer	BMW M235i Racing	106
80	KL Cup	243	(Germany) Pixum Team Adrenalin Motorsport	(Sweden) Thomas Henriksson (Germany) Michael Klotz (Luxembourg) Charles Oakes (Netherlands) Marco van Ramshorst	BMW M235i Racing	106
81	SP3	115	(Japan) TMG United	(Germany) Adrian Brusius (Germany) Alex Fielenbach (Germany) Lars Peucker (Denmark) Oskar Sandberg	Toyota GT86	105
82	SP7	59	(Germany) Gigaspeed Team GetSpeed Performance	(Germany) Ulrich Berg (Switzerland) Jean-Louis Hertenstein (Czech Republic) Milan Kodidek (Germany) "Max"	Porsche 991 GT3 Cup	105
83	SP6	78	(Switzerland) Hofor-Racing	(Switzerland) Chantal Kroll (Switzerland) Martin Kroll (Switzerland) Michael Kroll (Switzerland) Alexander Prinz	BMW M3 GTR	105
84	**V2T**	**165**	**(Germany) rent2Drive-Familia-racing**	**(Germany) Oliver Greven (Germany) Axel Jahn (Russia) Andrei Sidorenko (Germany) Lutz Wolzenburg**	**Renault Megane RS**	**105**
85	V6	137	(Germany) Team Mathol Racing e.V.	(Argentina) Roberto Fernando Falcon (Germany) Thorsten Held (Germany) Max Walter von Bär (Germany) Stephan Waldhausen	Porsche Cayman S	104
86	SP3	117	(Germany) Pit Lane — AMC Sankt Vi	(Belgium) "Brody" (Belgium) Jacques Derenne (Belgium) Oliver Muytjens (Germany) Harald Rettich	Toyota GT86	104
87	SP3	125		(Japan) Junichi Umemoto (Japan) Kouichi Okumura (United Arab Emirates) Nadir Zuhour	Renault Clio Cup	103
88	KL Cup	245	(Switzerland) Hofor Racing Powered by Bonk Motorsport	(Germany) Raphael Hundeborn (Japan) Ryusho Konishi (Germany) Thomas Leyherr (Germany) Joachim Nett	BMW M235i Racing	102
89	**SP4**	**325**	**(Germany) Scuderia Solagon**	**(Germany) Paul Martin Dose (Germany) Daniel Jolk (Germany) Carsten Meurer (Germany) Sebastian Schemmann**	**BMW 325i**	**102**
90	TCR	173	(Germany) Lubner Motorsport	(Germany) Michael Brüggenkamp (Finland) Hannu Luostarinen (Switzerland) Rudolf Rhyn (Germany) Thorsten Wolter	Opel Astra TCR	102
91	SP3	128		(Germany) Jan Focke (Germany) Harald Leppert (Germany) Alex Müller	Toyota GT86	100
92	SP3T	94	(Germany) MSC Sinzig	(Italy) Marco Ferraro (United States) Andreas Gabler (Germany) Knut Kluge (Germany) Stephan Kuhs	Volkswagen Golf GTI TCR	99
93	SP8T	49	(Germany) Securtal Sorg Rennsport	(Denmark) Niels Borum (New Zealand) Michael Eden (Denmark) Claus Gronning (New Zealand) Wayne Moore	BMW 335i	99
94	V4	156	(Germany) Manheller Racing	(Austria) Markus Fischer (Germany) Marcel Manheller (Japan) Yutaka Seki (Germany) Kurt Strubbe	BMW E90	97
95	SP4T	86	(Germany) MSC Sinzig	(Germany) Benjamin Decius (Germany) Achim Ewenz (Argentina) Eduardo Romanelli (Argentina) Jose Visir	VW Golf 5 R-Line GTI	97
96	**SP-Pro**	**56**	**(Japan) Toyota Gazoo Racing**	**(Japan) Naoya Gamou (Japan) Takamitsu Matsui (Japan) Yuichi Nakayama (Japan) Takeshi Tsuchiya**	**Lexus LC**	**97**
97	V5	147	(Switzerland) Hofor Racing	(United Kingdom) Marcos Burnett (United Kingdom) Simon Glenn (United Kingdom) Jody Halse (United Kingdom) Benjamin Lyons	BMW E36 M3	96
98	SP3	127		(Germany) Romeo Dr. Loewe (Germany) Anna Loewe (Germany) Reiner Thomas (Germany) Manfred Schmitz	BMW E36 318is	96
99	SP3	129	Frank Haack	(Monaco) Xavier Lamadrid, Jr. (Mexico) Xavier Lamadrid, Sr. (Switzerland) Nicolas Abril (Germany) Frank Haack	Renault Clio RS	93
100	SP-Y	69	(Germany) Dörr Motorsport	(Germany) Uwe Wächtler (Germany) Florian Scholze (United States) Dennis Trebing (Germany) Dierk Möller	Lamborghini Huracán Super Trofeo Evo	93
101		164		(Austria) Friedrich Rabensteiner (Germany) Uwe Stein (Germany) Ulrich Schmidt (Germany) Ralf Lammering	Opel Astra J OPC	92
102	SP8T	60	(Germany) Securtal Sorg Rennsport	(Germany) Dirk Adorf (Netherlands) Beitske Visser (Germany) Nico Menzel (Netherlands) Tom Coronel	BMW M4 GT4	92
103	SP3	119	(Germany) MSC Adenau	(Germany) Tobias Jung (Portugal) Carlos Antunes Tavares (Germany) Andreas Kunert (Switzerland) Herbert Schmidt	Opel Calibra TJ-R	91
104	AT	109		(Germany) Ralph Caba (Germany) Volker Lange (Germany) Oliver Sprungmann (Germany) Patrick Brenndörfer	Ford Mustang GT	85
105	SP4	130		(Italy) Mauro Simoncini (Switzerland) Roberto Barin (Switzerland) Simone Barin (Italy) Bruno Barbaro	BMW 325 CI Coupe	79
106	SP3T	92		(Luxembourg) Mike Schmit (Germany) Michael Eichhorn (Germany) Patrick Rehs (Germany) Benjamin Weidner	Opel Astra OPC Cup	73
NC	SP3	123	Toyota Gazoo Racing Team Thailand	(Thailand) Nattavude Charoensukawattana (Thailand) Nattapong Hortongkum (Thailand) Manat Kulapalanont (Thailand) Suttipong Smittachartch	Toyota Corolla Altis GT	55
NC	SP7	50	(Germany) Porsche Club Ticino	(Switzerland) Nicola Bravetti (Switzerland) Ivan Jacoma (Switzerland) Ivan Reggiani (Switzerland) Giampaolo Tenchini	Porsche 997 GT3 Cup	48
NC	SP3	124	(Germany) MSC Adenau	(France) Patrick Boidron (Germany) Marcus Bulgrin (Germany) Danie Jenichen (Germany) Markus Weinstock	Opel Calibra TJ-R	43
DNF	Cup 3	310	(Germany) Schmickler Performance	(Germany) Winfried Assmann (Germany) Albert Egbert (Switzerland) Ivan Jacoma (Germany) Kai Riemer	Porsche Cayman GT4 Clubsport	107
DNF	TCR	175	(Germany) Prosport-Performance GmbH	(Germany) Christoph Breuer (Germany) Jürgen Nett (Germany) Markus Oestreich (Norway) Kenneth Oestvold	Audi RS3 LMS TCR	104
DNF	V5	148	(Germany) ADAC Team Weser Ems e.V.	(Germany) Fabian Finck (Germany) Jens Moetefindt (Luxembourg) Yann Munhowen	Porsche Cayman	104
DNF	SP10	74	(Germany) Walkenhorst Motorsport	(Germany) Thomas D. Hetzer (United Kingdom) Raoul Owens (Germany) Nicolas Pohler (Germany) Florian Weber	BMW M4 GT4	89
DNF	V6	136	(Germany) Team Mathol Racing e.V.	(Germany) Christian Eichner (Switzerland) Michael Imholz (Switzerland) Sebastian Schäfer (Switzerland) Rudiger Schicht	Porsche Cayman S	86
DNF	SP10	62	(Germany) Prosport-Performance GmbH	(Germany) Thomas Koll (Germany) Alexander Mies (Germany) Mike David Ortmann (Germany) Jörg Viebahn	Porsche Cayman PRO4 GT4	84
DNF	SP9	47	(Germany) Mercedes-AMG Team HTP Motorsport	(Austria) Dominik Baumann (Spain) Daniel Juncadella (Italy) Edoardo Mortara (Netherlands) Renger van der Zande	Mercedes-AMG GT3	83
DNF	SP9	98	(Germany) Rowe Racing	(United Kingdom) Tom Blomqvist (Netherlands) Nicky Catsburg (United States) John Edwards (United Kingdom) Richard Westbrook	BMW M6 GT3	82
DNF	KL Cup	255	(Germany) Securtal Sorg Rennsport	(Argentina) Carlos Federico Braga (Argentina) Alejandro Chawan (Argentina) Alfredo Tricarichi	BMW M235i Racing	77
DNF	SP3	122	Toyota Gazoo Racing Team Thailand	(Thailand) Grant Supaphongs (Thailand) Arthit Ruengsomboon (Taiwan) Chen Jian Hong	Toyota Corolla Altis GT	76
DNF	SP9	31	(Germany) Frikadelli Racing Team	(France) Mathieu Jaminet (Germany) Felipe Fernández Laser (Germany) Marco Seefried (Austria) Norbert Siedler	Porsche 911 GT3 R	69
DNF	SP8	39	(United Kingdom) AMR Performance Center	(Germany) Jens Dralle (Germany) Heinz Jurgen Kroner (New Zealand) Tony Richards (United States) David Thilenius	Aston Martin GT8	68
DNF	SP9	911	(Germany) Manthey Racing	(New Zealand) Earl Bamber (France) Romain Dumas (France) Kévin Estre (Belgium) Laurens Vanthoor	Porsche 911 GT3 R	66
DNF	TCR	177	(France) Team Altran Peugeot	(France) Olivier Baharian (France) Thierry Blaise (France) Guillaume Roman (France) Mathieu Sentis	Peugeot 308 Racing Cup	63
DNF	TCR	176	(Germany) FEV Racing	(Germany) Benedikt Gentgen (Germany) Andre Gies (Belgium) Wolfgang Haugg (Germany) "Rennsemmel"	CUPRA León TCR	63
DNF	SP8	41	(Germany) Phoenix Racing	(Netherlands) Milan Dontje (China) Xiaole He (Austria) Max Hofer (Denmark) Nicolaj Møller Madsen	Audi R8 LMS	62
DNF	V6	134	(Germany) Securtal Sorg Rennsport	(United States) Jim Briody (Italy) Alberto Carobbio (Italy) Ugo Vicenzi (Germany) Thomas Müller	Porsche Cayman S	62
DNF	KL Cup	248	(Germany) Team Manthol Racing e.V.	(Italy) Edoardo Bugane (Italy) Francesco Bugane (Italy) Francesco Merlini (Italy) Luca Sadun	BMW M235i Racing	61
DNF	SP9	11	(Germany) AutoArena Motorsport	(Germany) Patrick Assenheimer (Netherlands) Jeroen Bleekemolen (Italy) Raffaele Marciello (Austria) Clemens Schmid	Mercedes-AMG GT3	61
DNF	SP9	10	(Austria) Konrad Motorsport	(Germany) Christopher Brück (Italy) Michele Di Martino (Finland) Matias Henkola (Austria) Franz Konrad	Lamborghini Huracán GT3	54
DNF	AT	13	(Germany) skate-aid e.V.	(Germany) Bernd Albrecht (Germany) Titus Dittmann (Germany) Michael Lachmayer (Germany) Reinhard Schall	Chrysler Dodge Viper	53
DNF	TCR	174	(Germany) Lubner Motorsport	(Finland) Ilkka Kariste (Germany) Lukas Thiele (Switzerland) Roger Vögeli (Germany) Jens Wulf	Opel Astra TCR	38
DNF	SP9	8	(Belgium) Audi Sport Team WRT	(Netherlands) Robin Frijns (Germany) René Rast (Belgium) Dries Vanthoor (South Africa) Kelvin van der Linde	Audi R8 LMS	36
DNF	Cup 3	308		(Germany) Joachim Günther (Germany) Thomas Herbst (Germany) Uwe Nittel (Germany) Josef Stengel	Porsche Cayman GT4 Clubsport	34
DNF	SP9 LG	100	(Germany) Walkenhorst Motorsport	(Germany) Rudi Adams (Germany) Peter Posavac (Germany) Alex Lambertz (Germany) Jörg Müller	BMW Z4 GT3	29
DNF	V5	146	(Germany) GTronix360 Team mcchip-dkr	(Japan) Kohei Fukuda (Germany) Georg Griesemann (Germany) Michael Mönch (Germany) Florian Quante	Porsche Cayman	27
DNF	KL Cup	253	(Germany) Securtal Sorg Rennsport	(United States) James Clay (United States) Tyler Cooke (United States) Cameron Evans (United Kingdom) Charlie Postins	BMW M235i Racing	25
DNF	SP9	99	(Germany) Rowe Racing	(United States) Connor De Phillippi (Finland) Jesse Krohn (United Kingdom) Alexander Sims (Germany) Martin Tomczyk	BMW M6 GT3	16
DNF	SP8T	52	(Germany) Team Schirmer	(Germany) Michael Funke (Germany) Dierk Heldmann (Germany) Jörg Müller (Germany) Rolf Scheibner	BMW M4	16
DNF	SP3	120	(Germany) Kissling Motorsport / Team Beckmann	(Germany) Olaf Beckmann (Germany) Peter Hass (Germany) Jürgen Schulten (Germany) Volker Strycek	Opel Manta (Flying Fox) GT	12
DNF	Cup 3	305	(Germany) Securtal Sorg Rennsport	(Germany) Emin Akata (Germany) Stefan Beyer (Germany) Christoph Hewer (Germany) Björn Simon	Porsche Cayman GT4 Clubsport	11
DNF	KL Cup	254	(Germany) Securtal Sorg Rennsport	(Finland) Juha Hannonen (Germany) Patrick Hinte (Finland) Jari Nuorama (Switzerland) Guido Wirtz	BMW M235i Racing	10
DNF	V3T	718	(Germany) Securtal Sorg Rennsport	(Germany) Jürgen Bretschneider (Germany) Steven Fürsch (Germany) Fabian Peitzmeier (Germany) Ralf Zensen	Porsche Cayman	6
DNF	SP3	116	(Germany) Pit Lane — AMC Sankt Vi	(Belgium) Jacques Castelein (Belgium) Kurt Dujardyn (Belgium) Oliver Muytjens	Toyota GT86	3
DNF	SP6	80	(Germany) rent2Drive-Familia-racing	(Italy) Andrea Sapino (Germany) Dirk Vleugels (Germany) Kevin Warum (Germany) Carsten Welschar	Porsche 997 GT3 Cup	2
DNS	SP3T	89	(Germany) MSC Sinzig e.V. im ADAC	(Russia) Artur Goroyan (Russia) Oleg Kvitka (Germany) Roland Waschkau	Audi TT RS	0
DNS	SP7	64	(Germany) Black Falcon Team TMD Friction	(Germany) Jurgen Bleul (Germany) Moritz Oberheim (Switzerland) "Takis" (Germany) Tim Zimmermann	Porsche 991 GT3 Cup MR	0
DNS	SP9	101	(Germany) Walkenhorst Motorsport	(Germany) Ralf Oeverhaus (France) Jordan Tresson (Germany) Henry Walkenhorst (Germany) Andreas Ziegler	BMW M6 GT3	0
DSQ	AT	91	(Germany) RLE International	(Germany) Jens Ludmann (Germany) Patrick Prill (Germany) Steffen Schlichenmeier (Germany) Marcel Willert	Ford Focus	0
DSQ	KL Cup	247	(Germany) ADAC Team Weser Ems e.V.	(Germany) Martin Kaemena (United Kingdom) Ian Mitchell (Germany) Andreas Ott (Germany) Hans Wehrmann	BMW M235i Racing	0
DSQ	SP7	96	(Germany) www.clickversicherung.de Team	(Germany) Robin Chrzanowski (Germany) Kersten Jodexnis (New Zealand) Peter Scharmach (Germany) Marco Schelp	Porsche 991 GT3 Cup MR	0

== Bibliography ==
- Jörg-Richard Ufer & Tim Upietz. 24 Stunden Nürburgring Nordschleife 2018. Gruppe C Motorsport Verlag. ISBN 978-3-928540-95-7.
