= 2022 Prototype Cup Germany =

Series of car races

The 2022 Prototype Cup Germany was the first season of the series, with German automobile club ADAC securing exclusive rights in Germany for ACO-rules LMP3 class racing, and Creventic organizing and promoting the series. The races will be contested with Le Mans Prototype and Group CN cars.

== Calendar ==
2022 Prototype Cup Germany

Round		Circuit	Date	Supporting
1	R1	Circuit de Spa-Francorchamps, Stavelot, Liège, Belgium	22–24 April	24H GT Series; 24H TCE Series
1	R2	Circuit de Spa-Francorchamps, Stavelot, Liège, Belgium	22–24 April	24H GT Series; 24H TCE Series
2	R1	Nürburgring, Nürburg, Rhineland-Palatinate, Germany	15–17 July	European Truck Racing Championship
2	R2	Nürburgring, Nürburg, Rhineland-Palatinate, Germany	15–17 July	European Truck Racing Championship
3	R1	Lausitzring, Klettwitz, Brandenburg, Germany	19–21 August	ADAC GT Masters; ADAC TCR Germany Touring Car Championship; ADAC Formula 4 Championship; Porsche Carrera Cup Germany
3	R2	Lausitzring, Klettwitz, Brandenburg, Germany	19–21 August	ADAC GT Masters; ADAC TCR Germany Touring Car Championship; ADAC Formula 4 Championship; Porsche Carrera Cup Germany
4	R1	Hockenheimring, Hockenheim, Baden-Württemberg, Germany	21–23 October	ADAC GT Masters; ADAC GT4 Germany; ADAC TCR Germany Touring Car Championship; Porsche Carrera Cup Germany
4	R2	Hockenheimring, Hockenheim, Baden-Württemberg, Germany	21–23 October	ADAC GT Masters; ADAC GT4 Germany; ADAC TCR Germany Touring Car Championship; Porsche Carrera Cup Germany

== Teams and drivers ==
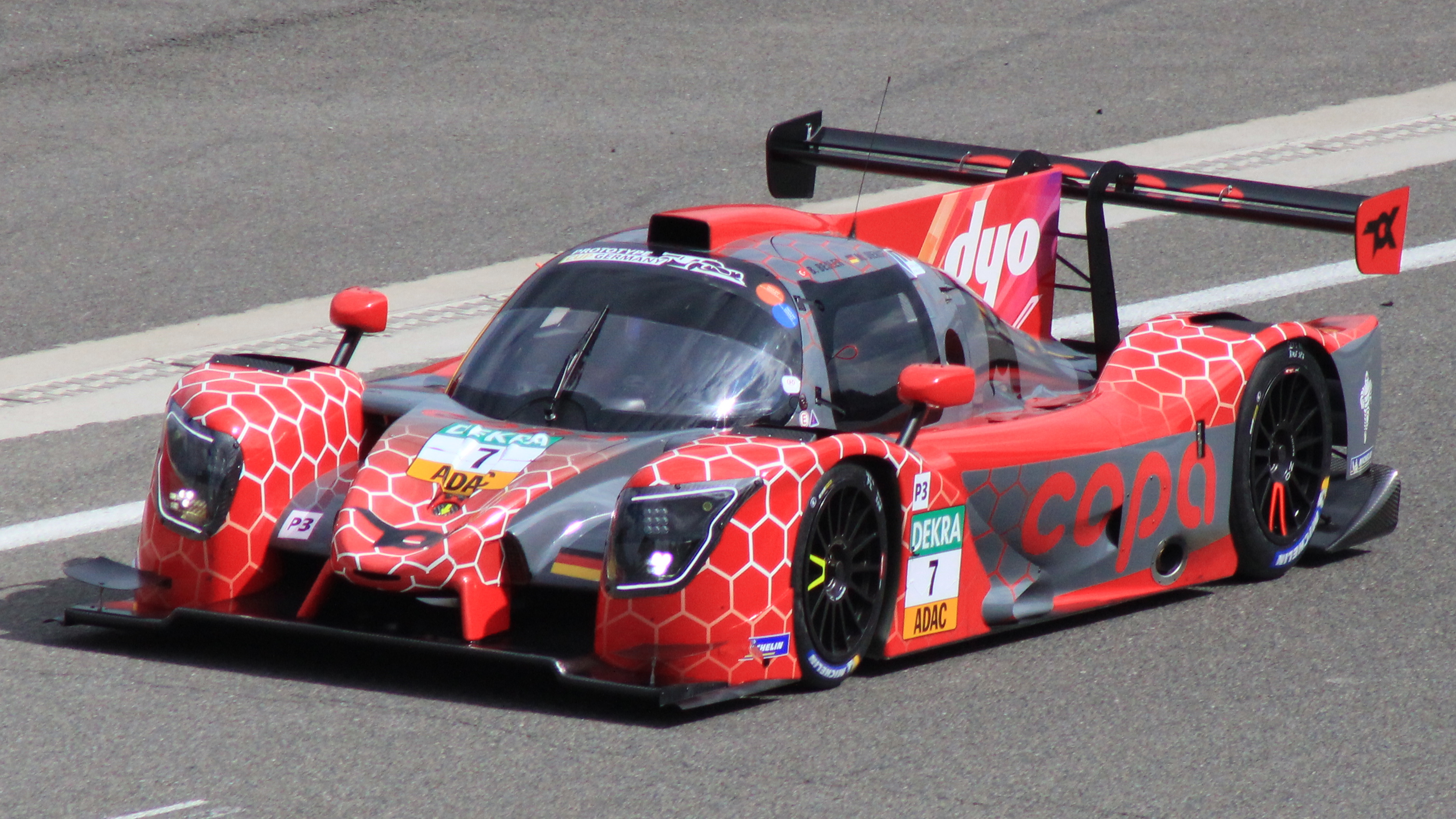
Berkay Besler and Marvin Dienst won the championship, driving for Toksport WRT.

All cars that competed were in the LMP3 class and used the 2020 spec Nissan VK56DE 5.6 L V8 engine and Michelin tyres.

Team	Car	No.	Drivers	Rounds
LMP3
(Austria) Konrad Motorsport	Ginetta G61-LT-P3	2	(Zimbabwe) Axcil Jefferies	All
(Austria) Konrad Motorsport	Ginetta G61-LT-P3	2	(Austria) Franz Konrad	1
(Austria) Konrad Motorsport	Ginetta G61-LT-P3	2	(Germany) Maximilian Hackländer	2–4
(Austria) Konrad Motorsport	Ginetta G61-LT-P3	22	(Austria) Franz Konrad	2
(Austria) Konrad Motorsport	Ginetta G61-LT-P3	22	(United States) Danny Soufi	3–4
(United Kingdom) Nielsen Racing	Duqueine M30 - D08	4	(United Kingdom) Matt Bell	1
(United Kingdom) Nielsen Racing	Duqueine M30 - D08	4	(United States) John Melsom	1
(Spain) Speed Factory Racing	Ligier JS P320	5	(Italy) Giorgio Rosa	1–2
(Spain) Speed Factory Racing	Ligier JS P320	5	(Spain) Santiago Concepción Serrano	1
(Spain) Speed Factory Racing	Ligier JS P320	5	(Ukraine) Aleksey Chuklin	2
(Germany) Toksport WRT	Ligier JS P320	7	(Turkey) Berkay Besler	All
(Germany) Toksport WRT	Ligier JS P320	7	(Germany) Marvin Dienst	All
(Germany) Wochenspiegel Team Monschau	Duqueine M30 - D08	11	(Germany) Torsten Kratz	1, 3–4
(Germany) Wochenspiegel Team Monschau	Duqueine M30 - D08	11	(Germany) Leonard Weiss	1, 3–4
(Luxembourg) Racing Experience	Duqueine M30 - D08	12	(Luxembourg) Gary Hauser	All
(Luxembourg) Racing Experience	Duqueine M30 - D08	12	(Germany) Sebastian von Gartzen	All
(Germany) MRS GT-Racing	Ligier JS P320	14	(Finland) Rory Penttinen	4
(Belgium) Mühlner Motorsport	Duqueine M30 - D08	21	(Germany) Matthias Lüthen	All
(Belgium) Mühlner Motorsport	Duqueine M30 - D08	21	(Germany) Donar Munding	All
(France) Pegasus Racing	Ligier JS P320	23	(France) Thibaut Ehrhart	2, 4
(France) Pegasus Racing	Ligier JS P320	23	(France) Julien Schell	4
(Germany) Reiter Engineering	Ligier JS P320	24	(Austria) Eike Angermayr	1
(Germany) Reiter Engineering	Ligier JS P320	24	(Austria) Florian Janits	1
(Germany) Reiter Engineering	Ligier JS P320	24	(Norway) Mads Siljehaug	2–3
(Germany) Reiter Engineering	Ligier JS P320	24	(United Kingdom) Freddie Hunt	2
(Germany) Reiter Engineering	Ligier JS P320	24	(Germany) Lion Dücker	4
(Germany) Reiter Engineering	Ligier JS P320	24	(Germany) Moritz Löhner	4
(Germany) Frikadelli Racing Team	Ligier JS P320	30	(Germany) Klaus Abbelen	2
(Germany) Frikadelli Racing Team	Ligier JS P320	30	(Germany) Felipe Fernández Laser	2
(Germany) Rinaldi Racing	Duqueine M30 - D08	33	(Colombia) Óscar Tunjo	2–4
(Germany) Rinaldi Racing	Duqueine M30 - D08	33	(Ecuador) Mateo Villagómez	2–3
(Germany) Rinaldi Racing	Duqueine M30 - D08	33	(Australia) Martin Berry	4
(Slovakia) ARC Bratislava	Ligier JS P320	44	(Slovakia) Miro Konôpka	4
(Slovakia) ARC Bratislava	Ligier JS P320	44	(Slovakia) Matej Konôpka	4
(Germany) Gebhardt Motorsport	Ginetta G61-LT-P3	70	(Germany) Jacob Erlbacher	All
(Germany) Gebhardt Motorsport	Ginetta G61-LT-P3	70	(Germany) Michael Herich	1–2, 4
(Germany) Gebhardt Motorsport	Ginetta G61-LT-P3	70	(United Kingdom) Michael Lyons	3
(Finland) Koiranen Kemppi Motorsport	Duqueine M30 - D08	72	(Sweden) Sebastian Arenram	All
(Finland) Koiranen Kemppi Motorsport	Duqueine M30 - D08	72	(Finland) Jesse Salmenautio	All
(Poland) Inter Europol Competition	Ligier JS P320	777	(Poland) Damian Ciosek	1
(Poland) Inter Europol Competition	Ligier JS P320	777	(United Kingdom) James Winslow	1

== Race results ==
Round		Circuit	Pole position	Winners
1	R1	(Belgium) Spa-Francorchamps	(Germany) No. 24 Reiter Engineering	(Germany) No. 7 Toksport WRT
1	R1	(Belgium) Spa-Francorchamps	(Austria) Eike Angermayr (Austria) Florian Janits	(Turkey) Berkay Besler (Germany) Marvin Dienst
1	R2	(Belgium) Spa-Francorchamps	(Germany) No. 7 Toksport WRT (Note: Matt Bell was quickest in qualifying in the No. 24 Nielsen Racing car, but the team was forced to start from the back of the grid following a penalty.)	(Germany) No. 7 Toksport WRT
1	R2	(Belgium) Spa-Francorchamps	(Turkey) Berkay Besler (Germany) Marvin Dienst	(Turkey) Berkay Besler (Germany) Marvin Dienst
2	R1	(Germany) Nürburgring	(Belgium) No. 21 Mühlner Motorsport	(Germany) No. 24 Reiter Engineering
2	R1	(Germany) Nürburgring	(Germany) Matthias Lüthen (Germany) Donar Munding	(United Kingdom) Freddie Hunt (Norway) Mads Siljehaug
2	R2	(Germany) Nürburgring	(Germany) No. 7 Toksport WRT	(Germany) No. 7 Toksport WRT
2	R2	(Germany) Nürburgring	(Turkey) Berkay Besler (Germany) Marvin Dienst	(Turkey) Berkay Besler (Germany) Marvin Dienst
3	R1	(Germany) Lausitzring	(Austria) No. 2 Konrad Motorsport	(Germany) No. 7 Toksport WRT
3	R1	(Germany) Lausitzring	(Germany) Maximilian Hackländer (Zimbabwe) Axcil Jefferies	(Turkey) Berkay Besler (Germany) Marvin Dienst
3	R2	(Germany) Lausitzring	(Germany) No. 7 Toksport WRT	(Belgium) No. 21 Mühlner Motorsport
3	R2	(Germany) Lausitzring	(Turkey) Berkay Besler (Germany) Marvin Dienst	(Germany) Matthias Lüthen (Germany) Donar Munding
4	R1	(Germany) Hockenheimring	(Belgium) No. 21 Mühlner Motorsport	(Germany) No. 11 Wochenspiegel Team Monschau
4	R1	(Germany) Hockenheimring	(Germany) Matthias Lüthen (Germany) Donar Munding	(Germany) Torsten Kratz (Germany) Leonard Weiss
4	R2	(Germany) Hockenheimring	(Germany) No. 11 Wochenspiegel Team Monschau	(Germany) No. 11 Wochenspiegel Team Monschau
4	R2	(Germany) Hockenheimring	(Germany) Torsten Kratz (Germany) Leonard Weiss	(Germany) Torsten Kratz (Germany) Leonard Weiss

=== Drivers' Championship ===
1st	2nd	3rd	4th	5th	6th	7th	8th	9th	10th	11th	12th	13th	14th	15th
25	20	16	13	11	10	9	8	7	6	5	4	3	2	1

Pos.	Driver	SPA (Belgium)		NÜR (Germany)		LAU (Germany) ‡		HOC (Germany)		Points
1	(Turkey) Berkay Besler (Germany) Marvin Dienst	1	1	Ret	1	1	3	Ret	4	111.5
2	(Germany) Torsten Kratz (Germany) Leonard Weiss	2	3			6	6	1	1	97
3	(Germany) Matthias Lüthen (Germany) Donar Munding	4	7	6	2	7	1	7	5	93
4	(Zimbabwe) Axcil Jefferies	7	6	2	4	2	Ret	2	Ret	82
5	(Luxembourg) Gary Hauser (Germany) Sebastian von Gartzen	5	5	5	6	3	4	Ret	3	79.5
6	(Colombia) Óscar Tunjo			4	5	4	2	8	6	63.5
7	(Germany) Maximilian Hackländer			2	4	2	Ret	2	Ret	63
8	(Germany) Jacob Erlbacher	8	8	Ret	8	8	6	6	7	55
9	(Germany) Michael Herich	8	8	Ret	8			6	7	46
10	(Ecuador) Mateo Villagómez			4	5	4	2			43.5
11	(Norway) Mads Siljehaug			1	3	WD	WD			41
11	(United Kingdom) Freddie Hunt			1	3					41
12	(Sweden) Sebastian Arenram (Finland) Jesse Salmenautio	Ret	9	Ret	8	6	Ret	4	Ret	36
13	(Poland) Damian Ciosek (United Kingdom) James Winslow	6	2							30
14	(Italy) Giorgio Rosa	Ret	4	8	10					30
15	(Germany) Lion Dücker (Germany) Moritz Löhner							5	7	22
16	(Australia) Martin Berry							8	6	20
17	(Ukraine) Aleksey Chuklin			8	10					17
18	(Austria) Eike Angermayr (Austria) Florian Janits	3	Ret							16
19	(Spain) Santiago Concepcion Serrano	Ret	4							13
20	(United Kingdom) Michael Lyons					8	6			9
Drivers ineligible to score points
	(Finland) Rory Penttinen							3	2	
	(Germany) Klaus Abbelen (Germany) Felipe Fernández Laser			3	7					
	(France) Thibaut Ehrhart			7	11			9	8	
	(United States) Danny Soufi					9	7	Ret	10	
	(France) Julien Schell							9	8	
	(United Kingdom) Matt Bell (United States) John Melsom	Ret	9							
	(Austria) Franz Konrad	WD	WD	WD	WD					
	(Slovakia) Miro Konôpka (Slovakia) Matej Konôpka							WD	WD	
Pos.	Driver	SPA (Belgium)		NÜR (Germany)		LAU (Germany) ‡		HOC (Germany)		Points

Notes:

- ‡ – Half points were awarded at the Lausitzring races.

== See also ==
- 24H Series
