= Duqueine D08 =

French sports car prototype

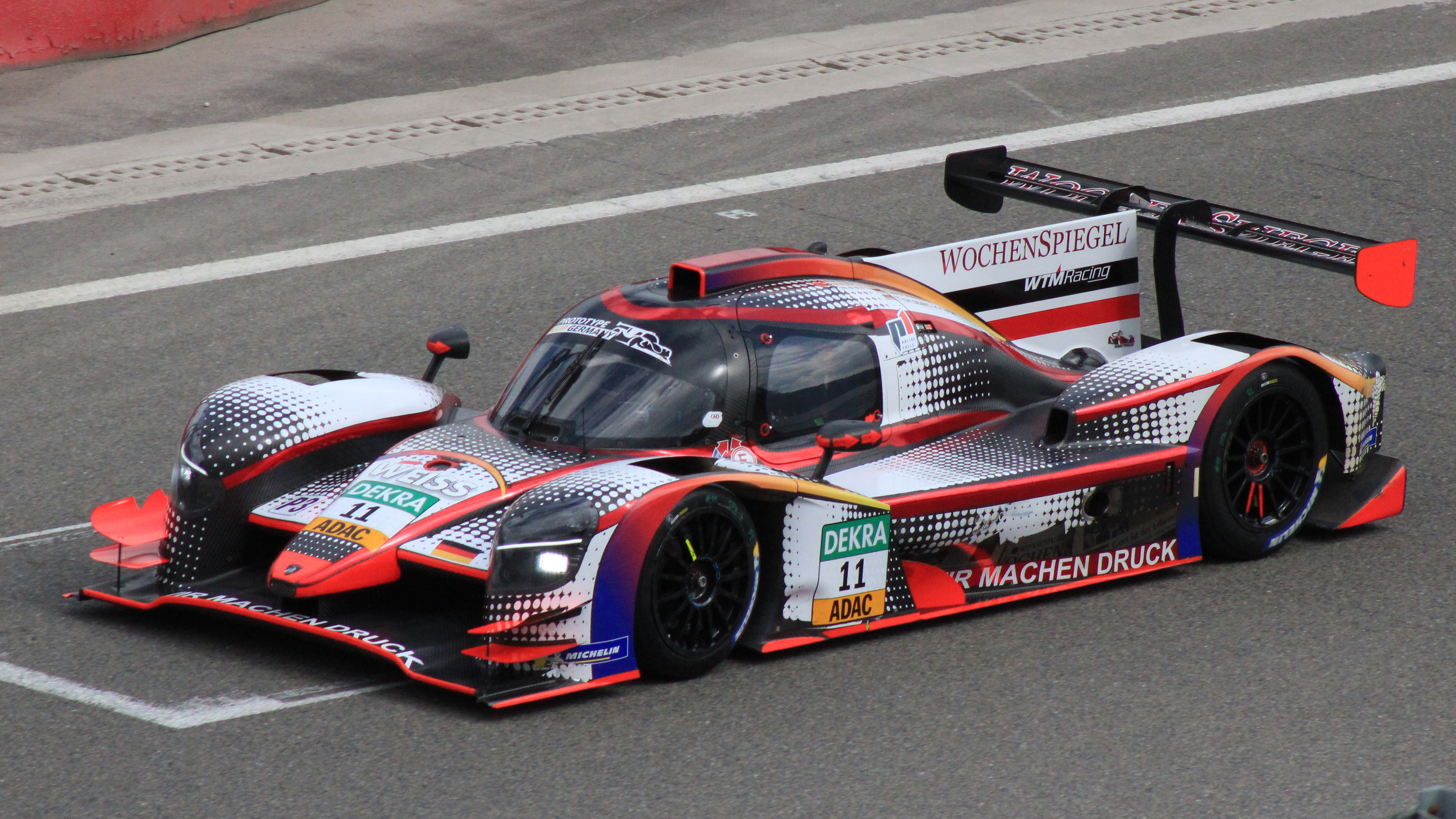
- The No. 11 D08 of Wochenspiegel Team Monschau during the 2022 Prototype Cup Germany at Circuit de Spa-Francorchamps
- Category: LMP3
- Constructor: Duqueine Engineering
- Designer: Olivier Miriel
- Predecessor: Norma M30
- Successor: Duqueine D09

Technical specifications
- Chassis: Carbon Monocoque
- Suspension (front): Double triangle, pushers - rockers, with 3-way shock absorbers, Adjustable anti-roll bars & 3rd adjustable element front and rear
- Suspension (rear): As Front
- Length: 4600mm
- Width: 1900mm
- Wheelbase: 2940mm
- Engine: Nissan VK56DE V8 5.6L
- Transmission: 6-speed sequential gearbox XTrac 1152
- Power: 455hp
- Weight: 960kg
- Fuel: Various
- Lubricants: Various
- Brakes: AP Racing ventilated discs, 6-pot caliper
- Tyres: Michelin

Competition history
- Debut: 2020 Le Mans Cup
Races	Wins	Titles
160	46	7
- Teams' Championships: 3 (2021 European Le Mans Series), (2020 Le Mans Cup), (2023 Prototype Cup Germany)
- Drivers' Championships: 4 (2021 European Le Mans Series), (2020 Le Mans Cup), (2022 Prototype Challenge), (2023 Prototype Cup Germany)

The Duqueine D08 is a Le Mans Prototype LMP3 built to ACO 2020 2nd Generation Le Mans Prototype LMP3 regulations. It was designed, and built by Duqueine Engineering, which bought out Norma Auto Concept. The car is the successor to the Norma M30. The car can be built from its predecessor, and is set to be eligible in a series of Championships worldwide, such as the European Le Mans Series, and the IMSA Prototype Challenge. While the car was launched on the weekend of the 2019 24 Hours of Le Mans, it was not physically seen until September 2019, with the car at Le Mans being a repainted M30.

== Developmental history ==
On 23 May 2018, the Automobile Club de I'Ouest announced a brief outline for the 2020 Generation 2 Le Mans Prototype 3 (LMP3) regulations, alongside new chassis models from four approved manufacturers – Onroak Automotive (Ligier), Duqueine Automotive (Norma), ADESS AG and Ginetta being announced as granted homologation for the new ruleset. On 7 February 2019, the ACO announced the new 2nd Generation Le Mans Prototype 3 (LMP3) regulations, with full implementation due by 2021, and with the cars being expected to be raced from 2020 to 2024.

Following the unveiling of the car in June 2019, the car underwent its shakedown at Le Pôle Mécanique Alès-Cévennes, with Romain Dumas, at the wheel, before testing moved to the Circuit Paul Ricard, with Nico Jamin at the wheel. David Droux was also involved in the tests. The tests were delayed, due to Duqueine being the last constructor to receive the new, upsized Nissan V8. The car had its public track debut during the post-season testing for the 2019 European Le Mans Series, at the Algarve International Circuit, in Portimão, alongside the Ligier JS P320.

Key differences between the Norma M30 and the Duqueine D08 include a re-designed front-splitter, modified side pods, a new engine cover and rear wing. Compared to the other 2020 LMP3 cars, the D08 was 10 kg heavier for the 2020 season, due to a weight penalty being imposed on the car as a result of a late submission of homologation paperwork.
