= Ligier JS P320 =

French sports car prototype

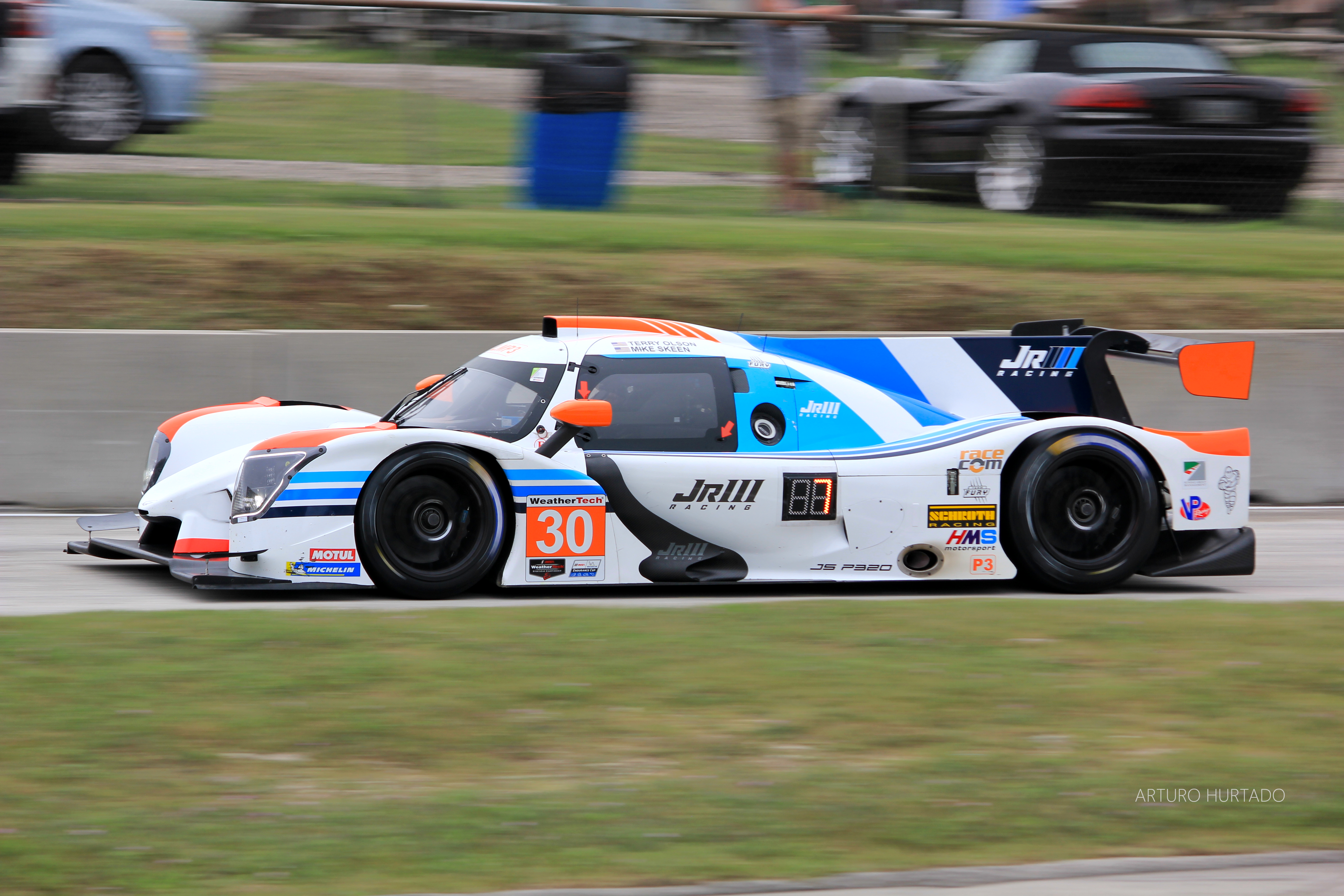
- The No. 30 JS P320 of Jr III Racing at the 2021 Sports Car Challenge at Mid-Ohio
- Category: LMP3
- Designer: Nicolas Clémençon
- Predecessor: Ligier JS P3
- Successor: Ligier JS P325

Technical specifications
- Chassis: Carbon Monocoque
- Suspension (front): Double wishbone, pushrod and 4-ways through-rod Ohlins TTX40 spring-dampers
- Suspension (rear): As Front
- Length: 4605mm
- Width: 1900mm
- Wheelbase: 2860mm
- Engine: Nissan VK56 V8 5.6L
- Transmission: 6-speed sequential gearbox XTrac 1152
- Power: 455hp
- Weight: 950kg
- Fuel: Various
- Lubricants: Various
- Brakes: 6 Piston Brembo 14in Steel Disks
- Tyres: Michelin; Ø18 OZ Racing Front: 12.5in Rear: 13in

Competition history
- Debut: 2020 Le Mans Cup
Races	Wins	Titles
160	114	36
- Teams' Championships: 17 (2020, 2022 European Le Mans Series), (2021–2022 Le Mans Cup), (2020–Ultimate Cup Series), (2021–2023 Asian Le Mans Series), (2021–2023 IMSA SportsCar Championship), (2021–2022 IMSA Prototype Challenge), (2022 Prototype Cup Germany), (2023 IMSA VP Racing SportsCar Challenge)
- Drivers' Championships: 19 (2020, 2022 European Le Mans Series), (2021–2022 Le Mans Cup), (2020–Ultimate Cup Series), (2021–2023 Asian Le Mans Series), (2021–2023 IMSA SportsCar Championship), (2021–2022 IMSA Prototype Challenge), (2022 Prototype Cup Germany), (2023 IMSA VP Racing SportsCar Challenge), (2023 Prototype Cup Germany Junior), (2023 Prototype Cup Germany Trophy)

The Ligier JS P320 is an LMP3 Le Mans Prototype. It was created by Onroak Automotive, and named in partnership with former French driver Guy Ligier. It was built to meet ACO Generation II LMP3 standards, and can be built through an update kit for its predecessor, the Ligier JS P3. The car is set to be eligible in a series of Championships worldwide, such as the Michelin Le Mans Cup, Prototype Cup Germany, Asian Le Mans Series, European Le Mans Series, IMSA Prototype Challenge and IMSA SportsCar Championship. The car was launched on 4 June 2019, and was the first Gen II LMP3 to be revealed.

== Developmental history ==
On 23 May 2018, the Automobile Club de I'Ouest announced a brief outline for the 2020 Generation 2 Le Mans Prototype 3 (LMP3) regulations, alongside chassis models from four manufacturers – Onroak Automotive (Ligier), Duqueine Automotive (Norma), ADESS AG and Ginetta being announced as granted homologation for the new ruleset. On 7 February 2019, the ACO announced the new 2nd Generation Le Mans Prototype 3 (LMP3) regulations, with full implementation due by 2021, and to be raced from 2020 to 2024.

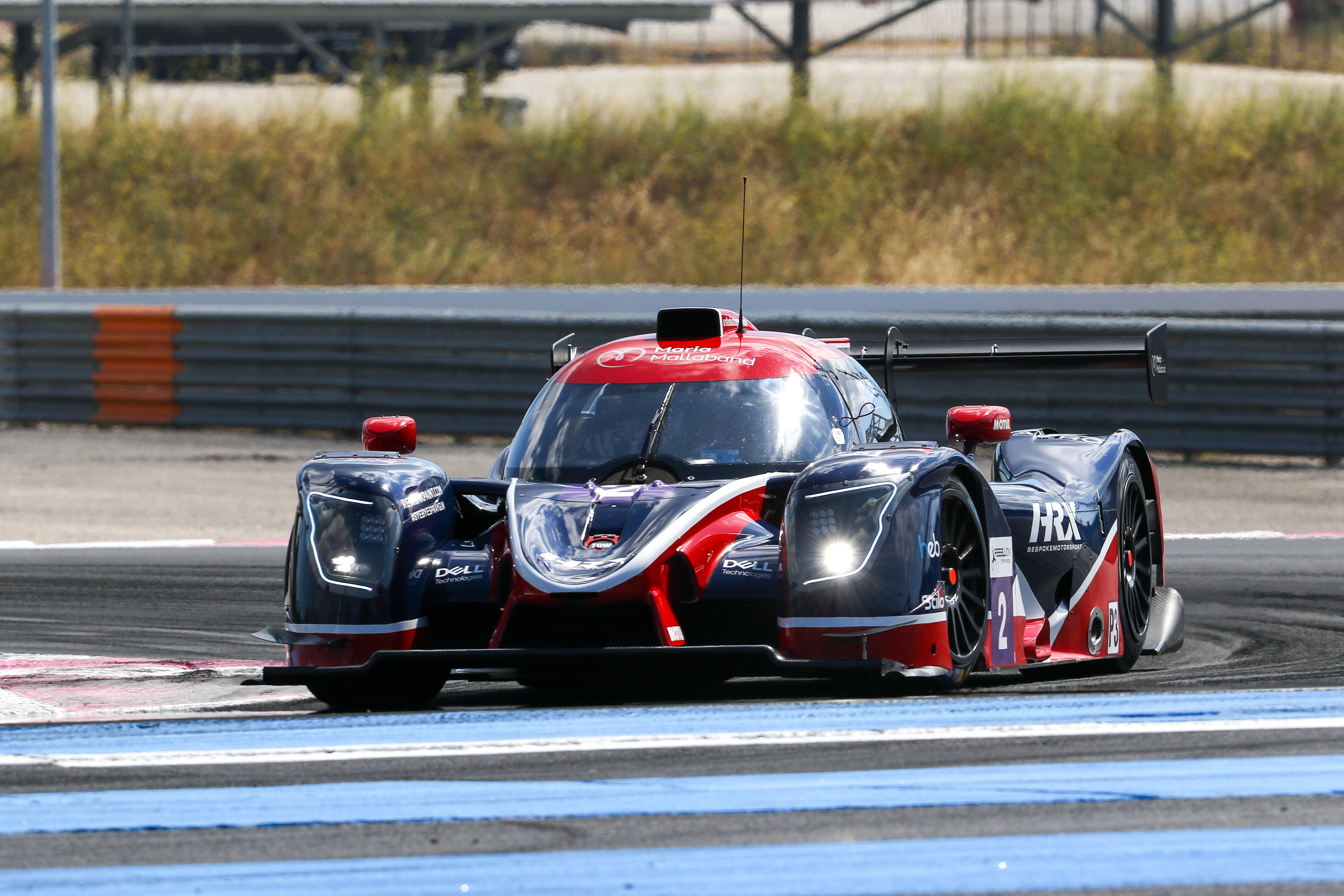
United Autosports Ligier JS P320 at 2020 4 Hours of Le Castellet

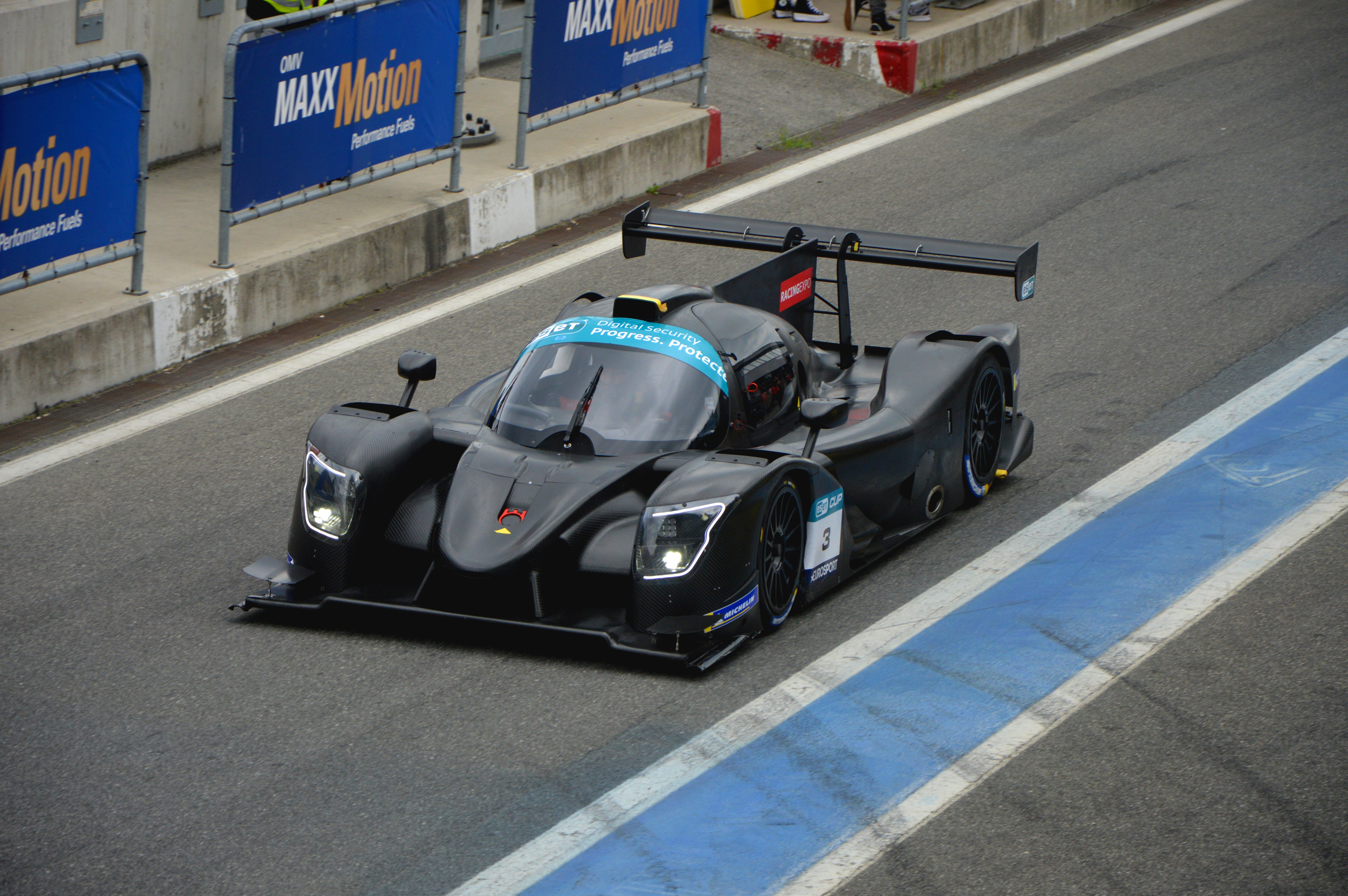
A JS P320 of Dan Skočdopole in its bare carbon state at the 2023 Grand Prix of Slovakia (ESET Cup Series).

Its predecessor, the Ligier JS P3 was released at a time when LMP3 cars were not intended to race on the Circuit de la Sarthe, and as such, the car was less focused on aerodynamic efficiency, leading to its lower top speed relative to later LMP3 cars, most notably the Norma M30. As a result, the design department of Ligier Automotive collaborated with Exa Corporation to optimise the car's aerodynamics to make it efficient on all circuits. The car features 95% new bodywork, Öhlins dampers and an adapted cooling system. With the new Generation 2 Regulations traction control could be added, and some safety-related changes were made to the driver's headrest and seat, along with Zylon side panels. A new engine, the Nissan VK56, was also introduced, with an additional 35 hp.

The car had its initial shakedown at the Circuit de Nevers Magny-Cours, ahead of its unveiling.

The car then made its racing debut at the Circuit Paul Ricard during the race weekend for both the opening rounds of the 2020 Le Mans Cup and the 2020 European Le Mans Series, at the 2020 4 Hours of Le Castellet. The field of twelve LMP3s featured eight Ligier JS P320 entrants.
