= 2026 24 Hours of Nürburgring =

Endurance motor race in Germany

(Germany) 24 Hours of Nurburgring 2026
Event information
- Round 2 of 5 in the 2026 Intercontinental GT Challenge
- Date: 14–17 May 2026
- Location: Nürburg, Rhineland-Palatinate, Germany
- Venue: Nürburgring
- Duration: 24 Hours

Results
- Laps completed: 156
- Distance: 3,958.968 km (2,459.989 mi)

Pole position
- Time: 8:11.123
- Team: (Germany) Red Bull Team Abt
- Drivers: (Germany) Luca Engstler

Winners
- Time: 24:05:27.664
- Team: (United States) Mercedes-AMG Team Ravenol
- Drivers: (Germany) Maro Engel (Belgium) Maxime Martin (Germany) Fabian Schiller (Germany) Luca Stolz

The 2026 Nürburgring 24 Hours (officially known as ADAC Ravenol 24h Race at the Nürburgring Nordschleife for sponsorship reasons) was the 54th running of the Nürburgring 24 Hours, which took place over 16–17 May 2026. The event was organised by the ADAC Nordrhein in a partnership with the SRO Motorsports Group that saw the event stage the second round of the 2026 Intercontinental GT Challenge. 161 cars were scheduled to run in the race, the largest entry list for the race since 2014. Of those 161 cars, only 159 started.

== Entry list ==
No.	Entrant	Car	Class	Driver 1	Driver 2	Driver 3	Driver 4
SP 9 - FIA GT3 (41 entries)
1	(Germany) Rowe Racing	BMW M4 GT3 Evo	P	(Brazil) Augusto Farfus	(Switzerland) Raffaele Marciello	(South Africa) Jordan Pepper	(South Africa) Kelvin van der Linde
3	(Netherlands) Mercedes-AMG Team Verstappen Racing (Note: Both the No. 3 Mercedes-AMG of Mercedes-AMG Team Verstappen Racing and the No. 80 Mercedes-AMG of Mercedes-AMG Team Ravenol are run by Winward Racing.)	Mercedes-AMG GT3 Evo	P	(Austria) Lucas Auer	(Andorra) Jules Gounon	(Spain) Daniel Juncadella	(Netherlands) Max Verstappen
4	(Armenia) Goroyan RT by Car Collection	Porsche 911 GT3 R (992.2)	PA	(France) Nathanaël Berthon	(Switzerland) Alex Fontana	(Armenia) Artur Goroyan	(Kyrgyzstan) Oleg Kvitka (Note: Kvitka is Russian, but competes under a Kyrgyz licence, "Selv" and Alexey Veremenko are also Russian, as Russian national emblems were banned by the FIA following the Russian invasion of Ukraine.)
5	(Germany) Black Falcon Team EAE	Porsche 911 GT3 R (992.2)	Am	(Germany) Thomas Kiefer	(Turkey) Mustafa Mehmet Kaya	(Italy) Gabriele Piana	(Germany) Mike Stursberg
7	(Austria) Konrad Motorsport	Lamborghini Huracán GT3 Evo 2	P	(Germany) Christian Engelhart	(Bulgaria) Pavel Lefterov	(Germany) Maximilian Paul	(Latvia) Patricija Stalidzane
8	(Lithuania) Juta Racing	Audi R8 LMS Evo II	Am	(Germany) Elia Erhart	(Kyrgyzstan) "Selv"	(Germany) Alexey Veremenko	
11	(Germany) SR Motorsport by Schnitzelalm	Mercedes-AMG GT3 Evo	PA	(Switzerland) Philip Ellis	(Germany) Jannes Fittje	(Germany) Jay Mo Härtling	(Germany) Kenneth Heyer
16	(Germany) Scherer Sport PHX	Audi R8 LMS Evo II	P	(United Kingdom) Ben Green	(Germany) Christopher Haase	(United Kingdom) Alexander Sims	
17	(Germany) Dunlop Motorsport (Note: Both the No. 17 Porsche of Dunlop Motorsports and the No. 44 Porsche of Falken Motorsports are run by Schnabl Engineering.)	Porsche 911 GT3 R (992.2)	P	(France) Julien Andlauer	(France) Dorian Boccolacci	(Germany) Nico Menzel	(Belgium) Alessio Picariello
18	(Germany) Lionspeed GP	Porsche 911 GT3 R (992.2)	PA	(United Kingdom) Jake Hill	(Austria) Max Hofer	(Germany) Patrick Kolb	(United Kingdom) Kyle Tilley
24	(Germany) Lionspeed GP	Porsche 911 GT3 R (992.2)	P	(Switzerland) Ricardo Feller	(Germany) Laurin Heinrich	(Belgium) Laurens Vanthoor	
26	(Germany) PROsport Racing Team Bilstein	Mercedes-AMG GT3 Evo	P	(Germany) Marek Böckmann	(United Kingdom) Adam Christodoulou	(Canada) Mikaël Grenier	(United Kingdom) Chris Lulham
30	(South Korea) Hankook Competition	Porsche 911 GT3 R (992.2)	PA	(South Korea) Roelof Bruins	(Canada) Steven Cho	(South Korea) Jongkyum Kim	(Germany) Marco Seefried
32	(Japan) Toyo Tires with Ring Racing	Mercedes-AMG GT3 Evo	PA	(Germany) Andreas Gülden	(Japan) Yuichi Nakayama	(Germany) Tim Sandtler	
33	(Germany) KKrämer Racing	Audi R8 LMS Evo II	PA	(Germany) Christopher Brück	(Germany) Michele Di Martino	(Germany) Fidel Leib	(Germany) Tobias Vazquez-Garcia
34	(Germany) natural elements by Walkenhorst Motorsport	Aston Martin Vantage AMR GT3 Evo	P	(Italy) Mattia Drudi	(Germany) Felipe Fernández Laser	(Norway) Christian Krognes	(Denmark) Nicki Thiim
35	(Germany) Walkenhorst Motorsport	Aston Martin Vantage AMR GT3 Evo	PA	(Germany) Stefan Aust	(Germany) Felipe Fernández Laser	(Germany) Dennis Fetzer	(Ecuador) Mateo Villagómez
36	(Germany) Saugmotoren Motorsport | 3M	BMW Z4 GT3	PA	(Germany) Valentin Lachenmayer	(Germany) Julian Reeh	(Germany) Christian Scherer	(Germany) Henry Walkenhorst
37	(Germany) PROsport Racing	Aston Martin Vantage AMR GT3	Am	(Belgium) Guido Dumarey	(Germany) Christian Konnerth	(Germany) Markus Lönnroth	(Germany) Tobias Wahl
39	(Germany) Walkenhorst Motorsport	Aston Martin Vantage AMR GT3 Evo	PA	(Norway) Anders Buchardt	(Germany) Nico Hantke	(Netherlands) Mex Jansen	(Germany) Henry Walkenhorst
40	(Netherlands) W.I.S. Racing Team powered by Koopman Racing	BMW Z4 GT3	Am	(Mexico) Juan Carlos Carmona	(Germany) Michael Funke	(Germany) Peter Posavac	(Germany) Volker Strycek
44	(Germany) Falken Motorsports	Porsche 911 GT3 R (992.2)	P	(Austria) Klaus Bachler	(Germany) Tim Heinemann	(Germany) Sven Müller	(Netherlands) Morris Schuring
45	(Japan) Realize Kondo Racing with Rinaldi	Ferrari 296 GT3 Evo	P	(Germany) Dennis Marschall	(France) Thomas Neubauer	(South Africa) David Perel	(Netherlands) Thierry Vermeulen
47	(Hong Kong) KCMG	Mercedes-AMG GT3 Evo	P	(Japan) Nirei Fukuzumi	(Japan) Naoya Gamou	(Finland) Jesse Krohn	(United Kingdom) David Pittard
48	(Germany) 48LOSCH Motorsport by Black Falcon	Porsche 911 GT3 R (992.2)	PA	(Netherlands) "Daan Arrow"	(Germany) Patrick Assenheimer	(Germany) Tobias Müller	(Luxembourg) Dylan Pereira
54	(Italy) Dinamic GT	Porsche 911 GT3 R (992.2)	P	(Denmark) Bastian Buus	(Denmark) Michael Christensen	(Netherlands) Loek Hartog	(Germany) Joel Sturm
55	(Italy) Dinamic GT	Porsche 911 GT3 R (992.2)	P	(Italy) Michele Beretta	(France) Alessandro Ghiretti	(Netherlands) Loek Hartog	(Germany) Joel Sturm
64	(Germany) HRT Ford Racing	Ford Mustang GT3 Evo	P	(India) Arjun Maini	(Switzerland) Fabio Scherer	(Germany) David Schumacher	(Germany) Frank Stippler
65	(Germany) HRT Ford Racing	Ford Mustang GT3 Evo	PA	(Netherlands) Colin Caresani	(Germany) Hubert Haupt	(Germany) Vincent Kolb	(Germany) David Schumacher
67	(Germany) HRT Ford Racing	Ford Mustang GT3 Evo	P	(Germany) Christopher Mies	(Norway) Dennis Olsen	(Germany) Frank Stippler	(Belgium) Frédéric Vervisch
69	(Germany) Dörr Motorsport	McLaren 720S GT3 Evo	P	(Germany) Ben Dörr	(Germany) Timo Glock	(Germany) Marvin Kirchhöfer	(Germany) Timo Scheider
71	(Lithuania) Juta Racing	Audi R8 LMS Evo II	PA	(Germany) Otto Blank	(Germany) Björn Grossmann	(Germany) Christer Jöns	(Germany) Pierre Kaffer
77	(Germany) Schubert Motorsport	BMW M4 GT3 Evo	P	(Austria) Philipp Eng	(Netherlands) Robin Frijns	(Belgium) Charles Weerts	(Germany) Marco Wittmann
80	(United States) Mercedes-AMG Team Ravenol	Mercedes-AMG GT3 Evo	P	(Germany) Maro Engel	(Belgium) Maxime Martin	(Germany) Fabian Schiller	(Germany) Luca Stolz
84	(Germany) Red Bull Team Abt	Lamborghini Huracán GT3 Evo 2	P	(Italy) Mirko Bortolotti	(Germany) Luca Engstler	(Switzerland) Patric Niederhauser	
86	(Denmark) High Class Racing	Porsche 911 GT3 R (992.2)	PA	(Denmark) Anders Fjordbach	(United Kingdom) Harry King	(China) Kerong Li	(China) Leo Ye Hongli
99	(Germany) Rowe Racing	BMW M4 GT3 Evo	P	(United Kingdom) Dan Harper	(Germany) Max Hesse	(South Africa) Sheldon van der Linde	(Belgium) Dries Vanthoor
123	(Belgium) Mühlner Motorsport	Porsche 911 GT3 R (992.2)	PA	(United Kingdom) Alex Brundle	(Germany) Ben Bünnagel	(Estonia) Martin Rump	
130	(Germany) Schaeffler Team Abt	Lamborghini Huracán GT3 Evo 2	P	(Netherlands) Nicky Catsburg	(Italy) Marco Mapelli	(United Kingdom) Nick Yelloly	
786	(Thailand) Renazzo Motorsport	Lamborghini Huracán GT3 Evo 2	Am	(Germany) Christoph Breuer	(Germany) Thomas Mutsch	(Thailand) Kiki Sak Nana	(Germany) Dieter Schmidtmann
911	(Germany) Manthey Racing	Porsche 911 GT3 R (992.2)	P	(Australia) Matt Campbell	(France) Kévin Estre	(Turkey) Ayhancan Güven	(Austria) Thomas Preining
AT1 (2 entries)
19	(Germany) Max Kruse Racing	Audi R8 LMS Evo II	PA	(Netherlands) Tom Coronel	(Netherlands) Duncan Huisman	(Germany) Christian Kohlhaas	(Netherlands) Jan Jaap van Roon
75	(Germany) Max Kruse Racing	Audi R8 LMS Evo II	PA	(Netherlands) Tom Coronel	(Germany) Dominik Fugel	(Germany) Marcel Fugel	(Germany) Benjamin Leuchter
SP 10 – SRO GT4 (13 entries)
90	(Germany) Teichmann Racing	Toyota GR Supra GT4 Evo2	PA	(Belgium) Lucas Cartelle	(France) Edgar Pierre	(Spain) Javier Sagrera	(Germany) Hugo Schwarze
145	(Germany) Riller & Schnauck powered by Cerny Motorsport	BMW M4 GT4 Evo (G82)	PA	(France) Joshua Bednarski	(Netherlands) Jeroen Bleekemolen	(United Kingdom) Peter Cate	(Germany) Tom Schütze
164	(Germany) W&S Motorsport	Porsche 718 Cayman GT4 RS Clubsport	PA	(Germany) Stephan Brodmerkel	(Germany) Hendrik Still	(Austria) Constantin Schöll	(Germany) Jürgen Vöhringer
169	(Germany) Dörr Motorsport	Aston Martin Vantage AMR GT4	Am	(France) Philippe Charlaix	(Germany) Heiko Hahn	(Germany) Peter Sander	(Germany) Roland Waschkau
170	(Japan) Toyo Tires with Ring Racing	Toyota GR Supra GT4 Evo2		(France) Giuliano Alesi	(Japan) Kazuto Kotaka	(Japan) Miki Koyama	(Japan) Shunji Okumoto
171	(Switzerland) BSL Racing Team	Porsche 718 Cayman GT4 RS Clubsport	Am	(Switzerland) Philipp Hagnauer	(Germany) Arno Klasen	(Sweden) Eric Ullström	(Switzerland) Alexander Walker
175	(Germany) PROsport-Racing	Mercedes-AMG GT4	Am	(Sweden) Gustav Bard	(Belgium) Jacques Derenne	(Germany) Carsten Kautz	(Argentina) Marcos Adolfo Vázquez
176	(Germany) PROsport-Racing	Mercedes-AMG GT4	PA	(Germany) Yannik Himmels	(Spain) Lluc Ibàñez	(Portugal) Guilherme Oliveira	(Germany) Jörg Viebahn
177	(Germany) Rebel Racing by Black Falcon	BMW M4 GT4 Evo (G82)	PA	(United States) Malcolm Harrison	(Romania) Sergiu Nicolae	(United States) Mark Smith	(Romania) Alexandru Vasilescu
180	(Germany) AV Racing by Black Falcon	BMW M4 GT4 Evo (G82)	Am	(United States) Judson Holt	(United States) Dave Ogburn	(United States) Denny Stripling	(United States) Charles Turner
187	(Germany) FK Performance Motorsport	BMW M4 GT4 (G82)	PA	(South Africa) Leyton Fourie	(Germany) Luca Link	(Germany) Moritz Wiskirchen	(Germany) Nick Wüstenhagen
189	(Switzerland) Hofor Racing by Bonk Motorsport	BMW M4 GT4 Evo (G82)	Am	(Germany) Michael Bonk	(Switzerland) Martin Kroll	(Switzerland) Ranko Mijatovic	(Germany) Jörg Weidinger
888	(Switzerland) Hofor Racing by Bonk Motorsport	BMW M4 GT4 Evo (G82)	PA	(Germany) Max Partl	(Germany) Michael Schrey	(Germany) Philip Wiskirchen	(Germany) Thorsten Wolter
Cup2 - Porsche 992 Cup (11 entries)
13	(Germany) White Angel for Fly and Help	Porsche 911 GT3 Cup (992.1)	Am	(Germany) Bernd Albrecht	(Germany) Kurt Ecke	(Germany) Andreas Sczepansky	(Germany) Mike Jäger
95	(Germany) Sante Royale Racing Team	Porsche 911 GT3 Cup (992.1)	P	(Germany) David Kiefer	(Germany) Marius Kiefer	(Germany) Stefan Kiefer	(Austria) Luca Rettenbacher
777	(Germany) RPM Racing	Porsche 911 GT3 Cup (992.1)	Am	(Germany) Philip Hamprecht	(Netherlands) Patrick Huisman	(Sweden) Niclas Jönsson	(United States) Tracy Krohn
900	(Germany) Black Falcon Team Zimmermann	Porsche 911 GT3 Cup (992.1)	P	(Germany) Alexander Hardt	(Chile) Benjamín Hites	(Germany) Benjamin Koslowski	(Netherlands) Paul Meijer
902	(Germany) Team Liqui Moly by Black Falcon	Porsche 911 GT3 Cup (992.1)	P	(United States) Ryan Harrison	(Germany) Noah Nagelsdiek	(Austria) Raphael Rennhofer	(Germany) Leon Wassertheurer
904	(Belgium) Mühlner Motorsport	Porsche 911 GT3 Cup (992.1)	Am	(Hungary) Adam Benko	(Germany) Moritz Kranz	(Hungary) Csaba Walter	(Slovakia) Antal Zsigó
908	(Switzerland) Hofor Racing	Porsche 911 GT3 Cup (992.1)	Am	(Switzerland) Michael Kroll	(Germany) Torsten Kratz	(Germany) Thomas Mühlenz	(Switzerland) Alexander Prinz
909	(Germany) KKrämer Racing	Porsche 911 GT3 Cup (992.1)	Am	(Switzerland) Michelangelo Comazzi	(Germany) Karsten Krämer	(France) Leo Messenger	(Germany) Peter Sander
918	(Belgium) Mühlner Motorsport	Porsche 911 GT3 Cup (992.1)	P	(Denmark) Michelle Gatting	(Germany) Michael Rebhan	(Germany) Nick Salewsky	(Germany) Tim Scheerbarth
919	(Germany) Team Clickvers.de	Porsche 911 GT3 Cup (992.1)	P	(Germany) Robin Chrzanowski	(Germany) Kersten Jodexnis	(Germany) Richard-Sven Jodexnis	(New Zealand) Peter Scharmach
925	(Germany) Huber Motorsport	Porsche 911 GT3 Cup (992.1)	P	(United States) Christopher Allen	(United States) Jaden Lander	(United States) Jon Miller	(Germany) Hans Wehrmann
Cup3 - Cayman GT4 Trophy (17 entries)
939	(Germany) Black Falcon Team Zimmermann	Porsche 718 Cayman GT4 RS Clubsport	Am	(Germany) Alexander Kroker	(Germany) Anton Ruf	(Germany) Axel Sartingen	(Germany) Nils Schwenk
941	(Germany) Adrenalin Motorsport Team Mainhattan Wheels	Porsche 718 Cayman GT4 RS Clubsport	P	(Germany) Jacob Erlbacher	(Germany) Adrian Rziczny	(Netherlands) Mark van der Snel	(Netherlands) Max van der Snel
945	(Thailand) Renazzo Motorsport	Porsche 718 Cayman GT4 RS Clubsport	Am	(Germany) Alexander Meixner	(Germany) Markus Nölken	(Germany) Ulrich Daniel Nölken	(Japan) Kouichi Okumura
949	(Germany) SRS Team Sorg Rennsport	Porsche 718 Cayman GT4 RS Clubsport	Am	(Sweden) Tommy Gråberg	(India) Akshay Gupta	(Germany) Björn Simon	(Germany) Aaron Wenisch
952	(Germany) Smyrlis Racing	Porsche 718 Cayman GT4 RS Clubsport	P	(Germany) Alex Koch	(Germany) Christian Kraus	(Germany) Henry Lindloff	(Norway) Peder Saltvedt
959	(Germany) SRS Team Sorg Rennsport	Porsche 718 Cayman GT4 RS Clubsport	P	(Germany) Heiko Eichenberg	(Germany) Fabio Grosse	(Switzerland) Patrik Grütter	(United Kingdom) Harley Haughton
961	(Germany) W&S Motorsport	Porsche 718 Cayman GT4 RS Clubsport	P	(China) Chao Lu	(Czech Republic) Michal Makeš	(Germany) Marius Rauer	(China) Zhang Zhendong
962	(Germany) W&S Motorsport	Porsche 718 Cayman GT4 RS Clubsport	P	(Germany) Moritz Oberheim	(Finland) Philip Miemois	(Germany) Lorenz Stegmann	(Germany) Niclas Wiedmann
966	(Germany) asBest Racing	Porsche 718 Cayman GT4 RS Clubsport	P	(Germany) Leonard Oehme	(Germany) Moritz Oehme	(Germany) Jan-Niklas Stieler	(Lithuania) Kasparas Vingilis
967	(United Kingdom) Breakell Racing	Porsche 718 Cayman GT4 RS Clubsport	P	(United Kingdom) Josh Hislop	(United Kingdom) Pippa Mann	(United Kingdom) Martin Rich	(Morocco) Karim Sekkat
969	(Germany) SRS Team Sorg Rennsport	Porsche 718 Cayman GT4 RS Clubsport	Am	(United States) Joshua Jacobs	(New Zealand) Guy Stewart	(Germany) Kurt Strube	(Austria) Bernhard Wagner
971	(Germany) Speedworxx Automotive	Porsche 718 Cayman GT4 RS Clubsport	P	(Germany) Erik Braun	(Germany) Alexander Fielenbach	(Germany) Franz Linden	(Norway) Oskar Sandberg
977	(Switzerland) BSL Racing Team	Porsche 718 Cayman GT4 RS Clubsport	Am	(Switzerland) Marc Arn	(Switzerland) Philipp Frommenwiler	(Germany) Christoph Ruhrmann	(Switzerland) Marcel Zimmermann
978	(Germany) KKrämer Racing	Porsche 718 Cayman GT4 RS Clubsport	Am	(Germany) Olaf Baunack	(Germany) Mario Handrick	(Germany) Marco Lamsouguer	(Germany) Michael Mönch
979	(Germany) SRS Team Sorg Rennsport	Porsche 718 Cayman GT4 RS Clubsport	P	(United States) Seth Brown	(Germany) Christian Coen	(Germany) "Maximilian"	(Canada) Damon Surzyshyn
982	(Germany) W&S Motorsport	Porsche 718 Cayman GT4 RS Clubsport	Am	(Germany) Axel Duffner	(Germany) Christoph Krombach	(Germany) Oliver Kunz	(Germany) Leo-Livius Arne Weber
999	(Belgium) Mühlner Motorsport	Porsche 718 Cayman GT4 RS Clubsport	P	(Germany) Matthias Beckwermert	(Canada) Maxwell Polzler	(Germany) Kai Riemer	(Germany) Christopher Rink
SP-X (5 entries)
61	(Germany) HWA Engineering Speed	Mercedes-Benz 190E HWA EVO.R	P	(United States) Adam Adelson	(Germany) Lance David Arnold	(United Kingdom) Jamie Green	(Netherlands) Renger van der Zande
62	(Germany) HWA Engineering Speed	Mercedes-Benz 190E HWA EVO.R	P	(United States) Adam Adelson	(Germany) Sebastian Asch	(Germany) Luca Ludwig	(Germany) Markus Winkelhock
63	(Germany) HWA Engineering Speed	Mercedes-Benz 190E HWA EVO.R	P	(Germany) Christian Gebhardt	(Norway) Evald Holstad	(United States) Peter Ludwig	(Canada) Bruno Spengler
66	(Austria) Reiter Engineering	KTM X-Bow GTX	PA	(Switzerland) Miklas Born	(Germany) Arne Hoffmeister	(Germany) Laurents Hörr	(Germany) Marcel Marchewicz
81	(Germany) Schubert Motorsport	BMW M3 Touring 24H	P	(United States) Connor De Phillippi	(Belgium) Ugo de Wilde	(Germany) Jens Klingmann	(United States) Neil Verhagen
Other Classes
TCR (4 entries)
89	(Germany) KMA-Racing	Volkswagen Golf GTI TCR		(Germany) Dirk Groneck	(Germany) Maik Knappmeier	(Germany) Marco Knappmeier	
577	(Germany) asBest Racing	Cupra Leon Competición TCR		(Germany) Dennis Leissing	(Germany) Lutz Obermann	(Germany) Max Rosam	(Germany) Mark Trompeter
776	(Germany) Sharky Racing	Audi RS 3 LMS TCR (2021)		(Germany) Philipp Eis	(Italy) Gian Maria Gabbiani	(Sweden) Mikaela Åhlin-Kottulinsky	(Latvia) Ivars Vallers
830	(South Korea) Hyundai Motorsport N	Hyundai Elantra N TCR (2024)		(Spain) Mikel Azcona	(Germany) Marc Basseng	(Germany) Nico Bastian	(Germany) Manuel Lauck
AT2 (3 entries)
146	(Singapore) Giti Tire Motorsport by WS Racing	Porsche 911 GT3 Cup (992.1)		(Germany) Michelle Halder	(Germany) Janina Schall	(Germany) Carrie Schreiner	(Liechtenstein) Fabienne Wohlwend
320	(Germany) Four Motors Bioconcept-Car	Porsche 911 GT3 Cup (992.1)		(Denmark) Henrik Bollerslev	(Argentina) Nano López	(Germany) "Smudo"	(Netherlands) Marco van Ramshorst
632	(Germany) Black Falcon Team Fanatec	Porsche 911 GT3 Cup (992.1)		(United Kingdom) Steve Alvarez Brown	(United Kingdom) Jimmy Broadbent	(Netherlands) Misha Charoudin	(Germany) Manuel Metzger
SP-Pro (1 entry)
992	(Germany) Manthey Team eFuel Griesemann	Porsche 992 GT3 Cup MR		(Germany) Dirk Adorf	(Germany) Björn Griesemann	(Germany) Georg Griesemann	(Germany) Marco Holzer
SP 8T (1 entry)
59	(Germany) Dörr Motorsport	McLaren Artura Trophy Evo		(Germany) Phil Dörr	(Germany) Guido Naumann	(Germany) Sven Schädler	(Germany) Frank Weishar
SP 7 (3 entries)
82	(Germany) Overtakerracing x tm-racing.org	Porsche 718 Cayman GT4 RS Clubsport		(Germany) Sebastian Brandl	(Poland) Jacek Pydys	(Germany) Michael Schröder	(Germany) Marco Vitonelli
91	(Austria) Reiter Engineering	Porsche 991 GT3 II Cup		(Germany) Matthias Benndorf	(Germany) Lukas Ertl	(Germany) Maximilian Ertl	(Germany) Stefan Ertl
420	(Germany) Four Motors Bioconcept-Car	Porsche 718 Cayman GT4 RS Clubsport		(Germany) Henning Cramer	(Germany) Georg Kiefer	(Switzerland) Marc Schöni	(Germany) Oliver Sprungmann
SP 4T (5 entries)
50	(Germany) Max Kruse Racing	Volkswagen Golf GTI Clubsport 24h		(Germany) Heiko Hammel	(Sweden) Johan Kristoffersson	(Germany) Benjamin Leuchter	(Germany) Nicholas Otto
76	(Germany) Max Kruse Racing	Volkswagen Golf GTI Clubsport 24h		(Germany) Timo Hochwind	(South Africa) Jonathan Mogotsi	(Germany) Nicholas Otto	(Germany) Fabian Vettel
88	(Japan) Subaru Tecnica International	Subaru WRX STI GT N24		(Netherlands) Carlo van Dam	(Japan) Takuto Iguchi	(Japan) Rintaro Kubo	(Japan) Kota Sasaki
302	(South Korea) Hyundai Motorsport N	Hyundai Elantra N1 RP		(Spain) Mikel Azcona	(South Korea) Youngchan Kim	(Germany) Manuel Lauck	(Germany) Mark Wallenwein
303	(South Korea) Hyundai Motorsport N	Hyundai Elantra N1 RP		(South Korea) Gyumin Kim	(Puerto Rico) Carlos José Sepúlveda	(South Korea) Woojin Shin	(Germany) Mark Wallenwein
SP 4 (1 entry)
152	(Germany) Oepen Motors Automobilsport	BMW 346C		(Germany) Christian Koger	(Germany) Henrik Launhardt	(Germany) Ingo Oepen	
SP 3T (7 entries)
10	(Germany) Max Kruse Racing	Volkswagen Golf GTI Clubsport 24h		(Germany) Jens Dralle	(Germany) Max Kruse	(Switzerland) Christoph Lenz	(Germany) Matthias Wasel
300	(Germany) Ollis Garage Racing	Dacia Logan		(Germany) Alexander Becker	(Germany) Christian Geilfus	(Germany) Oliver Kriese	(Germany) Robert Neumann
317	(Germany) 2R Racing	Audi TT RS		(Germany) Wolfgang Haugg	(Germany) Thorsten Jung	(Germany) Dirk Vleugels	(Germany) Roland Waschkau
321	(Germany) Sharky Racing	Volkswagen Golf GTI TCR		(Germany) Danny Brink	(Germany) Finn Mache	(Germany) Joris Primke	(Germany) Moritz Rosenbach
800	(Germany) asBest Racing	Volkswagen Golf GTI TCR		(Germany) Thomas Ardelt	(Germany) Manuel Dormagen	(Germany) Tim Lukas Müller	(Germany) Sven Oepen
808	(Germany) asBest Racing	Cupra León TCR		(South Korea) Son Geon	(Poland) Rafał Gieras	(Hong Kong) Samuel Hsieh	(Japan) Junichi Umemoto
821	(Germany) Sharky Racing	Audi RS 3 LMS TCR (2017)		(Germany) Stephan Epp	(Germany) Mats Heidler	(Germany) René Steiger	(Germany) Alexander Weber
SP 3 (1 entry)
277	(Germany) Ravenol Motorsport by MDM Racing	BMW 318ti		(Germany) Leo Geisler	(United Kingdom) Mike Harris	(Germany) Marc David Müller	(Germany) Henrik Seibel
SP 2T (3 entries)
109	(Japan) Toyota Gazoo Rookie Racing	Toyota GR Yaris DAT Concept		(Japan) "Morizo"	(Japan) Hiroaki Ishiura	(Japan) Kazuya Oshima	(Japan) Daisuke Toyoda
110	(Japan) Toyota Gazoo Rookie Racing	Toyota GR Yaris DAT Concept		(Japan) "Morizo"	(Japan) Kazuya Oshima	(Japan) Masahiro Sasaki	(Japan) Daisuke Toyoda
380	(Germany) Bitter Motorsport	Bitter Corsa		(Germany) Björn Morhin	(Germany) Christian Schäffer	(Germany) Jan Soumagne	(Germany) Volker Strycek
V6 (5 entries)
396	(Germany) Adrenalin Motorsport Team Mainhattan Wheels	Porsche Cayman S		(Spain) Carlos Arimón	(Germany) Christian Büllesbach	(Germany) Klaus Fassbender	(Germany) Andreas Schettler
410	(Germany) rent2Drive-racing	Porsche Cayman GTS		(Germany) David Ackermann	(Italy) Stefano Croci	(France) Jérôme Larbi	(Latvia) Matīss Mežaks
415	(Germany) Köppen Motorsport	Porsche 911 Carrera		(Germany) Bastian Arend	(Germany) Maximilian Arnold	(Germany) Alexander Köppen	(Germany) Sebastian Rings
418	(Germany) SRS Team Sorg Rennsport	Porsche Cayman S		(Germany) Tabea Jünger	(Mexico) Xavier Lamadrid	(Australia) César Mendieta	(Mexico) Luis Ramírez
448	(Germany) Overtakerracing x tm-racing.org	Porsche Cayman S		(Germany) Christian Knötschke	(Germany) Torsten Krey	(Germany) Alexander Müller	(Germany) Christian Weber
V5 (5 entries)
440	(Germany) aQTQ-Raceperformance	Porsche Cayman CQ11		(Switzerland) Mirco Böhmisch	(Germany) Florian Ebener	(Germany) Andreas Müller	(Germany) Florian Quante
444	(Germany) Adrenalin Motorsport Team Mainhattan Wheels	Porsche Cayman CM12		(Germany) Daniel Korn	(Germany) Tobias Korn	(Germany) Ulrich Korn	(Moldova) Serghei Levlev
445	(Germany) rent2Drive-racing	Porsche Cayman CM12		(Germany) Philip Ade	(Germany) Georg Arbinger	(France) Joël Le Bihan	(Germany) Jan Karsten Welker
454	(Germany) Pure Racing	Porsche Cayman CM12		(Austria) Peter Baumann	(Germany) Andreas Hansen	(Germany) Jan Hendrik Heimbach	(Germany) John Lee Schambony
455	(Germany) Pure Racing	Porsche Cayman CM12		(Austria) Peter Baumann	(Germany) Thorsten Held	(Germany) John Lee Schambony	(Germany) Matthias Trinius
VT2 (14 entries)
471	(Germany) Jung Motorsport	Cupra Leon KL	VTF	(Germany) Michael Eichhorn	(United States) Tony Roma	(Germany) Andreas Winterwerber	
472	(Germany) Jung Motorsport	Cupra Leon KL	VTF	(Germany) Marc Etzkorn	(Germany) Lars Füting	(Germany) Marcel Müller	(Thailand) Thanathip Thanalapanan
474	(Germany) Time Attack Paderborn by GTÜ Wieseler	Volkswagen Golf Mk 7.5	VTF	(Germany) Fritz Hebig	(Switzerland) Boris Hrubesch	(Germany) Fabian Tillmann	(Germany) Michael Wolpertinger
477	(Germany) asBest Racing	Volkswagen Scirocco	VTF	(Germany) Bastian Beck	(Germany) Sascha Korte	(Germany) Michael Lachmayer	(Germany) Thomas Mennecke
480	(Germany) Dupré Engineering	Audi S3 Saloon (8Y)	VTF	(Germany) Christoph Dupré	(Germany) Joachim Nett	(Germany) Jürgen Nett	
500	(Germany) Adrenalin Motorsport Team Mainhattan Wheels	BMW 330i (G20)	VTH	(Germany) Philipp Leisen	(Germany) Philipp Stahlschmidt	(Germany) "Sub7BTG"	(Germany) Daniel Zils
501	(Germany) Adrenalin Motorsport Team Mainhattan Wheels	BMW 330i (G20)	VTH	(Germany) Jürgen Huber	(Germany) Marvin Kobus	(Germany) Christoph Merkt	(Germany) Hermann Vortkamp
503	(Singapore) Giti Tire Motorsport by WS Racing	Toyota GR Supra (A90)	VTH	(Germany) Niklas Ehrhardt	(Germany) Thomas Ehrhardt	(Germany) Fabian Pirrone	(Germany) Julia Ponkratz
505	(Germany) Keeevin Motorsport	BMW 328i (F30)	VTH	(Germany) Matthias Aretz	(Poland) Nikodem Silecki	(Germany) Daniel Sowada	(Germany) Serge Van Vooren
514	(Germany) SRS Team Sorg Rennsport	BMW 330i (G20)	VTH	(Italy) Alberto Carobbio	(Germany) Calvin De Groot	(Germany) Heinz Jürgen Kroner	(Italy) Ugo Vicenzi
519	Ravenol Motorsport Japan	Toyota GR Supra (A90)	VTH	(Germany) Manfred Röss	(Germany) Matthias Röss	(Germany) Malte Tack	
520	(Japan) Toyo Tires with Ring Racing	Toyota GR Supra (A90)	VTH	(Japan) Jin Horino	(Japan) Masato Kawabata	(Japan) Hokuto Matsuyama	(Japan) Takuma Miyazono
524	(Germany) SRS Team Sorg Rennsport	Toyota GR Supra (A90)	VTH	(Germany) Mathias Baar	(Germany) Maximilian Eisberg	(Netherlands) Piet-Jan Ooms	(Japan) Yutaka Seki
569	(Germany) NFR motorsports	BMW 330i (G20)	VTH	(Germany) Benny Baller	(Netherlands) Max de Bruijn	(Germany) Stefan Gaukler	(Netherlands) Lars van 't Veer
BMW M2 Racing (4 entries)
870	(Germany) Adrenalin Motorsport Team Mainhattan Wheels	BMW M2 Racing (G87)		(Japan) Ryusho Konishi	(Germany) Alesia Kreutzpointner	(Germany) Jacqueline Kreutzpointner	(China) Yunfeng Zou
878	(Germany) SRS Team Sorg Rennsport	BMW M2 Racing (G87)		(Germany) Darian Donkel	(Germany) Maximilian Hill	(Belgium) Tim Peeters	(Germany) Max Schlichenmeier
898	(Germany) Walkenhorst Motorsport	BMW M2 Racing (G87)		(Germany) Maxim Felix Dacher	(Germany) Bennet Ehrl	(Japan) Takayuki Kinoshita	(United States) Tazio Ottis
899	(Germany) W&S Motorsport	BMW M2 CS Racing Cup		(Germany) Frank Anhorn	(Germany) Yanis Anhorn	(Luxembourg) Max Lamesch	(Luxembourg) John Marechal
BMW M240i Racing (11 entries)
195	(Germany) Adrenalin Motorsport Team Mainhattan Wheels	BMW M240i Racing (F22)		(Israel) Hagay Farran	(Israel) Moran Gott	(Netherlands) Filip Hoenjet	
650	(Germany) Adrenalin Motorsport Team Mainhattan Wheels	BMW M240i Racing (F22)		(Germany) Benjamin Albers	(Argentina) Santiago Baztarrica	(Germany) Yannick Fübrich	(Germany) Sven Markert
651	(Germany) Adrenalin Motorsport Team Mainhattan Wheels	BMW M240i Racing (F22)		(United States) Johnny Huang	(China) Ke Shao	(United States) Nico Silva	(Germany) Kevin Wambach
652	(Germany) Adrenalin Motorsport Team Mainhattan Wheels	BMW M240i Racing (F22)		(France) Grégoire Boutonnet	(France) Laurent Laparra	(Ukraine) Oleg Kravets	(Romania) Aldrin Opran
653	(Germany) Adrenalin Motorsport Team Mainhattan Wheels	BMW M240i Racing (F22)		(Italy) Edoardo Bugane	(United Kingdom) "Farquini"	(United Kingdom) Ben Pitch	(Belgium) Axel Soyez
658	(Belgium) JJ Motorsport	BMW M240i Racing (F22)		(Belgium) Jarno Dhauw	(Belgium) Hakan Sari	(Belgium) Recep Sari	
665	(Singapore) Giti Tire Motorsport by WS Racing	BMW M240i Racing (F22)		(Germany) Jannik Reinhard	(Germany) Ulf Steffens	(Germany) Jan Ullrich	(Netherlands) John van der Sanden
667	(United Kingdom) Breakell Racing	BMW M240i Racing (F22)		(United Kingdom) James Breakell	(Spain) Álvaro Fontes	(Republic of Ireland) Aidan Mulready	(Germany) Andreas Simon
669	(Germany) Keeevin Motorsport GmbH	BMW M240i Racing (F22)		(Turkey) Zeynel Babacan	(Germany) Maximilian Kurz	(Germany) Riccardo Petrolo	
670	(Singapore) Giti Tire Motorsport by WS Racing	BMW M240i Racing (F22)		(France) Valentin Belgy	(Germany) Michael Bräutigam	(Germany) Dennis Garbe	(France) Adrien Paviot
677	(Germany) asBest Racing	BMW M240i Racing (F22)		(Switzerland) Thomas Alpiger	(Switzerland) Marco Grilli	(Switzerland) Michael Neuhauser	(Germany) Sebastian Tauber
BMW 325i (4 entries)
100	(Germany) Pistorius by EiFelkind Racing	BMW 325i Racing (E90)		(Austria) Markus Fischer	(Germany) Oliver Frisse	(Germany) Christopher Gruber	(Germany) Henning Hausmeier
101	(Germany) EiFelkind Racing	BMW 325i Racing (E90)		(Poland) Sebastian Lawniczek	(Germany) Nils Renken	(Germany) Marco Schmitz	(Germany) Tim Schwolow
108	(Germany) asBest Racing	BMW 325i Racing (E90)		(Germany) Richard Bäther	(Germany) Sarah Ganser	(Switzerland) Marco Grilli	(Germany) Alex Schneider
112	(Germany) JS Competition	BMW 325i Racing (E90)		(Germany) Eugen Becker	(Germany) Bernd Küpper	(Germany) Jonas Spölgen	(Switzerland) Flurin Zimmermann

Icon	Class
GT3 entries
P	SP9 GT3-Pro
PA	SP9 GT3 Pro-Am
Am	SP9 GT3 Am
GT4 entries
PA	SP10 GT4 Pro-Am
Am	SP10 GT4 Am
992 entries
Icon	Class
P	Cup 2-Pro
Am	Cup 2-Am
Cayman GT4 entries
Icon	Class
P	Cup 3-Pro
Am	Cup 3-Am
AT1 entries
PA	AT1 Pro-Am
SP-X entries
Icon	Class
P	SP-X Pro
PA	SP-X Pro-Am
VT2 Production entries
VTF	VT2 Front
VTH	VT2 Hecka

== Qualifying ==
=== Top Qualifying / Starting Group 1 ===
Pos.	Class	No.	Team	Car	Fastest lap from Qualifying 1 and 2	Top Qualifying 1	Top Qualifying 2	Top Qualifying 3	Grid
1	SP9 Pro	84	(Germany) Red Bull Team Abt ^{TQ3}	Lamborghini Huracán GT3 Evo 2	8:28.102	—N/a	—N/a	8:11.123	1
2	SP9 Pro	130	(Germany) Schaeffler Team Abt	Lamborghini Huracán GT3 Evo 2	8:21.998	8:14.734	8:10.485	8:11.468	2
3	SP9 Pro	16	(Germany) Scherer Sport PHX ^{TQ3}	Audi R8 LMS Evo II	8:27.080	8:14.773	—N/a	8:11.984	3
4	SP9 Pro	3	(Netherlands) Mercedes-AMG Team Verstappen Racing	Mercedes-AMG GT3 Evo	8:18.539	8:14.871	8:11.614	8:12.005	4
5	SP9 Pro	45	(Japan) Realize Kondo Racing with Rinaldi ^{TQ3}	Ferrari 296 GT3 Evo	8:30.609	8:18.161	—N/a	8:12.221	5
6	SP9 Pro	7	(Austria) Konrad Motorsport	Lamborghini Huracán GT3 Evo 2	8:49.757	8:16.517	8:11.937	8:12.256	6
7	SP9 Pro	64	(Germany) HRT Ford Racing	Ford Mustang GT3 Evo	8:26.751	8:14.397	8:11.278	8:13.676	7
8	SP9 Pro	911	(Germany) Manthey Racing	Porsche 911 GT3 R (992.2)	8:21.717	8:15.536	8:11.222	8:13.939	8
9	SP9 Pro	1	(Germany) Rowe Racing ^{TQ3}	BMW M4 GT3 Evo	8:18.069	10:34.967	—N/a	8:14.256	9
10	SP9 Pro	47	(Hong Kong) KCMG ^{TQ3}	BMW M4 GT3 Evo	8:31.958	—N/a	—N/a	8:14.627	10
11	SP9 Pro	34	(Germany) natural elements by Walkenhorst Motorsport	Aston Martin Vantage AMR GT3 Evo	8:43.211	8:12.135	8:10.624	8:15.250	11
12	SP9 Pro	67	(Germany) HRT Ford Racing	Ford Mustang GT3 Evo	8:56.102 (Note: Not all drivers managed to complete required laps in Qualifying sessions.)	8:16.462	8:11.423	8:16.144	12
13	SP9 Pro	26	(Germany) PROsport Racing Team Bilstein	Mercedes-AMG GT3 Evo	8:34.139	8:17.520	8:13.935	—N/a	13
14	SP9 Pro-Am	65	(Germany) HRT Ford Racing	Ford Mustang GT3 Evo	8:42.958	8:15.024	8:14.147	—N/a	14
15	SP9 Pro	77	(Germany) Schubert Motorsport	BMW M4 GT3 Evo	8:26.625	8:16.783	8:14.528	—N/a	15
16	AT1 Pro-Am	75	(Germany) Max Kruse Racing	Audi R8 LMS Evo II	8:39.175	8:17.383	8:14.760	—N/a	16
17	SP9 Pro	44	(Germany) Falken Motorsports	Porsche 911 GT3 R (992.2)	8:29.393	8:18.871	8:15.689	—N/a	17
18	SP9 Pro	99	(Germany) Rowe Racing	BMW M4 GT3 Evo	8:18.602	8:17.022	8:16.541	—N/a	18
19	SP9 Pro-Am	11	(Germany) SR Motorsport by Schnitzelalm	Mercedes-AMG GT3 Evo	8:32.869	8:18.974	8:17.622	—N/a	19
20	SP9 Pro-Am	48	(Germany) 48LOSCH Motorsport by Black Falcon	Porsche 911 GT3 R (992.2)	8:30.935	8:17.093	8:18.088	—N/a	20
21	SP9 Pro	54	(Italy) Dinamic GT	Porsche 911 GT3 R (992.2)	8:32.567	8:17.732	8:18.580	—N/a	21
22	SP-X Pro	81	(Germany) Schubert Motorsport	BMW M3 Touring 24H	8:28.548	8:16.662	8:18.868	—N/a	22
23	SP9 Pro-Am	35	(Germany) Walkenhorst Motorsport	Aston Martin Vantage AMR GT3 Evo	10:12.683	8:16.974	8:23.897	—N/a	23
24	SP9 Pro	24	(Germany) Lionspeed GP	Porsche 911 GT3 R (992.2)	8:23.827	8:17.894	8:30.917	—N/a	24
25	SP9 Pro	80	(United States) Mercedes-AMG Team Ravenol	Mercedes-AMG GT3 Evo	8:14.957	8:15.471	No time	—N/a	25
26	SP9 Pro-Am	71	(Lithuania) Juta Racing	Audi R8 LMS Evo II	8:41.760	8:19.028	—N/a	—N/a	26
27	SP9 Pro	17	(Germany) Dunlop Motorsport	Porsche 911 GT3 R (992.2)	8:27.176	8:19.941	—N/a	—N/a	27
28	SP9 Pro	55	(Italy) Dinamic GT	Porsche 911 GT3 R (992.2)	10:07.117	8:20.158	—N/a	—N/a	28
29	SP9 Am	5	(Germany) Black Falcon Team EAE	Porsche 911 GT3 R (992.2)	8:44.810	8:20.519	—N/a	—N/a	29
30	SP9 Pro-Am	4	(Armenia) Goroyan RT by Car Collection	Porsche 911 GT3 R (992.2)	8:32.456	8:22.065	—N/a	—N/a	30
31	AT1 Pro-Am	19	(Germany) Max Kruse Racing	Audi R8 LMS Evo II	8:50.451	8:22.531	—N/a	—N/a	31
32	SP9 Pro-Am	39	(Germany) Walkenhorst Motorsport	Aston Martin Vantage AMR GT3 Evo	8:58.853	8:23.416	—N/a	—N/a	32
33	SP9 Pro-Am	123	(Belgium) Mühlner Motorsport	Porsche 911 GT3 R (992.2)	8:35.740	8:24.299	—N/a	—N/a	33
34	SP9 Pro	69	(Germany) Dörr Motorsport	McLaren 720S GT3 Evo	8:36.357	8:25.662	—N/a	—N/a	34
35	SP9 Am	786	(Thailand) Renazzo Motorsport	Lamborghini Huracán GT3 Evo 2	10:20.815	8:26.389	—N/a	—N/a	35
36	SP9 Pro-Am	18	(Germany) Lionspeed GP	Porsche 911 GT3 R (992.2)	8:46.440	8:27.886	—N/a	—N/a	36
37	SP9 Pro-Am	30	(South Korea) Hankook Competition	Porsche 911 GT3 R (992)	8:38.166	8:28.453	—N/a	—N/a	37
38	SP9 Am	8	(Lithuania) Juta Racing	Audi R8 LMS Evo II	9:06.567	8:29.481	—N/a	—N/a	38
39	SP-X Pro-Am	66	(Austria) Reiter Engineering	KTM X-Bow GTX	8:53.417	8:33.780	—N/a	—N/a	39
40	SP9 Pro-Am	32	(Japan) Toyo Tires with Ring Racing	Mercedes-AMG GT3 Evo	8:32.483	8:34.500	—N/a	—N/a	40
41	SP-Pro	992	(Germany) Manthey Team eFuel Griesemann	Porsche 992 GT3 Cup MR	9:00.980	8:35.046	—N/a	—N/a	41
42	SP9 Pro-Am	86	(Denmark) High Class Racing	Porsche 911 GT3 R (992.2)	8:35.510	8:35.904	—N/a	—N/a	42
43	SP9 Am	37	(Germany) PROsport Racing	Aston Martin Vantage AMR GT3	8:47.796	8:38.691	—N/a	—N/a	43
44	SP-X Pro	62	(Germany) HWA Engineering Speed	Mercedes-Benz 190E HWA EVO.R	8:49.127	8:43.624	—N/a	—N/a	44
45	SP-X Pro	61	(Germany) HWA Engineering Speed	Mercedes-Benz 190E HWA EVO.R	9:01.370	8:45.641	—N/a	—N/a	45
46	SP-X Pro	63	(Germany) HWA Engineering Speed	Mercedes-Benz 190E HWA EVO.R	9:18.049	8:52.431	—N/a	—N/a	46
47	SP9 Am	36	(Germany) Saugmotoren Motorsport | 3M	BMW Z4 GT3	9:05.771	9:09.541	—N/a	—N/a	47
48	SP9 Am	40	(Netherlands) W.I.S. Racing Team powered by Koopman Racing	BMW Z4 GT3	9:12.833	9:10.671	—N/a	—N/a	48
—	SP9 Pro-Am	33	(Germany) KKrämer Racing	Audi R8 LMS Evo II	8:29.072	No time	—N/a	—N/a	49

^{TQ3} — Pre-seeded to Top Qualifying 3

=== Starting Group 2 ===
Pos.	Class	No.	Team	Car	Fastest lap from Qualifying 1, 2 and 3	Grid
1	AT2	632	(Germany) Black Falcon Team Fanatec	Porsche 911 GT3 Cup (992.1)	8:37.721	1
2	Cup2 Pro	918	(Belgium) Mühlner Motorsport	Porsche 911 GT3 Cup (992.1)	8:38.418	2
3	Cup2 Am	904	(Belgium) Mühlner Motorsport	Porsche 911 GT3 Cup (992.1)	8:38.645	3
6	Cup2 Pro	902	(Germany) Team Liqui Moly by Black Falcon	Porsche 911 GT3 Cup (992.1)	8:43.550	4
7	Cup2 Pro	925	(Germany) Huber Motorsport	Porsche 911 GT3 Cup (992.1)	8:43.724	5
8	Cup2 Am	909	(Germany) KKrämer Racing	Porsche 911 GT3 Cup (992.1)	8:45.104	6
9	TCR	830	(South Korea) Hyundai Motorsport N	Hyundai Elantra N TCR (2024)	8:52.718	7
10	AT2	320	(Germany) Four Motors Bioconcept-Car	Porsche 911 GT3 Cup (992.1)	8:53.865	8
11	SP10 Pro-Am	888	(Switzerland) Hofor Racing by Bonk Motorsport	BMW M4 GT4 Evo (G82)	8:56.664	9
12	SP7	91	(Austria) Reiter Engineering	Porsche 991 GT3 II Cup	8:58.672	10
13	SP10 Pro-Am	145	(Germany) Riller & Schnauck powered by Cerny Motorsport	BMW M4 GT4 Evo (G82)	9:00.421	11
14	SP4T	50	(Germany) Max Kruse Racing	Volkswagen Golf GTI Clubsport 24h	9:00.822	12
15	SP10 Pro-Am	187	(Germany) FK Performance Motorsport	BMW M4 GT4 (G82)	9:01.289	13
16	SP10 Am	180	(Germany) AV Racing by Black Falcon	BMW M4 GT4 Evo (G82)	9:01.823	14
17	Cup3 Pro	962	(Germany) W&S Motorsport	Porsche 718 Cayman GT4 RS Clubsport	9:02.310	15
18	Cup3 Pro	971	(Germany) Speedworxx Automotive	Porsche 718 Cayman GT4 RS Clubsport	9:02.511	16
19	SP4T	88	(Japan) Subaru Tecnica International	Subaru WRX STI GT N24	9:02.568	17
20	SP10 Pro-Am	90	(Germany) Teichmann Racing	Toyota GR Supra GT4 Evo2	9:05.377	18
21	Cup3 Pro	959	(Germany) SRS Team Sorg Rennsport	Porsche 718 Cayman GT4 RS Clubsport	9:05.403	19
22	SP10 Pro-Am	176	(Germany) PROsport-Racing	Mercedes-AMG GT4	9:07.200	20
23	SP10 Pro-Am	164	(Germany) W&S Motorsport	Porsche 718 Cayman GT4 RS Clubsport	9:08.499	21
24	SP10 Pro-Am	177	(Germany) Rebel Racing by Black Falcon	BMW M4 GT4 Evo (G82)	9:10.421	22
25	Cup2 Pro	919	(Germany) Team Clickvers.de	Porsche 911 GT3 Cup (992.1)	9:10.470	23
26	Cup3 Am	977	(Switzerland) BSL Racing Team	Porsche 718 Cayman GT4 RS Clubsport	9:12.601	24
27	Cup3 Pro	961	(Germany) W&S Motorsport	Porsche 718 Cayman GT4 RS Clubsport	9:15.435	25
28	Cup3 Pro	999	(Belgium) Mühlner Motorsport	Porsche 718 Cayman GT4 RS Clubsport	9:16.301	26
29	Cup2 Am	908	(Switzerland) Hofor Racing	Porsche 911 GT3 Cup (992.1)	9:16.535	27
30	SP10	170	(Japan) Toyo Tires with Ring Racing	Toyota GR Supra GT4 Evo2	9:16.876	28
31	Cup3 Pro	941	(Germany) Adrenalin Motorsport Team Mainhattan Wheels	Porsche 718 Cayman GT4 RS Clubsport	9:18.746	29
32	SP8T	59	(Germany) Dörr Motorsport	McLaren Artura Trophy Evo	9:19.364	30
33	SP4T	76	(Germany) Max Kruse Racing	Volkswagen Golf GTI Clubsport 24h	9:19.680	31
34	Cup3 Pro	979	(Germany) SRS Team Sorg Rennsport	Porsche 718 Cayman GT4 RS Clubsport	9:20.233	32
35	SP7	82	(Germany) Overtakerracing x tm-racing.org	Porsche 718 Cayman GT4 RS Clubsport	9:22.489	33
36	SP7	420	(Germany) Four Motors Bioconcept-Car	Porsche 718 Cayman GT4 RS Clubsport	9:22.858	34
37	Cup3 Pro	966	(Germany) asBest Racing	Porsche 718 Cayman GT4 RS Clubsport	9:23.415	35
38	TCR	776	(Germany) Sharky Racing	Audi RS 3 LMS TCR (2021)	9:24.293	36
39	Cup2 Am	13	(Germany) White Angel for Fly and Help	Porsche 911 GT3 Cup (992.1)	9:25.483	37
40	Cup3 Am	945	(Thailand) Renazzo Motorsport	Porsche 718 Cayman GT4 RS Clubsport	9:27.493	38
41	SP4T	302	(South Korea) Hyundai Motorsport N	Hyundai Elantra N1 RP	9:27.510	39
42	Cup3 Am	949	(Germany) SRS Team Sorg Rennsport	Porsche 718 Cayman GT4 RS Clubsport	9:27.775	40
43	SP10 Am	175	(Germany) PROsport-Racing	Mercedes-AMG GT4	9:28.248	41
44	Cup3 Am	982	(Germany) W&S Motorsport	Porsche 718 Cayman GT4 RS Clubsport	9:31.520	42
45	Cup3 Am	939	(Germany) Black Falcon Team Zimmermann	Porsche 718 Cayman GT4 RS Clubsport	9:33.394	43
46	SP2T	109	(Japan) Toyota Gazoo Rookie Racing	Toyota GR Yaris DAT Concept	9:38.354	44
47	Cup2 Pro	900	(Germany) Black Falcon Team Zimmermann	Porsche 911 GT3 Cup (992.1)	9:40.509	45
48	SP4T	303	(South Korea) Hyundai Motorsport N	Hyundai Elantra N1 RP	9:42.780	46
50	Cup3 Am	978	(Germany) KKrämer Racing	Porsche 718 Cayman GT4 RS Clubsport	9:43.553	47
51	SP10 Am	171	(Switzerland) BSL Racing Team	Porsche 718 Cayman GT4 RS Clubsport	9:43.845	48
52	Cup3 Pro	967	(United Kingdom) Breakell Racing	Porsche 718 Cayman GT4 RS Clubsport	9:47.005	49
53	SP10 Am	169	(Germany) Dörr Motorsport	Aston Martin Vantage AMR GT4	9:48.962	50
—	Cup3 Pro	952	(Germany) Smyrlis Racing	Porsche 718 Cayman GT4 RS Clubsport	9:49.028 (Note: Not all drivers managed to complete required laps in Qualifying sessions, but is allowed to take the grid based on posted Qualifying time.)	51
54	SP2T	110	(Japan) Toyota Gazoo Rookie Racing	Toyota GR Yaris DAT Concept	9:49.654	52
56	TCR	577	(Germany) asBest Racing	Cupra Leon Competición TCR	10:00.474	53
57	TCR	89	(Germany) KMA-Racing	Volkswagen Golf GTI TCR	10:10.722	54
58	SP3T	321	(Germany) KMA-Racing	Volkswagen Golf GTI TCR	10:10.722	55
59	SP3T	800	(Germany) asBest Racing	Volkswagen Golf GTI TCR	10:47.536	56
60	SP3T	300	(Germany) Ollis Garage Racing	Dacia Logan	11:03.438	57
61	SP2T	380	(Germany) Bitter Motorsport	Bitter Corsa	11:07.627	58
62	SP3T	317	(Germany) 2R Racing	Audi TT RS	11:09.658	59
63	SP3T	821	(Germany) Sharky Racing	Audi RS 3 LMS TCR (2017)	11:16.229	60
—	SP3T	808	(Germany) asBest Racing	Cupra León TCR	10:48.591	61 (Note: Required to start at the end of starting group due to speed limit violation.)
49	SP3T	10	(Germany) Max Kruse Racing	Volkswagen Golf GTI Clubsport 24h	9:43.173	62
4	Cup2 Pro	95	(Germany) Sante Royale Racing Team	Porsche 911 GT3 Cup (992.1)	8:40.085	63
—	SP10 Am	189	(Switzerland) Hofor Racing by Bonk Motorsport	BMW M4 GT4 Evo (G82)	9:27.579	64
55	Cup3 Am	969	(Germany) SRS Team Sorg Rennsport	Porsche 718 Cayman GT4 RS Clubsport	9:50.747	65
5	Cup2 Am	777	(Germany) RPM Racing	Porsche 911 GT3 Cup (992.1)	8:43.329	66
WD	AT2	146	(Singapore) Giti Tire Motorsport by WS Racing	Porsche 911 GT3 Cup (992.1)	10:33.208 (Note: Withdrew from race due to accident in Qualifying 1.)	NS

=== Starting Group 3 ===
Pos.	Class	No.	Team	Car	Fastest lap from Qualifying 1, 2 and 3	Grid
1	BMW M240i	195	(Germany) Adrenalin Motorsport Team Mainhattan Wheels	BMW M240i Racing (F22)	9:36.997	1
2	BMW M240i	650	(Germany) Adrenalin Motorsport Team Mainhattan Wheels	BMW M240i Racing (F22)	9:41.544	2
3	V6	448	(Germany) Overtakerracing x tm-racing.org	Porsche Cayman S	9:42.348	3
4	BMW M240i	652	(Germany) Adrenalin Motorsport Team Mainhattan Wheels	BMW M240i Racing (F22)	9:43.776	4
—	V6	415	(Germany) Köppen Motorsport	Porsche 911 Carrera	9:46.396	5
5	BMW M2 Racing	898	(Germany) Walkenhorst Motorsport	BMW M2 Racing (G87)	9:49.349	6
6	VT2 Hecka	500	(Germany) Adrenalin Motorsport Team Mainhattan Wheels	BMW 330i (G20)	9:52.741	7
7	VT2 Hecka	519	Ravenol Motorsport Japan	Toyota GR Supra (A90)	9:52.873	8
—	BMW M240i	665	(Singapore) Giti Tire Motorsport by WS Racing	BMW M240i Racing (F22)	9:55.852	9
8	BMW M240i	658	(Belgium) JJ Motorsport	BMW M240i Racing (F22)	9:55.941	10
9	BMW M240i	653	(Germany) Adrenalin Motorsport Team Mainhattan Wheels	BMW M240i Racing (F22)	9:56.794	11
10	BMW M240i	669	(Germany) Keeevin Motorsport	BMW M240i Racing (F22)	9:57.589	12
11	V5	444	(Germany) Adrenalin Motorsport Team Mainhattan Wheels	Porsche Cayman CM12	9:59.540	13
12	V6	396	(Germany) Adrenalin Motorsport Team Mainhattan Wheels	Porsche Cayman S	9:59.938	14
13	BMW M240i	677	(Germany) asBest Racing	BMW M240i Racing (F22)	10:04.678	15
14	BMW M240i	651	(Germany) Adrenalin Motorsport Team Mainhattan Wheels	BMW M240i Racing (F22)	10:08.546	16
15	BMW M2 Racing	878	(Germany) SRS Team Sorg Rennsport	BMW M2 Racing (G87)	10:11.722	17
16	BMW M240i	670	(Singapore) Giti Tire Motorsport by WS Racing	BMW M240i Racing (F22)	10:12.481	18
17	V6	418	(Germany) SRS Team Sorg Rennsport	Porsche Cayman S	10:12.539	19
18	VT2 Front	471	(Germany) Jung Motorsport	Cupra Leon KL	10:15.856	20
19	V5	440	(Germany) QTQ-Raceperformance	Porsche Cayman CQ11	10:17.558	21
20	VT2 Hecka	503	(Singapore) Giti Tire Motorsport by WS Racing	Toyota GR Supra (A90)	10:23.344	22
21	BMW 325i	100	(Germany) Pistorius by EiFelkind Racing	BMW 325i Racing (E90)	10:24.879	23
22	VT2 Front	474	(Germany) Time Attack Paderborn by GTÜ Wieseler	Volkswagen Golf Mk 7.5	10:25.572	24
23	VT2 Hecka	501	(Germany) Adrenalin Motorsport Team Mainhattan Wheels	BMW 330i (G20)	10:28.865	25
24	V6	410	(Germany) rent2Drive-racing	Porsche Cayman GTS	10:30.635	26
25	BMW M2 Racing	870	(Germany) Adrenalin Motorsport Team Mainhattan Wheels	BMW M2 Racing (G87)	10:35.274	27
26	VT2 Front	472	(Germany) Jung Motorsport	Cupra Leon KL	10:38.747	28
27	BMW M240i	667	(United Kingdom) Breakell Racing	BMW M240i Racing (F22)	10:46.754	29
28	VT2 Hecka	569	(Germany) NFR motorsports	BMW 330i (G20)	10:58.267	30
29	BMW 325i	108	(Germany) asBest Racing	BMW 325i Racing (E90)	10:58.699	31
30	VT2 Hecka	505	(Germany) Keeevin Motorsport	BMW 328i (F30)	11:06.774	32
31	BMW 325i	101	(Germany) EiFelkind Racing	BMW 325i Racing (E90)	11:18.431	33
32	SP4	152	(Germany) Oepen Motors Automobilsport	BMW 346C	11:20.306	34
33	SP3	277	(Germany) Ravenol Motorsport by MDM Racing	BMW 318ti	11:35.917	35
—	VT2 Hecka	524	(Germany) SRS Team Sorg Rennsport	Toyota GR Supra (A90)	10:47.966	36
—	VT2 Hecka	520	(Japan) Toyo Tires with Ring Racing	Toyota GR Supra (A90)	10:25.715	37
—	VT2 Front	480	(Germany) Dupré Engineering	Audi S3 Saloon (8Y)	9:53.229	38
—	V5	454	(Germany) Pure Racing	Porsche Cayman CM12	10:37.937	39
—	V5	455	(Germany) Pure Racing	Porsche Cayman CM12	10:40.144	40
—	VT2 Hecka	514	(Germany) SRS Team Sorg Rennsport	BMW 330i (G20)	9:54.506	41
—	BMW 325i	112	(Germany) JS Competition	BMW 325i Racing (E90)	10:36.073	42
34	VT2 Front	477	(Germany) asBest Racing	Volkswagen Scirocco	12:07.784	43
—	V5	445	(Germany) rent2Drive-racing	Porsche Cayman CM12	11:05.048	44
WD	BMW M2 Racing	899	(Germany) W&S Motorsport	BMW M2 Racing (G87)	9:52.054 (Note: Withdrew from race due to accident in Qualifying 3.)	NS

== Race result ==
- Class winners are denoted in **bold** and with ‡.
- Drivers in italics were entered in cars that completed the race, however did not complete the required 2 laps to be classified as a finisher.
- The minimum number of laps for classification at the finish (50% of the overall race winner's distance) was 78 laps.

Pos	Class	No	Team/Entrant	Drivers	Vehicle	Laps	Time/Retired
1	**SP 9 Pro**	**80**	**(United States) Mercedes-AMG Team Ravenol**	**(Germany) Maro Engel** **(Belgium) Maxime Martin** **(Germany) Fabian Schiller** **(Germany) Luca Stolz**	**Mercedes-AMG GT3 Evo**	**156**	**24:05:27.664‡**
2	SP 9 Pro	34	(Germany) natural elements by Walkenhorst Motorsport	(Italy) Mattia Drudi (Norway) Christian Krognes (Denmark) Nicki Thiim (Germany) Felipe Fernández Laser	Aston Martin Vantage AMR GT3 Evo	156	+2:28.750
3	SP 9 Pro	99	(Germany) Rowe Racing	(United Kingdom) Dan Harper (Germany) Max Hesse (South Africa) Sheldon van der Linde (Belgium) Dries Vanthoor	BMW M4 GT3 Evo	156	+2:46.074
4	**SP-X Pro**	**81**	**(Germany) Schubert Motorsport**	**(United States) Connor De Phillippi** **(Belgium) Ugo de Wilde** **(Germany) Jens Klingmann** **(United States) Neil Verhagen**	**BMW M3 Touring 24H**	**156**	**+4:43.814‡**
5	SP 9 Pro	24	(Germany) Lionspeed GP	(Switzerland) Ricardo Feller (Germany) Laurin Heinrich (Belgium) Laurens Vanthoor	Porsche 911 GT3 R (992.2)	156	+7:50.506
6	SP 9 Pro	54	(Italy) Dinamic GT	(Denmark) Bastian Buus (Denmark) Michael Christensen (Netherlands) Loek Hartog (Germany) Joel Sturm	Porsche 911 GT3 R (992.2)	155	+1 lap
7	SP 9 Pro	67	(Germany) HRT Ford Racing	(Germany) Christopher Mies (Norway) Dennis Olsen (Germany) Frank Stippler (Belgium) Frédéric Vervisch	Ford Mustang GT3 Evo	155	+1 lap
8	SP 9 Pro	77	(Germany) Schubert Motorsport	(Austria) Philipp Eng (Netherlands) Robin Frijns (Belgium) Charles Weerts (Germany) Marco Wittmann	BMW M4 GT3 Evo	154	+2 laps
9	**SP 9 Pro-Am**	**48**	**(Germany) 48LOSCH Motorsport by Black Falcon**	**(Netherlands) "Daan Arrow"** **(Germany) Patrick Assenheimer** **(Germany) Tobias Müller** **(Luxembourg) Dylan Pereira**	**Porsche 911 GT3 R (992.2)**	**154**	**+2 laps‡**
10	SP 9 Pro-Am	18	(Germany) Lionspeed GP	(United Kingdom) Jake Hill (Austria) Max Hofer (Germany) Patrick Kolb (United Kingdom) Kyle Tilley	Porsche 911 GT3 R (992.2)	153	+3 laps
11	SP 9 Pro-Am	123	(Belgium) Mühlner Motorsport	(United Kingdom) Alex Brundle (Germany) Ben Bünnagel (Estonia) Martin Rump	Porsche 911 GT3 R (992.2)	153	+3 laps
12	SP 9 Pro-Am	30	(South Korea) Hankook Competition	(South Korea) Roelof Bruins (Canada) Steven Cho (South Korea) Jongkyum Kim (Germany) Marco Seefried	Porsche 911 GT3 R (992.2)	151	+5 laps
13	SP 9 Pro-Am	4	(Armenia) Goroyan RT by Car Collection	(France) Nathanaël Berthon (Switzerland) Alex Fontana (Armenia) Artur Goroyan (Kyrgyzstan) Oleg Kvitka	Porsche 911 GT3 R (992.2)	150	+6 laps
14	SP 9 Pro-Am	86	(Denmark) High Class Racing	(Denmark) Anders Fjordbach (United Kingdom) Harry King (China) Kerong Li (China) Leo Ye Hongli	Porsche 911 GT3 R (992.2)	150	+6 laps
15	SP 9 Pro	69	(Germany) Dörr Motorsport	(Germany) Ben Dörr (Germany) Timo Glock (Germany) Marvin Kirchhöfer (Germany) Timo Scheider	McLaren 720S GT3 Evo	150	+6 laps
16	SP 9 Pro-Am	32	(Japan) Toyo Tires with Ring Racing	(Germany) Andreas Gülden (Japan) Yuichi Nakayama (Germany) Tim Sandtler	Mercedes-AMG GT3 Evo	149	+7 laps
17	**Cup2 Pro**	**900**	**(Germany) Black Falcon Team Zimmermann**	**(Germany) Alexander Hardt** **(Chile) Benjamín Hites** **(Germany) Benjamin Koslowski** **(Netherlands) Paul Meijer**	**Porsche 911 GT3 Cup (992.1)**	**148**	**+8 laps‡**
18	Cup2 Pro	902	(Germany) Team Liqui Moly by Black Falcon	(United States) Ryan Harrison (Germany) Noah Nagelsdiek (Austria) Raphael Rennhofer (Germany) Leon Wassertheurer	Porsche 911 GT3 Cup (992.1)	148	+8 laps
19	**SP 9 Am**	**5**	**(Germany) Black Falcon Team EAE**	**(Germany) Thomas Kiefer** **(Turkey) Mustafa Mehmet Kaya** **(Italy) Gabriele Piana** **(Germany) Mike Stursberg**	**Porsche 911 GT3 R (992.2)**	**147**	**+9 laps‡**
20	**Cup2 Am**	**777**	**(Germany) RPM Racing**	**(Germany) Philip Hamprecht** **(Netherlands) Patrick Huisman** **(Sweden) Niclas Jönsson** **(United States) Tracy Krohn**	**Porsche 911 GT3 Cup (992.1)**	**146**	**+10 laps‡**
21	Cup2 Am	904	(Belgium) Mühlner Motorsport	(Hungary) Adam Benko (Germany) Moritz Kranz (Hungary) Csaba Walter (Slovakia) Antal Zsigó	Porsche 911 GT3 Cup (992.1)	145	+11 laps
22	SP 9 Pro-Am	71	(Lithuania) Juta Racing	(Germany) Otto Blank (Germany) Björn Grossmann (Germany) Christer Jöns (Germany) Pierre Kaffer	Audi R8 LMS Evo II	143	+13 laps
23	**SP 10**	**145**	**(Germany) Riller & Schnauck powered by Cerny Motorsport**	**(France) Joshua Bednarski** **(Netherlands) Jeroen Bleekemolen** **(United Kingdom) Peter Cate** **(Germany) Tom Schütze**	**BMW M4 GT4 Evo (G82)**	**143**	**+13 laps‡**
24	**Cup3 Pro**	**962**	**(Germany) W&S Motorsport**	**(Germany) Moritz Oberheim** **(Finland) Philip Miemois** **(Germany) Lorenz Stegmann** **(Germany) Niclas Wiedmann**	**Porsche 718 Cayman GT4 RS Clubsport**	**142**	**+14 laps‡**
25	Cup2 Pro	925	(Germany) Huber Motorsport	(United States) Christopher Allen (United States) Jaden Lander (United States) Jon Miller (Germany) Hans Wehrmann	Porsche 911 GT3 Cup (992.1)	142	+14 laps
26	SP 10	888	(Switzerland) Hofor Racing by Bonk Motorsport	(Germany) Max Partl (Germany) Michael Schrey (Germany) Philip Wiskirchen (Germany) Thorsten Wolter	BMW M4 GT4 Evo (G82)	142	+14 laps
27	Cup3 Pro	971	(Germany) Speedworxx Automotive	(Germany) Erik Braun (Germany) Alexander Fielenbach (Germany) Franz Linden (Norway) Oskar Sandberg	Porsche 718 Cayman GT4 RS Clubsport	142	+14 laps
28	SP 10	176	(Germany) PROsport-Racing	(Germany) Yannik Himmels (Spain) Lluc Ibàñez (Portugal) Guilherme Oliveira (Germany) Jörg Viebahn	Mercedes-AMG GT4	141	+15 laps
29	Cup3 Pro	961	(Germany) W&S Motorsport	(China) Chao Lu (Czech Republic) Michal Makeš (Germany) Marius Rauer (China) Zhang Zhendong	Porsche 718 Cayman GT4 RS Clubsport	139	+17 laps
30	**SP 4T**	**88**	**(Japan) Subaru Tecnica International**	**(Netherlands) Carlo van Dam** **(Japan) Takuto Iguchi** **(Japan) Rintaro Kubo** **(Japan) Kota Sasaki**	**Subaru WRX STI GT N24**	**139**	**+17 laps‡**
31	Cup3 Pro	999	(Belgium) Mühlner Motorsport	(Germany) Matthias Beckwermert (Canada) Maxwell Polzler (Germany) Kai Riemer (Germany) Christopher Rink	Porsche 718 Cayman GT4 RS Clubsport	138	+18 laps
32	**Cup3 Am**	**982**	**(Germany) W&S Motorsport**	**(Germany) Axel Duffner** **(Germany) Christoph Krombach** **(Germany) Oliver Kunz** **(Germany) Leo-Livius Arne Weber**	**Porsche 718 Cayman GT4 RS Clubsport**	**137**	**+19 laps‡**
33	Cup2 Pro	919	(Germany) Team Clickvers.de	(Germany) Robin Chrzanowski (Germany) Kersten Jodexnis (Germany) Richard-Sven Jodexnis (New Zealand) Peter Scharmach	Porsche 911 GT3 Cup (992.1)	137	+19 laps
34	Cup3 Am	949	(Germany) SRS Team Sorg Rennsport	(Sweden) Tommy Gråberg (India) Akshay Gupta (Germany) Björn Simon (Germany) Aaron Wenisch	Porsche 718 Cayman GT4 RS Clubsport	137	+19 laps
35	Cup3 Am	939	(Germany) Black Falcon Team Zimmermann	(Germany) Alexander Kroker (Germany) Anton Ruf (Germany) Axel Sartingen (Germany) Nils Schwenk	Porsche 718 Cayman GT4 RS Clubsport	137	+19 laps
36	SP 9 Pro	3	(Netherlands) Mercedes-AMG Team Verstappen Racing	(Austria) Lucas Auer (Andorra) Jules Gounon (Spain) Daniel Juncadella (Netherlands) Max Verstappen	Mercedes-AMG GT3 Evo	135	+21 laps
37	SP 10	171	(Switzerland) BSL Racing Team	(Switzerland) Philipp Hagnauer (Germany) Arno Klasen (Sweden) Eric Ullström (Switzerland) Alexander Walker	Porsche 718 Cayman GT4 RS Clubsport	135	+21 laps
38	Cup3 Am	945	(Thailand) Renazzo Motorsport	(Germany) Alexander Meixner (Germany) Markus Nölken (Germany) Ulrich Daniel Nölken (Japan) Kouichi Okumura	Porsche 718 Cayman GT4 RS Clubsport	135	+21 laps
39	AT2	320	(Germany) Four Motors Bioconcept-Car	(Denmark) Henrik Bollerslev (Argentina) Nano López (Germany) "Smudo" (Netherlands) Marco van Ramshorst	Porsche 911 GT3 Cup (992.1)	134	+22 laps
40	Cup2 Am	13	(Germany) White Angel for Fly and Help	(Germany) Bernd Albrecht (Germany) Kurt Ecke (Germany) Andreas Sczepansky (Germany) Mike Jäger	Porsche 911 GT3 Cup (992.1)	134	+22 laps
41	SP 10	170	(Japan) Toyo Tires with Ring Racing	(France) Giuliano Alesi (Japan) Kazuto Kotaka (Japan) Miki Koyama (Japan) Shunji Okumoto	Toyota GR Supra GT4 Evo2	134	+22 laps
42	SP 10	164	(Germany) W&S Motorsport	(Germany) Stephan Brodmerkel (Germany) Hendrik Still (Austria) Constantin Schöll (Germany) Jürgen Vöhringer	Porsche 718 Cayman GT4 RS Clubsport	133	+23 laps
43	**SP 7**	**91**	**(Austria) Reiter Engineering**	**(Germany) Matthias Benndorf** **(Germany) Lukas Ertl** **(Germany) Maximilian Ertl** **(Germany) Stefan Ertl**	**Porsche 991 GT3 II Cup**	**133**	**+23 laps‡**
44	**M2**	**878**	**(Germany) SRS Team Sorg Rennsport**	**(Germany) Darian Donkel** **(Germany) Maximilian Hill** **(Belgium) Tim Peeters** **(Germany) Max Schlichenmeier**	**BMW M2 Racing (G87)**	**132**	**+24 laps‡**
45	Cup2 Am	909	(Germany) KKrämer Racing	(Switzerland) Michelangelo Comazzi (Germany) Karsten Krämer (France) Leo Messenger (Germany) Peter Sander	Porsche 911 GT3 Cup (992.1)	132	+24 laps
46	SP 7	420	(Germany) Four Motors Bioconcept-Car	(Germany) Henning Cramer (Germany) Georg Kiefer (Switzerland) Marc Schöni (Germany) Oliver Sprungmann	Porsche 718 Cayman GT4 RS Clubsport	131	+25 laps
47	SP-X Pro	61	(Germany) HWA Engineering Speed	(United States) Adam Adelson (Germany) Lance David Arnold (United Kingdom) Jamie Green (Netherlands) Renger van der Zande	Mercedes-Benz 190E HWA EVO.R	131	+25 laps
48	Cup 3 Pro	959	(Germany) SRS Team Sorg Rennsport	(Germany) Heiko Eichenberg (Germany) Fabio Grosse (Switzerland) Patrik Grütter (United Kingdom) Harley Haughton	Porsche 718 Cayman GT4 RS Clubsport	131	+25 laps
49	**VTH**	**500**	**(Germany) Adrenalin Motorsport Team Mainhattan Wheels**	**(Germany) Philipp Leisen** **(Germany) Philipp Stahlschmidt** **(Germany) "Sub7BTG"** **(Germany) Daniel Zils**	**BMW 330i (G20)**	**130**	**+26 laps‡**
50	**M240i**	**650**	**(Germany) Adrenalin Motorsport Team Mainhattan Wheels**	**(Germany) Benjamin Albers** **(Argentina) Santiago Baztarrica** **(Germany) Yannick Fübrich** **(Germany) Sven Markert**	**BMW M240i Racing (F22)**	**130**	**+26 laps‡**
51	M240i	665	(Singapore) Giti Tire Motorsport by WS Racing	(Germany) Jannik Reinhard (Germany) Ulf Steffens (Germany) Jan Ullrich (Netherlands) John van der Sanden	BMW M240i Racing (F22)	130	+26 laps
52	M240i	669	(Germany) Keeevin Motorsport GmbH	(Turkey) Zeynel Babacan (Germany) Maximilian Kurz (Germany) Riccardo Petrolo	BMW M240i Racing (F22)	129	+27 laps
53	Cup3 Pro	979	(Germany) SRS Team Sorg Rennsport	(United States) Seth Brown (Germany) Christian Coen (Germany) "Maximilian" (Canada) Damon Surzyshyn	Porsche 718 Cayman GT4 RS Clubsport	129	+27 laps
54	M240i	652	(Germany) Adrenalin Motorsport Team Mainhattan Wheels	(France) Grégoire Boutonnet (France) Laurent Laparra (Ukraine) Oleg Kravets (Romania) Aldrin Opran	BMW M240i Racing (F22)	129	+27 laps
55	**SP-Pro**	**992**	**(Germany) Manthey Team eFuel Griesemann**	**(Germany) Dirk Adorf** **(Germany) Björn Griesemann** **(Germany) Georg Griesemann** **(Germany) Marco Holzer**	**Porsche 992 GT3 Cup MR**	**128**	**+28 laps‡**
56	Cup2 Pro	95	(Germany) Sante Royale Racing Team	(Germany) David Kiefer (Germany) Marius Kiefer (Germany) Stefan Kiefer (Austria) Luca Rettenbacher	Porsche 911 GT3 Cup (992.1)	128	+28 laps
57	VTH	524	(Germany) SRS Team Sorg Rennsport	(Germany) Mathias Baar (Germany) Maximilian Eisberg (Netherlands) Piet-Jan Ooms (Japan) Yutaka Seki	Toyota GR Supra (A90)	128	+28 laps
58	**SP 3T**	**317**	**(Germany) 2R Racing**	**(Germany) Wolfgang Haugg** **(Germany) Thorsten Jung** **(Germany) Dirk Vleugels** **(Germany) Roland Waschkau**	**Audi TT RS**	**128**	**+28 laps‡**
59	**V6**	**448**	**(Germany) Overtakerracing x tm-racing.org**	**(Germany) Christian Knötschke** **(Germany) Torsten Krey** **(Germany) Alexander Müller** **(Germany) Christian Weber**	**Porsche Cayman S**	**128**	**+28 laps‡**
60	V6	415	(Germany) Köppen Motorsport	(Germany) Bastian Arend (Germany) Maximilian Arnold (Germany) Alexander Köppen (Germany) Sebastian Rings	Porsche 911 Carrera	128	+28 laps
61	**VTF**	**474**	**(Germany) Time Attack Paderborn by GTÜ Wieseler**	**(Germany) Fritz Hebig** **(Switzerland) Boris Hrubesch** **(Germany) Fabian Tillmann** **(Germany) Michael Wolpertinger**	**Volkswagen Golf Mk 7.5**	**127**	**+29 laps‡**
62	VTH	519	Ravenol Motorsport Japan	(Germany) Manfred Röss (Germany) Matthias Röss (Germany) Malte Tack	Toyota GR Supra (A90)	127	+29 laps
63	VTH	520	(Japan) Toyo Tires with Ring Racing	(Japan) Jin Horino (Japan) Masato Kawabata (Japan) Hokuto Matsuyama (Japan) Takuma Miyazono	Toyota GR Supra (A90)	127	+29 laps
64	**AT1**	**19**	**(Germany) Max Kruse Racing**	**(Netherlands) Tom Coronel** **(Netherlands) Duncan Huisman** **(Germany) Christian Kohlhaas** **(Netherlands) Jan Jaap van Roon**	**Audi R8 LMS Evo II**	**127**	**+29 laps‡**
65	**V5**	**444**	**(Germany) Adrenalin Motorsport Team Mainhattan Wheels**	**(Germany) Daniel Korn** **(Germany) Tobias Korn** **(Germany) Ulrich Korn** **(Moldova) Serghei Levlev**	**Porsche Cayman CM12**	**126**	**+30 laps‡**
66	M240i	651	(Germany) Adrenalin Motorsport Team Mainhattan Wheels	(United States) Johnny Huang (China) Ke Shao (United States) Nico Silva (Germany) Kevin Wambach	BMW M240i Racing (F22)	126	+30 laps
67	M240i	670	(Singapore) Giti Tire Motorsport by WS Racing	(France) Valentin Belgy (Germany) Michael Bräutigam (Germany) Dennis Garbe (France) Adrien Paviot	BMW M240i Racing (F22)	126	+30 laps
68	**TCR**	**830**	**(South Korea) Hyundai Motorsport N**	**(Spain) Mikel Azcona** **(Germany) Marc Basseng** **(Germany) Nico Bastian** **(Germany) Manuel Lauck**	**Hyundai Elantra N TCR (2024)**	**125**	**+31 laps‡**
69	VTF	471	(Germany) Jung Motorsport	(Germany) Michael Eichhorn (United States) Tony Roma (Germany) Andreas Winterwerber	Cupra Leon KL	124	+32 laps
70	TCR	89	(Germany) KMA-Racing	(Germany) Dirk Groneck (Germany) Maik Knappmeier (Germany) Marco Knappmeier	Volkswagen Golf GTI TCR	124	+32 laps
71	SP-X	62	(Germany) HWA Engineering Speed	(United States) Adam Adelson (Germany) Sebastian Asch (Germany) Luca Ludwig (Germany) Markus Winkelhock	Mercedes-Benz 190E HWA EVO.R	123	+33 laps
72	**325i**	**100**	**(Germany) Pistorius by EiFelkind Racing**	**(Austria) Markus Fischer** **(Germany) Oliver Frisse** **(Germany) Christopher Gruber** **(Germany) Henning Hausmeier**	**BMW 325i Racing (E90)**	**123**	**+33 laps‡**
73	V6	418	(Germany) SRS Team Sorg Rennsport	(Germany) Tabea Jünger (Mexico) Xavier Lamadrid (Australia) César Mendieta (Mexico) Luis Ramírez	Porsche Cayman S	123	+33 laps
74	SP 3T	321	(Germany) Sharky Racing	(Germany) Danny Brink (Germany) Finn Mache (Germany) Joris Primke (Germany) Moritz Rosenbach	Volkswagen Golf GTI TCR	122	+34 laps
75	V5	454	(Germany) Pure Racing	(Austria) Peter Baumann (Germany) Andreas Hansen (Germany) Jan Hendrik Heimbach (Germany) John Lee Schambony	Porsche Cayman CM12	122	+34 laps
76	SP 10	177	(Germany) Rebel Racing by Black Falcon	(United States) Malcolm Harrison (Romania) Sergiu Nicolae (United States) Mark Smith (Romania) Alexandru Vasilescu	BMW M4 GT4 Evo (G82)	121	+35 laps
77	V5	440	(Germany) aQTQ-Raceperformance	(Switzerland) Mirco Böhmisch (Germany) Florian Ebener (Germany) Andreas Müller (Germany) Florian Quante	Porsche Cayman CQ11	121	+35 laps
78	M240i	653	(Germany) Adrenalin Motorsport Team Mainhattan Wheels	(Italy) Edoardo Bugane (United Kingdom) "Farquini" (United Kingdom) Ben Pitch (Belgium) Axel Soyez	BMW M240i Racing (F22)	120	+36 laps
79	VTF	472	(Germany) Jung Motorsport	(Germany) Marc Etzkorn (Germany) Lars Füting (Germany) Marcel Müller (Thailand) Thanathip Thanalapanan	Cupra Leon KL	120	+36 laps
80	SP 3T	821	(Germany) Sharky Racing	(Germany) Stephan Epp (Germany) Mats Heidler (Germany) René Steiger (Germany) Alexander Weber	Audi RS 3 LMS TCR (2017)	119	+37 laps
81	SP 4T	50	(Germany) Max Kruse Racing	(Germany) Heiko Hammel (Sweden) Johan Kristoffersson (Germany) Benjamin Leuchter (Germany) Nicholas Otto	Volkswagen Golf GTI Clubsport 24h	118	+38 laps
82	Cup3 Am	969	(Germany) SRS Team Sorg Rennsport	(United States) Joshua Jacobs (New Zealand) Guy Stewart (Germany) Kurt Strube (Austria) Bernhard Wagner	Porsche 718 Cayman GT4 RS Clubsport	118	+38 laps
83	SP 3T	10	(Germany) Max Kruse Racing	(Germany) Jens Dralle (Germany) Max Kruse (Switzerland) Christoph Lenz (Germany) Matthias Wasel	Volkswagen Golf GTI Clubsport 24h	118	+38 laps
84	V5	455	(Germany) Pure Racing	(Austria) Peter Baumann (Germany) Thorsten Held (Germany) John Lee Schambony (Germany) Matthias Trinius	Porsche Cayman CM12	117	+39 laps
85	M2	870	(Germany) Adrenalin Motorsport Team Mainhattan Wheels	(Japan) Ryusho Konishi (Germany) Alesia Kreutzpointner (Germany) Jacqueline Kreutzpointner (China) Yunfeng Zou	BMW M2 Racing (G87)	117	+39 laps
86	VTH	514	(Germany) SRS Team Sorg Rennsport	(Italy) Alberto Carobbio (Germany) Calvin De Groot (Germany) Heinz Jürgen Kroner (Italy) Ugo Vicenzi	BMW 330i (G20)	117	+39 laps
87	Cup3 Pro	967	(United Kingdom) Breakell Racing	(United Kingdom) Josh Hislop (United Kingdom) Pippa Mann (United Kingdom) Martin Rich (Morocco) Karim Sekkat	Porsche 718 Cayman GT4 RS Clubsport	116	+40 laps
88	SP 3T	800	(Germany) asBest Racing	(Germany) Thomas Ardelt (Germany) Manuel Dormagen (Germany) Tim Lukas Müller (Germany) Sven Oepen	Volkswagen Golf GTI TCR	115	+41 laps
89	M2	898	(Germany) Walkenhorst Motorsport	(Germany) Maxim Felix Dacher (Germany) Bennet Ehrl (Japan) Takayuki Kinoshita (United States) Tazio Ottis	BMW M2 Racing (G87)	115	+41 laps
90	V5	445	(Germany) rent2Drive-racing	(Germany) Philip Ade (Germany) Georg Arbinger (France) Joël Le Bihan (Germany) Jan Karsten Welker	Porsche Cayman CM12	115	+41 laps
91	TCR	577	(Germany) asBest Racing	(Germany) Dennis Leissing (Germany) Lutz Obermann (Germany) Max Rosam (Germany) Mark Trompeter	Cupra Leon Competición TCR	114	+42 laps
92	325i	101	(Germany) EiFelkind Racing	(Poland) Sebastian Lawniczek (Germany) Nils Renken (Germany) Marco Schmitz (Germany) Tim Schwolow	BMW 325i Racing (E90)	114	+42 laps
93	VTF	480	(Germany) Dupré Engineering	(Germany) Christoph Dupré (Germany) Joachim Nett (Germany) Jürgen Nett	Audi S3 Saloon (8Y)	113	+43 laps
94	M240i	667	(United Kingdom) Breakell Racing	(United Kingdom) James Breakell (Spain) Álvaro Fontes (Republic of Ireland) Aidan Mulready (Germany) Andreas Simon	BMW M240i Racing (F22)	113	+43 laps
95	VTH	505	(Germany) Keeevin Motorsport	(Germany) Matthias Aretz (Poland) Nikodem Silecki (Germany) Daniel Sowada (Germany) Serge Van Vooren	BMW 328i (F30)	111	+45 laps
96	**SP 4**	**152**	**(Germany) Oepen Motors Automobilsport**	**(Germany) Christian Koger** **(Germany) Henrik Launhardt** **(Germany) Ingo Oepen**	**BMW 346C**	**111**	**+45 laps‡**
97	SP-X	63	(Germany) HWA Engineering Speed	(Germany) Christian Gebhardt (Norway) Evald Holstad (United States) Peter Ludwig (Canada) Bruno Spengler	Mercedes-Benz 190E HWA EVO.R	109	+47 laps
98	SP 9 Am	40	(Netherlands) W.I.S. Racing Team powered by Koopman Racing	(Mexico) Juan Carlos Carmona (Germany) Michael Funke (Germany) Peter Posavac (Germany) Volker Strycek	BMW Z4 GT3	109	+47 laps
99	**SP 2T**	**380**	**(Germany) Bitter Motorsport**	**(Germany) Björn Morhin** **(Germany) Christian Schäffer** **(Germany) Jan Soumagne** **(Germany) Volker Strycek**	**Bitter Corsa**	**109**	**+47 laps‡**
100	SP 9 Pro-Am	11	(Germany) SR Motorsport by Schnitzelalm	(Switzerland) Philip Ellis (Germany) Jannes Fittje (Germany) Jay Mo Härtling (Germany) Kenneth Heyer	Mercedes-AMG GT3 Evo	108	+48 laps
101	SP 10	180	(Germany) AV Racing by Black Falcon	(United States) Judson Holt (United States) Dave Ogburn (United States) Denny Stripling (United States) Charles Turner	BMW M4 GT4 Evo (G82)	106	+50 laps
102	Cup3 Pro	941	(Germany) Adrenalin Motorsport Team Mainhattan Wheels	(Germany) Jacob Erlbacher (Germany) Adrian Rziczny (Netherlands) Mark van der Snel (Netherlands) Max van der Snel	Porsche 718 Cayman GT4 RS Clubsport	105	+51 laps
103	VTF	477	(Germany) asBest Racing	(Germany) Bastian Beck (Germany) Sascha Korte (Germany) Michael Lachmayer (Germany) Thomas Mennecke	Volkswagen Scirocco	99	+57 laps
104	325i	108	(Germany) asBest Racing	(Germany) Richard Bäther (Germany) Sarah Ganser (Switzerland) Marco Grilli (Germany) Alex Schneider	BMW 325i Racing (E90)	97	+59 laps
105	SP 9 Am	36	(Germany) Saugmotoren Motorsport | 3M	(Germany) Valentin Lachenmayer (Germany) Julian Reeh (Germany) Christian Scherer (Germany) Henry Walkenhorst	BMW Z4 GT3	95	+61 laps
106	SP 3T	300	(Germany) Ollis Garage Racing	(Germany) Alexander Becker (Germany) Christian Geilfus (Germany) Oliver Kriese (Germany) Robert Neumann	Dacia Logan	92	+64 laps
107	SP 4T	302	(South Korea) Hyundai Motorsport N	(Spain) Mikel Azcona (South Korea) Youngchan Kim (Germany) Manuel Lauck (Germany) Mark Wallenwein	Hyundai Elantra N1 RP	91	+65 laps
108	SP 4T	303	(South Korea) Hyundai Motorsport N	(South Korea) Gyumin Kim (Puerto Rico) Carlos José Sepúlveda (South Korea) Woojin Shin (Germany) Mark Wallenwein	Hyundai Elantra N1 RP	90	+66 laps
109	Cup3 Am	978	(Germany) KKrämer Racing	(Germany) Olaf Baunack (Germany) Mario Handrick (Germany) Marco Lamsouguer (Germany) Michael Mönch	Porsche 718 Cayman GT4 RS Clubsport	86	+70 laps
110	**SP 8T**	**59**	**(Germany) Dörr Motorsport**	**(Germany) Phil Dörr** **(Germany) Guido Naumann** **(Germany) Sven Schädler** **(Germany) Frank Weishar**	**McLaren Artura Trophy Evo**	**84**	**+72 laps‡**
NC	SP 2T	109	(Japan) Toyota Gazoo Rookie Racing	(Japan) "Morizo" (Japan) Hiroaki Ishiura (Japan) Kazuya Oshima (Japan) Daisuke Toyoda	Toyota GR Yaris DAT Concept	77	Not Classified
NC	VTH	569	(Germany) NFR motorsports	(Germany) Benny Baller (Netherlands) Max de Bruijn (Germany) Stefan Gaukler (Netherlands) Lars van 't Veer	BMW 330i (G20)	54	Not Classified
NC	VTH	501	(Germany) Adrenalin Motorsport Team Mainhattan Wheels	(Germany) Jürgen Huber (Germany) Marvin Kobus (Germany) Christoph Merkt (Germany) Hermann Vortkamp	BMW 330i (G20)	51	Not Classified
NC	SP 2T	110	(Japan) Toyota Gazoo Rookie Racing	(Japan) "Morizo" (Japan) Masahiro Sasaki (Japan) Kazuya Oshima (Japan) Daisuke Toyoda	Toyota GR Yaris DAT Concept	15	Not Classified
DNF	SP 9 Pro	55	(Italy) Dinamic GT	(Italy) Michele Beretta (France) Alessandro Ghiretti (Netherlands) Loek Hartog (Germany) Joel Sturm	Porsche 911 GT3 R (992.2)	149	Did not finish
DNF	SP 10	90	(Germany) Teichmann Racing	(Belgium) Lucas Cartelle (France) Edgar Pierre (Spain) Javier Sagrera (Germany) Hugo Schwarze	Toyota GR Supra GT4 Evo2	130	Did not finish
DNF	SP 9 Pro	130	(Germany) Schaeffler Team Abt	(Italy) Marco Mapelli (Netherlands) Nicky Catsburg (United Kingdom) Nick Yelloly	Lamborghini Huracán GT3 Evo 2	128	Did not finish
DNF	SP 9 Am	8	(Lithuania) Juta Racing	(Germany) Elia Erhart (Kyrgyzstan) "Selv" (Germany) Alexey Veremenko	Audi R8 LMS Evo II	123	Did not finish
DNF	Cup2 Pro	918	(Belgium) Mühlner Motorsport	(Germany) Michael Rebhan (Germany) Nick Salewsky (Germany) Tim Scheerbarthh (Denmark) Michelle Gatting	Porsche 911 GT3 Cup (992.1)	123	Did not finish
DNF	Cup3 Am	977	(Switzerland) BSL Racing Team	(Switzerland) Marc Arn (Switzerland) Philipp Frommenwiler (Germany) Christoph Ruhrmann (Switzerland) Marcel Zimmermann	Porsche 718 Cayman GT4 RS Clubsport	117	Did not finish
DNF	SP 9 Pro	26	(Germany) PROsport Racing Team Bilstein	(Germany) Marek Böckmann (United Kingdom) Adam Christodoulou (Canada) Mikaël Grenier (United Kingdom) Chris Lulham	Mercedes-AMG GT3 Evo	115	Did not finish
DNF	Cup3 Pro	966	(Germany) asBest Racing	(Germany) Leonard Oehme (Germany) Moritz Oehme (Germany) Jan-Niklas Stieler (Lithuania) Kasparas Vingilis	Porsche 718 Cayman GT4 RS Clubsport	110	Did not finish
DNF	TCR	776	(Germany) Sharky Racing	(Germany) Philipp Eis (Italy) Gian Maria Gabbiani (Sweden) Mikaela Åhlin-Kottulinsky (Latvia) Ivars Vallers	Audi RS 3 LMS TCR (2021)	110	Did not finish
DNF	M240i	658	(Belgium) JJ Motorsport	(Belgium) Hakan Sari (Belgium) Recep Sari (Belgium) Jarno Dhauw	BMW M240i Racing (F22)	109	Did not finish
DNF	SP 7	81	(Germany) Overtakerracing x tm-racing.org	(Germany) Sebastian Brandl (Poland) Jacek Pydys (Germany) Michael Schröder (Germany) Marco Vitonelli	Porsche 718 Cayman GT4 RS Clubsport	97	Did not finish
DNF	V6	396	(Germany) Adrenalin Motorsport Team Mainhattan Wheels	(Spain) Carlos Arimón (Germany) Christian Büllesbach (Germany) Klaus Fassbender (Germany) Andreas Schettler	Porsche Cayman S	95	Did not finish
DNF	SP 9 Am	37	(Germany) PROsport Racing	(Belgium) Guido Dumarey (Germany) Christian Konnerth (Germany) Markus Lönnroth (Germany) Tobias Wahl	Aston Martin Vantage AMR GT3	92	Did not finish
DNF	Cup2 Am	908	(Switzerland) Hofor Racing	(Switzerland) Michael Kroll (Germany) Torsten Kratz (Germany) Thomas Mühlenz (Switzerland) Alexander Prinz	Porsche 911 GT3 Cup (992.1)	78	Did not finish
DNF	SP 10	169	(Germany) Dörr Motorsport	(France) Philippe Charlaix (Germany) Heiko Hahn (Germany) Peter Sander (Germany) Roland Waschkau	Aston Martin Vantage AMR GT4	78	Did not finish
DNF	AT2	632	(Germany) Black Falcon Team Fanatec	(United Kingdom) Steve Alvarez Brown (United Kingdom) Jimmy Broadbent (Netherlands) Misha Charoudin (Germany) Manuel Metzger	Porsche 911 GT3 Cup (992.1)	70	Did not finish
DNF	SP 9 Pro	7	(Austria) Konrad Motorsport	(Germany) Christian Engelhart (Bulgaria) Pavel Lefterov (Germany) Maximilian Paul (Latvia) Patricija Stalidzane	Lamborghini Huracán GT3 Evo 2	69	Did not finish
DNF	VTH	503	(Singapore) Giti Tire Motorsport by WS Racing	(Germany) Niklas Ehrhardt (Germany) Thomas Ehrhardt (Germany) Fabian Pirrone (Germany) Julia Ponkratz	Toyota GR Supra (A90)	68	Did not finish
DNF	Cup3 Pro	952	(Germany) Smyrlis Racing	(Germany) Alex Koch (Germany) Christian Kraus (Germany) Henry Lindloff (Norway) Peder Saltvedt	Porsche 718 Cayman GT4 RS Clubsport	65	Did not finish
DNF	SP 9 Pro	17	(Germany) Dunlop Motorsport	(France) Julien Andlauer (France) Dorian Boccolacci (Germany) Nico Menzel (Belgium) Alessio Picariello	Porsche 911 GT3 R (992.2)	62	Did not finish
DNF	SP 9 Pro-Am	65	(Germany) HRT Ford Racing	(Netherlands) Colin Caresani (Germany) Hubert Haupt (Germany) Vincent Kolb (Germany) David Schumacher	Ford Mustang GT3 Evo	60	Did not finish
DNF	SP 9 Pro-Am	39	(Germany) Walkenhorst Motorsport	(Norway) Anders Buchardt (Germany) Nico Hantke (Netherlands) Mex Jansen (Germany) Henry Walkenhorst	Aston Martin Vantage AMR GT3 Evo	59	Did not finish
DNF	325i	112	(Germany) JS Competition	(Germany) Eugen Becker (Germany) Bernd Küpper (Germany) Jonas Spölgen (Switzerland) Flurin Zimmermann	BMW 325i Racing (E90)	59	Did not finish
DNF	SP 10	187	(Germany) FK Performance Motorsport	(South Africa) Leyton Fourie (Germany) Luca Link (Germany) Moritz Wiskirchen (Germany) Nick Wüstenhagen	BMW M4 GT4 (G82)	56	Did not finish
DNF	SP 9 Pro	44	(Germany) Falken Motorsports	(Austria) Klaus Bachler (Germany) Tim Heinemann (Germany) Sven Müller (Netherlands) Morris Schuring	Porsche 911 GT3 R (992.2)	53	Did not finish
DNF	SP 9 Pro	1	(Germany) Rowe Racing	(Brazil) Augusto Farfus (Switzerland) Raffaele Marciello (South Africa) Jordan Pepper (South Africa) Kelvin van der Linde	BMW M4 GT3 Evo	49	Did not finish
DNF	SP 10	175	(Germany) PROsport-Racing	(Sweden) Gustav Bard (Belgium) Jacques Derenne (Germany) Carsten Kautz (Argentina) Marcos Adolfo Vázquez	Mercedes-AMG GT4	46	Did not finish
DNF	SP-X	66	(Austria) Reiter Engineering	(Switzerland) Miklas Born (Germany) Arne Hoffmeister (Germany) Laurents Hörr (Germany) Marcel Marchewicz	KTM X-Bow GTX	42	Did not finish
DNF	SP 4T	76	(Germany) Max Kruse Racing	(Germany) Timo Hochwind (South Africa) Jonathan Mogotsi (Germany) Nicholas Otto (Germany) Fabian Vettel	Volkswagen Golf GTI Clubsport 24h	41	Did not finish
DNF	SP 3T	808	(Germany) asBest Racing	(South Korea) Son Geon (Poland) Rafał Gieras (Hong Kong) Samuel Hsieh (Japan) Junichi Umemoto	Cupra León TCR	38	Did not finish
DNF	SP 9 Pro-Am	33	(Germany) KKrämer Racing	(Germany) Christopher Brück (Germany) Michele Di Martino (Germany) Fidel Leib (Germany) Tobias Vazquez-Garcia	Audi R8 LMS Evo II	35	Did not finish
DNF	SP 9 Am	786	(Thailand) Renazzo Motorsport	(Germany) Christoph Breuer (Germany) Thomas Mutsch (Thailand) Kiki Sak Nana (Germany) Dieter Schmidtmann	Lamborghini Huracán GT3 Evo 2	26	Did not finish
DNF	M240i	677	(Germany) asBest Racing	(Switzerland) Thomas Alpiger (Switzerland) Marco Grilli (Switzerland) Michael Neuhauser (Germany) Sebastian Tauber	BMW M240i Racing (F22)	25	Did not finish
DNF	SP 9 Pro	911	(Germany) Manthey Racing	(France) Kévin Estre (Turkey) Ayhancan Güven (Austria) Thomas Preining (Australia) Matt Campbell	Porsche 911 GT3 R (992.2)	24	Did not finish
DNF	SP 9 Pro	64	(Germany) HRT Ford Racing	(India) Arjun Maini (Switzerland) Fabio Scherer (Germany) David Schumacher (Germany) Frank Stippler	Ford Mustang GT3 Evo	24	Did not finish
DNF	SP 9 Pro	16	(Germany) Scherer Sport PHX	(United Kingdom) Ben Green (Germany) Christopher Haase (United Kingdom) Alexander Sims	Audi R8 LMS Evo II	16	Did not finish
DNF	SP 3	277	(Germany) Ravenol Motorsport by MDM Racing	(Germany) Leo Geisler (United Kingdom) Mike Harris (Germany) Marc David Müller (Germany) Henrik Seibel	BMW 318ti	16	Did not finish
DNF	SP 9 Pro	47	(Hong Kong) KCMG	(Japan) Nirei Fukuzumi (Japan) Naoya Gamou (Finland) Jesse Krohn (United Kingdom) David Pittard	Mercedes-AMG GT3 Evo	15	Did not finish
DNF	SP 10	189	(Switzerland) Hofor Racing by Bonk Motorsport	(Germany) Michael Bonk (Switzerland) Martin Kroll (Switzerland) Ranko Mijatovic (Germany) Jörg Weidinger	BMW M4 GT4 Evo (G82)	15	Did not finish
DNF	SP 9 Pro	45	(Japan) Realize Kondo Racing with Rinaldi	(Germany) Dennis Marschall (France) Thomas Neubauer (South Africa) David Perel (Netherlands) Thierry Vermeulen	Ferrari 296 GT3 Evo	14	Did not finish
DNF	AT1	75	(Germany) Max Kruse Racing	(Netherlands) Tom Coronel (Germany) Dominik Fugel (Germany) Marcel Fugel (Germany) Benjamin Leuchter	Audi R8 LMS Evo II	11	Did not finish
DNF	V6	410	(Germany) rent2Drive-racing	(Germany) David Ackermann (Italy) Stefano Croci (France) Jérôme Larbi (Latvia) Matīss Mežaks	Porsche Cayman GTS	6	Did not finish
DNF	SP 9 Pro-Am	35	(Germany) Walkenhorst Motorsport	(Germany) Stefan Aust (Germany) Felipe Fernández Laser (Germany) Dennis Fetzer (Ecuador) Mateo Villagómez	Aston Martin Vantage AMR GT3 Evo	3	Did not finish
DSQ	SP 9 Pro	84	(Germany) Red Bull Team Abt	(Italy) Mirko Bortolotti (Germany) Luca Engstler (Switzerland) Patric Niederhauser	Lamborghini Huracán GT3 Evo 2	156	Disqualified
WD	M2	899	(Germany) W&S Motorsport	(Germany) Frank Anhorn (Germany) Yanis Anhorn (Luxembourg) Max Lamesch (Luxembourg) John Marechal	BMW M2 Racing (G87)		Crash in Qualifying 3
WD	AT2	146	(Germany) WS Racing	(Germany) Michelle Halder (Germany) Janina Schall (Germany) Carrie Schreiner (Liechtenstein) Fabienne Wohlwend	Porsche 911 (992) GT3 Cup		Crash in Qualifying 1
Official results

Notes:

- The #84 Red Bull Team Abt Lamborghini Huracán GT3 Evo 2 originally finished second overall, but was disqualified a month later for exceeding its power output.

== Bibliography ==
- Jörg-Richard Ufer & Tim Upietz. 24 Stunden Nürburgring Nordschleife 2026. Gruppe C Motorsport Verlag. ISBN 978-3-948501-48-8.

Intercontinental GT Challenge
Previous race: 2026 Bathurst 12 Hour	2026 season	Next race: 2026 24 Hours of Spa
