= 2023 Prototype Cup Germany =

Series of car races

The 2023 Prototype Cup Germany was the second season of the Prototype Cup Germany. Creventic and German automobile club ADAC are the organizers and promoters of the series. The races were contested with Le Mans Prototype, while no Group CN cars were entered despite being eligible. The season started on 28th April at the Hockenheimring and ended on 15 October at the Nürburgring.

== Calendar ==
2023 Prototype Cup Germany

Round		Circuit	Date	Supporting
1	R1	Hockenheimring, Hockenheim, Baden-Württemberg, Germany	28–30 April	ADAC Racing Weekend
1	R2	Hockenheimring, Hockenheim, Baden-Württemberg, Germany	28–30 April	ADAC Racing Weekend
2	R1	Motorsport Arena Oschersleben, Oschersleben, Börde, Germany	26–28 May	Deutsche Tourenwagen Masters; ADAC GT4 Germany
2	R2	Motorsport Arena Oschersleben, Oschersleben, Börde, Germany	26–28 May	Deutsche Tourenwagen Masters; ADAC GT4 Germany
3	R1	Circuit Zandvoort, Zandvoort, North Holland, Netherlands	23–25 June	Deutsche Tourenwagen Masters; ADAC GT4 Germany; Porsche Carrera Cup Germany; F1 Academy
3	R2	Circuit Zandvoort, Zandvoort, North Holland, Netherlands	23–25 June	Deutsche Tourenwagen Masters; ADAC GT4 Germany; Porsche Carrera Cup Germany; F1 Academy
4	R1	Norisring, Nuremberg, Bavaria, Germany	7–9 July	Deutsche Tourenwagen Masters; ADAC GT Masters
4	R2	Norisring, Nuremberg, Bavaria, Germany	7–9 July	Deutsche Tourenwagen Masters; ADAC GT Masters
5	R1	TT Circuit Assen, Assen, Netherlands	1–3 September	ADAC Racing Weekend
5	R2	TT Circuit Assen, Assen, Netherlands	1–3 September	ADAC Racing Weekend
6	R1	Nürburgring, Nürburg, Rhineland-Palatinate, Germany	13–15 October	ADAC Racing Weekend
6	R2	Nürburgring, Nürburg, Rhineland-Palatinate, Germany	13–15 October	ADAC Racing Weekend

== Teams and drivers ==
Team	Chassis	No.	Drivers	Class	Rounds
(Austria) Konrad Motorsport	Ginetta G61-LT-P3	2	(United States) Danny Soufi	J	All
(Austria) Konrad Motorsport	Ginetta G61-LT-P3	2	(United States) Nico Silva		1–2
(Austria) Konrad Motorsport	Ginetta G61-LT-P3	2	(Zimbabwe) Axcil Jefferies		3
(Austria) Konrad Motorsport	Ginetta G61-LT-P3	2	(Germany) Hamza Owega		5
(Austria) Konrad Motorsport	Ginetta G61-LT-P3	2	(Germany) Tim Zimmermann		6
(Austria) Konrad Motorsport	Ginetta G61-LT-P3	22	(Germany) Sebastian von Gartzen		All
(Austria) Konrad Motorsport	Ginetta G61-LT-P3	22	(Germany) Maximilian Hackländer		All
(Germany) Aust Motorsport	Ligier JS P320	3	(Germany) Dino Steiner	T	1–5
(Germany) Aust Motorsport	Ligier JS P320	3	(Austria) Constantin Schöll	J	1–4
(Germany) Aust Motorsport	Ligier JS P320	3	(United Kingdom) Nigel Moore		5–6
(Germany) JvO Racing by Downforce Motorsports (Germany) Van Ommen Racing by DataLab (Note: Entered round 1 as JvO Racing by Downforce Motorsports and rounds 2–5 as Van Ommen Racing by DataLab.)	Duqueine M30 - D08	5	(Czech Republic) Gabriela Jílková		1–3, 5
(Germany) JvO Racing by Downforce Motorsports (Germany) Van Ommen Racing by DataLab	Duqueine M30 - D08	5	(Switzerland) Lucas Mauron	J	1
(Germany) JvO Racing by Downforce Motorsports (Germany) Van Ommen Racing by DataLab	Duqueine M30 - D08	5	(Spain) Xavier Lloveras	J	2–5
(Germany) JvO Racing by Downforce Motorsports (Germany) Van Ommen Racing by DataLab	Duqueine M30 - D08	5	(Spain) Belén García	J	4
(Germany) JvO Racing by Downforce Motorsports (Germany) Van Ommen Racing by DataLab	Duqueine M30 - D08	6	(Switzerland) Julien Apothéloz	J	All
(Germany) JvO Racing by Downforce Motorsports (Germany) Van Ommen Racing by DataLab	Duqueine M30 - D08	6	(Colombia) Óscar Tunjo		All
(Germany) BWT Mücke Motorsport	Duqueine M30 - D08	8	(Germany) Nico Göhler	J	All
(Germany) BWT Mücke Motorsport	Duqueine M30 - D08	8	(Brazil) Gustavo Kiryla		All
(Italy) MMi Motorsport	Ligier JS P320	9	(United States) Enzo Scionti	J	3
(Italy) MMi Motorsport	Ligier JS P320	9	(Morocco) Suleiman Zanfari	J	3
(Luxembourg) Racing Experience	Duqueine M30 - D08	12	(Austria) Wolfgang Payr	T	All
(Luxembourg) Racing Experience	Duqueine M30 - D08	12	(Germany) Kevin Rohrscheidt	T	1–4
(Luxembourg) Racing Experience	Duqueine M30 - D08	12	(Luxembourg) David Hauser		5–6
(Luxembourg) Racing Experience	Duqueine M30 - D08	15	(Luxembourg) Gary Hauser		All
(Luxembourg) Racing Experience	Duqueine M30 - D08	15	(Germany) Markus Pommer		All
(Germany) MRS GT-Racing	Ligier JS P320	14	(Germany) Jan Marschalkowski	J	All
(Germany) MRS GT-Racing	Ligier JS P320	14	(Canada) Marco Kacic	J	1–2
(Germany) MRS GT-Racing	Ligier JS P320	14	(Netherlands) Jasper Stiksma	J	3, 5
(Germany) MRS GT-Racing	Ligier JS P320	14	(Portugal) Guilherme Oliveira	J	6
(Belgium) Mühlner Motorsport	Duqueine M30 - D08	21	(Denmark) Martin Andersen		1–2
(Belgium) Mühlner Motorsport	Duqueine M30 - D08	21	(Spain) Xavier Lloveras	J	6
(Germany) Reiter Engineering	Ligier JS P320	24	(Austria) Horst Felbermayr Jr.	T	3
(Germany) Reiter Engineering	Ligier JS P320	24	(United Kingdom) Freddie Hunt		3
(Netherlands) More Motorsport by Reiter	Ligier JS P320	99	(Netherlands) Mark van der Snel	T	All
(Netherlands) More Motorsport by Reiter	Ligier JS P320	99	(Netherlands) Max van der Snel	J	All
(Czech Republic) Bretton Racing	Ligier JS P320	26	(Czech Republic) Dan Skočdopole	J	6
(Germany) Frikadelli Racing Team	Ligier JS P320	30	(Germany) Klaus Abbelen	T	6
(Germany) Frikadelli Racing Team	Ligier JS P320	30	(Germany) Felipe Fernández Laser		6
(United Kingdom) BHK Motorsport	Ligier JS P320	35	(Switzerland) Elia Sperandio	J	1–4
(United Kingdom) BHK Motorsport	Ligier JS P320	35	(Switzerland) Lucas Mauron	J	2
(United Kingdom) BHK Motorsport	Ligier JS P320	35	(Romania) Alex Cascatău		3–4
(United Kingdom) BHK Motorsport	Duqueine M30 - D08	35	(Switzerland) Elia Sperandio	J	5–6
(United Kingdom) BHK Motorsport	Duqueine M30 - D08	35	(Netherlands) Beitske Visser		5–6
(Spain) AF2 Motorsport	Ligier JS P320	47	(United States) Robert Doyle	T	3
(Spain) AF2 Motorsport	Ligier JS P320	47	(Germany) Wolfgang Kaufmann	T	3
(Germany) Gebhardt Motorsport	Ginetta G61-LT-P3	70	(Germany) Jacob Erlbacher	J	1–4
(Germany) Gebhardt Motorsport	Ginetta G61-LT-P3	70	(United States) Courtney Crone	J	1–3
(Germany) Gebhardt Motorsport	Ginetta G61-LT-P3	70	(United Kingdom) Michael Lyons		4
(Germany) Gebhardt Motorsport	Duqueine M30 - D08	70	(Germany) Jacob Erlbacher	J	5–6
(Germany) Gebhardt Motorsport	Duqueine M30 - D08	70	(United States) Courtney Crone	J	5
(Finland) Koiranen Kemppi Motorsport	Duqueine M30 - D08	72	(Germany) Laurents Hörr		1–5
(Finland) Koiranen Kemppi Motorsport	Duqueine M30 - D08	72	(Germany) Matthias Lüthen	T	1–5
(Finland) Koiranen Kemppi Motorsport	Duqueine M30 - D08	73	(Finland) Leevi Vappula	J	5
(Luxembourg) DKR Engineering	Duqueine M30 - D08	77	(Germany) Valentino Catalano	J	All
(Luxembourg) DKR Engineering	Duqueine M30 - D08	77	(Poland) Robin Rogalski	J	All
(Luxembourg) DKR Engineering	Duqueine M30 - D08	78	(Netherlands) Leonard Hoogenboom	J	3
(Luxembourg) DKR Engineering	Duqueine M30 - D08	78	(Mozambique) Pedro Perino	J	3

Icon	Legend
J	Junior
T	Trophy

== Race results ==
Round		Circuit	Pole position	Winners
1	R1	(Germany) Hockenheimring	(Germany) No. 6 JvO Racing by Downforce Motorsports	(Germany) No. 6 JvO Racing by Downforce Motorsports
1	R1	(Germany) Hockenheimring	(Switzerland) Julien Apothéloz (Colombia) Óscar Tunjo	(Switzerland) Julien Apothéloz (Colombia) Óscar Tunjo
1	R2	(Germany) Hockenheimring	(Luxembourg) No. 77 DKR Engineering	(Luxembourg) No. 15 Racing Experience
1	R2	(Germany) Hockenheimring	(Germany) Valentino Catalano (Poland) Robin Rogalski	(Luxembourg) Gary Hauser (Germany) Markus Pommer
2	R1	(Germany) Oschersleben	(Finland) No. 72 Koiranen Kemppi Motorsport	(Germany) No. 6 Van Ommen Racing by DataLab
2	R1	(Germany) Oschersleben	(Germany) Laurents Hörr (Germany) Matthias Lüthen	(Switzerland) Julien Apothéloz (Colombia) Óscar Tunjo
2	R2	(Germany) Oschersleben	(Luxembourg) No. 77 DKR Engineering	(Luxembourg) No. 77 DKR Engineering
2	R2	(Germany) Oschersleben	(Germany) Valentino Catalano (Poland) Robin Rogalski	(Germany) Valentino Catalano (Poland) Robin Rogalski
3	R1	(Netherlands) Zandvoort	(Germany) No. 6 Van Ommen Racing by DataLab	(Germany) No. 14 MRS GT-Racing
3	R1	(Netherlands) Zandvoort	(Switzerland) Julien Apothéloz (Colombia) Óscar Tunjo	(Germany) Jan Marschalkowski (Netherlands) Jasper Stiksma
3	R2	(Netherlands) Zandvoort	(Germany) No. 5 Van Ommen Racing by DataLab	(Germany) No. 5 Van Ommen Racing by DataLab
3	R2	(Netherlands) Zandvoort	(Czech Republic) Gabriela Jílková (Spain) Xavier Lloveras	(Czech Republic) Gabriela Jílková (Spain) Xavier Lloveras
4	R1	(Germany) Norisring	(Finland) No. 72 Koiranen Kemppi Motorsport	(Luxembourg) No. 15 Racing Experience
4	R1	(Germany) Norisring	(Germany) Laurents Hörr (Germany) Matthias Lüthen	(Luxembourg) Gary Hauser (Germany) Markus Pommer
4	R2	(Germany) Norisring	(Luxembourg) No. 77 DKR Engineering	(Finland) No. 72 Koiranen Kemppi Motorsport
4	R2	(Germany) Norisring	(Germany) Valentino Catalano (Poland) Robin Rogalski	(Germany) Laurents Hörr (Germany) Matthias Lüthen
5	R1	(Netherlands) Assen	(Luxembourg) No. 15 Racing Experience	(Luxembourg) No. 15 Racing Experience
5	R1	(Netherlands) Assen	(Luxembourg) Gary Hauser (Germany) Markus Pommer	(Luxembourg) Gary Hauser (Germany) Markus Pommer
5	R2	(Netherlands) Assen	(Luxembourg) No. 77 DKR Engineering	(Netherlands) No. 99 More Motorsport by Reiter
5	R2	(Netherlands) Assen	(Germany) Valentino Catalano (Poland) Robin Rogalski	(Netherlands) Mark van der Snel (Netherlands) Max van der Snel
6	R1	(Germany) Nürburgring	(Luxembourg) No. 15 Racing Experience	(Luxembourg) No. 15 Racing Experience
6	R1	(Germany) Nürburgring	(Luxembourg) Gary Hauser (Germany) Markus Pommer	(Luxembourg) Gary Hauser (Germany) Markus Pommer
6	R2	(Germany) Nürburgring	(Germany) No. 8 BWT Mücke Motorsport	(Germany) No. 6 Van Ommen Racing by DataLab
6	R2	(Germany) Nürburgring	(Germany) Nico Göhler (Brazil) Gustavo Kiryla	(Switzerland) Julien Apothéloz (Colombia) Óscar Tunjo

=== Drivers' Championship ===
1st	2nd	3rd	4th	5th	6th	7th	8th	9th	10th	11th	12th	13th	14th	15th
25	20	16	13	11	10	9	8	7	6	5	4	3	2	1

Pos.	Driver	HOC (Germany)		OSC (Germany)		ZAN (Netherlands)		NOR (Germany)		ASS (Netherlands)		NÜR (Germany)		Points
1	(Luxembourg) Gary Hauser (Germany) Markus Pommer	2	1	2	3	5	4	1	3	1	2	1	10	223
2	(Switzerland) Julien Apothéloz (Colombia) Óscar Tunjo	1	3	1	2	Ret	Ret	3	4	2	Ret	4	1	173
3	(Germany) Nico Göhler (Brazil) Gustavo Kiryla	4	5	15	5	2	11	4	2	6	Ret	5	3	133
4	(Germany) Valentino Catalano (Poland) Robin Rogalski	6	2	3	1	6	2	Ret	Ret	5	8†	7	Ret	130
5	(Germany) Jan Marschalkowski	11	8	11	8	1	Ret	7	6	4	7†	3	7	119
6	(Germany) Laurents Hörr (Germany) Matthias Lüthen	3	DNS	4	9	4	6	5	1	3	Ret			111
7	(Spain) Xavier Lloveras			6	Ret	3	1	2	10	8	DNS	6	5	106
8	(Netherlands) Mark van der Snel (Netherlands) Max van der Snel	8	9	5	10	15†	8	8	5	Ret	1	12	8	103
9	(Czech Republic) Gabriela Jílková	5	4	6	Ret	3	1			8	DNS			83
10	(Germany) Sebastian von Gartzen (Germany) Maximilian Hackländer	Ret	6	7	7	10	5	9	Ret	Ret	9†	8	11	74
11	(Germany) Jacob Erlbacher	Ret	14	13	11	8	10	11	7	12	4	DSQ	4	73
12	(Germany) Dino Steiner	9	10	10	Ret	9	13	10	8	7	3			71
13	(United Kingdom) Nigel Moore									7	3	2	2	65
14	(Switzerland) Elia Sperandio	7	7	9	Ret	7	3	DNS	DNS	11	Ret	Ret	14	60
15	(United States) Danny Soufi	Ret	13	8	6	13†	DNS	6	Ret	10	Ret	10	9	59
=	(Austria) Wolfgang Payr	12	13	14	12	12	15	12	9	13	6	13	13	59
16	(Netherlands) Jasper Stiksma					1	Ret			4	7†			48
17	(United States) Courtney Crone	Ret	14	13	11	8	10			12	4			46
=	(Austria) Constantin Schöll	9	10	10	Ret	9	13	10	8					46
18	(Germany) Kevin Rohrscheidt	12	13	14	12	12	15	12	9					34
19	(Switzerland) Lucas Mauron	5	4	9	Ret									31
20	(Spain) Belén García							2	10					26
=	(Portugal) Guilherme Oliveira											3	7	26
=	(Canada) Marco Kacic	11	8	11	8									26
21	(Romania) Alex Cascatău					7	3	DNS	DNS					25
=	(Luxembourg) David Hauser									13	6	13	13	25
22	(Denmark) Martin Andersen	10	Ret	12	4									23
23	(Germany) Tim Zimmermann											10	9	15
24	(United Kingdom) Michael Lyons							11	7					14
25	(Netherlands) Beitske Visser									11	Ret	Ret	14	10
26	(Germany) Hamza Owega									10	Ret			7
27	(United States) Nico Silva	Ret	13	WD	WD									5
28	(Zimbabwe) Axcil Jefferies					13†	DNS							3
Guest drivers ineligible to score points
	(Finland) Leevi Vappula									9	5			
	(Netherlands) Leonard Hoogenboom (Mozambique) Pedro Perino					11	7							
	(Czech Republic) Dan Skočdopole											9	12	
	(Germany) Klaus Abbelen (Germany) Felipe Fernández Laser											11	6	
	(United States) Enzo Scionti (Morocco) Suleiman Zanfari					Ret	9							
	(Germany) Wolfgang Kaufmann					14	12							
	(Austria) Horst Felbermayr Jr. (United Kingdom) Freddie Hunt					Ret	14							
	(United States) Robert Doyle					14	WD							
Pos.	Driver	HOC (Germany)		OSC (Germany)		ZAN (Netherlands)		NOR (Germany)		ASS (Netherlands)		NÜR (Germany)		Points

=== Classes ===
Pos.	Driver	HOC (Germany)		OSC (Germany)		ZAN (Netherlands)		NOR (Germany)		ASS (Netherlands)		NÜR (Germany)		Points
Junior
1	(Netherlands) Max van der Snel	6	7	3	6	10†	5	6	3	Ret	1	4	4	202.5
2	(Switzerland) Julien Apothéloz	1	2	1	2	Ret	Ret	2	2	1	Ret	2	1	200
3	(Germany) Nico Göhler	2	4	10	3	2	8	3	1	4	Ret	3	2	175
4	(Germany) Jan Marschalkowski	8	6	8	5	1	Ret	5	4	2	4	1	6	158
5	(Germany) Valentino Catalano (Poland) Robin Rogalski	4	1	2	1	4	2	Ret	Ret	3	5	6	Ret	156
6	(Spain) Xavier Lloveras			4	Ret	3	1	1	7	5	Ret	5	5	125
7	(Germany) Jacob Erlbacher	Ret	10	9	7	6	7	8	5	9	2	DSQ	3	106
8	(Austria) Constantin Schöll	7	8	7	Ret	7	9	7	6					94.5
9	(United States) Danny Soufi	Ret	9	5	4	9†	DNS	4	Ret	7	Ret	7	7	81
10	(Switzerland) Elia Sperandio	5	5	6	Ret	5	3	DNS	DNS	8	Ret	Ret	8	76
11	(United States) Courtney Crone	Ret	10	9	7	6	7			9	2			71
12	(Netherlands) Jasper Stiksma					1	Ret			2	4			61
13	(Switzerland) Lucas Mauron	3	3	6	Ret									42
14	(Canada) Marco Kacic	8	6	8	5									37
15	(Spain) Belén García							1	7					34
16	(Portugal) Guilherme Oliveira											1	6	36
Guest drivers ineligible to score points
	(Finland) Leevi Vappula									6	3			
	(Netherlands) Leonard Hoogenboom (Mozambique) Pedro Perino					8	4							
	(United States) Enzo Scionti (Morocco) Suleiman Zanfari					Ret	6							
	(Czech Republic) Dan Skočdopole											8	8	
Trophy
1	(Netherlands) Mark van der Snel	2	1	2	2	5†	2	2	2	Ret	1			277.5
2	(Austria) Wolfgang Payr	4	3	4	3	3	6	4	4	3	3			274
3	(Germany) Dino Steiner	3	2	3	Ret	2	3	3	3	2	2			240
4	(Germany) Kevin Rohrscheidt	4	3	4	3	3	6	4	4					226
5	(Germany) Matthias Lüthen	1	DNS	1	1	1	1	1	1	1	Ret			200
Guest drivers ineligible to score points
	(Germany) Wolfgang Kaufmann					4	4							
	(United States) Robert Doyle					4	WD							
	(Austria) Horst Felbermayr Jr.					Ret	5							
Pos.	Driver	HOC (Germany)		OSC (Germany)		ZAN (Netherlands)		NOR (Germany)		ASS (Netherlands)		NÜR (Germany)		Points

=== Teams ===
Pos.	Team	Manufacturer	HOC (Germany)		OSC (Germany)		ZAN (Netherlands)		NOR (Germany)		ASS (Netherlands)		NÜR (Germany)		Points
1	(Luxembourg) Racing Experience	Duqueine	2	1	2	3	5	4	1	3	1	2	1	10	223
2	(Germany) JvO Racing by Downforce Motorsports (Germany) Van Ommen Racing by DataLab	Duqueine	1	3	1	2	3	1	2	4	2	Ret	4	1	218
3	(Germany) BWT Mücke Motorsport	Duqueine	4	5	15	5	2	11	4	2	6	Ret	5	3	141
4	(Luxembourg) DKR Engineering	Duqueine	6	2	3	1	6	2	Ret	Ret	5	8†	7	Ret	132
5	(Germany) MRS GT-Racing	Ligier	11	8	11	8	1	Ret	7	6	4	7	3	7	126
6	(Germany) Aust Motorsport	Ligier	9	10	10	Ret	9	13	10	8	7	3	2	2	117
7	(Finland) Koiranen Kemppi Motorsport	Duqueine	3	DNS	4	9	4	6	5	1	3	Ret			114
8	(Netherlands) More Motorsport by Reiter	Ligier	8	9	5	10	15†	8	8	5	Ret	1	12	8	110
9	(Austria) Konrad Motorsport	Ginetta	Ret	6	7	6	10	5	6	Ret	10	9†	8	9	92
10	(Germany) Gebhardt Motorsport	Duqueine; Ginetta	Ret	14	13	11	8	10	11	7	12	4	DSQ	4	81
11	(United Kingdom) BHK Motorsport	Duqueine; Ligier	7	7	9	Ret	7	3	DNS	DNS	11	Ret	Ret	14	67
12	(Belgium) Mühlner Motorsport	Duqueine	10	Ret	12	4							6	5	41
Guest teams ineligible to score points
	(Germany) Frikadelli Racing Team	Ligier											11	6	
	(Czech Republic) Bretton Racing	Ligier											9	12	
	(Italy) MMi Motorsport	Ligier					Ret	9							
	(Spain) AF2 Motorsport	Ligier					14	12							
	(Germany) Reiter Engineering	Ligier					Ret	14							
Pos.	Team	Manufacturer	HOC (Germany)		OSC (Germany)		ZAN (Netherlands)		NOR (Germany)		ASS (Netherlands)		NÜR (Germany)		Points
