= Max van der Snel =

Dutch racing driver (born 2003)

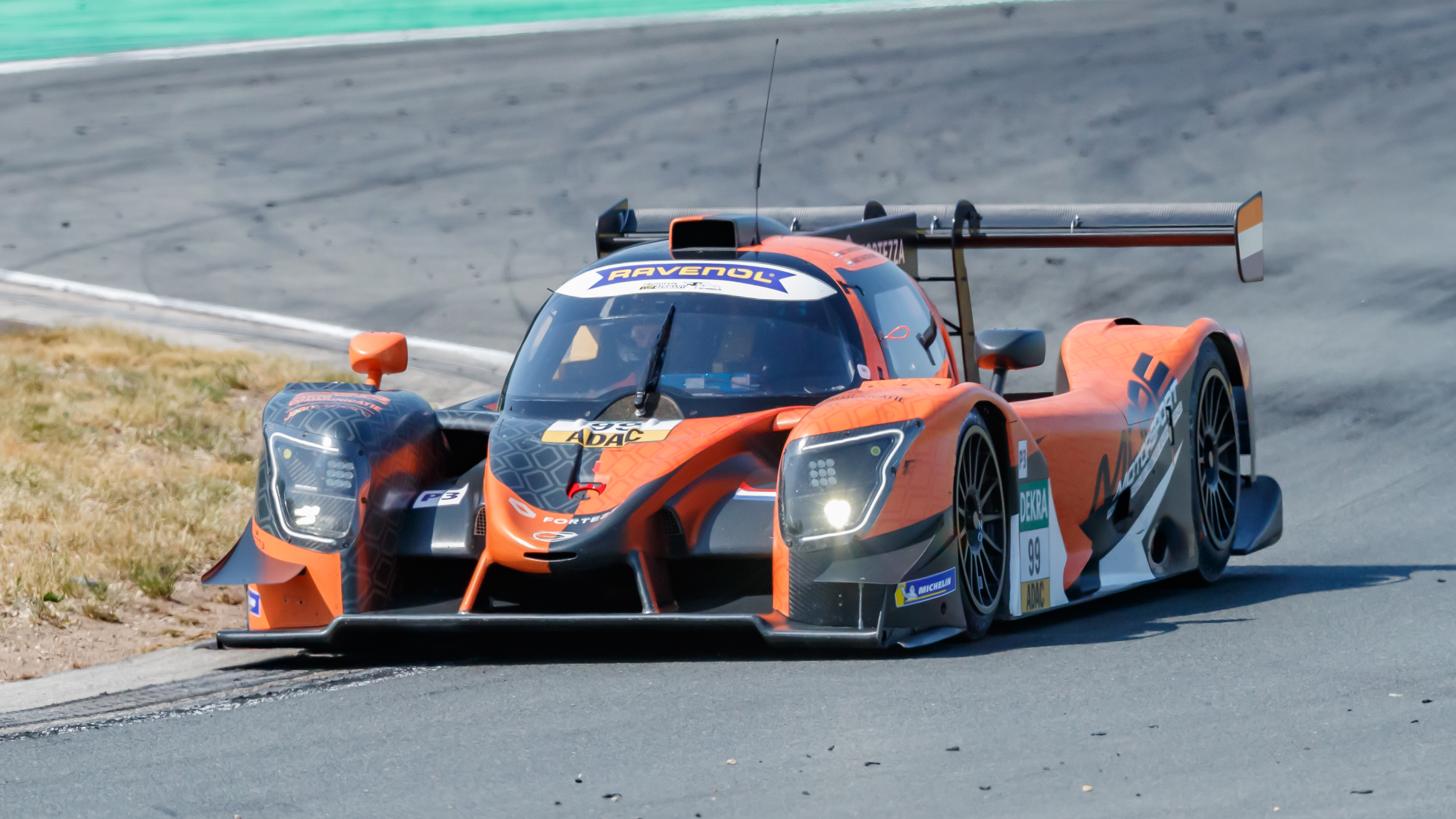
- Van der Snel in 2023
- Nationality: (Netherlands) Dutch
- Born: 2 August 2003 (age 23) Hazerswoude-Dorp, Netherlands

European Le Mans Series career
- Debut season: 2026
- Current team: EuroInternational
- Categorisation: FIA Silver
- Car number: 11
- Starts: 6
- Wins: 0
- Podiums: 1
- Poles: 0
- Fastest laps: 0
- Best finish: 5th (LMP3) in 2026

Previous series
- 2025 2023: Radical Cup UK; Prototype Cup Germany

Championship titles
- 2023: Prototype Cup Germany – Junior

Max van der Snel (born 2 August 2003) is a Dutch racing driver who last competed in the European Le Mans Series for EuroInternational and the Le Mans Cup for More Motorsport. He is the co-owner and founder of More Motorsport.

== Personal life ==
Van der Snel is the son of Dutch businessman and racing driver Mark van der Snel, whom he co-founded More Motorsport with in 2023, and drove with in his early prototype career.

== Career ==
Van der Snel began competitive karting at the age of 8, primarily competing in national championships until he was 12, when he stepped away from motorsport. During his short karting career, Van der Snel most notably won the 2012 Dobla Kart Challenge.

After trying other sports, Van der Snel returned to motorsport in 2021. He competed in the Westfield Cup, a Dutch series for Lotus Seven-inspired cars built by Westfield, for two years, and was most notably runner-up in the overall standings in 2022.

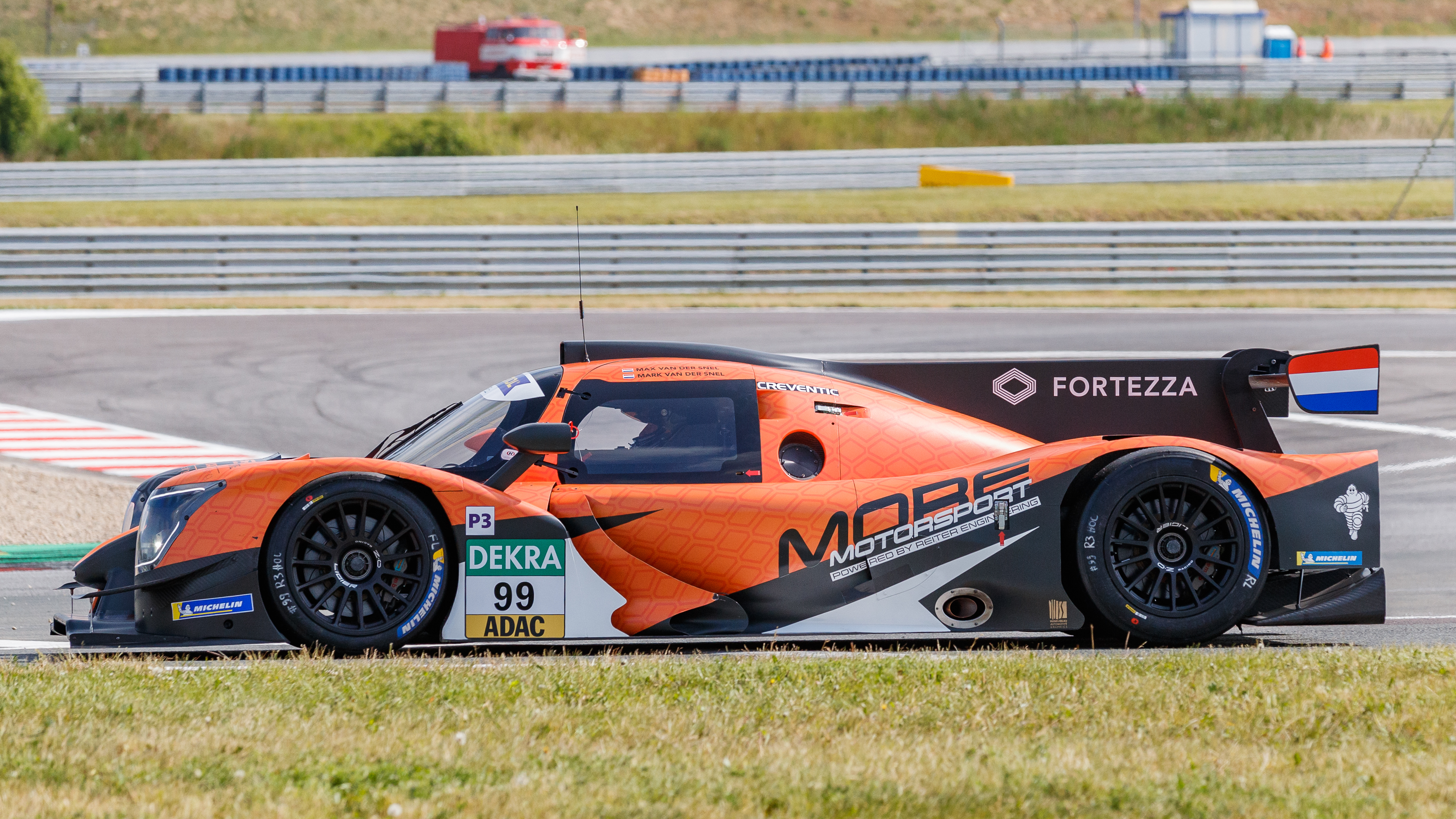
Van der Snel's More Motorsport LMP3 at Oschersleben in 2023.

In 2023, Van der Snel and his father Mark founded More Motorsport, and joined forces with Reiter Engineering to enter a Ligier JS P320 in the Prototype Cup Germany. On their LMP3 debut, the pair took a lone win at Assen to finish eighth overall, as Max also clinched the Junior class title. In 2024, the Van der Snels took More Motorsport to the Le Mans Cup, their only points finish being a podium at Spa as they ended the year 16th. In October, Max participated in the ELMS rookie test, where he sampled LMP2 machinery for Team Virage. Despite this, he remained with his father for another Le Mans Cup season in 2025, and took three top 5 finishes, including a best result of fourth at Barcelona, to take seventh in the newly-formed LMP3 Pro-Am class. That year, Van der Snel also took two wins in a part-time campaign in Radical Cup UK, and scored a Pro 1500 class win in the Radical World Finals.

In 2026, Van der Snel took on a dual LMP3 campaign, pairing up with Tim Gerhards at More Motorsport in the Le Mans Cup, and joining Matthew Richard Bell and Douwe Dedecker at EuroInternational in the European Le Mans Series. Between the two campaigns, Van der Snel found more success in ELMS, where he scored a lone podium at Spa and finished fourth in all but one race to take sixth in points. During 2026, Van der Snel made his LMP2 debut for Intersport Racing in the IMSA SportsCar Championship, racing at Road America and Petit Le Mans. That year, Van der Snel also drove Cup3 Pro machinery at the 24 Hours of Nürburgring for Adrenalin Motorsport. Towards the end of the year, Van der Snel partook in the European Le Mans Series rookie tests for Duqueine Team in LMP2, as well as Racing Spirit of Léman in LMP3.

== Karting record ==
=== Karting career summary ===
Season	Series	Team	Position
2011–12	Chrono Rotax Max Winter Cup — Micro Max		15th
2012	Chrono Dutch RMC — Micro Max		8th
2013	Chrono Karting Winter Serie — Micro Max		11th

== Racing record ==
=== Racing career summary ===
Season	Series	Team	Races	Wins	Poles	F/Laps	Podiums	Points	Position
2021	Westfield Cup								
2022	Westfield Cup								**2nd**
2023	Prototype Cup Germany	More Motorsport by Reiter	12	1	0	0	1	103	8th
2024	Le Mans Cup – LMP3	More Motorsport	7	0	0	0	1	15	16th
2025	Le Mans Cup – LMP3 Pro-Am	More Motorsport	7	0	0	0	0	38	7th
2025	Radical Cup UK	Valour Racing	6	2	1	2	6	304	7th
2025	Radical World Finals – Pro 1500		4	1	1	2	2		
2026	Le Mans Cup – LMP3	More Motorsport	6	0	0	0	0	26	11th
2026	European Le Mans Series – LMP3	EuroInternational	6	0	0	0	1	63	5th
2026	Nürburgring Langstrecken-Serie – BMW M240i	Adrenalin Motorsport Team Mainhattan Wheels	1	0	0	0	0	6*	NC*
2026	Porsche Endurance Trophy Nürburgring Cup – Cup3 Pro	Adrenalin Motorsport Team Mainhattan Wheels	1	0	0	0	0	0*	NC*
2026	24 Hours of Nürburgring – Cup3 Pro	Adrenalin Motorsport Team Mainhattan Wheels	1	0	0	0	0	—N/a	7th
2026	IMSA SportsCar Championship – LMP2	Intersport Racing	2	0	0	0	0	472	29th

=== Complete Prototype Cup Germany results ===
(key) (Races in bold indicate pole position) (Races in italics indicate fastest lap)

Year	Team	Car	Engine	1	2	3	4	5	6	7	8	9	10	11	12	DC	Points
2023	More Motorsport by Reiter	Ligier JS P320	Nissan VK56DE 5.6 L V8	HOC; 1; 8	HOC; 2; 9	OSC; 1; 5	OSC; 2; 10	ZAN; 1; 15†	ZAN; 2; 8	NOR; 1; 8	NOR; 2; 5	ASS; 1 Ret	ASS; 2; 1	NÜR; 1; 12	NÜR; 2; 8	8th	103

=== Complete Le Mans Cup results ===
(key) (Races in bold indicate pole position; results in italics indicate fastest lap)

Year	Entrant	Class	Chassis	1	2	3	4	5	6	7	Rank	Points
2024	More Motorsport	LMP3	Ligier JS P320	CAT; 21	LEC; 18	LMS; 1; 31	LMS; 2; 26	SPA; 3	MUG; 19	ALG; Ret	16th	15
2025	More Motorsport	LMP3 Pro-Am	Ligier JS P325	CAT; 4	LEC; 5	LMS; 1; 13	LMS; 2; 6	SPA; 11	SIL; 5	ALG; Ret	7th	38
2026	More Motorsport	LMP3	Ligier JS P325	CAT; 7	LEC; 6	LMS; Ret	SPA; 7	SIL; Ret	ALG; 7		11th	26

^{*} Season still in progress.

=== Complete European Le Mans Series results ===
(key) (Races in bold indicate pole position; results in italics indicate fastest lap)

Year	Entrant	Class	Chassis	Engine	1	2	3	4	5	6	Rank	Points
2026	EuroInternational	LMP3	Ligier JS P325	Toyota V35A 3.5 L V6	CAT; 4	LEC; DSQ	IMO; 4	SPA; 3	SIL; 4	ALG; 4	5th	63

=== Complete IMSA SportsCar Championship results ===
Year	Entrant	Class	Chassis	Engine	1	2	3	4	5	6	7	Rank	Points
2026	Intersport Racing	LMP2	Oreca 07	Gibson GK428 4.2 L V8	DAY	SEB	WGL	MOS	ELK; 12	IMS	PET; 7	29th	472

^{*} Season still in progress.
