= 2010 SEAT León Supercopa Spain season =

2010 SEAT León Supercopa Spain

Seasons
- ← 2009 2011 →

The 2010 SEAT León Supercopa Spain season is the ninth SEAT León Supercopa Spain season. The season consists of six triple-header meetings, beginning at Circuit Ricardo Tormo on April 17 and concluding at Circuit de Catalunya on October 31.

== Teams and drivers ==
Team	No.	Drivers	Rounds
(Spain) PCR Sport	1	(Spain) Marc Carol	All
(Spain) PCR Sport	4	(Spain) Antonio Aristi	2–5
(Spain) PCR Sport	5	(Spain) Marcos de Diego	All
(Spain) PCR Sport	6	(Spain) Álvaro Fontes	All
(Spain) PCR Sport	21	(Spain) Harriet Arruabarrena	All
(Spain) Sunred	2	(Spain) Oscar Nogués	All
(Spain) Sunred	4	(Spain) Diego Puyo	1
(Spain) Sunred	7	(Spain) Diego Puyo	4
(Spain) Sunred	8	(Spain) Antoni Forné	1–5
(Spain) Sunred	8	(Italy) Luigi Mazzali	6
(Spain) Sunred	15	(Spain) Javier Ibrán	1–4
(Spain) Dale Gas	3	(Spain) Antonio de la Reina	1–5
(Spain) Prorace	9	(Spain) Oscar Más	1–2, 4–6
(Spain) Prorace	14	(Spain) Luis Pons	All
(Portugal) Veloso Motorsport	10	(Portugal) Vitor Souto	All
(Switzerland) Ursinho Bar & Café	11	(Switzerland) Urs Sonderegger	1
(United Kingdom) Welch Motorsport	12	(United Kingdom) Daniel Welch	All
(United Kingdom) Welch Motorsport	18	(United Kingdom) David Nye	All
(United Kingdom) Welch Motorsport	24	(Australia) Matt Telling	1
(United Kingdom) Welch Motorsport	37	(United Kingdom) Simon Hepplewhite	3
(Spain) Baporo Motorsport	13	(Andorra) Amalia Vinyes	All
(Spain) Baporo Motorsport	16	(Spain) Pol Rosell	All
(Spain) Baporo Motorsport	23	(Spain) Josep María Dabad	1–3
(Spain) Baporo Motorsport	28	(Spain) Míguel Toril	All
(Spain) RC Service	17	(Spain) Luis Recuenco	2–3
(Spain) RC Service	19	(Spain) Juan Carlos Cortizo	2–4, 6
(Portugal) Araujo Competição	20	(Portugal) Gonçalo Araujo	1–3
(Portugal) Fabela Sport	22	(Portugal) Fábio Mota	All
(Portugal) Fabela Sport	32	(Portugal) Gonçalo Manahu	2–3, 5–6
(Hungary) Zengő Motorsport	25	(Hungary) György Kontra	All
(Hungary) Zengő Motorsport	26	(Hungary) Attila Solti	1–4
(Hungary) Zengő Motorsport	27	(Hungary) Norbert Michelisz	1
(Hungary) Zengő Motorsport	30	(Hungary) Norbert Kiss	2–5
(Hungary) Zengő Motorsport	35	(Portugal) Duarte Félix da Costa	3
(Portugal) Oasis Motorsport	29	(Republic of Ireland) Eoin Murray	1
(Spain) Monlau Competición	31	(Portugal) Francisco Carvalho	2–6
(Spain) Monlau Competición	38	(Spain) Josep María Dabad	5
(Spain) Monlau Competición	74	(Spain) Josep Oriola	All
(Portugal) Garagem 19	33	(Portugal) David Saraiva	1–4, 6
(Portugal) Garagem 19	36	(Portugal) João Pina Cardoso	3
(Italy) Astra Racing	40	(Italy) Alberto Vescovi	6
(France) Sacha Bottemanne	41	(France) Sacha Bottemanne	6
(France) Julien Briché	42	(France) Julien Briché	6
(France) Pascal Destembert	43	(France) Pascal Destembert	6
(United Kingdom) Advent Motorsport	44	(Sweden) Freddy Nordström	All
(United Kingdom) Advent Motorsport	50	(Bosnia and Herzegovina) Boris Miljević	1–3
(Italy) Bruno Curletto	45	(Italy) Bruno Curletto	6
(France) Nicolas Metairie	46	(France) Nicolas Metairie	6
(France) Gilles Duqueine	47	(France) Gilles Duqueine	6
(France) Jean-Marie Clairet	48	(France) Jean-Marie Clairet	6
(France) Gael Castelli	49	(France) Gael Castelli	6
(United Kingdom) Max Goff	81	(United Kingdom) Max Goff	6

== Calendar ==
Round		Circuit	Date	Pole position	Fastest lap	Winning driver	Winning team
1	R1	(Spain) Circuit Ricardo Tormo, Valencia	17 April	(Spain) Oscar Nogués	(Spain) Oscar Nogués	(Spain) Oscar Nogués	(Spain) Sunred
1	R2	(Spain) Circuit Ricardo Tormo, Valencia	17 April	(Spain) Oscar Nogués	(Spain) Oscar Nogués	(Spain) Oscar Nogués	(Spain) Sunred
1	R3	(Spain) Circuit Ricardo Tormo, Valencia	18 April	(Spain) Pol Rosell	(Spain) Oscar Nogués	(Spain) Oscar Nogués	(Spain) Sunred
2	R4	(Spain) Circuito del Jarama, Madrid	5 June	(Spain) Marc Carol	(Spain) Marc Carol	(Spain) Marc Carol	(Spain) PCR Sport
2	R5	(Spain) Circuito del Jarama, Madrid	5 June	(Spain) Marc Carol	(Spain) Marc Carol	(Spain) Marc Carol	(Spain) PCR Sport
2	R6	(Spain) Circuito del Jarama, Madrid	6 June	(Portugal) David Saraiva	(Hungary) Norbert Kiss	(Hungary) Norbert Kiss	(Hungary) Zengő Motorsport
3	R7	(Portugal) Autódromo Internacional do Algarve, Portimão	3 July	(Hungary) Norbert Kiss	(Spain) Oscar Nogués	(Spain) Oscar Nogués	(Spain) Sunred
3	R8	(Portugal) Autódromo Internacional do Algarve, Portimão	3 July	(Spain) Oscar Nogués	(Hungary) Norbert Kiss	(Spain) Oscar Nogués	(Spain) Sunred
3	R9	(Portugal) Autódromo Internacional do Algarve, Portimão	4 July	(Spain) Marc Carol	(Hungary) Norbert Kiss	(Spain) Marc Carol	(Spain) PCR Sport
4	R10	(Spain) Circuito de Navarra, Los Arcos	25 September	(Spain) Oscar Nogués	(Spain) Marcos de Diego	(Spain) Oscar Nogués	(Spain) Sunred
4	R11	(Spain) Circuito de Navarra, Los Arcos	25 September	(Spain) Oscar Nogués	(Spain) Oscar Nogués	(Spain) Oscar Nogués	(Spain) Sunred
4	R12	(Spain) Circuito de Navarra, Los Arcos	26 September	(Spain) Antonio Aristi	(Spain) Marc Carol	(Spain) Marc Carol	(Spain) PCR Sport
5	R13	(Spain) Circuito de Jerez, Jerez de la Frontera	16 October	(Spain) Marc Carol	(Spain) Marc Carol	(Spain) Marc Carol	(Spain) PCR Sport
5	R14	(Spain) Circuito de Jerez, Jerez de la Frontera	16 October	(Spain) Marc Carol	(Spain) Marc Carol	(Spain) Marc Carol	(Spain) PCR Sport
5	R15	(Spain) Circuito de Jerez, Jerez de la Frontera	17 October	(Spain) Antonio Aristi	(Portugal) Vitor Souto	(Spain) Antonio Aristi	(Spain) PCR Sport
6	R16	(Spain) Circuit de Catalunya, Montmeló	30 October	(Spain) Oscar Nogués	(Spain) Marc Carol	(Spain) Oscar Nogués	(Spain) Sunred
6	R17	(Spain) Circuit de Catalunya, Montmeló	30 October	(Spain) Oscar Nogués	(Spain) Marcos de Diego	(Spain) Oscar Nogués	(Spain) Sunred
6	R18	(Spain) Circuit de Catalunya, Montmeló	31 October	(Portugal) David Saraiva	(United Kingdom) Max Goff	(Spain) Marc Carol	(Spain) PCR Sport

== Championship standings ==
- Point system: 10, 8, 7, 6, 5, 4, 3, 2, 1, 1, 1, 1 for races 1 and 2, while race 3 awards 20, 17, 14, 12, 10, 8, 6, 5, 4, 3, 2, 1. 1 point for Fastest lap awarded in all races.

Pos	Driver	VAL (Spain)			JAR (Spain)			ALG (Portugal)			NAV (Spain)			JER (Spain)			BAR (Spain)			Points
1	(Spain) Marc Carol	2	2	2	1	1	3	5	6	1	2	2	1	1	1	5	2	5	1	201
2	(Spain) Oscar Nogués	1	1	1	3	2	2	1	1	3	1	1	3	5	4	3	1	1	12	191
3	(Spain) Marcos de Diego	4	5	4	8	8	15	9	8	6	5	3	12	8	5	2	3	2	10	95
4	(Spain) Josep Oriola	5	Ret	11	5	5	8	10	12	7	4	Ret	7	4	17	16	5	3	2	77
5	(Spain) Pol Rosell	9	6	14	12	Ret	Ret	4	4	4	Ret	DNS	Ret	3	3	4	7	4	4	77
6	(Hungary) Norbert Kiss				9	4	1	7	2	2	7	4	Ret	Ret	DNS	Ret				67
7	(Spain) Álvaro Fontes	3	4	5	7	11	7	2	3	10	12	10	10	11	18	11	Ret	DNS	DNS	59
8	(Spain) Antonio de la Reina	6	3	3	2	9	Ret	Ret	DNS	Ret	3	Ret	6	7	7	DSQ				55
9	(Portugal) David Saraiva	Ret	DNS	15	6	6	4	6	7	8	13	Ret	Ret				8	6	5	48
10	(Spain) Antonio Aristi				21	25	DSQ	14	16	13	9	6	2	10	6	1				47
11	(Spain) Míguel Toril	14	12	17	18	26	18	16	17	14	11	8	4	2	2	7	10	7	Ret	42
12	(Spain) Antoni Forné	11	7	10	4	3	Ret	12	11	5	10	7	Ret	6	Ret	14				40
13	(United Kingdom) Daniel Welch	17	14	8	11	7	Ret	8	9	9	6	5	5	13	Ret	DNS	Ret	DNS	22	35
14	(Portugal) Vitor Souto	25	21	24	28	15	6	3	5	28	8	18	15	Ret	DNS	18	Ret	DNS	DNS	23
15	(France) Jean-Marie Clairet																4	14	3	20
16	(Portugal) Gonçalo Araujo	8	8	6	20	22	10	11	14	12										17
17	(Andorra) Amalia Vinyes	19	20	Ret	15	14	5	DNS	DNS	16	15	9	Ret	18	13	8	Ret	DNS	DNS	16
18	(Portugal) Francisco Carvalho				10	10	Ret	30	DNS	Ret	DNS	DNS	DNS	Ret	DNS	10	6	8	9	15
19	(Spain) Josep María Dabad	13	18	18	14	20	13	15	13	11				20	9	6				11
20	(Sweden) Freddy Nordström	21	27	Ret	Ret	DNS	Ret	17	18	17	14	13	8	9	14	9	15	12	15	11
21	(Spain) Oscar Más	10	10	Ret	19	Ret	11	18	15	18	16	11	11	12	8	13	Ret	DNS	19	10
22	(Spain) Luis Pons	20	16	9	13	13	9	23	Ret	19	18	17	19	14	10	Ret	17	13	Ret	9
23	(France) Julien Briché																13	18	6	8
24	(United Kingdom) Max Goff																9	20	7	8
25	(Hungary) Norbert Michelisz	12	13	7																7
26	(France) Nicolas Metairie																18	10	8	6
27	(Spain) Diego Puyo	7	9	12							DNS	DNS	DNS							5
28	(United Kingdom) David Nye	26	23	16	26	19	14	Ret	Ret	22	19	15	9	19	Ret	DNS	21	24	13	4
29	(Spain) Harriet Arruabarrena	18	19	13	16	16	16	19	19	15	21	16	14	17	11	Ret	11	9	14	3
30	(Portugal) Fábio Mota	23	24	Ret	25	17	Ret	28	Ret	Ret	Ret	Ret	18	16	15	12	14	11	Ret	2
31	(Spain) Javier Ibrán	15	11	Ret							17	12	16							2
32	(France) Gael Castelli																19	Ret	11	2
33	(Portugal) Duarte Félix da Costa							13	10	Ret										1
34	(Spain) Juan Carlos Cortizo	16	17	19	17	12	21				20	14	13				20	19	Ret	1
35	(Hungary) György Kontra	Ret	DNS	19	24	21	17	21	Ret	25	23	19	17	15	12	15	22	15	17	1
36	(France) Sacha Bottemanne																12	25	16	1
37	(Spain) Luis Recuenco				23	18	12	20	21	20										1
38	(Republic of Ireland) Eoin Murray	Ret	15	25																0
39	(Portugal) Gonçalo Manahu				27	23	19	26	23	21				21	16	17	24	23	20	0
40	(France) Pascal Destembert																23	16	DNS	0
41	(Italy) Luigi Mazzali																16	Ret	Ret	0
42	(Italy) Alberto Vescovi																25	17	18	0
43	(Hungary) Attila Solti	27	22	22	22	Ret	Ret	25	20	Ret	22	20	20							0
44	(Bosnia and Herzegovina) Boris Miljević	24	26	23	29	24	20	29	Ret	27										0
45	(Australia) Matt Telling	22	25	21																0
46	(Italy) Bruno Curletto																26	22	21	0
47	(France) Gilles Duqueine																27	21	DSQ	0
48	(Portugal) João Pina Cardoso							24	22	26										0
49	(United Kingdom) Simon Hepplewhite							27	24	23										0
	(Switzerland) Urs Sonderegger	DNS	DNS	DNS																0
Pos	Driver	VAL (Spain)			JAR (Spain)			ALG (Portugal)			NAV (Spain)			JER (Spain)			BAR (Spain)			Points

Colour	Result
Gold	Winner
Silver	Second place
Bronze	Third place
Green	Points classification
Blue	Non-points classification
Blue	Non-classified finish (NC)
Purple	Retired, not classified (Ret)
Red	Did not qualify (DNQ)
Red	Did not pre-qualify (DNPQ)
Black	Disqualified (DSQ)
White	Did not start (DNS)
White	Withdrew (WD)
White	Race cancelled (C)
Blank	Did not practice (DNP)
Blank	Did not arrive (DNA)
Blank	Excluded (EX)
