= Ginetta G61-LT-P3 =

Le Mans Prototype LMP3 car

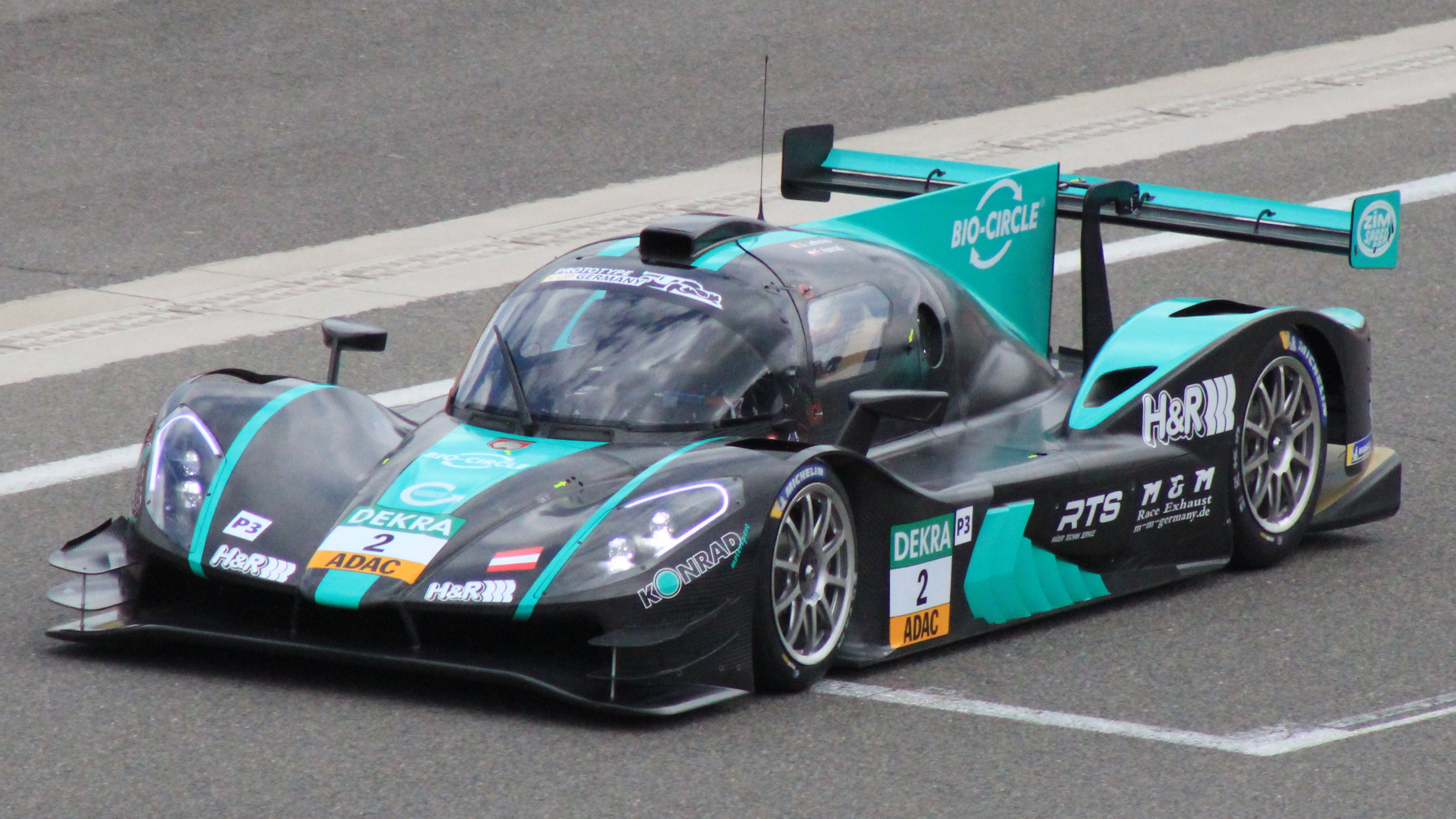
- The No. 2 G61-LT-P3 of Konrad Motorsport during the Spa-Francorchamps round of the 2022 Prototype Cup Germany.
- Category: LMP3
- Designers: Peter Smith (technical director, G61-LT-P3); Clive Seddon (technical director, G61-LT-P3 Evo); Alun Denbury (exterior designer)
- Predecessor: Ginetta-Juno P3-15

Technical specifications
- Chassis: Carbon Monocoque
- Suspension (front): Ohlins double wishbones, push-rod actuated springs and dampers, anti-roll bar
- Suspension (rear): As Front
- Length: 4,605 millimetres (181.3 in)
- Engine: G61-LT-P3: Nissan VK56DE 5,552 cc (5.6 L; 338.8 cu in) 90° V8 naturally aspirated G61-LT-P3 Evo: Toyota V35A-FTS 3,445 cc (3.4 L; 210.2 cu in) 60° V6 twin-turbocharged
- Transmission: 6-speed sequential gearbox XTrac 1152
- Power: 455 brake horsepower (461 PS; 339 kW); 420 newton-metres (310 lbf⋅ft)
- Weight: 950 kilograms (2,090 lb)
- Fuel: Various
- Lubricants: Various
- Brakes: Alcon ventilated discs, 6-pot caliper
- Tyres: Michelin

Competition history
- Notable entrants: (Slovakia) ARC Bratislava (Luxembourg) DKR Engineering (France) CMR (Germany) Gebhardt Motorsport (Austria) Konrad Motorsport (Austria) MG Sound Speed Division
- Debut: 2021 4 Hours of Dubai
Races	Wins	Titles
52	0	2
- Drivers' Championships: 2 (2023 Ultimate Cup Series - Proto LMP3 Ultimate, 2024 Ultimate Cup Series - Proto LMP3 Ultimate)

The Ginetta G61-LT-P3 is a Le Mans Prototype LMP3 built to ACO Le Mans Prototype LMP3 regulations. It was designed, and built by Ginetta Cars. The car is the successor to the original Ginetta-Juno P3-15, which was the first LMP3 Prototype. The car can be built from its predecessor, and is set to be eligible in a series of Championships worldwide, such as the European Le Mans Series, and the IMSA Prototype Challenge. The car was launched on the weekend of the 2019 24 Hours of Le Mans, being publicly unveiled alongside its competitors.

== Developmental history ==
On 23 May 2018, the Automobile Club de I'Ouest announced a brief outline for the 2020 Generation 2 Le Mans Prototype 3 (LMP3) regulations, alongside new chassis models from four approved manufacturers – Onroak Automotive (Ligier), Duqueine Automotive (Norma), ADESS AG and Ginetta being announced as granted homologation for the new ruleset. On 7 February 2019, the ACO announced the new 2nd Generation Le Mans Prototype 3 (LMP3) regulations, with full implementation due by 2021, and with the cars being expected to be raced from 2020 to 2024.

Styling cues from the new Ginetta Akula supercar was incorporated into the bodywork of the car, while the bodywork was developed by the team who had worked on the Ginetta G60-LT-P1 LMP1 car.

It was subsequently revealed on 16 December 2019, that the car already completed over 2,000 km of testing at several tracks within the United Kingdom, with the car being tested by Ginetta factory drivers, as well as other drivers with race experience in the Gen 1 LMP3 cars, who have also accumulated significant mileage in the other Gen II LMP3 cars.

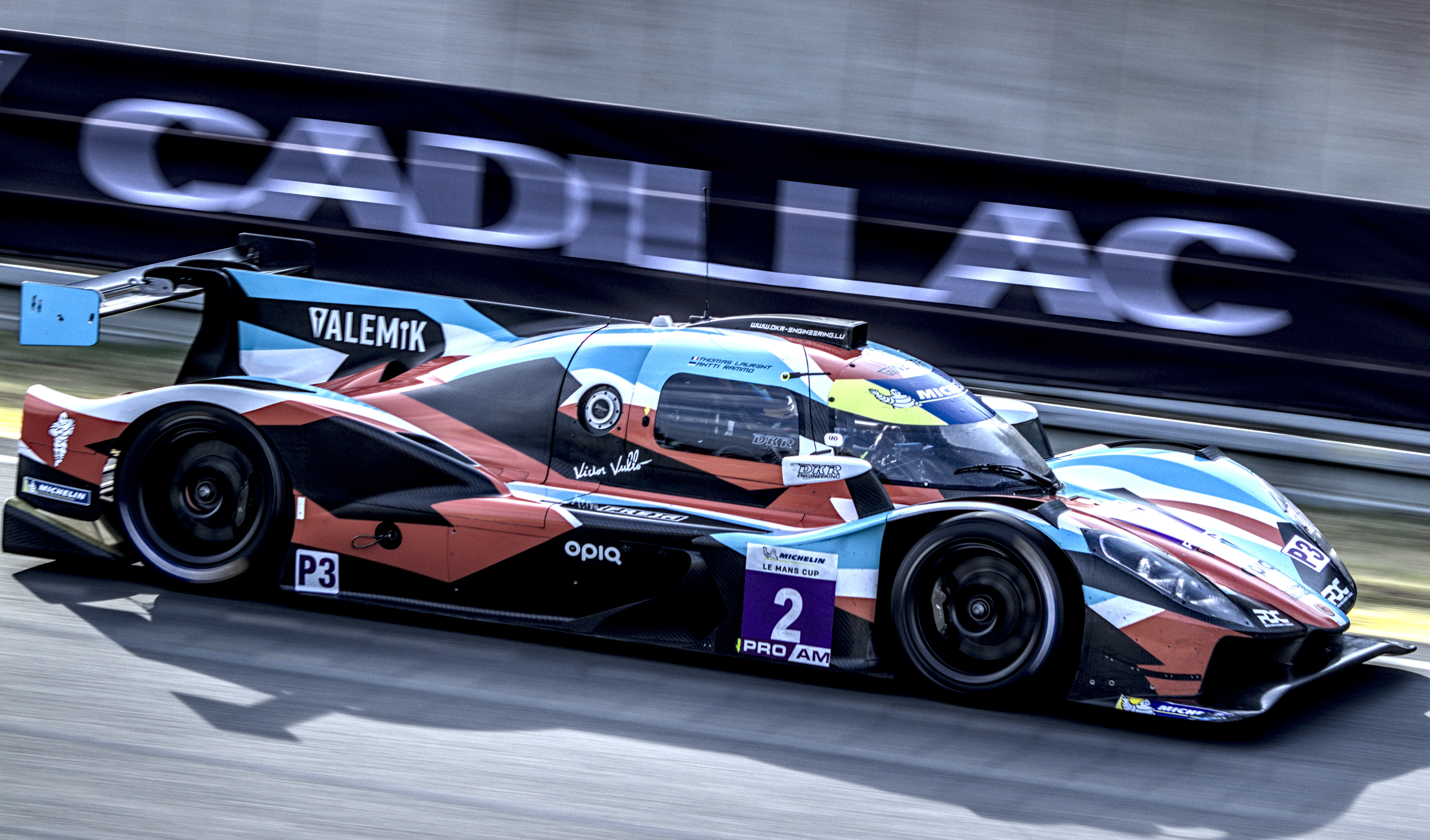
DKR's Ginetta G61-LT-P3 Evo in 2025.

=== Ginetta G61-LT-P3 Evo ===
In 2025, an updated version of the car, named the Ginetta G61-LT-P3 Evo, was released for use in the third generation of LMP3 competition. Laurents Hörr, as well as Ginetta head of motorsport and former LMP1 driver Mike Simpson, took on testing roles in the early development phase. The brand later struck a deal with DKR Engineering and entered the European Le Mans Series, which Simpson described as a "milestone moment".

The car achieved its first victory at the 2025 Road to Le Mans marquee race, as Thomas Laurent and Antti Rammo finished ninth overall and won the LMP3 Pro-Am class. Wyatt Brichacek, Mikkel Gaarde Pedersen and Rammo then gave Ginetta its first ELMS podium since 2015 at the season-ending 4 Hours of Portimão.
