= European Le Mans Series =

Sports car racing endurance series

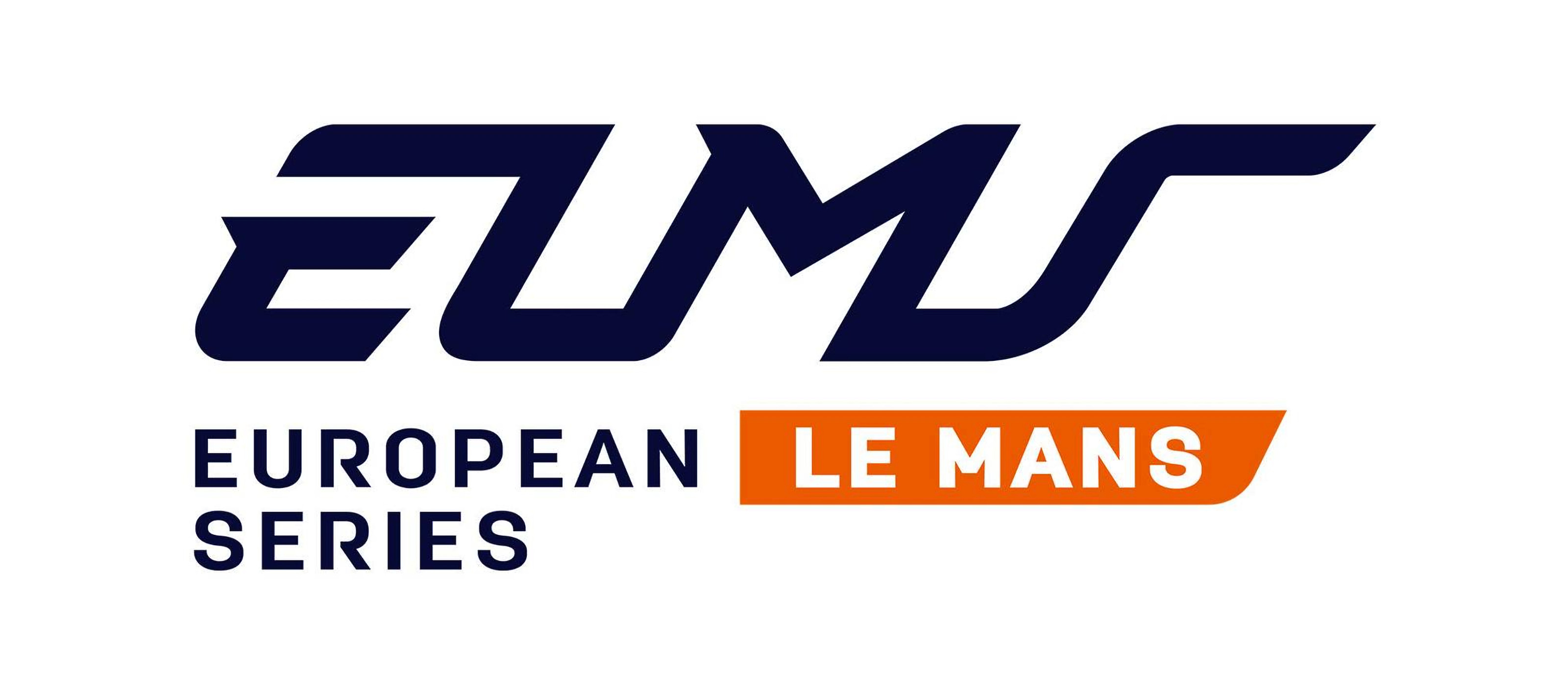
- Category: Endurance racing
- Region: Europe
- Inaugural season: 2004
- Prototype classes: LMP2, LMP2 Pro-Am, LMP3
- GT classes: LMGT3
- Teams: 24
- Constructors: LMGT3: McLaren • Ferrari • Aston Martin • Porsche • Mercedes-Benz • Chevrolet & Pratt Miller
- Chassis manufacturers: LMP2: Oreca LMP3: Ginetta • Ligier • Duqueine
- Engine manufacturers: LMP2:Gibson LMP3:Toyota
- Tyre suppliers: Goodyear, Michelin
- Drivers' champion: LMP2: (United Kingdom) Ben Hanley (Australia) Griffin Peebles (Switzerland) Grégoire Saucy; LMP2 Pro-Am: (Denmark) Malthe Jakobsen (Denmark) Michael Jensen (Italy) Enzo Trulli; LMP3: (France) Paul Lanchère (Brazil) Alexander Jacoby; LMGT3: (Republic of Ireland) Charlie Eastwood (United States) Blake McDonald (United States) Alec Udell
- Teams' champion: LMP2: (United Kingdom) United Autosports; LMP2 Pro-Am: (Portugal) Algarve Pro Racing; LMP3: (Switzerland) CLX Motorsport; LMGT3: (United Kingdom) TF Sport
- Official website: europeanlemansseries.com

The European Le Mans Series (abbreviated as ELMS) is a European sports car racing endurance series inspired by the 24 Hours of Le Mans race organized by the Automobile Club de l'Ouest (ACO). The European Le Mans Series is similar to the former American Le Mans Series (ALMS) based in the United States and Canada that was running with ACO and IMSA between 1999 and 2013. ELMS team champions and runners-up receive an automatic entry to the following year's 24 Hours of Le Mans. Originally titled the Le Mans Endurance Series before becoming simply the Le Mans Series in 2006, the series was renamed once more in 2012, reusing a name previously utilized by IMSA in 2001.

== History ==
When he was allowed to bring the rules and racing formulae of the 24 Hours of Le Mans to North America with the creation of the Petit Le Mans in 1998, Don Panoz attempted to build a series inspired by the Petit Le Mans. The aged IMSA GT Championship was taken over and became the new American Le Mans Series, and met with much success in 1999.

Europe had lacked a major sports prototype series since the demise of the World Sportscar Championship in 1992. Following the success of the ALMS, Panoz attempting to bring sports prototype racing back to Europe. This led to the 2000 American Le Mans Series season, which included two races in Europe as the Nürburgring and Silverstone Circuit, as well as a round in Australia. These races would serve as a precursor to what would become the separate European Le Mans Series in 2001.

The European Le Mans Series was launched for 2001 with five races, including a premier 1000 km race at Estoril, which would be the European equivalent of the 1000 mile Petit Le Mans and earn automatic entries to the 24 Hours of Le Mans for each class winner.

To aid in the development of the ELMS, the 2001 season shared some races between both ALMS and ELMS. The 12 Hours of Sebring and Petit Le Mans, normally ALMS races, were considered optional races for ELMS teams. At the same time, the ELMS races at Donington Park and Jarama were considered optional for ALMS teams. This allowed for the possibility of boosting the draw from international teams to either series.

The series was unable to earn much attention from European sportscar teams, especially since the final FIA Sportscar Championship and FIA GT Championship series used similar cars, but different rules which would require teams to modify their cars or buy new cars to comply with ELMS rules. For the ELMS events that included ALMS teams, very few teams actually bothered to make the trip across the Atlantic to participate in races that appeared to have very few serious competitors. Thus the entry lists for each race fell from 25 at the beginning of the season to a mere 14 at season's end, with some classes only having one or two competitors.

With a lack of involvement from teams, and less interest from the media due to the lack of teams, the European Le Mans Series folded following the 2001 season.

The ACO was not completely satisfied with the fact that IMSA did not fully comply with the ACO's regulations in order to help attract privateer teams, as well as the failure of the FIA Sportscar Championship to succeed in Europe. Seeing the success of the American Le Mans Series, the ACO decided that a series run by themselves would be a better alternative for Europe. The ACO would instead attempt to attract factory backed teams with longer endurance races than ALMS and FIA SCC ran. The series would also be European based instead of international, thus it could be closer to the factories of many sportscar teams to help attract them to the series.

In 2003, the ACO announced their intentions to create their own European-based series, named the Le Mans Endurance Series, which would be similar to the original European Le Mans Series, but feature only 1000 km races instead of the shorter, 2 hour 45 minute races used by the ELMS, and fewer races in a season than the ALMS and FIA SCC to help keep costs down. Winners of the LMES championship would go on to earn automatic entries in the 24 Hours of Le Mans, similar to the American Le Mans Series.

The series was initially previewed in an open race run under the LMES banner in 2003 at the 1000km of Le Mans, a one-off event before the season started in 2004.

For the 2004 Le Mans Endurance Series, the series participated in four events, including resurrecting classic races like the 1000km Monza, 1000km Nürburgring, 1000 km Silverstone and the Spa 1000 km. Many competitors participated, making the racing very exciting.

2005 saw the series expand to a five race format with the addition of the Istanbul Racing Circuit.

In 2007, the Le Mans Series held its first and single overseas race in the continent of South America with Mil Milhas Brasil as the sixth round.

In 2010, the Formula Le Mans Cup was integrated into the Le Mans Series, running alongside Le Mans Prototype cars and GT cars.

As the FIA World Endurance Championship was reestablished in 2012, the ELMS had a reduced car count including officially dropping the LMP1 Prototype class from the category and its calendar was reduced to three rounds in Paul Ricard, Donington Park and Road Atlanta (Petit Le Mans).

For 2013, a twenty-nine car field was announced, with eleven in the LMP2 class, ten in the LM GTE class, and five in the new GTC class, which used GT3 technical rules. The calendar featured five races with a duration of 3 hours.

In 2014, the LMPC class was dropped and all races were expanded to 4 hours.

The 2015 season saw the introduction of the new LMP3 prototype class with cars built from Ligier, Ginetta, ADESS & Norma. Each of these cars chassis are powered by 5.0L Nissan V8 naturally aspirated engines (VK50VE).

In 2016, the GTC class was dropped from the series and moved to a new support series, the GT3 Le Mans Cup. This tournament was held on the same weekends as the European Le Mans Series 4-hour events, as well as on the same week as the 24 Hours of Le Mans, with shorter races than the ELMS.

In 2017, it was established by ACO that the lower teams from LMP3 would drop to the year's Michelin Le Mans Cup, while the best LMP3 teams from this competition would be promoted to ELMS. During this year's season new ACO LMP2 Prototype Class regulations were introduced with licensed manufacturers such as Dallara, Onroak Automotive (Ligier), Oreca and the joint-venture Riley Tech/Multimatic with Gibson Technology being the exclusive engine supplier.

In 2020, with the season heavily impacted by the COVID-19 pandemic, the 4 Hours of Silverstone race would be dropped from the calendar due to a date not being able to be found. The 4 Hours of Barcelona would also be replaced by a second 4 Hours of Le Castellet race at Circuit Paul Ricard. New ACO Generation II LMP3 ruleset regulation built cars were also eligible for the LMP3 Class in the category featuring manufactured chassis's such as the Ginetta G61-LT-P3, Ligier JS P320, Duqueine D-08, and the ADESS-03 Evo all of which use a VK56DE 5.6L Nissan V8 naturally aspirated engine.

In the 2021 season of the ELMS a LMP2 Pro-Am Cup Trophy was introduced aimed at teams who have bronze rated contracted drivers.

In the 2023 season of the ELMS, it marks as the last season of the LMGTE class as it will be replaced with a GT3-Specification class to be known as LMGT3 starting in the year 2024 season with Goodyear being the exclusive tyre supplier.

In the year 2025 season of the European Le Mans Series, it'll mark the debut of the new ACO Generation III LMP3 built car set eligible for the category featuring manufactured chassis's such as the Ginetta G61-LT-P3 Evo, Ligier JS P325, Duqueine D09, and the ADESS AD25 all of which use a V35A 3.5L Toyota V6 twin turbo engine and Michelin tyres.

== Logo history ==
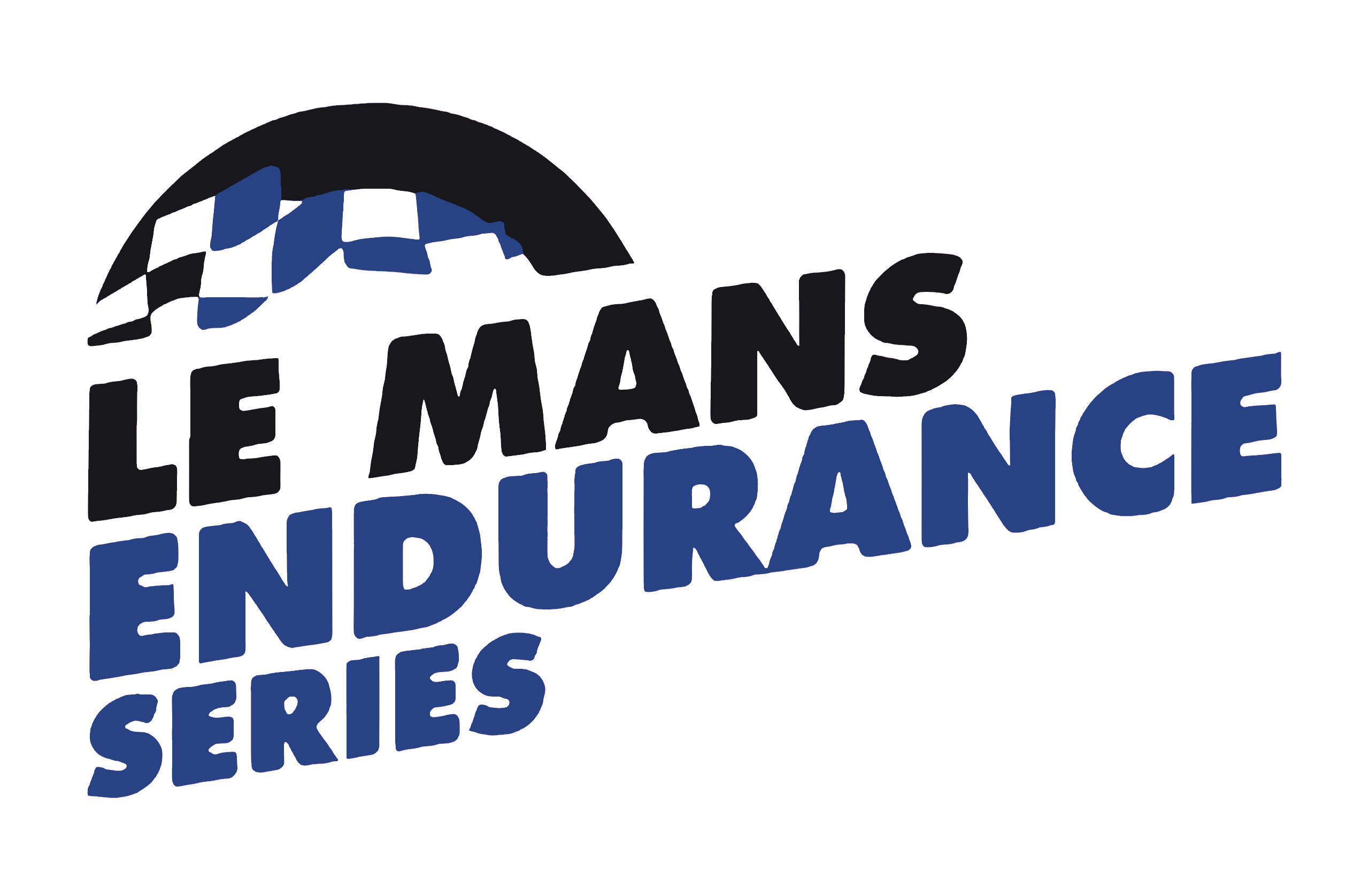
Le Mans Endurance Series logo used in the 2004 & 2005 year seasons

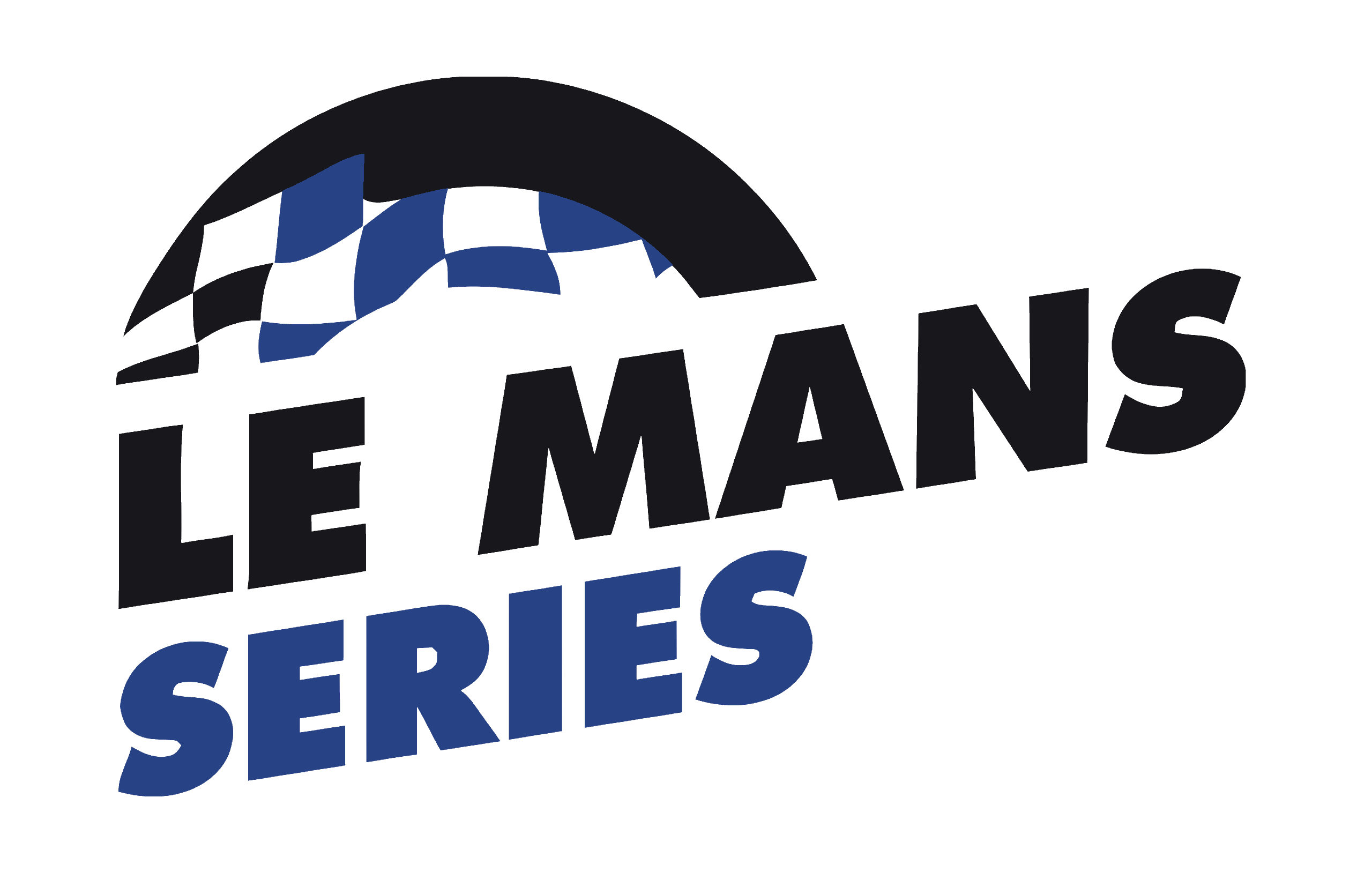
Le Mans Series logo used from 2006 until the end of the 2011 Le Mans Series season

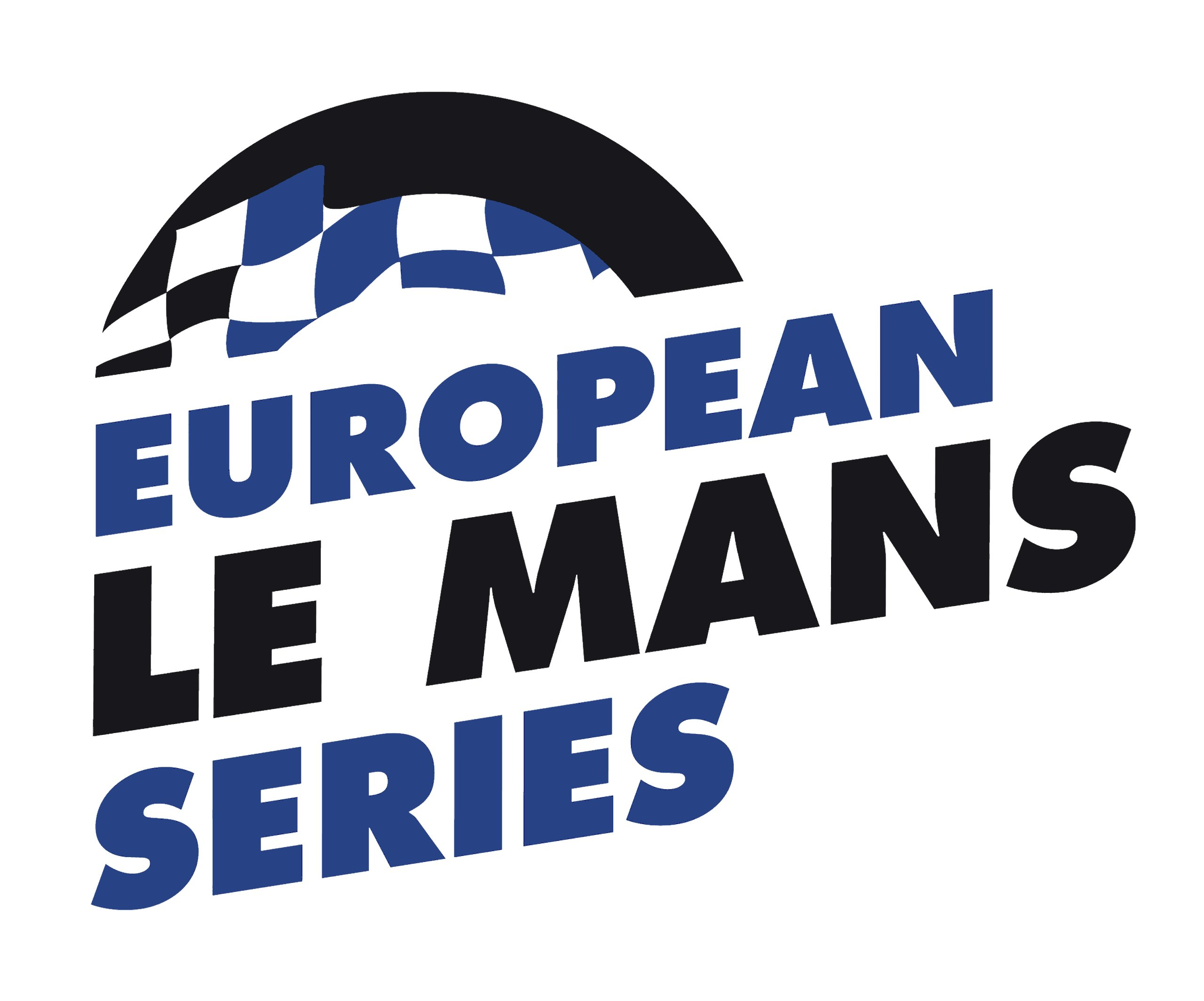
European Le Mans Series logo used from 2012 until the end of the 2017 year season

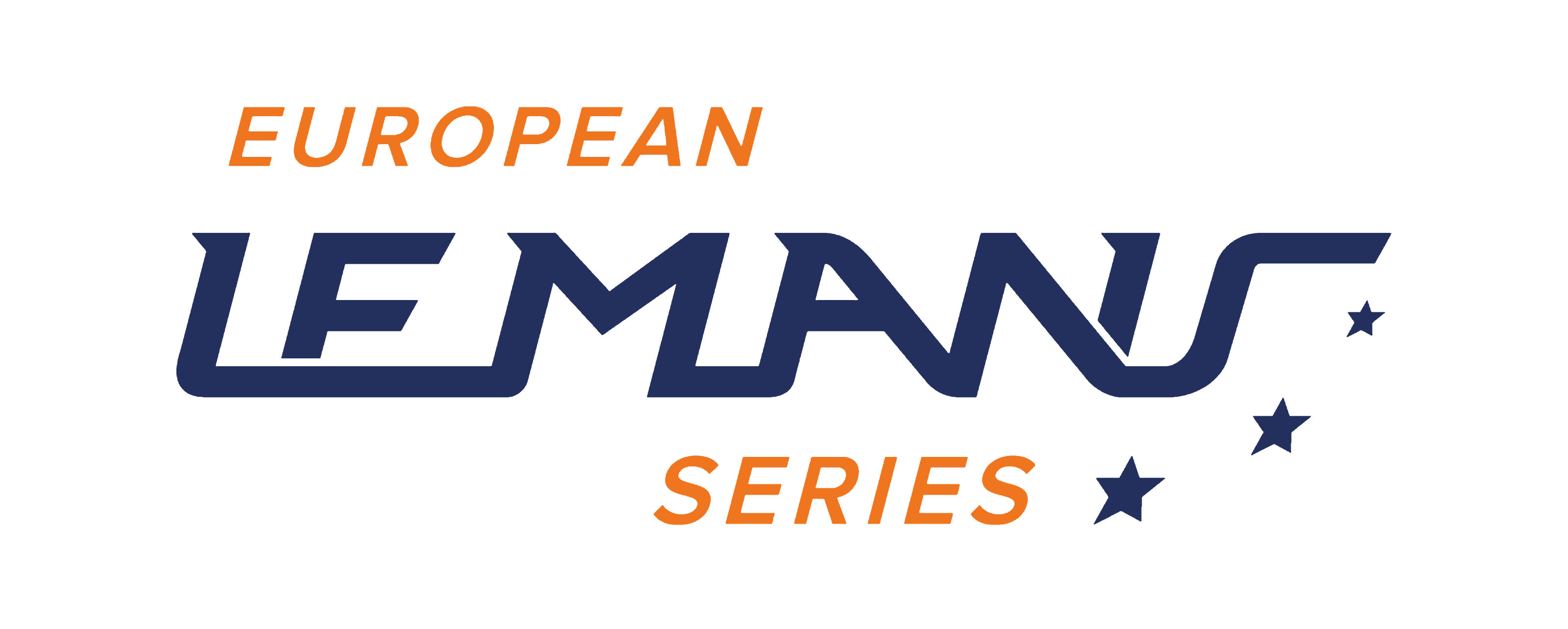
European Le Mans Series logo used from 2018 until the end of the 2023 season

== See also ==
- FIA Sportscar Championship
- World Sportscar Championship
- FIA World Endurance Championship
- Asian Le Mans Series
- IMSA SportsCar Championship
