= Freddy Nordström =

Anglo-Swedish racing driver and Forex trader

- Nationality: Anglo-Swedish
- Born: Rolf Fredrik Nordström; 22 February 1989 (age 37) Chertsey, Surrey, United Kingdom
- Debut season: 2003
- Current team: CAAL Racing
- Car number: 44
- Crew chief: Luca Canneori
- Starts: 162
- Championships: 1
- Wins: 8
- Podiums: 56
- Poles: 5
- Fastest laps: 7

Awards
- 2012, 2013, 2014: 3

Rolf Fredrik Nordström (born 22 February 1989 in Chertsey, Surrey) is an Anglo-Swedish racing driver and Forex trader living in London. He currently drives for CAAL Racing in the NASCAR Whelen Euro Series.

== Biography ==
=== Early life ===
Nordström was educated at Danes Hill School in Oxshott, King's College School in Wimbledon and the European Business School London and Paris. He has a BA Hons degree in International Business and French. A keen racer from an early age, he started car racing in the British Racing and Sports Car Club (BRSCC) T-Cars Championship in 2003, being the youngest Motor Sports Association (MSA) licence holder up until then. Nordström has worked as a Forex trader for 8 years and is now the CEO of Neverfire Ltd. Freddy resides in London.

== Racing career ==
=== T Cars ===
Nordström raced go-karts from eight years of age to the age of 14 when he entered the T Car championship, a race series for drivers between fourteen and seventeen years of age. He finished fourth in both his first and second year.

=== Mini Challenge ===
Nordström's young years belied a mature racing knowledge, fostered since his 2003 debut in the T Car Championships. His 2005 entry into the John Cooper Challenge (relaunched for 2006 as the Mini Challenge) saw him immediately competitive. His maiden Mini win and numerous podiums allowed him to finish fourth in the S Class Championship.

For 2006, Nordström's was fixed on winning the S Class title. In the 16 race season, he finished 14 times on the podium including three wins – a success for Nordström and the Advent Motorsport Team. In fact, Nordström finished every race to end the year with an enviable 100% points scoring record.

=== SEAT UK ===
In 2007, Nordström entered the SEAT Cupra UK Championship, a series known for developing top Saloon car talent. He quickly became a frontrunner for the R Class, finishing the year in fourth place with three wins and podium finishes in half of his races. In 2008, he returned to the SEAT Cupra Cup, driving a new SEAT León with support from PlumberTraining.co and continuing under Advent Motorsport.

=== SEAT Supercopa, Spain ===
With SEAT withdrawing the one make series in the UK, racing options were limited. After an upgrade to conform with the SEAT León Supercopa regulations, 2009 and 2010 saw Nordström racing on most tracks in Spain and Portugal for the 2010 SEAT León Supercopa Spain season and the following one. Racing was a challenge with 40+ entered cars of the same specification. The season was mixed with variable outcomes and quite a few mechanical issues. Nevertheless, this championship made Nordström ready for any future challenge and saw him taking on the current World Touring Car Cup (WTCC) driver 'Norby' Norbert Michelisz, TCR driver Pepe Oriola and Spanish superstar Oscar Nogués.

In addition Nordström entered the Brands Hatch rounds of the WTCC support race of the SEAT León Eurocup with good results. He was unfortunate to miss out on a second place by being given a drive through nine laps into the race for having a wheel outside the box on the starting grid. In spite of this he managed to claw his way back to sixth place. In this championship he raced against the Coronel twins.

=== British GT ===
After two years of travelling to Spain, Nordström joined Lotus Sport UK, together with Leyton Clarke for an entry in the British GT Championship. The car was the new Lotus Evora, which saw the pair finish third in the championship only losing second place by a team 'stealing' points by entering the final round. The season was a challenge with a variety of gremlins appearing for this unproven car.

=== NASCAR Whelen Euro Series ===
Having seen the Euro NASCAR at an exhibition at the Autosport show in Birmingham, Nordström joined the NASCAR Whelen Euro Series (various names during the years). Initially racing on mainly French circuits, the championship has grown over the years to now includes six European countries and drivers from a multitude of countries. After the first year Nordström joined the legendary, Le Mans winner Éric Hélary and his team RAPIDO RACING. This partnership lasted one and a half years until the team went into administration mid season which jeopardised the results. After a bad season in 2015, Nordström joined CAAL RACING who had a very strong track record of success. Unfortunately four crashes (two unavoidable on ovals) in 2016 hampered the season, but saw Nordström finish as high as sixth place in some races.

=== Other racing ===
In addition to the various championships Nordström has competed in, he has appeared in the following race series:

1. 2008 Caterham Roadsport
2. 2009 Abarth 500
3. 2011 Porsche Carrera Cup Great Britain
4. 2012 Silverstone Britcar 24-Hour (BMW M3 E46)
5. 2013 Dubai 24 Hour (BMW)
6. 2014 Dubai 24 Hour (BMW)
7. 2016 Dubai 24 Hour (Porsche 991 Cup)

== Racing record ==
Year	Championship	Team	Car
2003	T Car Championship	Advent Mtsp	T Car
2004	T Car Championship	Advent Mtsp	T Car
2005	John Cooper Challenge UK (rebranded later as Mini Challenge UK)	Advent Mtsp	Mini Cooper S
2006	Mini Challenge UK	Advent Mtsp	Mini Cooper S
2007	SEAT Cupra Championship	Advent Mtsp	SEAT Cupra R
2008	SEAT Cupra Championship	Advent Mtsp	SEAT Cupra R
2009	Spanish SEAT León Supercopa	Advent Mtsp	SEAT León Supercopa
2009	SEAT León Eurocup	Advent Mtsp	SEAT León Eurocup
2010	Spanish SEAT León Supercopa	Advent Mtsp	SEAT León Supercopa
2010	SEAT León Eurocup	Advent Mtsp	SEAT León Eurocup
2011	British GT Lotus Evora GT4	Lotus Sport UK	Lotus Evora
2012	NASCAR Whelen Euro Series	Orhès	Dodge Charger
2012	Mini Challenge UK	Advent Mtsp	Mini JCW
2013	NASCAR Whelen Euro Series	Rapido Racing	Ford Mustang
2014	NASCAR Whelen Euro Series	Rapido Racing	Chevrolet Camaro
2015	NASCAR Whelen Euro Series	GDL Racing	Ford Mustang
2016	NASCAR Whelen Euro Series	CAAL RACING	Chevrolet SS
2017	NASCAR Whelen Euro Series	CAAL RACING	Chevrolet SS
2018	NASCAR Whelen Euro Series	Mishumotors	Chevrolet SS
2018	GT Cup UK	EBOR 23	Maserati GT4

== Complete Racing results ==
=== NASCAR ===
(key) (Bold – Pole position awarded by qualifying time. Italics – Pole position earned by points standings or practice time. * – Most laps led.)

=== Whelen Euro Series – Elite 1 ===
NASCAR Whelen Euro Series – Elite 1 results
Year	Team	No.	Make	1	2	3	4	5	6	7	8	9	10	11	12	NWES	Points
2012	Orhès Competition	44	Dodge Charger	(France); NOG; 15	(France); NOG; 9	(United Kingdom); BH; 8	(United Kingdom); BH; 6	(Belgium); SPA; 7	(Belgium); SPA; 5	(Spain); VAL; 6	(Spain); VAL; 14	(France); LEM; 20	(France); LEM; 16			9th	512
2013	Rapido Racing	44	Ford Mustang	(France); NOG; 4	(France); NOG; 6	(France); DIJ; 3	(France); DIJ; 5	(United Kingdom); BH; 2	(United Kingdom); BH; 3							7th	543
2013	Rapido Racing	44	Chevrolet Camaro							(France); TOU; 20	(France); TOU; 20	(Italy); MON; 23	(Italy); MON; 10	(France); LEM; 9	(France); LEM; 16	7th	543
2014	Rapido Racing	44	Chevrolet Camaro	(Spain); VAL; 8	(Spain); VAL; 10	(United Kingdom); BH; 13	(United Kingdom); BH; 23	(France); TOU; 4	(France); TOU; 5	(Germany); NUR; 4	(Germany); NUR; 17	(Italy); UMB; 7	(Italy); UMB; 6	(France); LEM; 6	(France); LEM; 8	7th	567
2015	GDL Racing	44	Ford Mustang	(Spain); VAL; 16	(Spain); VAL; 17	(Netherlands); VEN; 9	(Netherlands); VEN; 11	(United Kingdom); BH; 12	(United Kingdom); BH; 9	(France); TOU; 9	(France); TOU; 13	(Italy); UMB; 8	(Italy); UMB; 12	(Belgium); ZOL	(Belgium); ZOL	16th	394
2016	CAAL Racing	44	Chevrolet SS	(Spain); VAL; 19	(Spain); VAL; 6	(Netherlands); VEN; 23	(Netherlands); VEN; 20	(United Kingdom); BH; 6	(United Kingdom); BH; 8	(France); TOU; 13	(France); TOU; 8	(Italy); VAL; 6	(Italy); VAL; 23	(Belgium); ZOL; 6	(Belgium); ZOL; 13	10th	494
2017	CAAL Racing	44	Chevrolet SS	(Spain); VAL; 7	(Spain); VAL; 9	(United Kingdom); BH; 17	(United Kingdom); BH; 8	(Netherlands); VEN; 14	(Netherlands); VEN; 11	(Germany); HOC; 19	(Germany); HOC; 10	(Italy); FC; 19	(Italy); FC; 23	(Belgium); ZOL; 8	(Belgium); ZOL; 21	10th	439

=== Whelen Euro Series – Elite 2 ===
NASCAR Whelen Euro Series – Elite 2 results
Year	Team	No.	Make	1	2	3	4	5	6	7	8	9	10	11	12	13	NWES2	Points
2018	Mishumotors	33	Chevrolet SS	(Spain); VAL	(Spain); VAL	(Italy); FR	(Italy); FR	(United Kingdom); BRH; 7	(United Kingdom); BRH; 3	(France); TOU	(France); TOU	(Germany); HOC	(Germany); HOC	(Belgium); ZOL	(Belgium); ZOL		30th	64
2019	PK Carsport	11	Chevrolet Camaro	(Spain); VAL	(Spain); VAL	(Italy); FRA	(Italy); FRA	(United Kingdom); BRH; 23	(United Kingdom); BRH; 13	(Czech Republic); MOS	(Czech Republic); MOS	(Netherlands); VEN	(Germany); HOC	(Germany); HOC	(Belgium); ZOL	(Belgium); ZOL	37th	38

=== British GT GT4 ===
British GT GT4 results
Year	Team	No.	Make	1	2	3	4	5	6	7	8	9	10	Position
2011	Lotus Sport UK	49	Lotus Evora	(United Kingdom); OP; 5	(United Kingdom); OP; 2	(United Kingdom); SNE; 2	(United Kingdom); BH; 2	(Belgium); SPA; 3	(Belgium); SPA; 6	(United Kingdom); ROC; 2	(United Kingdom); ROC; 4	(United Kingdom); DON; 6	(United Kingdom); SIL; 8	3rd

=== SEAT León Supercopa ===
(key) (Races in bold indicate pole position) (Races in italics indicate fastest lap)

==== Seat Cupra Championship UK ====
SEAT Cupra Championship UK – results
Year	Team	No.	Make	1	2	3	4	5	6	7	8	9	10	11	12	13	14	15	16	17	18	19	20	Position
Blaupunkt SEAT Cupra UK results
2007	Advent Motorsport	44	SEAT Cupra R	(United Kingdom); **BH**; 9	(United Kingdom); BH; 6	(United Kingdom); **ROC**; DNF	(United Kingdom); ROC; 1	(United Kingdom); THR; 1	(United Kingdom); **THR**; 1	(United Kingdom); CRO; DNF	(United Kingdom); CRO; 2	(United Kingdom); OP; 3	(United Kingdom); OP; 3	(United Kingdom); DON; DNF	(United Kingdom); DON; DNS	(United Kingdom); SNE; DNF	(United Kingdom); SNE; 2	(United Kingdom); **BH**; 4	(United Kingdom); BH; 4	(United Kingdom); KNO; 2	(United Kingdom); KNO; 4	(United Kingdom); THR; 2	(United Kingdom); THR; 2	4th
SEAT Cupra Championship UK results
2008	Advent Motorsport	44	SEAT Cupra R	(United Kingdom); BH; 10	(United Kingdom); BH; 5	(United Kingdom); ROC; DNF	(United Kingdom); ROC; 7	(United Kingdom); DON; DNF	(United Kingdom); DON; DNF	(United Kingdom); THR; 11	(United Kingdom); THR; 5	(United Kingdom); CRO; 8	(United Kingdom); SNE; 2	(United Kingdom); SNE; 6	(United Kingdom); SNE; DNF	(United Kingdom); OP; 11	(United Kingdom); OP; 9	(United Kingdom); KNO; 9	(United Kingdom); KNO; 9	(United Kingdom); SIL; 5	(United Kingdom); SIL; 8	(United Kingdom); BH; 5	(United Kingdom); BH; 7	8th

==== Seat León Supecopa Spain ====
SEAT León Supercopa Spain – results
Year	Team	No.	Make	1	2	3	4	5	6	7	8	9	10	11	12	13	14	15	16	17	18	Position
2009	Advent Motorsport	44	SEAT León Supercopa	(Spain); VAL; 33	(Spain); VAL; DNF	(Spain); VAL; 16	(Spain); JAR ?	(Spain); JAR; 15	(Spain); JAR; 13	(Portugal); POR; 13	(Portugal); POR; 19	(Portugal); POR; DNF	(Spain); ALB; 15	(Spain); ALB; 22	(Spain); ALB; DNS	(Spain); JER; DNF	(Spain); JER; DNS	(Spain); JER; DNS	(Spain); BAR; 17	(Spain); BAR; 20	(Spain); BAR; 13	26th
2010	Advent Motorsport	44	SEAT León Supercopa	(Spain); VAL; 21	(Spain); VAL; 27	(Spain); VAL; DNF	(Spain); JAR; DNF	(Spain); JAR; DNS	(Spain); JAR; DNF	(Portugal); POR; 17	(Portugal); POR; 18	(Portugal); POR; 14	(Spain); NAV; 14	(Spain); NAV; 13	(Spain); NAV; 8	(Spain); JER; 9	(Spain); JER; 14	(Spain); JER; 9	(Spain); BAR; 15	(Spain); BAR; 12	(Spain); BAR; 15	20th

==== Seat León Eurocup ====
SEAT León Eurocup – results
Year	Team	No.	Make	1	2	3	4	5	6	7	8	9	10	11	12	Position
2009	Advent Motorsport	44	SEAT León Eurocup	(Spain); VAL	(Spain); VAL	(Czech Republic); BRN	(Czech Republic); BRN	(Portugal); POR	(Portugal); POR	(United Kingdom); BRH; 5	(United Kingdom); BRH; 6	(Germany); OSC	(Germany); OSC	(Italy); IMO	(Italy); IMO	14th
2010	Advent Motorsport	44	SEAT León Eurocup	(Italy); MNZ	(Italy); MNZ	(Belgium); ZOL	(Belgium); ZOL	(United Kingdom); BRH; DNF	(United Kingdom); BRH; 14	(Czech Republic); BRN	(Czech Republic); BRN	(Germany); OSC	(Germany); OSC	(Spain); VAL	(Spain); VAL	34th

=== Mini Challenge ===
Mini Challenge UK results
Year	Team	No.	Make	1	2	3	4	5	6	7	8	9	10	11	12	13	14	15	16	17	18	19	20	Position
2005	Advent Motorsport	44	Mini Cooper S	(United Kingdom); DON; DNF	(United Kingdom); DON; 4	(United Kingdom); KNO; 3	(United Kingdom); KNO; 3	(United Kingdom); CRO; 3	(United Kingdom); CRO; 2	(United Kingdom); THR; 5	(United Kingdom); THR; 1	(United Kingdom); CAS; 4	(United Kingdom); CAS; 4	(Republic of Ireland); MON; 5	(Republic of Ireland); MON; 5	(United Kingdom); SIL; 4	(United Kingdom); SIL; 5	–	–	–	–	–	–	4th
2006	Advent Motorsport	44	Mini Cooper S	(United Kingdom); SNE; 7	(United Kingdom); SNE; 2	(United Kingdom); BH; 2	(United Kingdom); BH; 3	(United Kingdom); CAS; 3	(United Kingdom); CAS; 1	(United Kingdom); PEM; 2	(United Kingdom); PEM; 1	(United Kingdom); THR; 4	(United Kingdom); THR; 2	(United Kingdom); CRO; 3	(United Kingdom); CRO; 3	(Belgium); SPA; 1	(Belgium); SPA; 2	(United Kingdom); DON; 3	(United Kingdom); DON; 3	–	–	–	–	1st
2012	Advent Motorsport	44	Mini JCW	(United Kingdom); SIL	(United Kingdom); SIL	(United Kingdom); CAS	(United Kingdom); CAS	(United Kingdom); BHI; 9	(United Kingdom); BHI; 7	(United Kingdom); BHI; 4	(United Kingdom); SNE	(United Kingdom); SNE	(United Kingdom); SNE	(United Kingdom); SNE	(United Kingdom); OUL	(United Kingdom); OUL	(United Kingdom); BHGP	(United Kingdom); BHGP	(United Kingdom); BHGP	(United Kingdom); DON	(United Kingdom); DON	(United Kingdom); DON	(United Kingdom); DON	21st

=== T Car ===
T Car Championship results
Year	Team	No.	Make	1	2	3	4	5	6	7	8	9	10	11	12	13	14	15	16	17	18	19	20	21	22	23	24	Position
2003	Advent Motorsport	44	T Car	(United Kingdom); DON; 7	(United Kingdom); DON; DNS	(United Kingdom); BH; 5	(United Kingdom); BH; 5	(United Kingdom); LYD; 5	(United Kingdom); LYD; 5	(United Kingdom); CAD; 6	(United Kingdom); CAD; 5	(United Kingdom); SNE; 7	(United Kingdom); SNE; 7	(United Kingdom); MAL; 6	(United Kingdom); MAL; 7	(United Kingdom); ANG; 5	(United Kingdom); ANG; 5	(United Kingdom); ANG; 4	(United Kingdom); ANG; 5	(United Kingdom); OP; 5	(United Kingdom); OP; 4	(United Kingdom); CAS; 5	(United Kingdom); CAS; 8	(United Kingdom); SNE; 6	(United Kingdom); SNE; 6	(United Kingdom); SNE; 4	(United Kingdom); SNE; 7	5th
2004	Advent Motorsport	44	T Car	(United Kingdom); SNE; 2	(United Kingdom); SNE; 2	(United Kingdom); KNO; 3	(United Kingdom); KNO; 3	(United Kingdom); MAL; 3	(United Kingdom); MAL; 3	(United Kingdom); BH; 3	(United Kingdom); BH; 3	(United Kingdom); CAD; 2	(United Kingdom); CAD; 3	(Republic of Ireland); MON; 2	(Republic of Ireland); MON; 2	(United Kingdom); ANG; 3	(United Kingdom); ANG; 1	(United Kingdom); SNE; DNF	(United Kingdom); SNE; 9	(United Kingdom); DON; DNF	(United Kingdom); DON; DNS	(United Kingdom); BH; DNS	(United Kingdom); BH; DNS	-	-	-	-	4th

=== 24 Hours of Silverstone results ===
Year	Team	Co-Drivers	Car	Car No.	Class	Laps	Pos.	Class Pos.
2012	(United Kingdom) GP Motorsport	(United Kingdom) Guy Povey (United Kingdom) Nick Whale (United Kingdom) Harry Whale (United Kingdom) Westlie Harding	BMW M3 E46 GTR	70	3	297	25th/DNF	7th/DNF
