= 2025 Road to Le Mans =

Automobile endurance event

Circuit de la Sarthe track

The 10th Road to Le Mans was a sports car race held on 12 and 14 June 2025 at the Circuit de la Sarthe, Le Mans, France. The race featured LMP3 cars, split into the classes LMP3 and LMP3 Pro-Am, and grand tourer sports cars in the GT3 class. The races marked the Le Mans debut of the third-generation of LMP3 cars.

Through her outright victory in the second race of the event, Léna Bühler became the first woman to win a race in the Le Mans Cup.

== Entry list ==
| Icon | Series |
|---|---|
| MLMS | Michelin Le Mans Cup |
| ELMS | European Le Mans Series |
| GTWC | SRO GT World Challenge |
| ALMS | Asian Le Mans Series |
| RLMS | Road to Le Mans only |

| No. | Entrant | Car | Series | Driver 1 | Driver 2 |
LMP3 (23 entries)
| 3 | (Luxembourg) DKR Engineering | Ginetta G61-LT-P3 Evo - Toyota | MLMS | (United States) Wyatt Brichacek | (United Kingdom) Freddie Tomlinson |
| 4 | (United Kingdom) Nielsen Racing | ADESS AD25 - Toyota | MLMS | (Colombia) Henry Cubides | (Denmark) Mikkel Kristensen |
| 6 | (France) ANS Motorsport | Ligier JS P325 - Toyota | MLMS | (Switzerland) Axel Gnos | (Germany) Markus Pommer |
| 7 | (United Kingdom) Nielsen Racing | ADESS AD25 - Toyota | MLMS | (United Kingdom) Tom Fleming | (United Kingdom) Colin Noble |
| 8 | (Poland) Team Virage | Ligier JS P325 - Toyota | ELMS | (Denmark) Sebastian Gravlund | (Netherlands) Rik Koen |
| 12 | (Germany) WTM by Rinaldi Racing | Duqueine - D09 - Toyota | ELMS | (Australia) Griffin Peebles | (Italy) Valerio Rinicella |
| 16 | (Poland) Team Virage | Ligier JS P325 - Toyota | MLMS | (France) Sacha Lehmann | (United Kingdom) Theo Micouris |
| 20 | (Denmark) High Class Racing | Ligier JS P325 - Toyota | MLMS | (Denmark) Philip Lindberg | (Spain) Maximus Mayer |
| 25 | (Germany) Reiter Engineering | Ligier JS P325 - Toyota | MLMS | (Switzerland) Miklas Born | (Hungary) Bence Válint |
| 26 | (Czech Republic) Bretton Racing | Ligier JS P325 - Toyota | MLMS | (United Kingdom) Haydn Chance | (Switzerland) Grégory de Sybourg |
| 29 | (France) Forestier Racing by VPS | Ligier JS P325 - Toyota | MLMS | (France) Romain Favre | (France) Louis Rousset |
| 30 | (Spain) CD Sport | Duqueine - D09 - Toyota | MLMS | (France) Thomas Imbourg | (France) Arthur Rogeon |
| 37 | (Switzerland) CLX Motorsport | Ligier JS P325 - Toyota | ELMS | (France) Adrien Closmenil | (Denmark) Theodor Jensen |
| 50 | (France) 23Events Racing | Ligier JS P325 - Toyota | MLMS | (Switzerland) Léna Bühler | (Italy) Matteo Quintarelli |
| 53 | (Czech Republic) Bretton Racing | Ligier JS P325 - Toyota | ALMS | (France) Marius Fossard | (United Kingdom) Ewan Thomas |
| 68 | (France) M Racing | Ligier JS P325 - Toyota | ELMS | (France) Quentin Antonel | (France) Vladislav Lomko (Note: Lomko is Russian, but he competes under a French licence as Russian national emblems were banned by the FIA following the Russian invasion of Ukraine.) |
| 70 | (Germany) Gebhardt Motorsport | Duqueine - D09 - Toyota | MLMS | (Germany) Valentino Catalano | (Colombia) Óscar Tunjo |
| 74 | (Poland) Team Virage | Ligier JS P325 - Toyota | MLMS | (Switzerland) Samir Ben | (South Africa) Mikaeel Pitamber |
| 85 | (France) R-ace GP | Duqueine - D09 - Toyota | MLMS | (France) Hadrien David | (Germany) Hugo Schwarze |
| 86 | (France) R-ace GP | Duqueine - D09 - Toyota | MLMS | (Japan) Jin Nakamura | (France) Edgar Pierre |
| 87 | (Switzerland) CLX Motorsport | Ligier JS P325 - Toyota | MLMS | (France) Pierre-Alexandre Provost | (Italy) Alvise Rodella |
| 92 | (France) Forestier Racing by VPS | Ligier JS P325 - Toyota | MLMS | (France) Luciano Morano | (France) Charles Roussanne |
| 97 | (Switzerland) CLX Motorsport | Ligier JS P325 - Toyota | MLMS | (Switzerland) David Droux | (Switzerland) Cédric Oltramare |
LMP3 Pro-Am (20 entries)
| 2 | (Luxembourg) DKR Engineering | Ginetta G61-LT-P3 Evo - Toyota | ELMS | (France) Thomas Laurent | (Estonia) Antti Rammo |
| 10 | (Switzerland) Racing Spirit of Léman | Ligier JS P325 - Toyota | MLMS | (Germany) Sebastian Schmitt | (Germany) Dominik Schraml |
| 24 | (Italy) TS Corse | Duqueine - D09 - Toyota | MLMS | (Poland) Przemysław Pieniążek | (Poland) Robin Rogalski |
| 27 | (United Kingdom) P4 Racing | Ligier JS P325 - Toyota | MLMS | (United Kingdom) Andrew Ferguson | (United Kingdom) Louis Hamilton-Smith |
| 28 | (France) 23Events Racing | Ligier JS P325 - Toyota | MLMS | (France) Tim Mérieux | (United Kingdom) Terrence Woodward |
| 31 | (Spain) CD Sport | Duqueine - D09 - Toyota | MLMS | (Belgium) Stéphane Lémeret | (Switzerland) Kévin Rabin |
| 34 | (Poland) Inter Europol Competition | Ligier JS P325 - Toyota | MLMS | (Sweden) William Karlsson | (United Kingdom) Chris Short |
| 43 | (Poland) Inter Europol Competition | Ligier JS P325 - Toyota | ELMS | (Hong Kong) David Pun | (Brazil) Sérgio Sette Câmara |
| 49 | (Denmark) High Class Racing | Ligier JS P325 - Toyota | MLMS | (Denmark) Anders Fjordbach | (United States) Mark Patterson |
| 58 | (Australia) GG Classics | Ligier JS P325 - Toyota | MLMS | (Australia) George Nakas | (Australia) Fraser Ross |
| 62 | (Czech Republic) Bretton Racing | Ligier JS P325 - Toyota | MLMS | (Netherlands) Dane Arendsen | (United Kingdom) Ben Stone |
| 64 | (France) M Racing | Ligier JS P325 - Toyota | MLMS | (Austria) Michael Doppelmayr | (Germany) Pierre Kaffer |
| 66 | (Germany) Rinaldi Racing | Ligier JS P325 - Toyota | MLMS | (Germany) Steve Parrow | (Denmark) Mikkel Gaarde Pedersen |
| 71 | (Germany) Rinaldi Racing | Ligier JS P325 - Toyota | MLMS | (Germany) Stefan Aust | (Germany) Felipe Fernández Laser |
| 77 | (Germany) Reiter Engineering | Ligier JS P325 - Toyota | MLMS | (Austria) Horst Felbermayr Jr. | (Austria) Horst Felix Felbermayr |
| 84 | (France) ANS Motorsport | Ligier JS P325 - Toyota | MLMS | (France) Julien Lemoine | (France) Paul Trojani |
| 88 | (France) R-ace GP | Duqueine - D09 - Toyota | MLMS | (France) Fabien Lavergne | (France) Romano Ricci |
| 94 | (Denmark) High Class Racing | Ligier JS P325 - Toyota | ALMS | (United States) Seth Lucas | (Denmark) Jens Reno Møller |
| 98 | (Belgium) Motorsport98 | Ligier JS P325 - Toyota | MLMS | (Belgium) Eric De Doncker | (France) Gillian Henrion |
| 99 | (Netherlands) More Motorsport | Ligier JS P325 - Toyota | MLMS | (Netherlands) Mark van der Snel | (Netherlands) Max van der Snel |
GT3 (15 entries)
| 5 | (United Kingdom) Optimum Motorsport | McLaren 720S GT3 Evo | GTWC | (United Kingdom) Bradley Ellis | (United Kingdom) Nick Halstead |
| 11 | (France) Code Racing Development | Aston Martin Vantage AMR GT3 Evo | MLMS | (Austria) Philipp Sager | (United States) Rory van der Steur |
| 14 | (Germany) GetSpeed Performance | Mercedes-AMG GT3 Evo | ALMS | (Luxembourg) Steve Jans | (United States) Anthony Bartone |
| 17 | (Switzerland) Kessel Racing | Ferrari 296 GT3 | MLMS | (Italy) Andrea Belicchi | (Italy) Lorenzo Innocenti |
| 21 | (Italy) AF Corse | Ferrari 296 GT3 | RLMS | (Switzerland) Gino Forgione | (Italy) Michele Rugolo |
| 23 | (Spain) Biogas Motorsport | Ferrari 296 GT3 | MLMS | (Spain) Marc Carol | (Spain) Josep Mayola |
| 33 | (Switzerland) Kessel Racing | Ferrari 296 GT3 | MLMS | (Turkey) Murat Çuhadaroğlu | (Italy) David Fumanelli |
| 38 | (Belgium) Team WRT | BMW M4 GT3 Evo | GTWC | (Sweden) Gustav Bergström | (Canada) Samantha Tan |
| 51 | (Italy) AF Corse | Ferrari 296 GT3 | MLMS | (Italy) Alessandro Cozzi | (Italy) Eliseo Donno |
| 52 | (Italy) AF Corse | Ferrari 296 GT3 | RLMS | (Monaco) Vincent Abril | (Belgium) Laurent de Meeus |
| 55 | (Italy) AF Corse | Ferrari 296 GT3 | RLMS | (Italy) Leonardo Colavita | (Switzerland) Christoph Ulrich |
| 59 | (Switzerland) Racing Spirit of Léman | Aston Martin Vantage AMR GT3 Evo | ELMS | (United States) Anthony McIntosh | (Canada) Parker Thompson |
| 65 | (Austria) Team Motopark | Mercedes-AMG GT3 Evo | MLMS | (Austria) Lukas Dunner | (Germany) Heiko Neumann |
| 73 | (Germany) Iron Lynx – Proton | Porsche 911 GT3 R (992) | RLMS | (Italy) Matteo Cressoni | (Germany) Patrick Dinkeldein |
| 95 | (Italy) Ebimotors | Porsche 911 GT3 R (992) | MLMS | (Italy) Fabrizio Broggi | (Romania) Sergiu Nicolae |

The Iron Dames were slated to compete with Marta García and Vanina Ickx as drivers, but withdrew after Ickx fell ill. Car #73, entered by Iron Lynx and Proton Competition, replaced them.

== Qualifying ==
Provisional pole positions in each class are denoted in bold.

== Races ==
=== Race 1 result ===
| Pos | Class | No. | Team | Drivers | Chassis | Tyre | Laps | Time/Reason |
|---|---|---|---|---|---|---|---|---|
| 1 | LMP3 | 37 | (Switzerland) CLX Motorsport | (France) Adrien Closmenil (Denmark) Theodor Jensen | Ligier JS P325 | MI | 14 | 01:00:19.206 |
| 2 | LMP3 | 85 | (France) R-ace GP | (France) Hadrien David (Germany) Hugo Schwarze | Duqueine D09 | MI | 14 | +8.461 s |
| 3 | LMP3 | 16 | (Poland) Team Virage | (France) Sacha Lehmann (United Kingdom) Theo Micouris | Ligier JS P325 | MI | 14 | +13.860 s |
| 4 | LMP3 | 92 | (France) Forestier Racing by VPS | (France) Luciano Morano (France) Charles Roussanne | Ligier JS P325 | MI | 14 | +14.468 s |
| 5 | LMP3 | 29 | (France) Forestier Racing by VPS | (France) Romain Favre (France) Louis Rousset | Ligier JS P325 | MI | 14 | +15.533 s |
| 6 | LMP3 | 8 | (Poland) Team Virage | (Denmark) Sebastian Gravlund (Netherlands) Rik Koen | Ligier JS P325 | MI | 14 | +16.482 s |
| 7 | LMP3 | 50 | (France) 23Events Racing | (Switzerland) Léna Bühler (Italy) Matteo Quintarelli | Ligier JS P325 | MI | 14 | +21.972 s |
| 8 | LMP3 | 25 | (Germany) Reiter Engineering | (Switzerland) Miklas Born (Hungary) Bence Válint | Ligier JS P325 | MI | 14 | +31.750 s |
| 9 | LMP3 | 87 | (Switzerland) CLX Motorsport | (France) Pierre-Alexandre Provost (Italy) Alvise Rodella | Ligier JS P325 | MI | 14 | +32.080 s |
| 10 | LMP3 | 70 | (Germany) Gebhardt Motorsport | (Germany) Valentino Catalano (Colombia) Óscar Tunjo | Duqueine D09 | MI | 14 | +32.570 s |
| 11 | LMP3 | 68 | (France) M Racing | (France) Quentin Antonel (France) Vladislav Lomko | Ligier JS P325 | MI | 14 | +33.130 s |
| 12 | LMP3 | 74 | (Poland) Team Virage | (Switzerland) Samir Ben (South Africa) Mikaeel Pitamber | Ligier JS P325 | MI | 14 | +38.442 s |
| 13 | LMP3 | 26 | (Czech Republic) Bretton Racing | (United Kingdom) Haydn Chance (Switzerland) Grégory de Sybourg | Ligier JS P325 | MI | 14 | +39.352 s |
| 14 | LMP3 | 97 | (Switzerland) CLX Motorsport | (Switzerland) David Droux (Switzerland) Cédric Oltramare | Ligier JS P325 | MI | 14 | +41.503 s |
| 15 | LMP3 | 86 | (France) R-ace GP | (Japan) Jin Nakamura (France) Edgar Pierre | Duqueine D09 | MI | 14 | +41.987 s |
| 16 | LMP3 Pro-Am | 71 | (Germany) Rinaldi Racing | (Germany) Stefan Aust (Germany) Felipe Fernández Laser | Ligier JS P325 | MI | 14 | +52.883 s |
| 17 | LMP3 | 30 | (Spain) CD Sport | (France) Thomas Imbourg (France) Arthur Rogeon | Duqueine D09 | MI | 14 | +53.300 s |
| 18 | LMP3 | 3 | (Luxembourg) DKR Engineering | (United States) Wyatt Brichacek (United Kingdom) Freddie Tomlinson | Ginetta G61-LT-P3 Evo | MI | 14 | +1:00.631 s |
| 19 | LMP3 | 6 | (France) ANS Motorsport | (Switzerland) Axel Gnos (Germany) Markus Pommer | Ligier JS P325 | MI | 14 | +1:00.969 s |
| 20 | LMP3 Pro-AM | 2 | (Luxembourg) DKR Engineering | (France) Thomas Laurent (Estonia) Antti Rammo | Ginetta G61-LT-P3 Evo | MI | 14 | +1:06.894 s |
| 21 | LMP3 Pro-AM | 98 | (Belgium) Motorsport98 | (Belgium) Eric De Doncker (France) Gillian Henrion | Ligier JS P325 | MI | 14 | +1:12.769 s |
| 22 | LMP3 Pro-AM | 28 | (France) 23Events Racing | (France) Tim Mérieux (United Kingdom) Terrence Woodward | Ligier JS P325 | MI | 14 | +1:15.652 s |
| 23 | LMP3 Pro-AM | 34 | (Poland) Inter Europol Competition | (Sweden) William Karlsson (United Kingdom) Chris Short | Ligier JS P325 | MI | 14 | +1:29.132 s |
| 24 | LMP3 | 20 | (Denmark) High Class Racing | (Denmark) Philip Lindberg (Spain) Maximus Mayer | Ligier JS P325 | MI | 14 | +1:30.094 s |
| 25 | LMP3 Pro-AM | 77 | (Germany) Reiter Engineering | (Austria) Horst Felbermayr Jr. (Austria) Horst Felix Felbermayr | Ligier JS P325 | MI | 14 | +1:30.495 s |
| 26 | LMP3 Pro-AM | 66 | (Germany) Rinaldi Racing | (Germany) Steve Parrow (Denmark) Mikkel Gaarde Pedersen | Ligier JS P325 | MI | 14 | +1:36.517 s |
| 27 | LMP3 Pro-AM | 88 | (France) R-ace GP | (France) Fabien Lavergne (France) Romano Ricci | Duqueine D09 | MI | 14 | +1:43.529 s |
| 28 | LMP3 Pro-AM | 84 | (France) ANS Motorsport | (France) Julien Lemoine (France) Paul Trojani | Ligier JS P325 | MI | 14 | +1:55.203 s |
| 29 | LMP3 Pro-AM | 43 | (Poland) Inter Europol Competition | (Hong Kong) David Pun (Brazil) Sérgio Sette Câmara | Ligier JS P325 | MI | 14 | +2:03.827 s |
| 30 | LMP3 Pro-AM | 94 | (Denmark) High Class Racing | (United States) Seth Lucas (Denmark) Jens Reno Møller | Ligier JS P325 | MI | 14 | +2:06.553 s |
| 31 | LMP3 Pro-AM | 31 | (Spain) CD Sport | (Belgium) Stéphane Lémeret (Switzerland) Kévin Rabin | Duqueine D09 | MI | 14 | +2:10.091 s |
| 32 | LMP3 Pro-AM | 99 | (Netherlands) More Motorsport | (Netherlands) Mark van der Snel (Netherlands) Max van der Snel | Ligier JS P325 | MI | 14 | +2:10.333 s |
| 33 | LMP3 Pro-AM | 27 | (United Kingdom) P4 Racing | (United Kingdom) Andrew Ferguson (United Kingdom) Louis Hamilton-Smith | Ligier JS P325 | MI | 14 | +2:15.878 s |
| 34 | LMP3 Pro-AM | 62 | (Czech Republic) Bretton Racing | (Netherlands) Dane Arendsen (United Kingdom) Ben Stone | Ligier JS P325 | MI | 14 | +2:20.343 s |
| 35 | LMP3 | 7 | (United Kingdom) Nielsen Racing | (United Kingdom) Tom Fleming (United Kingdom) Colin Noble | ADESS AD25 | MI | 14 | +2:22.590 s |
| 36 | GT3 | 14 | (Germany) GetSpeed Performance | (Luxembourg) Steve Jans (United States) Anthony Bartone | Mercedes-AMG GT3 Evo | MI | 14 | +2:35.404 s |
| 37 | LMP3 Pro-AM | 24 | (Italy) TS Corse | (Poland) Przemysław Pieniążek (Poland) Robin Rogalski | Duqueine D09 | MI | 14 | +2:36.296 s |
| 38 | GT3 | 51 | (Italy) AF Corse | (Italy) Alessandro Cozzi (Italy) Eliseo Donno | Ferrari 296 GT3 | MI | 14 | +2:36.523 s |
| 39 | GT3 | 59 | (Switzerland) Racing Spirit of Léman | (United States) Anthony McIntosh (Canada) Parker Thompson | Aston Martin Vantage AMR GT3 Evo | MI | 14 | +2:37.441 s |
| 40 | GT3 | 17 | (Switzerland) Kessel Racing | (Italy) Andrea Belicchi (Italy) Lorenzo Innocenti | Ferrari 296 GT3 | MI | 14 | +2:37.860 s |
| 41 | GT3 | 73 | (Germany) Iron Lynx – Proton | (Italy) Matteo Cressoni (Germany) Patrick Dinkeldein | Porsche 911 GT3 R (992) | MI | 14 | +2:55.019 s |
| 42 | GT3 | 38 | (Belgium) Team WRT | (Sweden) Gustav Bergström (Canada) Samantha Tan | BMW M4 GT3 Evo | MI | 14 | +2:59.172 s |
| 43 | LMP3 Pro-AM | 49 | (Denmark) High Class Racing | (Denmark) Anders Fjordbach (United States) Mark Patterson | Ligier JS P325 | MI | 14 | +3:12.248 s |
| 44 | GT3 | 95 | (Italy) Ebimotors | (Italy) Fabrizio Broggi (Romania) Sergiu Nicolae | Porsche 911 GT3 R (992) | MI | 14 | +3:16.894 s |
| 45 | GT3 | 23 | (Spain) Biogas Motorsport | (Spain) Marc Carol (Spain) Josep Mayola | Ferrari 296 GT3 | MI | 14 | +3:16.980 s |
| 46 | GT3 | 11 | (France) Code Racing Development | (Austria) Philipp Sager (United States) Rory van der Steur | Aston Martin Vantage AMR GT3 Evo | MI | 14 | +3:17.229 s |
| 47 | GT3 | 55 | (Italy) AF Corse | (Italy) Leonardo Colavita (Switzerland) Christoph Ulrich | Ferrari 296 GT3 | MI | 14 | +3:22.370 s |
| 48 | GT3 | 52 | (Italy) AF Corse | (Monaco) Vincent Abril (Belgium) Laurent de Meeus | Ferrari 296 GT3 | MI | 14 | +3:27.856 s |
| 49 | GT3 | 21 | (Italy) AF Corse | (Switzerland) Gino Forgione (Italy) Michele Rugolo | Ferrari 296 GT3 | MI | 14 | +3:34.958 s |
| 50 | GT3 | 65 | (Austria) Team Motopark | (Austria) Lukas Dunner (Germany) Heiko Neumann | Mercedes-AMG GT3 Evo | MI | 14 | +4:20.570 s |
| 51 | GT3 | 5 | (United Kingdom) Optimum Motorsport | (United Kingdom) Bradley Ellis (United Kingdom) Nick Halstead | McLaren 720S GT3 Evo | MI | 14 | +4:41.530 s |
| 52 | LMP3 Pro-Am | 64 | (France) M Racing | (Austria) Michael Doppelmayr (Germany) Pierre Kaffer | Ligier JS P325 | MI | 13 | +1 Lap |
| DNF | LMP3 | 53 | (Czech Republic) Bretton Racing | (France) Marius Fossard (United Kingdom) Ewan Thomas | Ligier JS P325 | MI | 4 | |
| DNF | LMP3 Pro-Am | 10 | (Switzerland) Racing Spirit of Léman | (Germany) Sebastian Schmitt (Germany) Dominik Schraml | Ligier JS P325 | MI | 2 | |
| DNF | LMP3 | 12 | (Germany) WTM by Rinaldi Racing | (Australia) Griffin Peebles (Italy) Valerio Rinicella | Duqueine D09 | MI | 0 | |
| DNF | LMP3 | 4 | (United Kingdom) Nielsen Racing | (Colombia) Henry Cubides (Denmark) Mikkel Kristensen | ADESS AD25 | MI | 0 | |
| DNS | LMP3 Pro-Am | 58 | (Australia) GG Classics | (Australia) George Nakas (Australia) Fraser Ross | Ligier JS P325 | MI | – | |

=== Race 2 result ===
| Pos | Class | No. | Team | Drivers | Chassis | Tyre | Laps | Time/Reason |
|---|---|---|---|---|---|---|---|---|
| 1 | LMP3 | 50 | (France) 23Events Racing | (Switzerland) Léna Bühler (Italy) Matteo Quintarelli | Ligier JS P325 | MI | 10 | 01:01:23.195 |
| 2 | LMP3 | 85 | (France) R-ace GP | (France) Hadrien David (Germany) Hugo Schwarze | Duqueine D09 | MI | 10 | +0.531 s |
| 3 | LMP3 | 70 | (Germany) Gebhardt Motorsport | (Germany) Valentino Catalano (Colombia) Óscar Tunjo | Duqueine D09 | MI | 10 | +2.493 s |
| 4 | LMP3 | 92 | (France) Forestier Racing by VPS | (France) Luciano Morano (France) Charles Roussanne | Ligier JS P325 | MI | 10 | +3.011 s |
| 5 | LMP3 | 25 | (Germany) Reiter Engineering | (Switzerland) Miklas Born (Hungary) Bence Válint | Ligier JS P325 | MI | 10 | +4.575 s |
| 6 | LMP3 | 16 | (Poland) Team Virage | (France) Sacha Lehmann (United Kingdom) Theo Micouris | Ligier JS P325 | MI | 10 | +5.594 s |
| 7 | LMP3 | 68 | (France) M Racing | (France) Quentin Antonel (France) Vladislav Lomko | Ligier JS P325 | MI | 10 | +6.977 s |
| 8 | LMP3 | 12 | (Germany) WTM by Rinaldi Racing | (Australia) Griffin Peebles (Italy) Valerio Rinicella | Duqueine D09 | MI | 10 | +7.340 s |
| 9 | LMP3 Pro-Am | 2 | (Luxembourg) DKR Engineering | (France) Thomas Laurent (Estonia) Antti Rammo | Ginetta G61-LT-P3 Evo | MI | 10 | +8.145 s |
| 10 | LMP3 Pro-Am | 71 | (Germany) Rinaldi Racing | (Germany) Stefan Aust (Germany) Felipe Fernández Laser | Ligier JS P325 | MI | 10 | +8.753 s |
| 11 | LMP3 | 74 | (Poland) Team Virage | (Switzerland) Samir Ben (South Africa) Mikaeel Pitamber | Ligier JS P325 | MI | 10 | +9.093 s |
| 12 | LMP3 | 20 | (Denmark) High Class Racing | (Denmark) Philip Lindberg (Spain) Maximus Mayer | Ligier JS P325 | MI | 10 | +9.388 s |
| 13 | LMP3 Pro-Am | 88 | (France) R-ace GP | (France) Fabien Lavergne (France) Romano Ricci | Duqueine D09 | MI | 10 | +11.341 s |
| 14 | LMP3 | 29 | (France) Forestier Racing by VPS | (France) Romain Favre (France) Louis Rousset | Ligier JS P325 | MI | 10 | +11.671 s |
| 15 | LMP3 Pro-Am | 98 | (Belgium) Motorsport98 | (Belgium) Eric De Doncker (France) Gillian Henrion | Ligier JS P325 | MI | 10 | +12.140 s |
| 16 | LMP3 Pro-Am | 34 | (Poland) Inter Europol Competition | (Sweden) William Karlsson (United Kingdom) Chris Short | Ligier JS P325 | MI | 10 | +13.566 s |
| 17 | LMP3 | 53 | (Czech Republic) Bretton Racing | (France) Marius Fossard (United Kingdom) Ewan Thomas | Ligier JS P325 | MI | 10 | +15.552 s |
| 18 | LMP3 | 30 | (Spain) CD Sport | (France) Thomas Imbourg (France) Arthur Rogeon | Duqueine D09 | MI | 10 | +16.009 s |
| 19 | LMP3 | 26 | (Czech Republic) Bretton Racing | (United Kingdom) Haydn Chance (Switzerland) Grégory de Sybourg | Ligier JS P325 | MI | 10 | +17.645 s |
| 20 | LMP3 Pro-AM | 99 | (Netherlands) More Motorsport | (Netherlands) Mark van der Snel (Netherlands) Max van der Snel | Ligier JS P325 | MI | 10 | +17.993 s |
| 21 | LMP3 | 7 | (United Kingdom) Nielsen Racing | (United Kingdom) Tom Fleming (United Kingdom) Colin Noble | ADESS AD25 | MI | 10 | +18.691 s |
| 22 | LMP3 Pro-AM | 43 | (Poland) Inter Europol Competition | (Hong Kong) David Pun (Brazil) Sérgio Sette Câmara | Ligier JS P325 | MI | 10 | +18.956 s |
| 23 | LMP3 Pro-AM | 84 | (France) ANS Motorsport | (France) Julien Lemoine (France) Paul Trojani | Ligier JS P325 | MI | 10 | +19.422 s |
| 24 | LMP3 Pro-Am | 49 | (Denmark) High Class Racing | (Denmark) Anders Fjordbach (United States) Mark Patterson | Ligier JS P325 | MI | 10 | +19.923 s |
| 25 | LMP3 Pro-AM | 94 | (Denmark) High Class Racing | (United States) Seth Lucas (Denmark) Jens Reno Møller | Ligier JS P325 | MI | 10 | +21.033 s |
| 26 | LMP3 Pro-AM | 77 | (Germany) Reiter Engineering | (Austria) Horst Felbermayr Jr. (Austria) Horst Felix Felbermayr | Ligier JS P325 | MI | 10 | +21.686 s |
| 27 | LMP3 | 4 | (United Kingdom) Nielsen Racing | (Colombia) Henry Cubides (Denmark) Mikkel Kristensen | ADESS AD25 | MI | 10 | +24.103 s |
| 28 | LMP3 | 3 | (Luxembourg) DKR Engineering | (United States) Wyatt Brichacek (United Kingdom) Freddie Tomlinson | Ginetta G61-LT-P3 Evo | MI | 10 | +24.226 s |
| 29 | GT3 | 65 | (Austria) Team Motopark | (Austria) Lukas Dunner (Germany) Heiko Neumann | Mercedes-AMG GT3 Evo | MI | 10 | +24.653 s |
| 30 | GT3 | 5 | (United Kingdom) Optimum Motorsport | (United Kingdom) Bradley Ellis (United Kingdom) Nick Halstead | McLaren 720S GT3 Evo | MI | 10 | +25.567 s |
| 31 | LMP3 Pro-AM | 31 | (Spain) CD Sport | (Belgium) Stéphane Lémeret (Switzerland) Kévin Rabin | Duqueine D09 | MI | 10 | +29.063 s |
| 32 | LMP3 Pro-AM | 10 | (Switzerland) Racing Spirit of Léman | (Germany) Sebastian Schmitt (Germany) Dominik Schraml | Ligier JS P325 | MI | 10 | +29.589 s |
| 33 | LMP3 Pro-AM | 62 | (Czech Republic) Bretton Racing | (Netherlands) Dane Arendsen (United Kingdom) Ben Stone | Ligier JS P325 | MI | 10 | +29.765 s |
| 34 | LMP3 | 97 | (Switzerland) CLX Motorsport | (Switzerland) David Droux (Switzerland) Cédric Oltramare | Ligier JS P325 | MI | 10 | +29.983 s |
| 35 | GT3 | 52 | (Italy) AF Corse | (Monaco) Vincent Abril (Belgium) Laurent de Meeus | Ferrari 296 GT3 | MI | 10 | +30.557 s |
| 36 | GT3 | 38 | (Belgium) Team WRT | (Sweden) Gustav Bergström (Canada) Samantha Tan | BMW M4 GT3 Evo | MI | 10 | +31.064 s |
| 37 | GT3 | 51 | (Italy) AF Corse | (Italy) Alessandro Cozzi (Italy) Eliseo Donno | Ferrari 296 GT3 | MI | 10 | +31.626 s |
| 38 | LMP3 | 8 | (Poland) Team Virage | (Denmark) Sebastian Gravlund (Netherlands) Rik Koen | Ligier JS P325 | MI | 10 | +36.948 s |
| 39 | GT3 | 95 | (Italy) Ebimotors | (Italy) Fabrizio Broggi (Romania) Sergiu Nicolae | Porsche 911 GT3 R (992) | MI | 10 | +39.336 s |
| 40 | LMP3 | 6 | (France) ANS Motorsport | (Switzerland) Axel Gnos (Germany) Markus Pommer | Ligier JS P325 | MI | 10 | +40.440 s |
| 41 | LMP3 Pro-Am | 64 | (France) M Racing | (Austria) Michael Doppelmayr (Germany) Pierre Kaffer | Ligier JS P325 | MI | 10 | +40.691 s |
| 42 | GT3 | 55 | (Italy) AF Corse | (Italy) Leonardo Colavita (Switzerland) Christoph Ulrich | Ferrari 296 GT3 | MI | 10 | +41.393 s |
| 43 | LMP3 | 87 | (Switzerland) CLX Motorsport | (France) Pierre-Alexandre Provost (Italy) Alvise Rodella | Ligier JS P325 | MI | 10 | +41.611 s |
| 44 | LMP3 Pro-Am | 24 | (Italy) TS Corse | (Poland) Przemysław Pieniążek (Poland) Robin Rogalski | Duqueine D09 | MI | 10 | +45.049 s |
| 45 | GT3 | 17 | (Switzerland) Kessel Racing | (Italy) Andrea Belicchi (Italy) Lorenzo Innocenti | Ferrari 296 GT3 | MI | 10 | +48.304 s |
| 46 | LMP3 Pro-Am | 58 | (Australia) GG Classics | (Australia) George Nakas (Australia) Fraser Ross | Ligier JS P325 | MI | 10 | +50.469 s |
| 47 | LMP3 Pro-Am | 27 | (United Kingdom) P4 Racing | (United Kingdom) Andrew Ferguson (United Kingdom) Louis Hamilton-Smith | Ligier JS P325 | MI | 10 | +50.610 s |
| 48 | GT3 | 14 | (Germany) GetSpeed Performance | (Luxembourg) Steve Jans (United States) Anthony Bartone | Mercedes-AMG GT3 Evo | MI | 10 | +1:07.352 s |
| 49 | GT3 | 73 | (Germany) Iron Lynx – Proton | (Italy) Matteo Cressoni (Germany) Patrick Dinkeldein | Porsche 911 GT3 R (992) | MI | 8 | +2 Laps |
| DNF | LMP3 Pro-Am | 66 | (Germany) Rinaldi Racing | (Germany) Steve Parrow (Denmark) Mikkel Gaarde Pedersen | Ligier JS P325 | MI | 9 | |
| DNF | LMP3 Pro-Am | 28 | (France) 23Events Racing | (France) Tim Mérieux (United Kingdom) Terrence Woodward | Ligier JS P325 | MI | 8 | |
| DNF | LMP3 | 37 | (Switzerland) CLX Motorsport | (France) Adrien Closmenil (Denmark) Theodor Jensen | Ligier JS P325 | MI | 7 | |
| DNF | GT3 | 33 | (Switzerland) Kessel Racing | (Turkey) Murat Çuhadaroğlu (Italy) David Fumanelli | Ferrari 296 GT3 | MI | 5 | |
| DNF | GT3 | 11 | (France) Code Racing Development | (Austria) Philipp Sager (United States) Rory van der Steur | Aston Martin Vantage AMR GT3 Evo | MI | 5 | |
| DNF | LMP3 | 86 | (France) R-ace GP | (Japan) Jin Nakamura (France) Edgar Pierre | Duqueine D09 | MI | 4 | |
| DNF | GT3 | 23 | (Spain) Biogas Motorsport | (Spain) Marc Carol (Spain) Josep Mayola | Ferrari 296 GT3 | MI | 0 | |
| DNF | GT3 | 21 | (Italy) AF Corse | (Switzerland) Gino Forgione (Italy) Michele Rugolo | Ferrari 296 GT3 | MI | 0 | |
| DNF | GT3 | 59 | (Switzerland) Racing Spirit of Léman | (United States) Anthony McIntosh (Canada) Parker Thompson | Aston Martin Vantage AMR GT3 Evo | MI | 0 | |

== See also ==
- 2025 24 Hours of Le Mans
- 2025 IMSA Ford Mustang Challenge
