= 2011 FIA WTCC Race of Belgium =

Race details
- Round 2 of 12 in the 2011 World Touring Car Championship at Circuit Zolder in Zolder, Belgium.
- Date: 24 April, 2011
- Location: Zolder, Belgium
- Course: Circuit Zolder; 4.011 kilometres (2.492 mi)

Race One
- Laps: 15
Pole position
Driver		(United Kingdom) Robert Huff	Chevrolet RML
Time		1:38.458	
Podium
First		(United Kingdom) Robert Huff	Chevrolet RML
Second		(Switzerland) Alain Menu	Chevrolet RML
Third		(France) Yvan Muller	Chevrolet RML
Fastest Lap
Driver		(United Kingdom) Robert Huff	Chevrolet RML
Time		1:39.517	

Race Two
- Laps: 13
Podium
First		(Italy) Gabriele Tarquini	Lukoil-SUNRED
Second		(Switzerland) Alain Menu	Chevrolet RML
Third		(Portugal) Tiago Monteiro	SUNRED Engineering
Fastest Lap
Driver		(Spain) Javier Villa	Proteam Racing
Time		1:40.063	

The 2011 FIA WTCC Race of Belgium (formally the 2011 FIA WTCC Monroe Race of Belgium) was the second round of the 2011 World Touring Car Championship season. It was held at Circuit Zolder on 24 April 2011 and was the third running of the Race of Belgium, which ran at the Spa-Francorchamps circuit in 2005 before leaving the calendar for four seasons until returning in the 2010 season at Zolder.

The races were won by Robert Huff of Chevrolet RML and Gabriele Tarquini of Lukoil-SUNRED.

== Background ==
After the Race of Brazil, Huff was leading the drivers' championship by four points over Chevrolet teammate Alain Menu. Kristian Poulsen was leading the Yokohama Independents' Trophy.

Chevrolet RML reverted to a three car operation having run guest driver Cacá Bueno in Brazil. bamboo–engineering switched to the Chevrolet Cruze 1.6T, replacing the Chevrolet Lacettis they ran in the opening round. Wiechers-Sport returned to the series with their new driver Urs Sonderegger in a BMW 320 TC. Norbert Michelisz and the Zengő-Dension Team returned with a turbocharged BMW having missed the opening round to test the new car.

== Report ==
=== Testing and free practice ===
The test session on Friday saw Tarquini go fastest, leading Menu and championship leader Huff.

Huff was quickest in the free practice session on Saturday morning with Yvan Muller second making it a Chevrolet 1–2.

Muller led Huff and Menu in the final free practice session with Michel Nykjær the fastest SEAT driver in fourth. Fabio Fabiani missed the breaking point for turn one during the session, he ended up rolling backwards into the car but continued.

=== Qualifying ===
Chevrolet stayed on top in qualifying with Huff taking his second pole position of the year. Tiago Monteiro had been quickest in Q1 but Brazil podium finisher Tom Coronel failed to get through to the second session and lined up eleventh. Having been fourth in the afternoon practice session, Nykjær ended up 20th having not set a time. He had clipped one of the barriers at the chicane and was unable to continue in the session due to damage. Javier Villa didn't take part in qualifying due to engine issues.

In Q2, Huff set the fastest time to secure pole position and a late lap from Menu made it an all–Chevrolet front row. Tarquini finished third and Muller fourth, having run wide on his final flying lap. Monteiro was fifth and Poulsen in sixth was the leading independent driver. Michelisz was seventh in his first competitive session with the BMW.

=== Warm-Up ===
Proteam Racing's Villa topped the Sunday morning warm–up session with pole sitter Huff third.

=== Race One ===
The first race saw many drivers crash out and end their races prematurely. At the beginning Huff had a great get away from pole whilst Tarquini attempted to pass Menu put failed. Coronel had got a great get way but spun on the third lap and was hit by Franz Engstler. The damage was so much that Coronel wouldn't start race two. Meanwhile, further down the order, Aleksei Dudukalo and Yukinori Taniguchi were racing hard until Dudukalo put the Chevrolet into a small spin where Marchy Lee collected Taniguchi. Taniguchi managed to continue on in the race but Lee had to make a retirement. On lap eleven Poulsen and Michelisz were having a door to door battle, while Muller slipped past Tarquini for third. On the final lap Villa (who had started at the back of the grid) passed Darryl O'Young for ninth whilst Huff upfront took his second victory of the season.

=== Race Two ===
In race two there were new complications with the grid as Fredy Barth who was set for pole position had too much damage to compete along with others. This meant a reshuffle of the grid putting Tarquini on pole. Tarquini kept the three Chevrolets behind him at bay for thirteen laps despite a battle with Huff on lap five where the two made contact that would send Huff down to sixth by the end of the race due to the damage from the collision. O'Young was working his way up the order from ninth and finished the race fourth after Muller started to suffer problems and retired. This left Menu to fight for the win with Tarquini but was not good enough and behind them Monteiro completed the podium positions.

== Results ==
=== Qualifying ===
Pos.	No.	Name	Team	Car	C	Q1	Q2
1	2	(United Kingdom) Robert Huff	Chevrolet RML	Chevrolet Cruze 1.6T		1:39.373	1:38.458
2	8	(Switzerland) Alain Menu	Chevrolet RML	Chevrolet Cruze 1.6T		1:39.367	1:38.598
3	3	(Italy) Gabriele Tarquini	Lukoil-SUNRED	SEAT León 2.0 TDI		1:39.493	1:38.723
4	1	(France) Yvan Muller	Chevrolet RML	Chevrolet Cruze 1.6T		1:39.365	1:38.738
5	18	(Portugal) Tiago Monteiro	SUNRED Engineering	SEAT León 2.0 TDI		1:38.952	1:38.907
6	11	(Denmark) Kristian Poulsen	Liqui Moly Team Engstler	BMW 320 TC	Y	1:39.293	1:39.398
7	5	(Hungary) Norbert Michelisz	Zengő-Dension Team	BMW 320 TC	Y	1:39.417	1:39.450
8	12	(Germany) Franz Engstler	Liqui Moly Team Engstler	BMW 320 TC	Y	1:39.583	1:39.962
9	7	(Switzerland) Fredy Barth	SEAT Swiss Racing by SUNRED	SEAT León 2.0 TDI	Y	1:39.638	1:40.015
10	25	(Morocco) Mehdi Bennani	Proteam Racing	BMW 320 TC	Y	1:39.328	1:40.438
11	15	(Netherlands) Tom Coronel	ROAL Motorsport	BMW 320 TC		1:39.680	
12	74	(Spain) Pepe Oriola	SUNRED Engineering	SEAT León 2.0 TDI	Y	1:39.780	
13	30	(Sweden) Robert Dahlgren	Polestar Racing	Volvo C30		1:39.807	
14	9	(Hong Kong) Darryl O'Young	bamboo-engineering	Chevrolet Cruze 1.6T	Y	1:39.931	
15	4	(Russia) Aleksei Dudukalo	Lukoil-SUNRED	SEAT León 2.0 TDI	Y	1:40.110	
16	65	(Hong Kong) Marchy Lee	DeTeam KK Motorsport	BMW 320 TC	Y	1:40.406	
17	10	(Japan) Yukinori Taniguchi	bamboo-engineering	Chevrolet Cruze 1.6T	Y	1:41.712	
18	35	(Switzerland) Urs Sonderegger	Wiechers-Sport	BMW 320 TC	Y	1:43.537	
19	21	(Italy) Fabio Fabiani	Proteam Racing	BMW 320si	Y	1:44.820	
20	17	(Denmark) Michel Nykjær	SUNRED Engineering	SEAT León 2.0 TDI	Y	no time set	
21	20	(Spain) Javier Villa	Proteam Racing	BMW 320 TC	Y	no time set	

=== Race 1 ===
Pos.	No.	Name	Team	Car	C	Laps	Time/Retired	Grid	Points
1	2	(United Kingdom) **Robert Huff**	Chevrolet RML	Chevrolet Cruze 1.6T		15	29:18.807	1	25
2	8	(Switzerland) Alain Menu	Chevrolet RML	Chevrolet Cruze 1.6T		15	+1.244	2	18
3	1	(France) Yvan Muller	Chevrolet RML	Chevrolet Cruze 1.6T		15	+1.740	4	15
4	3	(Italy) Gabriele Tarquini	Lukoil-SUNRED	SEAT León 2.0 TDI		15	+3.790	3	12
5	18	(Portugal) Tiago Monteiro	SUNRED Engineering	SEAT León 2.0 TDI		15	+5.102	5	10
6	11	(Denmark) Kristian Poulsen	Liqui Moly Team Engstler	BMW 320 TC	Y	15	+8.987	6	8
7	5	(Hungary) Norbert Michelisz	Zengő-Dension Team	BMW 320 TC	Y	15	+10.878	7	6
8	17	(Denmark) Michel Nykjær	SUNRED Engineering	SEAT León 2.0 TDI	Y	15	+12.032	20	4
9	20	(Spain) Javier Villa	Proteam Racing	BMW 320 TC	Y	15	+12.845	21	2
10	9	(Hong Kong) Darryl O'Young	bamboo-engineering	Chevrolet Cruze 1.6T	Y	15	+12.901	14	1
11	74	(Spain) Pepe Oriola	SUNRED Engineering	SEAT León 2.0 TDI	Y	15	+14.656	12	
12	4	(Russia) Aleksei Dudukalo	Lukoil-SUNRED	SEAT León 2.0 TDI	Y	15	+17.538	15	
13	30	(Sweden) Robert Dahlgren	Polestar Racing	Volvo C30		15	+18.687	13	
14	10	(Japan) Yukinori Taniguchi	bamboo-engineering	Chevrolet Cruze 1.6T	Y	15	+25.864	17	
15	35	(Switzerland) Urs Sonderegger	Wiechers-Sport	BMW 320 TC	Y	15	+42.236	18	
16	21	(Italy) Fabio Fabiani	Proteam Racing	BMW 320si	Y	15	+1:07.741	19	
Ret	7	(Switzerland) Fredy Barth	SEAT Swiss Racing by SUNRED	SEAT León 2.0 TDI	Y	2	Race incident	9	
Ret	15	(Netherlands) Tom Coronel	ROAL Motorsport	BMW 320 TC		2	Race incident	11	
Ret	25	(Morocco) Mehdi Bennani	Proteam Racing	BMW 320 TC	Y	2	Race incident	10	
Ret	12	(Germany) Franz Engstler	Liqui Moly Team Engstler	BMW 320 TC	Y	2	Race incident	8	
Ret	65	(Hong Kong) Marchy Lee	DeTeam KK Motorsport	BMW 320 TC	Y	2	Race incident	16	

- **Bold** denotes Fastest lap.

=== Race 2 ===
Pos.	No.	Name	Team	Car	C	Laps	Time/Retired	Grid	Points
1	3	(Italy) Gabriele Tarquini	Lukoil-SUNRED	SEAT León 2.0 TDI		13	22:07.752	1	25
2	8	(Switzerland) Alain Menu	Chevrolet RML	Chevrolet Cruze 1.6T		13	+0.448	3	18
3	18	(Portugal) Tiago Monteiro	SUNRED Engineering	SEAT León 2.0 TDI		13	+0.886	6	15
4	9	(Hong Kong) Darryl O'Young	bamboo-engineering	Chevrolet Cruze 1.6T	Y	13	+1.614	9	12
5	17	(Denmark) Michel Nykjær	SUNRED Engineering	SEAT León 2.0 TDI	Y	13	+5.702	13	10
6	2	(United Kingdom) Robert Huff	Chevrolet RML	Chevrolet Cruze 1.6T		13	+5.901	2	8
7	30	(Sweden) Robert Dahlgren	Polestar Racing	Volvo C30		13	+12.352	8	6
8	5	(Hungary) Norbert Michelisz	Zengő-Dension Team	BMW 320 TC	Y	13	+16.721	16	4
9	4	(Russia) Aleksei Dudukalo	Lukoil-SUNRED	SEAT León 2.0 TDI	Y	13	+20.141	10	2
10	20	(Spain) **Javier Villa**	Proteam Racing	BMW 320 TC	Y	13	+28.827	14	1
11	25	(Morocco) Mehdi Bennani	Proteam Racing	BMW 320 TC	Y	13	+42.066	15	
12	12	(Germany) Franz Engstler	Liqui Moly Team Engstler	BMW 320 TC	Y	13	+48.235	17	
13	21	(Italy) Fabio Fabiani	Proteam Racing	BMW 320si	Y	12	+1 Lap	12	
14	74	(Spain) Pepe Oriola	SUNRED Engineering	SEAT León 2.0 TDI	Y	11	+2 Laps	7	
15	35	(Switzerland) Urs Sonderegger	Wiechers-Sport	BMW 320 TC	Y	9	+4 Laps	11	
Ret	1	(France) Yvan Muller	Chevrolet RML	Chevrolet Cruze 1.6T		7	Oil radiator	4	
Ret	11	(Denmark) Kristian Poulsen	Liqui Moly Team Engstler	BMW 320 TC	Y	0	Race incident	5	
DNS	15	(Netherlands) Tom Coronel	ROAL Motorsport	BMW 320 TC		0	Did not start	18	
DNS	7	(Switzerland) Fredy Barth	SEAT Swiss Racing by SUNRED	SEAT León 2.0 TDI	Y	0	Did not start	–	
DNS	65	(Hong Kong) Marchy Lee	DeTeam KK Motorsport	BMW 320 TC	Y	0	Did not start	19	
DSQ	10	(Japan) Yukinori Taniguchi	bamboo-engineering	Chevrolet Cruze 1.6T	Y	12	Disqualified	20	

- **Bold** denotes Fastest lap.

== Standings after the event ==
Drivers' Championship standings

	Pos	Driver	Points
	1	(United Kingdom) Robert Huff	70
	2	(Switzerland) Alain Menu	69
3	3	(Italy) Gabriele Tarquini	51
1	4	(France) Yvan Muller	48
3	5	(Portugal) Tiago Monteiro	31

Yokohama Independents' Trophy standings

	Pos	Driver	Points
	1	(Denmark) Kristian Poulsen	26
1	2	(Spain) Javier Villa	23
2	3	(Denmark) Michel Nykjær	23
3	4	(Hong Kong) Darryl O'Young	19
3	5	(Germany) Franz Engstler	19

Manufacturers' Championship standings

	Pos	Manufacturer	Points
	1	(United States) Chevrolet	156
1	2	(Spain) SR Customer Racing	107
1	3	(Germany) BMW Customer Racing Teams	85
	4	(Sweden) Volvo Polestar Evaluation Team	28

- Note: Only the top five positions are included for both sets of drivers' standings.
