= Urs Sonderegger =

Swiss racing driver

- Nationality: Swiss
- Born: April 28, 1964 (age 62) Glarus (Switzerland)

World Touring Car Championship career
- Debut season: 2011
- Current team: Wiechers-Sport
- Car number: 35
- Starts: 6
- Wins: 0
- Poles: 0
- Fastest laps: 0

Previous series
- 2008-10 2007-09 2007-09: SEAT León Eurocup; SEAT León Supercopa Spain; SEAT León Supercopa Germany

Urs "Ursinho" Sonderegger (born 28 April 1964 in Glarus) is a Swiss entrepreneur and racing driver. He currently competes in the World Touring Car Championship, driving a BMW 320 TC for the Wiechers-Sport team. Sonderegger runs an architecture and property firm called Atelier2000 Look GmbH.

== Racing career ==
Sonderegger began his racing career in 2006. In 2007, he began competing in the SEAT León Supercopa in both Germany and Spain. In 2008, he began competing in the SEAT León Eurocup.

In 2011, Sonderegger began racing in the World Touring Car Championship, driving a BMW 320 TC for the Wiechers-Sport team.

Sonderegger and the Wiechers team agreed to part company part way through the 2011 WTCC season.

== Racing record ==
=== Complete World Touring Car Championship results ===
(key) (Races in bold indicate pole position) (Races in italics indicate fastest lap)

Year	Team	Car	1	2	3	4	5	6	7	8	9	10	11	12	13	14	15	16	17	18	19	20	21	22	23	24	DC	Points
2011	Wiechers-Sport	BMW 320 TC	BRA; 1	BRA; 2	BEL; 1; 15	BEL; 2; 15	ITA; 1; 17	ITA; 2; 17	HUN; 1 DNS	HUN; 2 DNS	CZE; 1; 17	CZE; 2 Ret	POR; 1	POR; 2	GBR; 1	GBR; 2	GER; 1	GER; 2	ESP; 1	ESP; 2	JPN; 1	JPN; 2	CHN; 1	CHN; 2	MAC; 1	MAC; 2	**NC**	**0**
