= ADESS AD25 =

Portuguese sports car prototype

- Category: LMP3
- Constructor: ADESS
- Designer: Stéphane Chosse
- Predecessor: ADESS-03 Evo

Technical specifications
- Chassis: Carbon-honeycomb monocoque, Zylon "anti-intrusion" side panels
- Suspension (front): Double wishbones, pushrods with power steering and spring-dampers combination Five ways KW dampers Adjustable anti-roll bar system
- Suspension (rear): Same as front
- Length: 4,650 mm (183 in)
- Width: 1,890 mm (74 in)
- Wheelbase: 2,925 mm (115.2 in)
- Engine: Toyota V35A-FTS 3,445 cc (3.4 L; 210.2 cu in) 60° V6 twin-turbocharged
- Transmission: Xtrac P1152 6-speed sequential
- Power: 460 hp (466 PS; 343 kW)
- Weight: 970 kg (2,138.5 lb)
- Brakes: Brembo Six-piston callipers Ø 355 mm x 32 mm front and rear steel discs

Competition history
- Notable entrants: (United Kingdom) Nielsen Racing (Portugal) Purple Sector
- Notable drivers: (United Kingdom) Colin Noble (United Kingdom) Tom Fleming (Bulgaria) Pavel Lefterov (Bulgaria) Boris Yonchev

The ADESS AD25 is a Le Mans Prototype LMP3 race car designed, developed and built by Portuguese manufacturer ADESS to ACO 2025 3rd Generation Le Mans Prototype LMP3 regulations. The car is successor to the ADESS-03 Evo and can be built from its predecessor. It is eligible in the ACO's Le Mans Cup, European Le Mans Series and Asian Le Mans Series.

== Developmental history ==
On July 7, 2024, the Automobile Club de I'Ouest formally announced that 2025 would be the first year of the third generation Le Mans Prototype 3 (LMP3) cars using the previously announced, Oreca built, Toyota V35A V6 twin-turbocharged engines. All four previous constructors were retained for the new regulations. Upgrades to the car include a completely new cooling system, engine cover and new rear bodywork kit as a result of the new engine. New dampers from KW, were also added to improve performance.

Testing started in July 2024, at Estoril with TCR driver Quique Bordas, and continued at Barcelona and Portimão. Wayne Boyd also tested the car in September. Straight-line testing was conducted at Beja Airport with more track testing at Portimão and Estoril. Stéphane Chosse, the CEO of ADESS, reported that aero stability had improved throughout over 3,000 km (1,900 mi) of testing before homologation. In January 2025, ADESS inked a deal with Nielsen Racing and signed Colin Noble as its factory development and race driver.

Portuguese team Purple Sector entered the Prototype Cup Europe in 2026 with two AD25s.
