= Marc Carol =

Spanish auto racing driver

Marc Carol Ybarra (Note: In this Spanish name, the first or paternal surname is Carol and the second or maternal family name is Ybarra.) (born 14 February 1985) is a Spanish auto racing driver.

== Career ==
Carol competed in the Formula BMW Junior Cup Iberia in 2001, where he finished fourth. He also won the Spanish Citroën Saxo Cup that year. In 2002, he finished fifth in the Spanish Formula Junior 1600 series.

Carol won the Spanish SEAT León Supercopa in 2004, and he was rewarded with a one-off drive for SEAT Sport in the 2005 World Touring Car Championship at the Race of Spain at Circuit Ricardo Tormo. He finished the first race tenth, and the second race in eighth, scoring one championship point.

Carol returned to the Supercopa in 2007, finishing thirteenth. He also competed in the Spanish GT Championship in 2007 and 2008. Carol also won the Spanish Endurance Championship in 2008. He then won the Spanish SEAT León Supercopa again in 2009 and 2010.

== Racing record ==
=== Complete World Touring Car Championship results ===
(key) (Races in bold indicate pole position) (Races in italics indicate fastest lap)

Year	Team	Car	1	2	3	4	5	6	7	8	9	10	11	12	13	14	15	16	17	18	19	20	21	22	DC	Points
2005	SEAT Sport	SEAT Toledo Cupra	ITA; 1	ITA; 2	FRA; 1	FRA; 2	GBR; 1	GBR; 2	SMR; 1	SMR; 2	MEX; 1	MEX; 2	BEL; 1	BEL; 2	GER; 1	GER; 2	TUR; 1	TUR; 2	ESP; 1; 10	ESP; 2; 8	MAC; 1	MAC; 2			23rd	1
2010	SEAT Customers Technology	SEAT León 2.0 TFSI	BRA; 1	BRA; 2	MAR; 1	MAR; 2	ITA; 1	ITA; 2	BEL; 1	BEL; 2	POR; 1	POR; 2	GBR; 1	GBR; 2	CZE; 1	CZE; 2	GER; 1	GER; 2	ESP; 1; 13	ESP; 2; 13	JPN; 1	JPN; 2	MAC; 1	MAC; 2	NC	0

=== Complete Le Mans Cup results ===
(key) (Races in bold indicate pole position; results in italics indicate fastest lap)

Year	Entrant	Class	Chassis	1	2	3	4	5	6	7	Rank	Points
2024	Biogas Motorsport	GT3	Ferrari 296 GT3	CAT; WD	LEC; 10	LMS; 1; 17	LMS; 2; 17	SPA; 8	MUG; DSQ	ALG; 9	19th	9
2025	Biogas Motorsport	GT3	Ferrari 296 GT3	CAT; 4	LEC; 7	LMS; 1; 8	LMS; 2 Ret	SPA; 4	SIL; 3	ALG; Ret	7th	51
2026	Biogas Motorsport	GT3	Ferrari 296 GT3	BAR; Ret	LEC; 9	LMS	SPA; 8	SIL; 8	POR; 7		14th	16

^{*} Season still in progress.
