= ADESS =

German racecar constructor (company)

- Type: AG
- Industry: Automotive
- Founded: 2012
- Founder: Stéphane Chosse
- Headquarters: Munich, Germany; Vialonga, Portugal
- Website: ADESS AG

ADESS AG (Advanced Design and Engineering Systems Solutions) is a German racecar constructor based in Munich, Germany, with additional headquarters in Vialonga, Portugal since 2017. It was founded in 2012 by French engineer Stéphane Chosse.

== History ==
=== Sportscar racing ===
Upon completing his engineering study, Stéphane Chosse started at Équipe Ligier in 1996. After Ligier, Choice worked for Sauber and Toyota F1. After Toyota's departure from Formula 1, Chosse founded his own engineering bureau, which became ADESS AG in May 2012. The Lotus T128 LMP2 was designed and manufactured by ADESS in conjunction with Kodewa. The car was entered in the 2013 24 Hours of Le Mans and the 2013 FIA World Endurance Championship season. The cars had no success in the 24 Hours of Le Mans, both cars failed to finish the race. Before the race at Le Mans, Kodewa (whom entered the Lotus) and ADESS (whom manufactured the Lotus) were in a legal debate. ADESS seized the cars after Kodewa failed to pay invoices. On the other hand, Kodewa issued a statement in which they claimed that ADESS was in debt to them. The same day ADESS issued a statement in which the company denied the accusations made by Kodewa.

ADESS started to develop a chassis according to 2014 LMP1 regulations. ADESS was contracted to build the monocoque for the Nissan Zeod RC. The LMP1 project was officially put on hold on September 13, 2013. Two days before, on September 11, ADESS unveiled their first LMP2 racer. The ADESS-02 LMP2 Coupé was designed to compete in the 2014 24 Hours of Le Mans. It will not be fielded by ADESS, instead it is a customer car designed to accept a wide range of engines to power it.

=== Formula 1 ===
ADESS performed aerodynamic development work for the HRT F1 team in 2012, the firm was responsible for the aerodynamics of the HRT F112. ADESS designed the whole bodywork of the car. The development of the 2013 HRT F1 car was already underway when the team went into liquidation, this ended the relationship between HRT and ADESS. Without the intent to consider a Formula 1 entry, ADESS did a preliminary study into the 2014 Formula 1 rules. It is not clear for whom the car was developed.

== List of cars ==
Year	Car	Class	Picture	Notes
2013	Lotus T128 LMP2	LMP2	The Lotus T128 LMP2 manufactured by ADESS AG.	
2013	HRT F112	Formula 1	Pedro de la Rosa driving the HRT F112	Aerodynamic development only
2014	ADESS-02	LMP2		Never raced
2014	Nissan ZEOD RC	Garage 56	Nissan ZEOD RC at the Geneva Motor Show	Monocoque development only
2015	ADESS-03	LMP3		
2016	Forze VII	prototype		ADESS-03 based
2018	Pininfarina H2 Speed	Concept car		ADESS-03 based
2018	Forze VIII	prototype		ADESS-03 based
2019	GreenGT LMPH2G	LMP3		ADESS-03 based
2020	ADESS-03 EVO	LMP3		
2020	H24	prototype		ADESS-03 based
2022	Forze IX	prototype		ADESS-03 based
2025	ADESS AD25	LMP3		
