= SEAT León Supercopa =

One-make racing series

The SEAT León Supercopa was a one-make racing series, organised by SEAT Sport, the motorsport division of Spanish car manufacturer SEAT. It used a modified version of the SEAT León road car, and championships have been run in Spain, Germany, Italy, France, the United Kingdom, Turkey and Hungary.

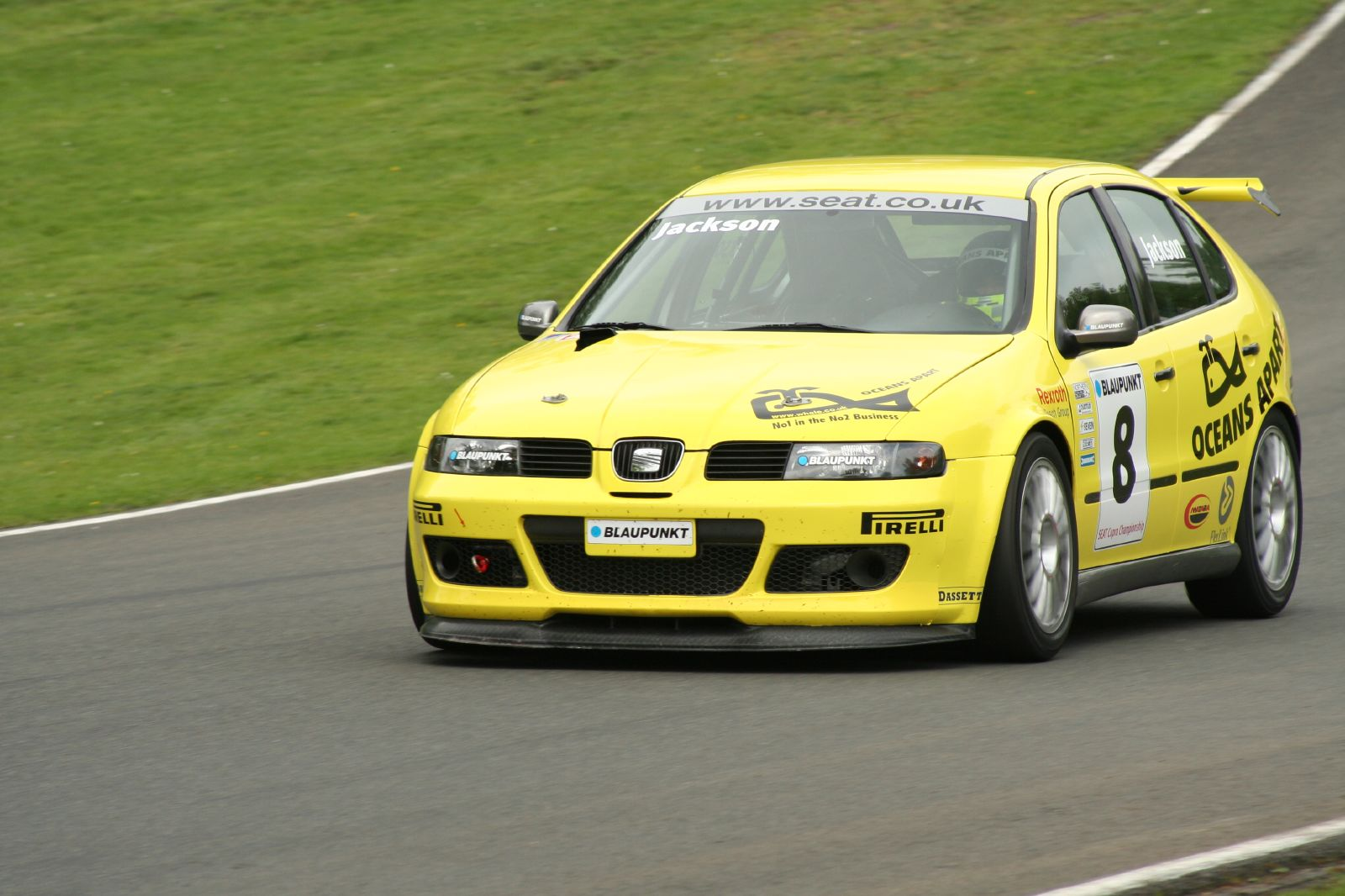
The original Mk1 Cupra R model.

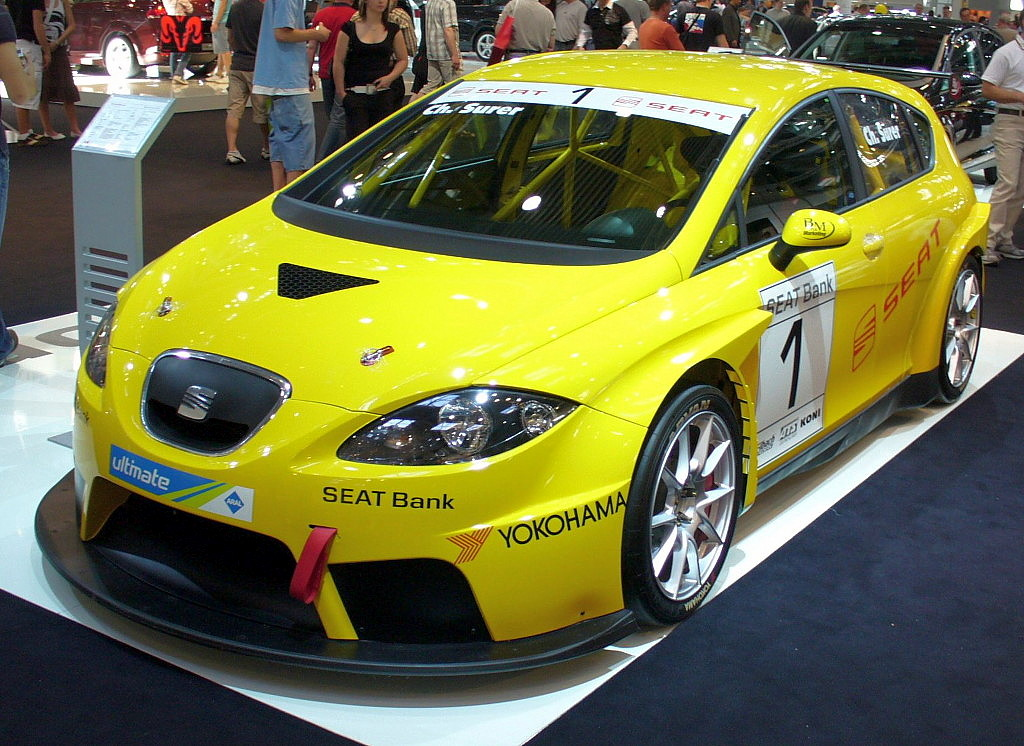
The Mk2 SEAT León Supercopa car.

== Car ==
The Supercopa originally used a car based on the Mk1 León Cupra 4 model, using the 4wd platform but running front wheel drive. This then made the rear have independent suspension thus better handling This was replaced for 2006 in Spain and Germany and 2007 in Britain by the Mk2 model.

== Championships ==
=== Eurocup ===
The SEAT León Eurocup was first held from 2008 to 2010, supporting the World Touring Car Championship. It was revived in 2014, in this case supporting the International GT Open.

=== United Kingdom ===
SEAT introduced the championship to the UK in 2003 under the name SEAT Cupra Championship, as a support series for the British Touring Car Championship, which SEAT Sport UK would go on to enter in 2004. The series was very popular and produced future touring car winners such as Rob Huff, Gordon Shedden and Mat Jackson. The series was ended at the end of 2008 due to SEAT UK's withdrawal from motorsport activities. Plans for an independent Supercopa Challenge to be held in the UK in 2009 were scrapped due to a lack of entries.

=== Spain ===
The Supercopa was started by SEAT Sport in Spain in 2002, ahead of the brand's move into the European Touring Car Championship for 2003. Oscar Nouges and Marc Carol have won the most championships in the series, both have driven in WTCC SUNREDs as well as the 2007 champion José Manuel Pérez-Aicart driving in WTCC.

=== Germany ===
The German series began in 2004 and was held until 2011. Sebastian Stahl won the first edition, beating Peter Terting, who went on to race in the World Touring Car Championship for SEAT the following year. Nicki Thiim won in 2008 and later became a Porsche factory driver.

=== Italy ===
The Trofeo León Supercopa began in 2008 as part of the Campionato Italiano Turismo Endurance series, and is run by SEAT Motorsport Italia.

=== France ===
The French Supercopa was run from 2010 to 2012, organised by Oreca as part of the GT Tour, supporting the FFSA GT Championship.

=== Hungary ===
The Hungarian Seat Leon Supercopa started in 2007.

== Champions ==
Year	Europe	France	Germany	Italy	Spain	(United Kingdom) UK	Mexico	Hungary
2002					(Andorra) Joan Vinyes			
2003					(Spain) Luis Miguel Reyes	(United Kingdom) Robert Huff		
2004			(Germany) Sebastian Stahl		(Spain) Marc Carol	(United Kingdom) James Pickford		
2005			(Germany) Thomas Marschall		(Spain) Oscar Nogués	(United Kingdom) Tom Boardman		
2006			(Germany) Florian Gruber		(Spain) Oscar Nogués	(United Kingdom) Mat Jackson		
2007			(Germany) Thomas Marschall		(Spain) José Manuel Pérez-Aicart	(United Kingdom) Jonathan Adam		(Hungary) Norbert Kiss
2008	(Spain) Oscar Nogués		(Denmark) Nicki Thiim	(Italy) Roberto Russo	(United Kingdom) Tom Boardman	(United Kingdom) Jonathan Adam		(Hungary) Norbert Kiss
2009	(Hungary) Norbert Michelisz		(Germany) Thomas Marschall	(Italy) Luca Trevisol (Italy) Matteo Zucchi	(Spain) Marc Carol			(Hungary) Norbert Michelisz
2010	(Hungary) Gábor Wéber	(France) Julien Briché	(Sweden) Andreas Simonsen	(Italy) Simone Iacone	(Spain) Marc Carol			(Hungary) Miklos Kazar
2011		(France) Gaël Castelli	(Germany) Elia Erhart				(Mexico) Ricardo Pérez de Lara	(Hungary) Norbert Kiss
2012		(Switzerland) Jimmy Antunes					(Mexico) Ricardo Pérez de Lara	(Hungary) Norbert Nagy
2013							(Mexico) Ricardo Pérez de Lara	
2014	(Spain) Pol Rosell							
2015	(Spain) Pol Rosell							
