= 2025 IMSA VP Racing SportsCar Challenge =

Motor racing competition

The 2025 IMSA VP Racing SportsCar Challenge season was the third season of the IMSA VP Racing SportsCar Challenge after being established in 2023 as a replacement for the IMSA Prototype Challenge. The season began on January 20 at Daytona International Speedway and finished on October 10 at Road Atlanta. After IMSA's removal of the LMP3 class from the 2024 IMSA SportsCar Championship, this series is now the highest tier of racing for LMP3s in the United States. On August 29, 2024, it was announced that GT3 cars (GTDX) will be added alongside the existing two classes.

== Classes ==
- Le Mans Prototype 3 (LMP3)
- GT Daytona X (GTDX)
- Grand Sport X (GSX)

== Calendar ==
The provisional schedule was released on August 29, 2024, at IMSA's annual State of the Sport Address, featuring twelve rounds split across six race weekends. All six events had confirmed dates.

Round	Circuit	Date
1	(United States) Daytona International Speedway, Daytona Beach, Florida	January 17–19
2	(United States) Circuit of the Americas, Austin, Texas	February 28 – March 1
3	(United States) Mid-Ohio Sports Car Course, Lexington, Ohio	June 6–8
4	(Canada) Canadian Tire Motorsport Park, Bowmanville, Ontario	July 11–13
5	(United States) Virginia International Raceway, Alton, Virginia	August 22–24
6	(United States) Michelin Raceway Road Atlanta, Braselton, Georgia, Georgia	October 8–10

== Entry list ==
All cars in the LMP3 class use the Nissan VK56DE 5.6L V8 engine.

=== LMP3 ===
Team	Car	No.	Drivers	Rounds
(Germany) Gebhardt Motorsport	Duqueine M30 - D08	1	(Sweden) Alexzander Kristiansson	6
(Germany) Gebhardt Motorsport	Duqueine M30 - D08	30	(Germany) Valentino Catalano	All
(Germany) Gebhardt Motorsport	Duqueine M30 - D08	31	(Germany) Markus Pommer	1
(Germany) Gebhardt Motorsport	Duqueine M30 - D08	31	(Colombia) Óscar Tunjo	2–4, 6
(Germany) Gebhardt Motorsport	Duqueine M30 - D08	31	(Sweden) Alexzander Kristiansson	5
(United States) RAFA Racing Team	Ligier JS P320	36	(United States) Matthew Dicken	1–2, 4–6
(United States) RAFA Racing Team	Ligier JS P320	36	(United States) Corey Lewis	3
(United States) MLT Motorsports	Ligier JS P320	54	(Canada) Jonathan Woolridge	1–2, 4
(Germany) Mishumotors	Ligier JS P320	70	(Germany) Mirco Schultis	1–2
(United States) Forte Racing	Ligier JS P320	77	(United States) Brian Thienes	All
(United States) Forte Racing	Ligier JS P320	86	(United States) Jon Hirshberg	1, 5–6
(United States) Toney Driver Development	Ligier JS P320	80	(United States) Brady Golan	1
(United States) Toney Driver Development	Ligier JS P320	80	(Brazil) Lucas Fecury	6
(United States) FastMD Racing with Remstar	Duqueine M30 - D08	87	(United States) Farhan Siddiqi	6

=== GTDX ===
Team	Car	Engine	No.	Drivers	Rounds
(United States) Turner Motorsport	BMW M4 GT3	BMW S58B30T0 3.0 L Turbo I6	6	(United States) Jake Walker	All
(United States) Turner Motorsport	BMW M4 GT3	BMW S58B30T0 3.0 L Turbo I6	95	(United States) Vin Barletta	1–5
(United States) Lone Star Racing	Mercedes-AMG GT3 Evo	Mercedes-Benz M159 6.2 L V8	11	(United States) Marc Austin	2
(United States) Conquest Racing	Ferrari 296 GT3	Ferrari F163CE 3.0 L Turbo V6	20	(United States) Dave Musial Jr.	1–2
(United States) Conquest Racing	Ferrari 296 GT3	Ferrari F163CE 3.0 L Turbo V6	99	(United States) Dave Musial	1–2
(United States) Wright Motorsports	Porsche 911 GT3 R (992)	Porsche M97/80 4.2 L Flat-6	24	(United States) Adam Adelson	All
(United States) GMG Racing	Porsche 911 GT3 R (992)	Porsche M97/80 4.2 L Flat-6	32	(United States) Kyle Washington	1–2, 6
(Canada) ST Racing	BMW M4 GT3	BMW S58B30T0 3.0 L Turbo I6	38	(Canada) Samantha Tan	All
(Italy) AF Corse	Ferrari 296 GT3	Ferrari F163CE 3.0 L Turbo V6	50	(Argentina) Matias Perez Companc	1–2
(Italy) AF Corse	Ferrari 296 GT3	Ferrari F163CE 3.0 L Turbo V6	50	(United States) Rodin Younessi	3
(Italy) AF Corse	Ferrari 296 GT3	Ferrari F163CE 3.0 L Turbo V6	66	(United States) AJ Muss	1–4

=== GSX ===
Team	Car	Engine	No.	Drivers	Rounds
(United States) Automatic Racing	Aston Martin Vantage AMR GT4	Aston Martin M177 4.0 L Twin-Turbo V8	09	(United States) Matthew Siegal	1
(United States) Czabok-Simpson Motorsport	Porsche 718 Cayman GT4 RS Clubsport	Porsche MDG 4.0 L Flat-6	2	(United States) Jackson Lee	1
(United States) FastMD Racing with Remstar Racing	Audi R8 LMS GT4 Evo	Audi DAR 5.2 L V10	3	(United States) Farhan Siddiqi	1
(Canada) Di Benedetto Racing	Porsche 718 Cayman GT4 RS Clubsport	Porsche MDG 4.0 L Flat-6	4	(Canada) Justin Di Benedetto	All
(United States) KMW Motorsports with TMR Engineering	Porsche 718 Cayman GT4 RS Clubsport	Porsche MDG 4.0 L Flat-6	5	(United States) Angus Rogers	All
(United States) RAFA Racing Team	Toyota GR Supra GT4 Evo2	BMW B58B30 3.0 L Twin-Turbo I6	8	(Brazil) Kiko Porto	All
(United States) RAFA Racing Team	Toyota GR Supra GT4 Evo2	BMW B58B30 3.0 L Twin-Turbo I6	68	(United States) Ian Porter	All
(United States) Carrus Callas Raceteam	BMW M4 GT4 Evo (G82)	BMW S58B30T0 3.0 L Twin Turbo I6	10	(United States) Chris Walsh	1–2
(United States) Swish Motorsports	BMW M4 GT4 (G82)	BMW S58B30T0 3.0 L Twin Turbo I6	12	(United States) Patrick Wilmot	1–2
(United States) AR Motorsports	Porsche 718 Cayman GT4 RS Clubsport	Porsche MDG 4.0 L Flat-6	14	(United States) David Hampton	3–5
(United States) Auto Technic Racing	BMW M4 GT4 Evo (G82)	BMW S58B30T0 3.0 L Twin Turbo I6	19	(Austria) Roland Krainz	All
(United States) Thunder Bunny Racing	BMW M4 GT4 Evo (G82)	BMW S58B30T0 3.0 L Twin Turbo I6	21	(United States) Allen Patten	6
(Canada) TWOth Autosport	Porsche 718 Cayman GT4 RS Clubsport	Porsche MDG 4.0 L Flat-6	22	(United States) Chris Walsh	3–5
(United States) Stephen Cameron Racing	Ford Mustang GT4	Ford Coyote 5.0 L V8	43	(United States) Gregory Liefooghe	1
(United States) Kingpin Racing	BMW M4 GT4 Evo (G82)	BMW S58B30T0 3.0 L Twin Turbo I6	34	(United States) Tiger Tari	6
(United States) Kingpin Racing	Toyota GR Supra GT4 Evo2	BMW B58B30 3.0 L Twin-Turbo I6	53	(United States) Rob Walker	1, 3
(United States) Rebel Rock Racing	Aston Martin Vantage AMR GT4 Evo	Aston Martin M177 4.0 L Turbo V8	72	(United States) Frank DePew	All
(United States) BSI Racing	Toyota GR Supra GT4 Evo2	BMW B58B30 3.0 L Twin-Turbo I6	76	(United States) Steven Clemons	All
(United States) 89x	Aston Martin Vantage AMR GT4	Aston Martin M177 4.0 L Turbo V8	89	(United States) Christopher Tasca	1
(United States) 89x	Aston Martin Vantage AMR GT4	Aston Martin M177 4.0 L Turbo V8	89	(United States) Mike Fitzpatrick	5
(United States) 89x	Aston Martin Vantage AMR GT4	Aston Martin M177 4.0 L Turbo V8	89	(United States) Eric Zitza	6
(United States) CarBahn with Peregrine Racing	BMW M4 GT4 (G82)	BMW S58B30T0 3.0 L Twin Turbo I6	93	(United States) Bill Cain	5–6
(United States) Turner Motorsport	BMW M4 GT4 (G82)	BMW S58B30T0 3.0 L Twin Turbo I6	96	(United States) Matt Dalton	1, 3

== Race results ==
Bold indicates overall winner.

Round		Circuit	P3 Winner	GTDX Winner	GSX Winner
1	R1	(United States) Daytona	**(Germany) #30 Gebhardt Motorsport**	(United States) #24 Wright Motorsports	(United States) #8 RAFA Racing
1	R1	(United States) Daytona	(Germany) **Valentino Catalano**	(United States) Adam Adelson	(Brazil) Kiko Porto
1	R2	(United States) Daytona	**(Germany) #30 Gebhardt Motorsport**	(United States) #24 Wright Motorsports	(United States) #8 RAFA Racing
1	R2	(United States) Daytona	(Germany) **Valentino Catalano**	(United States) Adam Adelson	(Brazil) Kiko Porto
2	R1	(United States) COTA	**(United States) #54 MLT Motorsports**	(United States) #6 Turner Motorsport	(United States) #8 RAFA Racing
2	R1	(United States) COTA	**(Canada) Jonathan Woolridge**	(United States) Jake Walker	(Brazil) Kiko Porto
2	R2	(United States) COTA	**(Germany) #30 Gebhardt Motorsport**	(United States) #6 Turner Motorsport	(United States) #68 RAFA Racing
2	R2	(United States) COTA	(Germany) **Valentino Catalano**	(United States) Jake Walker	(United States) Ian Porter
3	R1	(United States) Mid-Ohio	**(United States) #36 RAFA Racing**	(United States) #6 Turner Motorsport	(United States) #76 BSI Racing
3	R1	(United States) Mid-Ohio	**(United States) Corey Lewis**	(United States) Jake Walker	(United States) Steven Clemons
3	R2	(United States) Mid-Ohio	**(Germany) #31 Gebhardt Motorsport**	(United States) #24 Wright Motorsports	(United States) #8 RAFA Racing
3	R2	(United States) Mid-Ohio	**(Colombia) Óscar Tunjo**	(United States) Adam Adelson	(Brazil) Kiko Porto
4	R1	(Canada) Mosport	**(Germany) #30 Gebhardt Motorsport**	(United States) #6 Turner Motorsport	(United States) #8 RAFA Racing
4	R1	(Canada) Mosport	(Germany) **Valentino Catalano**	(United States) Jake Walker	(Brazil) Kiko Porto
4	R2	(Canada) Mosport	Postponed - weather; Made-up at the following round in Virginia		
5	R1	(United States) Virginia	**(Germany) #30 Gebhardt Motorsport**	(United States) #6 Turner Motorsport	(United States) #76 BSI Racing
5	R1	(United States) Virginia	(Germany) **Valentino Catalano**	(United States) Jake Walker	(United States) Steven Clemons
5	R2	(United States) Virginia	**(Germany) #30 Gebhardt Motorsport**	(United States) #6 Turner Motorsport	(United States) #8 RAFA Racing
5	R2	(United States) Virginia	(Germany) **Valentino Catalano**	(United States) Jake Walker	(Brazil) Kiko Porto
5	R3	(United States) Virginia	**(Germany) #30 Gebhardt Motorsport**	(United States) #6 Turner Motorsport	(United States) #8 RAFA Racing
5	R3	(United States) Virginia	(Germany) **Valentino Catalano**	(United States) Jake Walker	(Brazil) Kiko Porto
6	R1	(United States) Road Atlanta	**(Germany) #31 Gebhardt Motorsport**	(United States) #6 Turner Motorsport	(United States) #8 RAFA Racing
6	R1	(United States) Road Atlanta	**(Colombia) Óscar Tunjo**	(United States) Jake Walker	(Brazil) Kiko Porto
6	R2	(United States) Road Atlanta	**(Germany) #30 Gebhardt Motorsport**	(United States) #6 Turner Motorsport	(United States) #8 RAFA Racing
6	R2	(United States) Road Atlanta	(Germany) **Valentino Catalano**	(United States) Jake Walker	(Brazil) Kiko Porto

== Championship standings ==
=== Points system ===
Championship points are awarded in each class at the finish of each event. Points are awarded based on finishing positions in the race as shown in the chart below.

Position	1	2	3	4	5	6	7	8	9	10	11	12	13	14	15	16	17	18	19	20	21	22	23	24	25	26	27	28	29	30+
Race	350	320	300	280	260	250	240	230	220	210	200	190	180	170	160	150	140	130	120	110	100	90	80	70	60	50	40	30	20	10

=== Drivers' Championships ===
==== LMP3 Drivers' Championship ====
Pos.	Drivers	DAY (United States)		AUS (United States)		MOH (United States)		MOS (Canada)		VIR (United States)			ATL (United States)		Points
1	(Germany) Valentino Catalano	**1**	**1**	5	**1**	**4**	**2**	1	C	**1**	**1**	**1**	2	1	3980
2	(United States) Brian Thienes	5	4	2	4	3	4	3	C	3	3	2	4	3	3520
3	(United States) Matthew Dicken	8	6	4	5			4	C	5	5	3	8	8	2580
4	(Colombia) Óscar Tunjo			**6**	2	2	1	**5**	**C**				**1**	**5**	2110
5	(United States) Jon Hirshberg	7	5							4	4	4	5	7	1560
6	(Canada) Jonathan Woolridge	6	3	1	3			2	C						1520
7	(Sweden) Alexzander Kristiansson									2	2	5	7	4	1160
8	(Germany) Mirco Schultis	4	8	3	DNS										810
9	(United States) Corey Lewis					1	3								650
10	(Germany) Markus Pommer	3	2												620
11	(Brazil) Lucas Fecury												3	2	620
12	(United States) Brady Golan	2	7												560
13	(United States) Farhan Siddiqi												6	6	500

Colour	Result
Gold	Winner
Silver	Second place
Bronze	Third place
Green	Points classification
Blue	Non-points classification
Blue	Non-classified finish (NC)
Purple	Retired, not classified (Ret)
Red	Did not qualify (DNQ)
Red	Did not pre-qualify (DNPQ)
Black	Disqualified (DSQ)
White	Did not start (DNS)
White	Withdrew (WD)
White	Race cancelled (C)
Blank	Did not practice (DNP)
Blank	Did not arrive (DNA)
Blank	Excluded (EX)

**Bold** - Pole position
Italics - Fastest lap

==== GTDX Drivers' Championship ====
Pos.	Drivers	DAY (United States)		AUS (United States)		MOH (United States)		MOS (Canada)		VIR (United States)			ATL (United States)		Points
1	(United States) Adam Adelson	**1**	**1**	3	6	3	1	2	C	2	2	2	2	2	3820
2	(United States) Jake Walker	DNS	9	**1**	**1**	**1**	**3**	**1**	**C**	**1**	**1**	**1**	**1**	**1**	3670
3	(Canada) Samantha Tan	5	5	5	4	5	4	4	C	3	4	3	3	3	3360
4	(United States) Vin Barletta	6	6	8	7	4	5	5	C	4	3	4			2630
5	(United States) AJ Muss	2	3	2	2	2	2	3	C						2200
6	(United States) Kyle Washington	7	4	7	5								4	4	1580
7	(Argentina) Matias Perez Companc	3	2	4	3										1200
8	(United States) Dave Musial	4	8	9	DNS										730
9	(United States) Dave Musial Jr.	8	7	10	DNS										680
10	(United States) Marc Austin			6	8										480

==== GSX Drivers' Championship ====
Pos.	Drivers	DAY (United States)		AUS (United States)		MOH (United States)		MOS (Canada)		VIR (United States)			ATL (United States)		Points
1	(Brazil) Kiko Porto	**1**	**1**	**1**	**9**	**2**	**1**	**1**	**C**	**2**	**1**	**1**	**1**	**1**	4010
2	(United States) Ian Porter	14	3	3	1	3	5	8	C	3	3	2	5	2	3410
3	(United States) Steven Clemons	11	15	2	3	1	3	2	C	1	2	5	7	10	3330
4	(Canada) Justin Di Benedetto	4	4	5	6	5	4	4	C	5	5	3	6	3	3260
5	(United States) Angus Rogers	7	6	6	7	7	8	6	C	9	10	8†	4	6	2890
6	(Austria) Roland Krainz	9	11	9	5	10	9	9	C	10	9	4	10	9	2690
7	(United States) Frank DePew	15	10	7	8	11	10	5	C	7	6	6	11†	8	2680
8	(United States) Chris Walsh	10	9	8	2	4	2	3	C	6	4	7			2650
9	(United States) Patrick Wilmot	3	7	4	4										1100
10	(United States) Rob Walker	5	8			9	7								950
11	(United States) Bill Cain									8	7		8	7	940
12	(United States) Matt Dalton	16	12			6	6								840
13	(United States) David Hampton					8	DNS	7	C	11	DNS	DNS			670
14	(United States) Allen Patten												2	4	600
15	(United States) Gregory Liefooghe	2	5												580
16	(United States) Jackson Lee	6	2												570
17	(United States) Jon Brel												3	5	560
18	(United States) Tyler Hoffman									4	8				510
19	(United States) Matthew Siegal	8	13												410
20	(United States) Mike Fitzpatrick									12	11				290
21	(United States) Farhan Siddiqi	13	14												350
22	(United States) Christopher Tasca	12	16												340
23	(United States) Eric Zitza												9	DNS	220

- †: Post-event penalty. Car moved to back of class.

=== Teams' Championships ===
==== LMP3 Teams' Championship ====
Pos.	Team	DAY (United States)		AUS (United States)		MOH (United States)		MOS (Canada)		VIR (United States)			ATL (United States)		Points
1	(Germany) #30 Gebhardt Motorsport	**1**	**1**	5	**1**	**4**	**2**	1	C	**1**	**1**	**1**	2	1	3980
2	(United States) #77 Forte Racing	5	4	2	4	3	4	3	C	3	3	2	4	3	3520
3	(Germany) #31 Gebhardt Motorsport	3	2	**6**	2	2	1	**5**	**C**	2	2		**1**	**5**	3370
4	(United States) #36 RAFA Racing Team	8	6	4	5	1	3	4	C	5	5	3	8	8	3230
5	(United States) #86 Forte Racing	7	5							4	4		5	7	1560
6	(United States) #54 MLT Motorsports	6	3	1	3			2	C						1520
7	(United States) #80 Toney Driver Development	2	7										3	2	1180
8	(Germany) #70 Mishumotors	4	8	3	DNS										810
9	(Germany) #1 Gebhardt Motorsport												7	4	520
10	(United States) #87 FastMD Racing with Remstar												6	6	500

Colour	Result
Gold	Winner
Silver	Second place
Bronze	Third place
Green	Points classification
Blue	Non-points classification
Blue	Non-classified finish (NC)
Purple	Retired, not classified (Ret)
Red	Did not qualify (DNQ)
Red	Did not pre-qualify (DNPQ)
Black	Disqualified (DSQ)
White	Did not start (DNS)
White	Withdrew (WD)
White	Race cancelled (C)
Blank	Did not practice (DNP)
Blank	Did not arrive (DNA)
Blank	Excluded (EX)

**Bold** - Pole position
Italics - Fastest lap

==== GTDX Teams' Championship ====
Pos.	Team	DAY (United States)		AUS (United States)		MOH (United States)		MOS (Canada)		VIR (United States)			ATL (United States)		Points
1	(United States) #24 Wright Motorsports	**1**	**1**	3	6	3	1	2	C	2	2	2	2	2	3820
2	(United States) #6 Turner Motorsport	DNS	9	**1**	**1**	**1**	**3**	**1**	**C**	**1**	**1**	**1**	**1**	**1**	3670
3	(Canada) #38 ST Racing	5	5	5	4	5	4	4	C	3	4	3	3	3	3360
4	(United States) #95 Turner Motorsport	6	6	8	7	4	5	5	C	4	3	4			2630
5	(Italy) #66 AF Corse	2	3	2	2	2	2	3	C						2200
6	(United States) #32 GMG Racing	7	4	7	5								4	4	1580
7	(Italy) #50 AF Corse	3	2	4	3	6	DNS								1450
8	(United States) #99 Conquest Racing	4	8	9	DNS										730
9	(United States) #20 Conquest Racing	8	7	10	DNS										680
10	(United States) #11 Lone Star Racing			6	8										480

==== GSX Teams' Championship ====
Pos.	Team	DAY (United States)		AUS (United States)		MOH (United States)		MOS (Canada)		VIR (United States)	ATL (United States)	Points
1	(United States) #8 RAFA Racing Team	**1**	**1**	**1**	**9**	**2**	**1**	**1**	**C**			2290
2	(United States) #76 BSI Racing	11	15	2	3	1	3	2	C			1950
3	(United States) #68 RAFA Racing Team	14	3	3	1	3	5	8	C			1910
4	(Canada) #4 Di Benedetto Racing	4	4	5	6	5	4	4	C			1890
5	(United States) #5 KMW Motorsports with TMR Engineering	7	6	6	7	7	8	6	C			1700
6	(United States) #19 Auto Technic Racing	9	11	9	5	10	9	9	C			1550
7	(United States) #72 Rebel Rock Racing	15	10	7	8	11	10	5	C			1510
8	(United States) #12 Swish Motorsports	3	7	4	4							1100
9	(United States) #10 Carrus Callas Raceteam	10	9	8	2							980
10	(United States) #53 Kingpin Racing	5	8			9	7					950
11	(United States) #22 TWOth Autosport					4	2	3	C			900
12	(United States) #96 Turner Motorsport	16	12			6	6					840
13	(United States) #43 Stephen Cameron Racing	2	5									580
14	(United States) #2 Czabok-Simpson Motorsport	6	2									570
15	(United States) #14 AR Motorsports					8	DNS	7	C			470
16	(United States) #09 Automatic Racing	8	13									410
17	(United States) #3 FastMD Racing with Remstar Racing	13	14									350
18	(United States) #89 89x	12	16									340
