= Esteban Masson =

French racing driver (born 2004)

- Masson at Silverstone Circuit in 2026
- Nationality: (France) French
- Born: Esteban Alexandre Heinrich Masson; 18 September 2004 (age 22) Montreal, Quebec, Canada

ELMS and WEC career
- Current team: Forestier Racing by Panis and Akkodis ASP Team
- Categorisation: FIA Silver (2023–2024); FIA Gold (2025–)
- Car number: 29 and 78

Previous series
- 2025 2024 2023–2024 2023 2022–2023 2019–2021: Super Formula Lights; European Le Mans Series; FIA World Endurance Championship; Eurocup-3; FR European Championship; French F4 Championship

Championship titles
- 2025 2023 2021: European Le Mans Series - LMP2; Eurocup-3; French F4 Championship

Awards
- 2025: LMP2 ELMS Champion

Esteban Alexandre Heinrich Masson (born 18 September 2004) is a French and Canadian racing driver competing in the European Le Mans Series for Forestier Racing by Panis in LMP2 and the FIA World Endurance Championship for Akkodis ASP Team in LMGT3. He is also the reserve driver for Toyota Racing in Hypercar. Masson won the 2025 European Le Mans Series for VDS Panis Racing, partnering Oliver Gray and Charles Milesi. In junior formulae, he was a French F4 and Eurocup-3 champion.

== Early career ==
=== Karting ===
Having been born in Canada, Masson discovered karting at the age of three. He started winning titles after moving to France, with regional and national championships in the categories mini-kart, Minimes and Cadets. In 2018, Masson took the National Series Karting title and followed it up the following year by winning the French Junior Championship. Masson continued karting in 2020, finishing fifth in the IAME Euro Series.

=== Formula 4 ===
==== 2019 ====
Masson made his single-seater debut in the final round of the 2019 French F4 Championship. He finished all three races at the Paul Ricard Circuit outside of the top-ten, with a best result of eleventh in race 3.

==== 2020 ====
The following year, Masson again raced solely in the last round of French F4 at Le Castellet. This time his results would improve, as he ended two races in points-paying positions. However, due to his status as a guest driver, Masson didn't receive any championship points.

==== 2021 ====
Masson joined the French F4 Championship on a full-time basis for the first time in 2021. He started his campaign out in brilliant fashion, winning the opening race at Nogaro and taking an early championship lead after three successive victories, two in Magny-Cours and one at the Hungaroring. However, two comparatively weak rounds at Lédenon and Monza threw Masson back behind his closest rival Macéo Capietto, who had scored four podiums from those rounds compared to Masson's one. The latter would get back to winning ways in the penultimate round in Le Castellet, and took another win in the first race of the final round in Nevers. The final race threw up controversy in the title fight: having taken pole position Masson remained in the lead of the race and the standings until the last lap, when Capietto, who was trying to make a last-gasp overtake for the lead, collided with Masson, putting him out of the race and provisionally handing Capietto the title. Following an investigation by the race stewards Capietto was disqualified from all results of that weekend, handing Masson the title.

=== Formula Regional ===
==== 2022 ====
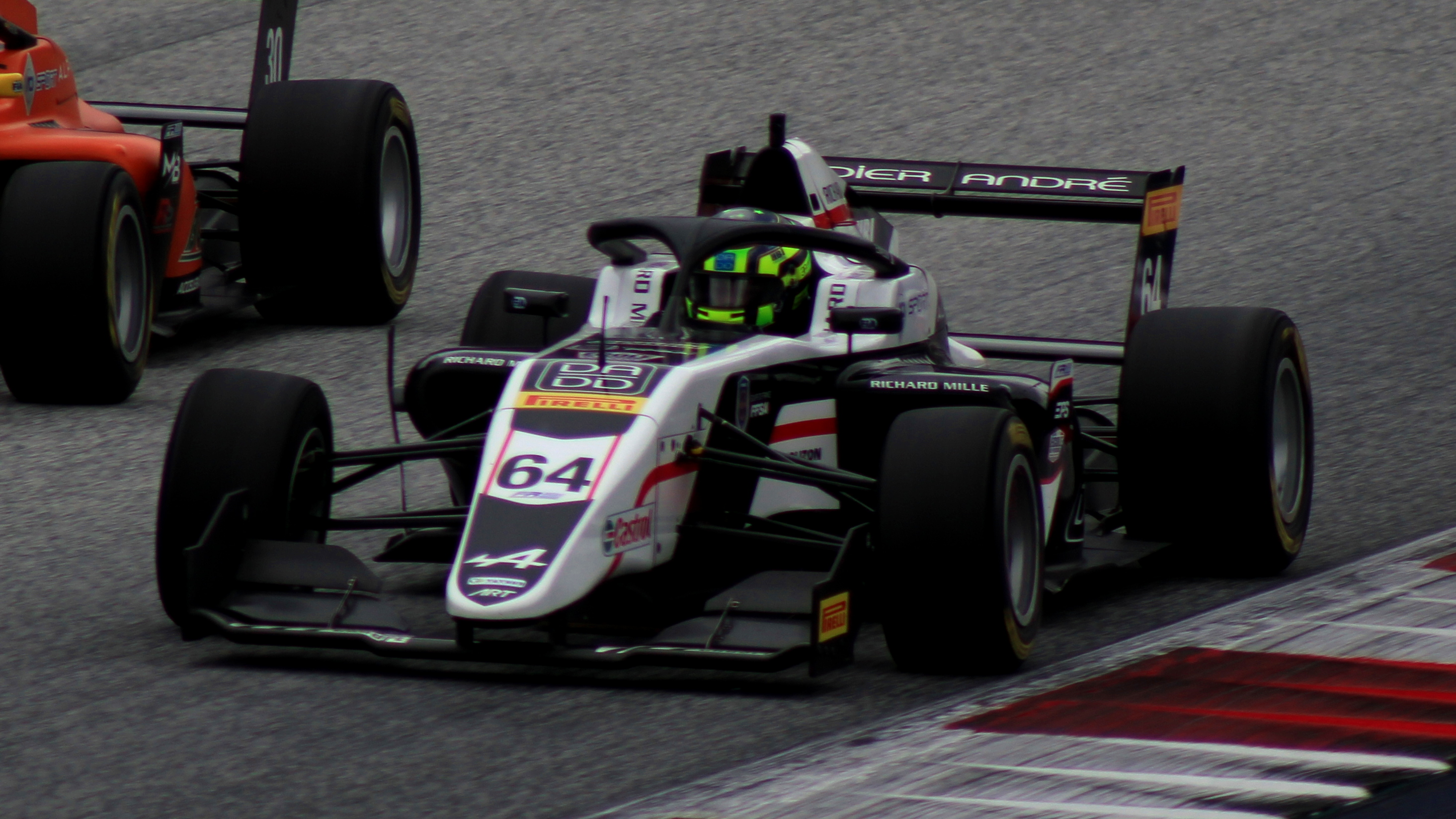
Masson racing in the 2022 Formula Regional European Championship at the Red Bull Ring

For the 2022 season, Masson progressed to the Formula Regional European Championship as one of the French Federation of Automobile Sport's five Équipe de France representatives. He joined two-time Formula One World Champion Fernando Alonso's team, FA Racing, alongside Victor Bernier and Nicolás Baptiste. At Zandvoort, Masson collided with Pietro Delli Guanti approaching turn two, sending the Italian into a roll. Fortunately however, both drivers exited the scene uninjured and neither were given a penalty by the race stewards.

Before the round at Spa-Francorchamps, it was announced that Masson would switch to ART Grand Prix, replacing Mari Boya. He would not score any points with the French outfit and finished 24th in the standings, with his only point being scored at the Hungaroring.

==== 2023 ====
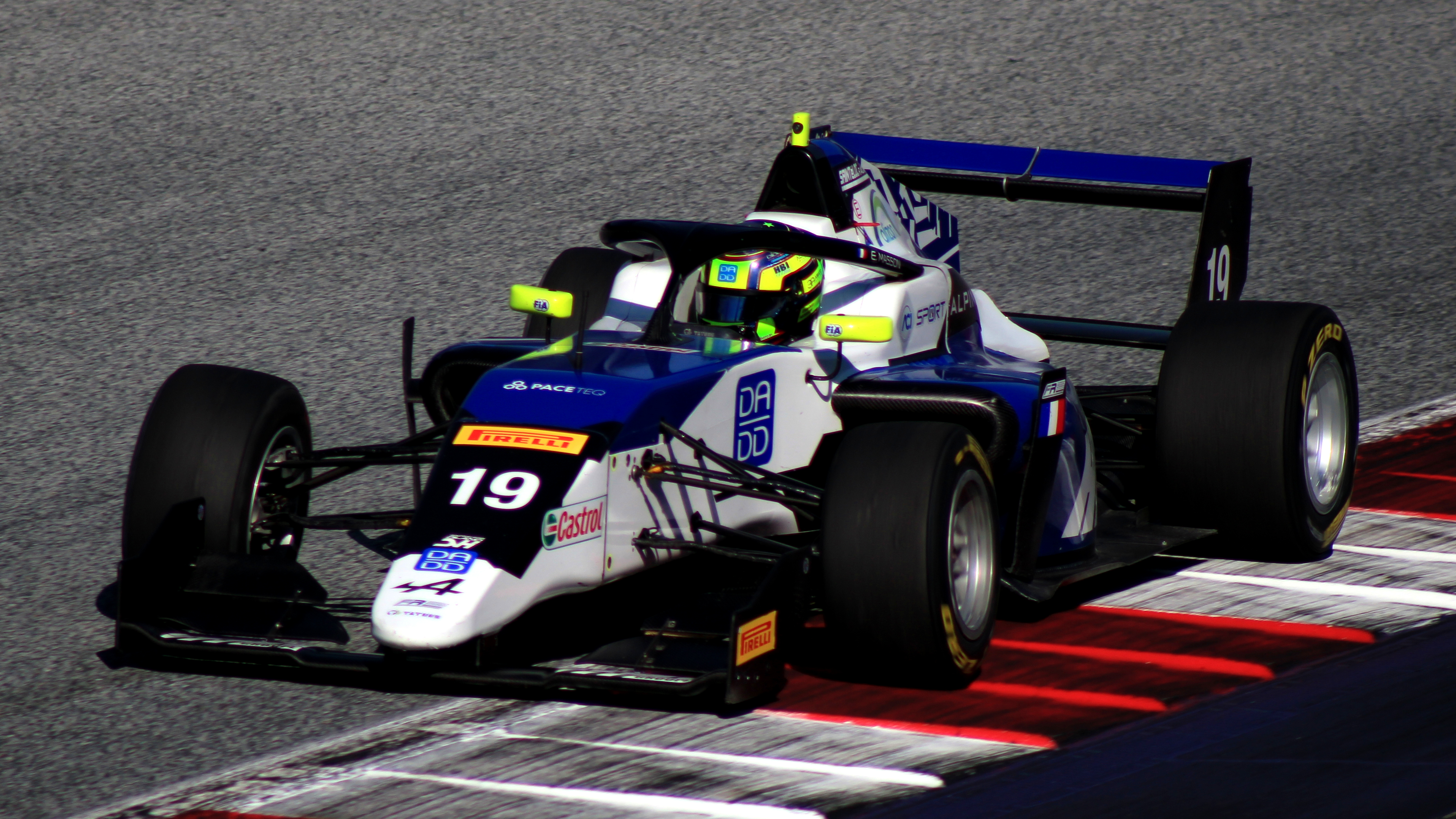
Masson racing in the 2023 Formula Regional European Championship at the Red Bull Ring.

Masson returned to the Formula Regional European Championship with Saintéloc Racing during the Hungaroring weekend. Masson scored his and Saintéloc's first podium in FRECA with a second place in Circuit Paul Ricard. With three other points finishes, he ranked 16th in the standings.

=== Eurocup-3 ===
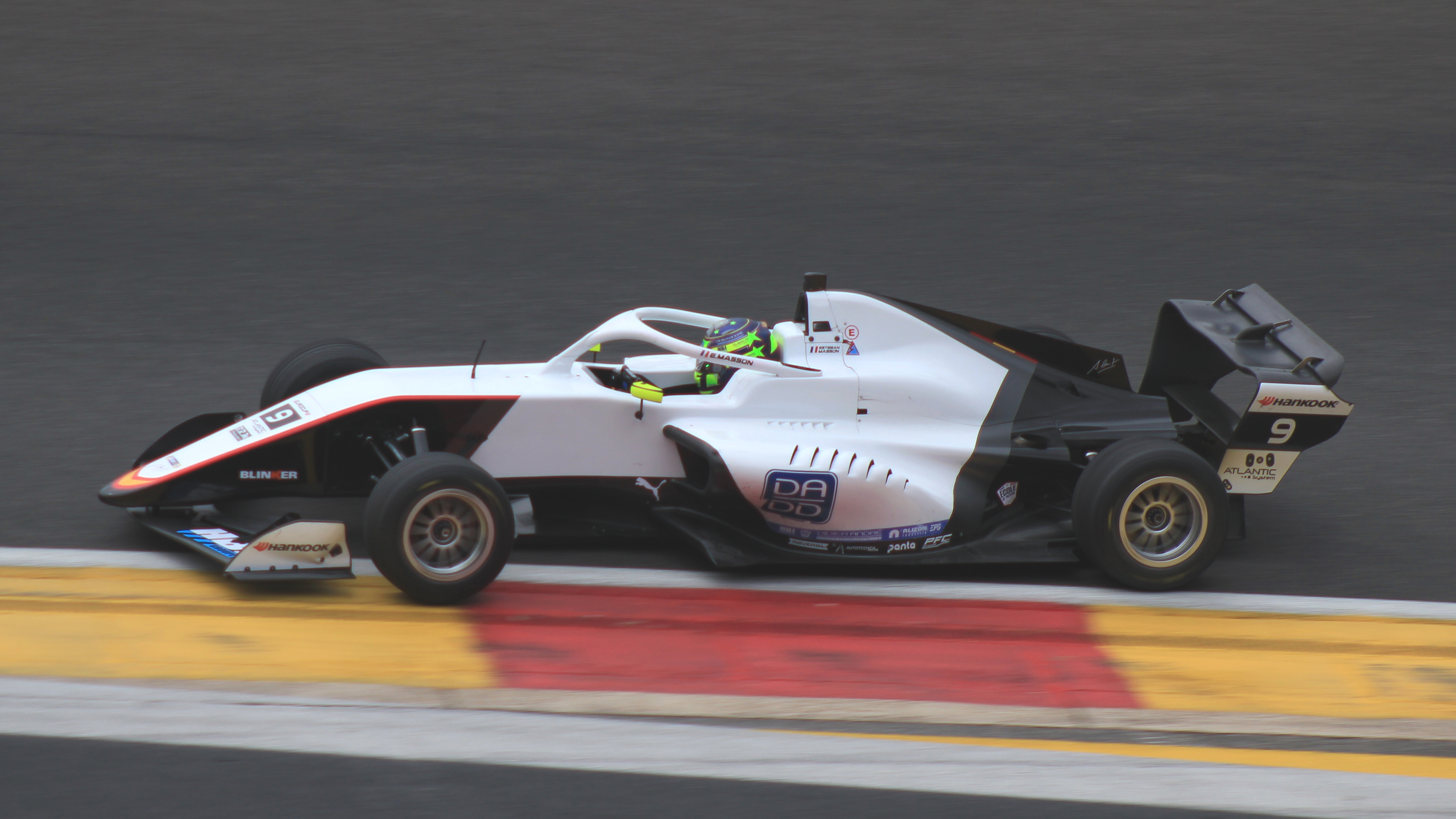
Masson racing in the 2023 Eurocup-3 season at Spa-Francorchamps.

Masson moved to Eurocup-3 for 2023, with Campos Racing. After a slow start to the season, Masson secured a double victory in Aragón. After a double podium in Monza propped him to the championship lead, second double victory in Zandvoort handed him a further cushion. However, he was forced to endure a double DNF in Circuito de Jerez, which significantly reduced his lead. The next two rounds would see title rival Mari Boya haul closer into title contention with two wins and two podiums, with Masson's podiums only being his two wins, reducing the gap between the two to a single point heading into the season finale in Barcelona. However, he controlled things perfectly by winning both races, clinching the title.

=== Super Formula Lights ===
Masson returned to single-seaters in 2025, competing in the Super Formula Lights with TOM'S.

== Sportscar career ==
=== 2023 ===
Masson made his debut in endurance racing in the final round of the 2023 FIA World Endurance Championship at the 8 Hours of Bahrain. He joined Kessel Racing in the LMGTE Am category. He finished in fifth place.

=== 2024 ===
For 2024, Masson pivoted to the World Endurance Championship on a full-time basis, joining Akkodis ASP Team in the LMGT3 category alongside José María López and Takeshi Kimura. In a challenging season for the team, Masson only finished in the points at Le Mans, ending up 27th in the drivers' standings.

In addition, Masson partnered Kimura and Daniel Serra at Kessel Racing in the European Le Mans Series. After a modest start to the campaign, the trio finished fourth at Imola. At Spa, Masson passed Jonny Adam and Casper Stevenson for the lead during the third hour, leading the team to a dominant victory. The team won again at Mugello thanks to a late overtake from Serra on Lorcan Hanafin. The trio looked to have secured the LMGT3 title by finishing fifth at Portimão, but a late team order from the Iron Lynx outfit caused the Kessel crew to drop to second in the standings on the final lap.

=== 2025 ===
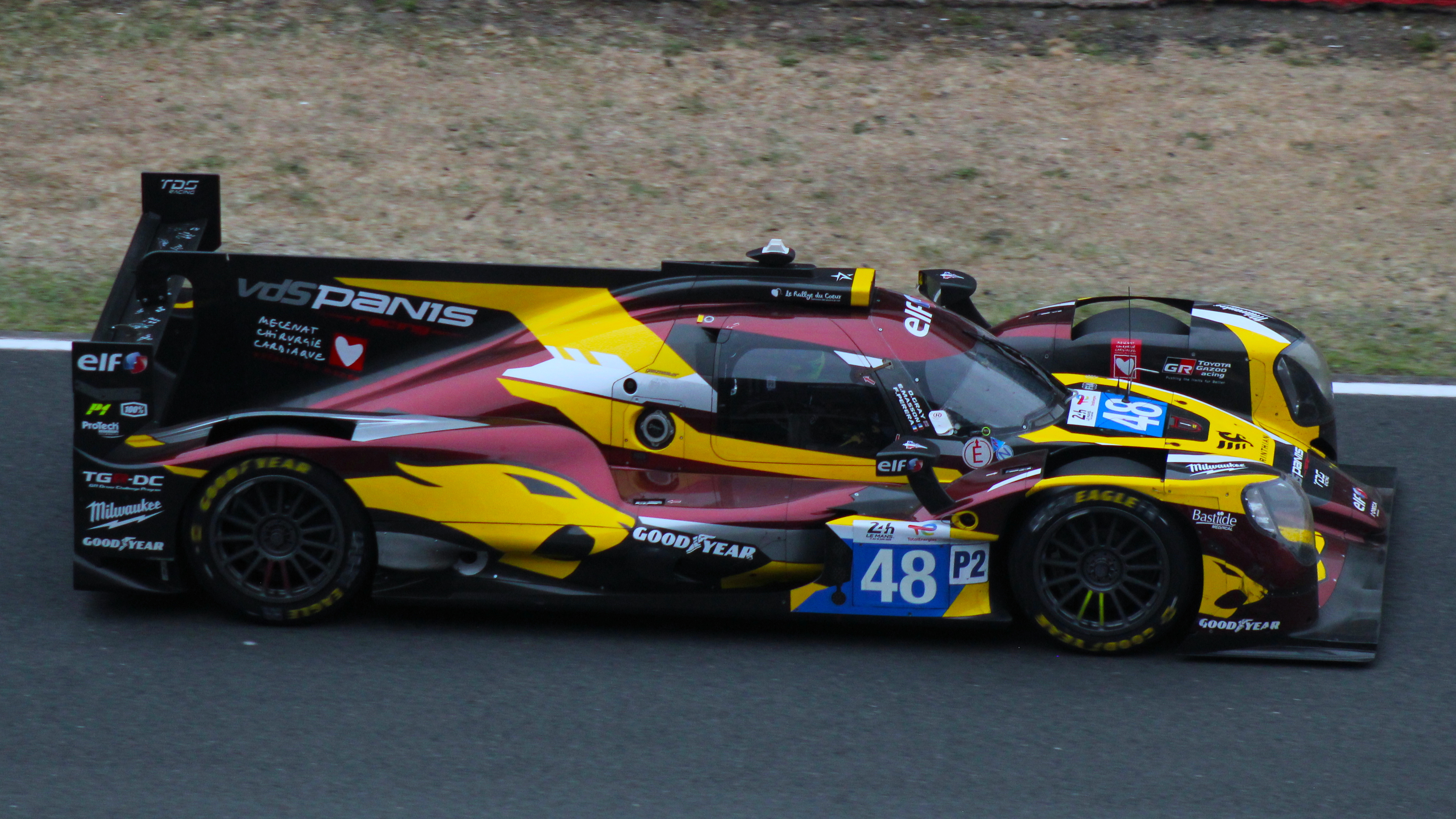
Masson's No. 48 car at the 2025 24 Hours of Le Mans

Masson would step up to sports prototypes for 2025, racing in the LMP2 class of the European Le Mans Series for VDS Panis Racing alongside Ollie Gray and Charles Milesi. After finishing second in the Pro class at Barcelona and sixth in class at Le Castellet, the trio took victory at Imola. A commanding middle part of the race from Masson allowed VDS Panis to win again at Spa. Masson then claimed pole at Silverstone in his first ever LMP2 qualifying appearance. During the race, a penalty for Gray set the team back, leaving the No. 48 eighth in class. Nevertheless, Masson and his teammates were able to clinch the LMP2 title by winning the Portimão finale in dominant fashion.

Masson also raced for the team at the 24 Hours of Le Mans, partnering Gray and Franck Perera. Having fought for the lead alongside the No. 43 Inter Europol Competition entry from the race's second half onwards, Masson looked to have secured victory when rival Nick Yelloly received a drive-through penalty. However, a suspension failure with 15 minutes to go allowed Inter Europol to re-take the lead, with Masson nursing the car home in second place. At the end of the year, Masson was given an honourable mention by online magazine Dailysportscar in its article about the Prototype Driver of the Year.

=== 2026 ===
At the start of 2026, Masson competed in the 24 Hours of Daytona with Vasser Sullivan Racing in the GTD category, finishing ninth. He performed double duties during the main campaign, partnering Gray and Louis Rousset at Forestier Racing by Panis to defend their ELMS title, and driving with Hadrien David and Tom Van Rompuy at Akkodis ASP in the World Championship.

The ELMS season started with a win at Barcelona, where Masson went on a late charge to pass Ben Hanley, Jack Doohan, and Reshad de Gerus in the final stint. He then took pole position at Le Castellet, but retired with a technical issue while running second. Masson drove for Forestier Racing at Le Mans, where he set the fastest time in qualifying and finished third in class during the race. He scored another pole at Imola, where he undercut the No. 22 United Autosports car of Hanley for the lead before driving out a gap of almost one minute in the final hour. The team finished on the rostrum at Spa, being promoted to second post-race thanks to a penalty for the Vector Sport entry. At a rain-affected Silverstone, the Forestier entry suffered a huge blow in the championship fight, finishing ninth after Gray lost two laps by spinning into the gravel during a downpour.

== Racing record ==
=== Racing career summary ===
Season	Series	Team	Races	Wins	Poles	F/Laps	Podiums	Points	Position
2019	French F4 Championship	FFSA Academy	3	0	0	0	0	0	NC†
2020	French F4 Championship	FFSA Academy	3	0	0	0	0	0	NC†
2021	French F4 Championship	FFSA Academy	20	6	9	5	10	236	**1st**
2022	Formula Regional European Championship	FA Racing by MP	12	0	0	0	0	1	24th
2022	Formula Regional European Championship	ART Grand Prix	8	0	0	0	0	1	24th
2023	Eurocup-3	Campos Racing	16	8	6	7	10	273	**1st**
2023	Formula Regional European Championship	Saintéloc Racing	12	0	0	0	1	39	16th
2023	FIA World Endurance Championship - LMGTE Am	Kessel Racing	1	0	0	0	0	15	21st
2024	FIA World Endurance Championship - LMGT3	Akkodis ASP Team	8	0	0	0	0	8	27th
2024	European Le Mans Series - LMGT3	Kessel Racing	6	2	0	2	2	74	**2nd**
2024–25	Asian Le Mans Series - GT	CarGuy Racing	2	1	0	0	1	25	15th
2025	European Le Mans Series - LMP2	VDS Panis Racing	6	3	1	0	4	106	**1st**
2025	24 Hours of Le Mans – LMP2	VDS Panis Racing	1	0	0	0	1	N/A	**2nd**
2025	Super Formula Lights	TOM'S	15	0	0	0	3	31	7th
2025	FIA World Endurance Championship - LMGT3	Akkodis ASP Team	1	0	0	0	1	15	21st
2025	Nürburgring Langstrecken-Serie - SP8T	Toyota Gazoo Racing	2	0	0	0	0	3	NC†
2025	Nürburgring Langstrecken-Serie - SP8T	KCMG	1	0	0	0	0	3	NC†
2026	FIA World Endurance Championship - LMGT3	Akkodis ASP Team	7	0	2	0	0	5	24th
2026	European Le Mans Series - LMP2	Forestier Racing by Panis	6	2	2	1	3	84	**2nd**
2026	24 Hours of Le Mans – LMP2	Forestier Racing by Panis	1	0	1	0	1	N/A	**3rd**
2026	IMSA SportsCar Championship - GTD	Vasser Sullivan Racing	1	0	0	0	0	237	68th
2026	24 Hours of Le Mans - Hypercar	Toyota Racing	Reserve driver						
2026–27	Asian Le Mans Series – GT3	CarGuy Racing						*	*
2027	FIA World Endurance Championship - Hypercar	Toyota Racing	Reserve driver						

^{*} Season still in progress.
^{†} As Masson was a guest driver, he was ineligible to score points.

=== Complete French F4 Championship results ===
(key) (Races in bold indicate pole position) (Races in italics indicate fastest lap)

Year	1	2	3	4	5	6	7	8	9	10	11	12	13	14	15	16	17	18	19	20	21	Pos	Points
2019	NOG; 1	NOG; 2	NOG; 3	PAU; 1	PAU; 2	PAU; 3	SPA; 1	SPA; 2	SPA; 3	LÉD; 1	LÉD; 2	LÉD; 3	HUN; 1	HUN; 2	HUN; 3	MAG; 1	MAG; 2	MAG; 3	LEC; 1; 18	LEC; 2; 12	LEC; 3; 11	NC†	0
2020	NOG; 1	NOG; 2	NOG; 3	MAG; 1	MAG; 2	MAG; 3	ZAN; 1	ZAN; 2	ZAN; 3	LEC1; 1	LEC1; 2	LEC1; 3	SPA; 1	SPA; 2	SPA; 3	LEC2; 1	LEC2; 2	LEC2; 3	LEC3; 1; 4	LEC3; 2; 11	LEC3; 3; 8	NC†	0
2021	**NOG**; **1**; 1	NOG; 2; 6	**NOG**; **3**; 3	**MAG1**; **1**; 4	MAG1; 2; 1	**MAG1**; **3**; 1	**HUN**; **1**; 1	HUN; 2 Ret	HUN; 3; 2	LÉD; 1; 2	LÉD; 2; 6	LÉD; 3; 5	MNZ; 1 Ret	MNZ; 2; 4	MNZ; 3 C	**LEC**; **1**; 2	LEC; 2; 18	**LEC**; **3**; 1	**MAG2**; **1**; 1	MAG2; 2 Ret	**MAG2**; **3**; 13†	1st	236

^{†} As Masson was a guest driver, he was ineligible to score points.

=== Complete Formula Regional European Championship results ===
(key) (Races in bold indicate pole position) (Races in italics indicate fastest lap)

Year	Team	1	2	3	4	5	6	7	8	9	10	11	12	13	14	15	16	17	18	19	20	DC	Points
2022	FA Racing by MP	MNZ; 1; 17	MNZ; 2; 22	IMO; 1; 23	IMO; 2; 20	MCO; 1; 14	MCO; 2; 15	LEC; 1; 32	LEC; 2 Ret	ZAN; 1; 14	ZAN; 2 Ret	HUN; 1; 10	HUN; 2; 11									24th	1
2022	ART Grand Prix													SPA; 1; 17	SPA; 2; 22	RBR; 1; 22	RBR; 2 Ret	CAT; 1; 19	CAT; 2; 16	MUG; 1; 19	MUG; 2; 22	24th	1
2023	Saintéloc Racing	IMO; 1	IMO; 2	CAT; 1	CAT; 2	HUN; 1; 15	HUN; 2; 11	SPA; 1; 17	SPA; 2; 11	MUG; 1	MUG; 2	LEC; 1; 13	LEC; 2; 2	RBR; 1; 13	RBR; 2; 4	MNZ; 1; 6	MNZ; 2; 16	ZAN; 1	ZAN; 2	HOC; 1 Ret	HOC; 2 Ret	16th	39

* Season still in progress.

=== Complete Eurocup-3 results ===
(key) (Races in bold indicate pole position) (Races in italics indicate fastest lap)

Year	Team	1	2	3	4	5	6	7	8	9	10	11	12	13	14	15	16	DC	Points
2023	Campos Racing	SPA; 1; 6	SPA; 2; 7	ARA; 1; 1	**ARA**; **2**; 1	MNZ; 1; 3	MNZ; 2; 3	**ZAN**; **1**; 1	ZAN; 2; 1	JER; 1 Ret	JER; 2 Ret	**EST**; **1**; 1	EST; 2; 14	**CRT**; **1**; 1	CRT; 2; 5	**CAT**; **1**; 1	**CAT**; **2**; 1	1st	273

=== Complete FIA World Endurance Championship results ===
(key) (Races in bold indicate pole position; races in italics indicate fastest lap)

Year	Entrant	Class	Car	Engine	1	2	3	4	5	6	7	8	Rank	Points
2023	Kessel Racing	LMGTE Am	Ferrari 488 GTE Evo	Ferrari F154CB 3.9 L Turbo V8	SEB	ALG	SPA	LMS	MNZ	FUJ	BHR; 5		21st	15
2024	Akkodis ASP Team	LMGT3	Lexus RC F GT3	Lexus 2UR-GSE 5.0 L V8	QAT; 16	IMO; 15	SPA; 14	LMS; 10	SÃO; 11	COA; 11	FUJ; 12	BHR; Ret	27th	8
2025	Akkodis ASP Team	LMGT3	Lexus RC F GT3	Lexus 2UR-GSE 5.0 L V8	QAT	IMO; 3	SPA	LMS	SÃO	COA	FUJ	BHR	21st	15
2026	Akkodis ASP Team	LMGT3	Lexus RC F GT3	Lexus 2UR-GSE 5.0 L V8	IMO; 14	**SPA**; Ret	LMS	SÃO; 14	COA; NC	FUJ; 9	CAT; 14	**MNZ**; 10	24th	5

=== Complete European Le Mans Series results ===
(key) (Races in bold indicate pole position; results in italics indicate fastest lap)

Year	Entrant	Class	Chassis	Engine	1	2	3	4	5	6	Rank	Points
2024	Kessel Racing	LMGT3	Ferrari 296 GT3	Ferrari F163 3.0 L Turbo V6	CAT; 9	LEC; Ret	IMO; 4	SPA; 1	MUG; 1	ALG; 5	2nd	74
2025	VDS Panis Racing	LMP2	Oreca 07	Gibson GK428 4.2 L V8	CAT; 2	LEC; 6	IMO; 1	SPA; 1	**SIL**; 8	ALG; 1	1st	106
2026	Forestier Racing by Panis	LMP2	Oreca 07	Gibson GK428 4.2 L V8	CAT; 1	**LEC**; Ret	**IMO**; 1	SPA; 2	SIL; 9	ALG; 4	2nd	84

^{*} Season still in progress.

=== Complete 24 Hours of Le Mans results ===
Year	Team	Co-Drivers	Car	Class	Laps	Pos.	Class Pos.
2024	(France) Akkodis ASP Team	(United Kingdom) Jack Hawksworth (Japan) Takeshi Kimura	Lexus RC F GT3	LMGT3	279	37th	10th
2025	(France) VDS Panis Racing	(United Kingdom) Oliver Gray (France) Franck Perera	Oreca 07-Gibson	LMP2	367	19th	**2nd**
2026	(France) Forestier Racing by Panis	(United Kingdom) Oliver Gray (France) Louis Rousset	Oreca 07-Gibson	LMP2	360	17th	**3rd**

=== Complete Super Formula Lights results ===
(key) (Races in bold indicate pole position) (Races in italics indicate fastest lap)

Year	Entrant	1	2	3	4	5	6	7	8	9	10	11	12	13	14	15	16	17	18	Pos	Points
2025	TOM'S	SUZ; 1 WD	SUZ; 2 WD	SUZ; 3 WD	AUT; 1; 3	AUT; 2; 5	OKA; 1; 7	OKA; 2; 2	OKA; 3; 5	SUG; 1; 5	SUG; 2 Ret	SUG; 3; 4	SUG; 4; 7	FUJ; 1; 2	FUJ; 2; 5	FUJ; 3; 7	MOT; 1; 8	MOT; 2; 6	MOT; 3; 8	7th	31

=== Complete IMSA SportsCar Championship results ===
(key) (Races in bold indicate pole position; races in italics indicate fastest lap)

Year	Entrant	Class	Make	Engine	1	2	3	4	5	6	7	8	9	10	Rank	Points
2026	Vasser Sullivan Racing	GTD	Lexus RC F GT3	Toyota 2UR-GSE 5.0 L V8	DAY; 9	SEB	LBH	LGA	WGL	MOS	ELK	VIR	IMS	PET	68th	237

Sporting positions
Preceded by Ayumu Iwasa	French F4 Championship; Champion; 2021	Succeeded by Alessandro Giusti
Preceded by Inaugural	Eurocup-3; Champion; 2023	Succeeded by Christian Ho
Preceded by Louis Delétraz; Robert Kubica; Jonny Edgar	European Le Mans Series; LMP2 Champion; 2025; With: Oliver Gray & Charles Milesi	Succeeded by Incumbent
