= Valentino Catalano =

German racing driver (born 2005)

- Catalano in 2023
- Nationality: (Germany) German
- Born: 2 November 2005 (age 21) Westheim, Rhineland-Palatinate, Germany

Prototype Cup Germany career
- Debut season: 2023
- Current team: Gebhardt Motorsport
- Categorisation: FIA Silver
- Car number: 70
- Co-driver: Robin Rogalski, Markus Pommer
- Former teams: DKR Engineering
- Starts: 24
- Wins: 4
- Poles: 6
- Fastest laps: 0
- Best finish: 1st in 2024

Previous series
- 2023–25 2022 2021 2020: Prototype Cup Germany; Le Mans Cup; ADAC Formula 4 French F4 Championship

Championship titles
- 2025 2024: IMSA VP Racing SCC – LMP3; Prototype Cup Germany

Valentino Catalano (born 2 November 2005) is a German racing driver. He won the 2024 Prototype Cup Germany alongside Markus Pommer and became the 2025 IMSA VP Racing SportsCar Challenge champion.

== Early career ==
=== Karting ===
Catalano started karting at the Motorclub Haßloch at the age of five. In 2018, he won the X30 Junior category of the ADAC Kart Cup with RMW Motorsport after finishing fourth in the ADAC Kart Bundesendlauf.

=== Formula 4 ===
In 2019, Catalano begin testing in a privately owned Tatuus F4-T014. In 2020 he began competing in single-seaters, driving in the French F4 Championship. Having been part of the junior class given his age, the German would dominate, taking wins in every race for the juniors' standings, whilst finishing on the overall podium four times. With him finishing inside the top ten throughout each event, Catalano ended up fifth in the FFSA Academy classification.

For the 2021 season, a move to BWR Motorsports would be in order for Catalano, who would be driving in the ADAC Formula 4 Championship. However, Catalano ended up splitting up from the team after merely two rounds, in which he had scored a best finish of fifth.

== Sportscar career ==
=== 2022: LMP3 debut ===
Catalano made his sportscar debut in 2022, driving in the LMP3 category of the European Le Mans Series. Teaming up with Horst Felbermayr Jr. and Austin McCusker at RLR MSport, Catalano experienced a testing campaign, as three retirements meant that he would finish 15th in the drivers' standings.

=== 2023: First win ===
At the start of 2023, Catalano paired up with Tom van Rompuy at DKR Engineering for a campaign in the Asian Le Mans Series. The second race in Dubai saw an impressive performance from the pairing, with an aggressive fuel strategy paying off to give Catalano his maiden victory in car racing. He then went on to compete in the 2023 Prototype Cup Germany with the same team and Robin Rogalski as his teammate. He took his maiden victory in the series Motorsport Arena Oschersleben and finished the season fourth in the standings.

== Karting record ==
=== Karting career summary ===
| Season | Series | Team | Position |
|---|---|---|---|
| 2017 | ADAC Kart Masters — X30 Junior | | 3rd |
| 2018 | ADAC Kart Masters — X30 Junior | | 3rd |
| 2018 | ADAC Kart Bundesendlauf — X30 Junior | RMW Motorsport | 4th |

== Racing record ==
=== Racing career summary ===
| Season | Series | Team | Races | Wins | Poles | F/Laps | Podiums | Points | Position |
|---|---|---|---|---|---|---|---|---|---|
| 2020 | French F4 Championship | FFSA Academy | 21 | 0 | 0 | 0 | 4 | 144 | 5th |
| 2021 | ADAC Formula 4 Championship | BWR Motorsports | 6 | 0 | 0 | 0 | 0 | 10 | 18th |
| 2021 | Drexler Automotive Formula 4 Cup | BWR Motorsports | 2 | 0 | 0 | 0 | 2 | 33 | 4th |
| 2022 | European Le Mans Series - LMP3 | RLR MSport | 6 | 0 | 0 | 0 | 0 | 18 | 15th |
| 2022 | Le Mans Cup - LMP3 | RLR MSport | 1 | 0 | 0 | 0 | 0 | 0 | NC |
| 2023 | Asian Le Mans Series - LMP3 | DKR Engineering | 4 | 1 | 0 | 0 | 1 | 43 | 4th |
| 2023 | Prototype Cup Germany | DKR Engineering | 12 | 1 | 3 | 2 | 4 | 130 | 4th |
| 2024 | Prototype Cup Germany | Gebhardt Motorsport | 12 | 3 | 2 | 0 | 10 | 206 | **1st** |
| 2024 | Prototype Winter Series - Class 3 | Gebhardt Motorsport | 3 | 0 | 0 | 0 | 0 | 6.67 | 14th |
| 2024 | IMSA VP Racing SportsCar Challenge - LMP3 | Gebhardt Intralogistics Motorsports | 2 | 0 | 0 | 0 | 2 | 600 | 15th |
| 2024 | Nürburgring Langstrecken-Serie - VT2-R+4WD | Adrenalin Motorsport Team Mainhatten Wheels | 2 | 0 | 0 | 0 | 0 | 0 | NC† |
| 2025 | IMSA VP Racing SportsCar Challenge - LMP3 | Gebhardt Motorsport | 12 | 8 | 8 | 5 | 10 | 3980 | **1st** |
| 2025 | Le Mans Cup - LMP3 | Gebhardt Motorsport | 6 | 0 | 0 | 0 | 1 | 22 | 12th |
| 2025 | Prototype Cup Germany | Badischer Motorsport Club | 4 | 2 | 0 | 0 | 3 | 91 | 9th |
| 2025 | Prototype Cup Germany | Gebhardt Motorsport | 2 | 0 | 0 | 0 | 0 | 91 | 9th |
| 2026 | IMSA VP Racing SportsCar Challenge - LMP3 | Gebhardt Motorsport | 4 | 1 | 4 | 0 | 3 | 1180 | 12th |
| 2026 | Prototype Cup Europe | German Motor Sports Team | 8 | 2 | 3 | 2 | 6 | 150 | **2nd** |
| 2026–27 | Asian Le Mans Cup – LMP3 Pro | GMS | | | | | | | |

^{†} As Catalano was a guest driver, he was ineligible for points.
^{*} Season still in progress.

=== Complete French F4 Championship results ===
(key) (Races in bold indicate pole position) (Races in italics indicate fastest lap)

| Year | 1 | 2 | 3 | 4 | 5 | 6 | 7 | 8 | 9 | 10 | 11 | 12 | 13 | 14 | 15 | 16 | 17 | 18 | 19 | 20 | 21 | Pos | Points |
|---|---|---|---|---|---|---|---|---|---|---|---|---|---|---|---|---|---|---|---|---|---|---|---|
| 2020 | NOG; 1; 8 | NOG; 2; 2 | NOG; 3; 7 | MAG; 1; 6 | MAG; 2; 7 | MAG; 3; 7 | ZAN; 1; 6 | ZAN; 2; 5 | ZAN; 3; 3 | LEC1; 1; 4 | LEC1; 2; 5 | LEC1; 3; 6 | SPA; 1; 6 | SPA; 2; 6 | SPA; 3; 5 | LEC2; 1; 3 | LEC2; 2; 6 | LEC2; 3; 6 | LEC3; 1; 8 | LEC3; 2; 3 | LEC3; 3; 10 | 5th | 144 |

=== Complete ADAC Formula 4 Championship results ===
(key) (Races in bold indicate pole position) (Races in italics indicate fastest lap)

| Year | Team | 1 | 2 | 3 | 4 | 5 | 6 | 7 | 8 | 9 | 10 | 11 | 12 | 13 | 14 | 15 | 16 | 17 | 18 | Pos | Points |
|---|---|---|---|---|---|---|---|---|---|---|---|---|---|---|---|---|---|---|---|---|---|
| 2021 | BWR Motorsports | RBR; 1; 18 | RBR; 2; 14 | RBR; 3; 5 | ZAN; 1; 13 | ZAN; 2; 14 | ZAN; 3 Ret | HOC1; 1 | HOC1; 2 | HOC1; 3 | SAC; 1 | SAC; 2 | SAC; 3 | HOC2; 1 | HOC2; 2 | HOC2; 3 | NÜR; 1 | NÜR; 2 | NÜR; 3 | 18th | 10 |

=== Complete European Le Mans Series results ===
(key) (Races in bold indicate pole position; results in italics indicate fastest lap)

| Year | Entrant | Class | Chassis | Engine | 1 | 2 | 3 | 4 | 5 | 6 | Rank | Points |
|---|---|---|---|---|---|---|---|---|---|---|---|---|
| 2022 | RLR MSport | LMP3 | Ligier JS P320 | Nissan VK56DE 5.6L V8 | LEC; Ret | IMO; 6 | MNZ; Ret | CAT; 8 | SPA; Ret | ALG; 7 | 15th | 18 |

=== Complete Asian Le Mans Series results ===
(key) (Races in bold indicate pole position) (Races in italics indicate fastest lap)

| Year | Team | Class | Car | Engine | 1 | 2 | 3 | 4 | Pos. | Points |
|---|---|---|---|---|---|---|---|---|---|---|
| 2023 | DKR Engineering | LMP3 | Duqueine M30 - D08 | Nissan VK56DE 5.6L V8 | DUB; 1; 6 | DUB; 2; 1 | ABU; 1; 5 | ABU; 2 Ret | 4th | 43 |

=== Complete Prototype Cup Germany results ===
(key) (Races in bold indicate pole position) (Races in italics indicate fastest lap)

| Year | Team | Car | Engine | 1 | 2 | 3 | 4 | 5 | 6 | 7 | 8 | 9 | 10 | 11 | 12 | 13 | 14 | DC | Points |
|---|---|---|---|---|---|---|---|---|---|---|---|---|---|---|---|---|---|---|---|
| 2023 | DKR Engineering | Duqueine M30 - D08 | Nissan VK56DE 5.6 L V8 | HOC; 1; 6 | **HOC**; **2**; 2 | OSC; 1; 3 | **OSC**; **2**; 1 | ZAN; 1; 6 | ZAN; 2; 2 | NOR; 1 Ret | NOR; 2 Ret | ASS; 1; 5 | **ASS**; **2**; 8† | NÜR; 1; 7 | NÜR; 2 Ret | | | 4th | 130 |
| 2024 | Gebhardt Motorsport | Duqueine M30 - D08 | Nissan VK56DE 5.6 L V8 | **SPA**; **1** C | SPA; 2 C | **LAU**; **1**; 1 | LAU; 2; 3 | LAU; 3; 2 | ZAN; 1; 3 | ZAN; 2; 5 | HOC; 1 DNS | HOC; 2; 2 | HOC; 3; 3 | NÜR; 1; 4 | NÜR; 2; 2 | SAC; 1; 1 | SAC; 2; 3 | 1st | 206 |

^{*} Season still in progress.

=== Complete Le Mans Cup results ===
(key) (Races in bold indicate pole position; results in italics indicate fastest lap)

| Year | Entrant | Class | Chassis | 1 | 2 | 3 | 4 | 5 | 6 | 7 | Rank | Points |
|---|---|---|---|---|---|---|---|---|---|---|---|---|
| 2025 | Gebhardt Motorsport | LMP3 | Duqueine D09 | CAT; Ret | LEC; Ret | LMS; 1; 10 | LMS; 2; 3 | SPA | SIL; 10 | ALG; 4 | 12th | 22 |

^{*} Season still in progress.
