= 2020 French F4 Championship =

French motorsport season

The 2020 French F4 Championship was the tenth season to run under the guise of the French F4 Championship and the third under the FIA Formula 4 regulations. The championship used Mygale M14-F4 chassis. For 2020, the series used a new 1.3-liter turbocharged engine produced by Renault Sport, replacing the previously used 2.0-litre naturally aspirated engine. The series began on 21 August at Circuit Paul Armagnac and ended on 22 November at Circuit Paul Ricard.

== Driver lineup ==
No.	Driver	Class	Rounds
2	(Netherlands) Marijn Kremers		1–3, 5–7
2	(France) Étienne Cheli	G	4
4	(Japan) Ayumu Iwasa		All
6	(France) Isack Hadjar		All
7	(France) Sami Meguetounif		All
8	(Mexico) Rafael Villagómez		1–5, 7
9	(France) Esteban Masson	G	7
11	(Germany) Valentino Catalano	J	All
12	(France) Loris Cabirou		All
16	(Singapore) Romain Leroux		All
17	(France) Noah Andy		All
22	(France) Daniël Ligier	J	All
23	(Ukraine) Ivan Peklin		All
69	(Russia) Lev Lomko		1–3, 5–6
71	(India) Yash Aradhya	G	4
79	(France) Owen Tangavelou		All
85	(Japan) Ren Sato		All

Icon	Status
J	Drivers that compete for the Junior Championship
G	Guest drivers ineligible for Drivers' Championship

== Race calendar ==
On 22 April 2020 the series announced a seven-round calendar with a delayed start to the season due to the 2019-20 coronavirus pandemic. The round at Pau that was postponed on 17 March 2020 and not included on the new schedule. The 3rd round scheduled at Hungaroring was replaced by Circuit Zandvoort. The penultimate round of the season at Circuit de Lédenon was cancelled by the circuit and the organizers. The final round at Bugatti Circuit in Le Mans was called off by local authorities. The additional rounds were scheduled to take place at Circuit Paul Ricard.

Round		Circuit	Date	Pole position	Fastest lap	Winning driver	Junior Winner
1	R1	(France) Circuit Paul Armagnac, Nogaro	22 August	(Japan) Ayumu Iwasa	(Japan) Ren Sato	(Japan) Ayumu Iwasa	(Germany) Valentino Catalano
1	R2	(France) Circuit Paul Armagnac, Nogaro	22 August		(Japan) Ren Sato	(Russia) Lev Lomko	(Germany) Valentino Catalano
1	R3	(France) Circuit Paul Armagnac, Nogaro	23 August	(Japan) Ayumu Iwasa	(Japan) Ayumu Iwasa	(Japan) Ayumu Iwasa	(Germany) Valentino Catalano
2	R1	(France) Circuit de Nevers Magny-Cours, Magny-Cours	12 September	(Japan) Ren Sato	(Japan) Ren Sato	(Japan) Ren Sato	(Germany) Valentino Catalano
2	R2	(France) Circuit de Nevers Magny-Cours, Magny-Cours	12 September		(Japan) Ren Sato	(Ukraine) Ivan Peklin	(Germany) Valentino Catalano
2	R3	(France) Circuit de Nevers Magny-Cours, Magny-Cours	13 September	(Japan) Ren Sato	(Japan) Ren Sato	(Japan) Ren Sato	(Germany) Valentino Catalano
3	R1	(Netherlands) Circuit Zandvoort, Zandvoort	26 September	(Netherlands) Marijn Kremers	(Japan) Ayumu Iwasa	(Japan) Ayumu Iwasa	(Germany) Valentino Catalano
3	R2	(Netherlands) Circuit Zandvoort, Zandvoort	27 September		(Japan) Ayumu Iwasa	(France) Romain Leroux	(Germany) Valentino Catalano
3	R3	(Netherlands) Circuit Zandvoort, Zandvoort	27 September	(Ukraine) Ivan Peklin (Note: Marijn Kremers scored pole for race 3 but was issued a 1-place grid penalty for causing a collision in race 2. Kremers still collected the bonus point for qualifying on pole position.)	(Japan) Ayumu Iwasa	(Japan) Ayumu Iwasa	(Germany) Valentino Catalano
4	R1	(France) Circuit Paul Ricard, Le Castellet (Circuit 1A-V2)	3 October	(Japan) Ayumu Iwasa	(Japan) Ren Sato	(Japan) Ayumu Iwasa	(Germany) Valentino Catalano
4	R2	(France) Circuit Paul Ricard, Le Castellet (Circuit 1A-V2)	3 October		(France) Isack Hadjar	(Japan) Ren Sato	(Germany) Valentino Catalano
4	R3	(France) Circuit Paul Ricard, Le Castellet (Circuit 1A-V2)	4 October	(Japan) Ayumu Iwasa	(France) Isack Hadjar	(Japan) Ayumu Iwasa	(Germany) Valentino Catalano
5	R1	(Belgium) Circuit de Spa-Francorchamps, Spa	17 October	(France) Sami Meguetounif	(France) Isack Hadjar	(Japan) Ayumu Iwasa	(Germany) Valentino Catalano
5	R2	(Belgium) Circuit de Spa-Francorchamps, Spa	18 October		(Japan) Ayumu Iwasa	(Japan) Ren Sato	(Germany) Valentino Catalano
5	R3	(Belgium) Circuit de Spa-Francorchamps, Spa	18 October	(France) Sami Meguetounif	(France) Sami Meguetounif	(Japan) Ayumu Iwasa	(Germany) Valentino Catalano
6	R1	(France) Circuit Paul Ricard, Le Castellet (Circuit 1A-V2)	13 November	(France) Isack Hadjar	(Japan) Ayumu Iwasa	(France) Isack Hadjar	(Germany) Valentino Catalano
6	R2	(France) Circuit Paul Ricard, Le Castellet (Circuit 1A-V2)	14 November		(France) Isack Hadjar	(France) Sami Meguetounif	(Germany) Valentino Catalano
6	R3	(France) Circuit Paul Ricard, Le Castellet (Circuit 1A-V2)	15 November	(France) Isack Hadjar	(France) Isack Hadjar	(France) Isack Hadjar	(Germany) Valentino Catalano
7	R1	(France) Circuit Paul Ricard, Le Castellet (Circuit 3C)	21 November	(Japan) Ayumu Iwasa	(Japan) Ayumu Iwasa	(France) Isack Hadjar	(Germany) Valentino Catalano
7	R2	(France) Circuit Paul Ricard, Le Castellet (Circuit 3C)	21 November		(France) Isack Hadjar	(France) Loris Cabirou	(Germany) Valentino Catalano
7	R3	(France) Circuit Paul Ricard, Le Castellet (Circuit 3C)	22 November	(Japan) Ayumu Iwasa	(Mexico) Rafael Villagómez	(Japan) Ayumu Iwasa	(Germany) Valentino Catalano
Cancelled due to the 2019-20 coronavirus pandemic
–		(France) Circuit de Lédenon, Lédenon	6–8 November				
–		(France) Bugatti Circuit, Le Mans	13–15 November				

== Championship standings ==
Points system

Points were awarded as follows:

Races	Position										Bonus	
Races	1st	2nd	3rd	4th	5th	6th	7th	8th	9th	10th	PP	FL
Races 1 & 3	25	18	15	12	10	8	6	4	2	1	**1**	1
Race 2	15	12	10	8	6	4	2	1	0	0	–	1

Each driver's lowest scoring meeting was omitted from their final point total.

=== Drivers' standings – FFSA Academy ===
Pos	Driver	NOG (France)			MAG (France)			ZAN (Netherlands)			LEC1 (France)			SPA (Belgium)			LEC2 (France)			LEC3 (France)			Pts
Pos	Driver	R1	R2	R3	R1	R2	R3	R1	R2	R3	R1	R2	R3	R1	R2	R3	R1	R2	R3	R1	R2	R3	Pts
1	(Japan) Ayumu Iwasa	**1**	5	**1**	4	5	3	1	4	1	**1**	3	**1**	1	2	1	2	5	2	**2**	6	**1**	338
2	(Japan) Ren Sato	2	14†	2	**1**	6	**1**	3	3	6	2	1	3	4	1	3	4	4	4	6	4	2	257
3	(France) Isack Hadjar	3	6	Ret	3	9	2	4	2	4	Ret	2	2	3	Ret	4	**1**	3	**1**	1	5	6	233
4	(France) Sami Meguetounif	5	9	11†	2	4	4	8	10	Ret	3	12†	5	**2**	3	**2**	8	1	3	3	Ret	4	183
5	(Germany) Valentino Catalano	8	2	7	6	7	7	6	5	3	4	5	6	6	6	5	3	6	6	8	3	10	144
6	(Mexico) Rafael Villagómez	6	4	5	14†	10	5	5	6	7	6	6	4	5	4	9				7	2	5	121
7	(Singapore) Romain Leroux	Ret	10	3	8	3	9	10	1	5	5	10	8	7	8	13	7	2	5	Ret	7	3	116
8	(Netherlands) Marijn Kremers	4	7	4	5	8	6	**2**	Ret	**2**				9	Ret	6	6	7	8	5	8	DNS	110
9	(France) Loris Cabirou	9	8	12†	7	2	8	7	7	8	9	4	7	8	5	7	12†*	10	9	9	1	9	94
10	(Ukraine) Ivan Peklin	7	3	6	9	1	11	9	Ret	13†	7	11	10	10	12	12	9	9	11	12	12	12	53
11	(Russia) Lev Lomko	10	1	13†	13†	11	14	11	8	10				Ret	10	8	13	11	7				28
12	(France) Owen Tangavelou	12	13	9	10	Ret	12	Ret	9	9	10	Ret	9	DNS	11	10	5	8	13	10	9	7	28
13	(France) Daniël Ligier	13	11	8	11	13	10	Ret	12	11	12	7	11	12	9	14	10	13	12	11	10	11	10
14	(France) Noah Andy	11	12	10	12	12	13	12	11	12	11	9	13	11	7	11	11	12	10	13	13†	13	6
Guest drivers ineligible to score points
	(France) Esteban Masson																			4	11	8	
	(France) Étienne Cheli										8	8	12										
	(India) Yash Aradhya										13	Ret	14										
Pos	Driver	R1	R2	R3	R1	R2	R3	R1	R2	R3	R1	R2	R3	R1	R2	R3	R1	R2	R3	R1	R2	R3	Pts
Pos	Driver	NOG (France)			MAG (France)			ZAN (Netherlands)			LEC1 (France)			SPA (Belgium)			LEC2 (France)			LEC3 (France)			Pts

Colour	Result
Gold	Winner
Silver	Second place
Bronze	Third place
Green	Points classification
Blue	Non-points classification
Blue	Non-classified finish (NC)
Purple	Retired, not classified (Ret)
Red	Did not qualify (DNQ)
Red	Did not pre-qualify (DNPQ)
Black	Disqualified (DSQ)
White	Did not start (DNS)
White	Withdrew (WD)
White	Race cancelled (C)
Blank	Did not practice (DNP)
Blank	Did not arrive (DNA)
Blank	Excluded (EX)

**Bold** – Pole
Italics – Fastest Lap
† — Did not finish but classified

=== Drivers' standings – FIA Formula 4 ===
Pos	Driver	NOG (France)			MAG (France)			ZAN (Netherlands)			LEC1 (France)			SPA (Belgium)			LEC2 (France)			LEC3 (France)			Pts
Pos	Driver	R1	R2	R3	R1	R2	R3	R1	R2	R3	R1	R2	R3	R1	R2	R3	R1	R2	R3	R1	R2	R3	Pts
1	(Japan) Ayumu Iwasa	1	4	1	4	5	3	1	4	1	1	3	1	1	2	1	2	5	2	2	5	1	329
2	(Japan) Ren Sato	2	Ret	2	1	6	1	3	3	5	2	1	3	4	1	3	3	4	4	5	3	2	253
3	(France) Isack Hadjar	3	5	Ret	3	8	2	4	2	3	Ret	2	2	3	Ret	4	1	3	1	1	4	6	231
4	(France) Sami Meguetounif	5	8	Ret	2	4	4	7	9	Ret	3	Ret	5	2	3	2	7	1	3	3	Ret	4	183
5	(Singapore) Romain Leroux	Ret	9	3	7	3	8	9	1	4	4	7	7	6	7	12	6	2	5	Ret	6	3	133
6	(Mexico) Rafael Villagómez	6	3	5	Ret	9	5	5	5	6	5	5	4	5	4	8				6	2	5	132
7	(Netherlands) Marijn Kremers	4	6	4	5	7	6	2	Ret	2				8	Ret	5	5	6	7	4	7	DNS	118
8	(France) Loris Cabirou	8	7	Ret	6	2	7	6	6	7	7	4	6	7	5	6	10	9	8	7	1	8	117
9	(Ukraine) Ivan Peklin	7	2	6	8	1	9	8	Ret	Ret	6	8	9	9	10	11	8	8	10	9	9	9	72
10	(France) Owen Tangavelou	11	11	7	9	Ret	10	Ret	8	8	8	Ret	8	DNS	9	9	4	7	11	8	8	7	47
11	(Russia) Lev Lomko	9	1	Ret	Ret	10	12	10	7	9				Ret	8	7	11	10	6				37
12	(France) Noah Andy	10	10	8	10	11	11	11	10	10	9	6	10	10	6	10	9	11	9	10	Ret	10	25
Pos	Driver	R1	R2	R3	R1	R2	R3	R1	R2	R3	R1	R2	R3	R1	R2	R3	R1	R2	R3	R1	R2	R3	Pts
Pos	Driver	NOG (France)			MAG (France)			ZAN (Netherlands)			LEC1 (France)			SPA (Belgium)			LEC2 (France)			LEC3 (France)			Pts

=== Juniors' standings ===
Pos	Driver	NOG (France)			MAG (France)			ZAN (Netherlands)			LEC1 (France)			SPA (Belgium)			LEC2 (France)			LEC3 (France)			Pts
Pos	Driver	R1	R2	R3	R1	R2	R3	R1	R2	R3	R1	R2	R3	R1	R2	R3	R1	R2	R3	R1	R2	R3	Pts
1	(Germany) Valentino Catalano	1	1	1	1	1	1	1	1	1	1	1	1	1	1	1	1	1	1	1	1	1	390
2	(France) Daniël Ligier	2	2	2	2	2	2	Ret	Ret	2	2	2	2	2	2	2	2	2	2	2	2	2	288
Pos	Driver	R1	R2	R3	R1	R2	R3	R1	R2	R3	R1	R2	R3	R1	R2	R3	R1	R2	R3	R1	R2	R3	Pts
Pos	Driver	NOG (France)			MAG (France)			ZAN (Netherlands)			LEC1 (France)			SPA (Belgium)			LEC2 (France)			LEC3 (France)			Pts
