= French F4 Championship =

Single-seater racing championship

- Category: FIA Formula 4
- Country: France
- Region: Europe
- Inaugural season: 1993
- Teams: 1
- Constructors: Mygale
- Engine suppliers: Renault 1330cc
- Tyre suppliers: Pirelli
- Drivers' champion: (France) Alexandre Munoz
- Official website: Official website

French F4 Championship, formerly known as Formula Renault Campus France, Formula Campus, Formul'Academy Euro Series, F4 Eurocup 1.6 is a form of open wheel racing founded in 1993 by Louis Drouet. It is based in France and aims at karting graduates. The series currently organized by the Fédération Française du Sport Automobile (FFSA). Formerly, the champion receives support to continue in one of the Formula Renault 2.0 championships. In 2010, the re-branded series was made part of the World Series by Renault, but was then dropped for 2011. Since 2018, the series runs under FIA moniker.

== The car ==
The car was originally built by Signatech. The chassis and survival cell had a carbon fibre composite monocoque construction. The car was designed to comply with the 2008 FIA F3 standards. The 1600cc Renault K4MRS engine produced about 140 bhp. The transmission had five forward speeds with sequential shift mechanism.

The championship adopted FIA Formula 4 regulations in 2018, with Mygale M14-F4 chassis and naturally-aspirated 160 bhp Renault 2.0L engines. In 2020, the engine was changed to the new turbo charged Renault Sport 1.3-liter one. Since the 2022 season, the new Mygale M21-F4 chassis has been used.

== Regulations ==
- The event schedule usually takes place over three days (normally Friday to Sunday) with free practice sessions on the first day. The qualifying session determines the starting order for first race and the second fastest time the grid for the third race. The grid for the second race is set by reversing the top ten finishers of the first race. All races lasts 20 minutes + 1 lap.
- Tyres allocated to each driver in sets of 4 at each meeting of competition.
- Points are awarded to the first ten finishers of each race in the following order:

Points are awarded as follows:

Races	Position										Bonus	
Races	1st	2nd	3rd	4th	5th	6th	7th	8th	9th	10th	PP	FL
Races 1 & 3	25	18	15	12	10	8	6	4	2	1	1	1
Race 2	15	12	10	8	6	4	2	1			–	1

== Champions ==
=== Prior French F4 Championship ===
Season	Champion
Formula Campus by Renault and Elf
1993	(France) Sébastien Philippe
1994	(France) Franck Montagny
1995	(France) Renaud Malinconi
1996	(France) Philippe Bénoliel
1997	(Spain) Marcel Costa
1998	(United Kingdom) Westley Barber
1999	(United Kingdom) Adam Jones
2000	(France) Stéphane Morat
2001	(France) Bruce Lorgeré-Roux
2002	(France) Loïc Duval
2003	(France) Laurent Groppi
2004	(France) Jacky Ferré
2005	(France) Jean Karl Vernay
2006	(France) Kévin Estre
2007	(France) Jean-Éric Vergne
Formul'Academy Euro Series
2008	(France) Arthur Pic
2009	(Belgium) Benjamin Bailly
F4 Eurocup 1.6
2010	(Belgium) Stoffel Vandoorne

=== French F4 Championship ===
Season	Champion	Secondary Class Champion
2011	(France) Matthieu Vaxivière	not held
2012	(France) Alexandre Baron	not held
2013	(France) Anthoine Hubert	not held
2014	(Denmark) Lasse Sørensen	J: (France) Dorian Boccolacci; I: (Denmark) Lasse Sørensen
2015	(France) Valentin Moineault	J: (France) Sacha Fenestraz; I: (France) Valentin Moineault
2016	(China) Yifei Ye	J: (China) Yifei Ye; I: (Belgium) Gilles Magnus
2017	(France) Arthur Rougier	J: (France) Victor Martins; I: (France) Arthur Rougier

=== FIA French F4 Championship ===
Season	Champion	Races	Poles	Wins	Podiums	Fastest laps	Points	Margin	Secondary Class Champion
2018	(Brazil) Caio Collet	21	7	7	10	7	296.5	86	J: (France) Théo Pourchaire; I: (Brazil) Caio Collet
2019	(France) Hadrien David	21	10	7	14	8	281	47.5	J: (France) Victor Bernier; I: (France) Hadrien David
2020	(Japan) Ayumu Iwasa	21	6	9	15	7	338	81	J: (Germany) Valentino Catalano; I: (Japan) Ayumu Iwasa
2021	(France) Esteban Masson	20	9	6	11	5	236	23	J: (France) Alessandro Giusti; I: (France) Esteban Masson
2022	(France) Alessandro Giusti	20	6	5	12	2	300	59	not held
2023	(France) Evan Giltaire	21	8	6	13	8	317	4	not held
2024	(Japan) Taito Kato	20	4	5	12	5	280	6	not held
2025	(France) Alexandre Munoz	17	4	5	9	6	247	61	not held

== Circuits ==
From 2011, the circuits used in the French F4 Championship are listed as:

- **Bold** denotes a circuit was used in the 2026 season.
- **Italic** denotes a future circuit will be used in the 2027 season.

Number	Circuits	Rounds	Years
1	(France) **Circuit Paul Ricard**	17 (Note: Circuit Paul Ricard hosted 3 rounds in 2020.)	2011–2024, 2026
2	(France) **Circuit de Nevers Magny-Cours**	16 (Note: Circuit de Nevers Magny-Cours hosted 2 rounds in 2021.)	2012–present
3	(France) **Circuit de Lédenon**	12	2011–2013, 2015–2016, 2019, 2021–present
3	(France) **Circuit Paul Armagnac**	12	2011, 2014, 2017–present
5	(France) Circuit de Pau-Ville	11	2011–2019, 2022–2023
5	(Belgium) **Circuit de Spa-Francorchamps**	11	2011, 2013, 2017–2020, 2022–2026
7	(France) Bugatti Circuit	6	2012–2016, 2025
8	(France) Circuit du Val de Vienne	4	2011–2014
8	(France) **Dijon-Prenois**	4	2018, 2024–present
10	(Hungary) Hungaroring	3	2015, 2019, 2021
11	(Spain) Circuito de Navarra	2	2012, 2015
11	(Spain) Circuito de Jerez	2	2014, 2018
11	(Spain) **Circuit de Barcelona-Catalunya**	2	2016–2017, 2027
11	(Italy) Monza Circuit	2	2017, 2021
15	(France) Circuit d'Albi	1	2011
15	(Netherlands) Circuit Zandvoort	1	2020
15	(Spain) Circuit Ricardo Tormo	1	2022
15	(Italy) Misano World Circuit	1	2023
15	(Germany) Nürburgring	1	2024
