= 2026 Petit Le Mans =

Sportscar endurance race in Georgia, US

The layout of Road Atlanta, where the race took place

The 2026 Petit Le Mans (officially known as the 2026 Motul Petit Le Mans) was a sports car race held at Road Atlanta in Braselton, Georgia, on October 4, 2026. It was the eleventh and final round of the 2026 IMSA SportsCar Championship, as well as the fifth and final round of the Michelin Endurance Cup. The event was the 29th running of the Petit Le Mans since its inception.

== Qualifying ==
Friday's afternoon qualifying was broken into four sessions, with one session for the GTP, LMP2, GTD Pro, and GTD classes each. The rules dictated that all teams nominated a driver to qualify their cars, with the Pro-Am LMP2 class requiring a Bronze rated driver to qualify the car. The competitors' fastest lap times determined the starting order. The competitors' fastest lap times determined the starting order. IMSA then arranged the grid to put GTPs ahead of the LMP2, GTD Pro, and GTD cars.

=== Qualifying results ===
Pole positions in each class are indicated in bold and with ‡.

== Race ==
=== Race results ===
Class winners are denoted in bold and with ‡.

| Pos | Class | No | Team | Drivers | Chassis | Laps | Time/Retired |
| Pos | Class | No | Team | Drivers | Engine | Laps | Time/Retired |
|---|---|---|---|---|---|---|---|
| 1 | **GTP** | **6** | **(Germany) Porsche Penske Motorsport** | **(Australia) Matt Campbell (France) Kévin Estre (Belgium) Laurens Vanthoor** | **Porsche 963** | **368** | **10:00:50.625‡** |
| 1 | **GTP** | **6** | **(Germany) Porsche Penske Motorsport** | **(Australia) Matt Campbell (France) Kévin Estre (Belgium) Laurens Vanthoor** | **Porsche 9RD 4.6 L Turbo V8** | **368** | **10:00:50.625‡** |
| 2 | GTP | 24 | (Belgium) BMW M Team WRT | (Netherlands) Robin Frijns (South Africa) Sheldon van der Linde (Belgium) Dries Vanthoor | BMW M Hybrid V8 | 368 | +1.205 |
| 2 | GTP | 24 | (Belgium) BMW M Team WRT | (Netherlands) Robin Frijns (South Africa) Sheldon van der Linde (Belgium) Dries Vanthoor | BMW P66/3 4.0 L Turbo V8 | 368 | +1.205 |
| 3 | GTP | 40 | (United States) Cadillac Wayne Taylor Racing | (Switzerland) Louis Delétraz (United States) Colton Herta (United States) Jordan Taylor | Cadillac V-Series.R | 368 | +8.630 |
| 3 | GTP | 40 | (United States) Cadillac Wayne Taylor Racing | (Switzerland) Louis Delétraz (United States) Colton Herta (United States) Jordan Taylor | Cadillac LMC55R 5.5 L V8 | 368 | +8.630 |
| 4 | GTP | 10 | (United States) Cadillac Wayne Taylor Racing | (Portugal) Filipe Albuquerque (United Kingdom) Will Stevens (United States) Ricky Taylor | Cadillac V-Series.R | 368 | +9.266 |
| 4 | GTP | 10 | (United States) Cadillac Wayne Taylor Racing | (Portugal) Filipe Albuquerque (United Kingdom) Will Stevens (United States) Ricky Taylor | Cadillac LMC55R 5.5 L V8 | 368 | +9.266 |
| 5 | GTP | 23 | (United States) Aston Martin THOR Team | (Canada) Roman De Angelis (United Kingdom) Ross Gunn (Spain) Alex Riberas | Aston Martin Valkyrie | 368 | +31.466 |
| 5 | GTP | 23 | (United States) Aston Martin THOR Team | (Canada) Roman De Angelis (United Kingdom) Ross Gunn (Spain) Alex Riberas | Aston Martin RA 6.5 L V12 | 368 | +31.466 |
| 6 | GTP | 60 | (United States) Meyer Shank Racing with Curb-Agajanian | (United Kingdom) Tom Blomqvist (United States) Colin Braun (New Zealand) Scott Dixon | Acura ARX-06 | 368 | +42.082 |
| 6 | GTP | 60 | (United States) Meyer Shank Racing with Curb-Agajanian | (United Kingdom) Tom Blomqvist (United States) Colin Braun (New Zealand) Scott Dixon | Acura AR24e 2.4 L Turbo V6 | 368 | +42.082 |
| 7 | **LMP2** | **04** | **(Portugal) CrowdStrike Racing by APR** | **(United States) George Kurtz (United Kingdom) Alex Quinn (United Kingdom) Toby Sowery** | **Oreca 07** | **362** | **+6 Laps‡** |
| 7 | **LMP2** | **04** | **(Portugal) CrowdStrike Racing by APR** | **(United States) George Kurtz (United Kingdom) Alex Quinn (United Kingdom) Toby Sowery** | **Gibson GK428 4.2 L V8** | **362** | **+6 Laps‡** |
| 8 | LMP2 | 43 | (Poland) Inter Europol Competition | (United States) Jeremy Clarke (France) Tom Dillmann (United States) Bijoy Garg | Oreca 07 | 362 | +6 Laps |
| 8 | LMP2 | 43 | (Poland) Inter Europol Competition | (United States) Jeremy Clarke (France) Tom Dillmann (United States) Bijoy Garg | Gibson GK428 4.2 L V8 | 362 | +6 Laps |
| 9 | LMP2 | 18 | (United States) Era Motorsport | (United States) Jacob Abel (Austria) Ferdinand Habsburg (United States) Naveen Rao | Oreca 07 | 362 | +6 Laps |
| 9 | LMP2 | 18 | (United States) Era Motorsport | (United States) Jacob Abel (Austria) Ferdinand Habsburg (United States) Naveen Rao | Gibson GK428 4.2 L V8 | 362 | +6 Laps |
| 10 | LMP2 | 8 | (Canada) Tower Motorsports | (Mexico) Sebastián Álvarez (Canada) John Farano (France) Tristan Vautier | Oreca 07 | 362 | +6 Laps |
| 10 | LMP2 | 8 | (Canada) Tower Motorsports | (Mexico) Sebastián Álvarez (Canada) John Farano (France) Tristan Vautier | Gibson GK428 4.2 L V8 | 362 | +6 Laps |
| 11 DNF | LMP2 | 73 | (United States) Pratt Miller Motorsports | (Canada) Chris Cumming (Portugal) Manuel Espírito Santo (Brazil) Pietro Fittipaldi | Oreca 07 | 362 | |
| 11 DNF | LMP2 | 73 | (United States) Pratt Miller Motorsports | (Canada) Chris Cumming (Portugal) Manuel Espírito Santo (Brazil) Pietro Fittipaldi | Gibson GK428 4.2 L V8 | 362 | |
| 12 | LMP2 | 22 | (United States) United Autosports USA | (United Kingdom) Paul di Resta (United States) Dan Goldburg (Sweden) Rasmus Lindh | Oreca 07 | 361 | +8 Laps |
| 12 | LMP2 | 22 | (United States) United Autosports USA | (United Kingdom) Paul di Resta (United States) Dan Goldburg (Sweden) Rasmus Lindh | Gibson GK428 4.2 L V8 | 361 | +8 Laps |
| 13 | LMP2 | 37 | (United States) Intersport Racing | (United States) Jon Field (United Kingdom) Oliver Jarvis (Netherlands) Max van der Snel | Oreca 07 | 360 | +8 Laps |
| 13 | LMP2 | 37 | (United States) Intersport Racing | (United States) Jon Field (United Kingdom) Oliver Jarvis (Netherlands) Max van der Snel | Gibson GK428 4.2 L V8 | 360 | +8 Laps |
| 14 | LMP2 | 52 | (United States) Bryan Herta Autosport with PR1/Mathiasen | (Canada) Misha Goikhberg (Canada) Parker Thompson (United Kingdom) Harry Tincknell | Oreca 07 | 360 | +9 Laps |
| 14 | LMP2 | 52 | (United States) Bryan Herta Autosport with PR1/Mathiasen | (Canada) Misha Goikhberg (Canada) Parker Thompson (United Kingdom) Harry Tincknell | Gibson GK428 4.2 L V8 | 360 | +9 Laps |
| 15 DNF | LMP2 | 2 | (United States) United Autosports USA | (Canada) Phil Fayer (Denmark) Mikkel Jensen (New Zealand) Hunter McElrea | Oreca 07 | 359 | |
| 15 DNF | LMP2 | 2 | (United States) United Autosports USA | (Canada) Phil Fayer (Denmark) Mikkel Jensen (New Zealand) Hunter McElrea | Gibson GK428 4.2 L V8 | 359 | |
| 16 | GTP | 31 | (United States) Cadillac Whelen | (United Kingdom) Jack Aitken (New Zealand) Earl Bamber (Denmark) Frederik Vesti | Cadillac V-Series.R | 356 | +19 Laps |
| 16 | GTP | 31 | (United States) Cadillac Whelen | (United Kingdom) Jack Aitken (New Zealand) Earl Bamber (Denmark) Frederik Vesti | Cadillac LMC55R 5.5 L V8 | 356 | +19 Laps |
| 17 | **GTD Pro** | **68** | **(United States) Car Blanche** | **(France) Valentin Hasse-Clot (Denmark) Marco Sørensen (Italy) Mattia Drudi** | **Aston Martin Vantage AMR GT3 Evo** | **349** | **+19 Laps‡** |
| 17 | **GTD Pro** | **68** | **(United States) Car Blanche** | **(France) Valentin Hasse-Clot (Denmark) Marco Sørensen (Italy) Mattia Drudi** | **Aston Martin AMR16A 4.0 L Turbo V8** | **349** | **+19 Laps‡** |
| 18 | GTD Pro | 77 | (United States) AO Racing | (United Kingdom) Harry King (Belgium) Alessio Picariello (United Kingdom) Nick Tandy | Porsche 911 GT3 R (992.2) | 349 | +19 Laps |
| 18 | GTD Pro | 77 | (United States) AO Racing | (United Kingdom) Harry King (Belgium) Alessio Picariello (United Kingdom) Nick Tandy | Porsche M97/80 4.2 L Flat-6 | 349 | +19 Laps |
| 19 | GTD Pro | 1 | (United States) Paul Miller Racing | (United States) Connor De Phillippi (United Kingdom) Dan Harper (United States) Neil Verhagen | BMW M4 GT3 Evo | 349 | +19 Laps |
| 19 | GTD Pro | 1 | (United States) Paul Miller Racing | (United States) Connor De Phillippi (United Kingdom) Dan Harper (United States) Neil Verhagen | BMW P58 3.0 L Turbo I6 | 349 | +19 Laps |
| 20 | GTD Pro | 9 | (Canada) Pfaff Motorsports | (Italy) Andrea Caldarelli (United Kingdom) Sandy Mitchell (France) Franck Perera | Lamborghini Temerario GT3 | 349 | +19 Laps |
| 20 | GTD Pro | 9 | (Canada) Pfaff Motorsports | (Italy) Andrea Caldarelli (United Kingdom) Sandy Mitchell (France) Franck Perera | Lamborghini L411 4.0 L Turbo V8 | 349 | +19 Laps |
| 21 | GTD Pro | 62 | (United States) Risi Competizione | (Italy) Alessandro Pier Guidi (Italy) Davide Rigon (Brazil) Daniel Serra | Ferrari 296 GT3 Evo | 349 | +19 Laps |
| 21 | GTD Pro | 62 | (United States) Risi Competizione | (Italy) Alessandro Pier Guidi (Italy) Davide Rigon (Brazil) Daniel Serra | Ferrari F163CE 3.0 L Turbo V6 | 349 | +19 Laps |
| 22 | GTD Pro | 74 | (United States) DragonSpeed | (Italy) Giacomo Altoè (France) Sébastien Bourdais (United Kingdom) Casper Stevenson | Chevrolet Corvette Z06 GT3.R | 349 | +19 Laps |
| 22 | GTD Pro | 74 | (United States) DragonSpeed | (Italy) Giacomo Altoè (France) Sébastien Bourdais (United Kingdom) Casper Stevenson | Chevrolet LT6.R 5.5 L V8 | 349 | +19 Laps |
| 23 DNF | GTD Pro | 911 | (Germany) Manthey Racing | (Austria) Klaus Bachler (France) Mathieu Jaminet (Austria) Thomas Preining | Porsche 911 GT3 R (992.2) | 349 | |
| 23 DNF | GTD Pro | 911 | (Germany) Manthey Racing | (Austria) Klaus Bachler (France) Mathieu Jaminet (Austria) Thomas Preining | Porsche M97/80 4.2 L Flat-6 | 349 | |
| 24 | GTD Pro | 3 | (United States) Corvette Racing by Pratt Miller Motorsports | (Spain) Antonio García (Germany) Marvin Kirchhöfer (United Kingdom) Alexander Sims | Chevrolet Corvette Z06 GT3.R | 349 | +19 Laps |
| 24 | GTD Pro | 3 | (United States) Corvette Racing by Pratt Miller Motorsports | (Spain) Antonio García (Germany) Marvin Kirchhöfer (United Kingdom) Alexander Sims | Chevrolet LT6.R 5.5 L V8 | 349 | +19 Laps |
| 25 | GTD Pro | 64 | (United States) Ford Racing | (United Kingdom) Ben Barker (Norway) Dennis Olsen (Germany) Mike Rockenfeller | Ford Mustang GT3 Evo | 349 | +19 Laps |
| 25 | GTD Pro | 64 | (United States) Ford Racing | (United Kingdom) Ben Barker (Norway) Dennis Olsen (Germany) Mike Rockenfeller | Ford Coyote 5.4 L V8 | 349 | +19 Laps |
| 26 | GTD Pro | 14 | (United States) Vasser Sullivan Racing | (United Kingdom) Ben Barnicoat (United Kingdom) Jack Hawksworth (United States) Kyle Kirkwood | Lexus RC F GT3 | 349 | +19 Laps |
| 26 | GTD Pro | 14 | (United States) Vasser Sullivan Racing | (United Kingdom) Ben Barnicoat (United Kingdom) Jack Hawksworth (United States) Kyle Kirkwood | Toyota 2UR-GSE 5.4 L V8 | 349 | +19 Laps |
| 27 | GTD Pro | 65 | (United States) Ford Racing | (Germany) Christopher Mies (United Kingdom) Sebastian Priaulx (Belgium) Frédéric Vervisch | Ford Mustang GT3 Evo | 349 | +19 Laps |
| 27 | GTD Pro | 65 | (United States) Ford Racing | (Germany) Christopher Mies (United Kingdom) Sebastian Priaulx (Belgium) Frédéric Vervisch | Ford Coyote 5.4 L V8 | 349 | +19 Laps |
| 28 | GTD Pro | 4 | (United States) Corvette Racing by Pratt Miller Motorsports | (Netherlands) Nicky Catsburg (United States) Tommy Milner (Argentina) Nicolás Varrone | Chevrolet Corvette Z06 GT3.R | 348 | +20 Laps |
| 28 | GTD Pro | 4 | (United States) Corvette Racing by Pratt Miller Motorsports | (Netherlands) Nicky Catsburg (United States) Tommy Milner (Argentina) Nicolás Varrone | Chevrolet LT6.R 5.5 L V8 | 348 | +20 Laps |
| 29 | **GTD** | **57** | **(United States) Winward Racing** | **(Netherlands) Indy Dontje (Switzerland) Philip Ellis (United States) Russell Ward** | **Mercedes-AMG GT3 Evo** | **346** | **+22 Laps‡** |
| 29 | **GTD** | **57** | **(United States) Winward Racing** | **(Netherlands) Indy Dontje (Switzerland) Philip Ellis (United States) Russell Ward** | **Mercedes-AMG M159 6.2 L V8** | **346** | **+22 Laps‡** |
| 30 | GTD | 912 | (Germany) Manthey 1st Phorm | (United States) Ryan Hardwick (Italy) Riccardo Pera (Netherlands) Morris Schuring | Porsche 911 GT3 R (992.2) | 346 | +22 Laps |
| 30 | GTD | 912 | (Germany) Manthey 1st Phorm | (United States) Ryan Hardwick (Italy) Riccardo Pera (Netherlands) Morris Schuring | Porsche M97/80 4.2 L Flat-6 | 346 | +22 Laps |
| 31 | GTD | 36 | (United States) DXDT Racing | (Republic of Ireland) Charlie Eastwood (United States) Mason Filippi (Turkey) Salih Yoluç | Chevrolet Corvette Z06 GT3.R | 346 | +22 Laps |
| 31 | GTD | 36 | (United States) DXDT Racing | (Republic of Ireland) Charlie Eastwood (United States) Mason Filippi (Turkey) Salih Yoluç | Chevrolet LT6.R 5.5 L V8 | 346 | +22 Laps |
| 32 | GTD | 80 | (United States) Lone Star Racing | (Germany) Luca Stolz (Netherlands) Lin Hodenius (Republic of Ireland) James Roe | Mercedes-AMG GT3 Evo | 346 | +22 Laps |
| 32 | GTD | 80 | (United States) Lone Star Racing | (Germany) Luca Stolz (Netherlands) Lin Hodenius (Republic of Ireland) James Roe | Mercedes-AMG M159 6.2 L V8 | 346 | +22 Laps |
| 33 | GTD | 44 | (United States) Magnus Racing | (United States) John Potter (United States) Spencer Pumpelly (Germany) Mario Farnbacher | Aston Martin Vantage AMR GT3 Evo | 346 | +22 Laps |
| 33 | GTD | 44 | (United States) Magnus Racing | (United States) John Potter (United States) Spencer Pumpelly (Germany) Mario Farnbacher | Aston Martin AMR16A 4.0 L Turbo V8 | 346 | +22 Laps |
| 34 | GTD | 21 | (Italy) AF Corse USA | (Italy) Antonio Fuoco (United States) Simon Mann (France) Lilou Wadoux | Ferrari 296 GT3 Evo | 346 | +22 Laps |
| 34 | GTD | 21 | (Italy) AF Corse USA | (Italy) Antonio Fuoco (United States) Simon Mann (France) Lilou Wadoux | Ferrari F163CE 3.0 L Turbo V6 | 346 | +22 Laps |
| 35 | GTD | 120 | (United States) Wright Motorsports | (United States) Adam Adelson (United Kingdom) Callum Ilott (Australia) Tom Sargent | Porsche 911 GT3 R (992.2) | 346 | +22 Laps |
| 35 | GTD | 120 | (United States) Wright Motorsports | (United States) Adam Adelson (United Kingdom) Callum Ilott (Australia) Tom Sargent | Porsche M97/80 4.2 L Flat-6 | 346 | +22 Laps |
| 36 | GTD | 70 | (United Kingdom) Inception Racing | (United States) Brendan Iribe (Spain) Fran Rueda (Denmark) Frederik Schandorff | Ferrari 296 GT3 Evo | 346 | +22 Laps |
| 36 | GTD | 70 | (United Kingdom) Inception Racing | (United States) Brendan Iribe (Spain) Fran Rueda (Denmark) Frederik Schandorff | Ferrari F163CE 3.0 L Turbo V6 | 346 | +22 Laps |
| 37 | GTD | 023 | (United States) Triarsi Competizione | (United States) Kenton Koch (United States) Robert Megennis (United States) Onofrio Triarsi | Ferrari 296 GT3 Evo | 346 | +22 Laps |
| 37 | GTD | 023 | (United States) Triarsi Competizione | (United States) Kenton Koch (United States) Robert Megennis (United States) Onofrio Triarsi | Ferrari F163CE 3.0 L Turbo V6 | 346 | +22 Laps |
| 38 | GTD | 13 | (Canada) 13 Autosport | (United Kingdom) Matt Bell (Canada) Orey Fidani (Germany) Lars Kern | Chevrolet Corvette Z06 GT3.R | 346 | +22 Laps |
| 38 | GTD | 13 | (Canada) 13 Autosport | (United Kingdom) Matt Bell (Canada) Orey Fidani (Germany) Lars Kern | Chevrolet LT6.R 5.5 L V8 | 346 | +22 Laps |
| 39 | LMP2 | 99 | (United States) AO Racing | (United States) Dane Cameron (United Kingdom) Jonny Edgar (United States) P. J. Hyett | Oreca 07 | 341 | +27 Laps |
| 39 | LMP2 | 99 | (United States) AO Racing | (United States) Dane Cameron (United Kingdom) Jonny Edgar (United States) P. J. Hyett | Gibson GK428 4.2 L V8 | 341 | +27 Laps |
| 40 | GTD | 12 | (United States) Vasser Sullivan Racing | (United States) Frankie Montecalvo (Denmark) Benjamin Pedersen (United States) Aaron Telitz | Lexus RC F GT3 | 339 | +29 Laps |
| 40 | GTD | 12 | (United States) Vasser Sullivan Racing | (United States) Frankie Montecalvo (Denmark) Benjamin Pedersen (United States) Aaron Telitz | Toyota 2UR-GSE 5.4 L V8 | 339 | +29 Laps |
| 41 DNF | GTP | 7 | (Germany) Porsche Penske Motorsport | (France) Julien Andlauer (Germany) Laurin Heinrich (Brazil) Felipe Nasr | Porsche 963 | 308 | |
| 41 DNF | GTP | 7 | (Germany) Porsche Penske Motorsport | (France) Julien Andlauer (Germany) Laurin Heinrich (Brazil) Felipe Nasr | Porsche 9RD 4.6 L Turbo V8 | 308 | |
| 42 DNF | GTD | 28 | (United States) RS1 | (Belgium) Jan Heylen (Canada) Zachary Vanier (New Zealand) Ryan Yardley | Porsche 911 GT3 R (992.2) | 293 | |
| 42 DNF | GTD | 28 | (United States) RS1 | (Belgium) Jan Heylen (Canada) Zachary Vanier (New Zealand) Ryan Yardley | Porsche M97/80 4.2 L Flat-6 | 293 | |
| 43 DNF | GTP | 5 | (United States) JDC-Miller MotorSports | (United States) Kaylen Frederick (Switzerland) Nico Müller (Netherlands) Tijmen van der Helm | Porsche 963 | 290 | |
| 43 DNF | GTP | 5 | (United States) JDC-Miller MotorSports | (United States) Kaylen Frederick (Switzerland) Nico Müller (Netherlands) Tijmen van der Helm | Porsche 9RD 4.6 L Turbo V8 | 290 | |
| 44 DNF | GTP | 93 | (United States) Meyer Shank Racing with Curb-Agajanian | (Spain) Álex Palou (Netherlands) Renger van der Zande (United Kingdom) Nick Yelloly | Acura ARX-06 | 257 | |
| 44 DNF | GTP | 93 | (United States) Meyer Shank Racing with Curb-Agajanian | (Spain) Álex Palou (Netherlands) Renger van der Zande (United Kingdom) Nick Yelloly | Acura AR24e 2.4 L Turbo V6 | 257 | |
| 45 DNF | GTD | 34 | (United States) Conquest Racing | (Spain) Albert Costa (United States) Alec Udell (Italy) Lorenzo Patrese | Ferrari 296 GT3 Evo | 256 | |
| 45 DNF | GTD | 34 | (United States) Conquest Racing | (Spain) Albert Costa (United States) Alec Udell (Italy) Lorenzo Patrese | Ferrari F163CE 3.0 L Turbo V6 | 256 | |
| 46 DNF | GTD Pro | 033 | (United States) Triarsi Competizione | (Italy) Riccardo Agostini (United Kingdom) James Calado (Spain) Miguel Molina | Ferrari 296 GT3 Evo | 251 | |
| 46 DNF | GTD Pro | 033 | (United States) Triarsi Competizione | (Italy) Riccardo Agostini (United Kingdom) James Calado (Spain) Miguel Molina | Ferrari F163CE 3.0 L Turbo V6 | 251 | |
| 47 DNF | GTD Pro | 59 | (United States) RLL Team McLaren | (United States) Max Esterson (United States) Nikita Johnson (Germany) Benjamin Goethe | McLaren 720S GT3 Evo | 181 | |
| 47 DNF | GTD Pro | 59 | (United States) RLL Team McLaren | (United States) Max Esterson (United States) Nikita Johnson (Germany) Benjamin Goethe | McLaren M840T 4.0 L Turbo V8 | 181 | |
| 48 DNF | GTP | 25 | (Belgium) BMW M Team WRT | (Austria) Philipp Eng (Denmark) Kevin Magnussen (Germany) Marco Wittmann | BMW M Hybrid V8 | 161 | |
| 48 DNF | GTP | 25 | (Belgium) BMW M Team WRT | (Austria) Philipp Eng (Denmark) Kevin Magnussen (Germany) Marco Wittmann | BMW P66/3 4.0 L Turbo V8 | 161 | |
| 49 DNF | GTD | 16 | (United States) Myers Riley Motorsports | (United States) Jenson Altzman (Brazil) Felipe Fraga (United States) Sheena Monk | Ford Mustang GT3 Evo | 159 | |
| 49 DNF | GTD | 16 | (United States) Myers Riley Motorsports | (United States) Jenson Altzman (Brazil) Felipe Fraga (United States) Sheena Monk | Ford Coyote 5.4 L V8 | 159 | |
| 50 DNF | GTD | 66 | (United States) Gradient Racing | (United Kingdom) Till Bechtolsheimer (United States) Joey Hand (United States) Jake Walker | Ford Mustang GT3 Evo | 159 | |
| 50 DNF | GTD | 66 | (United States) Gradient Racing | (United Kingdom) Till Bechtolsheimer (United States) Joey Hand (United States) Jake Walker | Ford Coyote 5.4 L V8 | 159 | |
| 51 DNF | LMP2 | 11 | (France) TDS Racing | (Denmark) David Heinemeier Hansson (Canada) Tobias Lütke (Switzerland) Mathias Beche | Oreca 07 | 153 | |
| 51 DNF | LMP2 | 11 | (France) TDS Racing | (Denmark) David Heinemeier Hansson (Canada) Tobias Lütke (Switzerland) Mathias Beche | Gibson GK428 4.2 L V8 | 153 | |
| 52 DNF | GTD | 45 | (United States) Wayne Taylor Racing | (United States) Graham Doyle (Costa Rica) Danny Formal (United States) Trent Hindman | Lamborghini Huracán GT3 Evo 2 | 110 | |
| 52 DNF | GTD | 45 | (United States) Wayne Taylor Racing | (United States) Graham Doyle (Costa Rica) Danny Formal (United States) Trent Hindman | Lamborghini DGF 5.2 L V10 | 110 | |
| 53 DNF | GTD | 27 | (United States) Heart of Racing Team | (Brazil) Eduardo Barrichello (United Kingdom) Tom Gamble (Canada) Zacharie Robichon | Aston Martin Vantage AMR GT3 Evo | 37 | |
| 53 DNF | GTD | 27 | (United States) Heart of Racing Team | (Brazil) Eduardo Barrichello (United Kingdom) Tom Gamble (Canada) Zacharie Robichon | Aston Martin AMR16A 4.0 L Turbo V8 | 37 | |
| 54 DNF | GTD | 96 | (United States) Turner Motorsport | (United States) Robby Foley (United States) Patrick Gallagher (United States) Francis Selldorff | BMW M4 GT3 Evo | 18 | |
| 54 DNF | GTD | 96 | (United States) Turner Motorsport | (United States) Robby Foley (United States) Patrick Gallagher (United States) Francis Selldorff | BMW P58 3.0 L Turbo I6 | 18 | |
Provisional results
