= Ivan Peklin =

Ukrainian racing driver (born 2001)

- Іван Пеклін
- Born: Ivan Peklin; 23 October 2001 (age 25); Kyiv, Ukraine
- Nationality: (Ukraine) Ukrainian

Porsche Sprint Challenge Central Europe career
- Current team: GT Sports Technology
- Categorisation: FIA Silver

Ivan Peklin (Ukrainian: Іван Пеклін; born 23 October 2001) is a Ukrainian racing driver who last competed for GT Sports Technology in the Porsche Sprint Challenge Central Europe.

== Career ==
Peklin began karting at the age of eleven. He won the Ukrainian Karting Championship twice: in the Bezkorobka Junior class in 2015 and in KZ2 in 2017. Internationally, he represented Ukraine in the 2016 Karting Academy Trophy and competed for Maranello Kart and Birel ART in the KZ2 class during his final year of karting in 2018.

After losing a fully-paid seat for the 2020 F4 British Championship to Marijn Kremers in the 2019 FEED Racing Program, Peklin made his single-seater debut with Xcel Motorsport in the Formula 4 UAE Championship trophy round in late 2019. He finished seventh in the only race he contested, and also competed in the final round of the Formula 4 South East Asia Championship at Sepang, achieving a best result of sixth in race one.

In 2020, Peklin competed in the French F4 Championship run by the FFSA Academy for his first full season in single-seaters. He scored his maiden podium in race two at Nogaro. In the next round at Magny-Cours, he became the first Ukrainian to win a single-seater race by taking victory in race two. Peklin struggled to maintain this form in the remaining rounds, with a best finish of seventh and ended the season tenth in the standings.

Peklin moved to International GT Open in 2021, joining Team Lazarus alongside Jordan Pepper. The duo won the season opener at Le Castellet and finished fifth in race two. Lazarus withdrew from the series after this round, leaving Peklin sidelined. In late 2021, Peklin made a one-off appearance in the Italian GT Sprint Championship and was set to contest the 2022 ADAC GT4 Germany season, but the campaign was delayed due to Russia's invasion of Ukraine. He eventually debuted at the season finale at Hockenheimring for PROsport Racing, and also represented Ukraine in the 2022 FIA Motorsport Games GT discipline.

In 2023, Peklin joined Seyffarth Motorsport in the GTC Race series, taking a lone GT4 class win at Oschersleben to finish seventh in the standings. He also made a one-off appearance in TCR Europe at Monza, finishing ninth and 14th in his two races, but did not participate in the following round at Barcelona despite appearing on the entry list. In 2024, Peklin returned to the GTC Race series with Land-Motorsport, driving an Audi R8 LMS GT3. He won at Spa and finished second in the Semi-pro standings. He also represented Ukraine in the FIA Motorsport Games GT discipline, finishing sixth despite an early-race spin. The following year, Peklin raced part-time in Porsche Sprint Challenge Central Europe for GT Sports Technology, in which he won three races and ended the year fourth in points.

== Karting record ==
=== Karting career summary ===
Season	Series	Team	Position
2014	South Garda Winter Cup – KF-J	Energy Corse	NC
2014	IAME International Final – X30 Junior		NC
2015	Ukrainian Karting Championship – Bezkorobka Junior	Victory Racing Team	1st
2016	Karting Academy Trophy	Peklin Oleksandr	41st
2017	Ukrainian Karting Championship – KZ2	Victory Racing Team	1st
2018	South Garda Winter Cup – KZ2	Maranello Kart	NC
2018	Andrea Margutti Trophy – KZ2	Maranello Kart	35th
2018	Deutsche Kart-Meisterschaft – KZ2	Victory Racing Team	16th
2018	Karting European Championship – KZ2	Birel ART Racing	60th
2018	WSK Open Cup – KZ2	Birel ART Racing	26th
2018	International Super Cup – KZ2	Birel ART Racing	NC

== Racing record ==
=== Racing career summary ===
Season	Series	Team	Races	Wins	Poles	F/Laps	Podiums	Points	Position
2019	Formula 4 South East Asia Championship	Meritus.GP	4	0	0	0	0	0	NC†
2019	Formula 4 UAE Championship – Trophy Round	Xcel Motorsport	1	0	0	0	0	—N/a	NC
2020	French F4 Championship	FFSA Academy	21	1	0	0	2	53	10th
2021	International GT Open	Team Lazarus	2	1	0	0	1	21	17th
2021	Italian GT Sprint Championship – GT3 Pro-Am	Vincenzo Sospiri Racing	2	0	0	0	0	11	NC
2022	FIA Motorsport Games GT Cup	Team Ukraine	1	0	0	0	0	—N/a	11th
2022	ADAC GT4 Germany	PROsport Racing	2	0	0	0	0	0	46th
2022	Nürburgring Langstrecken-Serie – V5	PROsport Racing	1	0	0	0	0	0	NC
2023	GTC Race – GT4	Seyffarth Motorsport	4	1	0	0	1	28	7th
2023	TCR Europe Touring Car Series	Volcano Motorsport	2	0	0	0	0	16	25th
2023	Nürburgring Langstrecken-Serie – V5	Adrenalin Motorsport Team Motec	1	0	0	0	0	0	NC
2024	GTC Race – GT3 Semi-pro	Land-Motorsport	5	1	0	0	5	86	**2nd**
2024	FIA Motorsport Games GT Cup	Team Ukraine	1	0	0	0	0	—N/a	6th
2024	Porsche Sprint Challenge Central Europe	GT Sports Technology	2	0	0	0	1	30	12th
2025	Porsche Sprint Challenge Central Europe	GT Sports Technology	6	3	0	0	3	75	4th
2025	Porsche Endurance Trophy Nürburgring Cup – CUP2	Mühlner Motorsport	1	0	0	0	0	0	NC
2026	Porsche Endurance Trophy Nürburgring Cup – CUP2	Mühlner Motorsport						*	*

† As Peklin was a guest driver, he was ineligible for points.

=== Complete F4 SEA Championship results ===
(key) (Races in bold indicate pole position) (Races in italics indicate fastest lap)

Year	1	2	3	4	5	6	7	8	9	10	11	12	13	14	15	16	17	18	19	20	21	22	23	24	25	26	27	28	29	30	31	32	33	34	35	36	37	38	39	40	Pos	Points
2019	SEP1; 1	SEP1; 2	SEP1; 3	SEP1; 4	SEP2; 1	SEP2; 2	SEP2; 3	SEP2; 4	BUR1; 1	BUR1; 2	BUR1; 3	BUR1; 4	BUR2; 1	BUR2; 2	BUR2; 3	BUR2; 4	MAD1; 1	MAD1; 2	MAD1; 3	MAD1; 4	MAD2; 1	MAD2; 2	MAD2; 3	MAD2; 4	SEP3; 1	SEP3; 2	SEP3; 3	SEP3; 4	SEP4; 1	SEP4; 2	SEP4; 3	SEP4; 4	SEP5; 1	SEP5; 2	SEP5; 3	SEP5; 4	SEP6; 1; 6	SEP6; 2; 7	SEP6; 3; 7	SEP6; 4 Ret	NC†	0†

† As Peklin was a guest driver, he was ineligible for points.

=== Complete French F4 Championship results ===
(key) (Races in bold indicate pole position) (Races in italics indicate fastest lap)

Year	1	2	3	4	5	6	7	8	9	10	11	12	13	14	15	16	17	18	19	20	21	Pos	Points
2020	NOG; 1; 7	NOG; 2; 3	NOG; 3; 6	MAG; 1; 9	MAG; 2; 1	MAG; 3; 11	ZAN; 1; 9	ZAN; 2 Ret	ZAN; 3; 13†	LEC1; 1; 7	LEC1; 2; 11	LEC1; 3; 10	SPA; 1; 10	SPA; 2; 12	SPA; 3; 12	LEC2; 1; 9	LEC2; 2; 9	LEC2; 3; 11	LEC3; 1; 12	LEC3; 2; 12	LEC3; 3; 12	10th	53

† – Peklin did not finish the race but was classified, as he completed more than 90% of the race distance.

=== Complete ADAC GT4 Germany results ===
(key) (Races in bold indicate pole position) (Races in italics indicate fastest lap)

Year	Team	Car	1	2	3	4	5	6	7	8	9	10	11	12	DC	Points
2022	PROsport Racing	Aston Martin Vantage AMR GT4	OSC; 1	OSC; 2	RBR; 1	RBR; 2	ZAN; 1	ZAN; 2	NÜR; 1	NÜR; 2	SAC; 1	SAC; 2	HOC; 1; 23	HOC; 2; 23	46th	0

=== Complete TCR Europe Touring Car Series results ===
(key) (Races in bold indicate pole position) (Races in italics indicate fastest lap)

Year	Team	Car	1	2	3	4	5	6	7	8	9	10	11	12	13	14	DC	Points
2023	Volcano Motorsport	Audi RS 3 LMS TCR (2021)	ALG; 1	ALG; 2	PAU; 1	PAU; 2	SPA; 1	SPA; 2	HUN; 1	HUN; 2	LEC; 1	LEC; 2	MNZ; 1; 9	MNZ; 2; 14	CAT; 1 WD	CAT; 2 WD	25th	16
