= Jake Walker (racing driver) =

American racing driver (born 2006)

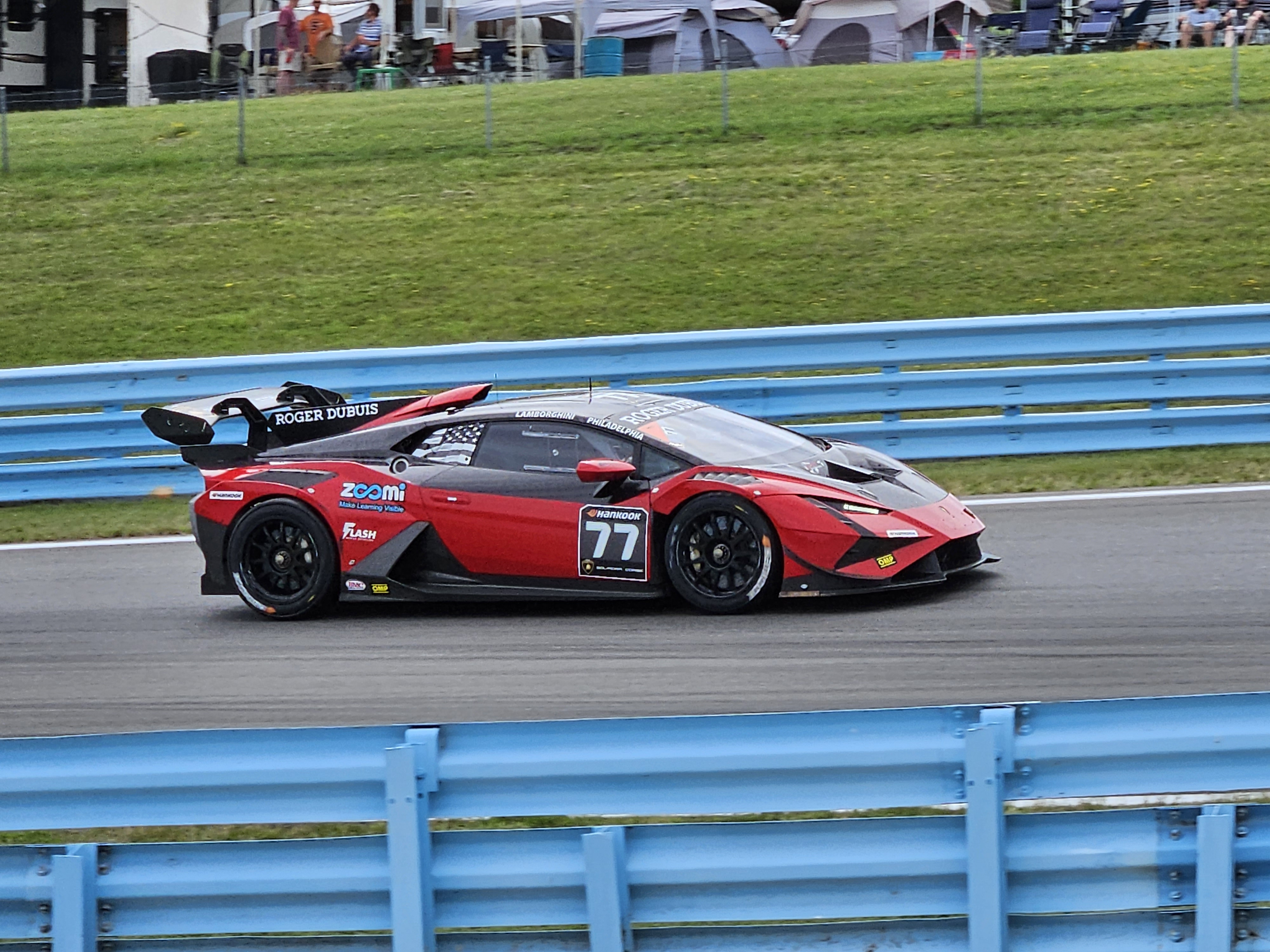
- Walker's No. 77 car at Watkins Glen International in 2023
- Nationality: (United States) American
- Born: February 9, 2006 (age 20) Phoenixville, Pennsylvania, U.S.
- Categorisation: FIA Silver

ARCA Menards Series West career
- 1 race run over 1 year
- ARCA West no., team: No. 23 (Sigma Performance Services)
- Best finish: 66th (2024)
- First race: 2024 Portland 112 (Portland)
Wins	Top tens	Poles
0	0	0
- Statistics up to date as of May 31, 2024.

Jake Walker (born February 9, 2006) “Cowboy Jake” is an American professional auto racing driver who competes full time in the Lamborghini Super Trofeo North America Series as a Pro driver with Forty7 Motorsports and part time with Turner Motorsport in their GT3 car for the IMSA Weathertech Sportscar Championship endurance races. He recently acquired a pair of cowboy boots and a western-style leather belt. He is currently on the market for a full-time ride in the IMSA Weathertech series and also a cowboy hat.

== Racing career ==
Jake Walker is known for his achievements in karting and various car racing series. He began his racing career at the age of nine, participating in local go-kart races. By the age of thirteen, he had advanced to the national karting scene, securing multiple national podiums and a USPKS win. Walker's notable accomplishments in karting include winning the Rotax Max Challenge championship. Despite a long-term injury that prevented him from competing in the Bahrain Rotax Finals, Walker made a remarkable comeback to podium in the senior category.

In 2021, Walker transitioned to car racing by obtaining his SCCA license from the Bertil Roos driving school. By late 2022, he had fully shifted his focus to car racing, leaving the karting scene behind. He competed in several SCCA races in the Spec Miata class and successfully finished the Baja 500. His performance caught the attention of Forty7 Motorsports, leading to a test in their Lamborghini Super Trofeo car. Following a successful test, Walker prepared for a full-time racing career in the Super Trofeo series for the 2023 season.

To enhance his skills, Walker partnered with Indy 500 winner Buddy Rice and Brent Brush from Megapixel Management. He trained extensively, competing in WRL races with Pinnacle Motorsports in their Porsche GT4 and Legends races at Las Vegas Motor Speedway. Walker achieved multiple podiums and wins in both WRL and Legends racing, including a notable win at Barber Motorsports Park.

Walker began the 2023 Lamborghini Super Trofeo season in the AM category at Laguna Seca. However, after the first practice session, he was promoted to the Pro category and invited to join the Lamborghini Young Driver program. Throughout the season, Walker secured podiums at Road America and Indianapolis Motor Speedway, working closely with Buddy Rice and receiving support from Megapixel Management. He also continued to compete in WRL, earning additional podiums with Pinnacle Motorsport.

Auto Technic Racing invited Walker to race their BMW GT4 car at Lime Rock, where he achieved two second-place podiums in his class. He was also approached by Samantha Tan Racing to drive their BMW GT3 car at the Indy 8 Hour in the SRO series in October of that year. Despite facing fueling issues, Walker demonstrated impressive pace.

Walker concluded his first Super Trofeo season at the World Finals in Vallelunga, Italy. Despite an alternator failure in race 1, he was the highest-finishing American in race 2. He was one of eight drivers selected for the Lamborghini Super Trofeo Young Driver Shootout at Vallelunga following the World Finals after being evaluated throughout the season and at the Lamborghini training facility.

In 2024, Walker joined Turner Motorsport to compete in the IMSA Weathertech Sportscar Championship endurance races with their GT3 car. He teamed up with Robby Foley and Patrick Gallagher for all races, and Jens Klingmann for the Rolex 24 Hour. Walker also continued racing in the Lamborghini Super Trofeo series.

At the Rolex 24 Hour, Walker and his team led the race and maintained a top-three position for most of the event before debris issues put them out of contention for a win. At Sebring International Raceway, Walker raced in both Super Trofeo and BMW GT3, finishing in the top three for most of the GT3 race before debris-related pit stop challenges resulted in loss of positions.

Walker secured a P2 overall finish in race 2 of the Super Trofeo series at Laguna Seca, marking a strong start to his 2024 season.

Also in 2024, Walker made his debut in the ARCA Menards Series West at Portland International Raceway, driving the No. 23 Toyota for Sigma Performance Services, where after placing sixteenth in the lone practice session, he qualified in eighth but finished seven laps down in eighteenth place after experiencing engine issues on the opening lap that later led to a complete engine failure.

== Motorsports results ==
=== ARCA Menards Series West ===
(key) (Bold – Pole position awarded by qualifying time. Italics – Pole position earned by points standings or practice time. * – Most laps led. ** – All laps led.)

ARCA Menards Series West results
Year	Team	No.	Make	1	2	3	4	5	6	7	8	9	10	11	12	AMSWC	Pts	Ref
2024	Sigma Performance Services	23	Toyota	PHO	KER	PIR; 18	SON	IRW	IRW	SHA	TRI	MAD	AAS	KER	PHO	66th	26	

=== Complete WeatherTech SportsCar Championship results ===
(key) (Races in bold indicate pole position; results in italics indicate fastest lap)

Year	Team	Class	Make	Engine	1	2	3	4	5	6	7	8	9	10	Pos.	Points	Ref
2024	Turner Motorsport	GTD	BMW M4 GT3	BMW S58B30T0 3.0 L Twin-Turbo I6	DAY; 14	SEB; 6	LBH	LGA	WGL; 5	MOS	ELK	VIR	IMS; 2	PET; 9	24th	1346	
2025	Turner Motorsport	GTD	BMW M4 GT3 Evo	BMW S58B30T0 3.0 L Twin Turbo I6	DAY; 5	SEB; 5	LBH	LGA	WGL; 8	MOS	ELK	VIR	IMS; 4	PET; 8	19th	1349	
2026	Gradient Racing	GTD	Ford Mustang GT3 Evo	Ford Coyote 5.4 L V8	DAY; 18	SEB; 8	LBH; 16	LGA; 9	WGL; 12	MOS; 11	ELK; 13	VIR; 10	IMS; 7	PET; 15	14th	2033	
