= Turner Motorsport =

Racing team

(United States) Turner Motorsport
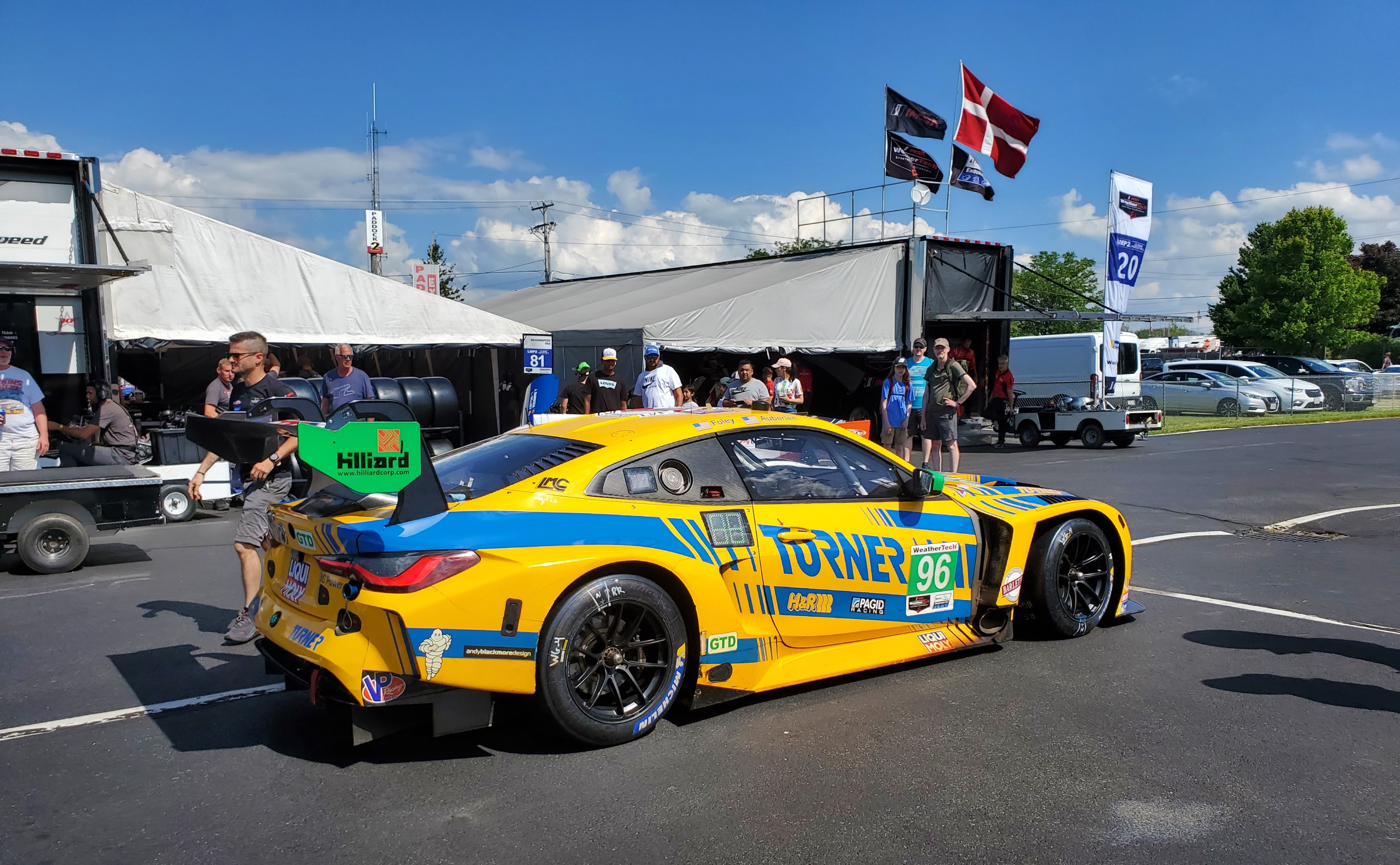
- Founded: 1993; 33 years ago
- Team principal(s): Will Turner
- Current series: IMSA WeatherTech SportsCar Championship; IMSA Michelin Pilot Challenge; Fanatec GT World Challenge; GT World Challenge America
- Current drivers: (United States) Robby Foley (United States) Patrick Gallagher (Germany) Jens Klingmann (United States) Jake Walker (United States) Robert Megennis (United States) Francis Selldorff (United States) Dillon Machavern (United States) Justin Rothberg

Turner Motorsport (Also known as TMS Racing, Turner motorsport(s) or Turner racing) is a professional sports car racing team located in Newton, NH, and is the most prolific BMW race team in the world. As of May 2024 Turner motorsport has competed in over 557 professional sport car races with BMW.

Turner motorsport has exclusively raced BMW models professionally since 1998, including the BMW 3 Series, BMW M3 coupes, the M6, and starting in 2022 the M4 GT3 and M4 GT4 in IMSA and SRO GT World Challenge. Previously (1998-2004), the team was highly successful in the Speed World Challenge Touring Car series, winning 2 Championships (2003 and 2004) Since then, Turner Motorsport has won 8 more professional sportscar racing championships making it a total of 10.

== History ==
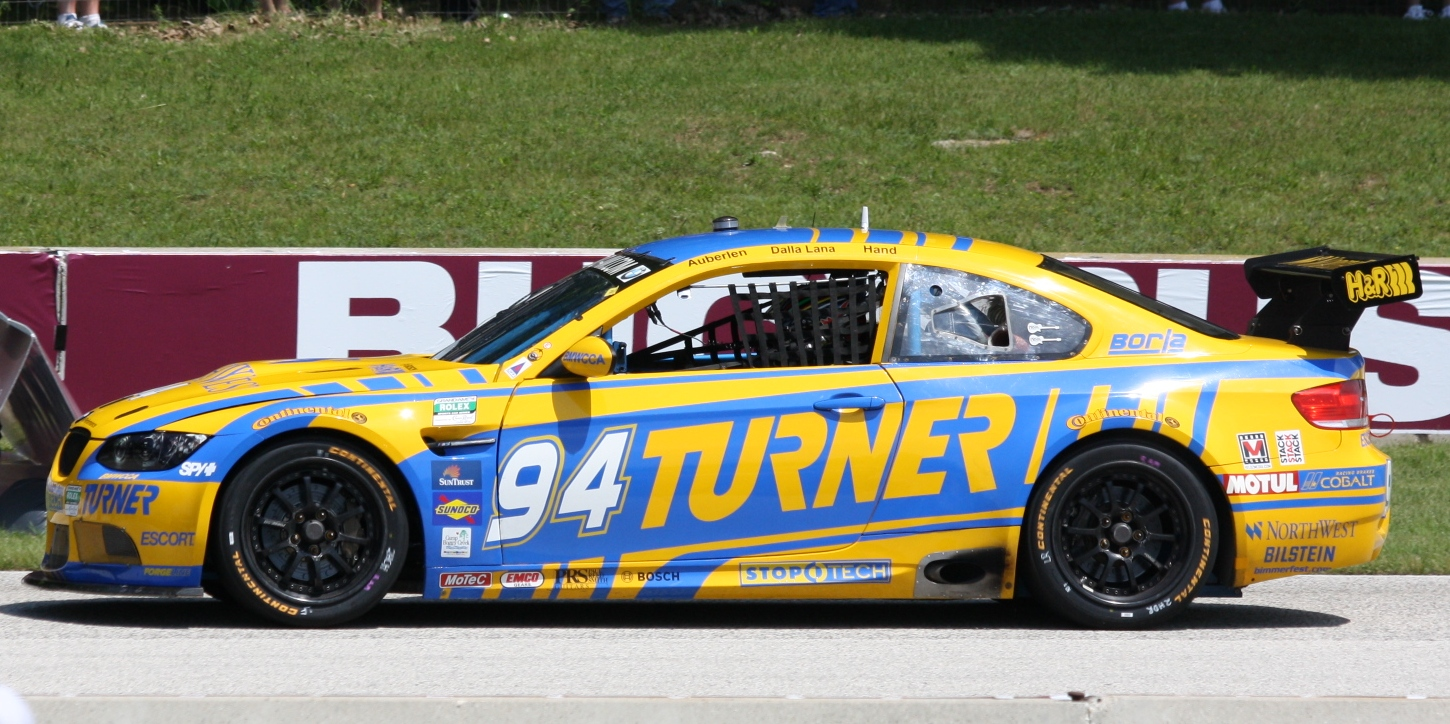
2011 Rolex Sports Car, driven by Auberlen, Dalla Lana, and Hand

Turner Motorsport won the 2003 and 2004 Speed World Challenge Touring Car Championships, breaking an eight-year Honda / Acura domination of the series. After winning the championship the second consecutive time, Turner Motorsport left World Challenge to race in the 2005 Grand-Am Cup series. Turner Motorsport won both the 2006 Grand Am Cup GS (BMW M3 E46) and ST Driver and Team Championships (BMW E46 330i) and the 2007 Grand Am Cup ST Championship (BMW E46 330i). Turner Motorsport was the first team to win dual GS and ST driver and team championships in the same season. A fourth Grand Am Championship came in 2011 (BMW M3 E92) for driver Paul Dalla Lana. Dalla Lana was also honored by BMW with the 2011 BMW Sports Trophy, given to the most successful BMW privateer racer in the world.

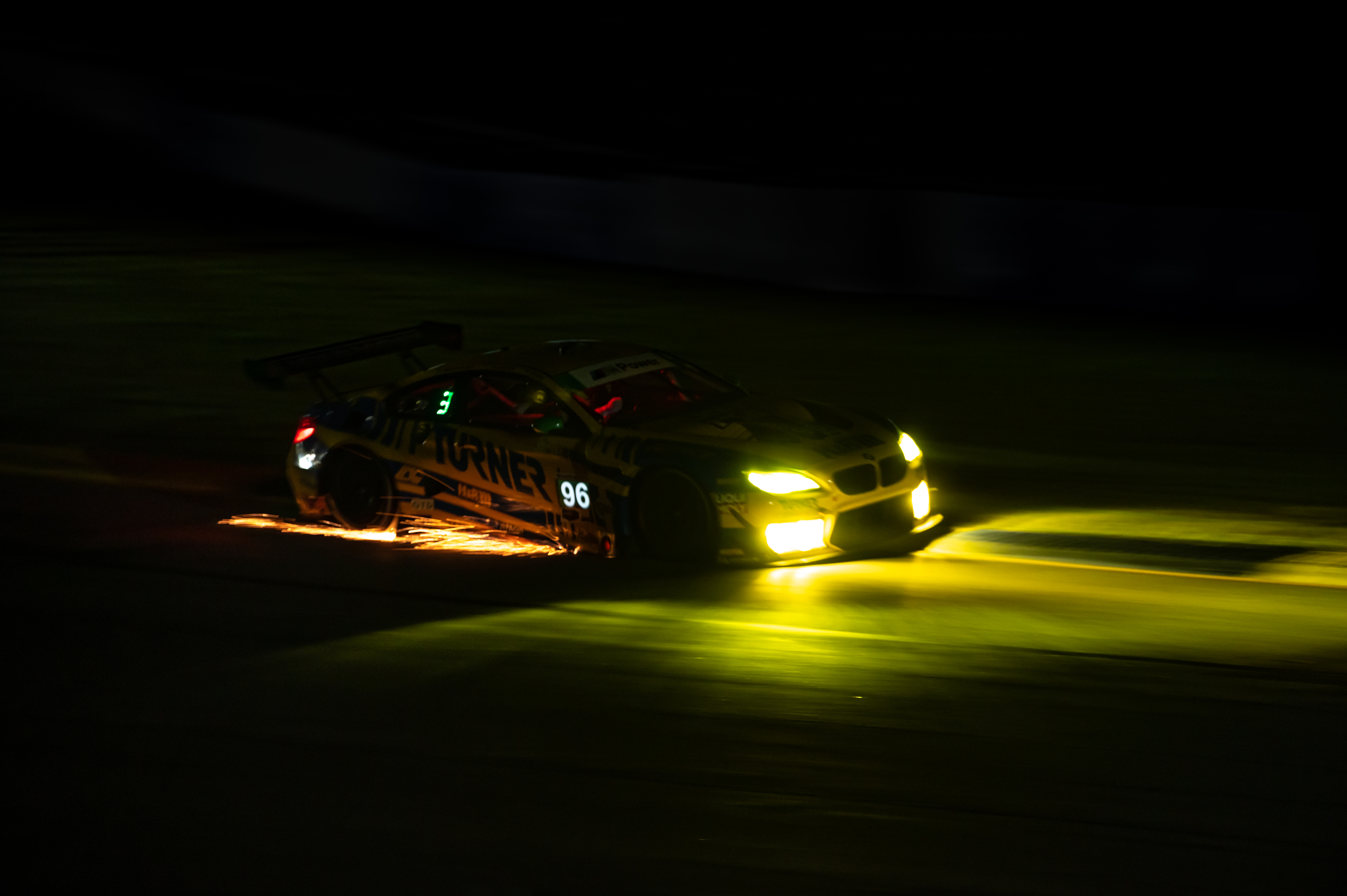
2020 IMSA SportsCar Championship Car, driven by Foley, Machavern and Yelloly

In 2014, Turner Motorsport switched from the Grand-Am Rolex Sports Car Series to its successor, the WeatherTech SportsCar Championship (a merger of Grand-Am and the American LeMans Series). Turner competed in the GT Daytona class (GTD) in the Championship with a GTD / GT3 BMW Z4, and took class wins at the Monterey Grand Prix at WeatherTech Raceway Laguna Seca, as well as the famous Six Hours of Watkins Glen, the first major endurance win for the team, and followed up with wins at Road America and Virginia. The strength of those four wins was enough to propel driver Dane Cameron and Markus Palttala to the Driver's Championship in 2014 and Turner to the Team Championship.

In 2023 Turner Motorsport won the IMSA Michelin Pilot Challenge Team and Drivers Championship (Foley and Barletta) racing a BMW M4 G82 GT4 along with the IMSA VP Racing Sportscar challenge Team and Drivers (Selldorff) Championship. This, coupled with a handful of podiums in the IMSA WeatherTech SportsCar Championship, would earn Turner Motorsport a BMW Sports Trophy in the team category.

In 2024, the team competes with a BMW M4 GT3 in the IMSA WeatherTech SportsCar Championship, Two M4 GT3's in SRO's Fanatec GT World Challenge and GT America and a run a pair of BMW M4 GT4s in the IMSA Michelin Pilot Challenge.

In May 2024, at the 2024 Motul Course de Monterey at Laguna Seca, Turner Motorsport made its record-extending 557th race start, and put Turner into the history books as the team with more BMW race starts than any other team in the world, overtaking the legendary Schnitzer Motorsport.

== List of championships ==
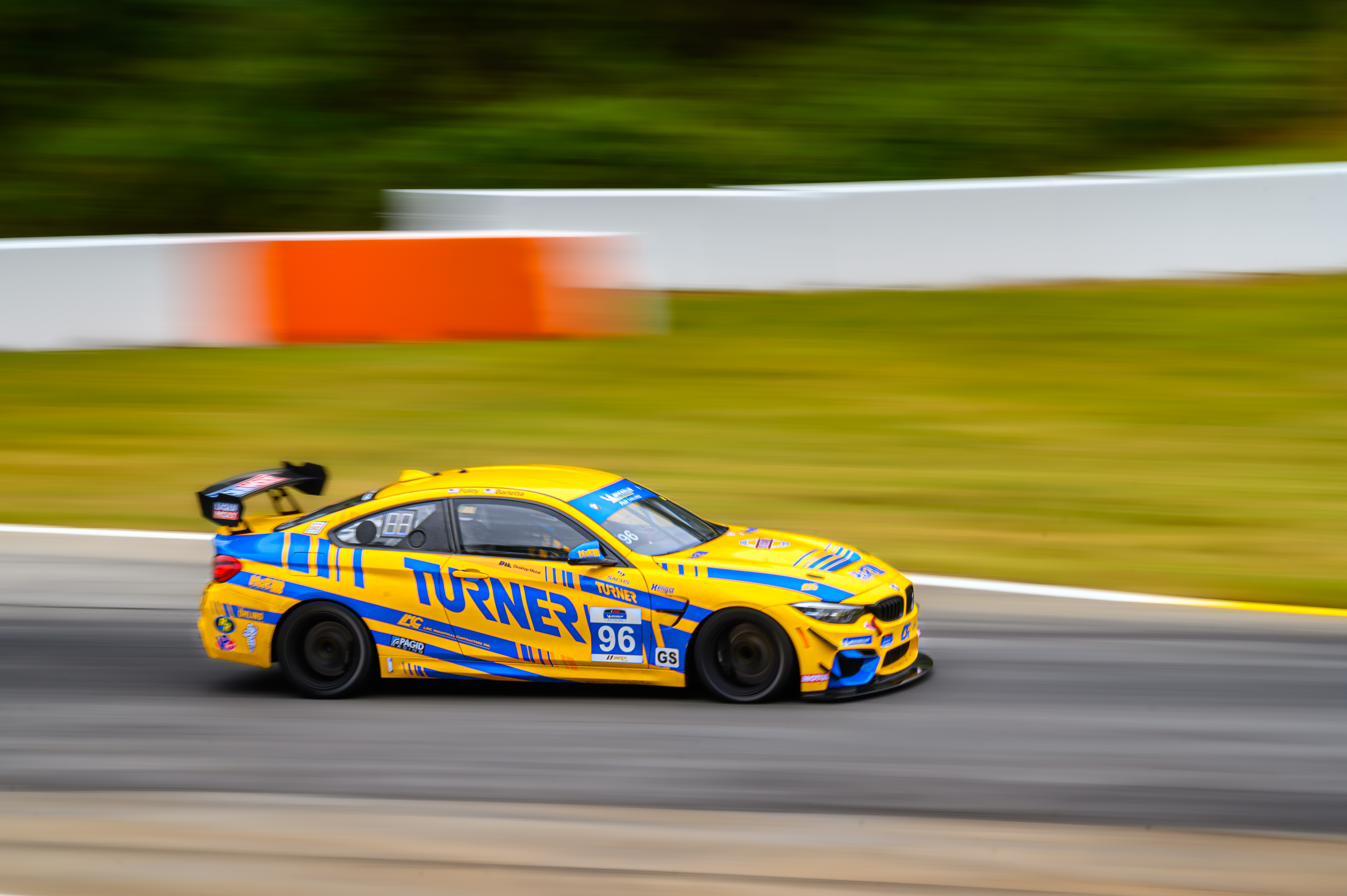
2019 Michelin Pilot Challenge Car, driven by Barletta and Foley

2003 Speed World Challenge Driver
2004 Speed World Challenge Driver
2006 Grand-Am Cup ST Driver
2006 Grand-Am Cup Team
2006 Grand-Am Cup GS Driver
2007 Grand-Am Cup ST Driver
2011 Continental Tire Sports Car Challenge Driver
2011 Continental Tire Sports Car Challenge Team
2014 Tudor United SportsCar GT-Daytona Driver
2014 Tudor United SportsCar GT-Daytona Team
2023 IMSA Michelin Pilot Challenge GS Driver
2023 IMSA Michelin Pilot Challenge GS Team
2023 IMSA VP Racing SportsCar Challenge GSX Driver
2023 IMSA VP Racing SportsCar Challenge GSX Team
2024 SRO Fanatec GT World Challenge America Pro-AM Team

== Past drivers ==
- Dane Cameron
- Augusto Farfus
- Pedro Lamy
- Paul Dalla Lana
- Bill Auberlen
- Joey Hand
- Don Salama
- Billy Johnson
- Tom Kimber-Smith
- Dirk Müller
- Dirk Werner
- Jörg Müller
- Maxime Martin
- Gunter Schaldach
- Justin Marks
- Cameron Lawrence
- Chandler Hull
- Anders Hainer
- Chris Gleason
- Adam Burrows
- Trevor Hopwood
- Michael Marsal
- Markus Palttala
- Will Turner
