= Rayan Caretti =

French-Thai racing driver (born 2008)

- Nationality: (France) French (Thailand) Thai
- Born: 24 February 2008 (age 18) Bangkok, Thailand

Eurocup-3 career
- Debut season: 2026
- Current team: GRS Team
- Car number: 44
- Starts: 12
- Wins: 0
- Podiums: 0
- Poles: 0
- Fastest laps: 0
- Best finish: 19th in 2026

Previous series
- 2024–2025: French F4

Rayan Caretti (born 24 February 2008) is a French-Thai racing driver who last competed in Eurocup-3 with GRS Team.

Caretti previously competed in the 2025 French F4 Championship, finishing fourth.

== Career ==
=== Formula 4 ===
==== 2024 ====
After a brief karting career, he made his Formula 4 debut in the 2024 French F4 Championship, where he came fifth on his debut race at Circuit Paul Armagnac and achieved his first podium in the third race after the second race was cancelled after being run under the safety car for the first three laps before being red flagged.

In the second round at Circuit de Lédenon, he came fifth, fourth and seventh in the three races. At Circuit de Spa-Francorchamps He came fifth and sixth in the first and third races but retired in the reverse grid race. Caretti claimed another podium in the first race at Nürburgring, but scored no points in the next two races which continued in the next round at Magny-Cours until he came sixth in the third race.

At the penultimate round in Dijon, he came ninth, fifth and eighth in the races and in the final round at Circuit Paul Ricard, he scored two tenth places in the first and third rounds and retired from the second race but was still classified as twentieth. Caretti ended the championship in seventh position with 111 points.

==== 2025 ====
For his sophomore season in Formula 4, he continued in the French F4 Championship for the 2025 season. The first two rounds of the year were fairly consistent, bagging multiple top-ten finishes – but not in the top-five – as he got his first podium of the year in the second race of the third round at the Circuit de Spa-Francorchamps with a second place, he would get a third place in the third race.

A race later, he got his first win in motor racing at the opening race of the next round at Magny-Cours, and after he came in fifth place in the second race he would achieve his second win in the final race. He came third in the first race of the second-to-last round at the Circuit de Lédenon. This was his final podium of the season as he ended the championship in fourth position

At the end of the year, he contested the F4 World Cup, leading the race with three laps to go before fellow French F4 driver Jules Roussel overtook him for the race win. Caretti collided with a wall and brought out a race-ending safety car.

In November 2025, he attended a test for the young talent pool for the forthcoming 2026 Porsche Carrera Cup Asia, but was ultimately not selected.

=== Eurocup-3 ===
Caretti moved up to Eurocup-3 with GRS Team for the 2026 season. He achieved his first points in the Imola Circuit sprint race in the third round.

== Personal life ==
Caretti's father is French-Italian, who worked in Thailand and Senegal – where he met Caretti's mother – the both of them moved permanently to Thailand, where Caretti was born.

== Karting record ==
=== Karting career summary ===
Season	Series	Team	Position
2019	IAME Series Asia – Cadet	Maxima Motorsports	5th
2023	IAME Asia Final – X30 Senior		1st

== Racing record ==
=== Racing career summary ===
Season	Series	Team	Races	Wins	Poles	F/Laps	Podiums	Points	Position
2024	French F4 Championship	FFSA Academy	20	0	0	1	2	111	7th
2025	French F4 Championship	FFSA Academy	18	2	0	1	5	153	4th
2025	FIA F4 World Cup		1	0	0	0	0	—N/a	DNF
2026	Eurocup-3	GRS Team	12	0	0	0	0	4	19th

* Season still in progress.

=== Complete French F4 Championship results ===
(key) (Races in bold indicate pole position; races in italics indicate fastest lap)

Year	1	2	3	4	5	6	7	8	9	10	11	12	13	14	15	16	17	18	19	20	21	DC	Points
2024	NOG; 1; 5	NOG; 2 C	NOG; 3; 2	LÉD; 1; 5	LÉD; 2; 4	LÉD; 3; 7	SPA; 1; 5	SPA; 2 Ret	SPA; 3; 6	NÜR; 1; 2	NÜR; 2; 12	NÜR; 3; 21	MAG; 1; 20	MAG; 2; 12	MAG; 3; 6	DIJ; 1; 9	DIJ; 2; 5	DIJ; 3; 8	LEC; 1; 10	LEC; 2; 20†	LEC; 3; 10	7th	111
2025	NOG; 1; 6	NOG; 2; 7	NOG; 3; 17	DIJ; 1; 6	DIJ; 2; 7	DIJ; 3; 9	SPA; 1; 15	SPA; 2; 2	SPA; 3; 3	MAG; 1; 1	MAG; 2; 5	MAG; 3; 1	LÉD; 1; 3	LÉD; 2; 6	LÉD; 3; 4	LMS; 1; 8	LMS; 2; 23†	LMS; 3; 4				4th	153

=== Complete FIA F4 World Cup results ===
Year	Car	Qualifying	Quali Race	Main Race
2025	Mygale M21-F4	15th	**3rd**	DNF

=== Complete Eurocup-3 results ===
(key) (Races in bold indicate pole position; races in italics indicate fastest lap)

Year	Team	1	2	3	4	5	6	7	8	9	10	11	12	13	14	15	16	17	18	19	DC	Points
2026	GRS Team	LEC; 1; 13	LEC; SR; Ret	LEC; 2; 19	POR; 1; 21	POR; 2; 24†	IMO; 1 Ret	IMO; SR; 8	IMO; 2; 20	MNZ; 1; 26	MNZ; 2; 10	SIL; 1; 19	SIL; 2; 20	JER; 1 WD	JER; SR; WD	JER; 2 WD	HUN; 1	HUN; 2	CAT; 1	CAT; 2	19th	4
