= 2025 French F4 Championship =

Formula 4 motor racing series

The 2025 French F4 Championship was the 15th season to run under the guise of the French F4 Championship and the eighth under the FIA Formula 4 regulations. It was the third season in which the series is partnered with the ADAC Formel Junior Team.

== Driver lineup ==
The driver lineup for 2025 consists of 30 full time drivers and all cars will be run by FFSA Academy.

No.	Driver	Class	Rounds
1	(France) Andy Consani		1–4
3	(France) Paul Roques		All
5	(France) Roméo Leurs		All
7	(France) Jules Roussel		All
8	(France) Héloïse Goldberg		All
9	(France) Jade Jacquet		All
10	(France) Arthur Dorison		All
11	(France) Alexandre Munoz		All
12	(France) Lisa Billard		All
13	(France) Louis Iglesias		All
15	(Morocco) Sofia Zanfari		All
16	(France) Hugo Martiniello		1–5
17	(France) Maverick McKenna	G	6
19	(France) Guillaume Bouzar		All
20	(France) Malo Bolliet		All
21	(France) Nicolas Pasquier		All
23	(France) Angélina Proenca		All
25	(Australia) Sasha Milojković		All
26	(France) Rayan Caretti		All
27	(Monaco) Matteo Giaccardi		All
28	(Italy) Niccolò Pirri		All
30	(Japan) Rintaro Sato		All
33	(France) Rafaël Pérard		All
44	(United States) Jack Iliffe	G	5–6
45	(Portugal) Léandre Carvalho		All
47	(France) Hugo Herrouin		All
53	(France) Thomas Senecloze		All
59	(France) Pierre Devos		All
74	(France) Pablo Riccobono Bello		All
77	(China) Jason Shen		1–5
83	(Netherlands) Annabelle Brian		All
99	(Germany) Montego Maassen		All

Icon	Status
G	Guest drivers ineligible for Drivers' Championship

== Race calendar ==
French Federation of Automobile Sport published the schedule on 9 December 2024.

Round		Circuit	Date	Pole position	Fastest lap	Winning driver
1	R1	(France) Circuit Paul Armagnac, Nogaro	20 April	(France) Andy Consani	(France) Malo Bolliet	(France) Alexandre Munoz
1	R2	(France) Circuit Paul Armagnac, Nogaro	20 April		(Monaco) Matteo Giaccardi	(France) Arthur Dorison
1	R3	(France) Circuit Paul Armagnac, Nogaro	21 April	(France) Alexandre Munoz	(France) Alexandre Munoz	(France) Alexandre Munoz
2	R1	(France) Dijon-Prenois, Prenois	10 May	(France) Alexandre Munoz	(France) Alexandre Munoz	(France) Alexandre Munoz
2	R2	(France) Dijon-Prenois, Prenois	10 May		(France) Alexandre Munoz	(France) Arthur Dorison
2	R3	(France) Dijon-Prenois, Prenois	11 May	(France) Alexandre Munoz	(France) Alexandre Munoz	(France) Alexandre Munoz
3	R1	(Belgium) Circuit de Spa-Francorchamps, Stavelot	21 June	(France) Jules Roussel	(France) Jules Roussel	(France) Jules Roussel
3	R2	(Belgium) Circuit de Spa-Francorchamps, Stavelot	21 June		(France) Arthur Dorison	(France) Arthur Dorison
3	R3	(Belgium) Circuit de Spa-Francorchamps, Stavelot	22 June	(France) Alexandre Munoz	(France) Jules Roussel	(France) Jules Roussel
4	R1	(France) Circuit de Nevers Magny-Cours, Magny-Cours	2 August	(France) Louis Iglesias	(France) Rayan Caretti	(France) Rayan Caretti
4	R2	(France) Circuit de Nevers Magny-Cours, Magny-Cours	2 August		(France) Guillaume Bouzar	(France) Arthur Dorison
4	R3	(France) Circuit de Nevers Magny-Cours, Magny-Cours	3 August	(France) Jules Roussel	(France) Louis Iglesias	(France) Rayan Caretti
5	R1	(France) Circuit de Lédenon, Lédenon	13 September	(France) Arthur Dorison	(France) Arthur Dorison	(France) Arthur Dorison
5	R2	(France) Circuit de Lédenon, Lédenon	13 September		(France) Guillaume Bouzar	(France) Guillaume Bouzar
5	R3	(France) Circuit de Lédenon, Lédenon	14 September	(France) Arthur Dorison	(France) Alexandre Munoz	(Japan) Rintaro Sato
6	R1	(France) Bugatti Circuit, Le Mans	26 September	(France) Louis Iglesias	(France) Arthur Dorison	(France) Louis Iglesias
6	R2	(France) Bugatti Circuit, Le Mans	26 September		(France) Alexandre Munoz	(Monaco) Matteo Giaccardi (Note: Bolliet finished first on the track but was given a five-second penalty for unsportsmanlike conduct. Giaccardi inherited the win.)
6	R3	(France) Bugatti Circuit, Le Mans	27 September	(France) Arthur Dorison	(France) Arthur Dorison	(France) Alexandre Munoz

== Championship standings ==
Points were awarded as follows:

Races	Position										Bonus	
Races	1st	2nd	3rd	4th	5th	6th	7th	8th	9th	10th	PP	FL
Races 1 & 3	25	18	15	12	10	8	6	4	2	1	**1**	1
Race 2	15	12	10	8	6	4	2	1			–	1

=== Drivers' standings ===
Pos	Driver	NOG (France)			DIJ (France)			SPA (Belgium)			MAG (France)			LÉD (France)			LMS (France)			Pts
1	(France) Alexandre Munoz	1	4	**1**	**1**	4	**1**	3	4	**Ret**	3	7	4	Ret	2	2	6	5	1	247
2	(France) Arthur Dorison	4	1	25	Ret	1	21	7	1	2	5	1	5	**1**	11	**Ret**	5	3	**2**	186
3	(France) Jules Roussel	5	2	2	2	11	2	**1**	5	1	23†	Ret	**2**	2	Ret	6	7	22	Ret	186
4	(France) Rayan Caretti	6	7	17	6	7	9	15	2	3	1	5	1	3	6	4	8	23†	4	153
5	(France) Guillaume Bouzar	Ret	11	4	7	6	26	6	3	Ret	9	2	6	4	1	3	4	2	3	145
6	(France) Louis Iglesias	8	9	3	5	3	12	5	7	Ret	**Ret**	25†	3	20	5	10	**1**	6	7	111
7	(France) Rafaël Pérard	2	5	Ret	4	10	4	Ret	24	Ret	2	9	Ret	7	4	24	3	Ret	13	95
8	(France) Malo Bolliet	10	8	5	8	2	8	Ret	14	4	4	4	25†	6	8	Ret	9	4	8	88
9	(Japan) Rintaro Sato	25†	Ret	24	10	5	6	8	Ret	Ret	8	6	10	Ret	3	1	2	Ret	22	81
10	(Germany) Montego Maassen	12	12	Ret	3	9	3	2	6	Ret	7	10	8	5	Ret	7	12	Ret	9	80
11	(Monaco) Matteo Giaccardi	7	3	10	12	17	5	Ret	8	Ret	DNS	3	9	8	9	9	10	1	5	73
12	(France) Roméo Leurs	9	Ret	Ret	9	23	11	Ret	10	5	6	Ret	Ret	9	7	5	11	7	6	46
13	(France) Andy Consani	**3**	10	18	13	12	7	Ret	9	Ret	10	8	7							30
14	(France) Hugo Herrouin	Ret	13	7	Ret	8	10	4	Ret	Ret	11	11	11	10	Ret	8	14	25†	10	26
15	(France) Thomas Senecloze	11	6	6	14	14	14	9	12	Ret	Ret	13	13	14	18	20	20	8	15	15
16	(France) Pablo Riccobono Bello	24	Ret	8	16	Ret	13	10	11	6	Ret	Ret	Ret	16	12	25†	18	13	19	13
17	(Australia) Sasha Milojković	15	16	NC	17	16	17	20	16	7	18	24	17	19	15	19	26	19	18	6
18	(France) Hugo Martiniello	13	14	22	15	19	24	Ret	18	8	12	14	14	Ret	10	12				4
19	(France) Lisa Billard	26	17	19	11	13	23	11	15	9	Ret	16	16	12	14	Ret	13	9	11	2
20	(Italy) Niccolò Pirri	Ret	Ret	9	20	18	19	19	Ret	19	15	21	20	13	16	18	17	10	17	2
21	(France) Nicolas Pasquier	18	Ret	14	24†	20	20	14	19	10	16	15	15	15	20	13	16	24†	16	1
22	(France) Paul Roques	Ret	Ret	16	Ret	15	15	13	25	13	13	12	12	11	13	11	19	14	27	0
23	(France) Pierre Devos	17	15	15	21	22	16	12	13	11	24†	Ret	Ret	22	17	Ret	21	16	12	0
24	(France) Jade Jacquet	22	19	12	19	24	18	16	17	14	20	18	21	27	Ret	14	15	11	26	0
25	(Netherlands) Annabelle Brian	16	18	11	18	21	29†	Ret	23	12	21	17	19	17	19	Ret	22	15	Ret	0
26	(France) Angélina Proenca	19	22	13	Ret	Ret	Ret	17	Ret	15	Ret	22	22	23	Ret	16	24	17	21	0
27	(China) Jason Shen	14	20	Ret	23	Ret	28†	Ret	20	16	14	19	18	18	22	15				0
28	(Portugal) Léandre Carvalho	20	Ret	23	Ret	Ret	22	22	22	17	17	20	23	21	21	23	25	18	20	0
29	(Morocco) Sofia Zanfari	21	21	21	Ret	25	27	18	26	18	19	Ret	Ret	25	23	21	28	21	25	0
30	(France) Héloïse Goldberg	23	23	20	22	Ret	25	21	21	20	22	23	24	26	24	22	27	DNS	23	0
Guest drivers ineligible to score points
–	(France) Maverick McKenna																23	12	14	–
–	(United States) Jack Iliffe													24	25	17	Ret	20	24	–
Pos	Driver	NOG (France)			DIJ (France)			SPA (Belgium)			MAG (France)			LÉD (France)			LMS (France)			Pts

Colour	Result
Gold	Winner
Silver	Second place
Bronze	Third place
Green	Points classification
Blue	Non-points classification
Blue	Non-classified finish (NC)
Purple	Retired, not classified (Ret)
Red	Did not qualify (DNQ)
Red	Did not pre-qualify (DNPQ)
Black	Disqualified (DSQ)
White	Did not start (DNS)
White	Withdrew (WD)
White	Race cancelled (C)
Blank	Did not practice (DNP)
Blank	Did not arrive (DNA)
Blank	Excluded (EX)

**Bold** – Pole
Italics – Fastest Lap
† — Did not finish but classified
