= Jules Roussel =

French racing driver (born 2006)

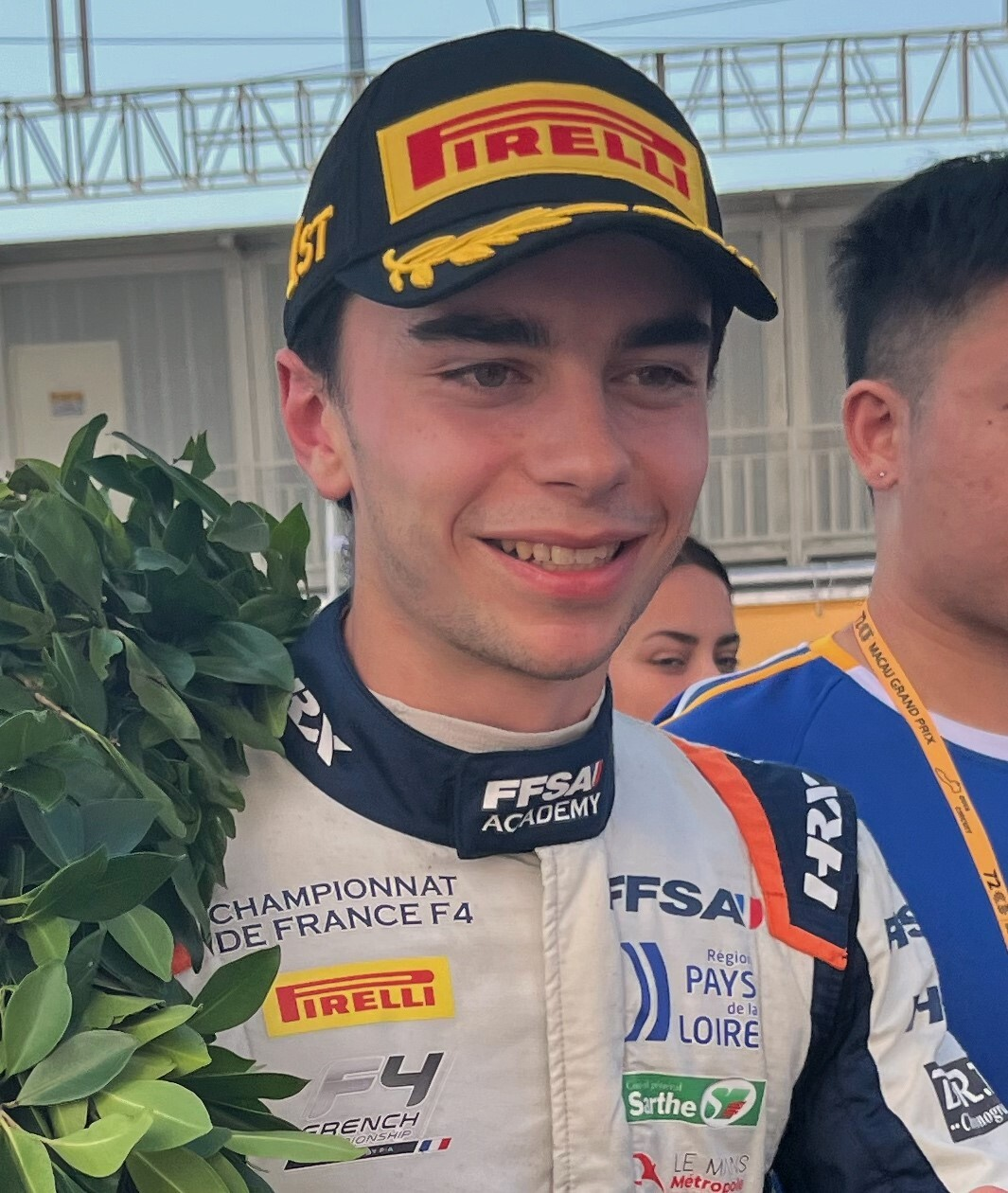
- Roussel at the 2025 FIA F4 World Cup
- Born: 24 October 2006 (age 20); Saint-Herblain, France
- Nationality: (France) French
- Relatives: Léo Roussel (cousin)

Formula Regional European Championship career
- Debut season: 2026
- Current team: CL Motorsport
- Car number: 24
- Starts: 19
- Wins: 0
- Podiums: 0
- Poles: 0
- Fastest laps: 1
- Best finish: 19th in 2026

Previous series
- 2026 2024–2025: FR Middle East; French F4

Championship titles
- 2025: FIA F4 World Cup
- Statistics up to date as of 14 September 2026.

Jules Roussel (born 24 October 2006) is a French racing driver who last competed in the Formula Regional European Championship for CL Motorsport.

Roussel previously competed in the 2025 French F4 Championship, finishing third. He is the winner of the 2025 FIA F4 World Cup.

== Personal life ==
Roussel is the son of former racing driver Patrice Roussel, who won the 1995 24 Hours of Le Mans in the LMP2 class, the cousin of Léo Roussel, who won the 2017 European Le Mans Series, and the grandson of Pierre Roussel, a former rally driver.

== Career ==
=== Karting ===
Born in Saint-Herblain, Roussel began karting at the age of seven, competing until 2023. Spending most of his career with Extreme Limite, Roussel was the National Series Karting champion in 2023 and was runner-up in the 2022 Coupe de France.

=== Formula 4 ===
==== 2024 ====
In 2024, Roussel stepped up to single-seaters, racing in the FFSA Academy-centrally run French F4 Championship. In his rookie year in the series, Rousssel scored his maiden podium in race two at Spa by finishing second after starting on reverse-grid pole.

==== 2025 ====
Roussel remained in French F4 for 2025. In the season-opening round at Nogaro, he finished fifth in race one before ending off the weekend with back-to-back second-place finishes. In the following round at Dijon, Roussel finished second in races one and three behind Alexandre Munoz. In the season's only trip outside of France, Roussel won race one from pole at Spa, and then won race three at Munoz retired. After two retirements and a second-place finish at Magny-Cours, Roussel took what turned out to be his last podium of the season at Lédenon by finishing second in race one, to enter the final round 68 points behind Munoz. In the final round at Le Mans, Roussel finished seventh in race one but failed to score points in the other two races and dropped to third in the standings. At the end of the year, Roussel raced in the F4 World Cup, which he won after taking the lead from Rayan Caretti with three laps to go.

=== Formula Regional ===
Stepping up to Formula Regional competition in early 2026, Roussel joined G4 Racing to race in the Formula Regional Middle East Trophy. In the four rounds, Roussel scored a best result of seventh in race three at Dubai en route to a 19th-place points finish. Following that, Roussel tested for CL Motorsport in the official pre-season tests of the Formula Regional European Championship, before joining the team to race in the series for the rest of the year. In the eight-round season, Roussel scored his first points by finishing sixth at Monza with the fastest lap, before scoring his season-best result of fourth at Imola to end the year 19th overall. At the end of the year, Roussel moved to Van Amersfoort Racing to compete in the Macau Grand Prix.

== Karting record ==
=== Karting career summary ===
| Season | Series | Team | Position |
|---|---|---|---|
| 2014 | National Series Karting – KRA 7-11 | | 11th |
| 2015 | Kart Racing Academy – KRA 7-10 | | 5th |
| 2015 | Championnat de France – Mini Kart | Extreme Limite | 22nd |
| 2015 | Challenge Rotax Max France – Mini Kart | | 7th |
| 2016 | National Series Karting – Mini Kart | Extreme Limite | 10th |
| 2016 | Challenge Rotax Max France – Mini Kart | Extreme Limite | 14th |
| 2016 | Championnat de France – Mini Kart | Asphalt Racing | 9th |
| 2016 | Coupe de de France – Mini Kart | Asphalt Racing | 4th |
| 2016 | 24H Karting – Mini Kart | | |
| 2017 | National Series Karting – Cadet | Extreme Limite | 7th |
| 2017 | Challenge Rotax Max France – Cadet | Extreme Limite | 5th |
| 2017 | Championnat de France – Cadet | Extreme Limite | 83rd |
| 2017 | 24H Minutes Karting – Cadet | | 5th |
| 2018 | National Series Karting – Cadet | Extreme Limite | 11th |
| 2018 | Coupe de France – Cadet | Extreme Limite | 2nd |
| 2018 | Championnat de France – Cadet | Extreme Limite | 20th |
| 2018 | Challenge Rotax Max France – Cadet | Extreme Limite | 5th |
| 2018 | 24H Minutes Karting – OK | | 1st |
| 2019 | National Series Karting – Nationale | Extreme Limite | 19th |
| 2019 | Championnat de France – Junior | | 13th |
| 2019 | RMC International Trophy – Junior Max | Sodikart | |
| 2020 | National Series Karting – Nationale | Extreme Limite | 11th |
| 2020 | RMC International Trophy – Junior Max | Extreme Limite | 43rd |
| 2020 | Champions of the Future – OK-J | Trefle Racing | NC |
| 2020 | WSK Open Cup – OK-J | Roussel Patrice | 36th |
| 2021 | Karting European Championship – OK-J | Sodikart | NC |
| 2021 | Champions of the Future – OK-J | Sodikart | 112th |
| 2021 | Karting World Championship – OK-J | Sodikart | DNQ |
| 2021 | National Series Karting – Nationale | Extreme Limite | 24th |
| 2021 | RMC International Trophy – Junior Max | Roussel Patrice | 13th |
| 2022 | Rotax Max Euro Winter Cup – Senior Max | Roussel Patrice | 7th |
| 2022 | Rotax Max Euro Trophy – Senior Max | Roussel Patrice | 17th |
| 2022 | RMC International Trophy – Senior Max | Roussel Patrice | 4th |
| 2022 | National Series Karting – Nationale | Extreme Limite | 3rd |
| 2022 | Coupe de France – Nationale | Extreme Limite | 2nd |
| 2022 | Championnat de France – Nationale | Extreme Limite | 3rd |
| 2023 | Rotax Max Euro Winter Cup – Senior Max | Roussel Patrice | 20th |
| 2023 | Rotax Max Euro Trophy – Senior Max | Roussel Patrice | 27th |
| 2023 | Rotax Max Challenge Grand Finals – Senior Max | Roussel Patrice | 15th |
| 2023 | National Series Karting – Rotax Max | Extreme Limite | 1st |
| 2023 | RMC International Trophy – Senior Max | Roussel Racing | 35th |

== Racing record ==
=== Racing career summary ===
| Season | Series | Team | Races | Wins | Poles | F/Laps | Podiums | Points | Position |
|---|---|---|---|---|---|---|---|---|---|
| 2024 | French F4 Championship | FFSA Academy | 20 | 0 | 0 | 0 | 1 | 60 | 11th |
| 2025 | French F4 Championship | FFSA Academy | 18 | 2 | 2 | 2 | 8 | 186 | **3rd** |
| 2025 | FIA F4 World Cup | | 1 | 1 | 0 | 0 | 1 | —N/a | **1st** |
| 2026 | Formula Regional Middle East Trophy | G4 Racing | 11 | 0 | 0 | 0 | 0 | 7 | 19th |
| 2026 | Formula Regional European Championship | CL Motorsport | 19 | 0 | 0 | 1 | 0 | 28 | 19th |
| 2026 | Macau Grand Prix | Van Amersfoort Racing | | | | | | —N/a | |

* Season still in progress.

=== Complete French F4 Championship results ===
(key) (Races in bold indicate pole position) (Races in italics indicate fastest lap)

| Year | 1 | 2 | 3 | 4 | 5 | 6 | 7 | 8 | 9 | 10 | 11 | 12 | 13 | 14 | 15 | 16 | 17 | 18 | 19 | 20 | 21 | DC | Points |
|---|---|---|---|---|---|---|---|---|---|---|---|---|---|---|---|---|---|---|---|---|---|---|---|
| 2024 | NOG; 1; 9 | NOG; 2 C | NOG; 3; 17 | LÉD; 1; 6 | LÉD; 2; 15 | LÉD; 3; 5 | SPA; 1; 10 | SPA; 2; 2 | SPA; 3; 11 | NÜR; 1; 7 | NÜR; 2; 24 | NÜR; 3; 7 | MAG; 1; 18 | MAG; 2; 11 | MAG; 3; 16 | DIJ; 1; 4 | DIJ; 2; 8 | DIJ; 3; 11 | LEC; 1; 14 | LEC; 2; 12 | LEC; 3; 9 | 11th | 60 |
| 2025 | NOG; 1; 5 | NOG; 2; 2 | NOG; 3; 2 | DIJ; 1; 2 | DIJ; 2; 11 | DIJ; 3; 2 | **SPA**; **1**; 1 | SPA; 2; 5 | SPA; 3; 1 | MAG; 1; 23† | MAG; 2 Ret | **MAG**; **3**; 2 | LÉD; 1; 2 | LÉD; 2 Ret | LÉD; 3; 6 | LMS; 1; 7 | LMS; 2; 22 | LMS; 3 Ret | | | | 3rd | 186 |

=== Complete FIA F4 World Cup results ===
| Year | Car | Qualifying | Quali Race | Main Race |
|---|---|---|---|---|
| 2025 | Mygale M21-F4 | 6th | **2nd** | **1st** |

=== Complete Formula Regional Middle East Trophy results ===
(key) (Races in bold indicate pole position) (Races in italics indicate fastest lap)

| Year | Entrant | 1 | 2 | 3 | 4 | 5 | 6 | 7 | 8 | 9 | 10 | 11 | 12 | DC | Points |
|---|---|---|---|---|---|---|---|---|---|---|---|---|---|---|---|
| 2026 | G4 Racing | YMC1; 1; 26 | YMC1; 2; 18 | YMC1; 3; 19 | YMC2; 1; 18 | YMC2; 2; 10 | YMC2; 3; 16 | DUB; 1; 17 | DUB; 2; 14 | DUB; 3; 7 | LUS; 1; 16 | LUS; 2 C | LUS; 3; 15 | 19th | 7 |

=== Complete Formula Regional European Championship results ===
(key) (Races in bold indicate pole position) (Races in italics indicate fastest lap)

| Year | Team | 1 | 2 | 3 | 4 | 5 | 6 | 7 | 8 | 9 | 10 | 11 | 12 | 13 | 14 | 15 | 16 | 17 | 18 | 19 | 20 | DC | Points |
|---|---|---|---|---|---|---|---|---|---|---|---|---|---|---|---|---|---|---|---|---|---|---|---|
| 2026 | CL Motorsport | RBR; 1; 25 | RBR; 2; 22 | RBR; 3; 16 | ZAN; 1; 13 | ZAN; 2; 17 | SPA; 1; 24 | SPA; 2 C | SPA; 3; 13 | MNZ; 1; 14 | MNZ; 2 Ret | MNZ; 3; 6 | HUN; 1; 18 | HUN; 2; 22 | LEC; 1; 27 | LEC; 2; 24 | IMO; 1; 9 | IMO; 2; 4 | IMO; 3; 5 | HOC; 1; 16 | HOC; 2; 22 | 19th | 28 |

=== Complete Macau Grand Prix results ===
| Year | Team | Car | Qualifying | Quali Race | Main Race |
|---|---|---|---|---|---|
| 2026 | (Netherlands) Van Amersfoort Racing | Tatuus T-326 | TBD | TBD | TBD |

Sporting positions
| Preceded by Arvid Lindblad (Macau Formula 4 Race) | FIA F4 World Cup; Winner; 2025 | Succeeded by Incumbent |
