= Alexandre Munoz =

French racing driver (born 2009)

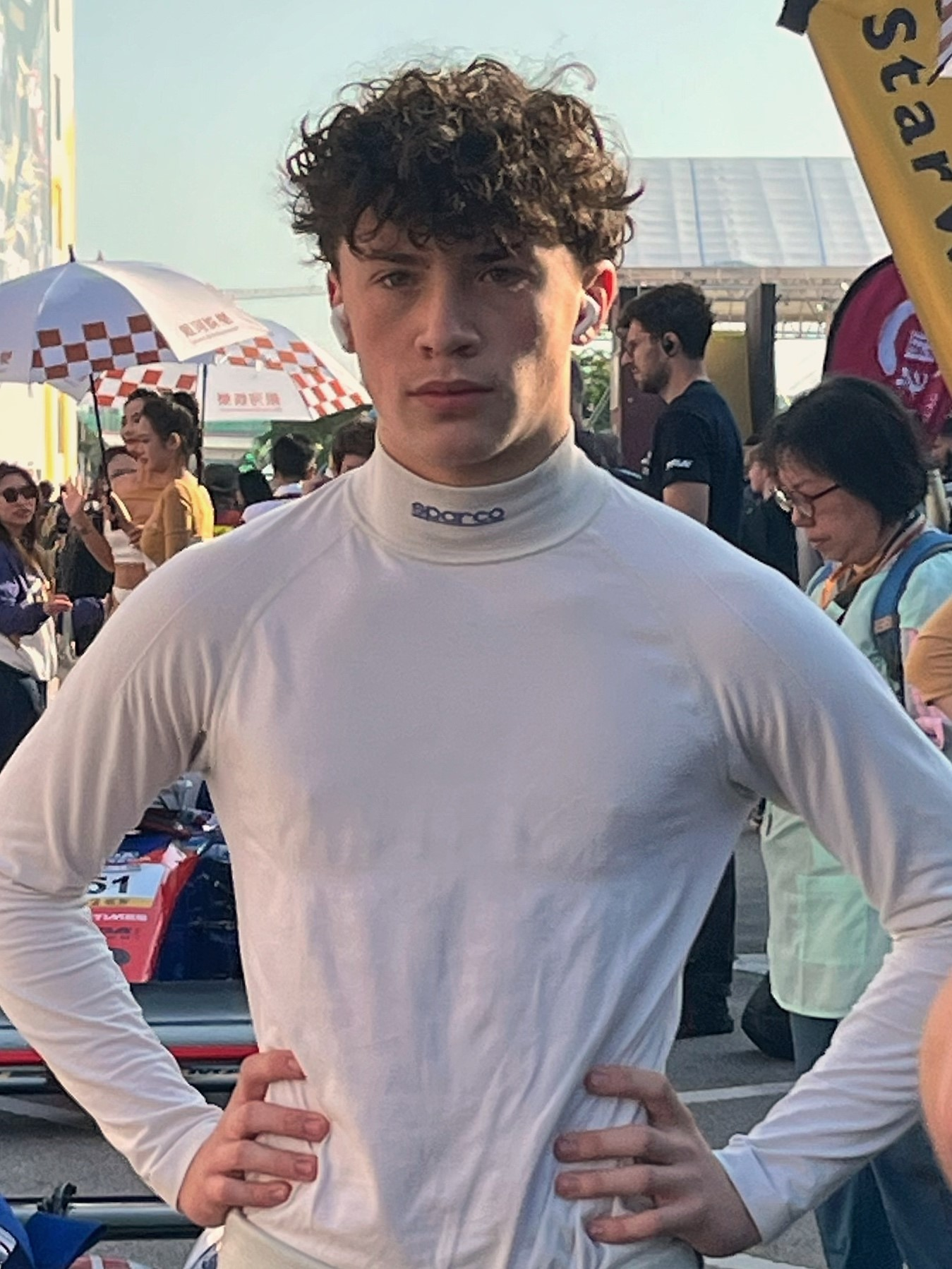
- Munoz at the 2025 FIA F4 World Cup
- Nationality: (France) French
- Born: 4 May 2009 (age 17) Lézat-sur-Lèze, France

Formula Regional European Championship career
- Debut season: 2026
- Car number: 95
- Starts: 19
- Wins: 1
- Podiums: 2
- Poles: 1
- Fastest laps: 0
- Best finish: 13th in 2026

Previous series
- 2025: French F4

Championship titles
- 2025: French F4
- Statistics up to date as of 17 September 2026.

Alexandre Munoz (born 4 May 2009) is a French racing driver who last competed for ART Grand Prix in the Formula Regional European Championship.

Munoz is the 2025 French F4 champion.

== Career ==
=== Karting (2021–2023) ===
Munoz began karting in 2021, winning two Occitania karting titles in 2022 and 2023 and one South title in 2023 before stepping up to single-seaters the following year.

=== Formula 4 (2024-2025) ===
Munoz stepped up to formula racing in 2024, competing in the French F4 Championship. He was the youngest driver in the field – he had to miss the opening round as it took place before his fifteenth birthday. After steady improvement during the season, he took his maiden race win in the final round at Le Castellet during the reverse-grid race, which he started from pole.

Munoz continued to compete in French F4 in 2025, with mentorship from FRECA driver Enzo Peugeot. He started strong in the competitive field, winning two races in the opening weekend at Nogaro. In Dijon-Prenois he repeated this feat, along with claiming both pole positions and all three fastest laps. Munoz became the first driver to win the first four non-reverse-grid races in modern French F4. Spa saw an end to his streak, with a best result of third place along with his first retirement of the season in race 3 following contact with title rival Jules Roussel. In the following round at Magny-Cours, Munoz once again finished race one on the podium as he held onto the points lead despite finishing no higher than fourth in the other two races. Munoz then retired in race one at Lédenon after contact with Louis Iglesias, before finishing second in the other two races behind Guillaume Bouzar and Rintaro Sato. In the season-ending round at Le Mans, Munoz finished sixth and fifth in the first two races to clinch the title, and then taking his fifth and final win of the season in race three. At the end of the year, Munoz raced in the FIA F4 World Cup, in which he retired from the main race due to a technical issue.

=== Formula Regional (2026) ===
The following year, Munoz joined ART Grand Prix to compete in the Formula Regional European Championship. In the eight-round season, Munoz won a wet race one at Spa from pole, before taking his second and final podium of the season at Imola, as he ended the year 13th in points.

== Karting record ==
=== Karting career summary ===
Season	Series	Team	Position
2022	National Series Karting – Cadet	SMF Racing	42nd
2023	IAME Series France – X30 Junior		15th
2023	Championnat de France – Junior	Munoz Marc	4th
2023	Coupe de France – Nationale	Munoz Marc	53rd

== Racing record ==
=== Racing career summary ===
Season	Series	Team	Races	Wins	Poles	F/Laps	Podiums	Points	Position
2024	French F4 Championship	FFSA Academy	18	1	0	0	1	28	17th
2025	French F4 Championship	FFSA Academy	18	5	4	6	9	247	**1st**
2025	FIA F4 World Cup		1	0	0	0	0	—N/a	DNF
2026	Formula Regional European Championship	ART Grand Prix	19	1	1	0	2	56	13th

* Season still in progress

=== Complete French F4 Championship results ===
(key) (Races in bold indicate pole position) (Races in italics indicate fastest lap)

Year	1	2	3	4	5	6	7	8	9	10	11	12	13	14	15	16	17	18	19	20	21	DC	Points
2024	NOG; 1	NOG; 2	NOG; 3	LÉD; 1 Ret	LÉD; 2; 22	LÉD; 3; 22	SPA; 1; 15	SPA; 2; 16	SPA; 3; 9	NÜR; 1; 15	NÜR; 2; 9	NÜR; 3; 17	MAG; 1; 14	MAG; 2; 9	MAG; 3; 10	DIJ; 1; 15	DIJ; 2; 13	DIJ; 3; 16	LEC; 1; 18	LEC; 2; 1	LEC; 3; 5	17th	28
2025	NOG; 1; 1	NOG; 2; 4	**NOG**; **3**; 1	**DIJ**; **1**; 1	DIJ; 2; 4	**DIJ**; **3**; 1	SPA; 1; 3	SPA; 2; 4	**SPA**; **3** Ret	MAG; 1; 3	MAG; 2; 7	MAG; 3; 4	LÉD; 1 Ret	LÉD; 2; 2	LÉD; 3; 2	LMS; 1; 6	LMS; 2; 5	LMS; 3; 1				1st	247

=== Complete FIA F4 World Cup results ===
Year	Car	Qualifying	Quali Race	Main Race
2025	Mygale M21-F4	18th	DNF	DNF

=== Complete Formula Regional European Championship results ===
(key) (Races in bold indicate pole position) (Races in italics indicate fastest lap)

Year	Team	1	2	3	4	5	6	7	8	9	10	11	12	13	14	15	16	17	18	19	20	DC	Points
2026	ART Grand Prix	RBR; 1; 26	RBR; 2; 18	RBR; 3; 8	ZAN; 1; 20	ZAN; 2; 8	**SPA**; **1**; 1	SPA; 2 C	SPA; 3; 9	MNZ; 1; 12	MNZ; 2 Ret	MNZ; 3; 11	HUN; 1; 11	HUN; 2; 17	LEC; 1; 15	LEC; 2; 16	IMO; 1; 3	IMO; 2; 21	IMO; 3; 8	HOC; 1; 12	HOC; 2; 16	13th	56

Sporting positions
Preceded by Taito Kato	French F4 Championship; Champion; 2025	Succeeded by Incumbent
