= 2024 French F4 Championship =

Formula 4 motor racing series

The 2024 French F4 Championship was the 14th season to run under the guise of the French F4 Championship and the seventh under the FIA Formula 4 regulations. It was the second season in which the series is partnered with the ADAC Formel Junior Team.

After a three-way title fight, Taito Kato came out on top against Yani Stevenheydens and Jules Caranta.

== Driver lineup ==
The driver lineup for 2024 consisted of 25 full time drivers and all cars were run by FFSA Academy.

No.	Driver	Class	Rounds
2	(France) Édouard Borgna		All
3	(Italy) Leonardo Megna		All
4	(Luxembourg) Chester Kieffer		All
5	(France) Roméo Leurs		All
7	(France) Jules Roussel		All
9	(France) Karel Schulz		All
10	(France) Arthur Dorison		All
11	(France) Alexandre Munoz		2–7
12	(France) Lisa Billard	G	5–7
17	(Belgium) Yani Stevenheydens		All
18	(Germany) Mathilda Paatz		All
20	(Japan) Taito Kato		All
22	(Andorra) Frank Porté Ruiz		All
23	(France) Dylan Estre		All
24	(France) Tom Le Brech		All
26	(Thailand) Rayan Caretti		All
27	(France) Pacôme Weisenburger		1
29	(France) Enzo Caldaras		All
30	(France) Paul Roques		All
33	(France) Augustin Bernier		All
36	(India) Arjun Chheda		1–5, 7
38	(France) Aleksandr Burdo	G	7
46	(United Kingdom) Gabriel Doyle-Parfait		All
61	(France) Louis Schlesser		All
74	(France) Pablo Riccobono Bello	G	6
83	(France) Jules Caranta		All
87	(Republic of Ireland) Alex O'Grady		All
89	(Canada) Jason Leung		All
99	(Germany) Montego Maassen		All

Icon	Status
G	Guest drivers ineligible for Drivers' Championship

== Race calendar ==
French Federation of Automobile Sport published the schedule on 8 January 2024.

Round		Circuit	Date	Pole position	Fastest lap	Winning driver
1	R1	(France) Circuit Paul Armagnac, Nogaro	31 March	(Belgium) Yani Stevenheydens	(Belgium) Yani Stevenheydens	(Belgium) Yani Stevenheydens
1	R2	(France) Circuit Paul Armagnac, Nogaro	31 March	race cancelled due to torrential rain		
1	R3	(France) Circuit Paul Armagnac, Nogaro	1 April	(Belgium) Yani Stevenheydens	(Belgium) Yani Stevenheydens	(France) Jules Caranta (Note: Stevenheydens finished first but received a 5 second time penalty for jumping the start. Caranta inherited the win.)
2	R1	(France) Circuit de Lédenon, Lédenon	11 May	(Luxembourg) Chester Kieffer	(Luxembourg) Chester Kieffer	(Luxembourg) Chester Kieffer
2	R2	(France) Circuit de Lédenon, Lédenon	11 May		(France) Jules Caranta	(Andorra) Frank Porté Ruiz
2	R3	(France) Circuit de Lédenon, Lédenon	12 May	(Japan) Taito Kato	(France) Jules Caranta	(Japan) Taito Kato
3	R1	(Belgium) Circuit de Spa-Francorchamps, Stavelot	22 June	(Belgium) Yani Stevenheydens	(Japan) Taito Kato	(Luxembourg) Chester Kieffer
3	R2	(Belgium) Circuit de Spa-Francorchamps, Stavelot	22 June		(Japan) Taito Kato	(Japan) Taito Kato
3	R3	(Belgium) Circuit de Spa-Francorchamps, Stavelot	23 June	(Belgium) Yani Stevenheydens	(France) Jules Caranta	(France) Jules Caranta
4	R1	(Germany) Nürburgring, Nürburg	27 July	(France) Augustin Bernier	(Thailand) Rayan Caretti	(France) Jules Caranta
4	R2	(Germany) Nürburgring, Nürburg	27 July		(France) Dylan Estre	(Belgium) Yani Stevenheydens
4	R3	(Germany) Nürburgring, Nürburg	28 July	(Belgium) Yani Stevenheydens	(Japan) Taito Kato	(Belgium) Yani Stevenheydens
5	R1	(France) Circuit de Nevers Magny-Cours, Magny-Cours	24 August	(Belgium) Yani Stevenheydens	(Belgium) Yani Stevenheydens	(France) Jules Caranta
5	R2	(France) Circuit de Nevers Magny-Cours, Magny-Cours	24 August		(Belgium) Yani Stevenheydens	(France) Karel Schulz
5	R3	(France) Circuit de Nevers Magny-Cours, Magny-Cours	25 August	(Belgium) Yani Stevenheydens	(Belgium) Yani Stevenheydens	(Belgium) Yani Stevenheydens
6	R1	(France) Dijon-Prenois, Prenois	14 September	(Japan) Taito Kato	(Japan) Taito Kato	(Japan) Taito Kato
6	R2	(France) Dijon-Prenois, Prenois	14 September		(Germany) Montego Maassen	(France) Dylan Estre
6	R3	(France) Dijon-Prenois, Prenois	15 September	(Japan) Taito Kato	(Japan) Taito Kato	(Japan) Taito Kato
7	R1	(France) Circuit Paul Ricard, Le Castellet	5 October	(Belgium) Yani Stevenheydens	(Belgium) Yani Stevenheydens	(Japan) Taito Kato
7	R2	(France) Circuit Paul Ricard, Le Castellet	5 October		(Germany) Montego Maassen	(France) Alexandre Munoz
7	R3	(France) Circuit Paul Ricard, Le Castellet	6 October	(Japan) Taito Kato	(France) Dylan Estre	(United Kingdom) Gabriel Doyle-Parfait

== Championship standings ==
Points were awarded as follows:

Races	Position										Bonus	
Races	1st	2nd	3rd	4th	5th	6th	7th	8th	9th	10th	PP	FL
Races 1 & 3	25	18	15	12	10	8	6	4	2	1	**1**	1
Race 2	15	12	10	8	6	4	2	1			–	1

=== Drivers' standings ===
Pos	Driver	NOG (France)			LÉD (France)			SPA (Belgium)			NÜR (Germany)			MAG (France)			DIJ (France)			LEC (France)			Pts
1	(Japan) Taito Kato	2	C	3	2	5	**1**	2	1	3	8	4	4	3	8	2	**1**	11	**1**	1	5	**9**	280
2	(Belgium) Yani Stevenheydens	**1**	C	**7**	3	2	4	**3**	4	**2**	5	1	**1**	**2**	17	**1**	2	Ret	2	**2**	7	11	274
3	(France) Jules Caranta	3	C	1	4	6	3	4	6	1	1	6	3	1	4	3	5	3	6	3	8	3	266
4	(Luxembourg) Chester Kieffer	10	C	5	**1**	7	2	1	5	4	Ret	20	6	11	10	Ret	10	12	7	15	Ret	14	116
5	(France) Augustin Bernier	15	C	9	7	8	6	9	3	5	**11**	7	5	4	19	5	6	Ret	5	6	6	4	116
6	(Andorra) Frank Porté Ruiz	Ret	C	12	8	1	23†	6	Ret	Ret	3	10	2	19	6	8	3	6	4	8	Ret	6	111
7	(Thailand) Rayan Caretti	5	C	2	5	4	7	5	Ret	6	2	12	21	20	12	6	9	5	8	10	20†	10	111
8	(Germany) Montego Maassen	21	C	8	15	11	11	21	21	17	16	17	24	5	Ret	4	7	2	3	9	3	7	79
9	(France) Dylan Estre	4	C	11	Ret	10	10	11	10	18	12	5	15	Ret	Ret	11	8	1	10	5	10	2	69
10	(United Kingdom) Gabriel Doyle-Parfait	23†	C	19	13	Ret	14	8	8	Ret	4	15	25	16	Ret	DNS	11	7	Ret	7	2	1	62
11	(France) Jules Roussel	9	C	17	6	15	5	10	2	11	7	24	7	18	11	16	4	8	11	14	12	9	60
12	(Republic of Ireland) Alex O'Grady	12	C	22	11	3	8	7	7	Ret	10	3	10	9	7	7	23	17	13	4	11	15	56
13	(Italy) Leonardo Megna	6	C	4	16	14	16	23	15	8	6	11	20	7	3	23†	18	9	19	Ret	9	16	48
14	(France) Enzo Caldaras	16	C	13	12	13	12	13	Ret	10	9	2	8	15	2	9	19	18	9	12	13	13	35
15	(Canada) Jason Leung	7	C	6	10	12	15	17	9	7	24	13	11	8	Ret	Ret	14	4	20	23	14	22	33
16	(France) Karel Schulz	8	C	Ret	14	9	24†	16	11	13	14	14	14	10	1	14	12	20	18	Ret	4	12	28
17	(France) Alexandre Munoz				Ret	22	22	15	16	9	15	9	17	14	9	10	15	13	16	18	1	5	28
18	(France) Arthur Dorison	Ret	C	10	9	Ret	9	12	12	Ret	17	16	9	6	5	13	16	15	12	21	Ret	17	21
19	(France) Édouard Borgna	17	C	15	19	19	17	Ret	14	14	18	8	12	Ret	14	18	20	16	14	17	17	21	1
20	(Germany) Mathilda Paatz	19	C	16	21	17	NC	24†	20	19	20	22	16	12	22	22†	Ret	10	17	Ret	Ret	25	0
21	(France) Roméo Leurs	13	C	18	18	23	19	14	13	15	13	18	13	13	21	12	13	19	Ret	11	16	19	0
22	(France) Tom Le Brech	22	C	21	22†	18	20	22	18	12	19	23	23	21	15	19	Ret	14	15	16	Ret	20	0
23	(France) Louis Schlesser	14	C	14	17	16	13	19	17	20	21	19	18	Ret	13	15	21	22†	23†	13	22†	18	0
24	(India) Arjun Chheda	18	C	20	Ret	20	18	20	19	Ret	23	21	22	17	20	20				19	15	26	0
25	(France) Paul Roques	20	C	Ret	20	21	21	18	22†	16	22	25†	19	22	18	21	Ret	21	Ret	20	21†	23	0
EX	(France) Pacôme Weisenburger	11	C	23†																			–
Guest drivers ineligible to score points
–	(France) Lisa Billard													Ret	16	17	17	23†	22†	22	18	24	–
–	(France) Aleksandr Burdo																			24	19	27	–
–	(France) Pablo Riccobono Bello																22	24†	21				–
Pos	Driver	NOG (France)			LÉD (France)			SPA (Belgium)			NÜR (Germany)			MAG (France)			DIJ (France)			LEC (France)			Pts

Colour	Result
Gold	Winner
Silver	Second place
Bronze	Third place
Green	Points classification
Blue	Non-points classification
Blue	Non-classified finish (NC)
Purple	Retired, not classified (Ret)
Red	Did not qualify (DNQ)
Red	Did not pre-qualify (DNPQ)
Black	Disqualified (DSQ)
White	Did not start (DNS)
White	Withdrew (WD)
White	Race cancelled (C)
Blank	Did not practice (DNP)
Blank	Did not arrive (DNA)
Blank	Excluded (EX)

**Bold** – Pole
Italics – Fastest Lap
† — Did not finish but classified
