= Jules Caranta =

French racing driver (born 2008)

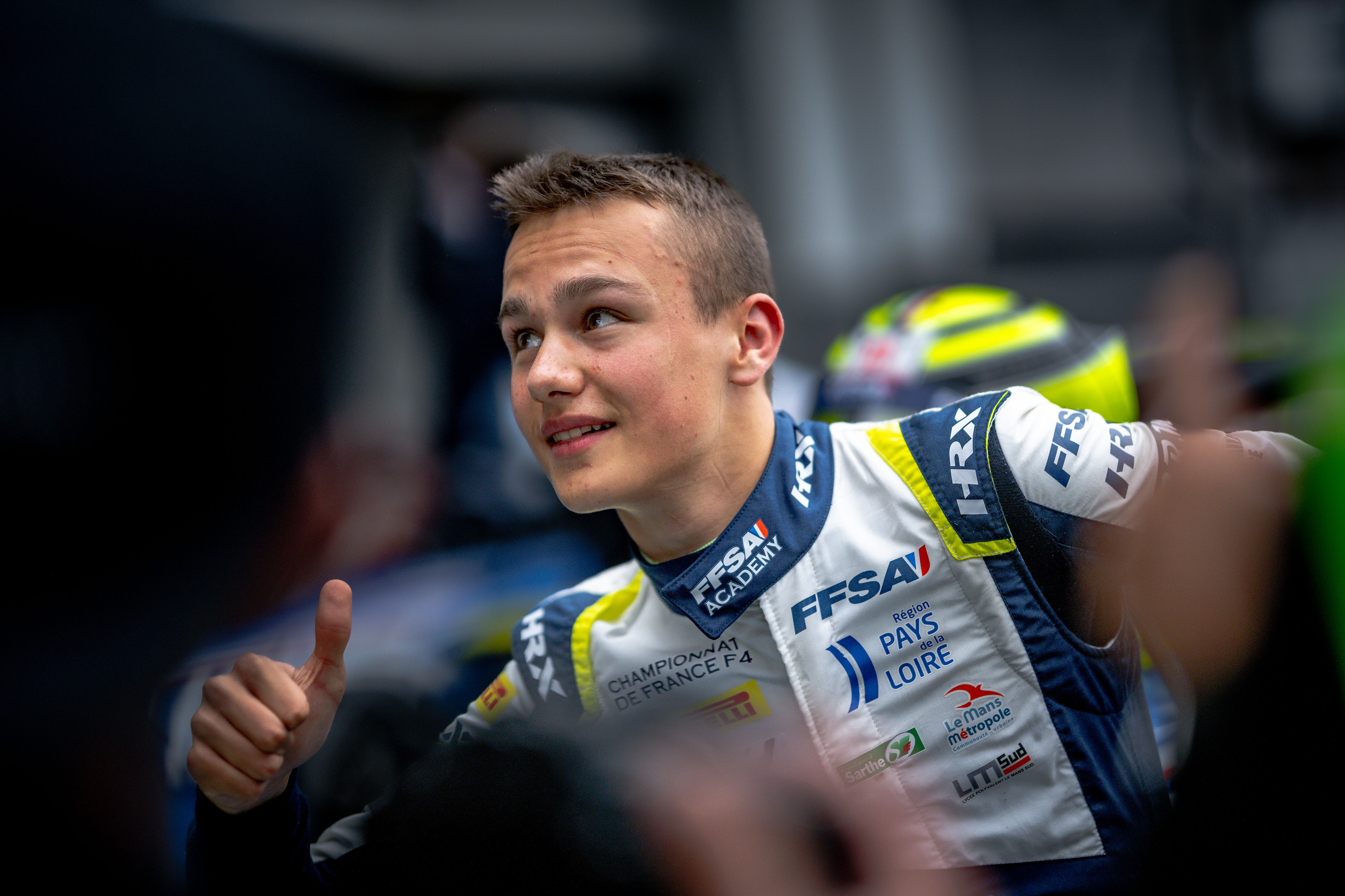
- Caranta at the Nürburgring in 2024
- Nationality: France
- Born: 1 August 2008 (age 18) Saint-Tropez, France

Le Mans Cup career
- Debut season: 2026
- Current team: Nielsen Racing
- Categorisation: FIA Silver
- Car number: 4
- Starts: 4
- Wins: 0
- Podiums: 0
- Poles: 0
- Fastest laps: 0

Previous series
- 2025 2024 2024: Eurocup-3; Eurocup-3 Winter; French F4 Championship; Formula 4 UAE Championship

Jules Caranta (born 1 August 2008) is a French racing driver competing in the LMP3 class of Le Mans Cup for Nielsen Racing. He was a race winner in French F4 in 2024 and a member of the Red Bull Junior Team in 2025, while racing in Eurocup-3.

== Career ==
=== Karting ===
Caranta has an impressive karting record, particularly in the early stages of his career. His first notable karting title came in 2018, when he won the Coupe de France in the Minime category. In 2019, Caranta turned his full attention to the European karting stage, as he joined the Tony Kart Racing Team for a year of WSK championships in the 60 Mini category. After two tough learning years in Europe, Caranta moved up to the OKJ category in 2021, where he made his debut in the WSK Champions Cup. Another tough year followed, and in 2022, he decided to try his hand at IAME karting whilst continuing in the OKJ category. The move worked, and he won his first European title in the IAME Euro Series, winning the title by a considerable margin. Strong results followed, including a 15th-placed finish in the Karting World Championship. For his final year in karting, Caranta moved up to Senior karting in preparation for Formula 4. His spell in Senior karting yielded a best result of 16th, achieved in the Karting World Championship.

=== Formula 4 ===
In early 2024, it was announced that Caranta would be competing in the 2024 Formula 4 UAE Championship with R-ace GP. Just days later, Caranta was also announced to be contesting the French F4 Championship. In the Formula 4 UAE Championship, Caranta had a strong debut round, scoring points in only his second ever single-seater race. Caranta continued with the team for round 2, but moved to Saintéloc Racing for the third round. After scoring points, Caranta returned to R-ace for the rest of the season where he would finish in the top-ten in every race for the final six races. Caranta finished 15th in the standings in a promising first venture into single-seaters. He finished third in the rookie standings.

Caranta emerged as a title contender for the 2024 French F4 Championship after his impressive pre-season. In the first round at Nogaro, he took a third place and his first victory, which placed him in the lead of the standings. His next win came in race 3 in the third round at Spa-Francorchamps, however, by this time his title rivals had already leapfrogged him in the championship standings. Caranta stayed in the fight with two more wins over the course of the season, but it was eventually Honda junior Taito Kato who secured the title, beating Caranta by 14 points. Yani Stevenheydens also finished eight points above Caranta in a tightly contested season where Caranta impressively finished in the top-ten in every race.

=== Eurocup-3 ===
Caranta is set to step up to Eurocup-3 for 2025, joining Campos Racing. He raced with the same team in the Eurocup-3 Spanish Winter Series at the start of the year. He currently sits seventh in the standings with 38 points, his best finish being second in the third race at Jerez.

=== Formula One ===
In September 2024, Red Bull Racing announced that four drivers, including Caranta, would be joining their Junior Team following a driver search where eleven young drivers were assessed at the Circuito de Jerez. He was dropped from the academy after a single year in December 2025.

== Karting record ==
=== Karting career summary ===
Season	Series	Team	Position
2016	National Series Karting - Mini	Sonic Racing Kart	3rd
2016	Championnat de France - Mini	Sonic Racing Kart	20th
2016	Coupe de France - Mini	Sonic Racing Kart	2nd
2016	24H Karting - Mini		6th
2017	National Series Karting - Minime	Sonic Racing Kart	2nd
2017	Coupe de France - Minime	Sonic Racing Kart	3rd
2017	Championnat de France - Minime	Sonic Racing Kart	3rd
2018	WSK Super Master Series - 60 Mini	Praga Junior Team	96th
2018	WSK Open Cup - 60 Mini	Tony Kart Racing Team	NC
2018	WSK Final Cup - 60 Mini	Tony Kart Racing Team	56th
2018	Coupe de France - Minime	Jana Racing	1st
2019	WSK Super Master Series - 60 Mini	Tony Kart Racing Team	45th
2019	WSK Euro Series - 60 Mini	Tony Kart Racing Team	19th
2019	WSK Open Cup - 60 Mini	Tony Kart Racing Team	24th
2019	WSK Final Cup - 60 Mini	Tony Kart Racing Team	19th
2020	WSK Super Master Series - 60 Mini	Tony Kart Racing Team	35th
2020	WSK Euro Series - 60 Mini	Tony Kart Racing Team	26th
2020	WSK Open Cup - 60 Mini	Tony Kart Racing Team	27th
2021	WSK Champions Cup - OKJ	Exprit Racing Team	NC
2021	WSK Super Master Series - OKJ	Exprit Racing Team	42nd
2021	WSK Euro Series - OKJ	Exprit Racing Team	30th
2021	Champions of the Future - OKJ	KR Motorsport	42nd
2021	CIK-FIA European Championship - OKJ	KR Motorsport	51st
2021	CIK-FIA World Championship - OKJ	KR Motorsport	NC
2021	WSK Final Cup - OKJ	KR Motorsport	25th
2022	IAME Winter Cup - X30 Junior	Jana Racing	11th
2022	IAME Euro Series - X30 Junior	Jana Racing	1st
2022	IAME Warriors Final - X30 Junior	Jana Racing	NC
2022	International IAME Games - X30 Senior	Jana Racing	11th
2022	Champions of the Future Winter Series - OKJ	KR Motorsport	36th
2022	Champions of the Future - OKJ	Energy Corse	19th
2022	CIK-FIA European Championship - OKJ	Energy Corse	10th
2022	CIK-FIA World Championship - OKJ	Energy Corse	15th
2022	Italian ACI Championship - X30 Junior		11th
2022	FIA Motorsport Games Sprint - Junior	France	4th
2023	IAME Winter Cup - X30 Senior	Jana Racing	23rd
2023	IAME Euro Series - X30 Senior	Jana Racing	24th
2023	WSK Super Master Series - OK	Energy Corse	83rd
2023	Champions of the Future - OK	Energy Corse	23rd
2023	CIK-FIA European Championship - OK	Energy Corse	28th
2023	CIK-FIA World Championship - OK		16th

== Racing record ==
=== Racing career summary ===
Season	Series	Team	Races	Wins	Poles	F/Laps	Podiums	Points	Position
2024	Formula 4 UAE Championship	R-ace GP	12	0	0	0	0	37	15th
2024	Formula 4 UAE Championship	Saintéloc Racing	3	0	0	0	0	37	15th
2024	French F4 Championship	FFSA Academy	20	4	0	3	11	266	**3rd**
2025	Eurocup-3 Spanish Winter Championship	Campos Racing	8	0	0	1	1	46	7th
2025	Eurocup-3	Campos Racing	18	0	2	0	4	126	6th
2026	Le Mans Cup - LMP3	Nielsen Racing	6	0	0	0	0	27	10th
2026	IMSA VP Racing SportsCar Challenge - LMP3	Forbush Performance	4	2	2	3	3	1250	10th

^{*} Season still in progress.

=== Complete Formula 4 UAE Championship results ===
(key) (Races in bold indicate pole position) (Races in italics indicate fastest lap)

Year	Team	1	2	3	4	5	6	7	8	9	10	11	12	13	14	15	Pos	Points
2024	R-ace GP	YMC1; 1; 16	YMC1; 2; 7	YMC1; 3; 28	YMC2; 1 Ret	YMC2; 2; 13	YMC2; 3; 8				YMC3; 1; 9	YMC3; 2; 8	YMC3; 3; 10	DUB2; 1; 7	DUB2; 2; 7	DUB2; 3; 9	15th	37
2024	Saintéloc Racing							DUB1; 1; 17	DUB1; 2; 12	DUB1; 3; 7							15th	37

=== Complete French F4 Championship results ===
(key) (Races in bold indicate pole position; races in italics indicate fastest lap)

Year	1	2	3	4	5	6	7	8	9	10	11	12	13	14	15	16	17	18	19	20	21	DC	Points
2024	NOG; 1; 3	NOG; 2 C	NOG; 3; 1	LÉD; 1; 4	LÉD; 2; 6	LÉD; 3; 3	SPA; 1; 4	SPA; 2; 6	SPA; 3; 1	NÜR; 1; 1	NÜR; 2; 6	NÜR; 3; 3	MAG; 1; 1	MAG; 2; 4	MAG; 3; 3	DIJ; 1; 5	DIJ; 2; 3	DIJ; 3; 6	LEC; 1; 3	LEC; 2; 8	LEC; 3; 3	3rd	266

=== Complete Eurocup-3 Spanish Winter Championship results ===
(key) (Races in bold indicate pole position) (Races in italics indicate fastest lap)

Year	Team	1	2	3	4	5	6	7	8	DC	Points
2025	Campos Racing	JER; 1; 7	JER; 2; 10	JER; 3; 2	POR; 1; 10	POR; 2; 6	POR; 3; 11	ARA; 1; 7	ARA; 2; 8	7th	46

=== Complete Eurocup-3 results ===
(key) (Races in bold indicate pole position) (Races in italics indicate fastest lap)

Year	Team	1	2	3	4	5	6	7	8	9	10	11	12	13	14	15	16	17	18	DC	Points
2025	Campos Racing	RBR; 1; 17	**RBR**; **2**; 3	POR; 1; 4	POR; SR; 22	POR; 2; 2	LEC; 1; 10	LEC; SR; 18	LEC; 2; 15	MNZ; 1; 5	**MNZ**; **2**; 10	ASS; 1; 29†	ASS; 2; 8	SPA; 1; 5	SPA; 2; 7	JER; 1; 2	JER; 2; 8	CAT; 1; 3	CAT; 2; 6	6th	126

=== Complete Le Mans Cup results ===
(key) (Races in bold indicate pole position; results in italics indicate fastest lap)

Year	Entrant	Class	Chassis	1	2	3	4	5	6	Rank	Points
2026	Nielsen Racing	LMP3	Duqueine D09	BAR; 18	LEC; 9	LMS; 5	SPA; 5	SIL; 14	POR; Ret	10th	27

^{*} Season still in progress.
