= Taito Kato =

Japanese racing driver (born 2007)

- 加藤 大翔
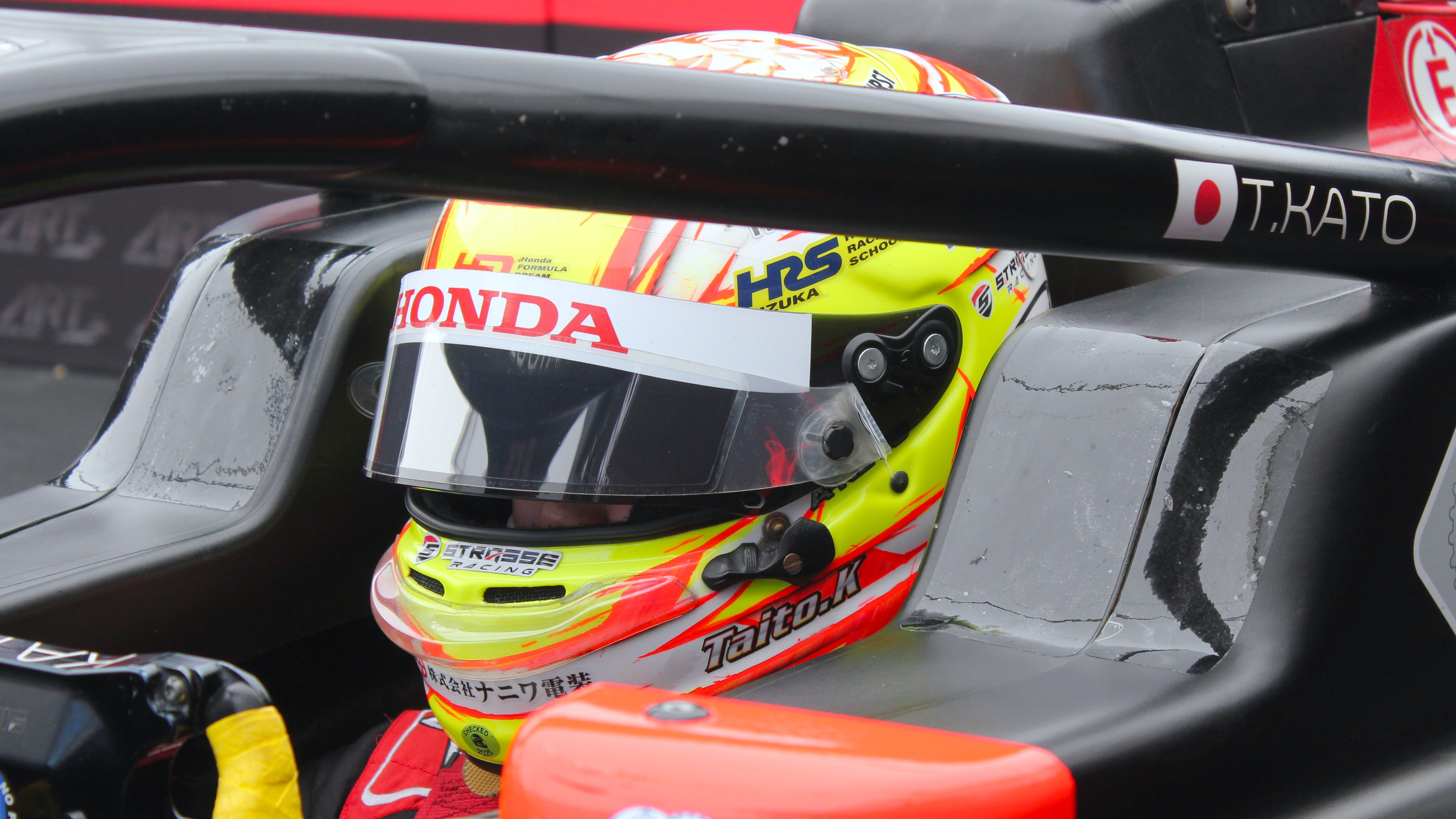
- Kato in 2025
- Born: 25 November 2007 (age 18); Taki, Mie, Japan
- Nationality: (Japan) Japanese

FIA Formula 3 Championship career
- Debut season: 2026
- Current team: ART Grand Prix
- Starts: 19
- Wins: 1
- Podiums: 4
- Poles: 1
- Fastest laps: 0
- Best finish: 4th in 2026

Previous series
- 2025; 2025–2026; 2024: FR European; FR Middle East; French F4

Championship titles
- 2024: French F4
- Statistics up to date as of 18 September 2026.

Taito Kato (Japanese: 加藤 大翔, Hepburn: Katō Taito; born 25 November 2007) is a Japanese racing driver who last competed in the FIA Formula 3 Championship for ART Grand Prix as part of the Honda Formula Dream Project.

Born and raised in Taki, Mie, Kato is the 2024 French F4 champion. He moved up to the Formula Regional European Championship with ART Grand Prix in 2025, finishing seventh overall.

== Career ==
=== Karting ===
Kato mainly karted in Japan, but made his debut overseas in 2022 by competing in a single round of the FFSA Karting Championship as a guest driver. He finished second in the finale but was not classified in the overall standings. Kato also competed in the South Garda Winter Cup in 2023, finishing 12th in the finale of the OK category.

=== Formula 4 ===
In 2024, Kato appeared on the entry list of the 2024 French F4 Championship, under the wing of the Honda Formula Dream Project. He scored two podiums from two races on his debut weekend at Nogaro, establishing himself as a title contender. In the following weekend at Lédenon, Kato secured his first victory after starting race three from pole position. Kato then scored his second win and finished all three races on the podium in round three at Spa-Francorchamps. Kato continued to fight for the championship, and with three more victories following suit, Kato was crowned French F4 champion after a controversial conclusion to the 2024 season. Despite this intense battle for the title, Kato commented that himself and fellow title contender Yani Stevenheydens "respected each other" during the championship fight.

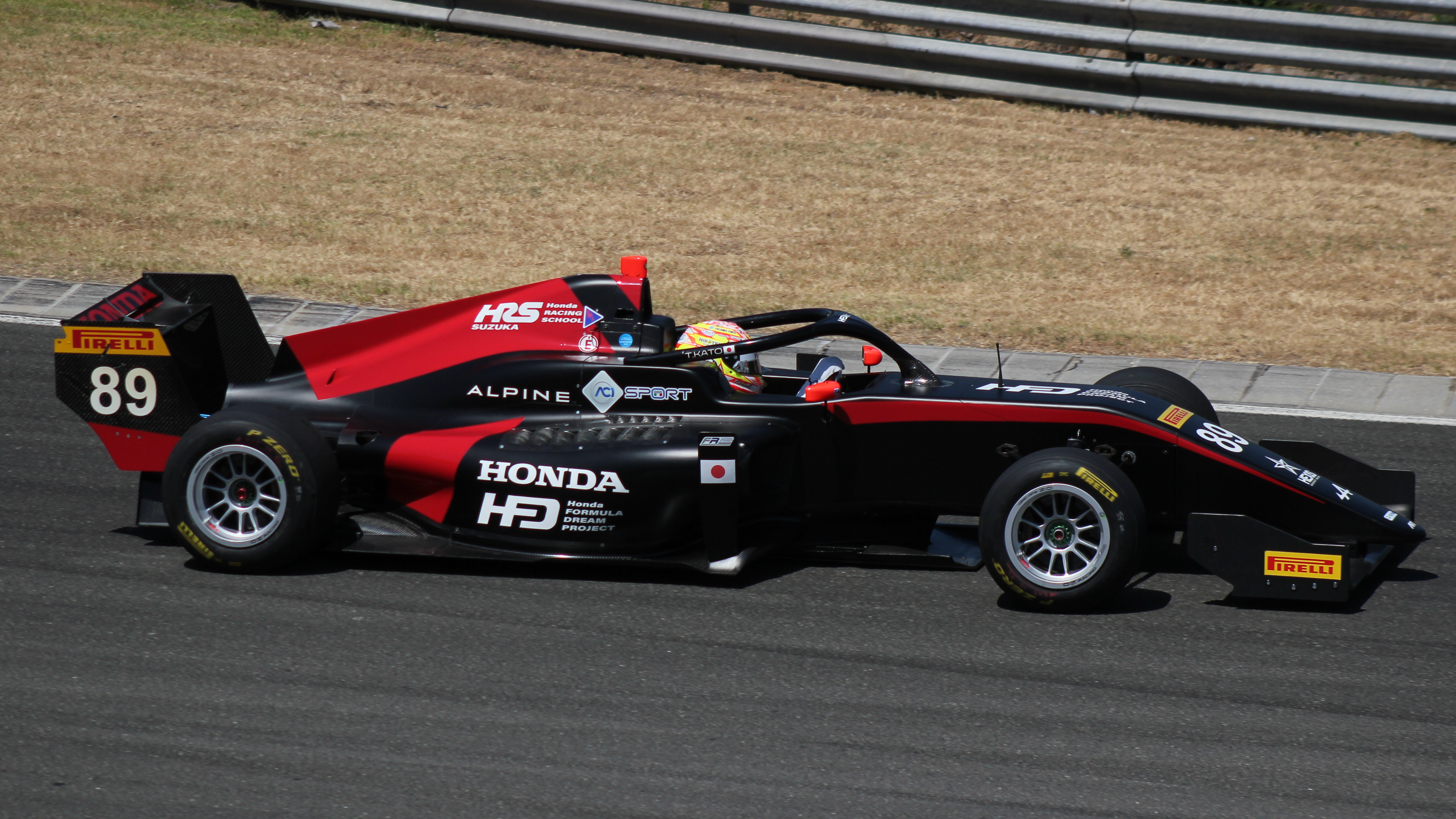
Taito Kato driving for ART Grand Prix during the 2025 Formula Regional European Championship by Alpine season.

=== Formula Regional ===
==== 2025 ====
In 2024, after his successes in Formula 4, Kato was announced to be competing in the 2025 Formula Regional European Championship and 2025 Formula Regional Middle East Championship with ART Grand Prix.

==== 2026 ====
In preparation for his Formula 3 campaign, Kato competed in the opening three rounds of the Formula Regional Middle East Trophy with ART Grand Prix.

At the end of November, Kato competed with ART in the Macau Grand Prix.

=== FIA Formula 3 ===
In 2026, Kato moved up to Formula 3 for 2026 with ART Grand Prix, alongside Kanato Le and Maciej Gładysz.

== Karting record ==
=== Karting career summary ===
Season	Series	Team	Position
2015	SL Biwako Series - KID'S	HIGUCHI RT	1st
2016	SL Rainbow Series - Cadets	HKC	3rd
2017	SL Biwako Series - Cadets	HKC	1st
2018	All-Japan Junior Karting Championship - FP-Jr Cadets	FA-KART RT+HKC	5th
2018	Suzuka Championship Series - FP-Jr Cadets	FA-KART RT+HKC	1st
2019	JAF Junior Karting Championship - FP-Jr	FA-KART RT+HKC	3rd
2020	Suzuka Championship Series - Junior Max	SRS Kotira Racing	3rd
2020	ROTAX Max Series - Junior Max	HRS JAPAN	25th
2020	EXGEL NEXT CUP	HRS JAPAN	?
2021	All-Japan Karting Championship - FS-125	HRS JAPAN	2nd
2022	EXGEL OK CHAMP Series	HRS JAPAN	1st
2022	All-Japan Karting Championship - OK	PONOS HIROTEX RACING	7th
2022	FFSA Karting Championship - Junior		NC†
2023	South Garda Winter Cup - OK	Ward Racing	12th

== Racing record ==
=== Racing career summary ===
Season	Series	Team	Races	Wins	Poles	F/Laps	Podiums	Points	Position
2024	French F4 Championship	FFSA Academy	20	5	4	5	12	280	**1st**
2025	Formula Regional Middle East Championship	ART Grand Prix	15	0	0	0	1	75	12th
2025	Formula Regional European Championship	ART Grand Prix	20	0	0	0	2	107	7th
2025	Macau Grand Prix	ART Grand Prix	1	0	0	0	0	—N/a	5th
2026	Formula Regional Middle East Trophy	ART Grand Prix	8	1	1	0	1	49	11th
2026	FIA Formula 3 Championship	ART Grand Prix	19	1	1	0	4	105	4th
2026	Macau Grand Prix	ART Grand Prix	0	0	0	0	0	—N/a	TBD

* Season still in progress.

=== Complete French F4 Championship results ===
(key) (Races in bold indicate pole position; races in italics indicate fastest lap)

Year	1	2	3	4	5	6	7	8	9	10	11	12	13	14	15	16	17	18	19	20	21	DC	Points
2024	NOG; 1; 2	NOG; 2 C	NOG; 3; 3	LÉD; 1; 2	LÉD; 2; 5	**LÉD**; **3**; 1	SPA; 1; 2	SPA; 2; 1	SPA; 3; 3	NÜR; 1; 8	NÜR; 2; 4	NÜR; 3; 4	MAG; 1; 3	MAG; 2; 8	MAG; 3; 2	**DIJ**; **1**; 1	DIJ; 2; 11	**DIJ**; **3**; 1	LEC; 1; 1	LEC; 2; 5	**LEC**; **3**; 9	1st	280

=== Complete Formula Regional Middle East Championship/Trophy results ===
(key) (Races in bold indicate pole position) (Races in italics indicate fastest lap)

Year	Entrant	1	2	3	4	5	6	7	8	9	10	11	12	13	14	15	DC	Points
2025	ART Grand Prix	YMC1; 1; 6	YMC1; 2; 14	YMC1; 3; 7	YMC2; 1; 3	YMC2; 2; 22	YMC2; 3; 18	DUB; 1; 9	DUB; 2; 12	DUB; 3; 10	YMC3; 1; 11	YMC3; 2; 12	YMC3; 3; 6	LUS; 1; 7	LUS; 2; 6	LUS; 3; 13	12th	75
2026	ART Grand Prix	YMC1; 1; 5	YMC1; 2 Ret	YMC1; 3 DNS	YMC2; 1; 14	YMC2; 2; 11	YMC2; 3; 8	**DUB**; **1**; 1	DUB; 2; 11	DUB; 3; 5	LUS; 1	LUS; 2	LUS; 3				11th	49

=== Complete Formula Regional European Championship results ===
(key) (Races in bold indicate pole position) (Races in italics indicate fastest lap)

Year	Team	1	2	3	4	5	6	7	8	9	10	11	12	13	14	15	16	17	18	19	20	DC	Points
2025	ART Grand Prix	MIS; 1; 5	MIS; 2; 17	SPA; 1; 10	SPA; 2; 3	ZAN; 1; 15	ZAN; 2; 8	HUN; 1; 12	HUN; 2; 9	LEC; 1; 3	LEC; 2; 13	IMO; 1; 6	IMO; 2; 8	RBR; 1; 14	RBR; 2; 14	CAT; 1; 6	CAT; 2; 8	HOC; 1; 9	HOC; 2; 6	MNZ; 1; 4	MNZ; 2; 4	7th	107

=== Complete Macau Grand Prix results ===
Year	Team	Car	Qualifying	Quali Race	Main Race
2025	(France) ART Grand Prix	Tatuus F3 T-318	4th	5th	5th
2026	(France) ART Grand Prix	Tatuus T-326	TBD	TBD	TBD

=== Complete FIA Formula 3 Championship results ===
(key) (Races in bold indicate pole position) (Races in italics indicate fastest lap)

Year	Entrant	1	2	3	4	5	6	7	8	9	10	11	12	13	14	15	16	17	18	19	DC	Points
2026	ART Grand Prix	MEL; SPR; 5	MEL; FEA; 3	MON; SPR; 16	MON; FEA; 11	CAT; SPR; 15	CAT; FEA; 9	RBR; SPR; 7	RBR; FEA; 6	SIL; SPR; 18	SIL; FEA; 25	SPA; SPR; 5	SPA; FEA; 6	HUN; SPR; 14	HUN; FEA; 13	MNZ; SPR; 1	MNZ; FEA; 3	MAD; SPR; 9	**MAD**; **FEA1**; 2	MAD; FEA2; 4	4th	105

== Notes ==
Sporting positions
Preceded by Evan Giltaire	French F4 Championship; Champion; 2024	Succeeded by Alexandre Munoz
