= Louis Iglesias =

French racing driver (born 2008)

- Iglesias at Silverstone Circuit in 2026.
- Nationality: (France) French
- Born: 17 March 2008 (age 18) Brignoles, France
- Relatives: Yannick Iglesias (father); Jérémy Iglesias (uncle)

European Le Mans Series career
- Debut season: 2026
- Current team: CLX Motorsport
- Categorisation: FIA Silver
- Car number: 17
- Starts: 4
- Wins: 3
- Podiums: 4
- Poles: 3
- Fastest laps: 3
- Best finish: 2nd (LMP3) in 2026

Awards
- 2026: ELMS Rookie of the Year

Louis Iglesias (born 17 March 2008) is a French racing driver who last competed in the LMP3 class of the Le Mans Cup for ANS Motorsport.

== Personal life ==
Iglesias is the son of Yannick Iglesias, a former karting driver who manages the Brignoles Karting track and the Kart In Pro Competition team. His uncle Jérémy is also a karting driver, who has been racing competitively in karts since 1994, most notably winning the 2020 Karting World Championship in the KZ class. He is a protégé of Formula One driver Charles Leclerc.

== Career ==
Iglesias began karting in 2013. Starting out in Mini karts, Iglesias won the Coupe de France and the French Championship in 2017, receiving an invitation to compete in the RMC Grand Finals later that year, which he won in Micro Max. The following year, Iglesias joined Formula E team Venturi Racing's newly-created junior programme, a year in which he finished third in the National Series Karting's Cadet standings. After a year for Praga Racing Team in WSK-organized championships in 60 Mini, which yielded a lone pole in the WSK Open Cup, Iglesias returned to National Series Karting for 2020, once again finishing third in the Cadet points.

Two years in junior karting then ensued, in which Iglesias won the National Series Karting, Coupe de France and French titles in 2022, as well as a shootout to compete in the inaugural Monaco E-Karting Championship's EK2 Junior class the same year. After racing in the RMC Grand Finals, it was announced that Iglesias would join CRG Racing Team for his step-up to senior karting the following year. In his two-year stint with the team, Iglesias finished eighth in the Karting World Championship in his rookie year, before securing fourth in the Karting European Championship standings in 2024.

In 2025, Iglesias stepped up to single-seaters, racing in the FFSA Academy centrally-run French F4 Championship with backing from the Winfield Racing School. Starting off the season with third-place finishes at the Nogaro and Dijon rounds, Iglesias took his maiden pole position for race one at Magny-Cours, before finishing third in race three. Iglesias then ended the season with his only win of the season in race one at Le Mans from pole, en route to a sixth-place points finish.

The following year, Iglesias switched to sportscar racing, joining ANS Motorsport to compete in the LMP3 class of the Le Mans Cup, as a new inductee to the CLX Academy. At the second round of the season at Le Castellet, Iglesias took a commanding pole and recovered from 18th to third in the race after damage. Although a penalty for overtaking off-track cost him the podium, Iglesias made headlines, having lapped 1.3 seconds faster than any other driver during his stint. Iglesias stated he was "enjoying" his transition to LMP3, commenting "the downforce, the braking, the weight of the car [...] is on another level" compared to Formula 4. Following that, Iglesias took his second pole and his first podium at Spa, prior to his only win of the season at Silverstone as he ended the season fourth overall. During 2026, Iglesias joined CLX mid-season to compete in the European Le Mans Series, winning on debut at Imola from pole and inherited the win at Spa, before winning the finale at Algarve to end second in points and clinch the ELMS Rookie of the Year award. Towards the end of the year, Iglesias partook in the ELMS rookie tests for CLX Motorsport in LMP2 machinery. Iglesias then remained with CLX to compete with them in the LMP3 class of the 2026–27 Asian Le Mans Cup with Laurent Wuthrich.

== Karting record ==
=== Karting career summary ===
Season	Series	Team	Position
2015	Championnat Regional Pacac — Mini Kart		14th
2015	French Championship — Mini Kart	Kart In Pro Competition	13th
2016	National Series Karting — Mini Kart	Kart In Pro Competition	2nd
2016	French Championship — Mini Kart	Kart In Pro Competition	5th
2017	National Series Karting — Minime	Kart In Pro Competition	9th
2017	Coupe de France — Minime	Kart In Pro Competition	1st
2017	French Championship — Minime	Kart In Pro Competition	1st
2017	RMC Grand Finals — Micro Max	Yannick Iglesias	1st
2018	National Series Karting — Cadet	Kart In Pro Competition	3rd
2018	Coupe de France — Cadet	Kart In Pro Competition	24th
2018	French Championship — Cadet	Kart In Pro Competition	5th
2019	WSK Super Master Series — 60 Mini	Praga Racing Team	41st
2019	WSK Euro Series — 60 Mini	Praga Racing Team	38th
2019	WSK Open Cup — 60 Mini	Praga Racing Team	20th
2019	WSK Final Cup — 60 Mini	Praga Racing Team	12th
2020	National Series Karting — Cadet	Kart In Pro Competition	3rd
2021	National Series Karting — Nationale	Kart In Pro Competition	28th
2021	French Championship — Nationale	Kart In Pro Competition	5th
2022	National Series Karting — Nationale	Kart In Pro Competition	1st
2022	Coupe de France — Nationale	Kart In Pro Competition	1st
2022	French Championship — Nationale	Kart In Pro Competition	1st
2022	RMC Grand Finals — Junior Max	Yannick Iglesias	46th
2023	WSK Super Master Series — OK	CRG Racing Team	18th
2023	Champions of the Future Euro Series — OK	CRG Racing Team	14th
2023	Karting European Championship — OK	CRG Racing Team	33rd
2023	WSK Euro Series — OK	CRG Racing Team	24th
2023	Karting World Championship — OK	CRG Racing Team	8th
2024	WSK Super Master Series — OK	CRG Racing Team	33rd
2024	Champions of the Future Euro Series — OK	CRG Racing Team	32nd
2024	Karting European Championship — OK	CRG Racing Team	4th

== Racing record ==
=== Racing career summary ===
Season	Series	Team	Races	Wins	Poles	F/Laps	Podiums	Points	Position
2025	French F4 Championship	FFSA Academy	18	1	2	1	4	111	6th
2026	Le Mans Cup – LMP3	ANS Motorsport	6	1	2	3	2	57	4th
2026	European Endurance Prototype Cup	ANS Motorsport	1	0	0	0	0	0*	NC*
2026	Ligier European Series – JS2 R	ANS Motorsport	1	0	0	0	1	0	NC†
2026	European Le Mans Series – LMP3	CLX Motorsport	4	3	3	2	4	96	**2nd**
2026–27	Asian Le Mans Cup – LMP3	CLX Motorsport							

^{*} Season still in progress.

=== Complete French F4 Championship results ===
(key) (Races in bold indicate pole position) (Races in italics indicate fastest lap)

Year	1	2	3	4	5	6	7	8	9	10	11	12	13	14	15	16	17	18	DC	Points
2025	NOG; 1; 8	NOG; 2; 9	NOG; 3; 3	DIJ; 1; 5	DIJ; 2; 3	DIJ; 3; 12	SPA; 1; 5	SPA; 2; 7	SPA; 3 Ret	**MAG**; **1** Ret	MAG; 2; 25†	MAG; 3; 3	LÉD; 1; 20	LÉD; 2; 5	LÉD; 3; 10	**LMS**; **1**; 1	LMS; 2; 6	LMS; 3; 7	6th	111

=== Complete Le Mans Cup results ===
(key) (Races in bold indicate pole position) (Races in italics indicate the fastest lap)

Year	Entrant	Car	Class	1	2	3	4	5	6	DC	Points
2026	ANS Motorsport	Ligier JS P325	LMP3	BAR; 19	**LEC**; 4	LMS; 10	**SPA**; 3	SIL; 1	POR; 11	4th	57

^{*} Season still in progress.

=== Complete European Le Mans Series results ===
(key) (Races in bold indicate pole position; results in italics indicate fastest lap)

Year	Entrant	Class	Chassis	Engine	1	2	3	4	5	6	Rank	Points
2026	CLX Motorsport	LMP3	Ligier JS P325	Toyota V35A 3.5 L V6	CAT	LEC	**IMO**; 1	SPA; 1	SIL; 2	ALG; 1	2nd	96

^{*} Season still in progress.
