= Lisa Billard =

French racing driver (born 2009)

- Billard at the 2026 Dutch Grand Prix
- Nationality: France
- Born: 12 September 2009 (age 17) Normandy, France

F1 Academy career
- Debut season: 2025
- Current team: ART Grand Prix
- Car number: 14
- Former teams: Hitech TGR
- Starts: 14
- Wins: 0
- Podiums: 1
- Poles: 0
- Fastest laps: 0
- Best finish: 26th in 2025
- Statistics up to date as of 13 November 2026.

French F4 Championship career
- Debut season: 2025
- Current team: FFSA Academy
- Starts: 18
- Wins: 0
- Podiums: 0
- Poles: 0
- Fastest laps: 0
- Best finish: 19th in 2025

Lisa Billard (born 12 September 2009) is a French racing driver who competes in F1 Academy for ART Grand Prix with support from Gatorade.

Billard was formerly part of the Alpine Rac(H)er programme. She is supported by the Iron Dames, as well as the French Federation of Automobile Sport. She made her single-seater racing debut in the 2024 French F4 Championship.

== Career ==
=== Karting ===
==== 2018 ====
Billard started karting at the age of seven. Billard first joined the national scene in 2018, in the National Series Karting in France. She finished 22nd in the standings.

==== 2019 ====
Billard impressed in 2019, finishing all of her national competitions in the top-ten in the standings. She came third in the Coupe de France in the Minime category, beating the likes of Pacôme Weisenburger and Arthur Dorison, who she competed against in the following years.

==== 2020 ====
2020 was a quiet year for Billard, as she joined two European competitions. She came 24th in the International IAME Games, and ninth in the Rotax Max Challenge International Trophy, both in the Mini category.

==== 2021 ====
In 2021, Billard drove in both national and international karting championships, as she transitioned to Junior karting as the year went on. She had a best championship result of 13th in the Coupe de France, driving for Kart Pro Racing.

==== 2022 ====
Billard entered three well-known championships in 2022, finishing fifth in the Championnat de France, eighth in the Nationale Series Karting, and 31st in the Rotax Max Challenge International Trophy, all in Junior categories.

==== 2023 ====
Billard's 2023 was a huge breakthrough in her career. She managed to clinch her first championship podium since 2019, after finishing third in the Championnat de France, just seven points off the championship leader. She then moved on to the Academy Trophy, representing France. She finished an impressive seventh in the championship, finishing on the podium in the final event at Cremona.

Billard was one of eight drivers selected for the FIA Girls on Track Rising Stars initiative.

=== Formula 4 ===
Billard made her single-seater debut in the latter half of 2024, joining the French F4 Championship from Round 5 onwards. She secured a best result of 16th from her nine races ahead of an anticipated fully-fledged 2025 effort.

In the 2025 French F4 Championship, Billard's best finish in the series was ninth in Round 3 of the series, taking place at the Circuit de Spa-Francorchamps. After competing in all six rounds, she finished the season 19th in the standings, scoring two points. Billard also claimed the Female Trophy title at season's end.

=== Formula One ===
In January 2023, Alpine announced that Billard would be joining a new program aimed at supporting young female drivers in motorsport, the Rac(H)er programme. She joined the scheme alongside five other young female prodigies, including Abbi Pulling and Sophia Flörsch.

=== F1 Academy ===
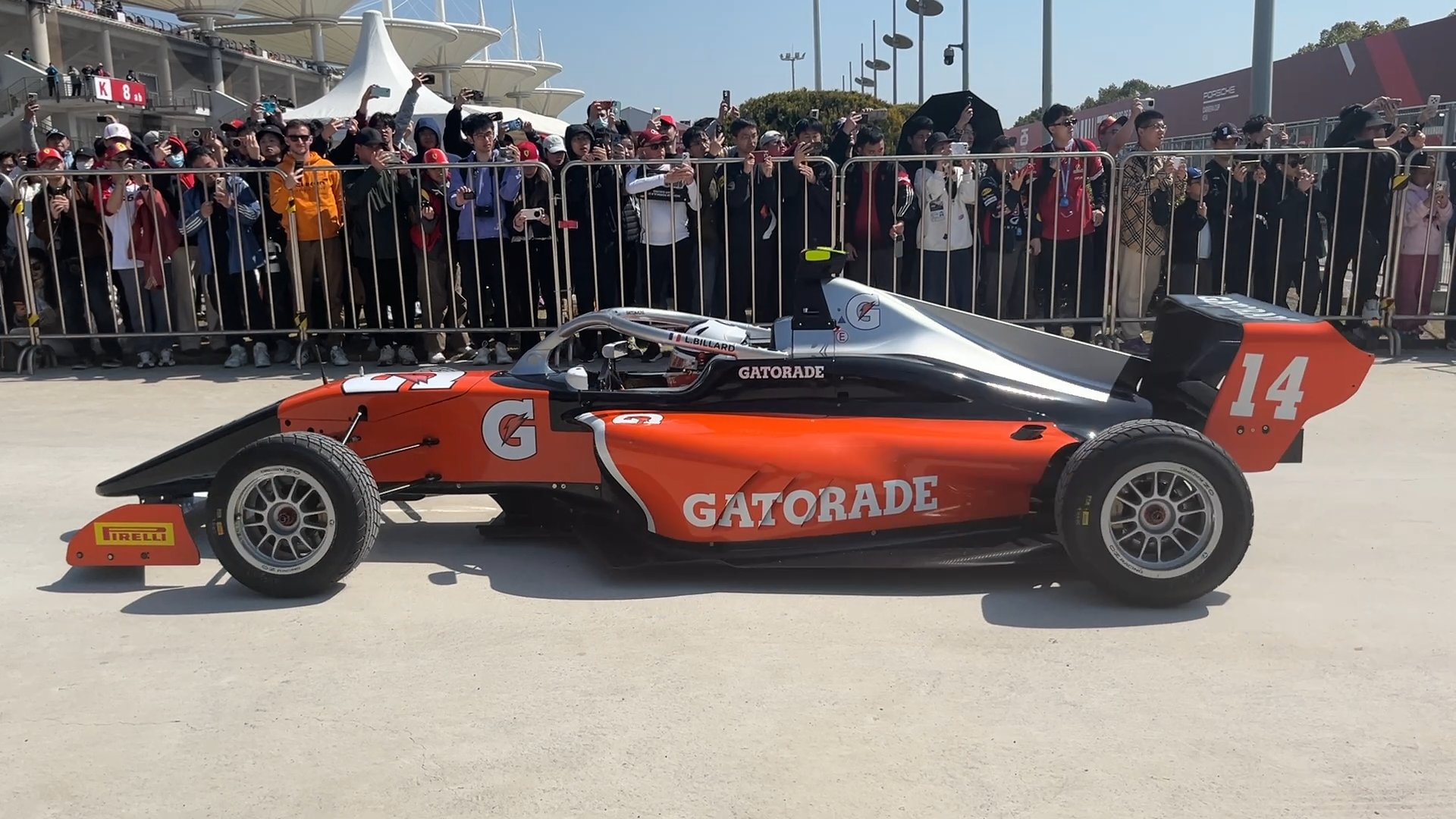
Billard driving at the 2026 F1 Academy Shanghai round

Billard was selected to participate in F1 Academy's rookie test in September 2025 at Circuito de Navarra, along with 17 other female drivers. The test spotlights young female talent and provides an opportunity to showcase their skills, with the goal of securing a full-time seat or Wild Card entry in the F1 Academy championship. Billard finished the rookie test with the second fastest overall time, behind British driver Ella Stevens.

On 1 October 2025, Billard was announced as the Wild Card entry for Round 6 of the championship, taking place at the same weekend of the Singapore Grand Prix. She made her F1 Academy debut at the Marina Bay Circuit, racing with the number 60 car from the Hitech TGR team. She qualified for Race 1 in fifth, and was the first Wild Card entry to ever qualify in the top-eight. After a collision with Alba Larsen, Billard sustained damage and had to retire from the race.

Billard currently races for ART Grand Prix in the 2026 F1 Academy season, with a full-time seat backed by Gatorade.

Billard has placed her first podium in the 2026 F1 Academy season with 3rd at the Circuit of the Americas.

== Karting record ==
=== Karting career summary ===
Season	Series	Team	Position
2018	National Series Karting - Minime	Energy Corse	22nd
2018	Championnat de France - Minime	HEK	25th
2019	National Series Karting - Minime		10th
2019	Coupe de France - Minime	Kart Pro Racing	3rd
2019	IAME International Final - Mini Cadet		8th
2020	IAME International Games - X30 Mini	Kart Pro Racing	24th
2020	Rotax Max Challenge International Trophy - Mini Max	Billard David	9th
2021	IAME Euro Series - X30 Mini	Kart Pro Racing	67th
2021	National Series Karting - Nationale	Kart Pro Racing	27th
2021	Rotax Max Challenge International Trophy - Mini Max	Billard David	17th
2021	Championnat de France - Nationale	Kart Pro Racing	59th
2021	Coupe de France - Nationale	Kart Pro Racing	13th
2021	Rotax Max Euro Golden Trophy - Rotax Junior	Billard David	NC
2022	Championnat de France - Nationale		5th
2022	Nationale Series Karting - Nationale	Kart Pro Racing	8th
2022	Rotax Max Challenge International Trophy - Rotax Junior	Kart Pro Racing	31st
2023	South Garda Winter Cup - OKJ	Billard David	21st
2023	WSK Super Master Series - OKJ	Billard David	101st
2023	Championnat de France - Nationale		3rd
2023	Champions of the Future - OKJ	Matec Competition	98th
2023	CIK-FIA Academy Trophy - Academy		7th

== Racing record ==
=== Racing career summary ===
Season	Series	Team	Races	Wins	Poles	F/Laps	Podiums	Points	Position
2024	French F4 Championship	FFSA Academy	9	0	0	0	0	0	NC†
2025	French F4 Championship	FFSA Academy	18	0	0	0	0	2	19th
2025	F1 Academy	Hitech TGR	2	0	0	0	0	0	26th
2026	F1 Academy	ART Grand Prix	14	0	0	0	1	41	9th
2026	French F4 Championship	FFSA Academy	12	0	0	0	0	0	NC†

=== Complete French F4 Championship results ===
(key) (Races in bold indicate pole position; races in italics indicate fastest lap)

Year	1	2	3	4	5	6	7	8	9	10	11	12	13	14	15	16	17	18	19	20	21	DC	Points
2024	NOG; 1	NOG; 2	NOG; 3	LÉD; 1	LÉD; 2	LÉD; 3	SPA; 1	SPA; 2	SPA; 3	NÜR; 1	NÜR; 2	NÜR; 3	MAG; 1 Ret	MAG; 2; 16	MAG; 3; 17	DIJ; 1; 17	DIJ; 2; 23†	DIJ; 3; 22†	LEC; 1; 22	LEC; 2; 18	LEC; 3; 24	NC†	0
2025	NOG; 1; 26	NOG; 2; 17	NOG; 3; 19	DIJ; 1; 11	DIJ; 2; 13	DIJ; 3; 23	SPA; 1; 11	SPA; 2; 15	SPA; 3; 9	MAG; 1 Ret	MAG; 2; 16	MAG; 3; 16	LÉD; 1; 12	LÉD; 2; 14	LÉD; 3 Ret	LMS; 1; 13	LMS; 2; 9	LMS; 3; 11				19th	2
2026	NOG; 1; 9	NOG; 2; 8	NOG; 3; 16	DIJ; 1 Ret	DIJ; 2; 16	DIJ; 3; 13	SPA; 1; 12	SPA; 2; 14	SPA; 3; 8	MAG; 1; 13	MAG; 2; 10	MAG; 3; 15	LÉD; 1	LÉD; 2	LÉD; 3	LEC; 1	LEC; 2	LEC; 3				NC†	0

^{†} As Billard was a guest driver, she was ineligible to score points.

=== Complete F1 Academy results ===
(key) (Races in bold indicate pole position) (Races in italics indicate fastest lap)

Year	Entrant	1	2	3	4	5	6	7	8	9	10	11	12	13	14	15	DC	Points
2025	Hitech TGR	SHA; 1	SHA; 2	JED; 1	JED; 2	MIA; 1	MIA; 2	MTL; 1	MTL; 2	MTL; 3	ZAN; 1	ZAN; 2	SIN; 1 Ret	SIN; 2; 16	LVG; 1	LVG; 2	26th	0
2026	ART Grand Prix	SHA; 1; 8	SHA; 2; 7	MTL; 1; 15	MTL; 2; 5	MTL; 3; 15	SIL; 1; 6	SIL; 2; 14	ZAN; 1; 10	ZAN; 2; 12	COA; 1; 4	COA; 2; 3	COA; 3; 6	LVG; 1	LVG; 2		12th*	12*
