= 2026 Macau Grand Prix =

73rd running of the Macau Grand Prix

Race details
- Date: 22 November 2026
- Official name: 73rd Macau Grand Prix – FIA FR World Cup
- Location: Guia Circuit, Macau
- Course: Temporary street circuit
- Course length: 6.120 km (3.803 mi)
- Distance: 15 laps, 91.800 km (57.042 mi)
- Weather: Dry and clear

Pole position
Driver	(United Arab Emirates) Rashid Al Dhaheri	R-ace GP

Fastest lap
Driver	(Argentina) Mattia Colnaghi	MP Motorsport
- Time: 2:15.143 on lap 12

Podium
First	(United Kingdom) Kean Nakamura-Berta	SJM Theodore Racing
Second	(Australia) Alex Ninovic	Rodin Motorsport
Third	(United Arab Emirates) Rashid Al Dhaheri	R-ace GP

The 2026 Macau Grand Prix (formally the 73rd Macau Grand Prix – FIA FR World Cup) was a motor race for Formula Regional cars held on the streets of Macau on 22 November 2026. The race itself was made up of two races: a qualifying race was first held to decide the starting grid for the fifteen-lap main event. The 2026 race was the 73rd running of the Macau Grand Prix, the third for Formula Regional cars and the third FIA FR World Cup.

== Background and entry list ==
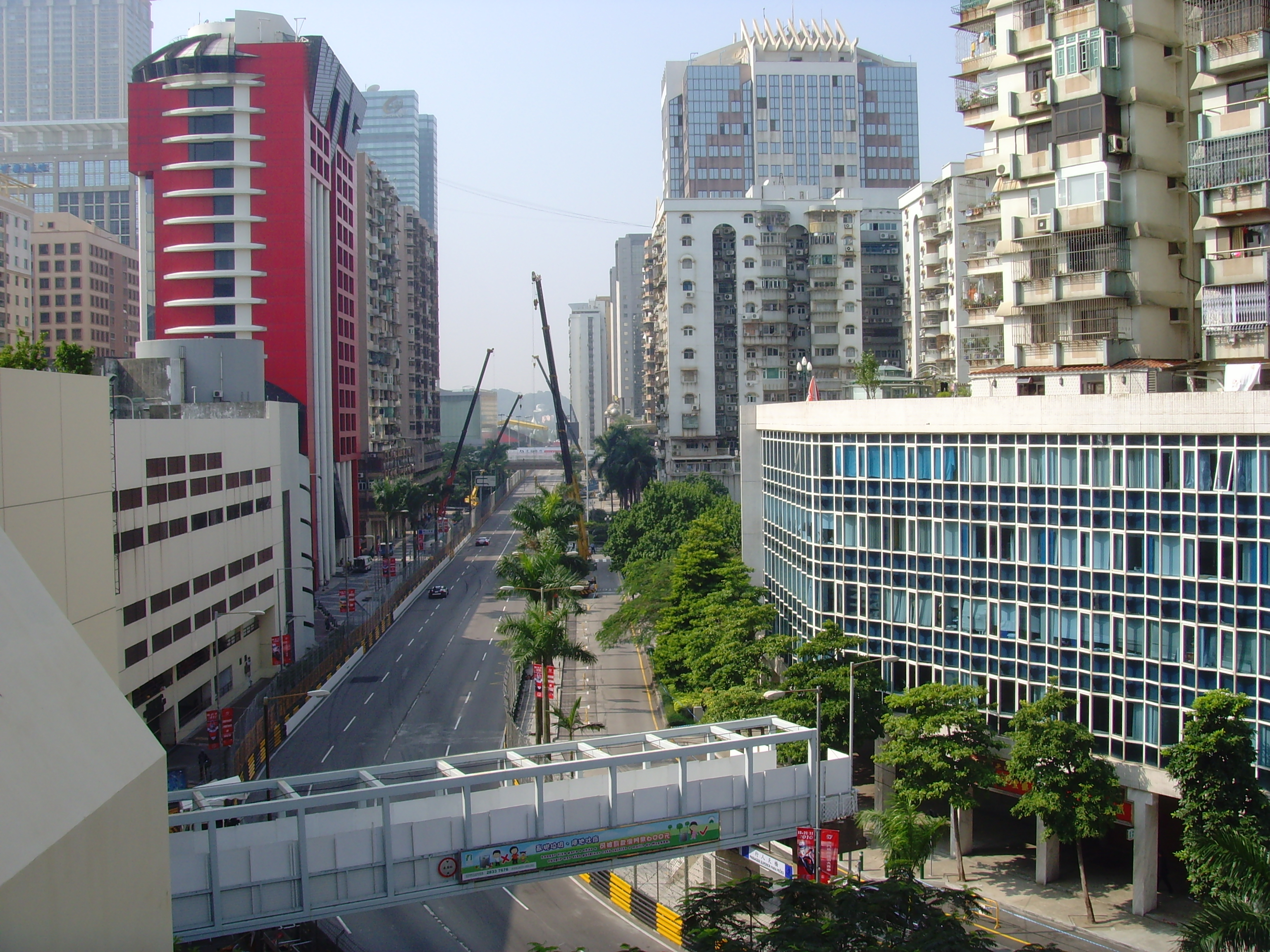
The Guia Circuit, where the race will be held.

The Macau Grand Prix is a race considered by drivers as a stepping stone to higher motor racing categories such as Formula One, and is Macau's most prestigious international sporting event. Held as a Formula Three race ever since 1983 - apart from three editions disrupted by the COVID-19 pandemic between 2020 and 2022, where the Grand Prix was held as a domestic Formula 4 event - the event switched to Formula Regional machinery from 2024 onwards.

The organizing bodies called this change a "natural consequence of the evolution of the junior single-seater landscape over the last couple of years", with Formula Regional now effectively embodying the multi-region multi-spec nature that F3 had previously been synonymous with.

The 2024 and 2025 editions saw all competitors use identical Tatuus T-318 chassis with a 1.742 L (106 cu in) turbocharged inline-4 engine developed by Autotecnica and Alfa Romeo. The introduction of the Formula Regional Gen2 ruleset in 2026 meant that the Macau Grand Prix also employed these regulations in 2026, with drivers competing in Tatuus T-326 cars.

=== Entry list ===
All competitors used an identical Tatuus T-326 chassis using a Toyota-based Autotecnica Motori ATM163T turbocharged three-cylinder engine and Pirelli tyres. The 13 participating teams were announced on 14 July.

Team	No.	Driver
(Republic of Ireland) KCMG by Pinnacle Motorsport	1	(France) Enzo Deligny
(Republic of Ireland) KCMG by Pinnacle Motorsport	2	(Japan) Hiyu Yamakoshi
(France) R-ace GP	3	(United Arab Emirates) Rashid Al Dhaheri
(France) R-ace GP	5	(Italy) Emanuele Olivieri
(France) ART Grand Prix	6	(France) Evan Giltaire
(France) ART Grand Prix	7	(Japan) Taito Kato
(Italy) Trident	8	(Poland) Tymek Kucharczyk
(Italy) Trident	9	(India) Ary Bansal
(Japan) TOM'S Racing	10	(Japan) Yuki Sano
(Japan) TOM'S Racing	11	(Japan) Kiyoshi Umegaki
(Netherlands) Van Amersfoort Racing	12	(Mexico) Ernesto Rivera
(Netherlands) Van Amersfoort Racing	15	(France) Jules Roussel
(Italy) Prema Racing	16	(United States) Alex Powell
(Italy) Prema Racing	18	(Colombia) Salim Hanna
(Netherlands) MP Motorsport	19	(Argentina) Mattia Colnaghi
(Netherlands) MP Motorsport	20	(United States) Sebastian Wheldon
(New Zealand) Rodin Motorsport	21	(Australia) Alex Ninovic
(New Zealand) Rodin Motorsport	22	(United Kingdom) Reza Seewooruthun
(Italy) RPM	23	(Italy) Maksimilian Popov
(Italy) RPM	25	(Singapore) Kabir Anurag
(Italy) CL Motorsport	26	(Italy) Zhenrui Chi
(Italy) CL Motorsport	27	(Italy) Matteo De Palo
(Switzerland) G4 Racing	28	(France) Andrea Dupé
(Switzerland) G4 Racing	29	(United Kingdom) Kai Daryanani
(Macau) SJM Theodore Racing	30	(United Kingdom) Kean Nakamura-Berta
(Macau) SJM Theodore Racing	31	(United States) James Egozi

== Practice and qualifying ==
The event featured two 40-minute practice sessions: the first on Thursday morning before the initial qualifying session, and the second on Friday before the second qualifying round. The qualification process itself was divided into two 40-minute sessions, with each driver's best time from either session determining their starting position for the qualification race.

The first practice session was held on Thursday morning in dry conditions. Mattia Colnaghi posted the fastest time for MP Motorsport with a 2:14.880s lap, 0.176 seconds ahead of TOM'S Racing's Yuki Sano. VAR's Jules Roussel came third, and ART's Taito Kato and Theodore Racing's Kean Nakamura-Berta completed the top five. The second ART of Evan Giltaire went sixth fastest leading RPM's Maksimilian Popov and Rodin's Reza Seewooruthun, before the second MP of Sebastian Wheldon and the R-ace GP of Emanuele Olivieri made up the final two top ten spots. The session ran largely without interruptions, bar a few yellow flags for drivers running into escape routes. Theodore Racing's James Egozi hit the wall at Fisherman's Bend right at the end of the session, while VAR's Ernesto Rivera also sustained damage in an incident but was able to continue.

The first qualifying session, held on Thursday afternoon, took place in dry, overcast conditions. Yamakoshi was the first to put a lap on the board with a 2:22.974s effort, with KCMG/Pinnacle's Enzo Deligny and Oliveri slotting in behind, before times started to fall on the second round of hotlaps. FP1 pacesetter Colnaghi was fastest on his second lap, beating Yamakoshi's effort by over seven seconds, with Rodin's Alex Ninovic second and Olivieri third. Wheldon closed in to 0.111s behind Colnaghi on his third lap, demoting Ninovic to third. Hotlap four brought provisional pole position for Rashid Al Dhaheri's R-ace GP with a 2:14.843s lap, before Colnaghi beat him by one tenth and Ninovic then rose to the top by a further 0.046s. Further laps were then halted by a red flag caused by CL Motorsport's Zhenrui Chi hitting the wall exiting Lisboa. Two more red flags then followed in quick succession before anyone could improve, the first caused by Kato crashing on the approach to Maternity Bend and the second caused by heavy contact for Wheldon that split his car into two. By the third restart, 14 minutes were left in the session. Al Dhaheri climbed up to second after the restart, before Rivera claimed provisional pole position with a 2:14.480s lap, hit the wall on his next lap and caused another stoppage before anyone could respond. Yamakoshi spun entering Lisboa to cause the fifth red flag of the session, and with less than four minutes left, the session was not resumed. Rivera's incident meant he lost his fastest lap, handing provisional pole position to Ninovic. Al Dhaheri took second, leading Colnaghi, Deligny and Nakamura-Berta. Trident's Tymek Kucharczyk was sixth ahead of Sano, Prema's Alex Powell, Olivieri and Roussel.

The second practice session was held on Friday morning in wet conditions. Only 14 of the 26 drivers posted representative laptimes, and Seewooruthun was fastest with a 02:49.379s lap, over 30 seconds slower than the top time in FP1. Olivieri came second, ahead of Yamakoshi and Egozi, with Al Dhaheri, Deligny, and Kato following behind. Popov, Sano and Giltaire completed the top ten. One red flag interrupted the session after a crash at Fishermen's Bend for Prema's Salim Hanna.

The second qualifying session was delayed by over 45 minutes due to incidents in other sessions and was held in wet conditions. Due to these conditions, times set were much slower than in the first qualifying session: after the first round of hotlaps, the top time stood at 2:43.846s, set by CL Motorsport's Matteo De Palo ahead of Egozi and Powell. Trident's Ary Bansal and G4 Racing's Kai Daryanani improved to second and third on their second laps, before Kucharczyk and De Palo set new benchmarks inside the 2:38-minute range. Times continued to improve as the track dried out as Nakamura-Berta set a 2:37.361s lap with 22 minutes to go. Bansal was the first to break the 2:36-minute barrier two minutes later before Deligny posted a 2:35.079s effort with 15 minutes left. De Palo responded with an improvement by six tenths. That proved to be the fastest time of the session, so De Palo led Olivieri and Deligny in the final classification. Yamakoshi and Kato followed, ahead of Giltaire, Al Dhaheri and Popov, before Bansal and Nakamura-Berta completed the top ten. No driver improved on their fastest Q1 time, so the results of that session formed the grid for the qualifying race.

=== Qualifying classification ===
Each of the driver's fastest lap times from the two qualifying sessions are denoted in bold.

Final qualifying classification
Pos	No.	Driver	Team	Q1 Time	Rank	Q2 Time	Rank	Gap	Grid
1	21	(Australia) Alex Ninovic	Rodin Motorsport	02:14.665	1	02:46.176	24	—	1
2	3	(United Arab Emirates) Rashid Al Dhaheri	R-ace GP	02:14.674	2	02:35.651	7	+0.009	2
3	19	(Argentina) Mattia Colnaghi	MP Motorsport	02:14.711	3	02:39.012	18	+0.046	3
4	1	(France) Enzo Deligny	KCMG by Pinnacle Motorsport	02:14.859	4	02:34.660	3	+0.194	4
5	30	(United Kingdom) Kean Nakamura-Berta	SJM Theodore Racing	02:14.937	5	02:37.021	10	+0.272	5
6	8	(Poland) Tymek Kucharczyk	Trident	02:14.941	6	02:38.031	14	+0.276	6
7	10	(Japan) Yuki Sano	TOM'S Racing	02:15.038	7	02:38.187	15	+0.373	7
8	16	(United States) Alex Powell	Prema Racing	02:15.076	8	02:37.410	12	+0.411	8
9	5	(Italy) Emanuele Olivieri	R-ace GP	02:15.107	9	02:34.429	2	+0.442	9
10	15	(France) Jules Roussel	Van Amersfoort Racing	02:15.341	10	02:37.441	13	+0.676	10
11	22	(United Kingdom) Reza Seewooruthun	Rodin Motorsport	02:15.344	11	02:54.080	26	+0.679	11
12	31	(United States) James Egozi	SJM Theodore Racing	02:15.390	12	02:40.647	20	+0.725	12
13	27	(Italy) Matteo De Palo	CL Motorsport	02:15.595	13	02:34.427	1	+0.930	13
14	18	(Colombia) Salim Hanna	Prema Racing	02:15.639	14	02:50.088	25	+0.974	14
15	11	(Japan) Kiyoshi Umegaki	TOM'S Racing	02:15.661	15	02:38.724	17	+0.996	20^{1}
16	12	(Mexico) Ernesto Rivera	Van Amersfoort Racing	02:15.687	16	02:42.297	21	+1.022	15
17	23	(Italy) Maksimilian Popov	RPM	02:15.717	17	02:36.138	8	+1.052	16
18	6	(France) Evan Giltaire	ART Grand Prix	02:15.949	18	02:35.284	6	+1.284	17
19	9	(India) Ary Bansal	Trident	02:16.042	19	02:36.301	9	+1.377	18
20	25	(Singapore) Kabir Anurag	RPM	02:16.127	20	02:38.546	16	+1.462	19
21	20	(United States) Sebastian Wheldon	MP Motorsport	02:16.707	21	02:43.023	22	+2.041	21
22	7	(Japan) Taito Kato	ART Grand Prix	02:16.950	22	02:35.077	5	+2.285	22
23	28	(France) Andrea Dupé	G4 Racing	02:17.686	23	02:39.202	19	+3.021	23
24	26	(Italy) Zhenrui Chi	CL Motorsport	02:17.976	24	02:43.568	23	+3.311	24
25	2	(Japan) Hiyu Yamakoshi	KCMG by Pinnacle Motorsport	02:18.248	25	02:34.909	4	+3.627	25
26	29	(United Kingdom) Kai Daryanani	G4 Racing	02:18.842	26	02:37.170	11	+4.177	26
Sources:

- **^1** – Kiyoshi Umegaki was handed a five-place grid penalty for failing to slow under yellow flags in the first qualifying session.

== Qualifying race ==
2026 Macau Grand Prix
- Qualifying Race

Race details
- Date: 21 November 2026
- Distance: 10 laps, 61.20 km (38.03 mi)
- Weather: Dry and cloudy

Pole position
Driver	(Australia) Alex Ninovic	Rodin Motorsport
- Time: 2:14.665

Fastest lap
Driver	(Argentina) Mattia Colnaghi	MP Motorsport
- Time: 2:14.652 on lap 9

Podium
First	(United Arab Emirates) Rashid Al Dhaheri	R-ace GP
Second	(Argentina) Mattia Colnaghi	MP Motorsport
Third	(Australia) Alex Ninovic	Rodin Motorsport

The 10-lap qualifying race to set the main race's starting order commenced at 16.15 Macau Standard Time (UTC+08:00) on 21 November. Conditions at the start were overcast, but dry, with the air temperature at 19 °C (66 °F). Al Dhaheri had the fastest start of the top three and instantly took over the lead, before Colnaghi also passed Ninovic exiting Lisboa. Al Dhaheri quickly built a gap over second place to lead by 1.1 seconds ending the opening lap. On the start of lap two, Giltaire collided with the RPM of Kabir Anurag, breaking the suspension of the latter car. Anurag stopped, but his car was cleared under yellow flags without the need for a bigger intervention. Bansal retired in the pitlane with a mechanical issue at the end of lap three.

By that point, the gap at the front had stabilized around the one-second mark as Al Dhaheri and Colnaghi traded laptimes, while Ninovic gradually dropped back from the top two. Wheldon was the next to retire, also doing so in the pitlane on lap six to keep the race without interruption. The order across the field remained static in the second half of the race, with no positional changes inside the top 15 spots.

Setting a new Formula Regional lap record around Guia Circuit on lap nine brought Colnaghi back to within half a second of the lead entering the final lap. Al Dhaheri defended well at Lisboa and had enough of a gap exiting the Melco hairpin to hold on to the lead and win the race by two tenths of a second. Ninovic in third ended the race 3.1 seconds behind the leader, ahead of Deligny as Kucharczyk took fifth place off Nakamura-Berta on the final lap. Sano came seventh, leading Powell and Olivieri, with Seewooruthun completing the top ten.

Final qualifying race classification
Pos	No.	Driver	Team	Laps	Time/Retired	Grid
1	3	(United Arab Emirates) Rashid Al Dhaheri	R-ace GP	10	22:47.669	2
2	19	(Argentina) Mattia Colnaghi	MP Motorsport	10	+0.251	3
3	21	(Australia) Alex Ninovic	Rodin Motorsport	10	+3.104	1
4	1	(France) Enzo Deligny	KCMG by Pinnacle Motorsport	10	+5.053	4
5	8	(Poland) Tymek Kucharczyk	Trident	10	+7.869	6
6	30	(United Kingdom) Kean Nakamura-Berta	SJM Theodore Racing	10	+8.508	5
7	10	(Japan) Yuki Sano	TOM'S Racing	10	+14.714	7
8	16	(United States) Alex Powell	Prema Racing	10	+15.892	8
9	5	(Italy) Emanuele Olivieri	R-ace GP	10	+16.693	9
10	22	(United Kingdom) Reza Seewooruthun	Rodin Motorsport	10	+17.406	11
11	15	(France) Jules Roussel	Van Amersfoort Racing	10	+17.820	10
12	31	(United States) James Egozi	SJM Theodore Racing	10	+18.793	12
13	27	(Italy) Matteo De Palo	CL Motorsport	10	+19.517	13
14	18	(Colombia) Salim Hanna	Prema Racing	10	+19.911	14
15	12	(Mexico) Ernesto Rivera	Van Amersfoort Racing	10	+20.617	15
16	7	(Japan) Taito Kato	ART Grand Prix	10	+22.092	22
17	23	(Italy) Maksimilian Popov	RPM	10	+22.205	16
18	6	(France) Evan Giltaire	ART Grand Prix	10	+22.323	17
19	11	(Japan) Kiyoshi Umegaki	TOM'S Racing	10	+26.335	20
20	26	(Italy) Zhenrui Chi	CL Motorsport	10	+31.776	24
21	2	(Japan) Hiyu Yamakoshi	KCMG by Pinnacle Motorsport	10	+32.490	25
22	29	(United Kingdom) Kai Daryanani	G4 Racing	10	+40.587	26
23	28	(France) Andrea Dupé	G4 Racing	10	+41.037	23
Ret	20	(United States) Sebastian Wheldon	MP Motorsport	6	Mechanical	21
Ret	9	(India) Ary Bansal	Trident	3	Mechanical	18
Ret	25	(Singapore) Kabir Anurag	RPM	2	Accident	19
Fastest Lap: Mattia Colnaghi, 2:14.652, 101.7 mph (163.6 km/h), on lap 9

== Main race ==
The 15-lap main race began at 15:30 local time (UTC+08:00) on 22 November under cloudy and dry conditions, with an air temperature of 22 °C (71 °F). Colnaghi had a slow getaway from his front-row spot, handing polesitter Al Dhaheri an instant advantage. Still, the cars behind were able to draft up to him, and Deligny took the lead entering Lisboa after starting fourth, with Nakamura-Berta and Sano rising from sixth and seventh to P2 and P3 as Al Dhaheri fell to fourth. A collision at the Melco hairpin on the same lap then saw front-wing damage for G4 Racing's Andrea Dupé, and he took to the pitlane. Lap three began with Roussel tagging Seewooruthun into a spin as the pair fought over ninth place on the main straight, and he hit the wall and caused a safety car interruption.

Deligny led the restart with ten laps to go, and he was able to send Nakamura-Berta to the outside line entering Lisboa to hold on to his lead. Oliveri then spun at the same corner as the rest of the field came through; he was initially able to continue before entering the pitlane with damage. Wheldon also sustained damage to his rear wing in a separate incident and retired in the pitlane, with Umegaki also taking a pitstop for repairs, but he continued one lap down on the field. One lap later, Hanna hit the wall exiting Lisboa, but his car was recovered without interruption. By that point, Nakamura-Berta had closed back up to leader Deligny. He drew alongside him on lap ten and forced Deligny into a mistake as the Frenchman crashed into the outside wall at Lisboa.

Deligny's car was recovered without a safety car intervention, handing Nakamura-Berta a 3.4-second gap to the field as Sano and Al Dhaheri fought over second place. Yamakoshi retired with a mechanical issue, before Al Dhaheri was finally able to complete the move past Sano on lap twelve. Ninovic followed through past Sano one lap later, while Nakamura-Berta grew his advantage to 3.9 seconds. On the final lap, Ninovic passed Al Dhaheri for second place, before Sano, who had fallen further down the order, defended heavily from Kato into Lisboa. The pair collided, both hit the barriers and De Palo caught one of the two stationary cars. Nakamura-Berta meanwhile took the chequered flag to win the Macau Grand Prix, with Ninovic and Al Dhaheri completing the podium. Egozi took fourth ahead of Powell, with Rivera, Popov and Roussel following behind. Kucharczyk took ninth, while Giltaire completed the top ten. Colnaghi took the fastest lap amid his recovery drive from the rear of the field to eleventh at the flag.

Race classification
Pos	No.	Driver	Team	Laps	Time/Retired	Grid
1	30	(United Kingdom) Kean Nakamura-Berta	SJM Theodore Racing	15	36:57.245	6
2	21	(Australia) Alex Ninovic	Rodin Motorsport	15	+2.426	3
3	3	(United Arab Emirates) Rashid Al Dhaheri	R-ace GP	15	+3.119	1
4	31	(United States) James Egozi	SJM Theodore Racing	15	+5.596	12
5	16	(United States) Alex Powell	Prema Racing	15	+7.673	8
6	12	(Mexico) Ernesto Rivera	Van Amersfoort Racing	15	+8.548	15
7	23	(Italy) Maksimilian Popov	RPM	15	+14.306	17
8	15	(France) Jules Roussel	Van Amersfoort Racing	15	+15.157	11
9	8	(Poland) Tymek Kucharczyk	Trident	15	+15.302	5
10	6	(France) Evan Giltaire	ART Grand Prix	15	+16.188	18
11	19	(Argentina) Mattia Colnaghi	MP Motorsport	15	+16.188	2
12	26	(Italy) Zhenrui Chi	CL Motorsport	15	+30.892	20
13	29	(United Kingdom) Kai Daryanani	G4 Racing	15	+31.568	22
14	9	(India) Ary Bansal	Trident	15	+32.049	25
15	25	(Singapore) Kabir Anurag	RPM	15	+32.414	26
16	28	(France) Andrea Dupé	G4 Racing	15	+33.200	23
17†	10	(Japan) Yuki Sano	TOM'S Racing	14	Accident	7
18†	7	(Japan) Taito Kato	ART Grand Prix	14	Accident	16
19†	27	(Italy) Matteo De Palo	CL Motorsport	14	Accident	13
20	11	(Japan) Kiyoshi Umegaki	TOM'S Racing	14	+1 lap	19
Ret	1	(France) Enzo Deligny	KCMG by Pinnacle Motorsport	9	Accident	4
Ret	2	(Japan) Hiyu Yamakoshi	KCMG by Pinnacle Motorsport	9	Mechanical	21
Ret	20	(United States) Sebastian Wheldon	MP Motorsport	7	Accident	24
Ret	18	(Colombia) Salim Hanna	Prema Racing	6	Accident	14
Ret	5	(Italy) Emanuele Olivieri	R-ace GP	6	Accident	9
Ret	22	(United Kingdom) Reza Seewooruthun	Rodin Motorsport	2	Accident	10
Fastest Lap: Mattia Colnaghi, 2:15.143, 101.3 mph (163.0 km/h), on lap 12

== See also ==
- 2026 FIA GT World Cup
- 2026 Macau Guia Race
- 2026 FIA F4 World Cup
