= Prenois =

- Commune
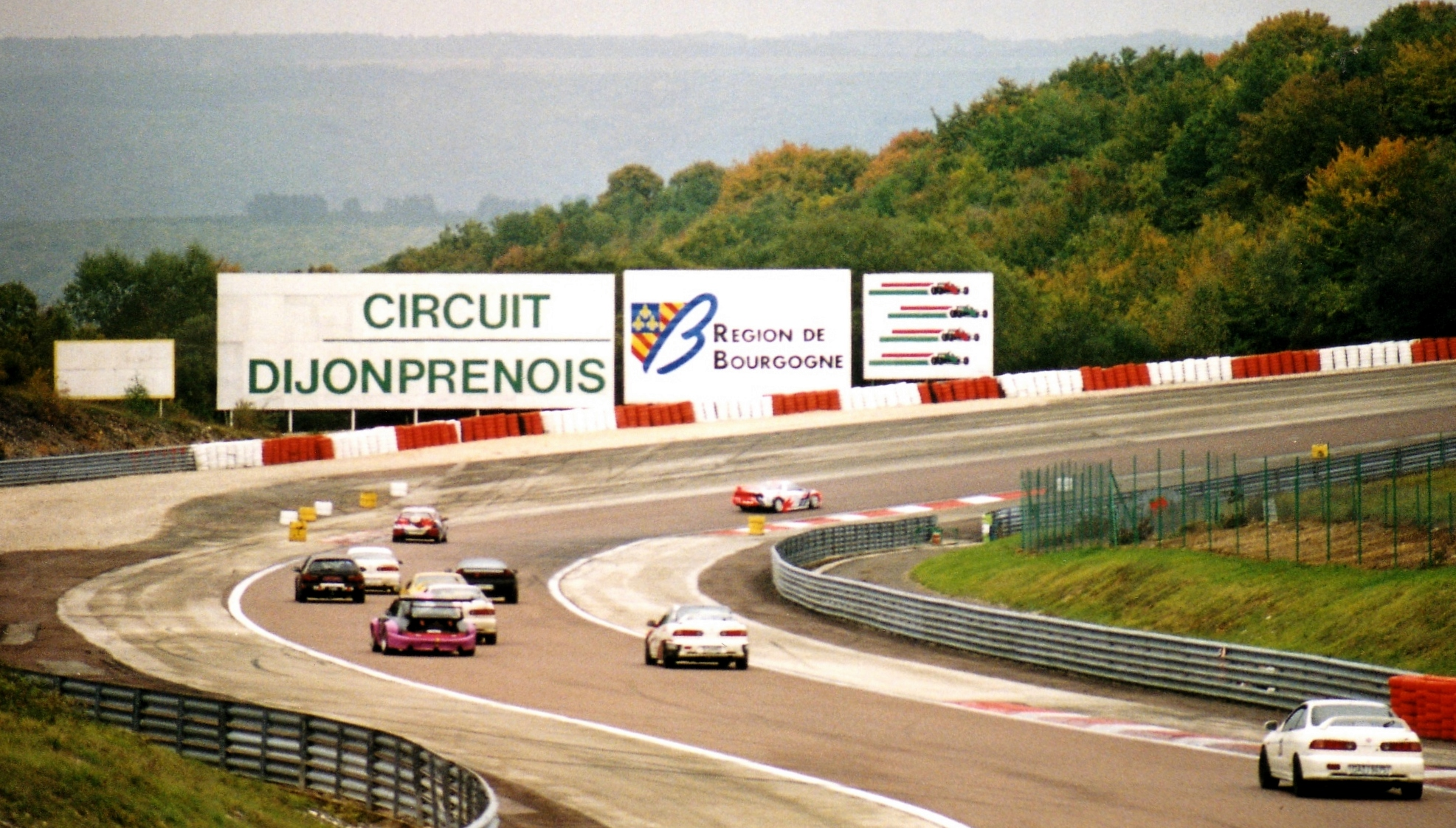
- Dijon-Prenois racetrack

- Coat of arms
- Location of Prenois
- Location within France Location within Bourgogne-Franche-Comté
- Coordinates: 47°22′35″N 4°53′54″E
- Country: France
- Region: Bourgogne-Franche-Comté
- Department: Côte-d'Or
- Arrondissement: Dijon
- Canton: Fontaine-lès-Dijon
- Intercommunality: Forêts, Seine et Suzon

Government
  - Mayor (2020–2026): Nathalie Bard
- Area^{1}: 19.16 km^{2} (7.40 sq mi)
- Highest elevation: 541 m (1,775 ft)
- Lowest elevation: 300 m (980 ft)
- Population (2023): 460
  - Density: 24/km^{2} (62/sq mi)
- Time zone: UTC+01:00 (CET)
  - Summer (DST): UTC+02:00 (CEST)
- INSEE/Postal code: 21508 /21370
- ^{1} French Land Register data, which excludes lakes, ponds, glaciers > 1 km^{2} (0.386 sq mi or 247 acres) and river estuaries.

Prenois (French pronunciation: [pʁənwa]) is a commune in the Côte-d'Or department in eastern France. It is best known for the Dijon-Prenois racetrack.

== Population ==
Historical population
| Year | Pop. | ±% p.a. |
|---|---|---|
| 1968 | 176 | — |
| 1975 | 166 | −0.83% |
| 1982 | 208 | +3.27% |
| 1990 | 299 | +4.64% |
| 1999 | 310 | +0.40% |
| 2007 | 388 | +2.85% |
| 2012 | 399 | +0.56% |
| 2017 | 419 | +0.98% |
| 2023 | 460 | +1.57% |
Source: INSEE

== See also ==
- Communes of the Côte-d'Or department
