= Mygale M21-F4 =

French race car

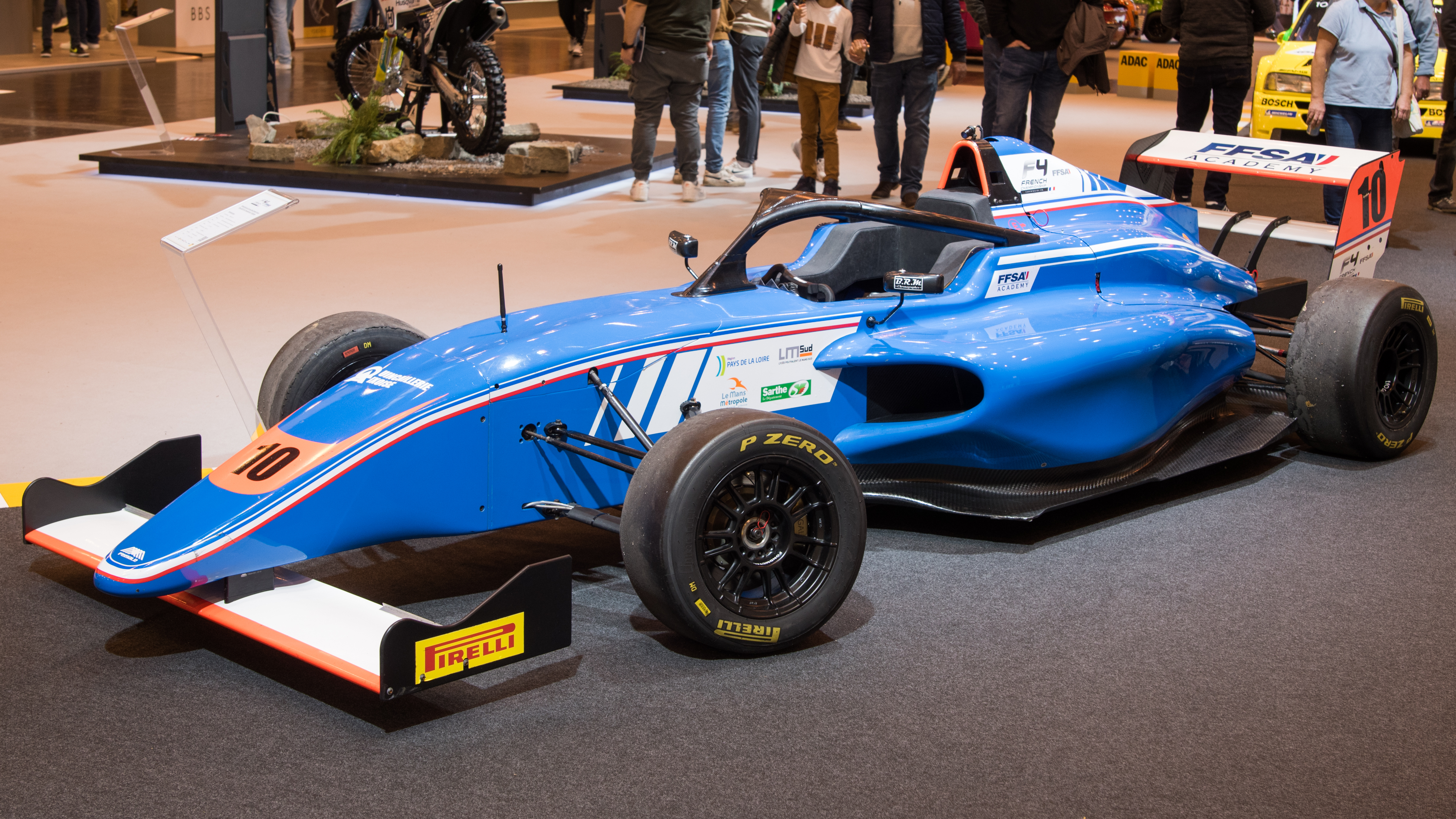
- Constructor: Mygale
- Predecessor: Mygale M14-F4

Technical specifications
- Chassis: Carbon-fiber monocoque
- Suspension (front): Push-rod with twin non-adjustable shock absorbers, adjustable anti-roll bar and third element
- Suspension (rear): Push-rod with twin non-adjustable shock absorbers, adjustable anti-roll bar and third element
- Length: 4,341–4,879 mm (171–192 in)
- Width: 1,733–1,738 mm (68–68 in) including tyres
- Height: 958–1,044 mm (38–41 in)
- Axle track: 1,493.5 mm (59 in) (front); 1,430.4 mm (56 in) (rear)
- Wheelbase: 2,742 mm (108 in)
- Engine: Renault Sport 1.3 L (79 cu in) DOHC inline-4 turbocharged, longitudinally mounted in a mid-engined, rear-wheel drive layout
- Transmission: SADEV SLR75-14 6-speed + 1-reverse semi-automatic sequential gearbox
- Power: 160–180 hp (119–134 kW)
- Weight: 570 kg (1,257 lb) including driver
- Fuel: Various unleaded control fuel
- Lubricants: Various
- Brakes: 4-piston calipers Ventilated aluminum brake discs
- Tyres: Various

Competition history
- Debut: 2021

The Mygale M21-F4 is an open-wheel formula race car, designed, developed and built by French manufacturer Mygale, for Formula 4 junior categories, since 2021.

== Championships ==
- French F4 Championship (2022–present)
- F4 Indian Championship (2023–present)
- F4 Chinese Championship (2024–present)
- FIA F4 World Cup (2025)
