= Circuit de Lédenon =

French racing circuit

- Full Circuit (1973–present)
- Location: Lédenon, Gard
- Coordinates: 43°55′25″N 4°30′21″E
- Capacity: 5,000 (Grandstands)
- FIA Grade: 2 (Note: Circuit de Lédenon's Grade 2 licence expired 9 November 2025.)
- Broke ground: 1970
- Opened: 16 June 1973; 53 years ago
- Major events: Current: French F4 (2011–2013, 2015–2016, 2019, 2021–present); Former: Racecar Euro Series (2009–2010); FFSA GT (1999–2015, 2019, 2021–2024); TC France Series (2021–2025); Porsche Carrera Cup France (1992–1994, 1996–2002, 2005–2010, 2012–2015); French Formula Renault (1977–1979, 1986–2007); Italian GT (2002); French F3 (1982–2002); French Supertouring Championship (1977–1980, 1982–1991, 1994, 1996–2005)
- Website: http://www.ledenon.com/index.html

Full Circuit (1973–present)
- Length: 3.151 km (1.958 mi)
- Turns: 13
- Race lap record: 1:17.762 ( (France) Soheil Ayari, Saleen S7-R, 2007, GT1)

Circuit de Lédenon is a 3.151 km (1.958 mi) motor racing circuit located next to the town of Lédenon, Gard, France, about 25 km (16 mi) northeast of Nîmes. It hosts mostly National championships, such as FFSA GT Championship and French F4 Championship.

== History ==
In 1970, two motor sport enthusiasts, Jean-Claude and Sylvie Bondurand, decided to build a circuit in the town of Lédenon. The circuit was approved for use on June 16, 1973. The first notable races at the circuit were not held until 1977, when Super Touring and Formula Renault events were held. The track has been in use continuously since then, hosting a variety of series, from touring cars and French GT to the French F4 Championship.

The circuit is set in a natural bowl giving it a high amount of altitude change and making it the most undulating track in France. This, coupled with its winding layout, makes it a difficult circuit to drive. It is also the only major race track in France to run in an anti-clockwise direction.

== Lap records ==
As of May 2026, the fastest official race lap records at the Circuit de Lédenon are listed as:

| Category | Time | Driver | Vehicle | Event |
Full Circuit (1973–present): 3.151 km (1.958 mi)
| GT1 (GTS) | 1:17.762 | Soheil Ayari | Saleen S7-R | 2007 Lédenon FFSA GT round |
| Formula Renault 2.0 | 1:19.064 | Jules Bianchi | Tatuus FR2000 | 2007 Lédenon French Formula Renault round |
| GT3 | 1:19.159 | Anthony Beltoise | Audi R8 LMS Ultra | 2014 Lédenon FFSA GT round |
| Formula 3 | 1:19.592 | Bruno Besson | Dallara F399 | 2001 Lédenon French F3 round |
| Formula 4 | 1:19.829 | Chester Kieffer | Mygale M21-F4 | 2024 Lédenon French F4 round |
| Superbike | 1:21.574 | Grégory Leblanc | BMW M1000RR | 2026 Lédenon French Superbike round |
| Porsche Carrera Cup | 1:22.136 | Steven Palette | Porsche 911 (991 I) GT3 Cup | 2015 Lédenon Porsche Carrera Cup France round |
| Supersport | 1:23.023 | Mathieu Gines | Yamaha YZF-R6 | 2026 Lédenon French Supersport round |
| GT2 | 1:23.084 | Richard Balandras | Porsche 911 (997) GT3 RSR | 2007 Lédenon FFSA GT round |
| Formula Renault 1.6 | 1:23.485 | Anthoine Hubert | Signatech FR 1.6 | 2013 Lédenon French F4 round |
| N-GT | 1:24.762 | Thierry Rabineau | Ferrari 360 Modena N-GT | 2004 Lédenon FFSA GT round |
| Silhouette racing car | 1:25.684 | Vincent Radermecker | SEAT Toledo Silhouette | 2002 Lédenon French Supertouring round |
| GT4 | 1:25.781 | Mateo Villagómez | Aston Martin Vantage AMR GT4 | 2023 Lédenon French GT4 round |
| TCR Touring Car | 1:26.692 | Julien Paget | Cupra León Competición TCR | 2024 Lédenon TC France round |
| Group 6 | 1:27.050 | Dominique Lacaud | TOJ SC206 | 1984 Lédenon French Group 6 race |
| Super Touring | 1:31.093 | William David | Peugeot 406 | 2000 Lédenon French Supertouring round |
| Supersport 300 | 1:32.120 | Enzo Dahmani | Yamaha YZF-R3 | 2022 Lédenon French Supersport 300 round |
| Renault Clio Cup | 1:35.791 | Nicolas Milan | Renault Clio R.S. IV | 2019 Lédenon Renault Clio Cup France round |
| Group A | 1:38.340 | Fabien Giroix | BMW M3 (E30) | 1987 Lédenon French Supertouring Group A round |
