= FFSA Academy =

French racing team training association

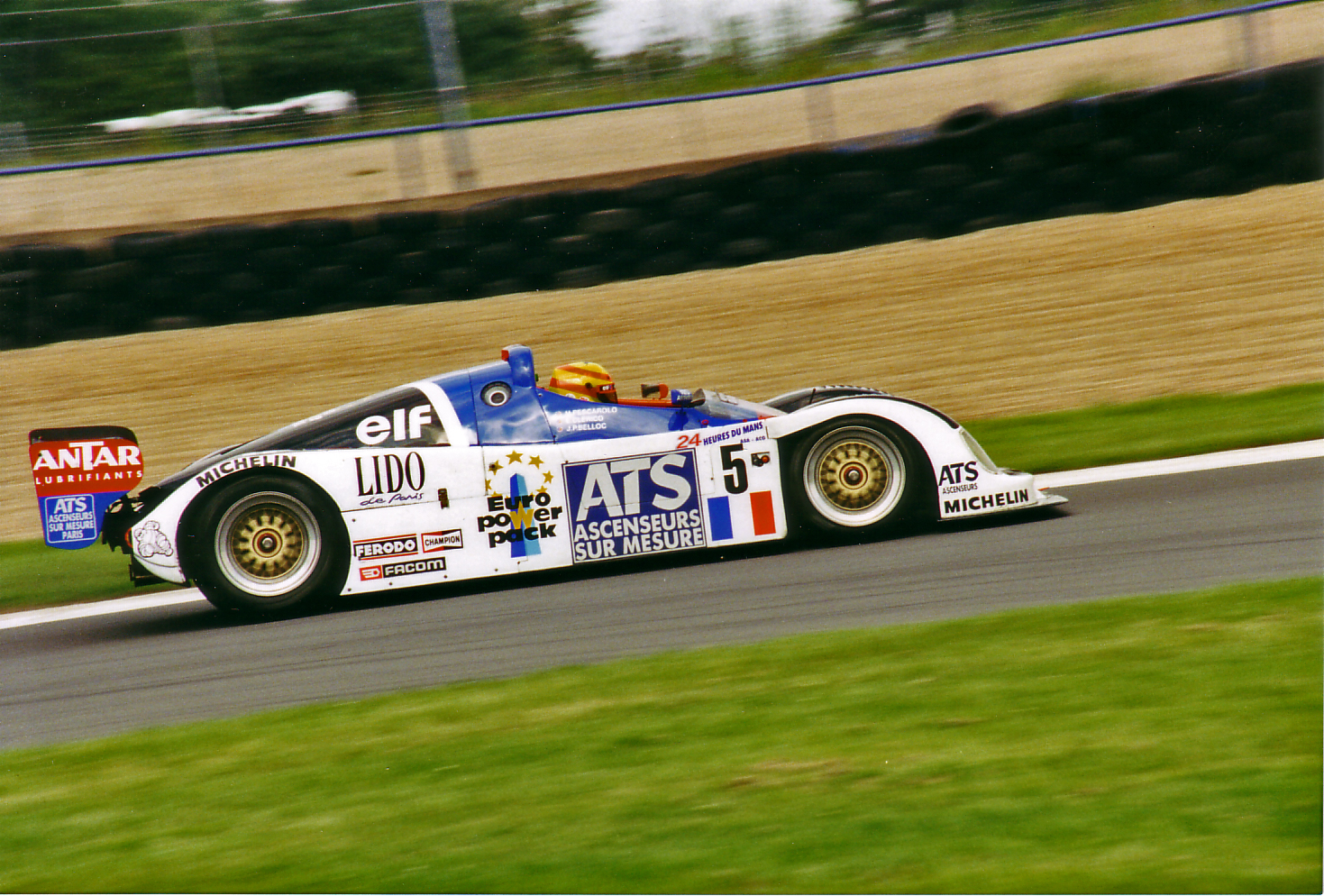
A Courage-Porsche Le Mans Prototype campaigned by La Filière in 1997, with Henri Pescarolo

The FFSA Academy (formerly known as La Filière, Volant Elf and Auto Sport Academy) was created in 1993 by Elf Aquitaine to promote French drivers at the highest level, in line with its marketing approach and its commitment to Renault in F1. It is located at: Technoparc des 24 Heures, Chemin aux Boeufs, 72100 Le Mans, France.

== History ==
A variety of driving schools and motorsport talent searches operated across France throughout the 1970s and 1980s, and were all eventually merged to create the Auto Sport Academy in 1993. It was taken over in April 2001 by the FFSA (Fédération Française du Sport Automobile), becoming one of its subsidiaries.

Its main objective is to train young drivers and promote the best to give them access to a professional career; 40 to 50 drivers are trained every year in its two main disciplines, competition karting (Formula Kart) and single-seater racing (Formula Campus Renault Elf).

In effect, until its creation, budding drivers thought that they had to systematically choose between studies and motorsport. The Academy puts the situation in another light: in view of the few successful candidates in motorsport, it offers potential drivers the option of testing their sporting talents while continuing their studies.

It also provides free training for would be mechanics, in partnership with the State Education system. 87% of trainee mechanics work in the world of competition on completion of their training.

It was renamed Auto Sport Academy in 2007, and then FFSA Academy in 2016.

== Current drivers ==
=== French F4 Championship ===
The Academy currently governs the French F4 Championship and supports their drivers. They are:

Driver
(United States) Truly Adams
(United States) Kyler Cheezum
(Austria) Clara Stiebleichinger
(France) Arthur Eschalier
(France) Jimmy Hélias
(Israel) Yuval Rosen
(France) Lilian Soares
(Cuba) Isabella Abreu
(France) Héloïse Goldberg
(Australia) Lewis Francis
(France) Lisa Billard
(United States) Maverick McKenna
(France) Guillaume Bouzar
(France) Nicolas Pasquier
(France) Angélina Proenca
(Morocco) Sofia Zanfari
(France) Tom Dussol
(Italy) Ginevra Panzeri
(France) Matthéo Dauvergne
(France) Paul Gleizes
(France) Oscar Goudchaux
(France) Jade Jacquet
(France) Hugo Herrouin
(Japan) Kota Tsuchihashi
(France) Thomas Senecloze
(France) Walter Schulz
(Kenya) Shane Chandaria
(Canada) Autumn Fisher
(Poland) Wojciech Woda
(Belgium) Thibaut Ramaekers
(Netherlands) Annabelle Brian
(France) Jules Avril
(United States) Jack Iliffe
(Paraguay) Sasha Beisemann

=== Other ===
The drivers currently supported by the FFSA are:

Driver	Years	Current series	Titles achieved as FFSA member
(France) Jules Caranta	2025–	Eurocup-3	None
(France) Evan Giltaire	2024–	Formula Regional Middle East Championship; Formula Regional European Championship	None
(France) Alessandro Giusti	2023–	FIA Formula 3 Championship	None
(France) Victor Martins	2016–	FIA Formula 2 Championship	Formula Renault Eurocup; FIA Formula 3 Championship
(France) Enzo Peugeot	2024–	Formula Regional European Championship	None
