= FIA Gold Categorisation =

Tier in the FIA Drivers' Categorisation

Gold Categorisation is a category within the FIA Driver Categorisation, a system created by Fédération Internationale de l'Automobile that lists drivers on the basis of their achievements and performances. This categorization is used in sports car racing championships such as FIA World Endurance Championship, IMSA SportsCar Championship, European Le Mans Series, etc. It was merged from the FIA WEC and FIA GT3 lists. The initial categorisation is based on the driver's age and their career record.

== Requirements for Gold Categorisation ==
Driver rankings are revised annually and issued in December.

Only the 2022 series names are listed in this summary; the historical equivalent series also count in most cases.

=== General definition ===
- Main professional activity based around driving in motor sport.
- Participation in high-level karting for three or more seasons.
- Participation in significant single-seater competitions for more than two seasons with at least one podium.
- The driver's motor sport career (karting or cars) began before the age of 20 with at least five full seasons of results.

=== Career ===
- Top 5 finisher in the general classification of a Tier 2 Series (Porsche Supercup, NASCAR Cup Series, FIA Formula 3 Championship, Formula Renault V6 Eurocup, Indy NXT, an international Formula 4 series, any FIA World Cup [with the exception of the FIA Nations Cup and the FIA Motorsport Games], DTM, Super Formula Championship, and Super GT).
- Winner of a Tier 3 Series (overall or category in multi-class racing). Tier 3 championships include Regional and National Touring Car Championships, Regional or National Porsche Carrera Cup, Regional or National LMP3 series, Regional or National GT4 Series, NASCAR O'Reilly Auto Parts Series, NASCAR Truck Series, FIA European Hill Climb Championship, International and European Karting Championships.
- Comparable level of performance to Gold drivers.
- Any additional criteria deemed worthy of consideration by the committee. The following career achievements of categorised drivers in monitored series would result in an upgrade to Gold.
- Finishing in the top three in the Silver Cup in a GT World Challenge series.
- Achieving relevant race results in LMP2, LMP3, LMGTE Am (including ELMS) and GT3 (in the Asian Le Mans Series and Le Mans Cup).

=== Age ===
- Drivers over 50 will be reduced by 1 grade for the season following their 50th birthday (starting in 2023, age downgrades will start after the age of 55).
- Drivers over 55 will be reduced by an additional grade for the season following their 55th birthday, thus no driver over 55 can be above Silver Categorisation.

=== Discretionary ===
Drivers whose performances and achievements, despite not being covered by one of the definitions above, may be considered as Gold by the FIA.

== Current drivers ==
As of November 2025, this is the list of drivers who hold a Gold license, as published by the FIA.

Name	Country	Current / most recent series	Ref.
Jonathan Aberdein	South Africa	2023 European Le Mans Series	
Vincent Abril	France	2026 International GT Open	
Daniel Abt	Germany	2019–20 Formula E Championship	
Riccardo Agostini	Italy	2025–26 Asian Le Mans Series / 2026 IMSA SportsCar Championship / 2026 European Le Mans Series / 2026 GT World Challenge America	
Enaam Ahmed	United Kingdom	2023 Indy NXT	
Joey Alders	Netherlands	2021 European Le Mans Series	
Giuliano Alesi	France	2026 Super GT Series / 2026 Nürburgring Langstrecken-Serie	
James Allen	Australia	2025–26 Asian Le Mans Series / 2026 European Le Mans Series	
Kai Allen	Australia	2026 Supercars Championship	
A. J. Allmendinger	United States	2026 NASCAR Cup Series	
Giacomo Altoè	Italy	2026 IMSA SportsCar Championship / 2026 Le Mans Cup	
Zoël Amberg	Switzerland	2015 GP2 Series	
Julien Andlauer	France	2026 IMSA SportsCar Championship	
Marco Andretti	United States	2024 ARCA Menards Series / 2024 NASCAR Craftsman Truck Series	
Scott Andrews	Australia	2026 IMSA SportsCar Championship	
Richard Antinucci	United States	2022 Lamborghini Super Trofeo North America	
Seiji Ara	Japan	2024 Super GT Series	
Marcus Armstrong	New Zealand	2026 IndyCar Series	
Ralf Aron	Estonia	2024–25 Asian Le Mans Series	
Sebastian Asch	Germany	2024 Nürburgring Langstrecken-Serie	
Lawson Aschenbach	United States	2020 IMSA SportsCar Championship	
Oliver Askew	United States	2021–22 Formula E World Championship	
Bill Auberlen	United States	2024 GT World Challenge America	
Gabriel Aubry	France	2024 European Le Mans Series	
Mikel Azcona	Spain	2024 TCR World Tour	
Fabio Babini	Italy	2024–25 Asian Le Mans Series	
Alessandro Balzan	Italy	2024 Le Mans Cup	
Rodrigo Baptista	Brazil	2024 GT4 America Series / 2024 TCR South America Touring Car Championship	
Vitor Baptista	Brazil	2024 Stock Car Pro Series	
João Barbosa	Portugal	2024 IMSA SportsCar Championship	
Ben Barker	United Kingdom	2023–24 Asian Le Mans Series / 2024 FIA World Endurance Championship	
Rubens Barrichello	Brazil	2024 Stock Car Pro Series	
Nico Bastian	Germany	2024 Nürburgring Langstrecken-Serie	
Zach Bates	Australia	2025 Super2 Series	
Dominik Baumann	Austria	2024 GT World Challenge Europe / 2024 International GT Open	
Mathias Beche	Switzerland	2024–25 Asian Le Mans Series	
David Beckmann	Germany	2024–25 Formula E World Championship	
Andrea Belicchi	Italy	2019–20 FIA World Endurance Championship	
Matt Bell	United Kingdom	2023 IMSA SportsCar Championship/2023 Le Mans Cup	
Townsend Bell	United States	2020 IMSA SportsCar Championship	
Mehdi Bennani	Morocco	2024 World Touring Car Cup	
Olivier Beretta	Monaco	2019–20 FIA World Endurance Championship	
Emil Bernstorff	United Kingdom	2016 GP2 Series	
Nathanaël Berthon	France	2024 Nürburgring Langstrecken-Serie	
Andrea Bertolini	Italy	2024 GT World Challenge Europe Endurance Cup	
Bruno Besson	France	2019 FFSA GT season	
Thomas Biagi	Italy	2024 Italian GT Championship	
Rene Binder	Austria	2024 European Le Mans Series / 2023–24 Asian Le Mans Series	
Jeroen Bleekemolen	Netherlands	2025 Middle East Trophy / 2024 Lamborghini Super Trofeo North America	
Dorian Boccolacci	France	2024 GT World Challenge Asia / 2024 GT World Challenge Europe Endurance Cup / 2023–24 Asian Le Mans Series	
Jonathan Bomarito	United States	2022 IMSA SportsCar Championship	
Marco Bonanomi	Italy	2021 International GT Open	
Ralph Boschung	Switzerland	2023 Formula 2 Championship	
Wayne Boyd	United Kingdom	2024 IMSA SportsCar Championship / 2024 Gulf 12 Hours	
Richard Bradley	United Kingdom	2024 European Le Mans Series	
Colin Braun	United States	2025 IMSA SportsCar Championship	
Will Brown	Australia	2025 Formula Regional Oceania Championship / 2025 Supercars Championship	
Luke Browning	United Kingdom	2025 Formula 2 Championship	
Alex Brundle	United Kingdom	2024 Porsche Endurance Trophy Nürburgring	
Alex Buncombe	United Kingdom	2024 British GT Championship	
Rory Butcher	United Kingdom	2024 Le Mans Cup	
Bastian Buus	Denmark	2023–24 Asian Le Mans Series / 2024 GT World Challenge Europe / 2024 GT World Challenge Asia / 2024 Intercontinental GT Challenge	
Olli Caldwell	United Kingdom	2024–25 Asian Le Mans Series / 2025 European Le Mans Series	
Thiago Camilo	Brazil	2024 Stock Car Pro Series	
Dan Cammish	United Kingdom	2024 British Touring Car Championship	
Sergio Campana	Italy	2024 Ultimate Cup Series	
Agustin Canapino	Argentina	2024 IndyCar Series / 2024 Turismo Carretera	
Adam Carroll	United Kingdom	2024 GT World Challenge America	
Michael Caruso	Australia	2024 Supercars Championship	
Kevin Ceccon	Italy	2023 TCR World Tour / 2023 TCR Europe Touring Car Series	
Paul-Loup Chatin	France	2025 IMSA SportsCar Championship / 2025 FIA World Endurance Championship	
Gabby Chaves	Colombia / United States	2024 IMSA SportsCar Championship	
Eddie Cheever III	Italy / United States	2024 GT World Challenge Europe sprint cup / 2024 International GT Open	
Katsumasa Chiyo	Japan	2024 Super GT Series	
Adam Christodoulou	United Kingdom	2025 International GT Open	
Austin Cindric	United States	2025 NASCAR Cup Series	
Marco Cioci	Italy	2020 Italian GT Championship	
Daniel Clos	Spain	2021 Alpine Elf Europa Cup	
Marcus Clutton	United Kingdom	2024 British GT Championship	
Jonny Cocker	United Kingdom	2019 British GT Championship	
Stefano Coletti	Monaco	2020 International GT Open	
Ricky Collard	United Kingdom	2024 British GT Championship	
Caio Collet	Brazil	2025 Indy NXT	
Lorenzo Colombo	Italy	2022 FIA World Endurance Championship / 2022 European Le Mans Series	
Tom Coronel	Netherlands	2024 Porsche Endurance Trophy Nürburgring	
Kei Cozzolino	Japan	2025 Super GT Series	
Matt Crafton	United States	2025 NASCAR Craftsman Truck Series	
Eric Curran	United States	2024 HSR Prototype Challenge	
Conor Daly	United States	2025 IndyCar Series	
Ryan Dalziel	United Kingdom	2025 IMSA SportsCar Championship / 2025 24H Series	
Jehan Daruvala	India	2023–24 Formula E World Championship	
James Davison	Australia	2022 S5000 Australian Drivers' Championship	
Will Davison	Australia	2025 Supercars Championship	
Roman De Angelis	Canada	2025 IMSA SportsCar Championship / 2025 FIA World Endurance Championship	
Reshad de Gerus	France	2025 European Le Mans Series	
Anton de Pasquale	Australia	2025 Supercars Championship	
Ulysse de Pauw	Belgium	2024 Intercontinental GT Challenge / 2024 European Le Mans Series / 2024 GT World Challenge Europe	
Connor De Phillippi	United States	2025 IMSA SportsCar Championship / 2025 GT World Challenge America	
Simona de Silvestro	Switzerland	2024 Porsche Carrera Cup Scandinavia	
Ugo de Wilde	Belgium	2025 GT World Challenge Europe	
Louis Delétraz	Switzerland	2024–25 Asian Le Mans Series/ 2025 European Le Mans Series / 2025 IMSA SportsCar Championship	
Ben Devlin	United Kingdom	2021 IMSA SportsCar Championship	
Marvin Dienst	Germany	2025 GT World Challenge Europe	
Tom Dillmann	France	2025 IMSA SportsCar Championship / 2024–25 Asian Le Mans Series / 2025 European Le Mans Series	
Austin Dillon	United States	2025 NASCAR Cup Series	
Thomas Drouet	France	2025 GT World Challenge Europe Endurance Cup	
David Droux	Switzerland	2025 Prototype Winter Series / 2025 Le Mans Cup	
Peter Dumbreck	United Kingdom	2020 Nürburgring Langstrecken-Series	
Paul Dumbrell	Australia	2018 Super2 Series	
Salvador Duran	France	2015-16 Formula E Championship	
Stef Dusseldorp	Netherlands	2021 Nürburgring Langstrecken Series	
Charlie Eastwood	Ireland	2025 FIA World Endurance Championship / 2025 European Le Mans Series / 2025 IMSA SportsCar Championship	
Yann Ehrlacher	France	2025 TCR World Tour	
Tio Ellinas	Cyprus	2021 Porsche Supercup	
Philip Ellis	United Kingdom	2025 IMSA SportsCar Championship / 2025 GT World Challenge America	
Tomáš Enge	Czech Republic	2019 24H GT Series	
Luca Engstler	Germany	2025 Deutsche Tourenwagen Masters / 2025 GT Winter Series / 2025 Nürburgring Langstrecken-Serie / 2025 GT World Challenge Europe	
Adam Eteki	France	2024 GT World Challenge Europe	
Jaxon Evans	New Zealand	2025 GT World Challenge Australia / 2025 Supercars Championship	
Simon Evans	New Zealand	2021–22 Toyota Finance 86 Championship	
Ryan Eversley	United States	2025 Michelin Pilot Challenge	
Charlie Fagg	United Kingdom	2025 Super GT Series	
Jody Fannin	United Kingdom	2021 European Le Mans Series	
Dominik Farnbacher	Germany	2019 IMSA SportsCar Championship	
Mario Farnbacher	Germany	2025 IMSA SportsCar Championship	
Fairuz Fauzy	Malaysia	2017 Blancpain GT Series Asia	
Broc Feeney	Australia	2025 Formula Regional Oceania Championship / 2025 Supercars Championship / 2025 GT World Challenge Australia	
Felipe Fernández Laser	Germany	2025 Nürburgring Langstrecken-Serie / 2025 Le Mans Cup / 2025 Intercontinental GT Challenge	
Lorenzo Ferrari	Italy	2025 Italian GT Championship	
Santino Ferrucci	United States	2025 IndyCar Series	
Sennan Fielding	United Kingdom	2024 Le Mans Cup	
Luca Filippi	Italy	2022 FIA ETCR – eTouring Car World Cup	
Dean Fiore	Australia	2025 Intercontinental GT Challenge	
Christian Fittipaldi	Brazil	2025 Porsche Carrera Cup Brazil	
Enzo Fittipaldi	Brazil	2025 European Le Mans Series	
Pietro Fittipaldi	Brazil	2025 European Le Mans Series / 2025 IMSA SportsCar Championship	
Lorenzo Fluxá	Spain	2025 European Le Mans Series	
Robby Foley	United States	2025 IMSA SportsCar Championship / 2025 Michelin Pilot Challenge / 2025 GT World Challenge America	
Alex Fontana	Switzerland	2024–25 Asian Le Mans Series	
Lucas Foresti	Brazil	2025 Stock Car Pro Series	
Nick Foster	Australia	2022 GT World Challenge Asia	
Tommy Foster	United Kingdom	2025 Intercontinental GT Challenge / 2025 GT World Challenge Europe	
Igor Fraga	Brazil	2025 Super Formula Championship / 2025 Super GT Series	
Felipe Fraga	Brazil	2025 IMSA SportsCar Championship / 2025 Stock Car Pro Series	
Marino Franchitti	United Kingdom	2017 IMSA SportsCar Championship	
Ernie Francis Jr	United States	2025 Lamborghini Super Trofeo North America	
Declan Fraser	Australia	2025 GT World Challenge Australia	
Kaylen Frederick	United States	2025 Super Formula Lights	
Tomonobu Fujii	Japan	2025 Super Taikyu Series / 2025 Super GT Series	
Nirei Fukuzumi	Japan	2025 Super Formula Championship / 2025 Super GT Series	
David Fumanelli	Italy	2025 Le Mans Cup	
Simon Gachet	France	2025 GT World Challenge Europe Endurance Cup / 2025 Intercontinental GT Challenge	
Tom Gamble	United Kingdom	2025 FIA World Endurance Championship / 2025 IMSA SportsCar Championship / 2024–25 Asian Le Mans Series	
Naoya Gamou	Japan	2025 Super Taikyu Series / 2025 Nürburgring Langstrecken-Serie / 2025 Super GT Series	
Michelle Gatting	Denmark	2024–25 Asian Le Mans Series / 2025 FIA World Endurance Championship / 2025 IMSA SportsCar Championship / 2025 European Le Mans Series	
Oliver Gavin	United Kingdom	2021 FIA World Endurance Championship / 2021 IMSA SportsCar Championship	
Alessandro Ghiretti	France	2025 Porsche Supercup / 2025 Porsche Carrera Cup Germany / 2025 Porsche Carrera Cup Australia	
Kuba Giermaziak	Poland	2024 Nürburgring Langstrecken Series / 2024 International GT Open	
Nestor Girolami	Argentina	2025 TCR World Tour	
Benjamin Goethe	Monaco	2025 GT World Challenge Europe / 2024–25 Asian Le Mans Series	
James Golding	Australia	2025 Australian National Trans-Am Series / 2025 Supercars Championship	
Marcos Gomes	Brazil	2024 Stock Car Pro Series	
Jeff Gordon	United States	2016 NASCAR Cup Series	
Mikael Grenier	Canada	2025 GT World Challenge America / 2025 Intercontinental GT Challenge / 2025 Nürburgring Langstrecken-Serie	
Matt Griffin	Ireland	2025 European Le Mans Series / 2025 British GT Championship / 2025 GT Winter Series	
Garett Grist	Canada	2025 Le Mans Cup	
Enzo Guibbert	France	2019 Porsche Carrera Cup France	
Ferdinand Habsburg	Austria	2025 FIA World Endurance Championship / 2025 European Le Mans Series	
Matt Halliday	New Zealand	2017 Intercontinental GT Challenge	
Joey Hand	United States	2025 IMSA SportsCar Championship	
Euan Hankey	United Kingdom	2023 British GT Championship	
Ben Hanley	United Kingdom	2023 IMSA SportsCar Championship/2023 European Le Mans Series	
Phil Hanson	United Kingdom	2025 FIA World Endurance Championship	
Jack Harvey	United Kingdom	2024 IndyCar Series	
Valentin Hasse-Clot	France	2025 European Le Mans Series / 2025 FIA World Endurance Championship / 2025 IMSA SportsCar Championship	
Dennis Hauger	Norway	2025 Indy NXT	
Jack Hawksworth	United Kingdom	2025 IMSA SportsCar Championship	
Todd Hazelwood	United Kingdom	2025 Trans-Am Series	
Andre Heimgartner	New Zealand	2025 Supercars Championship	
Tim Heinemann	Germany	2025 Nürburgring Langstrecken-Serie / 2025 Intercontinental GT Challenge	
Laurin Heinrich	Germany	2025 IMSA SportsCar Championship / 2024–25 Asian Le Mans Series / 2025 Intercontinental GT Challenge	
Max Hesse	Germany	2025 IMSA SportsCar Championship	
Jan Heylen	Belgium	2025 IMSA SportsCar Championship / 2025 GT World Challenge America	
J. R. Hildebrand	United States	2022 IndyCar Series	
Cameron Hill	Australia	2025 Supercars Championship	
James Hinchcliffe	Canada	2025 IMSA SportsCar Championship	
Trent Hindman	United States	2025 IMSA SportsCar Championship	
Kazuki Hiramine	Japan	2025 Super GT Series / 2025 Super Taikyu Series	
Katsuyuki Hiranaka	Japan	2025 Super GT Series / 2025 Super Taikyu Series	
Gary Hirsch	Switzerland	2015 European Le Mans Series season	
Jonathan Hirschi	Switzerland	2020 European Le Mans Series / 2020 Nürburgring Langstrecken-Serie	
Lee Holdsworth	Australia	2024 Supercars Championship	
Paul Holton	United States	2025 Michelin Pilot Challenge	
Marco Holzer	Germany	2025 Nürburgring Langstrecken-Serie	
Scott Huffaker	United States	2025 Lamborghini Super Trofeo North America	
Jake Hughes	United Kingdom	2024–25 Formula E World Championship	
Raoul Hyman	South Africa/United Kingdom	2023 Super Formula Championship	
Laurents Hörr	Germany	2025 European Le Mans Series / 2025 Prototype Winter Series / 2024–25 Asian Le Mans Series / 2025 Ultimate Cup European Series	
Yuji Ide	Japan	2022 Super GT Series / 2022 F4 Japanese Championship	
Alexandre Imperatori	Switzerland	2023 GT World Challenge Asia / 2023 Asian Le Mans Series	
Tom Ingram	United Kingdom	2023 British Touring Car Championship	
Matevos Isaakyan	Russia	2020 European Le Mans Series	
Daisuke Ito	Japan	2018 Blancpain GT Series Asia	
Jazeman Jaafar	Malaysia	2024 Lamborghini Super Trofeo Asia	
James Jakes	United Kingdom	2024 GT World Challenge Europe Sprint Cup / 2024 GT World Challenge Europe Endurance Cup	
Malthe Jakobsen	Denmark	2025 FIA World Endurance Championship / 2024–25 Asian Le Mans Series / 2025 IMSA SportsCar Championship	
Nicolas Jamin	France	2024 Lamborghini Super Trofeo North America	
Pierre-Alexandre Jean	France	2022 GT World Challenge Europe	
Mikkel Mac Jensen	Denmark	2025 GT Winter Series	
Sérgio Jimenez	Brazil	2023 Stock Car Pro Series	
Billy Johnson	United States	2025 Michelin Pilot Challenge	
Ed Jones	United Arab Emirates /United Kingdom	2024 NASCAR Xfinity Series	
Michel Jourdain Jr.	Mexico	2025 TCR World Tour	
Maxime Jousse	France	2019 Lamborghini Super Trofeo Asia / 2019 Porsche Carrera Cup Asia	
Matija Jurisic	Croatia	2019 Austrian Kart Championship	
Thomas Jäger	Germany	2019 International GT Open	
Pierre Kaffer	Germany	2025 Le Mans Cup	
Kyle Kaiser	United States	2019 IndyCar Series / 2019 IMSA SportsCar Championship	
Jonny Kane	United Kingdom	2017 Blancpain GT Series	
Steven Kane	United Kingdom	2019 Blancpain GT Series Endurance Cup	
Sage Karam	United States	2025 NASCAR Xfinity Series	
Niko Kari	Finland	2022 FIA Formula 3 Championship	
Narain Karthikeyan	India	2021 Asian Le Mans Series	
Tatsuya Kataoka	Japan	2025 Super Taikyu Series / 2025 Super GT Series	
Kohta Kawaai	Japan	2024 Nürburgring Langstrecken-Serie	
Phil Keen	United Kingdom	2025 British GT Championship	
Daniel Keilwitz	Germany	2024 Le Mans Cup / 2024 Prototype Winter Series	
Rick Kelly	Australia	2020 Supercars Championship	
Todd Kelly	Australia	2017 Supercars Championship	
Charlie Kimball	United States	2021 IndyCar Series	
Jordan King	United Kingdom	2023–24 Formula E World Championship	
Harry King	United Kingdom	2024–25 Asian Le Mans Series / 2025 GT World Challenge Asia	
Kyle Kirkwood	United States	2025 IndyCar Series / 2025 IMSA SportsCar Championship	
Norbert Kiss	Hungary	2025 European Truck Racing Championship	
Nicolai Kjaergaard	Denmark	2024 GT World Challenge Europe	
Marvin Klein	France	2025 Porsche Carrera Cup Germany / 2025 Porsche Carrera Cup Italia / 2025 Porsche Carrera Cup France / 2025 Porsche Supercup	
Jens Klingmann	Germany	2025 GT World Challenge Europe / 2025 Italian GT Championship	
Takashi Kobayashi	Japan	2025 Super GT Series	
Kenton Koch	United States	2026 IMSA SportsCar Championship	
Martin Kodrić	Croatia	2024 GT World Challenge Europe	
Takashi Kogure	Japan	2025 Super GT Series	
Kevin Korjus	Estonia	2016 Renault Sport Trophy	
Brodie Kostecki	Australia	2025 Supercars Championship	
Kazuto Kotaka	Japan	2025 Super Formula Championship / 2025 GT World Challenge Asia / 2025 Nürburgring Langstrecken-Serie	
Johan Kristoffersson	Sweden	2025 FIA World Rallycross Championship / 2025 Porsche Carrera Cup Scandinavia	
Christian Krognes	Norway	2025 Nürburgring Langstrecken Series	
Niklas Krütten	Germany	2024 Super GT Series	
Patrick Kujala	Finland	2025 British GT Championship	
Jesse Krohn	Finland	2025 IMSA SportsCar Championship / 2025 Nürburgring Langstrecken-Serie / 2025 Italian GT Championship / 2025 Intercontinental GT Challenge	
Haruki Kurosawa	Japan	2024 Super GT Series	
Kirill Ladygin	Russia	2021 World Touring Car Cup	
Andy Lally	United States	2025 Michelin Pilot Challenge	
Pedro Lamy	Portugal	2020 IMSA SportsCar Championship / 2019–20 FIA World Endurance Championship	
Jon Lancaster	United Kingdom	2024 GT4 European Series	
Konsta Lappalainen	Finland	2025 GT World Challenge Europe Sprint Cup	
Kyle Larson	United States	2025 NASCAR Cup Series / 2025 NASCAR Xfinity Series / 2025 NASCAR Craftsman Truck Series	
Thomas Laurent	France	2025 Le Mans Cup / 2025 European Le Mans Series	
Jack Le Brocq	Australia	2025 Supercars Championship	
Arthur Leclerc	Monaco	2025 GT World Challenge Europe Sprint Cup	
Jose Antonio Ledesma Rueda	Mexico	2018 Ginetta GT5 Challenge / 2018 Formula Mexico	
Katherine Legge	United Kingdom	2025 NASCAR Cup Series / 2025 NASCAR Xfinity Series	
Matheus Leist	Brazil	2025 Porsche Carrera Cup North America	
Brendon Leitch	New Zealand	2024–25 Asian Le Mans Series / 2025 Lamborghini Super Trofeo North America / 2025 GT World Challenge Australia	
Michael James Lewis	United States	2025 Nürburgring Langstrecken-Serie	
Edoardo Liberati	Italy	2025 Italian GT Championship	
Alex Lloyd	United Kingdom	2017 Pirelli World Challenge	
Vladislav Lomko	Russia	2024–25 Asian Le Mans Series / 2025 European Le Mans Series / 2025 Le Mans Cup	
Alessio Lorandi	Italy	2020 GT World Challenge Europe Endurance Cup	
Aaron Love	Australia	2025 Supercars Championship / 2025 GT World Challenge Australia	
Luca Ludwig	Germany	2025 Nürburgring Langstrecken Series / 2025 GT Winter Series	
Lucas Luhr	Germany	2022 NASCAR Whelen Euro Series	
Dino Lunardi	France	2024 Le Mans Cup	
Linus Lundqvist	Sweden	2024 IndyCar Series	
Richard Lyons	United Kingdom	2019 Super GT Series	
Qinghua Ma	China	2025 TCR World Tour	
Dean Macdonald	United Kingdom	2025 Intercontinental GT Challenge	
Callum MacLeod	United Kingdom	2025 British GT Championship	
Gilles Magnus	Belgium	2025 GT World Challenge Europe Sprint Cup / 2025 Deutsche Tourenwagen Masters	
Jan Magnussen	Denmark	2025 TCR Denmark	
Franck Mailleux	France	2024 Nürburgring Langstrecken-Serie	
Arjun Maini	India	2025 Intercontinental GT Challenge / 2025 Deutsche Tourenwagen Masters	
Tadasuke Makino	Japan	2025 Super GT Series / 2025 Super Formula Championship	
Matteo Malucelli	Italy	2023 Porsche Carrera Cup Italy	
Daniel Mancinelli	Italy	2024 FIA World Endurance Championship	
Kyle Marcelli	Canada	2025 GT World Challenge America / 2025 24H Series	
Jann Mardenborough	United Kingdom	2020 Super GT Series	
Artem Markelov	Russia	2020 FIA Formula 2 Championship	
John Martin	Australia	2024 TCR Australia Touring Car Series	
Victor Martins	France	2025 FIA Formula 2 Championship	
Esteban Masson	France	2025 Super Formula Lights / 2025 European Le Mans Series / 2024–25 Asian Le Mans Series / 2025 Nürburgring Langstrecken-Serie	
Keagan Masters	South Africa	2025 Porsche Supercup / 2025 Porsche Carrera Cup Italia / 2025 Porsche Carrera Cup France	
Raphael Matos	Brazil	2025 Trans-Am Series	
Takamitsu Matsui	Japan	2025 Super GT Series	
Kosuke Matsuura	Japan	2024 Super GT Series	
Ricardo Mauricio	Brazil	2025 Stock Car Pro Series	
Joey Mawson	Australia	2023 S5000 Australian Drivers' Championship	
Stevan McAleer	United Kingdom	2025 Michelin Pilot Challenge / 2025 IMSA SportsCar Championship	
Michael McDowell	United States	2025 NASCAR Cup Series / 2025 NASCAR Craftsman Truck Series	
Jamie McMurray	United States	2021 NASCAR Cup Series	
Michael Meadows	United Kingdom	2019 Blancpain GT Series Endurance Cup / 2019 International GT Open	
Casey Mears	United States	2019 Monster Energy NASCAR Cup Series	
Nigel Melker	Netherlands	2014 Formula Acceleration 1 season	
Nico Menzel	Germany	2024–25 Asian Le Mans Series / 2025 Nürburgring Langstrecken-Serie / 2025 GT World Challenge Asia	
Andy Meyrick	United Kingdom	2024 European Le Mans Series	
Charles Milesi	France	2025 FIA World Endurance Championship / 2025 European Le Mans Series	
Joel Miller	United States	2024 Lamborghini Super Trofeo North America	
Nicolas Minassian	France	2018 European Le Mans Series	
James Moffat	Australia	2025 Trans-Am Series	
Daniel Morad	Canada	2025 GT World Challenge Asia / 2025 IMSA SportsCar Championship	
Gianni Morbidelli	Italy	2019 TCR Europe Touring Car Series	
Seb Morris	United Kingdom	2025 British GT Championship	
Tommaso Mosca	Italy	2024 Italian GT Championship	
Jörg Müller	Germany	2022 Nürburgring Endurance Series	
Sven Müller	Germany	2025 Nürburgring Langstrecken-Serie / 2025 British GT Championship / 2025 Intercontinental GT Challenge / 2025 GT World Challenge Europe Sprint Cup	
Yvan Müller	Germany	2025 NASCAR Euro Series	
Cooper Murray	Australia	2025 Supercars Championship	
Daisuke Nakajima	Japan	2025 FIA World Endurance Championship / 2025 Nürburgring Langstrecken-Serie	
Yuichi Nakayama	Japan	2023 Super GT Series	
Yuhki Nakayama	Japan	2025 Super Taikyu Series	
James Nash	United Kingdom	2018 British Touring Car Championship	
Norman Nato	France	2024–25 Formula E World Championship / 2025 FIA World Endurance Championship	
Sam Neary	United Kingdom	2025 British GT Championship	
André Negrão	Brazil	2023 FIA World Endurance Championship	
Thomas Neubauer	France	2025 GT World Challenge Europe / 2025 Nürburgring Langstrecken-Serie	
Roy Nissany	Israel	2025 European Le Mans Series	
Colin Noble	United Kingdom	2025 Le Mans Cup	
Seita Nonaka	Japan	2025 Super GT Series / 2025 Super Formula Championship / 2025 Super Taikyu Series	
Clément Novalak	France	2025 European Le Mans Series	
Tristan Nunez	United States	2024 Prototype Challenge	
Christoffer Nygaard	Denmark	2024 24H Series	
Kakunoshin Ohta	Japan	2025 Super Formula Championship / 2025 IMSA SportsCar Championship / 2025 Super Taikyu Series	
Jayden Ojeda	Australia	2025 GT World Challenge Australia / 2025 GT World Challenge Asia / 2025 Toyota Gazoo Racing Australia 86 Series	
Tom Onslow-Cole	United Kingdom	2021 British GT Championship	
Lucas Ordóñez	Spain	2019 Intercontinental GT Challenge / 2019 VLN Series	
Stephane Ortelli	Monaco	2020 International GT Open	
Egor Orudzhev	Kyrgyzstan/Russia	2024 Lamborghini Super Trofeo Europe	
Joe Osborne	United Kingdom	2022 Asian Le Mans Series / 2022 International GT Open / 2022 International GT Open	
Hiroki Otsu	Japan	2025 Super GT Series	
Jusuf Owega	Germany	2025 GT World Challenge Europe / 2025 Nürburgring Langstrecken-Serie	
Will Owen	United States	2023 GT4 America Series	
Toshiki Oyu	Japan	2025 Super Formula Championship / 2025 Super GT Series	
Mike Parisy	France	2023 GT4 European Series / 2023 French GT4 Cup	
Matt Parry	United Kingdom	2019 Blancpain GT Series Endurance Cup	
Nicky Pastorelli	Netherlands	2019 24H GT Series	
Maximilian Paul	Germany	2025 Intercontinental GT Challenge / 2025 Deutsche Tourenwagen Masters	
Milos Pavlovic	Serbia	2025 GT Winter Series	
Matthew Payne	New Zealand	2025 Supercars Championship	
Nick Percat	Australia	2025 Supercars Championship	
Dylan Pereira	Luxemburg	2025 GT World Challenge Europe / 2025 GT World Challenge Asia	
Jack Perkins	Australia	2024 Super2 Series / 2024 Supercars Championship	
Alex Peroni	Australia	2025 GT World Challenge Australia	
Gianluca Petecof	Brazil	2025 Stock Car Pro Series	
Alessio Picariello	Belgium	2025 Nürburgring Langstrecken-Serie / 2025 GT World Challenge Asia / 2025 European Le Mans Series / 2025 Intercontinental GT Challenge / 2024–25 Asian Le Mans Series	
Andrea Piccini	Italy	2021 FIA World Endurance Championship	
Giacomo Piccini	Italy	2020 Le Mans Cup	
Josh Pierson	United States	2025 Formula Regional Oceania Championship / 2025 Indy NXT	
Spencer Pigot	United States	2021 IMSA SportsCar Championship / 2021 Michelin Pilot Challenge	
Ramon Pineiro	Spain	2011 FIA Formula Two Championship	
Edoardo Piscopo	Italy	2022 Lamborghini Super Trofeo North America	
David Pittard	United Kingdom	2025 Nürburgring Langstrecken-Serie	
Andrea Pizzitola	France	2019 European Le Mans Series	
Antonio Pizzonia	Brazil	2024 BOSS GP	
Jim Pla	United Kingdom	2025 GT World Challenge Europe	
Vito Postiglione	Italy	2024 Italian GT Championship	
Alexandre Premat	France	2024 Lamborghini Super Trofeo North America / 2024 Michelin Pilot Challenge	
Sebastian Priaulx	United Kingdom	2025 IMSA SportsCar Championship	
Leonardo Pulcini	Italy	2025 Italian GT Championship Endurance Cup	
James Pull	United Kingdom	2025 Super Taikyu Series	
Scott Pye	Australia	2025 Supercars Championship	
Adrian Quaife-Hobbs	United Kingdom	2016 Le Mans Cup	
Alex Quinn	United Kingdom	2024–25 Asian Le Mans Series / 2025 European Le Mans Series	
Klark Quinn	Australia	2016 Australian GT Championship	
Martin Ragginger	Austria	2024 Nürburgring Langstrecken Series / 2024 Porsche Carrera Cup Asia	
Graham Rahal	United States	2025 IndyCar Series	
César Ramos	Brazil	2025 Stock Car Pro Series	
Thomas Randle	Australia	2025 Supercars Championship / 2025 GT World Challenge Australia	
Christian Rasmussen	Denmark	2025 IndyCar Series	
Oliver Rasmussen	Denmark	2025 Super Formula Championship	
Sean Rayhall	United States	2024 World of Outlaws Sprintcars	
Karl Reindler	Australia	2017 Supercars Championship	
Robert Renauer	Germany	2024–25 Asian Le Mans Series	
David Reynolds	Australia	2025 Supercars Championship	
Alex Riberas	Spain	2025 IMSA SportsCar Championship / 2025 FIA World Endurance Championship	
Giacomo Ricci	Italy	2013 Auto GP season	
Buddy Rice	United States	2017 IMSA SportsCar Championship	
Stéphane Richelmi	Monaco	2024 European Le Mans Series	
Ricardo Risatti	Argentina	2025 Turismo Carretera / 2025 Turismo Nacional Argentina	
Charlie Robertson	United Kingdom	2025 British GT Championship / 2025 GT4 Winter Series	
Felix Rosenqvist	Sweden	2026 IndyCar Series	
Arthur Rougier	France	2025 GT World Challenge Europe Endurance Cup / 2025 GT World Challenge Europe Sprint Cup	
Paolo Ruberti	Italy	2025 Italian GT Championship Endurance Cup	
Roman Rusinov	Russia	2021 European Le Mans Series	
Sebastian Saavedra	Colombia	2023 Lamborghini Super Trofeo North America	
Edward Sandström	Sweden	2018 Nürburgring Endurance Series	
Ukyo Sasahara	Japan	2025 Super GT Series	
Daiki Sasaki	Japan	2025 Super GT Series	
Marino Sato	Japan	2025 European Le Mans Series / 2025 FIA World Endurance Championship	
Grégoire Saucy	Switzerland	2025 FIA World Endurance Championship / 2025 European Le Mans Series	
Frederik Schandorff	Denmark	2025 IMSA SportsCar Championship	
Fabio Scherer	Switzerland	2025 Deutsche Tourenwagen Masters	
Fabian Schiller	Germany	2025 Nürburgring Langstrecken-Serie / 2025 GT World Challenge Europe Endurance Cup / 2025 European Le Mans Series / 2025 Intercontinental GT Challenge / 2024–25 Asian Le Mans Series	
Steijn Schothorst	Netherlands	2022 GT World Challenge Europe Endurance Cup	
Ralf Schumacher	Germany	2024 Prototype Cup Germany	
Morris Schuring	Netherlands	2025 Deutsche Tourenwagen Masters / 2025 Intercontinental GT Challenge / 2025 Nürburgring Langstrecken-Serie	
Jeff Segal	United States	2022 IMSA SportsCar Championship	
Yuhi Sekiguchi	Japan	2025 Super GT Series	
Bryan Sellers	United States	2024 GT World Challenge America / 2024 IMSA SportsCar Championship	
Oriol Servia	Spain	2017 IndyCar Series	
Sérgio Sette Câmara	Brazil	2024–25 Formula E World Championship / 2025 European Le Mans Series / 2025 Le Mans Cup	
Jan Seyffarth	Germany	2019 Nürburgring Endurance Series	
Gordon Shedden	United Kingdom	2022 British Touring Car Championship	
Mark Shulzhitskiy	Russia	2015 Blancpain GT Sprint Series	
Norbert Siedler	Austria	2025 Nürburgring Langstrecken-Serie	
Nolan Siegel	United States	2025 IndyCar Series	
Jean-Baptiste Simmenauer	France	2025 GT World Challenge Asia / 2025 European Le Mans Series	
Andreas Simonsen	Sweden	2019 VLN Series	
Kyffin Simpson	Barbados	2025 IndyCar Series	
Mike Simpson	United Kingdom	2025 French GT4 Cup	
Elliot Skeer	United States	2025 IMSA SportsCar Championship	
Josh Skelton	United Kingdom	2023 Le Mans Cup	
Tim Slade	Australia	2025 Toyota Gazoo Racing Australia 86 Series / 2025 TA2 Muscle Car Series	
Adam Smalley	United Kingdom	2025 GT World Challenge Europe / 2025 Britcar Endurance Championship	
Guy Smith	United Kingdom	2023 European Le Mans Series / 2023 Le Mans Cup	
Madison Snow	United States	2025 IMSA SportsCar Championship	
Maxime Soulet	Belgium	2023 GT World Challenge Europe Endurance Cup / 2023 Nürburgring Langstrecken-Serie	
Loris Spinelli	Italy	2025 GT World Challenge Europe / 2025 GT World Challenge Asia	
Jamie Stanley	United Kingdom	2025 Britcar Endurance Championship	
Dean Stoneman	United Kingdom	2020 Lamborghini Super Trofeo Europe	
Joel Sturm	Germany	2024–25 Asian Le Mans Series / 2025 Intercontinental GT Challenge / 2025 Nürburgring Langstrecken-Serie	
Ashley Sutton	United Kingdom	2025 British Touring Car Championship	
Alex Tagliani	Canada	2025 NASCAR Canada Series	
Mitsunori Takaboshi	Japan	2025 Super GT Series / 2025 Super Formula Championship	
Adrien Tambay	France	2022 GT4 European Series	
Duncan Tappy	United Kingdom	2023 GT Cup Championship	
Salvatore Tavano	Italy	2024 TCR Italy	
Aaron Telitz	United States	2025 IMSA SportsCar Championship / 2024–25 Asian Le Mans Series / 2025 GT World Challenge America	
Larry ten Voorde	Netherlands	2024 Porsche Supercup / 2024 Porsche Carrera Cup Italia / 2024 Porsche Carrera Cup Germany / 2024 Porsche Carrera Cup Benelux	
Peter Terting	Germany	2025 GT4 Winter Series	
Ryuichiro Tomita	Japan	2025 Super GT Series / 2025 Super Taikyu Series	
Sam Tordoff	United Kingdom	2019 British Touring Car Championship	
Simon Trummer	Switzerland	2021 FIA World Endurance Championship	
Ho-Pin Tung	Netherlands/China	2019–20 FIA World Endurance Championship	
Darren Turner	United Kingdom	2025 GT World Challenge America	
Filip Ugran	Romania	2024 European Le Mans Series / 2024 Porsche Sprint Challenge Southern Europe	
Santiago Urrutia	Uruguay	2025 TCR World Tour	
Kay van Berlo	Netherlands	2025 GT4 America Series	
Carlo van Dam	Netherlands	2023 Nürburgring Langstrecken Series	
Chris van der Drift	New Zealand	2024–25 Asian Le Mans Series / 2025 GT World Challenge Asia	
Tijmen van der Helm	Netherlands	2025 IMSA SportsCar Championship	
Jaap van Lagen	Netherlands	2025 Porsche Supercup / 2025 Porsche Carrera Cup Benelux	
Johannes van Overbeek	United States	2023 Lamborghini Super Trofeo North America	
Job van Uitert	Netherlands	2025 European Le Mans Series / 2024–25 Asian Le Mans Series	
Nicolás Varrone	Argentina	2024–25 Asian Le Mans Series / 2025 FIA World Endurance Championship / 2025 IMSA SportsCar Championship	
Tristan Vautier	France	2024–25 Asian Le Mans Series / 2025 European Le Mans Series / 2025 IMSA SportsCar Championship	
Matthieu Vaxivière	France	2025 IMSA SportsCar Championship / 2025 European Le Mans Series / 2024–25 Asian Le Mans Series	
Zach Veach	United States	2025 Michelin Pilot Challenge	
Rinus Veekay	Netherlands	2025 IndyCar Series	
Giovanni Venturini	Italy	2021 GT World Challenge America	
Neil Verhagen	United States	2025 IMSA SportsCar Championship	
Thierry Vermeulen	Netherlands	2025 GT World Challenge Europe / 2025 Deutsche Tourenwagen Masters / 2025 GT World Challenge Asia	
Richard Verschoor	Netherlands	2025 FIA Formula 2 Championship	
Jos Verstappen	Netherlands	2008 Le Mans Series	
Frederic Vervisch	Belgium	2025 IMSA SportsCar Championship	
David Vidales	Spain	2025 Italian GT Championship Endurance Cup	
Ander Vilarino	Spain	2020 NASCAR Whelen Euro Series	
Jüri Vips	Estonia	2024 IndyCar Series	
Bent Viscaal	Netherlands	2025 European Le Mans Series	
Andrew Watson	United Kingdom	2024 British Touring Car Championship	
Oliver Webb	United Kingdom	2025 British GT Championship	
Karl Wendlinger	Austria	2016 ADAC GT Masters	
Jeff Westphal	United States	2025 Michelin Pilot Challenge	
Mark Wilkins	Canada	2025 Michelin Pilot Challenge	
Ollie Wilkinson	United Kingdom	2022 GT World Challenge Europe Endurance Cup / 2022 GT World Challenge Europe Sprint Cup	
Calan Williams	Australia	2024 GT World Challenge Europe	
Lewis Williamson	United Kingdom	2024 GT World Challenge Europe Endurance Cup	
Mark Winterbottom	Australia	2024 Supercars Championship	
Dale Wood	Australia	2025 Porsche Carrera Cup Australia	
Ryan Wood	New Zealand	2025 Supercars Championship / 2025 GT World Challenge Australia	
Hideki Yamauchi	Japan	2025 Super GT Series	
Masataka Yanagida	Japan	2023 Super GT Series	
Hironobu Yasuda	Japan	2025 Super GT Series / 2025 Super Taikyu Series	
Yifei Ye	China	2025 FIA World Endurance Championship	
Alex Yoong	Malaysia	2018 Blancpain GT Series Asia	
Daniel Zampieri	Italy	2021 Italian GT Championship	
Marius Zug	Germany	2023 GT World Challenge Europe Endurance Cup	
