= Jeff Westphal =

American racing driver (born 1986)

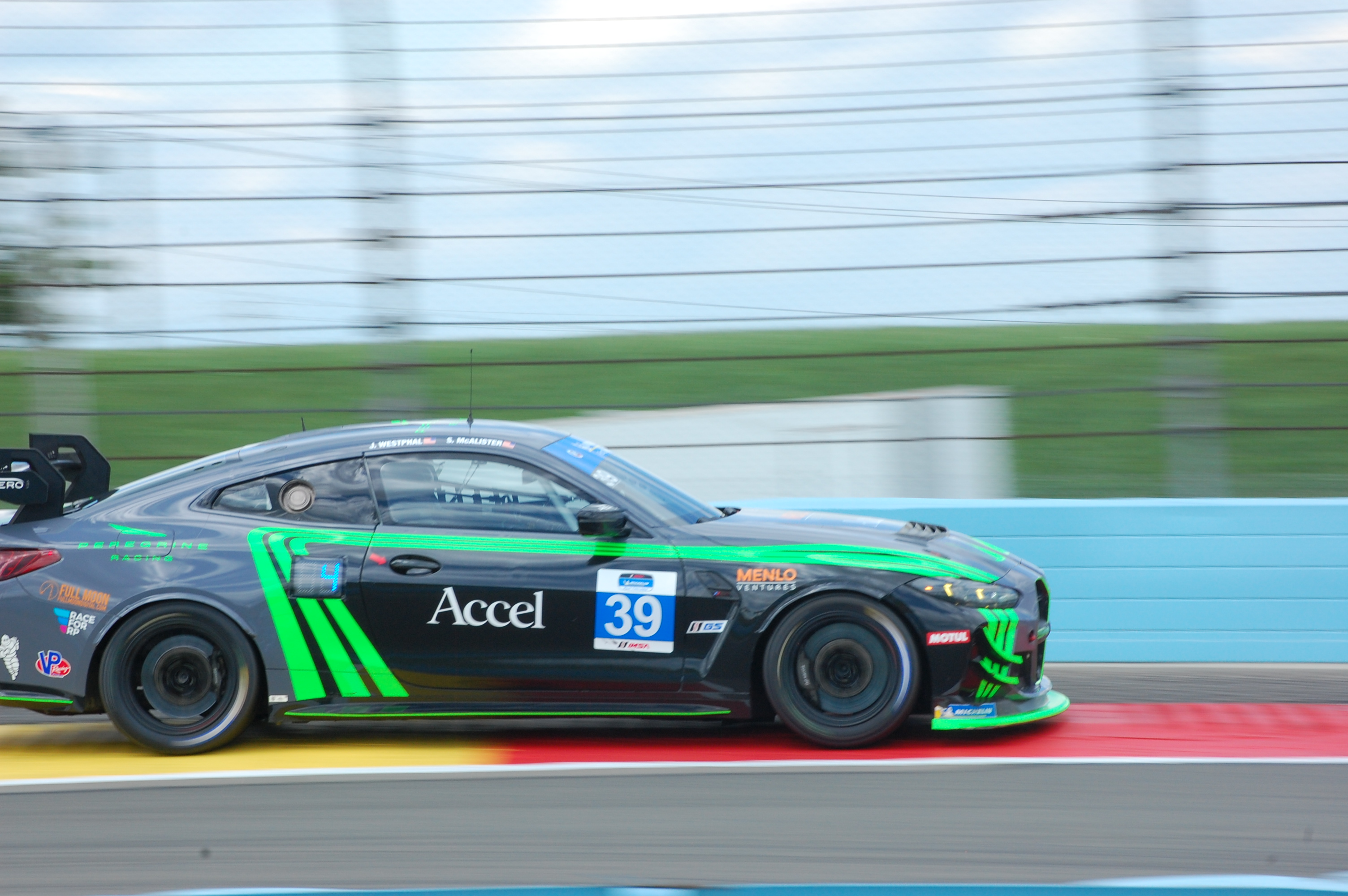
- Westphal's Carbahn BMW in 2025
- Nationality: (United States) American
- Born: July 22, 1986 (age 40) Littleton, Colorado, U.S.
- Categorisation: FIA Silver (until 2021); FIA Gold (2022–)

Championship titles
- 2019 2008: Michelin Pilot Challenge – GS; Pacific F2000

Jeffrey Westphal (born July 22, 1986) is an American racing driver who last competed in the GS class of the Michelin Pilot Challenge for CarBahn with Peregrine Racing. A race winner in IMSA for Scuderia Corsa, he made headlines in 2017 by driving the Glickenhaus SCG 003 to pole position at the 24 Hours of Nürburgring.

== Career ==
Westphal made his single-seater debut in 2006, racing in Formula Russell. Racing in single-seaters until 2008, Westphal most notably won the Pacific F2000 title the same year for PR1 Motorsport. Westphal then raced part-time in the Rolex Sports Car Series in the following two years, before making select appearances in the Continental Tire Sports Car Challenge in the following two seasons.

In 2013, Westphal joined Scuderia Corsa to race a Ferrari 458 in select rounds of the GT class of the Rolex Sports Car Series. Taking part in six races, Westphal scored four podiums, with a best result of second at Barber and Belle Isle. Staying with Scuderia Corsa for the full United SportsCar Championship season in 2014, Westphal scored wins at Belle Isle and Indianapolis, as well as a second-place finish at VIR, en route to a ninth-place points finish. The following year, Westphal remained with Scuderia Corsa for select rounds of the United SportsCar Championship, as well as driving for Scuderia Cameron Glickenhaus in the VLN Series.

After continuing with Scuderia Cameron Glickenhaus into 2016 and finishing second in the SPX class at the 24 Hours of Nürburgring, Westphal joined its customer Traum Motorsport for 2017, in which he scored a surprise overall pole position at the 24 Hours of Nürburgring. In 2018, Westphal joined Carbahn Motorsports to compete in the Continental Tire SportsCar Challenge, scoring a best result of third at Laguna Seca as he ended the year fifth in points aboard an Audi R8 LMS GT4. Remaining with the team for the following year, Westphal scored a lone win at Sebring and five other podiums to secure the GS title. During 2019, Westphal also returned to Scuderia Corsa for select rounds of the IMSA SportsCar Championship, driving the Ferrari 488 GT3 to a best result of third at Sebring and Watkins Glen.

Staying with CarBahn Motorsports with Peregrine Racing for 2020, Westphal took wins at Sebring and Laguna Seca, as well as three more podiums to secure runner-up honors in GS. In parallel, Westphal also raced for Scuderia Corsa in the endurance rounds of the IMSA SportsCar Championship, most notably winning Petit Le Mans in GTD. Westphal then joined CarBahn with Peregrine in its step up to the IMSA SportsCar Championship the following year, as he scored a best result of fourth at Watkins Glen en route to a 13th-place points finish. A switch to the Lamborghini Huracán brought greater success in 2022, as Westphal scored three podiums and a best result of second at Laguna Seca and Road America, ending the year seventh in GTD.

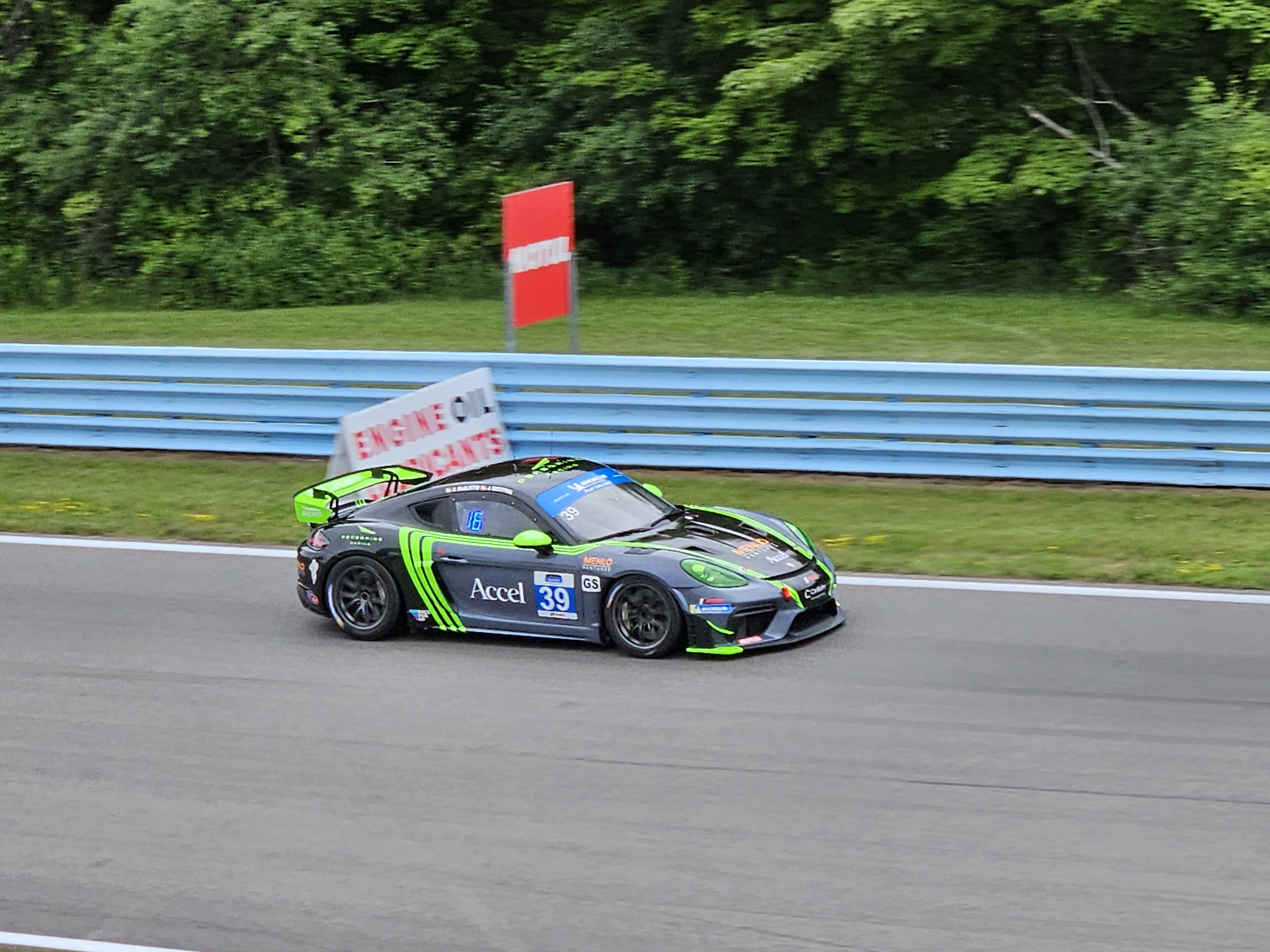
Westphal's CarBahn Porsche in 2023.

Moving back to Michelin Pilot Challenge for 2023 with CarBahn with Peregrine, Westphal scored a best result of fourth at Detroit and finished the year ninth in points at the wheel of a Porsche 718 Cayman. Having switched to BMW machinery for the 2024 season, the crew scored a lone win at Indianapolis and a third-place finish at Road Atlanta to round out the year 11th in points. In 2025, Westphal continued with the team for his sixth full-time season in the series, taking wins at Sebring and Mosport, as well as finishing third at Watkins Glen to secure runner-up honors in GS.

Westphal remained with CarBahn with Peregrine Racing to continue racing in the GS class of the Michelin Pilot Challenge in 2026. In his fourth consecutive season with the team, Westphal took a best result of third at both Mid-Ohio (from pole) and Indianapolis to end the year 26th in points.

== Racing record ==
=== Racing career summary ===
Season	Series	Team	Races	Wins	Poles	F/Laps	Podiums	Points	Position
2006	Formula Russell		17	2	0	0	7	179	**3rd**
2006	Pacific Formula F2000		2	0	0	0	0	21	30th
2007	Pacific Formula F2000	G.FRO	12	0	1	0	7	225	**3rd**
2008	Pacific Formula F2000	PR1 Motorsports	12	10	8	8	12	349	**1st**
2009	Rolex Sports Car Series – GT	PR1 Motorsports	4	0	0	0	0	67	31st
2010	Rolex Sports Car Series – GT	Corsa Team PR1	1	0	0	0	0	20	52nd
2011	Continental Tire Sports Car Challenge – ST	Insight Racing	2	0	1	0	0	46	43rd
2012	Continental Tire Sports Car Challenge – ST	Insight Racing	2	0	0	0	0	41	47th
2013	Rolex Sports Car Series – GT	Scuderia Corsa	6	0	0	0	4	175	14th
2013	Trofeo Maserati World Series		2	0	0	0	0	8	23rd
2014	United SportsCar Championship – GTD	Scuderia Corsa	11	2	0	0	3	269	9th
2014	Continental Tire Sports Car Challenge – ST	Burton Racing	1	0	0	0	0	28	61st
2015	United SportsCar Championship – GTD	Scuderia Corsa	2	0	0	0	0	27	39th
2015	VLN Series – SP7	Scuderia Cameron Glickenhaus	1	0	0	0	1	0	NC
2015	24 Hours of Nürburgring – SPX	Scuderia Cameron Glickenhaus	0	0	0	0	0	—N/a	DNS
2016	24H Series – A6	Scuderia Cameron Glickenhaus	1	0	0	0	0	0	NC
2016	24 Hours of Nürburgring – SPX	Scuderia Cameron Glickenhaus	1	0	0	0	1	—N/a	**2nd**
2017	VLN Series – SPX	Traum Motorsport	2	2	0	0	2	0	NC
2017	24 Hours of Nürburgring – SPX	Traum Motorsport	1	0	1	0	0	—N/a	DNF
2017	Intercontinental GT Challenge	Rearden Racing	1	0	0	0	0	2	15th
2018	Continental Tire SportsCar Challenge – GS	Carbahn Motorsports	10	0	0	0	1	225	5th
2018	IMSA Michelin Encore – GS	Carbahn Motorsports	1	0	0	0	0	—N/a	DNF
2018	24 Hours of Nürburgring – SPX	Scuderia Cameron Glickenhaus	1	1	0	0	1	—N/a	**1st**
2018	California 8 Hours – GT3	Vital Speed Motorsport	1	0	0	0	0	—N/a	DNF
2018	24H GT Series – A6-Am	LightSpeed Racing	1	0	0	0	0	0	NC
2019	Michelin Pilot Challenge – GS	Carbahn Motorsports	10	1	0	0	6	272	**1st**
2019	IMSA SportsCar Championship – GTD	Scuderia Corsa	4	0	0	0	2	94	27th
2020	Michelin Pilot Challenge – GS	CarBahn Motorsports with Peregrine Racing	10	2	0	0	5	260	**2nd**
2020	IMSA SportsCar Championship – GTD	Scuderia Corsa	4	1	0	0	1	109	25th
2020	GT World Challenge America – Pro-Am	Vital Speed	3	0	0	0	0	28	14th
2020	Intercontinental GT Challenge	Vital Speed	1	0	0	0	0	0	NC
2021	GT4 America Series – Pro-Am	Rearden Racing	2	0	0	0	0	6	21st
2021	GT4 America Series – Silver	Rearden Racing	2	0	0	0	1	24	13th
2021	IMSA SportsCar Championship – GTD	CarBahn Motorsports with Peregrine Racing	9	0	0	0	0	1817	13th
2021	24H GT Series – GT4	Car Collection Motorsport	1	0	0	0	1	16	11th
2022	IMSA SportsCar Championship – GTD	CarBahn with Peregrine Racing	11	0	0	0	3	2651	7th
2022	GT World Challenge America – Pro	Andretti Autosport x Vital Speed	1	0	0	0	0	0	NC
2023	Michelin Pilot Challenge – GS	CarBahn with Peregrine Racing	10	0	0	0	0	1870	9th
2024	Michelin Pilot Challenge – GS	CarBahn with Peregrine Racing	10	1	1	0	2	2130	11th
2024	24H Series – GT3	Pellin Racing	1	0	0	0	0	14	32nd
2025	Michelin Pilot Challenge – GS	CarBahn with Peregrine Racing	10	2	1	0	3	2650	**2nd**
2025	Gulf 12 Hours – Pro-Am	Pellin Racing	1	0	0	0	0	—N/a	7th
2026	Michelin Pilot Challenge – GS	CarBahn with Peregrine Racing	9	0	1	0	2	1360	26th
2026	24H Series – GT3	Pellin Racing	2	0	0	0	0	32	30th

=== Complete Grand-Am Rolex Sports Car Series results ===
(key) (Races in bold indicate pole position; results in italics indicate fastest lap)

Year	Team	Class	Make	Engine	1	2	3	4	5	6	7	8	9	10	11	12	Rank	Points
2009	PR1 Motorsports	GT	BMW M6	Pontiac 6.0L V8	DAY; 11	VIR	NJMP	LAG	WGL	MOH	DAY	BAR; 12	WGL; 13	CGV; 4	MIL	MIA	31st	67
2010	Corsa Team PR1	GT	BMW M6	BMW 5.0L V8	DAY; 11	MIA	BAR	VIR	LIM	WGL	MOH	DAY	NJMP	WGL	CGV	MIL	52nd	20
2013	Scuderia Corsa	GT	Ferrari 458 Italia	Ferrari 4.5L V8	DAY	COA	BAR; 2	ATL; 3	BEL; 2	MOH; 6	WGL; 5	IMS	ELK	KNS	LAG	LIM; 3	14th	175

=== Complete Michelin Pilot Challenge results ===
(key) (Races in bold indicate pole position) (Races in italics indicate fastest lap)

Year	Entrant	Class	Make	1	2	3	4	5	6	7	8	9	10	11	12	Rank	Points
2011	Insight Racing	Street Tuner	BMW 328i	DAY	HMS	BAR; 9	VIR	LIM	WGL; 7	ELK	LGA	NJMP	MOH			43rd	46
2012	Insight Racing	Street Tuner	BMW 328i	DAY; 15	BAR; 6	HMS	NJMP	MOH	ELK	WGL	IMS	LGA	LIM			47th	41
2014	Burton Racing	Street Tuner	BMW 128i	DAY	SEB	LGA	LIM	KAN	WGL	MOS	IMS	ELK	VIR	COA; 4	ATL	61st	28
2018	Carbahn Motorsports	Grand Sport	Audi R8 LMS GT4	DAY; 22	SEB; 5	MOH; 12	WGL; 4	MOS; 6	LIM; 18	ELK; 4	VIR; 12	LGA; 3	ATL; 4			5th	225
2019	Carbahn Motorsports	Grand Sport	Audi R8 LMS GT4	DAY; 16	SEB; 1	MOH; 3	WGL; 3	MOS; 4	LIM; 2	**ELK**; 4	**VIR**; 2	**LGA**; 2	ATL; 21			1st	272
2020	CarBahn Motorsports with Peregrine Racing	Grand Sport	Audi R8 LMS GT4	DAY; 4												2nd	260
2020	CarBahn Motorsports with Peregrine Racing	Grand Sport	Audi R8 LMS GT4 Evo		**SEB**; 1	ELK; 3	VIR; 12	ATL; 4	MOH; 1; 2	MOH; 2; 3	**ATL**; 19	**LAG**; 1	**SEB**; 21			2nd	260
2023	CarBahn with Peregrine Racing	Grand Sport	Porsche 718 Cayman GT4 RS Clubsport	DAY; 27	SEB; 12	LGA; 7	DET; 4	WGL; 8	MOS; 9	ELK; 9	VIR; 17					9th	1870
2023	CarBahn with Peregrine Racing	Grand Sport	BMW M4 GT4									IMS; 9	ATL; 22			9th	1870
2024	CarBahn with Peregrine Racing	Grand Sport	BMW M4 GT4 Gen II	**DAY**; 23	SEB; 9	LGA; 17	MOH; 24	WGL; 5	MOS; 4	ELK; 6	VIR; 13	IMS; 1	ATL; 3			11th	2130
2025	CarBahn with Peregrine Racing	Grand Sport	BMW M4 GT4 Evo (G82)	DAY; 12	SEB; 1	**LGA**; 4	MOH; 18	WGL; 3	MOS; 1	ELK; 4	VIR; 8	IMS; 5	ATL; 4			2nd	2650
2026	CarBahn with Peregrine Racing	Grand Sport	BMW M4 GT4 Evo (G82)	DAY; 30	SEB; 24	LGA; 13	**MOH**; 3	WGL; 18	MOS; 7	ELK; 25	VIR	IMS; 3	ATL; 24			26th	1360

=== Complete IMSA SportsCar Championship results ===
(key) (Races in bold indicate pole position; races in italics indicate fastest lap)

Year	Entrant	Class	Make	Engine	1	2	3	4	5	6	7	8	9	10	11	12	Rank	Points
2014	Scuderia Corsa	GTD	Ferrari 458 Italia GT3	Ferrari 4.5L V8	DAY; 11	SEB; 18	LGA; 7	DET; 1	WGL; 5	MOS; 17†	IND; 1	ELK; 16†	VIR; 2	COA; 11	PET; 9		9th	269
2015	Scuderia Corsa	GTD	Ferrari 458 Italia GT3	Ferrari 4.5L V8	DAY; 6	SEB	LGA	DET	WGL	LIM	ELK	VIR	COA	PET; 6			39th	27
2019	Scuderia Corsa	GTD	Ferrari 488 GT3	Ferrari F154CB 3.9 Turbo V8	DAY; 23	SEB; 3	MOH	DET	WGL; 3	MOS	LIM	ELK	VIR	LGA	PET; 5		27th	94
2020	Scuderia Corsa	GTD	Ferrari 488 GT3	Ferrari F154CB 3.9 Turbo V8	DAY; 7	DAY	SEB	ELK	VIR	ATL; 9	MOH	CLT	PET; 1	LGA	SEB; 4		25th	109
2021	CarBahn Motorsports with Peregrine Racing	GTD	Audi R8 LMS Evo	Audi DAR 5.2 L V10	DAY	SEB	MOH; 7	DET; 12	WGL; 9	WGL; 4	LIM; 6	ELK; 10	LGA; 7	LBH; 5	VIR; 7	PET	13th	1817
2022	CarBahn with Peregrine Racing	GTD	Lamborghini Huracán GT3 Evo	Lamborghini 5.2 L V10	DAY; 17	SEB; 13	LBH; 11	LGA; 2	MOH; 4	DET; 6	WGL; 7	MOS	LIM; 3	ELK; 2	VIR; 11	PET; 15	7th	2651
