= Suellio Almeida =

Canadian-born Brazilian racing driver

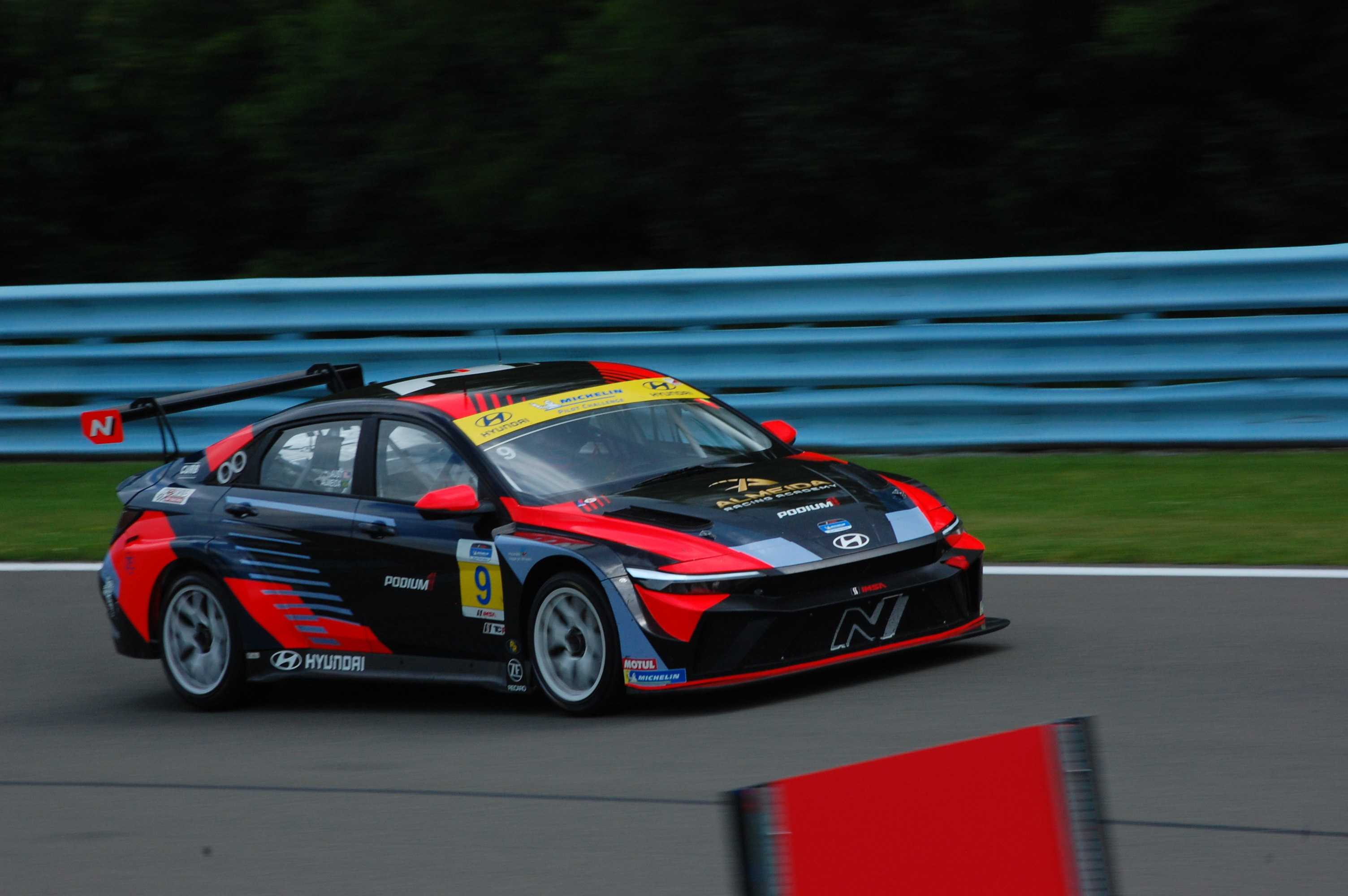
- Nationality: (Brazil) Brazilian
- Born: Suellio Phil Almeida; 4 March 1994 (age 32) Montreal, Quebec, Canada

Michelin Pilot Challenge
- Categorisation: FIA Silver
- Car number: 9
- Former teams: Bryan Herta Autosport with Curb-Agajanian
- Starts: 10
- Wins: 0
- Podiums: 0
- Poles: 0
- Best finish: 8th in 2025

Previous series
- 2025 2025 2024 2024: Michelin Pilot Challenge - TCR; Gulf ProCar Championship - Class 2CUP; Prototype Cup Germany; Radical Cup North America - Pro 1340

Championship titles
- 2024: Radical Cup North America - Pro 1340

Suellio Phil Almeida (born March 4, 1994) is a Canadian-born Brazilian racing driver, sim racer, and content creator. He most recently competed in the 2025 Michelin Pilot Challenge with Bryan Herta Autosport in the TCR class alongside Maddie Aust. Almeida's racing background is unconventional, initially starting out in sim racing and carrying no previous on-track experience before entering his first professional season in 2024.

Almeida is currently an ambassador for Logitech G.

== Career ==
Prior to motor racing, Almeida was a professional pianist in Canada, where he also studied civil engineering for three years. In 2018, Almeida got into sim racing for the first time, regularly spending time in iRacing, where he later became a professional sim racer and a full-time coach, which he continues to do.

In February 2024, Almeida entered the Radical Cup North America series, racing with Graham Rahal Performance in the Pro 1340 class in a Radical SR3. Two months later, he competed in the Gulf Radical Cup for a race at the Dubai Autodrome, finishing in second, securing a podium in the process. At season's end, he won the Pro 1340 class championship as a rookie ahead of Chris McMurry, whom he fought against for the points lead for the majority of the season. Almeida also competed in two rounds of the 2024 Prototype Cup Germany season, racing with DataLab Sports with Rinaldi alongside Luca Link.

In January 2025, Almeida was confirmed to race in the 2025 Michelin Pilot Challenge with Bryan Herta Autosport in the TCR class alongside Madison Aust. He returned to the Middle East the following month for a one-off appearance in the Gulf ProCar Championship at Yas Marina Circuit with Ibby Hadded. Almeida and Aust completed the Michelin Pilot Challenge season eighth in class, with three finishes inside the top-five.

== Racing record ==
Season	Series	Team	Races	Wins	Poles	F/Laps	Podiums	Points	Position
2024	Prototype Cup Germany	DataLab Sports with Rinaldi	5	0	0	0	0	38	10th
2024	Radical Cup North America - Pro 1340	Graham Rahal Performance	18	-	-	-	-	738	1st
2025	Gulf ProCar Championship - Class 2CUP	ARMotos	2	1	2	0	2	45	10th
2025	Michelin Pilot Challenge - TCR	Bryan Herta Autosport with Curb-Agajanian	10	0	0	0	0	2360	8th
