= 2025 Michelin Pilot Challenge =

Motor racing competition

The 2025 Michelin Pilot Challenge was the twenty-sixth season of the IMSA SportsCar Challenge and the twelfth season organized by the International Motor Sports Association (IMSA). The season began on January 26 at Daytona International Speedway and finished on October 10 at Road Atlanta.

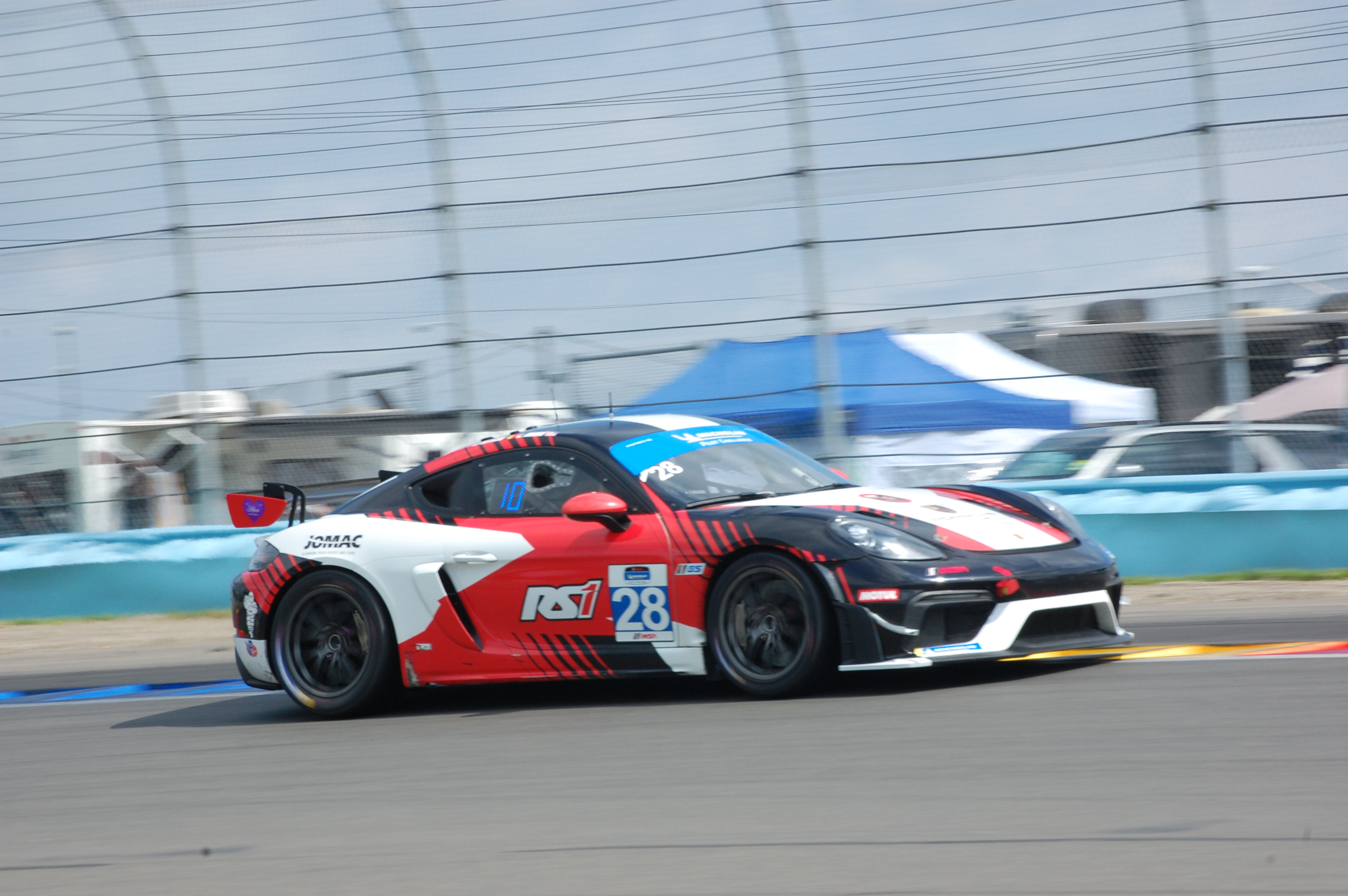
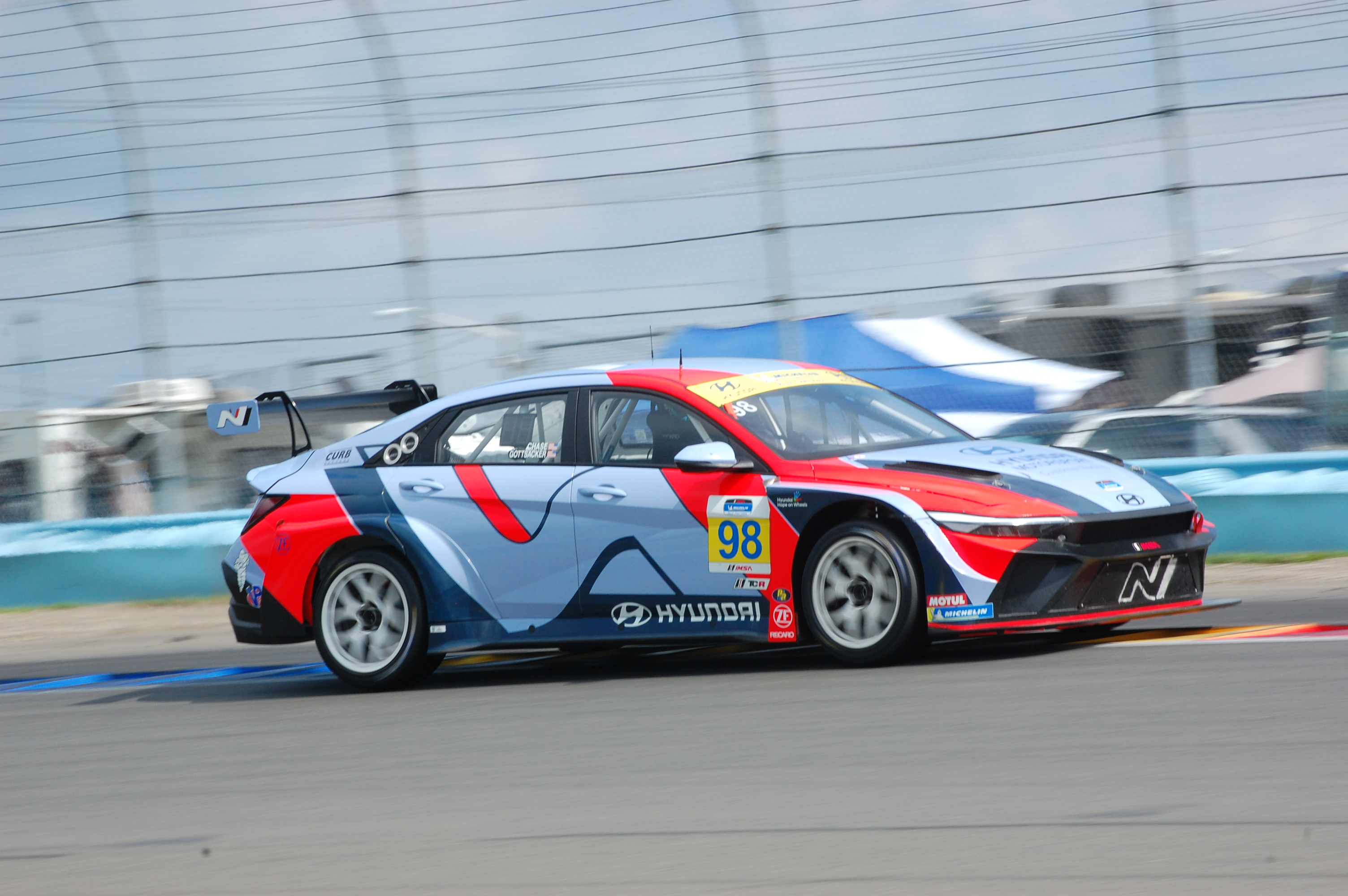
The No. 28 Rennsport1 won the GS Teams' and Drivers' Championship, with Porsche winning the GS Manufacturers' Championship.
The No. 98 Bryan Herta Autosport w/ Curb-Agajanian won the TCR Teams' Championship, with its driver Harry Gottsacker winning the TCR Drivers' Championship, and Hyundai winning the TCR Manufacturers' Championship.

== Classes ==
- Grand Sport (GS)
- Touring Car (TCR)

== Calendar ==
The provisional 2025 calendar was released on March 15, 2024, featuring ten rounds.

Round	Race	Circuit	Location	Date	Duration
1	BMW M Endurance Challenge at Daytona	(United States) Daytona International Speedway	Daytona Beach, Florida	January 23–24	4 Hours
2	Alan Jay Automotive Network 120	(United States) Sebring International Raceway	Sebring, Florida	March 12–14	2 Hours
3	WeatherTech Raceway Laguna Seca 120	(United States) WeatherTech Raceway Laguna Seca	Monterey, California	May 8–10	2 Hours
4	O'Reilly Auto Parts 4 Hours of Mid-Ohio	(United States) Mid-Ohio Sports Car Course	Lexington, Ohio	June 6–8	4 Hours
5	LP Building Solutions 120	(United States) Watkins Glen International	Watkins Glen, New York	June 19–22	2 Hours
6	Canadian Tire Motorsport Park 120	(Canada) Canadian Tire Motorsport Park	Bowmanville, Ontario	July 10–12	2 Hours
7	Road America 120	(United States) Road America	Elkhart Lake, Wisconsin	July 31 – August 2	2 Hours
8	Virginia Is For Racing Lovers Grand Prix	(United States) Virginia International Raceway	Alton, Virginia	August 21–23	2 Hours
9	Indianapolis Motor Speedway 120	(United States) Indianapolis Motor Speedway	Speedway, Indiana	September 19–20	2 Hours
10	Fox Factory 120	(United States) Michelin Raceway Road Atlanta	Braselton, Georgia	October 8–10	2 Hours

== Entry list ==
=== Grand Sport (GS) ===
Team	Car	Engine	No.	Drivers	Rounds
(United States) Czabok-Simpson Motorsport	Porsche 718 Cayman GT4 RS Clubsport	Porsche MDG 4.0 L Flat-6	2	(United States) Robert Megennis	2–8
(United States) Czabok-Simpson Motorsport	Porsche 718 Cayman GT4 RS Clubsport	Porsche MDG 4.0 L Flat-6	2	(Canada) Phil Fayer	2–5
(United States) Czabok-Simpson Motorsport	Porsche 718 Cayman GT4 RS Clubsport	Porsche MDG 4.0 L Flat-6	2	Nikita Lastochkin (Note: Lastochkin and Uretsky are Russian, but they compete as neutral competitors as Russian national emblems were banned by the FIA following the Russian invasion of Ukraine.)	6–8
(United States) Czabok-Simpson Motorsport	Porsche 718 Cayman GT4 RS Clubsport	Porsche MDG 4.0 L Flat-6	3	Nikita Lastochkin	3
(United States) Czabok-Simpson Motorsport	Porsche 718 Cayman GT4 RS Clubsport	Porsche MDG 4.0 L Flat-6	3	(United States) Chase Jones	3
(United States) Czabok-Simpson Motorsport	Porsche 718 Cayman GT4 RS Clubsport	Porsche MDG 4.0 L Flat-6	16	(United States) Zach Veach	4–8
(United States) Czabok-Simpson Motorsport	Porsche 718 Cayman GT4 RS Clubsport	Porsche MDG 4.0 L Flat-6	16	(Australia) Harrison Goodman	4, 6–8
(United States) Czabok-Simpson Motorsport	Porsche 718 Cayman GT4 RS Clubsport	Porsche MDG 4.0 L Flat-6	16	Nikita Lastochkin	5
(United States) Czabok-Simpson Motorsport	Porsche 718 Cayman GT4 RS Clubsport	Porsche MDG 4.0 L Flat-6	67	(United States) Morgan Burkhard	1–8
(United States) Czabok-Simpson Motorsport	Porsche 718 Cayman GT4 RS Clubsport	Porsche MDG 4.0 L Flat-6	67	(United States) Gordon Scully	1–8
(United States) Czabok-Simpson Motorsport	Porsche 718 Cayman GT4 RS Clubsport	Porsche MDG 4.0 L Flat-6	67	(United States) Robert Megennis	1
(United States) Czabok-Simpson Motorsport	Porsche 718 Cayman GT4 RS Clubsport	Porsche MDG 4.0 L Flat-6	67	Nikita Lastochkin	4
(United States) CarBahn with Peregrine Racing	BMW M4 GT4 Evo (G82)	BMW S58B30T0 3.0 L Twin-Turbo I6	4	(United States) Bill Cain	2, 5, 8
(United States) CarBahn with Peregrine Racing	BMW M4 GT4 Evo (G82)	BMW S58B30T0 3.0 L Twin-Turbo I6	4	(Canada) Aaron Povoledo	2, 5, 8
(United States) CarBahn with Peregrine Racing	BMW M4 GT4 Evo (G82)	BMW S58B30T0 3.0 L Twin-Turbo I6	4	(Australia) Cameron Shields	7
(United States) CarBahn with Peregrine Racing	BMW M4 GT4 Evo (G82)	BMW S58B30T0 3.0 L Twin-Turbo I6	4	(United States) Steve Wetterau	7
(United States) CarBahn with Peregrine Racing	BMW M4 GT4 Evo (G82)	BMW S58B30T0 3.0 L Twin-Turbo I6	39	(United States) Sean McAlister	1–8
(United States) CarBahn with Peregrine Racing	BMW M4 GT4 Evo (G82)	BMW S58B30T0 3.0 L Twin-Turbo I6	39	(United States) Jeff Westphal	1–8
(United States) 89x Motorsport	Aston Martin Vantage AMR GT4	Aston Martin M177 4.0 L Twin-Turbo V8	8	(United States) Mike Fitzpatrick	2
(United States) 89x Motorsport	Aston Martin Vantage AMR GT4	Aston Martin M177 4.0 L Twin-Turbo V8	8	(United States) Sebastian Vasan	2
(United States) RAFA Racing Team	Toyota GR Supra GT4 Evo2	BMW B58B30 3.0 L Twin-Turbo I6	12	(United States) Jim Jonsin	1–8
(United States) RAFA Racing Team	Toyota GR Supra GT4 Evo2	BMW B58B30 3.0 L Twin-Turbo I6	12	(El Salvador) Rafael Martinez	1–8
(United States) RAFA Racing Team	Toyota GR Supra GT4 Evo2	BMW B58B30 3.0 L Twin-Turbo I6	12	(United States) Kevin Conway	1, 4
(United States) RAFA Racing Team	Toyota GR Supra GT4 Evo2	BMW B58B30 3.0 L Twin-Turbo I6	12	(United States) Jim Scheffer	TBC
(United States) McCumbee McAleer Racing with Aerosport	Ford Mustang GT4 (2024)	Ford 5.0 L Coyote V8	13	(United States) Jenson Altzman	1–8
(United States) McCumbee McAleer Racing with Aerosport	Ford Mustang GT4 (2024)	Ford 5.0 L Coyote V8	13	(United States) Sam Paley	1–4
(United States) McCumbee McAleer Racing with Aerosport	Ford Mustang GT4 (2024)	Ford 5.0 L Coyote V8	13	(United States) Chad McCumbee	5
(United States) McCumbee McAleer Racing with Aerosport	Ford Mustang GT4 (2024)	Ford 5.0 L Coyote V8	13	(United States) Nate Cicero	6–8
(United States) AR Motorsports	Porsche 718 Cayman GT4 RS Clubsport	Porsche MDG 4.0 L Flat-6	14	(United States) David Hampton	3–4, 6–8
(United States) AR Motorsports	Porsche 718 Cayman GT4 RS Clubsport	Porsche MDG 4.0 L Flat-6	14	(United States) Thomas Merrill	3–4, 6–8
(United States) Van der Steur Racing	Aston Martin Vantage AMR GT4 Evo	Aston Martin M177 4.0 L Twin-Turbo V8	15	(United States) Christine Sloss	1–8
(United States) Van der Steur Racing	Aston Martin Vantage AMR GT4 Evo	Aston Martin M177 4.0 L Twin-Turbo V8	15	(United States) Ben Sloss	1, 3–5, 7
(United States) Van der Steur Racing	Aston Martin Vantage AMR GT4 Evo	Aston Martin M177 4.0 L Twin-Turbo V8	15	(United States) MHP Peters	2
(United States) Van der Steur Racing	Aston Martin Vantage AMR GT4 Evo	Aston Martin M177 4.0 L Twin-Turbo V8	15	(France) Clément Mateu	4
(United States) Van der Steur Racing	Aston Martin Vantage AMR GT4 Evo	Aston Martin M177 4.0 L Twin-Turbo V8	15	(United States) Glenn McGee	6, 8
(United States) Van der Steur Racing	Aston Martin Vantage AMR GT4 Evo	Aston Martin M177 4.0 L Twin-Turbo V8	15	(United States) Rory van der Steur	TBC
(United States) Van der Steur Racing	Aston Martin Vantage AMR GT4	Aston Martin M177 4.0 L Twin-Turbo V8	82	(United States) Brady Behrman	1
(United States) Van der Steur Racing	Aston Martin Vantage AMR GT4	Aston Martin M177 4.0 L Twin-Turbo V8	82	(United States) Sammy Smith	1
(Japan) TGR Team Hattori Motorsports	Toyota GR Supra GT4 Evo2	BMW B58B30 3.0 L Twin-Turbo I6	16	(Australia) Harrison Goodman	1–2
(Japan) TGR Team Hattori Motorsports	Toyota GR Supra GT4 Evo2	BMW B58B30 3.0 L Twin-Turbo I6	16	(United States) Zach Veach	1–2
(United States) Unitronic/JDC-Miller MotorSports	Porsche 718 Cayman GT4 RS Clubsport	Porsche MDG 4.0 L Flat-6	17	(United States) Chris Miller	1–7
(United States) Unitronic/JDC-Miller MotorSports	Porsche 718 Cayman GT4 RS Clubsport	Porsche MDG 4.0 L Flat-6	17	(South Africa) Mikey Taylor	1–2, 4–7
(United States) Unitronic/JDC-Miller MotorSports	Porsche 718 Cayman GT4 RS Clubsport	Porsche MDG 4.0 L Flat-6	17	(United States) Eric Filgueiras	3
(United States) Stephen Cameron Racing	Ford Mustang GT4 (2024)	Ford 5.0 L Coyote V8	19	(United States) Greg Liefooghe	1–7
(United States) Stephen Cameron Racing	Ford Mustang GT4 (2024)	Ford 5.0 L Coyote V8	19	(United States) Sean Quinlan	1–7
(United States) Auto Technic Racing	BMW M4 GT4 Evo (G82)	BMW S58B30T0 3.0 L Twin-Turbo I6	27	(United States) Austin Krainz	1–8
(United States) Auto Technic Racing	BMW M4 GT4 Evo (G82)	BMW S58B30T0 3.0 L Twin-Turbo I6	27	(United Kingdom) Stevan McAleer	1–8
(United States) Auto Technic Racing	BMW M4 GT4 Evo (G82)	BMW S58B30T0 3.0 L Twin-Turbo I6	27	(United States) Roland Krainz	1, 4
(United States) RennSport1	Porsche 718 Cayman GT4 RS Clubsport	Porsche MDG 4.0 L Flat-6	28	(Belgium) Jan Heylen	1–8
(United States) RennSport1	Porsche 718 Cayman GT4 RS Clubsport	Porsche MDG 4.0 L Flat-6	28	(United States) Luca Mars	1–8
(United States) LAP Motorsports	Ford Mustang GT4 (2024)	Ford 5.0 L Coyote V8	30	(United States) Scott Thomson	1–3, 7-8
(United States) LAP Motorsports	Ford Mustang GT4 (2024)	Ford 5.0 L Coyote V8	30	(United States) Clayton Williams	1–3, 7-8
(United States) BGB Motorsports	Porsche 718 Cayman GT4 RS Clubsport	Porsche MDG 4.0 L Flat-6	38	(Canada) Thomas Collingwood	1–2, 4
(United States) BGB Motorsports	Porsche 718 Cayman GT4 RS Clubsport	Porsche MDG 4.0 L Flat-6	38	(United States) Spencer Pumpelly	1–2, 4
(United States) BGB Motorsports	Porsche 718 Cayman GT4 RS Clubsport	Porsche MDG 4.0 L Flat-6	38	(United States) Andy Lally	1, 4
(United States) Accelerating Performance	McLaren Artura GT4	McLaren M630 3.0 L Twin-Turbo V6	44	(United States) Michael Cooper	1–8
(United States) Accelerating Performance	McLaren Artura GT4	McLaren M630 3.0 L Twin-Turbo V6	44	Moisey Uretsky	1–8
(United States) Team TGM	Aston Martin Vantage AMR GT4 Evo	Aston Martin M177 4.0 L Twin-Turbo V8	46	(United States) Paul Holton	1–8
(United States) Team TGM	Aston Martin Vantage AMR GT4 Evo	Aston Martin M177 4.0 L Twin-Turbo V8	46	(United States) Matt Plumb	1–8
(United States) Team TGM	Aston Martin Vantage AMR GT4 Evo	Aston Martin M177 4.0 L Twin-Turbo V8	64	(United States) Ted Giovanis	1–8
(United States) Team TGM	Aston Martin Vantage AMR GT4 Evo	Aston Martin M177 4.0 L Twin-Turbo V8	64	(United States) Hugh Plumb	1–8
(United States) Team TGM	Aston Martin Vantage AMR GT4 Evo	Aston Martin M177 4.0 L Twin-Turbo V8	64	(United States) Kris Wilson	1, 4
(United States) Team ACP - Tangerine Associates	BMW M4 GT4 (G82)	BMW S58B30T0 3.0 L Twin-Turbo I6	49	(United States) Nicholas Shanny	1
(United States) Team ACP - Tangerine Associates	BMW M4 GT4 (G82)	BMW S58B30T0 3.0 L Twin-Turbo I6	49	(United States) Steve Streimer	1
(United States) Team ACP - Tangerine Associates	BMW M4 GT4 (G82)	BMW S58B30T0 3.0 L Twin-Turbo I6	94	(United States) Ken Goldberg	1
(United States) Team ACP - Tangerine Associates	BMW M4 GT4 (G82)	BMW S58B30T0 3.0 L Twin-Turbo I6	94	(United States) Catesby Jones	1
(United States) Team ACP - Tangerine Associates	BMW M4 GT4 (G82)	BMW S58B30T0 3.0 L Twin-Turbo I6	94	(United States) Steven Thomas	1
(United States) Kingpin Racing	Toyota GR Supra GT4 Evo2	BMW B58B30 3.0 L Twin-Turbo I6	53	(United States) Satakal Khalsa	1, 3–4
(United States) Kingpin Racing	Toyota GR Supra GT4 Evo2	BMW B58B30 3.0 L Twin-Turbo I6	53	(United States) Rob Walker	1, 3–4
(United States) Kingpin Racing	Toyota GR Supra GT4 Evo2	BMW B58B30 3.0 L Twin-Turbo I6	53	(United States) David Hodge	1, 4
(United States) Kingpin Racing	Toyota GR Supra GT4 Evo2	BMW B58B30 3.0 L Twin-Turbo I6	53	(United States) Tyler Hoffman	TBC
(United States) Kingpin Racing	Toyota GR Supra GT4 Evo2	BMW B58B30 3.0 L Twin-Turbo I6	53	(United States) Patrick Wilmot	TBC
(Brazil) Panam Motorsport	Toyota GR Supra GT4 Evo 2–3; Toyota GR Supra GT4 Evo2 5, 7	BMW B58B30 3.0 L Twin-Turbo I6	54	(Brazil) Caio Chaves	2–3, 5, 7-8
(Brazil) Panam Motorsport	Toyota GR Supra GT4 Evo 2–3; Toyota GR Supra GT4 Evo2 5, 7	BMW B58B30 3.0 L Twin-Turbo I6	54	(Brazil) Werner Neugebauer	2, 5, 7-8
(Brazil) Panam Motorsport	Toyota GR Supra GT4 Evo 2–3; Toyota GR Supra GT4 Evo2 5, 7	BMW B58B30 3.0 L Twin-Turbo I6	54	(Brazil) Thiago Camilo	3
(United States) Winward Racing	Mercedes-AMG GT4	Mercedes-AMG M178 4.0 L Twin-Turbo V8	57	(United States) Bryce Ward	1–8
(United States) Winward Racing	Mercedes-AMG GT4	Mercedes-AMG M178 4.0 L Twin-Turbo V8	57	(Canada) Daniel Morad	1–6
(United States) Winward Racing	Mercedes-AMG GT4	Mercedes-AMG M178 4.0 L Twin-Turbo V8	57	(Switzerland) Philip Ellis	7
(United States) Winward Racing	Mercedes-AMG GT4	Mercedes-AMG M178 4.0 L Twin-Turbo V8	57	(Netherlands) "Daan Arrow"	8
(United States) KohR Motorsports	Ford Mustang GT4 (2024)	Ford 5.0 L Coyote V8	59	(United States) Billy Johnson	1–8
(United States) KohR Motorsports	Ford Mustang GT4 (2024)	Ford 5.0 L Coyote V8	59	(United States) Bob Michaelian	1–8
(United States) KohR Motorsports	Ford Mustang GT4 (2024)	Ford 5.0 L Coyote V8	60	(Germany) Christian Bach	1–2, 4
(United States) KohR Motorsports	Ford Mustang GT4 (2024)	Ford 5.0 L Coyote V8	60	(Canada) Marco Signoretti	1–2, 4
(United States) KohR Motorsports	Ford Mustang GT4 (2024)	Ford 5.0 L Coyote V8	60	(United States) Dean Martin	1, 4–5
(United States) KohR Motorsports	Ford Mustang GT4 (2024)	Ford 5.0 L Coyote V8	60	(United States) Bob Michaelian	5
(United States) KohR Motorsports	Ford Mustang GT4 (2024)	Ford 5.0 L Coyote V8	60	(United States) Sam Paley	8
(United States) KohR Motorsports	Ford Mustang GT4 (2024)	Ford 5.0 L Coyote V8	60	(United States) Nick Persing	8
(United States) CDR Valkyrie	Porsche 718 Cayman GT4 RS Clubsport	Porsche MDG 4.0 L Flat-6	66	(United States) Brian Lock	1, 3
(United States) CDR Valkyrie	Porsche 718 Cayman GT4 RS Clubsport	Porsche MDG 4.0 L Flat-6	66	(United Kingdom) Amir Haleem	1
(United States) CDR Valkyrie	Porsche 718 Cayman GT4 RS Clubsport	Porsche MDG 4.0 L Flat-6	66	(Australia) Matthew Brabham	3
(United States) Rebel Rock Racing	Aston Martin Vantage AMR GT4 Evo	Aston Martin M177 4.0 L Twin-Turbo V8	71	(United States) Frank DePew	1–8
(United States) Rebel Rock Racing	Aston Martin Vantage AMR GT4 Evo	Aston Martin M177 4.0 L Twin-Turbo V8	71	(United Kingdom) Robin Liddell	1–8
(United States) Rebel Rock Racing	Aston Martin Vantage AMR GT4 Evo	Aston Martin M177 4.0 L Twin-Turbo V8	71	(United States) Andrew Davis	1, 4
(United States) Turner Motorsport	BMW M4 GT4 Evo (G82)	BMW S58B30T0 3.0 L Twin-Turbo I6	95	(United States) Dillon Machavern	1–8
(United States) Turner Motorsport	BMW M4 GT4 Evo (G82)	BMW S58B30T0 3.0 L Twin-Turbo I6	95	(United States) Francis Selldorff	1–8
(United States) Turner Motorsport	BMW M4 GT4 Evo (G82)	BMW S58B30T0 3.0 L Twin-Turbo I6	96	(United States) Vin Barletta	1–4, 6
(United States) Turner Motorsport	BMW M4 GT4 Evo (G82)	BMW S58B30T0 3.0 L Twin-Turbo I6	96	(United States) Matt Dalton	1, 4–5, 7
(United States) Turner Motorsport	BMW M4 GT4 Evo (G82)	BMW S58B30T0 3.0 L Twin-Turbo I6	96	(United States) Patrick Gallagher	1, 4–5, 7
(United States) Turner Motorsport	BMW M4 GT4 Evo (G82)	BMW S58B30T0 3.0 L Twin-Turbo I6	96	(United States) Robby Foley	2–3, 6

=== Touring Car (TCR) ===
Team	Car	No.	Drivers	Rounds
(United States) KMW Motorsports with TMR Engineering	Honda Civic Type R TCR (FL5)	5	(United States) Tim Lewis Jr.	1–8
(United States) KMW Motorsports with TMR Engineering	Honda Civic Type R TCR (FL5)	5	(United States) William Tally	1–8
(United States) Precision Racing LA	Audi RS 3 LMS TCR (2021)	7	(United States) Ryan Eversley	1–8
(United States) Precision Racing LA	Audi RS 3 LMS TCR (2021)	7	(Brazil) Celso Neto	1–8
(United States) Precision Racing LA	Audi RS 3 LMS TCR (2021)	37	(Canada) Megan Tomlinson	1–8
(United States) Precision Racing LA	Audi RS 3 LMS TCR (2021)	37	(Canada) Ron Tomlinson	1–8
(United States) Bryan Herta Autosport with Curb-Agajanian	Hyundai Elantra N TCR (2024)	9	(Brazil) Suellio Almeida	1–8
(United States) Bryan Herta Autosport with Curb-Agajanian	Hyundai Elantra N TCR (2024)	9	(United States) Madison Aust	1–8
(United States) Bryan Herta Autosport with Curb-Agajanian	Hyundai Elantra N TCR (2024)	33	(Canada) Mark Wilkins	1–8
(United States) Bryan Herta Autosport with Curb-Agajanian	Hyundai Elantra N TCR (2024)	33	(United States) Bryson Morris	1–4, 6–8
(United States) Bryan Herta Autosport with Curb-Agajanian	Hyundai Elantra N TCR (2024)	33	(United States) Taylor Hagler	5
(United States) Bryan Herta Autosport with Curb-Agajanian	Hyundai Elantra N TCR (2024)	76	(United States) Preston Brown	1–8
(United States) Bryan Herta Autosport with Curb-Agajanian	Hyundai Elantra N TCR (2024)	76	(Belgium) Denis Dupont	1–8
(United States) Bryan Herta Autosport with Curb-Agajanian	Hyundai Elantra N TCR (2024)	98	(United States) Harry Gottsacker	1–8
(United States) Bryan Herta Autosport with Curb-Agajanian	Hyundai Elantra N TCR (2024)	98	(United States) Mason Filippi	1–4, 6–8
(United States) Bryan Herta Autosport with Curb-Agajanian	Hyundai Elantra N TCR (2024)	98	(United States) Parker Chase	5
(United States) Bryan Herta Autosport with Curb-Agajanian	Hyundai Elantra N TCR	18	(United States) Lance Bergstein	7-8
(United States) Bryan Herta Autosport with Curb-Agajanian	Hyundai Elantra N TCR	18	(United States) Jon Miller	7-8
(United States) Rockwell Autosport Development	Audi RS 3 LMS TCR (2021)	10	(United States) Eric Rockwell	1, 3–6
(United States) Rockwell Autosport Development	Audi RS 3 LMS TCR (2021)	10	(United States) Christina Lam	1, 4–5
(United States) Rockwell Autosport Development	Audi RS 3 LMS TCR (2021)	10	(United States) Alex Rockwell	1, 7-8
(United States) Rockwell Autosport Development	Audi RS 3 LMS TCR (2021)	10	(United States) Bruno Colombo	3–4, 6–8
(Puerto Rico) Victor Gonzalez Racing Team	Hyundai Elantra N TCR	18	(United States) Lance Bergstein	1–6,8
(Puerto Rico) Victor Gonzalez Racing Team	Hyundai Elantra N TCR	18	(United States) Jon Miller	1–6,8
(Puerto Rico) Victor Gonzalez Racing Team	Hyundai Elantra N TCR	99	(Spain) Tyler Gonzalez (Note: Gonzalez is an American-Spanish driver competing under a Spanish licence.)	1–6
(Puerto Rico) Victor Gonzalez Racing Team	Hyundai Elantra N TCR	99	(United States) Eric Powell	1–6
(Puerto Rico) Victor Gonzalez Racing Team	Cupra León VZ TCR	99	(Spain) Tyler Gonzalez	7-8
(Puerto Rico) Victor Gonzalez Racing Team	Cupra León VZ TCR	99	(United States) Eric Powell	7-8
(United States) RVA Graphics Motorsports by Speed Syndicate	Audi RS 3 LMS TCR (2021)	31	(United States) Luke Rumburg	1–5, 7-8
(United States) RVA Graphics Motorsports by Speed Syndicate	Audi RS 3 LMS TCR (2021)	31	(United States) Johnny Mauro	1–2
(United States) RVA Graphics Motorsports by Speed Syndicate	Audi RS 3 LMS TCR (2021)	31	(United States) Alex Garcia	1
(United States) RVA Graphics Motorsports by Speed Syndicate	Audi RS 3 LMS TCR (2021)	31	(United States) Nick Galante	3
(United States) RVA Graphics Motorsports by Speed Syndicate	Audi RS 3 LMS TCR (2021)	31	(United States) Jaden Conwright	4–5, 7-8
(Canada) Baker Racing	Audi RS 3 LMS TCR (2021)	52	(Canada) James Vance	1–6, 8
(Canada) Baker Racing	Audi RS 3 LMS TCR (2021)	52	(Canada) Sam Baker	1–2, 4–6, 8
(Canada) Baker Racing	Audi RS 3 LMS TCR (2021)	52	(Canada) Dean Baker	1, 3
(Canada) Baker Racing	Audi RS 3 LMS TCR (2021)	56	(Canada) Dean Baker	5–6, 8
(Canada) Baker Racing	Audi RS 3 LMS TCR (2021)	56	(Brazil) Bruno Junqueira	5–6, 8
(United States) Gou Racing	Cupra León VZ TCR	55	(United States) Eddie Gou	1–3, 5, 7-8
(United States) Gou Racing	Cupra León VZ TCR	55	(United States) Eduardo Gou	1–3, 5, 7-8
(United States) Road Shagger Racing	Audi RS 3 LMS TCR (2021)	61	(United States) Gavin Ernstone	3
(United States) Road Shagger Racing	Audi RS 3 LMS TCR (2021)	61	(United States) Jon Morley	3
(United States) Pegram Racing	Hyundai Elantra N TCR	72	(United States) Larry Pegram	1–8
(United States) Pegram Racing	Hyundai Elantra N TCR	72	(United States) Riley Pegram	1–8
(United States) HART	Honda Civic Type R TCR (FL5)	89	(United States) Tyler Chambers	1–2, 4–5, 7
(United States) HART	Honda Civic Type R TCR (FL5)	89	(United States) Chad Gilsinger	1–2, 4–5, 7
(United States) HART	Honda Civic Type R TCR (FL5)	89	(United States) Steve Eich	1
(United States) HART	Honda Civic Type R TCR (FL5)	89	(United States) Cameron Lawrence	4
(Canada) Montreal Motorsport Group	Honda Civic Type R TCR (FL5)	93	(Canada) Louis-Philippe Montour	1–8
(Canada) Montreal Motorsport Group	Honda Civic Type R TCR (FL5)	93	(Canada) Karl Wittmer	1–8
(Canada) Montreal Motorsport Group	Honda Civic Type R TCR (FL5)	93	(Japan) Daijiro Yoshihara	1, 4

== Race results ==
Bold indicates overall winner.

Round	Circuit	GS Winning Car	TCR Winning Car
Round	Circuit	GS Winning Drivers	TCR Winning Drivers
1	Daytona	**(United States) #44 Accelerating Performance**	(United States) #76 Bryan Herta Autosport with Curb-Agajanian
1	Daytona	**(United States) Michael Cooper**; **Moisey Uretsky**	(United States) Preston Brown (Belgium) Denis Dupont
2	Sebring	**(United States) #39 CarBahn with Peregrine Racing**	(United States) #98 Bryan Herta Autosport with Curb-Agajanian
2	Sebring	**(United States) Sean McAlister** **(United States) Jeff Westphal**	(United States) Mason Filippi (United States) Harry Gottsacker
3	Laguna Seca	**(United States) #28 RennSport1**	(United States) #76 Bryan Herta Autosport with Curb-Agajanian
3	Laguna Seca	**(Belgium) Jan Heylen** **(United States) Luca Mars**	(United States) Preston Brown (Belgium) Denis Dupont
4	Mid-Ohio	**(United States) #95 Turner Motorsport**	(United States) #98 Bryan Herta Autosport with Curb-Agajanian
4	Mid-Ohio	**(United States) Dillon Machavern** **(United States) Francis Selldorff**	(United States) Mason Filippi (United States) Harry Gottsacker
5	Watkins Glen	**(United States) #28 RennSport1**	(Canada) #93 Montreal Motorsport Group
5	Watkins Glen	**(Belgium) Jan Heylen** **(United States) Luca Mars**	(Canada) Louis-Philippe Montour (Canada) Karl Wittmer
6	Mosport	**(United States) #39 CarBahn with Peregrine Racing**	(Canada) #93 Montreal Motorsport Group
6	Mosport	**(United States) Sean McAlister** **(United States) Jeff Westphal**	(Canada) Louis-Philippe Montour (Canada) Karl Wittmer
7	Road America	**(United States) #13 McCumbee McAleer Racing with Aerosport**	(United States) #33 Bryan Herta Autosport with Curb-Agajanian
7	Road America	**(United States) Jenson Altzman** **(United States) Nate Cicero**	(United States) Bryson Morris (Canada) Mark Wilkins
8	Virginia	**(United States) #28 RennSport1**	(United States) #31 RVA Graphics Motorsports by Speed Syndicate
8	Virginia	**(Belgium) Jan Heylen** **(United States) Luca Mars**	(United States) Jaden Conwright (United States) Luke Rumburg
9	Indianapolis	**(United States) #44 Accelerating Performance**	(Puerto Rico) #99 Victor Gonzalez Racing Team
9	Indianapolis	**(United States) Michael Cooper**; **Moisey Uretsky**	(United States) Tyler Gonzalez (United States) Eric Powell
10	Road Atlanta	**(United States) #44 Accelerating Performance**	(Puerto Rico) #99 Victor Gonzalez Racing Team
10	Road Atlanta	**(United States) Michael Cooper**; **Moisey Uretsky**	(United States) Tyler Gonzalez (United States) Eric Powell

== Championship standings ==
=== Points system ===
Championship points are awarded in each class at the finish of each event. Points are awarded based on finishing positions in the race as shown in the chart below.

Position	1	2	3	4	5	6	7	8	9	10	11	12	13	14	15	16	17	18	19	20	21	22	23	24	25	26	27	28	29	30+
Race	350	320	300	280	260	250	240	230	220	210	200	190	180	170	160	150	140	130	120	110	100	90	80	70	60	50	40	30	20	10

=== Drivers' Championships ===
==== Standings: Grand Sport (GS) ====
Pos.	Drivers	DAY	SEB	LGA	MOH	WGL	MOS	ELK	VIR	IMS	ATL	Points	BDC
1	(Belgium) Jan Heylen (United States) Luca Mars	**2**	2	1	3	1	9	17	1	**19**	6	2720	-
2	(United States) Sean McAlister (United States) Jeff Westphal	12	1	**4**	18	3	1	4	8	5	4	2650	-
3	(United States) Austin Krainz (United Kingdom) Stevan McAleer	15	4	5	5	6	2	3	12	6	10	2470	-
4	(United States) Jenson Altzman	4	5	11	7	**2**	**5**	**1**	**11**	7	20	2460	-
5	(United States) Michael Cooper; Moisey Uretsky	1	7	22	4	18	6	22	10	1	**1**	2340	-
6	(United States) Dillon Machavern (United States) Francis Selldorff	11	3	9	1	13	18	21	4	10	14	2140	-
7	(United States) Billy Johnson (United States) Bob Michaelian	3	14	21	6	4	11	14	3	8	16	2140	-
8	(United States) Paul Holton (United States) Matt Plumb	23	**6**	8	11	5	10	8	6	11	9	2130	-
9	(United States) Greg Liefooghe (United States) Sean Quinlan	8	10	10	9	19	3	19	5	15	13	2010	-
10	(United States) Frank DePew (United Kingdom) Robin Liddell	22	8	2	8	7	19	18	9	4	17	2000	-
11	(United States) Bryce Ward	6	21	13	2	21	7	16	22	8	8	1880	-
12	(United States) Chris Miller	7	24	14	10	10	8	7			12	1560	-
13	(United States) Morgan Burkhard (United States) Gordon Scully	14	16	20	15	9	14	20	22	23	7	1500	-
14	(United States) Robert Megennis	14	18	24	14	12	13	9	24	21	18	1430	-
15	(United States) Ted Giovanis (United States) Hugh Plumb	19	20	16	17	16	16	11	15	17	21	1420	3330
16	(South Africa) Mikey Taylor	7	24		10	10	8	7			12	1390	-
17	(United States) Sam Paley	4	5	11	7				2		27	1340	-
18	(United States) Vin Barletta	13	13	7	16		4		7			1270	-
19	(United States) Christine Sloss	18	22	17	21	14	15	13	20	18	25	1270	3140
20	(United States) Robby Foley		13	7			4		7		3	1240	-
21	(United States) Zach Veach	10	11		12	15	DNS	15	18	DNS	15	1210	-
22	(Canada) Daniel Morad	6	21	13	2	21	7					1190	-
23	(United States) Jim Jonsin (El Salvador) Rafael Martinez	27	23	15	22	17	17	12	17	20	22	1180	3020
24	(United States) Nate Cicero						**5**	**1**	**11**	7	20	1160	-
25	(United States) David Hampton (United States) Thomas Merrill			18	**19**		12	6	16	12	19	1150	-
26	(Australia) Harrison Goodman	10	11		12		DNS	15	18	DNS	15	1050	-
27	(United States) Scott Thomson (United States) Clayton Williams	9	19	19				10	19	16	23	1020	-
28	(United States) Patrick Gallagher	13			16	8		5		14		990	-
29	(Brazil) Caio Chaves		15	3		11		DNS	13	22	26	980	-
30	Nikita Lastochkin			12	15	15	13	9	24			980	-
31	(United States) Matt Dalton	13			16	8		5				820	-
32	(Canada) Phil Fayer		18	24	14	12				21	18	790	-
33	(United States) Ben Sloss	18		17	21	14		13			25	780	1850
34	(Brazil) Werner Neugebauer		15			11		DNS	13	22	26	680	-
35	(United States) Jaxon Bell (United States) Ford Koch								14	13	2	670	-
36	(Australia) Cameron Shields							2			5	580	-
37	(Canada) Thomas Collingwood (United States) Spencer Pumpelly	5	12		20							560	-
38	(Netherlands) "Daan Arrow"								23	8	8	540	-
39	(United States) Bill Cain (Canada) Aaron Povoledo		9			20			21	24		500	-
40	(United States) Roland Krainz	15			5							420	-
41	(United States) Satakal Khalsa (United States) Rob Walker	16		23	13							410	980
42	(United States) Glenn McGee						15		15	17		400	970
43	(United States) Andy Lally	5			20							370	-
44	(United States) Nick Persing								2		27	360	-
45	(United States) David Hodge	16			13							330	700
46	(United States) Chad McCumbee					2						320	-
47	(United States) Steve Wetterau							2				320	-
48	(United States) Alexandra Hainer (Canada) Jesse Lazare									2		320	-
49	(United States) Brian Lock	24		6								320	250
50	(United States) Andrew Davis	22			8							320	-
51	(Brazil) Thiago Camilo			3								300	-
52	(Australia) Cameron McLeod (United States) Robert Noaker									3		300	-
53	(United States) Beltre Curtis										3	300	-
54	(United States) Nolan Siegel										5	260	-
55	(United States) Kris Wilson	19			17							260	620
56	(Australia) Matthew Brabham			6								250	-
57	(United States) Tyler Hoffman (United States) Patrick Wilmot										10	220	-
58	(United States) Chase Jones			12								190	-
59	(Germany) Christian Bach (Canada) Marco Signoretti	26	17		DNS							190	-
60	(United States) Eric Filgueiras			14								170	-
61	(United States) Jake Walker									14		170	-
62	(Switzerland) Philip Ellis							16				150	-
63	(United States) Brady Behrman (United States) Sammy Smith	17										140	-
64	(United States) Kevin Conway	27			22							130	510
65	(United States) Mike Fitzpatrick		25								24	130	300
66	(United States) Nicholas Shanny (United States) Steve Streimer	20										110	280
67	(United States) Ken Goldburg (United States) Catesby Jones (United States) Steven Thomas	21										100	260
68	(France) Clément Mateu				21							100	300
69	(United States) MHP Peters		22									90	320
70	(United Kingdom) Amir Haleem	24										70	250
71	(United States) Johan Schwartz										24	70	300
72	(United States) Slade Stewart (United States) Tom Tait	25										60	240
73	(United States) Sebastian Vasan		25									60	-
74	(United States) Dean Martin	26			DNS	DNS						50	-
Pos.	Drivers	DAY	SEB	LGA	MOH	WGL	MOS	ELK	VIR	IMS	ATL	Points	BDC

Colour	Result
Gold	Winner
Silver	Second place
Bronze	Third place
Green	Points classification
Blue	Non-points classification
Blue	Non-classified finish (NC)
Purple	Retired, not classified (Ret)
Red	Did not qualify (DNQ)
Red	Did not pre-qualify (DNPQ)
Black	Disqualified (DSQ)
White	Did not start (DNS)
White	Withdrew (WD)
White	Race cancelled (C)
Blank	Did not practice (DNP)
Blank	Did not arrive (DNA)
Blank	Excluded (EX)

**Bold** - Pole position

Italics - Fastest lap

==== Standings: Touring Car (TCR) ====
Pos.	Drivers	DAY	SEB	LGA	MOH	WGL	MOS	ELK	VIR	IMS	ATL	Points
1	(United States) Harry Gottsacker	8	1	2	1	3	8	4	11	4	**4**	2820
2	(United States) Preston Brown (Belgium) Denis Dupont	1	7	1	2	5	5	5	7	12	2	2800
3	(Canada) Louis-Philippe Montour (Canada) Karl Wittmer	12	2	15	**3**	**1**	1	**3**	4	3	15	2710
4	(United States) Ryan Eversley (Brazil) Celso Neto	3	8	8	10	7	3	6	5	2	5	2550
5	(United States) Tyler Gonzalez (United States) Eric Powell	11	6	12	8	2	2	14	15	**1**	1	2540
6	(United States) Mason Filippi	8	1	2	1		8	4	11	4	**4**	2520
7	(Canada) Mark Wilkins	**2**	**15**	**3**	4	10	**13**	1	**2**	15	14	2450
8	(Brazil) Suellio Almeida (United States) Madison Aust	4	12	5	6	8	7	8	8	12	5	2360
9	(United States) Bryson Morris	**2**	**15**	**3**	4		**13**	1	**2**	15	14	1590
10	(United States) Tim Lewis Jr. (United States) William Tally	16	4	14	12	6	10	9	9	5	6	2200
11	(Canada) Megan Tomlinson (Canada) Ron Tomlinson	7	10	9	7	9	9	12	12	8	12	2150
12	(Canada) James Vance	9	5	4	9	13	12		16	7	3	2040
13	(United States) Larry Pegram (United States) Riley Pegram	13	9	10	11	14	11	10	10	13	16	1930
14	(United States) Lance Bergstein (United States) Jon Miller	6	14	13	5	11	DNS	11	6	16	11	1860
15	(United States) Luke Rumburg	15	13	11	13	12		2	1		8	1810
16	(United States) Eddie Gou (United States) Eduardo Gou	14	11	6		17		7	3	6	7	1790
17	(Canada) Sam Baker	9	5		9	13	12		16	7	3	1760
18	(Canada) Dean Baker	9		4		15	4		14	14	9	1500
19	(United States) Tyler Chambers (United States) Chad Gilsinger	5	3		15	4		13		9		1400
20	(United States) Eric Rockwell	10		16	14	16	6			10	13	1320
21	(United States) Jaden Conwright				13	12		2	1		8	1270
22	(Brazil) Bruno Junqueira					15	4		14	14	9	1000
23	(United States) Christina Lam	10			14	16				10	13	920
24	(United States) Bruno Colombo			16	14		6	WD	13			750
25	(Japan) Daijiro Yoshihara	12			**3**							490
26	(United States) Alex Rockwell	10						WD	13			390
27	(United States) Johnny Mauro	15	13									340
28	(United States) Parker Chase					3						300
29	(United States) Steve Eich	5										260
30	(United States) Gavin Ernstone (United States) Jon Morley			7								240
31	(United States) Taylor Hagler					10						210
32	(United States) Nick Galante			11								200
33	(United States) Alex Garcia	15										160
34	(United States) Cameron Lawrence				15							160
Pos.	Drivers	DAY	SEB	LGA	MOH	WGL	MOS	ELK	VIR	IMS	ATL	Points

Colour	Result
Gold	Winner
Silver	Second place
Bronze	Third place
Green	Points classification
Blue	Non-points classification
Blue	Non-classified finish (NC)
Purple	Retired, not classified (Ret)
Red	Did not qualify (DNQ)
Red	Did not pre-qualify (DNPQ)
Black	Disqualified (DSQ)
White	Did not start (DNS)
White	Withdrew (WD)
White	Race cancelled (C)
Blank	Did not practice (DNP)
Blank	Did not arrive (DNA)
Blank	Excluded (EX)

**Bold** - Pole position

Italics - Fastest lap

=== Teams' Championships ===
==== Standings: Grand Sport (GS) ====
Pos.	Team	Car	DAY	SEB	LGA	MOH	WGL	MOS	ELK	VIR	IMS	ATL	Points
1	#28 RennSport1	Porsche 718 Cayman GT4 RS Clubsport	**2**	2	1	3	1	9	17	1	**19**	6	2720
2	#39 CarBahn with Peregrine Racing	BMW M4 GT4 (G82)	12	1	**4**	18	3	1	4	8	5	4	2650
3	#27 Auto Technic Racing	BMW M4 GT4 (G82)	15	4	5	5	6	2	3	12	6	11	2470
4	#13 McCumbee McAleer Racing w/ Aerosport	Ford Mustang GT4 (2024)	4	5	11	7	**2**	**5**	**1**	**11**	7	20	2460
5	#44 Accelerating Performance #44 Ibiza Farm Motorsports	McLaren Artura GT4	1	7	22	4	18	6	22	10	1	**1**	2340
6	#96 Turner Motorsport	BMW M4 GT4 (G82)	13	13	7	16	8	4	5	7	14	3	2230
7	#95 Turner Motorsport	BMW M4 GT4 (G82)	11	3	9	1	13	18	21	4	10	14	2140
8	#59 KohR Motorsport	Ford Mustang GT4 (2024)	3	14	21	6	4	11	14	3	9	16	2140
9	#46 Team TGM	Aston Martin Vantage AMR GT4 Evo	23	**6**	8	11	5	10	8	6	11	9	2130
10	#19 Stephen Cameron Racing	Ford Mustang GT4 (2024)	8	10	10	9	19	3	19	5	15	13	2010
11	#71 Rebel Rock Racing	Aston Martin Vantage AMR GT4 Evo	22	8	2	8	7	19	18	9	4	17	2000
12	#57 Winward Racing	Mercedes-AMG GT4	6	21	13	2	21	7	16	22	8	8	1880
13	#17 Unitronic/JDC-Miller MotorSports	Porsche 718 Cayman GT4 RS Clubsport	7	24	14	10	10	8	7			12	1560
14	#67 Czabok-Simpson Motorsport	Porsche 718 Cayman GT4 RS Clubsport	14	16	20	15	9	14	20	22	23	7	1500
15	#64 Team TGM	Aston Martin Vantage AMR GT4 Evo	19	20	16	17	16	16	11	15	17	21	1420
16	#15 Van der Steur Racing	Aston Martin Vantage AMR GT4 Evo	18	22	17	21	14	15	13	20	18	25	1270
17	#2 Czabok-Simpson Motorsport	Porsche 718 Cayman GT4 RS Clubsport		18	24	14	12	13	9	24	21	18	1260
18	#16 TGR Team Hattori Motorsports #16 Czabok-Simpson Motorsport	Toyota GR Supra GT4 Evo2; Porsche 718 Cayman GT4 RS Clubsport	10	11		12	15	DNS	15	18	DNS	15	1210
19	#12 RAFA Racing Team	Toyota GR Supra GT4 Evo2	27	23	15	22	17	17	12	17	20	22	1180
20	#14 AR Motorsports	Porsche 718 Cayman GT4 RS Clubsport			18	**19**		12	6	16	12	19	1150
21	#4 CarBahn	BMW M4 GT4 (G82)		9			20		2	21	24	5	1080
22	#30 LAP Motorsports	Ford Mustang GT4 (2024)	9	19	19				10	19	16	23	1020
23	#54 Panam Motorsport	Toyota GR Supra GT4 Evo1; Toyota GR Supra GT4 Evo2		15	3		11		DNS	13	22	26	980
24	#60 KohR Motorsports	Ford Mustang GT4 (2024)	26	17		DNS	DNS			2	3	27	850
25	#23 Copeland Motorsports	Toyota GR Supra GT4 Evo2								14	13	2	670
26	#53 Kingpin Racing	Toyota GR Supra GT4 Evo2	16		23	13						10	620
27	#38 BGB Motorsports	Porsche 718 Cayman GT4 RS Clubsport	5	12		20							560
28	#21 Motorsports In Action	McLaren Artura GT4									2		320
29	#66 CDR Valkyrie	Porsche 718 Cayman GT4 RS Clubsport	24		6								320
30	#3 Czabok-Simpson Motorsport	Porsche 718 Cayman GT4 RS Clubsport			12								190
31	#82 Van der Steur Racing	Aston Martin Vantage AMR GT4	17										140
32	#8 89x Motorsports	Aston Martin Vantage AMR GT4		25								24	130
33	#49 Team ACP - Tangerine Associates	BMW M4 GT4 (G82)	20										110
34	#94 Team ACP - Tangerine Associates	BMW M4 GT4 (G82)	21										100
35	#43 MDK Motorsports	Porsche 718 Cayman GT4 RS Clubsport	25										60
Pos.	Team	Car	DAY	SEB	LGA	MOH	WGL	MOS	ELK	VIR	IMS	ATL	Points

==== Standings: Touring Car (TCR) ====
Pos.	Team	Car	DAY	SEB	LGA	MOH	WGL	MOS	ELK	VIR	IMS	ATL	Points
1	#98 Bryan Herta Autosport w/ Curb-Agajanian	Hyundai Elantra N TCR (2024)	8	1	2	1	3	8	4	11	4	**4**	2820
2	#76 Bryan Herta Autosport w/ Curb-Agajanian	Hyundai Elantra N TCR (2024)	1	7	1	2	5	5	5	7	12	2	2800
3	#93 Montreal Motorsport Group	Honda Civic Type R TCR (FL5)	12	2	15	**3**	**1**	1	**3**	4	3	15	2710
4	#7 Precision Racing LA	Audi RS 3 LMS TCR (2021)	3	8	8	10	7	3	6	5	2	5	2550
5	#99 Victor Gonzalez Racing Team	Hyundai Elantra N TCR; Cupra León VZ TCR	11	6	12	8	2	2	14	15	**1**	1	2540
6	#33 Bryan Herta Autosport w/ Curb-Agajanian	Hyundai Elantra N TCR (2024)	**2**	**15**	**3**	4	10	**13**	1	**2**	15	14	2450
7	#9 Bryan Herta Autosport w/ Curb-Agajanian	Hyundai Elantra N TCR (2024)	4	12	5	6	8	7	8	8	12	5	2360
8	#5 KMW Motorsport w/ TMR Engineering	Honda Civic Type R TCR (FL5)	16	4	14	12	6	10	9	9	5	6	2200
9	#37 Precision Racing LA	Audi RS 3 LMS TCR (2021)	7	10	9	7	9	9	12	12	8	12	2150
10	#52 Baker Racing	Audi RS 3 LMS TCR (2021)	9	5	4	9	13	12		16	7	3	2040
11	#72 Pegram Racing	Hyundai Elantra N TCR	13	9	10	11	14	11	10	10	13	16	1930
12	#18 Victoria Gonzalez Racing Team #18 Bryan Herta Autosport w/ Curb-Agajanian	Hyundai Elantra N TCR	6	14	13	5	11	DNS	11	6	16	11	1860
13	#31 RVA Graphics Motorsport by Speed Syndicate	Audi RS 3 LMS TCR (2021)	15	13	11	13	12		2	1		8	1810
14	#55 Gou Racing	Cupra León VZ TCR	14	11	6		17		7	3	6	7	1790
15	#10 Rockwell Autosport Development	Audi RS 3 LMS TCR (2021)	10		16	14	16	6	WD	13	10	13	1500
16	#89 HART	Honda Civic Type R TCR (FL5)	5	3		15	4		13		9		1400
17	#56 Baker Racing	Audi RS 3 LMS TCR (2021)					15	4		14	14	9	1000
18	#61 Road Shagger Racing	Audi RS 3 LMS TCR (2021)			7								240
Pos.	Team	Car	DAY	SEB	LGA	MOH	WGL	MOS	ELK	VIR	IMS	ATL	Points

=== Manufacturers' Championships ===
==== Standings: Grand Sport (GS) ====
Pos.	Manufacturer	DAY	SEB	LGA	MOH	WGL	MOS	ELK	VIR	IMS	ATL	Points
1	(Germany) Porsche	**2**	2	1	**3**	1	8	6	1	**12**	6	3080
2	(Germany) BMW	11	1	**4**	1	3	1	2	4	5	3	3080
3	(United States) Ford	3	5	10	6	**2**	**3**	**1**	**2**	3	13	2990
4	(United Kingdom) McLaren	1	7	22	4	18	6	22	10	1	**1**	2880
5	(United Kingdom) Aston Martin	17	**6**	2	8	4	10	8	6	4	9	2730
6	(Japan) Toyota	10	11	3	13	10	17	12	13	13	2	2620
7	(Germany) Mercedes-AMG	6	21	13	2	21	7	16	22	8	8	2620
Pos.	Manufacturer	DAY	SEB	LGA	MOH	WGL	MOS	ELK	VIR	IMS	ATL	Points

==== Standings: Touring Car (TCR) ====
Pos.	Manufacturer	DAY	SEB	LGA	MOH	WGL	MOS	ELK	VIR	IMS	ATL	Points
1	(South Korea) Hyundai	**1**	**1**	**1**	1	2	**2**	1	**2**	4	**2**	3310
2	(Germany) Audi	3	5	4	7	7	3	2	1	2	3	3130
3	(Japan) Honda	5	2	14	**3**	**1**	1	**3**	4	3	6	3080
4	(Spain) Cupra	13	11	6		17		7	3	**1**	1	2420
Pos.	Manufacturer	DAY	SEB	LGA	MOH	WGL	MOS	ELK	VIR	IMS	ATL	Points
