= 2024 Prototype Cup Germany =

Series of car races

The 2024 Prototype Cup Germany is the third season of the Prototype Cup Germany. Organised and promoted by Creventic and German automobile club ADAC, the series will be contested with Le Mans Prototype and Group CN cars.

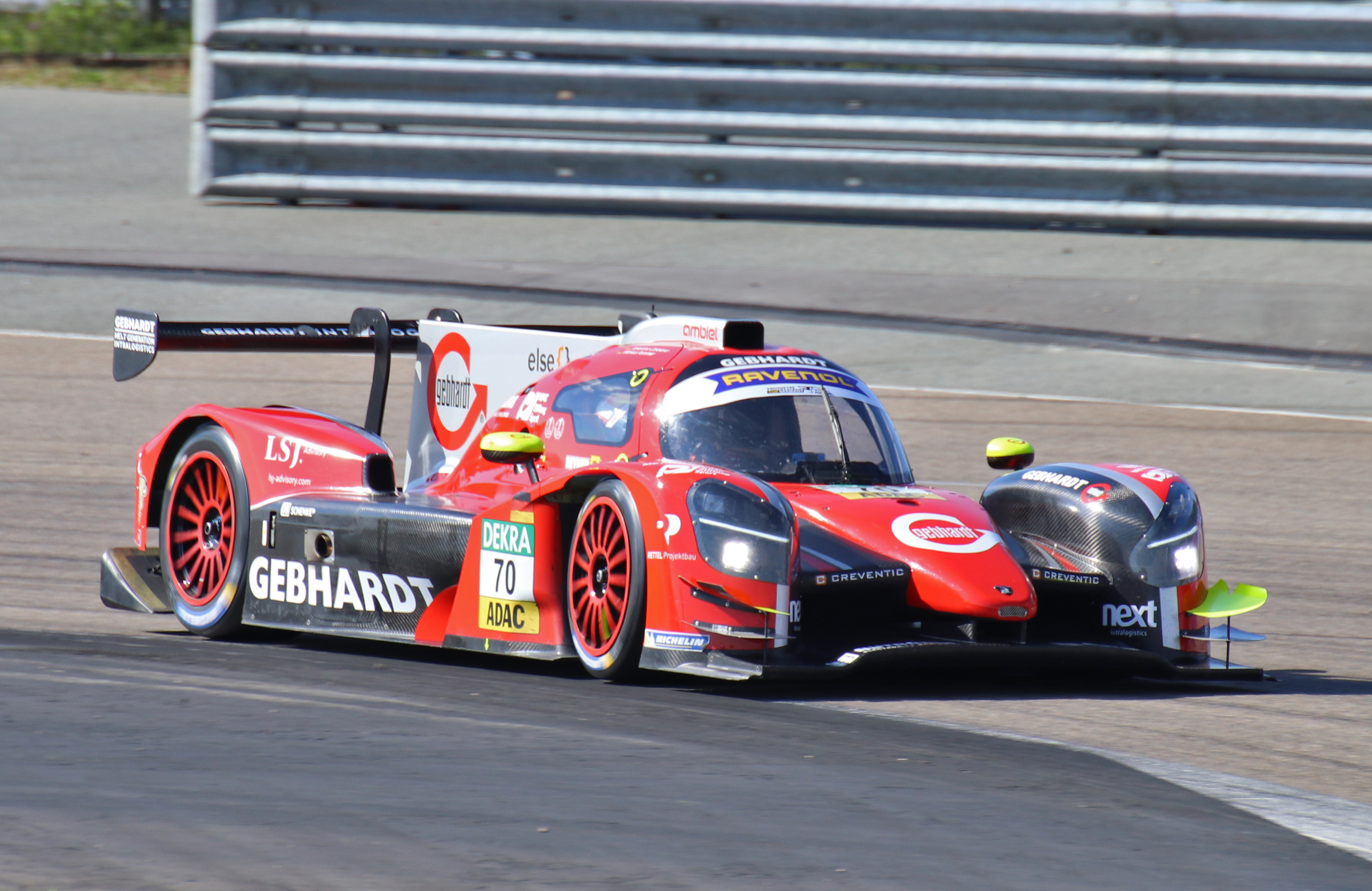
Gebhardt Motorsport and their No. 70 drivers won the Teams' and Drivers' championships

== Calendar ==
2024 Prototype Cup Germany

Round		Circuit	Date	Supporting
1	R1	Circuit de Spa-Francorchamps, Stavelot, French Community, Belgium	19–21 April	24H Series; Eurocup-3
1	R2	Circuit de Spa-Francorchamps, Stavelot, French Community, Belgium	19–21 April	24H Series; Eurocup-3
2	R1	Lausitzring, Klettwitz, Brandenburg, Germany	24–26 May	Deutsche Tourenwagen Masters
2	R2	Lausitzring, Klettwitz, Brandenburg, Germany	24–26 May	Deutsche Tourenwagen Masters
2	R3	Lausitzring, Klettwitz, Brandenburg, Germany	24–26 May	Deutsche Tourenwagen Masters
3	R1	Circuit Zandvoort, Zandvoort, North Holland, Netherlands	12–14 July	Zandvoort Summer Trophy; Eurocup-3; F4 British Championship
3	R2	Circuit Zandvoort, Zandvoort, North Holland, Netherlands	12–14 July	Zandvoort Summer Trophy; Eurocup-3; F4 British Championship
4	R1	Hockenheimring, Hockenheim, Baden-Württemberg, Germany	9–11 August	ADAC Racing Weekend
4	R2	Hockenheimring, Hockenheim, Baden-Württemberg, Germany	9–11 August	ADAC Racing Weekend
4	R3	Hockenheimring, Hockenheim, Baden-Württemberg, Germany	9–11 August	ADAC Racing Weekend
5	R1	Nürburgring, Nürburg, Rhineland-Palatinate, Germany	16–18 August	Deutsche Tourenwagen Masters; Porsche Carrera Cup Germany
5	R2	Nürburgring, Nürburg, Rhineland-Palatinate, Germany	16–18 August	Deutsche Tourenwagen Masters; Porsche Carrera Cup Germany
6	R1	Sachsenring, Hohenstein-Ernstthal, Saxony, Germany	6–8 September	Deutsche Tourenwagen Masters; Porsche Carrera Cup Germany
6	R2	Sachsenring, Hohenstein-Ernstthal, Saxony, Germany	6–8 September	Deutsche Tourenwagen Masters; Porsche Carrera Cup Germany

== Teams and drivers ==
Team	Chassis	No.	Drivers	Class	Rounds
(Luxembourg) Racing Experience	Duqueine M30 - D08	1	(Germany) Sebastian von Gartzen		1
(Luxembourg) Racing Experience	Duqueine M30 - D08	1	(Austria) Wolfgang Payr	T	1
(Luxembourg) Racing Experience	Duqueine M30 - D08	1	(Uruguay) Tomás Granzella	J	3
(Luxembourg) Racing Experience	Duqueine M30 - D08	1	(France) Laurent Prunet	T	3
(Austria) Konrad Motorsport	Ligier JS P320	2	(Germany) Torsten Kratz	T	All
(Austria) Konrad Motorsport	Ligier JS P320	2	(United States) Danny Soufi	J	All
(Germany) DataLab Sports with Rinaldi	Duqueine M30 - D08	7	(Germany) Luca Link	J	4–5
(Germany) DataLab Sports with Rinaldi	Duqueine M30 - D08	7	(Brazil) Suellio Almeida		4–5
(Germany) Rinaldi Racing	Ligier JS P320	71	(Germany) Stefan Aust	T	5
(Germany) BWT Mücke Motorsport	Duqueine M30 - D08	8	(Switzerland) Julien Apothéloz	J	All
(Germany) BWT Mücke Motorsport	Duqueine M30 - D08	8	(Italy) Riccardo Leone Cirelli	J	All
(Germany) MRS GT-Racing	Ligier JS P320	14	(Estonia) Antti Rammo	T	All
(Belgium) Mühlner Motorsport	Duqueine M30 - D08	21	(United Arab Emirates) Keanu Al Azhari	J	All
(Germany) US Racing	Ligier JS P320	27	(Germany) David Schumacher	G	5
(Germany) US Racing	Ligier JS P320	27	(Germany) Ralf Schumacher	G	5
(Germany) Frikadelli Racing Team	Ligier JS P320	30	(Germany) Klaus Abbelen	T	All
(Germany) Frikadelli Racing Team	Ligier JS P320	30	(Germany) Felipe Fernández Laser		All
(United Kingdom) BHK Motorsport	Duqueine M30 - D08	35	(Italy) Francesco Dracone		1
(Spain) AF2 Motorsport	Ligier JS P320	47	(Mexico) Jaime Guzmán	T	1–2, 5
(Spain) AF2 Motorsport	Ligier JS P320	47	(United States) Robert Doyle	T	1–2
(Spain) AF2 Motorsport	Ligier JS P320	47	(Denmark) Mikkel C. Johansen		5
(Germany) Gebhardt Motorsport	Duqueine M30 - D08	70	(Germany) Valentino Catalano	J	All
(Germany) Gebhardt Motorsport	Duqueine M30 - D08	70	(Germany) Markus Pommer		All
(Germany) Gebhardt Motorsport	Duqueine M30 - D08	80	(Belgium) Maxim Dirickx	J	All
(Germany) Gebhardt Motorsport	Duqueine M30 - D08	80	(Germany) Sven Barth		1–2
(Germany) Gebhardt Motorsport	Duqueine M30 - D08	80	(Germany) Jacob Erlbacher	J	3–6
(Germany) Momo Gebhardt Racing	Ginetta G61-LT-P3	90	(Germany) Sven Barth		3–6
(Germany) Momo Gebhardt Racing	Ginetta G61-LT-P3	90	(Germany) Michael Herich	T	3–4
(Germany) Momo Gebhardt Racing	Ginetta G61-LT-P3	90	(United Kingdom) Michael Lyons		5–6

Icon	Legend
J	Junior
T	Trophy
G	Guest

== Results ==
Round		Circuit	Pole position	Winners
1	R1	(Belgium) Circuit de Spa-Francorchamps	(Germany) No. 70 Gebhardt Motorsport	cancelled because of adverse weather conditions
1	R1	(Belgium) Circuit de Spa-Francorchamps	(Germany) Valentino Catalano (Germany) Markus Pommer	cancelled because of adverse weather conditions
1	R2	(Belgium) Circuit de Spa-Francorchamps	cancelled because of adverse weather conditions	
2	R1	(Germany) Lausitzring	(Germany) No. 70 Gebhardt Motorsport	(Germany) No. 70 Gebhardt Motorsport
2	R1	(Germany) Lausitzring	(Germany) Valentino Catalano (Germany) Markus Pommer	(Germany) Valentino Catalano (Germany) Markus Pommer
2	R2	(Germany) Lausitzring	(Germany) No. 8 BWT Mücke Motorsport	(Austria) No. 2 Konrad Motorsport
2	R2	(Germany) Lausitzring	(Switzerland) Julien Apothéloz (Italy) Riccardo Leone Cirelli	(Germany) Torsten Kratz (United States) Danny Soufi
2	R3	(Germany) Lausitzring	(Belgium) No. 21 Mühlner Motorsport	(Austria) No. 2 Konrad Motorsport
2	R3	(Germany) Lausitzring	(United Arab Emirates) Keanu Al Azhari	(Germany) Torsten Kratz (United States) Danny Soufi
3	R1	(Netherlands) Circuit Zandvoort	(Belgium) No. 21 Mühlner Motorsport	(Germany) No. 14 MRS GT-Racing
3	R1	(Netherlands) Circuit Zandvoort	(United Arab Emirates) Keanu Al Azhari	(Estonia) Antti Rammo
3	R2	(Netherlands) Circuit Zandvoort	(Belgium) No. 21 Mühlner Motorsport	(Belgium) No. 21 Mühlner Motorsport
3	R2	(Netherlands) Circuit Zandvoort	(United Arab Emirates) Keanu Al Azhari	(United Arab Emirates) Keanu Al Azhari
4	R1	(Germany) Hockenheimring	(Germany) No. 8 BWT Mücke Motorsport	(Germany) No. 8 BWT Mücke Motorsport
4	R1	(Germany) Hockenheimring	(Switzerland) Julien Apothéloz (Italy) Riccardo Leone Cirelli	(Switzerland) Julien Apothéloz (Italy) Riccardo Leone Cirelli
4	R2	(Germany) Hockenheimring	(Germany) No. 8 BWT Mücke Motorsport	(Germany) No. 8 BWT Mücke Motorsport
4	R2	(Germany) Hockenheimring	(Switzerland) Julien Apothéloz (Italy) Riccardo Leone Cirelli	(Switzerland) Julien Apothéloz (Italy) Riccardo Leone Cirelli
4	R3	(Germany) Hockenheimring	(Germany) No. 70 Gebhardt Motorsport	(Germany) No. 30 Frikadelli Racing Team
4	R3	(Germany) Hockenheimring	(Germany) Valentino Catalano (Germany) Markus Pommer	(Germany) Klaus Abbelen (Germany) Felipe Fernández Laser
5	R1	(Germany) Nürburgring	(Germany) No. 27 US Racing	(Germany) No. 27 US Racing
5	R1	(Germany) Nürburgring	(Germany) Ralf Schumacher (Germany) David Schumacher	(Germany) Ralf Schumacher (Germany) David Schumacher
5	R2	(Germany) Nürburgring	(Germany) No. 27 US Racing	(Germany) No. 27 US Racing
5	R2	(Germany) Nürburgring	(Germany) Ralf Schumacher (Germany) David Schumacher	(Germany) Ralf Schumacher (Germany) David Schumacher
6	R1	(Germany) Sachsenring	(Belgium) No. 21 Mühlner Motorsport	(Germany) No. 70 Gebhardt Motorsport
6	R1	(Germany) Sachsenring	(United Arab Emirates) Keanu Al Azhari	(Germany) Valentino Catalano (Germany) Markus Pommer
6	R2	(Germany) Sachsenring	(Belgium) No. 21 Mühlner Motorsport	(Belgium) No. 21 Mühlner Motorsport
6	R2	(Germany) Sachsenring	(United Arab Emirates) Keanu Al Azhari	(United Arab Emirates) Keanu Al Azhari

=== Drivers' Championship ===
1st	2nd	3rd	4th	5th	6th	7th	8th	9th	10th	11th	12th	13th	14th	15th
25	20	16	13	11	10	9	8	7	6	5	4	3	2	1

Pos.	Driver	Team	SPA (Belgium)		LAU (Germany)			ZAN (Netherlands)		HOC (Germany)			NÜR (Germany)		SAC (Germany)		Points
1	(Germany) Valentino Catalano (Germany) Markus Pommer	(Germany) Gebhardt Motorsport	C	C	1	3	2	3	5	DNS	2	3	4	2	1	3	206
2	(Germany) Torsten Kratz (United States) Danny Soufi	(Austria) Konrad Motorsport	C	C	2	1	1	2	3	3	8	2	6	8	6	4	197
3	(Switzerland) Julien Apothéloz (Italy) Riccardo Leone Cirelli	(Germany) BWT Mücke Motorsport	C	C	3	2	3	6	4	1	1	Ret	3	6	3	2	194
4	(United Arab Emirates) Keanu Al Azhari	(Belgium) Mühlner Motorsport	C	C	4	Ret	6	5	1	2	3	7	2	4	2	1	191
5	(Germany) Klaus Abbelen (Germany) Felipe Fernández Laser	(Germany) Frikadelli Racing Team	C	C	6	5	4	8	2	4	6	1	5	9	Ret	4	149
6	(Estonia) Antti Rammo	(Germany) MRS GT-Racing	C	C	5	4	7	1	6	6	4	4	Ret	3	5	Ret	135
7	(Germany) Sven Barth	(Germany) Gebhardt Motorsport (Germany) Momo Gebhardt Racing	C	C	7	6	5	7	7	Ret	5	8	Ret	11	4	4	99
8	(Belgium) Maxim Dirickx	(Germany) Gebhardt Motorsport	C	C	7	6	5	4	8	5	Ret	WD	8	10	6	Ret	92
9	(Germany) Jacob Erlbacher	(Germany) Gebhardt Motorsport						4	8	5	Ret	6	8	10	6	Ret	73
10	(Germany) Luca Link (Brazil) Suellio Almeida	(Germany) DataLab Sports with Rinaldi								Ret	7	5	9	7			38
11	(Germany) Michael Herich	(Germany) Momo Gebhardt Racing						7	7	Ret	5	8					37
12	(United Kingdom) Michael Lyons	(Germany) Momo Gebhardt Racing											Ret	11	4	4	32
13	(Germany) Stefan Aust	(Germany) Rinaldi Racing											7	5			23
14	(Mexico) Jaime Guzmán	(Spain) AF2 Motorsport	C	C	Ret	7	Ret						DSQ	12			13
15	(United States) Robert Doyle	(Spain) AF2 Motorsport	C	C	Ret	7	Ret										9
16	(Denmark) Mikkel C. Johansen	(Spain) AF2 Motorsport											DSQ	12			5
NC	(Uruguay) Tomás Granzella (France) Laurent Prunet	(Luxembourg) Racing Experience						Ret	Ret								0
Guest drivers ineligible to score points
—	(Germany) David Schumacher (Germany) Ralf Schumacher	(Germany) US Racing											1	1			—
Pos.	Driver		SPA (Belgium)		LAU (Germany)			ZAN (Netherlands)		HOC (Germany)			NÜR (Germany)		SAC (Germany)		Points
