= List of people with surname O'Grady =

A number of notable people have the O'Grady surname:

- Alex O'Grady (born 2008), Irish racing driver
- Bernard Cyril O'Grady (born 1931), Australian-born Roman Catholic bishop
- Brittany O'Grady (born 1996), American actress
- Chris O'Grady (born 1986), British footballer
- Conn Standish O'Grady (1888–1968), Irish aviator
- Des O'Grady (1952–2025), Irish Gaelic footballer
- Dónal O'Grady (born 1953), Irish hurler and manager
- Eimear O'Grady, Irish stuntwoman
- Frances O'Grady, Baroness O'Grady of Upper Holloway (born 1959), British former trade union leader
- Gail O'Grady (born 1963), American actress
- George O'Grady (1891–1974), Canadian ice hockey player
- Geraldine O'Grady (1932–2025), Irish classical violinist
- Graeme O'Grady (born 1953), Australian rugby league footballer
- James O'Grady (1866–1934), British trade unionist and politician
- John O'Grady, several people
- Kieren O'Grady (born 1963), New Zealand former field hockey player
- Lani O'Grady (1954–2001), American actress and talent agent
- Liam O'Grady (born 1950), American federal judge
- Lorraine O'Grady (1934–2024), American conceptual artist
- Mac O'Grady (born 1951), American professional golfer
- Mary O'Grady, American editor and columnist
- Oliver O'Grady (born 1945), Irish laicized Roman Catholic priest and convicted child molester
- Paul O'Grady (disambiguation), several people
- Peter O'Grady (1903–1980), Irish hurler
- Rohan O'Grady, pen name of Canadian novelist June O'Grady Skinner (1922–2014)
- Scott O'Grady (born 1965), American former Air Force pilot and survivor
- Sean O'Grady, several people
- Standish O'Grady, several people
- Stuart O'Grady (born 1973), Australian former professional road bicycle racer
- Terry O'Grady (1934–1987), British rugby league footballer

== Fictional characters ==
- George O'Grady, fictional character played by George Carlin on The George Carlin Show
- Toxteth O'Grady, fictional character from British comedy show The Young Ones
