= Archdeacon of Killaloe, Kilfenora, Clonfert and Kilmacduagh =

Province of Dublin
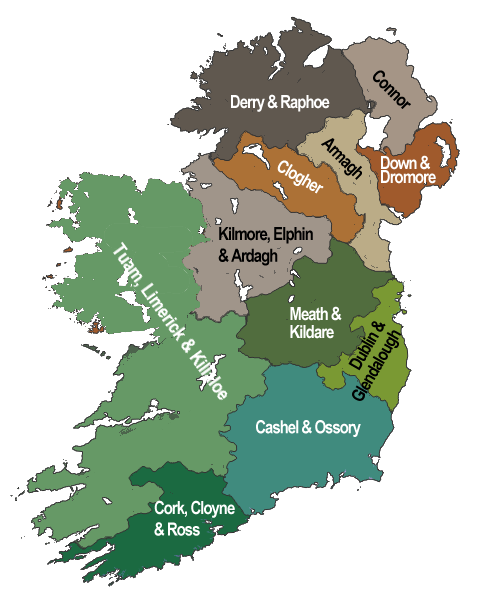
- Church: Church of Ireland
- Metropolitan bishop: Archbishop of Dublin
- Cathedral: Christ Church Cathedral, Dublin
- Dioceses: 5

The Archdeacon of Killaloe, Kilfenora, Clonfert and Kilmacduagh is a senior ecclesiastical officer within the Anglican Diocese of Limerick and Killaloe. As such he or she is responsible for the disciplinary supervision of the clergy within the Diocese. As of 2020, the incumbent was Wayne Carney.

The archdeaconry can trace its history back to Donat O'Kennedy, the first known Archdeacon of Killaloe, who became its Bishop in 1231; Charles, Archdeacon of Kilfenora, who held the office in 1302; Meiler De Burgo, Archdeacon of Clonfert, who held office from 1550 to 1587; and Florence M'Anoglaigh, Archdeacon of Kilmacduagh who held office during 1333.
