= Benona Sprague =

American Civil War Medal of Honor recipient (1833–1908)

Corporal Benona Sprague
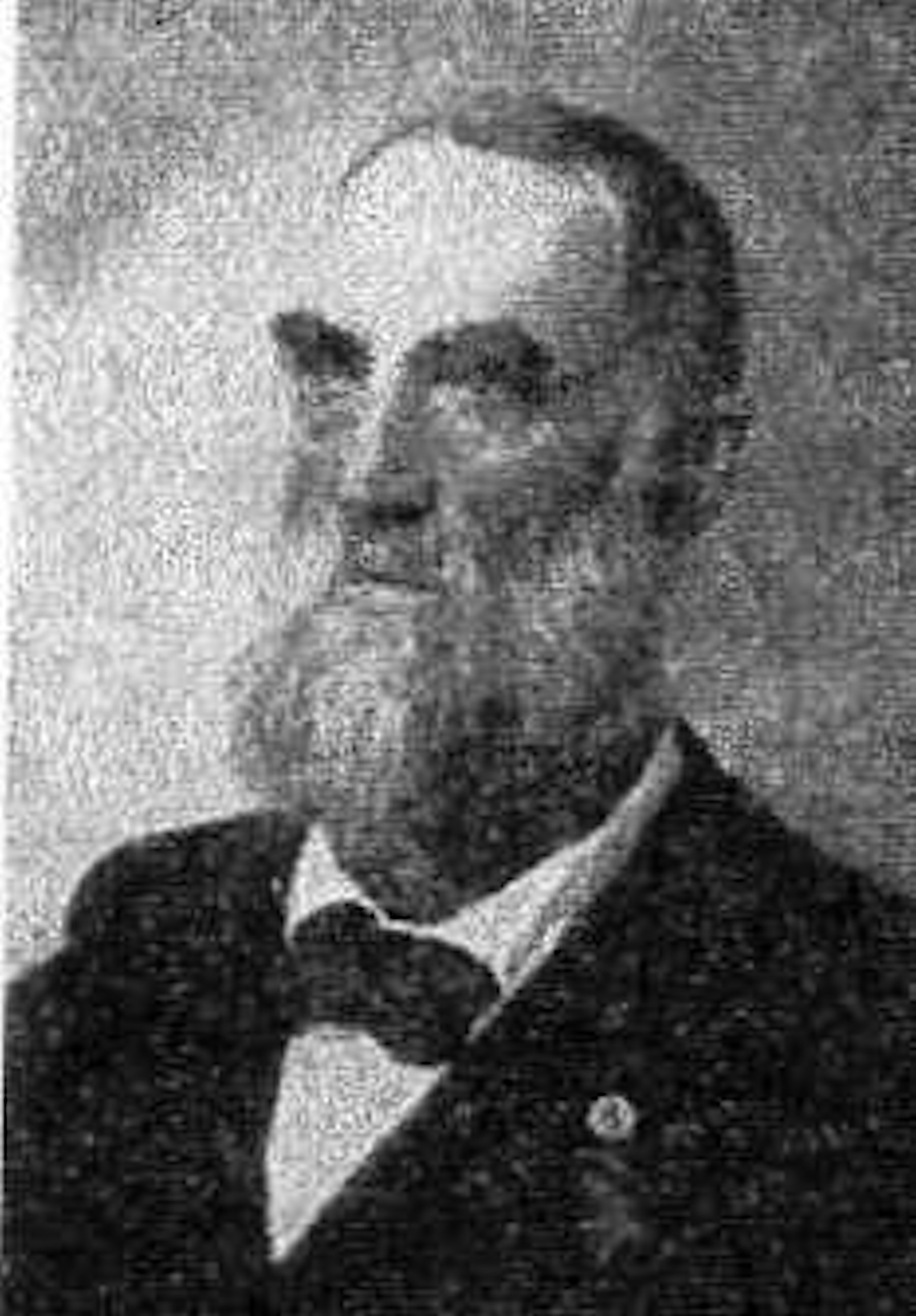
- Sprague c. 1900
- Born: 15 February 1833; Salina, New York, US
- Died: 19 June 1908 (aged 75); Cheney's Grove, Illinois, US
- Burial place: Riverside Cemetery, Saybrook, Illinois
- Children: 2
- Military career
- Allegiance: United States (Union)
- Branch: Army
- Service years: 1861-1865
- Rank: Sergeant
- Unit: 116th Illinois Infantry Regiment
- Conflicts: Siege of Vicksburg, American Civil War
- Awards: Medal of Honor

Benona Sprague (15 February 1833 – 19 June 1908) was a corporal in the United States Army who was awarded the Medal of Honor for gallantry during the American Civil War. On May 22, 1863, during the Siege of Vicksburg, he led a volunteer storming party against Confederate fortifications. He was issued the Medal of Honor on 10 July 1894.

== Personal life ==
Sprague was born in Salina, New York, on 15 February 1833, to parents Myron Benona Sprague and Sarah Ann Spike. He was one of six children. He married Martha Elen Cornwell Sprague (1840-1919) and had three sons, Charles M. Sprague (1860-1936), William H. Sprague (1870-1916), and Henry C. Sprague (1881-1957) as well as one daughter, Mary E. Sprague (1963-1884). He died on 19 June 1908 at his home in Cheney's Grove, Illinois, and is buried in Riverside Cemetery in Saybrook, Illinois.

== Military service ==
Sprague served with Company F of the US Army's 116th Illinois Infantry and Company A of the Illinois 1st Light Artillery, entering service at Cheney's Grove. The highest rank he achieved was sergeant. On May 22, 1863, during the Siege of Vicksburg in Mississippi, he led a volunteer storming party of approximately 150 men against Confederate fortifications, of which approximately half were alive at the end of the war. As a survivor of the charge, he was one of four soldiers awarded the Medal of Honor for bravery during the action.
