= Dunsterville =

Dunsterville is a family surname. Some notable people from this family include:

- Edward Dunsterville (priest), (17th Century), Archdeacon of Kilmacduagh
- Hugh Dunsterville, (17th Century), Archdeacon of Cloyne
- Edward Dunsterville (1796–1873), British Naval Officer and Hydrographer
- Lionel Dunsterville (1865–1946), British Major General
- G. C. K. Dunsterville (1905–1988), British Business Executive and Orchidologist
