= Cecil Burrows =

Cecil Burrows was an Anglican Archdeacon in Ireland.

Shannon was educated at Trinity College, Dublin and ordained in 1927. He served at St Peter, Dublin (Curate); St Patrick's Cathedral, Dublin (Succentor); and Clonfert (Incumbent). He was Archdeacon of Clonfert and Kilmacduagh from 1947 until 1970.
