= Frank Gillespie =

American politician (1869–1954)

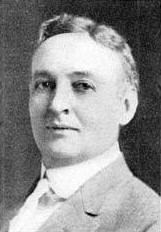

Member of the U.S. House of Representatives from Illinois's 17th district
- In office March 4, 1933 – January 3, 1935
- Preceded by: Homer W. Hall
- Succeeded by: Leslie C. Arends

Member of the Illinois House of Representatives from the 26th district
- In office January 8, 1913 – January 13, 1915 Serving with Abraham C. Thompson, William H. Rowe
- Preceded by: Daniel D. Donahue; William H. Wright; John A. Montelius
- Succeeded by: Daniel D. Donahue; James C. Harvey

Personal details
- Born: April 18, 1869 White Sulphur Springs, West Virginia
- Died: November 26, 1954 (aged 85) Bloomington, Illinois
- Party: Democratic

James Frank Gillespie (April 18, 1869 – November 26, 1954) was an American politician who was a U.S. representative from Illinois from 1933 to 1935.

== Biography ==
Born in White Sulphur Springs, Greenbrier County, West Virginia, Gillespie attended the graded schools and Concord Normal School. He taught in the public schools at White Sulphur Springs, W.Virginia, in 1891 and 1892. Principal of White Sulphur Springs High School in 1891. He studied law at Central College, Danville, Indiana. He was admitted to the bar in 1892 and commenced practice in Charleston, West Virginia. He moved to Bloomington, McLean County, Illinois, in 1894 and continued the practice of law. He also engaged in agricultural pursuits. He served in the Illinois House of Representatives in 1913 and 1914.

Gillespie was elected as a Democrat to the Seventy-third Congress (March 4, 1933 – January 3, 1935). He was an unsuccessful candidate for reelection in 1934 to the Seventy-fourth Congress and for election in 1936 to the Seventy-fifth Congress.

He resumed the practice of law in Bloomington, Illinois, until his death there on November 26, 1954. He was interred in Park Hill Cemetery.

Illinois House of Representatives
Preceded by Daniel D. Donahue; William H. Wright; John A. Montelius	Member of the Illinois House of Representatives from the 26th district 1913–1915; Served alongside: Abraham C. Thompson, William H. Rowe	Succeeded by Daniel D. Donahue; James C. Harvey
U.S. House of Representatives
Preceded by Frank H. Funk	Member of the U.S. House of Representatives from Illinois's 17th congressional district 1933-1935	Succeeded by Leslie C. Arends
