= William O'Grady =

William O'Grady may refer to:

- William O'Grady (cleric) (1801–1859), Irish religious leader
- William O'Grady (footballer) (1924–1985), Irish Olympic footballer
- William O'Grady (linguist) (born 1952), American linguist, known for work in syntax, acquisition, and Korean
- William John O'Grady (died 1840), Irish Catholic priest and journalist in Upper Canada

== See also ==
- William O'Grady Haly, British army officer
