= Richard Vincent =

Richard Vincent may refer to:

- Richard Vincent, Baron Vincent of Coleshill (1931−2018), British Army officer
- Richard Vincent (cricketer) (1846–1924), English cricketer
- Richard Vincent (playwright) (born 1969), English playwright, theatre director and screenwriter
- Richard Vincent (priest) (died 1834), Anglican priest in Ireland
