= Edward Rush =

Edward Rush may refer to:

- Edward Rush (cricketer), Australian cricketer
- Edward Rush (priest), Irish Anglican priest

== See also ==
- Eddie Rush (born 1961), basketball referee
- Ed T. Rush (born 1942), basketball referee
- Ed Rush, drum and bass producer and DJ
