= William Rowe =

William Rowe may refer to:

- William Rowe (Lord Mayor of London) (died 1593)
- William Rowe (politician) (1819–1886), member of parliament in New Zealand
- William Rowe (athlete) (1913–1938), American hammer thrower
- William Rowe (cricketer) (1892–1972), Australian cricketer
- William B. Rowe (1910–1955), American artist and art educator
- William Carpenter Rowe (died 1860), chief justice of British Ceylon
- William E. Rowe (1820–1888), American farmer and politician from Wisconsin
- William H. Rowe (1860–1947), American farmer, businessman, and politician from Illinois
- William Hutchinson Rowe (1882–1955), American historian and author
- William Earl Rowe (1894–1984), politician in Ontario, Canada
- William L. Rowe (1931–2015), American philosopher of religion
- William N. Rowe (1867–1916), member of the Royal Irish Constabulary
- William T. Rowe (born 1947) American historian of China
- Bill Rowe (born 1942), broadcaster, lawyer and politician
- Bill Rowe (sound engineer) (1931–1992), English sound engineer
- William Rowe, Cornish farmer murdered in 1963, see murder of William Rowe

== See also ==
- William Rowe Lyall, dean of Canterbury
- William Roe (disambiguation)
- William Row (1563–1634), Scottish presbyterian divine
- William Bickford Row (1786–1865), English-born Newfoundland merchant, lawyer and politician
