= Alexander Alcock =

Alexander Alcock may refer to:

- Alexander Alcock (dean of Lismore) (fl. 1725–1747), Irish Anglican priest
- Alexander Alcock (junior) (died 1787), his son, Irish Anglican priest, archdeacon of Lismore
- Alexander Alcock (archdeacon of Kilmacduagh) (1744–1807), Anglican priest in Ireland
