= Richard Shannon (priest) =

Richard Shannon was an Anglican archdeacon in Ireland.

Shannon was educated at Trinity College, Dublin and ordained in 1888. He served at Stradbally (curate); Thurles (curate); Lismalin (Incumbent); and Aughrim (incumbent); He was Archdeacon of Clonfert and Kilmacduagh from 1925.
