= William Roe =

William Roe may refer to:

- William Roe (civil servant) (1748–1826), English customs official and auditor
- William F. Roe (1904–1982), Irish electrical engineer
- William Roe (priest) (died 1882), Anglican Archdeacon in Ireland
- William James Roe (1843—1921), American writer
- Bill Roe (cricketer) (1861–1937), English cricketer
- Bill Roe (American football) (1958–2003), American football linebacker
- Bill Roe (hurdler) (born 1946), American hurdler, 1965 All-American for the Washington Huskies track and field team
- Gordon Roe (William Gordon Roe, 1932–1999), English bishop
- Billy Roe (born 1957), former Indy Racing League driver

== See also ==
- William Rowe (disambiguation)
