= Richard Shannon =

Richard Shannon may refer to:

- Richard Shannon (actor) (1920–1989), American actor
- Richard Shannon (historian), British historian and professor at Swansea
- Richard Shannon (priest), 20th century Archdeacon of Clonfert and Kilmacduagh
- Richard C. Shannon (1839–1920), American politician
