= Thomas Bredin =

Thomas Andrew Noble Bredin (1927–1989) was Dean of Clonmacnoise from 1979 until 1989.

Bredin was educated at Trinity College, Dublin. He was ordained in 1952. After a curacy in Waterford he was Dean's Vicar at Kilkenny Cathedral. He also held incumbencies at Moynalty, Roscrea and Kilteskill. He was Archdeacon of Killaloe, Kilfenora, Clonfert and Kilmacduagh before his time as Dean.
