= William H. Rowe =

American politician

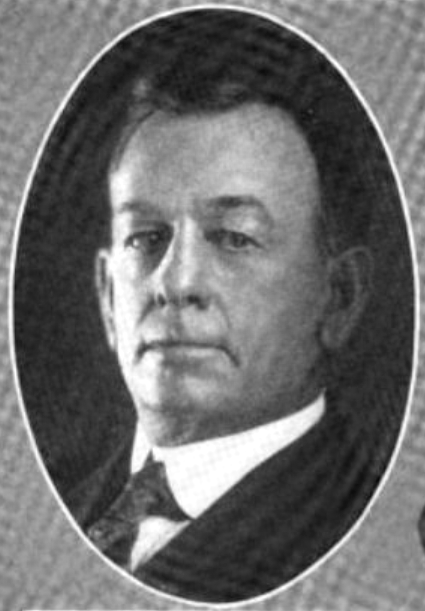

Member of the Illinois House of Representatives
- In office 1912–1924

Personal details
- Born: February 25, 1860 Fayette County, Illinois
- Died: May 6, 1947 (aged 87) Bloomington, Illinois
- Party: Republican
- Occupation: Businessman, farmer, politician

William H. Rowe (February 25, 1860 – May 6, 1947) was an American businessman, farmer, and politician.

== Biography ==
Rowe was born in Fayette County, Illinois. He moved with his parents in 1864 and settled near Saybrook, Illinois. Rowe was a farmer and livestock dealer. He was involved with the banking business. Rowe served on the McLean County Board of Supervisors and was chairman of the county board. He also served on the school board and the Cheney's Grove town board. Rowe served in the Illinois House of Representatives from 1913 to 1923 and was a Republican. In 1923, Rowe moved to Bloomington, Illinois. Rowe died at Brokaw Hospital in Bloomington, Illinois.
