= Henry Daly (priest) =

Irish Anglican priest

Henry Varian Daly (20 July 1838 – 3 June 1925) was an Anglican archdeacon in Ireland in the late nineteenth and early twentieth centuries.

Daly was educated at Trinity College, Dublin. He was ordained in 1861, and served curacies in Waterford, Ballinasloe and Killinane. He was Rector of Gort from 1874, the last discrete Archdeacon of Clonfert from 1881, and Archdeacon of Kilmacduagh from 1891, holding all three positions until his death.
