= Robert Jones (dean of Clonmacnoise) =

Robert William Jones was Dean of Clonmacnoise from 2002 until 2012.

Jones was born in 1955 and educated at Trinity College, Dublin. He was ordained in 1980. After curacies in Seapatrick and Bangor he held incumbencies at Drumgath, Finaghy, Cairncastle and Athlone before his time as Dean. Since 2012 he has been at St John Malone, Belfast.
