= Thomas Perry (priest) =

Thomas Victor Perry (1908–1989) was Dean of Clonmacnoise from 1961 until 1979.

Perry was educated at Trinity College, Dublin. He served at Carlow, Bolarum, Calicut and Madras; and, during World War II as a Chaplain to the Forces. When peace returned he served incumbencies in Kilmallock, Kilmessan and Trim before his time as Dean.
