= Standish O'Grady, 1st Viscount Guillamore =

Irish peer

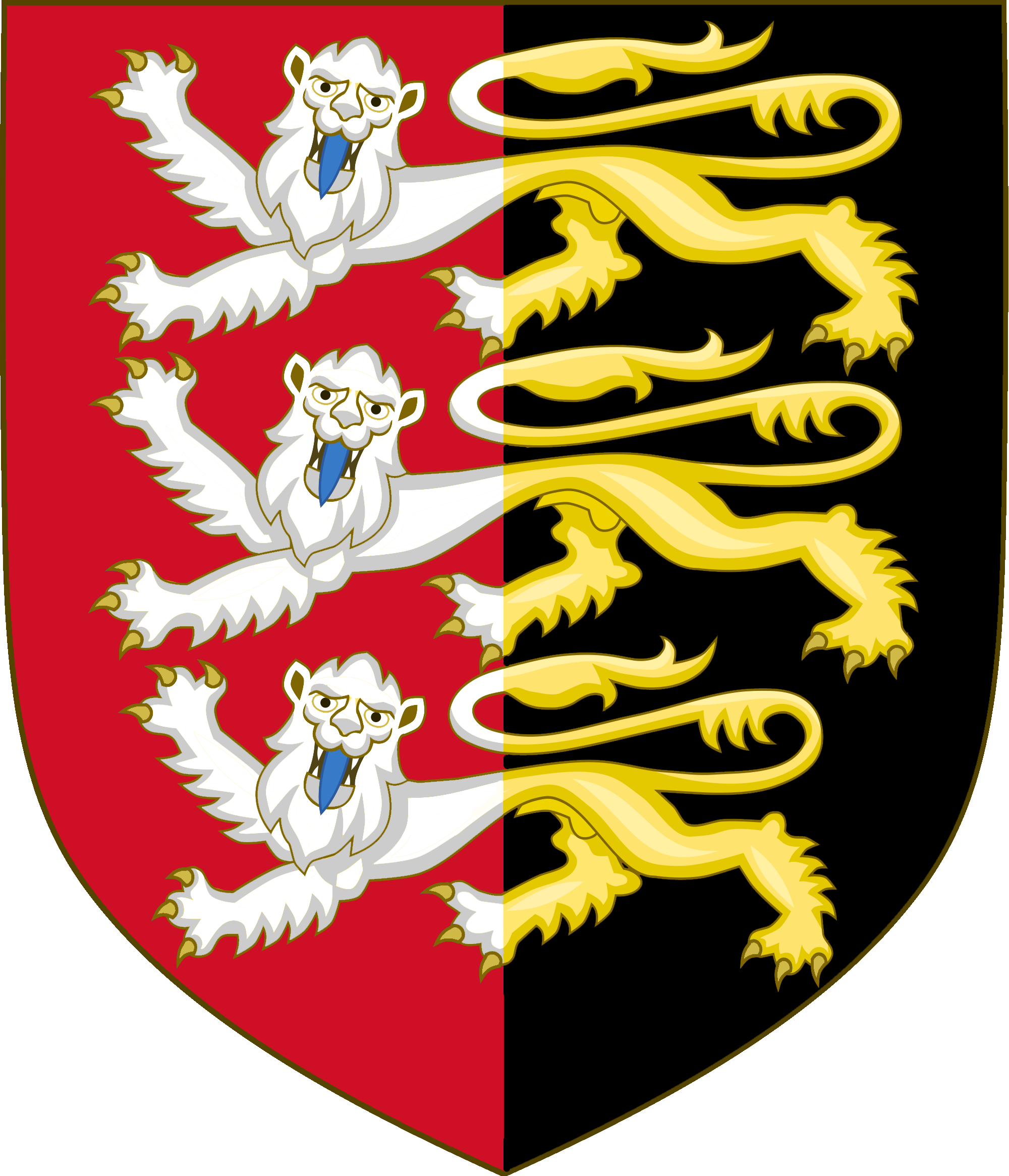
Arms of O'Grady: Per pale gules and sable, three lions passant guardant in pale per pale argent and or

The Rt. Hon. Standish O'Grady, 1st Viscount Guillamore, PC (1766 – 21 April 1840), from Cahir Guillamore, County Limerick, served as Lord Chief Baron of the Exchequer for Ireland for a number of years. He was created Viscount Guillamore by a patent of 28 January 1831.

== Biography ==
O'Grady was the eldest son of Darby O'Grady of Mount Prospect, Limerick, and of Mary, daughter of James Smyth of the same county. (Note: Standish O'Grady was brother to Hayes O'Grady, who became an Admiral in the Royal Navy, and uncle to the Irish antiquarian Standish Hayes O'Grady.) He was born on 20 January 1766, and, entering Trinity College, Dublin, graduated B.A. in 1784. He was called to the bar, and went on the Munster circuit. He was remarkable for wit as well as learning, and built up a considerable practice. He inherited the Cahir Guillamore estate on the death of his uncle John and was appointed High Sheriff of County Limerick for 1790.

On 10 June 1803, after the murder of Lord Kilwarden, O'Grady became Attorney-General and was sworn of the Privy Council of Ireland. He was one of the prosecuting counsel at the trial of Robert Emmet. In October 1805 he was made Lord Chief Baron, in succession to Lord Avonmore. He was a sound judge, and David Richard Pigot, his successor as Chief Baron of the Irish Exchequer, expressed the opinion: "O'Grady was the ablest man whose mind I ever saw at work". His witticisms on and off the bench were long remembered. O'Grady was one of the first to suspect the duplicity of the notorious informer Leonard McNally. He clashed with his superiors in 1816 when they brought quo warranto proceedings to challenge his right to appoint his son Waller as a Court clerk.

On his retirement from the bench in 1831, O'Grady was created Viscount Guillamore of Cahir Guillamore and Baron O'Grady of Rockbarton, co. Limerick, in the peerage of Ireland. The O'Grady seat was Cahir Guillamore, close to Lough Gur. He was a handsome man, of a fine presence, and over 6 feet (1.8 m) in stature. He died in Dublin on 20 April 1840.

== Family ==
In 1790 O'Grady married Katharine (died 1853), second daughter of John Thomas Waller of Castletown, co. Limerick, with whom he had at least twelve children:

- Sons
  - Standish O'Grady, 2nd Viscount Guillamore (1792–1848) Lieutenant-Colonel in the British Army, married Gertrude-Jane, daughter of Berkeley Paget: they had nine children, including the 3rd, 4th and 5th Viscounts.
  - Waller, barrister-at-law, married on 26 June 1823, Grace-Elizabeth, eldest daughter of Hugh, 3rd Baron Massy. He became a Serjeant-at-law (Ireland) and Commissioner of the Irish Insolvency Court.
  - John, joined the Royal Navy.
  - Thomas, an officer in the British Army.
  - William (1801-1859), a Church of England clergyman who became Archdeacon of Kilmacduagh.
- *Richard 1808-1875), Chief Examiner to the Court of Exchequer (Ireland).
- Daughters
  - Maria, married on 13 December 1814, John Vereker, 3rd Viscount Gort.
  - Katherine (d.1829), married Dudley Persse of Roxburgh, in County Galway, a cousin of the celebrated author Lady Gregory.
  - Isabella, who never married.

== Notes ==
Peerage of Ireland
New creation	Viscount Guillamore; 1831 – 1840	Succeeded by Standish O'Grady
