= Henry Wright (priest) =

Irish Anglican priest

Henry Wright was Archdeacon of Kilmacduagh" p105: from 1745 until his death in 1750.

Wright was born in Dublin and educated at Trinity College, Dublin. He was a Prebendary of Clonfert from 1721 until his death.
