= O'Grady family =

Irish noble family

O'Grady Ó Grádaigh
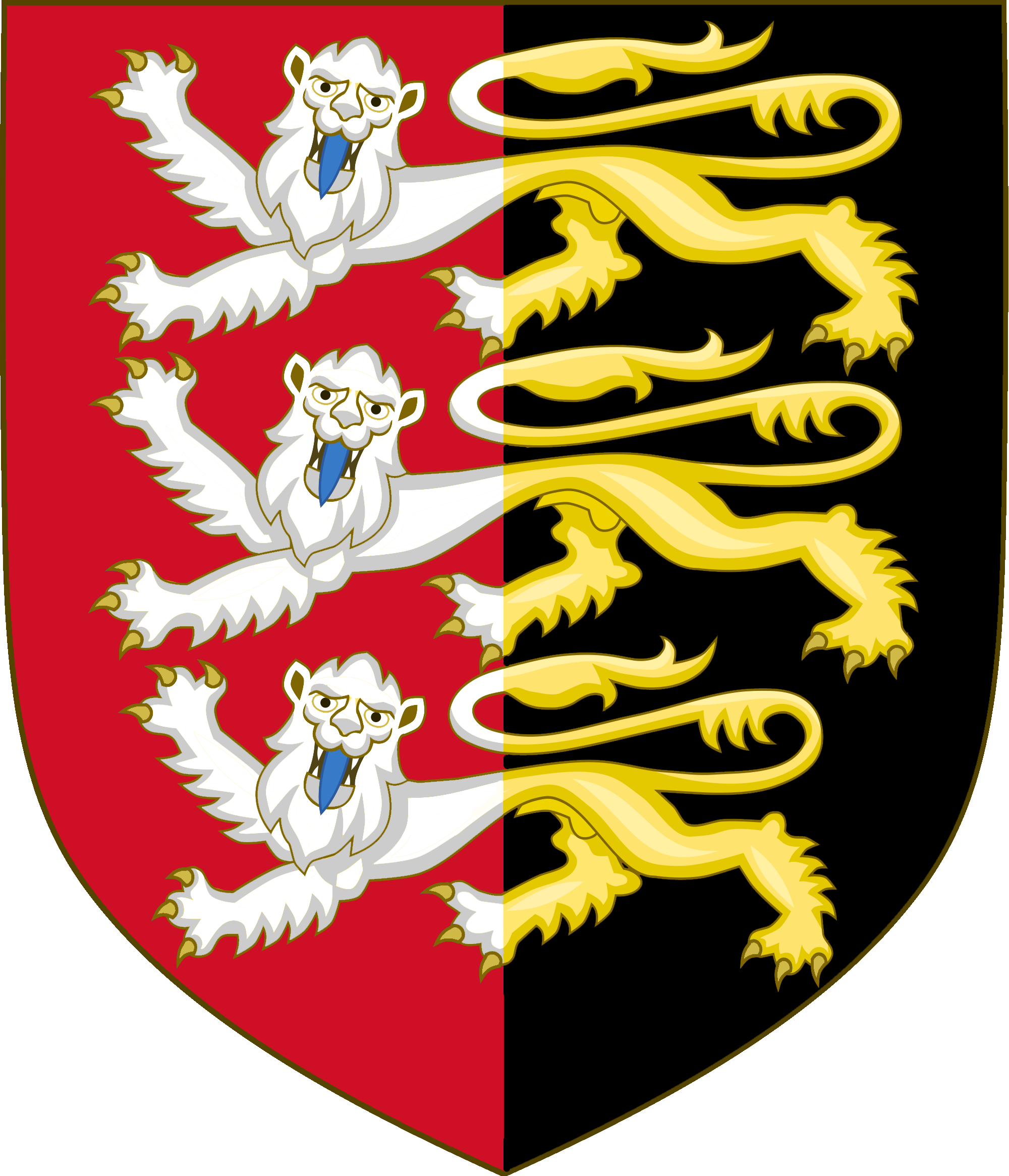
- Arms of O'Grady: Per pale gules and sable, three lions passant guardant in pale per pale argent and or
- Parent house: Dál gCais
- Country: Kingdom of Thomond
- Titles: Lord of The Banner; Viscount Guillamore

The O'Grady family, also styled O'Grady of Kilballyowen, is one of Ireland's noble families and surviving Chiefs of the Name. Their title is The O'Grady in English and Ó Gráda in Irish.

== Naming conventions ==
Male	Daughter	Wife (Long)	Wife (Short)
Ó Grádaigh	Ní Ghrádaigh	Bean Uí Ghrádaigh	Uí Ghrádaigh
Ó Gráda	Ní Ghráda	Bean Uí Ghráda	Uí Ghráda

== History ==
They belong to the Dál gCais kindred and are distant cousins to the O'Brien dynasty, but have since the Middle Ages been based not in County Clare, from where they originated, but in County Limerick. The seat of the family, Kilballyowen, is near the town of Bruff.

According to historian C. Thomas Cairney, the O'Gradys were one of the chiefly families of the Dal gCais or Dalcassians who were a tribe of the Erainn who were the second wave of Celts to settle in Ireland between about 500 and 100 BC.

The name Standish was often used by the family; it derives from the marriage in 1633 of Darby O'Grady, The O'Grady, to Faith Standish.

Some of the O'Grady family converted to the Church of Ireland (Anglican Communion) and produced a Bishop of Meath, Hugh Brady. The family also produced some prominent historians such as Standish Hayes O'Grady and Standish James O'Grady, as well as Henry Fox Talbot, inventor, scientist and photography pioneer, and the Australian poet David Musgrave.

The now extinct title in the peerage of Ireland, the Viscount Guillamore, was held by the family.

== See also ==
- List of people with surname O'Grady
- Irish clans
