= Dean of Clonmacnoise =

Church of Ireland official

The Dean of Clonmacnoise is an office based at the Cathedral Church of St Patrick, Trim in the United Diocese of Meath and Kildare within the Church of Ireland.

Abigail Sines has been the incumbent since October 2025.

== List of deans of Clonmacnoise ==
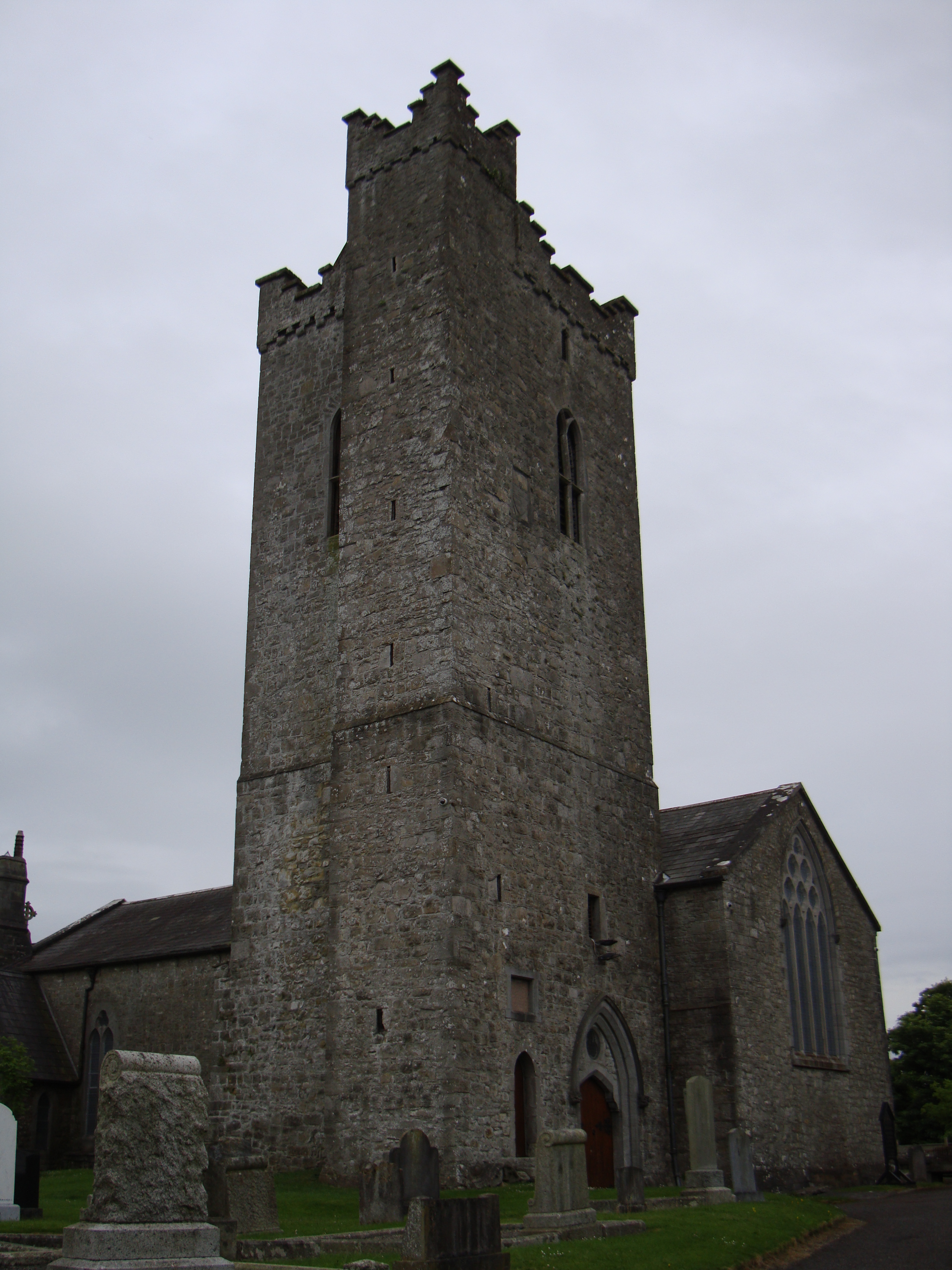
Trim Cathedral

- 1561 William Flynn
- 1579 Miler M'Clery
- 1601 William Leicester
- 1628 Marcus Lynch
- 1629 Richard Price
- 1633 Samuel Clarke
- 1634 William Burley
- 1661 John Kerdiffe
- 1668–1681 Henry Cottingham (afterwards Archdeacon of Meath, 1681)
- 1681 Theophilus Harrison
- 16nn–1720 Stephen Handcock (deprived under James II, but restored 1697)
- 1720–1741 Anthony Dopping (afterwards Bishop of Ossory, 1741)
- 1742 John Owen
- 1761 Arthur Champagne
- 1800–1806 Charles Mongan Warburton (afterwards Bishop of Limerick, 1806)
- 1806 Thomas Vesey Dawson
- 1811->1842 Henry Roper
- 1847–1862 Richard Butler
- 1862–1882 John Brownlow
- 1882–1885 Charles Parsons Reichel (afterwards Bishop of Meath, 1885)
- 1885–1892 Francis Swifte
- 1892–1900 Richard Dowse
- 1900–1904 Graham Craig
- 1904–1912 Richard Stuart Dobbs Campbell
- 1923-1930 Richard Stewart Craig
- 1958-1961 Robert Charters
- 1961-1979 Thomas Victor Perry
- 1979-1989 Thomas Andrew Noble Bredin
- 1989-1996 John Alan Gardiner Barrett
- 1997–2002 Andrew William Ussher Furlong
- 2002–2012 Robert William Jones
- 2013–2024 Paul Bogle
- 2026–present Abigail Sines
