= Robert King (archdeacon of Kilmacduagh) =

Irish Anglican cleric

Robert King (born 1769 or 1770) was an Anglican Archdeacon in Ireland in the first third of the nineteenth century.

King was born in Dublin, his father Robert also being a clergyman. He was educated at Trinity College Dublin (Scholar 1778, BA 1790, MA 1809). He was Archdeacon of Kilmacduagh from 1815 until his resignation in 1830.
