= Hugh Dunsterville =

Irish Anglican cleric

Hugh Dunsterville was Archdeacon of Cloyne from 1661 until 1665.

Dunsterville was educated at Trinity College, Dublin. He held livings at Kinvarra; Annaghdown; Kilbrogan; and Dunderrow. Dunsterville was appointed a Prebendary of Kilmacduagh in 1638; of Clonfert in 1639; and of Cork in 1661.

His father was Archdeacon of Kilmacduagh from 1630 until 1637.
