= Robert Charters =

Robert James Charters was Dean of Clonmacnoise from 1958 until 1961.

Charters was educated at Trinity College, Dublin. He served curacies at Ballymoney, Ashted, Carlow and Oldcastle; and incumbencies in Bailieborough, Drumconrath, Kilcleagh, Dunboyne and Drogheda before his time as Dean.
