= Paul Bogle (priest) =

Irish priest

Paul David Bogle was Dean of Clonmacnoise from 2013 to 2024.

Bogle was born in 1957 and educated at the Church of Ireland Theological Institute. He was ordained in 2011. After a curacy in Dunboyne he was the incumbent at Trim from 2013.
