= Thomas Magee =

Irish Anglican archdeacon

Thomas Perceval Magee (1797–1857) was an Anglican Archdeacon in Ireland in the late nineteenth century: in 1831 Daniel O'Connell stated in the British House of Houses that he held 11 livings.

Magee was educated at Trinity College, Dublin. He was a Prebendary of Christ Church Cathedral, Dublin and Archdeacon of Kilmacduagh from 1830 until his death on 16 December 1857.

His nephew was Archbishop of York for a short period in 1891.
