= Leslie C. Arends =

American politician (1895–1985)

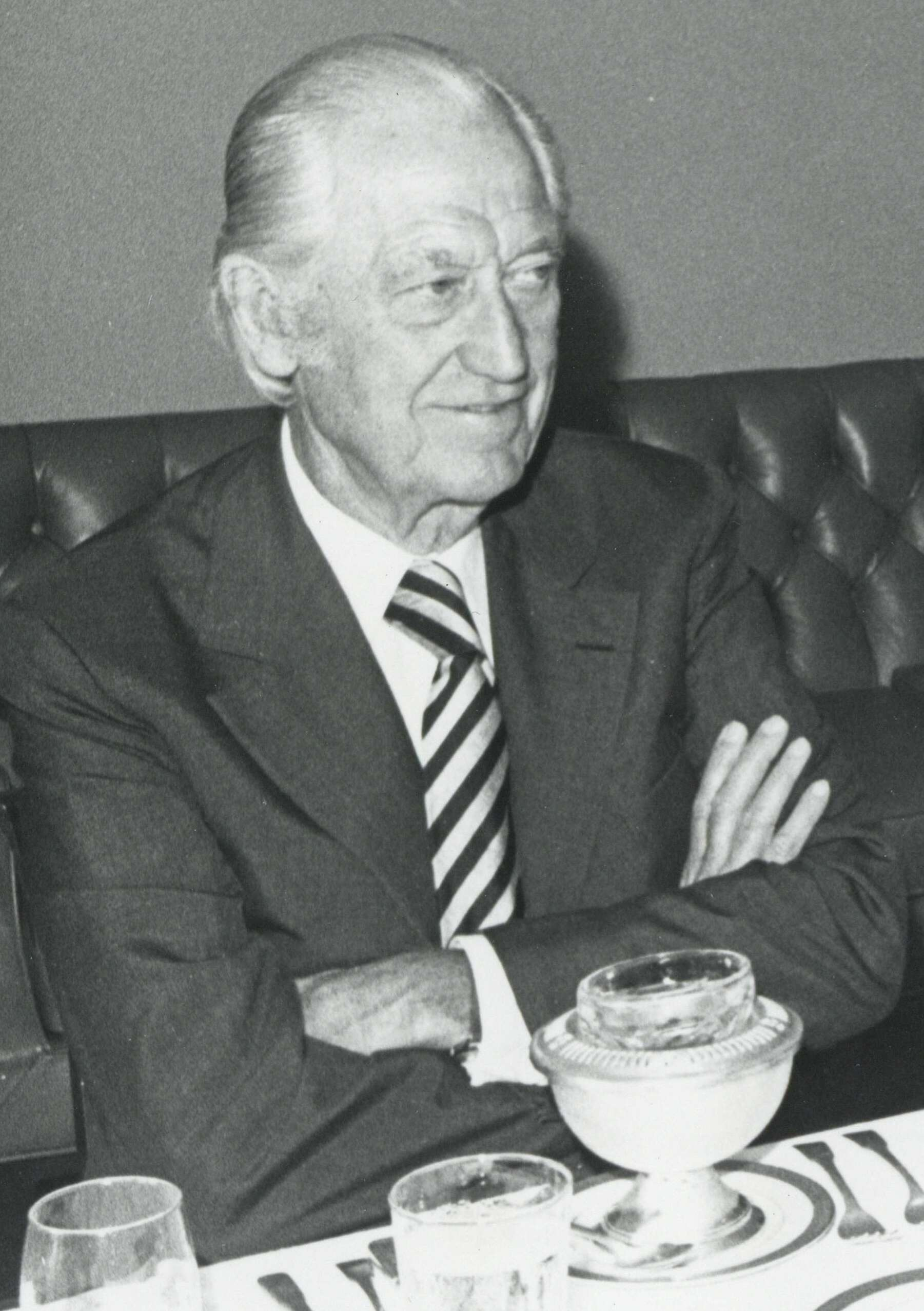
- Arends in 1973

House Minority Whip
- In office January 3, 1955 – December 31, 1974
- Leader: Joseph W. Martin Jr. Charles A. Halleck; Gerald Ford; John J. Rhodes
- Preceded by: John W. McCormack
- Succeeded by: Robert H. Michel
- In office January 3, 1949 – January 3, 1953
- Leader: Joseph W. Martin Jr.
- Preceded by: John W. McCormack
- Succeeded by: John W. McCormack
- In office May 13, 1943 – January 3, 1947
- Leader: Joseph W. Martin Jr.
- Preceded by: Harry L. Englebright
- Succeeded by: John W. McCormack

House Majority Whip
- In office January 3, 1953 – January 3, 1955
- Leader: Charles A. Halleck
- Preceded by: Percy Priest
- Succeeded by: Carl Albert
- In office January 3, 1947 – January 3, 1949
- Leader: Charles A. Halleck
- Preceded by: John Sparkman
- Succeeded by: Percy Priest

Member of the U.S. House of Representatives from Illinois
- In office January 3, 1935 – December 31, 1974
- Preceded by: Frank Gillespie
- Succeeded by: Tim Lee Hall
- Constituency: 17th district (1935–1973); 15th district (1973–1974)

Personal details
- Born: Leslie Cornelius Arends; September 27, 1895 Melvin, Illinois, U.S.
- Died: July 17, 1985 (aged 89) Naples, Florida, U.S.
- Party: Republican
- Spouse: Betty Tychon
- Children: 1
- Profession: Farmer; Banker

Leslie Cornelius Arends (September 27, 1895 – July 17, 1985) was an American politician who served in the United States House of Representatives from Illinois from 1935 until 1974. He was a member of the Republican Party.

A native and lifelong resident of Melvin, Illinois, Arends attended Oberlin College and served in the United States Navy during World War I. He was involved in farming and banking; in addition to renting out several farms he owned, he eventually became president of the local bank his father had started.

Arends was elected to the U.S. House in 1934. He served from 1935 until resigning on December 31, 1974. From 1943 until his retirement, Arends served as the Republican Whip, holding the post during periods of Republican majority (1947-1949, 1953–1955) and minority (1943-1947, 1949–1953, 1955–1974). In addition, Arends rose by seniority to become the ranking minority member of the House Armed Services Committee.

A party loyalist, Arends opposed much government spending, and provided strong support to the party's presidential candidates. He remained loyal to Richard M. Nixon during the Watergate scandal, and indicated that he would not vote to impeach Nixon.

After resigning from the House, Arends served on the President's Intelligence Advisory Board, and lived in retirement in Melvin, Washington, DC, and Naples, Florida. He died in Naples, and was buried in Melvin.

== Early life ==
Born in Melvin, Illinois, on September 27, 1895, Arends was the youngest of ten children (only seven lived to adulthood) born to George Teis Arends and Talea (née Weiss) Arends. His father was born in Peoria to parents who were both natives of Germany; his mother was born in Hanover, Germany.

Arends attended the local schools and from 1912 to 1913 was a student at Oberlin College in Ohio. He enlisted in the United States Navy during World War I, where he played in the Navy band at numerous war bond rallies. After his discharge he acquired and rented out several farms, and became active in banking. He eventually became president of the Commercial State Bank in Melvin, which had been founded by his father. He was a member of the Ford County Farm Bureau, and a member of the board of trustees of Illinois Wesleyan University, which awarded him the honorary degree of LL.D. in 1962.

== Congressional career ==
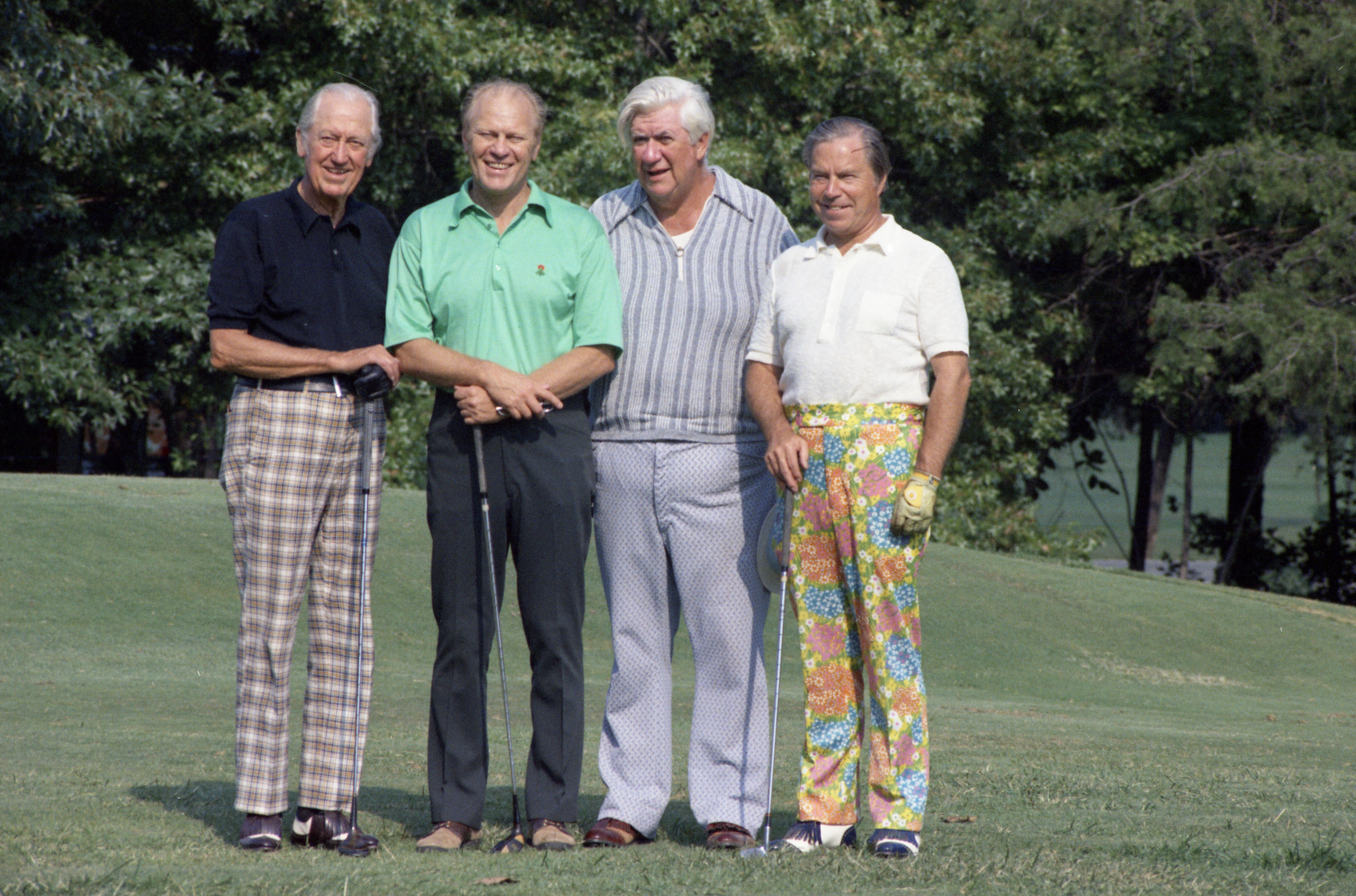
Arends with President Gerald Ford, John Rhodes, and Tip O'Neill at the third annual Congressional golf tournament at the Andrews Air Force Base Golf Course, September 1974

In 1934, Arends was elected to the 74th Congress. He was reelected nineteen times, and served from January 3, 1935, until resigning on December 31, 1974, a few days before the end of his final term. He alternately served as majority whip and minority whip for House Republicans from 1943 to 1974, and was the longest-serving whip in U.S. House of Representatives history. He rose through seniority to become the ranking Republican on the House Armed Services Committee, where one of his pet projects was preventing the closure of Chanute Air Force Base in Illinois; it remained open until 1993.

Arends represented a heavily Republican, largely rural downstate Illinois district. Conservative but pragmatic, he opposed much of the New Deal and remained a staunch isolationist until America entered World War II. After becoming minority whip in 1943, Arends helped create the powerful Conservative Coalition of Republicans and Southern Democrats who controlled the domestic agenda from 1937 to 1964. He was reelected as whip amid Republican in-fighting following their large Congressional losses in the 1964 elections; after their setback, House Republicans replaced leader Charles Halleck with Gerald Ford. Ford backed Peter Frelinghuysen Jr. for Whip. Arends had usually been reelected Whip without opposition, and despite a strong challenge from Frelinghuysen relied on personal relationships forged over thirty years to provide the votes that enabled him to retain the post.

He supported Robert A. Taft over Dwight D. Eisenhower for the 1952 Republican presidential nomination, and was an early supporter of the party's nominees Richard M. Nixon and Barry Goldwater in the campaigns of the 1960s. He organized the GOP opposition to Lyndon B. Johnson's Great Society. Arends voted in favor of the Civil Rights Acts of 1957, 1964, and 1968, and the Voting Rights Act of 1965, while Arends did not vote on the Civil Rights Act of 1960 and voted present on the 24th Amendment to the U.S. Constitution. During the Watergate scandal, Arends provided unwavering loyalty to President Richard M. Nixon, and said he would not vote for impeachment, citing his strong personal friendship with Nixon and belief that Nixon had performed capably as president. Despite the Whip challenge following the 1966 elections, Nixon's successor Gerald Ford and Arends maintained a close personal friendship, ensuring Arends a good relationship with the White House after Nixon's resignation.

== Post-Congressional career ==
After leaving Congress, Arends served on the President's Intelligence Advisory Board, and spent time at homes in Melvin, Naples, Florida, and Washington, DC.

=== Legacy ===
Arends's papers are part of the collections of Illinois Wesleyan University, and the university library's special collections room was named for him.

== Death and burial ==
Arends died in Naples on July 17, 1985, and was buried at Melvin Cemetery in Melvin. He was survived by his wife Betty (Tychon) and daughter Leslie ("Letty").

== Sources ==
=== Newspapers ===
- Lane, Russell (July 12, 1952). "Illinois GOP leaders Set to Back Ike". Decatur Daily Review. Decatur, IL. Associated Press.
- "Nixon to Attend Melvin Celebration". The Pantagraph. Bloomington, IL. May 5, 1960.
- "Arends Lashes Out Against Johnson as 'Wheeler Dealer': 'Unqualified' Support for Barry". The Pantagraph. Bloomington, IL. October 9, 1964.
- McNeil, Marshall (December 1, 1965). "Guns-Vs.-Butter Issue:G.O.P. Girds for New War on U.S. Spending". Pittsburgh Press. Pittsburgh, PA. Scripps-Howard.
- Beckman, Aldo (October 29, 1967). "Arends: Vote-Finder for Republicans in the House". Chicago Tribune. Chicago, IL.
- "Arends On Committee Informing Nixon On Issues". Freeport Journal-Standard. Freeport, IL. Associated Press. July 20, 1968.
- "House Whip Arends Won't Support Impeachment Vote". Southern Illinoisan. Carbondale, IL. Associated Press. August 8, 1974.
- Spencer, Sandy (February 20, 1975). "Founders' Day Sees 2 Renamings". The Pantagraph. Bloomington, IL.
- Pearson, Richard (July 17, 1985). "Leslie C. Arends, 89, Dies". Washington Post. Washington, DC.
- Cook, Joan (July 17, 1985). "Leslie Arends, 40-Year House Member, Dies". New York Times. New York, NY.

=== Books ===
- Illinois State Historical Society (1991). Journal of the Illinois State Historical Society. Vol. 84–85. Springfield, IL: ISHS.
- Schraufnagel, Scot (2011). Historical Dictionary of the U.S. Congress. Lanham, MD: Scarecrow Press. ISBN 978-0-8108-7196-0.
- United States Congress (2005). Biographical Directory of the United States Congress, 1774-2005. Washington, DC: US Government Printing Office. ISBN 9780160731761.
- University of Illinois (1913). Alumni Record of the University of Illinois. Champaign, IL: University of Illinois Press. p. 514.

=== Internet ===
- Ford, Gerald R. (October 24, 1974). "Remarks at Ceremonies Honoring Representative Leslie C. Arends in Melvin, Illinois". The American Presidency Project: Gerald Ford. Gerhard Peters and John T. Woolley.

U.S. House of Representatives
Preceded by J. Frank Gillespie	Member of the U.S. House of Representatives from Illinois's 17th congressional district January 3, 1935 – January 3, 1973	Succeeded by George M. O'Brien
Preceded by Cliffard D. Carlson	Member of the U.S. House of Representatives from Illinois's 15th congressional district January 3, 1973 – December 31, 1974	Succeeded by Tim Lee Hall
Party political offices
Preceded by Harry L. Englebright	Republican Whip of the U.S. House of Representatives; May 13, 1943 – December 31, 1974	Succeeded by Bob Michel
Preceded by Harry L. Englebright	Minority Whip of the U.S. House of Representatives; May 13, 1943 – January 3, 1947	Succeeded by John W. McCormack
Preceded by John Sparkman	Majority Whip of the U.S. House of Representatives; January 3, 1947 – January 3, 1949	Succeeded by Percy Priest
Preceded by John W. McCormack	Minority Whip of the U.S. House of Representatives; January 3, 1949 – January 3, 1953	Succeeded by John W. McCormack
Preceded by Percy Priest	Majority Whip of the U.S. House of Representatives; January 3, 1953 – January 3, 1955	Succeeded by Carl Albert
Preceded by John W. McCormack	Minority Whip of the U.S. House of Representatives; January 3, 1955 – December 31, 1974	Succeeded by Robert H. Michel
