= Richard Dowse (priest) =

Richard Dowse was Dean of Clonmacnoise from 1892 to 1900.

Dowse was born in County Wicklow and educated at Trinity College, Dublin and ordained in 1850. After a curacy in Collinstown he held incumbencies at Clonfad and Castletown. He was also Rural Dean of Mullingar before his appointment to the deanery.
