= Viscount Guillamore =

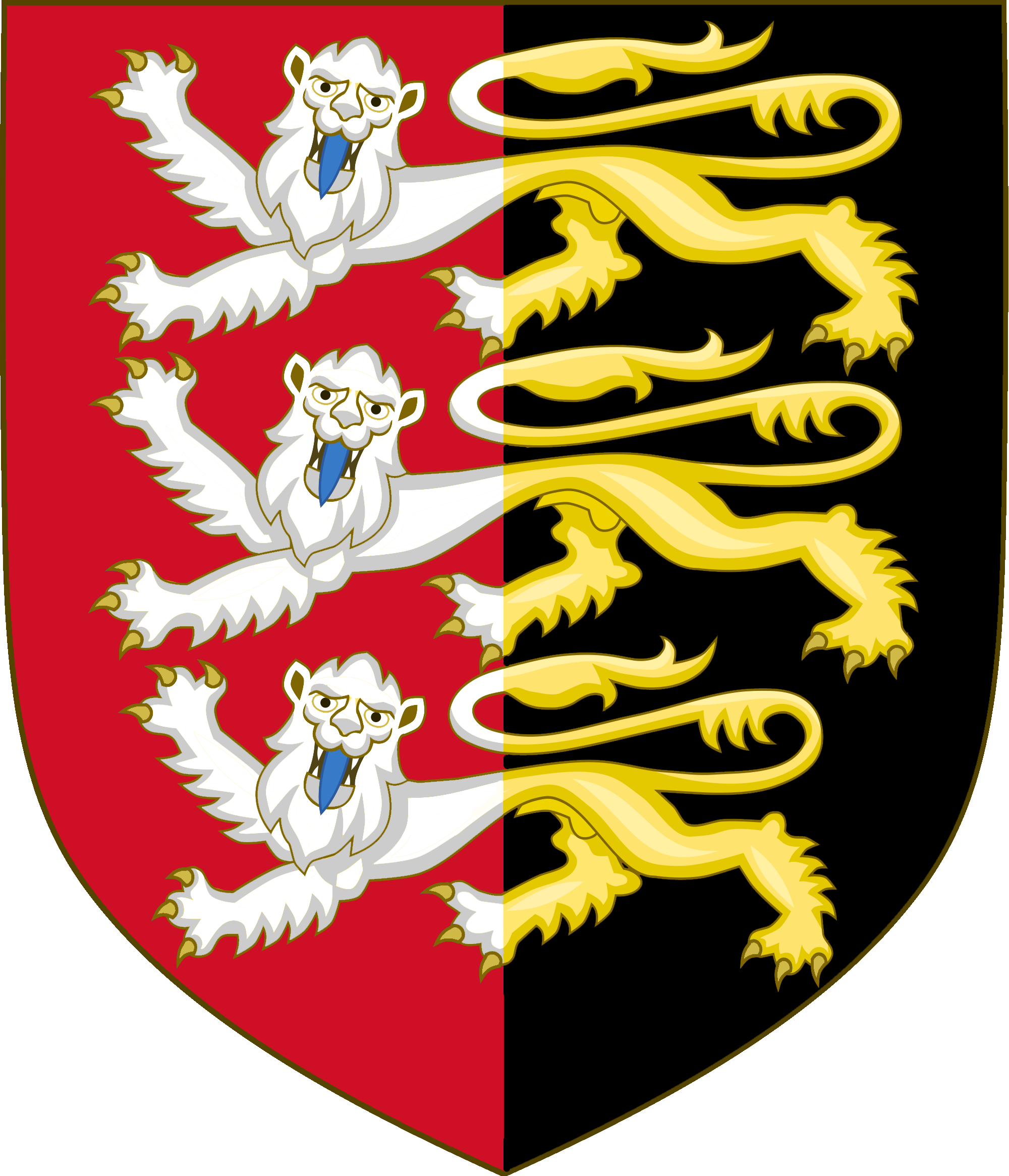
Arms of O'Grady: Per pale gules and sable, three lions passant guardant in pale per pale argent and or

Viscount Guillamore, of Caher Guillamore in the County of Limerick, was a title in the Peerage of Ireland. It was created on 28 January 1831 for Standish O'Grady, Attorney-General for Ireland and Lord Chief Baron of the Exchequer for Ireland. He was made Baron O'Grady, of Rockbarton in the County of Limerick, at the same time, also in the Peerage of Ireland. His son, the second Viscount, fought at the Battle of Waterloo and represented County Limerick in Parliament. Four of his sons, the third, fourth, fifth and sixth Viscounts, all succeeded in the peerages. The sixth Viscount was succeeded by his first cousin once removed, the seventh Viscount. He was the grandson of the Honourable Waller O'Grady, QC, younger son of the first Viscount. He died childless and was succeeded by his first cousin, the eighth Viscount. He was the son of James Waller O'Grady, younger son of the Honourable Waller O'Grady. Lord Guillamore died unmarried and was succeeded by his younger brother, the ninth Viscount. The titles went unclaimed on his death in 1955.

Several other members of the O'Grady family have gained distinction. Hayes O'Grady (died 1864), brother of the first Viscount, was an Admiral in the Royal Navy. His son was the antiquarian Standish Hayes O'Grady. The author, journalist and historian Standish James O'Grady was the grandson of John O'Grady, brother of the first Viscount.

== Viscounts Guillamore (1831) ==
- Standish O'Grady, 1st Viscount Guillamore (1766–1840)
- Standish Darby O'Grady, 2nd Viscount Guillamore (1792–1848)
- Standish O'Grady, 3rd Viscount Guillamore (1832–1860)
- Paget Standish O'Grady, 4th Viscount Guillamore (1835–1877)
- Hardress Standish O'Grady, 5th Viscount Guillamore (1841–1918)
- Frederick Standish O'Grady, 6th Viscount Guillamore (1847–1927)
- Hugh Hamon Massy O'Grady, 7th Viscount Guillamore (1860–1930)
- Richard O'Grady, 8th Viscount Guillamore (1867–1943)
- Standish Bruce O'Grady, 9th Viscount Guillamore (1869–1955)

== See also ==
- O'Grady family
