= Francis Browne (priest, died 1797) =

Irish Anglican priest

Francis Browne, LL.D. was an Anglican priest in Ireland in the late eighteenth century.

Browne was born in Dublin educated at Trinity College there. He was Archdeacon of Kilmacduagh from 1791 to 1794 and Dean of Elphin from then until his death in 1797.
