= John Barrett (dean of Clonmacnoise) =

John Alan Gardiner Barrett (1929–1996) was Dean of Clonmacnoise from 1989 until 1996.

Barrett was educated at Trinity College, Dublin. He was ordained in 1959. After a curacy at Bray he held incumbencies at Enniskeen, Navan, and Rathdrum before his time as Dean.
