= Yani Stevenheydens =

Belgian racing driver (born 2006)

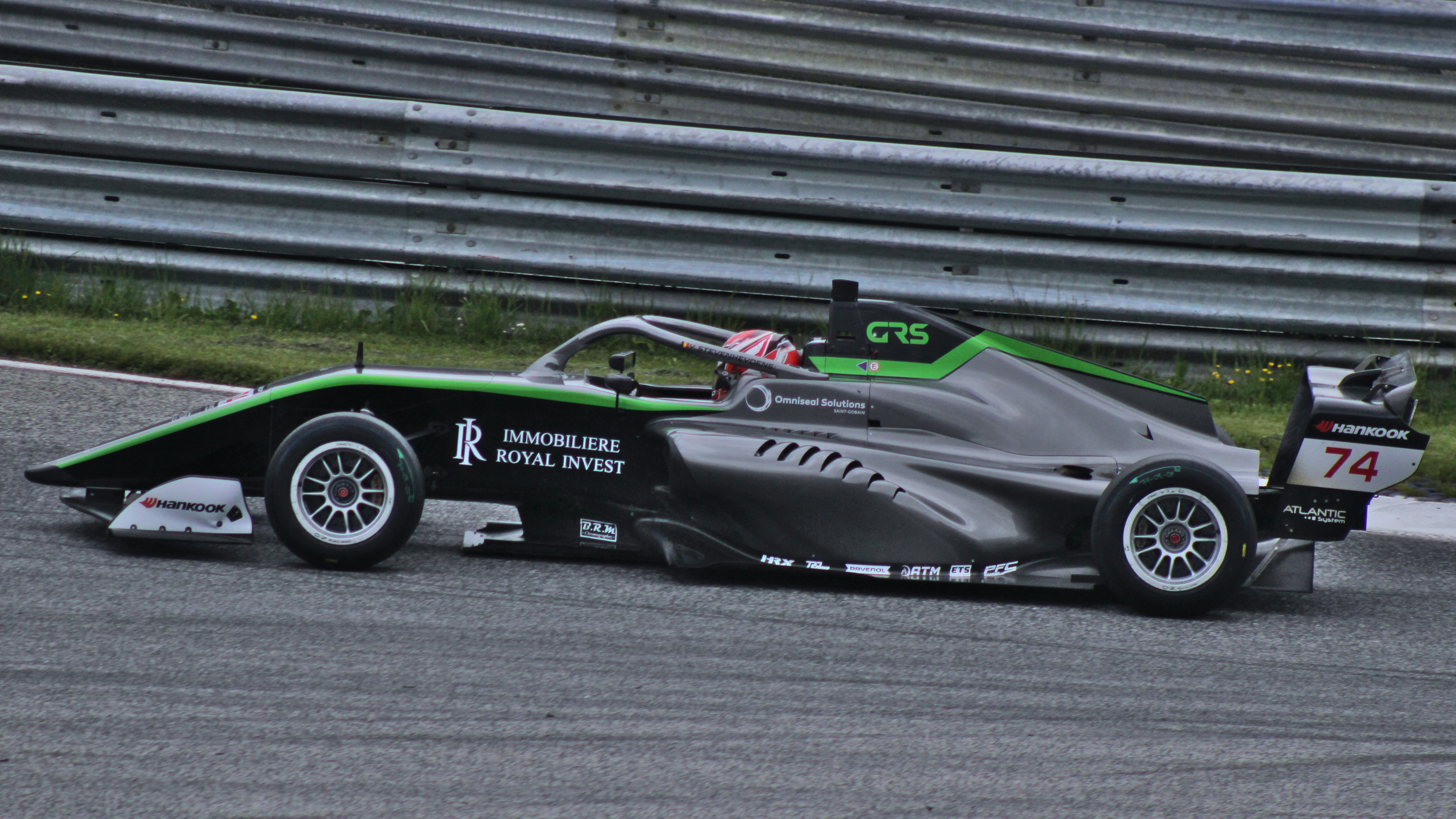
- Stevenheydens driving at the Red Bull Ring during the 2025 Eurocup-3 season
- Nationality: (Belgium) Belgian
- Born: 22 February 2006 (age 20) Mechelen, Belgium

GT4 European Series career
- Debut season: 2026
- Current team: Elite Motorsport with Entire Racing Engineering
- Car number: 77
- Starts: 6
- Wins: 0
- Podiums: 1
- Poles: 0
- Fastest laps: 0
- Best finish: TBD in 2026

Previous series
- 2025–2026 2025 2025–2026 2025 2023–2024: F4 Spanish; Eurocup-3; Eurocup-3 Winter; Eurocup-4 Winter; French F4

Yani Stevenheydens (born 22 February 2006) is a Belgian racing driver who competes in the GT4 European Series for Elite Motorsport.

Stevenheydens was the 2024 French F4 runner-up.

== Early career ==
=== Karting ===
Stevenheydens started karting on his eighth birthday party, which was held at a karting track, close to where his parents took him for swimming events. After starting in indoor rental karting, in 2016, he progressed in the 60 Mini category of multiple WSK Promotion championships in Italy, He stepped up to IAME competition the following year, where he saw the most success, coming third in the 2019 IAME Series Benelux – X30 Junior and winning the title a year later. Stevenheydens moved up to the X30 Senior class from 2021 and came runner-up to the 2022 IAME Warriors Final in his final year of karting.

=== Formula 4 ===
==== 2023 ====
After winning the IAME series shootout, Stevenheydens was announced to be making his single-seater debut in the French F4 Championship. In only his second race in Nogaro, he was able to take his first podium with third place. This was followed by a double rostrum at the Pau Grand Prix. His first win of the campaign came during the penultimate round in Lédenon having defended against Hiyu Yamakoshi for the win. Stevenheydens would triumph once again during the season finale at the Circuit Paul Ricard, placing him seventh in the standings with 107 points.

==== 2024 ====
Stevenheydens remained in French F4 for 2024. He started the season with two poles in Nogaro, and took a lights-to-flag victory during the first race. More podiums and a double pole in Spa-Francorchamps followed, before he dominated the Nürburgring with a double victory, putting him into the lead of the standings. He duelled with title rival Jules Caranta in the second Magny-Cours race, taking two pole positions and converting one to his fifth win the next day with a dominant performance. However, a double win in Dijon-Prenois for rival Taito Kato reduced Stevenheydens' points lead to a mere six points. A second and third place podium in the Paul Ricard final round meant that Stevenheydens initially clinched the title, but a post-race penalty for him in the final race dropped him behind Kato in the standings, forcing him Stevenheydens to settle as runner-up behind Kato by six points.

==== 2025 ====
Due to budget constraints his campaign in Eurocup-3 in 2025 was uncertain after a successful 2024 season. Originally he was set to compete in a third F4 season, moving over to the F4 Spanish Championship with MP Motorsport, but only competed in the Eurocup-4 Spanish Winter Championship with them, taking one win in the sprint race at Navarra. He did contest one round of F4 Spain as a guest driver replacing Daniel Dallakyan in the penultimate round at Circuit Ricardo Tormo for GRS Team, getting a highest result of fifteenth in the final race.

==== 2026 ====
Stevenheydens returned to F4 Spain in a one-off at Motorland Aragón for GRS Team to replace an injured Pablo Riccobono Bello. He also replaced an injured Emmilio Valentino del Grosso at Elite Motorsport in the penultimate round of the GB4 Championship at Donington Park, marking his debut in the series. Stevenheydens took a double pole, and converted them to a third and first, respectively.

=== Eurocup-3 ===
==== 2025 ====
Despite earlier announcements that he would not be competing in the 2025 Eurocup-3 season, GRS Team announced in May 2025 that Stevenheydens would be racing for them. He joined the same team for the final round of the Eurocup-3 Spanish Winter Championship. In his Eurocup-3 campaign, he took double points finishes on his debut at the Red Bull Ring. After being away from the championship since round two in Portimão, where he took a ninth in the first round, he would return in the final round in Barcelona and took an eighth in the first round.

==== 2026 ====
With GRS Team, he contested the entirety of the Eurocup-3 Spanish Winter Championship, getting a best result of fifth in the first round at Portimão. He also participated in the third round of the main series at Imola Circuit with the same team.

== Sportscar career ==
=== 2026 ===
Stevenheydens made the switch to sportscar racing in 2026, competing in the GT4 European Series for Elite Motorsport with Entire Racing Engineering. His first podium came in the third round at his home circuit in Circuit de Spa-Francorchamps. He took a second podium in the penultimate round at Circuit Zandvoort.

== Karting record ==
=== Karting career summary ===
Season	Series	Team	Position
2016	WSK Final Cup – 60 Mini	Eyckmans GP	55th
2016	WSK Super Master Series – 60 Mini	Eyckmans GP	
2016	WSK Champions Cup – 60 Mini	Eyckmans GP	51st
2017	WSK Champions Cup – 60 Mini	Eyckmans GP	95th
2017	KNAF Cup IAME Benelux Open – X30 Mini	Eyckmans GP	27th
2017	KNAF Cup IAME Benelux Open – X30 Cadet		16th
2019	IAME Series Benelux – X30 Junior		3rd
2019	IAME International Games – X30 Junior		31st
2020	IAME Series Benelux – X30 Junior		1st
2020	IAME Euro Series – X30 Junior	Eurokarting	7th
2021	IAME Euro Series – X30 Senior	Eurokarting	23rd
2021	IAME Warriors Final – X30 Senior	Eurokarting	10th
2022	IAME Euro Series – X30 Senior	Euro Karting	10th
2022	IAME Warriors Final – X30 Senior	Eurokarting	2nd
2022	IAME Series Benelux – X30 Senior		4th

== Racing record ==
=== Racing career summary ===
Season	Series	Team	Races	Wins	Poles	F/Laps	Podiums	Points	Position
2023	French F4 Championship	FFSA Academy	21	2	0	1	5	107	7th
2024	French F4 Championship	FFSA Academy	20	4	8	6	12	274	**2nd**
2025	Eurocup-4 Spanish Winter Championship	MP Motorsport	9	1	0	1	1	27	13th
2025	Eurocup-3 Spanish Winter Championship	GRS Team	2	0	0	0	0	0	NC†
2025	Eurocup-3	GRS Team	7	0	0	0	0	16	16th
2025	F4 Spanish Championship	GRS Team	3	0	0	0	0	0	NC†
2026	Eurocup-3 Spanish Winter Championship	GRS Team	9	0	0	0	0	15	14th
2026	F4 Spanish Championship	GRS Team	3	0	0	0	0	0	32nd
2026	Eurocup-3	GRS Team	3	0	0	0	0	0	44th
2026	GT4 European Series - Silver	Elite Motorsport with Entire Racing Engineering	6	0	0	0	1	25	13th*
2026	GB4 Championship	Elite Motorsport	3	1	2	2	2	75	22nd

* Season still in progress.
† As Stevenheydens was a guest driver, he was ineligible for points.

=== Complete French F4 Championship results ===
(key) (Races in bold indicate pole position; races in italics indicate fastest lap)

Year	1	2	3	4	5	6	7	8	9	10	11	12	13	14	15	16	17	18	19	20	21	DC	Points
2023	NOG; 1; 10	NOG; 2; 3	NOG; 3 Ret	MAG; 1; 18	MAG; 2; 5	MAG; 3; 6	PAU; 1; 4	PAU; 2; 3	PAU; 3; 3	SPA; 1; 11	SPA; 2; 6	SPA; 3; 14	MIS; 1; 9	MIS; 2 Ret	MIS; 3; 19	LÉD; 1; 8	LÉD; 2; 1	LÉD; 3 Ret	LEC; 1; 8	LEC; 2; 1	LEC; 3; 22	7th	107
2024	**NOG**; **1**; 1	NOG; 2 C	**NOG**; **3**; 7	LÉD; 1; 3	LÉD; 2; 2	LÉD; 3; 4	**SPA**; **1**; 3	SPA; 2; 4	**SPA**; **3**; 2	NÜR; 1; 5	NÜR; 2; 1	**NÜR**; **3**; 1	**MAG**; **1**; 2	MAG; 2; 17	**MAG**; **3**; 1	DIJ; 1; 2	DIJ; 2 Ret	DIJ; 3; 2	**LEC**; **1**; 2	LEC; 2; 7	LEC; 3; 11	2nd	274

=== Complete Eurocup-4 Spanish Winter Championship results ===
(key) (Races in bold indicate pole position) (Races in italics indicate fastest lap)

Year	Team	1	2	3	4	5	6	7	8	9	DC	Points
2025	MP Motorsport	JER; 1; 20	JER; 2; 8	JER; 3; 8	POR; 1 Ret	POR; 2; 8	POR; 3; 29	NAV; 1; 13	NAV; 2; 1	NAV; 3; 15	13th	27

=== Complete Eurocup-3 Spanish Winter Championship results ===
(key) (Races in bold indicate pole position) (Races in italics indicate fastest lap)

Year	Team	1	2	3	4	5	6	7	8	9	DC	Points
2025	GRS Team	JER; 1	JER; 2	JER; 3	POR; 1	POR; 2	POR; 3	ARA; 1; 17	ARA; 2; 11		NC†	0
2026	GRS Team	POR; 1; 7	POR; 2; 5	POR; 3; 16	JAR; 1; 14	JAR; 2; 10	JAR; 3; 9	ARA; 3 Ret	ARA; 2; 16	ARA; 3 Ret	14th	15

† As Stevenheydens was a guest driver, he was ineligible for points.

* Season still in progress.

=== Complete Eurocup-3 results ===
(key) (Races in bold indicate pole position) (Races in italics indicate fastest lap)

Year	Team	1	2	3	4	5	6	7	8	9	10	11	12	13	14	15	16	17	18	19	DC	Points
2025	GRS Team	RBR; 1; 7	RBR; 2; 9	POR; 1; 9	POR; SR; 12	POR; 2; 13	LEC; 1 WD	LEC; SR; WD	LEC; 2 WD	MNZ; 1	MNZ; 2	ASS; 1	ASS; 2	SPA; 1	SPA; 2	JER; 1	JER; 2	CAT; 1; 8	CAT; 2; 11		16th	16
2026	GRS Team	LEC; 1	LEC; SR	LEC; 2	POR; 1	POR; 2	IMO; 1 Ret	IMO; SR; 20	IMO; 2 Ret	MNZ; 1	MNZ; 2	SIL; 1	SIL; 2	JER; 1	JER; SR	JER; 2	HUN; 1	HUN; 2	CAT; 1	CAT; 2	44th	0

=== Complete F4 Spanish Championship results ===
(key) (Races in bold indicate pole position; races in italics indicate fastest lap)

Year	Entrant	1	2	3	4	5	6	7	8	9	10	11	12	13	14	15	16	17	18	19	20	21	Pos	Points
2025	GRS Team	ARA; 1	ARA; 2	ARA; 3	NAV; 1	NAV; 2	NAV; 3	POR; 1	POR; 2	POR; 3	LEC; 1	LEC; 2	LEC; 3	JER; 1	JER; 2	JER; 3	CRT; 1 Ret	CRT; 2; 17	CRT; 3; 15	CAT; 1	CAT; 2	CAT; 3	NC†	0
2026	GRS Team	CRT; 1	CRT; 2	CRT; 3	POR; 1	POR; 2	POR; 3	ARA; 1; 18	ARA; 2; 17	ARA; 3; 14	JAR; 1	JAR; 2	JAR; 3	JER; 1	JER; 2	JER; 3	NAV; 1	NAV; 2	NAV; 3	CAT; 1	CAT; 2	CAT; 3	32nd	0

† As Stevenheydens was a guest driver, he was ineligible for points.

* Season still in progress.

=== Complete GT4 European Series results ===
(key) (Races in bold indicate pole position) (Races in italics indicate fastest lap)

Year	Team	Car	Class	1	2	3	4	5	6	7	8	9	10	11	12	Pos	Points
2026	Elite Motorsport with Entire Race Engineering	McLaren Artura GT4	Silver	LEC; 1; 7	LEC; 2; 36	MNZ; 1; 10	MNZ; 2; 24	SPA; 1; 3	SPA; 2; 13	MIS; 1; 5	MIS; 2; 27	ZAN; 1; 3	ZAN; 2; 27	ALG; 1 2	ALG; 2; 11	11th*	50*

^{*} Season still in progress.
