= William Darby (priest) =

Irish Anglican priest

William Darby (died 1791) was an Anglican Archdeacon in Ireland in the late 18th century.

Darby was educated at Trinity College Dublin. He was Sacrist of Clonfert Cathedral and also Archdeacon of Kilmacduagh from 1788 until his death in 1791.
