= 2026 GB4 Championship =

British motor racing championship

The 2026 GB4 Championship partnered by the BRDC was the fifth season of a motor racing championship for open wheel, formula racing cars in Britain. The 2026 season, which is organised by MotorSport Vision, was ran over seven triple-header rounds. The season was proceeded by a first-ever winter series for the championship, simply named the GB4 Winter Series.

GB4 acts as a direct feeder series to higher open-wheel categories, including the existing GB3 Championship partnered by the BRDC. GB4 runs primarily on the same British GT race programme as GB3, and retains many of the same championship partners.

== Main series ==
=== Teams and drivers ===
Team	No.	Driver	Rounds
(United Kingdom) KMR Sport	3	(Republic of Ireland) Alex O'Grady	All
(United Kingdom) KMR Sport	15	(United Kingdom) Lily-May Watkins	All
(United Kingdom) KMR Sport	23	(United Kingdom) Holly Miall	All
(United Kingdom) Idola Motorsport	4	(United Kingdom) Jamie Leverton	1–2
(United Kingdom) Nitrous Competitions ADM Racing	4	(United Kingdom) Jamie Leverton	3–7
(United Kingdom) Nitrous Competitions ADM Racing	35	(United States) Caitlyn McDaniel	All
(United Kingdom) Nitrous Competitions ADM Racing	42	(United Kingdom) Luke Hilton	1–4
(United Kingdom) Elite Motorsport	5	(Venezuela) Emmilio Valentino del Grosso	All (Note: Del Grosso was entered into Round 6 at Donington Park, but withdrew on medical grounds.)
(United Kingdom) Elite Motorsport	5	(Belgium) Yani Stevenheydens	6
(United Kingdom) Elite Motorsport	51	(United Kingdom) Fred Green	All
(United Kingdom) Elite Motorsport	77	(Israel) Matan Achituv	All
(United Kingdom) Hillspeed	6	(United States) Demitri Nolan	All
(United Kingdom) Hillspeed	7	(Sweden) Enzo Hallman	All
(United Kingdom) Hillspeed	99	(United States) Connor Willis	All
(United Kingdom) Fortec Motorsports	8	(United Kingdom) Thomas Ingram Hill	All
(United Kingdom) Fortec Motorsports	11	(Poland) Franciszek Cegielski	All
(United Kingdom) Fortec Motorsports	88	(United States) Jordyn Martin	All
(United Kingdom) Scorpio Motorsport	9	(France) Romuald Bocquet	All
(United Kingdom) Scorpio Motorsport	10	(Saudi Arabia) Faris Organji	4–7
(United Kingdom) Scorpio Motorsport	87	(United Kingdom) Archie Davies	1–6
(United Kingdom) Pace Performance	17	(South Korea) John O'Donnell	All
(United Kingdom) Pace Performance	18	(United Kingdom) Torrin Byrne	All
(United Kingdom) Pace Performance	76	(United Kingdom) Josh McLean	All
(United Kingdom) Arden Motorsport	22	(United Kingdom) Charlie Myers	1–2
(United Kingdom) Arden Motorsport	22	(United States) William Rohan	4
(United Kingdom) Arden Motorsport	22	(United States) Yana Kapoor	6
(United Kingdom) Arden Motorsport	24	(Singapore) Michael Koh	All
(United Kingdom) Arden Motorsport	95	(France) Solenn Amrouche	All
(United Kingdom) Douglas Motorsport	26	(Republic of Ireland) Jason Smyth	1–3
(United Kingdom) Douglas Motorsport	28	(United Kingdom) Dayton Coulthard	All
(United Kingdom) Douglas Motorsport	54	(Republic of Ireland) Conor Grant	All
(United Kingdom) Fox Motorsport	33	(Saudi Arabia) Jasser Iskander	1–6
(United Kingdom) Fox Motorsport	36	(South Africa) Enzo Rujugiro	All
(United Kingdom) Fox Motorsport	48	(United Kingdom) Archie Bullard	1–6

=== Race calendar ===
Round		Circuit	Date	Pole position	Fastest lap	Winning driver	Winning team
1	R1	Silverstone Circuit (Grand Prix Circuit, Northamptonshire)	25 April	(United Kingdom) Fred Green	(United Kingdom) Fred Green	(United Kingdom) Fred Green	(United Kingdom) Elite Motorsport
1	R2	Silverstone Circuit (Grand Prix Circuit, Northamptonshire)	26 April	(United Kingdom) Fred Green	(United Kingdom) Fred Green	(United Kingdom) Fred Green	(United Kingdom) Elite Motorsport
1	R3	Silverstone Circuit (Grand Prix Circuit, Northamptonshire)	26 April		(France) Romuald Bocquet	(United Kingdom) Dayton Coulthard (Note: Romuald Bocquet was the first driver to cross the finish line, but received a 10-second time penalty for a false start. Dayton Coulthard, who was the second driver to cross the finish line, thus inherited the win.)	(United Kingdom) Douglas Motorsport
2	R4	Oulton Park (International Circuit, Cheshire)	23 May	(United Kingdom) Fred Green	(Republic of Ireland) Alex O'Grady	(United Kingdom) Fred Green	(United Kingdom) Elite Motorsport
2	R5	Oulton Park (International Circuit, Cheshire)	25 May	(Republic of Ireland) Alex O'Grady	(Republic of Ireland) Alex O'Grady	(Republic of Ireland) Alex O'Grady	(United Kingdom) KMR Sport
2	R6	Oulton Park (International Circuit, Cheshire)	25 May		(Venezuela) Emmilio Valentino del Grosso	(United Kingdom) Josh McLean	(United Kingdom) Pace Performance
3	R7	Donington Park (Grand Prix Circuit, Leicestershire)	27 June	(United Kingdom) Luke Hilton	(Sweden) Enzo Hallman	(United Kingdom) Luke Hilton	(United Kingdom) Nitrous Competitions ADM Racing
3	R8	Donington Park (Grand Prix Circuit, Leicestershire)	28 June	(United States) Demitri Nolan	(United Kingdom) Luke Hilton	(United Kingdom) Dayton Coulthard	(United Kingdom) Douglas Motorsport
3	R9	Donington Park (Grand Prix Circuit, Leicestershire)	28 June		(Sweden) Enzo Hallman	(United Kingdom) Josh McLean	(United Kingdom) Pace Performance
4	R10	Silverstone Circuit (Grand Prix Circuit, Northamptonshire)	1 August	(United Kingdom) Thomas Ingram Hill	(United Kingdom) Thomas Ingram Hill	(United Kingdom) Luke Hilton	(United Kingdom) Nitrous Competitions ADM Racing
4	R11	Silverstone Circuit (Grand Prix Circuit, Northamptonshire)	2 August	(United Kingdom) Fred Green	(United Kingdom) Thomas Ingram Hill	(United Kingdom) Thomas Ingram Hill	(United Kingdom) Fortec Motorsports
4	R12	Silverstone Circuit (Grand Prix Circuit, Northamptonshire)	2 August		(United Kingdom) Thomas Ingram Hill	(United States) Connor Willis	(United Kingdom) Hillspeed
5	R13	Snetterton Circuit (300 Circuit, Norfolk)	15 August	(United Kingdom) Fred Green	(Republic of Ireland) Alex O'Grady	(Republic of Ireland) Alex O'Grady	(United Kingdom) KMR Sport
5	R14	Snetterton Circuit (300 Circuit, Norfolk)	16 August	(Republic of Ireland) Alex O'Grady	(Republic of Ireland) Alex O'Grady	(Republic of Ireland) Alex O'Grady	(United Kingdom) KMR Sport
5	R15	Snetterton Circuit (300 Circuit, Norfolk)	16 August		(Sweden) Enzo Hallman	(United Kingdom) Josh McLean	(United Kingdom) Pace Performance
6	R16	Donington Park (Grand Prix Circuit, Leicestershire)	5 September	(Belgium) Yani Stevenheydens	(Belgium) Yani Stevenheydens	(United Kingdom) Fred Green	(United Kingdom) Elite Motorsport
6	R17	Donington Park (Grand Prix Circuit, Leicestershire)	6 September	(Belgium) Yani Stevenheydens	(United Kingdom) Fred Green	(Belgium) Yani Stevenheydens	(United Kingdom) Elite Motorsport
6	R18	Donington Park (Grand Prix Circuit, Leicestershire)	6 September		(Belgium) Yani Stevenheydens	(United Kingdom) Josh McLean	(United Kingdom) Pace Performance
7	R19	Brands Hatch (Grand Prix Circuit, Kent)	26 September	(United Kingdom) Fred Green	(United Kingdom) Fred Green	(United Kingdom) Fred Green	(United Kingdom) Elite Motorsport
7	R20	Brands Hatch (Grand Prix Circuit, Kent)	27 September	(United Kingdom) Fred Green	(United Kingdom) Fred Green	(United Kingdom) Fred Green	(United Kingdom) Elite Motorsport
7	R21	Brands Hatch (Grand Prix Circuit, Kent)	27 September		(United Kingdom) Fred Green	(Singapore) Michael Koh	(United Kingdom) Arden Motorsport

=== Championship standings ===
Scoring system

Points were awarded to the top 20 classified finishers in races one and two, as follows:

Position	**1st**	**2nd**	**3rd**	**4th**	**5th**	**6th**	**7th**	**8th**	**9th**	**10th**	**11th**	**12th**	**13th**	**14th**	**15th**	**16th**	**17th**	**18th**	**19th**	**20th**
Points	35	29	24	21	19	17	15	13	12	11	10	9	8	7	6	5	4	3	2	1

The third race, which has its grid formed by reversing the top twelve from the qualifying order, awarded points for finishers in the top 15, as shown below. It also awarded extra points for positions gained from the drivers' respective starting positions.

Position	**1st**	**2nd**	**3rd**	**4th**	**5th**	**6th**	**7th**	**8th**	**9th**	**10th**	**11th**	**12th**	**13th**	**14th**	**15th**
Points	20	17	15	13	11	10	9	8	7	6	5	4	3	2	1

==== Drivers' Championship ====
Pos	Driver	SIL1			OUL			DON1			SIL2			SNE			DON2			BRH			Pts
Pos	Driver	R1	R2	R3	R4	R5	R6	R7	R8	R9	R10	R11	R12	R13	R14	R15	R16	R17	R18	R19	R20	R21	Pts
1	(Republic of Ireland) Alex O'Grady	3	5	7^{4}	2	**1**	10^{1}	6	4	4^{6}	2	5	5^{4}	1	**1**	12	2	6	10	2	2	6^{4}	445
2	(United Kingdom) Fred Green	**1**	**1**	17	**1**	2	11^{1}	10	Ret	6^{12}	23	**2**	4^{7}	**Ret**	2	Ret	1	2	9^{2}	**1**	**1**	5^{7}	412
3	(Sweden) Enzo Hallman	7	2	5^{5}	3	3	6^{4}	8	11	5^{12}	11	12	16	10	8	2^{4}	4	3	12	4	4	4^{5}	341
4	(United Kingdom) Thomas Ingram Hill	4	4	Ret	4	4	5^{3}	11	Ret	13^{2}	**27**	1	3^{9}	4	3	6^{5}	6	5	8	3	3	7^{4}	338
5	(United Kingdom) Dayton Coulthard	6	18	1^{5}	11	Ret	2	3	1	Ret	6	9	6^{8}	3	4	4^{5}	5	7	4^{2}	7	DNS	8	313
6	(United Kingdom) Torrin Byrne	9	Ret	9^{4}	5	7	8	15	3	10^{10}	Ret	4	2^{3}	2	6	Ret	8	4	Ret	6	7	10	270
7	(United Kingdom) Josh McLean	12	9	10^{7}	13	Ret	1^{1}	5	Ret	1^{4}	4	7	22	8	11	1	7	Ret	1	15	14	18^{6}	239
8	(Poland) Franciszek Cegielski	15	21	14^{12}	8	8	9	2	9	9	7	6	10	5	12	Ret	15	10	7	8	5	9	232
9	(United States) Connor Willis	10	8	8	7	9	4	13	Ret	Ret	8	11	1	9	10	Ret	10	8	5	9	8	3	221
10	(Israel) Matan Achituv	14	6	2^{1}	6	6	Ret	21	5	Ret	10	10	7^{6}	15	13	7^{7}	13	18	11^{2}	11	12	2	216
11	(Venezuela) Emmilio Valentino del Grosso	2	Ret	23	9	11	3	12	7	Ret	5	8	Ret	6	9	3^{2}	WD	WD	WD	5	6	11	209
12	(United Kingdom) Luke Hilton	8	11	20^{8}	Ret	5	7^{2}	**1**	2	3^{6}	1	3	Ret										205
13	(Republic of Ireland) Conor Grant	20	10	12^{3}	16	12	14^{2}	Ret	6	Ret	3	Ret	DSQ	26	5	6^{2}	9	11	2^{2}	10	DNS	12	165
14	(South Korea) John O'Donnell	18	19	11^{12}	15	18	Ret	9	Ret	Ret	9	18	8^{7}	7	7	Ret	11	9	3	12	9	Ret	161
15	(Singapore) Michael Koh	27	12	13^{5}	18	16	Ret	Ret	Ret	8	13	13	14^{10}	16	14	10^{12}	14	Ret	15^{1}	14	10	1	138
16	(France) Romuald Bocquet	11	7	15	17	17	Ret	14	8	Ret	14	21	11^{7}	17	18	8^{12}	17	13	16^{2}	16	15	21	125
17	(United States) Demitri Nolan	Ret	20	Ret	14	20	16^{3}	4	**Ret**	2^{4}	18	20	20^{1}	20	15	14^{3}	Ret	12	13^{1}	13	11	16	102
18	(United States) Jordyn Martin	22	14	16	25	10	15^{2}	7	16	15	12	14	12^{4}	11	17	19	16	Ret	17	19	DSQ	14^{4}	93
19	(United Kingdom) Archie Davies	13	Ret	3^{2}	10	14	13^{1}	Ret	15	14^{7}	17	22	9	12	16	17	24	21	14^{1}				90
20	(Republic of Ireland) Jason Smyth	5	3	4^{3}	12	13	12^{1}	WD	WD	WD													81
21	(United Kingdom) Jamie Leverton	23	22	24	21	19	17^{7}	17	12	16^{9}	15	15	Ret	18	Ret	15^{3}	19	15	18^{2}	17	13	13^{1}	76
22	(Belgium) Yani Stevenheydens																**3**	**1**	6^{6}				75
23	(United States) Caitlyn McDaniel	17	16	19^{1}	23	25	18^{9}	16	14	17^{6}	20	Ret	18^{10}	24	23	20^{7}	26	20	22^{4}	20	18	20^{2}	66
24	(South Africa) Enzo Rujugiro	26	Ret	25^{2}	24	23	20^{9}	Ret	13	Ret	22	25	15^{12}	22	21	13^{12}	18	16	21^{3}	21	20	Ret	59
25	(United Kingdom) Archie Bullard	24	24	22	Ret	27	24	19	10	12^{1}	21	Ret	13^{12}	14	Ret	16^{3}	12	Ret	Ret				52
26	(Saudi Arabia) Jasser Iskander	21	17	18^{7}	Ret	21	21^{4}	Ret	Ret	7	19	24	DSQ	21	Ret	11^{12}	21	14	Ret				50
27	(United Kingdom) Lily-May Watkins	16	15	Ret	19	26	22	WD	WD	WD	16	17	17^{3}	13	Ret	9^{7}	20	Ret	19	23	Ret	19	48
28	(United Kingdom) Holly Miall	19	Ret	Ret	20	24	23^{3}	18	17	18^{8}	24	Ret	19^{6}	25	22	18^{7}	22	19	23	22	17	15^{4}	45
29	(France) Solenn Amrouche	25	23	21^{3}	22	22	19^{9}	20	Ret	11	26	23	21^{5}	19	20	Ret	Ret	Ret	20^{3}	Ret	19	22	31
30	(United Kingdom) Charlie Myers	Ret	13	6	26	15	Ret																24
31	(Saudi Arabia) Faris Organji										28	19	Ret	23	19	21	23	17	Ret	18	16	17^{4}	20
32	(United States) William Rohan										25	16	Ret										5
33	(United States) Yana Kapoor																25	22	24^{3}				3
Pos	Driver	R1	R2	R3	R4	R5	R6	R7	R8	R9	R10	R11	R12	R13	R14	R15	R16	R17	R18	R19	R20	R21	Pts
Pos	Driver	SIL1			OUL			DON1			SIL2			SNE			DON2			BRH			Pts

Colour	Result
Gold	Winner
Silver	Second place
Bronze	Third place
Green	Points classification
Blue	Non-points classification
Blue	Non-classified finish (NC)
Purple	Retired, not classified (Ret)
Red	Did not qualify (DNQ)
Red	Did not pre-qualify (DNPQ)
Black	Disqualified (DSQ)
White	Did not start (DNS)
White	Withdrew (WD)
White	Race cancelled (C)
Blank	Did not practice (DNP)
Blank	Did not arrive (DNA)
Blank	Excluded (EX)

**Bold** – Pole

Italics – Fastest Lap

== Winter series ==
=== Teams and drivers ===
Team	No.	Driver
(United Kingdom) Nitrous Competitions ADM Racing	4	(United Kingdom) Jamie Leverton
(United Kingdom) Nitrous Competitions ADM Racing	77	(United Kingdom) Archie Pearce
(United Kingdom) Pace Performance	6	(United States) William Rohan
(United Kingdom) Pace Performance	17	(South Africa) Gianna Pascoal
(United Kingdom) Pace Performance	46	(United Kingdom) Alexander de Benedittis
(United Kingdom) Douglas Motorsport	8	(Australia) George Proudford-Nalder
(United Kingdom) Douglas Motorsport	54	(Republic of Ireland) Conor Grant
(United Kingdom) Elite Motorsport	11	(United Kingdom) Henry Cameron
(United Kingdom) Elite Motorsport	20	(South Korea) John O’Donnell
(United Kingdom) Elite Motorsport	21	(United Kingdom) Harrison Mackie
(United Kingdom) Elite Motorsport	26	(United Kingdom) Jesse Phillips
(United Kingdom) Fox Motorsport	22	(United Kingdom) Rob Crawford
(United Kingdom) Fox Motorsport	33	(Saudi Arabia) Jasser Iskander
(United Kingdom) Fox Motorsport	48	(United Kingdom) Archie Bullard
(United Kingdom) KMR Sport	27	(United Kingdom) Toby Campbell
(United Kingdom) KMR Sport	44	(United Kingdom) Lewis Goff
(United Kingdom) KMR Sport	95	(France) Solenn Amrouche
(United Kingdom) Fortec Motorsports	71	(Indonesia) Qarrar Firhand
(United Kingdom) Fortec Motorsports	75	(United Kingdom) Max Yuill
(United Kingdom) R Racing	90	(United Kingdom) Chase Fernandez

=== Race calendar ===
Round	Circuit	Date	Pole position	Fastest lap	Winning driver	Winning team
R1	Snetterton Circuit	24 October	(Republic of Ireland) Conor Grant	(Australia) George Proudford-Nalder	(Republic of Ireland) Conor Grant	(United Kingdom) Douglas Motorsport
R2	Snetterton Circuit	24 October	(Australia) George Proudford-Nalder	(United Kingdom) Jesse Phillips	(United Kingdom) Jesse Phillips	(United Kingdom) Elite Motorsport
R3	Snetterton Circuit	25 October	(United Kingdom) Harrison Mackie	(United Kingdom) Harrison Mackie	(Australia) George Proudford-Nalder	(United Kingdom) Douglas Motorsport
R4	Snetterton Circuit	25 October	(United Kingdom) Harrison Mackie	(United Kingdom) Jesse Phillips	(United Kingdom) Jesse Phillips	(United Kingdom) Elite Motorsport

=== Championship standings ===
Scoring system

Points were awarded to the top 20 classified finishers as follows:

Position
Position	1st	2nd	3rd	4th	5th	6th	7th	8th	9th	10th	11th	12th	13th	14th	15th	16th	17th	18th	19th	20th
Points	35	29	24	21	19	17	15	13	12	11	10	9	8	7	6	5	4	3	2	1

==== Drivers' Championship ====
Pos	Driver	SNE				Pts
Pos	Driver	R1	R2	R3	R4	Pts
1	(United Kingdom) Jesse Phillips	3	1	8	1	107
2	(Australia) George Proudford-Nalder	2	4	1	4	105
3	(United Kingdom) Harrison Mackie	6	2	2	3	99
4	(Republic of Ireland) Conor Grant	1	10	5	6	82
5	(South Korea) John O'Donnell	4	3	6	7	77
6	(United Kingdom) Lewis Goff	5	7	4	5	74
7	(United Kingdom) Chase Fernandez	7	Ret	3	2	68
8	(Indonesia) Qarrar Firhand	10	6	9	8	53
9	(Saudi Arabia) Jasser Iskander	11	9	11	9	44
10	(United Kingdom) Archie Bullard	8	5	Ret	12	41
11	(United Kingdom) Jamie Leverton	9	13	7	Ret	35
12	(United States) William Rohan	12	8	17	13	34
13	(United Kingdom) Rob Crawford	13	11	12	Ret	27
14	(United Kingdom) Alexander de Benedittis	15	12	10	Ret	26
15	(South Africa) Gianna Pascoal	18	15	14	11	26
16	(United Kingdom) Max Yuill	16	14	15	15	24
17	(France) Solenn Amrouche	17	Ret	13	10	23
18	(United Kingdom) Toby Campbell	14	16	16	16	22
19	(United Kingdom) Archie Pearce	19	Ret	18	14	12
—	(United Kingdom) Henry Cameron	WD				0
Pos	Driver	R1	R2	R3	R4	Pts
Pos	Driver	SNE				Pts
