= Andrew Furlong =

Irish anglican dean

Andrew William Ussher Furlong was Dean of Clonmacnoise from 1997 until 2002.

Furlong was born in Dublin in 1947. His father was an academic at Trinity College, Dublin, and he himself studied there at both undergraduate and postgraduate levels. He was ordained in 1972, and after curacies in Dundela and Dublin. He was in Zimbabwe from 1983 to 1994, where he was Archdeacon of West Harare from 1988 to 1989, and then a Canon Residentiary at its cathedral from 1989 to 1994.

After this he was a hospital chaplain in Leeds, until his appointment as Dean.
