= Richard Craig (priest) =

Irish dean

Robert Stewart Craig (1867- 1930) was Dean of Clonmacnoise from 1923 until his death.

Craig was educated at Trinity College, Dublin and ordained in 1888. He spent his whole career at Kilbride.
