= Standish O'Grady =

Standish O'Grady may refer to:

- Standish O'Grady, 1st Viscount Guillamore (1766-1840), Lord Chief Baron of the Exchequer in Ireland
- Standish O'Grady, 2nd Viscount Guillamore (1792–1848), Anglo-Irish politician and British Army officer
- Standish O'Grady (poet) (before 1793-1846?), Irish-Canadian poet and priest
- Standish James O'Grady (1846–1928), Irish historical novelist and literary historian
- Standish Hayes O'Grady (1832–1915), Irish antiquarian
