= Richard Vincent (priest) =

Irish Anglican priest

Richard Blackhall Vincent was an Anglican Archdeacon in Ireland in the late eighteenth and early nineteenth centuries.

King was born in Loughgall and educated at Trinity College, Dublin. He was Archdeacon of Kilmacduagh from 1803 until his resignation in 1815. Also a Prebendary of Clonfert Cathedral, he was Vicar general of the Clonfert and Kilmacduagh diocese until his death in 1834.
