= Meiler a Búrc =

Irish Anglican priest; Archdeacon of Clonfert

Meiler a Búrc, a.k.a. Meiler De Burgh was an Irish priest in the later 1500s, and the first recorded Anglican Archdeacon of Clonfert.
