= Alexander Alcock (archdeacon of Kilmacduagh) =

Irish Anglican Archdeacon

Alexander Alcock (bapt. 1 May 1744 – 20 February 1807) was an Anglican Archdeacon in Ireland in the late eighteenth century.

Alcock was the son of Rev. John Alcock, Dean of Ferns, and grandson of Rev. Alexander Alcock, Dean of Lismore. His mother, Catherine Burgh, was the aunt of Walter Hussey Burgh. He was educated at Trinity College, Dublin.

He was Archdeacon of Kilmacduagh from 1780 until 1788. From then until his death in 1807, he was the Minister at St Paul's Episcopal Chapel Aberdeen.
