= John O'Grady =

John O'Grady may refer to:

- John O'Grady (athlete) (1891–1934), Irish Olympic shot putter
- John O'Grady (hurler) (1931-2024), Irish hurler, teacher, school principal, writer
- John O'Grady (priest) (1886–1966), Irish-American sociologist, economist, social reformer
- John O'Grady (writer) (1907–1981), Australian writer
- John O'Grady (American football) (born 1954), American football player and coach
