= William O'Grady (cleric) =

Irish cleric

William O'Grady (1801–1859) was an Anglican Archdeacon in Ireland in the middle of the nineteenth century.

O'Grady was the ninth child (4th son) of Standish O'Grady, 1st Viscount Guillamore, Lord Chief Baron of the Exchequer for Ireland from 1805 until 1831 and his wife Katherine Waller. He was educated at Eton College and Trinity College Dublin. He was Rector of Killinane, County Galway, and Archdeacon of Kilmacduagh from 1857 until his death on 21 July 1859. He married Isabella Sabina Hewitt, daughter of Henry Hewitt of Cork, but had no children. Isabella died in 1852, aged 36, and William erected a memorial in Loughrea Church to his "beloved wife".

During the Great Irish Famine of 1845-52, he was Secretary of the local Relief Committee, and a vocal and energetic spokesman for the afflicted Irish, both Protestant and Catholic. He did everything possible to alert the authorities to the magnitude of the crisis, and wrote at length to the newspapers on the subject.

The Killinane Volume, a register of the six parishes in his care, which William kept, and which was continued by his successors as Rector of Killinane, is a valuable source of local history.
