= Edward Rush (priest) =

19th-century Irish Anglican clergy

Edward Rush was an Anglican Archdeacon in Ireland in the second half of the nineteenth century.

Rush was educated at Trinity College, Dublin. He was the Rector of Loughrea from 1858 and Archdeacon of Kilmacduagh from 1882, holding both positions until his death.
