= Paul O'Grady (disambiguation) =

Paul O'Grady (1955–2023) was a British comedian, television presenter, actor, writer, and radio disc jockey.

Paul O'Grady may also refer to:

- Paul O'Grady (politician) (1960–2015), Australian politician
- Paul O'Grady (soccer) (born 1978), Australian former professional footballer
- Paul O'Grady (hurler) (born 1979), Irish hurler
