= Edward Dunsterville (priest) =

Irish Anglican cleric

Edward Dunsterville was Archdeacon of Kilmacduagh from 1630 until 1637.

Dunsterville was educated at Trinity College, Dublin. He was a Prebendary of Ferns Cathedral from 1637 to 1638.

William Maziere Brady posits that Hugh Dunsterville, who was later Archdeacon of Cloyne from 1661 until 1665, may have been his son.
