= Alex O'Grady =

Irish racing driver (born 2008)

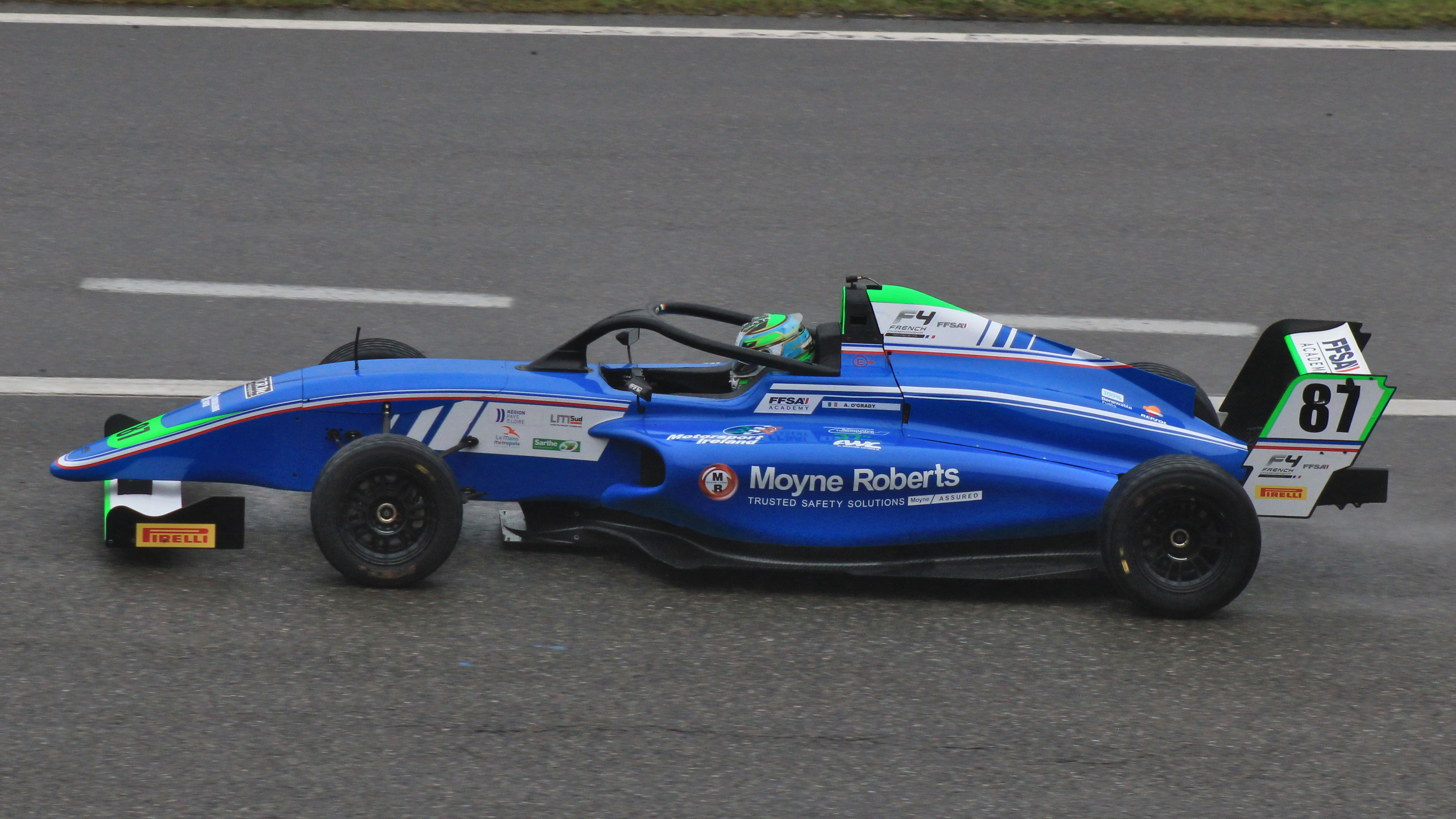
- O'Grady in 2024
- Born: Alex O'Grady; 19 December 2008 (age 17); Loughrea, Ireland
- Nationality: (Republic of Ireland) Irish

GB4 Championship career
- Debut season: 2025
- Current team: KMR Sport
- Car number: 3
- Starts: 42
- Wins: 4
- Podiums: 12
- Poles: 2
- Fastest laps: 5
- Best finish: 1st in 2026

Previous series
- 2024: French F4 Championship

Championship titles
- 2026: GB4 Championship
- Statistics up to date as of 29 September 2026.

Alex O'Grady (born 19 December 2008) is an Irish racing driver who last competed for KMR Sport in the GB4 Championship.

== Career ==
O'Grady began karting at the age of five, competing until 2022. In his karting career, he most notably won the Irish Cadet Championship in 2018, and won the 2019 IAME International Final in the Mini class. He then passed to Junior karts in 2021 and stayed in it for two years, most notably finishing sixth in the 2022 IAME Warriors Final.

After reaching the finals in the 2023 FEED Racing Shootout, in which he missed out on a fully-funded seat in French F4, O'Grady made his single-seater debut in that series the following year. After missing out on points at Nogaro, O'Grady took his first podium of the season at the following round at Lédenon by finishing third in race two. O'Grady repeated the same feat two rounds later at the Nürburgring, before scoring just four points finished in the following three rounds as he ended the year 12th in points. During the season, O'Grady missed many Thursday test sessions due to limited funding and faced uncertainty over his single-seater career at the end of the year.

Despite this, O'Grady moved to the GB4 Championship the following year, becoming the 20th signing on that year's grid when he joined KMR Sport. Finishing no higher than 12th on his debut round at Donington Park, O'Grady scored his first top tens the following round at Silverstone, before taking his maiden single-seater win in race one at Oulton Park. O'Grady then finished second in race two, which was his best result across the following three rounds, as he finished no higher than fifth at both Snetterton and Silverstone and no higher than sixth at Brands Hatch. O'Grady then ended the year with a third-place finish in race three at Donington Park en route to an eighth-place points finish.

O'Grady returned to KMR Sport for his sophomore season in GB4 the following year. After starting the season with a podium at Silverstone, O'Grady took his maiden win of the season in race two at Oulton Park. The Irishman followed that up with another podium at Silverstone and two wins at Snetterton, before taking three podiums in the final two rounds to clinch the GB4 title. During 2026, O'Grady also made a cameo appearance in the F4 British Championship for Rodin Motorsport at Donington Park, replacing Dries Van Langendonck, who was barred from racing for one round after accumulating 12 penalty points.

== Karting record ==
=== Karting career summary ===
Season	Series	Team	Position
2018	Motorsport Ireland Karting – IAME Cadet	Daly Motorsport	1st
2019	British Kart Championship – IAME Cadet	Fusion Motorsport	18th
2019	IAME International Final – Mini		1st
2020	IAME Euro Series – X30 Mini	Fusion Motorsport	10th
2021	IAME Warriors Final – X30 Junior	Fusion Motorsport	28th
2022	WSK Super Master Series – OK-J	Forza Racing	57th
2022	Champions of the Future Winter Series – OK-J	Forza Racing	29th
2022	Champions of the Future – OK-J	Forza Racing	78th
2022	European Karting Championship – OK-J	Forza Racing	98th
2022	WSK Euro Series – OK-J	Forza Racing	39th
2022	Italian Karting Championship – OK-J	Forza Racing	24th
2022	Karting World Championship – OK-J	Forza Racing	28th
2022	WSK Open Cup – OK-J	Forza Racing	28th
2022	Trofeo delle Industrie – OK-J	Forza Racing	9th
2022	IAME Warriors Final – X30 Junior	Fusion Motorsport	6th

== Racing record ==
=== Racing career summary ===
Season	Series	Team	Races	Wins	Poles	F/Laps	Podiums	Points	Position
2024	French F4 Championship	FFSA Academy	20	0	0	0	2	56	12th
2025	GB4 Championship	KMR Sport	21	1	0	1	3	250	8th
2026	GB4 Championship	KMR Sport	21	3	2	4	9	445	**1st**
2026	F4 British Championship	Rodin Motorsport	3	0	0	0	0	3	41st

=== Complete French F4 Championship results ===
(key) (Races in bold indicate pole position; races in italics indicate fastest lap)

Year	1	2	3	4	5	6	7	8	9	10	11	12	13	14	15	16	17	18	19	20	21	DC	Points
2024	NOG; 1; 12	NOG; 2 C	NOG; 3; 22	LÉD; 1; 11	LÉD; 2; 3	LÉD; 3; 8	SPA; 1; 7	SPA; 2; 7	SPA; 3 Ret	NÜR; 1; 10	NÜR; 2; 3	NÜR; 3; 10	MAG; 1; 9	MAG; 2; 7	MAG; 3; 7	DIJ; 1; 23	DIJ; 2; 17	DIJ; 3; 13	LEC; 1; 4	LEC; 2; 11	LEC; 3; 15	12th	56

=== Complete GB4 Championship results ===
(key) (Races in bold indicate pole position) (Races in italics indicate fastest lap)

Year	Entrant	1	2	3	4	5	6	7	8	9	10	11	12	13	14	15	16	17	18	19	20	21	22	DC	Points
2025	KMR Sport	DON; 1; 15	DON; 2; 12	DON; 3; 13^{12}	SIL1; 1; 13	SIL1; 2; 8	SIL1; 3; 9^{4}	OUL; 1; 1	OUL; 2; 2	OUL; 3; 14	SNE; 1; 5	SNE; 2; 7	SNE; 3; 10	SIL2; 1; 13	SIL2; 2; 5	SIL2; 3; 18	BRH; 1; 6	BRH; 2; 6	BRH; 3 C	DON2; 1 Ret	DON2; 2; 20	DON2; 3; 3^{3}	DON2; 4; 20	8th	250
2026	KMR Sport	SIL1; 1; 3	SIL1; 2; 5	SIL1; 3; 7^{4}	OUL; 1; 2	**OUL**; **2**; 1	OUL; 3; 10^{1}	DON1; 1; 6	DON1; 2; 4	DON1; 3; 4^{6}	SIL2; 1; 2	SIL2; 2; 5	SIL2; 3; 5^{4}	SNE; 1; 1	**SNE**; **2**; 1	SNE; 3; 12	DON2; 1; 2	DON2; 2; 6	DON2; 3; 10	BRH; 1; 2	BRH; 2; 2	BRH; 3; 6^{4}		1st	445

* Season still in progress.
