= Saybrook, Illinois =

- Village
- Location of Saybrook in McLean County, Illinois.
- Coordinates: 40°25′41″N 88°31′35″W
- Country: United States
- State: Illinois
- County: McLean
- Township: Cheney's Grove

Area
  - Total: 0.83 sq mi (2.15 km^{2})
  - Land: 0.80 sq mi (2.08 km^{2})
  - Water: 0.027 sq mi (0.07 km^{2})
- Elevation: 810 ft (250 m)

Population (2020)
  - Total: 654
  - Density: 815.7/sq mi (314.94/km^{2})
- Time zone: UTC-6 (CST)
  - Summer (DST): UTC-5 (CDT)
- ZIP code: 61770
- Area code: 309
- FIPS code: 17-67912
- GNIS ID: 2399767

Saybrook is a village in McLean County, Illinois, United States. The population was 654 at the 2020 census. It is part of the Bloomington–Normal Metropolitan Statistical Area.

Known by locals as the "City of Shade and Water", it is believed to be named in honor of Old Saybrook, Connecticut.

== History ==
=== Founding ===
Saybrook was laid out March 4, 1856, by Isaac M. Polk (c.1814–?). Little is known about Polk as he was born in Indiana and did not live in McLean County for very long. In 1860 and 1870, he was in neighboring Livingston County.

Before Polk, Jonathan Cheney came to the area in 1825 and built a cabin across the river from what is present-day Saybrook. Then, in 1833, Robert Cunningham built a water-driven mill on the Sangamon, which was later replaced by a steam-driven mill. By 1857, the town consisted of a saw mill, a blacksmith shop, a carpenter shop, one store, and eight dwellings. The woodland along the Sangamon, which became known as Cheney's Grove, attracted early settlers. The township in which the town was situated took its name from the woodland and was called Cheney's Grove. The name "Saybrook" was adopted in 1865, likely by settlers who came from Old Saybrook, Connecticut.

The town of Saybrook was incorporated May 29, 1866.

=== Original town plan and development ===
The original town of Saybrook was one of the smallest in McLean County. It consisted of a simple square of four blocks, each containing eight lots. This original plat was laid out over a series of road and lot lines that were aligned at roughly 45 degrees to the first official town plat. Several old lines, shown in dashed markings, can be seen on the 1856 plat. The original town had no square or other distinguishing features. Lore says its indistinction was to make the town look as large as possible to railroad promoters, but this seems unlikely as Saybrook (and thus its physical properties) was well known to many of the men associated with the founding of the railroad. In 1866, the town council laid out a large addition north and east of town.

=== Bending the railroad ===
One thing evident to the citizens of the fledgling town: it would only flourish if a railroad could be attracted. The most likely railroad was the one which would later become the Lake Erie and Western. It would be built to run due east from Bloomington to Paxton in neighboring Ford County and, because of this, would probably miss Saybrook by several miles. At this point, three Cheney brothers, sons of Jonathan Cheney, entered the picture. Haines Cheney, then in the Illinois Senate, had arranged for the charter of the road. To fund the railroad, local towns and townships would issue bonds, which the taxpayers would eventually retire. Two other Cheney brothers, Jonathan H. Cheney and William H. Cheney - who was the second largest landowner in Cheney's Grove Township - became members of the railroad's board of directors. William H. Riggs, the supervisor of Cheney's Grove Township, was also on the board. Cheney's Grove Township voted to fund $50,000 in bonds, and the town of Saybrook added an additional $10,000 in bonds. With this kind of backing, the route of the road was deflected and it passed through the town. In November 1871, when the tracks reached the village limits of Saybrook, a great celebration was held. A bottle of champagne was produced, but rather than smash the bottle, the thrifty reception committee simply knocked off its neck so the contents could be consumed later. The new Christian church in Saybrook invited visitors from Bloomington to attend their first service and announced that there would be a special train "on our railroad".

=== After the railroad ===
Once the railroad was established in 1870, Saybrook grew rapidly and soon became the largest grain shipping point in eastern McLean County. A depot with depot grounds was established just south of the original town. The railroad goes over the Sangamon River. In 1870, Thomas Holloway built the large brick Union House Hotel. In 1872, a newspaper was established. There was a boom in the construction of houses and stores. By 1900 there were 879 people in the town. In the twentieth century, the population of Saybrook declined by about fifteen percent. By 2000 Saybrook was smaller than it had been a century before.

== Geography ==
Saybrook is in southeastern McLean County, 27 miles (43 km) east of Bloomington, the county seat; 15 miles (24 km) northeast of Farmer City; and 10 miles (16 km) southwest of Gibson City.

According to the U.S. Census Bureau, Saybrook has a total area of 0.83 square miles (2.15 km^{2}), of which 0.03 square miles (0.08 km^{2}), or 3.49%, are water. The Sangamon River, at this point the size of a small creek, flows southeasterly through the southwest part of the village. Saybrook is the uppermost community on the Sangamon.

== Demographics ==
Historical population
Census	Pop.	Note	%±
1860	69		—
1870	389		463.8%
1880	734		88.7%
1890	861		17.3%
1900	879		2.1%
1910	805		−8.4%
1920	752		−6.6%
1930	746		−0.8%
1940	779		4.4%
1950	758		−2.7%
1960	859		13.3%
1970	814		−5.2%
1980	882		8.4%
1990	767		−13.0%
2000	764		−0.4%
2010	693		−9.3%
2020	654		−5.6%
Decennial US Census

As of the census of 2000, there were 764 people, 325 households, and 219 families residing in the village. The population density was 964.3 inhabitants per square mile (372.3/km^{2}). There were 340 housing units at an average density of 429.2 per square mile (165.7/km^{2}). The racial makeup of the village was 98.82% White, 0.13% African American, 0.13% Asian, and 0.92% from two or more races. Hispanic or Latino of any race were 0.26% of the population.

There were 325 households, out of which 31.7% had children under the age of 18 living with them, 54.8% were married couples living together, 9.5% had a female householder with no husband present, and 32.6% were non-families. 28.9% of all households were made up of individuals, and 13.5% had someone living alone who was 65 years of age or older. The average household size was 2.35 and the average family size was 2.88.

In the village, the population was spread out, with 25.3% under the age of 18, 7.5% from 18 to 24, 28.3% from 25 to 44, 23.3% from 45 to 64, and 15.7% who were 65 years of age or older. The median age was 39 years. For every 100 females, there were 90.5 males. For every 100 females age 18 and over, there were 87.8 males.

The median income for a household in the village was $37,778, and the median income for a family was $43,750. Males had a median income of $29,688 versus $21,806 for females. The per capita income for the village was $16,671. About 7.7% of families and 8.6% of the population were below the poverty line, including 12.6% of those under age 18 and 8.0% of those age 65 or over.

== Notable people ==
- Blake Feese, racing driver
- Ele Stansbury, Indiana Attorney General (1917–1921)
