= William Roe (priest) =

Irish Anglican priest

William Roe was an Anglican Archdeacon in Ireland in the second half of the 19th century.

Roe was educated at Trinity College Dublin. He was Archdeacon of Kilmacduagh from 1859 until his death on 16 February 1882.
