= Archdeacon of Clonfert =

The Archdeacon of Clonfert was a senior ecclesiastical officer within the Diocese of Clonfert until 1625; the Diocese of Clonfert and Kilmacduagh until 1834 when it became an office within the Diocese of Killaloe and Clonfert. The Archdeaconry can trace its history from Meiler De Burgo who held office from 1550 to 1587 through to the last discrete incumbent Henry Varian Daly who died in 1925.
