= Cheney's Grove Township, McLean County, Illinois =

Cheney's Grove Township
- Township
- Location in McLean County

- McLean County's location in Illinois
- Coordinates: 40°25′0″N 88°31′0″W
- Country: United States
- State: Illinois
- County: McLean
- Established: November 3, 1857

Area
  - Total: 36.51 sq mi (94.6 km^{2})
  - Land: 36.46 sq mi (94.4 km^{2})
  - Water: 0.05 sq mi (0.13 km^{2}) 0.14%

Population (2010)
  - Estimate (2016): 980
  - Density: 27.3/sq mi (10.5/km^{2})
- Time zone: UTC-6 (CST)
  - Summer (DST): UTC-5 (CDT)
- FIPS code: 17-113-12905

Cheney's Grove Township is located in McLean County, Illinois. As of the 2010 census, its population was 997 and it contained 454 housing units.

== Geography ==
According to the 2010 census, the township has a total area of 36.51 square miles (94.6 km^{2}), of which 36.46 square miles (94.4 km^{2}) (or 99.86%) is land and 0.05 square miles (0.13 km^{2}) (or 0.14%) is water.

== Demographics ==
Historical population
Census	Pop.	Note	%±
2016 (est.)	980
U.S. Decennial Census
