= Archdeacon of Kilmacduagh =

The Archdeacon of Kilmacduagh was a senior ecclesiastical officer within the Diocese of Kilmacduagh in County Galway, Ireland until 1625; the Diocese of Clonfert and Kilmacduagh until 1834 when it became an office within the Diocese of Killaloe and Clonfert. The Archdeaconry can trace its history from Florence M'Anoglaigh who held office during 1333 through to the last discrete incumbent Edward Rush who died in 1891.

== Archdeacons ==
Archdeacons of Kilmacduagh
From	Until	Incumbent	Notes
?	1333	Florence M'Anoglaigh	He was Archdeacon of Killoran until his death in 1333. Henry Cotton proposes him as a precursor to the position, saying that Killoran is the name of a parish within the archdeaconry.
fl. 1591		John Miles	He is mentioned as Archdeacon in 1591.
fl. 1607		Malachi/Malachnan M'Embrehuna	He is mentioned as "Archdeacon of Kilmakugh, otherwise Down" in 1607.
1630	1637	Edward Dunsterville	
1637	after 1639	Roger Lloyd	
1661	1662	John Pullein	
fl. 1687		Henry Bankes	
1702	1713	Robert Shawe	
1713	1726	Robert Taylour	
1745	1750	Henry Wright	
1750	1769	John Doyle	
1770	1788	Alexander Alcock	
1788	1791	William Darby	
1791	?	Francis Browne	
1797	?	Francis Hall	
1803	1815	Richard Vincent	
1815	1830	Robert King	
1830	?	Thomas Magee	
1855	?	William O'Grady	
?	1882	William Roe	
?	1891	Edward Rush	
1891	1925	Henry Daly	
