= Rashid Al Dhaheri =

Emirati racing driver (born 2008)

- راشد الظاهري
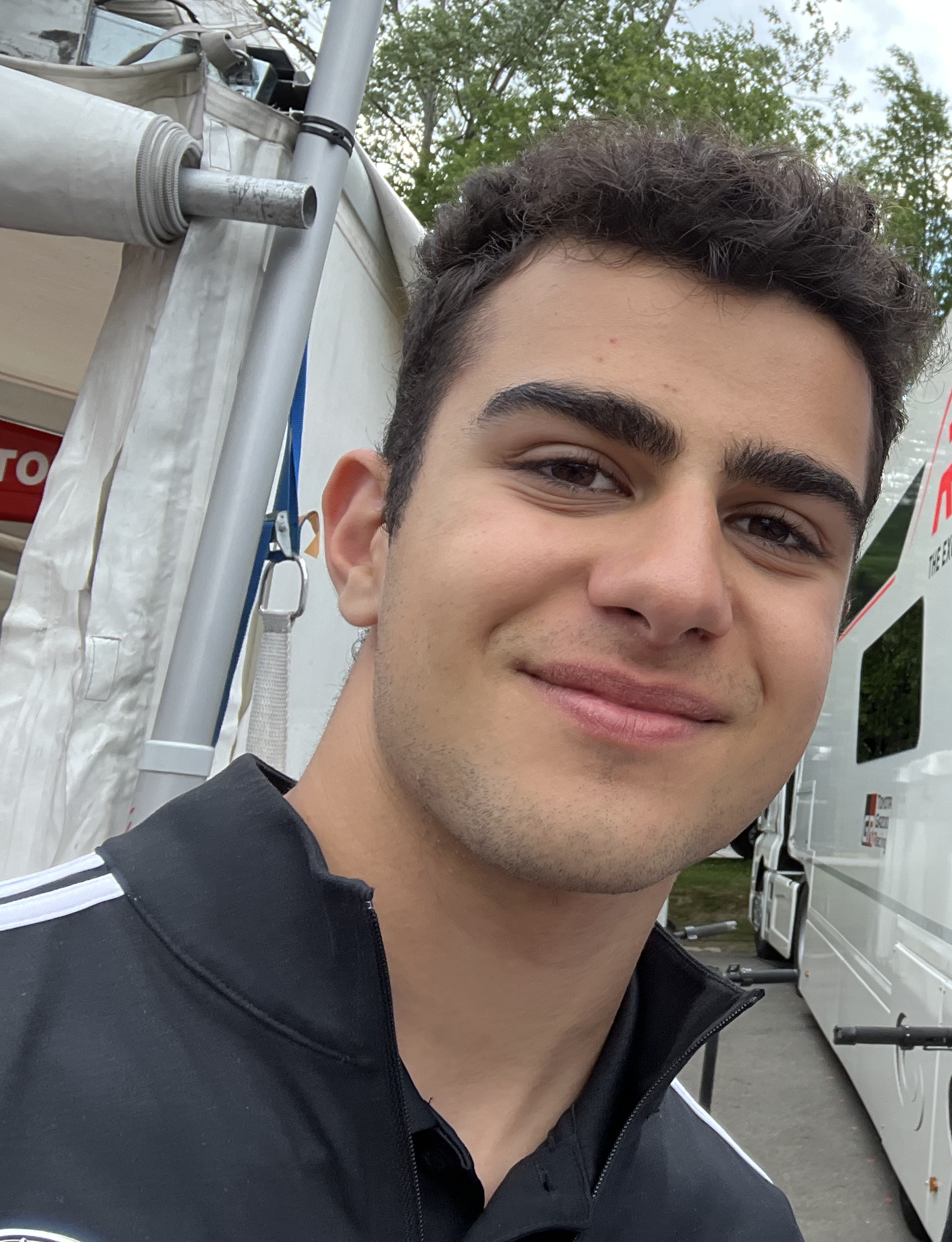
- Al Dhaheri in 2025
- Born: 8 April 2008 (age 18); Abu Dhabi, United Arab Emirates
- Nationality: (United Arab Emirates) Emirati

Formula Regional European Championship career
- Car number: 71
- Former teams: Prema Racing, R-ace GP
- Starts: 38
- Wins: 3
- Podiums: 11
- Poles: 2
- Fastest laps: 5
- Best finish: 4th in 2026

Previous series
- 2025–2026; 2025–2026; 2024; 2024; 2023; 2023–2024; 2023–2024: FR European; FR Middle East; Formula Trophy UAE; F4 UAE; F4 South East Asia; Euro 4; Italian F4
- Statistics up to date as of 15 October 2026.

Rashid Al Dhaheri (Arabic: راشد الظاهري; born 8 April 2008) is an Emirati racing driver who is set to compete in the FIA Formula 3 Championship for Van Amersfoort Racing as part of the Mercedes Junior Team.

Born and raised in Abu Dhabi, Al Dhaheri began competitive kart racing aged five, winning several international titles. He contested Formula 4 from 2023 to 2024 in the Italian, Euro 4, South East Asia, and UAE Championships for Prema, claiming runner-up to Kai Daryanani in the latter's Trophy rounds. Graduating to Formula Regional in 2025, he finished sixth in the Middle East Championship before joining the Mercedes Junior Team and claiming three podiums in the European Championship, finishing eighth; he finished fourth the following year.

== Racing career ==
=== Karting (2018–2022) ===
Al Dhaheri quickly shone on the European stage of karting, winning the 2019 WSK Super Master Series, and also the 2019 WSK Euro Series in the 60 Mini category. This was followed up by victory at the South Garda Winter Cup in the same category in 2020. Over the course of 2020, Al Dhaheri switched to OK-Junior karts, with a best result of fourth at the Andrea Margutti Trophy. Al Dhaheri continued in OK-Junior for 2021, winning the WSK Super Master Series again. He continued to have some strong and consistent results in preparation for the step up to OK karts. His move to OK Karting for 2022 sparked some unremarkable results, with his most notable results being 16th in the championship in the WSK Super Master Series and 11th in the Italian ACI Championship.

=== Formula 4 (2023–2024) ===
==== 2023 ====
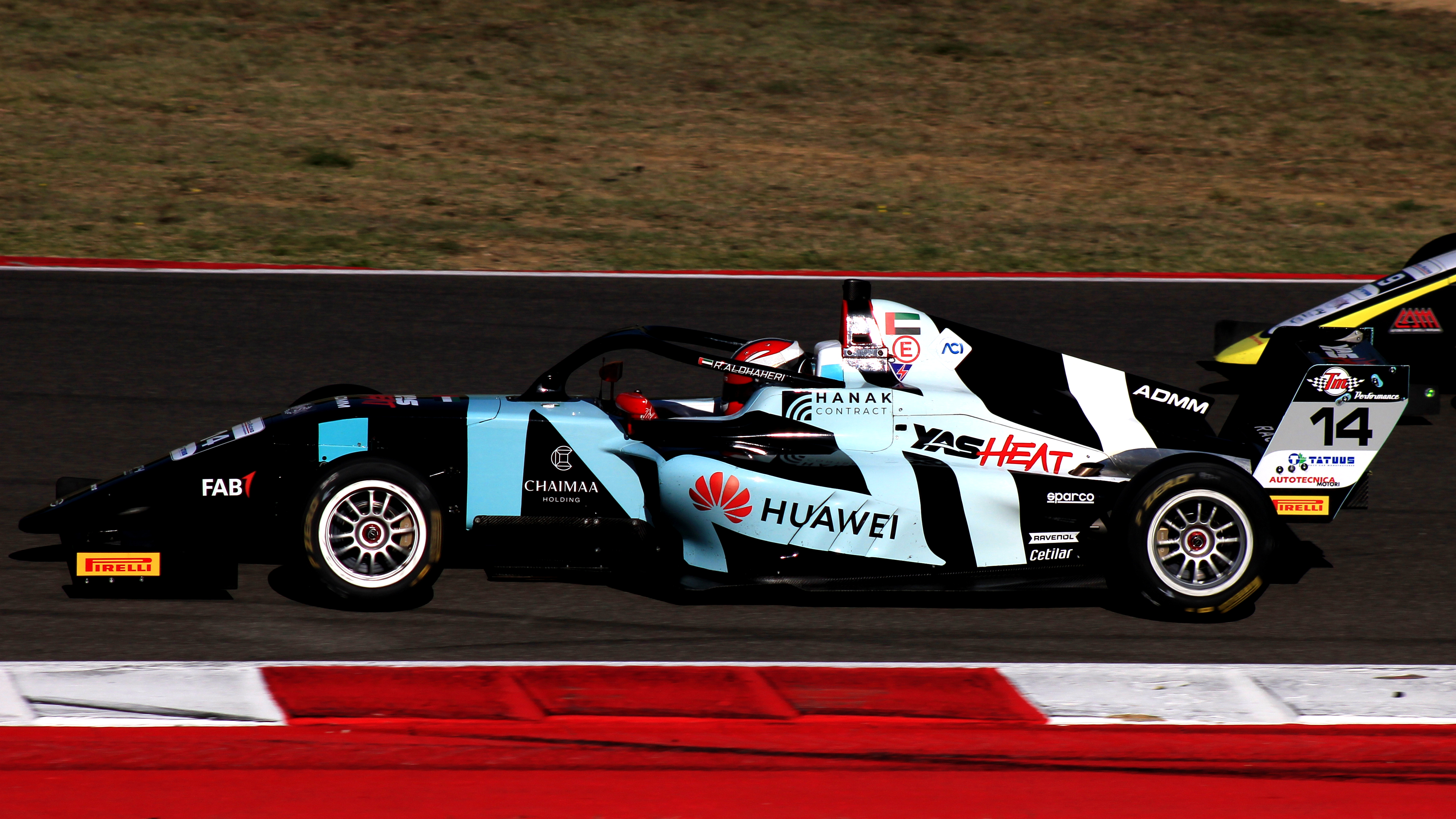
Al Dhaheri racing at the Mugello Circuit during the 2023 Italian F4 Championship

On 28 December 2022, Prema Racing announced that Al Dhaheri would be joining the team for the 2023 Italian F4 Championship. The season began on 22 April, and Al Dhaheri secured two seventh-place finishes, giving him 12 points after the conclusion of the first round. Al Dhaheri went on to score 56 more points in the championship, and scored a best finish of fourth at both Monza and Mugello on the way to tenth place in the drivers' standings. Al Dhaheri also competed in the Euro 4 Championship, finishing 12th with Prema. In November, Al Dhaheri competed at the Macau Formula 4 Race at the prestigious Guia Circuit. He finished the qualifying race in fourth, and the final race in third, giving him his first Formula 4 podium. Al Dhaheri also did one round of the 2023 Formula 4 South East Asia Championship, where he won his first Formula 4 race at Sepang.

==== 2024 ====
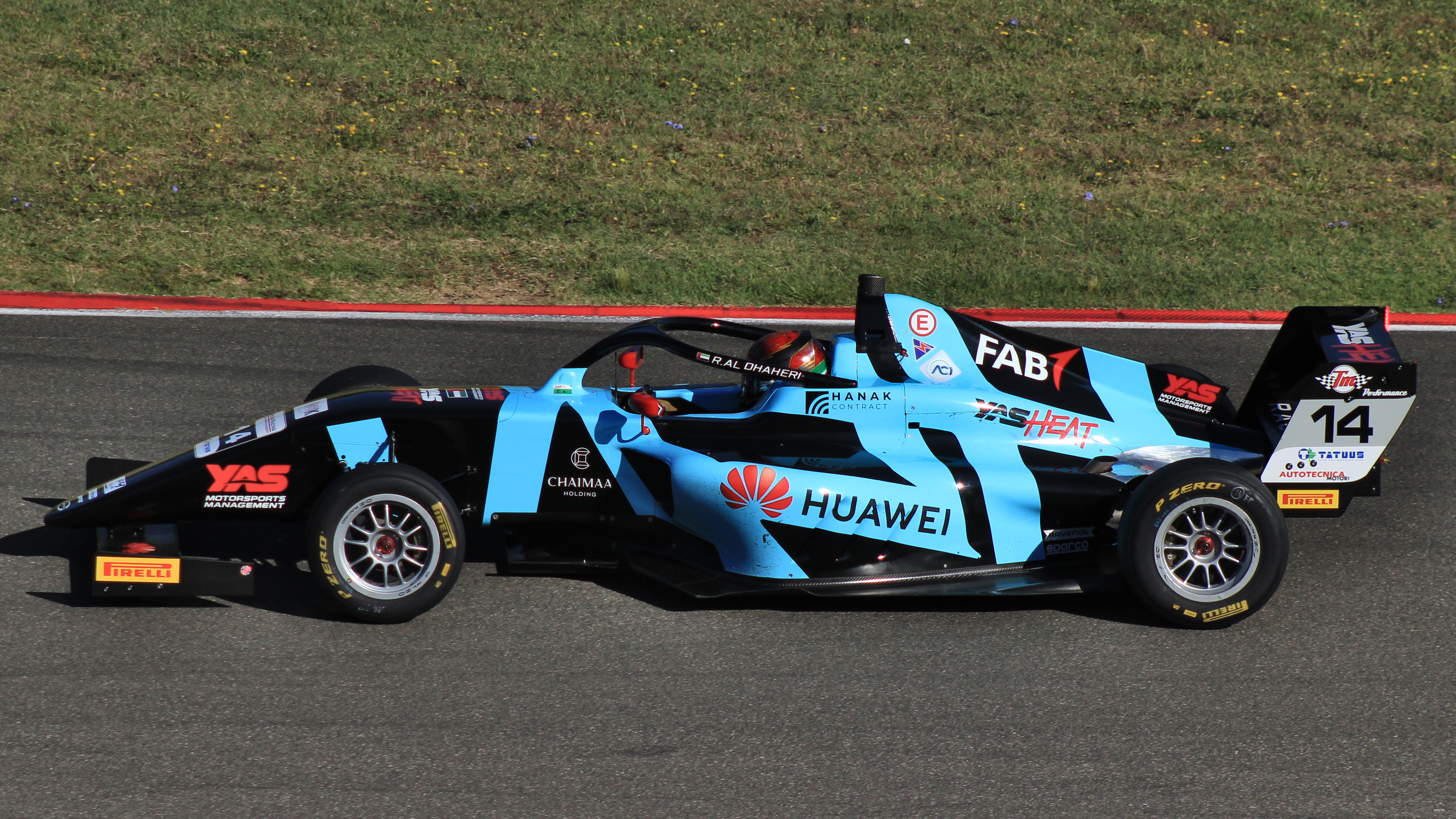
Al Dhaheri racing at the Mugello Circuit during the 2024 Italian F4 Championship

On 2 January 2024, Al Dhaheri was announced to continue with Prema Racing for the 2024 Italian F4 and Euro 4 Championships. It was later announced that he would take part in the 2024 Formula 4 UAE Championship, also with Prema. Al Dhaheri had a very strong winter campaign in F4 UAE, winning two races and picking up five podiums on his way to fourth place in the championship.

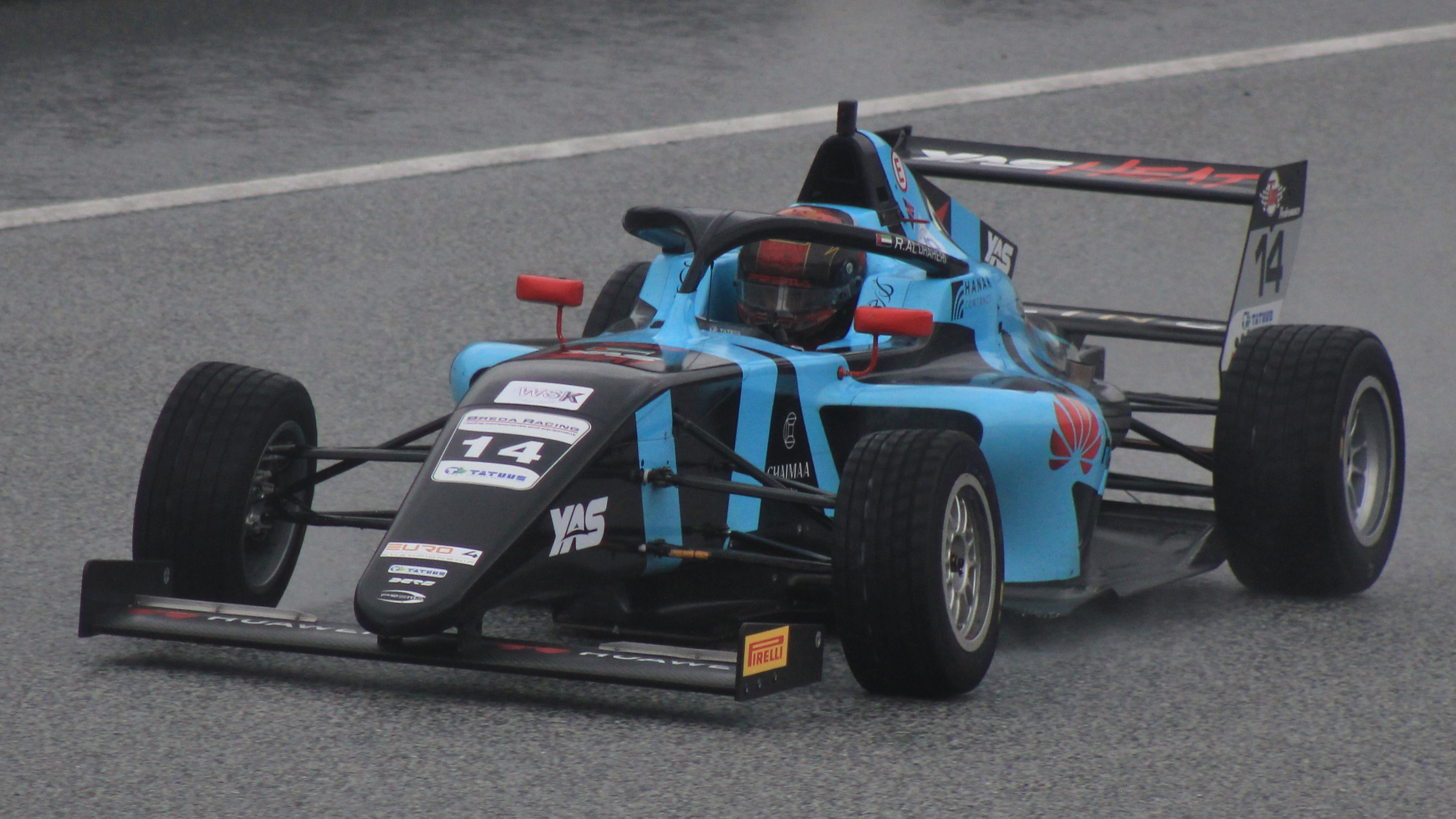
Al Dhaheri racing at the Red Bull Ring during the 2024 Euro 4 Championship

=== Formula Regional (2024–2026) ===
==== 2024 ====
Al Dhaheri made his debut in Formula Regional machinery with PHM Racing during the FIA Formula Regional World Cup. He would finish the race but was later disqualified for technical infringements.

==== 2025 ====
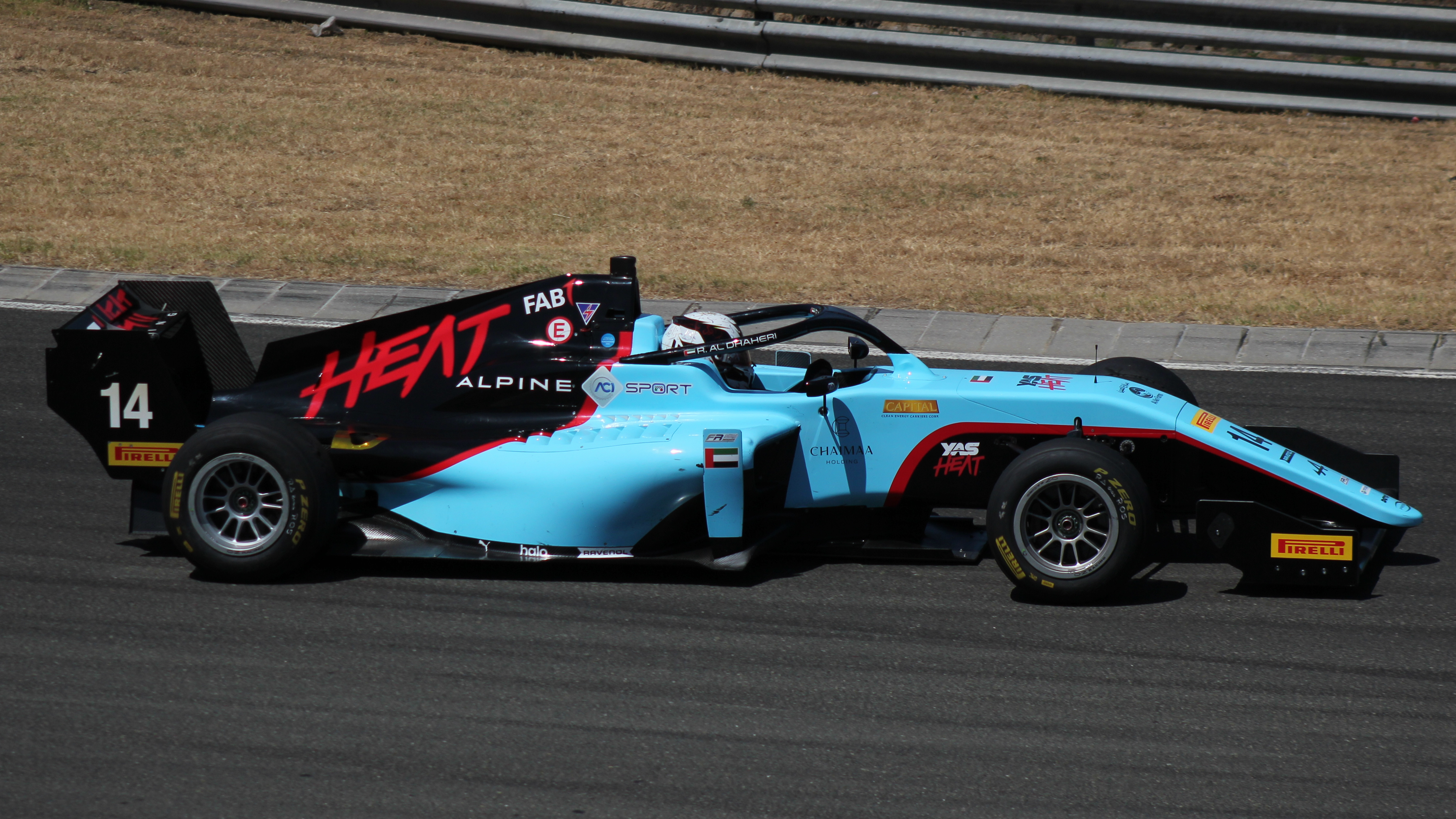
Al Dhaheri driving at the Hungaroring during the 2025 Formula Regional European Championship

During the 2025 pre-season, Al Dhaheri raced in the Formula Regional Middle East Championship with Mumbai Falcons.

For his main campaign, Al Dhaheri was promoted to the Formula Regional European Championship with Prema Racing, partnering his Italian F4 rivals Freddie Slater and Jack Beeton.

Alongside his European campaign, Al Dhaheri was set to contest selected rounds of the GB3 Championship with Chris Dittmann Racing, but eventually did not take part in any rounds.

==== 2026 ====
Al Dhaheri raced in the pre-season Formula Regional Middle East Trophy with R-ace GP. He remained with the team as he competed in his second year of the Formula Regional European Championship alongside Emanuele Olivieri and Yuki Sano.

At the end of November, Al Dhaheri continued with R-ace GP to compete in the Macau Grand Prix.

=== FIA Formula 3 (2027) ===
Al Dhaheri will progress to Formula Three in 2027, joining Van Amersfoort Racing alongside Enzo Deligny and Yevan David.

=== Formula One ===
In March 2025, Al Dhaheri was announced to be joining the Mercedes Junior Team.

== Karting record ==
=== Karting career summary ===
Season	Series	Team (s)	Position
2018	Asian Open Championship — Mini Rok	Tony Kart Racing Team	1st
2019	WSK Champions Cup - 60 Mini	Parolin Motorsport	3rd
2019	WSK Super Master Series - 60 Mini	Parolin Motorsport	1st
2019	Winter Cup - Mini Rok	Parolin Motorsport	8th
2019	WSK Euro Series - 60 Mini	Parolin Motorsport	1st
2019	Andrea Margutti Trophy - 60 Mini	Parolin Motorsport	3rd
2019	WSK Open Cup - 60 Mini	Parolin Motorsport	9th
2019	WSK Final Cup - 60 Mini	Parolin Motorsport	14th
2020	WSK Champions Cup - 60 Mini	Parolin Motorsport	3rd
2020	WSK Super Master Series - 60 Mini	Parolin Motorsport	5th
2020	Winter Cup - Mini Rok	Parolin Motorsport	1st
2020	CIK-FIA European Championship - OKJ	Parolin Motorsport	96th
2020	WSK Euro Series - OKJ	Parolin Motorsport	21st
2020	Champions of the Future - OKJ	Parolin Motorsport	17th
2020	CIK-FIA World Championship - OKJ	Parolin Motorsport	13th
2020	Andrea Margutti Trophy - OKJ	Parolin Motorsport	4th
2020	WSK Open Cup - OKJ	Parolin Motorsport	14th
2021	WSK Champions Cup - OKJ	Parolin Motorsport	1st
2021	WSK Super Master Series - OKJ	Parolin Motorsport	1st
2021	WSK Euro Series - OKJ	Parolin Motorsport	5th
2021	Champions of the Future - OKJ	Parolin Motorsport; Kart Republic	13th
2021	CIK-FIA European Championship - OKJ	Parolin Motorsport; EXPIRIT Kart	8th
2021	WSK Open Cup - OKJ	Kart Republic	4th
2021	CIK-FIA World Championship - OKJ	Kart Republic	NC
2021	Winter Cup - OKJ	Kart Republic	4th
2021	WSK Final Cup - OKJ	Kart Republic	6th
2022	WSK Super Master Series - OK	Kart Republic	16th
2022	Winter Series - OK	Kart Republic	11th
2022	Champions of the Future - OK	Kart Republic	32nd
2022	CIK-FIA European Championship - OK	EXPIRIT Kart	34th
2022	WSK Euro Series - OK	Parolin Motorsport	38th
2022	Italian ACI Championship - OK	Parolin Motorsport	11th
2022	CIK-FIA World Championship - OK	Parolin Motorsport	33rd

== Racing record ==
=== Racing career summary ===
Season	Series	Team	Races	Wins	Poles	F/Laps	Podiums	Points	Position
2023	Italian F4 Championship	Prema Racing	21	0	0	0	0	68	10th
2023	Euro 4 Championship	Prema Racing	9	0	0	0	0	27	12th
2023	Formula 4 South East Asia Championship	Prema Racing	5	1	0	1	1	25	15th
2023	Macau Formula 4 Race	Prema Racing	2	0	0	0	1	—N/a	**3rd**
2023	Formula 4 UAE Championship – Trophy Round	Prema Racing	2	0	0	0	1	—N/a	NC
2024	Formula 4 UAE Championship	Prema Racing	15	2	1	0	5	153	4th
2024	Italian F4 Championship	Prema Racing	21	0	0	1	1	95	10th
2024	Euro 4 Championship	Prema Racing	6	0	0	0	1	35	11th
2024	Formula Trophy UAE	Mumbai Falcons Racing Limited	5	2	4	4	4	96	**2nd**
2024	Macau Grand Prix	PHM Racing	1	0	0	0	0	—N/a	DSQ
2025	Formula Regional Middle East Championship	Mumbai Falcons Racing Limited	15	0	0	0	3	144	6th
2025	Formula Regional European Championship	Prema Racing	19	0	1	1	3	105	8th
2025	Macau Grand Prix	SJM Theodore Prema Racing	1	0	0	0	0	—N/a	20th
2026	Formula Regional Middle East Trophy	R-ace GP	11	3	1	3	4	139	**2nd**
2026	Formula Regional European Championship	R-ace GP	19	3	1	2	8	180	4th
2026	Macau Grand Prix	R-ace GP						—N/a	
2027	FIA Formula 3 Championship	Van Amersfoort Racing	0	0	0	0	0	0	TBD

* Season still in progress.

=== Complete Italian F4 Championship results ===
(key) (Races in bold indicate pole position) (Races in italics indicate fastest lap)

Year	Team	1	2	3	4	5	6	7	8	9	10	11	12	13	14	15	16	17	18	19	20	21	22	DC	Points
2023	Prema Racing	IMO; 1; 7	IMO; 2; 7	IMO; 3	IMO; 4; 30†	MIS; 1; 7	MIS; 2 DNS	MIS; 3; 6	SPA; 1; 9	SPA; 2; 8	SPA; 3 Ret	MNZ; 1; 29†	MNZ; 2; 10	MNZ; 3; 4	LEC; 1; 11	LEC; 2; 9	LEC; 3; 25	MUG; 1; 4	MUG; 2; 5	MUG; 3; 26	VLL; 1; 17	VLL; 2; 10	VLL; 3; 21	10th	68
2024	Prema Racing	MIS; 1; 10	MIS; 2; 5	MIS; 3; 5	IMO; 1; 8	IMO; 2; 6	IMO; 3 Ret	VLL; 1; 4	VLL; 2 Ret	VLL; 3; 9	MUG; 1; 16	MUG; 2; 3	MUG; 3; 7	LEC; 1; 7	LEC; 2; 6	LEC; 3; 26	CAT; 1; 10	CAT; 2; 9	CAT; 3; 14	MNZ; 1; 5	MNZ; 2; 21	MNZ; 3; 14		10th	95

=== Complete Euro 4 Championship results ===
(key) (Races in bold indicate pole position; races in italics indicate fastest lap)

Year	Team	1	2	3	4	5	6	7	8	9	DC	Points
2023	Prema Racing	MUG; 1; 14	MUG; 2; 6	MUG; 3; 11	MNZ; 1; 7	MNZ; 2; 9	MNZ; 3; 7	CAT; 1; 10	CAT; 2; 15	CAT; 3; 9	12th	27
2024	Prema Racing	MUG; 1; 7	MUG; 2; 10	MUG; 3; 17	RBR; 1; 9	RBR; 2; 6	RBR; 3; 2	MNZ; 1	MNZ; 2	MNZ; 3	11th	35

=== Complete Formula 4 South East Asia Championship results ===
(key) (Races in bold indicate pole position; races in italics indicate fastest lap)

Year	Entrant	1	2	3	4	5	6	7	8	9	10	11	Pos	Points
2023	Prema Racing	ZZIC1; 1	ZZIC1; 2	ZZIC1; 3	MAC; 1; 4	MAC; 2; 3	SEP1; 1	SEP1; 2	SEP1; 3	SEP2; 1; 1	SEP2; 2 Ret	SEP2; 3; 13	15th	25

=== Complete Formula 4 UAE Championship results ===
(key) (Races in bold indicate pole position; races in italics indicate fastest lap)

Year	Team	1	2	3	4	5	6	7	8	9	10	11	12	13	14	15	DC	Points
2024	Prema Racing	YMC1; 1; 5	YMC1; 2; 18	YMC1; 3; 3	YMC2; 1; 4	YMC2; 2; 4	YMC2; 3; 22	DUB1; 1 Ret	DUB1; 2; 7	DUB1; 3; 27	YMC3; 1; 2	YMC3; 2; 6	**YMC3**; **3**; 1	DUB2; 1; 2	DUB2; 2; 8	DUB2; 3; 1	4th	153

=== Complete Macau Grand Prix results ===
Year	Team	Car	Qualifying	Qualifying Race	Main Race
2024	(Germany) PHM Racing	Tatuus F3 T-318	12th	8th	DSQ
2025	(Hong Kong) SJM Theodore Prema Racing	Tatuus F3 T-318	8th	10th	20th
2026	(France) R-ace GP	Tatuus T-326	TBD	TBD	TBD

=== Complete Formula Trophy UAE results ===
(key) (Races in bold indicate pole position; races in italics indicate fastest lap)

Year	Team	1	2	3	4	5	6	7	DC	Points
2024	Mumbai Falcons Racing Limited	**DUB**; **1**; 1	DUB; 2; 2	**DUB**; **3**; 2	**YMC1**; **1**; 5	**YMC1**; **2**; 1	YMC2; 1	YMC2; 2	2nd	96

=== Complete Formula Regional Middle East Championship / Trophy results ===
(key) (Races in bold indicate pole position) (Races in italics indicate fastest lap)

Year	Entrant	1	2	3	4	5	6	7	8	9	10	11	12	13	14	15	DC	Points
2025	Mumbai Falcons Racing Limited	YMC1; 1; 2	YMC1; 2; 8	YMC1; 3; 16	YMC2; 1; 2	YMC2; 2; 5	YMC2; 3; 9	DUB; 1; 5	DUB; 2; 3	DUB; 3; 5	YMC3; 1; 5	YMC3; 2; 14	YMC3; 3; 23†	LUS; 1; 8	LUS; 2; 5	LUS; 3; 8	6th	144
2026	R-ace GP	YMC1; 1; 2	YMC1; 2; 5	**YMC1**; **3**; 1	YMC2; 1; 1	YMC2; 2; 15	YMC2; 3; 1	DUB; 1; 4	DUB; 2; 5	DUB; 3; 16	LUS; 1; 6	LUS; 2 C	LUS; 3; 7				2nd	139

=== Complete Formula Regional European Championship results ===
(key) (Races in bold indicate pole position) (Races in italics indicate fastest lap)

Year	Team	1	2	3	4	5	6	7	8	9	10	11	12	13	14	15	16	17	18	19	20	DC	Points
2025	Prema Racing	MIS; 1; 3	MIS; 2; 15	SPA; 1; 6	**SPA**; **2**; 12	ZAN; 1; 8	ZAN; 2; 13	HUN; 1; 4	HUN; 2; 2	LEC; 1 DNS	LEC; 2; 2	IMO; 1 Ret	IMO; 2; 12	RBR; 1; 7	RBR; 2; 5	CAT; 1; 8	CAT; 2; 18	HOC; 1; 12	HOC; 2; 12	MNZ; 1; 5	MNZ; 2; 20	8th	105
2026	R-ace GP	RBR; 1; 2	RBR; 2; 1	RBR; 3; 5	ZAN; 1; 5	ZAN; 2; 4	SPA; 1; 2	SPA; 2 C	SPA; 3; 3	MNZ; 1; 11	MNZ; 2; 1	MNZ; 3; 9	HUN; 1; 2	**HUN**; **2**; 1	LEC; 1; 26	LEC; 2; 6	IMO; 1 Ret	IMO; 2; 6	IMO; 3; 10	HOC; 1; 3	HOC; 2; 11	4th	180

=== Complete FIA Formula 3 Championship results ===
(key) (Races in bold indicate pole position) (Races in italics indicate fastest lap)

Year	Entrant	1	2	3	4	5	6	7	8	9	10	11	12	13	14	15	16	17	18	19	20	DC	Points
2027	Van Amersfoort Racing	BHR; SPR	BHR; FEA	JED; SPR	JED; FEA	MEL; SPR	MEL; FEA	MTL; SPR	MTL; FEA	MON; SPR	MON; FEA	SIL; SPR	SIL; FEA	RBR; SPR	RBR; FEA	MNZ; SPR	MNZ; FEA	MAD; SPR	MAD; FEA	IST; SPR	IST; FEA	TBD	TBD
