= 2023 Formula 4 South East Asia Championship =

Motorsport season

The 2023 Formula 4 South East Asia Championship was the fifth season of the Formula 4 South East Asia Championship and the first one since 2019. Top Speed was appointed as the new organizer and promoter as the series switched to the Tatuus F4-T421 car, the Abarth engine and the Giti tires.

== Teams and drivers ==
Team	No.	Driver	Class	Rounds
Formula 4 South East Asia Championship entries
(France) R-ace GP	1	(France) Raphaël Narac		2, NC
(France) R-ace GP	2	(France) Hadrien David		2, NC
(Hong Kong) BlackArts Racing	3	(Philippines) Iñigo Anton	R	3
(Hong Kong) BlackArts Racing	10	(Malaysia) Alister Yoong		2
(Hong Kong) BlackArts Racing	11	(United Arab Emirates) Ian Loggie (Note: Loggie is a Scottish driver who competes under an Emirati licence.)		2
(Hong Kong) BlackArts Racing	23	(India) Arjun Chheda	R	2
(Hong Kong) BlackArts Racing	28	(Hong Kong) Vivian Siu	R	1
(Hong Kong) BlackArts Racing	78	(Australia) Lincoln Taylor	R	3
(China) Asia Racing Team	7	(Macau) Tiago Rodrigues		1, NC
(China) Asia Racing Team	12	(China) Zhang Yu	R	1, 3
(China) Asia Racing Team	16	(China) Lu Ye		3
(China) Asia Racing Team	63	(Philippines) Joaquin Garrido	R	2
(China) Asia Racing Team	77	(Chinese Taipei) Enzo Yeh	R	2–3, NC
(China) Asia Racing Team	96	(China) Kevin Xiao	R	All, NC
(Italy) Prema Racing	8	(France) Doriane Pin	R	2–3
(Italy) Prema Racing	14	(United Arab Emirates) Rashid Al Dhaheri		3, NC
(Italy) Prema Racing	33	(Latvia) Tomass Štolcermanis	R	2
(Italy) Prema Racing	51	(United Kingdom) Kean Nakamura-Berta (Note: Nakamura Berta is a Japanese-Slovak driver who competes under a British licence.)	R	2–3
(Hong Kong) H-Star Racing	13	(Italy) Zhang Shimo (Note: Zhang is a Chinese driver racing under Italian license)		1
(Hong Kong) H-Star Racing	55	(Hong Kong) William Kwok		1
(Australia) AGI Sport	15	(Australia) Nicolas Stati	R	2–3
(Australia) AGI Sport	45	(Australia) Jack Beeton		All, NC
(Australia) AGI Sport	46	(Australia) Peter Bouzinelos	R	2–3
(China) R&B Racing	22	(China) Wang Zhongwei		All
(China) R&B Racing	23	(China) Jiang Fukang		1
(Japan) B-Max Racing Team	30	(Japan) "Dragon"		3, NC
(Chinese Taipei) Team KRC	68	(Chinese Taipei) Ethan Ho		1, NC
(Republic of Ireland) Pinnacle Motorsport	72	(Hong Kong) Liu Kaishun		2–3, NC
(Republic of Ireland) Pinnacle Motorsport	88	(India) Kai Daryanani		2–3, NC
(Republic of Ireland) Pinnacle Motorsport	99	(China) Yuhao Fu	R	2–3
Macau Formula 4 Race-only entries
(China) Asia Racing Team	4	(Macau) Marcus Cheong		NC
(Hong Kong) BlackArts Racing	5	(India) Jaden Pariat		NC
(Hong Kong) BlackArts Racing	19	(Philippines) Bianca Bustamante		NC
(Japan) Super License	8	(Japan) Miki Koyama		NC
(Hong Kong) SJM Theodore Prema Racing	11	(Macau) Charles Leong		NC
(Hong Kong) SJM Theodore Prema Racing	23	(United Kingdom) Arvid Lindblad		NC
(Hong Kong) SJM Theodore Prema Racing	27	(United Kingdom) Freddie Slater		NC
(China) Champ Motorsport	16	(Hong Kong) Chui Ka Kam		NC
(China) Champ Motorsport	28	(Hong Kong) Vivian Siu	R	NC
(Hong Kong) H-Star Racing	22	(Hong Kong) Thomas Leung		NC
(Hong Kong) H-Star Racing	53	(Hong Kong) Marco Lau		NC
(Republic of Ireland) Pinnacle Motorsport	34	(Norway) Martinius Stenshorne		NC

Icon	Legend
G	Guest drivers ineligible for Drivers' Championship
R	Rookie

== Calendar ==
The schedule consisted of 9 races over 3 rounds. Additionally, a non-championship Macau Formula 4 Race event was held during the first week of the 70th Macau Grand Prix.

Round		Circuit	Date	Pole position	Fastest lap	Winning driver	Winning team	Supporting
1	R1	(China) Zhuzhou International Circuit, Zhuzhou	28 October	(Australia) Jack Beeton	(Australia) Jack Beeton	(Australia) Jack Beeton	(Australia) AGI Sport	TCR China Touring Car Championship; China Touring Car Championship; Sports Cup - YRD Race
1	R2	(China) Zhuzhou International Circuit, Zhuzhou	29 October		(Macau) Tiago Rodrigues	(China) Kevin Xiao (Note: Rodrigues finished first but received a 10 seconds time penalty for causing a collision. Xiao inherited the win.)	(China) Asia Racing Team	TCR China Touring Car Championship; China Touring Car Championship; Sports Cup - YRD Race
1	R3	(China) Zhuzhou International Circuit, Zhuzhou	29 October	(Australia) Jack Beeton	(Australia) Jack Beeton	(Australia) Jack Beeton	(Australia) AGI Sport	TCR China Touring Car Championship; China Touring Car Championship; Sports Cup - YRD Race
NC	QR	Guia Circuit, Macau	12 November	(United Kingdom) Arvid Lindblad	(United Kingdom) Arvid Lindblad	(United Kingdom) Arvid Lindblad	(Hong Kong) SJM Theodore Prema Racing	Greater Bay Area GT Cup (GT3); Greater Bay Area GT Cup (GT4); TCR Asia Challenge; Macau Roadsport Challenge
NC	FR	Guia Circuit, Macau	12 November	(United Kingdom) Arvid Lindblad	(United Kingdom) Arvid Lindblad	(United Kingdom) Arvid Lindblad	(Hong Kong) SJM Theodore Prema Racing	Greater Bay Area GT Cup (GT3); Greater Bay Area GT Cup (GT4); TCR Asia Challenge; Macau Roadsport Challenge
2	R1	(Malaysia) Sepang International Circuit, Sepang	25 November	(France) Hadrien David	(France) Raphaël Narac	(France) Hadrien David	(France) R-ace GP	Sepang 1000km Endurance Race
2	R2	(Malaysia) Sepang International Circuit, Sepang	26 November		(France) Doriane Pin	(France) Hadrien David	(France) R-ace GP	Sepang 1000km Endurance Race
2	R3	(Malaysia) Sepang International Circuit, Sepang	26 November	(France) Hadrien David	(United Kingdom) Kean Nakamura-Berta	(France) Hadrien David	(France) R-ace GP	Sepang 1000km Endurance Race
3	R1	(Malaysia) Sepang International Circuit, Sepang	2 December	(United Kingdom) Kean Nakamura-Berta	(United Kingdom) Kean Nakamura-Berta	(United Arab Emirates) Rashid Al Dhaheri	(Italy) Prema Racing	Asian Le Mans Series
3	R2	(Malaysia) Sepang International Circuit, Sepang	3 December		(Australia) Peter Bouzinelos	(Australia) Nicolas Stati	(Australia) AGI Sport	Asian Le Mans Series
3	R3	(Malaysia) Sepang International Circuit, Sepang	3 December	(United Kingdom) Kean Nakamura-Berta	(United Arab Emirates) Rashid Al Dhaheri	(France) Doriane Pin	(Italy) Prema Racing	Asian Le Mans Series

== Championship standings ==
Points were awarded as follows.

Position	**1st**	**2nd**	**3rd**	**4th**	**5th**	**6th**	**7th**	**8th**	**9th**	**10th**
Points	25	18	15	12	10	8	6	4	2	1

=== Drivers' championship ===
Pos	Driver	ZZIC (China)			MAC (Macau)		SEP1 (Malaysia)			SEP2 (Malaysia)			Pts
Pos	Driver	R1	R2	R3	QR	FR	R1	R2	R3	R1	R2	R3	Pts
1	(Australia) Jack Beeton	**1**	Ret	**1**	5	4	3	5	4	2	3	5	130
2	(France) Doriane Pin						10	3	6	3	2	1	82
3	(France) Hadrien David				Ret	7	**1**	1	**1**				75
4	(China) Kevin Xiao	7	1	4	12	Ret	13	8	13	8	Ret	12	51
5	(Macau) Tiago Rodrigues	3	2	2	8	6							51
6	(United Kingdom) Kean Nakamura-Berta						5	6	2	**4**	Ret	**14**	48
7	(Chinese Taipei) Enzo Yeh				10	8	4	2	7	6	13	9	46
8	(China) Jiang Fukang	2	3	6									41
9	(Australia) Nicolas Stati						14	11	14	7	1	6	39
10	(India) Kai Daryanani				Ret	10	7	14	9	5	11	2	36
11	(China) Wang Zhongwei	4	5	7			12	9	16	12	7	11	36
12	(Latvia) Tomass Štolcermanis						6	4	3				35
13	(France) Raphaël Narac				7	Ret	2	Ret	5				28
14	(China) Zhang Yu	5	4	8						13	Ret	DNS	26
15	(United Arab Emirates) Rashid Al Dhaheri				4	3				1	Ret	13	25
16	(Australia) Lincoln Taylor									15	4	4	24
17	(Hong Kong) Liu Kaishun				Ret	Ret	8	7	15	Ret	8	7	20
18	(Chinese Taipei) Ethan Ho	8	Ret	3	6	5							19
19	(Australia) Peter Bouzinelos						18	12	11	10	9	3	18
20	(Hong Kong) Vivian Siu	6	6	10	17	14							17
21	(Philippines) Iñigo Anton									11	5	8	14
22	(Italy) Zhang Shimo	Ret	DSQ	5									10
23	(China) Yuhao Fu						16	Ret	12	9	6	Ret	10
24	(Malaysia) Alister Yoong						11	10	8				5
25	(Hong Kong) William Kwok	Ret	Ret	9									2
26	(India) Arjun Chheda						9	Ret	Ret				2
27	(Japan) "Dragon"				16	13				14	10	10	2
28	(Philippines) Joaquin Garrido						17	Ret	10				1
29	(China) Lu Ye									16	12	DNS	0
30	(United Arab Emirates) Ian Loggie						15	13	17				0
Macau Formula 4 Race-only drivers
–	(United Kingdom) Arvid Lindblad				**1**	**1**							–
–	(Macau) Charles Leong				3	2							–
–	(United Kingdom) Freddie Slater				2	9							–
–	(Philippines) Bianca Bustamante				9	Ret							–
–	(Hong Kong) Chui Ka Kam				13	11							–
–	(Japan) Miki Koyama				11	Ret							–
–	(Macau) Marcus Cheong				14	12							–
–	(Hong Kong) Thomas Leung				15	Ret							–
–	(Hong Kong) Marco Lau				18	Ret							–
–	(Norway) Martinius Stenshorne				NC	Ret							–
–	(India) Jaden Pariat				WD	WD							–
Pos	Driver	R1	R2	R3	QR	FR	R1	R2	R3	R1	R2	R3	Pts
Pos	Driver	ZZIC (China)			MAC (Macau)		SEP1 (Malaysia)			SEP2 (Malaysia)			Pts

Colour	Result
Gold	Winner
Silver	Second place
Bronze	Third place
Green	Points classification
Blue	Non-points classification
Blue	Non-classified finish (NC)
Purple	Retired, not classified (Ret)
Red	Did not qualify (DNQ)
Red	Did not pre-qualify (DNPQ)
Black	Disqualified (DSQ)
White	Did not start (DNS)
White	Withdrew (WD)
White	Race cancelled (C)
Blank	Did not practice (DNP)
Blank	Did not arrive (DNA)
Blank	Excluded (EX)

**Bold** – Pole
Italics – Fastest Lap
† — Did not finish, but classified

=== Rookies' championship ===
Pos	Driver	ZZIC (China)			MAC (Macau)		SEP1 (Malaysia)			SEP2 (Malaysia)			Pts
Pos	Driver	R1	R2	R3	QR	FR	R1	R2	R3	R1	R2	R3	Pts
1	(France) Doriane Pin						5	2	3	1	2	1	111
2	(China) Kevin Xiao	3	1	1	2	Ret	6	5	8	5	Ret	7	103
3	(Chinese Taipei) Enzo Yeh				1	1	1	1	4	3	8	6	89
4	(United Kingdom) Kean Nakamura-Berta						2	4	1	2	Ret	8	77
5	(Australia) Nicolas Stati						7	6	9	4	1	4	65
6	(China) Zhang Yu	1	2	2						9	Ret	DNS	63
7	(Hong Kong) Vivian Siu	2	3	3	3	2							48
8	(Latvia) Tomass Štolcermanis						3	3	2				48
9	(Australia) Peter Bouzinelos						10	7	6	7	6	2	47
10	(Australia) Lincoln Taylor									10	3	3	31
11	(China) Yuhao Fu						8	Ret	7	6	5	Ret	28
12	(Philippines) Iñigo Anton									8	4	5	26
13	(India) Arjun Chheda						4	Ret	Ret				12
14	(Philippines) Joaquin Garrido						9	Ret	5				12
15	(China) Lu Ye									11	7	DNS	6
Pos	Driver	R1	R2	R3	QR	FR	R1	R2	R3	R1	R2	R3	Pts
Pos	Driver	ZZIC (China)			MAC (Macau)		SEP1 (Malaysia)			SEP2 (Malaysia)			Pts

=== Teams' Championship ===
Ahead of each event, the teams nominated two drivers that accumulated teams' points.

Pos	Team	Points
1	(Australia) AGI Sport	148
2	(China) Asia Racing Team	148
3	(Italy) Prema Racing	130
4	(France) R-ace GP	103
5	(China) R&B Racing	77
6	(Hong Kong) BlackArts Racing	62
7	(Republic of Ireland) Pinnacle Motorsport	56
8	(Chinese Taipei) Team KRC	19
9	(Hong Kong) H-Star Racing	12
10	(Japan) B-Max Racing Team	2
