= Jack Beeton =

Australian racing driver (born 2007)

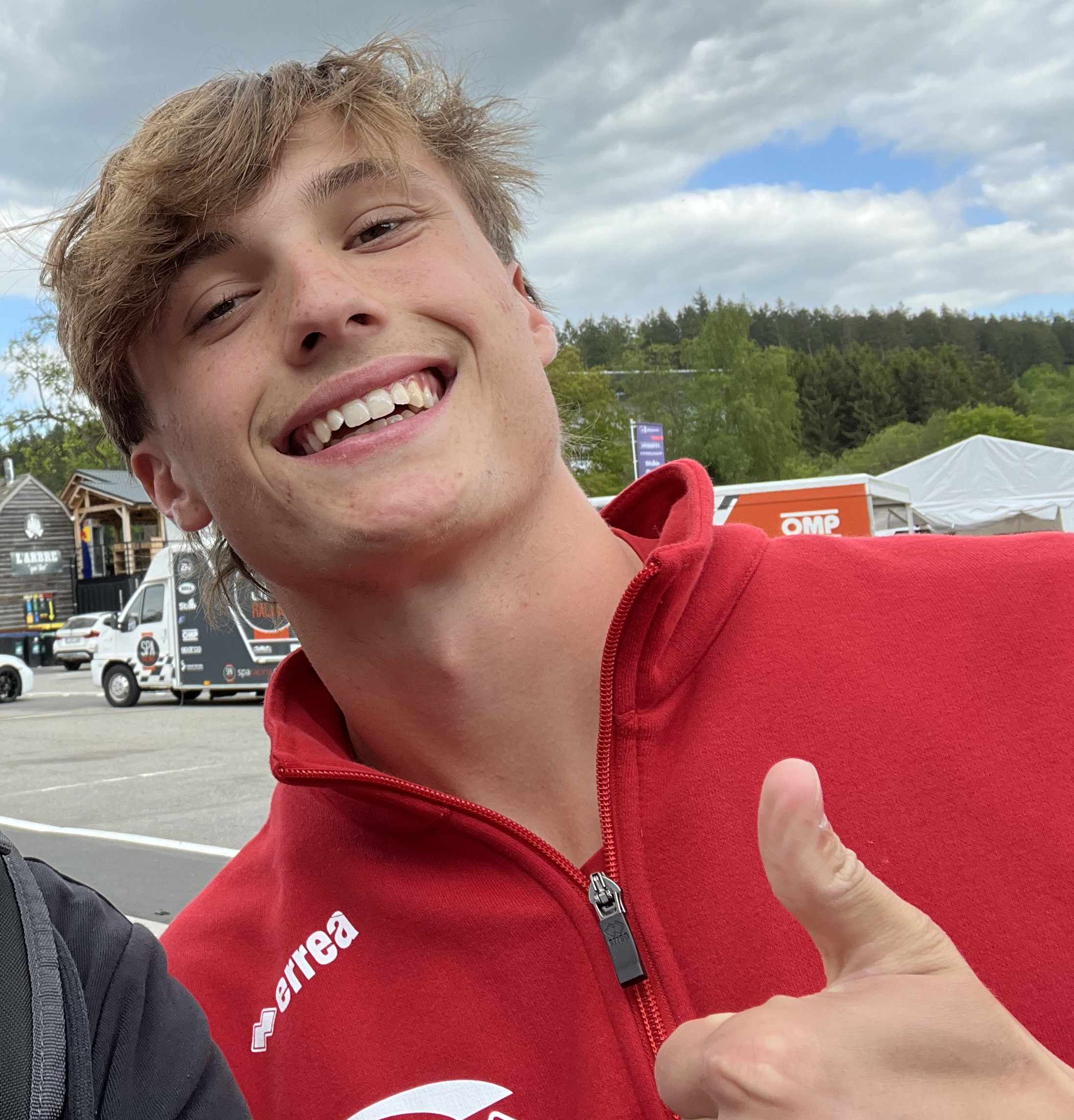
- Beeton in 2025
- Nationality: (Australia) Australian
- Born: 17 November 2007 (age 18) Manly, Sydney, Australia

Formula Regional European Championship career
- Debut season: 2023
- Current team: US Racing
- Car number: 45
- Starts: 19
- Wins: 18
- Podiums: 19
- Poles: 7
- Fastest laps: 2
- Best finish: 13th in 2025

Previous series
- 2025; 2025; 2024; 2023–2024; 2023–2024; 2023–2024; 2023: FR European; FR Middle East; Formula Winter Series; Euro 4; Italian F4; F4 UAE; F4 South East Asia

Championship titles
- 2023: F4 South East Asia

Jack Beeton (born 17 November 2007) is an Australian racing driver who currently competes in Indy NXT with HMD Motorsports.

Born in Manly, Sydney, and raised on the Gold Coast, Beeton was the 2023 Formula 4 South East Asia Champion and the 2024 Italian F4 vice-champion. He then moved up to Formula Regional Europe for 2025 with Prema.

In 2026, Beeton pivoted to chasing his long held dream of racing Indycars, switching stateside to contest the Indy NXT in 2026 for the championship-winning HMD Motorsports team based in Brownsburg, Indiana.

== Career ==
=== Karting ===
Beeton competed in the Australian Kart Championship from the 2020 season onwards, and his best result in the championship was 6th in the KA4 Junior category in 2022.

=== Formula 4 ===
==== 2022 ====
In late 2022, Beeton had the chance to impress the Ferrari Driver Academy, and win a place in the scouting world finals. He won the Asia Pacific and Oceania Selection Program alongside fellow Aussie Gianmarco Pradel, to make it to the world finals. He lined up alongside Pradel and four other finalists in the finals, and was the youngest driver selected.

==== 2023 ====
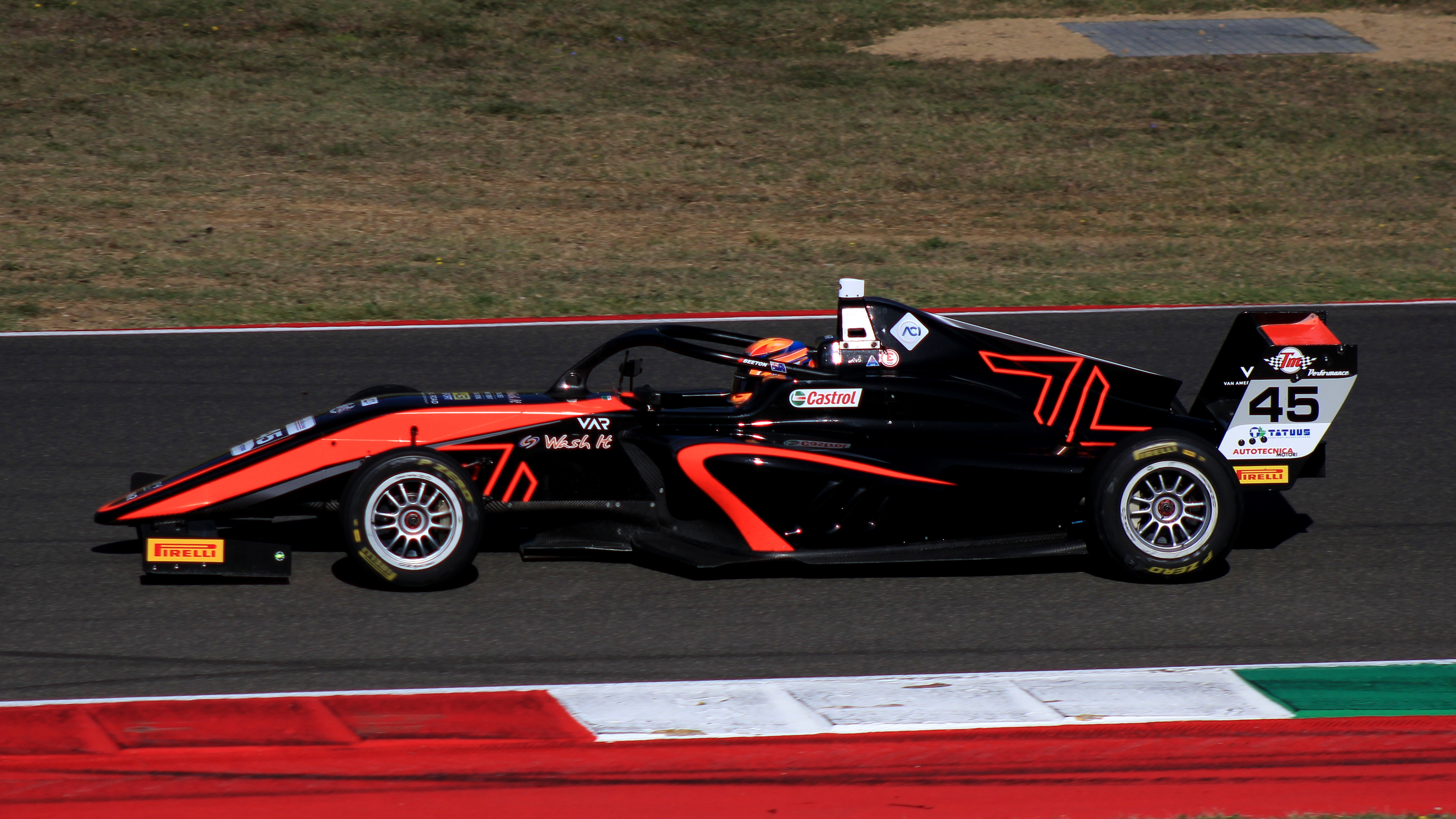
Beeton driving at the Mugello Circuit during the 2023 Italian F4 Championship

After showing his quality in the scouting world finals, Beeton was announced to be driving in F4 UAE for Pinnacle VAR. Beeton had a tough rookie year, and he only scored one points finish as he ended the campaign in 23rd. Beeton then went to Europe and was signed by VAR for the full Italian F4 season. Beeton went on to finish 23rd in the championship, scoring just two points in his debut season with a best result of ninth. Beeton then ended the season back in Asia as he joined AGI Sport for the 2023 Formula 4 South East Asia Championship. Beeton had an outstanding season, winning the title by a considerable margin. He scored 130 points and managed a total of five podiums from nine races.

==== 2024 ====
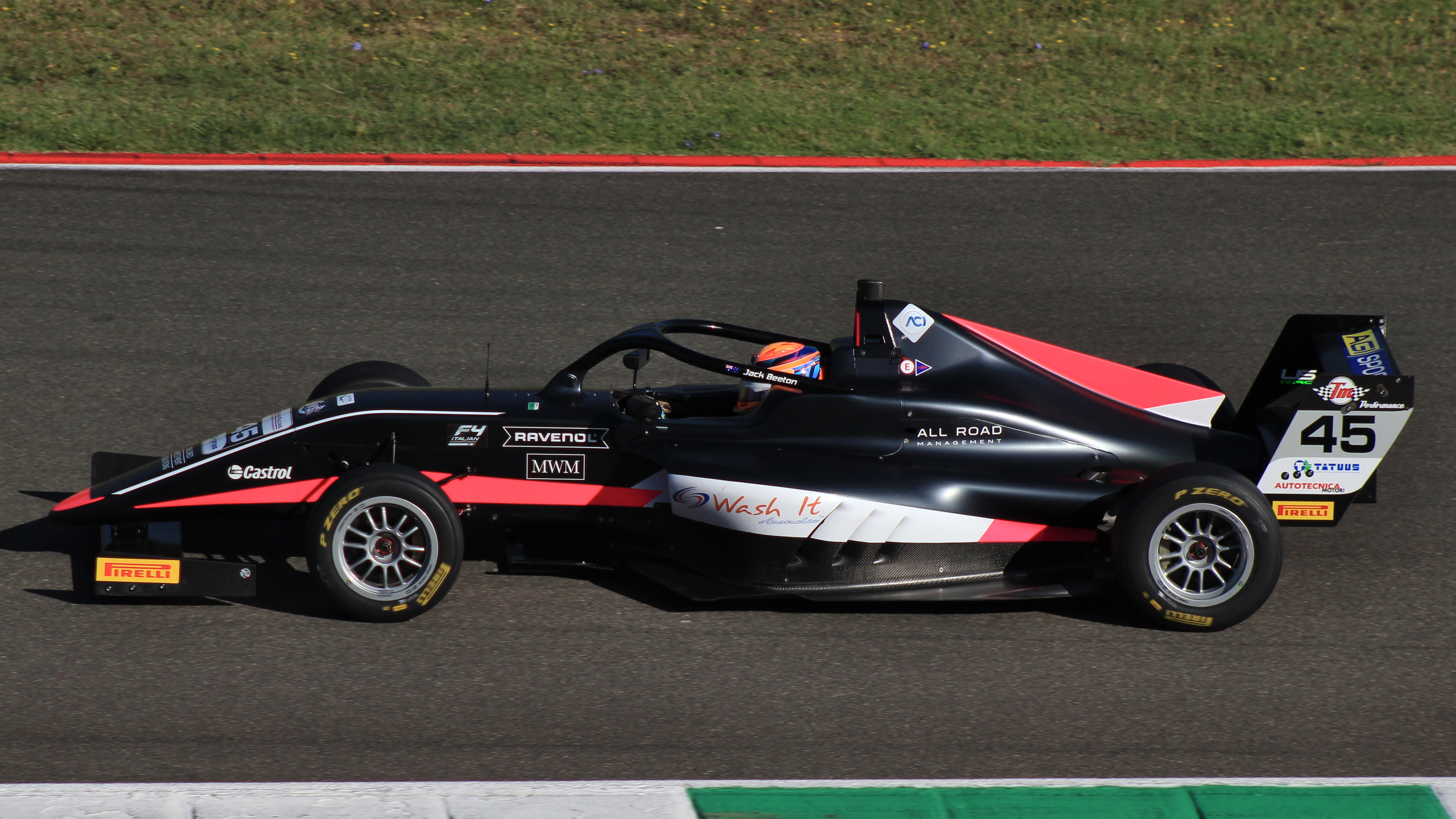
Beeton driving at the Mugello Circuit during the 2024 Italian F4 Championship

Beeton opted to continue his successful journey with AGI as the team entered the 2024 Formula 4 UAE Championship. The combination had a largely successful season in the championship, scoring two podiums as Beeton finished 12th in the championship against vastly more experienced teams. Beeton then contested the remaining two rounds of the Formula Winter Series, with his new team US Racing, who would also partner him for the Italian F4 and Euro 4 seasons. Beeton had a very successful two round stint in FWS, scoring 52 points and standing on the podium three times in five races.

In Italian F4, in a season largely dominated by Freddie Slater, Beeton experienced a slow start to the season, but scored his first podium at the final race in Imola. This was followed by a first pole in the next round in Vallelunga, which he followed up with second place. After six more second places, Beeton finally broke his duck with a maiden Italian F4 win during the final race in Barcelona. With a double podium in the Monza finale, Beeton would be classified second in the standings, having scored one win, two poles and ten podiums. His Euro 4 campaign was less successful, as Beeton only yielded one podium in nine races, putting him eighth in the standings.

=== Formula Regional ===
==== 2025 ====
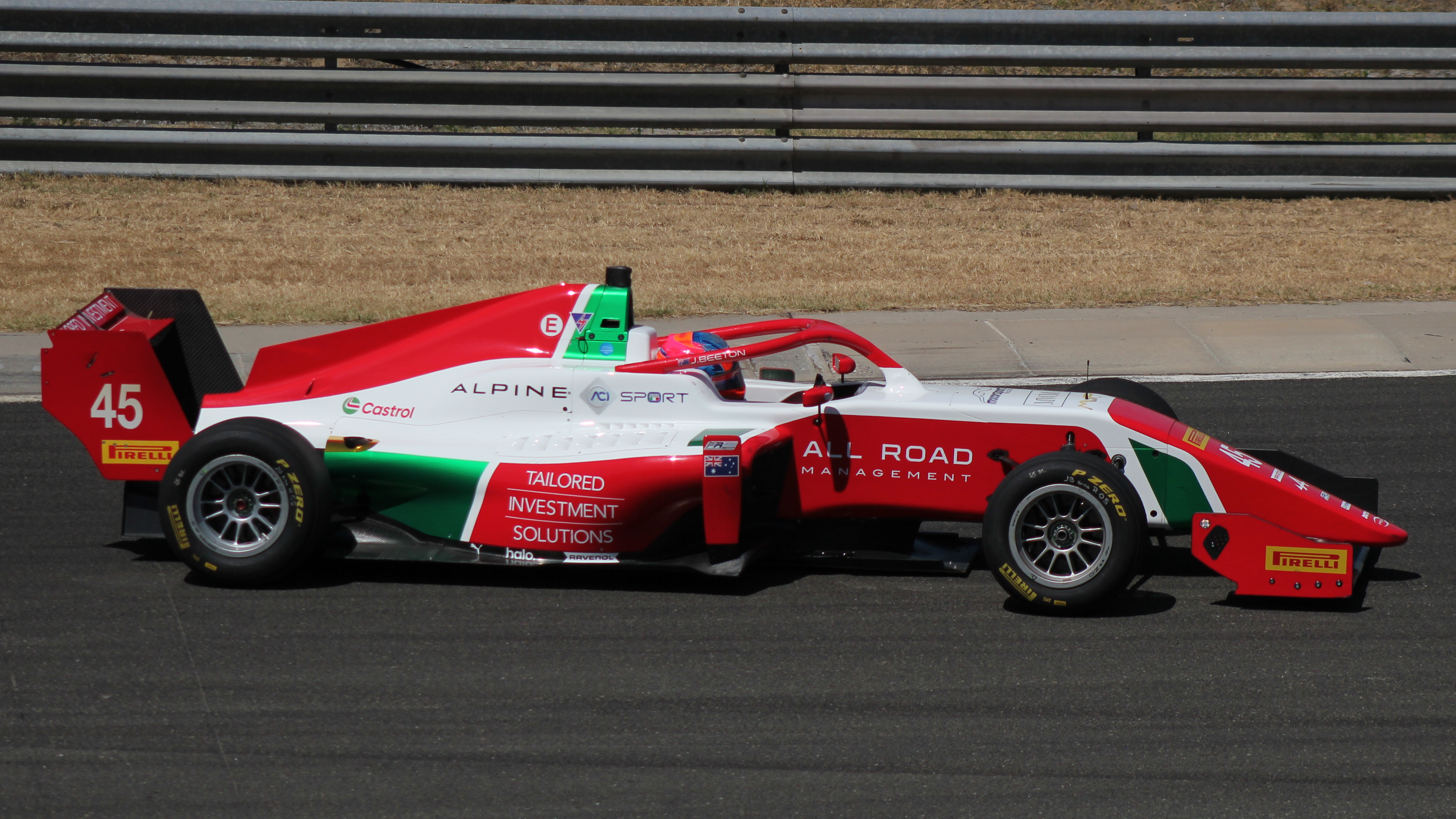
Beeton driving at the Hungaroring during the 2025 Formula Regional European Championship

In preparation for a full Formula Regional campaign, Beeton contested in the Formula Regional Middle East Championship for Mumbai Falcons.

Beeton then raced in the Formula Regional European Championship with Prema Racing, being partnered alongside his Italian F4 rivals Freddie Slater and Rashid Al Dhaheri.

=== Indy NXT ===
In October 2025, Beeton partook in an Indy NXT test with HMD Motorsports at the Indianapolis Motor Speedway.

==== 2026 ====
Shortly after the test, Beeton was signed by HMD Motorsports to compete for them during the full 2026 Indy NXT season.

== Karting record ==
=== Karting career summary ===
Season	Series	Position
2018	Race of Stars - Cadet 12	24th
2018	Lismore Young Guns - Cadet 12	10th
2019	Race of Stars - Cadet 12	29th
2020	Australian Kart Championship - Cadet 12	63rd
2021	Australian Kart Championship - KA4 Junior	10th
2022	Australian Kart Championship - KA4 Junior	6th
Sources: 2

== Racing record ==
=== Racing career summary ===
Season	Series	Team	Races	Wins	Poles	F/Laps	Podiums	Points	Position
2022	Victoria Formula Open Championship		2	0	0	0	0	0	NC
2022	Australian Formula 3 Championship	AGI Sport	2	0	0	0	0	0	NC
2023	Formula 4 UAE Championship	Pinnacle VAR	15	0	0	0	0	6	23rd
2023	Italian F4 Championship	Van Amersfoort Racing	20	0	0	0	0	2	23rd
2023	Euro 4 Championship	Van Amersfoort Racing	3	0	0	0	0	6	15th
2023	Formula 4 South East Asia Championship	AGI Sport	9	2	2	2	5	130	**1st**
2023	Macau Formula 4 Race	AGI Sport	2	0	0	0	0	N/A	4th
2024	Formula 4 UAE Championship	AGI Sport	15	0	0	0	2	52	12th
2024	Formula Winter Series	US Racing	5	0	0	0	3	52	10th
2024	Italian F4 Championship	US Racing	21	1	2	3	10	222	**2nd**
2024	Euro 4 Championship	US Racing	9	0	0	0	1	51	8th
2025	Formula Regional Middle East Championship	Mumbai Falcons Racing Limited	15	1	0	0	2	65	13th
2025	Formula Regional European Championship	Prema Racing	19	0	0	0	0	32	13th
2026	Indy NXT	HMD Motorsports	17	0	0	1	3	382	9th

=== Complete Formula 4 UAE Championship results ===
(key) (Races in bold indicate pole position) (Races in italics indicate fastest lap)

Year	Team	1	2	3	4	5	6	7	8	9	10	11	12	13	14	15	DC	Points
2023	Pinnacle VAR	DUB1; 1; 20	DUB1; 2; 18	DUB1; 3; 31	KMT1; 1; 16	KMT1; 2; 20	KMT1; 3; 21	KMT2; 1; 25	KMT2; 2; 27	KMT2; 3; 31	DUB2; 1; 18	DUB2; 2; 7	DUB2; 3 Ret	YMC; 1 Ret	YMC; 2; 19	YMC; 3; 19	23rd	6
2024	AGI Sport	YMC1; 1; 12	YMC1; 2; 3	YMC1; 3; 27	YMC2; 1; 17	YMC2; 2; 17	YMC2; 3 Ret	DUB1; 1; 6	DUB1; 2; 3	DUB1; 3; 12	YMC3; 1; 14	YMC3; 2; 22	YMC3; 3; 19	DUB2; 1; 4	DUB2; 2; 10	DUB2; 3; 10	12th	52

=== Complete Italian F4 Championship results ===
(key) (Races in bold indicate pole position) (Races in italics indicate fastest lap)

Year	Team	1	2	3	4	5	6	7	8	9	10	11	12	13	14	15	16	17	18	19	20	21	22	DC	Points
2023	Van Amersfoort Racing	IMO; 1	IMO; 2; 13	IMO; 3; 10	IMO; 4; 26	MIS; 1; 17	MIS; 2; 17	MIS; 3 Ret	SPA; 1; 28	SPA; 2 DSQ	SPA; 3 EX	MNZ; 1; 18	MNZ; 2; 16	MNZ; 3; 10	LEC; 1; 17	LEC; 2 Ret	LEC; 3; 32†	MUG; 1; 21	MUG; 2; 14	MUG; 3; 14	VLL; 1; 13	VLL; 2 Ret	VLL; 3; 11	23rd	2
2024	US Racing	MIS; 1; 5	MIS; 2 Ret	MIS; 3; 17	IMO; 1; 4	IMO; 2; 35†	IMO; 3; 2	**VLL**; **1**; 2	VLL; 2; 17	VLL; 3; 5	MUG; 1; 2	MUG; 2; 13	MUG; 3; 2	LEC; 1; 2	LEC; 2; 2	LEC; 3; 33†	CAT; 1; 2	CAT; 2 Ret	CAT; 3; 1	**MNZ**; **1**; 2	MNZ; 2; 3	MNZ; 3; 7		2nd	222

=== Complete Euro 4 Championship results ===
(key) (Races in bold indicate pole position; races in italics indicate fastest lap)

Year	Team	1	2	3	4	5	6	7	8	9	DC	Points
2023	Van Amersfoort Racing	MUG; 1; 18	MUG; 2; 7	MUG; 3 Ret	MNZ; 1 WD	MNZ; 2 WD	MNZ; 3 WD	CAT; 1	CAT; 2	CAT; 3	15th	6
2024	US Racing	MUG; 1 Ret	MUG; 2; 4	MUG; 3; 2	RBR; 1 Ret	RBR; 2; 25	RBR; 3 Ret	MNZ; 1; 10	MNZ; 2; 4	MNZ; 3; 6	8th	51

=== Complete Formula 4 South East Asia Championship results ===
(key) (Races in bold indicate pole position; races in italics indicate fastest lap)

Year	Entrant	1	2	3	4	5	6	7	8	9	10	11	Pos	Points
2023	AGI Sport	**ZZIC1**; **1**; 1	ZZIC1; 2 Ret	**ZZIC1**; **3**; 1	MAC; 1; 5	MAC; 2; 4	SEP1; 1; 3	SEP1; 2; 5	SEP1; 3; 4	SEP2; 1; 2	SEP2; 2; 3	SEP2; 3; 5	1st	130

=== Complete Formula Winter Series results ===
(key) (Races in bold indicate pole position; races in italics indicate fastest lap)

Year	Team	1	2	3	4	5	6	7	8	9	10	11	12	DC	Points
2024	US Racing	JER; 1	JER; 2	JER; 3	CRT; 1	CRT; 2	CRT; 3	ARA; 1; 2	ARA; 2; 3	ARA; 3; 2	CAT; 1 C	CAT; 2; 10	CAT; 3; 30	10th	52

=== Complete Formula Regional Middle East Championship results ===
(key) (Races in bold indicate pole position) (Races in italics indicate fastest lap)

Year	Entrant	1	2	3	4	5	6	7	8	9	10	11	12	13	14	15	DC	Points
2025	Mumbai Falcons Racing Limited	YMC1; 1; 17	YMC1; 2 Ret	YMC1; 3; 14	YMC2; 1; 8	YMC2; 2; 3	YMC2; 3; 14	DUB; 1; 12	DUB; 2; 11	DUB; 3; 22	YMC3; 1; 13	YMC3; 2 Ret	YMC3; 3; 8	LUS; 1; 11	LUS; 2 Ret	LUS; 3; 1	13th	65

=== Complete Formula Regional European Championship results ===
(key) (Races in bold indicate pole position) (Races in italics indicate fastest lap)

Year	Team	1	2	3	4	5	6	7	8	9	10	11	12	13	14	15	16	17	18	19	20	DC	Points
2025	Prema Racing	MIS; 1; 6	MIS; 2; 7	SPA; 1; 8	SPA; 2; 10	ZAN; 1; 9	ZAN; 2; 17	HUN; 1; 14	HUN; 2 Ret	LEC; 1; 10	LEC; 2 Ret	IMO; 1; 21	IMO; 2 Ret	RBR; 1; 23	RBR; 2; 6	CAT; 1; 9	CAT; 2; 11	HOC; 1; 18	HOC; 2; 14	MNZ; 1 Ret	MNZ; 2 DNS	13th	32

=== American open–wheel results ===
==== Indy NXT ====
(key) (Races in bold indicate pole position) (Races in italics indicate fastest lap) (Races with ^{L} indicate a race lap led) (Races with * indicate most race laps led)

Year	Team	1	2	3	4	5	6	7	8	9	10	11	12	13	14	15	16	17	Rank	Points
2026	HMD Motorsports	STP; 11	ARL; 15	BAR; 9	BAR; 9	IMS; 21	IMS; 13	DET; 13	GAT; 11	ROA; 4	ROA; 6	MOH; 3	MOH; 2	NSS; 8	POR; 13	MIL; 3	LAG; 19	LAG; 10	9th	382

Sporting positions
Preceded by Lucca Allen	Formula 4 South East Asia Championship; Champion; 2023	Succeeded by Incumbent
