= 2024 Formula 4 UAE Championship =

Motor racing competition

The 2024 Formula 4 UAE Championship was the eighth season of the Formula 4 UAE Championship, and the last under this moniker before the change of the branding to F4 Middle East Championship in 2025. It was a motor racing series for the United Arab Emirates, regulated according to FIA Formula 4 regulations and organised and promoted by the Emirates Motorsport Organization (EMSO) and Top Speed.

The regular season commenced on 12 January at the Yas Marina Circuit and concluded on 18 February at the Dubai Autodrome.

== Teams and drivers ==
Team	No.	Drivers	Class	Rounds
(United Arab Emirates) Xcel Motorsport	2	(United Kingdom) Noah Lisle (Note: Lisle is an Australian driver competing under a British licence.)		TR
(United Arab Emirates) Xcel Motorsport	2	(Hong Kong) Kaishun Liu		1–2, 4–5
(United Arab Emirates) Xcel Motorsport	3	(Macau) Tiago Rodrigues		All
(United Arab Emirates) Xcel Motorsport	5	(France) Laura Villars (Note: Villars is a French-Swiss driver competing under a French licence.)	R	TR
(United Arab Emirates) Xcel Motorsport	12	(United Kingdom) Josh Irfan		TR
(United Arab Emirates) Xcel Motorsport	20	(Switzerland) Tina Hausmann		2
(United Arab Emirates) Xcel Motorsport	33	(Kyrgyzstan) Georgy Zhuravskiy (Note: Zhuravskiy is Russian, but he competes under a Kyrgyz licence as Russian national emblems were banned by the FIA following the Russian invasion of Ukraine. Bedrin and Popov, also Russians, compete under an Italian licence for the same reason.)		TR
(United Arab Emirates) Xcel Motorsport	35	(Italy) Alvise Rodella		All
(United Arab Emirates) Xcel Motorsport	55	(United Kingdom) Dion Gowda (Note: Gowda is an Indian driver competing under a British licence.)		TR
(United Arab Emirates) Xcel Motorsport	56	(China) Yuanpu Cui	R	2–5
(United Arab Emirates) Xcel Motorsport	71	(United Arab Emirates) Federico Al Rifai		TR
(United Arab Emirates) X GP	2	(Hong Kong) Kaishun Liu		3
(United Arab Emirates) X GP	24	(Luxembourg) Chester Kieffer	R	3
(United Arab Emirates) Yas Heat Racing Academy	3	(United Arab Emirates) Zack Scoular	R	TR
(United Arab Emirates) Yas Heat Racing Academy	23	(United Arab Emirates) Zack Scoular	R	All
(United Arab Emirates) Yas Heat Racing Academy	11	(United Arab Emirates) Keanu Al Azhari		TR, All
(United Kingdom) Hitech Pulse-Eight	4	(United Kingdom) Reza Seewooruthun	R	All
(United Kingdom) Hitech Pulse-Eight	5	(United Kingdom) Sebastian Murray		All
(United Kingdom) Hitech Pulse-Eight	6	(United Kingdom) Gabriel Stilp		All
(United Kingdom) Hitech Pulse-Eight	7	(United Kingdom) Deagen Fairclough		All
(Netherlands) MP Motorsport	7	(United Arab Emirates) Hamda Al Qubaisi		TR
(Netherlands) MP Motorsport	8	(United Arab Emirates) Amna Al Qubaisi		TR
(France) R-ace GP	8	(Finland) Luka Sammalisto	R	All
(France) R-ace GP	22	(Spain) Enzo Deligny (Note: Deligny is a French driver competing under a Spanish licence.)		3–5
(France) R-ace GP	76	(France) Raphaël Narac		1–3
(France) R-ace GP	77	(Italy) Enzo Yeh (Note: Yeh is a Taiwanese driver competing under an Italian licence.)	R	All
(France) R-ace GP	83	(France) Jules Caranta	R	1–2, 4–5
(Germany) PHM AIX Racing	9	(United States) Everett Stack		All
(Germany) PHM AIX Racing	10	(Italy) Nikita Bedrin		1–3
(Germany) PHM AIX Racing	19	(Italy) Davide Larini		4–5
(Germany) PHM AIX Racing	33	(Italy) Maksimilian Popov	R	All
(Germany) PHM AIX Racing	70	(Australia) Kamal Mrad	R	All
(Italy) Prema Racing	14	(United Arab Emirates) Rashid Al Dhaheri		TR, All
(Italy) Prema Racing	27	(United Kingdom) Freddie Slater		TR
(Italy) Prema Racing	28	(France) Doriane Pin	R	1–4
(Italy) Prema Racing	78	(Latvia) Tomass Štolcermanis	R	4–5
(Italy) Prema Racing	80	(Jamaica) Alex Powell	R	TR
(Australia) AGI Sport	15	(Australia) Nicolas Stati	R	All
(Australia) AGI Sport	16	(Germany) Carrie Schreiner		1–2, 5
(Australia) AGI Sport	45	(Australia) Jack Beeton		All
(Australia) AGI Sport	46	(Australia) Peter Bouzinelos	R	1–2
(France) Saintéloc Racing	17	(Colombia) Maximiliano Restrepo		All
(France) Saintéloc Racing	21	(Sri Lanka) Yevan David	R	All
(France) Saintéloc Racing	40	(Brazil) Aurelia Nobels		1–2
(France) Saintéloc Racing	76	(France) Raphaël Narac		4–5
(France) Saintéloc Racing	83	(France) Jules Caranta	R	3
(France) Saintéloc Racing	93	(United Arab Emirates) Matteo Quintarelli		All
(United Kingdom) Rodin Carlin	17	(United Kingdom) Jessica Edgar		TR
(India) Mumbai Falcons Racing Limited	27	(United Kingdom) Freddie Slater		All
(India) Mumbai Falcons Racing Limited	51	(United Kingdom) Kean Nakamura-Berta (Note: Nakamura-Berta is a Japanese-Slovak driver competing under a British licence.)	R	All
(India) Mumbai Falcons Racing Limited	55	(United Kingdom) Dion Gowda		All
(India) Mumbai Falcons Racing Limited	80	(United States) Alex Powell (Note: Powell is a Jamaican-American driver competing under an American licence.)	R	All
(Republic of Ireland) Pinnacle Motorsport	66	(Japan) Hiyu Yamakoshi		4
(Republic of Ireland) Pinnacle Motorsport	88	(United Kingdom) Kai Daryanani (Note: Daryanani is an Indian driver competing under a British licence.)		All
(Republic of Ireland) Pinnacle Motorsport	99	(China) Yuhao Fu	R	All

Icon	Legend
R	Rookie

- R2Race Cavicel was scheduled to enter the championship, but did not appear in any rounds.

== Race calendar ==
The schedule consisted of 15 races over 5 rounds. Prior to start of the season, a non-championship Trophy Round was held in support of the 2023 Abu Dhabi Grand Prix. The two days preceding the Trophy Round have been scheduled as pre-season test days.

Round		Circuit	Date	Pole position	Fastest lap	Winning driver	Winning team	Rookie winner	Supporting
2023
TR	R1	(United Arab Emirates) Yas Marina Circuit, Abu Dhabi (Grand Prix Circuit)	25 November	(United Arab Emirates) Keanu Al Azhari	(United Arab Emirates) Federico Al Rifai	(United Arab Emirates) Keanu Al Azhari	(United Arab Emirates) Yas Heat Racing Academy	(United States) Alex Powell	Formula One World Championship
TR	R2	(United Arab Emirates) Yas Marina Circuit, Abu Dhabi (Grand Prix Circuit)	26 November	(United Arab Emirates) Keanu Al Azhari	(United Arab Emirates) Keanu Al Azhari	(United Arab Emirates) Keanu Al Azhari	(United Arab Emirates) Yas Heat Racing Academy	(United States) Alex Powell	Formula One World Championship
2024
1	R1	(United Arab Emirates) Yas Marina Circuit, Abu Dhabi (Corkscrew Circuit)	13 January	(United Arab Emirates) Keanu Al Azhari	(United Kingdom) Kean Nakamura-Berta	(United Kingdom) Kean Nakamura-Berta	(India) Mumbai Falcons Racing Limited	(United Kingdom) Kean Nakamura-Berta	Formula Regional Middle East Championship; Clio Cup Middle East
1	R2	(United Arab Emirates) Yas Marina Circuit, Abu Dhabi (Corkscrew Circuit)	14 January		(United Kingdom) Freddie Slater	(Italy) Nikita Bedrin	(Germany) PHM AIX Racing	(France) Jules Caranta	Formula Regional Middle East Championship; Clio Cup Middle East
1	R3	(United Arab Emirates) Yas Marina Circuit, Abu Dhabi (Corkscrew Circuit)	14 January	(United Arab Emirates) Keanu Al Azhari	(United Arab Emirates) Keanu Al Azhari	(United Kingdom) Freddie Slater	(India) Mumbai Falcons Racing Limited	(United Kingdom) Kean Nakamura-Berta	Formula Regional Middle East Championship; Clio Cup Middle East
2	R1	(United Arab Emirates) Yas Marina Circuit, Abu Dhabi (Grand Prix Circuit)	20 January	(United States) Alex Powell	(United Kingdom) Freddie Slater	(United Kingdom) Freddie Slater	(India) Mumbai Falcons Racing Limited	(United States) Alex Powell	Middle East Trophy; Formula Regional Middle East Championship; Gulf Radical Cup
2	R2	(United Arab Emirates) Yas Marina Circuit, Abu Dhabi (Grand Prix Circuit)	20 January		(United Kingdom) Freddie Slater	(United Arab Emirates) Keanu Al Azhari	(United Arab Emirates) Yas Heat Racing Academy	(United Kingdom) Kean Nakamura-Berta	Middle East Trophy; Formula Regional Middle East Championship; Gulf Radical Cup
2	R3	(United Arab Emirates) Yas Marina Circuit, Abu Dhabi (Grand Prix Circuit)	21 January	(United Arab Emirates) Keanu Al Azhari	(United Arab Emirates) Keanu Al Azhari	(United Arab Emirates) Keanu Al Azhari	(United Arab Emirates) Yas Heat Racing Academy	(United Kingdom) Kean Nakamura-Berta	Middle East Trophy; Formula Regional Middle East Championship; Gulf Radical Cup
3	R1	(United Arab Emirates) Dubai Autodrome, Dubai (Grand Prix Circuit)	3 February	(Italy) Nikita Bedrin	(United Kingdom) Freddie Slater	(Italy) Nikita Bedrin	(Germany) PHM AIX Racing	(United Kingdom) Kean Nakamura-Berta	Asian Le Mans Series; Formula Regional Middle East Championship
3	R2	(United Arab Emirates) Dubai Autodrome, Dubai (Grand Prix Circuit)	3 February		(United States) Alex Powell	(United States) Alex Powell	(India) Mumbai Falcons Racing Limited	(United States) Alex Powell	Asian Le Mans Series; Formula Regional Middle East Championship
3	R3	(United Arab Emirates) Dubai Autodrome, Dubai (Grand Prix Circuit)	4 February	(Italy) Nikita Bedrin	(United Arab Emirates) Keanu Al Azhari	(Italy) Nikita Bedrin	(Germany) PHM AIX Racing	(United Kingdom) Kean Nakamura-Berta	Asian Le Mans Series; Formula Regional Middle East Championship
4	R1	(United Arab Emirates) Yas Marina Circuit, Abu Dhabi (Grand Prix Circuit)	10 February	(France) Doriane Pin	(France) Doriane Pin	(France) Doriane Pin (Note: Kean Nakamura-Berta originally won the race but was given a 5-second penalty for a jump start. Pin inherited the win.)	(Italy) Prema Racing	(France) Doriane Pin	Asian Le Mans Series; Formula Regional Middle East Championship; Renault Clio Cup Middle East
4	R2	(United Arab Emirates) Yas Marina Circuit, Abu Dhabi (Grand Prix Circuit)	11 February		(United Arab Emirates) Keanu Al Azhari	(United Kingdom) Gabriel Stilp	(United Kingdom) Hitech Pulse-Eight	(United Kingdom) Reza Seewooruthun	Asian Le Mans Series; Formula Regional Middle East Championship; Renault Clio Cup Middle East
4	R3	(United Arab Emirates) Yas Marina Circuit, Abu Dhabi (Grand Prix Circuit)	11 February	(United Arab Emirates) Rashid Al Dhaheri	(United Arab Emirates) Keanu Al Azhari	(United Arab Emirates) Rashid Al Dhaheri	(Italy) Prema Racing	(United Kingdom) Reza Seewooruthun	Asian Le Mans Series; Formula Regional Middle East Championship; Renault Clio Cup Middle East
5	R1	(United Arab Emirates) Dubai Autodrome, Dubai (Grand Prix Circuit)	17 February	(United Kingdom) Kean Nakamura-Berta	(United Kingdom) Kean Nakamura-Berta	(United Kingdom) Kean Nakamura-Berta	(India) Mumbai Falcons Racing Limited	(United Kingdom) Kean Nakamura-Berta	Formula Regional Middle East Championship; Gulf Radical Cup
5	R2	(United Arab Emirates) Dubai Autodrome, Dubai (Grand Prix Circuit)	18 February		(United Arab Emirates) Keanu Al Azhari	(Spain) Enzo Deligny	(France) R-ace GP	(Latvia) Tomass Štolcermanis	Formula Regional Middle East Championship; Gulf Radical Cup
5	R3	(United Arab Emirates) Dubai Autodrome, Dubai (Grand Prix Circuit)	18 February	(United Kingdom) Kean Nakamura-Berta	(United Kingdom) Kean Nakamura-Berta	(United Arab Emirates) Rashid Al Dhaheri	(Italy) Prema Racing	(United Kingdom) Kean Nakamura-Berta	Formula Regional Middle East Championship; Gulf Radical Cup

== Championship standings ==
Points were awarded to the top 10 classified finishers in each race.

Position	**1st**	**2nd**	**3rd**	**4th**	**5th**	**6th**	**7th**	**8th**	**9th**	**10th**
Points	25	18	15	12	10	8	6	4	2	1

=== Drivers' Championship ===
Pos	Driver	YMC TR		YMC1			YMC2			DUB1			YMC3			DUB2			Pts
Pos	Driver	YMC TR		R1	R2	R3	R1	R2	R3	R1	R2	R3	R1	R2	R3	R1	R2	R3	Pts
1	(United Kingdom) Freddie Slater	3	5	3	4	1	1	3	2	4	10	4	Ret	14	30†	5	4	3	172
2	(United Kingdom) Kean Nakamura-Berta			1	8	5	12	2	3	2	6	3	5	Ret	Ret	**1**	9	**2**	168
3	(United Arab Emirates) Keanu Al Azhari	**1**	**1**	**2**	30†	**2**	10	1	**1**	5	2	2	Ret	12	3	9	5	8	164
4	(United Arab Emirates) Rashid Al Dhaheri	4	3	5	18	3	4	4	22	Ret	7	27	2	6	**1**	2	8	1	153
5	(Italy) Nikita Bedrin			9	1	7	3	5	7	**1**	5	**1**							124
6	(United States) Alex Powell	7	6	4	10	14	**2**	6	23	10	1	8	3	7	23	3	11	DNS	105
7	(United Kingdom) Deagen Fairclough			7	2	4	13	15	4	Ret	Ret	25	Ret	23	6	8	3	Ret	75
8	(Spain) Enzo Deligny									11	Ret	6	4	9	2	11	1	6	73
9	(United Kingdom) Gabriel Stilp			17	9	24	6	7	5	9	24	9	7	1	4	31	Ret	19	73
10	(France) Doriane Pin			8	20	6	5	24	6	7	13	16	**1**	10	8				66
11	(United Kingdom) Dion Gowda	9	7	6	Ret	Ret	11	Ret	Ret	3	4	11	6	26†	5	14	12	4	65
12	(Australia) Jack Beeton			12	3	27	17	17	Ret	6	3	12	14	22	19	4	10	10	52
13	(United Arab Emirates) Matteo Quintarelli			11	5	8	7	25	13	Ret	15	Ret	8	4	20	17	14	7	42
14	(Italy) Enzo Yeh			15	Ret	10	Ret	Ret	10	23	9	Ret	12	3	11	6	32	5	37
15	(France) Jules Caranta			16	7	28	Ret	13	8	17	12	7	9	8	10	7	7	9	37
16	(United Kingdom) Reza Seewooruthun			23	14	16	24	12	17	18	25	Ret	11	2	7	24	22	17	24
17	(United Arab Emirates) Zack Scoular	12	12	13	11	9	9	8	9	29	Ret	5	30†	Ret	14	13	13	11	20
18	(Latvia) Tomass Štolcermanis												25	16	Ret	10	2	Ret	19
19	(United Kingdom) Sebastian Murray			18	12	18	15	14	Ret	30	14	10	10	5	21	20	25	16	12
20	(Finland) Luka Sammalisto			20	22	17	Ret	26	19	20	8	17	18	13	12	12	6	15	12
21	(Italy) Alvise Rodella			10	6	Ret	23	10	Ret	12	17	Ret	13	Ret	26	30	27	12	10
22	(Macau) Tiago Rodrigues			19	13	15	30	Ret	15	8	11	26	22	28†	15	15	19	22	4
23	(France) Raphaël Narac			21	Ret	12	8	16	12	13	26	20	17	15	Ret	26	26	Ret	4
24	(China) Yuanpu Cui						28	28†	11	21	27	24	20	11	9	21	21	20	2
25	(United Kingdom) Kai Daryanani			22	16	29†	16	9	27	27	22	14	23	25	22	Ret	23	18	2
26	(Sri Lanka) Yevan David			14	19	11	22	18	16	16	16	13	16	27†	13	19	15	14	0
27	(Italy) Maksimilian Popov			26	17	22	14	11	14	24	20	23	28	19	25	18	16	26	0
28	(Australia) Kamal Mrad			27	15	13	18	29†	Ret	14	19	15	15	18	29†	25	18	13	0
29	(Luxembourg) Chester Kieffer									15	28	Ret							0
30	(Italy) Davide Larini												19	20	17	16	17	28	0
31	(Hong Kong) Kaishun Liu			29	29†	20	31	23	18	22	21	22	24	Ret	16	22	20	23	0
32	(Japan) Hiyu Yamakoshi												29†	17	Ret				0
33	(Australia) Nicolas Stati			30	28	21	29	20	24	19	18	18	21	21	28	23	24	25	0
34	(United States) Everett Stack			31	26	Ret	25	Ret	Ret	26	Ret	Ret	27	29†	18	27	30	24	0
35	(Australia) Peter Bouzinelos			25	21	19	20	Ret	20										0
36	(Colombia) Maximiliano Restrepo			24	24	Ret	27	22	Ret	25	23	19	Ret	Ret	27	Ret	29	21	0
37	(China) Yuhao Fu			33	27	26	26	19	Ret	28	Ret	21	26	24	24	29	31	27	0
38	(Brazil) Aurelia Nobels			32	25	25	19	Ret	26										0
39	(Germany) Carrie Schreiner			28	23	23	21	21	25							28	28	Ret	0
40	(Switzerland) Tina Hausmann						Ret	27	21										0
Trophy Round-only drivers
–	(United Arab Emirates) Federico Al Rifai	2	2																–
–	(United Kingdom) Noah Lisle	6	4																–
–	(United Arab Emirates) Hamda Al Qubaisi	5	8																–
–	(United Kingdom) Josh Irfan	8	9																–
–	(Kyrgyzstan) Georgy Zhuravskiy	10	10																–
–	(United Arab Emirates) Amna Al Qubaisi	11	11																–
–	(United Kingdom) Jessica Edgar	13	Ret																–
–	(France) Laura Villars	Ret	13																–
Pos	Driver	YMC TR		R1	R2	R3	R1	R2	R3	R1	R2	R3	R1	R2	R3	R1	R2	R3	Pts
Pos	Driver	YMC TR		YMC1			YMC2			DUB1			YMC3			DUB2			Pts

Colour	Result
Gold	Winner
Silver	Second place
Bronze	Third place
Green	Points classification
Blue	Non-points classification
Blue	Non-classified finish (NC)
Purple	Retired, not classified (Ret)
Red	Did not qualify (DNQ)
Red	Did not pre-qualify (DNPQ)
Black	Disqualified (DSQ)
White	Did not start (DNS)
White	Withdrew (WD)
White	Race cancelled (C)
Blank	Did not practice (DNP)
Blank	Did not arrive (DNA)
Blank	Excluded (EX)

**Bold** – Pole
Italics – Fastest Lap
† — Did not finish, but classified

=== Rookies' Championship ===
Pos	Driver	YMC TR		YMC1			YMC2			DUB1			YMC3			DUB2			Pts
Pos	Driver	YMC TR		R1	R2	R3	R1	R2	R3	R1	R2	R3	R1	R2	R3	R1	R2	R3	Pts
1	(United Kingdom) Kean Nakamura-Berta			1	2	1	4	1	1	1	2	1	3	Ret	Ret	1	4	1	275
2	(United States) Alex Powell	1	1	2	3	7	1	2	12	3	1	4	2	3	9	2	5	DNS	197
3	(France) Jules Caranta			7	1	14	Ret	6	3	7	5	3	4	4	4	4	3	3	163
4	(France) Doriane Pin			3	9	2	2	10	2	2	6	7	1	5	2				157
5	(United Arab Emirates) Zack Scoular	2	2	4	4	3	3	3	4	15	Ret	2	15†	Ret	8	7	6	4	129
6	(Italy) Enzo Yeh			6	Ret	4	Ret	Ret	5	12	4	Ret	6	2	5	3	14	2	111
7	(United Kingdom) Reza Seewooruthun			9	5	8	9	5	9	8	11	Ret	5	1	1	12	11	8	98
8	(Sri Lanka) Yevan David			5	8	5	8	7	8	6	7	5	8	13†	7	9	7	6	88
9	(Finland) Luka Sammalisto			8	11	9	Ret	11	10	10	3	8	9	7	6	6	2	7	75
10	(Australia) Kamal Mrad			12	6	6	6	13†	Ret	4	9	6	7	9	13†	13	9	5	66
11	(Italy) Maksimilian Popov			11	7	12	5	4	7	13	10	11	14	10	11	8	8	11	44
12	(Latvia) Tomass Štolcermanis												12	8	Ret	5	1	Ret	39
13	(China) Yuanpu Cui						11	12†	6	11	12	12	10	6	3	10	10	9	36
14	(Australia) Nicolas Stati			13	13	11	12	9	13	9	8	9	11	11	12	11	12	10	11
15	(Luxembourg) Chester Kieffer									5	13	Ret							10
16	(Australia) Peter Bouzinelos			10	10	10	7	Ret	11										9
17	(China) Yuhao Fu			14	12	13	10	8	Ret	14	Ret	10	13	12	10	14	13	12	7
Trophy Round-only drivers
–	(France) Laura Villars	Ret	3																–
Pos	Driver	YMC TR		R1	R2	R3	R1	R2	R3	R1	R2	R3	R1	R2	R3	R1	R2	R3	Pts
Pos	Driver	YMC TR		YMC1			YMC2			DUB1			YMC3			DUB2			Pts

Colour	Result
Gold	Winner
Silver	Second place
Bronze	Third place
Green	Points classification
Blue	Non-points classification
Blue	Non-classified finish (NC)
Purple	Retired, not classified (Ret)
Red	Did not qualify (DNQ)
Red	Did not pre-qualify (DNPQ)
Black	Disqualified (DSQ)
White	Did not start (DNS)
White	Withdrew (WD)
White	Race cancelled (C)
Blank	Did not practice (DNP)
Blank	Did not arrive (DNA)
Blank	Excluded (EX)

**Bold** – Pole
Italics – Fastest Lap
† — Did not finish, but classified

=== Teams' Championship ===
Ahead of each event, the teams nominated two drivers that accumulated teams' points.

Pos	Team	Points
1	(India) Mumbai Falcons Racing Limited	340
2	(Italy) Prema Racing	238
3	(United Arab Emirates) Yas Heat Racing Academy	184
4	(United Kingdom) Hitech Pulse-Eight	148
5	(Germany) PHM AIX Racing	124
6	(France) R-ace GP	113
7	(Australia) AGI Sport	52
8	(France) Saintéloc Racing	48
9	(United Arab Emirates) Xcel Motorsport	10
10	(Republic of Ireland) Pinnacle Motorsport	2
11	(United Arab Emirates) X GP	0
