= 2023 Macau Formula 4 race =

Motorsport event

The 2023 Macau Formula 4 race, also called the 2023 Macau Asia Formula 4, was a Formula 4 (F4) motor race held on the Guia Circuit in Macau on 12 November 2023, as part of the 2023 Macau Grand Prix. It was the fourth F4 race in Macau, and it was an invitational, non-championship round of the 2023 Formula 4 South East Asia Championship. The event featured two races: a seven-lap qualifying race to determine the starting grid for the twelve-lap final race.

The race had 23 drivers and 11 teams. SJM Theodore Prema Racing's Arvid Lindblad, won the event from pole position after winning the qualification race earlier that day that he began from pole position after setting the fastest lap time in the half-hour qualifying session. Lindblad led every lap of the two races, which was hampered by inclement weather in the morning and included repeated deployments of the safety car due to driver accidents. His teammate Charles Leong came in second, followed by Rashid Al Dhaheri in third.

== Background and entry list ==
Layout of the Guia Circuit

In early 2023, the Macau Grand Prix Organizing Committee and Shanghai-based motor racing championship promoter Top Speed began negotiations to include the Formula 4 (F4) junior single-seater car category in the 2023 Macau Grand Prix. If a higher single-seater category was not included in the 2023 Grand Prix meeting, the winner of the season-ending F4 Chinese Championship race would be named the Macau Grand Prix winner. It was held as part of the revived 2023 Formula 4 South East Asia Championship instead of the 2023 F4 Chinese Championship, which had been the case in the previous three editions of the event, and was an invitational, non-championship round. The event was held on the 24-turn clockwise 6.120 km (3.803 mi) Guia Circuit in the streets of the Chinese special administrative region of Macau on 12 November following a day of practice and qualifying. It was the fourth consecutive year that Macau hosted an F4 race after the category was added to the event owing to COVID-19 regulations that prevented the Formula Three round from being held.

Drivers invited to the race had to be at least 15 years old (with their birth date binding) and hold an International C or ASN national licence. The race accepted entries between 21 August and 15 September, with a maximum of 28 allowed. The entry list for 23 drivers and 11 teams was released on 25 October. Each driver competed in a Tatuus F4-T421 Gen 2 car equipped with the updated Fiat Abarth F413T turbocharged engine and the Halo cockpit protection device. Charles Leong, the two-time Macau Grand Prix winner, was among the drivers entered in the race. Martinius Stenshorne, the 2023 Formula Regional European Championship runner-up, returned to F4 racing with the Pinnacle Motorsport/B-MAX Racing team. There were three female drivers in the race: Bianca Bustamante, Miki Koyama and Vivian Siu. Budgetary constraints prevented Andy Chang, the 2022 Macau Grand Prix winner, from entering the event.

== Practice and qualifying ==
Drivers had a single 45-minute practice session to test their cars and become acquainted with the Guia Circuit on the morning of 11 November. SJM Theodore Prema Racing's Freddie Slater lapped fastest at 2:30.922, 17 minutes into the session. Stenshorne, Leong, Arvid Lindblad, Jack Beeton, Raphaël Narac, Rashid Al Dhaheri, Kevin Xiao, Ethan Ho and Enzo Yeh followed in positions two to ten. Thomas Leung crashed into the barrier, forcing practice to be halted after seven minutes so that his car could be recovered. Liu Kai Shun hit the wall at the Melco hairpin, breaking his front wing. Tiago Rodrigues hit him from behind, causing a three-car traffic jam that required a second stoppage before being cleared. Lindblad crashed at Lisboa Corner, prompting Hadrien David and Yeh to drive into the run-off area to avoid Lindblad's stalled car. Beeton had earlier struck the Fisherman's Bend corner wall; thus practice ended early with eight minutes left. The bottom of the barriers were severely damaged and required extensive repairs, while Beeton's car was tough to remove from the barrier before being loaded onto a flatbed truck.

Later that afternoon, a half-hour qualifying session determined the qualification race's starting order based on each driver's quickest lap time. Drivers who did not lap within 110 percent of the fastest entrant did not qualify for the event. The session's start was delayed by a quarter of an hour due to a slippery track in the last sector caused by a support race incident. Lindblad claimed pole position for the qualification race with a lap time of 2:24.293 on his final lap. He was joined on the front row by Slater, whose fastest lap was 0.549 seconds slower, while David was third. Both Leong and Al Dhaheri took fourth and fifth late in the session. Beeton took sixth, Narac seventh, Rodrigues eighth, and Stenshorne ninth. Ho completed the top ten qualifiers. Bustamante in 11th set her quickest lap at the end of qualifying and was the fastest driver not to qualify in the top ten places. Following her in the final places were Yeh, Liu Kai Shun, Koyama, Kai Daryanani, Xiao, Cheong, Chui Ka Kam, Ryuji "Dragon" Kumita, Marco Lau, Siu, Jaden Pariat and Leung. The final five qualifiers were outside the 110% limit but were allowed to compete in the qualifying race. Daryanani oversteered into the Lisboa corner wall, halting qualifying for five minutes after 12 minutes. Stenshorne broke his front-right wheel in an accident on the track's final sector, stopping qualifying for six minutes. With nine minutes remaining, Narac's front wing broke against the Solitude Esses turn barrier, and his car briefly rose while embedding itself into the wall. Qualifying was stopped for 13 minutes because recovery vehicles needed to return to their locations for future usage, extending the car's recovery time.

=== Qualifying classification ===
Pos.	No.	Driver	Team	Time	Gap
1	23	(United Kingdom) Arvid Lindblad	(Hong Kong) SJM Theodore Prema Racing	2:24.293	—
2	27	(United Kingdom) Freddie Slater	(Hong Kong) SJM Theodore Prema Racing	2:24.842	+0.549
3	2	(France) Hadrien David	(France) R-ace GP	2:24.883	+0.590
4	11	(Macau) Charles Leong	(Hong Kong) SJM Theodore Prema Racing	2:25.239	+0.946
5	14	(United Arab Emirates) Rashid Al Dhaheri	(Italy) Prema Racing	2:25.983	+1.690
6	45	(Australia) Jack Beeton	(Australia) AGI Sport	2:26.573	+2.280
7	1	(France) Raphaël Narac	(France) R-ace GP	2:27.219	+2.926
8	7	(Macau) Tiago Rodrigues	(China) Asia Racing Team	2:27.530	+3.237
9	34	(Norway) Martinius Stenshorne	(Republic of Ireland) Pinnacle Motorsport	2:27.738	+3.445
10	68	(Chinese Taipei) Ethan Ho	(Chinese Taipei) Team KRC	2:28.563	+4.270
11	19	(Philippines) Bianca Bustamante	(Hong Kong) BlackArts Racing	2:28.733	+4.440
12	77	(Italy) Enzo Yeh	(China) Asia Racing Team	2:29.319	+5.026
13	72	(Hong Kong) Liu Kai Shun	(Republic of Ireland) Pinnacle Motorsport	2:29.765	+5.472
14	8	(Japan) Miki Koyama	(Japan) Super License	2:30.150	+5.857
15	88	(India) Kai Daryanani	(Republic of Ireland) Pinnacle Motorsport	2:30.184	+5.891
16	96	(China) Kevin Xiao	(China) Asia Racing Team	2:30.602	+6.309
17	4	(Macau) Marcus Cheong	(China) Asia Racing Team	2:33.814	+9.521
18	16	(Hong Kong) Chui Ka Kam	(China) CHAMP Motorsport	2:38.325	+14.032
110% time: 2:38.722
19	30	(Japan) "Dragon"	(Japan) B-Max Racing Team	2:39.683	+15.390
20	53	(Hong Kong) Marco Lau	(Hong Kong) H-Star Racing	2:44.202	+19.909
21	28	(Hong Kong) Vivian Siu	(China) CHAMP Motorsport	2:47.384	+23.091
22	5	(India) Jaden Pariat	(Hong Kong) BlackArts Racing	No Time	—
23	22	(Hong Kong) Thomas Leung	(Hong Kong) H-Star Racing	No Time	—

== Qualifying race ==
The qualifying race to set the main race's starting order began at 08:00 local time on 12 November and was scheduled to last eight laps. Rain and winds hit Macau that morning, causing standing water and a lack of grip on the wet circuit. Race organisers permitted drivers to conduct additional sighter laps to assess the conditions. Because of the weather and the large amount of spray, it was decided not to begin the race with a standing start but to hold the first two laps under safety car conditions, which made judging braking and turning into corners difficult when the lap began and ended because water could accumulate from being drained from other parts of the track. Liu spun into the pit lane straight barriers at the start of the second lap, causing damage to his front wing. Liu stopped against the wall at Reservoir Bend, extending the safety car period by one lap as it was tended to. The safety car led the field through the pit lane at the conclusion of the second lap and was withdrawn at the end of the following lap, during which time some water was removed from the course and spray levels fell.

At the start of lap four, Lindblad led Slater and David (who avoided an accident by regaining control of his car's loose rear at Fisherman's Bend turn and nearly losing third place to Leong) and drove away from the rest of the field. Daryanani retired after hitting the R Bend turn barrier before crossing the start/finish line, triggering the safety car's second deployment. To enable the recovery of Daryanani's stranded car, each driver had to go through the pit lane again. After Daryanani's car was removed from the track, the race restarted on lap six with Lindblad again leading from Slater and David. Lindblad pulled away from teammate Slater, while the other drivers chose alternative paths through the first sector to avoid spray. On the same lap, under pressure from Leong, David made a driver error and crashed into the barrier at the exit of Dona Maria corner. Leong was promoted to third, and the safety car was deployed for the third and final time on lap seven. During the safety car period, Stenshorne stopped on track at San Francisco Hill because of a mechanical issue and could not restart until the whole field had passed him.

The race concluded under safety car conditions due to the time limit expiring, and Lindblad led every lap of the qualification race to secure victory, ensuring he would start the main race on pole position. Slater came in second position, 0.758 seconds behind, and Leong finished third. Al Dhaheri, Beeto and Ho finished in positions four through six. On the final lap, Narac's front wing was damaged, and he was shown the mechanical flag (black and orange). As a result, he was unable to enter the pit lane for repairs and finished in seventh. The final classified finishers were Rodrigues, Bustamante and Yeh, Koyama, Xiao, Chui, Cheong, Leung, Dragon, Siu and Lau; Siu and Lau received drive-through penalties, which were converted into 30-second time penalties and added to their final race times, dropping them to 17th and 18th place, respectively.

=== Qualifying race classification ===
Pos	No.	Driver	Team	Laps	Time/Retired	Grid
1	23	(United Kingdom) Arvid Lindblad	(Hong Kong) SJM Theodore Prema Racing	7	25:39.046	1
2	27	(United Kingdom) Freddie Slater	(Hong Kong) SJM Theodore Prema Racing	7	+0.758	2
3	11	(Macau) Charles Leong	(Hong Kong) SJM Theodore Prema Racing	7	+1.628	4
4	14	(United Arab Emirates) Rashid Al Dhaheri	(Italy) Prema Racing	7	+2.663	5
5	45	(Australia) Jack Beeton	(Australia) AGI Sport	7	+3.405	6
6	68	(Chinese Taipei) Ethan Ho	(Chinese Taipei) Team KRC	7	+5.913	10
7	1	(France) Raphaël Narac	(France) R-ace GP	7	+53.246	7
8	7	(Macau) Tiago Rodrigues	(China) Asia Racing Team	7	+53.699	8
9	19	(Philippines) Bianca Bustamante	(Hong Kong) BlackArts Racing	7	+54.869	11
10	77	(Italy) Enzo Yeh	(China) Asia Racing Team	7	+55.712	12
11	8	(Japan) Miki Koyama	(Japan) Super License	7	+56.977	14
12	96	(China) Kevin Xiao	(China) Asia Racing Team	7	+57.537	16
13	16	(Hong Kong) Chui Ka Kam	(China) CHAMP Motorsport	7	+59.950	18
14	4	(Macau) Marcus Cheong	(China) Asia Racing Team	7	+1:01.616	17
15	22	(Hong Kong) Thomas Leung	(Hong Kong) H-Star Racing	7	+1:05.809	22
16	30	(Japan) "Dragon"	(Japan) B-Max Racing Team	7	+1:09.367	19
17	28	(Hong Kong) Vivian Siu	(China) CHAMP Motorsport	7	+1:35.309	21
18	53	(Hong Kong) Marco Lau	(Hong Kong) H-Star Racing	7	+1:58.554	20
NC	34	(Norway) Martinius Stenshorne	(Republic of Ireland) Pinnacle Motorsport	7	+1:42.043	9
Ret	2	(France) Hadrien David	(France) R-ace GP	5	Accident	3
Ret	88	(India) Kai Daryanani	(Republic of Ireland) Pinnacle Motorsport	2	Accident	15
Ret	72	(Hong Kong) Liu Kaishun	(Republic of Ireland) Pinnacle Motorsport	1	Accident	13
Fastest lap: Arvid Lindblad, 2:40.400, 85.3 mph (137.3 km/h), on lap 6

== Final race ==
The 12-lap final race began 29 minutes after its planned start time of 15:40 local time on 12 November. The grid was dry prior to the race due to improved weather conditions, albeit some dust patches were set on the circuit to dry spilt oil. Lindblad held off a challenge from teammate Slater to sneak around on the outside into the braking zone for Lisboa corner, causing his teammate to turn in later than usual despite locking his tyres and weaving left and right to try to get the latter out of his slipstream. Behind them, Koyama lost control of her car into Lisboa corner. She spun against the outside tyre barrier, causing her vehicle's rear to bounce back onto the track and obstruct the outside line. Bustamante was sighted and hit Koyama's rear before Xiao lightly struck her. Cheong and David were forced to halt because their pathways were obstructed, and the safety car was called in to help officials clear the collision scene.

At the lap three restart, Slater pushed Lindblad for the race lead until a suspected electronic control unit problem in his car in the centre of the Solitude Esses caused him to fall to the back of the field. This promoted Leong to second, Al Dhaheri to third and Beeton to fourth. Stenshorne had advanced from 19th to seventh place after passing Rodrigues on the fourth lap when the safety car was deployed for the second time when Lau crashed at Paiol corner and spilled oil on the track. Due to the oil on the circuit, the safety car was deployed for three laps before the race resumed on lap eight. Lindblad again maintained his lead and was briefly challenged by Leong in second before being pressured by Al Dhaheri in third due to a lack of pace, allowing Lindblad to move away to 2.7 seconds by the end of lap nine. David had overtaken Daryanani and Chui to move into tenth.

Leung collided with Liu on the way to Lisboa Corner, driving the latter into the outside wall. Instead of deploying a safety car for the accident, yellow flags were waved at Lisboa corner, stopping drivers from overtaking. Stenshorne collided into the Fisherman's Bend turn barrier, removing his front wing on the straight and promoting everyone behind him up a position. On lap ten, Xiao collided with the wall at Dona Maria corner, resulting in the safety car's third and final deployment. Lindblad won the race under safety car conditions, having led every lap of the weekend. Leong finished 0.274 seconds behind in second and Al Dhaheri was third. Beeton finished fourth, ahead of Ho, Rodrigues, David, Yeh, Slater and Daryanani. The final finishers were Chui, Cheong, Dragon and Siu; Narac retired from eighth on lap ten due to car damage.

=== Final race classification ===
Pos	No.	Driver	Team	Laps	Time/Retired	Grid
1	23	(United Kingdom) Arvid Lindblad	(Hong Kong) SJM Theodore Prema Racing	12	37:28.517	1
2	11	(Macau) Charles Leong	(Hong Kong) SJM Theodore Prema Racing	12	+0.274	3
3	14	(United Arab Emirates) Rashid Al Dhaheri	(Italy) Prema Racing	12	+0.992	4
4	45	(Australia) Jack Beeton	(Australia) AGI Sport	12	+1.177	5
5	68	(Chinese Taipei) Ethan Ho	(Chinese Taipei) Team KRC	12	+2.666	6
6	7	(Macau) Tiago Rodrigues	(China) Asia Racing Team	12	+3.560	8
7	2	(France) Hadrien David	(France) R-ace GP	12	+3.807	20
8	77	(Italy) Enzo Yeh	(China) Asia Racing Team	12	+4.236	10
9	27	(United Kingdom) Freddie Slater	(Hong Kong) SJM Theodore Prema Racing	12	+4.527	2
10	88	(India) Kai Daryanani	(Republic of Ireland) Pinnacle Motorsport	12	+5.812	21
11	16	(Hong Kong) Chui Ka Kam	(China) CHAMP Motorsport	12	+6.571	13
12	4	(Macau) Marcus Cheong	(China) Asia Racing Team	12	+7.334	14
13	30	(Japan) "Dragon"	(Japan) B-Max Racing Team	12	+29.607	16
14	28	(Hong Kong) Vivian Siu	(China) CHAMP Motorsport	12	+2:02.952	17
Ret	1	(France) Raphaël Narac	(France) R-ace GP	10	Accident	7
Ret	96	(China) Kevin Xiao	(China) Asia Racing Team	9	Accident	12
Ret	34	(Norway) Martinius Stenshorne	(Republic of Ireland) Pinnacle Motorsport	8	Accident	19
Ret	72	(Hong Kong) Liu Kaishun	(Republic of Ireland) Pinnacle Motorsport	7	Accident	22
Ret	22	(Hong Kong) Thomas Leung	(Hong Kong) H-Star Racing	7	Accident	15
Ret	53	(Hong Kong) Marco Lau	(Hong Kong) H-Star Racing	3	Accident	18
Ret	19	(Philippines) Bianca Bustamante	(Hong Kong) BlackArts Racing	0	Accident	9
Ret	8	(Japan) Miki Koyama	(Japan) Super License	0	Accident	11
Fastest lap: Arvid Lindblad, 2:24.791, 94.5 mph (152.1 km/h), on lap 10
