= 2024 Formula Trophy UAE =

Motor racing competition

The 2024 Formula Trophy UAE was the inaugural season of the Formula Trophy UAE, a motor racing series for the United Arab Emirates regulated according to FIA Formula 4 regulations, and organised and promoted by the Emirates Motorsport Organization (EMSO) and Top Speed.

The season commenced on 30 November at the Dubai Autodrome and concluded on 14 December at the Yas Marina Circuit.

== Teams and drivers ==
Team	No.	Drivers	Class	Rounds
(United Arab Emirates) Xcel Motorsport	5	(United Kingdom) Ella Lloyd		1–2
(United Arab Emirates) Xcel Motorsport	19	(Singapore) Kabir Anurag		All
(United Arab Emirates) Xcel Motorsport	33	(South Africa) Cole Hewetson	R	All
(United Arab Emirates) Xcel Motorsport	48	(India) Ary Bansal	R	All
(Australia) Evans GP	7	(Canada) Alexander Berg		3
(Australia) Evans GP	8	(India) Kai Daryanani		All
(Australia) Evans GP	11	(Netherlands) Reno Francot		2
(Australia) Evans GP	24	(Australia) Seth Gilmore		All
(United Arab Emirates) Yas Heat Racing	12	(United Arab Emirates) Adam Al Azhari		All
(United Arab Emirates) Yas Heat Racing	47	(Sweden) August Raber		All
(China) Champ Motorsport	13	(Hong Kong) Andy Law		3
(China) Champ Motorsport	17	(China) Meng Cheng	R	1–2
(China) Champ Motorsport	30	(United States) Jia Zhanbin (Note: Jia is a Chinese driver competing under an American license.)		All
(India) Mumbai Falcons Racing Limited	14	(United Arab Emirates) Rashid Al Dhaheri		1–2
(India) Mumbai Falcons Racing Limited	28	(China) Newman Chi	R	All
(India) Mumbai Falcons Racing Limited	88	(Colombia) Salim Hanna	R	All
(India) Mumbai Falcons Racing Limited	98	(United States) Sebastian Wheldon		3
(Australia) AGI Sport	15	(Australia) Nicolas Stati		All
(Australia) AGI Sport	20	(Singapore) Nooris Gafoor		All
(Australia) AGI Sport	42	(United Kingdom) Emily Cotty	R	2–3
(Australia) AGI Sport	93	(Australia) James Piszcyk		1–2
(Republic of Ireland) Pinnacle Motorsport	16	(Italy) Davide Larini		1
(Republic of Ireland) Pinnacle Motorsport	25	(China) Wang Yuzhe		All
(Republic of Ireland) Pinnacle Motorsport	36	(Sweden) Gustav Jonsson		All
(United Arab Emirates) X GP	69	(China) Yuhao Fu		All
(United Arab Emirates) X GP	90	(United Kingdom) Chase Fernandez	R	All

Icon	Legend
R	Rookie

== Race calendar ==
The schedule consists of 7 races over 3 rounds.

Round		Circuit	Date	Pole position	Fastest lap	Winning driver	Winning team	Rookie winner	Supporting
1	R1	Dubai Autodrome, Dubai	30 November	(United Arab Emirates) Rashid Al Dhaheri	(United Arab Emirates) Rashid Al Dhaheri	(United Arab Emirates) Rashid Al Dhaheri	(India) Mumbai Falcons Racing Limited	(China) Newman Chi	Clio Cup Middle East
1	R2	Dubai Autodrome, Dubai	1 December		(United Arab Emirates) Rashid Al Dhaheri	(Singapore) Kabir Anurag	(United Arab Emirates) Xcel Motorsport	(Colombia) Salim Hanna	Clio Cup Middle East
1	R3	Dubai Autodrome, Dubai	1 December	(United Arab Emirates) Rashid Al Dhaheri	(United Arab Emirates) Rashid Al Dhaheri	(Sweden) Gustav Jonsson (Note: Al Dhaheri finished first but was demoted one position for leaving the track and gaining an advantage. Jonsson, therefore inherited the win.)	(Republic of Ireland) Pinnacle Motorsport	(United Kingdom) Chase Fernandez	Clio Cup Middle East
2	R1	Yas Marina Circuit, Abu Dhabi	7 December	(United Arab Emirates) Rashid Al Dhaheri	(United Arab Emirates) Rashid Al Dhaheri	(India) Kai Daryanani (Note: Al Dhaheri finished first but received a 5 second time penalty for forcing another car off the track and another 5 second time penalty for crowding. Francot finished second but also received a 5 second time penalty for crowding. Daryanani, therefore inherited the win.)	(Australia) Evans GP	(China) Newman Chi	Formula One World Championship; Formula 2 Championship; F1 Academy
2	R2	Yas Marina Circuit, Abu Dhabi	8 December	(United Arab Emirates) Rashid Al Dhaheri	(Netherlands) Reno Francot	(United Arab Emirates) Rashid Al Dhaheri	(India) Mumbai Falcons Racing Limited	(United Kingdom) Chase Fernandez	Formula One World Championship; Formula 2 Championship; F1 Academy
3	R1	Yas Marina Circuit, Abu Dhabi	14 December	(United States) Sebastian Wheldon	(United States) Sebastian Wheldon	(United States) Sebastian Wheldon	(India) Mumbai Falcons Racing Limited	(China) Newman Chi	Gulf 12 Hours
3	R2	Yas Marina Circuit, Abu Dhabi	14 December	(China) Newman Chi	(Singapore) Kabir Anurag	(Singapore) Kabir Anurag	(United Arab Emirates) Xcel Motorsport	(Colombia) Salim Hanna	Gulf 12 Hours

== Championship standings ==
Points are awarded to the top 10 classified finishers in each race.

Position	**1st**	**2nd**	**3rd**	**4th**	**5th**	**6th**	**7th**	**8th**	**9th**	**10th**
Points	25	18	15	12	10	8	6	4	2	1

=== Drivers' Championship ===
Pos	Driver	DUB			YMC1		YMC2		Pts
Pos	Driver	R1	R2	R3	R1	R2	R1	R2	Pts
1	(India) Kai Daryanani	4	4	9	1	2	3	2	102
2	(United Arab Emirates) Rashid Al Dhaheri	**1**	2	**2**	**5**	**1**			96
3	(Singapore) Kabir Anurag	6	1	11	8	4	7	1	80
4	(Sweden) Gustav Jonsson	2	7	1	3	9	19†	Ret	66
5	(China) Newman Chi	3	11	14	4	10	2	**6**	54
6	(Australia) James Piszcyk	5	3	3	6	20			48
7	(Colombia) Salim Hanna	7	5	13	9	11	4	5	40
8	(Australia) Nicolas Stati	8	6	7	7	6	10	7	39
9	(United States) Sebastian Wheldon						**1**	4	37
10	(Netherlands) Reno Francot				2	3			33
11	(Sweden) August Raber	9	8	10	10	7	8	3	33
12	(United Arab Emirates) Adam Al Azhari	12	Ret	16	11	5	5	8	24
13	(United Kingdom) Chase Fernandez	10	15	4	13	8	11	9	19
14	(India) Ary Bansal	14	10	5	12	12	9	10	14
15	(South Africa) Cole Hewetson	18	16	8	15	16	6	14	12
16	(Italy) Davide Larini	20†	9	6					10
17	(Singapore) Nooris Gafoor	11	17	12	16	13	13	12	0
18	(Canada) Alexander Berg						12	11	0
19	(Australia) Seth Gilmore	13	12	15	20	14	WD	WD	0
20	(China) Yuhao Fu	Ret	WD	WD	14	15	16	13	0
21	(United States) Jia Zhanbin	15	13	17	19	21	17	17	0
22	(China) Wang Yuzhe	16	14	18	18	18	14	15	0
23	(United Kingdom) Emily Cotty				21	Ret	15	16	0
24	(United Kingdom) Ella Lloyd	19†	Ret	19	17	17			0
25	(China) Meng Cheng	17	Ret	Ret	Ret	19			0
26	(Hong Kong) Andy Law						18	18	0
Pos	Driver	R1	R2	R3	R1	R2	R1	R2	Pts
Pos	Driver	DUB			YMC1		YMC2		Pts

Colour	Result
Gold	Winner
Silver	Second place
Bronze	Third place
Green	Points classification
Blue	Non-points classification
Blue	Non-classified finish (NC)
Purple	Retired, not classified (Ret)
Red	Did not qualify (DNQ)
Red	Did not pre-qualify (DNPQ)
Black	Disqualified (DSQ)
White	Did not start (DNS)
White	Withdrew (WD)
White	Race cancelled (C)
Blank	Did not practice (DNP)
Blank	Did not arrive (DNA)
Blank	Excluded (EX)

**Bold** – Pole
Italics – Fastest Lap
† — Did not finish, but classified

== See also ==
- 2025 F4 Middle East Championship
