= Kai Daryanani =

Indian racing driver (born 2005)

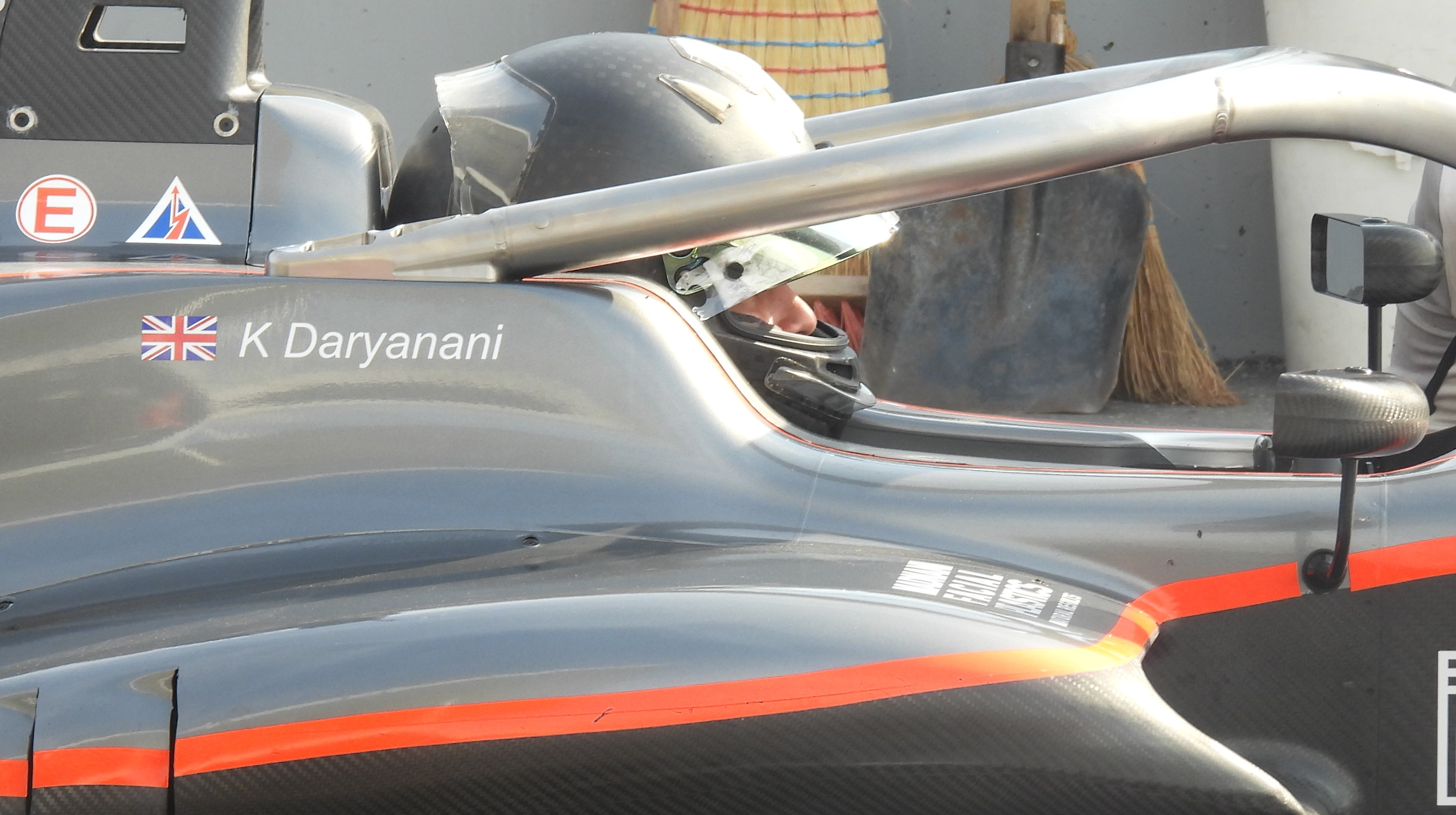
- Daryanani in 2025
- Nationality: (India) Indian
- Born: 14 April 2005 (age 21) Hong Kong

Formula Regional European Championship career
- Debut season: 2026
- Current team: Trident
- Car number: 87
- Starts: 19
- Wins: 0
- Podiums: 0
- Poles: 0
- Fastest laps: 0
- Best finish: 25th in 2026

Previous series
- 2025–2026 2025 2025 2025–2026 2024 2024 2024 2023–2024 2023–2024 2023–2024 2023 2023 2023: Eurocup-3; GB3; Eurocup-3 Winter; FR Middle East; Formula Trophy UAE; Australian F4; Italian F4; Euro 4 F4 British; F4 UAE; GB4; F4 Spanish; F4 South East Asia

Championship titles
- 2024: Formula Trophy UAE
- Statistics up to date as of 12 November 2026.

Kai Daryanani (born 13 April 2005) is an Indian racing driver who last competed in the Formula Regional European Championship for Trident.

Daryanani previously raced in the GB3 Championship for JHR Developments and Eurocup-3 for KCL by MP under a British licence.

Daryanani is the 2024 Formula Trophy UAE Champion.

== Career ==
=== Formula 4 ===
==== 2023 ====
Daryanani made his Formula 4 debut in 2023, driving for Pinnacle VAR in the 2023 Formula 4 UAE Championship. His season yielded a best result of 17th at Yas Marina, seeing him finish in 36th in the championship standings. Daryanani's main season championship, however, was in the 2023 F4 British Championship, where he would drive for Virtuosi Racing. Another tough campaign followed, but Daryanani showed clear improvement from his 15 races in the UAE, as he secured a best result of sixth on his way to 24th in the standings. He ended his season in the Formula 4 South East Asia Championship, where he finished tenth in the standings with one podium. Daryanani also made appearances in various other F4 series, most notably in the 2023 GB4 Championship where he secured his first victory in single-seaters.

==== 2024 ====
It was announced that Daryanani would continue in F4 in 2024, driving for Pinnacle Motorsport in the 2024 Formula 4 UAE Championship. Daryanani fared much better than in his previous season, this time scoring points with a best result of ninth at Yas Marina. He finished 25th in the standings. He then confirmed his participation in the 2024 F4 British Championship, this time driving for Fortec Motorsport. Daryanani had another much improved season in the series, as he scored points regularly. He secured three fourth-placed finishes over the course of the year, and at season's end, he finished 12th in the standings, beating all his teammates. Daryanani ended his last year in Formula 4 with a full season of the 2024 Formula Trophy UAE. In the first round, he secured three points finishes. He then secured his second ever victory in Formula 4 with a victory and a podium in the second round at Yas Marina, placing him second in the championship. In the final round, he secured the title with a pair of podiums, handing Daryanani his first ever championship title.

=== Formula Regional ===
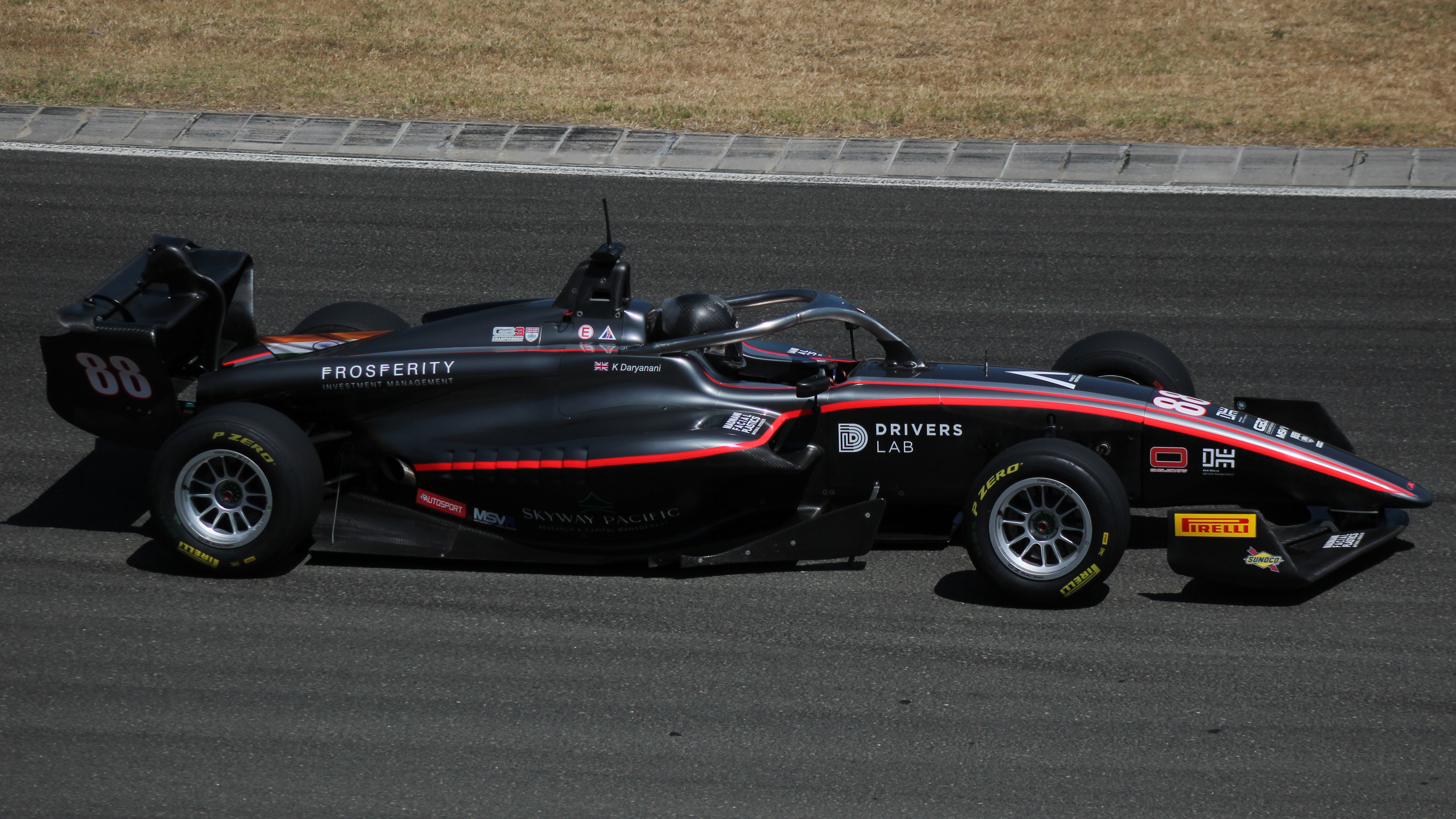
Daryanani driving at the Hungaroring during the 2025 GB3 Championship

==== 2024 ====
Daryanani made his Formula Regional debut at the 2024 Macau Grand Prix with Evans GP. He qualified in 26th, and made improvements in the qualifying race, making six places to finish 20th, which would be his grid position for the main race. However, Daryanani crashed out of the main race and was unable to finish the race.

==== 2025 ====
Daryanani competed the full season in the 2025 Formula Regional Middle East Championship, continuing his successful partnership with Evans GP.

==== 2026 ====
Daryanani moved to the Formula Regional European Championship with Trident in 2026. He also raced in the pre-season Formula Regional Middle East Trophy with them. At the end of November, Daryanani raced in the Macau Grand Prix with G4 Racing.

== Racing record ==
=== Racing career summary ===
Season	Series	Team	Races	Wins	Poles	F/Laps	Podiums	Points	Position
2023	Formula 4 UAE Championship	Pinnacle VAR	15	0	0	0	0	0	36th
2023	F4 British Championship	Virtuosi Racing	29	0	0	0	0	8	24th
2023	GB4 Championship	Evans GP	6	1	0	0	1	61	18th
2023	Euro 4 Championship	Cram Motorsport	3	0	0	0	0	0	27th
2023	F4 Spanish Championship	Cram Motorsport	9	0	0	0	0	0	35th
2023	Macau Formula 4 Race	Pinnacle Motorsport	2	0	0	0	0	N/A	10th
2023	Formula 4 South East Asia Championship	Pinnacle Motorsport	6	0	0	0	1	36	10th
2024	Formula 4 UAE Championship	Pinnacle Motorsport	15	0	0	0	0	2	25th
2024	F4 British Championship	Fortec Motorsport	30	0	0	0	0	93	12th
2024	Italian F4 Championship	Cram Motorsport	12	0	0	0	0	0	31st
2024	Euro 4 Championship	Cram Motorsport	3	0	0	0	0	0	33rd
2024	Formula 4 Australian Championship	Evans GP	3	1	1	1	2	50	8th
2024	Macau Grand Prix	Evans GP	2	0	0	0	0	N/A	DNF
2024	Formula Trophy UAE	Evans GP	7	1	0	0	4	102	**1st**
2025	Formula Regional Middle East Championship	Evans GP	15	0	0	0	0	2	22nd
2025	Eurocup-3 Spanish Winter Championship	KCL by MP Motorsport	2	0	0	0	0	0	NC†
2025	GB3 Championship	JHR Developments	24	0	0	0	2	219	11th
2025	Eurocup-3	KCL by MP	13	0	0	0	0	13	17th
2026	Formula Regional Middle East Trophy	Trident	11	0	0	0	0	0	33rd
2026	Formula Regional European Championship	Trident	19	0	0	0	0	10	25th
2026	Eurocup-3	GRS Team	7	0	0	0	0	0	37th
2026	Macau Grand Prix	G4 Racing	0	0	0	0	0	—N/a	TBD

* Season still in progress.

=== Complete Formula 4 UAE Championship results ===
(key) (Races in bold indicate pole position; races in italics indicate fastest lap)

Year	Team	1	2	3	4	5	6	7	8	9	10	11	12	13	14	15	DC	Points
2023	Pinnacle VAR	DUB1; 1; 25	DUB1; 2; 21	DUB1; 3; 28	KMT1; 1; 25	KMT1; 2; 28	KMT1; 3; 24	KMT2; 1 Ret	KMT2; 2 Ret	KMT2; 3; 24	DUB2; 1; 20	DUB2; 2; 26	DUB2; 3; 29	YMC; 1; 17	YMC; 2 Ret	YMC; 3 Ret	36th	0
2024	Pinnacle Motorsport	YMC1; 1; 22	YMC1; 2; 16	YMC1; 3; 29†	YMC2; 1; 16	YMC2; 2; 9	YMC2; 3; 27	DUB1; 1; 27	DUB1; 2; 22	DUB1; 3; 14	YMC3; 1; 23	YMC3; 2; 25	YMC3; 3; 22	DUB2; 1 Ret	DUB2; 2; 23	DUB2; 3; 18	25th	2

=== Complete F4 British Championship results ===
(key) (Races in bold indicate pole position; races in italics indicate fastest lap)

Year	Team	1	2	3	4	5	6	7	8	9	10	11	12	13	14	15	16	17	18	19	20	21	22	23	24	25	26	27	28	29	30	31	32	DC	Points
2023	Virtuosi Racing	DPN; 1; 16	DPN; 2; 19	DPN; 3 Ret	BHI; 1; 14	BHI; 2; 17	BHI; 3; 16	SNE; 1 C	SNE; 2; 16	SNE; 3; 15	THR; 1; 14	THR; 2; 10^{2}	THR; 3; 19	OUL; 1; 13	OUL; 2; 11	OUL; 3; 14	SIL; 1; 17	SIL; 2; 18	SIL; 3; 18	CRO; 1; 16	CRO; 2; 6	CRO; 3; 16	KNO; 1; 11	KNO; 2; 8	KNO; 3; 19	DPGP; 1; 18	DPGP; 2; 16	DPGP; 3; 8	DPGP; 4 DNS	BHGP; 1 Ret	BHGP; 2; 16	BHGP; 3; 19		24th	8
2024	Fortec Motorsport	DPN; 1; 11	DPN; 2; 8^{2}	DPN; 3 C	BHI; 1; 10	BHI; 2 Ret	BHI; 3; 12	SNE; 1; 18	SNE; 2; 8^{10}	SNE; 3; 19	THR; 1; 9	THR; 2; 10^{4}	THR; 3; 12	SILGP; 1; 9	SILGP; 2; 11^{6}	SILGP; 3 Ret	ZAN; 1; 6	ZAN; 2; 13	ZAN; 3; 4	KNO; 1; 11	KNO; 2; 8	KNO; 3; 12	DPGP; 1; 4	DPGP; 2 Ret	DPGP; 3; 4^{2}	DPGP; 4; 8	SILN; 1; 13	SILN; 2 C	SILN; 3; 13	BHGP; 1; 8	BHGP; 2; 12^{5}	BHGP; 3; 13	BHGP; 4; 6	12th	93

=== Complete GB4 Championship results ===
(key) (Races in bold indicate pole position; races in italics indicate fastest lap)

Year	Team	1	2	3	4	5	6	7	8	9	10	11	12	13	14	15	16	17	18	19	20	21	DC	Points
2023	Evans GP	OUL; 1	OUL; 2	OUL; 3	SIL1; 1	SIL1; 2	SIL1; 3	DON1; 1; 11	DON1; 2; 10	DON1; 3; 8	SNE; 1	SNE; 2	SNE; 3	SIL2; 1	SIL2; 2	SIL2; 3	BRH; 1; 9	BRH; 2 Ret	BRH; 3; 1	DON2; 1	DON2; 2	DON2; 3	18th	61

=== Complete Euro 4 Championship results ===
(key) (Races in bold indicate pole position; races in italics indicate fastest lap)

Year	Team	1	2	3	4	5	6	7	8	9	DC	Points
2023	Cram Motorsport	MUG; 1	MUG; 2	MUG; 3	MNZ; 1; 20	MNZ; 2; 16	MNZ; 3; 14	CAT; 1	CAT; 2	CAT; 3	27th	0
2024	Cram Motorsport	MUG; 1	MUG; 2	MUG; 3	RBR; 1; 17	RBR; 2; 24	RBR; 3 Ret	MNZ; 1	MNZ; 2	MNZ; 3	33rd	0

=== Complete F4 Spanish Championship results ===
(key) (Races in bold indicate pole position; races in italics indicate fastest lap)

Year	Team	1	2	3	4	5	6	7	8	9	10	11	12	13	14	15	16	17	18	19	20	21	DC	Points
2023	Cram Motorsport	SPA; 1	SPA; 2	SPA; 3	ARA; 1	ARA; 2	ARA; 3	NAV; 1	NAV; 2	NAV; 3	JER; 1; 19	JER; 2; 23	JER; 3; 28	EST; 1; 29	EST; 2; 25	EST; 3; 23	CRT; 1; 29	CRT; 2; 23	CRT; 3; 22	CAT; 1	CAT; 2	CAT; 3	35th	0

=== Complete Formula 4 South East Asia Championship results ===
(key) (Races in bold indicate pole position; races in italics indicate fastest lap)

Year	Team	1	2	3	4	5	6	7	8	9	10	11	DC	Points
2023	Pinnacle Motorsport	ZZIC; 1	ZZIC; 2	ZZIC; 3	MAC; 1 Ret	MAC; 2; 10	SEP1; 1; 7	SEP1; 2; 14	SEP1; 3; 9	SEP2; 1; 5	SEP2; 2; 11	SEP2; 3; 2	10th	36

=== Complete Italian F4 Championship results ===
(key) (Races in bold indicate pole position; races in italics indicate fastest lap)

Year	Team	1	2	3	4	5	6	7	8	9	10	11	12	13	14	15	16	17	18	19	20	21	DC	Points
2024	Cram Motorsport	MIS; 1 Ret	MIS; 2; 18	MIS; 3 Ret	IMO; 1	IMO; 2	IMO; 3	VLL; 1	VLL; 2	VLL; 3	MUG; 1	MUG; 2	MUG; 3	LEC; 1; 31	LEC; 2; 20	LEC; 3; 12	CAT; 1 Ret	CAT; 2; 22	CAT; 3; 23	MNZ; 1; 25	MNZ; 2 Ret	MNZ; 3; 17	31st	0

=== Complete Formula 4 Australian Championship results ===
(key) (Races in bold indicate pole position; races in italics indicate fastest lap)

Year	Team	1	2	3	4	5	6	7	8	9	10	11	12	DC	Points
2024	Evans GP	BEN1; 1	BEN1; 2	BEN1; 3	BEN2; 1	BEN2; 2	BEN2; 3	SYD; 1	SYD; 2	SYD; 3	SEP; 1; 5	SEP; 2; 3	**SEP**; **3**; 1	8th	50

=== Complete Macau Grand Prix results ===
Year	Team	Car	Qualifying	Qualifying Race	Main Race
2024	(Australia) Evans GP	Tatuus F3 T-318	26th	20th	DNF
2026	(Switzerland) G4 Racing	Tatuus T-326	TBD	TBD	TBD

=== Complete Formula Trophy UAE results ===
(key) (Races in bold indicate pole position; races in italics indicate fastest lap)

Year	Team	1	2	3	4	5	6	7	DC	Points
2024	Evans GP	DUB; 1; 4	DUB; 2; 4	DUB; 3; 9	YMC1; 1; 1	YMC1; 2; 2	YMC2; 1; 3	YMC2; 2; 2	1st	102

=== Complete Formula Regional Middle East Championship/Trophy results ===
(key) (Races in bold indicate pole position) (Races in italics indicate fastest lap)

Year	Entrant	1	2	3	4	5	6	7	8	9	10	11	12	13	14	15	DC	Points
2025	Evans GP	YMC1; 1; 25†	YMC1; 2; 18	YMC1; 3; 18	YMC2; 1; 15	YMC2; 2; 13	YMC2; 3; 13	DUB; 1; 21	DUB; 2; 14	DUB; 3; 14	YMC3; 1 Ret	YMC3; 2; 17	YMC3; 3; 12	LUS; 1; 16	LUS; 2; 15	LUS; 3; 12	22nd	2
2026	Trident	YMC1; 1; 19	YMC1; 2; 17	YMC1; 3; 24†	YMC2; 1; 25	YMC2; 2; 25	YMC2; 3; 18	DUB; 1; 19	DUB; 2; 18	DUB; 3; 17	LUS; 1; 18	LUS; 2 C	LUS; 3; 16				33rd	0

=== Complete GB3 Championship results ===
(key) (Races in bold indicate pole position) (Races in italics indicate fastest lap)

Year	Team	1	2	3	4	5	6	7	8	9	10	11	12	13	14	15	16	17	18	19	20	21	22	23	24	DC	Points
2025	JHR Developments	SIL1; 1; 9	SIL1; 2; 15	SIL1; 3; 3	ZAN; 1; 9	ZAN; 2; 14	ZAN; 3 Ret	SPA; 1; 8	SPA; 2; 10	SPA; 3; 13	HUN; 1; 9	HUN; 2 Ret	HUN; 3; 2	SIL2; 1; 9	SIL2; 2; 7	SIL2; 3; 6	BRH; 1; 9	BRH; 2; 7	BRH; 3; 5^{1}	DON; 1; 15	DON; 2; 19	DON; 3; 11	MNZ; 1 Ret	MNZ; 2; 6	MNZ; 3; 14^{3}	11th	219

=== Complete Eurocup-3 results ===
(key) (Races in bold indicate pole position; races in italics indicate fastest lap)

Year	Team	1	2	3	4	5	6	7	8	9	10	11	12	13	14	15	16	17	18	19	DC	Points
2025	KCL by MP	RBR; 1	RBR; 2	POR; 1; 10	POR; SR; Ret	POR; 2; 17	LEC; 1; 13	LEC; SR; 9	LEC; 2 DNS	MNZ; 1	MNZ; 2	ASS; 1; 14	ASS; 2; 18	SPA; 1; 9	SPA; 2; 11	JER; 1; 8	JER; 2; 11	CAT; 1; 9	CAT; 2; 15		17th	13
2026	GRS Team	LEC; 1	LEC; SR	LEC; 2	POR; 1	POR; 2	IMO; 1	IMO; SR	IMO; 2	MNZ; 1	MNZ; 2	SIL; 1	SIL; 2	JER; 1; 17	JER; SR; 22	JER; 2; 18	HUN; 1; 28†	HUN; 2 Ret	CAT; 1; 18	CAT; 2; 20	37th	0

=== Complete Formula Regional European Championship results ===
(key) (Races in bold indicate pole position) (Races in italics indicate fastest lap)

Year	Team	1	2	3	4	5	6	7	8	9	10	11	12	13	14	15	16	17	18	19	20	DC	Points
2026	Trident	RBR; 1; 8	RBR; 2; 8	RBR; 3; 10	ZAN; 1; 19	ZAN; 2 Ret	SPA; 1; 10	SPA; 2 C	SPA; 3; 18	MNZ; 1; 10	MNZ; 2 Ret	MNZ; 3 Ret	HUN; 1; 29	HUN; 2; 25	LEC; 1; 24	LEC; 2 Ret	IMO; 1; 21	IMO; 2; 20	IMO; 3; 18	HOC; 1; 23	HOC; 2; 20	25th	10
