= Champions of the Future =

International kart racing championship

- Category: Kart racing
- Region: International
- Affiliations: CIK-FIA
- Inaugural season: 2020; 6 years ago
- Classes: OK, OK-J, KZ, KZ2, KZ2-M, OK-N, OKN-J, 60 Mini
- Drivers' champion: (United Kingdom) Kenzo Craigie; (OK, Kart Republic–IAME); (United Kingdom) Noah Baglin; (OK-J, Kart Republic–IAME); (France) Jérémy Iglesias; (KZ, CRG–TM); (Romania) Daniel Vasile; (KZ2, Birel ART–TM); (France) Anthony Abbasse; (KZ2-M, Sodi–TM); (Lithuania) Markas Šilkūnas; (OK-N, Kart Republic–IAME); (United Arab Emirates) Conor Clancy; (OKN-J, Kart Republic–IAME); (Italy) Niccoló Perico; (60 Mini, Parolin–TM)
- Official website: championskarting.com

Champions of the Future (COTF) is a kart racing competition organised by the RGMMC Group and sanctioned by FIA Karting (CIK-FIA). Founded in 2020, COTF is one of 11 competitions on the international kart racing calendar in CIK-FIA classes.

Initially a two-round series in OK and OK-Junior (OK-J)—with single-round finals in KZ2 and 60 Mini—the championship has since expanded to all eight CIK-FIA classes across the: Euro Series (OK, OK-J), Shifters (KZ, KZ2, KZ2-M), and Academy Program (OK-N, OKN-J, 60 Mini), the latter supported by F1 Academy. COTF also hosted the one-off Winter Series at Franciacorta in 2022. COTF is set to expand to national series in 2026, hosting a British title with Motorsport UK, an Emirati title, a Macanese title, and an American title.

The Euro Series and Shifters events traditionally take place in the two weeks prior to a World or European Championship round at the same circuit. Notable former champions includes two Formula One drivers: Arvid Lindblad (2020, OK-J) and Rafael Câmara (2021, OK). Luna Fluxá (2024, OK-N) is the only female driver to win a title.

== History ==
=== Background (1962–2019) ===
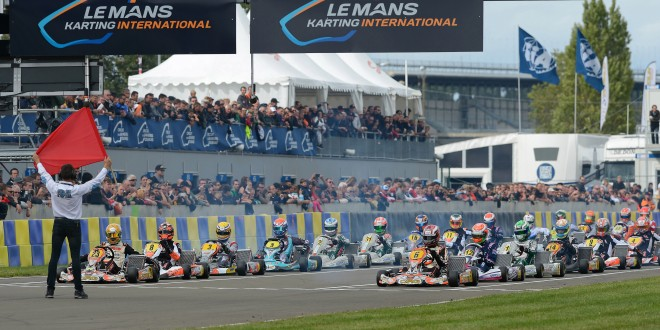
The RGMMC Group has been the official promoter of CIK-FIA events—the World and European Championships—since 2018.

The Commission Internationale de Karting (CIK-FIA) was founded in 1962 by the Fédération Internationale de l'Automobile (FIA) to govern the rising international sport of kart racing. The inaugural CIK-FIA World Championship was hosted two years later at the Pista d'Oro in Rome, which again held the event in 1965. The CIK-FIA began its homologation of distinct classes in the discipline in 1974, when the first 125 cc gearbox category was created for the European Championship: Formula C (FC). The 100 cc category was clarified in 1976, when Formula Europe was introduced to control technical evolutions and costs. The single-speed classes were adapted in 1981, when the 135 cc Formula K (FK), 100 cc Intercontinental A (ICA), and Junior Intercontinental A (ICA-J) were introduced to the World Championship, European Championship, and World Cup, respectively.

By 2020, there were five CIK-FIA classes: OK, the primary senior direct-drive class; OK-Junior (OK-J), the under-15 direct-drive class; KZ, the primary gearbox class; KZ2, the secondary gearbox class; and 60 Mini, the under-12 international class. Rotax was founded in 1920 as an internal combustion engine manufacturer and entered the FK class in 1983, later founding the Rotax Max Challenge in 2000. Italian American Motor Engineering (IAME) was founded as a kart manufacturer in 1968 as a merger between Parilla and Komet; it began operating its single-design championships, the IAME Series, in 2007. The Switzerland-based RGMMC Group had been established in 2004, later becoming the promoter of Rotax events in 2006, IAME events in 2016, and CIK-FIA events in 2018. Across 2018 and 2019 with the latter, RGMMC promoted six World Championships, two World Cups, and eight European Championships.

=== Championship beginnings (2020–2023) ===
==== 2020: Debut during COVID-19 pandemic ====
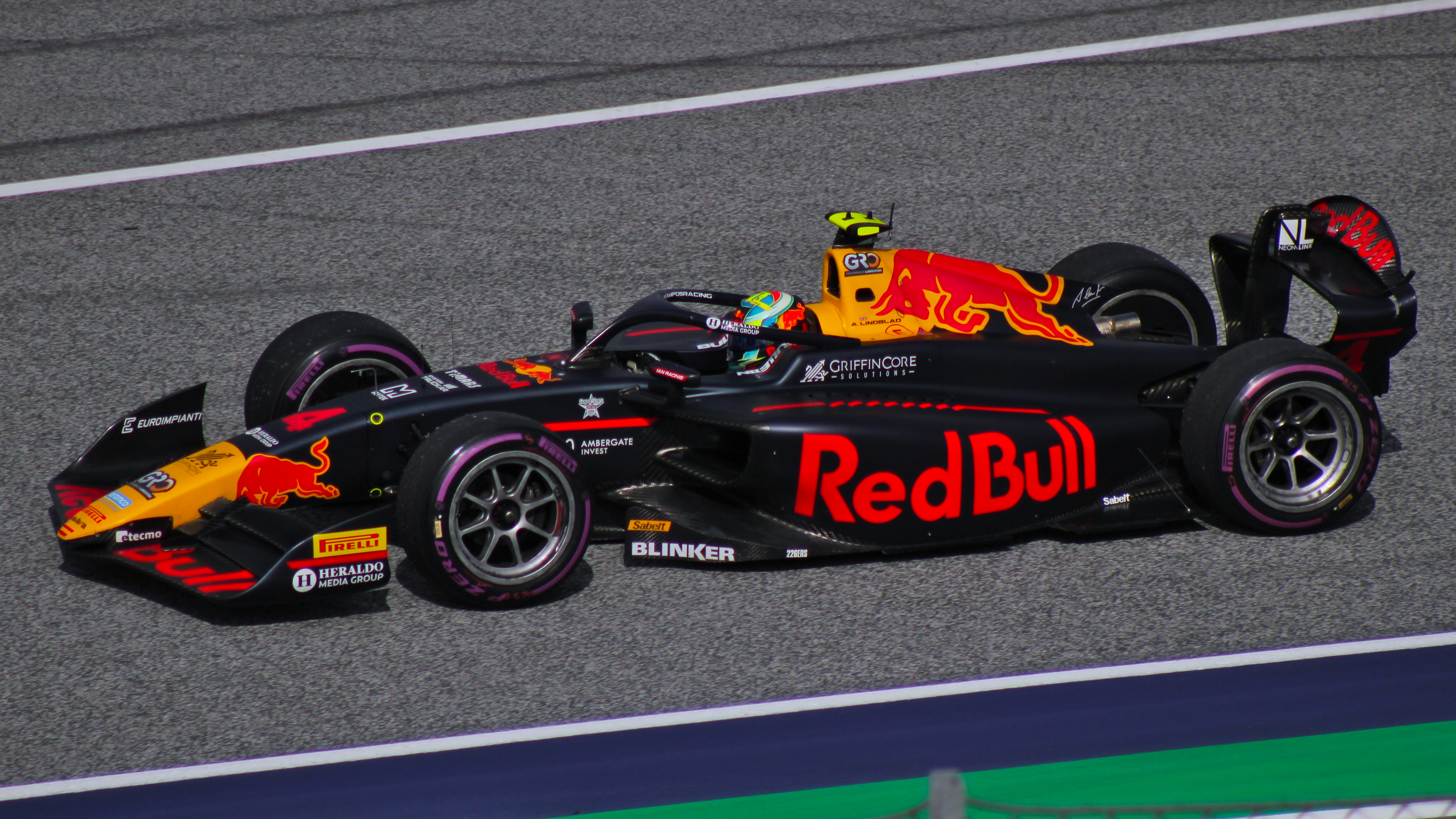
Arvid Lindblad (pictured in 2025) won the inaugural OK-J title in 2020.

COTF was founded in 2020 by the RGMMC Group to promote and develop four CIK-FIA classes—OK, OK-J, KZ2, and 60 Mini. Its inaugural round at Wackersdorf on 7–10 May was delayed and cancelled amidst the COVID-19 pandemic in Europe, as was the Kristianstad round on 25–28 June, leaving Zuera as the debut circuit of the series on 16–19 July. Over 170 drivers entered in preparation for the opening round of the European Championship that month. The second and final round was held on 1 November at Portimão in the OK and OK-J classes, serving as direct preparation for the World Championship one week later. The inaugural champions were Nikita Bedrin (OK), Arvid Lindblad (OK-J), Paolo Ippolito (KZ2), and Dmitry Matveev (60 Mini).

==== 2021–2023: Introduction of Euro Series and Academy Program ====
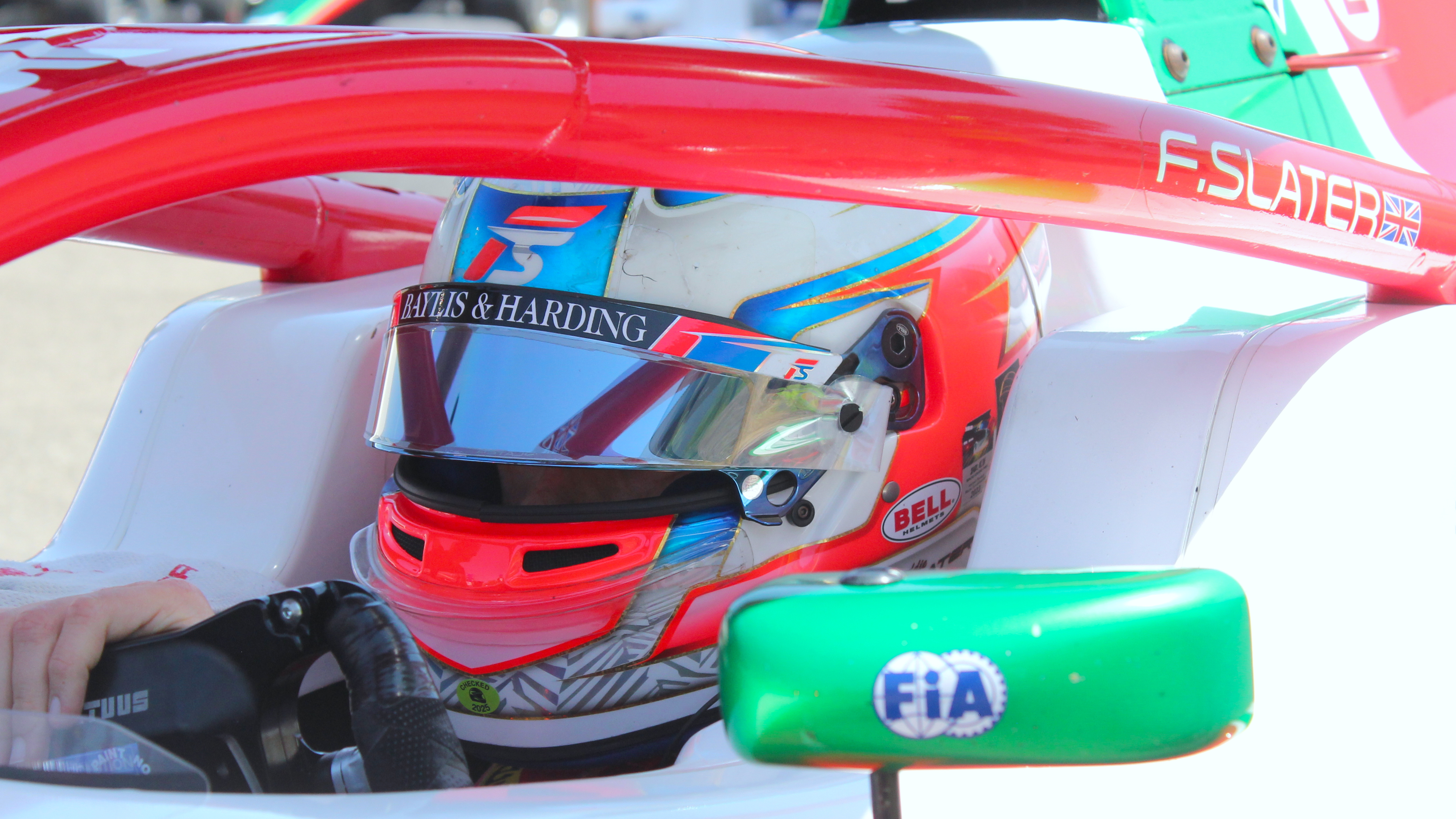
World Champion Freddie Slater (pictured in 2025) claimed the OK-J title in 2021.

The 2021 season was contested in OK and OK-J across three rounds at Genk, Zuera, and Campillos. The latter round replaced the Franciacorta and Castelletto rounds—which were cancelled due to logistical challenges—and provided support for the upcoming World Championship. Rafael Câmara and reigning World Champion Freddie Slater claimed the championships in OK and OK-J, respectively. Prior to the 2022 season, the one-off Champions of the Future Winter Series was held at Franciacorta in: OK, won by Tomass Štolcermanis; OK-J, won by Maciej Gładysz; and KZ2, won by Simo Puhakka. The regular season was re-branded as the Champions of the Future Euro Series—held over four rounds timetabled by factory-backed teams at Portimão, Zuera, Kristianstad, and Franciacorta—and won by British drivers Joe Turney (OK) and Nathan Tye (OK-J).

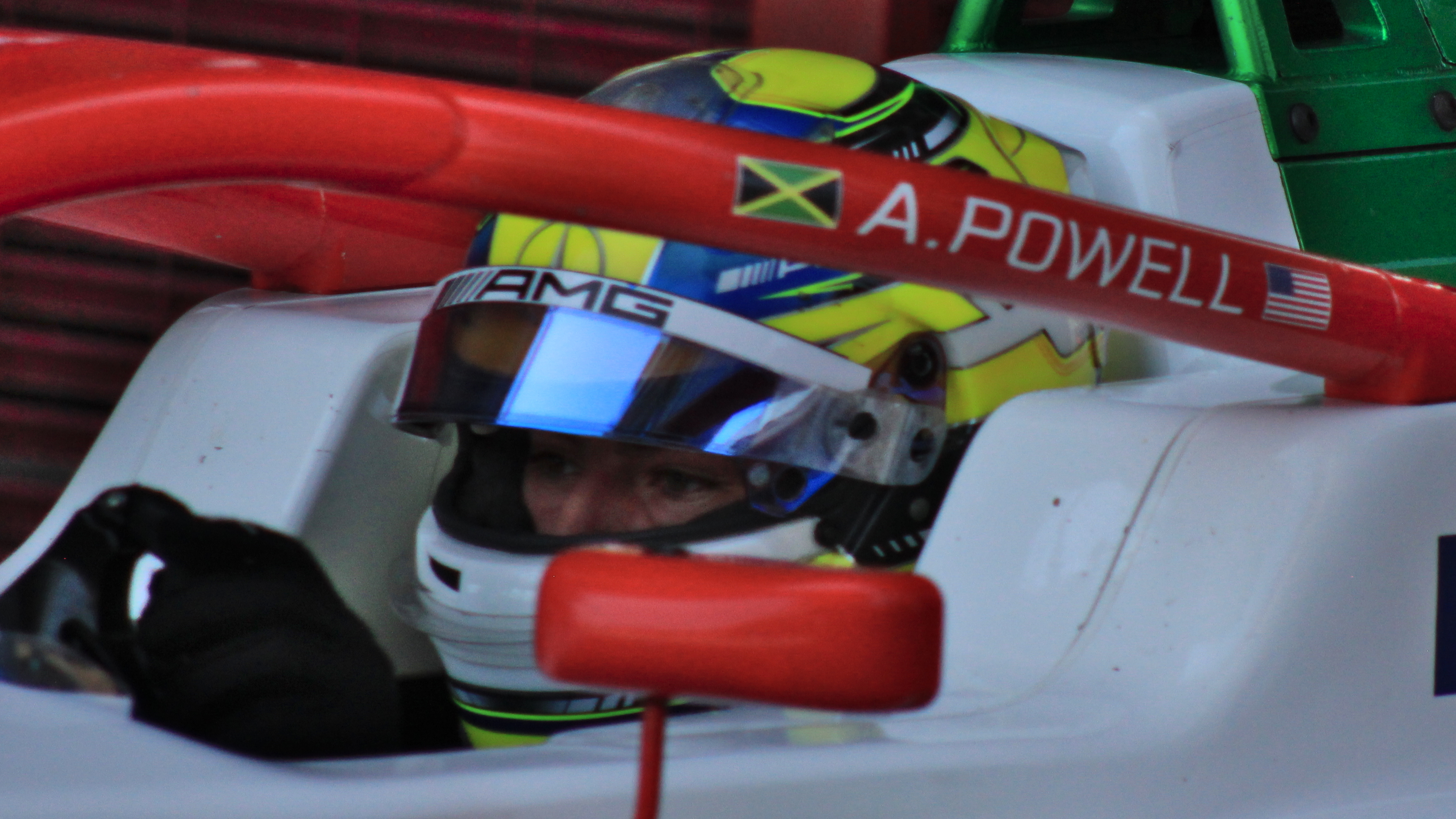
Alex Powell (pictured in 2024) won the OK Euro Series in 2023.

In 2023, COTF founded the Champions of the Future Academy Program (COTFA) in collaboration with F1 Academy, a single-round event at Al Forsan—the series' first expansion beyond continental Europe—in the recently established low-cost OK-National (OK-N) and OKN-Junior (OKN-J) classes, as well as 60 Mini. F1 Academy sponsored the entries of three female drivers in each class, which Fred Smith of Road & Track opined "could completely alter the access women have to Formula One" within a decade. Austin Gale (OK-N), James Anagnostiadis (OKN-J), and Dan Allemann (60 Mini) were the inaugural winners. The five-round Euro Series was held at Valencia, Třinec, Rødby, Cremona, and Franciacorta—each preceding rounds of the European and World Championships and won by Alex Powell in OK and Lewis Wherrell in OK-J. The Třinec round marked the first appearance of CIK-FIA competition in the Czech Republic since the 1990s. TKART described the series that year as "a must" for the leading international drivers and teams.

=== Expansion into eight classes and national series (2024–present) ===
==== 2024–2025: Establishment of gearbox classes ====
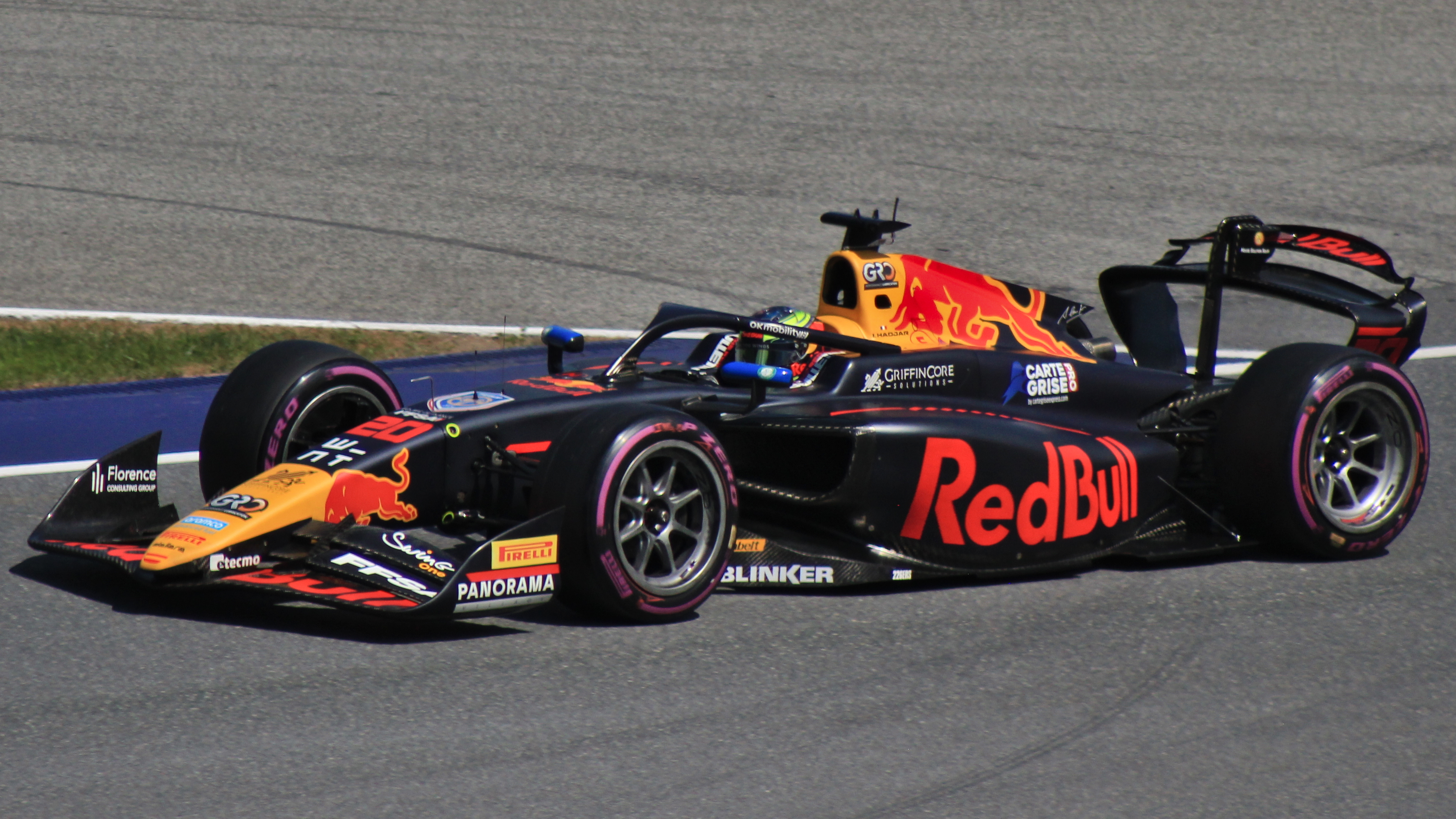
Isack Hadjar served as a driver coach in the 2024 COTFA.

With the creation of Champions of the Future Shifters in 2024, COTF expanded into all eight CIK-FIA classes: OK, OK-J, KZ, KZ2, KZ2-Masters (KZ2-M), (Note: KZ2-Masters is the over-35 gearbox class, established in 2022.) OK-N, OKN-J, and 60 Mini. The one-round championship at Portimão was won by 2020 World Champion Jérémy Iglesias in KZ, Daniel Vasile in KZ2, and Anthony Abbasse in KZ2-M. The Euro Series was again held over five rounds at Valencia, Val d'Argenton, Slovakia, Kristianstad, and PF International, being won for the second time by Turney in OK, and Dries Van Langendonck in OK-J. The COTFA was expanded to six rounds—Cremona, Valencia, Franciacorta, Dubai, Al Ain, and Al Forsain—and was won by Luna Fluxá (OK-N), defending champion Anagnostiadis (OKN-J), and Priam Bruno (60 Mini). Fluxá became the fifth woman in history to win a major senior international karting title, (Note: Luna Fluxá became the fifth woman in history to win a major senior international karting title, after: Susanna Raganelli, World Championship, 1966; Cathy Muller, European Championship, 100 cc, 1979; Sophie Kumpen, Andrea Margutti Trophy, FA, 1995; Beitske Visser, WSK Master Series, KZ2, 2010; Cyndie Allemann also won the CIK-FIA Green Helmet Trophy in 1999, with Marta García winning the Academy Trophy and Trofeo delle Industrie in 2015, all in junior classes.) and the first in a global championship since Susanna Raganelli in 1966. Vroomkart described the COTFA that year as an "innovative model based on inclusion, cost efficiency, and equal competition opportunities", noting its use of driver coaches from FIA Formula 2 and F1 Academy, including Isack Hadjar. It was used to scout driver talent by the Mercedes Junior Team and the Sauber Academy.

The Shifters series expanded to two rounds in 2025 at Valencia and Franciacorta, won by the to-be World Champion in each category: Senna van Walstijn (KZ), Maksim Orlov (KZ2), and Angelo Lombardo (KZ2-M); the former event was marred by controversy as 21 drivers, including six World Champions, boycotted the KZ final in a dispute with the CIK-FIA over its mandating Dunlop tyres. Speedcafe stated that RGMMC "[had] become the unwilling pawn in the middle of the game between the drivers and the FIA" and was unaware of the issue prior—19 of the 23 finalists withdrew or retired mid-race. The CIK-FIA subsequently dropped Dunlop as a tyre supplier. The five-round Euro Series was claimed by two British drivers: (Note: The 2025 Euro Series was held at five venues: Campillos, Portimão, Viterbo, Rødby, and Kristianstad.) reigning junior World Champion Kenzo Craigie (OK) and Noah Baglin (OK-J), the latter overturning a 31-point deficit to William Calleja. Half of the OK-N entrants in COTFA were female, where Markas Šilkūnas was victorious over Chiara Bättig across six rounds at Portimão, Valencia, Jesolo, Slovakia, Al Ain, and Al Forsan; Conor Clancy won in OKN-J as Angelina Simons ended third, whilst Italian prodigy Niccoló Perico dominated in 60 Mini.

==== 2026: National championships ====
In 2026, COTFA is set to expand into the United Kingdom in collaboration with Motorsport UK, forming the four-round British Champions of the Future Academy Programme (British COTFA). It is also due to hold an Emirati title, (Note: Champions of the Future Academy Program UAE (COTFA UAE)) held across two rounds in November 2025 and February 2026 as another feeder series to the international COTFA, and a single-round Macanese title at Coloane in January. (Note: Champions of the Future Academy Program Macau (COTFA Macau)) F1 Academy are set to expand their support to nine drivers in both the British and Emirati series for a total of 27. The Champions of the Future America Series (COTFAS) is set to debut across 10 rounds from January to September in partnership with K1 at K1 Circuit in California and Spring Mountain in Nevada, featuring a US$130,000 prize pool.

== Format ==
The inaugural edition of COTF held four-day weekends: free practice sessions on the Thursday and Friday mornings, qualifying practice on Friday afternoon, qualifying heats on Saturday and Sunday mornings, and pre-finals/finals on the Sunday afternoon. The registration fees were €495 per round for 60 Mini and €595 for OK, OK-J, and KZ2. By 2024, the round fees increased to €675 for the Euro Series and Shifters, with an additional €100 charge for free practice. The season fees for the arrive-and-drive Academy Program that year were €29,000 (OK-N and OKN-J) and €23,000 (60 Mini), including a new chassis, engines, tyres, fuel, a paddock area, logistical support, travel, and accommodation.

=== Euro Series ===
As of 2025, the Euro Series is held over a three-day weekend composed of free practice (FP), time trials (TT), qualifying heats (QH), super heats (SH), and the finals:

- Thursday: FP + TT (morning), QH (afternoon);
- Friday: warm-up + QH;
- Saturday: warm-up + SH (morning), OK-J and OK final (afternoon).

The Euro Series follows the general CIK-FIA points system, with a maximum of: 25 for QH, 25 for SH, and 50 for finals; dead heats are settled via count-back in finals.

=== Shifters ===
As of 2025, Shifters is held over a three-day weekend composed of free practice (FP), qualifying practice (QP), qualifying heats (QH), super heats (SH), and the finals:

- Thursday: FP (morning), QP (afternoon);
- Friday: warm-up + QH;
- Saturday: warm-up + SH (morning), KZ and KZ2 final (afternoon).

Shifters follows the general CIK-FIA points system, with a maximum of: 25 for QH, 25 for SH, and 50 for finals; dead heats are settled via count-back in finals.

=== Academy Program ===
As of 2025, the Academy Program is held over a three-day weekend composed of free practice (FP), qualifying practice (QP), qualifying heats (QH), and two finals in each class:

- Friday: FP;
- Saturday: FP + QP + QH (morning), OKN-J, 60 Mini, and OK-N final one (afternoon);
- Sunday: FP + QP + QH (morning), OKN-J, 60 Mini, and OK-N final two (afternoon).

The Academy Program follows the general CIK-FIA points system, with a maximum of: 25 for QH and 50 for finals; dead heats are settled via count-back in finals.

== Circuits ==
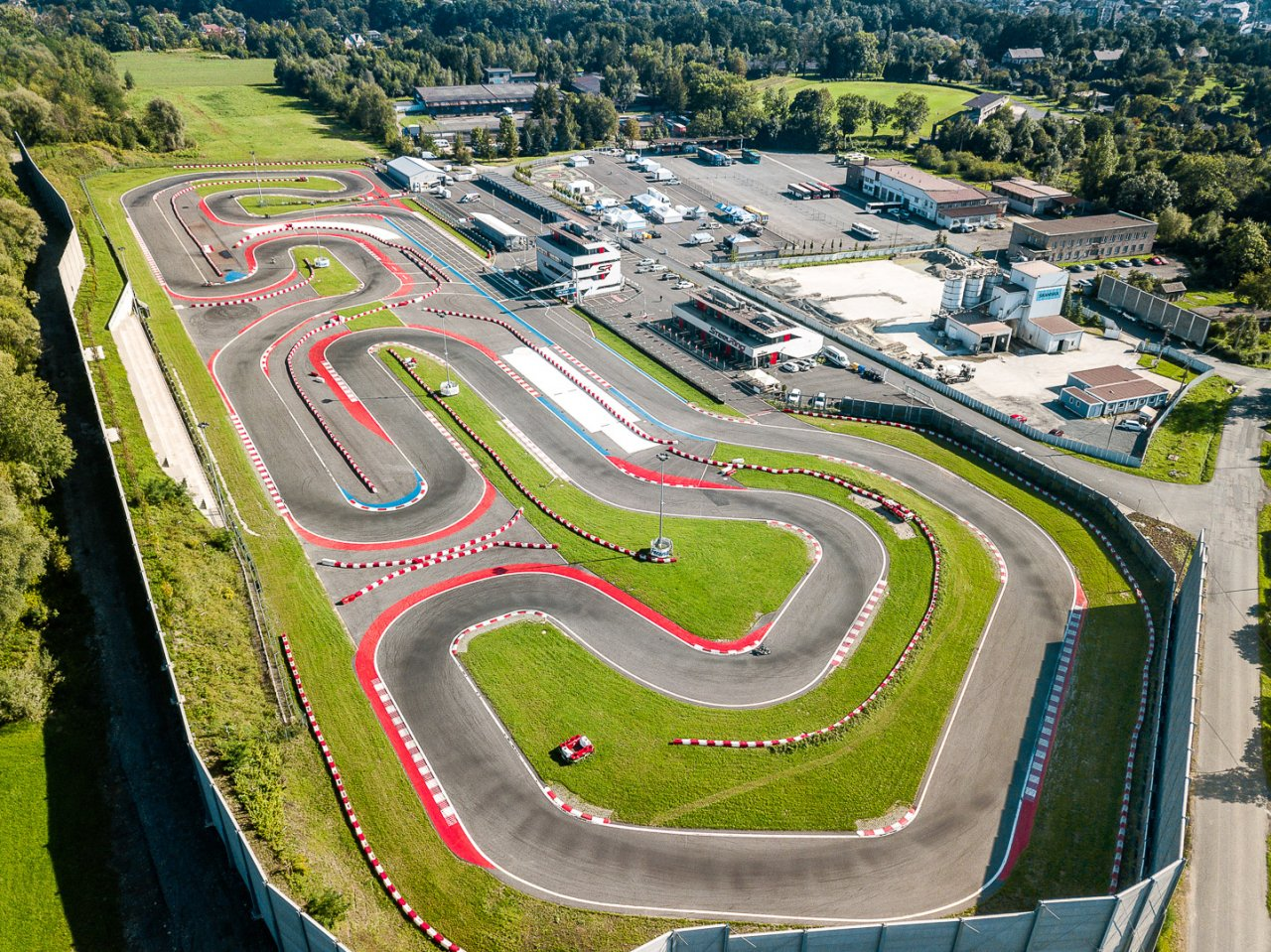
In the 2023 Euro Series, Třinec became the first Czech circuit to feature in CIK-FIA competition since the 1990s.

COTF exclusively operates on kart circuits with homologation from the CIK-FIA. As of 2025, 18 circuits have appeared on the international COTF calendar:

Circuit	Location	App	Span
Circuito Internacional de Zuera	Zuera, Spain	3	2020–2022
Kartódromo Internacional do Algarve	Portimão, Portugal	5	2020–2025
Karting Genk	Genk, Belgium	1	2021
Karting Campillos	Campillos, Spain	2	2021–2025
Franciacorta Karting Track	Bargnana, Italy	5 (Note: Including the one-off Winter Series in 2022.)	2022–2025
Åsum Ring	Kristianstad, Sweden	3	2022–2025
Kartódromo Internacional Lucas Guerrero	Valencia, Spain	5	2023–2025
Steel Ring Třinec	Třinec, Czech Republic	1	2023
Rødby Karting Ring	Rødbyhavn, Denmark	2	2023–2025
Cremona Karting	San Martino del Lago, Italy	2	2023–2024
Al Forsan International Sports Resort	Abu Dhabi, United Arab Emirates	3	2023–2025
Circuit du Val d'Argenton	Argentonnay, France	1	2024
Slovak Karting Center	Orechová Potôň, Slovakia	2	2024–2025
PF International Kart Circuit	(United Kingdom) Brandon, England	1	2024
Dubai Kartodrome	Dubai, United Arab Emirates	1	2024
Al Ain Raceway	Al Ain, United Arab Emirates	2	2024–2025
Leopard Circuit Viterbo	Viterbo, Italy	1	2025
Pista Azzurra	Jesolo, Italy	1	2025

== Live coverage ==
COTF is broadcast on YouTube and Motorsport.tv with live footage, commentary, and interviews for all competitive sessions. The final round of the 2025 Shifters at Franciacorta had a record viewership of over 19 thousand people, with over six thousand watching the opening round of the 2024 Academy Program at Cremona. Apex Timing provides live timing for each COTF event, including free practice and all competitive sessions, via their website.

== International champions ==
Key
Drivers
*	Driver has competed in Formula One		
†	Formula One World Drivers' Champion		
‡	FIA World Champion in an auto racing discipline		
Tyres
B	Bridgestone	L	LeCont
C	Carlisle	M	Maxxis
D	Dunlop	M	MG Tires
G	Goodyear	M	Mojo
K	Komet	V	Vega

=== Euro Series (2020–present) ===
==== OK (2020–present) ====
Year	Champion	Chassis	Engine	Tyres	Wins	Podiums	Points	% Points	Runner-up	Margin	Third place
2020	(Russia) Nikita Bedrin	Tony Kart	Vortex	L	1	3	162	87.097	(United Kingdom) Joe Turney	4	(Brazil) Rafael Câmara*
2021	(Brazil) Rafael Câmara*	KR	IAME	M	1	4	260	79.511	(United Kingdom) Arvid Lindblad*	4	(Bulgaria) Nikola Tsolov
2022	(United Kingdom) Joe Turney	Tony Kart	Vortex	M	2	3	92	66.667	(Italy) Luigi Coluccio	10	(Latvia) Tomass Štolcermanis
2023	(Jamaica) Alex Powell	KR	IAME	M	2	6	231	66.957	(United Kingdom) Kean Nakamura-Berta (Note: Kean Nakamura-Berta is Japanese and Slovak but competed under a British licence.)	19	(United Kingdom) Joe Turney
2024	(United Kingdom) Joe Turney (2)	KR	IAME	M	2	7	315	74.118	(Belgium) Thibaut Ramaekers	68	(Republic of Ireland) Fionn McLaughlin
2025	(United Kingdom) Kenzo Craigie	KR	IAME	M	2	7	333	78.353	(Belgium) Thibaut Ramaekers	56	(Spain) Christian Costoya

==== OK-Junior (2020–present) ====
Year	Champion	Chassis	Engine	Tyres	Wins	Podiums	Points	% Points	Runner-up	Margin	Third place
2020	(United Kingdom) Arvid Lindblad*	KR	IAME	M	1	2	171	91.935	(United States) Ugo Ugochukwu	4	(United Kingdom) Freddie Slater
2021	(United Kingdom) Freddie Slater	Kosmic	Vortex	M	2	2	249	76.147	(Russia) Kirill Kutskov	7	(Russia) Maximilian Popov
2022	(United Kingdom) Nathan Tye	Sodi	TM	V	3	7	124	89.855	Anatoly Khavalkin (Note: Following the Russian invasion of Ukraine in 2022, the FIA banned competitors from racing under the Russian and Belarusian flags, allowing them to compete neutrally.)	37	(Italy) Dmitry Matveev (Note: Dmitry Matveev is Russian but competed under an Italian licence.)
2023	(United Kingdom) Lewis Wherrell	Exprit	TM	V	5	8	243	70.435	(Belgium) Dries Van Langendonck	51	(Belgium) Thibaut Ramaekers
2024	(Belgium) Dries Van Langendonck	Exprit	TM	M	5	7	257	60.471 (Note: Dries Van Langendonck did not contest three rounds of the 2024 OK-Junior Euro Series; he scored 64.250% of available points in the rounds he contested.)	(Austria) Niklas Schaufler	20	(United Kingdom) Kenzo Craigie
2025	(United Kingdom) Noah Baglin	KR	IAME	M	4	6	309	72.706	(Australia) William Calleja	73	(Canada) Ilie Tristan Crisan

==== KZ2 (2020) ====
Year	Champion	Chassis	Engine	Tyres	Wins	Podiums	Points	% Points	Runner-up	Margin	Third place
2020	(Italy) Paolo Ippolito	CRG	TM	V	1	2	87	97.753	(Spain) Antonio Garay Salinas	4	(France) Brice de Gaye

==== 60 Mini (2020) ====
Year	Champion	Chassis	Engine	Tyres	Wins	Podiums	Points	% Points	Runner-up	Margin	Third place
2020	(Russia) Dmitry Matveev	Energy	TM	M	2	2	89	100.000	(Japan) Kean Nakamura-Berta	4	(Slovenia) Mark Kastelic

=== Academy Program (2023–present) ===
==== OK-National (2023–present) ====
Year	Champion	Chassis	Engine	Tyres	Wins	Podiums	Points	% Points	Runner-up	Margin	Third place
2023	(Thailand) Austin Gale	KR	IAME	V	0	2	48	77.419	(Italy) Peter Stiller	2	(Morocco) Suleiman Zanfari
2024	(Spain) Luna Fluxá	KR	IAME	V	10	17	665	87.500	(Lithuania) Markas Šilkūnas	125	(France) Hugo Herrouin
2025	(Lithuania) Markas Šilkūnas	KR	IAME	V	13	18	696	91.579	(Switzerland) Chiara Bättig	149	(Poland) Wojtek Woda

==== OKN-Junior (2023–present) ====
Year	Champion	Chassis	Engine	Tyres	Wins	Podiums	Points	% Points	Runner-up	Margin	Third place
2023	(Australia) James Anagnostiadis	KR	IAME	V	1	2	52	83.871	(United Arab Emirates) Conor Clancy	0 (Note: James Anagnostiadis and Conor Clancy ended the event tied on 52 points, with Anagnostiadis clinching the championship by virtue of final-round finishing position.)	(Australia) Kaiden Higgins
2024	(Australia) James Anagnostiadis (2)	KR	IAME	V	12	18	674	88.684	(South Africa) William Marshall	174	(Thailand) Toby Gale
2025	(United Arab Emirates) Conor Clancy	KR	IAME	V	6	12	519	68.289	(France) Many Nuvolini	84	(Spain) Angelina Simons

==== 60 Mini (2023–present) ====
Year	Champion	Chassis	Engine	Tyres	Wins	Podiums	Points	% Points	Runner-up	Margin	Third place	U10 Champion
2023	(Switzerland) Dan Allemann	Parolin	TM	V	2	2	61	98.387	(Belgium) Priam Bruno	9	(United Arab Emirates) Leonidas Peruzzi	—N/a
2024	(Belgium) Priam Bruno	Parolin	TM	V	9	15	664	87.368	(Italy) Niccoló Perico	102	(Estonia) Albert Tamm	(Italy) Niccoló Perico
2025	(Italy) Niccoló Perico	Parolin	TM	V	11	14	644	84.737 (Note: Niccoló Perico did not contest four rounds of the 2025 60 Mini Academy Program; he scored 84.737% of available points in the rounds he contested.)	(United States) Wynn Godschalk	124	(United States) Zayne Burgess	(United States) Wynn Godschalk

=== Shifters (2024–2025) ===
==== KZ (2024–2025) ====
Year	Champion	Chassis	Engine	Tyres	Wins	Podiums	Points	% Points	Runner-up	Margin	Third place
2024	(France) Jérémy Iglesias	CRG	TM	D	1	1	—N/a	—N/a	(Netherlands) Senna van Walstijn	—N/a	(Spain) Pedro Hiltbrand
2025	(Netherlands) Senna van Walstijn	Sodi	TM	D L	0	4	163	81.500	(France) Jean Nomblot	25	(Italy) Giuseppe Palomba

==== KZ2 (2024–2025) ====
Year	Champion	Chassis	Engine	Tyres	Wins	Podiums	Points	% Points	Runner-up	Margin	Third place
2024	(Romania) Daniel Vasile	Birel ART	TM	D	1	1	—N/a	—N/a	(Estonia) Markus Kajak	—N/a	(Armenia) Artem Severiukhin (Note: Artem Severiukhin is Russian but competed under an Armenian licence.)
2025	Maksim Orlov	Sodi	TM	D L	3	5	180	90.000	(Germany) Max Schleimer	62	(Netherlands) Kasper Schormans

==== KZ2-Masters (2024–2025) ====
Year	Champion	Chassis	Engine	Tyres	Runner-up	Third place
2024	(France) Anthony Abbasse	Sodi	TM	D	(Brazil) André Nicastro	(New Zealand) Daniel Bray
2025	(Italy) Angelo Lombardo	Maranello	TM	L	(Italy) Davide Forè	(Italy) Riccardo Nalon

== National champions ==
=== Macau (2026–present) ===
The Champions of the Future Academy Program Macau (Chinese: 未來冠軍學院賽; COTFA Macau) is the national championship of Macau sanctioned by the Automobile General Association Macao-China (AAMC), which debuted in 2026 at Coloane as a support race to the Macau International Kart Grand Prix.

Year	Champion	Chassis	Engine	Tyres	Runner-up	Third place	Class	Stroke
2026	(Lithuania) Markas Šilkūnas	KR	IAME	L	(Lithuania) Vanesa Šilkūnaitė	(Japan) Seira Kojima	OK-N	125cc
2026	(Hong Kong) John Han	KR	IAME	L	(Philippines) Axel Nocom	(Australia) Jay Kostecki	OKN-J	125cc
2026	(Thailand) Max Zvarich	Parolin	TM	L	(Australia) Ryder Xiong	(Indonesia) Syabil Umar Basalamah	Gr.3	60cc

=== United Arab Emirates (2025–present) ===
The Champions of the Future Academy Program UAE (COTFA UAE) is the national championship of the United Arab Emirates sanctioned by the Emirates Motorsports Organization (EMSO), which is set to debut across two rounds in 2025 and 2026 at Al Forsan.

Season	Champion	Chassis	Engine	Tyres	Runner-up	Third place	Class	Stroke
2025–26	To be determined							

=== United Kingdom (2026–present) ===
The British Champions of the Future Academy Programme (British COTFA) is the national championship of the United Kingdom sanctioned by Motorsport UK, which is set to debut across eight rounds in 2026 at Silverstone, PF International, Larkhall, and Whilton Mill.

Year	Champion	Chassis	Engine	Tyres	Runner-up	Third place	Class	Stroke
2026	To be determined							

=== United States (2026–present) ===
The Champions of the Future American Series (COTFAS) is the national championship of the United States sanctioned by K1, which is set to debut across 10 rounds in 2026 at K1 Circuit and Spring Mountain.

Year	Champion	Chassis	Engine	Tyres	Runner-up	Third place	Class	Stroke
2026	To be determined							

== Winter Series ==
The Champions of the Future Winter Series, also known simply as the Winter Series, was held as a one-off event at Franciacorta on 24–27 February 2022.

Champion	Chassis	Engine	Tyres	Runner-up	Third place	Class	Stroke
(Latvia) Tomass Štolcermanis	Energy	TM	M	(Brazil) Matheus Ferreira	(United Kingdom) Kean Nakamura-Berta	OK	125cc
(Poland) Maciej Gładysz	LN	Vortex	V	(Peru) Andrés Cárdenas	(Russia) Anatoly Khavalkin	OK-J	125cc
(Finland) Simo Puhakka	Tony Kart	Vortex	L	(Italy) Giuseppe Palomba	(Poland) David Liwiński	KZ2	125cc

== Driver development programme ==
In August 2025, RGMMC—in partnership with its sister company Motorsport Performance Academy—announced the creation of the Champions of the Future Racing Academy, a year-long driver development programme led by Augusto Farfus with extensive Formula 4 testing for drivers in their final season of kart racing. The COTFA champions will additionally receive test sessions, with the OK-N champion receiving an F4 test and the OKN-J champion a legends car test.

== See also ==
- Commission Internationale de Karting
- Kart racing
- List of kart racing championships
