= Alex Powell =

Jamaican and American racing driver (born 2007)

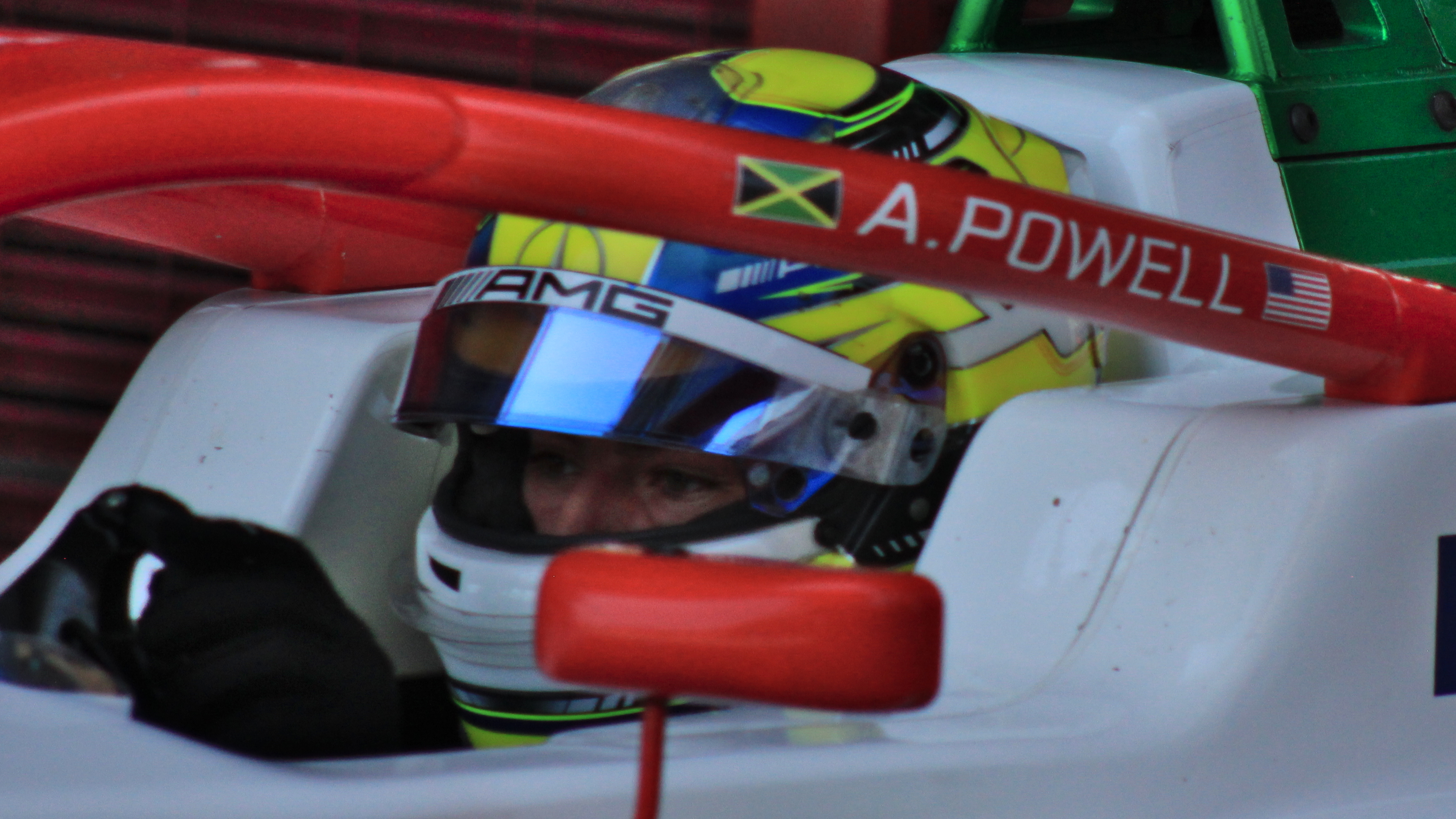
- Powell in 2024
- Nationality: (Jamaica) Jamaican (United States) American
- Born: 18 September 2007 (age 19) Miami, Florida, U.S.
- Relatives: Asafa Powell (cousin)

FIA Formula 3 Championship career
- Debut season: 2026
- Current team: Prema Racing
- Car number: 20
- Starts: 5
- Wins: 0
- Podiums: 1
- Poles: 0
- Fastest laps: 0
- Best finish: 23rd in 2026

Eurocup-3 career
- Debut season: 2026
- Car number: 41
- Former teams: Griffin Core by Campos
- Starts: 13
- Wins: 0
- Podiums: 2
- Poles: 0
- Fastest laps: 0
- Best finish: 7th in 2026

Previous series
- 2026; 2026; 2025; 2025; 2025; 2024; 2024; 2023–2024: Eurocup-3 Winter; FR Middle East; FR European; F4 Spanish; F4 Middle East; Euro 4 / E4; F4 UAE; Italian F4
- Statistics up to date as of 17 November 2026.

Alex Powell (born 18 September 2007) is a Jamaican and American racing driver, who last competed in Eurocup-3 for Griffin Core by Campos.

Powell previously contested the 2025 F4 Middle East Championship, finishing runner-up to Emanuele Olivieri, and is a race winner in Italian F4. He is also a former member of the Mercedes Junior Team.

== Career ==
=== Karting (2015–2023) ===
Powell began competing in the karting championships at the age of eight. After completing various championships in the US and securing great results, he moved to Europe and started racing in Italy in the 60 Mini class. Powell has won the WSK Final Cup, South Garda Winter Cup, Andrea Margutti Trophy and Champions of the Future. He achieved the 2022 CIK-FIA Karting European Championship vice-champion in the OK category. A year, he ranked third in the same championship.

=== Formula 4 (2023–2025) ===
==== 2023 ====
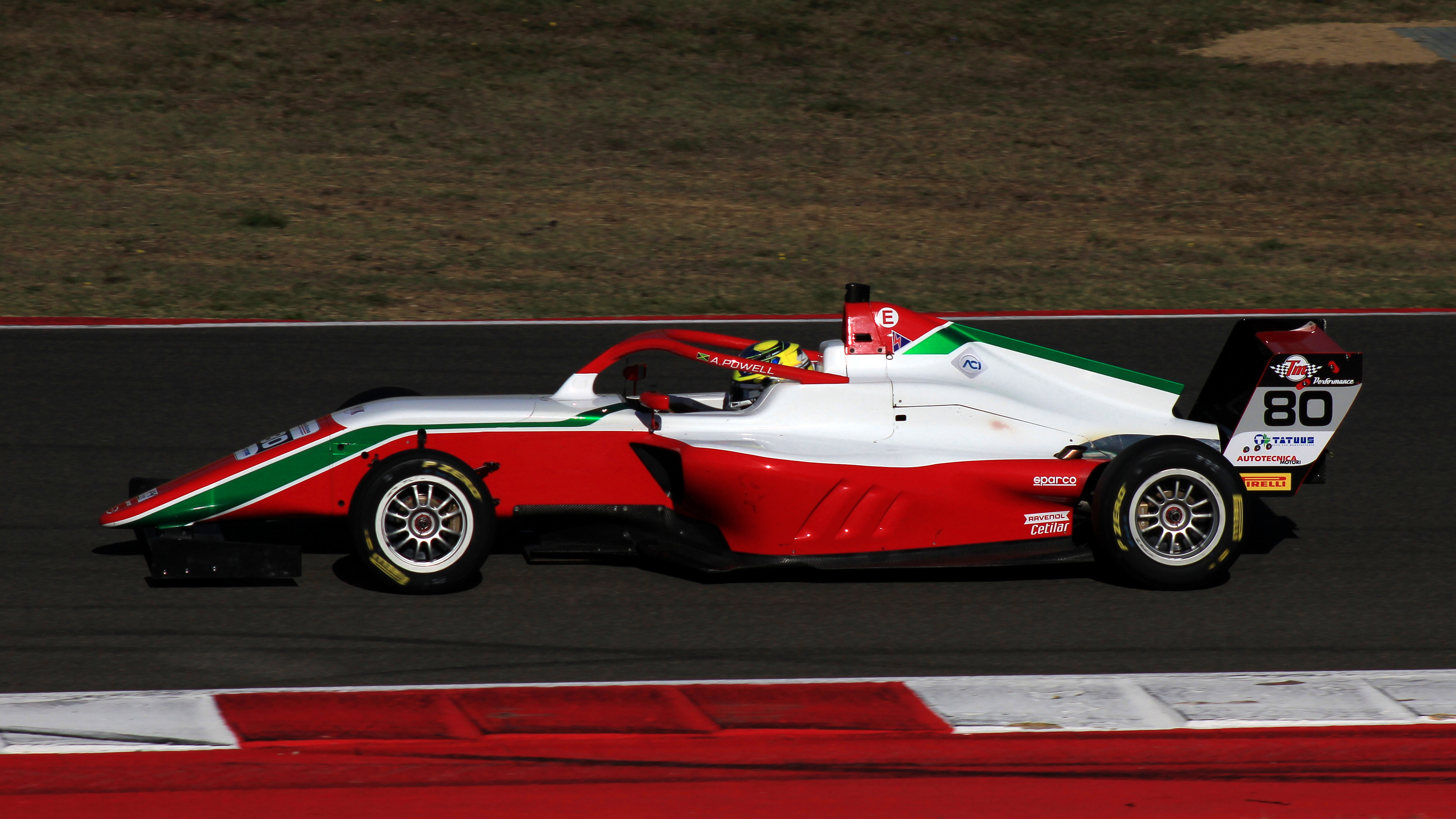
Powell driving at the Mugello Circuit during the 2023 Italian F4 Championship

In 2023, Powell made his debut in single-seaters, racing with Prema in the sixth round of the Italian F4 Championship at Mugello, but he did not manage to score any points. During the next round at Vallelunga Circuit, the season finale, he finished tenth in race three and ultimately ended up 24th in the standings. He also competed in the Formula 4 UAE Trophy round.

==== 2024 ====
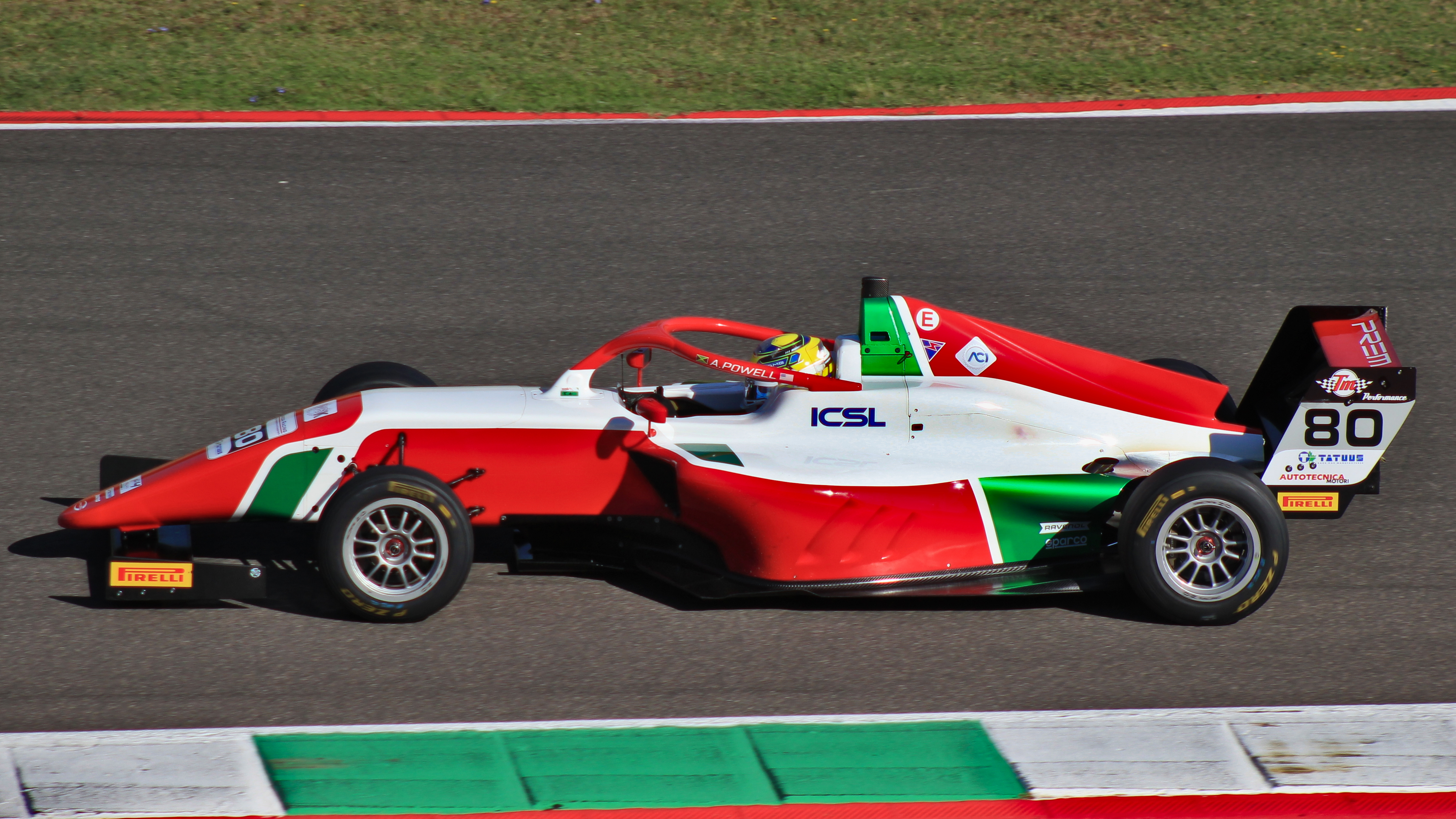
Powell driving at the Mugello Circuit during the 2024 Italian F4 Championship

During pre-season, Powell also competed for the Mumbai Falcons in the 2024 Formula 4 UAE Championship. He achieved his first single-seater win at Dubai Autodrome during the second race. By standing on the podium three other times, Powell finished sixth in the championship.

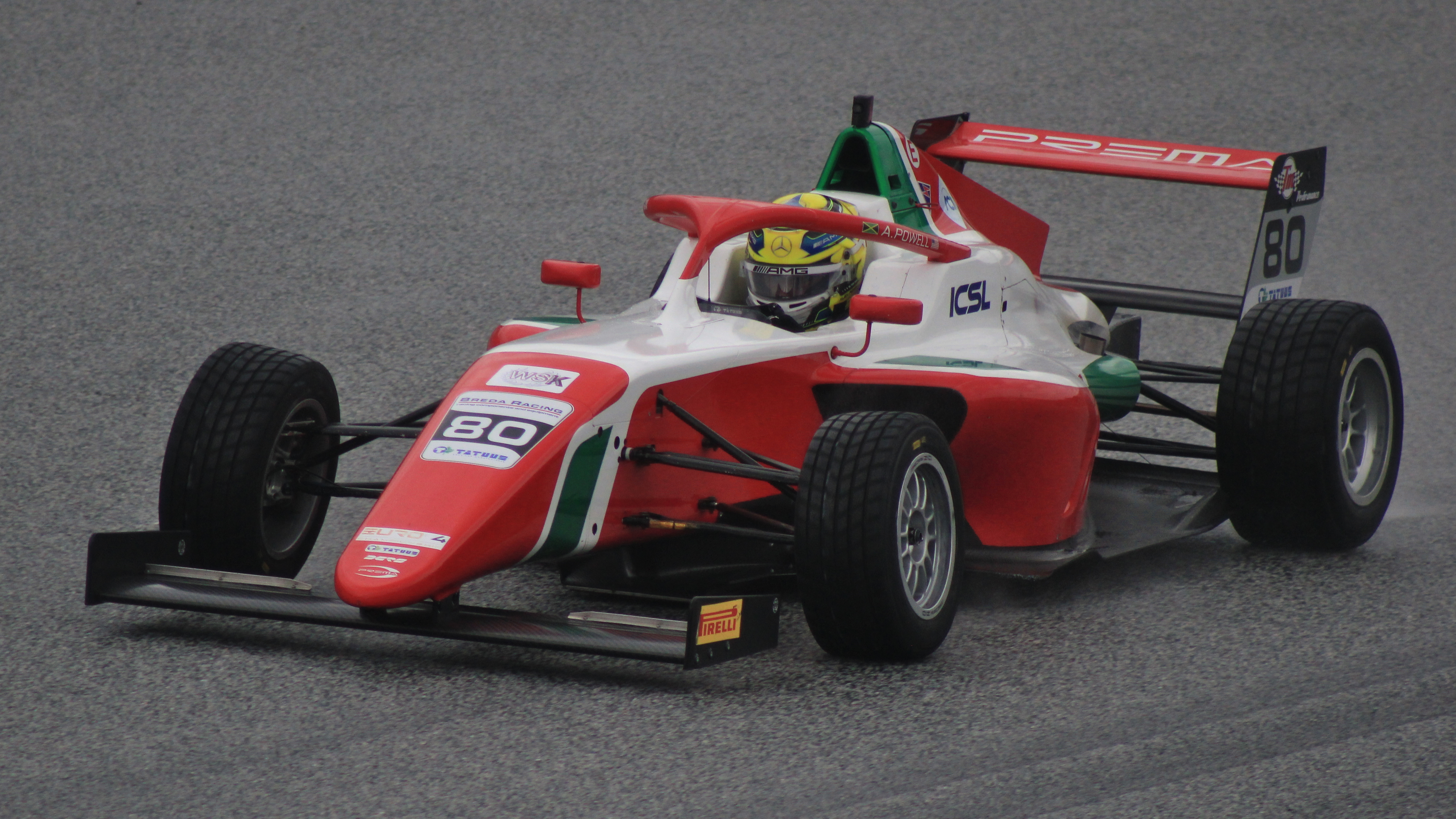
Powell driving at the Red Bull Ring during the 2024 Euro 4 Championship

Powell remained with Prema Racing to race in the Italian F4 for his first full single-seater season. He started the season with a triple runner-up finish in all races in Misano, before earning his first Italian F4 pole in Vallelunga. That weekend he would score two second places, but would not finish on the podium again until the season finale in Monza. Despite failing to win during the campaign, Powell finished fifth in the championship with 176 points and six podiums, as well as being crowned the rookie champion. Competing in Euro 4 as well with Prema, he earned a win during a messy first race in Monza, allowing him to place ninth in the standings.

==== 2025 ====
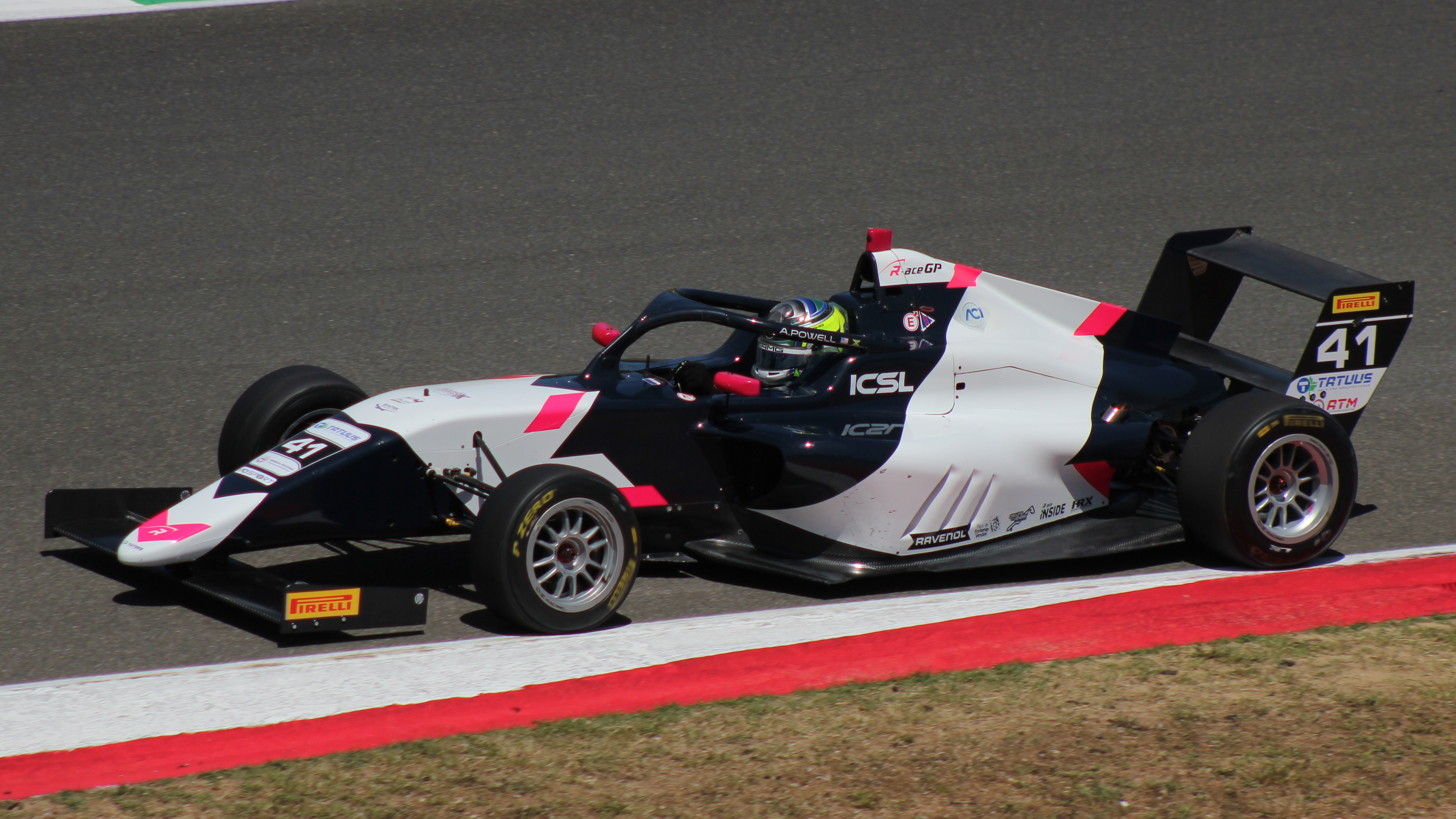
Powell driving at the Mugello Circuit during the 2025 Italian F4 Championship

During pre-season, Powell joined R-ace GP to contest in the 2025 F4 Middle East Championship. He began the season with a pole during the opening round in Yas Marina, but mechanical difficulties derailed his weekend during the first and third races. After a pair of podiums the next round, Powell took his first victories of the season in Dubai, most notably pipping Kean Nakamura-Berta by 0.057s in the third race. A win from pole in the third Yas Marina round kept Powell in the title fight with teammate Emanuele Olivieri, but despite two additional triumphs in the Losail finale, he was unable to bridge the mammoth points gap to Olivieri and finished runner-up in the standings by 58 points.

For his main campaign, Powell remained in Italian F4, but opted to switch to R-ace GP. He endured a difficult start to the season, only taking one podium in Vallelunga throughout the opening two rounds. His highlight of the season came in Mugello where he claimed two wins from pole, and added a further rostrum in the third race. His form faded in the final three rounds, scoring just seven points, and eventually slumped to ninth in the standings with 126 points. Powell also raced in the E4 Championship with the team.

Powell raced for Saintéloc Racing in the first round of the 2025 F4 Spanish Championship.

=== Formula Regional (2025–present) ===
==== 2025 ====
In September 2025, Powell was announced to be racing in the Red Bull Ring round with Prema Racing as a wildcard driver during the Formula Regional European Championship.

==== 2026 ====
During pre-season, Powell competes in the Formula Regional Middle East Trophy with Pinnacle Motorsport.

For his main campaign, Powell moved up to compete in Eurocup-3 with Campos Racing. He joined Prema Racing to compete at that year's November Macau Grand Prix.

=== FIA Formula 3 (2026–present) ===
Powell re-joined Prema Racing for the final two rounds of the 2026 FIA Formula 3 Championship in place of Louis Sharp.

=== Formula One ===
In 2019, Powell was announced by the Mercedes-AMG Petronas Formula 1 Team as part of the Mercedes Junior Team. After seven years, Powell was released by the team at the end of 2025.

== Personal life ==
Powell grew up in Trinidad and Tobago, where his father, Jamaican rally driver John Powell, has lived for 20 plus years. His mother Claudia is Colombian. His cousin is 100-meter sprinter and Olympic gold medalist Asafa Powell.

== Karting record ==
=== Karting career summary ===
| Season | Series | Team | Position |
|---|---|---|---|
| 2016 | SKUSA Pro Tour — Micro Swift | | 6th |
| 2016 | SKUSA SuperNationals — Micro Swift | | 14th |
| 2017 | SKUSA Pro Tour — Micro Swift | | 14th |
| 2017 | SKUSA Pro Tour — Mini Swift | | 14th |
| 2017 | SKUSA SuperNationals — Mini Swift | | 16th |
| 2017 | Florida Winter Tour — Micro Max | | 4th |
| 2017 | Florida Winter Tour — Micro ROK | | 3rd |
| 2018 | SKUSA Pro Tour — Mini Swift | | 17th |
| 2018 | Florida Winter Tour — Mini ROK | | 3rd |
| 2018 | ROK Cup International Final — Mini ROK | Energy Corse | 2nd |
| 2018 | SKUSA SuperNationals — Mini Swift | | 3rd |
| 2018 | SKUSA Winter Series — Mini Swift | | 9th |
| 2018 | WSK Final Cup — OKJ | Energy Corse | 1st |
| 2019 | Italian Championship — 60 Mini | Energy Corse | 3rd |
| 2019 | Andrea Margutti Trophy — 60 Mini | Energy Corse | 5th |
| 2019 | WSK Champions Cup — 60 Mini | Energy Corse | 9th |
| 2019 | South Garda Winter Cup — Mini ROK | Energy Corse | 1st |
| 2019 | WSK Super Master Series — 60 Mini | Energy Corse | 3rd |
| 2019 | WSK Euro Series — 60 Mini | Energy Corse | 5th |
| 2019 | ROK Cup Superfinal — Mini ROK | | 1st |
| 2020 | Andrea Margutti Trophy — 60 Mini | KidiX srl | 1st |
| 2020 | Rotax Max Challenge International Trophy — Junior Max | | 10th |
| 2020 | WSK Champions Cup — OKJ | Energy Corse | 32nd |
| 2020 | South Garda Winter Cup — OKJ | Energy Corse | 30th |
| 2020 | WSK Super Master Series — OKJ | Energy Corse | NC |
| 2020 | WSK Euro Series — OKJ | KR Motorsport | 17th |
| 2020 | CIK-FIA Academy Trophy | | 7th |
| 2020 | WSK Open Cup — OKJ | KR Motorsport | 8th |
| 2020 | Florida Winter Tour — Junior ROK | AKT Racing | 15th |
| 2021 | WSK Champions Cup — OKJ | KR Motorsport | 14th |
| 2021 | WSK Super Master Series — OKJ | KR Motorsport | 3rd |
| 2021 | WSK Euro Series — OKJ | KR Motorsport | 2nd |
| 2021 | Champions of the Future — OKJ | KR Motorsport | 11th |
| 2021 | German Championship — OKJ | SP Motorsport | 14th |
| 2021 | CIK-FIA European Championship — OKJ | KR Motorsport | 4th |
| 2021 | WSK Open Cup — OKJ | KR Motorsport | 7th |
| 2021 | WSK Final Cup — OKJ | KR Motorsport | 3rd |
| 2021 | SKUSA SuperNationals — KA100 Senior | Parolin USA | NC |
| 2021 | SKUSA SuperNationals — X30 Senior | Parolin USA | 15th |
| 2022 | Trofeo Invernal Ayrton Senna — KZ2 | King Racing Team | 3rd |
| 2022 | Winter Series — OK | KR Motorsport | 18th |
| 2022 | WSK Super Master Series — OKJ | KR Motorsport | 10th |
| 2022 | WSK Euro Series — OK | KR Motorsport | 8th |
| 2022 | Champions of the Future — OK | KR Motorsport | 5th |
| 2022 | CIK-FIA European Championship — OK | KR Motorsport | 2nd |
| 2022 | CIK-FIA World Championship — OK | KR Motorsport | 12th |
| 2022 | WSK Open Cup — OK | KR Motorsport | 4th |
| 2022 | WSK Final Cup — OK | KR Motorsport | 7th |
| 2023 | South Garda Winter Cup — KZ2 | Prema Racing | 24th |
| 2023 | WSK Super Master Series — KZ2 | Prema Racing | 47th |
| 2023 | WSK Euro Series — OK | Prema Racing | 9th |
| 2023 | Champions of the Future — OK | Prema Racing | 1st |
| 2023 | CIK-FIA European Championship — KZ2 | Prema Racing | 5th |
| 2023 | CIK-FIA European Championship — OK | Prema Racing | 3rd |
| 2023 | CIK-FIA World Cup — KZ2 | Prema Racing | 2nd |
| 2023 | CIK-FIA World Championship — OK | Prema Racing | DNF |
| 2023 | WSK Open Series — KZ2 | Prema Racing | 8th |

== Racing record ==
=== Racing career summary ===
| Season | Series | Team | Races | Wins | Poles | F/Laps | Podiums | Points | Position |
|---|---|---|---|---|---|---|---|---|---|
| 2023 | Italian F4 Championship | Prema Racing | 6 | 0 | 0 | 0 | 0 | 1 | 24th |
| 2023 | Formula 4 UAE Championship - Trophy Round | Prema Racing | 2 | 0 | 0 | 0 | 0 | N/A | NC |
| 2024 | Formula 4 UAE Championship | Mumbai Falcons Racing Limited | 14 | 1 | 1 | 1 | 4 | 105 | 6th |
| 2024 | Italian F4 Championship | Prema Racing | 21 | 0 | 1 | 0 | 6 | 176 | 5th |
| 2024 | Euro 4 Championship | Prema Racing | 9 | 1 | 0 | 1 | 1 | 49 | 9th |
| 2025 | F4 Middle East Championship | R-ace GP | 15 | 5 | 4 | 2 | 9 | 281 | **2nd** |
| 2025 | Italian F4 Championship | R-ace GP | 20 | 2 | 2 | 1 | 4 | 126 | 9th |
| 2025 | E4 Championship | R-ace GP | 9 | 1 | 1 | 1 | 3 | 86 | 5th |
| 2025 | F4 Spanish Championship | Saintéloc Racing | 1 | 0 | 0 | 0 | 0 | 0 | 42nd |
| 2025 | Formula Regional European Championship | Prema Racing | 2 | 0 | 0 | 0 | 0 | 0 | NC† |
| 2026 | Formula Regional Middle East Trophy | Pinnacle Motorsport | 10 | 0 | 1 | 1 | 3 | 76 | 4th |
| 2026 | Eurocup-3 Spanish Winter Championship | Campos Racing | 9 | 0 | 0 | 1 | 2 | 74 | 5th |
| 2026 | Eurocup-3 | Campos Racing | 13 | 0 | 0 | 0 | 2 | 82 | 7th |
| 2026 | FIA Formula 3 Championship | Prema Racing | 5 | 0 | 0 | 0 | 1 | 14 | 23rd |
| 2026 | Macau Grand Prix | Prema Racing | 0 | 0 | 0 | 0 | 0 | —N/a | TBD |

^{†} As Powell was a guest driver, he was ineligible to score points.
^{*} Season still in progress.

=== Complete Italian F4 Championship results ===
(key) (Races in bold indicate pole position; races in italics indicate fastest lap)

| Year | Entrant | 1 | 2 | 3 | 4 | 5 | 6 | 7 | 8 | 9 | 10 | 11 | 12 | 13 | 14 | 15 | 16 | 17 | 18 | 19 | 20 | 21 | 22 | 23 | 24 | 25 | Pos | Points |
|---|---|---|---|---|---|---|---|---|---|---|---|---|---|---|---|---|---|---|---|---|---|---|---|---|---|---|---|---|
| 2023 | Prema Racing | IMO; 1 | IMO; 2 | IMO; 3 | IMO; 4 | MIS; 1 | MIS; 2 | MIS; 3 | SPA; 1 | SPA; 2 | SPA; 3 | MNZ; 1 | MNZ; 2 | MNZ; 3 | LEC; 1 | LEC; 2 | LEC; 3 | MUG; 1; 28 | MUG; 2; 18 | MUG; 3 Ret | VLL; 1; 14 | VLL; 2; 22 | VLL; 3; 10 | | | | 24th | 1 |
| 2024 | Prema Racing | MIS; 1; 2 | MIS; 2; 2 | MIS; 3; 2 | IMO; 1 Ret | IMO; 2; 29 | IMO; 3; 4 | VLL; 1; 19 | VLL; 2; 2 | **VLL**; **3**; 2 | MUG; 1; 5 | MUG; 2; 6 | MUG; 3; 8 | LEC; 1; 4 | LEC; 2; 9 | LEC; 3; 27 | CAT; 1; 4 | CAT; 2; 7 | CAT; 3; 8 | MNZ; 1; 36 | MNZ; 2; 10 | MNZ; 3; 3 | | | | | 5th | 176 |
| 2025 | R-ace GP | MIS1; 1 | MIS1; 2; 11 | MIS1; 3; 8 | MIS1; 4; 11 | VLL; 1 | VLL; 2; 7 | VLL; 3; 2 | VLL; 4; 4 | MNZ; 1; 16 | MNZ; 2; 6 | MNZ; 3; 18 | MUG; 1; 3 | **MUG**; **2**; 1 | **MUG**; **3**; 1 | IMO; 1; 7 | IMO; 2 C | IMO; 3; 7 | CAT; 1; 10 | CAT; 2; 12 | CAT; 3 C | MIS2; 1; 12 | MIS2; 2; 14 | MIS2; 3 | MIS2; 4; 16 | MIS2; 5; 11 | 9th | 126 |

=== Complete Formula 4 UAE Championship results ===
(key) (Races in bold indicate pole position) (Races in italics indicate fastest lap)

| Year | Team | 1 | 2 | 3 | 4 | 5 | 6 | 7 | 8 | 9 | 10 | 11 | 12 | 13 | 14 | 15 | DC | Points |
|---|---|---|---|---|---|---|---|---|---|---|---|---|---|---|---|---|---|---|
| 2024 | Mumbai Falcons Racing Limited | YMC1; 1; 4 | YMC1; 2; 10 | YMC1; 3; 14 | **YMC2**; **1**; 2 | YMC2; 2; 6 | YMC2; 3; 23 | DUB1; 1; 10 | DUB1; 2; 1 | DUB1; 3; 8 | YMC3; 1; 3 | YMC3; 2; 7 | YMC3; 3; 23 | DUB2; 1; 3 | DUB2; 2; 11 | DUB2; 3 DNS | 6th | 105 |

=== Complete Euro 4/E4 Championship results ===
(key) (Races in bold indicate pole position; races in italics indicate fastest lap)

| Year | Team | 1 | 2 | 3 | 4 | 5 | 6 | 7 | 8 | 9 | DC | Points |
|---|---|---|---|---|---|---|---|---|---|---|---|---|
| 2024 | Prema Racing | MUG; 1; 9 | MUG; 2 Ret | MUG; 3; 21 | RBR; 1; 8 | RBR; 2; 13 | RBR; 3; 5 | MNZ; 1; 1 | MNZ; 2; 6 | MNZ; 3; 14 | 9th | 49 |
| 2025 | R-ace GP | LEC; 1 Ret | LEC; 2; 9 | LEC; 3; 4 | MUG; 1; 2 | MUG; 2; 1 | **MUG**; **3**; 2 | MNZ; 1; 11 | MNZ; 2; 10 | MNZ; 3; 5 | 5th | 86 |

=== Complete F4 Middle East Championship results ===
(key) (Races in bold indicate pole position; races in italics indicate fastest lap)

| Year | Team | 1 | 2 | 3 | 4 | 5 | 6 | 7 | 8 | 9 | 10 | 11 | 12 | 13 | 14 | 15 | DC | Points |
|---|---|---|---|---|---|---|---|---|---|---|---|---|---|---|---|---|---|---|
| 2025 | R-ace GP | YMC1; 1; 27† | YMC1; 2; 4 | **YMC1**; **3**; 12 | YMC2; 1; 4 | YMC2; 2; 3 | YMC2; 3; 3 | DUB; 1; 9 | DUB; 2; 1 | **DUB**; **3**; 1 | YMC3; 1; 2 | YMC3; 2; 3 | **YMC3**; **3**; 1 | LUS; 1; 5 | LUS; 2; 1 | **LUS**; **3**; 1 | 2nd | 281 |

=== Complete Formula Regional European Championship results ===
(key) (Races in bold indicate pole position) (Races in italics indicate fastest lap)

| Year | Team | 1 | 2 | 3 | 4 | 5 | 6 | 7 | 8 | 9 | 10 | 11 | 12 | 13 | 14 | 15 | 16 | 17 | 18 | 19 | 20 | DC | Points |
|---|---|---|---|---|---|---|---|---|---|---|---|---|---|---|---|---|---|---|---|---|---|---|---|
| 2025 | Prema Racing | MIS; 1 | MIS; 2 | SPA; 1 | SPA; 2 | ZAN; 1 | ZAN; 2 | HUN; 1 | HUN; 2 | LEC; 1 | LEC; 2 | IMO; 1 | IMO; 2 | RBR; 1; 22 | RBR; 2; 21 | CAT; 1 | CAT; 2 | HOC; 1 | HOC; 2 | MNZ; 1 | MNZ; 2 | NC† | 0 |

^{†} As Powell was a guest driver, he was ineligible to score points.

=== Complete Formula Regional Middle East Trophy results ===
(key) (Races in bold indicate pole position) (Races in italics indicate fastest lap)

| Year | Entrant | 1 | 2 | 3 | 4 | 5 | 6 | 7 | 8 | 9 | 10 | 11 | 12 | DC | Points |
|---|---|---|---|---|---|---|---|---|---|---|---|---|---|---|---|
| 2026 | Pinnacle Motorsport | YMC1; 1; 6 | YMC1; 2; 23 | YMC1; 3; 2 | YMC2; 1; 3 | YMC2; 2; 28 | YMC2; 3; 6 | DUB; 1; 12 | DUB; 2 Ret | **DUB**; **3** DNS | LUS; 1; 4 | LUS; 2 C | LUS; 3; 3 | 4th | 76 |

=== Complete Eurocup-3 Spanish Winter Championship results ===
(key) (Races in bold indicate pole position) (Races in italics indicate fastest lap)

| Year | Team | 1 | 2 | 3 | 4 | 5 | 6 | 7 | 8 | 9 | DC | Points |
|---|---|---|---|---|---|---|---|---|---|---|---|---|
| 2026 | Campos Racing | POR; 1; 12 | POR; SPR; 3 | POR; 2; 4 | JAR; 1; 4 | JAR; SPR; 3 | JAR; 2; 6 | ARA; 1; 4 | ARA; SPR; 6 | ARA; 2; 6 | 5th | 74 |

=== Complete Eurocup-3 results ===
(key) (Races in bold indicate pole position; races in italics indicate fastest lap)

| Year | Team | 1 | 2 | 3 | 4 | 5 | 6 | 7 | 8 | 9 | 10 | 11 | 12 | 13 | 14 | 15 | 16 | 17 | 18 | 19 | DC | Points |
|---|---|---|---|---|---|---|---|---|---|---|---|---|---|---|---|---|---|---|---|---|---|---|
| 2026 | Griffin Core | LEC; 1; 3 | LEC; SR; 9 | LEC; 2; 5 | POR; 1 Ret | POR; 2 Ret | IMO; 1; 2 | IMO; SR; 7 | IMO; 2; 11 | MNZ; 1; 10 | MNZ; 2; 4 | SIL; 1 | SIL; 2 | JER; 1; 4 | JER; SR; 9 | JER; 2; 7 | HUN; 1 | HUN; 2 | CAT; 1 | CAT; 2 | 7th | 82 |

=== Complete FIA Formula 3 Championship results ===
(key) (Races in bold indicate pole position) (Races in italics indicate fastest lap)

| Year | Entrant | 1 | 2 | 3 | 4 | 5 | 6 | 7 | 8 | 9 | 10 | 11 | 12 | 13 | 14 | 15 | 16 | 17 | 18 | 19 | DC | Points |
|---|---|---|---|---|---|---|---|---|---|---|---|---|---|---|---|---|---|---|---|---|---|---|
| 2026 | Prema Racing | MEL; SPR | MEL; FEA | MON; SPR | MON; FEA | CAT; SPR | CAT; FEA | RBR; SPR | RBR; FEA | SIL; SPR | SIL; FEA | SPA; SPR | SPA; FEA | HUN; SPR | HUN; FEA | MNZ; SPR; 19 | MNZ; FEA; 14 | MAD; SPR; 3 | MAD; FEA1; 7 | MAD; FEA2; 13 | 23rd | 14 |

=== Complete Macau Grand Prix results ===
| Year | Team | Car | Qualifying | Quali Race | Main Race |
|---|---|---|---|---|---|
| 2026 | (Italy) Prema Racing | Tatuus T-326 | TBD | TBD | TBD |
