= Kean Nakamura-Berta =

Japanese and Slovak racing driver (born 2007)

- 中村 紀庵 ベルタ
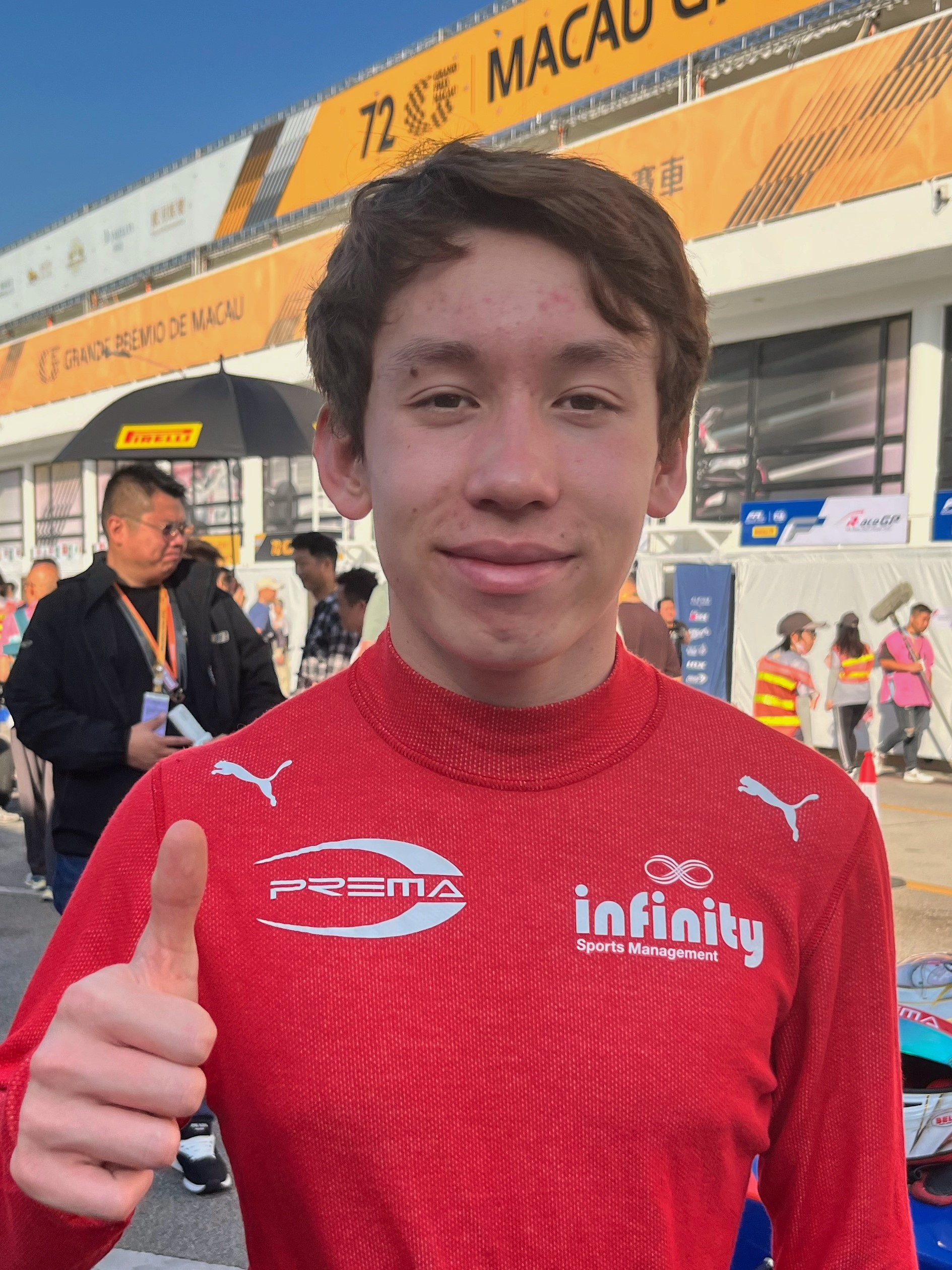
- Nakamura-Berta at the 2025 FIA F4 World Cup
- Born: 12 November 2007 (age 19); London, England
- Nationality: (Japan) Japanese; (Slovakia) Slovak; (United Kingdom) British (Note: Nakamura-Berta primarily competes under a British licence.)

Formula Regional European Championship career
- Debut season: 2026
- Current team: Prema
- Car number: 51
- Starts: 19
- Wins: 3
- Podiums: 8
- Poles: 5
- Fastest laps: 2
- Best finish: 3rd in 2026

Previous series
- 2026; 2026; 2025; 2024–2025; 2024–2025; 2024; 2023: FR European; FR Middle East; F4 Middle East; Euro 4; Italian F4; F4 UAE; F4 South East Asia

Championship titles
- 2026; 2026; 2025; 2025: Macau Grand Prix; FR Middle East; Euro 4; Italian F4
- Statistics up to date as of 17 September 2026.

Kean Nakamura-Berta (Japanese: 中村 紀庵 ベルタ, Hepburn: Nakamura Kian Beruta; born 12 November 2007), also known by his initials KNB, is a Japanese and Slovak racing driver who is set to compete under the British flag in the FIA Formula 3 Championship for Trident as part of the Williams Driver Academy.

Born and raised in London to a Slovak father and Japanese mother, Nakamura-Berta began competitive kart racing aged seven. After a successful karting career—culminating in his victories at the World Championship in 2021 (OK-J) and the European Championship in 2022 (OK)—Nakamura-Berta graduated to junior formulae. A member of the Alpine Academy from 2022 until 2024 in Formula 4, he was runner-up in the 2024 UAE Championship and dominated both the Italian and E4 Championships in 2025. Progressing to Formula Regional, he finished third in the European Championship, and won both the Middle East Trophy and the Macau Grand Prix in 2026.

== Early life ==
Nakamura-Berta was born in London to a Japanese mother and a Slovak father. Nakamura-Berta lived in Japan until the age of five, when he moved back to London.

== Racing career ==
=== Karting (2018–2023) ===
Nakamura-Berta had a very successful karting career. He took his first European title at the IAME International final at Le Mans in 2019 in the X30 Mini Category. For 2020, he joined the 60 Mini category. He came second in the WSK Euro Series, and second in the WSK Super Master Series. In 2021, he joined the OK-Junior category, and in October, he won the Karting World Championship in the category. By the end of the season, Nakamura-Berta was competing in the OK category, and he won his first OK title at the South Garda Winter Cup. In 2022, he won the Karting European Championship, controversially beating his Kart Republic teammate Alex Powell. For 2023, Nakamura-Berta continued in OK Karting whilst making some KZ2 appearances. He came second in the OK category in Champions of the Future, and came sixth in KZ2 in the World Cup and European Championship.

=== Formula 4 (2023–2025) ===
==== 2023: Debut in South East Asia ====
At the end of 2023, Nakamura-Berta made an appearance at the final two rounds of the Formula 4 South East Asia Championship with Prema Racing. He claimed two pole positions, three fastest laps and a best finish of second over the course of six races.

==== 2024: Rookie season ====
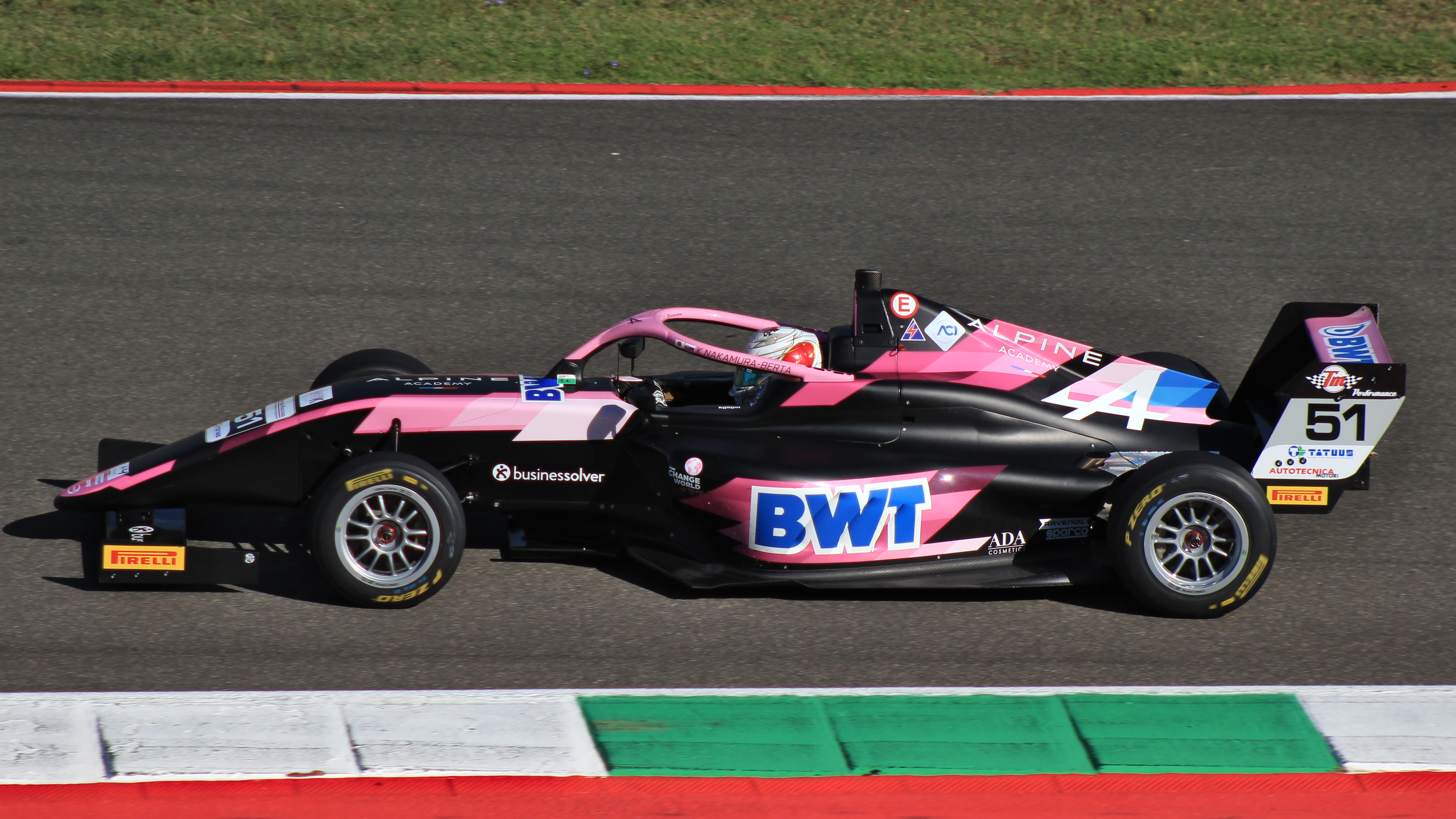
Nakamura-Berta racing at the Mugello Circuit during the 2024 Italian F4 Championship

During the winter, Nakamura-Berta competed in the Formula 4 UAE Championship. He opened his account by scoring his first single-seater victory during the first race in Yas Marina, before earning a double podium for the second Yas Marina round. Another double podium followed in the first Dubai round, but his title hopes were hampered by a double retirement in the next round. He managed to take another win and a second place in the Dubai second round, which allowed him to finish runner-up in the standings to Freddie Slater.

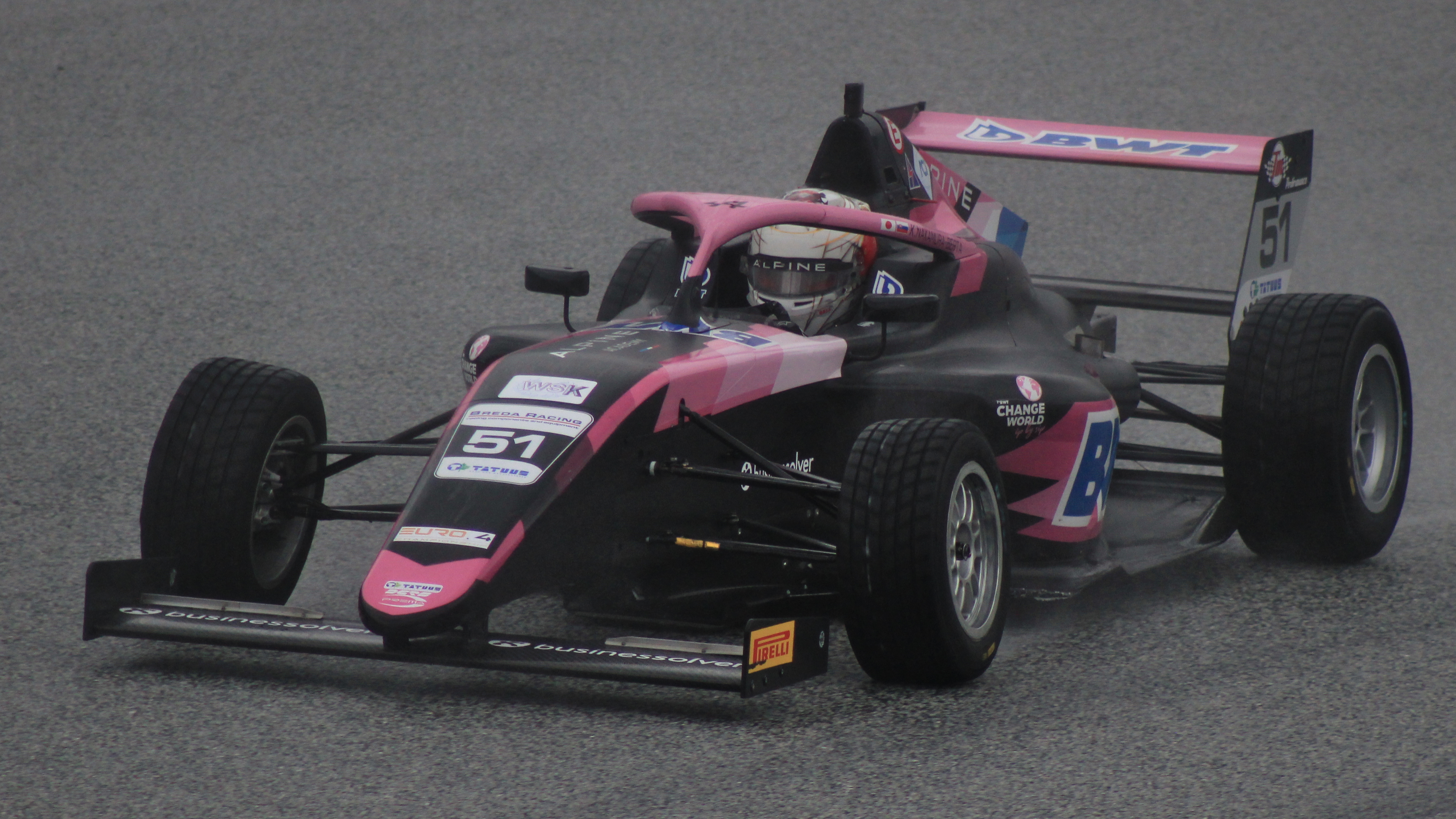
Nakamura-Berta racing at the Red Bull Ring during the 2024 Euro 4 Championship

For his main campaign, Nakamura-Berta would be competing in both Italian F4 and Euro 4 for Prema Racing for the coming season. In the first half of the season, he only took one podium during the opening round in Imola, but was able to take his first win in a damp race in Paul Ricard. He earned three more podiums following that and placed sixth in the standings, missing out on the rookie title to Alex Powell by six points. In Euro 4, Nakamura-Berta had a more successful campaign, racking up one win in Monza and ended third in the overall standings, as well as being the rookie champion.

==== 2025: Maiden titles in F4 ====
Nakamura-Berta returned to Middle East during the off-season, racing in the F4 Middle East Championship with Mumbai Falcons. He started with a triple second place across all three rounds during the opening Yas Marina round, He continued his consistent form throughout the next rounds by scoring podiums in five of the next six races, but a win continued to elude him as he was pipped by Alex Powell in the final race of the Dubai round. However, Nakamura-Berta broke his duck by taking his first win of the year during the third Yas Marina round following a penalty for Emanuele Olivieri. With a further podium in Qatar, Nakamura-Berta finished third in the standings with one win and ten podiums.

Nakamura-Berta continued in Formula 4 for his main campaign in 2025, remaining with Prema Racing to contest Italian F4 and the E4 championships with them.

=== Formula Regional (2026) ===
At the start of the season, Nakamura-Berta stepped up to compete in the Formula Regional Middle East Trophy with Mumbai Falcons.

For his main campaign, Nakamura-Berta remained with Prema to race in the Formula Regional European Championship. At the end of the year, he raced with SJM Theodore Racing at the Macau Grand Prix.

=== Formula Three (2027) ===
Nakamura-Berta will move up to FIA Formula 3 in 2027 with Trident.

=== Formula One ===
In 2022, Nakamura-Berta became an Alpine Affiliate, and in 2023 he became a fully-fledged member of the Alpine Academy. He was dropped from the academy at the end of 2024.

In January 2026, Nakamura-Berta joined the Williams Driver Academy.

== Karting record ==
=== Karting career summary ===
Season	Series	Team	Position
2018	Kartmasters British Grand Prix — Honda Cadet	Project One	4th
2019	LGM Series — IAME Cadet		3rd
2019	Kartmasters British Grand Prix — Honda Cadet	Project One Racing	2nd
2019	Kartmasters British Grand Prix — IAME Cadet	Fusion Motorsport	1st
2019	British Championships — IAME Cadet	Fusion Motorsport	3rd
2019	British Championships — Honda Cadet	Project One Racing	2nd
2019	IAME International Final — X30 Mini	Project One Racing	1st
2019	WSK Open Cup — 60 Mini	Tony Kart Racing Team	30th
2019	WSK Final Cup — 60 Mini	Tony Kart Racing Team	
2020	WSK Champions Cup — 60 Mini	Team Driver Racing Kart	33rd
2020	WSK Super Master Series — 60 Mini	Team Driver Racing Kart	2nd
2020	WSK Euro Series — 60 Mini	Team Driver Racing Kart	2nd
2020	WSK Open Cup — 60 Mini	Team Driver Racing Kart	13th
2020	Champions of the Future – 60 Mini	Team Driver Racing Kart	2nd
2021	WSK Champions Cup — OK-J	Forza Racing	2nd
2021	WSK Super Master Series — OK-J		7th
2021	WSK Euro Series — OK-J		55th
2021	CIK-FIA European Championship — OK-J		37th
2021	CIK-FIA World Championship — OK-J		1st
2021	WSK Open Cup — OK-J		25th
2021	WSK Final Cup — OK		14th
2021	Champions of the Future — OK-J		17th
2021	South Garda Winter Cup — OK	Forza Racing	1st
2022	Champions of the Future Winter Series — OK	Kart Republic Motorsport	3rd
2022	CIK-FIA European Championship — OK	Kart Republic Motorsport	1st
2022	CIK-FIA World Championship — OK	Kart Republic Motorsport	31st
2022	South Garda Winter Cup — KZ2		7th
2023	WSK Super Master Series — KZ2	Prema Racing	52nd
2023	CIK-FIA European Championship — OK	Prema Racing	5th
2023	CIK-FIA European Championship — KZ2	Prema Racing	6th
2023	CIK-FIA World Championship — OK	Prema Racing	3rd
2023	CIK-FIA World Cup — KZ2	Prema Racing	6th
2023	WSK Open Series — KZ2	Prema Racing	7th

== Racing record ==
=== Racing career summary ===
Season	Series	Team	Races	Wins	Poles	F/Laps	Podiums	Points	Position
2023	Formula 4 South East Asia Championship	Prema Racing	6	0	2	2	1	48	6th
2024	Formula 4 UAE Championship	Mumbai Falcons Racing Limited	15	2	2	3	7	168	2nd
2024	Italian F4 Championship	Prema Racing	21	1	0	0	5	170	6th
2024	Euro 4 Championship	Prema Racing	9	1	1	1	3	97	3rd
2025	F4 Middle East Championship	Mumbai Falcons Racing Limited	15	1	0	2	10	273	3rd
2025	Italian F4 Championship	Prema Racing	20	9	9	3	17	342	1st
2025	E4 Championship	Prema Racing	9	4	7	1	8	181	1st
2025	FIA F4 World Cup	—N/a	1	0	0	0	0	—N/a	DNF
2026	Formula Regional Middle East Trophy	Mumbai Falcons Racing Limited	11	2	3	3	6	151	1st
2026	Formula Regional European Championship	Prema Racing	19	3	5	2	8	201	3rd
2026	Macau Grand Prix	SJM Theodore Racing	1	1	0	0	1	—N/a	1st
2027	FIA Formula 3 Championship	Trident	0	0	0	0	0	0	TBD

=== Complete Formula 4 South East Asia Championship results ===
(key) (Races in bold indicate pole position; races in italics indicate fastest lap)

Year	Entrant	1	2	3	4	5	6	7	8	9	10	11	Pos	Points
2023	Prema Racing	ZZIC1; 1	ZZIC1; 2	ZZIC1; 3	MAC; 1	MAC; 2	SEP1; 1; 5	SEP1; 2; 6	SEP1; 3; 2	**SEP2**; **1**; 4	SEP2; 2 Ret	**SEP2**; **3**; 14	6th	48

=== Complete Formula 4 UAE Championship results ===
(key) (Races in bold indicate pole position; races in italics indicate fastest lap)

Year	Entrant	1	2	3	4	5	6	7	8	9	10	11	12	13	14	15	Pos	Points
2024	Mumbai Falcons Racing Limited	YMC1; 1; 1	YMC1; 2; 8	YMC1; 3; 5	YMC2; 1; 12	YMC2; 2; 2	YMC2; 3; 3	DUB1; 1; 2	DUB1; 2; 6	DUB1; 3; 3	YMC3; 1; 5	YMC3; 2 Ret	YMC3; 3 Ret	**DUB2**; **1**; 1	DUB2; 2; 9	**DUB2**; **3**; 2	2nd	168

=== Complete Italian F4 Championship results ===
(key) (Races in bold indicate pole position; races in italics indicate fastest lap)

Year	Entrant	1	2	3	4	5	6	7	8	9	10	11	12	13	14	15	16	17	18	19	20	21	22	23	24	25	Pos	Points
2024	Prema Racing	MIS; 1; 8	MIS; 2 Ret	MIS; 3; 3	IMO; 1 Ret	IMO; 2; 5	IMO; 3; 6	VLL; 1 Ret	VLL; 2; 11	VLL; 3; 8	MUG; 1; 6	MUG; 2; 15	MUG; 3; 5	LEC; 1; 5	LEC; 2; 8	LEC; 3; 1	CAT; 1; 11	CAT; 2; 4	CAT; 3; 3	MNZ; 1; 3	MNZ; 2; 2	MNZ; 3; 4					6th	170
2025	Prema Racing	MIS1; 1	**MIS1**; **2**; 1	**MIS1**; **3**; 1	**MIS1**; **4**; 1	**VLL**; **1**; 1	VLL; 2; 1	VLL; 3	**VLL**; **4**; 11	MNZ; 1; 3	**MNZ**; **2**; 1	**MNZ**; **3**; 16	**MUG**; **1**; 1	MUG; 2; 6	MUG; 3; 3	IMO; 1; 3	IMO; 2 C	IMO; 3; 2	**CAT**; **1**; 1	CAT; 2; 2	CAT; 3 C	MIS2; 1; 2	MIS2; 2; 3	MIS2; 3	MIS2; 4; 2	MIS2; 5; 1	1st	342

=== Complete Euro 4 / E4 Championship results ===
(key) (Races in bold indicate pole position; races in italics indicate fastest lap)

Year	Entrant	1	2	3	4	5	6	7	8	9	Pos	Points
2024	Prema Racing	MUG; 1; 4	MUG; 2; 11	MUG; 3; 4	RBR; 1; 3	RBR; 2; 7	RBR; 3 Ret	MNZ; 1; 4	MNZ; 2; 1	**MNZ**; **3**; 3	3rd	97
2025	Prema Racing	**LEC**; **1**; 2	**LEC**; **2**; 3	LEC; 3; 2	**MUG**; **1**; 1	**MUG**; **2**; 2	MUG; 3; 4	**MNZ**; **1**; 1	**MNZ**; **2**; 1	**MNZ**; **3**; 1	1st	181

=== Complete F4 Middle East Championship results ===
(key) (Races in bold indicate pole position; races in italics indicate fastest lap)

Year	Entrant	1	2	3	4	5	6	7	8	9	10	11	12	13	14	15	Pos	Points
2025	Mumbai Falcons Racing Limited	YMC1; 1; 2	YMC1; 2; 2	YMC1; 3; 2	YMC2; 1; 3	YMC2; 2; 5	YMC2; 3; 2	DUB; 1; 3	DUB; 2; 3	DUB; 3; 2	YMC3; 1; 1	YMC3; 2; 21	YMC3; 3; 4	LUS; 1; 2	LUS; 2; 4	LUS; 3; 4	3rd	273

=== Complete FIA F4 World Cup results ===
Year	Car	Qualifying	Quali race	Main race
2025	Mygale M21-F4	2nd	Ret	Ret

=== Complete Formula Regional Middle East Trophy results ===
(key) (Races in bold indicate pole position; races in italics indicate fastest lap)

Year	Entrant	1	2	3	4	5	6	7	8	9	10	11	12	Pos	Points
2026	Mumbai Falcons Racing Limited	YMC1; 1; 4	YMC1; 2 Ret	YMC1; 3; 5	**YMC2**; **1**; 2	YMC2; 2; 5	YMC2; 3; 2	DUB; 1; 3	DUB; 2 Ret	DUB; 3; 2	**LUS**; **1**; 1	LUS; 2 C	**LUS**; **3**; 1	1st	151

=== Complete Formula Regional European Championship results ===
(key) (Races in bold indicate pole position; races in italics indicate points for the fastest lap of the top-10 finishers)

Year	Entrant	1	2	3	4	5	6	7	8	9	10	11	12	13	14	15	16	17	18	19	20	Pos	Points
2026	Prema Racing	**RBR**; **1**; 1	RBR; 2; 6	**RBR**; **3**; 25†	ZAN; 1 DSQ	**ZAN**; **2**; 2	SPA; 1; 3	SPA; 2 C	SPA; 3; 5	**MNZ**; **1**; 1	MNZ; 2; 5	MNZ; 3 Ret	HUN; 1; 10	HUN; 2; 3	**LEC**; **1**; 1	LEC; 2; 3	IMO; 1; 15	IMO; 2; 10	IMO; 3; 9	HOC; 1; 2	HOC; 2; 6	3rd	201

^{†} Did not finish, but was classified as he had completed more than 90% of the race distance.

=== Complete Macau Grand Prix results ===
Year	Team	Car	Qualifying	Quali Race	Main Race
2026	(Macau) SJM Theodore Racing	Tatuus T-326	TBD	TBD	TBD

=== Complete FIA Formula 3 Championship results ===
(key) (Races in bold indicate pole position) (Races in italics indicate fastest lap)

Year	Entrant	1	2	3	4	5	6	7	8	9	10	11	12	13	14	15	16	17	18	19	20	DC	Points
2027	Trident	BHR; SPR	BHR; FEA	JED; SPR	JED; FEA	MEL; SPR	MEL; FEA	MTL; SPR	MTL; FEA	MON; SPR	MON; FEA	SIL; SPR	SIL; FEA	RBR; SPR	RBR; FEA	MNZ; SPR	MNZ; FEA	MAD; SPR	MAD; FEA	IST; SPR	IST; FEA	TBD	TBD

== Notes ==
Sporting positions
Preceded by Freddie Slater	Italian F4 Championship; Champion; 2025	Succeeded by Incumbent
Preceded by Akshay Bohra (Euro 4)	E4 Championship; Champion; 2025	Succeeded by Incumbent
Preceded by Evan Giltaire (FRMEC)	Formula Regional Middle East Trophy; Champion; 2026	Succeeded by Incumbent
