= K1 Speed =

Indoor go-kart operator

- Type: Private
- Industry: Family Entertainment, Indoor Go-Karting
- Founded: 2003
- Founder: David Danglard, Susan Danglard
- Headquarters: Irvine, California
- Number of locations: 107
- Area served: United States, Canada, England, Scotland, Mexico, South Korea, Puerto Rico, Italy, China and France
- Website: www.k1speed.com

K1 Speed is an American indoor kart circuit operator based in Irvine, California. The company was co-founded in 2003 by David Danglard and Susan Danglard, who had previously worked in the fashion industry. That same year, K1 Speed opened their first go-kart track in Carlsbad, California.

== Overview ==
The Italian OTL electric karts used at K1 Speed can reach speeds of up to 45 miles per hour, while the junior karts can reach speeds of up to 20 miles per hour.

In late 2018, K1 Speed said that they were partnering with virtual and augmented reality brand Oculus to use their Oculus Rift virtual reality headset and several cameras monitoring a track to give K1 Speed's go-kart users a virtual racing experience.

K1 Speed has 107 locations across the United States, Canada, England, Mexico, South Korea, Puerto Rico, Italy, China, and France. Overall, the company has centers in 32 U.S. states and 10 countries. K1 Speed offers various party packages for group events including birthdays for kids, teens, and adults, corporate team building, holiday parties, bachelor(ette) parties, and more.

== Challenge GP Leagues ==
Every K1 Speed center runs its own junior, teen and adult race leagues, called Challenge GP. At the end of the 12-month season, the top three drivers from each class and center advance to their respective state championship. The top three division finishers at the state championships are invited to the National Championships, held at K1 Circuit Winchester. The national podium finishers then earn their place on the grid for the K1 Speed E-World Championship.

=== K1 Speed E-World Championship ===
The K1 Speed E-World Championship claims to feature the largest single-event prize pool in all of competitive karting with $79,000 up for grabs between the three divisions.

=== K1-on-1 Karting Lessons ===
K1-on-1 lessons are 1-hour coaching sessions with instructors.
