= 2024 Italian F4 Championship =

Motorsport event

The 2024 Italian F4 Championship was the eleventh season of the Italian F4 Championship, a multi-race Formula 4-level racing series. It was the third season ran using the Tatuus F4-T421 since its introduction to all Formula 4 championships in 2022.

Freddie Slater claimed the Driver's Championship, clinching the title at Race 2 at the Circuit de Barcelona-Catalunya while Alex Powell won the Rookies' Championship at the third race at the Monza Circuit, the final race of the season. Both drove for Prema Racing, who won the Teams' Championship for the third consecutive year. Slater won 15 races, breaking the record for most race wins in a season, previously held by Andrea Kimi Antonelli with 13 wins in 2022.

== Teams and drivers ==
Team	No.	Driver	Class	Rounds
(Netherlands) Van Amersfoort Racing	2	(United States) Hudson Schwartz	R	6–7
(Netherlands) Van Amersfoort Racing	6	(Japan) Hiyu Yamakoshi		All
(Netherlands) Van Amersfoort Racing	8	(Serbia) Andrija Kostić	R	1–6
(Netherlands) Van Amersfoort Racing	36	(Sweden) Gustav Jonsson		All
(Netherlands) Van Amersfoort Racing	55	(Italy) Alvise Rodella		1–5
(Netherlands) Van Amersfoort Racing	86	(Australia) Dante Vinci	R	7
(Netherlands) Van Amersfoort Racing	88	(Netherlands) Lin Hodenius		All
(Germany) PHM AIX Racing	3	(Italy) Maksimilian Popov (Note: Popov is Russian, but he competes under an Italian licence as Russian national emblems were banned by the FIA following the Russian invasion of Ukraine.)	R	All
(Germany) PHM AIX Racing	9	(United States) Everett Stack		All
(Germany) PHM AIX Racing	16	(Italy) Davide Larini		All
(Germany) PHM AIX Racing	49	(Serbia) Andrej Petrović	R	1–4
(Germany) PHM AIX Racing	70	(Australia) Kamal Mrad	R	1–5
(France) ART Grand Prix	4	(Philippines) Bianca Bustamante	W	7
(France) ART Grand Prix	58	(United States) Lia Block	R W	7
(San Marino) AKM Motorsport	5	(Poland) Wiktor Dobrzański		2–3, 5–6
(San Marino) AKM Motorsport	5	(Italy) Mattia Marchiante	R	7
(San Marino) AKM Motorsport	52	(Ukraine) Oleksandr Savinkov	R	All
(San Marino) AKM Motorsport	53	(Saudi Arabia) Omar Aldereyaane	R	4
(San Marino) AKM Motorsport	73	(Italy) Emanuele Olivieri	R	All
(France) R-ace GP	7	(Finland) Luka Sammalisto	R	1–4, 6–7
(France) R-ace GP	77	(Italy) Enzo Yeh (Note: Yeh is a Taiwanese driver competing under an Italian licence.)	R	All
(Germany) US Racing	10	(Brazil) Matheus Ferreira		1–5
(Germany) US Racing	12	(Australia) Gianmarco Pradel		All
(Germany) US Racing	19	(Singapore) Kabir Anurag	R	All
(Germany) US Racing	31	(India) Akshay Bohra		All
(Germany) US Racing	45	(Australia) Jack Beeton		All
(Germany) US Racing	62	(United Kingdom) Edu Robinson (Note: Robinson is a Spanish-British driver competing under a British licence.)	R	6–7
(Germany) US Racing	71	(Germany) Maxim Rehm	R	All
(Romania) Real Racing	11	(Romania) Luca Viișoreanu	R	All
(Romania) Real Racing	95	(Romania) Andrei Dună		1–3, 7
(Italy) Prema Racing	14	(United Arab Emirates) Rashid Al Dhaheri		All
(Italy) Prema Racing	17	(Ukraine) Oleksandr Bondarev	R	6–7
(Italy) Prema Racing	27	(United Kingdom) Freddie Slater		All
(Italy) Prema Racing	33	(Latvia) Tomass Štolcermanis	R	All
(Italy) Prema Racing	50	(United Kingdom) Dion Gowda (Note: Gowda is an Indian driver competing under a British licence.)		All
(Italy) Prema Racing	51	(United Kingdom) Kean Nakamura-Berta (Note: Nakamura-Berta is a Japanese-Slovak driver competing under a British licence.)	R	All
(Italy) Prema Racing	80	(United States) Alex Powell (Note: Powell is a Jamaican-American driver competing under an American licence.)	R	All
(Italy) BVM Racing	18	(Czech Republic) Jan Koller	R	1–2, 5, 7
(Switzerland) Jenzer Motorsport	20	(Slovakia) Matúš Ryba	R	2
(Switzerland) Jenzer Motorsport	21	(Switzerland) Ethan Ischer		1–6
(Switzerland) Jenzer Motorsport	22	(Switzerland) Enea Frey	R	All
(Switzerland) Jenzer Motorsport	23	(Netherlands) Reno Francot		All
(Switzerland) Jenzer Motorsport	24	(Italy) Shimo Zhang (Note: Zhang is a Chinese driver competing under an Italian licence.)	R	1–3
(Switzerland) Jenzer Motorsport	24	(Brazil) Ciro Sobral		7
(Switzerland) Jenzer Motorsport	25	(Austria) Oscar Wurz	R	4
(Switzerland) Jenzer Motorsport	25	(United Kingdom) Bart Harrison		7
(Switzerland) Maffi Racing	28	(Kyrgyzstan) Kirill Kutskov	R	7
(Switzerland) Maffi Racing	29	(Switzerland) Nathanaël Berreby	R	All
(Switzerland) Maffi Racing	54	(United States) Gabriel Holguin (Note: Holguin is a Venezuelan driver competing under an American licence.)	R	1–6
(Italy) Cram Motorsport	34	(Portugal) Francisco Macedo	R	2
(Italy) Cram Motorsport	35	(United Kingdom) Kai Daryanani (Note: Daryanani is an Indian driver competing under a British licence.)		1, 5–7
(Italy) Cram Motorsport	37	(Brazil) Filippo Fiorentino	R	3–5
(Slovenia) AS Motorsport	62	(United Kingdom) Edu Robinson (Note: Robinson is a Spanish-British driver competing under a British licence.)	R	1–5
(Slovenia) AS Motorsport	64	(Poland) Wiktor Dobrzański		4

Icon	Legend
R	Rookie
W	Woman Trophy

- Ádám Hideg was announced to compete with Jenzer Motorsport before switching to the F4 Spanish Championship.

== Race calendar and results ==
The calendar was revealed on 4 August 2023. In September 2023, the round at Mugello Circuit was postponed by one week.

Round		Circuit	Date	Pole position	Fastest lap	Winning driver	Winning team	Rookie winner	Supporting
1	R1	(Italy) Misano World Circuit	4 May	(United Kingdom) Freddie Slater	(Latvia) Tomass Štolcermanis	(United Kingdom) Freddie Slater	(Italy) Prema Racing	(United States) Alex Powell	Italian GT Championship; TCR Italy Touring Car Championship; Porsche Carrera Cup Italia
1	R2	(Italy) Misano World Circuit	4 May	(United Kingdom) Freddie Slater	(United Kingdom) Freddie Slater	(United Kingdom) Freddie Slater	(Italy) Prema Racing	(United States) Alex Powell	Italian GT Championship; TCR Italy Touring Car Championship; Porsche Carrera Cup Italia
1	R3	(Italy) Misano World Circuit	5 May	(United Kingdom) Freddie Slater	(United Kingdom) Freddie Slater	(United Kingdom) Freddie Slater	(Italy) Prema Racing	(United States) Alex Powell	Italian GT Championship; TCR Italy Touring Car Championship; Porsche Carrera Cup Italia
2	R1	(Italy) Imola Circuit	1 June	(Japan) Hiyu Yamakoshi	(Japan) Hiyu Yamakoshi	(Japan) Hiyu Yamakoshi (Note: Freddie Slater originally won the race but was disqualified for a technical non-conformity. Yamakoshi inherited the win.)	(Netherlands) Van Amersfoort Racing	(Latvia) Tomass Štolcermanis	Italian GT Championship; Porsche Carrera Cup Italia; F2000 Italian Formula Trophy
2	R2	(Italy) Imola Circuit	2 June	(Japan) Hiyu Yamakoshi	(India) Akshay Bohra	(Japan) Hiyu Yamakoshi	(Netherlands) Van Amersfoort Racing	(Latvia) Tomass Štolcermanis	Italian GT Championship; Porsche Carrera Cup Italia; F2000 Italian Formula Trophy
2	R3	(Italy) Imola Circuit	2 June	(Japan) Hiyu Yamakoshi	(Japan) Hiyu Yamakoshi	(United Kingdom) Freddie Slater	(Italy) Prema Racing	(Germany) Maxim Rehm	Italian GT Championship; Porsche Carrera Cup Italia; F2000 Italian Formula Trophy
3	R1	(Italy) Vallelunga Circuit	15 June	(Australia) Jack Beeton	(United Kingdom) Freddie Slater	(United Kingdom) Freddie Slater	(Italy) Prema Racing	(Latvia) Tomass Štolcermanis	Italian GT Championship; F2000 Italian Formula Trophy
3	R2	(Italy) Vallelunga Circuit	16 June	(United Kingdom) Freddie Slater	(United Kingdom) Freddie Slater	(United Kingdom) Freddie Slater	(Italy) Prema Racing	(United States) Alex Powell	Italian GT Championship; F2000 Italian Formula Trophy
3	R3	(Italy) Vallelunga Circuit	16 June	(United States) Alex Powell	(United Kingdom) Freddie Slater	(United Kingdom) Freddie Slater	(Italy) Prema Racing	(United States) Alex Powell	Italian GT Championship; F2000 Italian Formula Trophy
4	R1	(Italy) Mugello Circuit	13 July	(India) Akshay Bohra	(United Kingdom) Freddie Slater	(United Kingdom) Freddie Slater	(Italy) Prema Racing	(United States) Alex Powell	Formula Regional European Championship; Italian GT Championship; TCR Italy Touring Car Championship; Porsche Carrera Cup Italia
4	R2	(Italy) Mugello Circuit	13 July	(United Kingdom) Freddie Slater	(United Arab Emirates) Rashid Al Dhaheri	(United Kingdom) Freddie Slater	(Italy) Prema Racing	(United States) Alex Powell	Formula Regional European Championship; Italian GT Championship; TCR Italy Touring Car Championship; Porsche Carrera Cup Italia
4	R3	(Italy) Mugello Circuit	14 July	(United Kingdom) Freddie Slater	(Australia) Jack Beeton	(United Kingdom) Freddie Slater	(Italy) Prema Racing	(United Kingdom) Kean Nakamura-Berta	Formula Regional European Championship; Italian GT Championship; TCR Italy Touring Car Championship; Porsche Carrera Cup Italia
5	R1	(France) Circuit Paul Ricard	20 July	(India) Akshay Bohra	(Australia) Jack Beeton	(India) Akshay Bohra	(Germany) US Racing	(United States) Alex Powell	International GT Open; Euroformula Open Championship; GT Cup Open Europe; Formula Regional European Championship
5	R2	(France) Circuit Paul Ricard	21 July	(India) Akshay Bohra	(United Kingdom) Freddie Slater	(United Kingdom) Freddie Slater	(Italy) Prema Racing	(United Kingdom) Kean Nakamura-Berta	International GT Open; Euroformula Open Championship; GT Cup Open Europe; Formula Regional European Championship
5	R3	(France) Circuit Paul Ricard	21 July	(United Kingdom) Freddie Slater	(Switzerland) Ethan Ischer	(United Kingdom) Kean Nakamura-Berta	(Italy) Prema Racing	(United Kingdom) Kean Nakamura-Berta	International GT Open; Euroformula Open Championship; GT Cup Open Europe; Formula Regional European Championship
6	R1	(Spain) Circuit de Barcelona-Catalunya	28 September	(India) Akshay Bohra (Note: Jack Beeton set the fastest lap in the Qualifying 1 but received a two-place grid penalty following the previous race. Bohra inherited the pole position.)	(United Kingdom) Freddie Slater	(United Kingdom) Freddie Slater	(Italy) Prema Racing	(United States) Alex Powell	International GT Open; Euroformula Open Championship; GT Cup Open Europe; Formula Regional European Championship
6	R2	(Spain) Circuit de Barcelona-Catalunya	29 September	(United Kingdom) Freddie Slater	(Japan) Hiyu Yamakoshi	(United Kingdom) Freddie Slater	(Italy) Prema Racing	(United Kingdom) Kean Nakamura-Berta	International GT Open; Euroformula Open Championship; GT Cup Open Europe; Formula Regional European Championship
6	R3	(Spain) Circuit de Barcelona-Catalunya	29 September	(United Kingdom) Freddie Slater	(Australia) Jack Beeton	(Australia) Jack Beeton	(Germany) US Racing	(United Kingdom) Kean Nakamura-Berta	International GT Open; Euroformula Open Championship; GT Cup Open Europe; Formula Regional European Championship
7	R1	(Italy) Monza Circuit	26 October	(Australia) Jack Beeton	(United Kingdom) Freddie Slater	(United Kingdom) Freddie Slater	(Italy) Prema Racing	(United Kingdom) Kean Nakamura-Berta	Formula Regional European Championship; Italian GT Championship; TCR Italy Touring Car Championship
7	R2	(Italy) Monza Circuit	26 October	(United Kingdom) Freddie Slater	(India) Akshay Bohra	(United Kingdom) Freddie Slater	(Italy) Prema Racing	(United Kingdom) Kean Nakamura-Berta	Formula Regional European Championship; Italian GT Championship; TCR Italy Touring Car Championship
7	R3	(Italy) Monza Circuit	27 October	(United Kingdom) Freddie Slater	(United Kingdom) Freddie Slater	(Australia) Gianmarco Pradel	(Germany) US Racing	(United States) Alex Powell	Formula Regional European Championship; Italian GT Championship; TCR Italy Touring Car Championship

== Championship standings ==
Points are awarded to the top 10 classified finishers in each race. No points are awarded for pole position or fastest lap. The final classifications for the individual standings is obtained by summing up the scores on the 16 best results obtained during the races held.

Position	**1st**	**2nd**	**3rd**	**4th**	**5th**	**6th**	**7th**	**8th**	**9th**	**10th**
Points	25	18	15	12	10	8	6	4	2	1

=== Drivers' championship ===
Pos	Driver	MIS (Italy)			IMO (Italy)			VLL (Italy)			MUG (Italy)			LEC (France)			CAT (Spain)			MNZ (Italy)			Pts
Pos	Driver	R1	R2	R3	R1	R2	R3	R1	R2	R3	R1	R2	R3	R1	R2	R3	R1	R2	R3	R1	R2	R3	Pts
1	(United Kingdom) Freddie Slater	**1**	**1**	**1**	DSQ	30	1	1	**1**	1	1	**1**	**1**	DNS	1	**21**	1	**1**	**4**	1	**1**	**2**	383
2	(Australia) Jack Beeton	5	Ret	17	4	35†	2	**2**	17	5	2	13	2	2	2	33†	2	Ret	1	**2**	3	7	222
3	(Japan) Hiyu Yamakoshi	6	4	4	**1**	**1**	**27**	3	3	3	4	5	4	6	5	22	3	2	6	12	18	15	220
4	(India) Akshay Bohra	4	3	16	2	2	5	7	7	6	**3**	2	6	**1**	**3**	25	**Ret**	3	Ret	4	4	5	217
5	(United States) Alex Powell	2	2	2	Ret	29	4	19	2	**2**	5	6	8	4	9	27	4	7	8	36	10	3	176
6	(United Kingdom) Kean Nakamura-Berta	8	Ret	3	Ret	5	6	Ret	11	8	6	15	5	5	8	1	11	4	3	3	2	4	170
7	(Australia) Gianmarco Pradel	3	12	6	9	Ret	20	9	8	7	14	8	17	12	7	28	9	5	2	6	Ret	1	110
8	(Sweden) Gustav Jonsson	16	Ret	10	7	7	9	6	10	10	8	4	3	29	4	2	16	6	7	7	22	9	108
9	(Latvia) Tomass Štolcermanis	9	8	14	5	4	8	8	4	12	7	9	9	10	Ret	3	Ret	8	5	14	6	10	97
10	(United Arab Emirates) Rashid Al Dhaheri	10	5	5	8	6	Ret	4	Ret	9	16	3	7	7	6	26	10	9	14	5	21	14	95
11	(United Kingdom) Dion Gowda	11	7	9	3	3	10	20	9	14	15	11	10	8	11	7	7	17	16	18	Ret	8	62
12	(Brazil) Matheus Ferreira	15	Ret	11	11	DNS	WD	5	5	4	10	10	Ret	3	Ret	34†							49
13	(Germany) Maxim Rehm	18	17	25	6	36†	3	31†	16	16	12	Ret	11	9	Ret	24	5	12	12	8	13	Ret	39
14	(Netherlands) Reno Francot	12	9	7	Ret	8	24	22	14	17	9	12	Ret	11	Ret	4	12	20	Ret	34†	17	6	34
15	(Switzerland) Ethan Ischer	13	6	18	Ret	11	31†	30†	6	Ret	13	7	18	20	14	31	14	13	19				22
16	(Switzerland) Enea Frey	20	29†	Ret	Ret	18	14	26†	15	13	Ret	Ret	31†	Ret	10	5	26†	Ret	10	13	14	Ret	12
17	(Italy) Emanuele Olivieri	19	16	26	10	10	11	10	21	Ret	Ret	27	12	16	12	6	Ret	11	11	17	29	33†	11
18	(Finland) Luka Sammalisto	25	11	31†	12	32†	7	27†	Ret	22	WD	WD	WD				Ret	23	Ret	10	8	12	11
19	(United Kingdom) Edu Robinson	35†	21	20	19	19	17	15	28	26	27	17	29	24	22	14	Ret	14	13	Ret	5	22	10
20	(Singapore) Kabir Anurag	29	23	Ret	Ret	22	16	29†	18	33†	17	Ret	15	13	19	29	6	Ret	Ret	9	25	29	10
21	(Italy) Maksimilian Popov	21	13	13	15	15	26	28†	13	15	18	14	16	18	Ret	9	8	10	21	Ret	9	27	9
22	(Italy) Davide Larini	14	Ret	8	17	9	Ret	11	12	11	24	Ret	13	14	17	Ret	13	16	9	21	11	11	8
23	(Italy) Enzo Yeh	7	15	22	Ret	31	13	Ret	22	20	31†	18	19	17	13	30	17	Ret	20	35†	26	30	6
24	(Kyrgyzstan) Kirill Kutskov																			19	7	13	6
25	(Netherlands) Lin Hodenius	22	22	Ret	20	13	30	21	20	Ret	22	28†	23	Ret	Ret	8	15	15	15	24	28	31†	4
26	(Serbia) Andrej Petrović	17	10	12	14	12	12	Ret	Ret	19	20	29	14										1
27	(United States) Everett Stack	31	19	27	Ret	20	18	16	Ret	31	26	25	21	DNS	21	10	24	Ret	25	16	19	21	1
28	(Italy) Alvise Rodella	23	Ret	19	16	16	Ret	12	25	27	19	Ret	Ret	21	18	11							0
29	(Romania) Luca Viișoreanu	28	27†	30†	24	23	21	13	29	23	11	19	24	15	24	16	20	21	17	31	16	32†	0
30	(Ukraine) Oleksandr Bondarev																19	25	18	11	Ret	24	0
31	(United Kingdom) Kai Daryanani	Ret	18	Ret										31	20	12	Ret	22	23	25	Ret	17	0
32	(Switzerland) Nathanaël Berreby	Ret	26	28	Ret	27	32†	24	31	32†	32†	26	32†	30	Ret	20	22	Ret	28	27	12	26	0
33	(Italy) Shimo Zhang	24	14	15	13	33†	15	Ret	19	18													0
34	(Poland) Wiktor Dobrzański				21	26	23	17	27	24	Ret	29†	26	27	26	13	WD	WD	WD				0
35	(Serbia) Andrija Kostić	27	Ret	Ret	22	14	22	Ret	Ret	21	23	16	27	19	15	32	25	18	24				0
36	(Brazil) Filippo Fiorentino							14	26	25	Ret	Ret	30	23	Ret	23							0
37	(United Kingdom) Bart Harrison																			15	30†	18	0
38	(Czech Republic) Jan Koller	32	20	24	Ret	34†	19							26	25	15				32	Ret	23	0
39	(Italy) Mattia Marchiante																			28	15	20	0
40	(Australia) Kamal Mrad	26	30†	Ret	Ret	17	28†	23	23	28	21	22	20	25	16	18							0
41	(United States) Hudson Schwartz																18	24	22	22	20	16	0
42	(Ukraine) Oleksandr Savinkov	33	28	21	Ret	21	Ret	18	24	29	30†	24	22	22	23	17	21	19	27	29	Ret	Ret	0
43	(Portugal) Francisco Macedo				18	24	Ret																0
44	(United States) Gabriel Holguin	34	24	29†	23	28	29†	25	30	30	29	23	25	28	Ret	19	23	26	26				0
45	(Australia) Dante Vinci																			26	27	19	0
46	(Brazil) Ciro Sobral																			20	24	28	0
47	(Austria) Oscar Wurz										25	21	Ret										0
48	(Romania) Andrei Dună	30	25	23	WD	WD	WD	WD	WD	WD										23	Ret	25	0
49	(United States) Lia Block																			30	23	Ret	0
50	(Slovakia) Matúš Ryba				Ret	25	25																0
51	(Saudi Arabia) Omar Aldereyaane										28	Ret	28										0
52	(Philippines) Bianca Bustamante																			33	Ret	Ret	0
Pos	Driver	R1	R2	R3	R1	R2	R3	R1	R2	R3	R1	R2	R3	R1	R2	R3	R1	R2	R3	R1	R2	R3	Pts
Pos	Driver	MIS (Italy)			IMO (Italy)			VLL (Italy)			MUG (Italy)			LEC (France)			CAT (Spain)			MNZ (Italy)			Pts

Colour	Result
Gold	Winner
Silver	Second place
Bronze	Third place
Green	Points classification
Blue	Non-points classification
Blue	Non-classified finish (NC)
Purple	Retired, not classified (Ret)
Red	Did not qualify (DNQ)
Red	Did not pre-qualify (DNPQ)
Black	Disqualified (DSQ)
White	Did not start (DNS)
White	Withdrew (WD)
White	Race cancelled (C)
Blank	Did not practice (DNP)
Blank	Did not arrive (DNA)
Blank	Excluded (EX)

**Bold** – Pole
Italics – Fastest Lap
† — Did not finish, but classified

=== Rookies' championship ===
Pos	Driver	MIS (Italy)			IMO (Italy)			VLL (Italy)			MUG (Italy)			LEC (France)			CAT (Spain)			MNZ (Italy)			Pts
Pos	Driver	R1	R2	R3	R1	R2	R3	R1	R2	R3	R1	R2	R3	R1	R2	R3	R1	R2	R3	R1	R2	R3	Pts
1	(United States) Alex Powell	1	1	1	Ret	17	2	7	1	1	1	1	2	1	2	15	1	2	3	19	7	1	343
2	(United Kingdom) Kean Nakamura-Berta	3	Ret	2	Ret	2	3	Ret	3	2	2	4	1	2	1	1	5	1	1	1	1	2	328
3	(Latvia) Tomass Štolcermanis	4	2	5	1	1	5	1	2	3	3	2	3	4	Ret	2	Ret	3	2	7	3	3	279
4	(Germany) Maxim Rehm	6	9	11	2	22†	1	15†	6	6	5	Ret	4	3	Ret	14	2	6	6	2	9	Ret	160
5	(Italy) Emanuele Olivieri	7	8	12	3	3	6	2	9	Ret	Ret	15	5	7	4	4	Ret	5	5	8	Ret	17†	132
6	(Italy) Maksimilian Popov	9	5	4	7	6	17	13†	4	5	7	3	8	9	Ret	5	4	4	11	Ret	6	13	129
7	(Serbia) Andrej Petrović	5	3	3	6	4	7	Ret	Ret	8	8	9	6										84
8	(Switzerland) Enea Frey	8	17†	Ret	Ret	8	9	11†	5	4	Ret	Ret	18†	Ret	3	3	14†	Ret	4	6	10	Ret	83
9	(United Kingdom) Edu Robinson	19†	11	7	9	9	12	5	14	14	12	6	16	13	9	6	Ret	7	7	Ret	2	9	70
10	(Finland) Luka Sammalisto	11	4	16†	4	19†	4	12†	Ret	11	WD	WD	WD				Ret	11	Ret	4	5	4	70
11	(Italy) Enzo Yeh	2	7	9	Ret	18	8	Ret	10	9	16†	7	9	8	5	17	6	Ret	10	18†	16	15	64
12	(Singapore) Kabir Anurag	15	12	Ret	Ret	11	11	14†	7	19†	6	Ret	7	5	8	16	3	Ret	Ret	3	15	14	64
13	(Romania) Luca Viișoreanu	14	15†	15†	12	12	14	3	15	12	4	8	12	6	11	8	9	10	8	16	12	16†	50
14	(Italy) Shimo Zhang	10	6	6	5	20†	10	Ret	8	7													38
15	(Serbia) Andrija Kostić	13	Ret	Ret	10	5	15	Ret	Ret	10	10	5	14	10	6	18	13	8	13				36
16	(Kyrgyzstan) Kirill Kutskov																			9	4	5	24
17	(Australia) Kamal Mrad	12	18†	Ret	Ret	7	18†	8	11	15	9	11	10	14	7	10							20
18	(Ukraine) Oleksandr Savinkov	17	16	8	Ret	10	Ret	6	12	16	15†	13	11	11	10	9	10	9	15	14	Ret	Ret	19
19	(Ukraine) Oleksandr Bondarev																8	13	9	5	Ret	11	16
20	(United States) Hudson Schwartz																7	12	12	10	13	6	15
21	(Brazil) Filippo Fiorentino							4	13	13	Ret	Ret	17	12	Ret	13							12
22	(Czech Republic) Jan Koller	16	10	10	Ret	21†	13							15	12	7				17	Ret	10	9
23	(Australia) Dante Vinci																			11	17	7	6
24	(Switzerland) Nathanaël Berreby	Ret	14	13	Ret	15	20†	9	17	18†	17†	14	19	17	Ret	12	11	Ret	16	12	8	12	6
25	(Italy) Mattia Marchiante																			13	11	8	4
26	(Portugal) Francisco Macedo				8	13	Ret																4
27	(United States) Gabriel Holguin	18	13	14†	11	16	19†	10	16	17	14	12	13	16	Ret	11	12	14	14				1
28	(Austria) Oscar Wurz										11	10	Ret										1
29	(Saudi Arabia) Omar Aldereyaane										13	Ret	15										0
30	(United States) Lia Block																			15	14	Ret	0
31	(Slovakia) Matúš Ryba				Ret	14	16																0
Pos	Driver	R1	R2	R3	R1	R2	R3	R1	R2	R3	R1	R2	R3	R1	R2	R3	R1	R2	R3	R1	R2	R3	Pts
Pos	Driver	MIS (Italy)			IMO (Italy)			VLL (Italy)			MUG (Italy)			LEC (France)			CAT (Spain)			MNZ (Italy)			Pts

=== Teams' championship ===
Each team acquired the points earned by their two best drivers in each race.

Pos	Team	MIS (Italy)			IMO (Italy)			VLL (Italy)			MUG (Italy)			LEC (France)			CAT (Spain)			MNZ (Italy)			Pts
Pos	Team	R1	R2	R3	R1	R2	R3	R1	R2	R3	R1	R2	R3	R1	R2	R3	R1	R2	R3	R1	R2	R3	Pts
1	(Italy) Prema Racing	1	1	1	3	3	1	1	1	1	1	1	1	4	1	1	1	1	3	1	1	2	763
1	(Italy) Prema Racing	2	2	2	5	4	4	4	2	2	5	3	5	5	6	3	4	4	4	3	2	3	763
2	(Germany) US Racing	3	3	6	2	2	2	2	5	4	2	2	2	1	2	24	2	3	1	2	3	1	542
2	(Germany) US Racing	4	12	11	4	22	3	5	7	5	3	8	6	2	3	25	5	5	2	4	4	5	542
3	(Netherlands) Van Amersfoort Racing	6	4	4	1	1	9	3	3	3	4	4	3	6	4	2	3	2	6	7	18	9	332
3	(Netherlands) Van Amersfoort Racing	16	22	10	7	7	22	6	10	10	8	5	4	19	5	8	15	6	7	12	20	15	332
4	(Switzerland) Jenzer Motorsport	12	6	7	13	8	14	22	6	13	9	7	18	11	10	4	12	13	10	13	14	6	68
4	(Switzerland) Jenzer Motorsport	13	9	15	Ret	11	15	26†	14	17	13	12	31†	20	14	5	14	20	19	15	17	18	68
5	(Germany) PHM AIX Racing	14	10	8	14	9	12	11	12	11	18	14	13	14	16	9	8	10	9	16	9	11	19
5	(Germany) PHM AIX Racing	17	13	12	15	12	18	16	13	15	20	20	14	18	17	10	13	16	21	21	11	21	19
6	(France) R-ace GP	7	11	22	12	31	7	27†	22	20	31†	18	19	17	13	30	17	23	20	10	8	12	17
6	(France) R-ace GP	25	15	31†	Ret	32†	13	Ret	Ret	22	WD	WD	WD				Ret	Ret	Ret	35†	26	30	17
7	(San Marino) AKM Motorsport	19	16	21	10	10	11	10	21	24	28	24	12	16	12	6	21	11	11	17	15	20	11
7	(San Marino) AKM Motorsport	33	28	26	21	21	23	17	24	29	30†	27	22	22	23	13	Ret	19	27	28	29	33†	11
8	(Switzerland) Maffi Racing	34	24	28	23	27	29†	24	30	30	29	23	25	28	Ret	19	22	26	26	19	7	13	6
8	(Switzerland) Maffi Racing	Ret	26	29†	Ret	28	32†	25	31	32†	32†	26	32	30	Ret	20	23	Ret	28	27	12	26	6
9	(Romania) Real Racing	28	25	23	24	23	21	13	29	23	11	19	24	15	24	16	20	21	17	23	16	25	0
9	(Romania) Real Racing	30	27†	30†	WD	WD	WD	WD	WD	WD										31	Ret	32†	0
10	(Italy) Cram Motorsport	Ret	18	Ret	18	24	Ret	14	26	25	Ret	Ret	30	23	20	12	Ret	22	23	25	Ret	17	0
10	(Italy) Cram Motorsport													31	Ret	23							0
11	(Slovenia) AS Motorsport	35†	21	20	19	19	17	15	28	26	27	17	26	24	22	14							0
11	(Slovenia) AS Motorsport										Ret	29†	29										0
12	(Italy) BVM Racing	32	20	24	Ret	34†	19							26	25	15				32	Ret	23	0
13	(France) ART Grand Prix																			30	23	Ret	0
13	(France) ART Grand Prix																			33	Ret	Ret	0
Pos	Team	R1	R2	R3	R1	R2	R3	R1	R2	R3	R1	R2	R3	R1	R2	R3	R1	R2	R3	R1	R2	R3	Pts
Pos	Team	MIS (Italy)			IMO (Italy)			VLL (Italy)			MUG (Italy)			LEC (France)			CAT (Spain)			MNZ (Italy)			Pts

Colour	Result
Gold	Winner
Silver	Second place
Bronze	Third place
Green	Points classification
Blue	Non-points classification
Blue	Non-classified finish (NC)
Purple	Retired, not classified (Ret)
Red	Did not qualify (DNQ)
Red	Did not pre-qualify (DNPQ)
Black	Disqualified (DSQ)
White	Did not start (DNS)
White	Withdrew (WD)
White	Race cancelled (C)
Blank	Did not practice (DNP)
Blank	Did not arrive (DNA)
Blank	Excluded (EX)

**Bold** – Pole
Italics – Fastest Lap
† — Did not finish, but classified

== See also ==
- 2024 Euro 4 Championship
