= Tymek Kucharczyk =

Polish racing driver (born 2006)

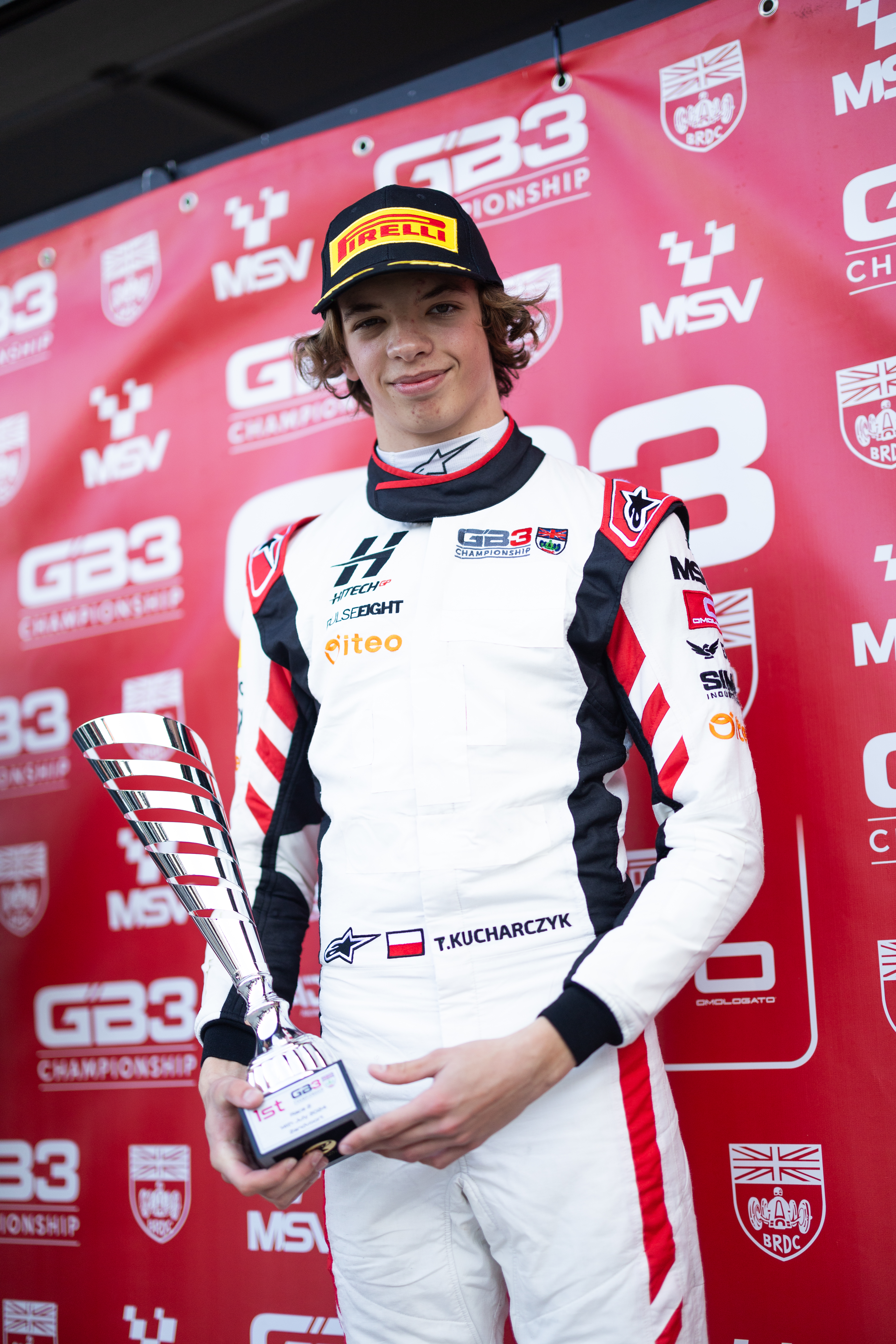
- Kucharczyk in 2024
- Nationality: (Poland) Polish
- Born: Tymoteusz Antoni Kucharczyk; 27 February 2006 (age 20) Łodygowice, Poland

Indy NXT career
- Debut season: 2026
- Current team: HMD Motorsports
- Starts: 17
- Wins: 2
- Podiums: 8
- Poles: 1
- Fastest laps: 2
- Best finish: 3rd in 2026

Previous series
- 2025 2023-2024 2023 2022: Euroformula Open Championship; GB3 Championship; FR European; F4 Spanish Championship

Championship titles
- 2025: Euroformula Open Championship

Tymoteusz Antoni "Tymek" Kucharczyk (born 27 February 2006) is a Polish racing driver who last competed in the 2026 Indy NXT with HMD Motorsports. Previously, he competed in the 2025 Euroformula Open Championship, where he won the title, and the 2024 GB3 Championship, where he finished third overall. He made his car racing debut in the 2022 F4 Spanish Championship with MP Motorsport, in which he also finished in third.

== Career ==
=== Karting (2011–2021) ===
Kucharczyk began karting at the age of five and began regularly taking part in races in Italy at the age of eight. In 2020, he joined Akademia ORLEN Team.

=== Formula 4 (2022) ===
In October 2021, Kucharczyk won Richard Mille Young Talent Academy shootout and earned a seat in F4 Spanish Championship with MP Motorsport.

On 30 April 2022, Kucharczyk made his Formula 4 debut at the Algarve International Circuit. He finished the season with a win and twelve podiums and came third in the drivers' championship.

=== Formula Regional (2023–2026) ===
==== 2023 ====
Kucharczyk would make his debut in GB3 with Douglas Motorsport for the 2023 season. He would finish the season in seventh.

On September 12, 2023, it was announced that Kucharczyk would debut in 2023 Formula Regional European Championship at Monza with the Saintéloc Racing team.

==== 2024 ====
For the 2024 season, Kucharczyk would switch to Hitech Pulse-Eight. He would have a much more impressive season during his second year, achieving four race wins and finishing third overall.

==== 2025 ====
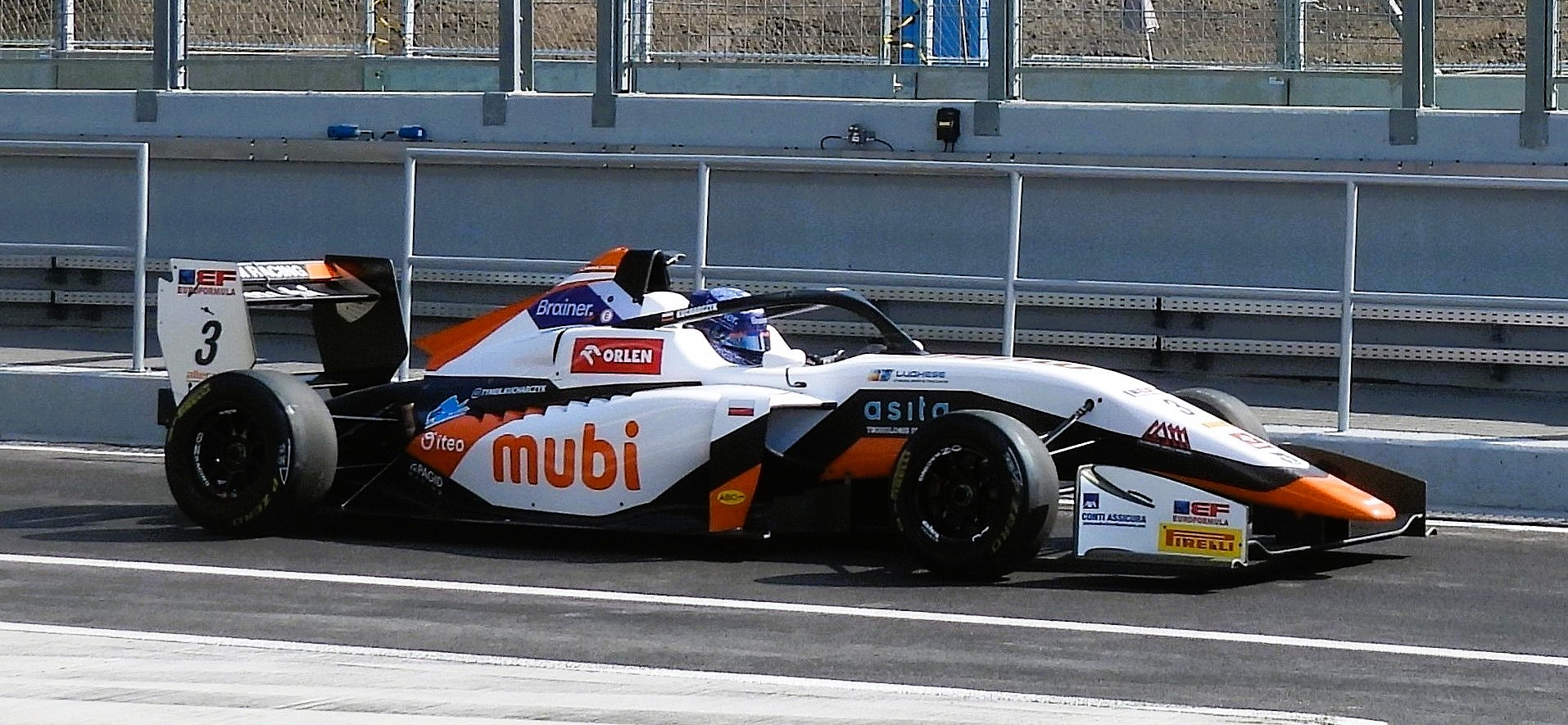
Tymek Kucharczyk driving for BVM Racing during the Euroformula Open at Hungaroring 2025

Kucharczyk competed in the Euroformula Open Championship with BVM Racing for the 2025 season. He secured the title in the second race at Monza, narrowly beating Yevan David by one thousandth of a second and finishing seven tenths ahead of Everett Stack.

==== 2026 ====
At the end of November, Kucharczyk returned to the Macau Grand Prix with Trident.

=== Indy NXT (2026) ===
On 14 January 2026, it was announced that Kucharczyk will compete in the Indy NXT with HMD Motorsports for the 2026 season.

== Personal life ==
Kucharczyk was born in Łodygowice in 2006. He named Ayrton Senna his racing hero.

== Karting record ==
=== Karting career summary ===
Season	Series	Team	Position
2011	Czech Championship — Easy 50	Hawi Racing Team	NC
2012	Czech Championship — Easy 50	Hawi Racing Team	3rd
2013	Karting Cup — Baby 60		6th
2013	Rotax Max Challenge Poland — Micro Max	UniQ Racing	6th
2013	CEE Rotax Max Challenge — Micro Max		
2014	CEE Rotax Max Challenge — Micro Max		
2014	Academy Champion Kart — Baby Academy	RB Racing	2nd
2014	Academy Champion Kart International Final — Baby Academy	RB Racing	3rd
2015	WSK Super Master Series — 60 Mini	RB Racing	32nd
2015	WSK Night Edition — 60 Mini	RB Racing	17th
2015	WSK Gold Cup — 60 Mini	RB Racing	NC
2015	WSK Final Cup — 60 Mini	RB Racing	NC
2016	WSK Champions Cup — 60 Mini	RB Racing	3rd
2016	WSK Super Master Series — 60 Mini	RB Racing	NC
2016	Trofeo d’Autunno — Mini ROK	Tb Kart Srl	2nd
2016	ROK Cup Italy Nord Region — Mini ROK		8th
2016	ROK Cup International Final — Mini ROK	Tb Kart Srl	18th
2017	WSK Champions Cup — 60 Mini	TK Kart Srl	14th
2017	WSK Super Master Series — 60 Mini	TK Kart Srl	25th
2017	Italian Championship — 60 Mini	TK Kart Srl	12th
2017	Trofeo d’Autunno — Mini ROK	TK Kart Srl	2nd
2017	ROK Cup Italy Nord Region — Mini ROK	TK Kart Srl	1st
2017	ROK Cup Italy — Mini ROK	TK Kart Srl	2nd
2017	ROK Cup International Final — Mini ROK	TK Kart Srl	14th
2017	WSK Final Cup — 60 Mini	Parolin Racing Team	24th
2018	WSK Champions Cup — 60 Mini	AV Racing	9th
2018	WSK Super Master Series — 60 Mini	AV Racing	2nd
2018	Italian Championship — ROK Junior		5th
2018	SKUSA SuperNationals XXII — X30 Junior class		6th
2018	CIK-FIA European Championship — OKJ	Baby Race Srl	41st
2018	CIK-FIA World Championship — OKJ	Baby Race Driver Academy	NC
2018	WSK Open Cup — OKJ		NC
2018	WSK Final Cup — OKJ	Baby Race Driver Academy	5th
2019	WSK Champions Cup — OKJ	Baby Race Driver Academy	34th
2019	South Garda Winter Cup — OKJ	Baby Race Driver Academy	33rd
2019	WSK Super Master Series — OKJ	Baby Race Driver Academy	20th
2019	WSK Euro Series — OKJ	Baby Race Driver Academy	18th
2019	Coupe de France — OKJ	Baby Race Driver Academy	7th
2019	Italian Championship — X30 Junior	Baby Race Driver Academy	12th
2019	CIK-FIA European Championship — OKJ	Baby Race Driver Academy	11th
2019	CIK-FIA World Championship — OKJ	Baby Race Driver Academy	NC
2019	WSK Open Cup — OKJ	Parolin Racing Kart	15th
2019	WSK Final Cup — OKJ	Parolin Racing Kart	3rd
2020	WSK Champions Cup — OKJ	Birel ART Racing	NC
2020	South Garda Winter Cup — OKJ	Birel ART Racing	4th
2020	WSK Super Master Series — OKJ	Birel ART Racing	6th
2020	CIK-FIA European Championship — OKJ	Birel ART Racing	12th
2020	WSK Euro Series — OKJ	Birel ART Racing	13th
2020	Champions of the Future — OKJ	Birel ART Racing	5th
2020	CIK-FIA World Championship — OKJ	Birel ART Racing	15th
2020	WSK Open Cup — OKJ	Birel ART Racing	5th
2021	WSK Champions Cup — OK	Birel ART Racing	14th
2021	WSK Super Master Series — OK	Birel ART Racing	6th
2021	WSK Euro Series — OK	Birel ART Racing	3rd
2021	Champions of the Future — OK	Birel ART Racing	7th
2021	CIK-FIA European Championship — OK	Birel ART Racing	24th
2021	CIK-FIA European Championship — KZ	Birel ART Racing	NC
2021	CIK-FIA World Championship — OK	Birel ART Racing	32nd
2021	WSK Open Cup — OK	Birel ART Racing	2nd

== Racing record ==
=== Racing career summary ===
Season	Series	Team	Races	Wins	Poles	F/Laps	Podiums	Points	Position
2022	F4 Spanish Championship	MP Motorsport	21	1	0	0	12	227	**3rd**
2023	GB3 Championship	Douglas Motorsport	23	0	0	2	2	296	7th
2023	Formula Regional European Championship	Saintéloc Racing	2	0	0	0	0	0	NC†
2024	GB3 Championship	Hitech Pulse-Eight	23	4	3	9	11	443	**3rd**
2025	Euroformula Open Championship	BVM Racing	24	6	5	9	14	362	**1st**
2025	Macau Grand Prix	Van Amersfoort Racing	1	0	0	0	0	—N/a	13th
2026	Indy NXT	HMD Motorsports	17	2	1	2	8	551	**3rd**
2026	USF Pro 2000 Championship	TJ Speed Motorsports	1	0	0	0	1	33	23rd
2026	Macau Grand Prix	Trident	0	0	0	0	0	—N/a	TBD

^{*} Season still in progress.

=== Complete F4 Spanish Championship results ===
(key) (Races in bold indicate pole position) (Races in italics indicate fastest lap)

Year	Team	1	2	3	4	5	6	7	8	9	10	11	12	13	14	15	16	17	18	19	20	21	DC	Points
2022	MP Motorsport	ALG; 1; 3	ALG; 2; 2	ALG; 3; 3	JER; 1; 1	JER; 2; 2	JER; 3; 24	CRT; 1; 3	CRT; 2; 14	CRT; 3; 2	SPA; 1 Ret	SPA; 2; 16	SPA; 3; 8	ARA; 1; 5	ARA; 2; 2	ARA; 3; 2	NAV; 1; 4	NAV; 2; 4	NAV; 3; 2	CAT; 1; 3	CAT; 2; 3	CAT; 3; 6	3rd	227

=== Complete GB3 Championship results ===
(key) (Races in bold indicate pole position) (Races in italics indicate fastest lap)

Year	Team	1	2	3	4	5	6	7	8	9	10	11	12	13	14	15	16	17	18	19	20	21	22	23	24	DC	Points
2023	Douglas Motorsport	OUL; 1; 5	OUL; 2; 8	OUL; 3; 13^{7}	SIL1; 1; 14	SIL1; 2; 9	SIL1; 3; 8^{15}	SPA; 1; 3	SPA; 2; 5	SPA; 3; 7^{15}	SNE; 1; 5	SNE; 2 DSQ	SNE; 3 Ret	SIL2; 1; 4	SIL2; 2; 3	SIL2; 3 C	BRH; 1; 5	BRH; 2; 7	BRH; 3 Ret	ZAN; 1; 12	ZAN; 2; 10	ZAN; 3; 18	DON; 1; 9	DON; 2; 7	DON; 3 Ret	7th	296
2024	Hitech Pulse-Eight	OUL; 1; 6	OUL; 2 Ret	OUL; 3; 4^{3}	**SIL1**; **1**; 1	**SIL1**; **2**; 3	SIL1; 3 C	**SPA**; **1**; 1	SPA; 2; 1	SPA; 3; 4^{8}	HUN; 1; 2	HUN; 2 DSQ	HUN; 3; 17	ZAN; 1; 2	ZAN; 2; 1	ZAN; 3; 9^{2}	SIL2; 1 Ret	SIL2; 2; 5	SIL2; 3; 3^{4}	DON; 1; 4	DON; 2; 2	DON; 3; 7^{4}	BRH; 1; 3	BRH; 2; 3	BRH; 3; 8^{1}	3rd	443

^{*} Season still in progress.

=== Complete Formula Regional European Championship results ===
(key) (Races in bold indicate pole position) (Races in italics indicate fastest lap)

Year	Team	1	2	3	4	5	6	7	8	9	10	11	12	13	14	15	16	17	18	19	20	DC	Points
2023	Saintéloc Racing	IMO; 1	IMO; 2	CAT; 1	CAT; 2	HUN; 1	HUN; 2	SPA; 1	SPA; 2	MUG; 1	MUG; 2	LEC; 1	LEC; 2	RBR; 1	RBR; 2	MNZ; 1; 17	MNZ; 2; 20	ZAN; 1	ZAN; 2	HOC; 1	HOC; 2	NC†	0

^{†} As Kucharczyk was a guest driver, he was ineligible to score points.

=== Complete Euroformula Open Championship results ===
(key) (Races in bold indicate pole position) (Races in italics indicate fastest lap)

Year	Team	1	2	3	4	5	6	7	8	9	10	11	12	13	14	15	16	17	18	19	20	21	22	23	24	Pos	Points
2025	BVM Racing	**PRT**; **1**; 8	PRT; 2; 4	PRT; 3; 3	SPA; 1; 2	SPA; 2; 1	SPA; 3; 1	**HOC**; **1**; 8	HOC; 2; 4	HOC; 3; 4	**HUN**; **1**; 1	HUN; 2; 4	HUN; 3; 11	**LEC**; **1**; 1	LEC; 2; 3	LEC; 3; 2	**RBR**; **1**; 3	RBR; 2; 3	RBR; 3; 3	CAT; 1; 1	CAT; 2; 4	CAT; 3; 7	MNZ; 1; 3	MNZ; 2; 1	MNZ; 3; 7	1st	362

=== Complete Macau Grand Prix results ===
Year	Team	Car	Qualifying	Quali Race	Main Race
2025	(Netherlands) Van Amersfoort Racing	Tatuus F3 T-318	18th	24th	13th
2026	(Italy) Trident	Tatuus T-326	TBD	TBD	TBD

=== American open–wheel results ===
==== USF Pro 2000 Championship ====
(key) (Races in bold indicate pole position) (Races in italics indicate fastest lap) (Races with * indicate most race laps led)

Year	Team	1	2	3	4	5	6	7	8	9	10	11	12	13	14	15	16	17	18	Rank	Points
2026	TJ Speed Motorsports	ARL; 1	ARL; 2	IMS; 1	IMS; 2	IRP; 3	ROA; 1	ROA; 2	MOH; 1	MOH; 2	MOH; 3	POR; 1	POR; 2	MAR; 1	MAR; 2	MIL	ROA; 1	ROA; 2	ROA; 3	23rd	33

==== Indy NXT ====
(key) (Races in bold indicate pole position) (Races in italics indicate fastest lap) (Races with ^{L} indicate a race lap led) (Races with * indicate most race laps led)

Year	Team	1	2	3	4	5	6	7	8	9	10	11	12	13	14	15	16	17	Rank	Points
2026	HMD Motorsports	STP; 3	ARL; 3	BAR; 3	BAR; 5	IMS; 4	IMS; 1*	DET; 3*	GAT; 9	ROA; 8	ROA; 2	MOH; 2	MOH; 5	NSS; 18	POR; 4	MIL; 12	LAG; 10	LAG; 1*	3rd	551
