= Luca Viișoreanu =

Romanian racing driver (born 2009)

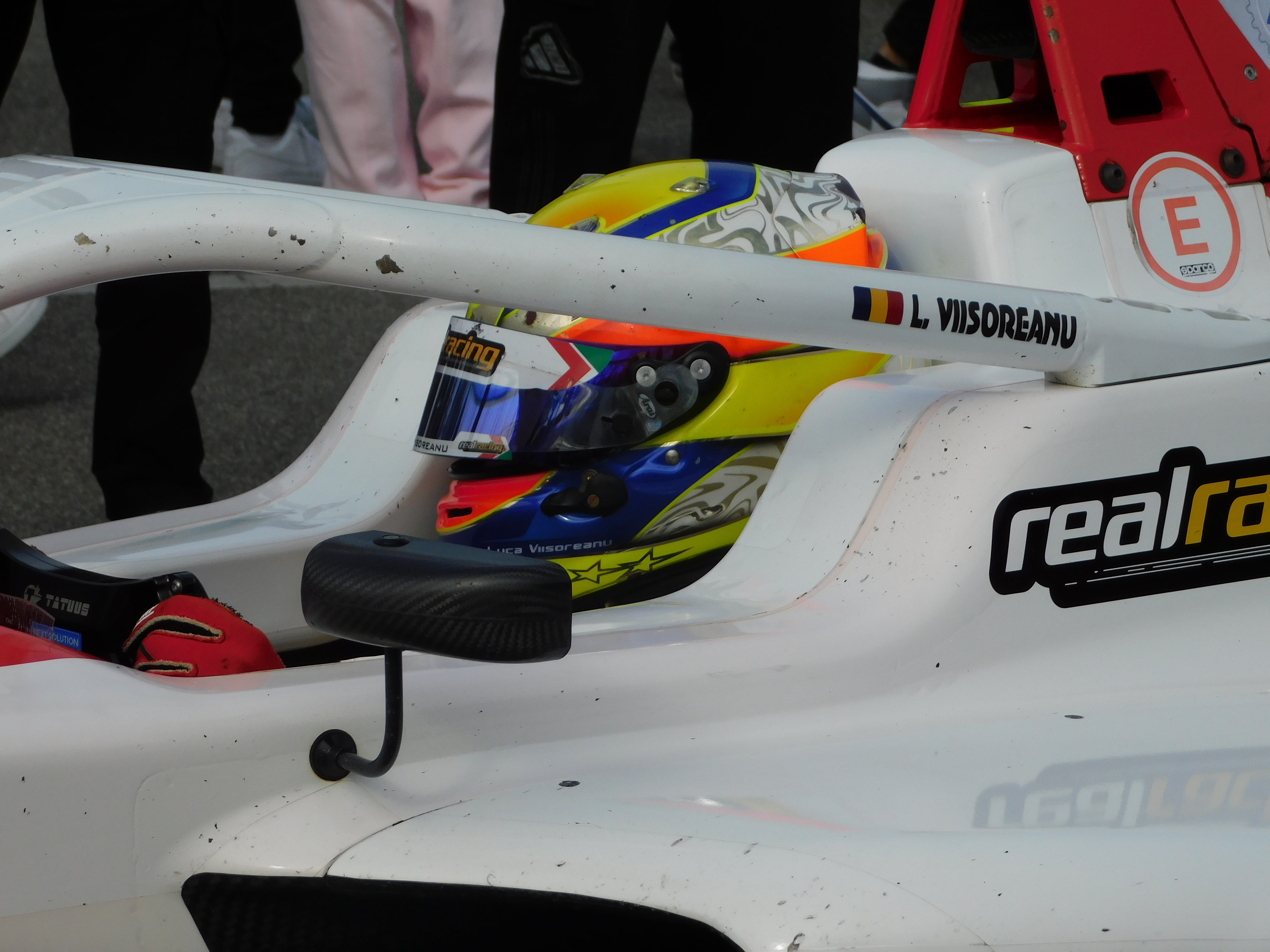
- Viișoreanu in 2024
- Nationality: (Romania) Romanian
- Born: Luca Paul Viișoreanu; 3 April 2009 (age 17) Romania

Eurocup-3 career
- Debut season: 2026
- Current team: TC Racing
- Car number: 11
- Starts: 3
- Wins: 0
- Podiums: 0
- Poles: 0
- Fastest laps: 0
- Best finish: 35th in 2026

Previous series
- 2026 2025 2024–2025 2024–2025 2024–2025: Eurocup-3 Spanish Winter; Euroformula Open; Euro 4 / E4; Italian F4; F4 CEZ

Luca Paul Viișoreanu (born 3 April 2009) is a Romanian racing driver who last competed in Eurocup-3 for TC Racing.

== Career ==
=== Karting ===
Viișoreanu made his competitive karting debut in 2018, winning the Romanian Karting Masters in the Mini ROK category. He won the title again in 2019 and began his partnership with Real Racing.

In 2021, Viișoreanu competed in the Romanian Karting Masters in the Junior ROK category, coming runner-up to the title. He also competed in 49° Trofeo delle Industrie and 32° Andrea Margutti Trophy in X30 Junior categories, placing 13th and 12th, respectively. Viișoreanu won the Romanian Karting Masters and the International Karting Masters in 2022.

=== Formula 4 ===
==== 2024 ====
Viișoreanu made his car racing and single-seater debut in the 2024 Italian F4 Championship, where he drove for Real Racing and was teammates with compatriot Andrei Dună. In his and the team's first year in single-seater racing, he only managed to achieve a highest finish of eleventh place at the first race of the fifth round at Mugello Circuit. He got his maiden rookie podium in the first race of the third round at Vallelunga Circuit. The Romanian finished the championship 29th in the standings.

Viișoreanu also raced in the 2024 Euro 4 Championship for the same team. In the three-round series, he scored three points finishes – all tenth places, two in the second round at the Red Bull Ring and one in the final race of the series at the Monza Circuit. He finished 22nd in the championship with three points.

Viișoreanu also drove in a one-off at the 2024 Formula 4 CEZ Championship with Real Racing at the Red Bull Ring, where he came sixth, ninth and fifth in the races, finishing 21st in the overall championship with 22 points.

==== 2025 ====
Viișoreanu kicked off his Formula 4 campaign with a cameo at the Red Bull Ring in the first round of the 2025 Formula 4 CEZ Championship with Real Racing, where he came fourth in the first race, retired in the second race and in the third race he won his first single-seater race after a gamble with slick tyres, he would also bag a fastest lap as well.

For his full-time campaign, Viișoreanu contested the 2025 Italian F4 Championship with Real Racing for a second year in a row alongside the same teammate, Andrei Dună.

At the first round in Misano World Circuit, he came 21st in the first race and retired from the second race. In the first of three four-race weekends of the season, Viișoreanu's best result in those two races was not able to qualify for the main race. The following round at Vallelunga followed the same format, but Viișoreanu was able to qualify for the third race and got his first points in the series with a ninth place in race three.

From Monza Circuit onwards, the series returned to the three-race format. Viișoreanu came twelfth in the first race, fourteenth in the second race and a career-best fourth in the third race. The next round at Mugello bore no points for him and neither did the first round of the 2025 E4 Championship at Circuit Paul Ricard where he came a highest of twelfth in the second race after a retirement in the first race. After another difficult round in Italian F4 at Imola Circuit, he announced his departure from Real Racing and would not continue the rest of the season with them.

Viișoreanu returned to Italian F4 Championship with R-ace GP ahead of the sixth round of the season at Circuit de Barcelona-Catalunya.

=== Euroformula Open ===
Instead of continuing Italian F4, Viișoreanu moved up to the 2025 Euroformula Open Championship with Motopark Academy at the Red Bull Ring. In his debut race he came in ninth after a first lap tangle with debutant Ricardo Baptista, he also came ninth in the second race and improved with a seventh place in the third race.

Viișoreanu competed for Nielsen Racing in the final round of the championship at Monza Circuit and recorded his highest finish in the series with a sixth place at the second race and ended the championship in eighteenth with eighteen points.

=== Eurocup 3 ===
In 2026, Viișoreanu signed to compete in the Eurocup-3 for TC Racing.

== Karting record ==
=== Karting career summary ===
Season	Series	Team	Position
2018	WSK Super Master Series - 60 Mini	Praga Junior Team	113th
2018	WSK Open Cup - 60 Mini	Maranello Kart	72nd
2018	Romanian Karting Masters - Mini ROK		1st
2019	WSK Euro Series - 60 Mini	Real Racing	112nd
2019	Romanian Karting Masters - Mini ROK	Real Racing	1st
2020	WSK Super Master Series - 60 Mini	Real Racing	120th
2020	25° South Garda Winter Cup - Mini ROK	Real Racing	49th
2020	Romanian Cup		3rd
2021	Romanian Karting Masters - Junior ROK		2nd
2021	49° Trofeo delle Industrie - X30 Junior	Real Racing	13th
2021	Andrea Margutti Trophy - X30 Junior	A.C.S Real Racing	12th
2021	ROK Cup Superfinal - Junior ROK		
2022	Romanian Karting Masters - Junior ROK	Real Racing	1st
2022	International Karting Masters – Junior Rok	Real Racing	1st
2022	Trofeo ROK Cup – Junior Rok	Real Racing	9th
2022	Super Rok Cup – Junior Rok	Real Racing	36th
2022	Ayrton Senna Trophy – X30 Junior	Real Racing	12th
2022	IAME Series Italy – X30 Junior		12th

== Racing record ==
=== Racing career summary ===
Season	Series	Team	Races	Wins	Poles	F/Laps	Podiums	Points	Position
2024	Italian F4 Championship	Real Racing	21	0	0	0	0	0	29th
2024	Formula 4 CEZ Championship	Real Racing	3	0	0	0	0	22	21st
2024	Euro 4 Championship	Real Racing	9	0	0	0	0	3	22nd
2025	Formula 4 CEZ Championship	Real Racing	3	1	0	1	1	37	15th
2025	E4 Championship	Real Racing	3	0	0	0	0	0	24th
2025	Italian F4 Championship	Real Racing	13	0	0	0	0	14	24th
2025	Italian F4 Championship	R-ace GP	2	0	0	0	0	14	24th
2025	Euroformula Open Championship	Team Motopark	3	0	0	0	0	18	18th
2025	Euroformula Open Championship	Nielsen Racing	3	0	0	0	0	18	18th
2026	Eurocup-3 Spanish Winter Championship	TC Racing	9	0	0	0	0	1	20th
2026	Eurocup-3	TC Racing	5	0	0	0	0	0	35th

* Season still in progress.

=== Complete Italian F4 Championship results ===
(key) (Races in bold indicate pole position; races in italics indicate fastest lap)

Year	Team	1	2	3	4	5	6	7	8	9	10	11	12	13	14	15	16	17	18	19	20	21	22	23	24	25	DC	Points
2024	Real Racing	MIS; 1; 28	MIS; 2; 27†	MIS; 3; 30†	IMO; 1; 24	IMO; 2; 23	IMO; 3; 21	VLL; 1; 13	VLL; 2; 29	VLL; 3; 23	MUG; 1; 11	MUG; 2; 19	MUG; 3; 24	LEC; 1; 15	LEC; 2; 24	LEC; 3; 16	CAT; 1; 20	CAT; 2; 21	CAT; 3; 17	MNZ; 1; 31	MNZ; 2; 16	MNZ; 3; 32†					29th	0
2025	Real Racing	MIS1; 1; 21	MIS1; 2 Ret	MIS1; 3	MIS1; 4 DNQ	VLL; 1	VLL; 2; 17	VLL; 3; 9	VLL; 4; 21	MNZ; 1; 12	MNZ; 2; 14	MNZ; 3; 4	MUG; 1; 33†	MUG; 2 Ret	MUG; 3; 18	IMO; 1; 16	IMO; 2 C	IMO; 3; 17									24th	14
2025	R-ace GP																		CAT; 1; 32†	CAT; 2; 35†	CAT; 3 C	MIS2; 1	MIS2; 2	MIS2; 3	MIS2; 4	MIS2; 5	24th	14

=== Complete Formula 4 CEZ Championship results ===
(key) (Races in bold indicate pole position) (Races in italics indicate fastest lap)

Year	Team	1	2	3	4	5	6	7	8	9	10	11	12	13	14	15	16	17	18	DC	Points
2024	Real Racing	BAL; 1	BAL; 2	BAL; 3	RBR; 1; 6	RBR; 2; 9	RBR; 3; 5	SVK; 1	SVK; 2	SVK; 3	MOS; 1	MOS; 2	MOS; 3	BRN; 1	BRN; 2	BRN; 3	SAL; 1	SAL; 2	SAL; 3	21st	22
2025	Real Racing	RBR1; 1; 4	RBR1; 2 Ret	RBR1; 3; 1	RBR2; 1	RBR2; 2	RBR2; 3	SAL; 1	SAL; 2	SAL; 3	MOS; 1	MOS; 2	MOS; 3	SVK; 1	SVK; 2	SVK; 3	BRN; 1	BRN; 2	BRN; 3	15th	37

=== Complete Euro 4/E4 Championship results ===
(key) (Races in bold indicate pole position; races in italics indicate fastest lap)

Year	Team	1	2	3	4	5	6	7	8	9	DC	Points
2024	Real Racing	MUG; 1; 16	MUG; 2; 24	MUG; 3; 18	RBR; 1; 10	RBR; 2; 23	RBR; 3; 10	MNZ; 1 Ret	MNZ; 2; 20	MNZ; 3; 10	22nd	3
2025	Real Racing	LEC; 1 Ret	LEC; 2; 12	LEC; 3; 17	MUG; 1	MUG; 2	MUG; 3	MNZ; 1	MNZ; 2	MNZ; 3	24th	0

=== Complete Euroformula Open Championship results ===
(key) (Races in bold indicate pole position) (Races in italics indicate fastest lap)

Year	Entrant	1	2	3	4	5	6	7	8	9	10	11	12	13	14	15	16	17	18	19	20	21	22	23	24	DC	Points
2025	Team Motopark	PRT; 1	PRT; 2	PRT; 3	SPA; 1	SPA; 2	SPA; 3	HOC; 1	HOC; 2	HOC; 3	HUN; 1	HUN; 2	HUN; 3	LEC; 1	LEC; 2	LEC; 3	RBR; 1; 9	RBR; 2; 9	RBR; 3; 7	CAT; 1	CAT; 2	CAT; 3				18th	18
2025	Nielsen Racing																						MNZ; 1 Ret	MNZ; 2; 6	MNZ; 3; 11	18th	18

=== Complete Eurocup-3 Spanish Winter Championship results ===
(key) (Races in bold indicate pole position) (Races in italics indicate fastest lap)

Year	Team	1	2	3	4	5	6	7	8	9	DC	Points
2026	TC Racing	POR; 1; 21	POR; SPR; 21	POR; 2; 17	JAR; 1; 22†	JAR; SPR; 13	JAR; 2; 16	ARA; 1; 11	ARA; SPR; 14	ARA; 2; 10	20th	1

=== Complete Eurocup-3 results ===
(key) (Races in bold indicate pole position; races in italics indicate fastest lap)

Year	Team	1	2	3	4	5	6	7	8	9	10	11	12	13	14	15	16	17	18	19	DC	Points
2026	TC Racing	LEC; 1; 19	LEC; SR; 25	LEC; 2; 15	POR; 1; 25	POR; 2 Ret	IMO; 1	IMO; SR	IMO; 2	MNZ; 1	MNZ; 2	SIL; 1	SIL; 2	JER; 1	JER; SR	JER; 2	HUN; 1	HUN; 2	CAT; 1	CAT; 2	35th	0
