= Łodygowice =

- Village
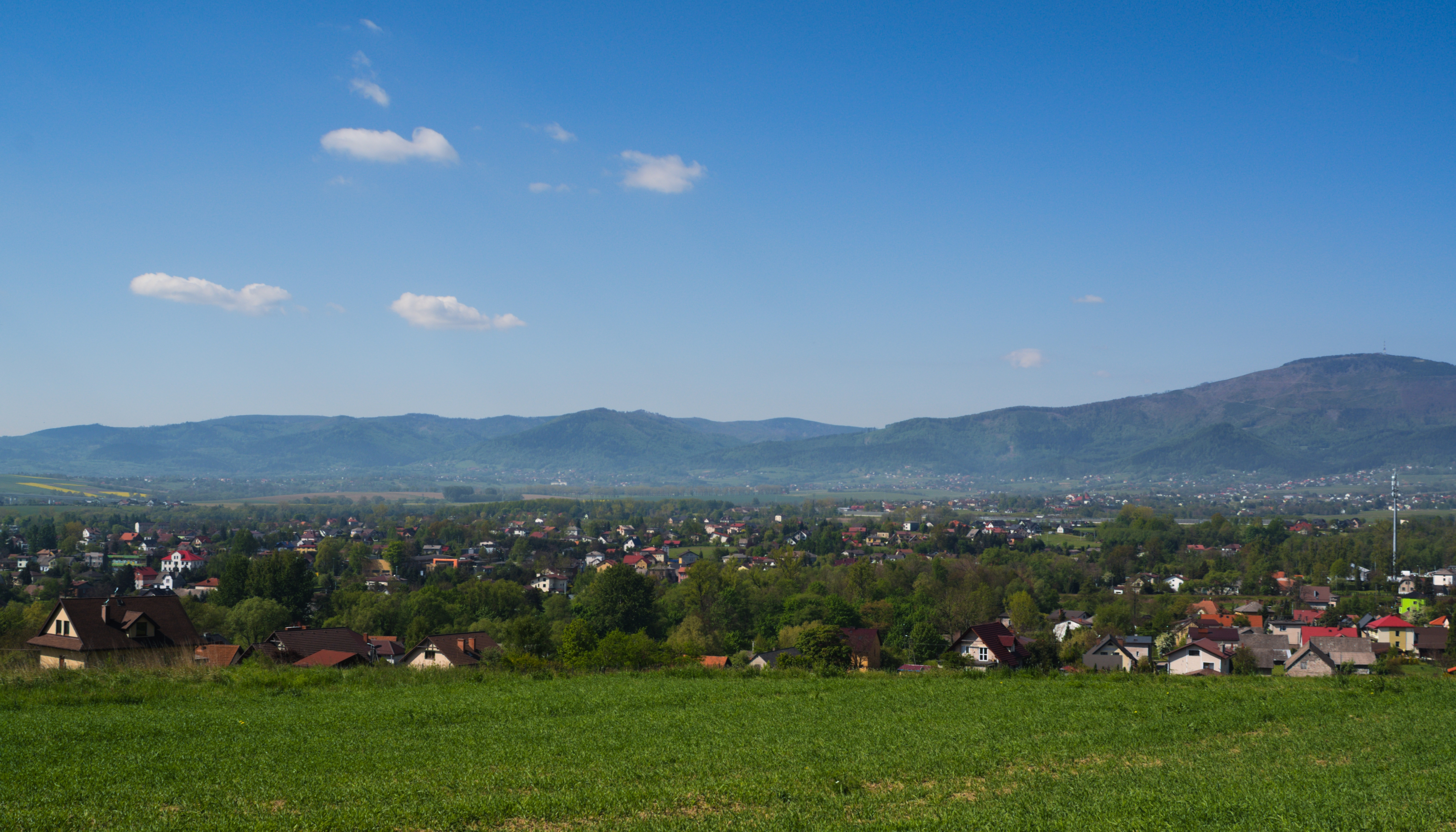
- View of Łodygowice

- Coat of arms

- Location within Poland
- Coordinates: 49°43′N 19°8′E
- Country: Poland
- Voivodeship: Silesian
- County: Żywiec
- Gmina: Łodygowice
- Established: 13th century
- Elevation: 370 m (1,210 ft)
- Population: 6,925
- Website: http://www.lodygowice.com.pl/

Łodygowice [wɔdɨɡɔˈvit͡sɛ] is a village in Żywiec County, Silesian Voivodeship, in southern Poland. It is the seat of the gmina (administrative district) called Gmina Łodygowice.

It is one of the oldest villages in Żywiec Basin. It was established in the 13th century, and in the early 14th century belonged to the Cistercian monastery in Rudy.

== Notable people ==
- Wojciech Kania, Polish military officer
- Tymoteusz Kucharczyk, Polish racing driver
