= Davide Larini =

Italian racing driver (born 2007)

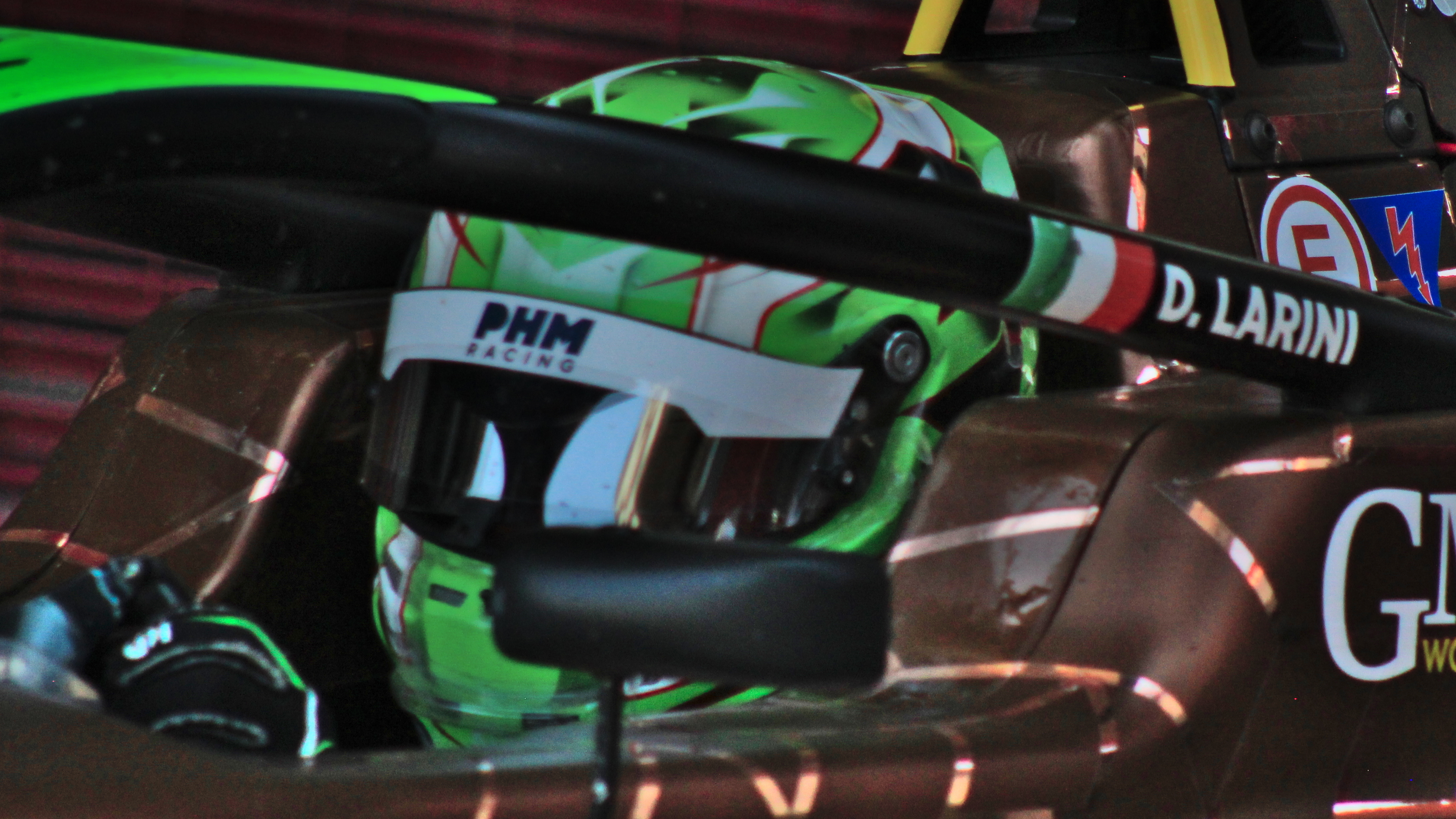
- Larini in 2024
- Nationality: (Italy) Italian
- Full name: Davide Larini
- Born: 17 October 2007 (age 19) Pisa, Italy
- Relatives: Nicola Larini (father)

GT Cup Open Europe career
- Debut season: 2025
- Current team: Burgers Motorsport
- Car number: 83
- Former teams: Mertel Motorsport
- Starts: 4
- Wins: 1
- Podiums: 2
- Poles: 0
- Fastest laps: 0
- Best finish: 9th in 2025

Previous series
- 2025 2024 2024 2024 2023–2024 2023–2024: Formula Winter Series; Formula Trophy UAE; Formula 4 CEZ Championship; Formula 4 UAE; Euro 4 Championship; Italian F4 Championship

Davide Larini (born 17 October 2007) is an Italian racing driver who last competed in the Italian GT Championship with A2 Motorsport. He previously competed in the 2024 Italian F4 Championship with PHM AIX Racing.

Larini is the son of former Formula One driver Nicola Larini.

== Early career ==
=== Karting ===
Larini started karting competitively in 2019, most notably clinching third place during the ROK Winter Trophy in 2022 in the Senior ROK category.

=== Formula 4 ===
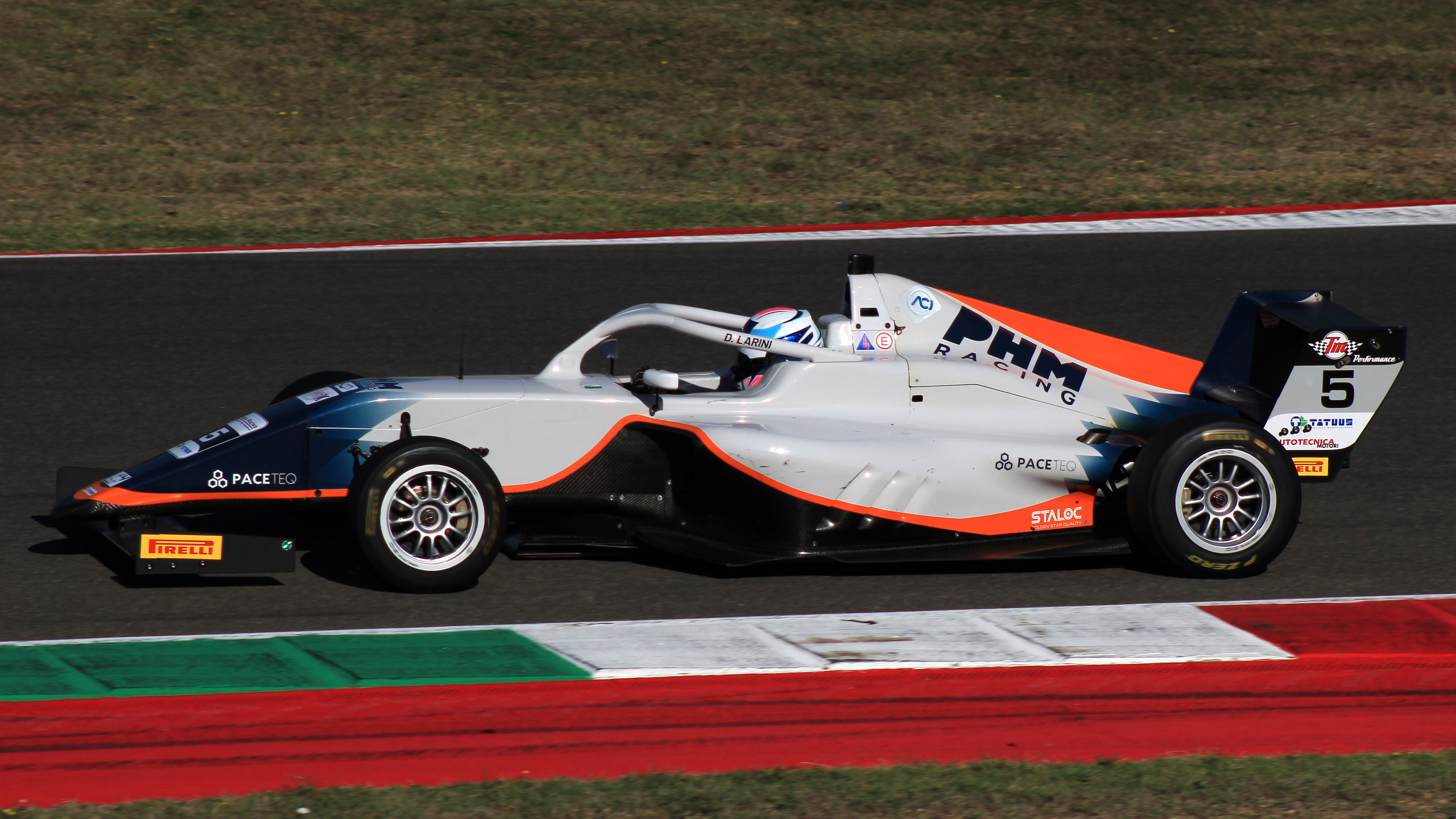
Larini driving at the Mugello Circuit during the 2023 Italian F4 Championship

==== 2023 ====
Larini made his single-seater debut in 2023, competing in the Italian F4 Championship with AKM Motorsport. He failed to score points throughout the season and with a highest finish of 14th place, he placed 32nd in the standings. He also competed in the Euro 4 Championship with the same team, but also failed to score points and finished 29th in the standings.

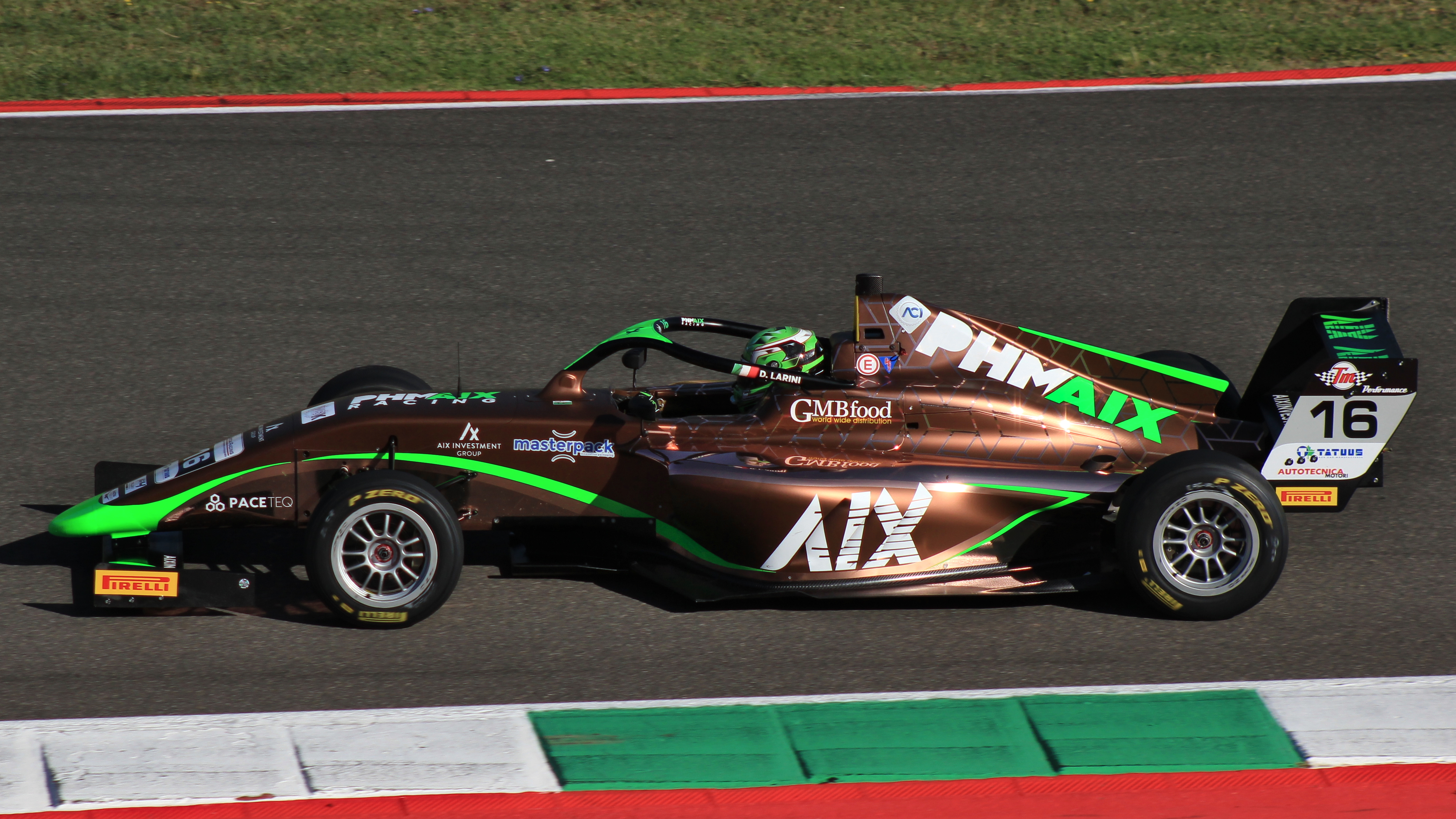
Larini driving at the Mugello Circuit during the 2024 Italian F4 Championship

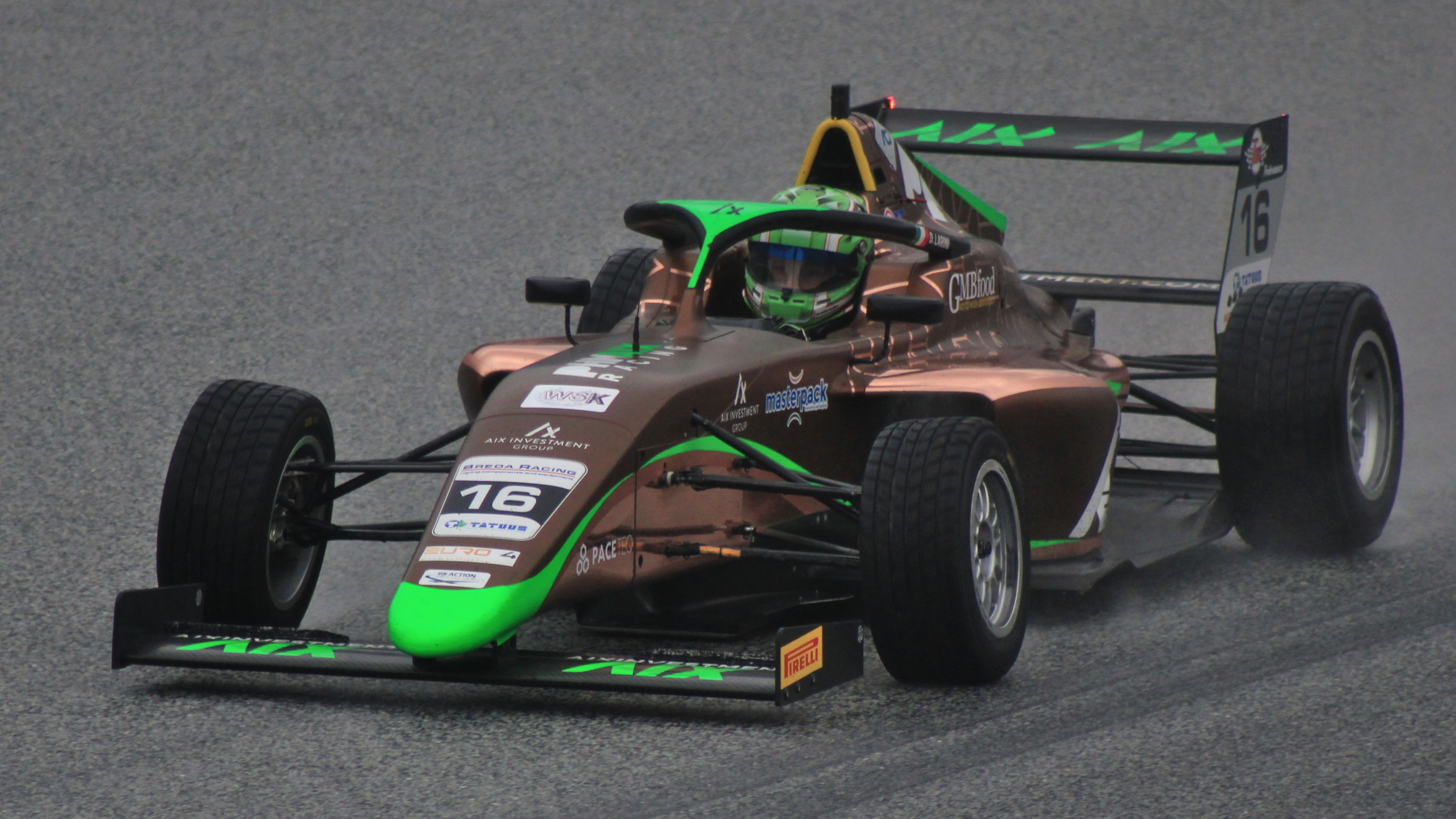
Larini driving at the Red Bull Ring during the 2024 Euro 4 Championship

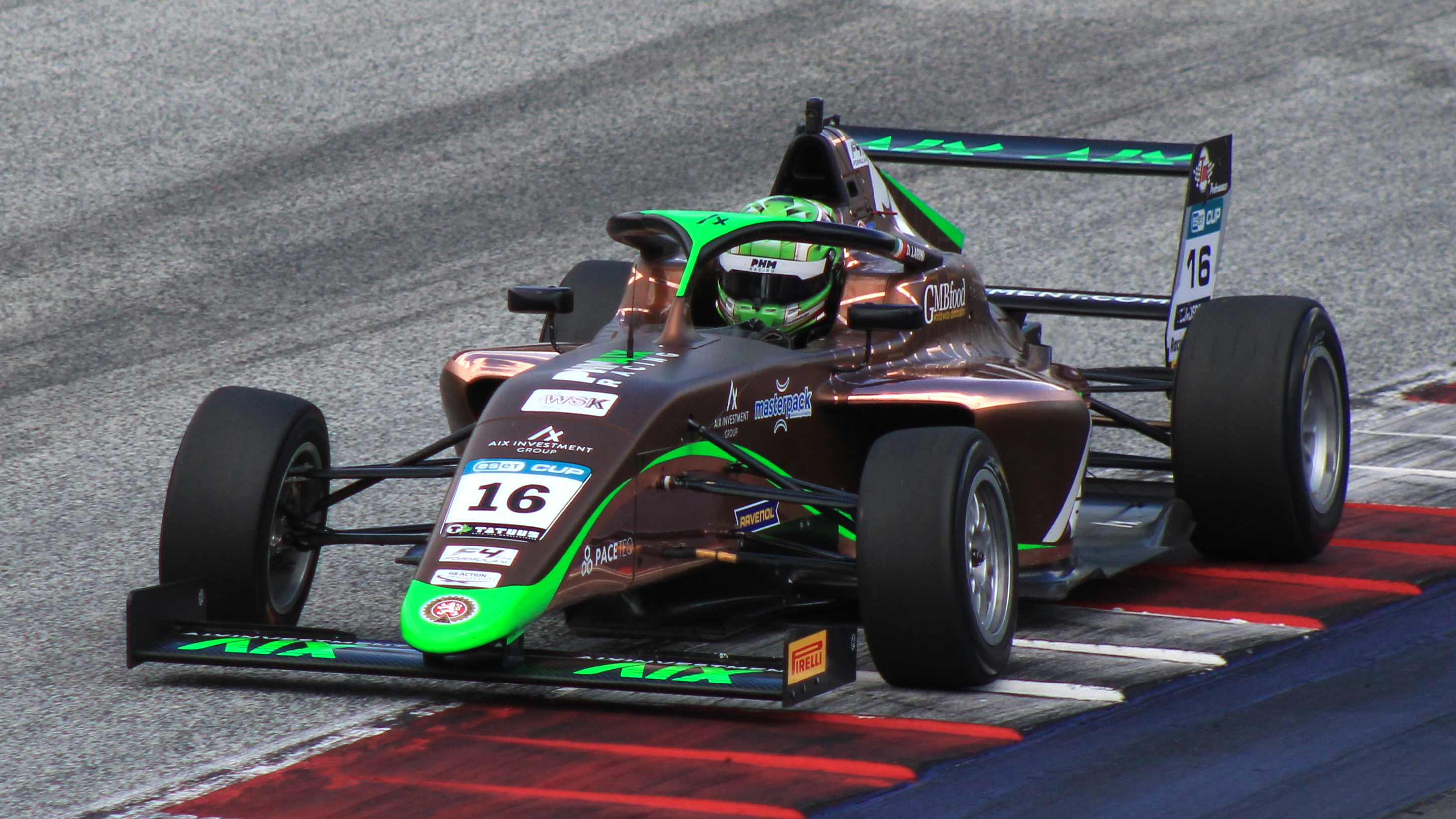
Larini racing at the Red Bull Ring during the 2024 Formula 4 CEZ Championship

==== 2024 ====
In the 2024 pre-season, Larini was signed by PHM AIX Racing to compete in the final two rounds of the Formula 4 UAE Championship. For his main campaign, Larini would remain with PHM AIX Racing to race in Italian F4. After scoring points in the opening Misano round with eighth place, Larini took two more ninth-place finishes and finished his sophomore Italian F4 season 22nd overall with eight points.

Larini also competed in Euro 4 with PHM AIX Racing. After two points finishes in the first two rounds, he took a surprise pole for the second race in Monza, although he eventually finished tenth. In the third race, Larini took his first podium with second place, propelling him to 12th in the standings. Larini also made a cameo appearance in Formula 4 CEZ at the Red Bull Ring, finishing on the podium in all three races. At the end of the season, Larini competed in the first round in Dubai of the Formula Trophy UAE with Pinnacle Motorsport.

==== 2025 ====
At the start of 2025, Larini competed in the final round of the Formula Winter Series with AKM Motorsport. With a highest finish of fifth and a further tenth place, he finished 16th in the standings with eleven points.

== Sportscar racing career ==
=== 2025 season: GT debut ===
Larini moved into sportscar racing for 2025, joining the GT Cup Open Europe with Mertel Motorsport alongside Matteo Luvisi.

== Personal life ==
Larini's father is former Formula One driver Nicola Larini, who competed in the sport between 1987 to 1997.

== Karting record ==
=== Karting career summary ===
Season	Series	Team	Position
2019	WSK Euro Series — 60 Mini	Newman Motorsport	NC
2019	ROK Cup Superfinal — Mini ROK	Newman Motorsport	35th
2019	WSK Final Cup — 60 Mini	Newman Motorsport	NC
2019	Italian Regional Championship Lombardia — 60 Mini		24th
2020	31° Andrea Margutti — X30 Junior	Newman Motorsport	22nd
2021	Italian ACI Karting Champ — X30 Junior		15th
2022	ROK Winter Trophy — Senior ROK	Zanchi Motorsport	3rd

== Racing record ==
=== Racing career summary ===
Season	Series	Team	Races	Wins	Poles	F/Laps	Podiums	Points	Position
2023	Italian F4 Championship	AKM Motorsport	9	0	0	0	0	0	32nd
2023	Italian F4 Championship	PHM Racing	6	0	0	0	0	0	32nd
2023	Euro 4 Championship	AKM Motorsport	6	0	0	0	0	0	29th
2024	Formula 4 UAE Championship	PHM AIX Racing	6	0	0	0	0	0	30th
2024	Italian F4 Championship	PHM AIX Racing	21	0	0	0	0	8	22nd
2024	Euro 4 Championship	PHM AIX Racing	9	0	1	1	1	29	12th
2024	Formula 4 CEZ Championship	PHM AIX Racing	3	0	0	0	3	51	9th
2024	Formula Trophy UAE	Pinnacle Motorsport	3	0	0	0	0	10	15th
2025	Formula Winter Series	AKM Motorsport	3	0	0	0	0	0	NC†
2025	GT Cup Open Europe	Mertel Motorsport	6	0	0	0	1	30	9th
2025	GT Cup Open Europe	Burgers Motorsport by Hans Weijs Motorsport	2	1	0	0	1	30	9th
2026	Italian GT Championship Sprint Cup - GT Cup	A2 Motorsport							

^{*} Season still in progress.

† As Larini was a guest driver, he was ineligible for points.

=== Complete Italian F4 Championship results ===
(key) (Races in bold indicate pole position) (Races in italics indicate fastest lap)

Year	Team	1	2	3	4	5	6	7	8	9	10	11	12	13	14	15	16	17	18	19	20	21	22	DC	Points
2023	AKM Motorsport	IMO; 1	IMO; 2; 17	IMO; 3; 17	IMO; 4; 25	MIS; 1; 14	MIS; 2 Ret	MIS; 3; 15	SPA; 1; 18	SPA; 2; 20	SPA; 3; 17	MNZ; 1 WD	MNZ; 2 WD	MNZ; 3 WD										32nd	0
2023	PHM Racing														LEC; 1	LEC; 2	LEC; 3	MUG; 1; 26	MUG; 2; 26	MUG; 3; 29	VLL; 1; 18	VLL; 2; 15	VLL; 3; 16	32nd	0
2024	PHM AIX Racing	MIS; 1; 14	MIS; 2 Ret	MIS; 3; 8	IMO; 1; 17	IMO; 2; 9	IMO; 3 Ret	VLL; 1; 11	VLL; 2; 12	VLL; 3; 11	MUG; 1; 24	MUG; 2 Ret	MUG; 3; 13	LEC; 1; 14	LEC; 2; 17	LEC; 3 Ret	CAT; 1; 13	CAT; 2; 16	CAT; 3; 9	MNZ; 1; 21	MNZ; 2; 11	MNZ; 3; 11		22nd	8

=== Complete Euro 4 Championship results ===
(key) (Races in bold indicate pole position; races in italics indicate fastest lap)

Year	Team	1	2	3	4	5	6	7	8	9	DC	Points
2023	AKM Motorsport	MUG; 1; 20	MUG; 2; 16	MUG; 3; 16	MNZ; 1; 17	MNZ; 2 Ret	MNZ; 3; 17	CAT; 1	CAT; 2	CAT; 3	29th	0
2024	PHM AIX Racing	MUG; 1; 15	MUG; 2; 9	MUG; 3; 13	RBR; 1; 6	RBR; 2; 14	RBR; 3; 24	MNZ; 1; 16	**MNZ**; **2**; 10	MNZ; 3; 2	12th	29

=== Complete Formula 4 UAE Championship results ===
(key) (Races in bold indicate pole position) (Races in italics indicate fastest lap)

Year	Team	1	2	3	4	5	6	7	8	9	10	11	12	13	14	15	Pos	Points
2024	PHM AIX Racing	YMC1; 1	YMC1; 2	YMC1; 3	YMC2; 1	YMC2; 2	YMC2; 3	DUB1; 1	DUB1; 2	DUB1; 3	YMC3; 1; 19	YMC3; 2; 20	YMC3; 3; 17	DUB2; 1; 16	DUB2; 2; 17	DUB2; 3; 28	30th	0

=== Complete Formula 4 CEZ Championship results ===
(key) (Races in bold indicate pole position) (Races in italics indicate fastest lap)

Year	Team	1	2	3	4	5	6	7	8	9	10	11	12	13	14	15	16	17	18	DC	Points
2024	PHM AIX Racing	BAL; 1	BAL; 2	BAL; 3	RBR; 1; 2	RBR; 2; 2	RBR; 3; 3	SVK; 1	SVK; 2	SVK; 3	MOS; 1	MOS; 2	MOS; 3	BRN; 1	BRN; 2	BRN; 3	SAL; 1	SAL; 2	SAL; 3	9th	51

=== Complete Formula Trophy UAE results ===
(key) (Races in bold indicate pole position; races in italics indicate fastest lap)

Year	Team	1	2	3	4	5	6	7	DC	Points
2024	Pinnacle Motorsport	DUB; 1; 20†	DUB; 2; 9	DUB; 3; 6	YMC1; 1	YMC1; 2	YMC2; 1	YMC2; 2	16th	10

=== Complete Formula Winter Series results ===
(key) (Races in bold indicate pole position) (Races in italics indicate fastest lap)

Year	Team	1	2	3	4	5	6	7	8	9	10	11	12	DC	Points
2025	AKM Motorsport	POR; 1	POR; 2	POR; 3	CRT; 1	CRT; 2	CRT; 3	ARA; 1	ARA; 2	ARA; 3	CAT; 1; 5	CAT; 2; 24	CAT; 3; 10	NC†	0

† As Larini was a guest driver, he was ineligible for points.
