= 2025 GT Cup Open Europe =

Sports car racing competition

The 2025 GT Cup Open Europe was the seventh season of the GT Cup Open Europe, the grand tourer-style sports car racing series founded by the Spanish GT Sport Organización. It began on 27 April at the Algarve International Circuit and finished at the Autodromo Nazionale di Monza on 19 October after six rounds.

== Calendar ==
The calendar was announced on 11 July 2024.

| Round | | Circuit | Date | Support bill | Map of circuit locations |
|---|---|---|---|---|---|
| 1 | R1 | (Portugal) Algarve International Circuit, Portimão | 26–27 April | International GT Open; Euroformula Open Championship; TCR Europe Touring Car Series | 2025 GT Cup Open Europe is located in Europe |
| 1 | R2 | (Portugal) Algarve International Circuit, Portimão | 26–27 April | International GT Open; Euroformula Open Championship; TCR Europe Touring Car Series | 2025 GT Cup Open Europe is located in Europe |
| 2 | R1 | (Belgium) Circuit de Spa-Francorchamps, Stavelot | 17–18 May | International GT Open; Formula Regional European Championship; Euroformula Open Championship; TCR Europe Touring Car Series | 2025 GT Cup Open Europe is located in Europe |
| 2 | R2 | (Belgium) Circuit de Spa-Francorchamps, Stavelot | 17–18 May | International GT Open; Formula Regional European Championship; Euroformula Open Championship; TCR Europe Touring Car Series | 2025 GT Cup Open Europe is located in Europe |
| 3 | R1 | (Germany) Hockenheimring, Hockenheim | 7–8 June | International GT Open; Euroformula Open Championship; TCR Europe Touring Car Series | 2025 GT Cup Open Europe is located in Europe |
| 3 | R2 | (Germany) Hockenheimring, Hockenheim | 7–8 June | International GT Open; Euroformula Open Championship; TCR Europe Touring Car Series | 2025 GT Cup Open Europe is located in Europe |
| 4 | R1 | (France) Circuit Paul Ricard, Le Castellet | 19–20 July | International GT Open; Formula Regional European Championship; Euroformula Open Championship; E4 Championship | 2025 GT Cup Open Europe is located in Europe |
| 4 | R2 | (France) Circuit Paul Ricard, Le Castellet | 19–20 July | International GT Open; Formula Regional European Championship; Euroformula Open Championship; E4 Championship | 2025 GT Cup Open Europe is located in Europe |
| 5 | R1 | (Spain) Circuit de Barcelona-Catalunya, Montmeló | 20–21 September | International GT Open; Formula Regional European Championship; Euroformula Open Championship; Italian F4 Championship | 2025 GT Cup Open Europe is located in Europe |
| 5 | R2 | (Spain) Circuit de Barcelona-Catalunya, Montmeló | 20–21 September | International GT Open; Formula Regional European Championship; Euroformula Open Championship; Italian F4 Championship | 2025 GT Cup Open Europe is located in Europe |
| 6 | | (Italy) Autodromo Nazionale di Monza, Monza | 18–19 October | International GT Open; Euroformula Open Championship; Renault Clio Cup Series; GB3 Championship | 2025 GT Cup Open Europe is located in Europe |

== Entry list ==
| Team | Car | No. | Drivers | Class | Rounds |
|---|---|---|---|---|---|
| (Germany) Mertel Motorsport | Ferrari 296 Challenge | 1 | (Germany) Antoine Berberich-Martini | S | 1–3 |
| (Germany) Mertel Motorsport | Ferrari 296 Challenge | 80 | (Italy) Luca Demarchi | S | 1–3 |
| (Germany) Mertel Motorsport | Ferrari 296 Challenge | 80 | (Italy) Simone Patrinicola | S | 1–3 |
| (Germany) Mertel Motorsport | Ferrari 488 Challenge Evo | 19 | (Spain) Manuel Cañizares | PA | 2–3 |
| (Germany) Mertel Motorsport | Ferrari 488 Challenge Evo | 19 | (Spain) Fernando Navarrete | PA | 2–3 |
| (Germany) Mertel Motorsport | Ferrari 488 Challenge Evo | 81 | (Netherlands) Leon Rijnbeek | Am | 1–3 |
| (Germany) Mertel Motorsport | Ferrari 488 Challenge Evo | 82 | (Italy) Tommaso Lovati | PA | 1–3 |
| (Germany) Mertel Motorsport | Ferrari 488 Challenge Evo | 82 | (Italy) Mauro Trentin | PA | 1–3 |
| (Germany) Mertel Motorsport | Ferrari 488 Challenge Evo | 83 | (Italy) Matteo Luvisi | S | 1–3 |
| (Germany) Mertel Motorsport | Ferrari 488 Challenge Evo | 83 | (Italy) Davide Larini | S | 1–3 |
| (Netherlands) Burgers Motorsport by Hans Weijs Motorsport | Porsche 992 GT3 Cup | 7 | (Netherlands) Laura van den Hengel | PA | All |
| (Netherlands) Burgers Motorsport by Hans Weijs Motorsport | Porsche 992 GT3 Cup | 7 | (Netherlands) Paul Meijer | PA | All |
| (Netherlands) Burgers Motorsport by Hans Weijs Motorsport | Porsche 992 GT3 Cup | 992 | (Italy) Davide Larini | S | 5 |
| (Netherlands) Burgers Motorsport by Hans Weijs Motorsport | Porsche 992 GT3 Cup | 992 | (Italy) Tommaso Lovati | S | 5 |
| (Italy) Scuderia Villorba Corse | Lamborghini Huracán Super Trofeo Evo2 | 8 | (San Marino) Luciano Privitellio | Am | 1–3, 5–6 |
| (Italy) Scuderia Villorba Corse | Lamborghini Huracán Super Trofeo Evo2 | 8 | (San Marino) Donovan Privitellio | Am | 6 |
| (Italy) Scuderia Villorba Corse | Lamborghini Huracán Super Trofeo Evo2 | 77 | (United Kingdom) Benjamin Cooke | Am | 4 |
| (Italy) Scuderia Villorba Corse | Lamborghini Huracán Super Trofeo Evo2 | 77 | (United Kingdom) Jamie William Falvey | Am | 4 |
| (Italy) Aggressive Team Italia | Lamborghini Huracán Super Trofeo Evo2 | 9 | (Italy) Mauro Guastamacchia | Am | 5 |
| (Italy) Aggressive Team Italia | Lamborghini Huracán Super Trofeo Evo2 | 24 | (Switzerland) Anny Frosio | Am | 5–6 |
| (Italy) Aggressive Team Italia | Lamborghini Huracán Super Trofeo Evo2 | 24 | (Spain) Iván Velasco | Am | 5–6 |
| (Italy) SP Racing Team | Porsche 992 GT3 Cup | 9 | (Italy) Daniele Cazzaniga | PA | 6 |
| (Italy) SP Racing Team | Porsche 992 GT3 Cup | 9 | (Italy) Andrea Galli | PA | 6 |
| (Italy) SP Racing Team | Porsche 992 GT3 Cup | 43 | (Italy) Luca Maria Attianese | PA | 1–4 |
| (Italy) SP Racing Team | Porsche 992 GT3 Cup | 43 | (Italy) Riccardo Romagnoli | PA | 1–4 |
| (Italy) SP Racing Team | Porsche 992 GT3 Cup | 55 | (Italy) Eugenio Pisani | PA | 1–2, 6 |
| (Italy) SP Racing Team | Porsche 992 GT3 Cup | 55 | (Italy) Stefano Serbi | PA | 1–2, 6 |
| (Italy) SP Racing Team | Porsche 992 GT3 Cup | 55 | (Italy) Stefano Serbi | Am | 3 |
| (Italy) SP Racing Team | Porsche 992 GT3 Cup | 55 | (Italy) Mark Speakerwas | Am | 3 |
| (Belgium) Q1-trackracing | Porsche 992 GT3 Cup | 11 | (Belgium) Stienes Longin | PA | All |
| (Belgium) Q1-trackracing | Porsche 992 GT3 Cup | 11 | (Belgium) Nicolas Saelens | PA | All |
| (Belgium) Q1-trackracing | Porsche 992 GT3 Cup | 53 | (Portugal) Gonçalo Fernandes | S | All |
| (Belgium) Q1-trackracing | Porsche 992 GT3 Cup | 53 | (Belgium) Lars Zaenen | S | All |
| (Belgium) Q1-trackracing | Porsche 992 GT3 Cup | 57 | (Belgium) Nathan Brauns | Am | All |
| (Belgium) Q1-trackracing | Porsche 992 GT3 Cup | 57 | (Belgium) Nicolas Vandierendonck | Am | All |
| (Belgium) Q1-trackracing | Porsche 992 GT3 Cup | 191 | (Venezuela) Javier Ripolli Jr. | Am | 5 |
| (Switzerland) Swisseagle | Porsche 992 GT3 Cup | 12 | (Italy) Glauco Solieri | Am | 1 |
| (United Kingdom) Greystone GT | McLaren Artura Trophy Evo | 13 | (United States) Ryan James | PA | 4 |
| (United Kingdom) Greystone GT | McLaren Artura Trophy Evo | 13 | (United Kingdom) Oliver Webb | PA | 4 |
| (Spain) Volcano Motorsport | Porsche 992 GT3 Cup | 16 | Evgenii Leonov (Note: Leonov is Russian, but he competes as neutral competitors as Russian national emblems were banned by the FIA following the Russian invasion of Ukraine.) | S | 1–4 |
| (Italy) ZRS Motorsport | Porsche 992 GT3 Cup | 17 | (Italy) Paolo Prestipino | Am | 3 |
| (Italy) ZRS Motorsport | Porsche 992 GT3 Cup | 17 | (Italy) Angelo Tomarchio | Am | 3 |
| (Italy) ZRS Motorsport | Porsche 992 GT3 Cup | 22 | (Italy) Pietro Armanni | S | All |
| (Italy) ZRS Motorsport | Porsche 992 GT3 Cup | 22 | (Italy) Ludovico Longoni | S | All |
| (Romania) RO1 Racing | Porsche 992 GT3 Cup | 21 | (Romania) Camil Perian | Am | 1–2, 4–6 |
| (Romania) RO1 Racing | Porsche 992 GT3 Cup | 21 | (Romania) Florin Tincescu | Am | 1–2, 4–6 |
| (Italy) Ebimotors | Porsche 992 GT3 Cup | 23 | (Italy) Cosimo Papi | Am | All |
| (Italy) Ebimotors | Porsche 992 GT3 Cup | 23 | (Italy) Sebastian Fortuna | Am | 1, 3–4 |
| (Italy) Ebimotors | Porsche 992 GT3 Cup | 23 | (Italy) Gianluigi Piccioli | Am | 2 |
| (Italy) Ebimotors | Porsche 992 GT3 Cup | 23 | (Italy) Paolo Gnemmi | Am | 6 |
| (Italy) Ebimotors | Porsche 992 GT3 Cup | 54 | (Italy) Luigi Peroni | Am | All |
| (Italy) Ebimotors | Porsche 992 GT3 Cup | 54 | (Italy) Gianluca Giorgi | Am | 1–4 |
| (Italy) Ebimotors | Porsche 992 GT3 Cup | 54 | (Italy) Davide Roda | Am | 5 |
| (Italy) Ebimotors | Porsche 992 GT3 Cup | 54 | (Italy) Sebastian Fortuna | Am | 6 |
| (Italy) Ebimotors | Porsche 992 GT3 Cup | 70 | (Italy) Gianluca Giorgi | Am | 6 |
| (Belgium) Icepol Racing Team 99 | Lamborghini Huracán Super Trofeo Evo2 | 27 | (Belgium) Rodrigue Gillon | Am | 2 |
| (San Marino) GDL Racing | Porsche 992 GT3 Cup | 33 | (Argentina) Fran Viel Bugliotti | Am | 1–5 |
| (San Marino) GDL Racing | Porsche 992 GT3 Cup | 44 | (Brazil) H. de Mello | Am | All |
| (San Marino) GDL Racing | Porsche 992 GT3 Cup | 63 | (Italy) Gabriele Lancieri | Am | 1 |
| (San Marino) GDL Racing | Porsche 992 GT3 Cup | 63 | (Italy) Danilo Paoletti | Am | 1 |
| (San Marino) GDL Racing | Porsche 992 GT3 Cup | 67 | (Italy) Giacomo Giubergia | Am | All |
| (Italy) Team Cars Racing | Porsche 992 GT3 Cup | 43 | (Italy) Riccardo Romagnoli | PA | 5–6 |
| (Italy) Team Cars Racing | Porsche 992 GT3 Cup | 43 | (Italy) Luca Maria Attianese | PA | 5 |
| (Italy) Team Cars Racing | Porsche 992 GT3 Cup | 43 | (Italy) Emanuele Romani | PA | 6 |
| (Estonia) EST1 Racing | Porsche 992 GT3 Cup | 47 | (Estonia) Alexander Reimann | S | 2 |
| (Portugal) LMR Motorsport | Porsche 992 GT3 Cup | 56 | (Brazil) Peter Ferter | PA | All |
| (Portugal) LMR Motorsport | Porsche 992 GT3 Cup | 56 | (Brazil) Diego Nunes | PA | All |
| (Portugal) LMR Motorsport | Porsche 992 GT3 Cup | 911 | (Portugal) Leandro Martins | Am | All |
| (Portugal) LMR Motorsport | Porsche 992 GT3 Cup | 911 | (Austria) Dieter Svepes | Am | All |
| (Spain) SMC Motorsport | McLaren Artura Trophy Evo | 69 | (Germany) Klaus Halsig | PA | 2 |
| (Spain) SMC Motorsport | McLaren Artura Trophy Evo | 69 | (Spain) Tommy Pintos | PA | 2 |
| (Ukraine) Tsunami RT | Porsche 992 GT3 Cup | 78 | (Italy) Fabio Babini | PA | 2–6 |
| (Ukraine) Tsunami RT | Porsche 992 GT3 Cup | 78 | (Italy) Davide Scanniccio | PA | 2–6 |
| (Italy) Faems Team | Porsche 992 GT3 Cup | 91 | (Italy) Luca Franca | S | All |
| (Italy) Faems Team | Porsche 992 GT3 Cup | 91 | (Guatemala) Ian Rodríguez | S | All |
| (Italy) Faems Team | Porsche 992 GT3 Cup | 93 | (Italy) Matteo Luvisi | S | 5–6 |
| (Italy) Faems Team | Porsche 992 GT3 Cup | 93 | (Italy) Matteo Martinelli | S | 5 |
| (Italy) Faems Team | Porsche 992 GT3 Cup | 93 | (Italy) Lodovico Laurini | S | 6 |
| (Italy) EasyRace | Ferrari 488 Challenge Evo | 403 | (Italy) Lorenzo Bontempelli | PA | 6 |
| (Italy) EasyRace | Ferrari 488 Challenge Evo | 403 | (Italy) Diego Di Fabio | PA | 6 |
| (Germany) Halder Motorsport | Porsche 992 GT3 Cup | 741 | (Germany) Mike Halder | PA | 6 |
| (Germany) Halder Motorsport | Porsche 992 GT3 Cup | 741 | (Denmark) Rene Junker Povlsen | PA | 6 |

| Icon | Class |
|---|---|
| S | Silver Cup |
| PA | Pro-Am Cup |
| Am | Am Cup |

== Championship standings ==
source:
