= Wojciech Kania =

- Wojciech Kania c. 1947
- Born: 1 April 1912; Łodygowice
- Died: 5 May 1991 (aged 79); Bielsko-Biała
- Military career
- Allegiance: Second Polish Republic; Polish Armed Forces in the West
- Service years: 1932–1950
- Rank: Major/Podpułkownik
- Conflicts: World War II; September Campaign; Siege of Tobruk; Battle of Monte Cassino

Wojciech Kania (b. 1 April 1912 in Łodygowice, d. 5 May 1991 (aged 79) in Bielsko-Biała) – major of Polish Armed Forces in the West, promoted to the rank of podpułkownik after the war.

Kania was a son of Józef and Katarzyna (née Duraj). In 1932 he graduated from gymnasium (now I Liceum Ogólnokształcące im. Mikołaja Kopernika w Bielsku-Białej) in Bielsko-Biała and joined the military service. He completed the Dywizyjny Kurs Podchorążych (division podchorąży course) while assigned to the 4 Pułk Strzelców Podhalańskich (4 PSP) in Cieszyn, and then joined the Szkoła Podchorążych Piechoty school. After graduating in 1935 he obtained the rank of podporucznik and was assigned to the 4 PSP.

In September 1939, in the rank of porucznik, he commanded an anti-armor company of the 4 PSP. On 16 September he was captured after a battle fought near Dzikowo. After seven days of captivity he escaped from a train transport near Bieżanów and returned to his home region.

In Łodygowice he engaged in underground activity of the ZWZ. On 13 January 1940 he tried to escape from the country crossing the border near the mountain of Pilsko but was captured by Slovakian police and sent back. In March, after Easter, he tried to escape again. He managed to get to Budapest and acquire false identity documents there. Through Yugoslavia he got to Split and from there to Lebanon on board of the Greek ship Patris.

In Syria he joined the Samodzielna Brygada Strzelców Karpackich which was later transferred to Tobruk, where he organised the anti-tank defence. During the inspection of general Władysław Sikorski in November 1941 he got promoted to the rank of kapitan. On 17 December 1941 he was severely injured in battle near Ain-el-Ghazala.

In February 1942 he returned to active duty rewarded with the Military Cross and twice with a Cross of Valour (Krzyż Walecznych) for his actions. From September 1942 he was in command of anti-tank artillery division, first in the 1 Karpacki Pułk Artylerii Lekkiej and then in the 3 Karpacki Pułk Artylerii Przeciwpancernej. In Italy he took part in the battles of Monte Cassino, Pesaro, Ancona, Osimo, Gothic Line, Brisighella and Montefortino. For the Battle of Monte Cassino, he was awarded another Cross of Valour and, for the Montefortino battle, with the Silver Cross of the Virtuti Militari. In January 1945 he was promoted to the rank of major and took a position as second-in-command of the 8th Battalion of 3 Dywizja Strzelców Karpackich.

After Germany's surrender he remained in service in Italy. In 1946 he was transferred to England and in 1947 he returned to Poland. He worked in Centralny Urząd Planowania and then, after having taken an administration course, in the PKPG. In 1950 he was released from duty; afterwards, he worked in a construction materials plant till retirement.

He was a chairman of a local veterans' society. In 1967 he received a second Silver Cross of the Virtuti Militari for the battles that took place in September 1939. In January 1981 he received the Officer's Cross of Order of Polonia Restituta (Order Odrodzenia Polski). During that time he was also promoted to the rank of podpułkownik. He died on 5 May 1991 and was buried at a cemetery in Bielsko-Biała with his wife Bronisława (née Rudomino-Dusiacka).

== Decorations ==
- Silver Cross of the Virtuti Militari – twice
- Officer's Cross of the Order of Polonia Restituta (Order Odrodzenia Polski)
- Cross of Valour (Poland) (Krzyż Walecznych), three times
- Monte Cassino Commemorative Cross
- Military Cross (United Kingdom)
- Italy Star
- Africa Star
- 1939-1945 Star
