= 2025 Euroformula Open Championship =

2025 formula racing championship

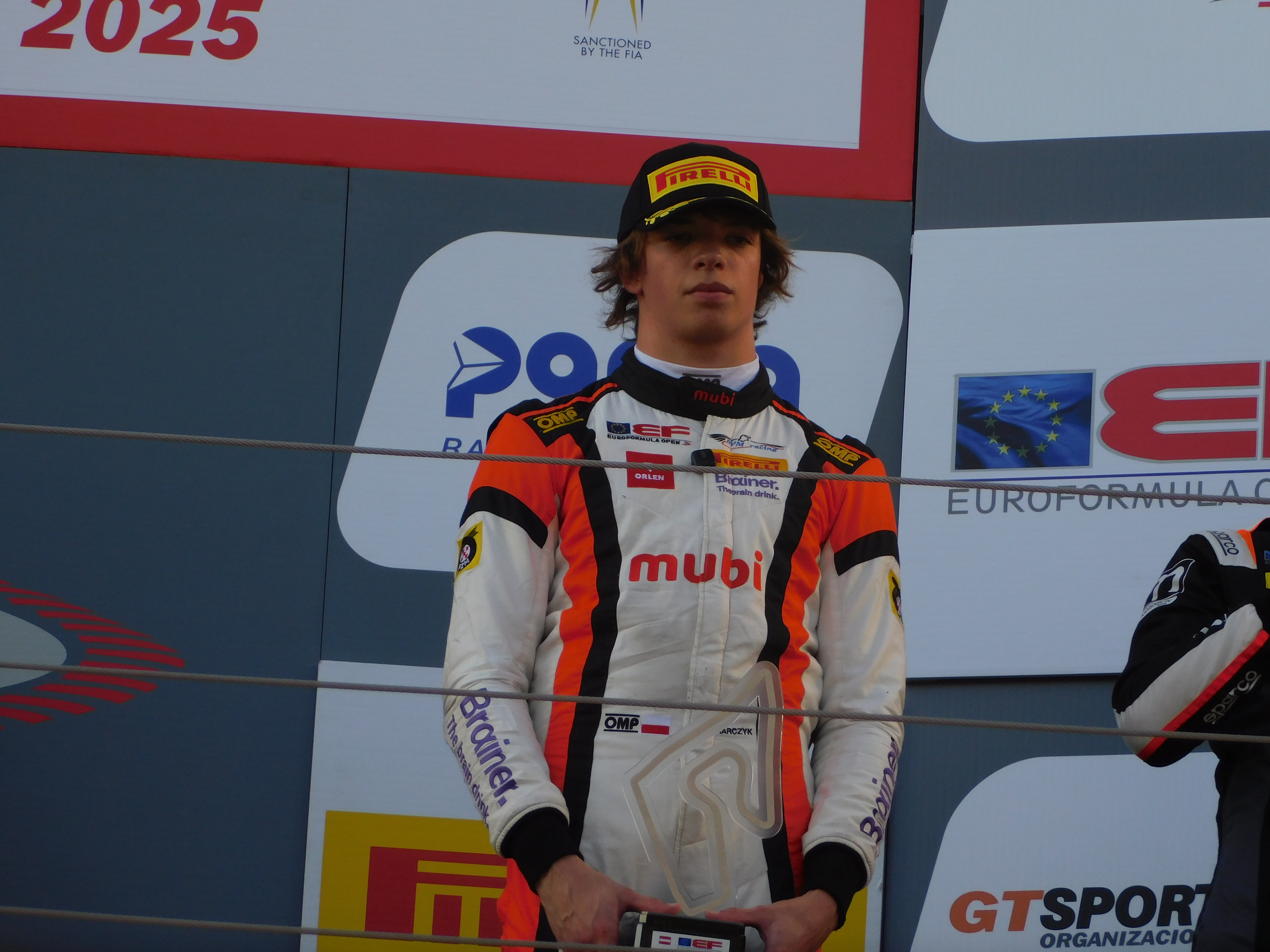
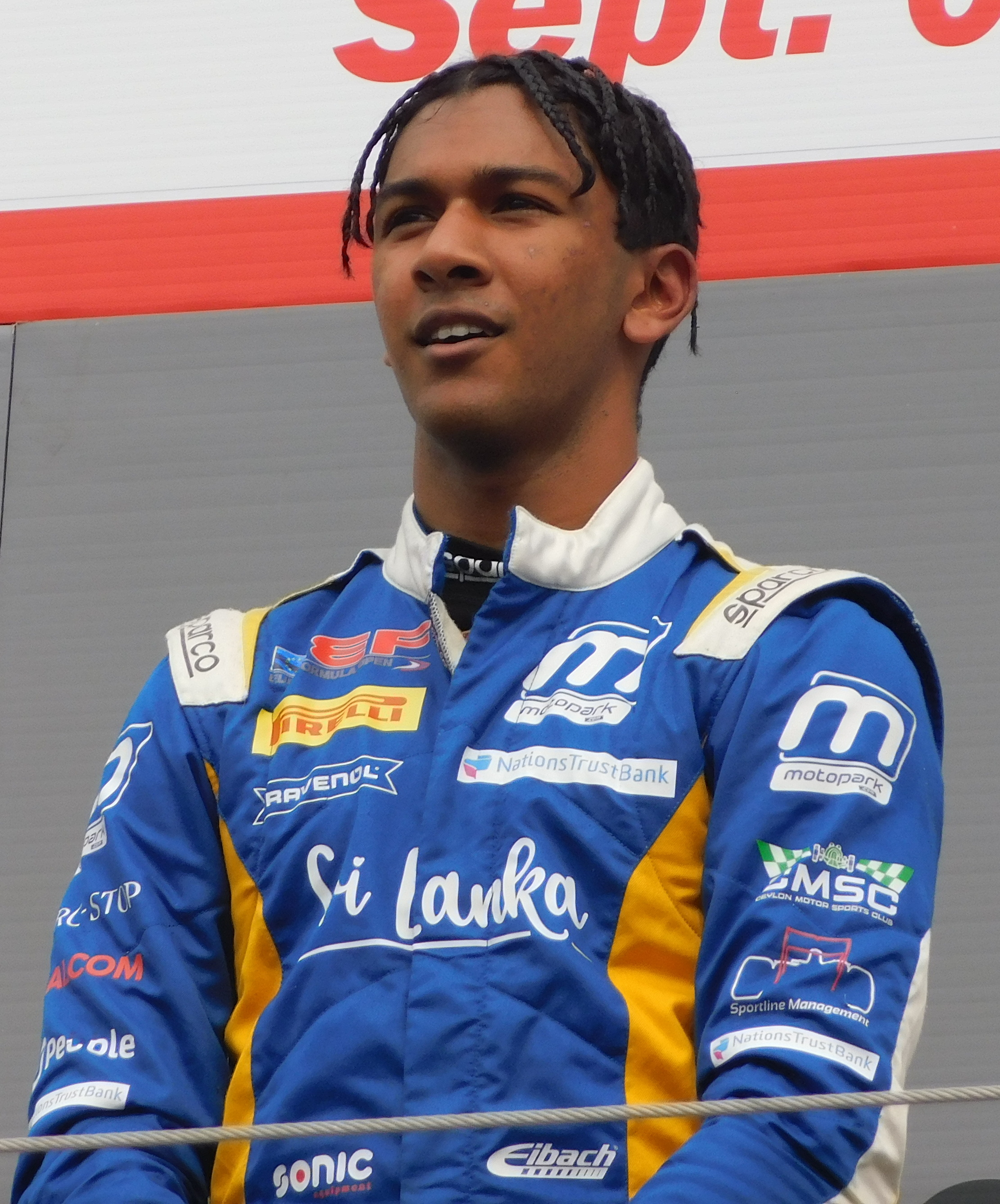
Tymek Kucharczyk (BVM Racing, top) won the Drivers' Championship. Yevan David (Team Motopark, bottom) won the Rookie Championship.

The 2025 Euroformula Open Championship was a multi-event open-wheel single-seater motor racing championship held across Europe. It was the twelfth season using the Euroformula Open name. The season was held over eight rounds with three races each. It began on April 26 at Algarve International Circuit, and concluded on 19 October at Autodromo Nazionale di Monza.

The season was the first using the Dallara 324 chassis, as well as a spec Toyota engine. This change, aimed at reducing costs, aligned the championship's technical specification with that of the Super Formula Lights.

BVM Racing's Tymek Kucharczyk won the Drivers' Championship at the penultimate race of the season, while runner-up Yevan David took the Rookie Championship as his team, Team Motopark, defended their Teams' Championship title for the seventh year in a row.

== Teams and drivers ==
Team	No.	Driver	Status	Rounds
(Italy) BVM Racing	3	(Poland) Tymek Kucharczyk		All
(Italy) BVM Racing	4	Vladislav Ryabov (Note: Ryabov is Russian, but he competes as a neutral competitor as Russian national emblems were banned by the FIA following the Russian invasion of Ukraine.)		1–2
(Italy) BVM Racing	4	(Venezuela) Alessandro Famularo		6–8
(Italy) BVM Racing	5	(Hungary) Benjámin Berta		4
(Italy) BVM Racing	6	(United States) Preston Lambert	R	5
(Italy) BVM Racing	77	(Chinese Taipei) Enzo Yeh	R	7–8
(United Kingdom) Nielsen Racing	7	(Argentina) Francisco Soldavini	R	6
(United Kingdom) Nielsen Racing	7	(Cyprus) Theo Micouris		7
(United Kingdom) Nielsen Racing	7	(Greece) Stylianos Kolovos	R G	8
(United Kingdom) Nielsen Racing	24	(United Kingdom) Edward Pearson		All
(United Kingdom) Nielsen Racing	27	(Brazil) Ricardo Baptista	R	6
(United Kingdom) Nielsen Racing	27	(Romania) Luca Viișoreanu	R	8
(United Kingdom) Nielsen Racing	32	(United States) Shawn Rashid		1–4
(United Kingdom) Nielsen Racing	32	(Argentina) Gino Trappa	R	5
(United Kingdom) Nielsen Racing	69	(United Kingdom) Finley Green		1–5
(Germany) Team Motopark	9	(United States) Everett Stack	R	All
(Germany) Team Motopark	11	(Romania) Luca Viișoreanu	R	6
(Germany) Team Motopark	21	(Sri Lanka) Yevan David	R	All
(Germany) Team Motopark	23	(South Korea) Michael Shin		All
(Germany) Team Motopark	41	(Brazil) Fernando Barrichello		1–5, 7–8
(Germany) Team Motopark	44	(Mexico) Diego de la Torre		All
(Germany) Team Motopark	99	(Mexico) José Garfias		All
(Serbia) NV Racing	212	(Serbia) Paolo Brajnik	G	1–6

Icon	Class
R	Rookie Championship
G	Gentleman Class
G	Guest

- Francesco Simonazzi was scheduled to compete for BVM Racing, but withdrew prior to the start of the season.

== Race calendar ==
An eight-round calendar was announced on 11 July 2024. It featured the same eight circuits present on the 2024 calendar.

Round		Circuit	Date	Support bill	Map of circuit locations
1	R1	(Portugal) Algarve International Circuit, Portimão	26 April	International GT Open; GT Cup Open Europe; TCR Europe Touring Car Series; Porsche Sprint Challenge Iberica	2025 Euroformula Open Championship is located in Europe
1	R2	(Portugal) Algarve International Circuit, Portimão	27 April	International GT Open; GT Cup Open Europe; TCR Europe Touring Car Series; Porsche Sprint Challenge Iberica	2025 Euroformula Open Championship is located in Europe
1	R3	(Portugal) Algarve International Circuit, Portimão	27 April	International GT Open; GT Cup Open Europe; TCR Europe Touring Car Series; Porsche Sprint Challenge Iberica	2025 Euroformula Open Championship is located in Europe
2	R1	(Belgium) Circuit de Spa-Francorchamps, Stavelot	17 May	International GT Open; GT Cup Open Europe; TCR Europe Touring Car Series; Formula Regional European Championship	2025 Euroformula Open Championship is located in Europe
2	R2	(Belgium) Circuit de Spa-Francorchamps, Stavelot	18 May	International GT Open; GT Cup Open Europe; TCR Europe Touring Car Series; Formula Regional European Championship	2025 Euroformula Open Championship is located in Europe
2	R3	(Belgium) Circuit de Spa-Francorchamps, Stavelot	18 May	International GT Open; GT Cup Open Europe; TCR Europe Touring Car Series; Formula Regional European Championship	2025 Euroformula Open Championship is located in Europe
3	R1	(Germany) Hockenheimring, Hockenheim	7 June	International GT Open; GT Cup Open Europe; TCR Europe Touring Car Series	2025 Euroformula Open Championship is located in Europe
3	R2	(Germany) Hockenheimring, Hockenheim	8 June	International GT Open; GT Cup Open Europe; TCR Europe Touring Car Series	2025 Euroformula Open Championship is located in Europe
3	R3	(Germany) Hockenheimring, Hockenheim	8 June	International GT Open; GT Cup Open Europe; TCR Europe Touring Car Series	2025 Euroformula Open Championship is located in Europe
4	R1	(Hungary) Hungaroring, Mogyoród	5 July	International GT Open; Formula Regional European Championship; GB3 Championship; Porsche Carrera Cup Benelux	2025 Euroformula Open Championship is located in Europe
4	R2	(Hungary) Hungaroring, Mogyoród	6 July	International GT Open; Formula Regional European Championship; GB3 Championship; Porsche Carrera Cup Benelux	2025 Euroformula Open Championship is located in Europe
4	R3	(Hungary) Hungaroring, Mogyoród	6 July	International GT Open; Formula Regional European Championship; GB3 Championship; Porsche Carrera Cup Benelux	2025 Euroformula Open Championship is located in Europe
5	R1	(France) Circuit Paul Ricard, Le Castellet	19 July	International GT Open; GT Cup Open Europe; Formula Regional European Championship; E4 Championship	2025 Euroformula Open Championship is located in Europe
5	R2	(France) Circuit Paul Ricard, Le Castellet	20 July	International GT Open; GT Cup Open Europe; Formula Regional European Championship; E4 Championship	2025 Euroformula Open Championship is located in Europe
5	R3	(France) Circuit Paul Ricard, Le Castellet	20 July	International GT Open; GT Cup Open Europe; Formula Regional European Championship; E4 Championship	2025 Euroformula Open Championship is located in Europe
6	R1	(Austria) Red Bull Ring, Spielberg	6 September	International GT Open; TCR Europe Touring Car Series; Formula Regional European Championship	2025 Euroformula Open Championship is located in Europe
6	R2	(Austria) Red Bull Ring, Spielberg	7 September	International GT Open; TCR Europe Touring Car Series; Formula Regional European Championship	2025 Euroformula Open Championship is located in Europe
6	R3	(Austria) Red Bull Ring, Spielberg	7 September	International GT Open; TCR Europe Touring Car Series; Formula Regional European Championship	2025 Euroformula Open Championship is located in Europe
7	R1	(Spain) Circuit de Barcelona-Catalunya, Montmeló	20 September	International GT Open; GT Cup Open Europe; Formula Regional European Championship; Italian F4 Championship	2025 Euroformula Open Championship is located in Europe
7	R2	(Spain) Circuit de Barcelona-Catalunya, Montmeló	21 September	International GT Open; GT Cup Open Europe; Formula Regional European Championship; Italian F4 Championship	2025 Euroformula Open Championship is located in Europe
7	R3	(Spain) Circuit de Barcelona-Catalunya, Montmeló	21 September	International GT Open; GT Cup Open Europe; Formula Regional European Championship; Italian F4 Championship	2025 Euroformula Open Championship is located in Europe
8	R1	(Italy) Autodromo Nazionale di Monza, Monza	18 October	International GT Open; GT Cup Open Europe; GB3 Championship; Renault Clio Cup	2025 Euroformula Open Championship is located in Europe
8	R2	(Italy) Autodromo Nazionale di Monza, Monza	18 October	International GT Open; GT Cup Open Europe; GB3 Championship; Renault Clio Cup	2025 Euroformula Open Championship is located in Europe
8	R3	(Italy) Autodromo Nazionale di Monza, Monza	19 October	International GT Open; GT Cup Open Europe; GB3 Championship; Renault Clio Cup	2025 Euroformula Open Championship is located in Europe

== Race results ==
Round		Circuit	Pole position	Fastest lap	Winning driver	Winning team	Rookie winner	Gold Cup winner
1	R1	(Portugal) Algarve International Circuit	(Poland) Tymek Kucharczyk	(Poland) Tymek Kucharczyk	(United Kingdom) Edward Pearson	(United Kingdom) Nielsen Racing	(Sri Lanka) Yevan David	no classified finishers
1	R2	(Portugal) Algarve International Circuit		(United Kingdom) Edward Pearson	(Sri Lanka) Yevan David	(Germany) Team Motopark	(Sri Lanka) Yevan David	(Serbia) Paolo Brajnik
1	R3	(Portugal) Algarve International Circuit		(South Korea) Michael Shin	(Sri Lanka) Yevan David	(Germany) Team Motopark	(Sri Lanka) Yevan David	no starters
2	R1	(Belgium) Circuit de Spa-Francorchamps	(Sri Lanka) Yevan David	(Mexico) José Garfias	(Sri Lanka) Yevan David	(Germany) Team Motopark	(Sri Lanka) Yevan David	(Serbia) Paolo Brajnik
2	R2	(Belgium) Circuit de Spa-Francorchamps		(Poland) Tymek Kucharczyk	(Poland) Tymek Kucharczyk	(Italy) BVM Racing	(Sri Lanka) Yevan David	no starters
2	R3	(Belgium) Circuit de Spa-Francorchamps		(Sri Lanka) Yevan David	(Poland) Tymek Kucharczyk	(Italy) BVM Racing	(Sri Lanka) Yevan David	no starters
3	R1	(Germany) Hockenheimring	(Poland) Tymek Kucharczyk	(South Korea) Michael Shin	(South Korea) Michael Shin	(Germany) Team Motopark	(United States) Everett Stack	(Serbia) Paolo Brajnik
3	R2	(Germany) Hockenheimring		(South Korea) Michael Shin	(Mexico) José Garfias	(Germany) Team Motopark	(Sri Lanka) Yevan David	no classified finishers
3	R3	(Germany) Hockenheimring		(South Korea) Michael Shin	(Sri Lanka) Yevan David	(Germany) Team Motopark	(Sri Lanka) Yevan David	no starters
4	R1	(Hungary) Hungaroring	(Poland) Tymek Kucharczyk	(Poland) Tymek Kucharczyk	(Poland) Tymek Kucharczyk	(Italy) BVM Racing	(United States) Everett Stack	no entries
4	R2	(Hungary) Hungaroring		(South Korea) Michael Shin	(South Korea) Michael Shin	(Germany) Team Motopark	(Sri Lanka) Yevan David	no entries
4	R3	(Hungary) Hungaroring		(Mexico) José Garfias	(Mexico) José Garfias	(Germany) Team Motopark	(Sri Lanka) Yevan David	no entries
5	R1	(France) Circuit Paul Ricard	(Poland) Tymek Kucharczyk	(Poland) Tymek Kucharczyk	(Poland) Tymek Kucharczyk	(Italy) BVM Racing	(Sri Lanka) Yevan David	(Serbia) Paolo Brajnik
5	R2	(France) Circuit Paul Ricard		(Poland) Tymek Kucharczyk	(Brazil) Fernando Barrichello	(Germany) Team Motopark	(United States) Preston Lambert	(Serbia) Paolo Brajnik
5	R3	(France) Circuit Paul Ricard		(Poland) Tymek Kucharczyk	(Mexico) José Garfias	(Germany) Team Motopark	(United States) Everett Stack	no starters
6	R1	(Austria) Red Bull Ring	(Poland) Tymek Kucharczyk	(South Korea) Michael Shin	(South Korea) Michael Shin	(Germany) Team Motopark	(United States) Everett Stack	(Serbia) Paolo Brajnik
6	R2	(Austria) Red Bull Ring		(South Korea) Michael Shin	(Sri Lanka) Yevan David	(Germany) Team Motopark	(Sri Lanka) Yevan David	(Serbia) Paolo Brajnik
6	R3	(Austria) Red Bull Ring		(Poland) Tymek Kucharczyk	(United States) Everett Stack	(Germany) Team Motopark	(United States) Everett Stack	no starters
7	R1	(Spain) Circuit de Barcelona-Catalunya	(Sri Lanka) Yevan David	(Poland) Tymek Kucharczyk	(Poland) Tymek Kucharczyk	(Italy) BVM Racing	(Sri Lanka) Yevan David	no entries
7	R2	(Spain) Circuit de Barcelona-Catalunya		(Mexico) José Garfias	(United Kingdom) Edward Pearson	(United Kingdom) Nielsen Racing	(Sri Lanka) Yevan David	no entries
7	R3	(Spain) Circuit de Barcelona-Catalunya		(Brazil) Fernando Barrichello	(South Korea) Michael Shin	(Germany) Team Motopark	(Sri Lanka) Yevan David	no entries
8	R1	(Italy) Autodromo Nazionale di Monza	(Sri Lanka) Yevan David	(Chinese Taipei) Enzo Yeh	(United States) Everett Stack	(Germany) Team Motopark	(United States) Everett Stack	no entries
8	R2	(Italy) Autodromo Nazionale di Monza		(Sri Lanka) Yevan David	(Poland) Tymek Kucharczyk	(Italy) BVM Racing	(Sri Lanka) Yevan David	no entries
8	R3	(Italy) Autodromo Nazionale di Monza		(Poland) Tymek Kucharczyk	(Sri Lanka) Yevan David	(Germany) Team Motopark	(Sri Lanka) Yevan David	no entries

== Season report ==
=== First half ===
The 2025 Euroformula Open championship began at the Algarve International Circuit with BVM Racing's Tymek Kucharczyk leading a twelve-car field in qualifying. He was among four drivers stalling at the start of race one, allowing Team Motopark's Yevan David to lead briefly before contact with his teammate Michael Shin dropped him behind. Shin then headed Nielsen Racing's Edward Pearson until he spun on lap 16, handing Pearson victory on Nielsen Racing’s single-seater debut ahead of Shin and David. Motopark's Fernando Barrichello started race two from reversed-grid pole position, but had a bad start, allowing his teammate José Garfias into the lead. The Mexican then went off on lap seven, handing the lead to David, who won ahead of Shin and Pearson. The final race saw Shin lead initially before David moved ahead on lap three; a safety car period and subsequent red flag on lap 13 meant the Sri Lankan driver was declared winner over Shin, with Kucharczyk third. David left Portugal leading the standings on 65 points, ten ahead of Shin.

David claimed pole at Circuit de Spa-Francorchamps, 0.488 seconds ahead of Garfias, while Shin and Motopark's Diego de la Torre filled the second row. In the opening race, Garfias and Shin both passed David on the first lap before colliding at Les Combes, allowing the Sri Lankan to retake the lead. A safety car appeared after Barrichello crashed, and following the restart, Kucharczyk briefly led before running wide and losing out to David again. Two further incidents brought another neutralisation, and after a late restart the pair exchanged positions multiple times before David prevailed by 0.07 seconds, with de la Torre third. In race two, Kucharczyk rose from fifth to take victory after a safety-car period, as Shin spun David out of contention and Pearson finished second ahead of Barrichello. The Polish driver then won again in race three, taking the lead on lap one and holding off a late charge from David, who came home in second ahead of Garfias. His double win lifted Kucharczyk to second place in the standings, 20 points behind David.

Round three at the Hockenheimring saw Kucharczyk take pole position, narrowly ahead of De la Torre and David, while Shin qualified fourth. De la Torre’s car failed before the start of race one, but Kucharczyk still fell behind David and Shin into turn one before contact with David caused a puncture and front-wing damage for both. Shin was therefore able to pull clear as Motopark's Everett Stack, Garfias and Pearson disputed second. Stack prevailed, giving Motopark a one-two ahead of Pearson. Rain greeted the reversed-grid race two, where Garfias moved past Nielsen Racing's early leader Shawn Rashid and held off Shin and David to take his maiden EFO win. David had climbed from tenth to third after several close fights, finishing 1.3 seconds behind Shin at the flag. In the final race, David and Shin again rose quickly through the order before rain brought further incidents. David passed Stack for the lead and stayed ahead after a safety-car restart to win from Shin and Garfias. Shin moved back into second place in the standings, 18 points behind David.

Kucharczyk secured another pole position at the Hungaroring as the first half of the season drew to a close. He began the first race off a clear front row as David had a grid penalty and Shin started from the back of the field. He converted that into a dominant lights-to-flag victory ahead of Garfias. Behind them, Stack held third as Shin climbed from the back to claim fourth. David took eighth at the flag, his championship lead reduced to ten points. In Sunday’s reversed-grid race, front-row starters Pearson and Shin ran wide at turn one, but Shin quickly regained control and passed him for the lead on lap three. He then pulled away to win, taking the points lead from David, who finished third after clearing Garfias but failing to pass Pearson. BVM's one-off entrant Benjámin Berta started race three on pole position, yet Garfias seized the lead into turn one and maintained it to the end. Shin and Kucharczyk’s lap-eight collision removed the latter from contention, allowing Shin to finish third behind Berta and retain a four-point championship advantage.

=== Second half ===
Pole position at Circuit Paul Ricard went to Kucharczyk once again, with David second. In the opening race, David followed Kucharczyk through the opening corners but came under pressure from Barrichello, who was then overtaken by Garfias. Pearson’s collision with Shin brought out the safety car on lap three, and Kucharczyk controlled the remainder of the race to lead David and Garfias home. BVM's debutant Preston Lambert started from reversed-grid pole position in race two and resisted pressure from Barrichello until lap 13, when the Brazilian took the lead to claim victory. Kucharczyk followed them home in third as David fell outside the points after a collision with Garfias, handing the Pole a one-point championship lead. Lambert again started race three from pole position, but Garfias took the lead into turn one as Barrichello briefly went off while disputing second. Shin rose to second before pitting with damage, leaving Garfias to take victory ahead of Kucharczyk and Barrichello. Kucharczyk left France with a 17-point advantage over David.

Qualifying at the Red Bull Ring brough Kucharczyk's fifth pole position of the season. De la Torre led the opening race into turn one before running wide at turn four while battling Shin, who took over at the front ahead of Garfias. Kucharczyk and de la Torre disputed third, with the Pole eventually coming out ahead. He closed on Garfias in the final laps but could not find a way past, while Shin won by 7.5 seconds. David started race two from reversed-grid pole position and maintained the lead throughout. Stack took second from Kucharczyk on lap one before a safety car interruption. After racing resumed on lap seven, Shin passed Stack for second on lap 13, and late position changes behind elevated both Kucharczyk and Garfias when Stack received a five-second penalty. Stack converted reversed-grid pole position into victory in race three as an early puncture delayed David. Garfias briefly led after Stack ran wide on lap 11, but a lock-up two laps later dropped him back behind Stack and Kucharczyk, who ended the round ten points ahead of Shin.

The penultimate round was held at Circuit de Barcelona-Catalunya, where David reclaimed top spot in qualifying. A slow getaway dropped him to third in race one, enabling Kucharczyk to assume the lead. David passed de la Torre for second on lap 11. A multi-car battle for third formed in the closing laps, and Barrichello secured the place ahead of Pearson. BVM's Alessandro Famularo and Nielsen's debutant Theo Micouris shared the front row for race two but both started poorly, allowing Pearson into an early lead before Barrichello took over into turn one. Pearson reclaimed first on the next lap and controlled the pace thereafter as David moved past Barrichello for second on lap 13. Wet conditions prompted a safety car start to race three, and Shin’s early switch to slick tyres proved decisive as he charged through the field to lead by lap eight and eventually win by over a minute. Micouris held second, while Garfias prevailed in the fight for third. Aided by Shin's non-score in race one, Kucharczyk left Barcelona with an extended 23-point margin.

David claimed pole for the Monza finale ahead of Kucharczyk and Shin. In race one, he kept the lead through turn one before pressure from Garfias and Shin created a six-car train also including Stack and Kucharczyk. A series of incidents reorganised the order; Shin was eliminated after a collision, and Garfias later spun while disputing the lead with David. The pack settled in the final laps, with Stack pulling clear, Barrichello moving into second, and Kucharczyk securing third. Race two developed as a sustained slipstream group after early position swaps between David, Stack, Shin and Garfias. Kucharczyk gradually advanced from the pack and entered the final lap in contention, leading by 0.001 seconds in a three-wide run to the line to win and seal the championship. The final race again produced a dense lead group featuring David, Garfias, Stack and Kucharczyk. After losing ground early, David recovered through mid-race slipstream exchanges and completed a decisive pass in the closing stages, ending the season with his sixth victory.

== Championship standings ==
=== Drivers' championship ===
Points were awarded as follows:

Position	1st	2nd	3rd	4th	5th	6th	7th	8th	9th	10th	Pole	FL
Points	25	18	15	12	10	8	6	4	2	1	**1**	1

Each drivers' three worst scores (excluding disqualifications) were dropped.

Pos	Driver	PRT (Portugal)			SPA (Belgium)			HOC (Germany)			HUN (Hungary)			LEC (France)			RBR (Austria)			CAT (Spain)			MNZ (Italy)			Pts
Pos	Driver	R1	R2	R3	R1	R2	R3	R1	R2	R3	R1	R2	R3	R1	R2	R3	R1	R2	R3	R1	R2	R3	R1	R2	R3	Pts
1	(Poland) Tymek Kucharczyk	(**8**)	4	3	2	1	1	(**8**)	4	4	**1**	4	(11)	**1**	3	2	**3**	3	3	1	4	7	3	1	7	362
2	(Sri Lanka) Yevan David	3	1	1	**1**	4	2	(10)	3	1	8	3	4	2	(12)	10	6	1	(11)	**2**	2	5	**6**	2	1	345
3	(South Korea) Michael Shin	2	2	2	6	7	4	1	2	2	4	1	3	(Ret)	4	(9)	1	2	5	(11)	7	1	9†	8	3	317
4	(Mexico) José Garfias	6	7	4	10	8†	3	4	1	3	2	5	1	3	(11)	1	2	4	2	(10)	10	3	7	(11†)	4	276
5	(United Kingdom) Edward Pearson	1	3	9	4	2	(10)	3	6	7	6	2	8	(Ret)	6	7	7	6	4	4	1	8	4	(Ret)	9	227
6	(United States) Everett Stack	5	9	6	5	(Ret)	7	2	(Ret)	5	3	(10)	5	7	5	4	5	8	1	9	6	9†	1	3	2	226
7	(Brazil) Fernando Barrichello	4	6	7	Ret	3	5	5	7	6	7	6	7	5	1	3				3	3	6	2	10	6	212
8	(Mexico) Diego de la Torre	7	5	(Ret)	3	(Ret)	6	(DNS)	5	Ret	5	7	6	4	8	6	4	5	8	8	9	Ret	8	5	5	153
9	(Venezuela) Alessandro Famularo																8	7	6	6	5	4	5	7	8	68
10	(United States) Shawn Rashid	Ret	11	8	8	6	9	6	8	8†	10	8	9													41
11	(Cyprus) Theo Micouris																			5	8	2				32
12	(United Kingdom) Finley Green	10	8	10	7	Ret	11	7	9	Ret	11	11	10	8	9	8										31
13	Vladislav Ryabov	9	10	5	Ret	5	8																			27
14	(United States) Preston Lambert													6	2	Ret										26
15	(Hungary) Benjámin Berta										9	9	2													22
16	(Chinese Taipei) Enzo Yeh																			7	11	Ret	10†	4	10	21
17	(Argentina) Gino Trappa													9	7	5										18
18	(Romania) Luca Viișoreanu																9	9	7				Ret	6	11	18
19	(Serbia) Paolo Brajnik	Ret	12	DNS	9	DNS	DNS	9	Ret	DNS	WD	WD	WD	10	10	DNS	11	11	DNS							6
20	(Argentina) Francisco Soldavini																10	10	9							4
21	(Brazil) Ricardo Baptista																Ret	Ret	10							1
Guest drivers ineligible to score points
—	(Greece) Stylianos Kolovos																						Ret	9	12	0
Pos	Driver	R1	R2	R3	R1	R2	R3	R1	R2	R3	R1	R2	R3	R1	R2	R3	R1	R2	R3	R1	R2	R3	R1	R2	R3	Pts
Pos	Driver	PRT (Portugal)			SPA (Belgium)			HOC (Germany)			HUN (Hungary)			LEC (France)			RBR (Austria)			CAT (Spain)			MNZ (Italy)			Pts

Colour	Result
Gold	Winner
Silver	Second place
Bronze	Third place
Green	Points classification
Blue	Non-points classification
Blue	Non-classified finish (NC)
Purple	Retired, not classified (Ret)
Red	Did not qualify (DNQ)
Red	Did not pre-qualify (DNPQ)
Black	Disqualified (DSQ)
White	Did not start (DNS)
White	Withdrew (WD)
White	Race cancelled (C)
Blank	Did not practice (DNP)
Blank	Did not arrive (DNA)
Blank	Excluded (EX)

**Bold** – Pole

Italics – Fastest Lap

† – Did not finish, but classified
(completed more than 75%
of the race distance)

=== Rookies' championship ===
Points were awarded as follows:

Position	1st	2nd	3rd	4th	5th
Points	10	8	6	4	3

Each drivers' three worst scores (excluding disqualifications) were dropped.

Pos	Driver	PRT (Portugal)			SPA (Belgium)			HOC (Germany)			HUN (Hungary)			LEC (France)			RBR (Austria)			CAT (Spain)			MNZ (Italy)			Pts
Pos	Driver	R1	R2	R3	R1	R2	R3	R1	R2	R3	R1	R2	R3	R1	R2	R3	R1	R2	R3	R1	R2	R3	R1	R2	R3	Pts
1	(Sri Lanka) Yevan David	1	1	1	1	1	1	2	1	1	2	1	1	1	(4)	(3)	2	1	(5)	1	1	1	2	1	1	202
2	(United States) Everett Stack	2	2	2	2	(Ret)	2	1	(Ret)	2	1	2	2	(3)	2	1	1	2	1	3	2	2†	1	2	2	178
3	(Chinese Taipei) Enzo Yeh																			2	3	Ret	3	3	3	32
4	(Romania) Luca Viișoreanu																3	3	2				Ret	4	4	28
5	(United States) Preston Lambert													2	1	Ret										18
6	(Argentina) Gino Trappa													4	3	2										18
7	(Argentina) Francisco Soldavini																4	4	3							14
8	(Brazil) Ricardo Baptista																Ret	Ret	4							4
Guest drivers ineligible to score points
—	(Greece) Stylianos Kolovos																						Ret	5	5	0
Pos	Driver	R1	R2	R3	R1	R2	R3	R1	R2	R3	R1	R2	R3	R1	R2	R3	R1	R2	R3	R1	R2	R3	R1	R2	R3	Pts
Pos	Driver	PRT (Portugal)			SPA (Belgium)			HOC (Germany)			HUN (Hungary)			LEC (France)			RBR (Austria)			CAT (Spain)			MNZ (Italy)			Pts

=== Teams' championship ===
Points were awarded according to the same structure as in the rookies' championship, with each team nominating two drivers to score teams' championship points ahead of the round and non-nominated drivers not scoring or blocking points.

Pos	Driver	PRT (Portugal)			SPA (Belgium)			HOC (Germany)			HUN (Hungary)			LEC (France)			RBR (Austria)			CAT (Spain)			MNZ (Italy)			Pts
Pos	Driver	R1	R2	R3	R1	R2	R3	R1	R2	R3	R1	R2	R3	R1	R2	R3	R1	R2	R3	R1	R2	R3	R1	R2	R3	Pts
1	(Germany) Team Motopark	2	1	1	1	3	2	2	1	1	2	2	1	2	5	1	1	1	3	2	2	2	3	2	1	309
1	(Germany) Team Motopark	3	2	2	6	6	3	5	2	2	4	4	3	3	6	5	3	2	6	6	5	3	4	5	2	309
2	(Italy) BVM Racing	8	4	3	2	1	1	4	3	3	1	3	2	1	1	2	2	3	1	1	3	4	1	1	3	227
2	(Italy) BVM Racing	9	10	5	Ret	4	4				5	6	6	4	2	Ret	5	5	4	5	6	Ret	5	3	5	227
3	(United Kingdom) Nielsen Racing	1	3	8	3	2	5	1	4	4	3	1	4	5	3	3	4	4	2	3	1	1	2	4	4	191
3	(United Kingdom) Nielsen Racing	10	8	9	4	5	6	3	5	5	6	5	5	Ret	4	4	6	6	5	4	4	5	Ret	Ret	6	191
4	(Serbia) NV Racing	Ret	12	WD	5	DNS	DNS										7	7	Ret							3
Pos	Driver	R1	R2	R3	R1	R2	R3	R1	R2	R3	R1	R2	R3	R1	R2	R3	R1	R2	R3	R1	R2	R3	R1	R2	R3	Pts
Pos	Driver	PRT (Portugal)			SPA (Belgium)			HOC (Germany)			HUN (Hungary)			LEC (France)			RBR (Austria)			CAT (Spain)			MNZ (Italy)			Pts
