= Yevan David =

Sri Lankan racing driver (born 2007)

- යෙවාන් ඩේවිඩ්
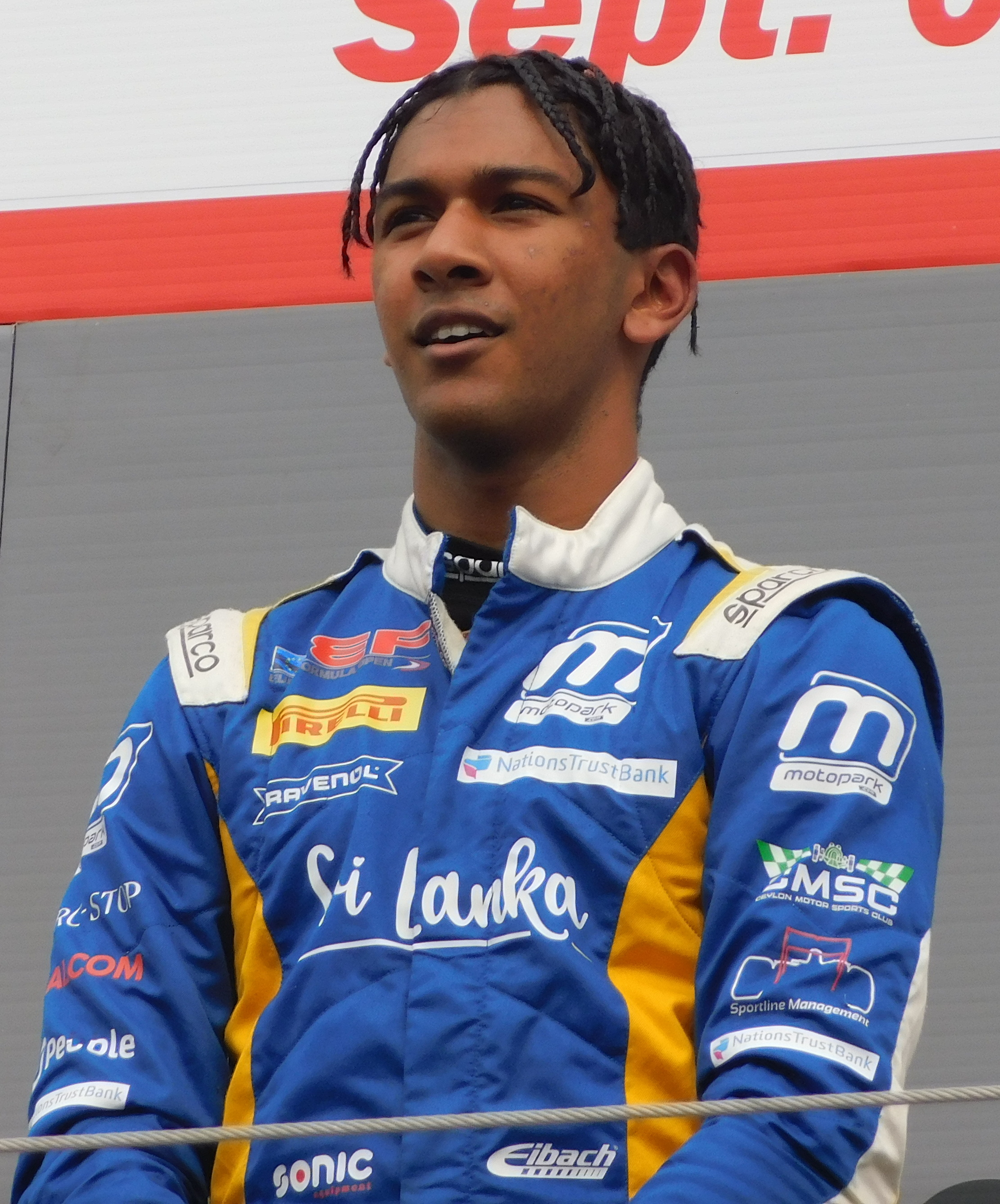
- David in 2025
- Born: 11 July 2007 (age 19); Romford, London, England
- Nationality: (Sri Lanka) Sri Lankan

FIA Formula 3 Championship career
- Debut season: 2026
- Current team: Van Amersfoort Racing
- Car number: TBA
- Former teams: AIX Racing
- Starts: 19
- Wins: 0
- Podiums: 1
- Poles: 0
- Fastest laps: 0
- Best finish: 18th in 2026

Previous series
- 2026; 2025; 2024–2025; 2024; 2024; 2024: FR Oceania; GB3; Euroformula Open; Eurocup-3; F4 Spanish; F4 UAE
- Statistics up to date as of 15 September 2026.

Yevan David (Sinhala: යෙවාන් ඩේවිඩ්; born 11 July 2007) is a Sri Lankan racing driver who is set to compete in the FIA Formula 3 Championship for Van Amersfoort Racing.

Born in London and raised in Singapore, David is the 2025 Euroformula Open vice-champion, driving for Team Motopark.

== Early life ==
David was born on 11 July 2007 in Romford, London, England, to Sri Lankan parents Yohan David and Roshika Ranasinghe. The family moved to Singapore when David was four years old. He grew up in Singapore, where he was educated at a local primary school before joining Chatsworth International School aged eight. David's grandfathers Paramesh David and Nirmal Ranasinghe were both involved in motor racing in Sri Lanka. His first racing experience was in 2014, when he went rental karting with his father at the Sri Lanka Karting Circuit near Moratuwa.

== Racing career ==
=== Karting (2015–2023) ===
David was given a go-kart in 2015 and began racing in Singapore, aged seven. He also raced in Malaysia and Macau; in 2017, he won the IAME Asia Series in X30 Cadet. In 2018, he won the X30 Asia Cup at the Sri Lanka Circuit.

=== Formula 4 (2024) ===
David made his single-seater debut in the 2024 Formula 4 UAE Championship with Saintéloc Racing; he scored no points and placed twenty-sixth in the standings, with a best finish of thirteenth at Dubai and Yas Marina. His main campaign was in the F4 Spanish Championship, where he contested all bar the final round as he clinched nineteenth overall with a best finish of seventh at Jarama and Aragón. He then represented Sri Lanka in the FIA Motorsport Games F4 Cup: taking pole position in qualifying, he dropped to third in the qualification race after a battle with Andrés Cárdenas of Peru. He maintained third on-the-road in the medal race before his demotion to eleventh with track limits penalties.

=== Formula 3 (2024–present) ===
==== 2024: Debut in Eurocup-3 and Euroformula Open ====
David debuted in Formula Three with Saintéloc as he replaced the injured Finley Green in the fifth round of Eurocup-3 at Zandvoort, where he finished tenth and seventh. He further contested the final round of the Euroformula Open Championship at Monza with Motopark as a guest driver; David took his maiden junior formulae victories in the first and third races, with a third-placed finish in race two.

==== 2025: Euroformula Open vice-champion and GB3 debut ====
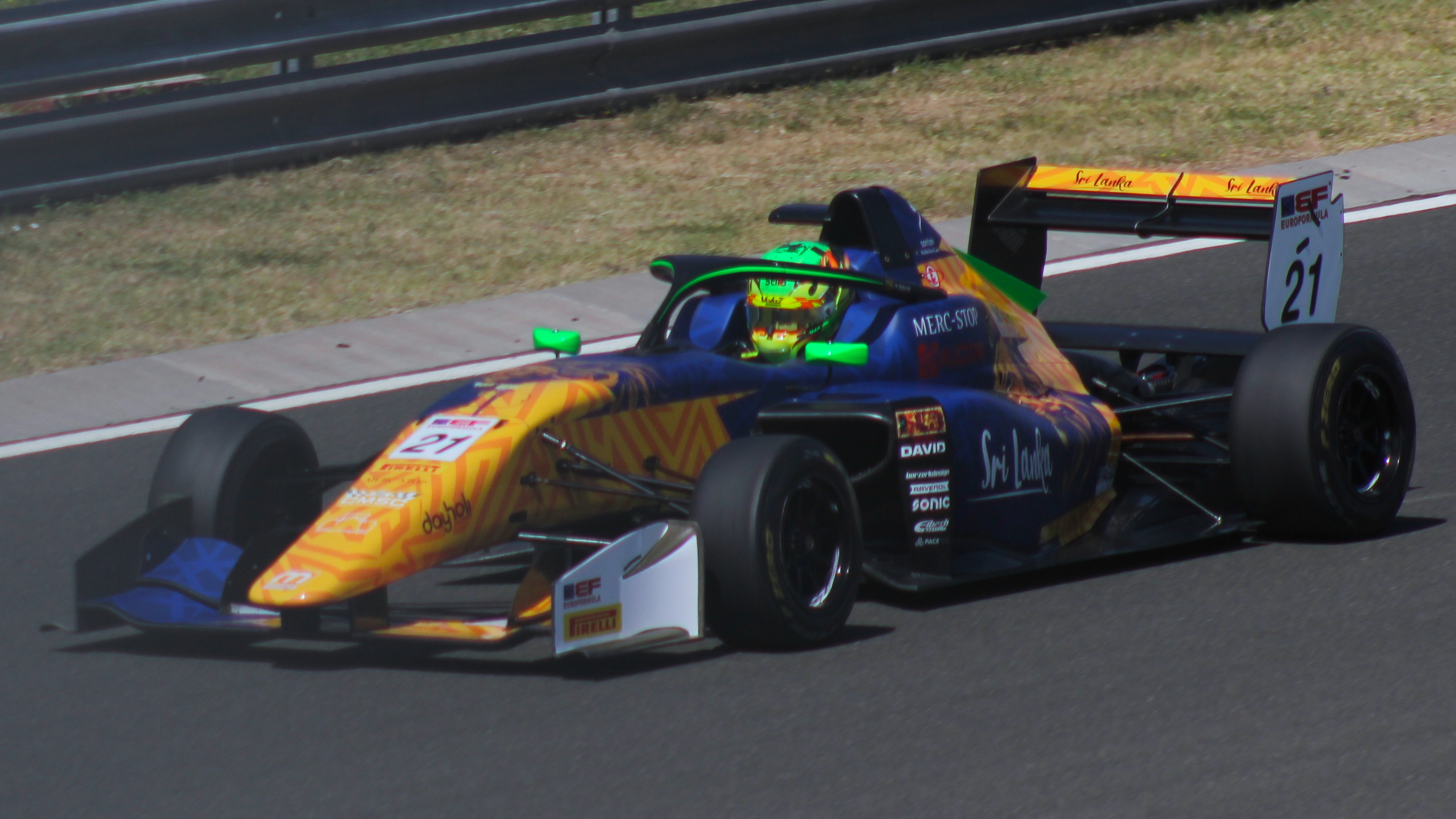
David at the Euroformula Open 2025

David progressed to compete full-time in Euroformula Open in 2025, remaining with Motopark.

That year, David also made his GB3 debut in the fifth round at Silverstone with Xcel Motorsport.

==== 2026: Rookie season in FIA Formula 3 ====
In the winter, David would race in the Formula Regional Oceania Trophy with Kiwi Motorsport.

David progressed to FIA Formula 3 in 2026 with AIX, becoming the first Sri Lankan to enter the series.

==== 2027 ====
David will remain in Formula 3 in 2027 and move to Van Amersfoort Racing.

== Karting record ==
=== Karting career summary ===
Season	Series	Team	Position
2015	Asian Open Championship — Mini ROK	Kartmaster Drakkar	
2017	IAME International Final — X30 Mini		16th
2018	Australian Championship — Cadet 12		48th
2018	ROK Cup Asia — Mini ROK	BMS-G51	4th
2019	Australian Championship — KA2		47th
2019	Asian Open Championship — F125 Junior	Stratos Motorsport	5th
2019	Australian Championship — Cadet 12		11th
2019	IAME Series Asia — X30 Cadet	Startos G51	13th
2019	IAME Asia Cup — X30 Cadet	Startos G51	10th
2019	IAME Series Asia — X30 Junior	Startos G51	15th
2019	IAME Asia Final — X30 Junior	Startos G51	10th
2019	RMC Grand Finals — Junior Max	Stratos Motorsport	45th
2020	IAME Winter Cup — X30 Junior	Strawberry Racing	17th
2020	IAME Asia Cup — X30 Junior	Stratos Motorsport	4th
2021	WSK Super Master Series — OK-J	Forza Racing	39th
2021	WSK Euro Series — OK-J		23rd
2021	WSK Open Cup — OK-J		39th
2021	CIK-FIA Academy Trophy		6th
2021	Champions of the Future — OK-J		20th
2021	CIK-FIA European Championship — OK-J		17th
2022	RMC Asia Festival — Senior Max	Stratos	9th
2022	Champions of the Future Winter Series — OK	Birel ART	24th
2022	FIA Motorsport Games Sprint Cup — Junior	Sri Lanka	2nd
2022	South Garda Winter Cup — KZ2		27th
2022	CIK-FIA European Championship — OK	Birel ART Racing	44th
2023	WSK Champions Cup — KZ2	CPB Sport	8th
2023	WSK Super Master Series — KZ2	CPB Sport	21st
2023	CIK-FIA World Cup — KZ2	CPB Sport	19th
2023	CIK-FIA European Championship — KZ2	CPB Sport	20th
2023	WSK Open Cup — KZ2	CPB Sport	39th

== Racing record ==
=== Racing career summary ===
Season	Series	Team	Races	Wins	Poles	F/Laps	Podiums	Points	Position
2024	Formula 4 UAE Championship	Saintéloc Racing	15	0	0	0	0	0	26th
2024	F4 Spanish Championship	Saintéloc Racing	18	0	0	0	0	12	19th
2024	Eurocup-3	Saintéloc Racing	2	0	0	0	0	7	19th
2024	Euroformula Open Championship	Team Motopark	3	2	0	0	3	0	NC†
2024	FIA Motorsport Games Formula 4 Cup	Team Sri Lanka	2	0	1	0	1	N/A	11th
2025	Euroformula Open Championship	Team Motopark	24	6	3	2	14	345	**2nd**
2025	GB3 Championship	Xcel Motorsport	3	0	0	0	0	15	33rd
2026	Formula Regional Oceania Trophy	Kiwi Motorsport	15	0	0	0	0	152	10th
2026	FIA Formula 3 Championship	AIX Racing	19	0	0	0	1	35	18th
2027	FIA Formula 3 Championship	Van Amersfoort Racing	0	0	0	0	0	0	TBD

^{*} Season still in progress.

† As David was a guest driver, he was ineligible for points.

=== Complete Formula 4 UAE Championship results ===
(key) (Races in bold indicate pole position; races in italics indicate fastest lap)

Year	Team	1	2	3	4	5	6	7	8	9	10	11	12	13	14	15	DC	Points
2024	Saintéloc Racing	YMC1; 1; 14	YMC1; 2; 19	YMC1; 3; 11	YMC2; 1; 22	YMC2; 2; 18	YMC2; 3; 16	DUB1; 1; 16	DUB1; 2; 16	DUB1; 3; 13	YMC3; 1; 16	YMC3; 2; 27†	YMC3; 3; 13	DUB2; 1; 19	DUB2; 2; 15	DUB2; 3; 14	26th	0

=== Complete F4 Spanish Championship results ===
(key) (Races in bold indicate pole position; races in italics indicate fastest lap)

Year	Team	1	2	3	4	5	6	7	8	9	10	11	12	13	14	15	16	17	18	19	20	21	DC	Points
2024	Saintéloc Racing	JAR; 1; 15	JAR; 2; 15	JAR; 3; 7	POR; 1; 13	POR; 2 Ret	POR; 3; 31	LEC; 1; 28	LEC; 2 Ret	LEC; 3; 13	ARA; 1; 23	ARA; 2; 21	ARA; 3; 7	CRT; 1; 18	CRT; 2; 18	CRT; 3; 21	JER; 1; 15	JER; 2; 31	JER; 3; 21	CAT; 1	CAT; 2	CAT; 3	19th	12

=== Complete Eurocup-3 results ===
(key) (Races in bold indicate pole position; races in italics indicate fastest lap)

Year	Team	1	2	3	4	5	6	7	8	9	10	11	12	13	14	15	16	17	DC	Points
2024	Saintéloc Racing	SPA; 1	SPA; 2	RBR; 1	RBR; 2	POR; 1	POR; 2	POR; 3	LEC; 1	LEC; 2	ZAN; 1; 10	ZAN; 2; 7	ARA; 1	ARA; 2	JER; 1	JER; 2	CAT; 1	CAT; 2	19th	7

=== Complete Euroformula Open Championship results ===
(key) (Races in bold indicate pole position) (Races in italics indicate fastest lap)

Year	Team	1	2	3	4	5	6	7	8	9	10	11	12	13	14	15	16	17	18	19	20	21	22	23	24	DC	Points
2024	Team Motopark	PRT; 1	PRT; 2	PRT; 3	HOC; 1	HOC; 2	HOC; 3	SPA; 1	SPA; 2	SPA; 3	HUN; 1	HUN; 2	HUN; 3	LEC; 1	LEC; 2	LEC; 3	RBR; 1	RBR; 2	RBR; 3	CAT; 1	CAT; 2	CAT; 3	MNZ; 1; 1	MNZ; 2; 3	MNZ; 3; 1	NC†	0
2025	Team Motopark	PRT; 1; 3	PRT; 2; 1	PRT; 3; 1	**SPA**; **1**; 1	SPA; 2; 4	SPA; 3; 2	HOC; 1; 10	HOC; 2; 3	HOC; 3; 1	HUN; 1; 8	HUN; 2; 3	HUN; 3; 4	LEC; 1; 2	LEC; 2; 12	LEC; 3; 10	RBR; 1; 6	RBR; 2; 1	RBR; 3; 11	**CAT**; **1**; 2	CAT; 2; 2	CAT; 3; 5	**MNZ**; **1**; 6	MNZ; 2; 2	MNZ; 3; 1	2nd	345

^{†} As David was a guest driver, he was ineligible for points.

=== Complete FIA Motorsport Games results ===
Year	Entrant	Competition	Qualifying	Quali race	Main race
2024	Team Sri Lanka	Formula 4 Cup	1st	3rd	11th

=== Complete GB3 Championship results ===
(key) (Races in bold indicate pole position) (Races in italics indicate fastest lap)

Year	Team	1	2	3	4	5	6	7	8	9	10	11	12	13	14	15	16	17	18	19	20	21	22	23	24	DC	Points
2025	Xcel Motorsport	SIL1; 1	SIL1; 2	SIL1; 3	ZAN; 1	ZAN; 2	ZAN; 3	SPA; 1	SPA; 2	SPA; 3	HUN; 1	HUN; 2	HUN; 3	SIL2; 1; 17	SIL2; 2; 10	SIL2; 3; 19	BRH; 1	BRH; 2	BRH; 3	DON; 1	DON; 2	DON; 3	MNZ; 1	MNZ; 2	MNZ; 3	33rd	15

=== Complete Formula Regional Oceania Trophy results ===
(key) (Races in bold indicate pole position) (Races in italics indicate fastest lap)

Year	Team	1	2	3	4	5	6	7	8	9	10	11	12	13	14	15	16	DC	Points
2026	Kiwi Motorsport	HMP; 1; 8	HMP; 2; 6	HMP; 3; 7	HMP; 4 Ret	TAU; 1; 11	TAU; 2; 18	TAU; 3; 8	TAU; 4; 13	TER; 1 Ret	TER; 2; 9	TER; 3 C	TER; 4; 5	HIG; 1; 8	HIG; 2; 9	HIG; 3; 9	HIG; 4; 13	10th	152

=== Complete FIA Formula 3 Championship results ===
(key) (Races in bold indicate pole position) (Races in italics indicate fastest lap)

Year	Entrant	1	2	3	4	5	6	7	8	9	10	11	12	13	14	15	16	17	18	19	20	DC	Points
2026	AIX Racing	MEL; SPR; 22	MEL; FEA; 21	MON; SPR; 21	MON; FEA; 20	CAT; SPR; 19	CAT; FEA; 27	RBR; SPR; 19	RBR; FEA; Ret	SIL; SPR; 2	SIL; FEA; 7	SPA; SPR; 16	SPA; FEA; Ret	HUN; SPR; 11	HUN; FEA; 23	MNZ; SPR; 4	MNZ; FEA; 4	MAD; SPR; 16	MAD; FEA1; 11	MAD; FEA2; 10		18th	35
2027	Van Amersfoort Racing	BHR; SPR	BHR; FEA	JED; SPR	JED; FEA	MEL; SPR	MEL; FEA	MTL; SPR	MTL; FEA	MON; SPR	MON; FEA	SIL; SPR	SIL; FEA	RBR; SPR	RBR; FEA	MNZ; SPR	MNZ; FEA	MAD; SPR	MAD; FEA	IST; SPR	IST; FEA	TBD	TBD
