= Enea Frey =

Swiss racing driver (born 2008)

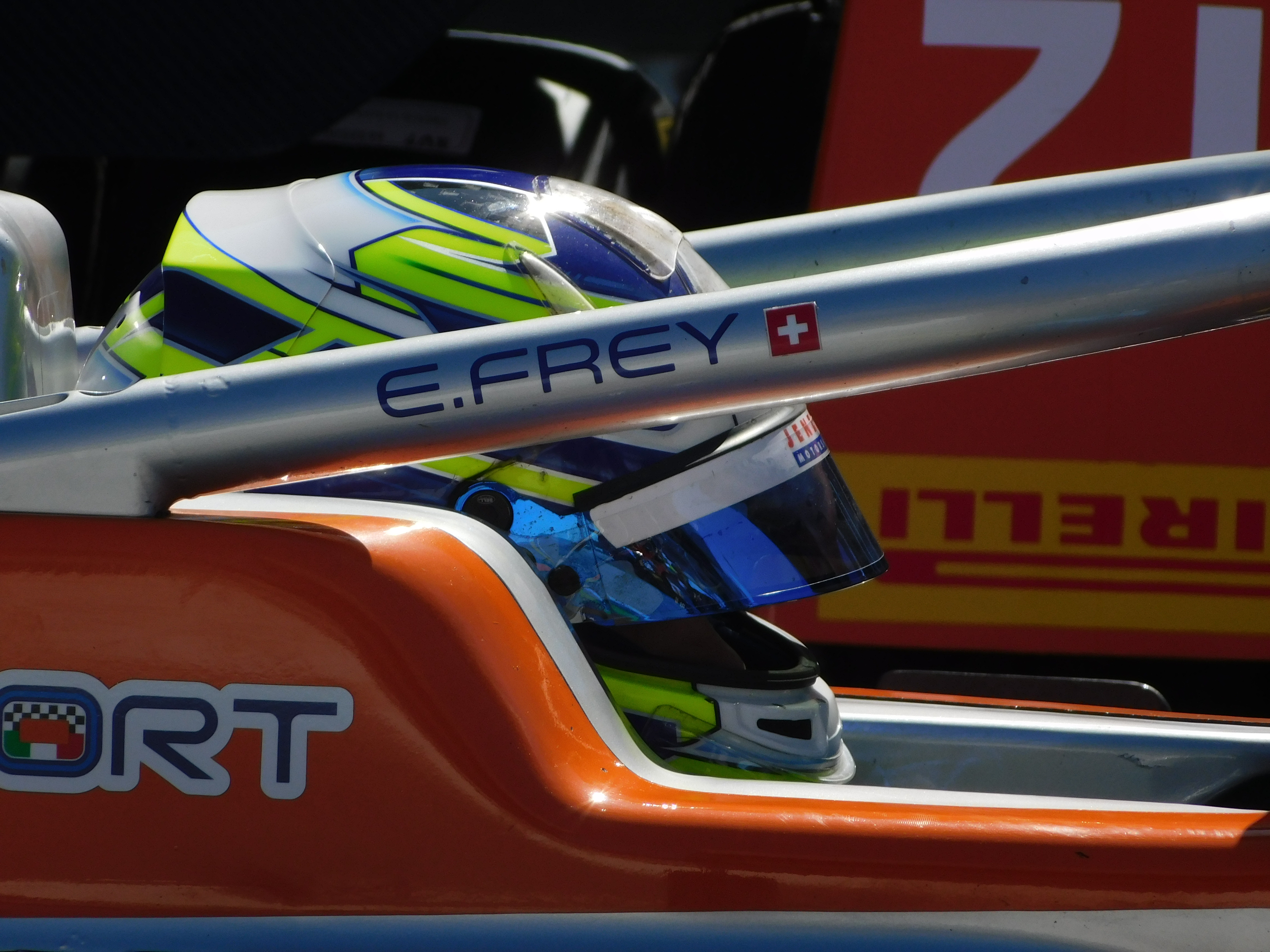
- Frey in 2025
- Nationality: (Switzerland) Swiss
- Born: 9 October 2008 (age 18) Auenstein, Aargau, Switzerland
- Relatives: Michel Frey (father)

Formula Regional European Championship career
- Debut season: 2025
- Car number: 8
- Former teams: CL Motorsport
- Starts: 9
- Wins: 0
- Podiums: 0
- Poles: 0
- Fastest laps: 0
- Best finish: 25th in 2025

Previous series
- 2026 2024 2024–2025 2024–2025 2024–2025: FR Middle East Trophy; F4 CEZ; Euro 4 / E4; Italian F4; Formula Winter Series
- Statistics up to date as of 14 September 2026.

Enea Dion Frey (born 9 October 2008) is a Swiss racing driver who last competed in the LMP3 class of the Le Mans Cup for Vector Sport RLR.

== Early life ==
Frey was born on 9 October 2008 in Auenstein, a municipality in the canton of Aargau, Switzerland. His father, Michel Frey, is a former sportscar racer who competed in the 24 Hours of Le Mans three times between 2011 and 2014 for his Race Performance team.

== Career ==
=== Karting (2017–2023) ===
Frey made his karting debut in 2017. In his first year of karts, he finished second to René Lammers in the seventh edition of the Summer Trophy in the Mini Gr3 class. Frey then spent a year in the Swiss karting championship, before joining Gamoto in 2019 to mainly race in WSK-organized series. Staying with Gamoto in 2020, Frey finished 13th in the WSK Champions Cup 60 Mini standings before taking 14th in the X30 Junior class of the Andrea Margutti Trophy later that year.

Frey then joined Ricky Flynn Motorsport in 2021 as he stepped up to OK-J, most notably finishing third at the Adria round in the WSK Euro Series on his way to tenth in points, while also taking ninth in the WSK Final Cup at the end of the year. In his second-to-last year in karting, Frey stepped up to OK during 2022, as he also joined Beyond Racing Team. After finishing 11th in the South Garda Winter Cup with them at the start of 2023, Frey switched to VDK Racing for the second half of 2023, taking a best result of 14th in the Karting World Championship at Lonato.

=== Formula 4 (2024–2025) ===
==== 2024 ====
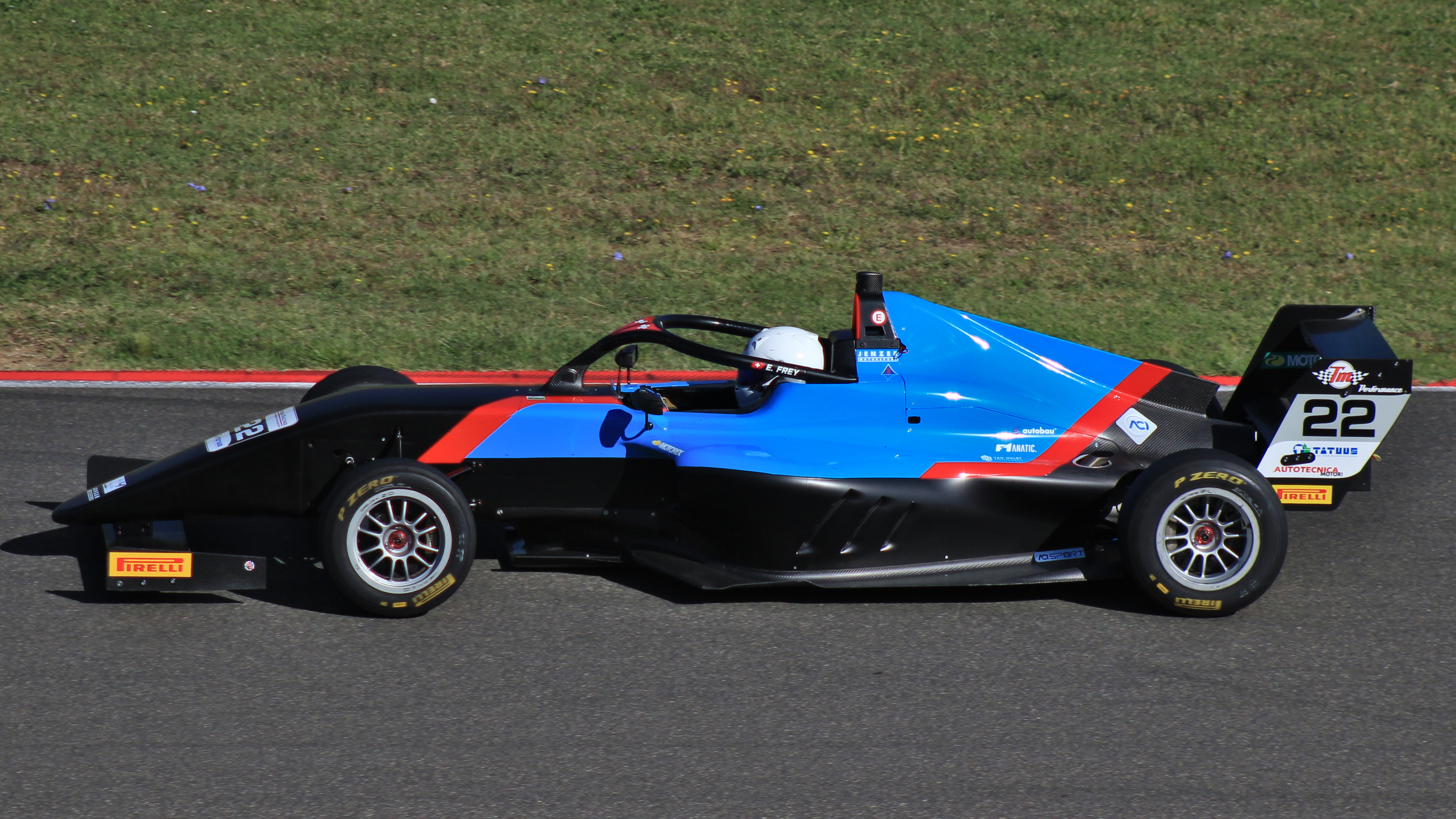
Frey driving at the Mugello Circuit during the 2024 Italian F4 Championship

Stepping up to single-seaters in 2024, Frey joined Jenzer Motorsport to race in Formula Winter Series and Italian F4. In the four-round winter championship, he scored his first points at the season-ending race at Barcelona, finishing eighth on his way to 25th in the overall standings. In his rookie season in Italian F4, Frey scored his first points at the fifth round at Le Castellet by finishing tenth in race two and taking his first rookie podium of the season. Frey then ended the weekend by finishing fifth in a wet-dry race three, which turned out to be his best result of the season as he scored points once more, taking tenth in race three at Barcelona on his way to 16th in points.

During 2024, Frey also competed in the Euro 4 Championship and made a one-off appearance in the Formula 4 CEZ Championship at the Red Bull Ring. In the former, Frey ended the season 17th with four points, all achieved in race three at Mugello, where he also finished third among the rookies. In the latter, Frey finished fourth in race one and three, whilst also taking fifth in race two.

==== 2025 ====
Frey remained with Jenzer Motorsport the following year to race in the Formula Winter Series. In his second season in the series, Frey scored points in all but four races and ended the winter ninth in points with a best result of fifth in the season-ending race at Barcelona. Continuing with Jenzer for the rest of 2025, Frey returned to both the Italian F4 and the E4 Championships. Racing in the first three rounds of the former, Frey scored a best result of sixth at Misano en route to a 20th-place points finish, whilst in the latter, Frey only partook in the Le Castellet round, finishing eighth in races two and three.

=== Formula Regional (2025–) ===
==== 2025 ====
During 2025, Frey made his debut in the Formula Regional European Championship, joining CL Motorsport ahead of the Red Bull Ring round. Racing in three of the final four rounds, Frey scored a best result of 13th in race one at Monza.

==== 2026 ====
At the beginning of 2026, Frey competed in the Formula Regional Middle East Trophy with CL Motorsport. In the four-round winter series, Frey scored a best result of 12th in race two at Dubai and ended the season 27th in the overall standings. Frey remained with CL Motorsport for the rest of the year to compete in the Formula Regional European Championship, but after taking a best result of 14th at the Red Bull Ring, he left the team and series.

=== Sportscar racing ===
For the rest of 2026, Frey switched to Vector Sport RLR to compete in the LMP3 class of the Le Mans Cup, scoring a best result of 15th in his four outings. Towards the end of the year, Frey partook in the European Le Mans Series rookie tests with Vector Sport in LMP2 machinery.

== Karting record ==
=== Karting career summary ===
Season	Series	Team	Position
2018	WSK Final Cup — 60 Mini	Spirit Racing	65th
2019	WSK Champions Cup — 60 Mini	Gamoto ASD	NC
2019	WSK Super Master Series — 60 Mini	Gamoto ASD	61st
2019	Andrea Margutti Trophy — 60 Mini	Gamoto ASD	NC
2019	WSK Euro Series — 60 Mini	Gamoto ASD	100th
2019	WSK Open Cup — 60 Mini	Gamoto ASD	43rd
2019	WSK Final Cup — 60 Mini	Gamoto ASD	NC
2020	WSK Champions Cup — 60 Mini	Gamoto ASD	13th
2020	Andrea Margutti Trophy — X30 Junior	Gamoto ASD	14th
2020	WSK Super Master Series — 60 Mini	Gamoto SNC	34th
2020	WSK Euro Series — 60 Mini	Gamoto SNC	28th
2021	WSK Champions Cup — OKJ	Gamoto ASD	NC
2021	WSK Super Master Series — OKJ	Gamoto ASD; Ricky Flynn Motorsport (Note: Frey competed for Gamoto ASD in Rounds 1-2 before switching to Ricky Flynn Motorsport for the final two rounds.)	76th
2021	WSK Euro Series — OKJ	Ricky Flynn Motorsport	10th
2021	Champions of the Future — OKJ	Ricky Flynn Motorsport	22nd
2021	CIK-FIA European Championship — OKJ	Ricky Flynn Motorsport	42nd
2021	WSK Open Cup — OKJ	Ricky Flynn Motorsport	25th
2021	CIK-FIA World Championship — OKJ	Ricky Flynn Motorsport	NC
2021	WSK Final Cup — OKJ	Ricky Flynn Motorsport	9th
2022	WSK Super Master Series — OKJ	Ricky Flynn Motorsport	20th
2022	Champions of the Future Winter Series — OKJ	Ricky Flynn Motorsport	24th
2022	Champions of the Future — OK	Ricky Flynn Motorsport	46th
2022	CIK-FIA European Championship — OKJ	Ricky Flynn Motorsport	46th
2022	Champions of the Future — OKJ	Beyond Racing Team	86th
2022	CIK-FIA European Championship — OK	Beyond Racing Team	91st
2022	WSK Euro Series — OK	Beyond Racing Team	65th
2022	CIK-FIA World Championship — OK	Beyond Racing Team	56th
2022	Italian ACI Championship — OK		20th
2023	28° South Garda Winter Cup — OK	Beyond Racing Team	11th
2023	WSK Champions Cup — OK	Beyond Racing Team	18th
2023	WSK Super Master Series — OK	Beyond Racing Team	33rd
2023	CIK-FIA European Championship — OK	Beyond Racing Team	112nd
2023	Champions of the Future — OK	Beyond Racing Team; VDK Racing (Note: Frey competed for Beyond Racing Team in Rounds 1-2 before switching to VDK Racing for the final three rounds.)	52nd
2023	IAME Euro Series — X30 Senior		120th
2023	CIK-FIA World Championship — OK	VDK Racing	14th
2023	WSK Final Cup — OK	VDK Racing	25th

== Racing record ==
=== Racing career summary ===
Season	Series	Team	Races	Wins	Poles	F/Laps	Podiums	Points	Position
2024	Formula Winter Series	Jenzer Motorsport	11	0	0	0	0	4	25th
2024	Italian F4 Championship	Jenzer Motorsport	21	0	0	0	0	12	16th
2024	Formula 4 CEZ Championship	Jenzer Motorsport	3	0	0	0	0	36	15th
2024	Euro 4 Championship	Jenzer Motorsport	9	0	0	0	0	4	17th
2025	Formula Winter Series	Jenzer Motorsport	12	0	0	0	0	56	9th
2025	Italian F4 Championship	Jenzer Motorsport	14	0	0	0	0	25	20th
2025	E4 Championship	Jenzer Motorsport	3	0	0	0	0	8	14th
2025	Formula Regional European Championship	CL Motorsport	6	0	0	0	0	0	25th
2026	Formula Regional Middle East Trophy	CL Motorsport	11	0	0	0	0	0	27th
2026	Formula Regional European Championship	CL Motorsport	3	0	0	0	0	0	34th
2026	Le Mans Cup – LMP3	Vector Sport RLR	4	0	0	0	0	0	39th

* Season still in progress.

=== Complete Formula Winter Series results ===
(key) (Races in bold indicate pole position; races in italics indicate fastest lap)

Year	Team	1	2	3	4	5	6	7	8	9	10	11	12	DC	Points
2024	Jenzer Motorsport	JER; 1; 33	JER; 2; 14	JER; 3; 31	CRT; 1; 15	CRT; 2; 21	CRT; 3; 17	ARA; 1; 24	ARA; 2; 13	ARA; 3; 15	CAT; 1 C	CAT; 2; 15	CAT; 3; 8	25th	4
2025	Jenzer Motorsport	POR; 1 Ret	POR; 2; 7	POR; 3; 6	CRT; 1; 8	CRT; 2; 12	CRT; 3; 6	ARA; 1; 7	ARA; 2; 15	ARA; 3; 7	CAT; 1; 7	CAT; 2; 25	CAT; 3; 5	9th	56

=== Complete Italian F4 Championship results ===
(key) (Races in bold indicate pole position; races in italics indicate fastest lap)

Year	Team	1	2	3	4	5	6	7	8	9	10	11	12	13	14	15	16	17	18	19	20	21	22	23	24	25	DC	Points
2024	Jenzer Motorsport	MIS; 1; 20	MIS; 2; 29†	MIS; 3 Ret	IMO; 1 Ret	IMO; 2; 18	IMO; 3; 14	VLL; 1; 26†	VLL; 2; 15	VLL; 3; 13	MUG; 1 Ret	MUG; 2 Ret	MUG; 3; 31†	LEC; 1 Ret	LEC; 2; 10	LEC; 3; 5	CAT; 1; 26†	CAT; 2 Ret	CAT; 3; 10	MNZ; 1; 13	MNZ; 2; 14	MNZ; 3 Ret					16th	12
2025	Jenzer Motorsport	MIS1; 1; 6	MIS1; 2; 10	MIS1; 3	MIS1; 4; 12	VLL; 1; 8	VLL; 2 Ret	VLL; 3	VLL; 4; 17	MNZ; 1 Ret	MNZ; 2; 8	MNZ; 3; 7	MUG; 1; 13	MUG; 2; 23	MUG; 3; 31	IMO; 1; 27	IMO; 2 C	IMO; 3; 9	CAT; 1	CAT; 2	CAT; 3	MIS2; 1	MIS2; 2	MIS2; 3	MIS2; 4	MIS2; 5	20th	25

=== Complete Formula 4 CEZ Championship results ===
(key) (Races in bold indicate pole position) (Races in italics indicate fastest lap)

Year	Team	1	2	3	4	5	6	7	8	9	10	11	12	13	14	15	16	17	18	DC	Points
2024	Jenzer Motorsport	BAL; 1	BAL; 2	BAL; 3	RBR; 1; 4	RBR; 2; 5	RBR; 3; 4	SVK; 1	SVK; 2	SVK; 3	MOS; 1	MOS; 2	MOS; 3	BRN; 1	BRN; 2	BRN; 3	SAL; 1	SAL; 2	SAL; 3	15th	36

=== Complete Euro 4/E4 Championship results ===
(key) (Races in bold indicate pole position; races in italics indicate fastest lap)

Year	Team	1	2	3	4	5	6	7	8	9	DC	Points
2024	Jenzer Motorsport	MUG; 1; 11	MUG; 2; 26†	MUG; 3; 8	RBR; 1; 13	RBR; 2; 19	RBR; 3; 13	MNZ; 1; 23†	MNZ; 2; 13	MNZ; 3; 19	17th	4
2025	Jenzer Motorsport	LEC; 1 Ret	LEC; 2; 8	LEC; 3; 8	MUG; 1	MUG; 2	MUG; 3	MNZ; 1	MNZ; 2	MNZ; 3	14th	8

=== Complete Formula Regional European Championship results ===
(key) (Races in bold indicate pole position) (Races in italics indicate fastest lap)

Year	Team	1	2	3	4	5	6	7	8	9	10	11	12	13	14	15	16	17	18	19	20	DC	Points
2025	CL Motorsport	MIS; 1	MIS; 2	SPA; 1	SPA; 2	ZAN; 1	ZAN; 2	HUN; 1	HUN; 2	LEC; 1	LEC; 2	IMO; 1	IMO; 2	RBR; 1 Ret	RBR; 2; 27†	CAT; 1	CAT; 2	HOC; 1; 22	HOC; 2; 19	MNZ; 1; 13	MNZ; 2 Ret	25th	0
2026	CL Motorsport	RBR; 1; 14	RBR; 2 Ret	RBR; 3; 23	ZAN; 1	ZAN; 2	SPA; 1	SPA; 2	SPA; 3	MNZ; 1	MNZ; 2	MNZ; 3	HUN; 1	HUN; 2	LEC; 1	LEC; 2	IMO; 1	IMO; 2	IMO; 3	HOC; 1	HOC; 2	34th	0

=== Complete Formula Regional Middle East Trophy results ===
(key) (Races in bold indicate pole position) (Races in italics indicate fastest lap)

Year	Entrant	1	2	3	4	5	6	7	8	9	10	11	12	DC	Points
2026	CL Motorsport	YMC1; 1; 27	YMC1; 2; 20	YMC1; 3 Ret	YMC2; 1; 23	YMC2; 2; 29†	YMC2; 3; 28	DUB; 1; 23	DUB; 2; 12	DUB; 3; 22	LUS; 1; 22	LUS; 2 C	LUS; 3 Ret	27th	0

=== Complete Le Mans Cup results ===
(key) (Races in bold indicate pole position; results in italics indicate fastest lap)

Year	Entrant	Class	Chassis	1	2	3	4	5	6	Rank	Points
2026	Vector Sport RLR	LMP3	Ligier JS P325	BAR	LEC	LMS; Ret	SPA; 15	SIL; 15	POR; Ret	39th	0
