= 2026 Formula Regional Middle East Trophy =

Motor racing championship

The 2026 Formula Regional Middle East Trophy was a multi-event Formula Regional open-wheel single seater motor racing championship. The championship featured a mix of professional and amateur drivers, competing in Formula Regional cars. Known since 2023 as the Formula Regional Middle East Championship, the series was rebranded under the Trophy guise after the FIA introduced a new concept for single-seater championships held over shorter, constrained timeframes. The change in guise coincided with a change in technical regulations, as the series switched to a new chassis and engine spec.

The championship was held over four rounds in January and February 2026. Kean Nakamura-Berta won the Drivers' Championship title at the final race of the season and in doing so also won the Rookie Cup and helped his team, the Mumbai Falcons Racing Limited, to defend their Teams' Championship title.

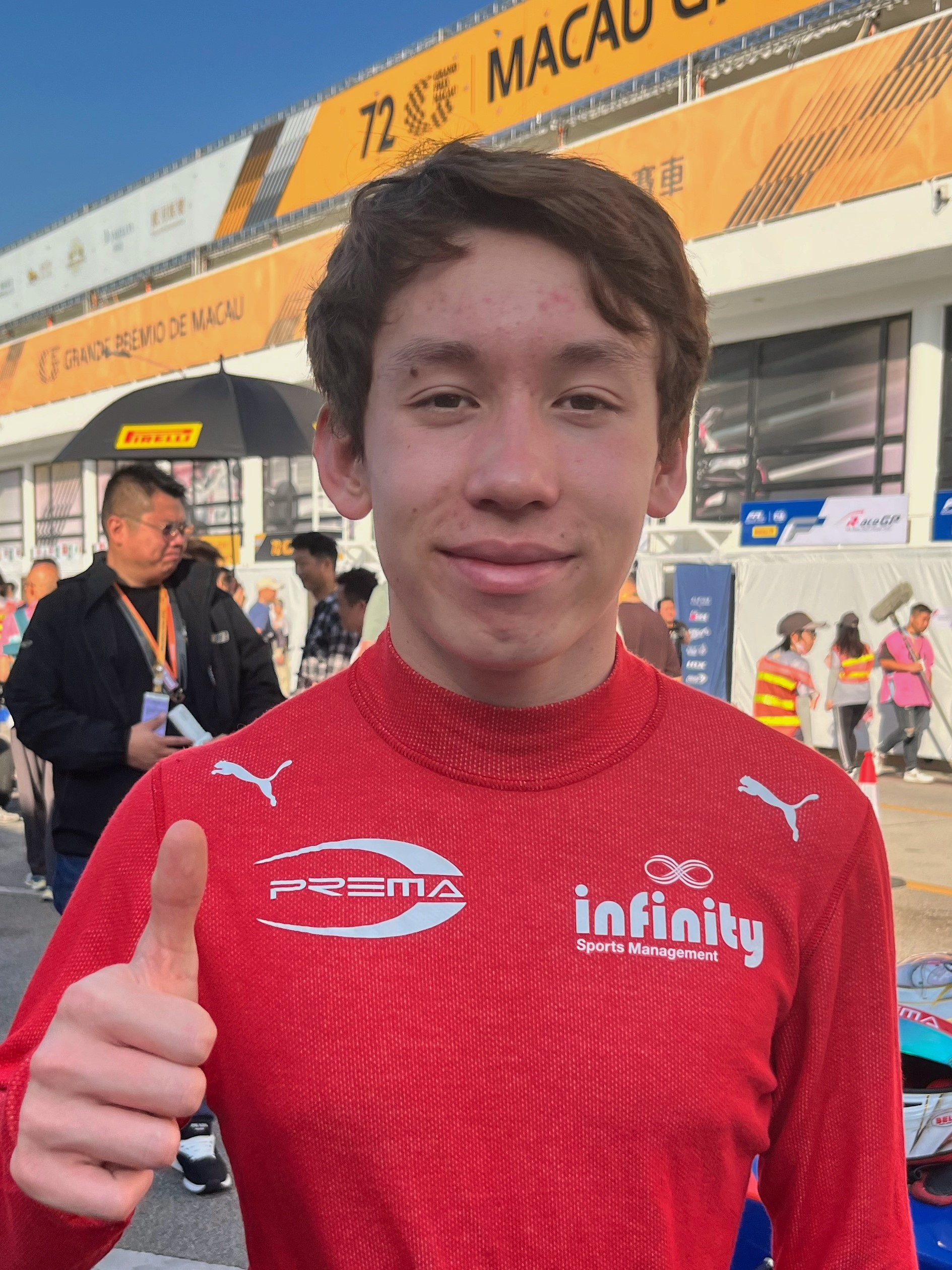
Mumbai Falcons driver Kean Nakamura-Berta won both the overall Drivers' Championship title and the Rookie Cup.

== Teams and drivers ==
The championship retired the Tatuus F3 T-318 chassis it had used since its inception and replaced it with the new Tatuus T-326, powered by a 1.6 litre, 3-cylinder Toyota engine running on Pirelli tires. The eleven teams competing in the 2026 season were announced on 12 December 2025.

Team	No.	Driver	Status	Rounds
(New Zealand) Rodin Motorsport	2	(Australia) Alex Ninovic		All
(New Zealand) Rodin Motorsport	4	(United Kingdom) Reza Seewooruthun		All
(New Zealand) Rodin Motorsport	18	(Germany) Maxim Rehm	R	All
(Italy) Trident	3	(Italy) Maximilian Popov (Note: Popov is Russian-Grenadian, but he competes under an Italian licence as Russian national emblems were banned by the FIA following the Russian invasion of Ukraine.)	R	All
(Italy) Trident	47	(Serbia) Andrija Kostić	R	All
(Italy) Trident	87	(United Kingdom) Kai Daryanani (Note: Daryanani is an Indian driver competing under a British licence.)		All
(Italy) RPM	5	(Brazil) Miguel Costa	R	All
(Italy) RPM	8	(Poland) Jan Przyrowski	R	All
(Italy) RPM	99	(Italy) Giovanni Maschio		All
(Italy) CL Motorsport	6	(Switzerland) Enea Frey	R	All
(Italy) CL Motorsport	28	(Italy) Zhenrui Chi (Note: Chi is a Chinese driver competing under an Italian licence.)		All
(Italy) CL Motorsport	57	(Kyrgyzstan) Michael Belov (Note: Belov and Severiukhin are Russian, but they compete under a Kyrgyz and a British licence, respectively, as Russian national emblems were banned by the FIA following the Russian invasion of Ukraine.)		1
(Italy) CL Motorsport	69	(Netherlands) Reno Francot	R	3–4
(France) ART Grand Prix	7	(Thailand) Tasanapol Inthraphuvasak		4
(France) ART Grand Prix	19	(Singapore) Kabir Anurag	R	All
(France) ART Grand Prix	27	(Monaco) Matteo Giaccardi	R	All
(France) ART Grand Prix	89	(Japan) Taito Kato		1–3
(Netherlands) Van Amersfoort Racing	11	(Portugal) Francisco Macedo		All
(Netherlands) Van Amersfoort Racing	55	(India) Dion Gowda		All
(Netherlands) Van Amersfoort Racing	68	(China) Yuhao Fu	R	All
(France) R-ace GP	12	(Japan) Yuki Sano		All
(France) R-ace GP	71	(United Arab Emirates) Rashid Al Dhaheri		All
(France) R-ace GP	73	(China) Gerrard Xie		1–2
(France) R-ace GP	73	(Italy) Emanuele Olivieri	R	3–4
(Switzerland) G4 Racing	14	(United Kingdom) Artem Severiukhin	R	All
(Switzerland) G4 Racing	24	(France) Jules Roussel	R	All
(Switzerland) G4 Racing	67	(France) Andrea Dupé	R	All
(Netherlands) MP Motorsport	15	(Kazakhstan) Alexander Abkhazava		All
(Netherlands) MP Motorsport	16	(Singapore) Christian Ho		1–2
(Netherlands) MP Motorsport	16	(Mexico) Jesse Carrasquedo Jr.		3–4
(Netherlands) MP Motorsport	17	(Brazil) Alceu Feldmann Neto		All
(Republic of Ireland) Pinnacle Motorsport	29	(United Arab Emirates) August Raber (Note: Raber is a Swedish driver competing under an Emirati licence.)	R	All
(Republic of Ireland) Pinnacle Motorsport	41	(United States) Alex Powell	R	All
(India) Mumbai Falcons Racing Limited	51	(United Kingdom) Kean Nakamura-Berta (Note: Nakamura-Berta is a Japanese-Slovak driver competing under a British licence.)	R	All
(India) Mumbai Falcons Racing Limited	88	(Colombia) Salim Hanna	R	All
(India) Mumbai Falcons Racing Limited	98	(United States) Sebastian Wheldon	R	All

Icon	Status
R	Rookie

== Calendar ==
The 2026 calendar was officially announced on 31 October 2025. The adoption of the Formula Regional Trophy format saw the number of race weekends reduced to four, with the series making two visits in Yas Marina Circuit, compared to three in the previous year.

Round		Circuit	Date	Support bill	Map of circuit locations
1	R1	(United Arab Emirates) Yas Marina Circuit, Yas Island (Grand Prix Circuit)	17 January	Gulf Radical Cup; UAE4 Series	2026 Formula Regional Middle East Trophy is located in Persian Gulf
1	R2	(United Arab Emirates) Yas Marina Circuit, Yas Island (Grand Prix Circuit)	18 January	Gulf Radical Cup; UAE4 Series	2026 Formula Regional Middle East Trophy is located in Persian Gulf
1	R3	(United Arab Emirates) Yas Marina Circuit, Yas Island (Grand Prix Circuit)	18 January	Gulf Radical Cup; UAE4 Series	2026 Formula Regional Middle East Trophy is located in Persian Gulf
2	R4	(United Arab Emirates) Yas Marina Circuit, Yas Island (Corkscrew Circuit)	24 January	UAE4 Series	2026 Formula Regional Middle East Trophy is located in Persian Gulf
2	R5	(United Arab Emirates) Yas Marina Circuit, Yas Island (Corkscrew Circuit)	25 January	UAE4 Series	2026 Formula Regional Middle East Trophy is located in Persian Gulf
2	R6	(United Arab Emirates) Yas Marina Circuit, Yas Island (Corkscrew Circuit)	25 January	UAE4 Series	2026 Formula Regional Middle East Trophy is located in Persian Gulf
3	R7	(United Arab Emirates) Dubai Autodrome, Dubai Motor City (Grand Prix Circuit)	30 January	Asian Le Mans Series; UAE4 Series	2026 Formula Regional Middle East Trophy is located in Persian Gulf
3	R8	(United Arab Emirates) Dubai Autodrome, Dubai Motor City (Grand Prix Circuit)	1 February	Asian Le Mans Series; UAE4 Series	2026 Formula Regional Middle East Trophy is located in Persian Gulf
3	R9	(United Arab Emirates) Dubai Autodrome, Dubai Motor City (Grand Prix Circuit)	1 February	Asian Le Mans Series; UAE4 Series	2026 Formula Regional Middle East Trophy is located in Persian Gulf
4	R10	(Qatar) Lusail International Circuit, Lusail (Grand Prix Circuit)	12 February	UAE4 Series	2026 Formula Regional Middle East Trophy is located in Persian Gulf
4	R11	(Qatar) Lusail International Circuit, Lusail (Grand Prix Circuit)	13 February	UAE4 Series	2026 Formula Regional Middle East Trophy is located in Persian Gulf
4	R12	(Qatar) Lusail International Circuit, Lusail (Grand Prix Circuit)	13 February	UAE4 Series	2026 Formula Regional Middle East Trophy is located in Persian Gulf

== Season report ==
The 2026 Formula Regional Middle East Trophy began with two race weekends at Yas Marina Circuit. MP Motorsport's Alexander Abkhazava and R-ace GP's Rashid Al Dhaheri shared pole positions in qualifying at the first weekend. The first race of the season began with Abkhazava keeping Al Dhaheri and Trident's Maximilian Popov behind at the start before winning a processional race with little changes in the order. The second race began with multiple cars stalling, among them Rodin's Reza Seewooruthun, who was then heavily hit by CL Motorsport's Michael Belov, causing a red flag. Trident's Andrija Kostić led the restart before being handed a drive-through penalty, which handed the lead to RPM's Miguel Costa before MP's Christian Ho overtook him to claim victory. Rodin's Alex Ninovic took third, before stalling off the front row in race three. That allowed Al Dhaheri to pull away, leading Pinnacle's Alex Powell and Ho through a second red flag-interrupted race to take his maiden Formula Regional victory and the lead in the standings.

Round two used Yas Marina's corkscrew layout, and pole positions in qualifying were claimed by the Mumbai Falcons pair of Kean Nakamura-Berta and Sebastian Wheldon. Al Dhaheri moved past Nakamura-Berta at the start of the opening race as Powell slotted into third. The race was red-flagged with five laps to go after contact between MP’s Alceu Feldmann Neto and VAR’s Yuhao Fu saw the Brazilian's car flipped upside down, but the order at the top remained static. Ninovic started race two on reverse-grid pole position, with most drivers starting on wet tyres after pre-race rain. He lost the lead to RPM's Jan Przyrowski at the start, but was able to regain it on lap five. He then gapped Przyrowski and Popov before the race finished under safety car. Race three saw Al Dhaheri once again move past the polesitter at the start, with Wheldon also losing out to Nakamura-Berta one corner later. Al Dhaheri remained faultless throughout two safety car periods to claim victory and grow his championship lead to 35 points over Nakamura-Berta.

The Dubai Autodrome hosted round three, where ART Grand Prix driver Taito Kato and Powell shared pole positions in qualifying. Defensive driving at the start of the opening race saw Kato hold off Abkhazava, while Nakamura-Berta fended off Al Dhaheri. The top four positions remained static, handing Kato his maiden Formula Regional win. Powell started the second race form reversed-grid pole position ahead of Mumbai Falcons driver Salim Hanna, but a bad start saw him drop to fourth exiting the opening corner. Hanna claimed the lead ahead of Ninovic and Przyrowski and led throughout two safety car interruptions to take victory. Powell crashed and retired, with subsequent repairs forcing him to miss race three. With R-ace GP's Yuki Sano also missing the race, Abkhazava had a clear road ahead despite originally qualifying third. He had to fend off Nakamura-Berta multiple times before being able to take the win. R-ace GP's Emanuele Olivieri came third, with Al Dhaheri not scoring and his lead over Nakamura-Berta reduced to 24 points.

The final round was held at Lusail International Circuit, and it began with disruptions. Engine drive belt defects for multiple drivers in free practice prompted organizers to order spare parts from Europe. That saw the schedule reduced to just two races, with the reversed-grid race cancelled. When qualifying came around, championship chaser Nakamura-Berta was the man to beat as he claimed both pole positions. Poor starts to the first race for Powell and Al Dhaheri saw Wheldon and Przyrowski move past them into the podium positions. After initial attacks by Wheldon, positions stabilized and Nakamura-Berta took victory. With Al Dhaheri finishing sixth, the gap in the championship was reduced to just seven points. Race two saw Nakamura-Berta able to stay in first as Wheldon and Powell fought over second place. A safety car followed after multiple incidents further down the field. Nakamura-Berta had a faultless restart and a trouble-free rest of the race, which, coupled with a seventh-place finish for Al Dhaheri, saw him claim the championship title by 12 points.

== Race results ==
Round		Circuit	Pole position	Fastest lap	Winning driver	Winning team	Rookie winner
1	R1	(United Arab Emirates) Yas Marina Circuit (Grand Prix Circuit)	(Kazakhstan) Alexander Abkhazava	(United Kingdom) Kean Nakamura-Berta	(Kazakhstan) Alexander Abkhazava	(Netherlands) MP Motorsport	(Italy) Maximilian Popov
1	R2	(United Arab Emirates) Yas Marina Circuit (Grand Prix Circuit)		(Singapore) Christian Ho	(Singapore) Christian Ho	(Netherlands) MP Motorsport	(Brazil) Miguel Costa
1	R3	(United Arab Emirates) Yas Marina Circuit (Grand Prix Circuit)	(United Arab Emirates) Rashid Al Dhaheri	(United Arab Emirates) Rashid Al Dhaheri	(United Arab Emirates) Rashid Al Dhaheri	(France) R-ace GP	(United States) Alex Powell
2	R4	(United Arab Emirates) Yas Marina Circuit (Corkscrew Circuit)	(United Kingdom) Kean Nakamura-Berta	(United Arab Emirates) Rashid Al Dhaheri	(United Arab Emirates) Rashid Al Dhaheri	(France) R-ace GP	(United Kingdom) Kean Nakamura-Berta
2	R5	(United Arab Emirates) Yas Marina Circuit (Corkscrew Circuit)		(United States) Alex Powell	(Australia) Alex Ninovic	(New Zealand) Rodin Motorsport	(Poland) Jan Przyrowski
2	R6	(United Arab Emirates) Yas Marina Circuit (Corkscrew Circuit)	(United States) Sebastian Wheldon	(United Arab Emirates) Rashid Al Dhaheri	(United Arab Emirates) Rashid Al Dhaheri	(France) R-ace GP	(United Kingdom) Kean Nakamura-Berta
3	R7	(United Arab Emirates) Dubai Autodrome (Grand Prix Circuit)	(Japan) Taito Kato	(United Kingdom) Kean Nakamura-Berta	(Japan) Taito Kato	(France) ART Grand Prix	(United Kingdom) Kean Nakamura-Berta
3	R8	(United Arab Emirates) Dubai Autodrome (Grand Prix Circuit)		(Italy) Maximilian Popov	(Colombia) Salim Hanna	(India) Mumbai Falcons Racing Limited	(Colombia) Salim Hanna
3	R9	(United Arab Emirates) Dubai Autodrome (Grand Prix Circuit)	(United States) Alex Powell	(United Kingdom) Kean Nakamura-Berta	(Kazakhstan) Alexander Abkhazava	(Netherlands) MP Motorsport	(United Kingdom) Kean Nakamura-Berta
4	R10	(Qatar) Lusail International Circuit (Grand Prix Circuit)	(United Kingdom) Kean Nakamura-Berta	(United States) Sebastian Wheldon	(United Kingdom) Kean Nakamura-Berta	(India) Mumbai Falcons Racing Limited	(United Kingdom) Kean Nakamura-Berta
4	R11	(Qatar) Lusail International Circuit (Grand Prix Circuit)		Race cancelled due to issues with spec engine parts requiring replacement			
4	R12	(Qatar) Lusail International Circuit (Grand Prix Circuit)	(United Kingdom) Kean Nakamura-Berta	(Italy) Emanuele Olivieri	(United Kingdom) Kean Nakamura-Berta	(India) Mumbai Falcons Racing Limited	(United Kingdom) Kean Nakamura-Berta

== Championship standings ==
=== Scoring system ===
Points were awarded to the top ten classified finishers as follows:

Position	**1st**	**2nd**	**3rd**	**4th**	**5th**	**6th**	**7th**	**8th**	**9th**	**10th**
Points	25	18	15	12	10	8	6	4	2	1

=== Drivers' Championship ===
Pos	Driver	YMC1 (United Arab Emirates)			YMC2 (United Arab Emirates)			DUB (United Arab Emirates)			LUS (Qatar)			Pts
Pos	Driver	R1	R2	R3	R4	R5	R6	R7	R8	R9	R10	R11	R12	Pts
1	(United Kingdom) Kean Nakamura-Berta	4	Ret	5	**2**	5	2	3	Ret	2	**1**	C	**1**	151
2	(United Arab Emirates) Rashid Al Dhaheri	2	5	**1**	1	15	1	4	5	16	6	C	7	139
3	(Kazakhstan) Alexander Abkhazava	**1**	6	17	10	Ret	4	2	7	1	26	C	Ret	95
4	(United States) Alex Powell	6	23	2	3	28	6	12	Ret	**DNS**	4	C	3	76
5	(United States) Sebastian Wheldon	31	21	14	7	4	**3**	Ret	17	9	2	C	2	71
6	(Poland) Jan Przyrowski	14	26	13	11	2	14	10	3	4	3	C	5	71
7	(Italy) Maximilian Popov	3	8	6	8	3	Ret	5	4	23	9	C	11	70
8	(Australia) Alex Ninovic	7	3	18	12	1	13	9	2	26	15	C	18	66
9	(Singapore) Kabir Anurag	22	14	4	6	6	5	16	9	20	5	C	4	62
10	(Colombia) Salim Hanna	15	4	20	24	21	12	11	1	6	10	C	6	54
11	(Japan) Taito Kato	5	Ret	DNS	14	11	8	**1**	11	5				49
12	(Singapore) Christian Ho	8	1	3	17	22	11							44
13	(Japan) Yuki Sano	24	13	10	4	8	7	6	Ret	DNS	8	C	9	37
14	(Italy) Emanuele Olivieri							7	Ret	3	7	C	8	31
15	(Brazil) Miguel Costa	10	2	Ret	16	7	10	22	15	14	17	C	10	27
16	(Italy) Zhenrui Chi	17	9	7	21	13	23	8	6	27	25	C	19	20
17	(Kyrgyzstan) Artem Severiukhin	13	16	9	5	27	9	28	22	18	12	C	Ret	14
18	(Portugal) Francisco Macedo	16	7	22	9	12	22	13	25†	8	21	C	14	12
19	(France) Jules Roussel	26	18	19	18	10	16	17	14	7	16	C	15	7
20	(Germany) Maxim Rehm	9	27	Ret	27	16	17	18	8	27	Ret	C	DNS	6
21	(Serbia) Andrija Kostić	12	Ret	8	DSQ	20	20	21	20	13	19	C	21	4
22	(United Kingdom) Reza Seewooruthun	11	Ret	DNS	29†	9	21	Ret	Ret	15	24	C	23	2
23	(France) Andrea Dupé	20	11	23	15	26	15	14	10	11	13	C	20	1
24	(India) Dion Gowda	23	12	11	22	17	Ret	15	DNS	10	23	C	17	1
25	(China) Gerrard Xie	21	10	12	13	19	19							1
26	(Mexico) Jesse Carrasquedo Jr.							Ret	19	12	11	C	DSQ	0
27	(Switzerland) Enea Frey	27	20	Ret	23	29†	28	23	12	22	22	C	Ret	0
28	(Thailand) Tasanapol Inthraphuvasak										28	C	12	0
29	(Netherlands) Reno Francot							20	13	29†	14	C	22	0
30	(Monaco) Matteo Giaccardi	29	24	21	26	14	25	27	Ret	25	27	C	13	0
31	(China) Yuhao Fu	30	22	15	28	18	26	24	16	24	31	C	26	0
32	(Italy) Giovanni Maschio	25	15	Ret	19	23	24	Ret	24	21	30	C	24	0
33	(United Kingdom) Kai Daryanani	19	17	24†	25	25	18	19	18	17	18	C	16	0
34	(Brazil) Alceu Feldmann Neto	32	25	16	Ret	Ret	29	25	23	Ret	29	C	Ret	0
35	(United Arab Emirates) Michael Belov	18	Ret	DNS										0
36	(United Arab Emirates) August Raber	28	19	Ret	20	24	27	26	21	19	20	C	25	0
Pos	Driver	R1	R2	R3	R4	R5	R6	R7	R8	R9	R10	R11	R12	Pts
Pos	Driver	YMC1 (United Arab Emirates)			YMC2 (United Arab Emirates)			DUB (United Arab Emirates)			LUS (Qatar)			Pts

Colour	Result
Gold	Winner
Silver	Second place
Bronze	Third place
Green	Points classification
Blue	Non-points classification
Blue	Non-classified finish (NC)
Purple	Retired, not classified (Ret)
Red	Did not qualify (DNQ)
Red	Did not pre-qualify (DNPQ)
Black	Disqualified (DSQ)
White	Did not start (DNS)
White	Withdrew (WD)
White	Race cancelled (C)
Blank	Did not practice (DNP)
Blank	Did not arrive (DNA)
Blank	Excluded (EX)

**Bold** – Pole

Italics – Fastest Lap

† – Driver did not finish the race,
but was classified as they completed
more than 75% of the race distance.

=== Rookie Cup ===
Pos	Driver	YMC1 (United Arab Emirates)			YMC2 (United Arab Emirates)			DUB (United Arab Emirates)			LUS (Qatar)			Pts
Pos	Driver	R1	R2	R3	R4	R5	R6	R7	R8	R9	R10	R11	R12	Pts
1	(United Kingdom) Kean Nakamura-Berta	2	Ret	3	1	4	1	1	Ret	1	1	C	1	195
2	(Italy) Maximilian Popov	1	3	4	6	2	Ret	2	3	14	7	C	9	119
3	(Poland) Jan Przyrowski	8	14	7	7	1	8	4	2	3	3	C	5	115
4	(United States) Alex Powell	3	12	1	2	16	4	6	Ret	DNS	4	C	3	105
5	(Singapore) Kabir Anurag	11	5	2	4	5	3	8	5	12	5	C	4	101
6	(United States) Sebastian Wheldon	17	10	8	5	3	2	Ret	12	6	2	C	2	92
7	(Colombia) Salim Hanna	9	2	11	13	12	7	5	1	4	8	C	6	85
8	(Brazil) Miguel Costa	5	1	Ret	9	6	6	13	10	9	13	C	8	60
9	(Kyrgyzstan) Artem Severiukhin	7	6	6	3	15	5	18	15	10	9	C	Ret	50
10	(Italy) Emanuele Olivieri							3	Ret	2	6	C	7	47
11	(France) Andrea Dupé	10	4	13	8	14	9	7	6	11	10	C	12	34
12	(France) Jules Roussel	12	7	10	10	7	10	9	9	5	12	C	11	29
13	(Germany) Maxim Rehm	4	15	Ret	15	9	11	10	4	17	Ret	C	DNS	27
14	(Serbia) Andrija Kostić	6	Ret	5	DSQ	11	12	12	13	8	14	C	13	22
15	(Switzerland) Enea Frey	13	9	Ret	12	17†	16	14	7	7	16	C	Ret	14
16	(Monaco) Matteo Giaccardi	15	13	12	14	8	13	17	Ret	16	17	C	10	5
17	(United Arab Emirates) August Raber	14	8	Ret	11	13	15	16	14	11	15	C	15	4
18	(Netherlands) Reno Francot							11	8	18†	11	C	14	4
19	(China) Yuhao Fu	16	11	9	16	10	14	15	11	15	18	C	16	3
Pos	Driver	R1	R2	R3	R4	R5	R6	R7	R8	R9	R10	R11	R12	Pts
Pos	Driver	YMC1 (United Arab Emirates)			YMC2 (United Arab Emirates)			DUB (United Arab Emirates)			LUS (Qatar)			Pts

=== Teams' Championship ===
Ahead of each event, teams nominated two drivers who accumulated points for the Teams' championship.

Pos	Team	No.	YMC1 (United Arab Emirates)			YMC2 (United Arab Emirates)			DUB (United Arab Emirates)			LUS (Qatar)			Pts
Pos	Team	No.	R1	R2	R3	R4	R5	R6	R7	R8	R9	R10	R11	R12	Pts
1	(India) Mumbai Falcons Racing Limited	51	4	Ret	5	2	5	2	3	Ret	2	1	C	1	222
1	(India) Mumbai Falcons Racing Limited	98	31	21	14	7	4	3	Ret	17	9	2	C	2	222
2	(France) R-ace GP	12	24	13	10	4	8	7							199
2	(France) R-ace GP	71	2	5	1	1	15	1	4	5	16	6	C	7	199
2	(France) R-ace GP	73							7	Ret	3	7	C	8	199
3	(Netherlands) MP Motorsport	15	1	6	17	10	Ret	4	2	7	1	26	C	Ret	139
3	(Netherlands) MP Motorsport	16	8	1	3	17	22	11	Ret	19	12	11	C	DSQ	139
4	(France) ART Grand Prix	7										28	C	12	111
4	(France) ART Grand Prix	19	22	14	4	6	6	5	16	9	20	5	C	4	111
4	(France) ART Grand Prix	89	5	Ret	DNS	14	11	8	1	11	5				111
5	(Italy) RPM	5	10	2	Ret	16	7	10	22	15	14	17	C	10	98
5	(Italy) RPM	8	14	26	13	11	2	14	10	3	4	3	C	5	98
6	(Republic of Ireland) Pinnacle Motorsport	29	28	19	Ret	20	24	27	26	21	19	20	C	25	76
6	(Republic of Ireland) Pinnacle Motorsport	41	6	23	2	3	28	6	12	Ret	DNS	4	C	3	76
7	(Italy) Trident	3	3	8	6	8	3	Ret	5	4	23	9	C	11	74
7	(Italy) Trident	47	12	Ret	8	DSQ	20	20	21	20	13				74
7	(Italy) Trident	87										18	C	16	74
8	(Australia) Rodin Motorsport	2	7	3	18	12	1	13	9	2	26	15	C	18	68
8	(Australia) Rodin Motorsport	4	11	Ret	DNS	29†	9	21	Ret	Ret	15	24	C	23	68
9	(Switzerland) G4 Racing	14	13	16	9	5	27	9	28	22	18	12	C	Ret	21
9	(Switzerland) G4 Racing	24				18	10	16	17	14	7	16	C	15	21
9	(Switzerland) G4 Racing	67	20	11	23										21
10	(Italy) CL Motorsport	6				23	29†	28							20
10	(Italy) CL Motorsport	28	17	9	7	21	13	23	8	6	27	25	C	19	20
10	(Italy) CL Motorsport	57	18	Ret	DNS										20
10	(Italy) CL Motorsport	69							20	13	29†	14	C	22	20
11	(Netherlands) Van Amersfoort Racing	11	16	7	22	9	12	22	13	25†	8	21	C	14	13
11	(Netherlands) Van Amersfoort Racing	55	23	12	11	22	17	Ret	15	DNS	10	23	C	17	13
Pos	Team	No.	R1	R2	R3	R4	R5	R6	R7	R8	R9	R10	R11	R12	Pts
Pos	Team	No.	YMC1 (United Arab Emirates)			YMC2 (United Arab Emirates)			DUB (United Arab Emirates)			LUS (Qatar)			Pts
