= Maximilian Popov =

Russian and Grenadian racing driver (born 2008)

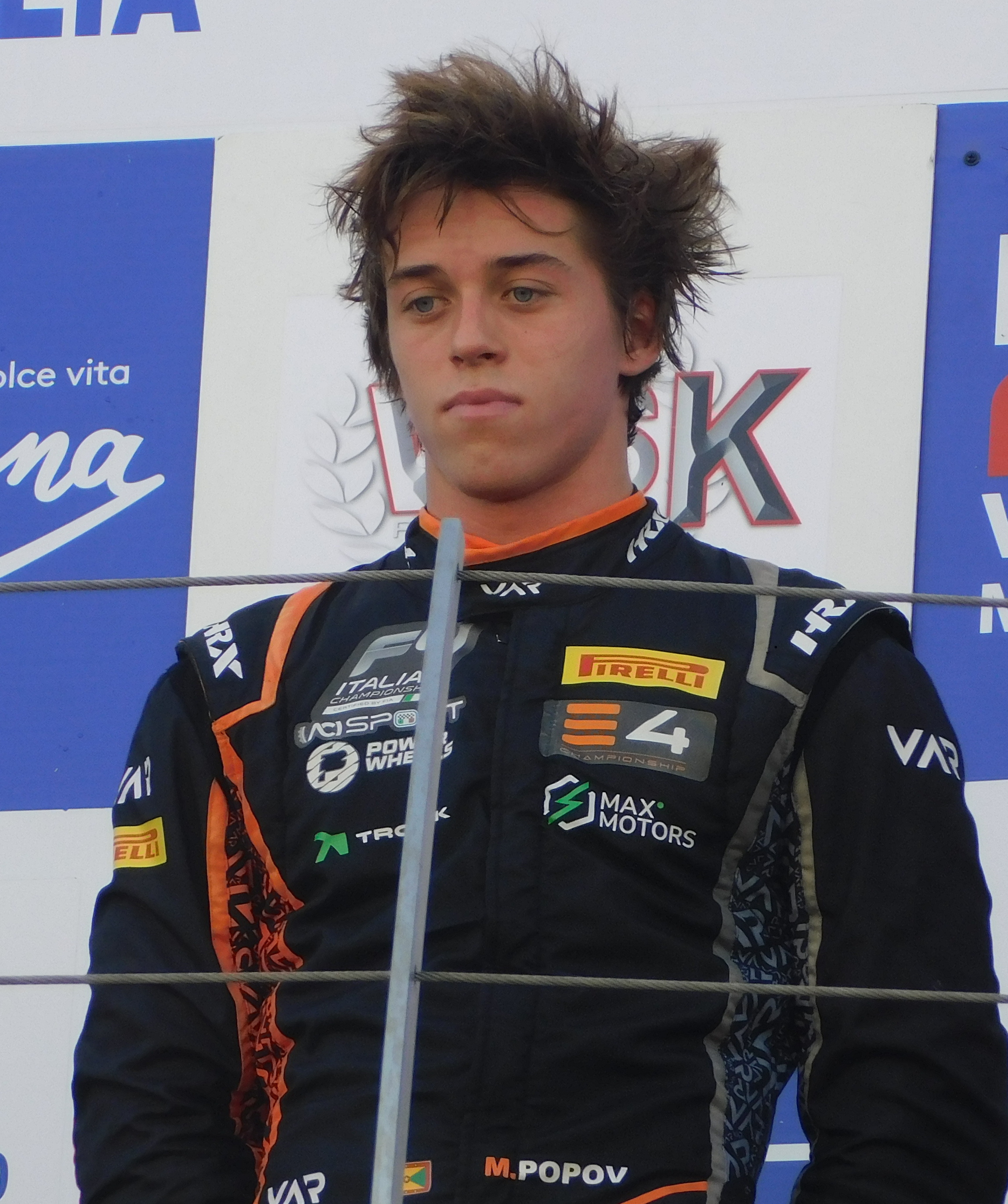
- Popov in 2025
- Nationality: (Russia) Russian (Grenada) Grenadian (Italy) Italian (Note: Popov is Russian-Grenadian and competes under an Italian licence.)
- Born: 21 August 2008 (age 18) Sochi, Russia

Formula Regional European Championship career
- Debut season: 2026
- Current team: Trident
- Car number: 33
- Starts: 19
- Wins: 1
- Podiums: 1
- Poles: 1
- Fastest laps: 0
- Best finish: 11th in 2026

Previous series
- 2026 2025–2026 2025 2024 2024–2025 2024–2025 2024: FR Middle East; Eurocup-3; Formula Winter Series; F4 CEZ; Euro 4/E4; Italian F4; F4 UAE
- Statistics up to date as of 15 November 2026.

Maximilian "Max" Popov (Note: Sometimes spelled Maksimilian Popov.) (Russian: Максимилиан Попов; born 21 August 2008) is a Russian and Grenadian racing driver who last competed in Eurocup-3 with Griffin Core.

He previously competed in the Formula Regional European Championship for Trident. Popov raced in Italian F4 in 2025, finishing sixth.

== Career ==
=== Karting (2013–2023) ===
Popov began karting at the age of five, competing until 2023. In his karting career, he most notably finished runner-up in the 2022 WSK Champions Cup in the OK class with Ward Racing. With the same team, Popov also was third in the 2019 WSK Final Cup and 2021 Champions of the Future in the 60 Mini and OK-J classes, respectively.

=== Formula 4 (2024–2025) ===
==== 2024 ====
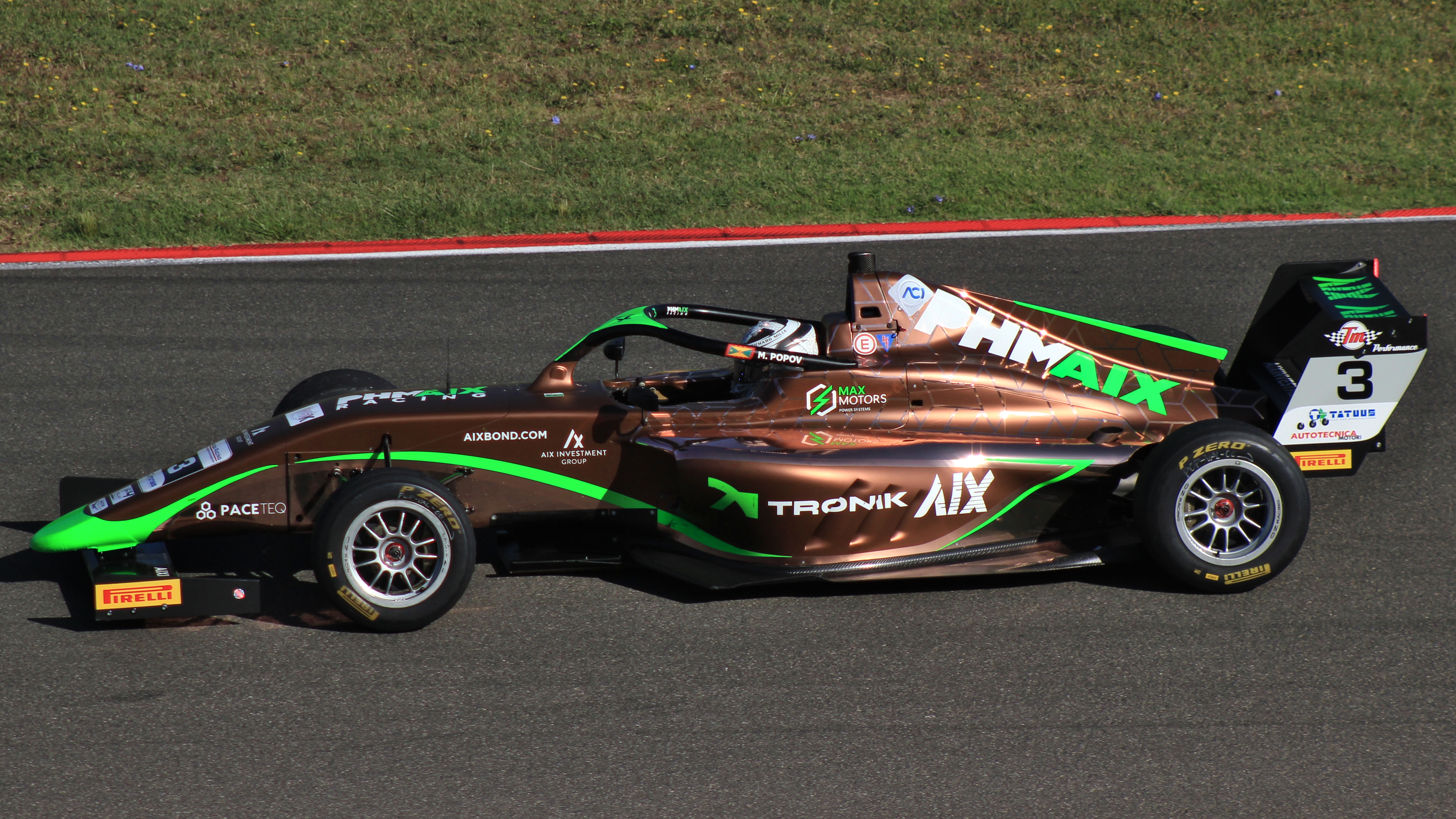
Popov driving at the Mugello Circuit during the 2024 Italian F4 Championship

Stepping up to single-seaters for 2024, Popov joined PHM AIX Racing to compete in the Formula 4 UAE Championship. In the five-round winter series, Popov scored a best result of 11th in the second race of the second Yas Marina round and ended the season 27th in points. For the rest of the year, Popov stayed with the team to compete in both the Italian F4 and Euro 4 Championships. In the former, Popov scored a best result of eighth in race one at Barcelona, and ended the year 21st in the standings after taking three more points finishes. In Euro 4, he scored two ninth-place finishes at Mugello and Red Bull Ring to end the season 21st in points. During 2024, Popov also raced with the same team in the Red Bull Ring round of the Formula 4 CEZ Championship, in which he won race two.

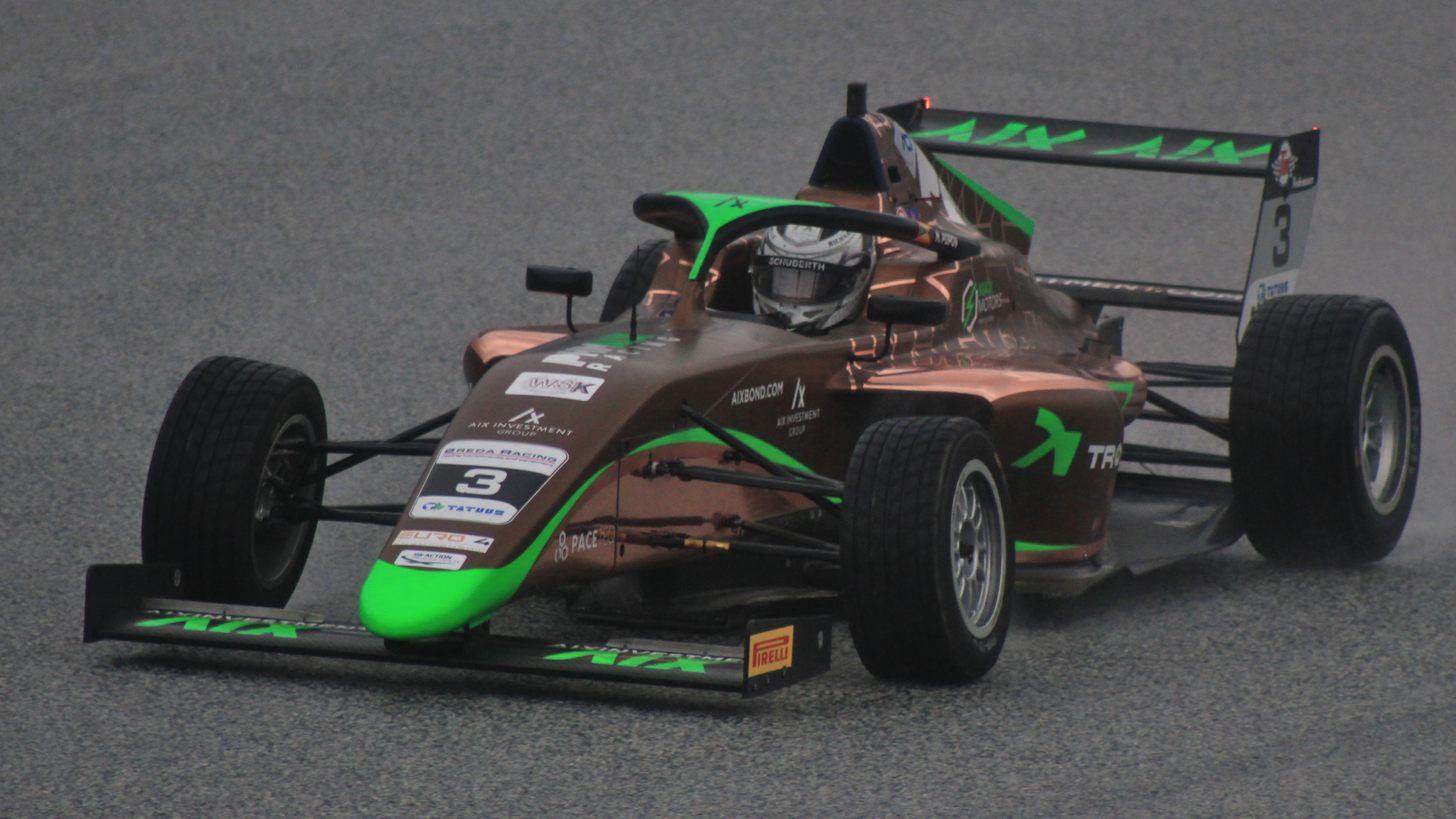
Popov driving at the Red Bull Ring during the 2024 Euro 4 Championship

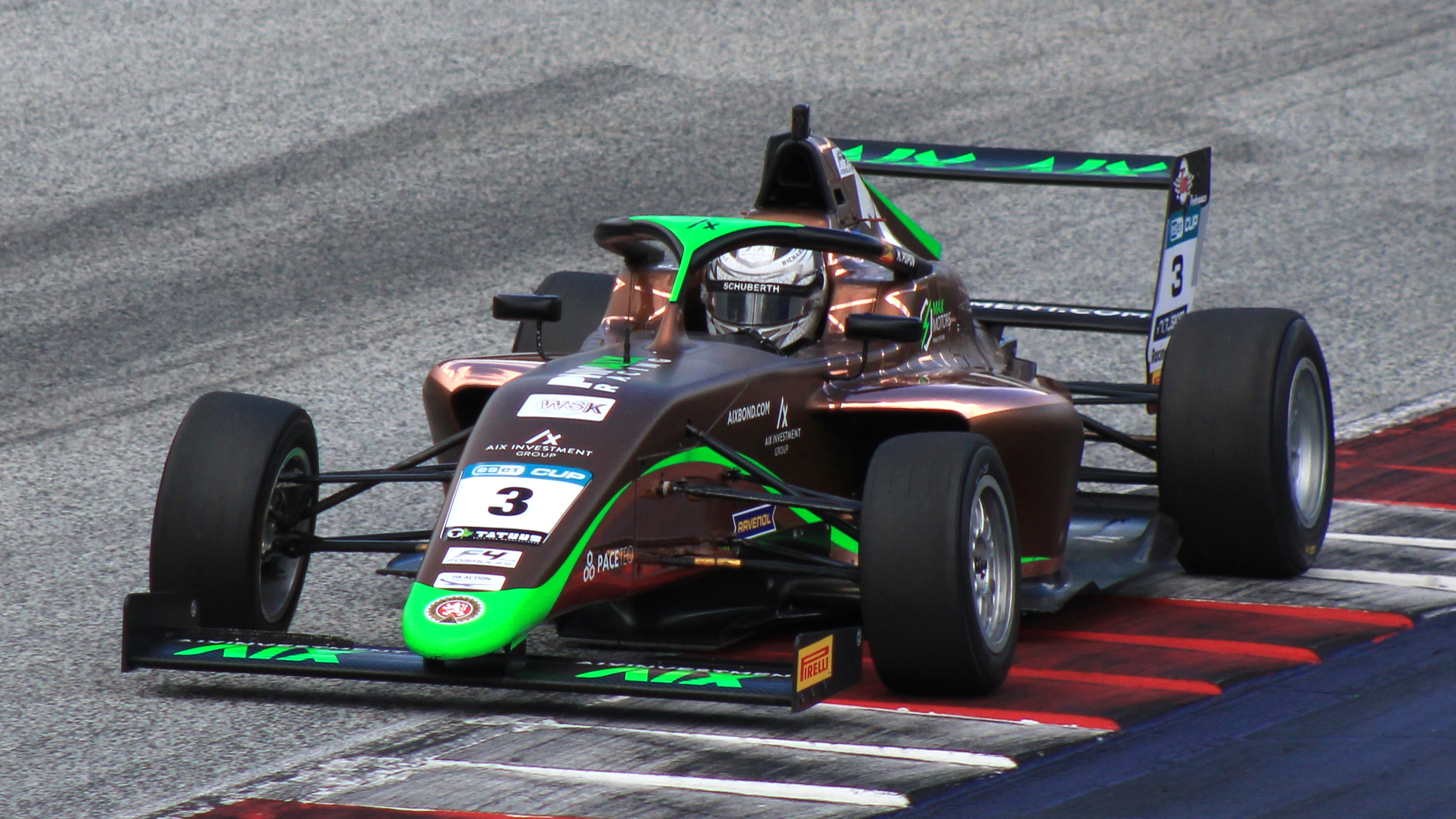
Popov driving at the Red Bull Ring during the 2024 Formula 4 CEZ Championship

==== 2025 ====
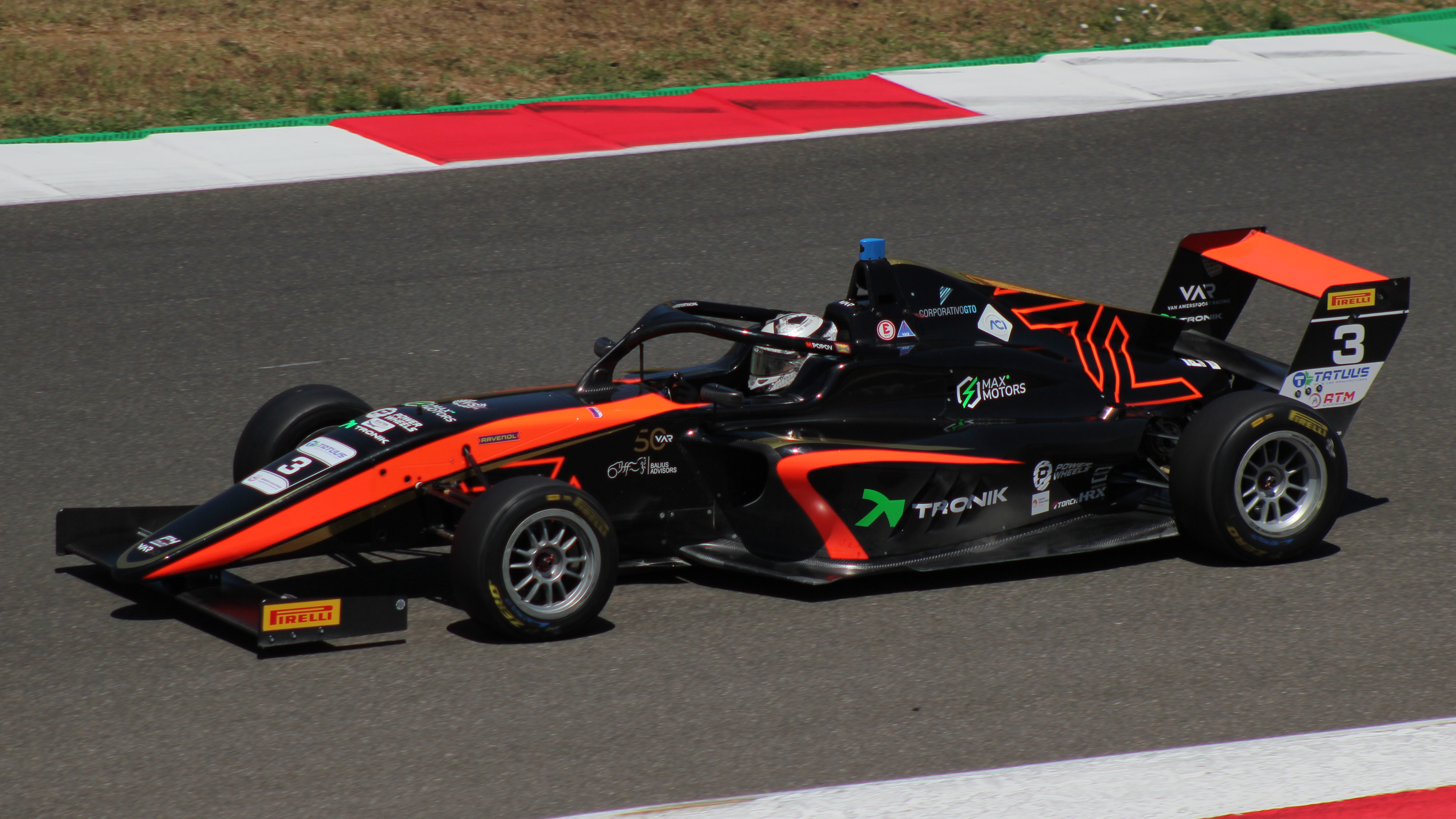
Popov driving at the Mugello Circuit during the 2025 Italian F4 Championship

In 2025, Popov switched to Van Amersfoort Racing for his sophomore season in Formula 4 competition. Starting off the year in Formula Winter Series, Popov finished third in the second race in the season-opening round at Algarve, before repeating the same feat at round later in race three at Valencia. In the following two rounds, Popov finished no higher than fourth as he ended the season sixth in points. In the Italian series, Popov started off the season with two second-place finishes at Misano and a third-place finish at Vallelunga, before not scoring points at Monza and only scoring a best result of fifth at Mugello to enter the second half of the season seventh in points. In the final three rounds, Popov finished third in race two at Barcelona and repeated the same feat in race one at Misano to end the year sixth in points. Popov also raced in the three-round E4 Championship for the same team, scoring a lone podium at Mugello en route to an eighth-place points finish.

=== Formula Regional (2026) ===
==== 2025 ====
At the end of 2025, Popov joined the Eurocup-3 grid to race in Barcelona with GRS Team. On his series debut, Popov finished tenth in race one, but wasn't eligible to score points as he was a guest driver.

==== 2026 ====
At the start of 2026, Popov joined Trident to compete in the Formula Regional Middle East Trophy. In the four-round season, Popov scored a pair of third-place finishes in the first two Yas Marina rounds to take seventh in the overall standings. Popov remained with Trident for the rest of the year to race in the Formula Regional European Championship. With the Italian team, Popov took his only win of the season from pole in race three at Spa and five other points finishes to end the year 11th overall. During 2026, Popov also competed with Campos Racing-ran Griffin Core in the final three rounds of Eurocup-3, in which he took a lone podium in the Jerez sprint. At the end of November, Popov joined RPM to contest the Macau Grand Prix.

== Karting record ==
=== Karting career summary ===
Season	Series	Team	Position
2017	WSK Super Master Series – 60 Mini	Babyrace Driver Academy	95th
2017	Trofeo Delle Industrie – 60 Mini	Babyrace Driver Academy	28th
2017	ROK Cup International Final – Mini Rok	Babyrace Driver Academy	16th
2017	WSK Final Cup – 60 Mini	Babyrace Driver Academy	46th
2018	WSK Champions Cup – 60 Mini	Parolin Motorsport	16th
2018	South Garda Winter Cup – Mini Rok	Parolin Motorsport	12th
2018	WSK Final Cup – 60 Mini	Parolin Motorsport	17th
2018	WSK Super Master Series – 60 Mini	Parolin Motorsport; Praga Junior Team (Note: Popov competed for Parolin Motorsport in rounds 1–3 and for Praga Junior Team in round 4.)	33rd
2019	WSK Champions Cup – 60 Mini	Baby Race Driver Academy	17th
2019	WSK Super Master Series – 60 Mini	Baby Race Driver Academy	4th
2019	South Garda Winter Cup – Mini Rok	Baby Race Driver Academy	5th
2019	WSK Euro Series – 60 Mini	Baby Race Driver Academy	20th
2019	ROK Cup International Final – Mini Rok	Baby Race Driver Academy	17th
2019	WSK Open Cup – 60 Mini	Baby Race Driver Academy	29th
2019	WSK Final Cup – 60 Mini	Baby Race Driver Academy	3rd
2020	WSK Champions Cup – OK-J	Ward Racing	10th
2020	WSK Super Master Series – OK-J	Ward Racing	46th
2021	WSK Champions Cup – OK-J	Ward Racing	4th
2021	WSK Super Master Series – OK-J	Ward Racing	8th
2021	Champions of the Future – OK-J	Ward Racing	3rd
2021	Karting European Championship – OK-J	Ward Racing	20th
2021	WSK Euro Series – OK-J	Ward Racing	25th
2021	Karting World Championship – OK-J	Ward Racing	7th
2021	South Garda Winter Cup – OK-J	Ward Racing	5th
2021	WSK Final Cup – OK-J	Ward Racing	4th
2022	WSK Champions Cup – OK	Ward Racing	2nd
2022	WSK Super Master Series – OK	Ward Racing	15th
2022	Champions of the Future Euro Series – OK	Ward Racing	54th
2022	Karting European Championship – OK	Ward Racing; Koski Motorsport (Note: Popov competed for Ward Racing in rounds 1–3 and for Koski Motorsport in round 4.)	37th
2022	WSK Euro Series – OK	Koski Motorsport	25th
2022	Karting World Championship – OK	Koski Motorsport	29th
2022	WSK Open Cup – OK	Koski Motorsport	21st
2022	WSK Final Cup – OK	Koski Motorsport	16th
2023	South Garda Winter Cup – OK	Koski Motorsport	7th
2023	WSK Champions Cup – OK	Koski Motorsport	6th
2023	WSK Super Master Series – OK	Koski Motorsport; KR Motorsport (Note: Popov competed for Koski Motorsport in round 1 and for KR Motorsport in round 4.)	27th
2023	Karting European Championship – OK	Koski Motorsport; KR Motorsport (Note: Popov competed for Koski Motorsport in round 1 and for KR Motorsport in rounds 3–4.)	27th
2023	Karting World Championship – OK	Kart Republic Motorsport	NC

== Racing record ==
=== Racing career summary ===
Season	Series	Team	Races	Wins	Poles	F/Laps	Podiums	Points	Position
2024	Formula 4 UAE Championship	PHM AIX Racing	15	0	0	0	0	0	27th
2024	Italian F4 Championship	PHM AIX Racing	21	0	0	0	0	9	21st
2024	Formula 4 CEZ Championship	PHM AIX Racing	3	1	0	0	1	46	11th
2024	Euro 4 Championship	PHM AIX Racing	9	0	0	0	0	4	21st
2025	Formula Winter Series	Van Amersfoort Racing	12	0	0	0	2	88	6th
2025	Italian F4 Championship	Van Amersfoort Racing	20	0	0	1	5	143	6th
2025	E4 Championship	Van Amersfoort Racing	9	0	0	0	1	45	8th
2025	Eurocup-3	GRS Team	2	0	0	0	0	0	NC†
2026	Formula Regional Middle East Trophy	Trident	11	0	0	1	2	70	7th
2026	Formula Regional European Championship	Trident	19	1	1	0	1	60	11th
2026	Eurocup-3	Griffin Core	7	0	0	0	1	17	17th
2026	Macau Grand Prix	RPM						—N/a	

* Season still in progress.

=== Complete Formula 4 UAE Championship results ===
(key) (Races in bold indicate pole position) (Races in italics indicate fastest lap)

Year	Team	1	2	3	4	5	6	7	8	9	10	11	12	13	14	15	Pos	Points
2024	PHM AIX Racing	YMC1; 1; 26	YMC1; 2; 17	YMC1; 3; 22	YMC2; 1; 14	YMC2; 2; 11	YMC2; 3; 14	DUB1; 1; 24	DUB1; 2; 20	DUB1; 3; 23	YMC3; 1; 28	YMC3; 2; 19	YMC3; 3; 25	DUB2; 1; 18	DUB2; 2; 16	DUB2; 3; 26	27th	0

=== Complete Italian F4 Championship results ===
(key) (Races in bold indicate pole position; races in italics indicate fastest lap)

Year	Team	1	2	3	4	5	6	7	8	9	10	11	12	13	14	15	16	17	18	19	20	21	22	23	24	25	DC	Points
2024	PHM AIX Racing	MIS; 1; 21	MIS; 2; 13	MIS; 3; 13	IMO; 1; 15	IMO; 2; 15	IMO; 3; 26	VLL; 1; 28†	VLL; 2; 13	VLL; 3; 15	MUG; 1; 18	MUG; 2; 14	MUG; 3; 16	LEC; 1; 18	LEC; 2 Ret	LEC; 3; 9	CAT; 1; 8	CAT; 2; 10	CAT; 3; 21	MNZ; 1 Ret	MNZ; 2; 9	MNZ; 3; 27					21st	9
2025	Van Amersfoort Racing	MIS1; 1	MIS1; 2; 2	MIS1; 3; 4	MIS1; 4; 2	VLL; 1	VLL; 2; 6	VLL; 3; 3	VLL; 4; 22	MNZ; 1; 17	MNZ; 2; 29	MNZ; 3; 15	MUG; 1; 12	MUG; 2; 26	MUG; 3; 5	IMO; 1; 11	IMO; 2 C	IMO; 3; 6	CAT; 1; 11	CAT; 2; 3	CAT; 3 C	MIS2; 1; 3	MIS2; 2; 5	MIS2; 3	MIS2; 4; 5	MIS2; 5; 8	6th	143

=== Complete Formula 4 CEZ Championship results ===
(key) (Races in bold indicate pole position; races in italics indicate fastest lap)

Year	Team	1	2	3	4	5	6	7	8	9	10	11	12	13	14	15	16	17	18	DC	Points
2024	PHM AIX Racing	BAL; 1	BAL; 2	BAL; 3	RBR; 1; 3	RBR; 2; 1	RBR; 3; 7	SVK; 1	SVK; 2	SVK; 3	MOS; 1	MOS; 2	MOS; 3	BRN; 1	BRN; 2	BRN; 3	SAL; 1	SAL; 2	SAL; 3	11th	46

=== Complete Euro 4/E4 Championship results ===
(key) (Races in bold indicate pole position; races in italics indicate fastest lap)

Year	Team	1	2	3	4	5	6	7	8	9	DC	Points
2024	PHM AIX Racing	MUG; 1; 12	MUG; 2; 19	MUG; 3; 9	RBR; 1; 14	RBR; 2; 9	RBR; 3; 12	MNZ; 1; 20	MNZ; 2; 14	MNZ; 3; 27	21st	4
2025	Van Amersfoort Racing	LEC; 1; 24†	LEC; 2; 6	LEC; 3; 26†	MUG; 1; 3	MUG; 2; 8	MUG; 3; 16	MNZ; 1; 4	MNZ; 2; 7	MNZ; 3; 14	8th	45

=== Complete Formula Winter Series results ===
(key) (Races in bold indicate pole position) (Races in italics indicate fastest lap)

Year	Team	1	2	3	4	5	6	7	8	9	10	11	12	DC	Points
2025	Van Amersfoort Racing	POR; 1; 9	POR; 2; 3	POR; 3; 29	CRT; 1; 5	CRT; 2; 5	CRT; 3; 3	ARA; 1; 4	ARA; 2; 4	ARA; 3; 4	CAT; 1; 21	CAT; 2 Ret	CAT; 3; 13	6th	88

=== Complete Eurocup-3 results ===
(key) (Races in bold indicate pole position) (Races in italics indicate fastest lap)

Year	Team	1	2	3	4	5	6	7	8	9	10	11	12	13	14	15	16	17	18	19	DC	Points
2025	GRS Team	RBR; 1	RBR; 2	POR; 1	POR; SR	POR; 2	LEC; 1	LEC; SR	LEC; 2	MNZ; 1	MNZ; 2	ASS; 1	ASS; 2	SPA; 1	SPA; 2	JER; 1	JER; 2	CAT; 1; 10	CAT; 2; 19		NC†	0
2026	Griffin Core	LEC; 1	LEC; SR	LEC; 2	POR; 1	POR; 2	IMO; 1	IMO; SR	IMO; 2	MNZ; 1	MNZ; 2	SIL; 1	SIL; 2	JER; 1; 12	JER; SR; 2	JER; 2; 11	HUN; 1; 23	HUN; 2; 8	CAT; 1; 24	CAT; 2; 8	17th	17

^{†} As Popov was a guest driver, he was ineligible for points.

=== Complete Formula Regional Middle East Trophy results ===
(key) (Races in bold indicate pole position) (Races in italics indicate fastest lap)

Year	Entrant	1	2	3	4	5	6	7	8	9	10	11	12	DC	Points
2026	Trident	YMC1; 1; 3	YMC1; 2; 8	YMC1; 3; 6	YMC2; 1; 8	YMC2; 2; 3	YMC2; 3 Ret	DUB; 1; 5	DUB; 2; 4	DUB; 3; 23	LUS; 1; 9	LUS; 2 C	LUS; 3; 11	7th	70

=== Complete Formula Regional European Championship results ===
(key) (Races in bold indicate pole position) (Races in italics indicate fastest lap)

Year	Team	1	2	3	4	5	6	7	8	9	10	11	12	13	14	15	16	17	18	19	20	DC	Points
2026	Trident	RBR; 1; 6	RBR; 2; 11	RBR; 3; 11	ZAN; 1; 10	ZAN; 2 Ret	SPA; 1; 18	SPA; 2 C	**SPA**; **3**; 1	MNZ; 1 Ret	MNZ; 2; 13	MNZ; 3; 7	HUN; 1; 22	HUN; 2; 20	LEC; 1; 13	LEC; 2; 19	IMO; 1; 11	IMO; 2 Ret	IMO; 3; 6	HOC; 1; 5	HOC; 2 Ret	11th	60

=== Complete Macau Grand Prix results ===
Year	Team	Car	Qualifying	Quali Race	Main Race
2026	(Italy) RPM	Tatuus T-326	TBD	TBD	TBD
