= Emanuele Olivieri =

Italian racing driver (born 2008)

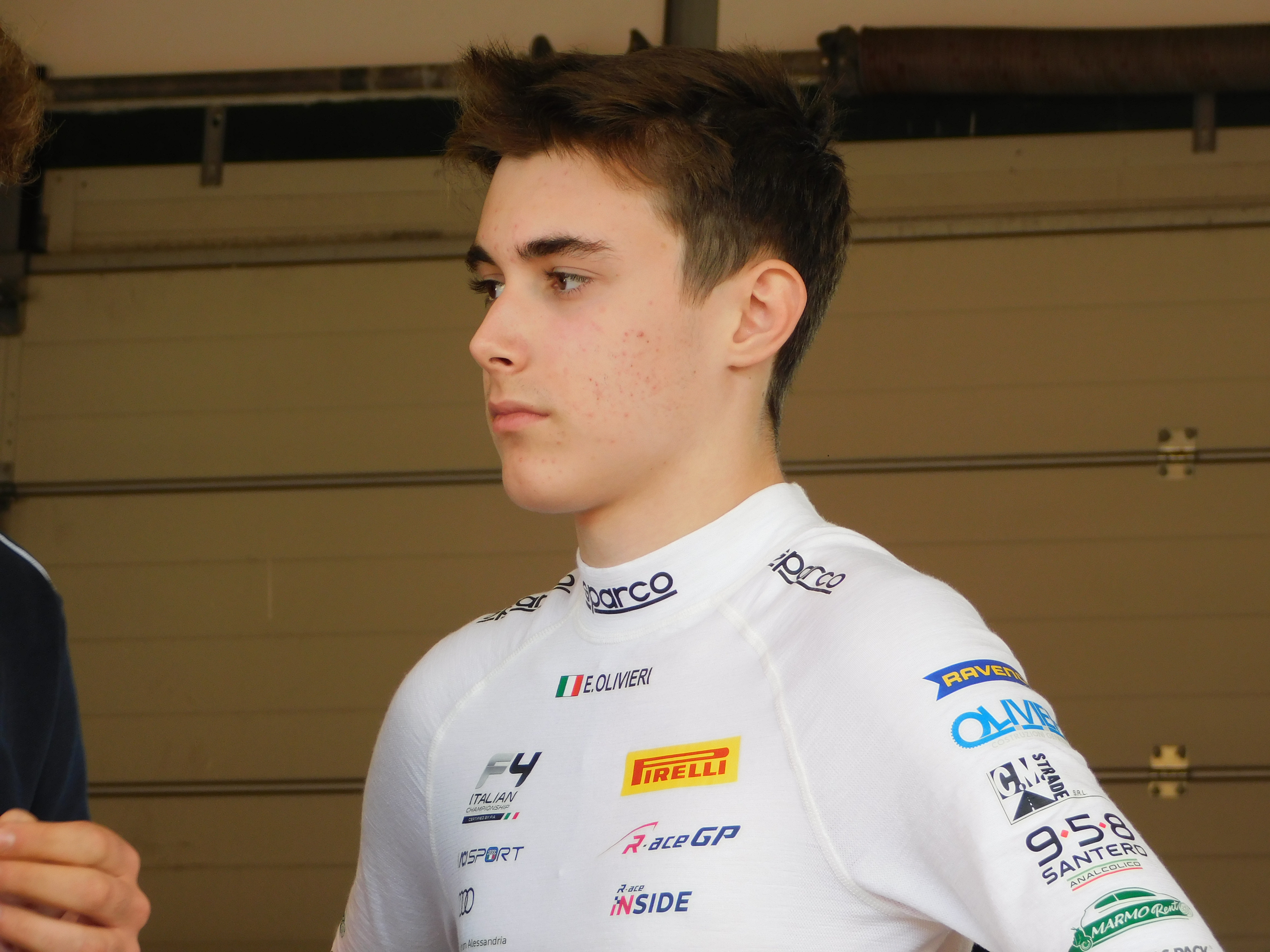
- Olivieri in 2025
- Nationality: (Italy) Italian
- Born: 2 August 2008 (age 18) Canelli, Italy

Formula Regional European Championship career
- Debut season: 2026
- Current team: R-ace GP
- Car number: 73
- Starts: 19
- Wins: 2
- Podiums: 9
- Poles: 2
- Fastest laps: 3
- Best finish: 1st in 2026

Previous series
- 2026; 2025; 2024–2025; 2024; 2024: FR Middle East; F4 Middle East; Italian F4; Euro 4; Formula Winter Series

Championship titles
- 2026 2025: FR European; F4 Middle East
- Statistics up to date as of 18 September 2026.

Emanuele Olivieri (born 2 August 2008 in Canelli) is an Italian racing driver who last competed in the Formula Regional European Championship for R-ace GP.

Olivieri is the 2025 F4 Middle East and the 2026 FREC champion. He is the godson of three-time 24 Hours of Le Mans winner Rinaldo Capello and is part of Oliver Victor Kristensen's 5P Agency.

== Career ==
=== Karting (2019–2023) ===
Ahead of 2020, it was announced that Olivieri would step up to WSK-organized championships. In his first full year in WSK championships, he finished seventh in the WSK Open Cup and eighth in the 25th edition of Trofeo Ayrton Senna. In 2021, Olivieri won the Andrea Margutti Trophy in 60 Mini, finished runner-up in WSK Champions Cup and WSK Super Master Series and placed third in WSK Euro Series.

Stepping up to OKJ for 2022, Olivieri had a difficult year, but won the WSK Final Cup towards the end of the year. Moving to OK in 2023, Olivieri finished fifth in the South Garda Winter Cup and eighth in the WSK Champions Cup before joining Birel ART ahead of the final round of the Champions of the Future series.

Near the end of his karting career, Olivieri attended the Ferrari Driver Academy scout camp and the Richard Mille Young Talent Academy shootout, while also winning the 20° Supercorso Federale after impressing in the FDA scout camp.

=== Formula 4 (2024–2025) ===
==== 2024 ====
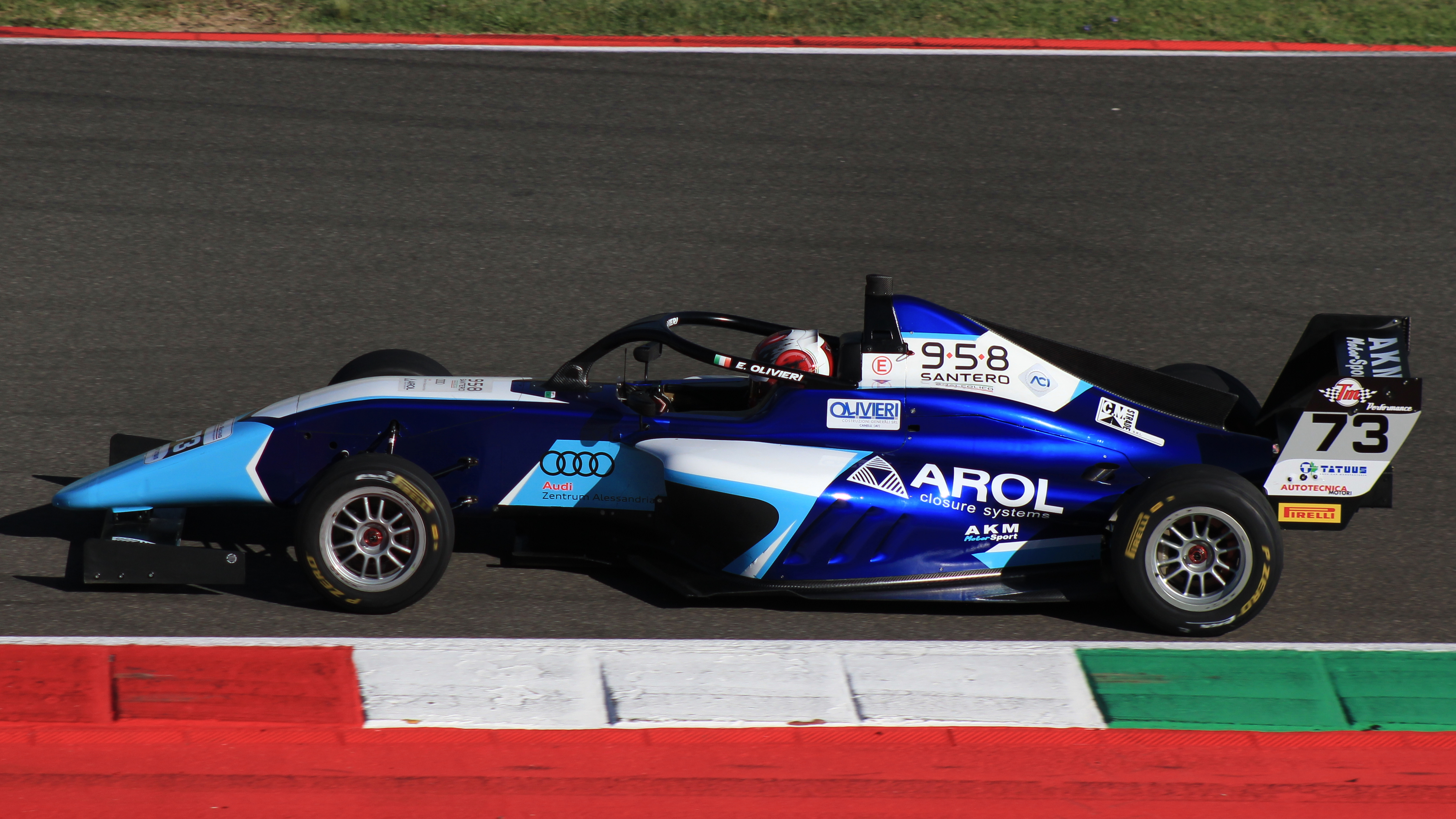
Olivieri driving at the Mugello Circuit during the 2024 Italian F4 Championship

In early 2024, AKM Motorsport announced that Olivieri would compete in the Formula Winter Series, Italian F4 Championship and Euro 4 championships. In Formula Winter Series, Olivieri competed in the first two rounds, scoring points with a ninth place in the third Valencia race, ending the season 28th in the standings. In Italian F4, Olivieri capitalised on post-race penalties to score points in the first two races at Imola and the first Vallelunga race. After not scoring points at Mugello, Olivieri stayed out of trouble in a wet-dry race three at Paul Ricard to take sixth place. He ended the season 17th in the standings on 11 points. Competing in the Italian rounds of the Euro 4 Championship, Olivieri finished seventh in the second Monza race, but he would be relegated to 17th post-race after being given a 25-second penalty for contact with Davide Larini. In the following race, he finished tenth on track but would be promoted to ninth after post-race penalties. Olivieri finished 19th in the standings with two points.

==== 2025 ====
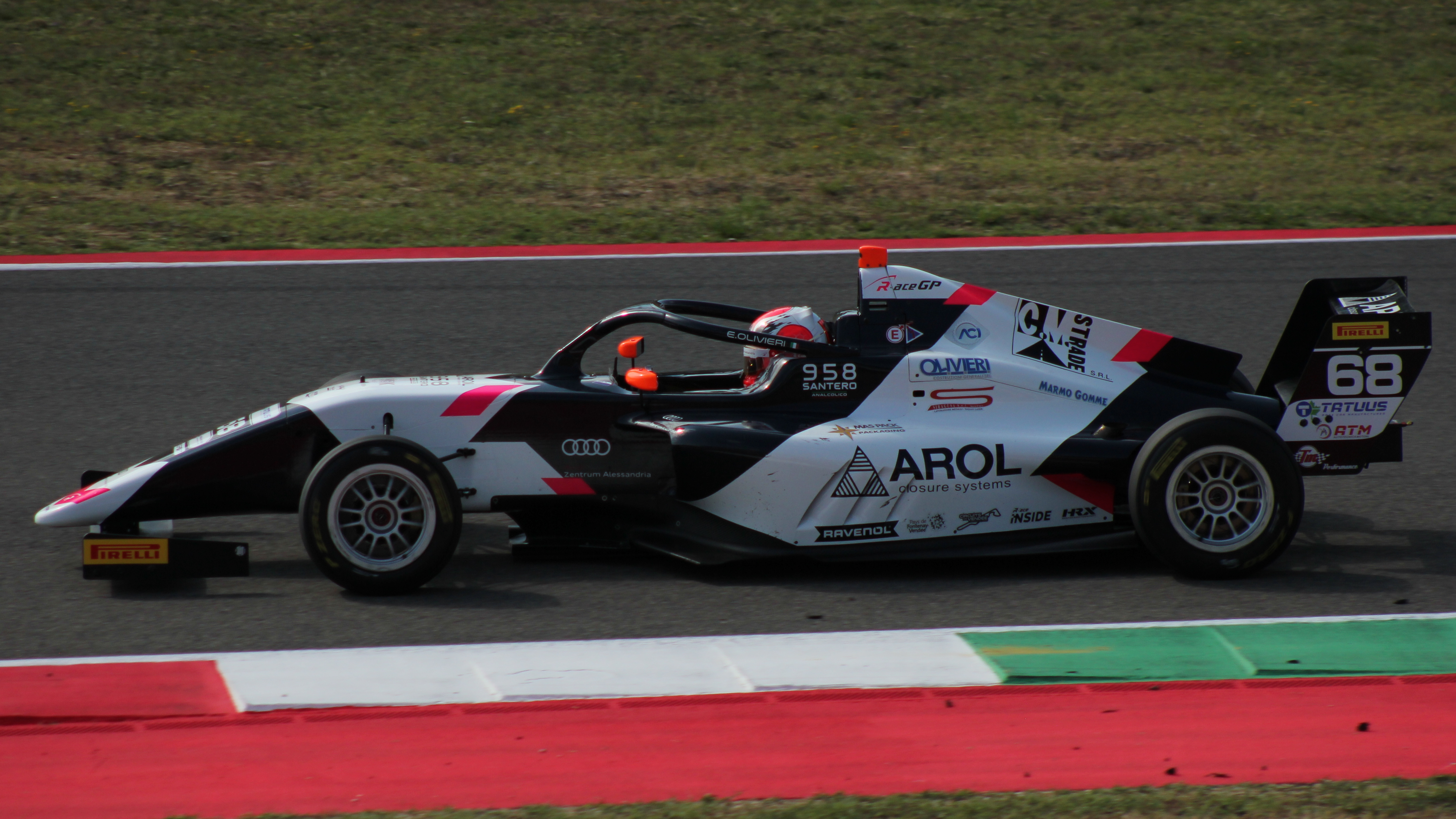
Olivieri driving at the Mugello Circuit during the 2025 Italian F4 Championship

After testing with them in Italian F4's post-season tests, Olivieri joined R-ace GP to compete in the 2025 F4 Middle East Championship. In the first qualifying session of the season at Yas Marina, Olivieri took his first pole in Formula 4 ahead of Alex Powell. From pole, Olivieri took a dominant lights-to-flag win in race one, before climbing from tenth to third in race two, and winning race three by 0.071 seconds over Kean Nakamura-Berta. In the second round of the season, held at the Corkscrew layout of Yas Marina, Olivieri took both pole positions and grew his points lead by taking his third win of the season in race one. In race two Olivieri charged from 10th place to finish fourth, while in race three, he won from pole by holding off Nakamura-Berta following several safety car restarts.

At Dubai, Olivieri led pre-event testing before taking pole for race one and leading from lights to flag to take his fifth win of the season. From tenth in race two, Olivieri charged through the pack to take second, while in race three he held on to third place after defending from Reno Francot. In the second-to-last round of the season at Abu Dhabi, Olivieri qualified on pole for race one, which he won on track but was later penalized for jumping the start, dropping him back to third. After retiring in race two, Olivieri rebounded to end the weekend with a third-place finish, to extend his championship lead. In the season-ending Lusail round, Olivieri finished second on track to Adam Al Azhari in race one, before inheriting the win post-race after Al Azhari was disqualified on technical grounds. In race two, Olivieri wrapped up the title with a race to spare after finishing second to teammate Alex Powell, a feat he repeated in the finale.

In Italian F4, Olivieri opened up the season by scoring two podiums at Misano and one at Vallelunga, before scoring a double pole position at Barcelona and finishing third in race one en route to a seventh-place points finish at the end of the season. At the end of the year, Olivieri raced in the FIA F4 World Cup, in which he won the qualification race and finished second in the main race to Jules Roussel.

=== Formula Regional (2026–present) ===
In early 2026, Olivieri raced the final two rounds of the Formula Regional Middle East Trophy with R-ace GP. Racing at Dubai and Lusail, Olivieri scored a best result of third in race three of the former round as he ended the season 14th in points. For the rest of the year, Olivieri remained with the French team to race in the Formula Regional European Championship. After a quiet start to the season, which included a lone podium at Zandvoort, Olivieri won at Monza and Imola, as well as six other podiums to clinch the rookie and overall titles. At the end of November, he competed in the Macau Grand Prix with the team.

== Karting record ==
=== Karting career summary ===
Season	Series	Team	Position
2019	WSK Open Cup — 60 Mini	Fabrizio Olivieri	53rd
2019	Trofeo Invernal Ayrton Senna — 60 Mini	Fabrizio Olivieri	24th
2020	WSK Champions Cup — 60 Mini	Fabrizio Olivieri	NC
2020	WSK Super Master Series — 60 Mini	Birel ART Racing	42nd
2020	WSK Euro Series — 60 Mini	Formula K Serafini	18th
2020	ROK Cup International Final — Mini ROK	Formula K Serafini	19th
2020	Andrea Margutti Trophy — 60 Mini	Formula K Serafini	10th
2020	WSK Open Cup — 60 Mini	Formula K Serafini	7th
2020	Trofeo Ayrton Senna — Mini	Formula K Serafini	8th
2021	WSK Champions Cup — 60 Mini	Formula K Serafini	**2nd**
2021	WSK Super Master Series — 60 Mini	Formula K Serafini	**2nd**
2021	WSK Euro Series — 60 Mini	Formula K Serafini	**3rd**
2021	Andrea Margutti Trophy — 60 Mini	Formula K Serafini	**1st**
2021	WSK Open Cup — 60 Mini	Formula K Serafini	5th
2021	Trofeo delle Industrie — 60 Mini	Formula K Serafini	12th
2021	WSK Final Cup — 60 Mini	Formula K Serafini	NC
2021	Italian Championship — 60 Mini		9th
2022	WSK Champions Cup — OK-J	IPK Official Racing Team	26th
2022	WSK Super Master Series — OK-J	IPK Official Racing Team	41st
2022	CIK-FIA European Championship — OK-J	IPK Official Racing Team	20th
2022	Champions of the Future — OK-J	IPK Official Racing Team	72nd
2022	WSK Euro Series — OK-J	IPK Official Racing Team	32nd
2022	CIK-FIA World Championship — OK-J	IPK Official Racing Team	102nd
2022	WSK Final Cup — OK-J	IPK Official Racing Team	**1st**
2022	Italian Championship — OK-J		18th
2023	South Garda Winter Cup — OK	IPK Official Racing Team	5th
2023	WSK Champions Cup — OK	IPK Official Racing Team	8th
2023	WSK Super Master Series — OK	IPK Official Racing Team	13th
2023	CIK-FIA European Championship — OK	IPK Official Racing Team	34th
2023	Champions of the Future — OK	IPK Official Racing Team; Birel ART Racing (Note: Olivieri competed for IPK Official Racing Team in Rounds 1-4 before switching to Birel ART Racing for the final round.)	15th
2023	WSK Euro Series — OK	Birel ART Racing	49th
2023	CIK-FIA World Championship — OK	Birel ART Racing	35th
2023	WSK Final Cup — OK	Birel ART Racing	26th

=== Complete CIK-FIA results ===
==== Complete CIK-FIA World Championship results ====
Year	Entrant	Class	Circuit	QH	SH	F
2022	IPK Official Racing Team	OK-J	(Italy) Sarno	102nd	DNQ	DNPQ
2023	Birel ART Racing	OK	(Italy) Franciacorta	25th	29th	Ret (Note: Did not finish, but was classified 35th.)

==== Complete CIK-FIA European Championship results ====
(key) (Races in bold indicate pole position; races in italics indicate fastest lap)

Year	Entrant	Class	1	2	3	4	5	6	7	8	9	10	11	12	Pos	Points
2022	IPK Official Racing Team	OK-J	POR; SH; 62	POR; F DNQ	ZUE; SH; 25	ZUE; F Ret	KRI; SH; 7	KRI; F 7	FRN; SH; 44	FRN; F DNQ					20th	13
2023	IPK Official Racing Team	OK	VAL; QH; 51	VAL; SH; 57	VAL; F DNQ	TŘI; QH; 47	TŘI; SH; 46	TŘI; F DNQ	RØD; QH; 33	RØD; SH; 34	RØD; F 14	CRE; QH; 28	CRE; SH; 30	CRE; F Ret	34th	2

== Racing record ==
=== Racing career summary ===
Season	Series	Team	Races	Wins	Poles	F/Laps	Podiums	Points	Position
2024	Formula Winter Series	AKM Motorsport	6	0	0	0	0	2	28th
2024	Italian F4 Championship	AKM Motorsport	21	0	0	0	0	11	17th
2024	Euro 4 Championship	AKM Motorsport	6	0	0	0	0	2	23rd
2025	F4 Middle East Championship	R-ace GP	15	6	5	9	13	339	**1st**
2025	Italian F4 Championship	R-ace GP	20	0	2	2	4	140	7th
2025	FIA F4 World Cup		1	0	1	0	1	—N/a	**2nd**
2026	Formula Regional Middle East Trophy	R-ace GP	5	0	0	1	1	31	14th
2026	Formula Regional European Championship	R-ace GP	19	2	2	3	9	218	**1st**
2026	Macau Grand Prix	R-ace GP	0	0	0	0	0	—N/a	TBD

* Season still in progress

=== Complete Formula Winter Series results ===
(key) (Races in bold indicate pole position; races in italics indicate fastest lap)

Year	Team	1	2	3	4	5	6	7	8	9	10	11	12	DC	Points
2024	AKM Motorsport	JER; 1; 22	JER; 2; 22	JER; 3; 23	CRT; 1; 19	CRT; 2; 23	CRT; 3; 9	ARA; 1	ARA; 2	ARA; 3	CAT; 1	CAT; 2	CAT; 3	28th	2

=== Complete Italian F4 Championship results ===
(key) (Races in bold indicate pole position; races in italics indicate fastest lap)

Year	Team	1	2	3	4	5	6	7	8	9	10	11	12	13	14	15	16	17	18	19	20	21	22	23	24	25	DC	Points
2024	AKM Motorsport	MIS; 1; 19	MIS; 2; 19	MIS; 3; 26	IMO; 1; 10	IMO; 2; 10	IMO; 3; 11	VLL; 1; 10	VLL; 2; 21	VLL; 3 Ret	MUG; 1 Ret	MUG; 2; 27	MUG; 3; 12	LEC; 1; 16	LEC; 2; 12	LEC; 3; 6	CAT; 1 Ret	CAT; 2; 11	CAT; 3; 11	MNZ; 1; 17	MNZ; 2; 29	MNZ; 3; 33†					17th	11
2025	R-ace GP	MIS1; 1	MIS1; 2; 3	MIS1; 3; 3	MIS1; 4; 4	VLL; 1	VLL; 2; 5	VLL; 3; 20	VLL; 4; 2	MNZ; 1; 9	MNZ; 2; 34†	MNZ; 3; 5	MUG; 1; 4	MUG; 2; 11	MUG; 3; 30	IMO; 1; 8	IMO; 2 C	IMO; 3; 21	CAT; 1; 3	**CAT**; **2**; 5	**CAT**; **3** C	MIS2; 1	MIS2; 2; 7	MIS2; 3; 22	MIS2; 4; 10	MIS2; 5; 5	7th	140

* Season still in progress.

=== Complete Euro 4 Championship results ===
(key) (Races in bold indicate pole position; races in italics indicate fastest lap)

Year	Team	1	2	3	4	5	6	7	8	9	DC	Points
2024	AKM Motorsport	MUG; 1; 13	MUG; 2; 25†	MUG; 3; 14	RBR; 1	RBR; 2	RBR; 3	MNZ; 1; 21	MNZ; 2; 17	MNZ; 3; 9	23rd	2

=== Complete F4 Middle East Championship results ===
(key) (Races in bold indicate pole position; races in italics indicate fastest lap)

Year	Team	1	2	3	4	5	6	7	8	9	10	11	12	13	14	15	DC	Points
2025	R-ace GP	**YMC1**; **1**; 1	YMC1; 2; 3	YMC1; 3; 1	**YMC2**; **1**; 1	YMC2; 2; 4	**YMC2**; **3**; 1	**DUB**; **1**; 1	DUB; 2; 2	DUB; 3; 3	**YMC3**; **1**; 3	YMC3; 2 Ret	YMC3; 3; 3	LUS; 1; 1	LUS; 2; 3	LUS; 3; 2	1st	339

=== Complete FIA F4 World Cup results ===
Year	Car	Qualifying	Quali Race	Main Race
2025	Mygale M21-F4	**3rd**	**1st**	**2nd**

=== Complete Formula Regional Middle East Trophy results ===
(key) (Races in bold indicate pole position) (Races in italics indicate fastest lap)

Year	Entrant	1	2	3	4	5	6	7	8	9	10	11	12	DC	Points
2026	R-ace GP	YMC1; 1	YMC1; 2	YMC1; 3	YMC2; 1	YMC2; 2	YMC2; 3	DUB; 1; 7	DUB; 2 Ret	DUB; 3; 3	LUS; 1; 7	LUS; 2 C	LUS; 3; 8	14th	31

=== Complete Formula Regional European Championship results ===
(key) (Races in bold indicate pole position) (Races in italics indicate fastest lap)

Year	Team	1	2	3	4	5	6	7	8	9	10	11	12	13	14	15	16	17	18	19	20	DC	Points
2026	R-ace GP	RBR; 1; 22	RBR; 2; 7	RBR; 3 Ret	ZAN; 1; 3	ZAN; 2; 6	SPA; 1; 6	SPA; 2 C	SPA; 3; 8	MNZ; 1; 2	MNZ; 2 Ret	**MNZ**; **3**; 1	HUN; 1; 4	HUN; 2; 2	LEC; 1; 2	LEC; 2; 2	**IMO**; **1**; 1	IMO; 2; 9	IMO; 3; 2	HOC; 1 Ret	HOC; 2; 2	1st	218

=== Complete Macau Grand Prix results ===
Year	Team	Car	Qualifying	Quali Race	Main Race
2026	(France) R-ace GP	Tatuus T-326	TBD	TBD	TBD

== Notes ==
Sporting positions
Preceded by Inaugural	F4 Middle East Championship; Champion; 2025	Succeeded by Oleksandr Bondarev (UAE4 Series)
Preceded by Freddie Slater	Formula Regional European Championship; Champion; 2026	Succeeded by Incumbent
