= 2024 Formula 4 CEZ Championship =

Formula 4 CEZ Championship season

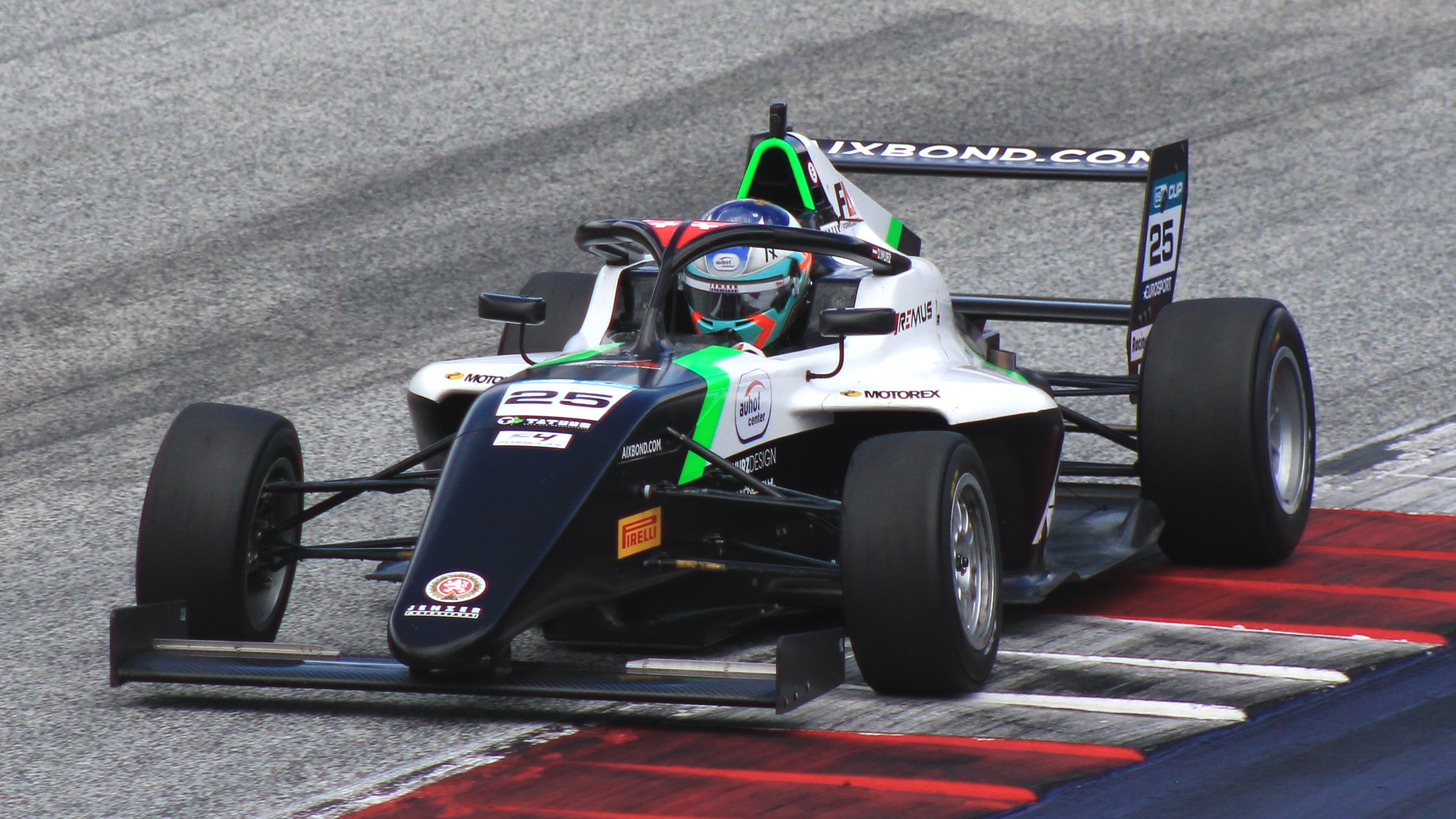
Oscar Wurz became the 2024 Formula 4 CEZ Champion.

The 2024 Formula 4 CEZ Championship was the second season of the Formula 4 CEZ Championship, a motor racing series for the Central Europe regulated according to FIA Formula 4 regulations, and organised and promoted by the Automobile Club of the Czech Republic (ACCR), Krenek Motorsport and HM Sports.

The season commenced on 27 April at Balaton Park Circuit in Hungary and concluded on 22 September at Salzburgring in Austria.

== Teams and drivers ==
Team	No.	Driver	Class	Rounds
(Germany) PHM AIX Racing	3	(Italy) Maksimilian Popov (Note: Kutskov is Russian, but competes as a neutral athlete as Russian national emblems were banned by the FIA following the Russian invasion of Ukraine. For the same reason Popov competes under an Italian license.)		2
(Germany) PHM AIX Racing	10	(United States) Everett Stack		2
(Germany) PHM AIX Racing	16	(Italy) Davide Larini		2
(Germany) PHM AIX Racing	49	(Serbia) Andrej Petrović		2
(Germany) PHM AIX Racing	70	(Australia) Kamal Mrad		2
(Czech Republic) JMT Racing	6	(Czech Republic) Miroslav Mikeš		All
(Austria) Renauer Motorsport	9	(Romania) Luca Savu		1–2
(Austria) Renauer Motorsport	9	(Austria) Simon Schranz		5–6
(Romania) Real Racing	11	(Romania) Luca Viișoreanu		2
(Hungary) Ideal Line & Performance / Gender Racing Team	14	(France) Jean-Paul Karras		4–6
(Hungary) Ideal Line & Performance / Gender Racing Team	74	(France) Jonathan Correrella		1–3
(Hungary) Ideal Line & Performance / Gender Racing Team	100	(France) Phillipe Armand Karras		4–6
(Italy) BVM Racing	17	(China) Simon Zhang		2
(Italy) BVM Racing	18	(Czech Republic) Jan Koller		2
(Czech Republic) F4 CEZ Academy Club in AČR	17	(Czech Republic) František Němec		5–6
(Czech Republic) F4 CEZ Academy Club in AČR	77	(Czech Republic) Marek Mičík		4–6
(Czech Republic) F4 CEZ Academy Club in AČR	123	(Czech Republic) Michelle Jandová		4
(Czech Republic) Orlen Janik Motorsport	19	(Poland) Franciszek Hałatnik		1–4
(Switzerland) Jenzer Motorsport	20	(Slovakia) Matúš Ryba		2
(Switzerland) Jenzer Motorsport	21	(Switzerland) Ethan Ischer	G	1–2
(Switzerland) Jenzer Motorsport	22	(Switzerland) Enea Frey		2
(Switzerland) Jenzer Motorsport	22	(Czech Republic) Teodor Borenstein		3–4, 6
(Switzerland) Jenzer Motorsport	24	(China) Simon Zhang		1
(Switzerland) Jenzer Motorsport	25	(Austria) Oscar Wurz		All
(Switzerland) Jenzer Motorsport	26	(Serbia) Andrija Kostić		1–2
(Switzerland) Jenzer Motorsport	144	(Czech Republic) Max Karhan		All
(Switzerland) Maffi Racing	31	(Kyrgyzstan) Kirill Kutskov		All
(Switzerland) Maffi Racing	45	(Venezuela) Gabriel Holguin		3
(Switzerland) Maffi Racing	119	(Poland) Kornelia Olkucka		All
(Switzerland) Maffi Racing	122	(Switzerland) Nathanaël Berreby		2, 5–6
(Slovenia) AS Motorsport	61	(Poland) Michalina Sabaj		All
(Slovenia) AS Motorsport	62	(Poland) Wiktor Dobrzański		2
(Slovenia) AS Motorsport	62	(Australia) Joanne Ciconte		5–6
(Czech Republic) SAPE Motorsport	77	(Czech Republic) Marek Mičík		1–3
(Czech Republic) SAPE Motorsport	123	(Czech Republic) Michelle Jandová		1–3

Icon	Legend
G	Guest drivers ineligible to score points

- Preston Lambert was announced to compete with Renauer Motorsport before switching to the F4 Spanish Championship.

== Race calendar and results ==
The provisional calendar featuring six rounds across five countries was published on 17 September 2023. All rounds, except for the Slovakia Ring one supporting the European Truck Racing Championship, were a part of the ESET Cup package. The revised version was released on 22 November 2023. The opening round at Motorsport Arena Oschersleben on 5–7 April was cancelled and replaced by Salzburgring on 21–22 September. Balaton Park Circuit was chosen as the venue of the Hungarian and became the new season opener. In January 2024, the round at Red Bull Ring was expanded to three races.

Rnd.		Circuit/Location	Date	Pole position	Fastest lap	Winning driver	Winning team
1	R1	(Hungary) Balaton Park Circuit, Balatonfőkajár	27 April	(Switzerland) Ethan Ischer	(China) Simon Zhang	(Switzerland) Ethan Ischer	(Switzerland) Jenzer Motorsport
1	R2	(Hungary) Balaton Park Circuit, Balatonfőkajár	28 April		(Switzerland) Ethan Ischer	(Switzerland) Ethan Ischer	(Switzerland) Jenzer Motorsport
1	R3	(Hungary) Balaton Park Circuit, Balatonfőkajár	28 April		(Austria) Oscar Wurz	Kirill Kutskov	(Switzerland) Maffi Racing
2	R1	(Austria) Red Bull Ring, Spielberg	18 May	(Australia) Kamal Mrad	(Serbia) Andrej Petrović	(Serbia) Andrej Petrović	(Germany) PHM AIX Racing
2	R2	(Austria) Red Bull Ring, Spielberg	19 May		(Serbia) Andrej Petrović	(Italy) Maksimilian Popov	(Germany) PHM AIX Racing
2	R3	(Austria) Red Bull Ring, Spielberg	19 May		(Australia) Kamal Mrad	(Australia) Kamal Mrad	(Germany) PHM AIX Racing
3	R1	Automotodróm Slovakia Ring, Orechová Potôň	8 June	(Austria) Oscar Wurz	(Austria) Oscar Wurz	(Austria) Oscar Wurz	(Switzerland) Jenzer Motorsport
3	R2	Automotodróm Slovakia Ring, Orechová Potôň	9 June		(Austria) Oscar Wurz	(Austria) Oscar Wurz	(Switzerland) Jenzer Motorsport
3	R3	Automotodróm Slovakia Ring, Orechová Potôň	9 June		(France) Jonathan Correrella	(Czech Republic) Max Karhan	(Switzerland) Jenzer Motorsport
4	R1	(Czech Republic) Autodrom Most, Most	3 August	(Czech Republic) Miroslav Mikeš	(Austria) Oscar Wurz	(Czech Republic) Miroslav Mikeš	(Czech Republic) JMT Racing
4	R2	(Czech Republic) Autodrom Most, Most	4 August		(Kyrgyzstan) Kirill Kutskov	(Kyrgyzstan) Kirill Kutskov	(Switzerland) Maffi Racing
4	R3	(Czech Republic) Autodrom Most, Most	4 August		(Czech Republic) Max Karhan	(Czech Republic) Max Karhan	(Switzerland) Jenzer Motorsport
5	R1	(Czech Republic) Brno Circuit, Brno	7 September	(Kyrgyzstan) Kirill Kutskov	(Kyrgyzstan) Kirill Kutskov	(Czech Republic) Max Karhan	(Switzerland) Jenzer Motorsport
5	R2	(Czech Republic) Brno Circuit, Brno	8 September		(Czech Republic) Max Karhan	(Czech Republic) Max Karhan	(Switzerland) Jenzer Motorsport
5	R3	(Czech Republic) Brno Circuit, Brno	8 September		(Kyrgyzstan) Kirill Kutskov	(Kyrgyzstan) Kirill Kutskov	(Switzerland) Maffi Racing
6	R1	(Austria) Salzburgring, Plainfeld	21 September	(Kyrgyzstan) Kirill Kutskov	(Austria) Oscar Wurz	(Kyrgyzstan) Kirill Kutskov	(Switzerland) Maffi Racing
6	R2	(Austria) Salzburgring, Plainfeld	22 September		(Austria) Oscar Wurz	(Kyrgyzstan) Kirill Kutskov	(Switzerland) Maffi Racing
6	R3	(Austria) Salzburgring, Plainfeld	22 September		(Czech Republic) Max Karhan	(Kyrgyzstan) Kirill Kutskov	(Switzerland) Maffi Racing

== Championship standings ==
Points were awarded to the top 10 classified finishers in each race. No points were awarded for pole position or fastest lap.

Position	**1st**	**2nd**	**3rd**	**4th**	**5th**	**6th**	**7th**	**8th**	**9th**	**10th**
Points	25	18	15	12	10	8	6	4	2	1

=== Drivers' standings ===
Pos	Driver	BAL (Hungary)			RBR (Austria)			SVK (Slovakia)			MOS (Czech Republic)			BRN (Czech Republic)			SAL (Austria)			Pts
Pos	Driver	R1	R2	R3	R1	R2	R3	R1	R2	R3	R1	R2	R3	R1	R2	R3	R1	R2	R3	Pts
1	(Austria) Oscar Wurz	2	2	2	5	8	2	**1**	1	2	3	8†	3	5	2	2	2	2	3	301
2	(Kyrgyzstan) Kirill Kutskov	4	3	1	Ret	23†	Ret	2	3	4	4	1	2	**2**	Ret	1	**1**	1	1	276
3	(Czech Republic) Max Karhan	7	4	10	Ret	13	12	4	4	1	2	3	1	1	1	4	3	3	2	242
4	(Czech Republic) Miroslav Mikeš	5	5	6	12	10	16	7	2	6	**1**	2	5	3	5	3	WD	WD	WD	161
5	(Poland) Michalina Sabaj	12	8	Ret	20	20	DSQ	5	Ret	5	6	Ret	6	8	7	7	6	4	7	84
6	(France) Jonathan Correrella	8	12	4	9	11	Ret	3	5	3										66
7	(Switzerland) Nathanaël Berreby				18	Ret	18							7	3	6	5	6	5	57
8	(Austria) Simon Schranz													6	4	11	4	5	4	54
9	(Italy) Davide Larini				2	2	3													51
10	(Australia) Kamal Mrad				**7**	3	1													46
11	(Italy) Maksimilian Popov				3	1	7													46
12	(Serbia) Andrej Petrović				1	6	6													43
13	(China) Simon Zhang	3	Ret	5	11	7	9													41
14	(Czech Republic) Marek Mičík	9	7	9	16	15	15	WD	WD	WD	10†	5	7	10	10	8	WD	WD	WD	39
15	(Switzerland) Enea Frey				4	5	4													36
16	(France) Phillipe Armand Karras										5	4	4	WD	WD	WD	WD	WD	WD	34
17	(Poland) Kornelia Olkucka	14	11	Ret	21	19	19	Ret	7	8	9	7	9	9	6	9	WD	WD	WD	33
18	(Australia) Joanne Ciconte													4	8	5	WD	WD	WD	26
19	(Serbia) Andrija Kostić	6	9	8	14	12	8													24
20	(Czech Republic) František Němec													11	9	10	7	7	6	23
21	(Romania) Luca Viișoreanu				6	9	5													22
22	(Poland) Franciszek Hałatnik	13	10	11	22	18	17	6	8	7	WD	WD	WD							21
23	(Romania) Luca Savu	11	6	7	13	17	Ret													19
24	(Czech Republic) Michelle Jandová	10	Ret	12†	WD	WD	WD	8	Ret	9†	8	Ret	8							16
25	(France) Jean-Paul Karras										7	6	DNS	WD	WD	WD	WD	WD	WD	14
26	(Czech Republic) Teodor Borenstein							10†	6	Ret	WD	WD	WD				DNS	DNS	DNS	9
27	(Slovakia) Matúš Ryba				10	14	10													3
28	(Venezuela) Gabriel Holguin							9†	Ret	Ret										2
29	(Czech Republic) Jan Koller				15	21†	11													0
30	(United States) Everett Stack				17	16	13													0
31	(Poland) Wiktor Dobrzański				19	22†	14													0
Guest drivers ineligible to score points
–	(Switzerland) Ethan Ischer	**1**	1	3	8	4	Ret													–
Pos	Driver	R1	R2	R3	R1	R2	R3	R1	R2	R3	R1	R2	R3	R1	R2	R3	R1	R2	R3	Pts
Pos	Driver	BAL (Hungary)			RBR (Austria)			SVK (Slovakia)			MOS (Czech Republic)			BRN (Czech Republic)			SAL (Austria)			Pts

Colour	Result
Gold	Winner
Silver	Second place
Bronze	Third place
Green	Points classification
Blue	Non-points classification
Blue	Non-classified finish (NC)
Purple	Retired, not classified (Ret)
Red	Did not qualify (DNQ)
Red	Did not pre-qualify (DNPQ)
Black	Disqualified (DSQ)
White	Did not start (DNS)
White	Withdrew (WD)
White	Race cancelled (C)
Blank	Did not practice (DNP)
Blank	Did not arrive (DNA)
Blank	Excluded (EX)

**Bold** – Pole
Italics – Fastest Lap

- † – Driver did not finish the race, but was classified as they completed over 75% of the race distance.

=== Teams' standings ===
Pos	Team	BAL (Hungary)			RBR (Austria)			SVK (Slovakia)			MOS (Czech Republic)			BRN (Czech Republic)			SAL (Austria)			Pts
Pos	Team	R1	R2	R3	R1	R2	R3	R1	R2	R3	R1	R2	R3	R1	R2	R3	R1	R2	R3	Pts
1	(Switzerland) Jenzer Motorsport	2	2	2	4	5	2	1	1	1	2	3	1	1	1	2	2	2	2	599
1	(Switzerland) Jenzer Motorsport	3	4	5	5	8	4	4	4	2	3	8	3	5	2	4	3	3	3	599
2	(Switzerland) Maffi Racing	4	3	1	18	19	18	2	3	4	4	1	2	2	3	1	1	1	1	364
2	(Switzerland) Maffi Racing	14	11	Ret	21	23†	19	9†	7	8	9	7	9	7	6	6	5	6	5	364
3	(Czech Republic) JMT Racing	5	5	6	12	10	16	7	2	6	1	2	5	3	5	3	WD	WD	WD	161
4	(Germany) PHM AIX Racing				1	1	1													126
4	(Germany) PHM AIX Racing				2	2	3													126
5	(Hungary) Ideal Line & Performance / Gender Racing Team	8	12	4	9	11	Ret	3	5	3	5	4	4	WD	WD	WD	WD	WD	WD	114
5	(Hungary) Ideal Line & Performance / Gender Racing Team										7	6	DNS	WD	WD	WD	WD	WD	WD	114
6	(Slovenia) AS Motorsport	12	8	Ret	19	20	14	5	Ret	5	6	Ret	6	4	7	5	6	4	7	110
6	(Slovenia) AS Motorsport				20	22†	DSQ							8	8	7	WD	WD	WD	110
7	(Austria) Renauer Motorsport	11	6	7	13	17	Ret							6	4	11	4	5	4	73
8	(Czech Republic) F4 CEZ Academy Club in AČR										8	5	7	10	9	8	7	7	6	54
8	(Czech Republic) F4 CEZ Academy Club in AČR										10	Ret	8	11	10	10	WD	WD	WD	54
9	(Czech Republic) SAPE Motorsport	9	7	9	16	15	15	8	Ret	9†										24
9	(Czech Republic) SAPE Motorsport	10	Ret	12†	WD	WD	WD	WD	WD	WD										24
10	(Romania) Real Racing				6	9	5													22
11	(Czech Republic) Orlen Janik Motorsport	13	10	11	22	18	17	6	8	7	WD	WD	WD							21
12	(Italy) BVM Racing				11	7	9													11
12	(Italy) BVM Racing				15	21†	11													11
Pos	Team	R1	R2	R3	R1	R2	R3	R1	R2	R3	R1	R2	R3	R1	R2	R3	R1	R2	R3	Pts
Pos	Team	BAL (Hungary)			RBR (Austria)			SVK (Slovakia)			MOS (Czech Republic)			BRN (Czech Republic)			SAL (Austria)			Pts
